= Shia Islam in South Asia =

Regions with significant populations
- India; Ladakh (Kargil, Nubra), Jammu and Kashmir (Budgam), Gujarat, Uttar Pradesh (Lucknow), Rajasthan (Ajmer), Karnataka (Alipur, Bangalore, Thyamagondlu, Gauribidanur, Sulibele, Mysore, Holenarasipura), Maharashtra
- Pakistan: 35–45 million
- India: 30–40 million
- Bangladesh: 60,000

Shia Islam was brought to South Asia during the final years of the Rashidun Caliphate. South Asia also served as a refuge for some Shias escaping persecution from Umayyads, Abbasids, Ayyubids, and Ottomans. The immigration continued throughout the second millennium until the formation of modern nation-states. Shi'ism also won converts among the local population.

Shia Islam has a long history and deep roots in South Asia. However, the earliest major political influence was that of the Shia dynasties in Deccan. It was here that the indigenous and distinct Shia culture took shape. After the conquest of Golconda by Mughal emperor Aurangzeb in the 17th century and subsequent establishment of hereditary governorship in Awadh after his death, Lucknow became the nerve center of Indian Shi'ism.

In the 18th century, intellectual movements of Islamic puritanism were launched by Muhammad ibn Abd al-Wahhab in Najd and Shah Waliullah and his sons, with Shah Abdul Aziz being the main flag-bearer of modern anti-Shi'ism in Delhi. These movements coincided with the beginning of the British conquest of India and the downfall of Shia dynasties in Bengal and Awadh. These factors caused the onset of continuous persecution of the Shia community and laid the foundations of organised violence against them that has become a part of Shia life in the Indian subcontinent, especially Pakistan.

== Demography ==
Shias in South Asia are a minority that is geographically scattered in the majority population. Multicultural Indian Subcontinent did not force Shias into ghettos, in contrast to the Shias of the Middle East, who enjoy a local majority in their homelands because they were compelled to ghettoize in the medieval period because of persecution, now due to this demographic resource, they have become important political players in modern times.

Pakistan is said to have a Shia population of at least 25-50 million, like India. In 2006, Vali Nasr assessed the Shia population to be as high as 30-40 million. Pew research center estimates it to be 15% and for India it is 15% percent of the total Muslim population while for Bangladesh it was estimated to be less than 1% to 2% of the total population. Andreas Rieck in his detailed study of the Shias of Pakistan, estimates their numbers between 20 and 40 million, and around 15% of the total population of Pakistan.

Estimated Percentage of Shias Among the Muslims of Subcontinent according to Pew Research Center
Country	Percentage	Country	Percentage
India	15% of Muslim minority in whole Country	Nepal	< 1%
Pakistan	15%	Bangladesh	<2%
Afghanistan	10%	Sri Lanka	<1%
Bhutan	< 1%	Maldives	< 1%

=== Pre-Partition census ===
In British India, Shias and Sunnis were counted separately in the 1881, 1911 and 1921 censuses. The results were not reflective of reality as most Shias hide their religious beliefs from the state, because Shias feared the data might leak to the anti-Shia bigots and used to target them. For example, in 1881 Census of Jhang District, only 11, 835 people among the 326, 919 Muslims identified themselves as Shias. In 1921, in the census for Bihar and Orissa, 3711 Shias were counted separately, but the outcome was clearly absurd because an estimate made at the time placed the numbers at 17,000, i.e. five times the census enumeration. In the report of the Superintendent of Census Operations in the Province we read that:

"It is certain that these figures are not nearly complete, and the reason is that many Shias refused to record themselves as such".

For Patna, the outcome was ten times less than the estimate. It was for this reason that in the 1931 and 1941, it was decided not to count Muslims as Shias and Sunnis separately.

== History ==
=== Rashidun Caliphate (632–661) ===
Rashidun Caliphate (632–661)

The connection between the Indus Valley and Shia Islam was established by the initial Muslim missions. According to Derryl N. Maclean, a link between Sindh and Shias or proto-Shias can be traced to Hakim ibn Jabalah al-Abdi, who traveled across Sind to Makran in the year 649 and presented a report on the area to the Caliph. He supported Ali, and died fighting on his behalf alongside Sindhi Jats.

During the reign of Ali, many Jats came under the influence of Shi'ism. Harith ibn Murrah Al-abdi and Sayfi ibn Fil' al-Shaybani, both officers of Ali's army, attacked bandits and chased them to Al-Qiqan (present-day Quetta) in the year 658.

=== Umayyad period (661–750) ===
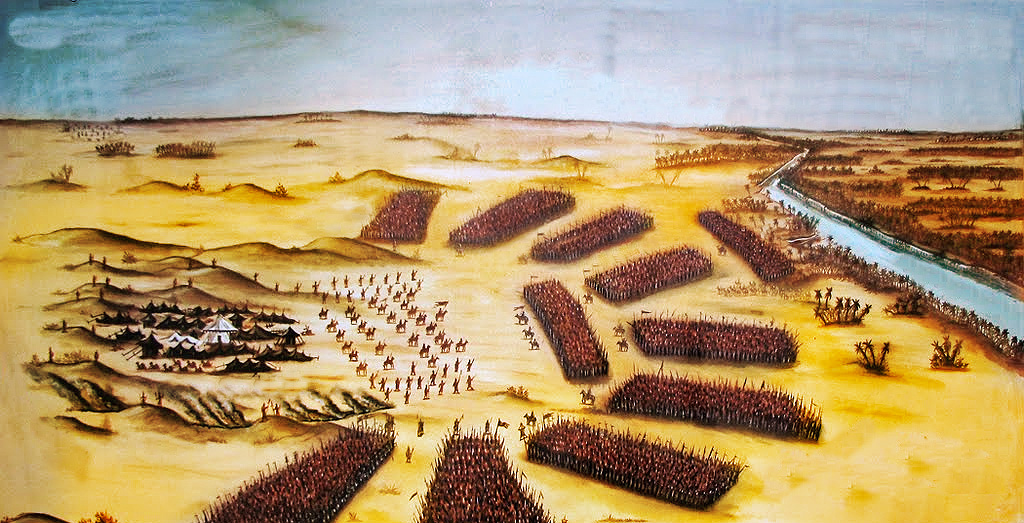
Battle of Karbala

Under the Umayyads, partisans of Ali were persecuted. Sayfi, a commander of Ali's army which had fought against bandits in present-day Balouchistan, was one of the seven Shias who were beheaded alongside Hujr ibn Adi al-Kindi in 660AD, near Damascus. Many Shias sought asylum in the region of Sindh, perhaps to live in relative peace among the Shia Jats. Ziyad Hindi is one of those refugees. The second wife of the fourth Shia Imam, Ali ibn Hussain, Jayda al-Sindi, was from Sindh. She is the mother of Zayd ibn Ali. Sindh was conquered and added to the Umayyad dynasty by Muhammad ibn Qasim in 711 AD. Persecution of Shias in the Umayyad dynasty reached its peak in the times of Al-Walid ibn Abd al-Malik, especially at the hands of Hajjaj ibn Yusuf. While Muhammad ibn Qasim was governor of Shiraz, a disciple of the companion of Prophet Jabir ibn Abd Allah al-Ansari and famous narrator of Hadith, a supporter of revolt of Ibn al-Ashʿath and a Shia notable of the time, Atiyah ibn Sa'd was arrested by him on the orders of Al-Hajjaj and commanded to curse Ali or be punished. Atiyah refused and was flogged by 400 lashes and his head and beard shaved for humiliation. He fled to Khurasan. Muhammad ibn Qasim had moved on to invade Sindh after this incident, and history is silent about how he treated the Shias of Sindh.

=== Abbasid period (750–1258) ===
After the brief Umayyad rule in Sind had come to an end, history counts ten among the seventy notable Muslims of the eighth and ninth centuries bearing a Sindhi family name (14.3% of all individuals) to be Shi'ites. In the initial excavation of the urban complex of Brahmanabad-Mansurah-Mahfuzah, A. P. Bellasis uncovered a seal bearing the Arabic inscription "Imam al-Baqir" which appear to belong to the fifth Shi'ite Imam Muhammad al-Baqir (677–733). Some students of Imam Jafar Al Sadiq had Indian family names, e.g., Aban Sindi, Khalid Sindi and Faraj Sindi.

==== Abdullah Shah Ghazi ====
The first major Shi'ite missionary wave that touched the shores of Sindh was the movement led by Muhammad al-Nafs al-Zakiyah ibn Abdullah ibn Hasan ibn Hasan ibn Ali, his son Abdullah al-Ashtar and his brother Ibrahim. Around the year 761, they came by sea from Aden to Sind to visit a partisan, Umar ibn Hafs Hazarmard. The next year, Ibrahim went to Kufah and Nafs al-Zakiyah to Medina and started planning the revolt. Abdullah al-Ashtar, also known as Abdullah Shah Ghazi, stayed in Sindh, married a local Muslim woman and had children by her. Ibn Khaldun and Ibn al-Athir say that the governor had Shi'ite inclinations. Abdullah al-Ashtar had around 400 troops of the Shi'ite Zaydiyah branch, who at the time were active supporters of Ahlulbayt, ready for armed struggle. However, the governor received word from his wife in Basrah that Nafs Al-Zakiyah had been killed in Medina (14 Ramadan 145/6 December 762). Confused and undecided, he told Abdullah Ashtar that:

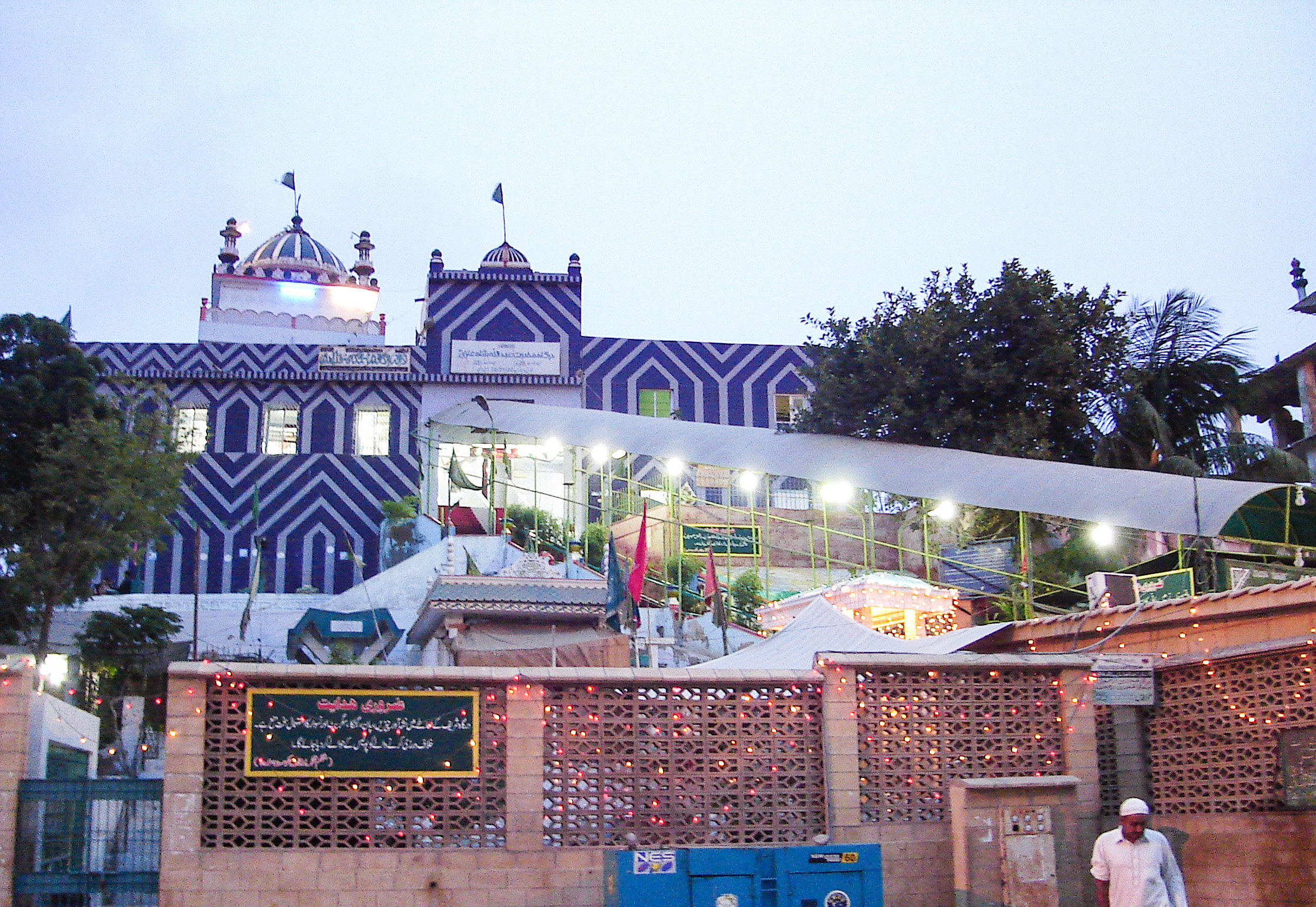
The tomb of Abdullah Shah Ghazi in Karachi

"I know an influential Hindu king in a district of Sindh who has a strong army. Despite his polytheism, he greatly honors [the family of] the Prophet. He is a trustworthy person. I will write to him and try to arrange an agreement between you and him. You will know that this is the best place for you and your followers. "

The Hindu king agreed to offer asylum. Abdullah al-Ashtar spent some years there, probably from 763 to 770. Eventually, the news of his safe escape reached the caliph al-Mansur who deposed Umar ibn Hafs and appointed Hisham ibn Amr al-Taghlibi on the understanding that he will arrest Abdullah al-Ashtar, kill or disperse the Zaydiyah troops, and annexe the Hindu dynasty. When Hisham also hesitated to carry out the massacre, his brother Sufayh did it in his place, killing Abdullah along with many of his companions.

==== The Buyids and the Fatimids ====
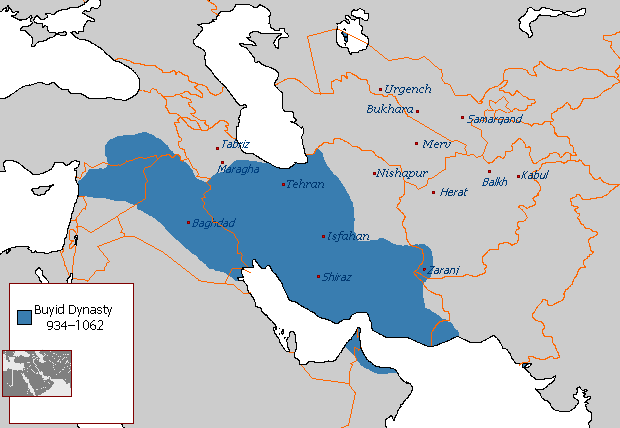
Buyid Dynasty (934–1055

In the Abbasid Caliphate, various Shiite groups organised secret opposition to their rule. In the tenth and eleventh centuries, the Twelver Shias of the Buyid Dynasty (934–1055) managed to establish their rule over much of Iran and Iraq without removing the Abbasid Caliph from his throne. Parallel to it was the Ismaili Shia Fatimid Caliphate (909–1171) in Egypt and North Africa. This was the golden age of Islam as scientists like Ibn Sina (980–1037), ibn al -Haytham (965–1040), Al-Biruni (973–1050) and hundreds of others enjoyed the intellectual freedom and contributed to philosophy, medicine, physics and other disciplines of science. When the historian and geographer al-Masudi arrived in Sindh in 915, he met a number of Shias there. They were descendants of Umar ibn Ali ibn Abi Talib and Muhammad ibn Ali ibn Abi Talib, al-Hanafiyah. The poet Abu Dulaf Misar ibn Muhalhil al-Yanbui, who came to India around 942, noted that the 'ruler of Multan was a descendant of Umar ibn Ali ibn Abi Talib (عمر الاطراف). Perhaps the Shi'ites were quasi-independent in a sector of the province of Multan. During the mid-11th century, the Buyids gradually fell to the Ghaznavid and Seljuq invasions, and with it started the decline of the Islamic Golden Age. In 1091, the famous Sunni theologian, Imam Al-Ghazali, declared that Philosophers like Ibn Sina were heretics. His book Tahāfut al-Falāsifa proved to be the final blow to science education in the Islamic world.

Around 958, a Fatimid missionary converted a local Hindu ruler, and an Ismaili state was established in Sind, with its capital in Multan. They converted locals to Ismailism en masse, while the khutba was read in the name of the Fatimid Caliph. It was during this period that the earliest public mourning of Muharram and the Shia call to prayer (Azan) was introduced to the Indus valley (present-day Pakistan).

==== The Ghaznavids and the Ghurids ====
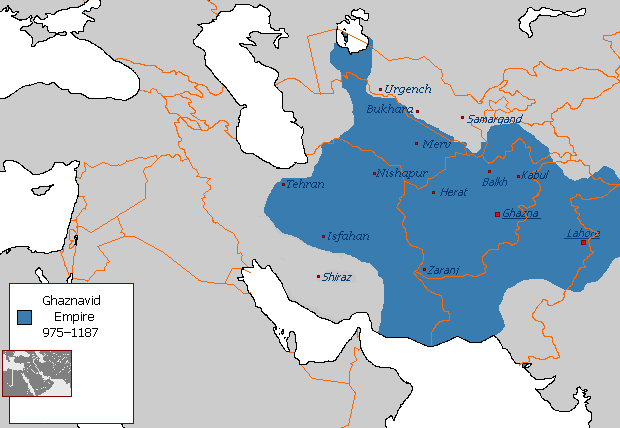
Ghaznavid Empire 975–1187

In 1005, Sultan Mahmud of Ghazna invaded Multan. The Shi'a mosque was destroyed and reduced to a barn-floor. Five years later, he attacked again and annexed the territory completely. Ismailism managed to survive in Sind and enjoyed the protection of the Soomras, a dynasty based in Thatta for almost three centuries starting in 1051. Small pockets of Ismaili community also thrived in Uchh, Aror, Mansura and Bhakkar.

The Ghaznavid Empire was overthrown in 1186 when Sultan Mu'izz ad-Din Muhammad of Ghor conquered the last Ghaznavid capital of Lahore. He was a great military leader and unlike Ghaznavids, he founded an empire in India, the Delhi Sultanate. Sultan Muhammad Ghuri lead many military campaigns in north India. On his way to Ghazni from India in 1206, he was killed. Some sources claim that he was assassinated at the hands of a devotee of the so-called "malahida" (a derogatory term used for Ismailis in medieval history), others claim that it was Khokhars who killed him.

=== Delhi Sultanate (1206–1526) ===
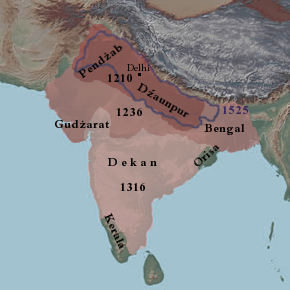
Delhi sultanate (1206–1526)

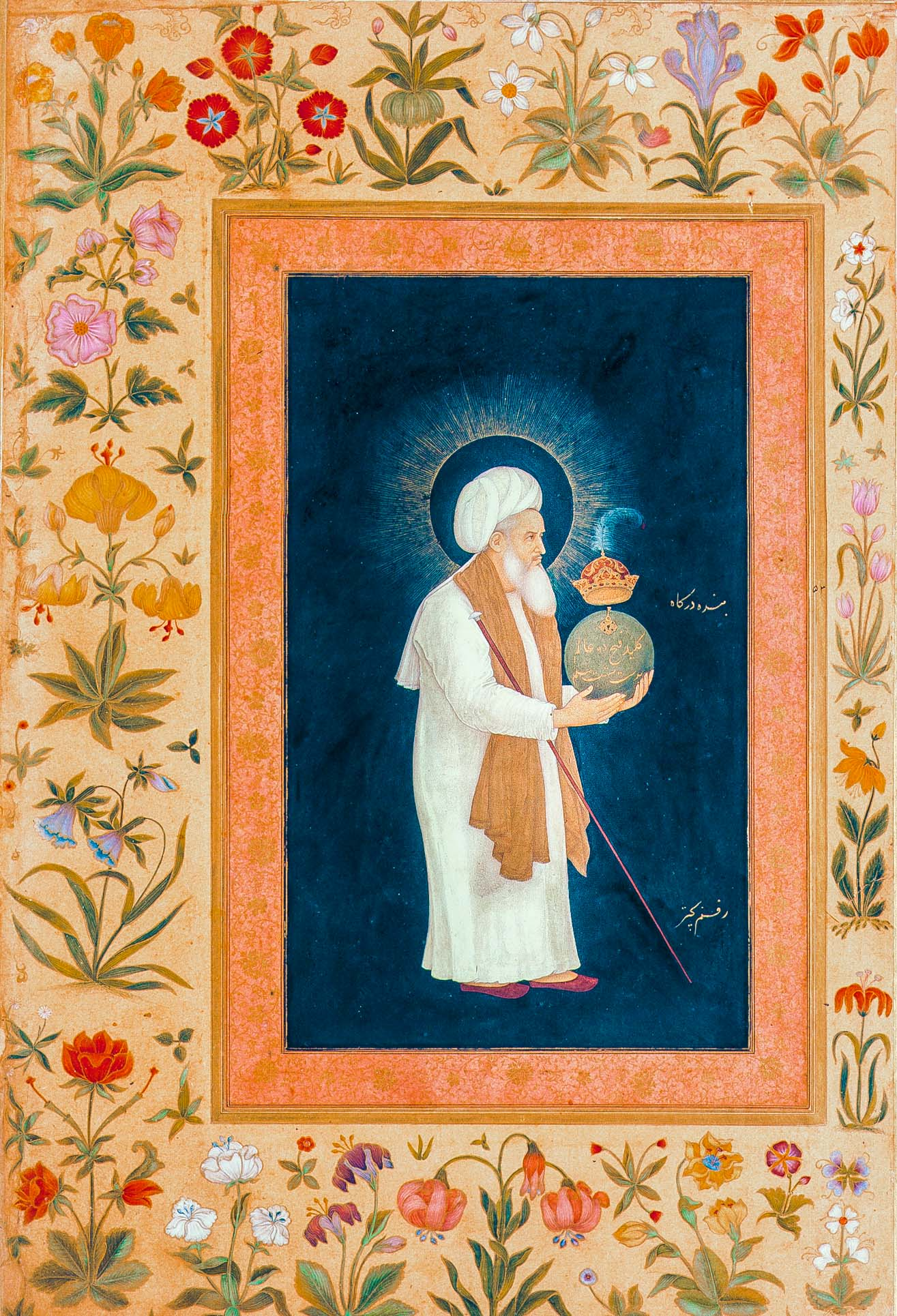
Muinuddin Chishti (image c. 1615)

The predecessors of the Delhi Sultanate were the Ghurids. Sunni Islam was brought to this region following the conquest of the Ghurids. Pashtun tribes crossed the Hindu Kush mountains to present-day Pakistan (Khyber Pakhtunkhawa province) between the 13th and 16th centuries, and mixed with the locals. The Ghurid tribe had embraced Islam in the times of Ali ibn Abu Talib. The Arab conquest of Persia, that began in 643, reached Khurasan region in 653 where local Pushtun tribes offered fierce resistance. The leader of the tribes, Mahawi Suri from the Shansabanian family along with a group of Ghurid chieftains visited the Caliph in Kufa. Upon meeting Ali in 657, they converted to Islam and Mahawi Suri was appointed governor of the region. The most of today's Afghanistan became part of the Muslim world in the reign of Umar ibn Abd al-Aziz. Ghur in Khurasan was the only part of Muslim world that had defied the Umayyad tradition of cursing Ali. The family of the first Rashidun Caliph Abu Bakr had resisted the Umayyad rule. His daughter Aisha, his sons Muhammad ibn Abu Bakr and Abdur Rahman ibn Abu Bakr, his grandson Abdullah ibn Zubayr and the son of his nephew, Abdur Rahman ibn Muhammad al-Ash'ath are the prominent Sunni opponents of the Umayyad rule. The Sunnis of Khurasan were as opposed to the Umayyad rule as the Shias were. They had been instrumental in overthrow of the Umayyad dynasty and in Abbasid rule under the Shia commander Abu Muslim al-Khurasani. The influential Muslim theologian, Imam Abu Hanifa (699 – 767) was born to an Afghan family living in Kufa, he had great regard for the Ahlulbayt and supported the Shi'ite revolt led by Zayd ibn Ali. The Delhi empire carried this legacy of attachment with Ahlulbayt and the family of Caliph Abu Bakr. It was during the early years of the Delhi Sultanate that the great Sufi saint, Moinuddin Chishti (1142–1236) set his foot in India and converted many locals to Islam.

During the early years of the establishment of Delhi Sultanate, a number of Ismaili Shias had settled around Delhi. Ismaili faith was also introduced to Gujrat during these years. Ismaili missionaries spread across Gujrat and managed to establish the Nizari Ismaili Khoja community and the Mustali Bohras. Till the reign of Iltutmish, they remained politically inactive, preaching their ideology secretly. In contrast to Ismailis, history does not record the presence of mainstream Twelver Shi'ism in the first phase of Delhi sultanate. One reason could be Taqiya, because the Shias fleeing persecution in the Middle East settled in the subcontinent as local minorities cautious of threats to their survival. The other reason for this is that the love of Ahlulbayt and the commemoration of Muharram by the Sufi's helped the twelver Shias integrate well into the Sunni Muslim minority of India and not claim a separate political identity. For example, during the Gwalior campaign of Iltutmish, special sermons by the name of "tazkirs" were delivered in the military camps during the first ten days of Muharram. Ibn Battuta came across Syed families in Delhi that had originally migrated from Hijaz and Iraq in the reign of Muhammad bin Tughluq (1324 – 1351). They might have fled persecution carried out by Ibn Taymiyyah and the Mamluks. Twelver Shias seem to be enjoying freedom and equal-before-the-law status during this period. However, when Sultan Feroz Shah (1351–1388) assumed power, he persecuted them. His order inscribed on the Firozshah Kotla Mosque, reads that 'Shias had published tracts and books on their creed, and engaged in the preaching the faith'. He claimed that he had seized all such Shia missionaries, paraded them for humiliation, executed the prominent ones, while burning their books. This was a rare incident of its kind in the medieval India. In 1380, the Sufi saint, Syed Muhammad Ashraf Jahangir Simnani introduced the alam-i Abbas to the subcontinent, the black signature flag of the Muharram commemorations.

By the end of fourteenth century, the southern and eastern parts of Delhi sultanate proclaimed independence and two separate kingdoms emerged: Jaunpur Sultanate in the east and the Bahmani Sultanate in the southern part of India.

==== Shia rule in Makran ====
Contemporary to Delhi Sultanate, a small Shia kingdom had emerged in Makran, the Malik dynasty. At the end of the thirteenth century, Marco Polo seems to have noticed them, when he mentioned the country as follows:

"Kesmacoran (i. e. Kech Makran) is a kingdom having a king of its own and a peculiar language. Some of the people are idolaters, but the most part are Saracens".

In the time of one Malik Kuchko, the country is said to have numerous population, and high degree of civilisation. The decline of this dynasty was caused by an attack by the ruler of Kirman in 1613. Malik Mirza, the last ruler, was killed and this marks the end of the Malik dynasty.

==== Shi'ism in Kashmir ====
Tomb of Mir Shams-ud Din Iraqi

In 1381, after Timur invaded Iran, Mir Syed Ali Hamdani, an Iranian Sufi arrived in Kashmir with a large number of disciples and preached Islam. He instilled the love of Ahlul Bayt in the hearts of the new converts and wrote many books and tracts. Shi'ism was properly introduced by Mir Shams-ud Din Iraqi whose grandfather Syed Muhammad Noor Bakhsh belonged to the Sufi order of Mir Syed Ali Hamdani and had huge following base in Iran, Qandhar, Kabul and Kashmir. Mir Shams-ud Din arrived in Kashmir in 1481 and then returned to Iran. Twenty years later in 1501, he came to Kashmir again, along with 700 Shia Sufis, scholars and missionaries. In 1505, the King of the Shah Mir Dynasty converted to Shi'ism and so did the Chak clan of Kashmir. He traveled in the valleys of Himalayas and spread Shi'ism from Skardu to Tibet, converting thousands of Hindus and Buddhists to Shi'ism. In 1516, the Sunni Chak dynasty was established and forcible conversions of Hindus began. In 1532, Sultan Said Khan dispatched an army under the command of Mirza Haider Dughlat that attacked Kashmir from Kashgar. He hated Shias and therefore went on a killing spree. Soon he suffered a military defeat and fled to the Mughal King Humayun in Lahore. He returned in 1540, accompanied by Mughal troops, at the invitation of one of the two rival factions that continually fought for power in Kashmir. He put an end to the Chak rule. His reign was a reign of terror and Shias had no choice but to practice Taqiyya. In 1550, he killed Mir Danial, the son of Mir Shams-ud Din Iraqi. This sparked an all-out revolt and he was killed by the end of the same year. Chak dynasty was re-established and in 1586, it merged with the Mughal Empire. Mughals appointed talented officers and contributed greatly to the cultural and economic life of Kashmir. In the following four centuries, Sunni Ulema and militia of the area and abroad, led ten campaigns of terror against Shias known as "Taraaj-e Shia" in the years: 1548, 1585, 1635, 1686, 1719, 1741, 1762, 1801, 1830 and 1872; during which the Shia villages were plundered, people slaughtered, women raped, libraries burnt, corpses mutilated and their sacred sites destroyed.

==== Shi'ism in Gilgit Baltistan ====
In the 16th century, while Gilgit was ruled by a Buddhist King Sri Badat, it was invaded by Shamsher of Skardu where Shi'ism had already won converts. Sri Badat's treatment of people is said to be so harsh that when Shamsher invaded, the people rose to rebellion and he fled the country. Shamsher introduced Shi'ism to Gilgit. His successors were Malik Khan, Tratra Khan and Trakhan, respectively. During the rule of Trakhan, Gilgit was invaded by Taj Mughal of Badakhshan. Trakhan was forced to accept Sunnism, and pay a yearly tribute. Taj Mughal then attacked Hunza, seized the ruler, Girkis, and forced them to change their faith. Nagar was not invaded and the people there have retained their original Shia creed. Around 1659, Sang-i Ali, the ruler of Chitral attacked Gilgit and expelled its ruler, Mirza Khan, who went to Skardu and there he converted to Shia faith. He returned with a stronger force and conquered Gilgit.

=== Shi'ism in south India (1490–1687) ===
Ibn Battuta reports a settlement of Shi'as at Quilon in Kerala in the first decades of the fourteenth century, where they 'proclaimed their affiliation openly'. The Bahmani kingdom (1347–1526) in the Deccan, had its capital in Gulbarga and then Bidar (in Karnataka) ruled by a dynasty of Persian origin. It patronized men of scholarship and hence Shia missionaries and scholars arrived in Deccan. In the phase of decline, it split up into five smaller kingdoms, three of them ruled by Shias.

==== The Adil Shahi dynasty (1489–1686) ====
Yusuf Adil Shah of Turkic origin, the adopted son of a Shia scholar Mahmud Gawan, declared autonomy in Bijapur in 1489 after his father was executed by the drunk king, and proclaimed Shi'ism as the state religion in 1502. Bijapur became the first Twelver Shia state in India, with Ja'fari, Hanafi and Sha'fi schools of Islamic law, each applied to its followers. It was the first time in India that Shia Adhan was called on the state pulpits and names of the twelve Shia Imams be included in Khutba. However, he strictly banned the practice of tabarra. In 1579, the king Ibrahim II adopted Sunni sect, but the people were allowed to follow their own. The Adil Shahi dynasty stayed independent until 1686 when it was annexed to the Mughal Empire by Aurangzeb.

==== The Qutb Shahi dynasty (1512–1687) ====
The longest surviving Shia-ruled state in southern India was that of the Qutb Shahs. Its founder Sultan Quli Qutb Mulk was of Turkoman origins. He ordered the Khutba to be read in the names of the twelve Shia Imams. This kingdom was known for its wealth: it is the only one among the Deccan sultanates to have a currency of gold coins. It became the hub of Shia culture in India, later surpassed only by Lucknow. Muhammad Quli Qutb Shah (1565–1612) is the first Urdu poet to have compiled and published a divan and also the first to write a Marsiya in Urdu. A Shia scholar and scientist, Mir Muhammad Momin, came to Golconda in 1581, and was assigned the task of designing the new capital Hyderabad, which was built in 1591. The first Imambara in India, by the name of "Badshahi Ashurkhana" was built along with other monuments and buildings like Charminar, gardens of Ilahi Mahal, Jama Masjid, Colleges and Hospitals. In 1592, the oldest surviving flag ''Alam'' was erected at the Ashurkhana.

The kingdom was at the center of diamond production and trade, not Asia alone but worldwide. rich in agriculture as it was, it was also famous for its weapons industry, cloth, carpet, agriculture, diamond and gold mines. Its riches lured Mughal Empire into attack and Shia religious and intellectual culture lost state patronage after it was annexed by Aurangzeb in 1687.

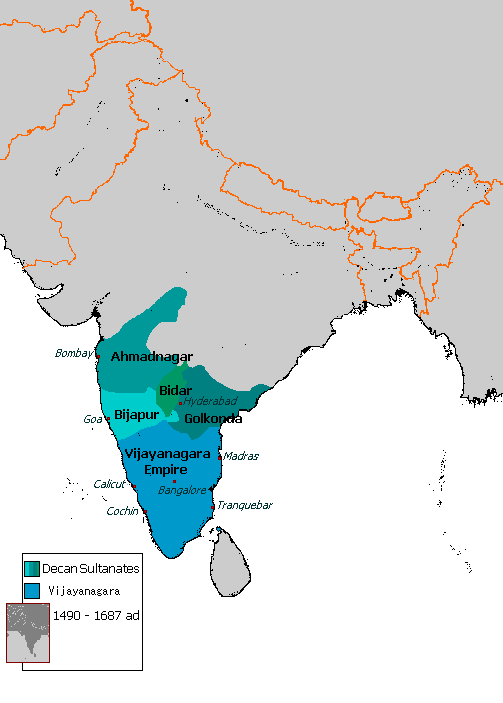
The Deccan sultanates (1490–1687)

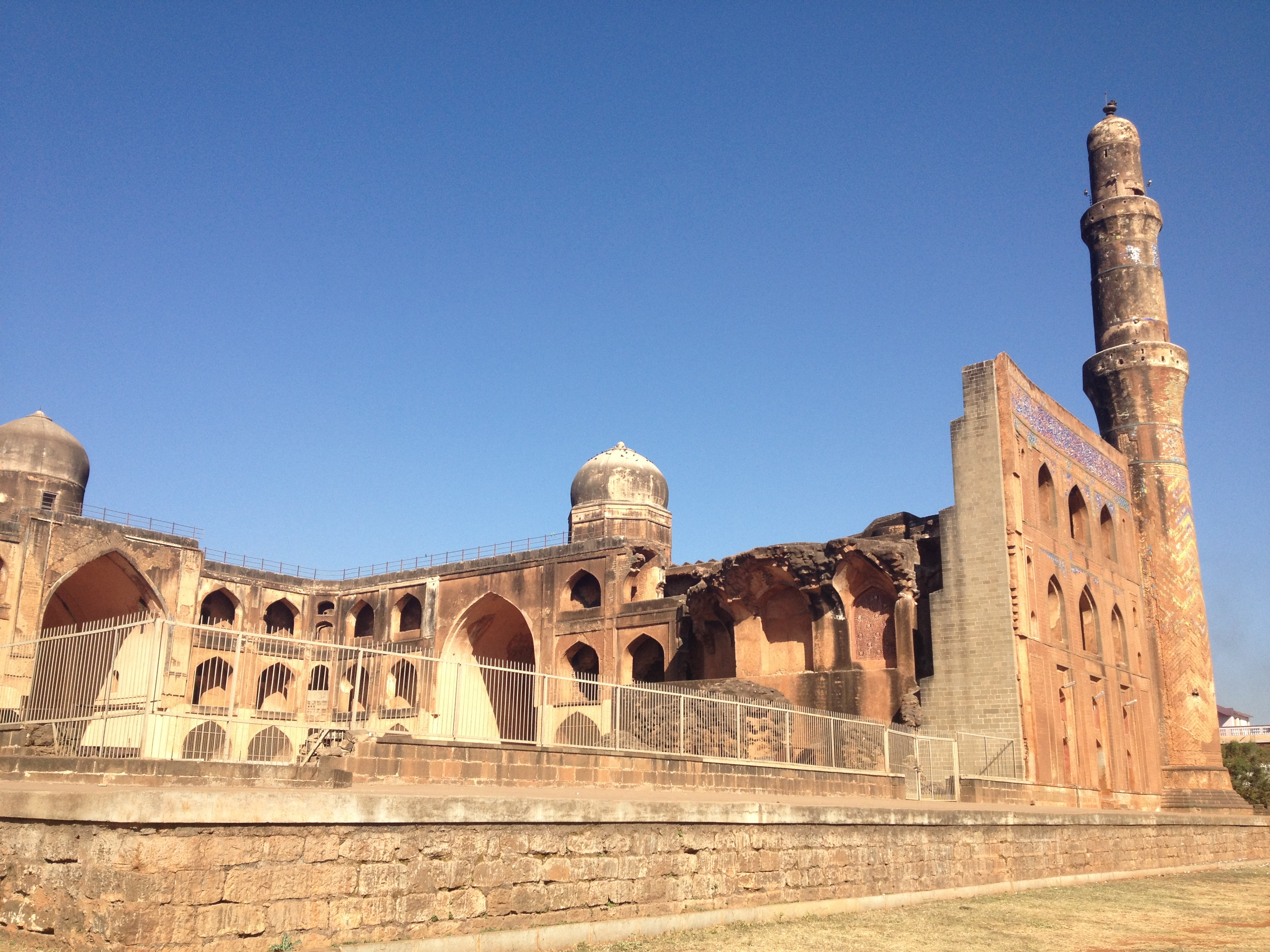
Mahmud Gawan Madrasa was built by Mahmud Gawan, the Shia scholar and Vizier, in 1460.

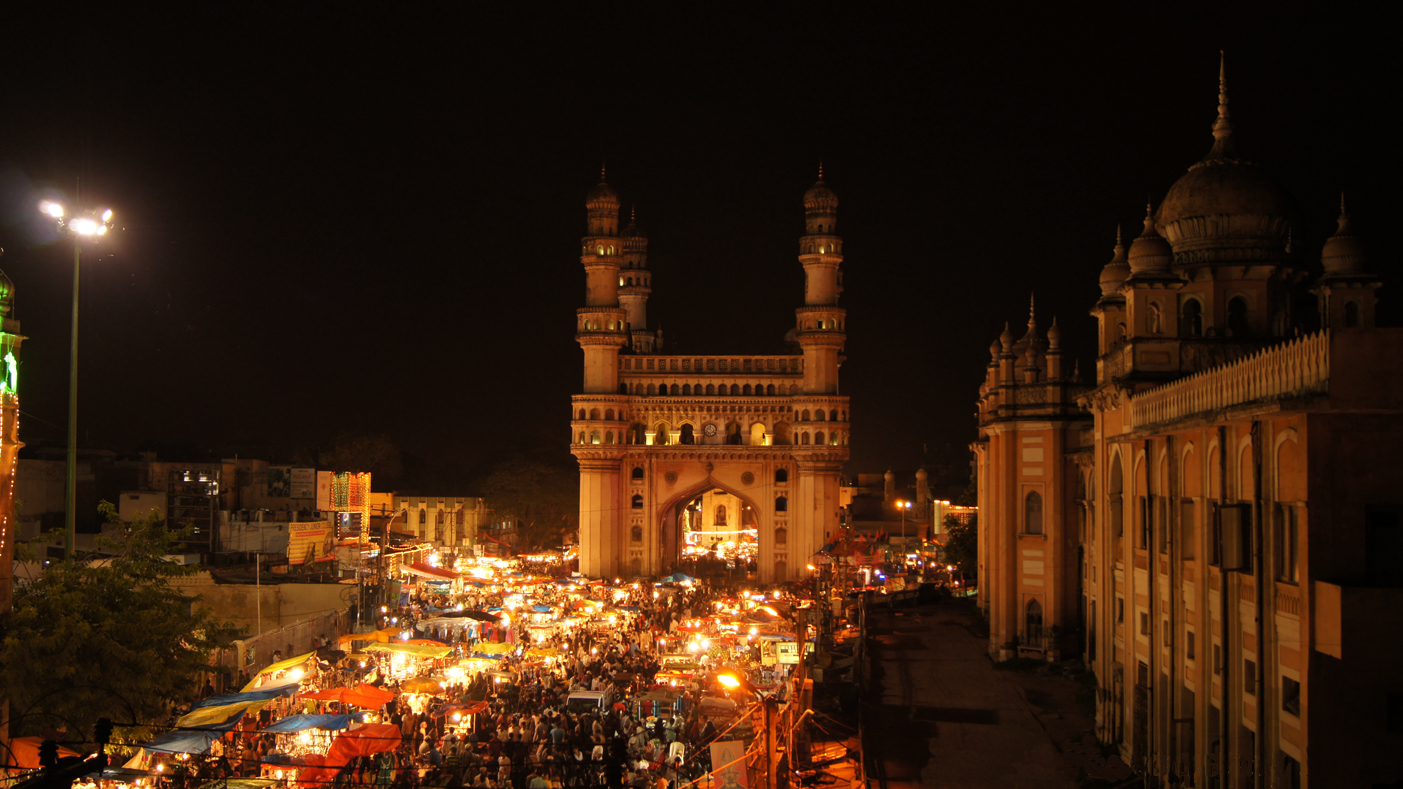
The Charminar designed in 1591 by the Shia scholar Mir Muhammad Momin, is located in Hyderabad, India.

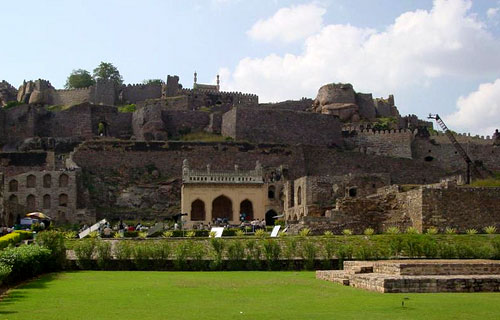
Golconda Fort

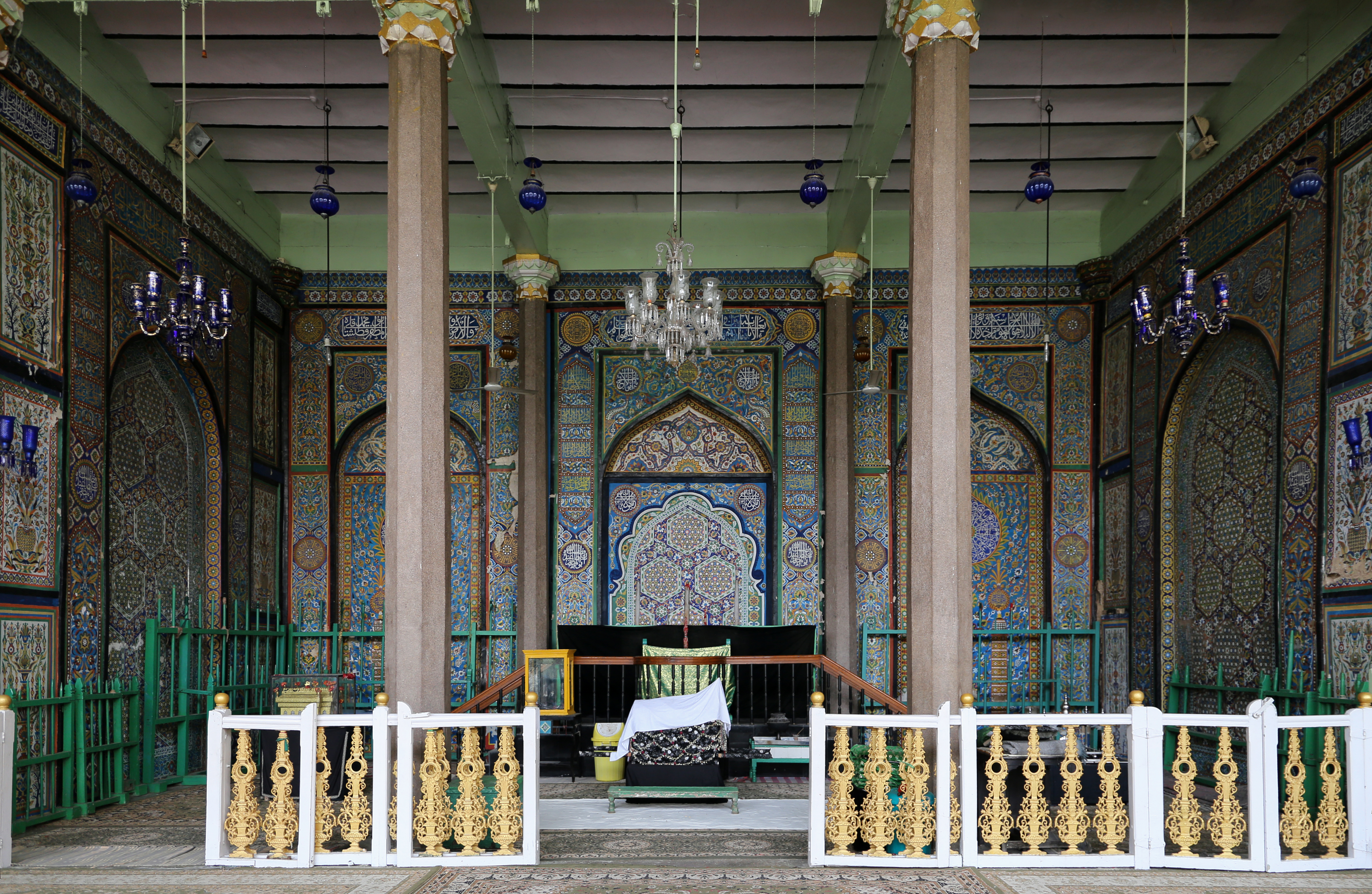
Badshahi Ashurkhana, the first Imambargah in the subcontinent, built in 1591

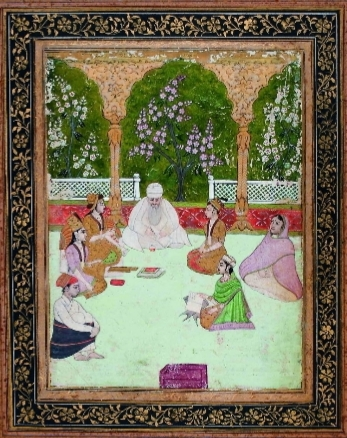
Co-education in Golconda: this painting represents a scene in a school with an old teacher seated in the middle in the mid-17th century, Sir Ratan Tata Art Collection 22.3427

==== The Nizam Shahi dynasty (1490–1633) ====
Another dynasty in the Deccan, the Nizam Shahis of Ahmadnagar, was founded in 1490 by Ahmad Nizam Shah, the son of a Hindu convert to Islam. His son, Burhan Shah, became a staunch Isma'ili Shi'a under the influence of Shah Tahir, the imam of the Muhammad-Shahi (Mu'mini) line of Nizaris. Their independence was lost when the Mughal Emperor Akbar forced them to pay tribute. In 1633 AD their kingdom was finally annexed by the Mughal Emperor Shah Jahan.

=== Mughal Empire Phase-I (1526–1707 AD) ===
In March 1526 AD, Babur defeated the last monarch of the Delhi Sultanate, Ibrahim Lodhi, at Panipat and one year later defeated the Rajput hero Rana Sanga near Sikri. He became the first Mughal Emperor of India but died shortly after, in 1530 AD at Agra. Majority of his army commanders were Turani Begs, however, some of them were Iranians. His son Humayun succeeded him, who inherited his military and Sufi-hanafi orientation. However, he met a crushing defeat at the hands of Sher Shah Suri in 1540, due to disputes among his brothers, and fled to Iran where Shah Tahmasp welcomed him warmly. In 1545 AD, Hamayun with the help of Iranian military genius Bayram Khan, launched attack on Qandhar and then seized Kabul. He conquered Delhi in 1555 AD and died the next year, leaving the throne to his young son Akbar, who was to rule India for almost half a century and become one of the greatest Emperors, Plato's philosopher king, of India. Him and his contemporary in Deccan, Muhammad Quli Qutb Shah, are perhaps the most enlightened and progressive Kings in Indian history.

In his childhood, two influential Sunni clerics persuaded him to turn a blind eye to their atrocities against Shias. In 1564 AD, a Shia philosopher and mathematician, Mir Murtaza Shirazi, moved to Akbar's court. When he died in 1567 AD, he was buried near the great poet Amir Khusrow. Shaykh Abd un Nabi and Mulla Makhdum-ul Mulk insisted that his dead body be taken out and buried somewhere else, the young Emperor ordered and his grave was dug up. Around 1570 AD, a Shia jurist, Mir Habsh Turbati was killed, and in Kashmir, Akbar's envoy Mirza Muqim. The two clerics would not tolerate difference of opinion, and using their influence in the court of the young king, they forced Fayzi and Abu-ul Fazl into going underground. However, soon the king had enough of their bigotry and he started questioning what he had been taught. In 1575 AD, he built a debating hall by the name of Ibadatkhana, where he would hold discussions between men of knowledge from all backgrounds.

The Mughal state was secular, perhaps the pioneer of secularism, and did not facilitate hate crimes, but a cold war between Shia and Sunni elite continued. Mughal Emperors except Aurangzeb, were indifferent to sectarian disputes and did not encourage sectarian violence.

==== Shia revival in Punjab ====
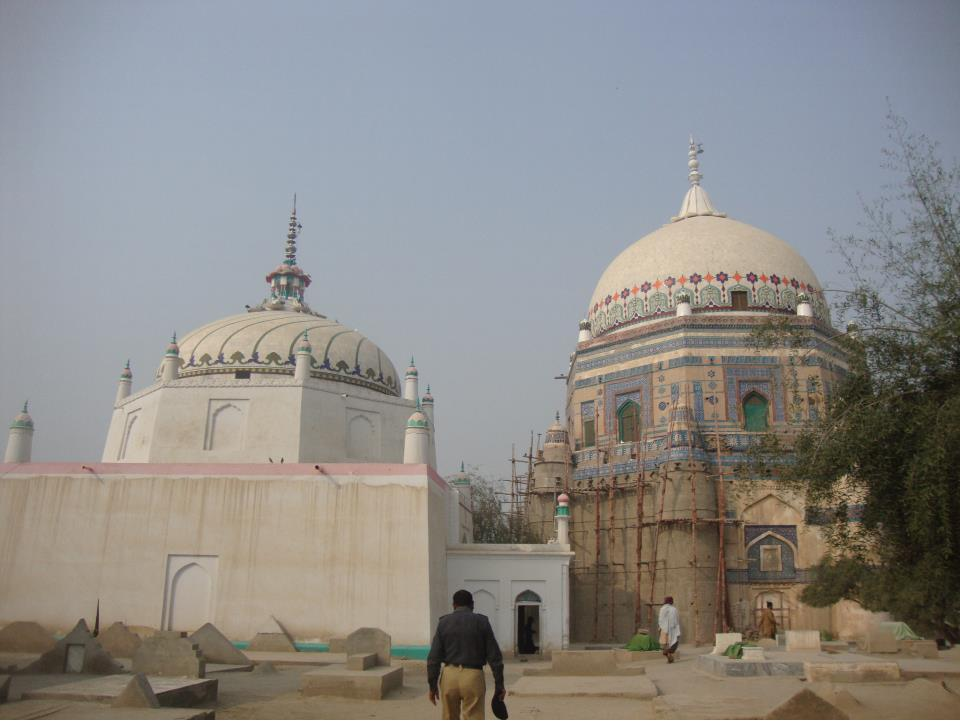
Shrine of Syed Raju Shah Bukhari in Layyah

In the sixteenth century, an influential Shia saint Syed Raju Shah Bukhari of Layyah launched a campaign against unnecessary taqiyya amongst the Shia and invited them to express their beliefs more openly. Another saint, Syed Mahbub-i Alam Shah Jiwana (1490 – 1564 AD) settled in a village near Jhang. During this time, many saints and syeds professed their faith and identified as Shia openly. They and their disciples proselytized across the agricultural heartlands of Punjab.

==== Shia intelligentsia in Akbar's court ====
During the reign of the curious and just Akbar the Great (1556–1605 AD), men of knowledge from all over India gathered at his Ibadat khana in the then Maughal capital, Fatehpur Sikri. Among them were three Shia scholars: Shah Fathullah Shirazi, Qazi Nurullah Shustari and Mullah Ahmad Thattavi.

The foundations of Shi'i theology in present-day Pakistan were laid by Qazi Nurullah Shustari who stayed in Lahore from 1586 AD to 1599 AD. He was born in a scholarly family of Iran in 1549 AD. In 1584 AD, he moved from Mash'had to India and arrived in Akbar's court the next year. In 1586 AD, Akbar shifted his capital to Lahore and appointed him as the Qazi (chief jurist) of the city. He accepted the position on the condition that he will follow his own judgement (Ijtihad) and not adhere to a particular school of jurisprudence. He reformed the judiciary system and made sure that justice was served to the masses. Mulla Badauni says:

"He has reduced the insolent jurists and subtle and crafty judges to order and has eradicated their corruption and has put constraints on their conduct. He is well-known for his neutrality, modesty, piety, justice, virtue, and qualities of a noble man. He is well known for his scholarship, decision power, insight, and clarity of thought. He has authored many tracts and also possesses poetic faculty."

In that era, due to conflict between Ottoman Empire and Safavid Empire, several books targeting Shias were circulating in India and the Middle East. Shushtari set out to confront the most important of them. He opposed the practice of taqiyya in an era wherein a just King treated all his subjects equally regardless of their beliefs. He said:

(Persian:

شهنشهی کہ زپاس حمایتش در هند

نبرده شاهد ایمان من تقیه بکار

"blessed be the King whose patronage in India

has allowed my faith to not depend on taqiyya"

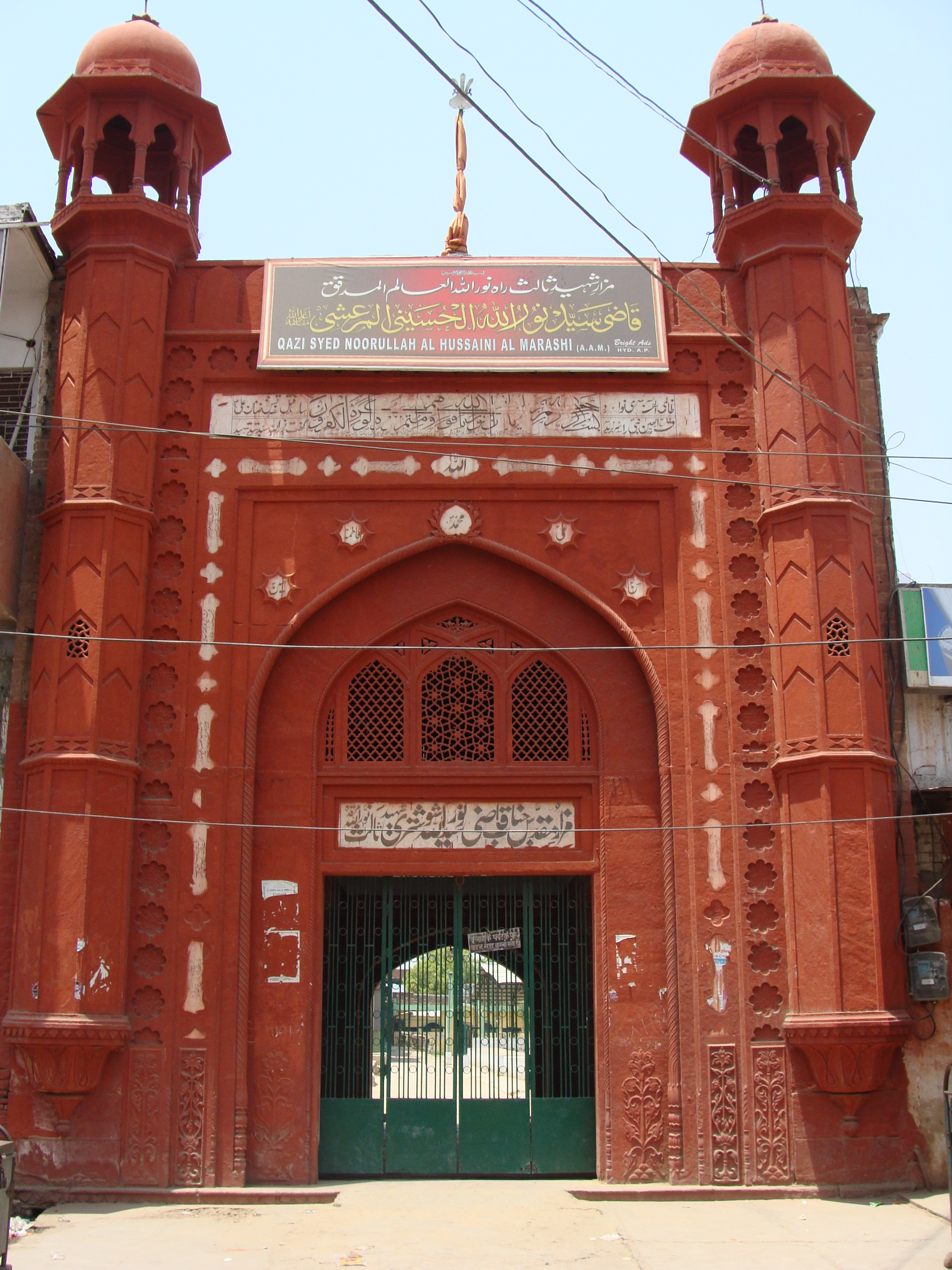
The tomb of Qazi Nurullah Shustari in Agra

He wrote "Masaib-un Nawasib(مصائب النواصب)" in response to "al-Nawaqiz fi Radd ala-al Rawafiz(النواقض فی رد علی الروافض)", "Sawarim-ul Mohriqa(صوارم المہرقہ) " in response to "al-Sawaiq-ul Muhriqa(الصواعق المحرقہ)" and his magnum opus, "Ihqaq-ul Haq(احقاق الحق)" in response to "Ibtal-al Nahjl-al Batil(ابطال النہج الباطل)". He also wrote "Majalis-ul Momineen(مجالس المومنین)" on the history of Shias and exegesis of some parts of Quran. He was not just writing books, he was continuously in touch with Shias of India by writing and responding to their letters. They sought his guidance in religious matters. For example, his correspondence with Syed Hasan, grandson of Syed Raju Shah Bukhari, the Kashmiri Shia clergy, and his famous debate "Asa'la-e Yusufiyya", with Akhbari Shia theologian Mir Yusuf Ali Astarabadi.

Towards the end of his rule, Akbar appointed the Qazi to investigate mishandling of governments funds and property in Agra and other places. It appears that he made many enemies, while holding them accountable. After Akbar's death, in 1605 AD, life became harder for him and eventually, he was sentenced to public flogging by Jahangir. He could not tolerate this humiliation and died while bearing lashes on his back in 1610 AD at the age of sixty-one.

Mullah Ahmed Thattavi was son of the Sunni jurist of Thatta. He was introduced to Shia faith by an Iraqi merchant. After completing his basic education in Thatta, he went to Mashhad at the age of 22 and attended a course of Ibn Sina's book on medical science, The Canon. He then went to Qazvin, Iraq and finally Makkah, visiting places and attending different courses. Upon his return to India, he first went to the Qutb Shahi court in Golkonda and then in 1583, he joined Akbar's court. In the debates about the history of Islam, he used to advocate Shia point of view with missionary zeal. In 1589 AD, he was assassinated in Lahore, his grave was exhumed and his body mutilated and then put to fire by his opponents.

Shah Fathullah Shirazi was one of the leading intellectuals of India, expert on the books of Ibn Sina and Shaikh-i-Ishraq as well as mathematics and astronomy of the time. He lived in Bijapur city of Adil Shahi Sultanate of Deccan. Akbar invited him to his court in Fathpur Sikri. He arrived in 1583 AD. The jagirdars on his way were ordered to welcome him and escort his caravan. He was appointed the Amin-ul Mulk (trustee of the empire), Azud-ud Daula (arm of the empire) and a joint finance minister with Raja Todar Mal. He was tasked with financial reforms. In May 1589, Shah Fathullah fell ill and died, while accompanying the Emperor on his visit to Kashmir. His death was a great loss for Akbar. Although his strict observance of religious discipline and rituals in his daily life was distasteful to the Emperor, he was given full freedom by the secular king. He actively took part in the discussions at the Ibadat khana. He designed and improved weapons, made new astronomical tables and researched on pedagogical approaches for children with special needs. His students kept his tradition alive and as a result, rational sciences became a part of the madrassa curriculum until the 19th century AD, when Shah Waliullah's puritanism replaced them with orthodoxy.

==== Anti-Shi'ism of the Orthodoxy ====
Shaikh Ahmad Sirhindi wrote a treatise under the title "Radd-e-Rawafiz" to justify the execution of Shia nobles by Abdullah Khan Uzbek in Mashhad. According to him, the worst distorters of faith "are those who bear malice against the companions of Prophet Muhammad. God has called them Kafirs in the Quran". In a letter to Shaikh Farid Bukhari, he said that showing respect to the distortors of faith (ahl-e-Bidʻah) amounted to destruction of Islam.

==== Jahangir and Shah Jahan ====
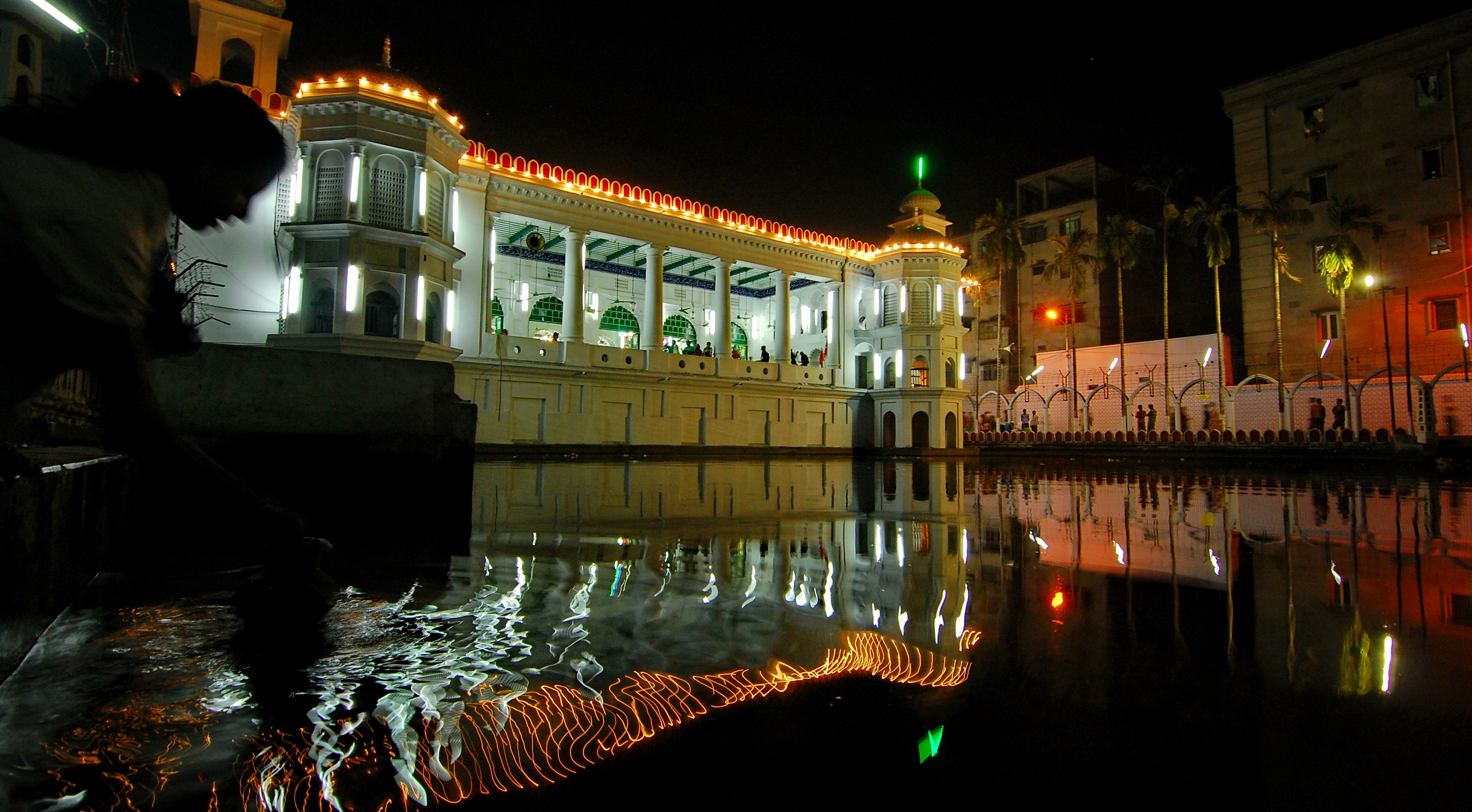
Imambaraa Hussaini Dalan in Dhaka, built by Mir Murad under patronage of Shah Shuja, who was governor of Bengal in Shah Jahan's era.

Jahangir and Shah Jahan both continued Akbar's policy of coexistence and secularism. Although Jahangir executed Qazi Nurullah Shushtari, it was not for religious reasons; rather, he disliked many of his father's associates and acted against them. As an eighteenth century editor of Jahangirnama puts it:

"the new sovereign possibly wished to draw a line under the rule of his father and all those associated needed to be sidelined".

Jahangir's jailing of the aforementioned Ahmad Sirhindi, is also indicative of his indifference towards sectarian conflicts. Francisco Pelsaert, a Dutch merchant who lived in Agra between 1620 and 1627 AD, gives an account of people openly commemorating Muharram:

"In commemoration of this tragedy, they wail all night for a period of ten days. The women recite lamentations and display grief. The men carry two decorated coffins on the main roads of the city with many lamps. Large crowds attend these ceremonies, with great cries of mourning and noise. The chief event is on the last night, when it seems as if a Pharoah[sic] had killed all the infants in one night. The outcry lasts till the first quarter of the day".

A similar liberty was noticed when Mahmud Balkhi visited Lahore in Muharram 1625 AD, he wrote:

"The whole city was commemorating Muharram with passion and enthusiasm. Tazias were taken out on the 10th and the shops were closed. However, a stampede due to failure of crowd control resulted in deaths of around 75 people".

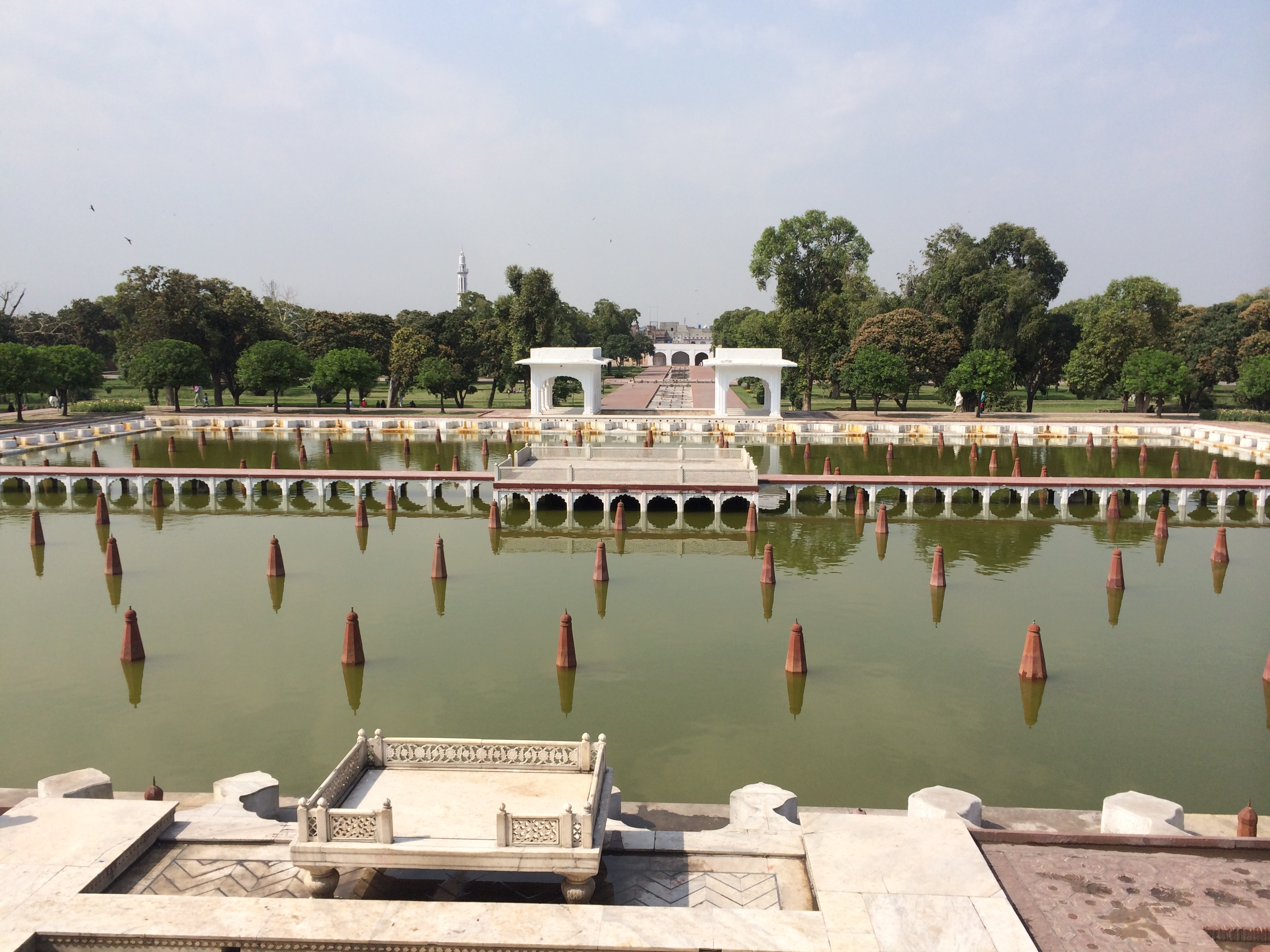
The Shalimar Garden in Lahore

Qazi Nurullah's son, Ala-ul Mulk, was appointed tutor of Shah Shuja, the second son of Shahjahan. Ala-ul Mulk and one of his brothers lived in Dhaka and introduced the Shi'i creed there. During Shah Jahan's rule over North India, Shi'ism was introduced in Bengal under patronage of his son Shah Shuja, and the second Imambargah of the subcontinent, Hussaini Dalan, was built in the capital city of Dhaka. In Shah Jahan's court, sometimes religious debates took place and the Emperor does not seems to be taking sides. The most influential Shia of Shahjahan's era was Ali Mardan Khan. He was appointed governor of Kashmir and Punjab. In Lahore, he built the famous Shalimar Garden and the Shahi Canal. He also rebuilt the road from Sirinagar to Lahore. In Kashmir too, he built gardens and a caravanserai in the name of twelve Shia Imams. Another important Shia noble of the time was Mir Jumla Said Khan, also known as Muazzam Khan Khan-i Khanan. He was an influential general in the Qutb Shahi dynasty and after alienation in Abdullah Qutb Shah's court, he shifted his loyalty to the Mughal court. His role in bringing Aurangzeb to power and annexation of Deccan was instrumental.

==== Aurangzeb's religiosity ====
Aurangzeb (1658 – 1707 AD) was an able ruler, often compared to his great-grandfather Akbar, but he differed from him in his worldview. When he saw the khudadad mahal of Hyderabad, an important Shia building, he ordered its destruction. Aurangzeb gathered a board of Sunni jurists and tasked them with a compilation of Hanafi rulings later known as Fatawa Alamgiri. This was a detailed document, consisting of some 30 volumes. It changed the statecraft of the Mughal Empire and elevated the status of Hanafi Maturidi Sunni Islam, sometimes to the detriment of other faiths and sects. Some Shias opted to practice taqiyya to preserve court positions, such as Ruhullah Khan, whose Shi'ism only came to light when he was buried as a Shia according to his will. As a ruler, Aurangzeb spent most of his reign campaigning in the Deccan, where some of the rulers were Shias. He wrote:

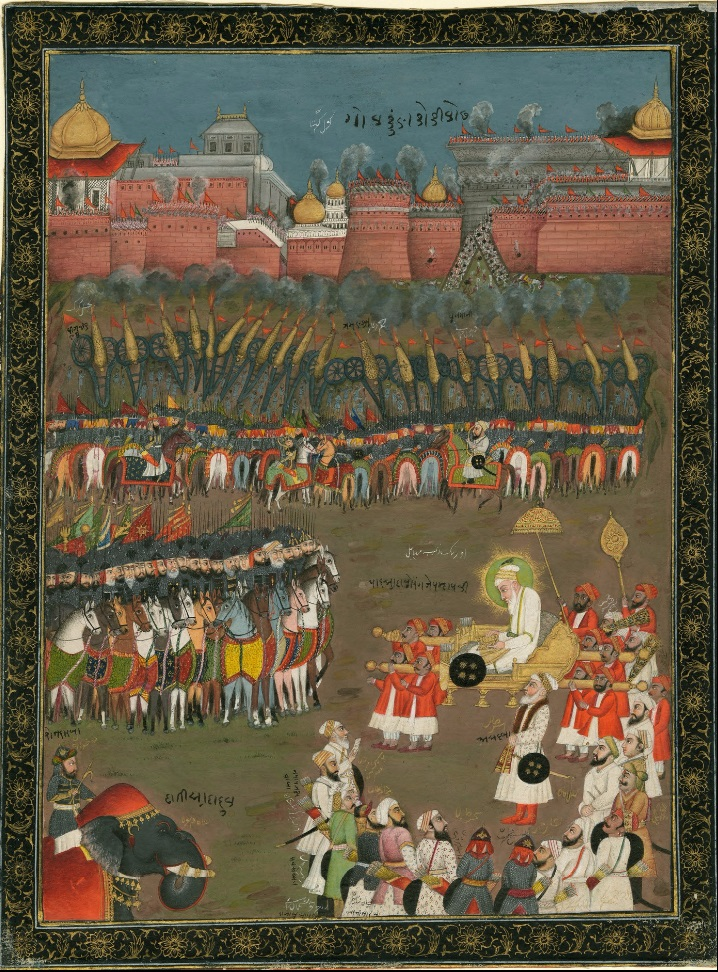
Aurangzeb during the siege of Golconda, 1687.

"[Qutb-ul-Mulk] popularized rifz and criticism of the companions of Prophet, both being a sign of infidelity and heresy, to the extent that the entire kingdom had abandoned the Sunni faith".

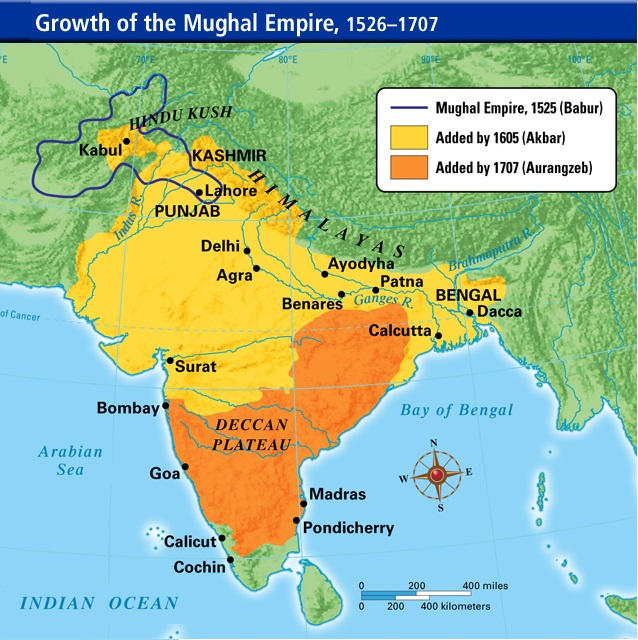
Mughal Empire till 1700 AD

However, while some of Aurangzeb's policies targeted these communities, he did appoint learned and skillful individuals from those communities as officers. In 1646 AD, Aurangzeb ordered the assassination the leader of the Dawoodi Bohra Isma'ili Shia sect, Qutub Khan Qutbuddin. In the aftermath, the Bohra community, who were sea-faring merchants, resorted to taqiya. In some instances, they were heavily fined and their books were confiscated. Between 1701 and 1706 AD, the Shi'i governor of Kashmir, Ibrahim Khan, appointed a board of Shia theologians to compile the "Bayaz-e-Ibrahimi", in which rare manuscripts were collected from different sources.

==== Shi'ism in Kurram Valley ====
The turi Shia tribe of Turkish origin were living in the tribal areas of the Indus valley from medieval times as nomadic tribes, but by the end of Aurangzeb's rule, they had established themselves in Kurram valley and introduced Shi'ism in the valley.

=== Mughal Empire Phase-II (1707–1857 AD) ===
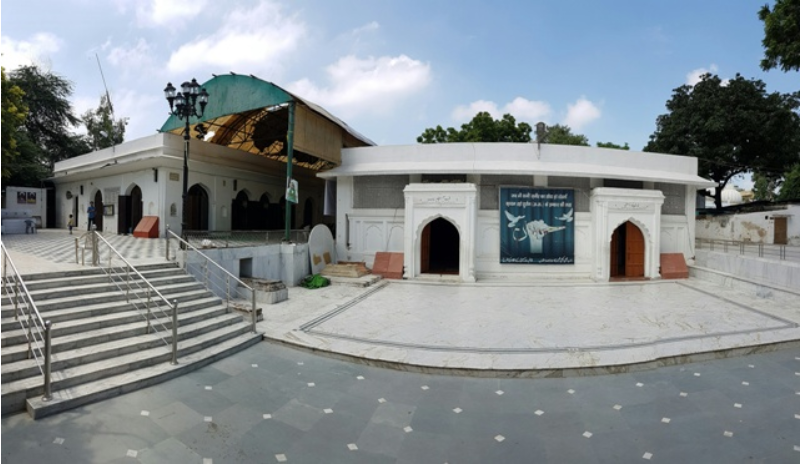
Imambada Shah-e Mardan in Delhi, built around 1726 AD.

Aurangzeb's successor Bahadur Shah was a tafzili Sunni. He had made peace with Rajputs and invited Sikh guru Gobind Singh to his court. The Maratha leader Shahu was busy with crushing rebels at home. Sikhs resumed their revolt under Banda, and Bahadur Shah had to move to Lahore to contain it. He is also said to have visited the famous Shia saint, Barri Shah Latif, then living in a village at the feet of Margala Hills (present day Islamabad) and paid tributes.

Aurangzeb's bigotry had fueled a cold war between Shia and Sunni elite in North India. Bahadur Shah tried to sort out the Shia-Sunni problem but his death in 1712 AD left the question undecided. From there on to Nadir Shah's invasion of 1739 AD, the business of Empire was taken over by conspiracies of king-makers. Religious and racial sensitivities were manipulated to meet selfish ends. This state of affairs was perfect for sectarian conflicts to grow. It seemed that the kharjis of the pre-Akbar era had re-surfaced. During Farukhsiyar's reign (1713–1719 AD), the most prominent Sufi saint was Khawaja Muhammad Jafar. A cleric from Multan by the name of Shaykh Abdullah visited Delhi and could not stand the reverence of the twelve Imams on his dargah. He went to Delhi's Friday mosque and started to campaign against the Khawaja, which resulted in violence. When he went back to Multan, he continued the hate speech. He was arrested and sent back to Delhi to be put behind the bars. On his way, his followers attacked the police to free him, but the attempt failed to leave many dead. The Shaykh was put in prison.

In 1714 AD, the Maratha civil war had ended. The weakened Mughals now recognized them as part of Mughal Empire. Shahu was given tax collecting power over the large piece of land he already controlled. But the boundaries between the provinces were always disputed, thus Marathas continued their expansion. Mughal Empire started to become decentralized and a number of successor states emerged. Their rulers had considerable autonomy and sought legitimacy by being ceremonially appointed by the Emperor. In 1723 AD, Nizam-ul Mulk, the strongest Sunni noble at Delhi's court and Mughal Viceroy of the Deccan, declared himself as a shadow king of the area, founding Hyderabad State. When the Emperor sent an army to crush his soft coup, it was defeated. However, because of constant Maratha threat, he did not claim independent and chose to stay quasi-independent. Following this the Shia Nawabs of Bengal and Nawabs of Awadh were also awarded hereditary governorship and local autonomy in their respective areas. Like Nizam, they too appointed their own administration in their state, while paying tributes to the Emperor. Meanwhile, the European trading companies had started to recruit armies from local population in Bombay, Madras and Bengal. The Empire entered into an era of perpetual war, mistrust and treachery. However, it was also an era of emergence of new cultural capitals, like Lucknow, Murshidabad, Hyderabad and Poone.

==== Shia rule in Bengal ====
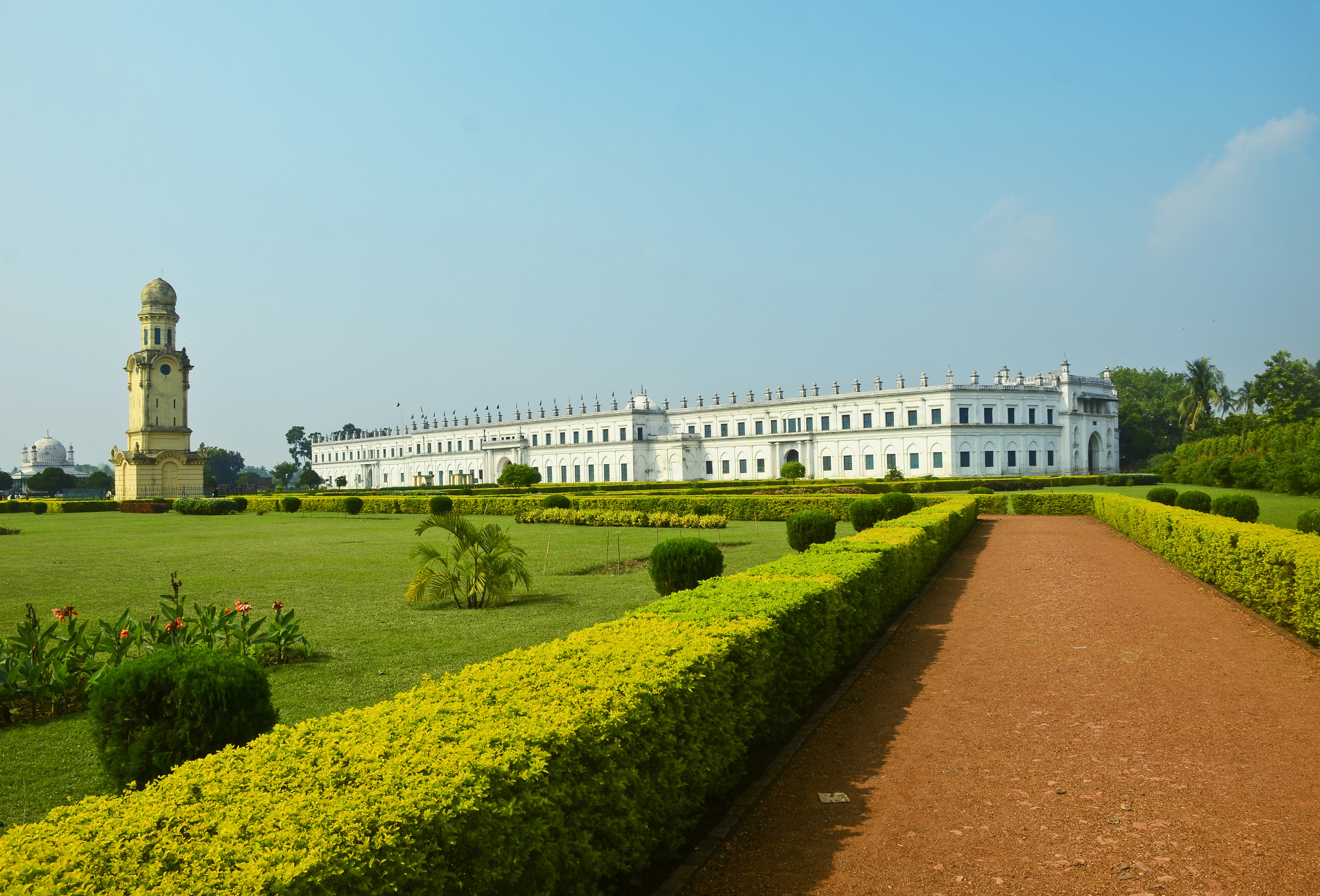
Nizammat Imambara of Murshidabad is the biggest imambargah in the Subcontinent.

Shi'ism was introduced to Bengal during the governorship of Shah Shuja (1641–1661 AD), son of Shah Jahan. However, from 1707 AD to 1880 AD, the Nawabs of Bengal were Shias. They built huge Imambargahs, including the biggest of the Subcontinent built by Nawab Siraj-ud Daula, the Nizammat Imambara. The nawabs of Bengal and Iranian merchants in Bengal patronised azadari and the political capital Murshidabad and the trading hub Hoogly attracted Shia scholars from within and outside India.

The first Nawab, Murshid Quli Khan, was adopted by a Shia merchant Haji Shafi Isfahani and was brought up as a Shia. The fifth nawab, Ali Vardi Khan (1740 – 1756 AD) is among the best rulers India has produced. He was a hard working and far-sighted man. Bengal at that time was richest state of India, as the center of trade it attracted investments from Asian and European companies, and that was why it was attacked by the Marathas, the Afghan Rohillas and finally the East India Company (EIC) managed to conquer it after his demise. During the Anglo-French and Anglo-Indian wars in Madras region and beyond, and their gradually increasing invisible control over these regions, Ali Vardi Khan studied the developments with the help of his spies. While he encouraged trade with Europeans, he did not let them build military-purpose fortress in Bengal. If they tried doing it, he would demolish it and say to them:

"You are merchants, what need have you of a fortress? Being under my protection, you have no enemies to fear".

He was a practising Shia, he offered prayers and recited Quran everyday and held meetings with learned men for discussions. At the times of war and crisis, he used to pray whole night on a piece of earth from the grave of Imam Hussain at Karbala. During his reign, many Shia scholars came to Bengal and started teaching in 'maktabs', mosques and imambaras. He did not discriminate against Hindus or others on the basis of religion, and this was one of his points of strength. However, the EIC managed to exploit tensions based on religion and when his naive and young grandson Nawab Siraj-ud Daula came to power, many members of Hindu elite, especially Jagat Seth and Amir Chand, supported the great conspiracy of 1757 AD, and the EIC annexed Bengal. Keeping the puppet nawabs on their thrones, now the East India Company were indirectly ruling parts of Southern and Eastern India without exposing themselves to the volatile power struggle between the Afghans, the Marathas and the Shias. This strategy of camouflage was adopted to gain maximum economic advantage of the situation. A decade of exploitation followed. Bengal, the once richest province of India, suffered from famine in 1770 AD, and one third of its peasants died and others driven to cannibalism.

==== Afghan invasions ====
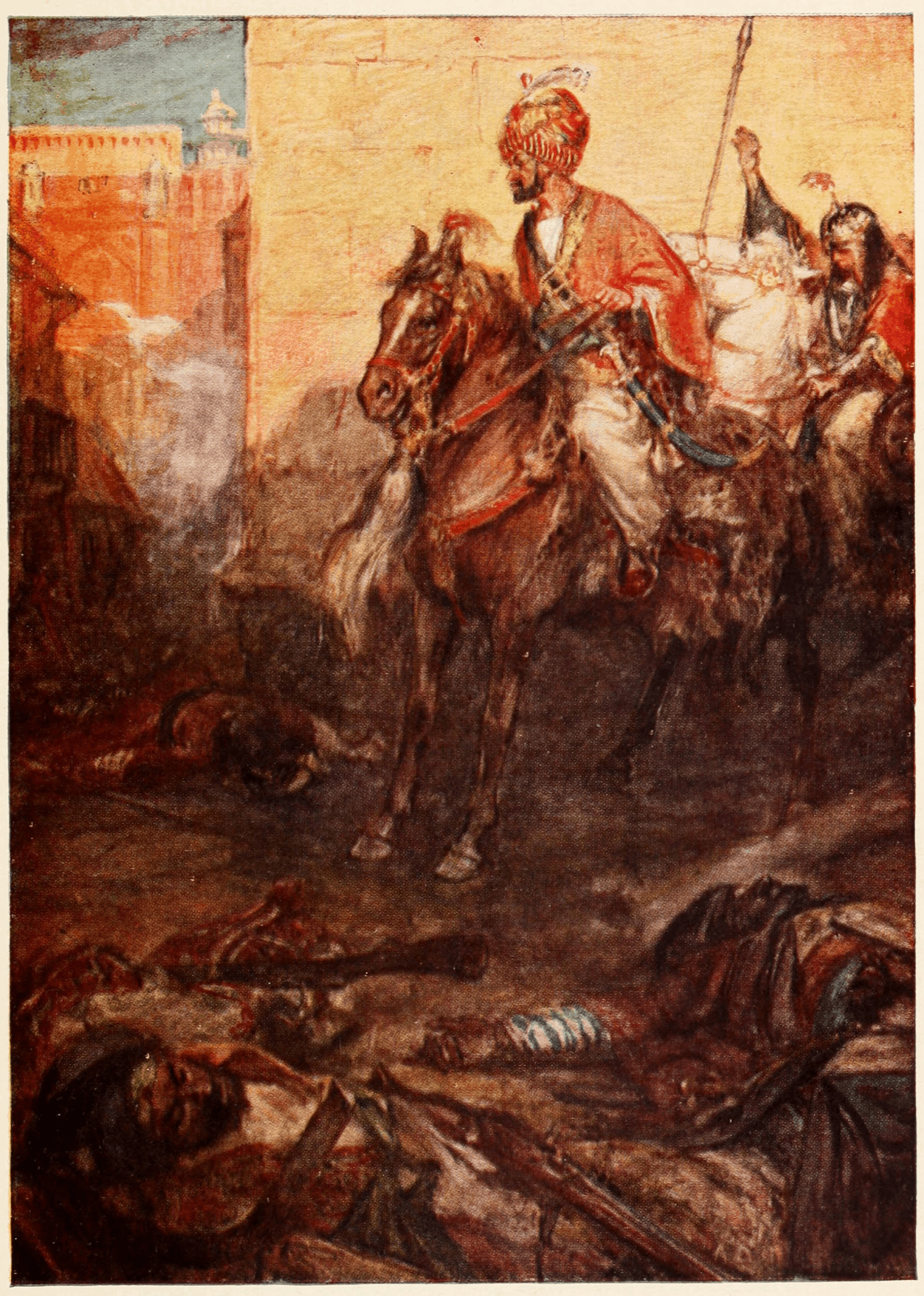
Nader Shah finds his troops being killed in Delhi riots after rumours of his death spread. This led him to order the slaughter that took 30,000 lives.

After the end of Safavid rule over Iran, a general of the Safavids, Nadir Shah, had crowned himself as the Emperor of Persia in 1736 AD and wrote to the Mughal Emperor to expel the Afghan rebels of Iran who had hidden themselves in areas under Mughal control. When Muhammad Shah, who was busy with revolts at home, failed to respond, he used this as a pretext to attack Delhi and plunder it. The Shia nawab of Awadh, Sa'adat Ali Khan tried to defend Delhi but was stabbed in the back by Nizam-ul Mulk, who prevented the Emperor from sending reinforcements and the nawab ended up arrested. Nader Shah's campaigns to unify Iran had cost him much and he desperately needed wealth to overcome financial crisis at home, which he took from Delhi. After his assassination in 1747 AD, the commander of his Afghan troops Ahmed Shah Abdali Durrani proclaimed independence and founded Afghanistan in parts of Iran and India. To fill his treasury he attacked and looted the Indus Valley seven times. His invasions were supported by the Afghan Rohillas in Delhi who had rebellious tendencies since last days of Aurangzeb. Ahmed Shah Abdali attacked Punjab in 1747 AD and advanced towards Delhi, but the Shia nawab of Awadh and commander of the Mughal army Safdar Jang defeated him at Manpur near Sirhind. After this event, the Rohillas attacked Awadh but were pushed back. Safdar Jang made alliance with Marathas against Abdali and his Rohilla agents. Abdali invaded Punjab again by the end of 1748 AD and created havoc. In 1751 AD, he invaded Punjab the third time and this time the Mughal governor Mir Mannu ceded Lahore and Multan to him and regained governorship under Abdali.

With increasing sectarian strife at the Mughal court, the Sunni faction managed to enthrone Alamgir-II as the Emperor, and persuaded him to ban the commemoration of Muharram in Delhi. The old Emperor tried to marry a princess Hazrat Begum, who was famous for her beauty, but she prevented the marriage by threatening to commit suicide.

In 1757 AD Abdali reached Delhi and ordered his forces to unleash carnage. For more than a month, Afghans went from home to home, taking whatever wealth people had, even if it was buried in the ground, and raping women. Sikh militias attacked Abdali's forces on their way back to Afghanistan, and free some of the Hindu or Sikh women that were taken as sex-slaves. Abdali invaded Delhi in 1759 AD again, looted the city, expelled its Shia population, forcibly married the 16-year-old beauty Princess Hazrat Begum. Alamgir-II was murdered and his son Shah Alam-II exiled to Awadh and the Rohilla Najib-ud Dawla and Imad-ul Mulk were appointed as chief executives. Marathas tried to liberate Delhi and the Emperor, but were defeated by the united Shia-Sunni force in 1761 AD in the historic third battle of Panipat. Unlike his father, the young Shia nawab of Awadh Shuja-ud Daula supported Abdali and Rohillas against the patriotic Marathas for religious reasons, but Abdali proved to be a sectarian bigot when he expelled the Shia population of Delhi and appointed the ruthless Rohillas on the demands of Shah Waliullah. Shah Waliullah died in 1762 AD, but there was no room for Shias in Delhi until the Rohilla chief Najib-ud Daula died in 1770 AD and Ahmed Shah Abdali in 1772 AD. What followed was emergence of Sikh power in Punjab and a power struggle in Qandahar which stopped his heirs from attacking Indus valley. In 1771 AD, Marathas drove Rohillas out of Delhi and put the Mughal Emperor back to throne. He appointed a Shia general Mirza Najaf Khan as his minister and the relieved Shias abolished Taqiyya.

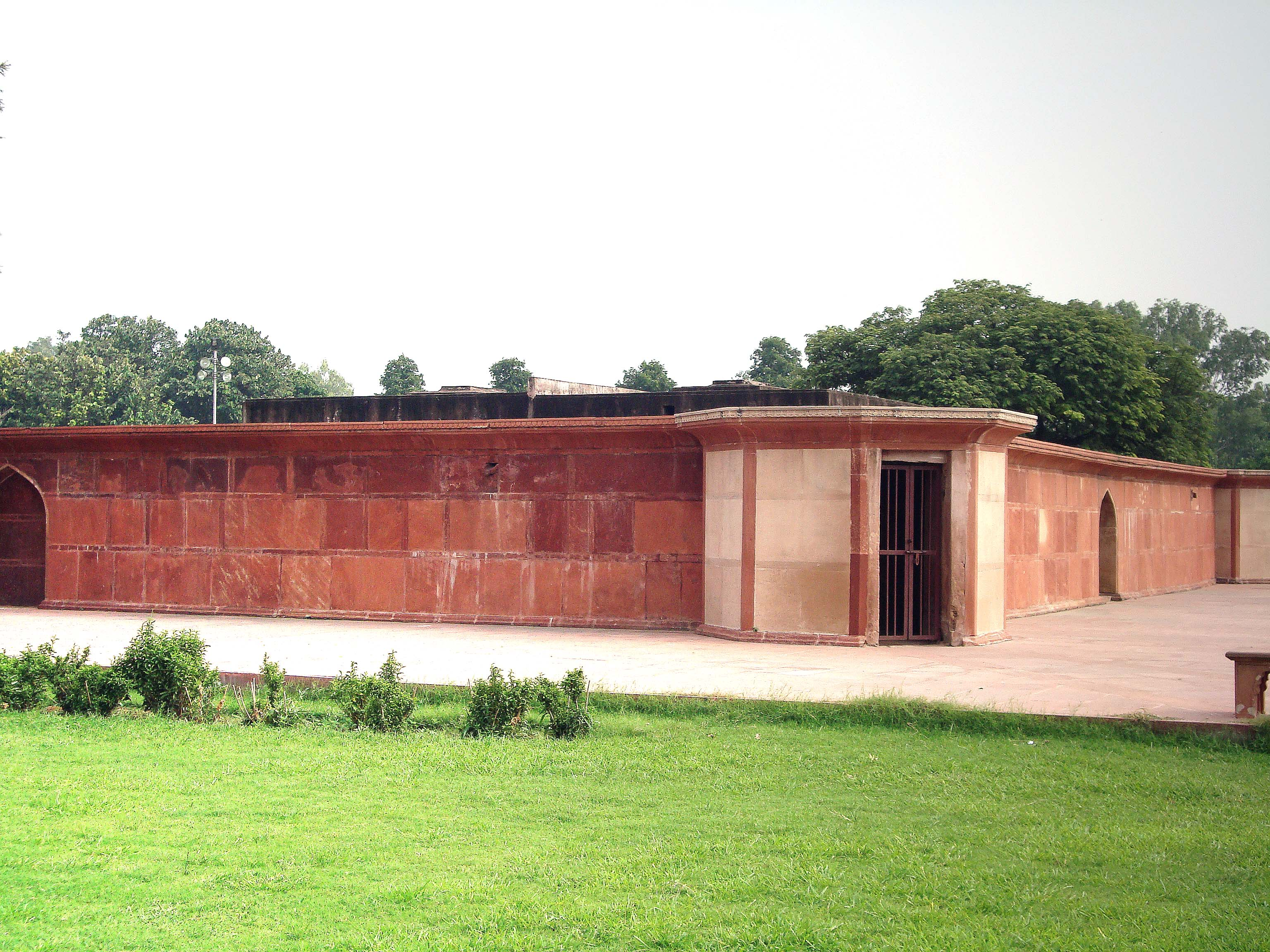
Mirza Najaf Khan's tomb, the commander-in-chief of the Mughal Army during 1772–1782 AD.

In 1788 AD, the Rohillas under Ghulam Qadir sacked Delhi again, blinded the Emperor and tortured the imperial family. The Marathas again came to his rescue and the Rohilla chief was ousted and put to death. The Marathas tried to form a united Maratha-Sikh-Afghan front against the British but failed.

Marathas had lost 75,000 troops in Panipat, this crushing defeat exposed them to attacks from Nizam of Hyderabad in the south and a civil war from within. This offered British a chance to expand in Bombay, the Treaty of Salbai signed in 1782 AD neutralized Maratha threat for 20 years.

Meanwhile, Sikh militias controlled Punjab and the era of political anarchy and economic misery ended only after Maharaja Ranjit Singh united Sikh forces and founded the Sikh Empire (1799–1849 AD). He was a secular leader under whom Punjab blossomed again. With Afghans out, Shias of Punjab started to take out processions. A famous Shia saint, Syed La'al Shah from Syed Kasran traveled across Punjab and established many Imambargahs. The influential faqirs of Lahore and the descendants of Shah Jiwana of Jhang also ensured religious freedom for Shias and promoted azadari.

==== Shia rule in Awadh ====
Nawab Sa'adat Ali Khan was awarded hereditary governorship over Awadh in 1717 AD after he led Mughal army against the Zamindars who had recruited their own militias and stopped paying taxes. He was son of a Safavid noble, who had left Iran after Safavid Empire started to lose political authority. He made Fayzabad his capital. Because of turmoil in Iran, many Shia scholars and Syeds immigrated to this city. He died in 1739 AD and his nephew Safdar Jang was appointed the new Nawab by the Mughal Emperor. He was also appointed the prime minister by the Emperor. In 1745, he led a campaign against the Rohilla rebels near Delhi. In 1748 AD, he defeated Ahmad Shah Abdali near Sirhind. As his influence increased in the Mughal court so did the cold war between the Shia and Sunni elites. In 1753 AD, Safdar Jang was forced to leave Delhi for Awadh by the Sunni elites of Delhi. In 1756 AD, he died. His son Shuja-ud Daula succeeded him.

Although Mir Jafar was made the Nawab of Bengal after his treachery at Plassey, the power and money lied in the hands of British and the responsibility to manage the people on this puppet, like in Arcot or Hyderabad. He was soon replaced by Mir Qasim who tried to regain freedom. Shuja-ud Daula and the Mughal Emperor Shah Alam-II supported him in the battle. While the Mughal Empire had lost its military strength due to series of Afghan invasions, the British had foreseen this battle and had employed locals at large scale and trained them on the lines of European warfare. The Indian alliance was defeated Buxer in 1764 AD. Awadh lost its sovereignty and so did Delhi. The British did not annex these areas because they wanted to use Awadh as a buffer between themselves and the Marathas. According to the Allahabad Treaty signed by the Mughal Emperor and Robert Clive, the British troops and advisers, to be paid by Nawab, were deployed in Awadh. The company's right to collect revenue from Bengal, the richest province of India, was now recognized and legitimized by the Emperor.

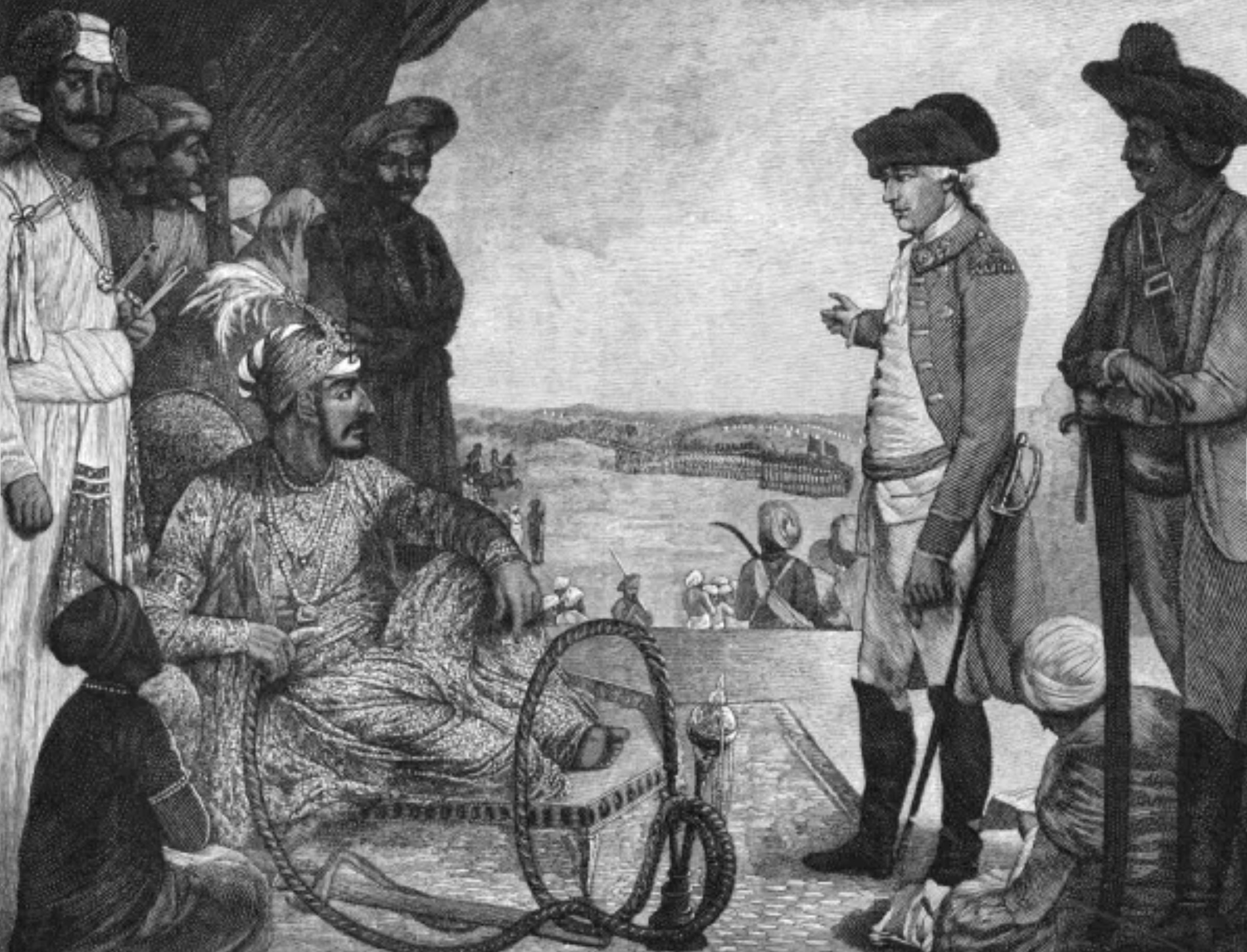
1894 illustration of Shah Alam II reviewing the British East India Company's troops in 1781

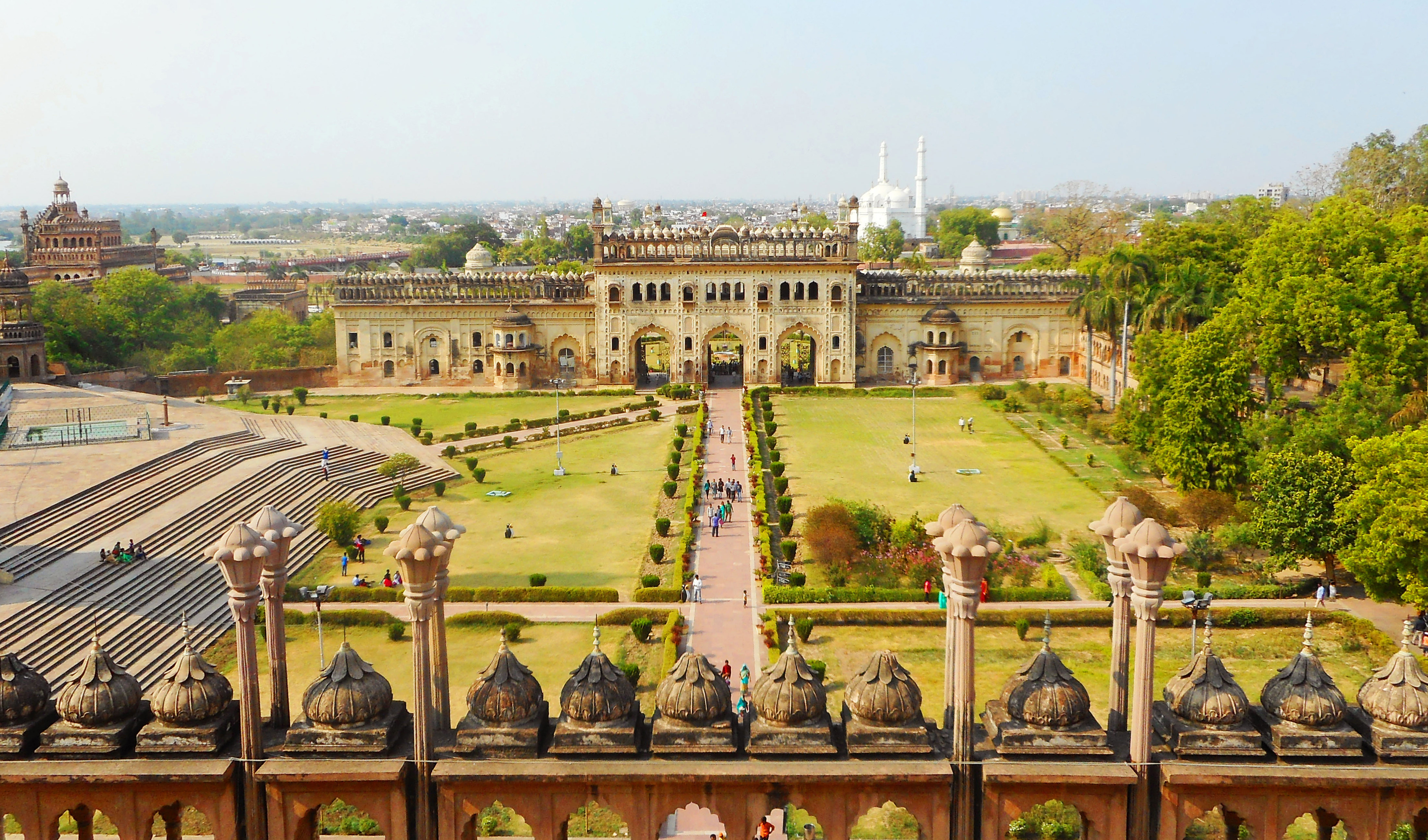
Asafi Imambara and mosque in Lucknow

Now the Nawab of Awadh focused on cultural and economic enrichment of his state. In 1775 AD Asaf-ud-Daula, the fourth Nawab, shifted his court to the city of Lucknow from Faizabad. The judicial, financial and governmental capital of Awadh became the cultural capital of India. Urdu/Hindi language started to evolve in North India as the main mode of communication. The poet Sauda (1713 – 1781 AD), who had moved from Delhi to Lucknow, revived Urdu elegies (marsiya). The seminary of Darul Uloom Firangi Mahal, established by Mulla Nizam ud Din Sehalvi in Aurangzeb's era now became the most important madrassa of Sunni theology in India. Lucknow attracted scholars, artists and poets from all over India as well as Europe. In 1784 AD, famine struck Awadh and the semi-independent nawab worked hard to relieve people of misery. One of his projects was to create jobs by building the magnificent Asafi Imambara and mosque complex.

==== Allama Tafazzul Husain Khan ====
Eminent Shia scholar and scientist of the time, Allama Tafazzul Husain Kashmiri (1727 – 1801), was patronized by the Nawabs of Awadh. He learned and taught philosophy, mathematics and Newtonian physics. He authored the following:

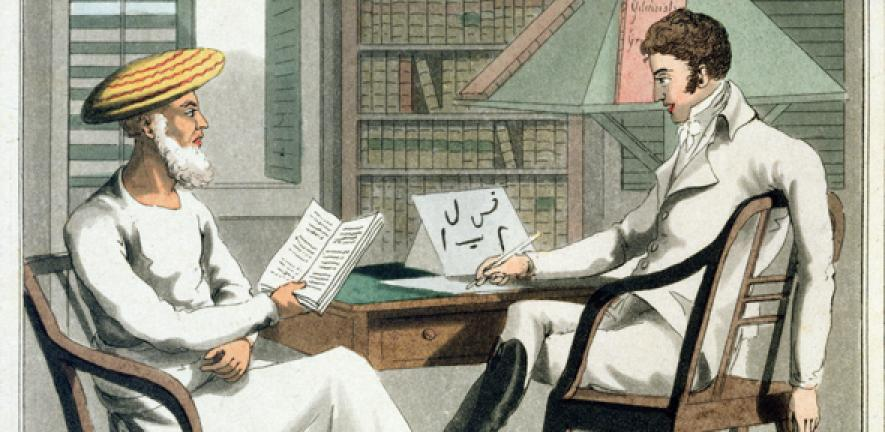
Allama Tafazzul Husain Khan with a British colleague. Painted by Charles D'Oyly.

1. Commentary on Conica of Appollonus.
2. Two treatise on Algebra.
3. Commentary on Conica of Diophantus.
4. Translation of Sir Isaac Newton's Principia.
5. A book on Physics.
6. A book on Western Astronomy.

Some of these books were taught in Shia scholarly circles in the nineteenth century Lucknow. His student Nawab Saadat Ali Khan built an observatory in Lucknow. Another student, Ayatollah Dildar Ali Naqvi Naseerabadi, who learnt philosophy under him, became the first Usuli Shia Marja of India.

==== Shi'ism in Mysore ====
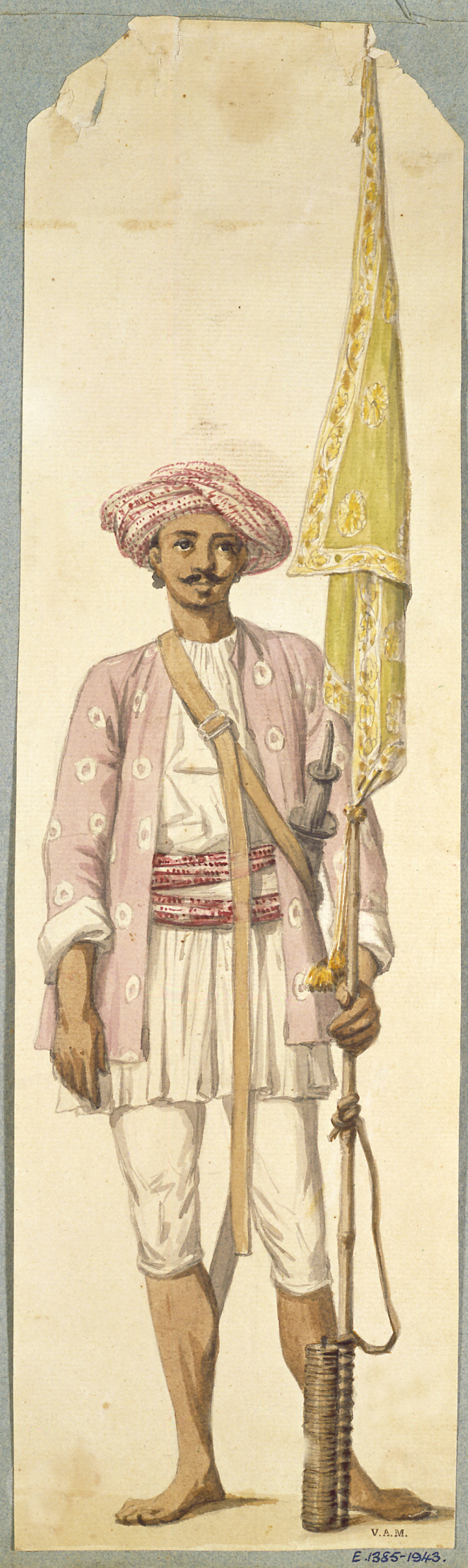
A Mysorean soldier, using his rocket as a flagstaff (Robert Home, 1793/4)

Shi'ism was introduced in Karnataka in 1565 AD when it became part of the Adil Shahi Dynasty. Concurrent to the American War of Independence, a major threat to the rule of the British East India Company emerged under the banner of Hyder Ali (1766–1782 AD), who was the army commander of the Wadiyar Dynasty of Mysore and then founded the Khudadad Sultanate. He and his son Tipu Sultan appeared as the most formidable resistance to the colonial occupation. He was the most farsighted Indian of his time, like Akbar the Great, he realized the importance of secularism, unity and modern science for the multi-cultural subcontinent. He and his son Tipu Sultan were Sufi Sunnis who used to commemorate Muharram. They modernized the army, invented the iron-cased Mysorean rockets and significantly developed Mysore's economy. Tipu had deep love for Ali, he inscribed Asadullah-ul Ghalib(اسد الله الغالب) on weapons. He sent ambassadors to pay homage to Ali and Hussain in Iraq and ordered them to seek permission from Ottoman Emperor to build a canal from Euphrates to Najaf to meet the needs of clean water in the holy city.

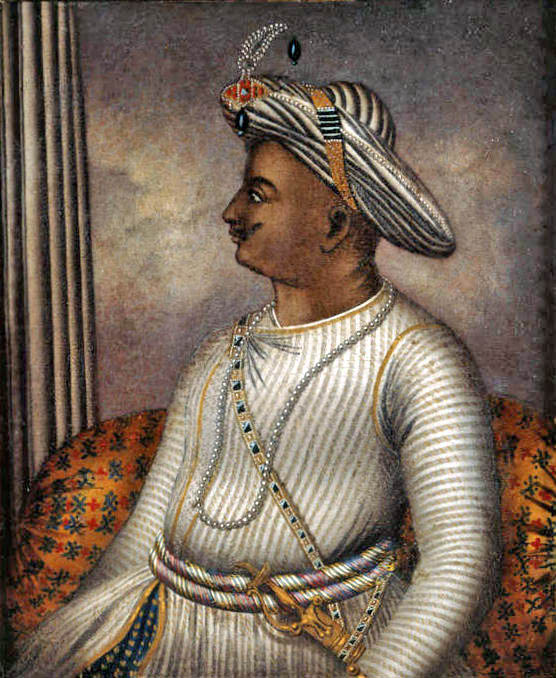
Portrait of Tipu Sultan

At that point in time, Iran was in turmoil and many Syeds and scholars migrated to different parts of India, some ended up in Mysore, which was building its military muscle. Looking for careers in military, many Syeds joined the army and some 2000 Iranian horse traders settled in Srirangapatna Fort. Tipu tried to form a Mysore- Hyderabad- Pune alliance against the British East India Company, though this effort ultimately failed. He also contacted the French counterpart, Napoleon, the Iranian Fath Ali Shah and the Afghan Zaman Shah for help, but the British managed to encircle and defeat him. In the last Anglo-Mysore war in 1799 AD, Mir Sadiq, Purnaiah and Qamar-ud Din Khan sided with the British East India Company. Syed Ghaffar, Syed Hamid and Muhammad Raza remained loyal to him till the end. The Syeds fought hard under Syed Ghaffar and after his death, Tipu himself lead the few soldiers defending the fort, but was unsuccessful and died. Although Marathas had joined the British 1792 AD against Tipu, they had stayed neutral this time. However, when the news of Tipu's death reached Pune, Baji Rao said that he had lost his right arm. Marathas and Sikhs were going to be the next victims.

After the death of the tiger of Mysore, Tipu Sultan, Shias left Srirangapatna Fort and settled in the Mysore city, and some migrated to Bangalore. A Shia scholar Mir Zain-ul Abideen Abid was appointed Mir Munshi by the Wadiyar king and he constructed an imambargah "Rashk-e Bahisht" in Mysore around 1812 AD.

==== Shia rule in Sindh ====
The Talpur dynasty was a Shia Muslim dynasty based on the region of Sindh, which ruled Sindh and parts of Punjab region, from 1783 to 1843. The Talpur army defeated the Kalhora Dynasty in the Battle of Halani in 1783 to become rulers of Sindh. Later it split into three smaller states of Mirpur, Hyderabad and Khairpur. The Talpur dynasty was defeated by the British in 1843 at the Battle of Miani. Azadari was greatly patronized by the Mirs. The descendants of Mirza Faridun Beg, who was an influential elite at the court of Mir Karam Ali Talpur, contributed a lot to popularization of Muharram rituals.

=== Colonial Period – British Raj ===
==== Shi'ism in Gilgit Baltistan ====
The Dogras and their British allies started to expand their influence in Gilgit around 1848 AD, when Nagar was occupied. In 1853, Gauhar Aman attacked Gilgit and appealed to its people for help. Bhup Sindh was attacked and all his troops except one were killed at Tuin, later known as Bhup Singh ka pari. Gauhar Aman then appointed his son in law, Muhammad Khan, as the ruler of Gilgit. However, Gilgit was retaken by a Dogra army under General Hushiara in 1858 AD, who in 1860 ordered a total massacre of the people of Yasin valley as a revenge of the earlier military defeats. In 1863, he collectively punished the population of Darel for not supporting his army against an invasion from Chitral. Several attempts were made in the following years by the tribal chiefs to liberate Gilgit but all failed due to a lack of modern military equipment and strategy. However these attacks did not let the British establish their rule firmly till 1888 AD. In 1889, the Gilgit agency was established and its powers extended over Gurais, Astor, Bunji, Sai and Gilgit. However Chitral, Punial, Hunza, Nagar, Darel, Gor and Chilas were made tributary to the Dogra court of Kashmir.

In Gilgit, Shias co-existed with Sunnis, Buddhists and Hindus. Northern part was reported to be predominantly Shia, while Sunni tenets were found in the Southern part of the region. The Gazetteer of Gilgit agency reads:

"Wherever Sunnis and Shias are found living together, they seem to practice a mutual tolerance rare in other Muhammadan communities. Except in Chilas and the Indus valley below or, there is, generally speaking, a complete absence of fanaticism".

==== Shi'ism in Kashmir ====
A very small minority of Shias lived in the suburbs of Srinagar, mainly at Zadibal. However, they were very hard-working and industrious people; finest papier-mache workers, shawl-makers and wealthiest were Shias. Of the famous 10 Shia Taraaj's, the last one occurred in September 1872. The Gazetteer of Kashmir contains the details of the violence:

"The disturbances then raged for more than a week, and for some time defied the efforts of the governor, who called in the aid of troops; whole districts were reduced to smoldering heaps of ruins; and business was for some time entirely suspended, a great portion of the city being deserted. The Shias fled in every direction, some seeking safety on the adjacent mountains, while others remained in the city in secret lurking places. Many of the women and children of the Shias found an asylum from the hands of their infuriated co-religionists in the houses of the Hindu portion of the community".

==== Shi'ism in NWFP and Tribal Agencies ====
After the British annexed Kohat, the Turis repeatedly attacked their troops in Miranzai. In 1854 AD an agreement was reached but the raids increased, and in 1856 AD, a force under Neville Chamberlain attacked the valley and the Turis were made to pay Rs. 8,630. In 1877 AD the Turis revolted against the oppressive attitude of the Afghan governor of Kurram. In November, 1878 AD, a British force commanded by General Roberts attacked Kurram from Thal, and occupied Kurram Fort. The Afghans were defeated at the Peiwar Kotal, and Khost was occupied in January next year. At that time, Afghanistan was being ruled by a fanatic Sunni king, Amir Abdur Rahman Khan. In 1880 AD, the Turis, with the Bangash, asked the British to take over the valley and protect them from Abdur Rahman Khan's fanaticism; but the British decided to keep them as a buffer between India and Afghanistan and the tribe was declared independent. The Shias of Kurram valley requested to join British India once more and the valley was finally annexed to British India in 1892.

Besides Turi and Bangash people of Kurram valley, many Orakzai Pashtuns in Tirah, and some in Kohat, Peshawar and Shirani country also professed Shi'ism. Fanaticism was rampant throughout the area. In Kurram, 22% of the population were Turis, 11% were Bangash and the rest were Chamkannis, Ghilzais, Mangals, Orakzais and a small Hindu minority of Arora caste. Main source of income was agriculture, however Silk was also produced and exported.

According to the British estimates, only 1% of the total population of the province professed to be Shia. In Peshawar, the Shias were only confined to the city, surrounded by fanatic opponents, and only 0.5% of the Muslim population professed to be Shia. Although the numbers may be under-estimated, as many Shias practice Taqiyah on individual level, especially while giving out their personal details. Muharram in Peshawar was observed with utmost respect. The small Shia community of Peshawar was mainly made of traders and migrants from Afghanistan, Iran, Kashmir and Punjab. In the late nineteenth century, some members of Qizilbash family provided financial support for arrangements of Muharram mourning.

==== Shi'ism in Punjab ====
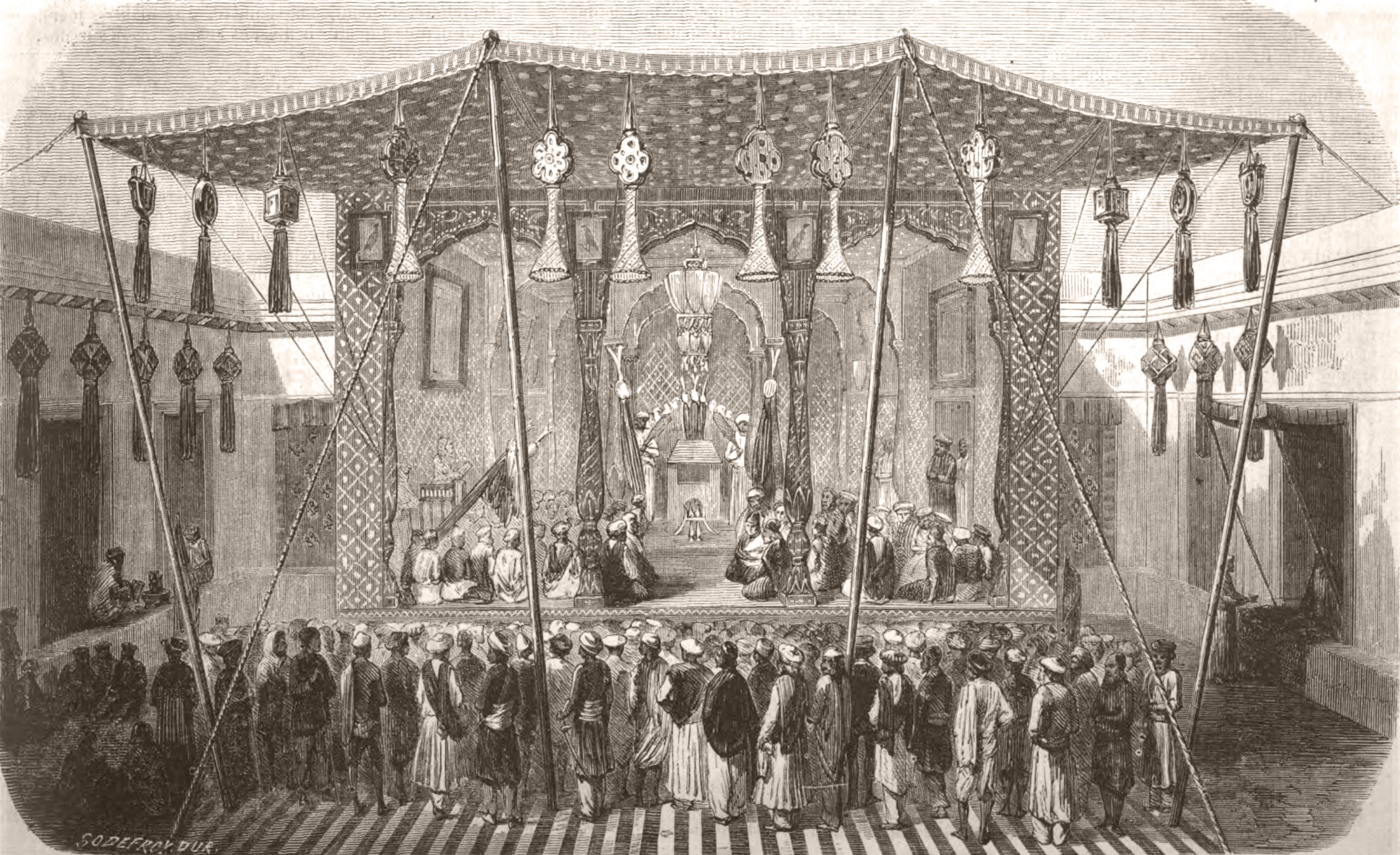
A painting illustrating Muharram observance of Lahore in 1857.

By the end of eighteenth century, Mulla Mehdi Khata'i, a disciple of Shaykh Hurr-al Amili's student Mullah Muhammad Muqim. His student, Syed Rajab Ali (1806–1866 AD) revived Shia scholarly tradition in Punjab in the nineteenth century. The emergence of Lucknow as an intellectual hub for Shi'ism in North India during the reign of the nawabs of Awadh played significant role in introduction of organised Shi'ism and Shia scholarship to Punjab. Clerics trained at the Asif-ud Daula seminary in Lucknow spread throughout North India to preach Usuli Shi'ism and connect people to the central religious authority at Lucknow. In the nineteenth century AD, Allama Abul Qasim Rizvi (1833 – 1906 AD) arrived in Lahore after having completed higher education in Iraq, and founded an Imamia seminary in 1879 patronized by Nawab Ali Raza Khan Qizilbash. Elites like the Qizilbashs in Lahore, Faqirs and Gardezis in Multan and Shah Jiwana and Rajoa Sa'dat in Jhang contributed heavily to the spread of Shi'ism in Punjab.

In Attock district, there were few Shia neighbourhoods, majority of them being Syeds. In Rawalpindi, the district Gazetteer of 1893 – 94 reports only some Gakhars openly registering themselves as Shias. In Shahpur district, the only 1.8% of the population said that they followed the Shia creed. In Lahore, they were a minority spread across the city.

The Gazetteer of Jhang District of 1883 – 1884 reads:-

"Shi'as are unusually numerous in Jhang, a fact due to the influence of the Shi'a Kuraishis of Shorkot and Hassu Balel, and the Sayads of Uch who are connected with the famous Sayad family of Belot in Dera Ismael Khan District and Shah Jiwana and Rajoa in the Jhang District. They are the most bigoted type. They observe the Muharram most strictly, abstaining from all luxuries for the first ten days of the month, and on the 10th they accompany the Taziahs bareheaded and bare-footed. They throw dust on their heads and beat their breasts with extreme violence, and allow neither Hindu nor Muhammadan to approach the Taziah without baring his head and removing his shoes".

The coexistence of Shias and Sunnis was noticed in other parts of Punjab as well. The following passage is taken from the 1923–24 Gazetteer of Multan:

"They are careful in the observance of the Muharram; and although Sunnis join freely in tazia procession, such observances are particularly unknown, except in the quarters where there are Shias to start and organize them. Generally speaking, there is very little bitterness between the Sunni and Shia sect, and in the ordinary intercourse of life, there is little to distinguish the two".

In the beginning of the twentieth century AD, Shia-Sunni debates were on the rise following sectarian riots in Lucknow. Allama Syed Muhammad Baqir Naqvi Chakralvi and other Shia scholars of Punjab held public debates with many Sunni scholars in the early years of the twentieth century. These debates during the British rule allowed Shias to present their case in the public without fear. The Multan District Gazetteer mentions this phenomenon:

"There is organized proselytizing, but every now and then a man is, by conversion or by loan of books, induced to change his sect, and there seems no doubt that the conversions from Sunnism to Shi'ism are more common than the vice versa".

Another factor was the wealth generated by the newly developed Canal irrigation system made it possible for the Shia elites of the area to spend lavishly on Muharram and build Imambargahs.

1960: Muharram Procession in Dera Ismail Khan.

The Jhang District Gazetteer of 1929 reads:-

"Shi'ism is on the increase in the district. The influx of wealth on account of canal irrigation has invested some Sayyid families with added importance, and has proved helpful in spreading Shi'ism".

The number of followers of Syed Ahmad Barelvi, known as Wahabis, had started to increase and thus the bitterness between Shias and Sunnis was also on the rise. The 1915 Gazetteer of Mianwali District recorded Shia phobia as follows:

"All the Pathan clans, excepting a small number of Shias Kazilbash Pathans in Bhakkar tahsil, are very strict Sunnis and very particular in the matter of prayers, fasts, etc. They have a great hatred of the Shias and Rafzis. An orthodox Pathan regards tazia with the greatest repugnance. The influence of Sunni governors too seems to have led to the very general profession of the Sunni faith by the bulk of the mixed Jat population, though the Biluches have as a rule adhered to the Shia faith".

==== Shi'ism in Sindh ====
Most of the Talpurs, the Mughals, Khojas, Bohras, a considerable population of Kalhoras, Syeds and Baluchis professed Shia faith. The Muharram mourning was observed throughout Sindh. The British Gazetteer of 1907 notes:

"Among Shias, who regard Yazid as a usurper and Hasan and Husain as martyrs, it is a season for deep and solemn, or even frenzied, grief. The Sunnis also consider it proper to mourn on the occasion, but in moderation. The mourning commences ten days before the anniversary and Taziahs, or Tabuts, that is models of the tomb of Husain at Karbala, are prepared in many houses, sometimes in very imposing and expensive styles. The Mirs, who are Shias and the Sayads of Rohri, Sukkur and Shikarpur are lavish in their expenditure on these. During the ten days of mourning the religious do not work, but dress in black and devote themselves to lamentation and prayer and listening to recites of the moving story. On the tenth day the tabuts are taken in procession to the sea, or a river or lake, and thrown into the water".

==== Khairpur Princely State ====
After the British conquest of Sindh in 1843, Khairpur remained as a self-governing princely state. After the partition of India it became a princely state of Pakistan and remained so till 1955, when it was merged into the One Unit of West Pakistan. The Talpur Mirs patronized the Muharram mourning and built Shia mosques and Imambaras. One of the Shia intellectuals of that era, Mirza Qilich Beg, is known as the pioneer of Sindhi drama and novels. Mir George Ali Murad Khan remains one of the few surviving first class rulers of the old Indian Empire, still holding a public Majlis every Muharram at his sprawling palace, Faiz Mahal.

==== Shi'ism in Balochistan ====
The annexation of Balochistan and formation of British garrison in 1876 coincided with the rule of Amir Abdur Rahman Khan, the Sunni king of Afghanistan, who attacked Hazarajat to annex the area, and his forces committed atrocities against the Shia Hazaras. Meanwhile, the 1888 – 1893 Hazara uprising had begun in Afghanistan, which was ruthlessly suppressed, about half of the Hazara population killed or expelled, their properties confiscated and women and children were sold as slaves. Many Hazaras fled to Quetta and started to live there. Some Shias from Punjab also settled there.

In Lasbela district, the trading community of Khojas were Shias, and lived in Miani niabat, Uthal, Ormara, and Shah Liari. They were majorly Ismailis, but a few Twelvers who observed mourning and made tazias or effigies of the Imams. The British Gazetteer noted that the Shias were despised by the Sunnis. In the district of Makran and Kharan, the Shias were known as Lotias, who were Khojas by ethnicity. They were found in Gwadar, Pasni, and Isai. They lived along the coastline and engaged in trade.

==== Shi'ism in Karachi ====
Karachi's cultural and social soul has been profoundly shaped by its numerous historic imambargahs, which serve as vital pillars of faith, resilience, and cultural preservation, especially during Muharram. These include the venerable Imambargah Siraj (circa 1775) in Lyari, the city's oldest; Ghareebul Ghurba Imambargah (1830) and Bishu Imambargah (1835) in Naya Abad; Imambargah Barah Imam (from 1836) in Bhim Pura; Barra Imambargah (1868) in Kharadar, renowned for its poetic rituals; and post-Partition establishments like Imambargah Hussainia Iranian (1948) and Mehfil-i-Shah-i-Khorasan (1948) in Soldier Bazaar, Qaimia Imambargah (1948) and Imambargah Darbar-i-Husaini (1954) in Malir; and later additions such as Imambargah Shah Wilayat (1960) in Golimar, Imambargah Jaffar-i-Tayyar (1960) in Malir, and Shah-i-Karbala Trust (Rizvia) Imambargah (1960) in Rizvia Society. These imambargahs collectively serve as crucial spiritual hubs, safeguard cultural traditions, and foster strong social cohesion for the city's diverse communities.

== Sectarian Violence ==
While Shias and Sunnis have lived side by side in the subcontinent for centuries, anti-Shia violence has been growing consistently for the past 300 years. Anti-Shi'ism has two aspects: shiaphobic literature and hate-crimes. The anti Shia literature that portrays Shias as religiously heretic, morally corrupt, politically traitors and lesser human beings sets the ideological framework for the violence against them.

=== Historical timeline ===
In the medieval period, the Middle East saw bloody clashes between both sects but the subcontinent remained safe and peaceful because of the secular policy of Mughals. Until the end of the sixteenth century AD, only two anti-Shia books were written in India: Minhaj al-Din by Makhdoom-ul Mulk Mullah Abdullah Sultanpuri and Radd-e Rawafiz by Shaikh Ahmad Sirhindi. Sirhindi argues:

"Since the Shia permit cursing Abu Bakr, Umar, Uthman and one of the chaste wives (of the Prophet), which in itself constitutes infedality, it is incumbent upon the Muslim ruler, nay upon all people, in compliance with the command of the Omniscient King (Allah), to kill them and to oppress them in order to elevate the true religion. It is permissible to destroy their buildings and to seize their property and belongings."

He has expressed his hate towards Shias in his letters too. According to him, the worst distorters of faith "are those who bear malice against the companions of Prophet Muhammad. God has called them Kafirs in the Quran". In a letter to Sheikh Farid, he said that showing respect to the distortors of faith (ahl-e-Bidʻah) amounted to destruction of Islam.

As far as armed violence is concerned, the medieval period has only few examples of Shias being killed for their beliefs, most notable incidents are the killing of Abdullah Shah Ghazi in 768 AD, the destruction of Multan in 1005 AD, the persecution of Shias at the hands of Sultan Feroz Shah (1351–1388 AD), and the target killing of Mullah Ahmad Thathavi in 1589 AD. However, the killer of Mulla Ahmad Thathavi was served justice by Emperor Akbar. The death of Syed Nurullah Shushtari seems to be politically motivated. The region of Srinagar in Kashmir is an exception in Middle Ages with ten bloody Taraaj-e Shia campaigns.

However, in the eighteenth century AD, the number of polemical writings started to increase. It started with Aurangzeb's discrimination against the Shias. The sixth Mughal emperor Aurangzeb Alamgir hated the Shias; he abolished the secular policy of Akbar and tried to establish the superiority of the Sunni sect. He supervised the compilation of an encyclopedia of religious rulings, called fatawa Alamgiri, in which Shias were said to be heretics. The spiritual leader of Bohra Shias, Sayyid Qutb-ud-din, along with his 700 followers were massacred on the orders of Aurangzeb. He banned the tazia processions. In the century following his death, polemical literature and sectarian killings increased.

==== Shia vs Sunni power struggle ====
Whenever a Mughal emperor died, war of succession followed in which elites played a key role. After Aurangzeb's death, when the Shia elites tried to play political role, the Sunni elite used the sectarian polarization created by Aurangzeb to undermine the Shia elite. This created a tug-of-war at the heart of Mughal Empire. Bengal and Awadh came under the rule of the Shia elite and the rest of the states, e.g. Deccan, Rohailkhand, Kashmir, etc., were ruled by Sunni elite. Shah Waliullah (1703 – 1762 AD) was among those Sunni clerics who were patronized by the Sunni elite. He started his career by translating the anti-Shia track of Shaikh Ahmad Sirhindi, radd-e-rawafiz, into Arabic under the title of al-muqaddima tus-suniyyah fil intisar lil-firqa te-sunniyah (المقدمة السنية في الانتصار للفرقة السنية). He continued to criticise the Shias in his books like Qurat-ul Ainain (قراۃ العینین), Azalah-tul Khafa (ازالۃ الخفا), Fayyuz-ul Haramain (فیوض الحرمین), etc. Other Sunni polemics include Najat al-Muminin (نجات المومنین) by Muhammad Mohsin Kashmiri, and Durr-ut Tahqiq (درالتحقیق) by Muhammad Fakhir Allahabadi. In a letter to Sunni nawabs, Shah Waliullah said:

"Strict orders should be issued in all Islamic towns forbidding religious ceremonies publicly practised by Hindus such as the performance of Holi and ritual bathing in the Ganges. On the tenth of Muharram, the Shias should not be allowed to go beyond the bounds of moderation, neither should they be rude nor repeat stupid things in the streets or bazars".

When on his and Rohilla's invitation, Ahmad Shah Abdali Durrani conquered Delhi, he expelled Shias. Shias of Kashmir were also massacred in an organised campaign after Afghans took power. In Multan, under the Durrani rule, Shia were not allowed to practise their religion. In 1762 - 1764 CE, the Afghan ruler of Kashmir Buland Khan Bamzai persecuted the Shias. Once the rumor spread that some Shias have passed negative remarks about a Sufi saint Habibullah Nowshehri. Furious Sunni mob attacked Zadibal neighborhood and torched the houses belonging to the Shias. Buland Khan ordered arrests of the Shias accused of blasphemy. They were terribly tortured and humiliated by cutting off their nose, limbs, ears, and heavy fines were imposed on them.

==== Shah Abd al-Aziz ====
Shah Waliullah's eldest son, Shah Abd al-Aziz (1746 – 1823 AD), hated Shias the most. Although he did not declare them apostates or non-Muslims, but he considered them lesser human beings just like what he would think about Hindus or other non-Muslims. In a letter he advises Sunnis to not greet Shias first, and if a Shia greets them first, their response should be cold. In his view, Sunnis should not marry Shias, avoid eating their food and the animals slaughtered by a Shia.

In 1770 AD, Rohilla ruler Najib-ud Daula died and Afghan control over power in Delhi weakened. Mughal Emperor Shah Alam returned to Delhi, adopted a secular policy and appointed a Shia general, Najaf Khan. Najaf Khan died in 1782, but his influence had helped Shias resettle in Delhi. This was not acceptable for Shah Abd al-Aziz and he termed it as a Shia conspiracy. To create fear among the majority and incite them, he wrote in Tuhfa Asna Ashariya:

"In the region where we live, the Isna Ashariyya faith has become so popular that one or two members of every family is a Shia".

This was a clear exaggeration. This tactic of presenting Shias as dangerous and spreading fear among Sunnis has been a common trait of all militant organisations targeting Shias. In complete contrast to this claim, in Malfuzat-i Shah Abd al-Aziz (ملفوظات شاہ عبد العزیز), he says that no Shia was left in Delhi after Ahmad Shah Abdali's expulsion, as predicted by his father Shah Waliullah. How could a community that was completely cleansed thirty years ago reach such high numbers in such a short period? The reality lies somewhat in between: expelled Shias had started to return and resettle in their homes, and continue Muharram processions which had upset him.

Shah Abd al-Aziz was also a flag-bearer of anti-science orthodoxy. Following the tradition of Imam Ghazali's Tahafat-ul-Filasafa, he declared that the eminent Shia scientist Allama Tafazzul Husain Khan was an apostate (mulhid-i-kamil).

He compiled most of the anti-Shia books available to him, albeit in his own language and after adding his own ideas, in a single book Tuhfa Asna Ashariya (تحفہ اثنا عشریہ). Shah Abd al-Aziz published his book in 1789 AD, using a pen name Hafiz Ghulam Haleem. This book appeared at a very important juncture in history of the Subcontinent. In the nineteenth century, publishing technology was introduced to India and publications became cheaper. This book was published on a large scale, financed by the Sunni elite. An Arabic translation of it as sent to the Middle East. The first Shia response came from Mirza Muhammad Kamil Dihlavi, titled Nuzha-tu Asna Ashariya (نزھۃ اثنا عشریۃ). Mirza was then invited by the Sunni governor of Jhajjar under the pretext of medical treatment and poisoned to death. The leading Shia theologian of the time, Ayatullah Syed Dildar Ali Naqvi wrote separate books for its main chapters. His disciples Mufti Muhammad Quli Musavi and Molana Syed Muhammad Naqvi also wrote rejoinders. However the book which gained widespread popularity in the scholarly circles was Abqaat-ul Anwar fi Imamat-i Aaima til Athaar (عبقات الانوار فی امامۃ الائمۃ الاطہار) by Ayatullah Mir Hamid Husain Musavi containing 18 volumes.

By the end of the 18th century, influence of the Wahhabi movement led by Muhammad ibn Abd al-Wahhab had started to touch Indian shores through Indian Hajj pilgrims and clerics visiting Hijaz.

In 1801 CE, Muharram procession in Srinagar was attacked by a Sunni mob after rumors spread that Shias were doing tabarra. The Pashtuns and extremists among the local Sunnis got together to attack the Shia neighborhood. They looted the belongings and raped the women. The British gazetteer of Kashmir notes:

"In the times of the Pathans, the Shias were not allowed to enact the feast of Moharem. In the time of Abdullah Khan, who made himself independent of his master at Kabul, they attempted to celebrate, but were attacked and plundered, and their houses burnt; some 150 of them (for there were very few in the city) were collected, their noses pierced, and one string passed through them all, and thus linked together, they were made to perambulate the bazars".

Shah Abd al-Aziz used to heavily criticise making of taziya and other arts associated with commemoration of Muharram, but he also authored a short treatise entitled Sirr al-Shahadatayn (سر الشہادتین), in which he described the commemoration of Muharram as God's will to keep the memory of Hussain's martyrdom alive. He also said that the martyrdom of Hasan and Hussain was, in spirit, the martyrdom of the Muhammad. He used to arrange public gatherings in Muharram himself. Rizvi said:

"In a letter dated 1822 CE he wrote about two assemblies which he used to hold in his own house and considered perfectly legal from the Shari'a point of view. One was held on the anniversary of Prophet Muhammad's demise and the other to commemorate the martyrdom of Imam Hasan and Imam Hussain on the tenth of Muharram or a day or two earlier. From four to five hundred and up to a thousand people gathered there. They recited durud. After the Shah's own arrival, the greatness of Imam Hasan and Imam Hussain, as related in the works of hadith, was described. The prophecies concerning their martyrdom, the circumstances that led to it and the wickedness of those who killed them were also recounted. The elegies on their martyrdom which Umm Salma and the companions of the Prophet had heard, were also described. Those dreadful visions, which Ibn Abbas and the Prophet's other companions saw relating to the Prophet's anguish at his grandson's tragic death, were also recited. The session concluded with the intoning of the Quran and fatiha over whatever food was available. Those who could recite a salam or an elegy melodiously did so. Those present, including Shah Abd al-Aziz, wept".

But it was also in the 19th century that exclusionary puritanical and fascist revivalist movements started to emerge among both Hindus and Muslims. Muharram was limited to Shias only.

==== First wave of anti-Shia militancy ====
On 21 April 1802, the puritanical followers of Muhammad ibn Abd al-Wahab had sacked the holy city of Karbala, killed more than 5000 Shias, and vandalized the holy shrines. In 1804, they had vandalized Prophet's Shrine in Medina and in 1805, Makkah, forcing people to adopt their creed. While this cruelty sent shock waves to the Muslims all around the globe, it encouraged Syed Ahmad Barelvi and Shah Ismail Dihlavi to take up arms and enforce their puritanical views. They were the pioneers of anti-Shia terrorism in the subcontinent. Barbara Metcalf says:

"A second group of abuses Syed Ahmad held were those that originated from Shi'i influence. He particularly urged Muslims to give up the keeping of ta'ziyahs. The replicas of the tombs of the martyrs of Karbala taken in procession during the mourning ceremony of Muharram. Muhammad Isma'il wrote,

a true believer should regard the breaking of a tazia by force to be as virtuous an action as destroying idols. If he cannot break them himself, let him order others to do so. If this even be out of his power, let him at least detest and abhor them with his whole heart and soul.

Sayyid Ahmad himself is said, no doubt with considerable exaggeration, to have torn down thousands of imambaras, the building that house the taziyahs".

These attacks were carried out between 1818 and 1820. Rizvi has given more details about time, places and circumstances in which these attacks were carried out. In response to these attacks, some shias started to recite tabarra. Maulana Syed Baqir Dihlavi, the editor and owner of Dihli Urdu Akhbar, stopped them from doing so.

Another puritanical movement was launched in Bengal between 1820 and 1840 by Haji Shari'atullah. The following statement is inscribed on his grave:

"The learned of all learned, the exponent of Divine law in eloquent and elegant tongue, the source of all guidance in the land of Hind and Bengal. Defender of religion against the menaces of the Shi'ahs and the disbelievers against all falsehood and vanity, deliverer if Islam (which) was covered by darkness like the sun enveloped in clouds. Whose words in truthfulness were like mountains in the open field".

In 1831 CE, a mob attacked the Shia neighborhood of Srinagar, Kashmir. Precious belongings were looted and women were raped. Some Sunni men even cut the private parts of their female victims with knives. The British gazetteer of Kashmir notes:

"in the time of the governor Bama Singh, the Shias attempted to celebrate the Moharem, but the enraged Sunnis fell upon them, killed fifteen of them, and plundered their property; and the Persian merchants, of whom there were two or three hundred, retreated from Kashmir and have never since resided there".

While Syed Ahmad's military adventure failed costing him his life in 1831, his ideological legacy continued in the Deoband school of thought. Data shows that around 90 percent of religious terrorists in Pakistan are Deobandis by faith and many of them belong to the Pashtun belt (the area where Syed Ahmad carried out his military endeavour).

His legacy of sectarian terrorism continued. The incidents of Wahhabist Sunnis attacking Azadari gatherings were not uncommon. One such event is reported in Delhi's Urdu Akhbar on 22 March 1840:

Some Sunnis had come to attack the gathering of Taziyah-dari in the bungalow of Mrs. Amir Bahu Begum, the widow of Shams al-Din Khan. However, the magistrate had learned of it the night before. He met with the local police officer and ordered him to appoint sufficient force and stop the agitators from reaching there. As a result of timely measures, it was reported that the event concluded peacefully.

Kanhaiya Lal in his book "Tarikh-i-Lahore", records an attack on Karbala Gamay Shah as follows:

"In 1849, this place Karbala Gamay Shah was demolished. On the 10th of Muharram that year, when Zuljanah came out, there was a fierce clash between the Shia and Sunni people near Shah Aalmi Gate. On that day, the buildings inside the enclosure were razed to the ground. The minarets of the shrines were also razed and the water well was mounded with bricks. Gamay Shah was thrashed until he fainted. Finally, the Deputy Commissioner Edward summoned a contingent of cavalry from Anarkali cantonment and the mob dispersed. Those who were arrested were punished".

==== Side effects of colonial rule ====
With the start of colonial rule in 1857, religious institutions and scholars lost most of the financial support they enjoyed previously. They now had to rely on public funding, the chanda. Secondly, when the British masters decided to introduce modern societal reforms, and everybody became ascribed to a singular identity in census and politically important in voting. Thus, politicization of religion and marking boundaries of the spheres of influence became a financial need of the religious leaders. They started to describe everybody belonging to their sect or religion as one monolithic group of people whose religion was in danger. The third important social change was the printing press which made writing and publishing pamphlets and books easy and cheap. The fourth factor was the railways and postal service; it became easy for communal leaders to travel, communicate and build networks beyond their place of residence. This changed the religious discourse drastically and gave birth to communal and sectarian violence. The puritanical wahhabists had already excluded Azadari from the Sunni Islam, and Arya Samaj and Shudhis started to ask Hindus to refrain from Azadari.

New sects emerging among Sunnis; e.g. Deobandis, Barelvis, Ahle Hadith, Ahmadis and the Quranists; took extreme positions against Shias in order to prove themselves pure and real spokesmen of Sunni Islam. Shias also started to modify the practice in order to popularize it. A new class of Urdu orators emerged, the khatibs, replacing Mujtahideen. A competition of holding the best majlis and attract participants made the Shia elite to introduce new practices and customs, like Zanjirzani, chup ka tazia, mehndi and Zuljinah. The Shia and Sunni orators started to challenge each other in religious debates and hence earn money as well as publicity, the most famous were Abdul Shakoor Lakhnavi (Sunni) and Maqbool Ahmad Dihlavi (ex-Sunni).

Meanwhile, the number the followers of Syed Ahmad Barelvi, who were commonly known as wahabis, was increasing. Their statistics given in the Gazetteer of the districts of Punjab is representative of the overall spread of the new sect.

The percentage of Wahabis in the Muslim Population of Punjab
Year	District	Wahabis
1897–98	Peshawar	0.01%
1883–84	Shahpur	0.07%
1883–84	Jhang	0.02%
1893–94	Lahore	0.03%

Although the numbers are not available for most of the districts, a tendency of increasing followers of Syed Ahmad Barelvi's puritanism can be confirmed. The numbers given in the Gazetteer's are also not exact, because many wahabis preferred to identify as mainstream sunnis. The Lahore Gazetteer notes:

"The wahabis are returned very short of their real number; probably many Muhammadans who were wahabis thought it safer not to reveal themselves as such".

In 1859, Maulvi Noor Ahmad Chishti wrote in his book "Yadgar-e-Chishti":

"Another splinter group has now emerged from within the Muslims and they are known as the Wahhabis. I see that many learned ones are attracted to them. I seek refuge in Allah! May God correct their beliefs."

The following paragraph from this book narrates attacks on Shia mourners in Muharram:

"and in every bazaar, people gather to pay tributes to the Zuljanah. Rose water is sprinkled on the horse from all sides but some people make fun of the mourners due to grudges. Some of these chant "Madad Char Yaar" which may sometimes result in violent clashes. So, when Major Karkar Bahadur was the Deputy Commissioner in Lahore, riots erupted between the Sunnis and Shias and many people got injured. Since then the Deputy commissioner of police, District police officer, Sub officer, some men of the company and one army officer accompany the horse to protect the Shias but still some try to cause trouble".

Polemical works were also being authored at a larger scale. Sir Syed Ahmed Khan started writing Tuhfa-e-Hasan (تحفہ حسن) against Shias but stopped after writing two volumes because he realized that it was doing harm. Nawab Mohsin-ul-Mulk wrote Ayyat-i-Bayenat (آیات بینات), Molana Rashid Ganguhi of Deoband wrote Hadiyah-tu-Shia (ہدیہ الشیعہ), Khalil Ahmad Saharanpori of Deoband wrote Mitraqah-tul-Karamah (مطرقہ الکرامه), Mirza Hairat Dihlavi of Deoband wrote Kitab-e-Shahdat (کتاب شہادت) in which he attacked Imam Ali and his sons for resisting against Umayyads.

==== The making of sectarian fascism ====
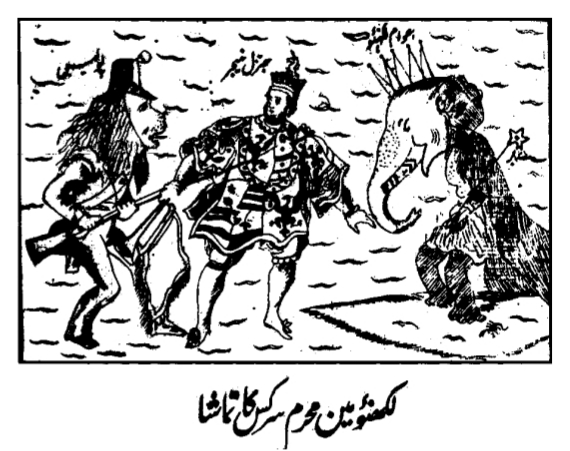
Cartoon appearing in Lucknow Punch, an Urdu satirical magazine mocking riots during Muharram 1908.

New technology, i.e. printing press and railways, along with political reforms brought major social changes and the institution of nation state started to take shape. Barbara Metcalf and Thomas Metcalf explain:

"The decades that spanned the turn of the twentieth century marked the apogee of the British imperial system, whose institutional framework had been set after 1857. At the same time, these decades were marked by a rich profusion and elaboration of voluntary organizations; a surge in publication of newspapers, pamphlets and posters; and the writing of fiction and poetry as well as political, philosophical, and historical non-fiction. With this activity, a new level of public life emerged, ranging from meetings and processions to politicized street theatre, riots, and terrorism. The vernacular languages, patronized by the government, took new shape as they were used for new purposes, and they became more sharply distinguished by the development of standardized norms. The new social solidarities forged by these activities, the institutional experience they provided, and the redefinitions of cultural values they embodied were all formative for the remainder of the colonial era, and beyond."

In Pune, there used to be more Hindus than Muslims participating in Muharram processions. In the 1890s, some communal Hindu leaders called for a boycott of what they thought was a Muslim festival. Colonial government facilitated them by refusing to issue licences to Hindus to erect the flags. Similarly in Satara, as a result of a campaign run from Pune, Muslims were left alone to observe Muharram. During the Ganpati festival, slogans against Muharram and Muslims were raised, and pamphlets were distributed urging Hindus to arm themselves. One Muslim was killed.

By the start of the 1900s, the majority of Sunnis still observed Muharram. Molana Abdul Shakoor Lakhnavi devised a clever plan to widen the gulf between the Shias and Sunnis. He started to advocate a celebration of victory of Imam Hussain over Yazid. He established a separate Sunni Imambargah at Phul Katora and asked Sunnis to wear red or yellow dress instead of black, and carry a decorated charyari flag instead of the traditional black alam-e-Abbas. Instead of honouring the Sahaba on their birthdays, he started to arrange public meetings under the banner of bazm-e-siddiqi, bazm-e-farooqi and bazm-e-usmani, in the first ten days of Muharram to revere the first three Caliphs and named it Madh-e-Sahaba. He would discuss the lives of the first three Caliphs and attack Shia beliefs. Shias saw it an attempt to sabotage the remembrance of the tragedy of Karbala and started to recite tabarra in response. These ideas resulted in Muharram becoming a feast as well as a battleground. As the government gazetteer noted:

Shops and booths came to be set up and there were amusements such as swings and merry go rounds. It appears further that women of the town had begun not only to frequent the route of the tazias but to set up tents on the fairground where they received visitors.

According to Dhulipala;

The Shias took exception to these practices which they felt denigrated the solemnity of these religious occasions which were predominantly for mourning. They therefore petitioned the Lucknow District Magistrate to check these practices and to disallow anything which went against the character of these occasions. In response, stringent rules sympathetic to Shia demands were put into place for the Ashra procession of 1906 by the Lucknow District administration. The Sunnis objected to the new rules claiming that unlike the Shias, they regarded the processions as celebrations in honour of an Islamic hero and not as occasions for mourning. The dispute between the two sides was temporarily settled in 1906 with the Lucknow district administration granting a separate site for Sunnis to bury their Karbala.

The Sunnis, however, were now determined to give their processions a character that was distinct to that of the Shia processions. Verses at the time known as Charyari were recited during the Sunni processions. These verses were in praise of the first four Caliphs who were portrayed as friends of the Prophet as well as friends of each other. Since some of these verses 'were positively objectionable in that they contained abuse of Shias and of their beliefs', their recitation was found provocative by the Shias. The Shias retaliated by reciting Tabarra or abuse of the first three Caliphs in their own processions, since they saw them as usurpers who were hostile to the rightful Caliph Ali and his family. These developments marked a watershed in the social relations between these two sects of Islam in the UP. Serious riots broke out in 1907 and 1908 in Lucknow due to the recitation of Charyari and Tabarra by Sunni and Shia processions respectively.

Responding to these developments, in 1908, the provincial government set up a committee headed by T.C. Piggott, an ICS officer, who was asked to examine the whole issue, assess the claims of both parties, and to make recommendations. The Piggott committee concluded that the recitation of Charyari verses in an organised way, and converting Tazia processions into Charyari processions, was an 'innovation' since 1906. Such social innovations were deemed to be at the root of civil disturbances in a combustible religious society like India, and the British, in their keenness to maintain law and order, actively discouraged them. Not surprisingly, the Piggott committee recommended prohibiting the recitation of Charyari verses along the 'route of any tazia, alam or other Mohammadan procession or in the hearing of such a procession' on three days of the year – Ashra, Chhelum and the 21st day of Ramzan.

With increasing incidents of violence and having lost political influence in Awadh and Bengal, Shias started to practice Taqiyya on individual level. Hollister says:-

"For some decades the decennial census made a separate enumeration of Shias and Sunnis in some of the Provinces. In 1911 and 1921, most Provinces and states were included but the results were unsatisfactory. For example, in 1921, in the census for Bihar and Orissa, 3711 Shias were enumerated, but in the report of superintendent of Census Operations in the Province, we read that:

'It is certain that these figures are not nearly complete, and the reason is that many Shias refused to record themselves as such'.

That they would refuse to do so was clearly stated the day before the census was taken, by a Shiite member in the Legislative Council at Patna. An estimate made at that times placed the probable figure at 17,000, or nearly five times the census enumeration. For Patna city, the estimate was for 10,000 against a census figure of 1000. In 1931 and 1941, the effort to make a separate enumeration of Shias was generally discontinued".

During the 1929 revolt against Afghan king Amanullah, Shia villages were attacked in Tirah valley in the tribal areas bordering Afghanistan. Ghani Khan reports:

"Heaven and houris were promised to those who killed the Shias. The Afridi's listened. The gold offered and the houris promised proved too much for them. They picked up their rifles and went in search of Heaven. Then followed a most frightful destruction not only of the Shias but of cattle and trees as well. Valleys where the Shias lived were laid desolate – millions of fruit trees, hundreds of years old Chinar and almond plantations were sawn down. The Shias were too broken and distracted to come to Amanullah's help".

After the failure of the Khilafat movement in the 1920s, the political ulema had lost their support in public and Muslims started to follow modern minds like Muhammad Ali Jinnah. To keep themselves relevant, the ulema established a militant Deobandi organisation, Majlis Ahrar-e-Islam, in 1931. They came from neighboring Malihabad, Kanpur, Delhi, Meerut and from as far as Peshawar. This organisation can be considered as predecessor of Sipah-e-Sahaba Pakistan (SSP). They first agitated against the Ahmedis in Kashmir and now they were looking for an opportunity. It was provided by Molana Abdul shakoor Lakhnavi who now added Farooqi to his name and had become a follower of Deobandi sect and he had established a seminary in Lucknow in 1931 right on the route of Azadari, called Dar-ul-Muballighin. Molana Abdul Shakoor Farooqi wrote many books and pamphlets. Shias responded by writing rejoinders. As paper had become available in plenty, these writings spread all over subcontinent and caused incidents of violence, though negligible compared to what was happening in UP. Dhulipala says:

The problem broke out with renewed vigour in 1936 on Ashra day when two Sunnis disobeyed orders and publicly recited Charyari in the city centre of Lucknow. They were arrested and prosecuted, but then on Chhelum day more Sunnis took part in reciting Charyari and fourteen were arrested. This led to a new agitation by the Lucknow Sunnis in favour of reciting these verses publicly, which came to be known as Madhe Sahaba.

The government appointed the Allsop committee which endorsed the decision of the Piggott committee and imposed ban on Madhe Sahaba on the days of Azadari. Jinnah had stopped members of Muslim League from taking sides in the conflict which he termed as a conspiracy to distract Muslims from their real concerns. Liaquat Ali Khan delivered a speech on the floor of UP assembly supporting Madh-e-Sahaba agitation in Muharram. The Allsop committee report was published in March 1938 and was rejected by the Deobandi ulema. Dhulipala narrates:

Zafarul Mulk declared that he had sent a notice to the government that the Sunnis would launch civil disobedience in case it did not reconsider its decision. The next day on Chhelum, there was an incident at Patanala, a narrow lane in Lucknow, housing the Dar al Muballaghin, a Sunni religious institution run by Maulana Abdul Shakur. Brickbats were thrown at a Shia Tazia procession passing in front of the institution and the consequent riot saw ten people being killed and several dozen injured.

This was peak of Madhe Sahaba Agitation. Killings of Shias had begun. Molana Hussain Ahmed Madani, the Congress-paid cleric who had so far disguised himself in a secular outlook by opposing the two-nation theory, removed the hypocritical mask. Mushirul Hasan describes his role in anti-Shia violence as:

"All hell broke loose. Husain Ahmad Madani (1879–1957), principal of the renowned seminary at Deoband along with other Jam'iyat al-'Ulama' leaders, jumped into the fray. He advocated civil disobedience. Thousands paid heed to his call and courted arrest. Though a fervent advocate of secular nationalism and a principled critic of the «two-nation theory», he stirred sectarian passions unabashedly. He spoke at a public meeting in Lucknow on 17 March 1938 sharing the platform with the firebrand head of the Dar al-Muballighin, Maulvi 'Abdul Shakoor, and Maulana Zafarul Mulk, chief exponent of Madh-e Sahaba in Lucknow".

==== From stone pelting to bomb blasts ====
Azadari in UP was no more peaceful; it would never be the same again. Violence went so far that on Ashura 1940, a Deobandi terrorist attacked the Ashura procession with a bomb. Hollister writes:

"Conflicts between Sunnis and Shias at Muharram are not infrequent. Processions in the cities are accompanied by police along fixed lines of march. The following quotations from a single newspaper are not usual. They indicate what might happen if government did not keep the situation under control: 'adequate measures avert incidents', 'Muharram passed off peacefully', 'All shops remained closed in . . . in order to avoid incidents', 'Several women offered satyagraha in front of the final procession . . . about twenty miles from Allahabad. They object to the passing of the procession through their fields', 'the police took great precautions to prevent a breach of the peace', 'as a sequel to the cane charge by the police on a Mehndi procession the Moslems . . . did not celebrate the Muharram today. No ta'zia processions were taken out . . . Business was transacted as usual in the Hindu localities', 'Bomb thrown on procession'. Not all of these disturbances spring from sectarian differences, but those differences actuate many fracases. Birdwood says that, in Bombay, where the first four days of Muharram are likely to be devoted to visiting each other's tabut khanas, women and children as well as men are admitted, and members of other communities – only the Sunnies are denied 'simply as a police precaution'".

The main purpose of the army of Sahaba had been achieved: Shias and Sunnis were segregated as Azadari was not safe any more.

Congress wanted to use the sectarian card against Jinnah, who was a Shia, but the more Congress supported the religio-fascists ulema, the more it alienated her from the Muslims and the more the League became popular. The sectarian activities started to fire back. Deobandi ulema were becoming infamous and Muslim masses were disgusted with what the Muslim league interpreted as 'divide-and-rule' policy of Congress. With the Pakistan movement gaining momentum, Muslims put their differences aside and started to respond to the Muslim League's call of Muslim Unity and establishment of a separate homeland. Now Deobandi ulema changed tactics: in 1944 they established a separate organisation to do the dirty work, Tanzim-e-Ahle-Sunnat, solely focused on the anti-Shia violence and the main leaders like Madani started to present themselves as inclusive secularists again. The irony is that the same nationalistic secular ulema were writing fake history about Akbar being the cursed infidel and Shaikh Ahmad Sirhindi being a notable opposition to his secularism. Archives and history books of Mughal period have much material about opposition leaders, e.g. Shiva Ji, but there is no mention of Ahmad Sirhindi. It was Molana Azad who first crafted a hero out of Ahmad Sirhindi and later this fabrication was carried on by all Deobandi historians. Some others, like Shabbir Ahmad Usmani, joined the League and when failed to snatch leadership from Jinnah, formed a new party in 1946, Jamiat Ulema-i-Islam (JUI) which would become the first opposition party after the foundation of Pakistan.

=== Shiaphobia in modern Subcontinent ===
After the demise of Jinnah, the feudal prime minister of Pakistan, Nawabzada Liaquat Ali Khan, allied with Deobandi ulema and passed the Objectives Resolution and adopted the puritanical Wahhabism as state religion. This move against the Non-Muslim citizen was supported by Shias and Ahmadis too. Jinnah's appointed law minister, Jogendra Nath Mandal, resigned from his post. Shias of Pakistan allege discrimination by the Pakistani government since 1948, claiming that Sunnis are given preference in business, official positions and administration of justice. Although the sectarian hateful literature had been pouring into Punjab since Shah Abd al-Aziz wrote his Tuhfa Asna Ashariya, however, major incidents of anti-Shia violence began only after mass migration in 1947. Many students of Molana Abdul Shakoor Farooqi and Molana Hussain Ahmad Madani migrated to Pakistan and either set up seminaries here or became part of the Tanzim-e-Ahle-Sunnat (TAS) or Jamiat Ulema-i-Islam (JUI). They travelled through the length and breadth of the country and called for attacks on Azadari and wrote books and tracts against it. Among them were: Molana Noorul Hasan Bukhari, Molana Dost Muhammad Qureshi, Molana Abdus Sattar Taunsavi, Molana Mufti Mahmood, Molana Abdul Haq Haqqani, Molana Sarfaraz Khan Safdar Gakharvi, and Molana Manzoor Ahmad Naumani.

==== First decade post-independence ====
In the 1950s, Tanzim-e-Ahle-Sunnat started to arrange public gatherings all over Pakistan to incite violence and mock Shia sanctities. TAS issued an anti-Shia monthly, called Da'wat. In Muharram 1955, attacks took place on at least 25 places in Punjab. In 1956, thousands of armed villagers gathered to attack Azadari in the small town of Shahr Sultan, but were stopped by Police from killing. On 7 August 1957, three Shias were killed during an attack in Sitpur village. Blaming the victim, TAS demanded that government should ban the thousand years old tradition of Azadari, because it caused rioting and bloodshed. In May 1958, a Shia orator Agha Mohsin was target-killed in Bhakkar. Police needed to be appointed to many places, the scenario became more like in the pre-partition Urdu Speaking areas. The Shia ulema were becoming part of religious alliances and not supporting secularism. The syllabus taught at Shia seminaries does not include any course on the history of the subcontinent. Shia clerics don't have an independent political vision: they were strengthening the puritanism which was going to deprive Shias of basic human rights, like equality, peace and freedom.

==== Under Ayub Khan and Bhutto ====
Ayyub Khan enforced Martial Law in 1958. In the 1960s, Shias started to face state persecution when Azadari processions were banned at some places and the ban was lifted only after protests. In Lahore, the main procession of Mochi gate was forced to change its route. After Martial Law was lifted in 1962, anti-Shia hate propaganda started again, both in the form of books and weekly papers. The Deobandi organisation Tanzim-e-Ahle-Sunnat demanded the Azadari to be limited to Shia ghetto's. Following Muharram, on 3 June 1963, two Shias were killed and over a hundred injured in an attack on Ashura procession in Lahore. In a small town of Tehri in the Khairpur District of Sindh, 120 Shias were slaughtered. The press did not cover the incidents properly, as the identity of both the perpetrators and the victims, and their objective was concealed. On 16 June, six Deobandi organisations arranged a public meeting in Lahore where they blamed the victims for the violence. In July, a commission was appointed to inquire into the riots. Its report was published in December that year, but it too did not name any individual or organisation. Nobody was punished. Mahmood Ahmad Abbasi, Abu Yazid Butt, Qamar-ud-Din Sialvi and others wrote books against Shias.

In 1969, Ashura procession was attacked in Jhang. On 26 February 1972, Ashura procession was stone pelted on in Dera Ghazi Khan. In May 1973, the Shia neighbourhood of Gobindgarh in Sheikhupura district was attacked by Deobandi mob. There were troubles in Parachinar and Gilgit too. In 1974, Shia villages were attacked in Gilgit by armed Deobandi men. January 1975 saw several attacks on Shia processions in Karachi, Lahore, Chakwal and Gilgit. In a village Babu Sabu near Lahore, three Shias were killed and many were left injured.

On the other hand, Mufti Mahmood, Molana Samiul Haq, Ihsan Illahi Zaheer and others wrote and spoke furiously against Shias. Molana Samilul Haq wrote in the editorial of Al-Haq magazine:

"We must also remember that Shias consider it their religious duty to harm and eliminate the Ahle-Sunna .... the Shias have always conspired to convert Pakistan to a Shia state ... They have been conspiring with our foreign enemies and with the Jews. It was through such conspiracies that the Shias masterminded the separation of East Pakistan and thus satiated their thirst for the blood of the Sunnis".

The liberation struggle of Bangladesh was instigated by economic and cultural grievances, not religion. The religious reality is that the Shia population of Bangladesh was less than 1%, and similarly the Mukti Bahni was pre-dominantly Sunni. The members of Al-Badr and Al-Shams, the jihadi militias set up by Pakistan armed forces to crush the Bengali fighters, were recruited from Jamaat-i-Islami and followed wahhabist form of Islam preached by followers of Syed Ahmad Barelvi and Shah Ismael Dihlavi. Shias of Pakistan form a small minority in civil and military services and they too try to downplay their religious identity for fears of discrimination.

==== Zia's Islamization and Afghan Jihad ====
After Zia's takeover in 1977, the influence of socialism and modernism started to wane and religious parties felt empowered by Zia's islamization program. They began to recruit workers and volunteers. In February 1978, Ali Basti, a Shia neighborhood in Karachi, was attacked by a Deobandi mob and 5 men were killed. Next Muharram, in 1978, Azadari processions were attacked in Lahore and Karachi leaving 22 Shias dead. After Soviet Union invaded Afghanistan in 1979, the country became a safe haven for Shia phobic militants. They could now train in the name of Afghan Jihad, kill Shias and go to Afghanistan in hiding. The number of hate crimes against the Shias increased. During Muharram 1980, the Afghan Refugees settled near Parachinar attack Shia villages and in 1981, they expelled Shias from Sada. At that time, Kurram Militia was employed in Kurram Agency, they successfully contained this violence. In 1983, Shias neighbourhoods of Karachi were attacked on Eid Milad-un-Nabi. 94 houses were set on fire, 10 Shias were killed. On Muharram 1983, there were again attacks on Shias in Karachi. On 6 July 1985, police opened fire on a Shia demonstration in Quetta, killing 17 Shias. Shias responded and 11 attackers were killed. According to police report, among the 11 attackers who died in the clash only 2 were identified as police sepoys and 9 were civilian Deobandis wearing fake police uniforms. In Muharram 1986, 7 Shias were killed in Punjab, 4 in Lahore, 3 in Layyah. In July 1987, Shias of Parachinar were attacked by the Afghan Mujahideen again, who were ready to defend and as a result, 52 Shias and 120 attackers died. In 1988, Shia procession was banned in Dera Ismail Khan and 9 unarmed Shia civilians were shot dead while defying the ban. The government had to restore the procession. In the 1988 Gilgit Massacre, Osama bin Laden-led Sunni tribals assaulted, massacred and raped Shia civilians in Gilgit after being inducted by the Pakistan Army to quell a Shia uprising in Gilgit.

It was not Zia, but Liaquat Ali Khan who had patronised the perpetrators of Lucknow sectarianism and started the process of Islamization. Ayyub Khan not only alienated Bengalis but also promoted a historical narrative of Ghulam Ahmad Pervaiz, a conspiracy theorist who attacked Shias in his books like Shahkaar-e-Risalat. Long before Zia, the two-nation theory of Jinnah had been attributed to Ahmad Sirhindi and Shah Waliullah. These hate preachers were presented as heroes and real founders of Pakistan in Syllabus.

Other significant event was the Islamic revolution of Iran. It indirectly strengthened the Islamists in Pakistan. Molana Maududi's Jamaat-e-Islami shared common ideas of political Islamism. They were the first to support it and publish Khomeini's writings and speeches in Pakistan. Shias did not support this revolution until 1985, when Molana Arif al-Hussaini assumed leadership of the Shia organisation Tehreek-e-Jafariya. Molana Manzoor Ahmad Naumani had been writing against Jamaat-e-Islami for long time. Fearing that this revolution might actually empower Jamaat-i-Islami and the Shias, he obtained funding from Rabta Aalam-i-Islami of Saudi Arabia and wrote a book against Shias and Khomeini. Meanwhile, Molana Nurul Hasan Bukhari and Attaullah Shah Bukhari had died and Taznim-e-Ahle-Sunnat (TAS) was in a bad shape. The need for its re-organization was met by another Deobandi cleric of lower rank, Molana Haq Nawaz Jhangvi from Punjab. With same ideology and support base, he chose the name Anjuman Sipah-e-Sahaba (ASS) and later changed it to Sipah-e-Sahaba Pakistan (SSP).

==== The search for strategic depth ====
Just as the Soviet forces were leaving Afghanistan, a wave of civil disobedience and protests erupted in Kashmir. Pakistan decided to send in the Jihadis trained for Afghan Jihad. The followers of Syed Ahmad Barelvi's puritanical form of Islam were trained at Balakot, the place where he was killed while fleeing the joint Sikh-Pashtun attack in 1831. New organisations, like Hizbul Mujahideen, were set up, but their members were drawn from the ideological spheres of Deobandi seminaries and Jamaat-e-islami. This made matters worse for Shias in Pakistan, as the jihadis trained for Kashmir used to come home and act as part-time sectarian terrorists. The state initially turned a blind eye. Sipah-e-Sahaba became more lethal, and the incidents of Shia killing became more organised and more targeted. Shia intellecticide began in the 1990s: doctors, engineers, professors, businessmen, clerics, lawyers, civil servants and other men of learning were being listed and murdered. Mainstream media, either under fear of jihadists or out of ideological orientation of majority of journalists, chose to hide the identity of Shia victims and create false binaries which made it difficult for the people to understand the gravity of the situation and researchers and human rights activists to gather the correct data and form a realistic narrative. Another tactic deployed for this strategy of confusion was to change the names of sectarian outfits: in the 1980s Tanzim-e-Ahlesunnat (TAS) had come to be known as Sipahe Sahaba (SSP), in the 1990s a new umbrella was set up under the name of Lashkar-e-Jhangvi (LeJ), whose members, if caught red-handed, were supported by SSP's lawyers and funding.

==== Post-9/11 scenario ====
In 2001, after the September 11 attacks on twin towers in the United States, Pakistan decided to join America in her war against terrorism. President Musharraf banned Lashkar-e-Jhangvi and Sipah-e-Muhammad. In October 2001, Mufti Nizam al-Din Shamzai, a renowned Deobandi religious authority, issued a fatwa calling for Jihad against the US and Pakistani States.

It has been quoted by the terrorists groups as religious justification of their acts of violence, such as targeting government offices and spreading chaos through suicide bombings. The prime targets of these attacks have been the Shia Muslims.

Faith-based violence against Shias in post 9/11 Pakistan
Year	Bomb Blasts	Firing Incidents	Urban	Rural	Killed	Injured
2001	0	7	6	1	31	6
2002	0	6	6	0	29	47
2003	1	4	5	0	83	68
2004	5	4	9	0	130	250
2005	4	2	2	4	91	122
2006	2	3	2	3	116	unknown
2007	2	11	4	9	442	423
2008	6	10	7	9	416	453
2009	8	27	19	16	381	593
2010	7	16	16	7	322	639
2011	2	33	26	9	203	156
2012	11	310	247	74	630	616
2013	20	283	269	34	1222	2256
2014	7	262	251	18	361	275
2015	11	99	100	10	369	400
2016	2	54	49	7	65	207
2017	4	34	26	12	308	133
2018	1	28	24	5	58	50
2019	2+	15+	16+	1+	38+	9+

The incidents of violence in cities occur more often than in rural areas. This is because the urban middle class is easy to radicalise, especially the people migrating from rural areas seek refuge in religious organisations to fight the urban culture and to look for new friends of similar rural mindset. Increasing urbanisation was one of the root causes of the violence in Lucknow in the 1930s. Justin Jones says:

"one of the greatest contributing social factors to Shi'a-Sunni conflict throughout the 1930s was the massive shift of population and demography taking place in Lucknow. Before the 1920s, colonial Lucknow had been slow to modernise and remained largely stagnant both in terms of economic and population growth. However, Lucknow's quick development thereafter into a major provincial centre of industry and trade saw the city's population spiral after 1921 from some 217,000 to 387,000 in just twenty years".

=== Conceptualizing anti-Shia violence in Pakistan ===
To make sense of the continuous, systematic and multi-dimensional persecution of the Shias of Pakistan, Abbas Zaidi has applied model of genocide to the phenomena, what he terms as a slow-genocide, a term used by Nobel Laureates Professor Amartya Sen and Desmond Tutu for describing the plight of the Rohingya. In 1996, Gregory Stanton, the president of Genocide Watch, presented a briefing paper called "The 8 Stages of Genocide" at the United States Department of State. In it he suggested that genocide develops in eight stages that are "predictable but not inexorable".

The political Islamist movements in Pakistan have always had an intent to destroy, in whole or in part, the Shia community which they termed as a Jewish conspiracy against Islam, that is morally corrupt and dangerous for the Sunni majority. The South Asian ideologue of anti-Shi'ism, Shah Abd al-Aziz, presents a conspiracy theory to explain the origins of Shi'ism, in which the conquered Jews, led by a Sherlock Holmes type character, Abdullah ibn Saba, planned to take revenge from Islam and joined the ranks of Ali as his partisans. He intentionally ignores the emergence of the Shia-Sunni split right after the death of the Prophet, over the question of Caliphate. He also doesn't point towards the activism of Abu Dhar al-Ghifari, which was the first major protest movement against the Umayyad domination. The sayings of Muhammad mentioning the term "Shias of Ali", and the presence of a group of the companions of Prophet known for their reverence to Ali were also excluded from his painting of Shia history. This deviation from the real origins of Shia Islam and the anti-semitic, ahistorical narrative has been an ideological basis for the crimes of genocidal nature against Shias. He also advises Sunnis to humiliate the Shias. His book targeting Shia history and beliefs, Tauhfa Ithna Ashari, is widely taught in Sunni seminaries of modern South Asia.

Like all genocidal narratives, Shias are presented as traitors and morally corrupt. Most of the negative Muslim characters of South Asian history are painted as Shias. Mushirul Hasan notes:

"There was in addition, a concerted move to discourage Shia-Sunni marriages, portray Shias as sexually promiscuous, describe them as heretics and depict them as traitors to the country and as enemies of Islam. Frequently cited examples were Mir Sadiq, diwan of Tipu Sultan; Mir Alam, divan of Hyderabad; Mir Jafar, diwan of Siraj ud-Daula, or the Bilgrami family. They were chided for being in league with British or Indian governments against their Sunni overlords".

While Mir Sadiq and Mir Alam belonged to the Sunni sect of their respective rulers, Mir Jafar was actually a Shia but so was Siraj-ul Daula, whom he deserted for political benefits. Shia personalities of the past who are perceived as heroes, like Jinnah in Pakistan and Siraj-ul Daula, are painted as Sunnis.

In Urdu literature, many famous Sunni novelists and drama writers depict Shias as sex workers, hypocrites and criminals. One such example is the famous Inspector Jamshaid Series of crime novels by Ishtiaq Ahmad. In novels of Bano Qudsia, lady sex worker have Shia names and alam-i Abbas erected on their place of work house, which is actually a Shia symbol erected on Imambargahs.

This anti-Shia narrative of popular history and literature has implications: In 2007, Tahir Ashrafi, an advisor of the Punjab government, visited the detained members of the banned Lashkar-i Jhangvi. He says:

"some of them showed me religious decrees issued in the printed form that said: women of Shias and Qadiyanis are your slaves, their properties are halal and their killing is a religious necessity".

One pamphlet circulated by Lashkar-e-Jhangvi in Pakistan's province of Balouchistan reads:

"All Shia are worthy of killing. We will rid Pakistan of unclean people. Pakistan means "land of the pure" and the Shia have no right to live in this country. We have the edict and signatures of revered scholars, declaring the Shia infidels. Just as our fighters have waged a successful jihad against the Shia Hazara in Afghanistan, our mission in Pakistan is the abolition of this impure sect and its followers from every city, every village, and every nook and corner of Pakistan. As in the past, our successful jihad against the Hazara in Pakistan and, in particular, in Quetta is ongoing and will continue in the future. We will make Pakistan the graveyard of the Shia Hazara and their houses will be destroyed by bombs and suicide-bombers. We will only rest when we will be able to fly the flag of true Islam on this land of the pure. Jihad against the Shia Hazara has now become our duty."

The killers of Shias are well organised. The organisations targeting the Shia community in Pakistan have functional units in all major cities and towns, where they spread hate against Shias; and train and motivate their members to carry out assassinations and suicide bombings. Shia civilians in the country are regularly killed on a daily basis by the takfiri Deobandi terrorist organisations such as Sipah-e-Sahaba Pakistan, Lashkar-e-Jhangvi, Jaish-e-Mohammed, Tehrik-i-Taliban Pakistan, Harkat-ul-Jihad al-Islami, Lashkar-e-Taiba and others. The Pakistani governments turn a blind eye.

Abbas Zaidi in his detailed study of media coverage of the crimes against Shias of Pakistan, argues that both the state and the private media houses have adopted a policy of justification and denial. He says:

"the media reports Shia killing in one of three ways: denial, obfuscation, and justification. By denial I mean that the media explicitly or implicitly claims that not Shias but "people", "men", "pilgrims", or ethnic "Hazaras" are being killed. This happens when the media either does not report Shia killing at all or deliberately hides Shia victims' sectarian identity. By obfuscation I mean that the media portrays Shia killing in terms of a Shia–Sunni binary in which both sects are shown to be equally involved in violence. By justification I mean that the media portrays the Shias as heretics, blasphemers, and agents provocateurs operating on behalf of foreign powers and thus deserving of violence being done to them".

Khaled Ahmed argues that it is because the owners of the media houses and the manpower employed there is overwhelmingly Sunni, and that there is a 'sense of shame' that stops them from openly talking about the problem.

== Shi'ism in Pakistan ==
Although the overwhelming majority of Pakistani Shia Muslims belong to Ithna 'ashariyah school, there are significant minorities of Nizari Ismailis, (Aga Khanis) and the smaller Mustaali Dawoodi Bohra and Sulaimani Bohra branches. The distribution of Shia population is uneven. They are a local majority only in Gilgit-Baltistan and Kurram. In Punjab and Sindh, most Shias live in small towns and villages.

=== Notable Shias of Pakistan ===
Muhammad Ali Jinnah, the Quaid-e-Azam ("the Great Leader"), the founder of Pakistan, was born into a Shia family. Some claim that he practiced the Sunni school of thought later in life, however, after his death, his sister Fatima Jinnah asked the court to execute Jinnah's will under Shia Islamic law. Liaquat Ali Khan and Fatima Jinnah both asserted in a joint affidavit that Jinnah was Shia. However, Jinnah's grandnephew, Liaquat H. Merchant, writes that "the Quaid was not a Shia; he was also not a Sunni, he was simply a Muslim."

While in past few decades, to address the legal needs and political support of the Shi'a population in Pakistan, organisations like Tehrik-e-Jafaria Pakistan and Imamia Students Organisation were formed, while Sipah-e-Muhammad Pakistan, a Shia militant group, was formed to deter the militancy against Shias by Sipah-e-Sahaba Pakistan as well as Lashkar-e-Jhangvi, Deobandi militant groups. Although the Sunni and Shia Muslims usually coexist peacefully, sectarian violence is carried out sporadically by radical groups.

When General Zia ul-Haq, the former military ruler of Pakistan, introduced new laws to make Zakat deductions mandatory for every Muslim during the 1980s, Tehrik-e-Jafaria held a large public demonstration in Islamabad to compel the government to exempt the Shia Muslim community from this law. This protest resulted in the "Islamabad Agreement" in which the government agreed to introduce a separate syllabus for Shia students in public schools, as well as exempt the Shia community from the Zakat law, since Shia consider Zakat as a personal tax (to be paid to the needy) not collectible by the state. According to one senior Pakistani journalist who witnessed these events, Iranian leader Ayatollah Khomeini played an important role in this agreement being reached, and he sought assurances from General Zia al-Haq that Shia demands would be met. A message from Ayatollah Khomeini was also read out to the Shia protesters in Islamabad in which he called for them to keep up their spirits.

== Shi'ism in modern India ==
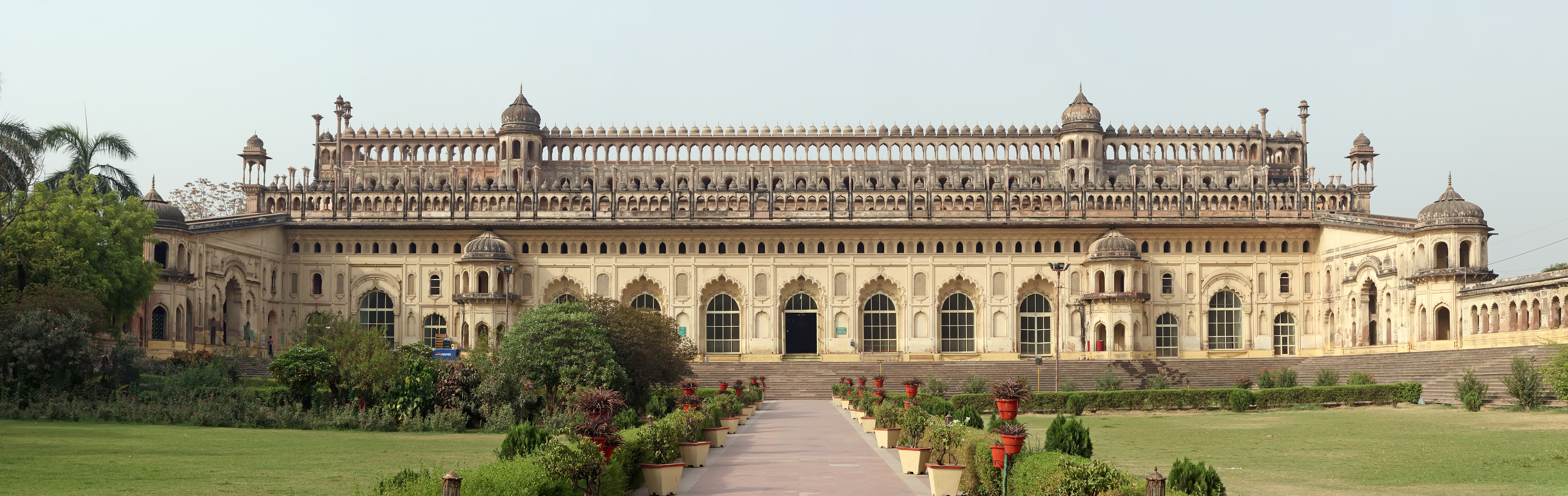
Asafi Imambara Lucknow, built by Nawab Asaf ud Daulah one of the largest Imambara of India

In India, the Shia population is distributed unevenly. Lucknow, Hyderabad, Delhi, Murshidabad, Aligarh, Mumbai, Junnair, Kolkata, Mysore, Bhopal, Chennai and Bangalore are major cities with Shia neighbourhoods. Among the Shias of India an overwhelming majority belongs to the Twelver sect, while the Shias among the Khoja and Bohra communities are mainly Nizari and Musta'li, respectively. The Dawoodi Bohras are primarily based in India, even though the Dawoodi Bohra theology originated in Yemen. India is home to the majority Dawoodi Bohra population, with most of them concentrated in Gujarat out of over 1 million followers worldwide.

India, the only non-Muslim nation in the world with Shia population of 3-7 percent of its entire population, has recognised the day of Ashura listed as Moharram as a public Holiday in India. India also has the birthday of Imam Ali as a public holiday in states of Bihar and Uttar Pradesh, whose capital Lucknow is considered as the centre of India's Shia Muslim community. The birthday of Imam Ali is not recognised as public holiday by any country other than India, Azerbaijan and Iran. When Saddam mercilessly quelled a Shia uprising in 1992, the world media remained silent and damage to the shrines of Husayn ibn Ali and his half-brother al-Abbas ibn Ali, in the course of Baathist attempts to flush out Shia rebels was a tightly kept secret of the Saddam regime, but Indian media Doordarshan was the only network in the world to have shown that footage.

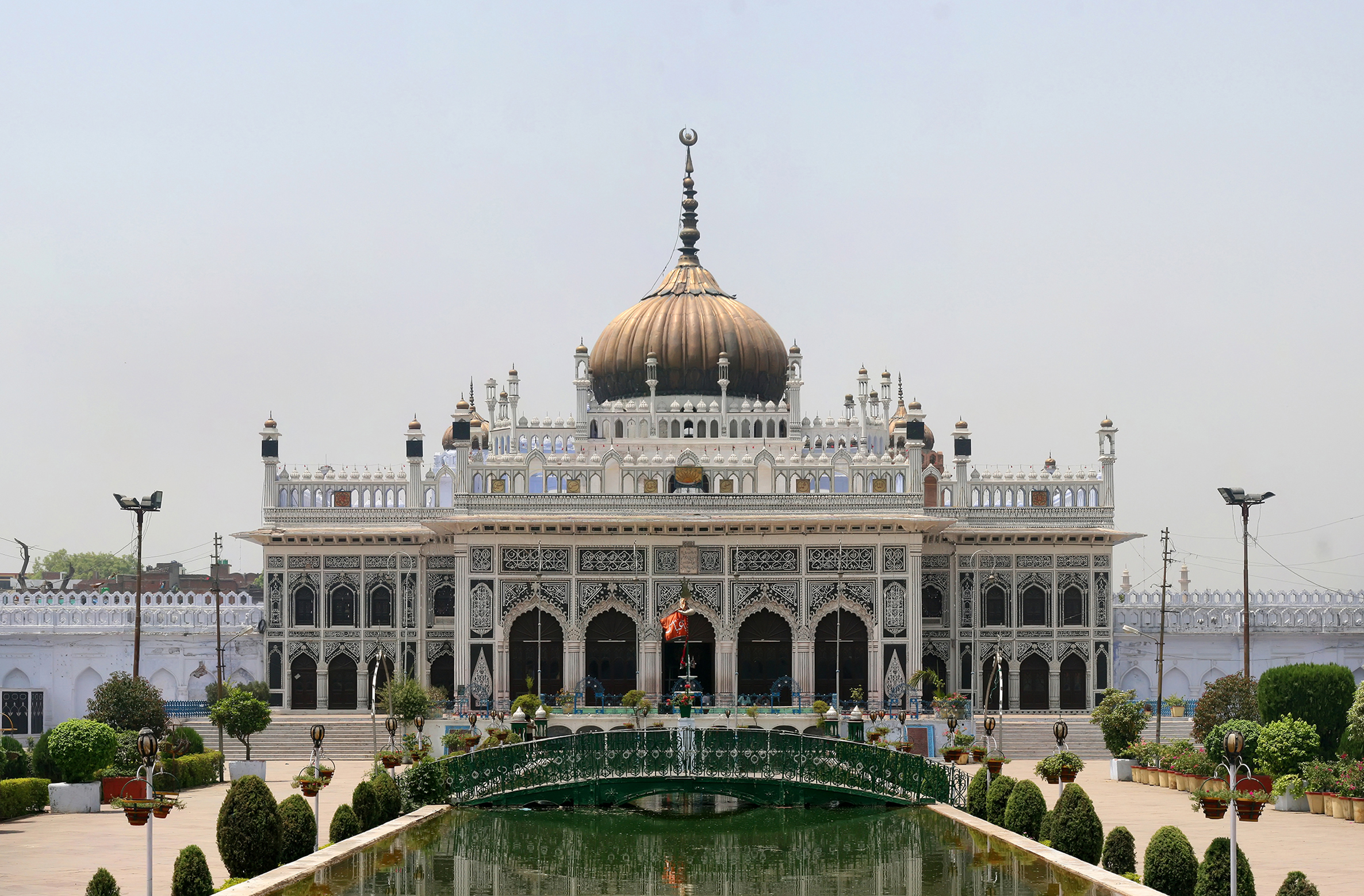
Husainabad Imambara also known as Chota Imambara at Husainabad, Lucknow, built in 1838 by King Mohammad Ali Shah of Awadh

Azadari or the mourning practice of Imam Husain ibn Ali is very much prevalent across India. One thing which is worth noting in Indian Azadari is the participation of non Muslims in Shia rituals on the day of Ashura.

The Hindu rulers of Vijayanagar during the 16th and 17th centuries even donned blackened garments and helped to arrange the Kala Tazia (Black Tazia) processions. Even the Scindias of Gwalior and the Holkar Maharajas of Indore conducted Majlis or Muharram congregations. In Lucknow Hindus regularly join Muslims in the Azadari and Alam processions. The Sufi saints of India along with the Shi'ite scholars encouraged the mixing and merging of indigenous elements from the rich cultural heritage of the land to that of Muharram thus proclaiming the message of peaceful co-existence among communities and united resistance to tyrannical authority.

The carrying of Alams through fire by men is more common. There are several occasions when these are traditionally practised particularly in the town of Vizianagaram 550 km outside of Hyderabad where 110 Alams are taken through the fire. A significant aspect of firewalking in the context of Moharram commemorations in Andhra Pradesh is the participation of Hindus in the ceremonies. In Vizinagaram 109 of the Alams are carried by Hindus. The Grand Ashura Procession In Kashmir is banned by the state government of Kashmir.

=== All India Shia Personal Law Board ===
Shias also claim to be sidelined in India, hence the All India Shia Personal Law Board was formed after segregation from the All India Muslim Personal Law Board in 2005 to address the legal needs of the Shia population. AISPLB feels that there should be a national policy for the Shias to prevent their exploitation by vested interests. The attitude of the government towards Muslims especially in Maharashtra came in for criticism. The newly formed All India Shia Personal Law Board had 69 members at the time of formation compared to 204 members in the All India Muslim Personal Law Board. The Shia body had the support of the erstwhile royal family of Lucknow, some 2000 descendants of the family claim to have extended their support. Shias claim they have been sidelined by the Sunni-dominated law board, which was set up in 1972. Maulana Mirza Mohammed Athar, president of the breakaway All India Shia Personal Law Board explained the reason for segregation saying that, Shias have formed a forum of themselves because the All India Muslim Personal Law Board never took interest in their well-being." Shias and Sunnis do not interpret family laws in a similar way. Shiites also have different Mosques and Burial grounds in India."

=== Community ===
There are notable Shia Muslims involved in many prominent Indian affairs, such as Arts, Business, Diplomates, Bureaucracies, Journalism, Sports, Science, Religion, Literature, Politics, etc.

Azim Hashim Premji, one of India's richest businessman belongs to the Shia community. Bismillah Khan, the winner of Bharat Ratna award and Badey Ghulam Ali Khan are regarded as one of the most important figures in Indian music. Shia Muslims play an important role in Indian politics as well.

Some Shia organizations in India include:-

- All India Shia Personal Law Board
- All India Shia Political Conference
- Iman Foundation Najafi House Mumbai
- Madrasah al Waizeen (College of preachers)
- Jamia Nazmia
- Department of Shia Theology, Faculty Of Theology, Aligarh Muslim University, Aligarh
- Sultan al Madaris
- Anjuman Haideri Hallaur
- All India Shia Organisation
- Shia Companions organisation

- Anjuman -e- Imamia (Bangalore)
- Tanzeemul Makatib
- Anjuman e Murtazvi junnair
- Shia Education Trust Junnair
- Husaini walefare society Junnair
- All Jammu and Kashmir Shia Association

== Shi'ism in modern Bangladesh ==
Upon partition of the subcontinent in 1947, most of the Shia neighbourhoods of Murshidabad and Calcutta became part of India. Today, there is a small Shia community in Dhaka and the western part of the country. Many of the Shias in Bangladesh originally trace their ancestry to the states of Uttar Pradesh and Bihar in India. Some parts of Bangladesh, such as Moulvibazar in Greater Sylhet and Chittagong were also influenced by an influx of Iranian settlers like the Prithimpassa family, who were able to spread Shia Islam in the Kulaura Upazila of Moulvibazar.

== See also ==
- Islam in Pakistan
- Abdullah Shah Ghazi
- Saadat Zaidpur
- Grand Ashura Procession In Kashmir
- List of Shia Muslim dynasties
- Public Holidays in India
- Five Martyrs of Shia Islam
- Persecution of Shia Muslims
- Sectarian violence in Pakistan
- Shia Islam in Bangladesh
- Shia Islam in Pakistan
- Sayyid in Uttar Pradesh
- Alipur, Karnataka
- Sayyid in Gujarat
- Sadaat Nasirabad
- Hallaur
- Naugawan Saadat
- Sadaat Amroha
- Sadat e Bara
- Ayatollah Dildar Ali Naqvi Naseerabadi
- Ghulam Rasool Noori
- Moulvi Muhammad Baqir Dehlvi
- Professor Saiyid Athar Abbas Rizvi
- Religion in India
