= Syed Ali Nasir Saeed Abaqati =

21st-century Indian Shia cleric

Hujjatul Islam Syed Ali Nasir Saeed Abaqati
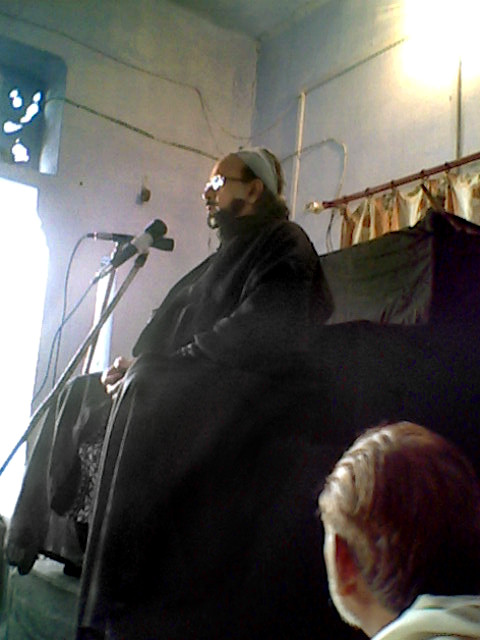
- Agha Roohi addressing a Majlis
- Title: Roohul Millat

Personal life
- Born: Lucknow, India
- Children: Abbas Nasir Saeed (son), Murtaza Nasir Saeed (son)
- Parent: Saeed-ul-Millat Syed Mohammad Saeed (father)
- Era: Modern era
- Main interest(s): Kalam, Azadari, Tabarra
- Other name: Agha Roohi
- Relatives: Hamid Husain, Tahir Jarwali, Abbas Irshad

Religious life
- Religion: Islam
- Lineage: Abaqati family
- Jurisprudence: Ja`fari
- Creed: Usuli Twelver Shi`a Islam

Syed Ali Nasir Saeed Abaqati Musavi, known as Roohul Millat and Agha Roohi, is a Shia cleric from Lucknow, Uttar Pradesh, India famous for his grizzled beard and anti Aisha speeches.

== Family background ==
Syed Ali Nasir Saeed Abaqati popularly known as Agha Roohi is a Shia scholar from Lucknow, India and comes from the family of Syed Mir Hamid Hussain Musavi whose book `Abaqat al'anwar fi imamat al 'A'immat al'athar is popular among Twelver Shi'a scholars worldwide, and quoted even today.

He belongs to the lineage of Syed Mohammad Quli Khan. His family is renowned and respected in Lucknow, where his father Saeed-ul-Millat Syed Mohammad Saeed and grandfather Syed Nasir-ul-Millat enjoyed much respect in their lifetimes. His ancestral town is Kintoor, Barabanki, Uttar Pradesh and he traces his lineage to Muhammad via Imam Musa al-Kazim, hence the name "Musavi".

== His majalis (religious lectures) ==
He is an exponent of Tabarra, openly curse the enemies of Hussainiyat, the killers of Imam Hussain.

Agha Roohi recites the ashra-e-majalis (religious lecture to commemorate the Martyrdom of Imam Hussain, spanning ten days) at Shia PG College (at Victoria Street in Nakhas) in morning and at Afzal Mahal in evening. He also addresses a majlis at Karbala Talkatora, where procession of tazia, to signify the mortal remains of Maula Ali culminates on 21 of the month of Ramadan every year since the earlier ban order was revoked in 1999. Apart from majalis in Lucknow he often was invited in other cities too, e.g., Allahabad.

== Involvement in community matters, demonstrations and rallies ==
- He has been involved in issues related to the Mazar-e-Shahid Salis, Agra.
- He has been involved in political activism related to affairs of Shia community for long. In 1969, he alongside Moulana Dr. Kalbe Sadiq addressed a press conference alongside Jana Sangh's leader Nanaji Deshmukh, when they were ′invited to tell the world the sufferings their sect had undergone′. In 1993 when he was President of the All India Shia Husaini Council he joined political party BJP.
- In 2002, he organised 'Anti Terrorism Week' which included demonstrations, burning of effigies of Osama bin Laden, Mulla Omar, Pervez Musharraf and the Pakistan flag.
- In 2006, he was removed from the board of Shia College, Lucknow.
- In May 2006, he opposed 'new model nikahnama' for the Shia community issued by All India Shia Personal Law Board, headed by Maulana Mirza Mohammed Athar.
- He held al-Qaeda responsible for 2006–2007 destruction of the Al-Askari Mosque in Samarra, Iraq.
- In 2009, the Law Commission's report on bigamy resulted in opposition from All India Muslim Personal Law Board, Agha Roohi suggested Law Commission to talk to clerics over this issue.
- On 14 November 2010, he and fellow cleric Kalbe Jawad tried to stop the annual meeting of the board of trustees at Shia Post Graduate Degree College because it was being held on a Sunday. The men were taken into preventive custody but were released when violent protests broke out.
- On 19 June 2014, he organised a demonstration to protest killing of innocents by Islamic State of Iraq and Syria at Dargah Hazrat Abbas, Lucknow. Addressing the crowd, he said,
  "ISIS is a great threat not only to Islam but the entire humanity and what must be understood by Muslims across the globe is that these brutal attacks on Holy Shrines clearly smells of conspiracy which must be countered by remaining united."
- In April 2017, he issued a statement vowing to end cow slaughter.
- In 2019, he alongside other Shia clerics like Imam-e-Juma of Asafi Mosque Maulana Kalbe Jawad, president of the Shia Moon Committee Maulana Saif Abbas, academician and cleric Maulana Kalbe Sibtain Noori, spokesperson of All India Shia Personal Law Board Maulana Yasoob Abbas, etc. signed the memorandum demanding the maintenance of sanctity and religious fibre of 235-year-old Bara Imambara precincts.
- In 2020, he alongside other Shia clerics Maulana Kalbe Sadiq, Maulana Kalbe Jawad, Maulana Yasoob Abbas, Maulana Abbas Irshad, Maulana Saif Abbas, etc. requested Archaeological Survey of India for immediate assessment and time-bound restoration of the centrally protected monument Imambara Sibtainabad.

=== Renowned Scholar Expresses Concern Over Current State of Affairs ===
He has made it clear that if the authorities and national and religious leaders had made thoughtful decisions, the country’s situation would be quite different today. Maulana Agha Roohi acknowledges that while this may not be the opportune time to criticize political leaders and officials, turning a blind eye and remaining silent about realities seems to be equivalent to neglecting the rights of troubled people. The plight faced by millions of workers, the needy, and the unemployed in our society has revealed the stark contradiction between the words and actions of our leaders. While these helpless workers wait helplessly at bus stops, whether they reach their homes safely or not, this blood-soaked caravan is leading the country towards an uncertain destination.

== Family ==
His elder son Maulana Syed Abbas Nasir Saeed Abaqati (b. 1986), a PhD student in Shia theology, fought against the Islamic State in Iraq and Syria (ISIS, or IS) while he was studying at Najaf University (Al-Hawza al-'Ilmiyya fi al-Najaf al-Ashraf Islamic seminary) in July 2014 when clashes with the ISIS broke out in Iraq he joined it. Apart from other majalis he now addresses majlis at Shia College during first 10 days of Muharram. He is president of Anjuman Moinuzzaireen which manages Mazaar-e-Shaheed-e-Saalis while his younger brother Syed Murtaza Nasir Saeed is secretary and his uncles (half-brothers of Agha Roohi) Maulana Syed Sajjad Nasir Saeed Abaqati and Syed Husain Nasir Saeed are patron and Mutawalli respectively.

== See also ==
- Islamic scholars
