= Abaqati family =

Family of the Nishapuri Kintoori Sayyids

The Abaqati family (or Khandān-e-Abaqāat) is a sub-branch of the Jarwal-Kintoor branch of Nishapuri Kazmi-Musavi Sayeds who trace their lineage to the Islamic prophet Muhammad through the eldest son of the great-grandson of Musa al-Kadhim, he was given a jagir in Jarwal-Kintoor by Sultan Muhammad Tughluq, his other two brothers were given jagirs in Budgam, Kashmir and Sylhet, Bengal.

The most famous of Kintoori Sayyeds is Syed Mir Hamid Hussain Musavi Saheb-e-Abaqaat, author of a work titled Abaqat al Anwar; the first word in the title of this work provided his descendants with the nisba (title) they still bear, Abaqati. Syed Ali Nasir Saeed Abaqati Agha Roohi, a Lucknow based cleric is from the family of Nishapuri Kintoori Sayyids and uses title Abaqati.

== Sayeds of Jarwal-Kintoor ==
The Nishapuri Sada'at (Sayeds) of Barabanki (adjoining areas of Kintoor, Fatehpur, Jarwal and Lucknow) are Kazmi or Musavi Sayeds; that is they claim descent from the Prophet through his daughter's line and the line of the seventh Imam of the Shi'a Muslims, Musa al-Kazem. They came to India originally from Nishapur a town near Mashhad in northeastern Iran. Two brothers Sayed Sharafu'd-Din Abu Talib (who was the ancestor of Waris 'Ali) and Sayed Muhammed in thirteenth century left Nishapur, Iran (via Khorasan and Mashhad) for Awadh, India in the time of Hulagu Khan (1256–1265), the Il-Khanid Mongol ruler. After their arrival in Kintoor the Saiyids were given a large jagir by Sultan Muhammad Tughluq, where they continued to hold the land in different tenures until the twentieth century at the turn of which they held two-thirds of the village land of Kintoor. Sayed Alauddin Kazmi was said to have accompanied these two brothers in their journey from Iran, he later moved to Tehsil Fatehpur. The grave of Sayed Alauddin Kazmi is situated in Kintoor. The Kazmis of Fatehpur are his descendants. These Nishapuri Sayeds of Kintoor spread to the adjoining localities of Barabanki e.g. Fatehpur, and even to neighbouring districts e.g. Jarwal in Bahraich district and in Lucknow. These Nishapuri Sayeds produced several outstanding Shia Muslim religious scholars in the 18th, 19th and 20th centuries.

Many of the early Sufi saints who came to North India belonged to Sayyid families. Most of these Sayyid families came from Central Asia and Iran, but some also originated from Yemen, Oman, Iraq and Bahrain. Perhaps the most famous Sufi was Syed Salar Masud, from whom many of the Sayyid families of Awadh claim their descent.

The Sayyids of Jarwal (Bahraich), Kintoor (Barabanki) and Zaidpur (Barabanki) were well-known Taluqadars (feudal lords) of Awadh province.

=== Sayyids of Kintoor ===
Zayn al-'Abidin al-Musavi who was progenitor of Sayeds of Kintoor was the great-great-grandfather of Sayed Ahmed.

The Sayeds of Kintoor can be categorized into two prominent families, namely, the Abaqati (that of Sayed Hamid Hussain) and the Khomeini (that of Sayed Ahmed).

==== Abaqati family ====
One branch of the Nishapuri Kintoori Sayeds took root in Lucknow. The most famous of Kintoori Sayeds is Ayatollah Syed Mir Hamid Hussain Musavi, author of the work titled Abaqat al Anwar; the first word in the title of this work provided his descendants with the nisba (title) they still bear, Abaqati. Syed Ali Nasir Saeed Abaqati Agha Roohi, a Lucknow based cleric is from the family of Nishapuri Kintoori Sayeds and uses title Abaqati.

==== Khomeini family ====
Towards the end of the 18th century the ancestors of the Supreme Leader of the Iranian Revolution, Ruhollah Khomeini had migrated from their original home in Nishapur, Iran to the kingdom of Oudh in northern India whose rulers were Twelver Shia Muslims of Persian origin; they settled in the town of Kintoor. Ayatollah Khomeini's paternal grandfather, Seyyed Ahmad Musavi Hindi, was born in Kintoor, he was a contemporary and relative of the famous scholar Ayatollah Syed Mir Hamid Hussain Musavi. He left Lucknow in the middle of the 19th century on pilgrimage to the tomb of Imam Ali in Najaf, Iraq and never returned. According to Moin this movement was to escape the colonial rule of the British Raj in India. He visited Iran in 1834 and settled down in Khomein in 1839. Although he stayed and settled in Iran, he continued to be known as Hindi, even Ruhollah Khomeini used Hindi as a pen name in some of his ghazals. Also, Ruhollah's brother was known by the name Nureddin Hindi.

=== Sayyids of Jarwal ===
In Jarwal, Bahraich, the Sayyid line derived from Sayyid Zakariyya, who fled Iran during the Mongol invasion by Genghis Khan, obtaining a 15,000 bigha grant from the Delhi sovereign, Ghiyathu'd-Din. They settled in Jarwal after moving from Persia to Lahore to Delhi to Barabanki. In 1800 the Jarwal Sayyids, some of them Shi‘is, displaced the Ansari Shaykhs and came to hold 276 out of 365 villages in the parganah, although their holdings thereafter declined rapidly to (a still formidable) 76 villages in 1877. Khateeb-ul-Iman Maulana Syed Muzaffar Husain Rizvi Tahir Jarwali (1932-Dec 1987) a Shia religious leader and social worker, was one of the prominent Jarwali Sayyids and celebrated preacher of late 20th century (1970s & 80s), he was also General Secretary of All India Shia Conference for some time.

== Personalities ==
- Syed Muhammad Quli Musavi Kintoori (1775-1844), principal Sadr Amin at the British court in Meerut; author of Tathir al-mu'minin 'an najasat al-mushrikin
- Syed Ahmad Musavi Hindi (1800-1969), the paternal grandfather of the supreme leader of the Islamic republic of Iran, Ruhollah Khomeini.
- Syed Hamid Hussain Musavi Kintoori Lakhnavi Hindi Neshapuri (1830-1880), son of Syed Muhammad Quli author of book Abaqat ul Anwar fi Imamat al Ai'imma al-Athar
- Ghulam Hasnain Kintoori (1831-1918), brother-in law of Hamid Husain. He was appointed as Sajaada nashin (head) of Madarsa-i-Shahi from 1855-56 by Nawab of Oudh. Apart from being prolific and multilingual scholar of Arabic, Persian and Urdu languages he is also remembered for his involvement in fields of education. From involvement in Madrasa Imaniya project in 1870s to be being opponent of Aligarh movement. He established newspaper Akhbar-ul-Akhiyar in 1870s and was main Shia representative in Nadwatul Ulama in 1890s.
- Syed Nasir Husain Nasir-ul-Millat (1867-1942) son of Hamid Husain was only marja al-taqlid of the era in British India. He was peshnamaz of Lucknow's Kufa Mosque and early pioneer of Anjuman-i-Sadr-ul-Suddor and All India Shia Conference. He was a senior supporter of tabarra agitation.
- Syed Muhammad Naseer Naseer-ul-Millat (1895-1966) was Nasir Husain's eldest son was associated to tabarra agitation. He was member of Uttar Pradesh Legislative Council for over a decade.
- Syed Ali Nasir Saeed Abaqati Musavi Agha Roohi, a Lucknow based cleric; son of Syed Mohammad Saeed Saeed-ul-Millat

== See also ==
- Ijtihadi family (or Khandan-e-Ijtihad)

== External ==
- Jones, Justin (2011). Shi'a Islam in Colonial India: Religion, Community and Sectarianism. Cambridge University Press. ISBN 978-1-139-50123-1.
- "Scholarship in a sayyid family of Avadh I: Musavī Nīshāpūrī of Kintūr". Archived from the original on 2 April 2015.
