= Kintoor =

Parijat Dham Barauliya
- Village
- Location in Uttar Pradesh, India
- Coordinates: 27.019°N 81.486°E
- Country: India
- State: Uttar Pradesh
- District: Barabanki

Languages
  - Official: Hindi
  - Additional official: Urdu
  - Regional: Awadhi
- Time zone: UTC+5:30 (IST)
- PIN: 225207
- Vehicle registration: UP-41

Parijatdham Barauliya is a village in the Barabanki district of the Awadh region of central Uttar Pradesh, India. It is famous for the Battle of Barauliya of 1858 during the Indian Mutiny and being home to the learned Sayyids of Awadh, North India.

== Battle of Kintoor ==
Battle of Kintoor
- Part of the Indian Mutiny
Date	6 October 1858
Location	Kintoor
Result	British victory

Belligerents
East India Company Kapurthala State Akali-Nihangs	Rebel Sepoys

Commanders and leaders
Major A.Hume Commanding 1st European Bengal Fusiliers Raja of Kapurthala Commanding Kapurthala Contingent Akali Prahlad Singh	Collector Darakhaje; Collector Abid Khan; Major-General Abson Khan; Mohamed Ameer Khan

Strength
1st Bengal Fusiliers, 150 rank and file; 2nd Company 3rd battalion Artillery, two 9-pounder guns; Hodson's Horse, 56 sabres; Oude Military Police Cavalry, 200 sabres; Kappurthullah Contingent:- Artillery, five 8-pounder, three 6-pounder guns; Cavalary, 124 sabres; Infantry, 650 rank and file	3,000 infantry 200–300 cavalry 4 guns

Casualties and losses
4 wounded 1 horse killed, 7 wounded	450 killed

The Battle of Kintoor was a conflict between rebel sepoys and troops East India Company and Kapurthala State on 6 October 1858 during Indian Mutiny.

== British Raj ==
During 1869 census of Oudh, Kintoor was designated as one of the total thirteen large towns or qasbas and Inspector of Police of Ramnagar was appointed here on the night of census.

== Personalities ==
=== Nishapuri Sada'at of Kintoor ===
Many of the early Sufi saints that came to North India belonged to Sayyid families. Most of these Sayyid families came from Central Asia and Iran, but some also originate from Yemen, Oman, Iraq and Bahrain. Perhaps the most famous Sufi was Syed Salar Masud, from whom many of the Sayyid families of Awadh claim their descent. Sayyids of Jarwal (Bahraich), Kintoor (Barabanki) and Zaidpur (Barabanki) were wellknown Taluqadars (feudal lords) of Awadh province.

==== Abaqati family ====
A branch of the Nishapuri Kintoori Sayeds moved to Lucknow. The most famous of Kintoori Sayeds is Ayatollah Syed Mir Hamid Hussain Musavi, author of work entitled Abaqat al Anwar; the first word in the title of this work provided his descendants with the nisba (title) they still bear, Abaqati. Syed Ali Nasir Saeed Abaqati Agha Roohi, a Lucknow based cleric is from the family of Nishapuri Kintoori Sayeds and uses title Abaqati.

=== Literary ===
==== Urdu/Persian (19th century) ====
- Abd ul-Qadir Hanif-ud-Din Kintoori (died 1789): a Sufi of Qadri order. His ancestors emigrated from Nishapur, Iran, and served as jurists. He was author of the book Kuhl ul-jawahir fi manaqib-i-'Abd ul-Qadir Jilani(1753).
- Ayatollah Mufti Syed Muhammad Quli Khan Kintoori (1775-1844): principal Sadr Amin at the British court in Meerut. He was author of Tathir al-mu'minin 'an najasat al-mushrikin.
- Syed Ahmad Musavi Hindi (1800-1869), was born in Kintoor (Kingdom of Awadh / Oudh State) and was the paternal grandfather of Ruhollah Musavi Khomeini, the first supreme leader of the Islamic Republic of Iran. His ancestors had migrated in the late 18th century from their home in Nishapur near the shrine city of Mashhad to the Kingdom of Awadh, whose rulers were Twelver Shi'a Muslims of Persian origin.
- Syed Sirāj Ḥusayn Musavi Kintoori (1823-1865): son of Mufti Syed Muhammad Quli Kintoori, he was author of Kashf al-ḥujub wa-l-astār ʿan asmāʾ al-kutub wa-l-asfār, Shudhūr al-ʿiqyān fī tarājim al-aʿyān and Āʾīna-yi ḥaqq-numā.
- Syed Iʿjāz Ḥusayn Musavi Kintoori (1825-1870),

son of Mufti Syed Muhammad Quli Kintoori

- Ayatollah Syed Mir Hamid Hussain Musavi Kintoori Lakhnavi (1830-1880): son of Mufti Syed Muhammad Quli Kintoori author of book Abaqat ul Anwar fi Imamat al Ai'imma al-Athar.
- Allama Hakeem Sayyid Ghulam-ul-Hasnain Kanturi (1829 or 1832-1919), born in Kantur, a Lucknow-based polymath whose scholarship spanned classical islamic sciences, philosophy, and medicine. Major works include Intesar-ul-Islam.
- Qazi Mahmud Kintoori author of Mirat i Madari.

==== Urdu/Persian (20th century) ====
- Justice Maulvi Syed Karāmat Ḥusayn Musavi Kintoori (1854-1917): son of Syed Sirāj Ḥusayn Musavi Kintoori, he founded Karmat College, Lucknow.

=== Others ===
- Seyyed Ahmad Musavi Hindi: Paternal grandfather of Ruholla Khomeini. He was born in Kintoor.
- Film writer Haider Rizvi is from Kintoor and has written famous Indian comedy shows like The great Indian Laughter Challenge, the feature film Siya and Rajkumar Rao starrer film Bhool Chuk Maaf.

== Attractions ==
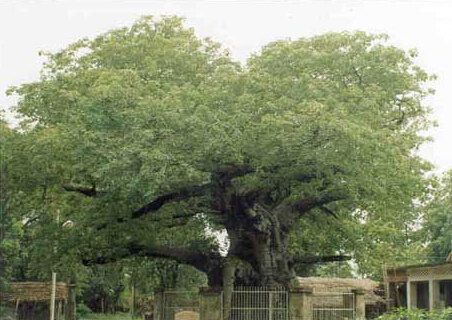
Parijat tree at Kintoor, Barabanki

- Parijaat tree a sacred baobab tree on the banks of Ghaghra.
- The famous Kunteshwar Temple – dedicated to Lord Shiva.
