= Syed Saif Abbas Naqvi =

Indian Muslim cleric

- Title: Hujjatul Islam wal Muslimin

Personal life
- Born: Syed Saif Abbas Naqvi S/o Najmul Ulema Syed Ali Naqvi S/o Mumtazul Ulema Syed Mohd alias (Meeran Sahab) S/o Zainul Ulema Syed Mohd Taqi S/O Syed Ibraheem S/o Mumtazul Ulema Syed Taqi Jannat'maab S/o Saiyyadul Ulema Syed Hussain S/o Syed Dildar Ali Ghufra'maab
- Region: Uttar Pradesh
- Education: Lucknow University; Syrian Islamic Theology School
- Occupation: President, Shia Markazi Chand Committee, Lucknow; Shahi Imam, Shahi Masjid, Chota Imambara, Lucknow; Managing Director, Hauza Ilmiya Abutalib; Ex-Member, Haj Committee of India; Legal Representative, The Grand Islamic Authority Ayatollah Saiyed Sadiq Hussaini al Shirazi; Controller, Jannat Maab Society; General Secretary, Darussaqaline Trust; General Secretary, Maula Ali Orphanage; President, Najmul Ulema Academy; President, Markazi Shia Chand Committee; General Secretary, Shia Religious Charitable Relief Trust

Religious life
- Religion: Islam
- Denomination: Usuli Twelver Shia
- Jurisprudence: Jaʽfari jurisprudence
- Website: Linkedin, Twitter, Facebook, Youtube

Syed Saif Abbas Naqvi (مولانا سيد نقوى) is a Twelver Shia Muslim cleric from India. He is president of the office of Shia Markazi Chand Committee in Lucknow He is one of the prominent Shia clerics of Lucknow.

== Family background ==
He comes from a family of scholars known as "Khandan-e-Ijtihad", and traces his lineage from Dildar Ali Naseerabadi (also known as Ghufran Ma'ab), their ancestors came from Sabzevar.

== Positions and activities ==
He has held following positions:

- President, Shia Markazi Chand Committee, Lucknow
- Managing Director, Hauza Ilmiya Abutalib
- Official Representative of Ayatullah Sadiq Shirazi
- Ex-Member, Haj Committee of India
- Legal Representative, The Grand Islamic Authority Ayatollah Saiyed Sadiq Hussaini al Shirazi
- Controller, Jannat Maab Society
- General Secretary, Darussaqaline Trust
- General Secretary, Maula Ali Orphanage
- President, Najmul Ulema Academy
- President, Markazi Shia Chand Committee
- General Secretary, Shia Religious Charitable Relief Trust
- Shahi Imam, Shahi Masjid, Chota Imambara, Lucknow

=== Anti profile-pic statement ===
In 2013, he said, women should not post pictures on Facebook.

=== Against photo shoots at Bara Imambara complex ===
In June 2020, he along with Imam-e-Juma of Asafi Mosque at the Bara Imambara Maulana Kalbe Jawad, academician and cleric Maulana Kalbe Sibtain Noori, senior cleric Maulana Agha Roohi, spokesperson of All India Shia Personal Law Board Maulana Yasoob Abbas and Maulana Abbas Irshad, have all signed the memorandum against photo shoots at Bara Imambara complex.

=== Involvement in anti-CAA demonstrations and rallies ===
In March–April 2020, he was involved in Citizenship Amendment Act protests. For which Lucknow Police issued notice to him.

=== Support to COVID-19 lockdown ===
In April 2020, he asked people to abide by lockdown norms during the COVID-19 pandemic in India.

== See also ==
- Ijtihadi family
