= Tabarra agitation =

Tabarra Agitation in Lucknow

Tabarra Agitation
- Part of Religious violence in India
- Lucknow (India)
- Location: Lucknow, Uttar Pradesh, India
- Target: Azadari in Lucknow
- Weapon: civil disobedience movement
- Perpetrators: 18,000 Shias were jailed during months of March, April, and May 1939
- Motive: Defence of Azadari

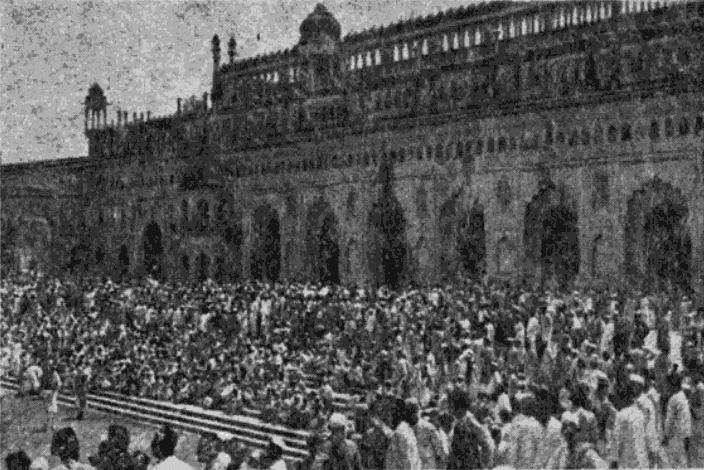
Crowds of Shia volunteer arrestees assembled in the compound of Asaf-ud-Daula Imambada (Bara Imambara) in preparation of tabarra, April 1939

The 1939 Tabarra agitation was an event when some 18,000 Shias were jailed during months of March, April, and May 1939 in Lucknow, India.

A civil disobedience movement was at once started by Shias following the Congress Government communique of 31 March 1939 (which allowed reciting of previously banned Madhe-Sahaba at public meetings). Sunnis called off their civil disobedience movement but its effect on Shias was far greater than anticipated; they had the authority of two committees (Piggot committee and Allsop committee) and the practice of thirty years in support of their position. Some 1800 Shias courted arrest, including prominent Shia figures such as Syed Ali Zaheer (newly elected MLA from Allahabad-Jaunpur), the Princes of the former royal family of Awadh, Sayed Muhammad Naseer Naseer-ul-Millat the son of Maulana Nasir a respected Shia mujtahid (the eldest son, student and designated successor of Maulana Sayed Nasir Hussain of Abaqati family), Shamshiir-e-Tabarra Ayatullah Syed Ali Shabbar Naqvi., Maulana Sayed Kalb-e-Husain and his son Maulana Kalb-e-Abid (both of Nasirabadi/Ijtihadi family) ) and the brothers of Raja of Salempur and the Raja of Pirpur, important ML leaders. It was believed that Maulana Nasir himself besides the top ranking ML leaders such as Raja of Mahmudabad and Raja of Pirpur would together court arrest. Maulana Azad, appointed an arbitrator by the parties, called a conference of Shias and Sunnis, but it failed to produce a settlement. Azad conveyed to Sir Haig, the Governor, his view that the communique was 'based on inadequate appreciation of the situation and, therefore, an error of judgement'. But, this statement came just a day before the Barawafat, and a Madhe-Sahaba procession was taken out. The Shias too were allowed a counter-procession, it was disturbed and resulted in a serious riot. Several people died and police had to open fire several times. The following year i.e. 1940, the district authorities banned the public recitation of Madhe-Sahaba and Tabarra in processions and meetings held in public places.

== See also ==
- Tabarra
- Madhe Sahaba Agitation
- Azadari in Lucknow
