= Al-Musawi =

Surname

Musawi or Kazmi الموسَوي / کاظمي
- Hashemite Arab Tribe
- Ethnicity: Arab
- Nisba: al-Mūsawī الموسوي
- Location: Iraq; Kuwait; Lebanon; Saudi Arabia; Bahrain; Yemen; Iran; Pakistan
- Descended from: Mūsā al-Kāẓim ibn Jaʿfar al-Ṣādiq ibn Muḥammad al-Bāqir ibn Zayn al-ʿĀbidīn ʿAlī ibn Al-Ḥusayn ibn ʿAlī ibn Abī Ṭālib
- Parent tribe: Banu Hashim; Husaynids; Al-Ja'fari
- Branches: Kazmi/Ridhwi; Al-Rifa'i (Iraq); Al-Ahdal (Yemen); Al Qasimi (United Arab Emirates); al-Sadr family (Lebanon/Iraq); Al Zheek family (Iraq); Al Faiz family (Iraq); Al-Hadidiy (Iraq/Syria); Al-Shahristani family (Iraq/Iran); Sharif al-Ulama family (Iran)
- Language: Arabic
- Religion: Sunni Islam and Shia Islam
- Surnames: Sayyid, al-Kazmi, Rizvi, al-Musawi

al-Musawi (Arabic: الموسَوي, romanized: al-Mūsawī) is an Islamic title indicating a person descended from Musa al-Kazim, the seventh of the Twelve Imams. Family members from this dynasty are amongst the most respected and well-known Muslims. Members of this family are referred to by the anglicized version of their name. The name is written in many different ways and forms, including but not limited to: (Al-, El-) Musawi, Mosawi, Moussawi, Moosawi, Musawy, Mousawy, Mousawi, Moosvi, Mosawy (Arabic transliteration), Mosavi, Moosavi, Mosawe, or Moussaoui (in the French transliteration) Moosawi (Bahraini translation) Al Mosawi (English translation), etc.

The al-Musawi family is one of the largest and most influential Muslim families in the world. All Musawi's are descendants from the Musa Al-Kadhim son of Imam Ja'far al-Sadiq, their bloodline tracing all the way through each of the first six Twelve Imams, to the first; Imam Ali Bin Abi Talib, along with his wife Fatimah, the daughter of the Muhammad. Members of the al-Musawi family are referred to with the title Sayyid, as an honorific title, it denotes males accepted as the direct descendants of Muhammad. For example, Aga Syed Mohammad Hadi Almoosavi

Members of the Al-Musawi family are mainly Shi'a Muslims found in Iran, Iraq, Afghanistan, Lebanon, India, Pakistan, GCC countries, and other parts of the world. According to family tradition, the original roots of the Al-Musawi family comes from the head tribe of Banu Hashim.

== Prominent members ==
=== In the GCC countries ===
- Sayyid Ala Sayyid Mohammad Sayyid Ahmed Sayyid Abed Al-Musawi - Is a Kuwaiti oral and maxillofacial surgeon and former university teacher. Grandson of Sayyid Ahmed Sayyid Abed Al-Musawi, former member of the Kuwaiti government. He has a street in Kuwait named after him.
- Sulaimaan Rabi' Al-Musawi - (1812- 1895) A renowned Kuwaiti teacher who taught Mubarak the Great the Emir of Kuwait. He opened a school in the Grand Mosque of Kuwait.
- Mohammed Mehdi al-Qazwini - renowned religious scholar, proposed the idea of the third wall of Kuwait in 1920.
- Muhammad Hassan Al-Musawi - (1912 - 12 January 1995) was one of the most prominent and pioneering Kuwaiti educators. He was the grandson of Sayyid Sulaimaan Rabi' Al-Musawi. He was chosen as the principal of the Jafari School in Kuwait and introduced English and Arabic Literature and Grammar to the school. He served from 1942 to 1973 earning him the title of "The Educator of Generations". He developed and re-organised the curricula of different subjects including Science and PE, introduced the Unified Examinations system, Seat Numbers, School Reports (Transcripts), all of which are still used across all public schools in Kuwait. When he got sick and was offered to be sent abroad for treatment, he refused saying "I don't want to die in a strange land."
- Muhammad Baqir al-Muhri - (1948 - 2015) was one of the most prominent scholars in Kuwait's history. He was a deputy of about 15 marja', the founder of the Islamic-Christian Relationships Council, the founder of The Congregation of Muslim Scholars in Kuwait, Imam of Imam Ali Mosque in Kuwait, politician and newspaper writer, and the author of The Philosophy and secrets of Hajj book.
- Dhiyaa Al-Musawi - Bahraini author and cleric.
- Hussain Al-Musawi - Kuwaiti footballer and one of Al-Arabi SC top scorers.
- Mohammad Al-Mosawi - Kuwaiti karateka and Olympics athlete.

=== In Iran ===
- Ruhollah Khomeini - (September 1902 – 3 June 1989) An Iranian religious leader and scholar, politician, and leader of the 1979 Iranian Revolution. (Khomeini is of Musawi descent, as he is a descendant of the Safavid dynasty.)
- Abu al-Qasim al-Khoei - One of the most influential Twelver Shi'a Islamic scholars of the 20th century.
- Mir-Hossein Mousavi - Iranian reformist politician who served as the 49th and last Prime Minister of Iran from 1981 to 1989. He was a reformist candidate for the 2009 Iranian presidential election and led the Green Revolution.
- Mohammad Ali Mousavi Jazayeri - Iranian Twelver Shi'a cleric, was the previous representative of Wali-Faqih in Khuzestan province + Ahwaz Imam of Friday.
- Abdorrahim Musavi - Chief of the Joint Staff of the Iranian armed forces.
- Mujtaba Musavi Lari - Shi'a Twelver Islamic scholar.
- Ali Mousavi - Iranian football player.
- Mohammad Vaez Mousavi - Iranian Shiite cleric and politician.
- Fakhraddin Mousavi - Iranian judge and politician.
- Farid Mousavi - Iranian politician.
- Seyed Mohsen Mousavi - Iranian diplomat.
- Abdolrahim Mousavi - Iranian general.
- Ahmad Mousavi - Iranian football player.
- Alireza Mousavi - Iranian handball player.
- Danial Mousavi - Iranian football player.
- Iman Mousavi - Iranian footballer.
- Kaveh Mousavi - Iranian athlete.
- Mohammad Mousavi - Iranian volleyball player.
- Seyed Ayoub Mousavi - Iranian weightlifter.
- Farshid Moussavi - Iranian-born British architect
- Granaz Moussavi - Iranian-born Australian poet, film director and screenwriter
- Mohammad Mofti-ol-shia Mousavi - Iranian Twelver Shi'a Marja
- Abu l-Hasan al-Isfahani - Shi'a Marja
- Seyed Ali Mousavi - nephew of Mir-Hossein Mousavi who was killed during the 2009 Iranian election protests.

=== In Afghanistan ===
- Syed Askar Mousavi - Afghan author
- Jamaluddin Mousavi - Afghan TV presenter

=== In Iraq ===
- Abul-Hasan Muhammad ibn Al-Hussein Al-Musawi "ash-Sharif al-Radhi" - (~930-977 CE) A Muslim scholar and poet who was born in Baghdad. His most famous book is Nahj al-Balaghah which is a collection of Imam Ali's sayings and speeches.
- Nasrallah al-Haeri - Religious scholar and poet, played an important role in inner-Islamic ecumenical dialogue during the Ottoman era.
- Madhiha Hassan Al-Musawi - An aid worker for the Iraqi government who some people have begun calling the "Mother Teresa of Baghdad"
- Husain al-Radi - General secretary of the Iraqi Communist Party.
- Musa al-Musawi - Known for writing polemical revisionist texts on Islam
- Ibrahim al-Jaafari - Politician who was Prime Minister of Iraq in the Iraqi Transitional Government from 2005 to 2006, following the January 2005 election. He served as Minister of Foreign Affairs from 2014 to 2018.
- Hassan al-Qazwini - Founder and leader of the Islamic Center of America in Dearborn, Michigan, representing the Twelver Shi'a branch of Islam

=== In Lebanon ===
- Abbas al-Musawi - (1952 - 16 February 1992) An influential Muslim scholar and cleric.
- Husayn Al-Musawi - Lebanese who founded the now-dissolved Shi'a Islamist militia Islamic Amal in 1982.
- Ibrahim Mousawi - Lebanese journalist and media relations officer.

=== In India ===
- Hamid Hussain Musavi - was a leading scholar of his time in India.
- Hamid Hussain Musavi - Indian scholar
- Muhammad Quli Musavi - Indian scholar
- Nawabs of Oudh - rulers of Oudh until 1856

=== In Pakistan ===
- Agha Syed Hamid Ali Shah Moosavi - Leader of TNFJ, Pakistan

== See also ==
- Safavid dynasty
