= Syed Muzaffar Husain Rizvi =

Indian Shia leader (1929–1987)

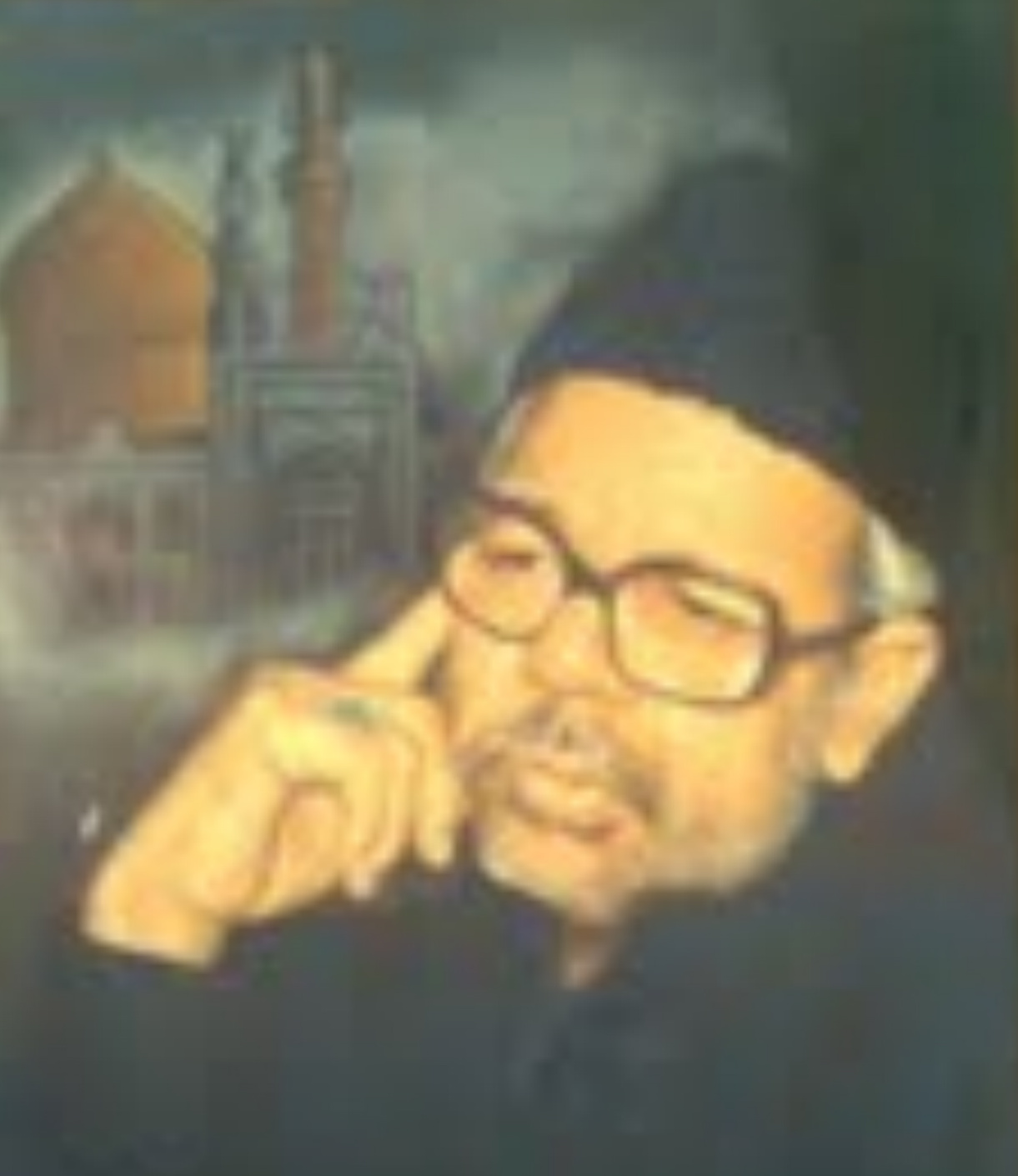
- Tahir Jarwali
- Title: Khatīb-ul Īmān; Shēr-e Hindustān

Personal life
- Born: 31 December 1929 Jarwal, India
- Died: 1 December 1987 (aged 57) Mashhad, Iran
- Cause of death: Cardiac arrest
- Resting place: Imam Reza shrine
- Children: Misam Jarwali; Shozab Jarwali; Ammar Jarwali; Abis Jarwali
- Era: Modern era
- Region: Indian subcontinent
- Main interest(s): Islamic history and principles, Azadari, Tabarra
- Education: University of Lucknow
- Other name: Tahir Jarwali
- Occupation: Lawyer, Barrister
- Relatives: Hamid Husain, Agha Roohi, Abbas Irshad

Religious life
- Religion: Islam
- Lineage: Abaqati family
- Jurisprudence: Ja'fari
- Creed: Twelver Shia Islam

Muslim leader
- Teacher: Saeed-ul-Millat; Naseer-ul-Millat
- Post: General Secretary of All India Shia Conference; Chairman of Shia Council of India; Founding member of the governing board of Shia College, Lucknow

Khateeb-ul-Iman Maulana Syed Muzaffar Husain Rizvi Tahir Jarwali, (31 Dec 1929 – 1 Dec 1987) was a Shia religious leader, social worker and one of the prominent Jarwali Syed and celebrated preacher of late 20th century (1970s and '80s).

== Family ==
He belonged to the family of Syeds of Zaidpur, Barabanki. His great-grandfather moved to Jarwal from Zaidpur and later his grand father and father lived in Jarwal. They belonged to the taluqdar family of Syeds and gained high respect and status in the area. Tahir Jarwali's mother was from the highly respected Shia family of India (Khanwada-e-Sahb-e-Abaqaat) The family of Mir Hamid Hussain (Saheb-e-Abqatul Anwar) & Ayatullah ul Uzma Nasirul Millat. His Mother was the daughter of Nasirul Millat. So he belonged to the family of Nasirul Millat, but, like Agha Roohi, he is not a direct descendant.

== Education ==
For education Tahir moved to Lucknow and gained his studies under the patronage of his maternal uncles Naseerul Millat and Saeedul Millat at their residence Naseer manzil in Nakhas, Lucknow. He was nurtured in a high-profile Shia religious family. He chose to be a lawyer and studied law at University of Lucknow.

== Career ==
He was a barrister.

=== Religious activities ===
During the 1970s and 1980s he organized an important annual three-day national gathering at dargah-e-shaheed-e-salis, Agra, the gathering consisted of one majlis after another from early morning to midnight. He also preached in Hyderabad, India up to late 1980s.

He was the director of the Nasiriyyah Library a scholarly and religious library in Lucknow.

=== Social activities ===
H was General Secretary of All India Shia Conference for some time. Later he had to resign from the post due to factionalism after which he form Shia Council of India under his own chairmanship. He was part of inaugural conference of World Ahlulbayt(as) Islamic League (Wabil), London. He was also founding member of the governing board of Shia College, Lucknow, where he was later (1971) was Honorary Secretary when he reintroduced Statistics as a subject for the students of B.A. and B.Sc.

=== Books ===
He authored following books,

- Majalis - Mawaddat-e-Ahle Bait(a.s.), in Urdu
- Majalis - Najat, in Urdu

== Legacy ==
Shia PG College, Lucknow awards scholarships in his name which is known as Maulana S.M.H. Tahir Jarwali Memorial Scholarship to the best student in each faculty. The Khateebul Iman Hall is too named after him in the same college.

== Sons ==
He had four sons, all being orators,

- Moulana Syed Meesam Kazim Jarwali (d.Jun 2017)
  - Syed Muzaffar Husain Tahir
- Moulana Syed Shozab Kazim Jarwali, erstwhile president of Mazaar-e-Shaheed-e-Saalis.
- Moulana Syed Ammar Kazim Jarwali
- Moulana Syed Abis Kazim Jarwali

== External ==
- ""Tahir Jarwali" lectures @ youtube".
- "Khatībul Īmān, Shēr-i Hindustān Syed Muzaffar Husain Sāhib Rizvi, Tāhir Jarwali". ASHA: Blast From The Past. 16 April 2018.
