= Madiha =

Madiha, also spelled Mediha, Madeeha, or Madhiha, (Arabic: مديحة) is a female given name meaning “praiseworthy.” The origin of the name is Arabic. Notable people with the name are as follows:

== Madiha ==
- Madiha Iftikhar (born 1985), Pakistani actress and model
- Madiha Kamel (1948–1997), Egyptian actress
- Madiha Rashid Al-Madfai (died 2019), Jordanian radio broadcaster
- Madiha Shah (born 1970), Pakistani actress
- Madiha Yousri (1921–2018), Egyptian actress

== Mediha ==
- Mediha Esenel (1914–2005), Turkish sociologist, writer and journalist
- Mediha Musliović (born 1975), Bosnian actress
- Mediha Sultan (1856–1928), Ottoman princess

== Madeeha ==
- Madeeha Gauhar (1956–2018), Pakistani actress

== Madhiha ==
- Madhiha Hassan al-Mosuwi, Iraqi aid worker

== See also ==
- Madiha (disambiguation)
