= Abbas Irshad =

21st-century Indian Shia cleric

Syed Abbas Irshad Naqvi
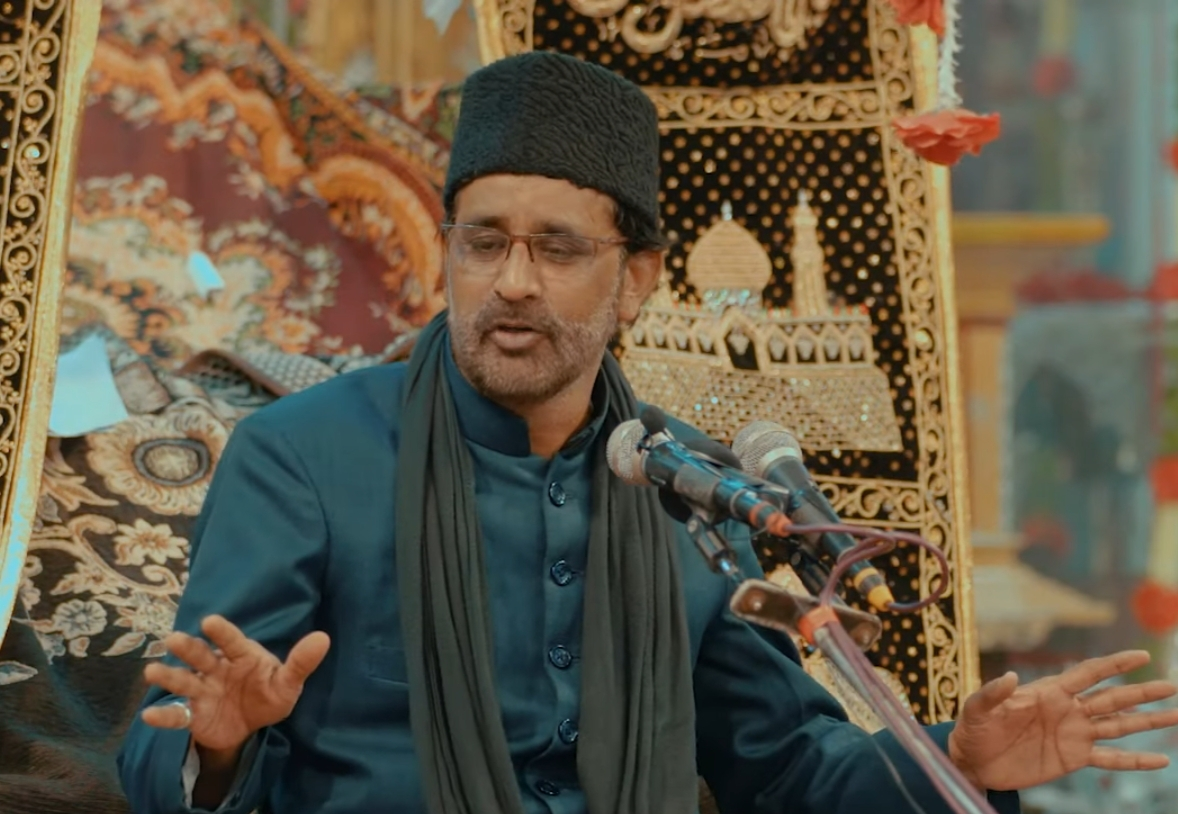
- Maulana Abbas Irshad Naqvi - Majlis 2022 - 15 Safar Amhat Sultanpur 2022
- Title: Khateeb-e Inqilab

Personal life
- Born: Lucknow, India
- Parent: Syed Hasan Irshad Naqvi (father)
- Era: Modern era
- Main interest(s): Azadari, Tabarra Jumlabazi
- Relatives: Tahir Jarwali, Syed Ali Nasir Saeed Abaqati

Religious life
- Religion: Islam
- Jurisprudence: Ja`fari
- Creed: Twelver Shi`a Islam

Muslim leader
- Post: Joint Secretary - All India Shia Personal Law Board

Syed Abbas Irshad Naqvi, known as Khateeb-e-Inqilab, is a Shia orator (Zakir) from Lucknow, Uttar Pradesh, India.

== Family background ==
He is nephew of Tahir Jarwali.

== Religious activities ==
He is a zakir and recites the majalis (religious lectures to commemorate the Martyrdom of Imam Hussain) not only in India but globally, especially in Lucknow, Hyderabad, Kolkata, Bangalore, etc. He is also joint-secretary of All India Shia Personal Law Board. He has written a book on comparative religion titled Aitrafat Sahih Bukhari in Urdu published in 2005.

== Social activities ==
=== Against homosexuality ===
In 2009 he attended in a special discussion organized by City Montessori School to put forth their views on the Delhi High Court's judgement of legalizing homosexual behaviour. The leaders of all religions faiths unanimously criticized the Delhi High Court's judgement and urged the Supreme Court of India, Central Government and all state governments to intervene and review this judgement. While talking to media Abbas Irshad Naqvi said that, "homosexual relations will crush all the relations that we own but we should enjoy it in other way".

=== Against photo shoots at Bara Imambara complex ===
In 2019, he alongside other Shia clerics like Imam-e-Juma of Asafi Mosque Kalbe Jawad, senior cleric Agha Roohi, president of the Shia Moon Committee Saif Abbas, academic and cleric Kalbe Sibtain Noori, spokesperson of All India Shia Personal Law Board Yasoob Abbas, etc. signed the memorandum demanding the maintenance of sanctity and religious fibre of 235-year-old Bara Imambara precincts.

=== Restoration of Imambara Sibtainabad ===
In 2020, he alongside other Shia clerics Kalbe Sadiq, Agha Roohi, Kalbe Jawad, Yasoob Abbas, Syed Saif Abbas Naqvi, etc. requested Archaeological Survey of India for immediate assessment and time-bound restoration of the centrally protected monument Imambara Sibtainabad.

== See also ==
- Islamic scholars
