= Qazi Nurullah Shustari =

Islamic studies scholar

- قاضی نورالله شوشتری
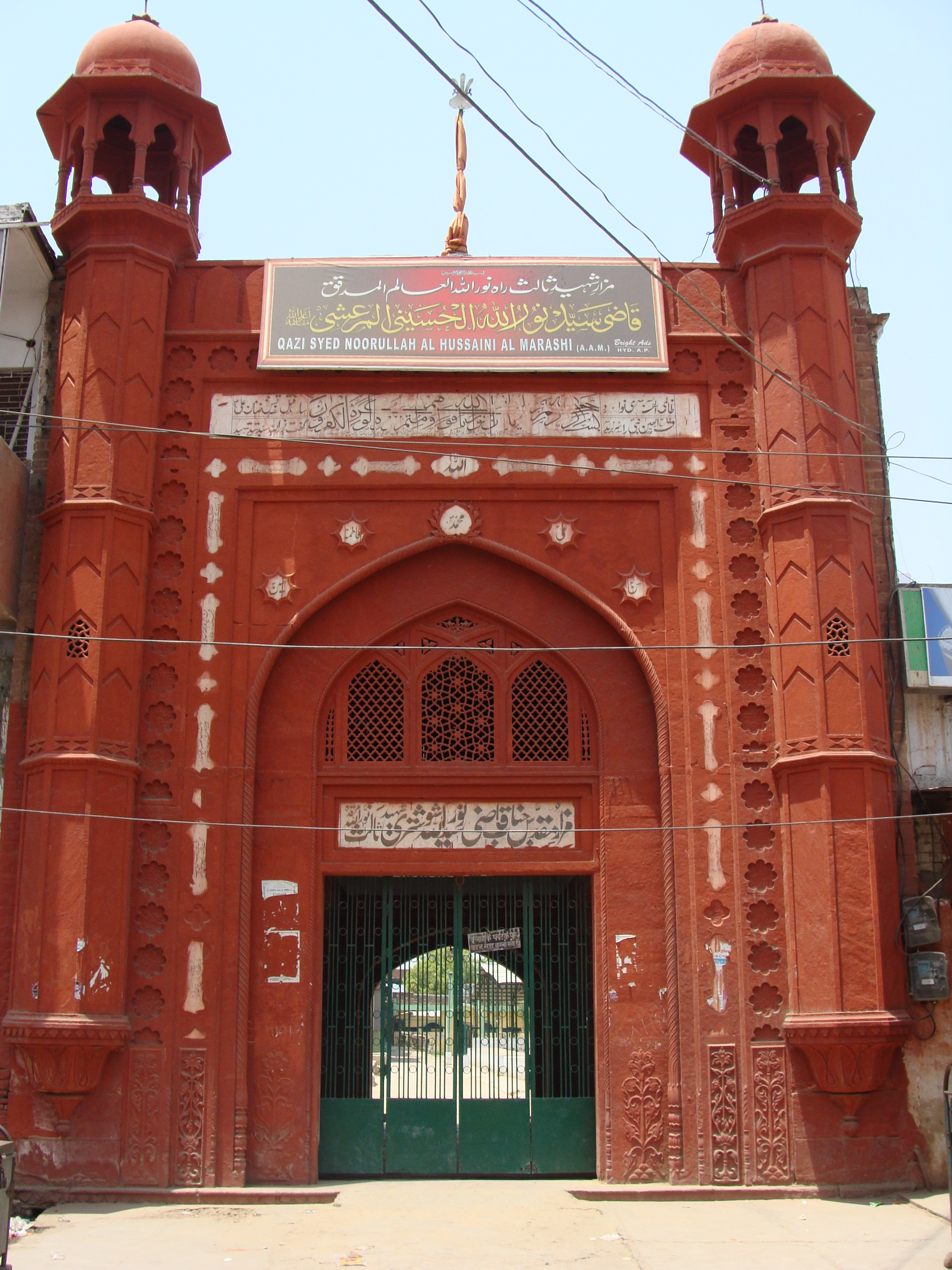
- Entrance to the tomb of Nurullah Shusari, Agra, India

Personal life
- Born: 1549 Shushtar, Safavid Iran
- Died: September 1610 (aged 60–61) Agra, Mughal Empire

Religious life
- Religion: Islam
- Denomination: Shia
- Jurisprudence: Ja'fari
- Creed: Twelver

Sayyid Nurullah ibn Sharif al-Mar'ashi al-Shustari, commonly known as Qazi Nurullah Shushtari (Persian: قاضی نورالله شوشتری; 1549–1610), also known as Shahid-e-Salis (third martyr) was an eminent Shia faqih (jurist) and alim (scholar) of the Mughal period. He also have served as the Qazi-ul-Quzaa of Lahore and Agra during the reign of Akbar.

== Life ==
He was born in 1549 CE (956 AH) at Shushtar, in present-day Khuzestan, south of Iran. He belonged to the Marashi family in Amol. He moved from Mashhad to India, on 1 Shawwal 992/6 October 1584. Although according to some accounts, the year may have been 1587. He was an emissary of Akbar in Kashmir obtained the first census of the areas of Mughal Empire during Akbar's reign.

== Death ==
When Jahangir came to power his position within the court came under threat both from the enemies he had made while settling the disputes in Agra and Kashmir, and from Jahangir's own orthodox stance. Ultimately his own book Ahqaq-ul-haq was presented as evidence against him, he was declared a heretic and sentenced to death due to his religious beliefs. He was executed by flogging in Jumada II 1019/September 1610, at the age of 61.

There is a famous debate shedding light on his assassination in the book Peshawar Nights.

== Legacy ==
=== His works ===
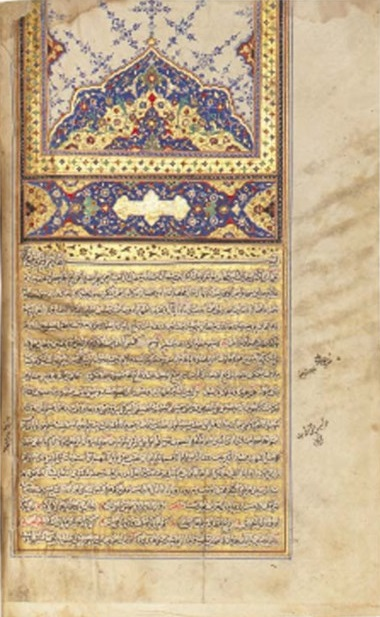
Majalis al-mu'minin (The Assemblies of Believers), Safavid Iran, AH 1043 i.e. 1633-4 AD

Shushtari is considered as one of the scholars who paved the way for the development of Shia Islam. He had excellent literary expertise and had composed literary pieces in Arabic and Persian, writing approximately fifty books and essays in Islamic sciences like kalam, jurisprudence and sirah. Few of them are:

- Ihqaq-ul-Haq (Justification of the Truth), refutes the “Ibtal Nahjal-Batil” by Khwaja Maulana Isfahani and defended the beliefs of Shi’ite faith and answering Sunni objections about it. He was flogged to death on order of emperor Jehangir due to this work.
- Masa’ib-un-Nawasib (Troubles for the Nasibiites), refutation of “Nawaqiz-ul-Rawafiz” by a Sunnite scholar.
- Sawarim-ul-Muhriqa (The Pouring Swords), Refutation of Sawaiq-ul-Muhriqa by the Sunni scholar Ibn Hajar.
- Majalis-ul-Mo’mineen (The Assembly of the faithfuls), gives the description of the religious scholars and the other learned men .
- Risala-i-Jalaliyyah, a treatise dedicated to Mughal emperor Akbar.

Beside the above-mentioned books and treatise he has also several other literary works which include marginal notes, reviews, commentaries, etc. Many of his works with the description of his life have been translated into Arabic, Persian and Urdu.

=== Works about him ===
Following are the works about him,

- Shaheed-e-Salis his biography by Mirza Mohammad Hadi Aziz Lakhnavi (1882–1935).
- Tazkira e Majeed Shaheed E Salis his biography by Syed Sibte Hasan.
- 'Shahīd-i S̲ālis̲ Qāz̤ī Nārullāh Shūstarī: An Historical Figure in Shīite Piety' by Wayne Rollen Husted.
- 'Theological methodology of Judge Noorullah Shoushtari' by Mohammad Remezani and Ali Rabbani.

=== His tomb (mazar) ===
His tomb (mazar) at Agra is a place of pilgrimage and site of annual religious congregation held in commemoration of his martyrdom. The tomb is under waqf deed of 'Haji Dawood Nori Nasir Bagh'. The deed states that a member from the family of Nasirul Millat (Abaqati family) would be patron of the mazar. Now, Maulana Syed Abbas Nasir Saeed Abaqati is president of Anjuman Moinuzzaireen which manages Mazaar-e-Shaheed-e-Saalis while his younger brother Syed Murtaza Nasir Saeed is secretary and his uncles (half-brothers of Agha Roohi) Maulana Syed Sajjad Nasir Saeed Abaqati and Syed Husain Nasir Saeed are patron and Mutawalli' respectively. Earlier notables like Khateeb-ul-Iman' Tahir Jarwali, Maulana Agha Roohi, etc. have been part of its management. Moulana Syed Shozab Kazim Jarwali (son of Khateeb-ul-Iman Tahir Jarwali) too has been its erstwhile president.

Mahdi Khajeh Piri, founder of Noor International Microfilm Center, New Delhi has been involved in the restoration of the tomb.

== Family ==
Shushtari was the son of Sayed Sharif and grandson of Sayed Nurullah. He had five sons. His eldest son Sayed Sharif (1583–1611) was a scholar and authored Hashiya-e-Tafsir-e-Bezavi and Hashiya-e-Qadima. His second son Sayed Muhammad Yusuf was a poet. His third son Alaul Mulk obtained higher education from Shiraz and then returned to India. He took up teaching career at Agra where later he was appointed as tutor to Shah Shuja, the son of Mughal emperor Shah Jahan. He was the author of Anwarul Huda, Al-Siratul Wasil fi Asbatul Wajib, Muhazzabul Mantiq and Firdaus, the history of Shiraz. His fourth son Saiyid Abul Maali (1596–1636) for some time lived in Qutub Shahi kingdom where he translated Masaibun Nawasib from Arabic to Persian. He was the author of Sharh-e Alfiya, Risala fil Adl, Risala Nafi Raut wajib Taala, Tafsir Ala Suratul Akhlas. His fifth son Mir Alaud Daula was a poet.

== See also ==
- The Five Martyrs
- Shahid Awwal
- Shahid Thani
- Shahid Salis
- Shahid Rabay
- Shahid Khamis
- Shaykh Ahmad Sirhindi
- Akbar
- Jehangir
- Nur Jahan
