= Muslim Personal Law Board =

- All India Muslim Personal Law Board
- All India Shia Personal Law Board
