= Madiha (disambiguation) =

Madiha is an Arabic female given name.

Madiha may also refer to:

- Madiha people, commonly called Kulina people, of Brazil and Peru
- Madiha language or Kulina language, spoken by the Kulina
- Madiha Maliha, Pakistani telenovela
