= Al-Sawa'iq al-Muhriqah =

Book by Ibn Hajar al-Haytami

Al-Sawa'iq al-muhriqah is a book written by the Sunni Muslim scholar Ibn Hajar al-Haytami. It covers many areas such as how to send greetings upon the Islamic prophet Muhammad. The book also discusses the place of Shia Islam and attempts to expose and refute their claims. The book has been described as "one of the most devastating polemics ever written against the Shiite doctrine of the imāma and in defence of the first three caliphs."

Two refutations of Ibn Hajar's work have been written:

- "Al-Bahar Al-Murghaqa" by Ahmad bin Muhammad Al-Murtada
- "Al-Sawarim Al-Muharraq" by Qazi Nurullah Shustari

== See also ==
- List of Sunni books
