= Jarwal =

- Town
- Location in Uttar Pradesh, India
- Coordinates: 27.17°N 81.55°E
- Country: India
- State: Uttar Pradesh
- District: Bahraich
- Elevation: 117 m (384 ft)

Population (2011)
  - Total: 19,289

Languages
  - Official: Hindi, Urdu
- Time zone: UTC+5:30 (IST)
- Vehicle registration: UP-40

Jarwal is a town and a nagar panchayat in Bahraich district in the Indian state of Uttar Pradesh. It has an average elevation of 117 metres (383 feet). This place is 20 km away from historical Lodheshwar Mahadev Mandir located in Mahadeva Ram Nagar, that is well described in old mythological stories.

== Demographics ==
As of 2011 census of India Jarwal had a population of 19289. Males constitute 52.54% of the population and females 47.46%. Jarwal has an average literacy rate of 49.83%, lower than the state's rate of 67.68%. Male literacy is 55.09%, and female literacy is 43.94%. In Jarwal, 17.53% of the population is under 6 years of age.

Religions in Jarwal
Religion	Percent
Hindus	20.02%
Muslims	79.58%
Jains	0.7%
Others†	0.3%
Distribution of religions †Includes Sikhs (0.2%), Buddhists (<0.2%).

Jarwal Road railway station is the nearest railway track and it is 9 km from Jarwal Kasba.

== History ==
The Sayyids of Jarwal, along with those of Kintoor and Zaidpur, were well known Taluqadars (feudal lords) of Awadh province.

The Sayyids of Jarwal were descended from one Abu Talib, who was originally from Iran. During Genghis Khan's invasion, Abu Talib fled with his family, first to Khorasan and then to Lahore. In 1286, his son Aziz ud-Din went to Delhi, and his own son Ala ud-Din eventually settled in Bado Sarai, in Barabanki district. Ala ud-Din had two sons: Jalal ud-Din and Jamal ud-Din. Jalal ud-Din incurred the ire of the Delhi sultan Ghiyath ud-Din Tughluq, who had him executed. Ghiyath ud-Din later tried to make amends to Jamal ud-Din by granting him 25,000 bighas of land, revenue-free, in Barhauli, on the south bank of the Gogra, and another 25,000 in Jarauli on the north bank.

While Jamal ud-Din had no trouble establishing himself in Barhauli, he faced stiff resistance from Raja Chhatarsal, the Bhar ruler of Jarauli, and died without taking control of the fort of Jarauli. His son, Sayyid Zakariyya, finally gained control of the fort in 1340, probably because of military support from Muhammad bin Tughluq, who is known to have been in the Bahraich area during that year.

In 1800 the Jarwal Sayyids, some of them Shi‘is, displaced the Ansari Shaykhs and came to hold 276 out of 365 villages in the parganah, although their holdings thereafter declined rapidly to (a still formidable) 76 villages in 1877. Khateeb-ul-Iman Maulana Syed Muzaffar Husain Rizvi Tahir Jarwali (1932-Dec 1987) a Shia religious leader was one of the prominent Jarwali Sayyid and celebrated preacher of late 20th century (1970s & 80s), he was also General Secretary of All India Shia Conference for some time.
