= Noor International Microfilm Center =

Noor International Microfilm Center مرکز بین المللی میکرو فیلم نور
- Founded: 1985
- Founder: Dr. Mahdi Khajeh Piri
- Location: New Delhi, India
- Services: Repairing, Restoration and Publishing of Manuscripts
- Website: indianislamicmanuscript.com

Noor International Microfilm Center is situated in the Culture House of the Islamic Republic of Iran, New Delhi and is occupied in carrying out repair work and preparing microfilm, photographing of the old manuscripts and printing them. This center was established in the year 1985 as a result of efforts made by Dr. Mahdi Khajeh Piri. The inception of educational and cultural activities of this center coincided with the 400th death anniversary of Allamah Qazi Nurullah Shustari (died 1409 A.H). He was an Iranian Mohadis, orator, literary person and poet in India. The Noor international Microfilm Center was named after this great learned man in recognition to his service.

== Activities ==
The Noor Center Was founded with an objective to protect and publish the Islamic Iranian heritage. Among these activities of this center is to prepare photographs and microfilm of more than sixty thousand Persian, Arabic and Urdu manuscripts of Indian Libraries like (Maulana Azad Library, Lucknow Library, Libraries of Gujarat etc.). Likewise, the photographic collection of manuscripts and microfilm available in the summary and detailed catalogue has been prepared in Persian, Arabic, English and Urdu. Likewise, this center has created a new and completely exclusive method to repair and protect the manuscripts through herbal treatment among them the manuscripts of Kulliyat Saadi and other oldest copy of Nahj al-Balagha can be mentioned.

So far more than two hundred exquisite manuscripts of Islamic books have been printed and circulated by this center with the same characteristics of the original copies. This kind of circulation has been for the first time designed and implemented in this center.

== Aims and objectives ==
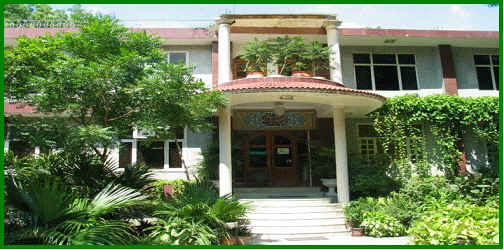
The Library of Noor International Microfilm Center

Noor International Microfilm Center started its function with the following aims and objects:

- Repairing, pesting and printing of the duplicate copy of same manuscripts through the new methods and preparing microfilms, photographs, publishing and printing of the ancient manuscripts
- Acquainting, introducing and preserving the common cultural heritage Iran and India under the frame work of common Islamic values.
- Studies and research work with the purpose of reviving and introducing work of the scholars of both the nations.
- Establishing relations with the research scholars and giving them all possible facilities in their studies regarding their work in the field of common cultural relations between India and Iran.
- Establishing contacts with the libraries and centers of oriental studies India with the libraries, centers of oriental studies and institutes of Islam studies in Iran, with the purpose of achieving better acquaintance, mutual cooperation in scientific and cultural areas.

== Publications ==
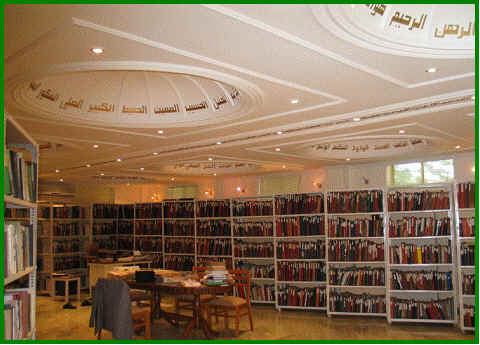
The Library of Noor International Microfilm Center

- Molod Kabaa
- Khasaes Murtazavi
- Al Maqsad ul jali fi Masnad ul Ali
- Manaqib ul Murtaza min Mawahi bul Mustafa
- List of microfilm Persian, Arabic, Manuscripts, Volume 8 (Library of Raja Mahmudabad)
- List of microfilm Persian, Arabic, Manuscripts, Volume 7 (Library of Aiwan-e-Ghalib)
- List of microfilm Persian, Arabic, Manuscripts, Volume 6 (Library of Dr. Zakir Hussain, Jamia Millia Islamia)
- List of microfilm Persian, Arabic, Manuscripts, Volume 5 (Library of Anjuman-i Taraqqi-i Urdu)
- List of microfilm Persian, Arabic, Manuscripts, Volume 4 (Library of Gujarat)
- List of microfilm Persian, Arabic, Manuscripts, Volume 3 (Library of Hakim Syed Zillur Rahman).

== Exhibitions and seminars ==
- Allamah Qazi Nurullah Shustari (Agra)
- Salarjang Exhibition (Hyderabad)
- Patna Exhibition (Bihar)
- Maulana Azad Exhibition (Hyderabad)
- National Archives of India Exhibition
- Darul Hadith Exhibition (Qom, Iran)
- Exhibition on reproducing same copies of documents and manuscripts in National Archives of India (New Delhi).
