= Hadidi (tribe) =

Arab tribe

Al-Hadidi, Hadidi, or Hadidiyin (Arabic: الحديدي) is an Arab Mosowi tribe. This tribe is primarily located in Syria. and Iraq

== Influence ==
Most members of Al-Hadidi tribe are highly educated and have had a great influence on the cultural and social movement in their city and society. The tribe is of Muslim origins and are descendant of the prophet Mohammad. The family has a great number of scholars, including published PhD holders, design (UIUX) and particularly physicians who practice medicine.
