= Kazmi =

Kazemi, Kazimi, Kazmi, or al-Kadhimi (Arabic: الكاظمي al-Kadhimi; Persian: کاظمی) is a surname found most commonly in Iran, Syria, Iraq, Afghanistan, Pakistan and India. The surname is conventionally used by people who trace their patrilineal descent from Imam Musa al-Kazim, a Sayyid (descendant of Muhammad). Kazmi people are said to descend from Muhammad through his daughter Fatima. Musa al-Kadhim is revered as the seventh successor of Muhammad in Shia Islam i.e., he is the seventh Imam in the Hadith of the twelve successors.

The terms Musavi and Kazmi can be used interchangeably (since both have been derived from Imam Musa al-Kazim).

== Notable people with this surname ==
=== Kazmi ===
- Ahmad Saeed Kazmi (1913–1986), Sufi scholar from Multan, Pakistan
- Arman Kazmi, UC Berkeley scholar
- Iqbal Kazmi, Pakistani human rights activist and journalist
- Nasir Kazmi, Urdu poet from Pakistan
- Nikhat Kazmi, film critic from India
- Pratima Kazmi, Indian television actress
- Rahat Kazmi, Pakistani television actor, talk-show anchor and academic
- Shah Abdul Latif Kazmi (1617–1705), known as Bari Imam, Sufi poet and philosopher

=== Kazemi ===
- Alireza Kazemi (born 1965), Iranian politician
- Arastoo Kazemi (1927 - 2011), Iranian counsel to the democratic government of Dr. Mosaddegh
- Arsalan Kazemi, Iranian basketball player
- Elham Kazemi, Iranian–American mathematics educator
- Farhad Kazemi, Iranian football manager
- Hadi Kazemi, Iranian actor
- Hossein Kazemi (born 1979), Iranian footballer
- Kian Kazemi (born 1986) Iranian-Filipino actor and businessman
- Mohammad Kazemi (1961–2025), Iranian intelligence officer and brigadier general
- Saber Kazemi (1998–2025), Iranian volleyball player
- Sahel Kazemi (died 2009), murderer of retired NFL football star Steve McNair
- Sayed Mustafa Kazemi (1962–2007), Afghan politician
- Zahra Kazemi (1949–2003), Iranian-Canadian journalist
- Zhaleh Kazemi (1944–2005), Iranian painter and news anchor

=== Kazimi ===
- Ali Kazimi (born 1961), Canadian filmmaker, media artist and writer

=== Kadhimi ===
- Mustafa Al-Kadhimi, Prime Minister of Iraq since 2020

== Fictional characters ==
- Carmel Kazemi, EastEnders
- Darius Kazemi, EastEnders
- Kush Kazemi, EastEnders
- Shakil Kazemi, EastEnders
- Umar Kazemi, EastEnders
