= Mahdi Khajeh Piri =

Founder of Noor International Microfilm Center, New Delhi

Mehdi Khajeh Piri
- مهدی خواجه پیری
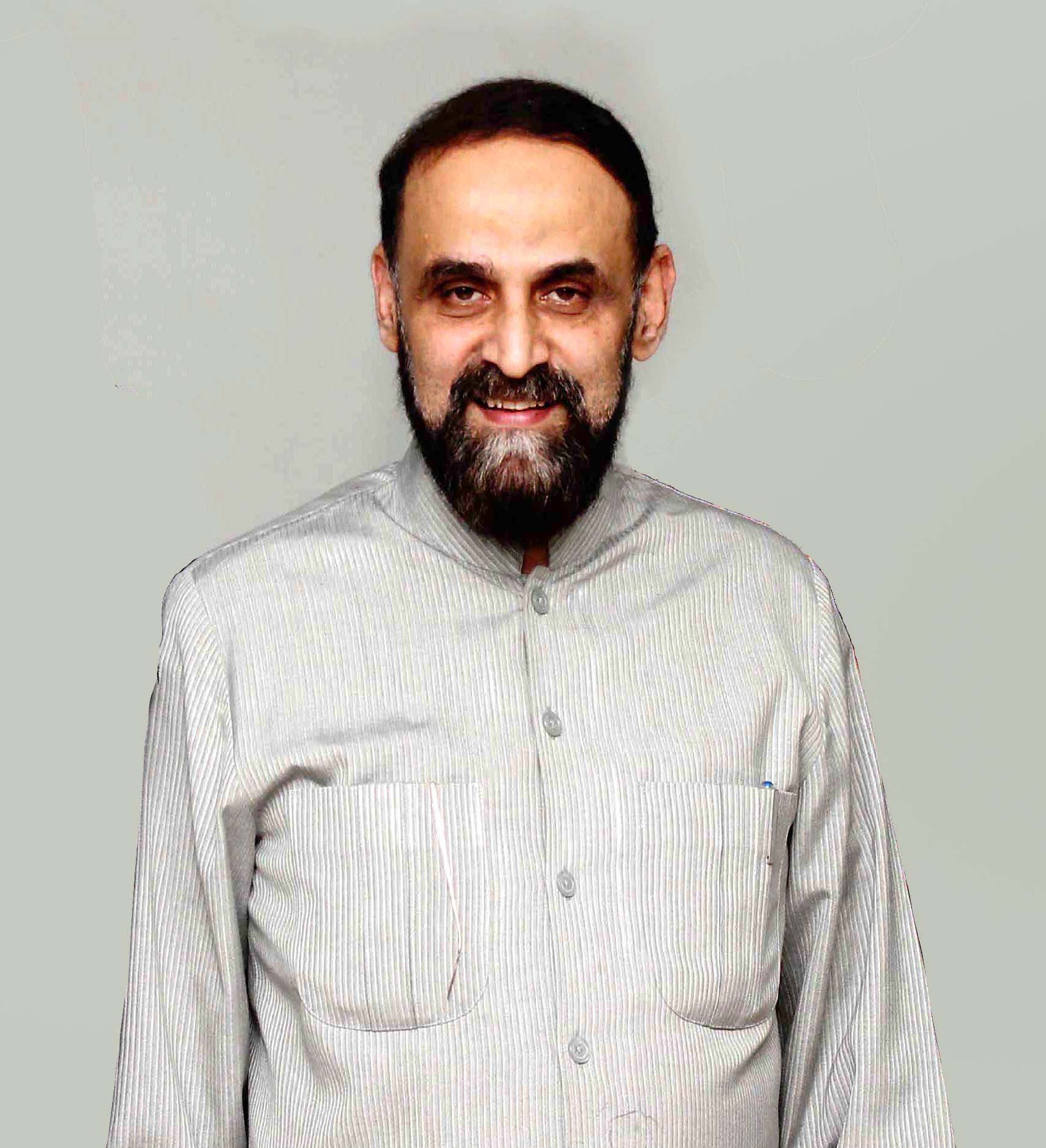
- Mehdi khajeh piri in Hyderabad (India)
- Born: 29 April 1955 (age 71); Tehran, Iran
- Website: official website

Mehdi Khajeh Piri (Persian: مهدی خواجه پیری), is the founder of Noor International Microfilm Center, New Delhi and innovative of new methods of repair, pest and print of duplicate copy of same manuscripts which is an innovative move in preserving ancient texts.

He was born in 1955 in a religious family in neighborhood of (Imamzadeh) Yahya shrine in Tehran. He has spent about 35 years of his life in book revival in India, during this period of time he got familiar with numerous cultures of the subcontinent and mastered in Hindi, English and Arabic languages.

== Educational qualification ==
He has completed religious studies at Ahmad Mojtahedi Tehrani School and has the honor of being student of great scholars such as Sheikh Jaffar Khandaq Abadi, Mirza Ali Aqa Seidiyan and Mr. Jawadi. Then he went to Qom for further studies. From that time he had a great interest in collecting manuscripts. He had traveled to India to visit Islamic libraries of the country in 1978 and settled down there. While being benefited by masters like Allamah Sa’adat Hussain Khan, Syed Ali Razvi (head of Jamia Sultania) and Allama Vasi Muhammad (head of Madrasa Alwaezin), he engaged with teaching in Sultaniaya School and had completed his PhD in History of Arab culture and civilization from university of Lucknow and during same period he was honored with the degree of excellence "Afzaliyat status" from Sunni sect School of Ajmal Al-Olum.

== Activities ==
He has established center of Persian studies together with the help of Syed Ahmad Hussaini in culture house of Islamic republic of Iran in 1983 and appointed as head of same centre. During these years he published list of Arabic and Persian manuscripts of Darul Uloom Nadwatul Ulama library of Lucknow in two volumes, list of Bhopal and Esha’at-e- Kashmir publications, guardians of Persian language in India and library list of Raja Mahmudabad .

On the order of Ayatollah Syed Ali Khamenei, he established the Noor International Microfilm Center, in 1995.

During these 30 years he could prepare the microfilm and picture of more than 60 thousand manuscripts along with 20 thousand lithography and lead print books available in different libraries and cultural, educational and research centers of India. Noor Microfilm center in addition to preparing microfilm, established different sections of cataloguing, restoration, treating and reproducing the same copies in a unique method. Supervision of sixty two catalogs of manuscripts of Indian libraries in Persian, Arabic, Urdu and English languages. Preparation of 27 detailed catalogues of manuscripts of libraries like Aligarh Muslim University, Dargah Pir Mohammad Shah, Dargah Aulia Chishtia, Dargah Aulia Mehdaviya, Asifiah library and library of Hyderabad Urdu literature Department in Persian language and translation of all these catalogues into English language and preparation of eight catalogues of Arabic manuscripts of Hyderabad Asefiyah Library and libraries of Jamia Millia Islamia New Delhi and Jamia Hamdard can be counted among some of his great activities.

== New printing method ==
By developing the new methods of repairing, treating and reproducing the same copies of manuscripts, he created a new device revitalise the old texts. So far more than two hundred titles have been reproduced among which the reproduction and repairing of the world's oldest manuscripts of Nahj al-Balagha and the repair of seven hundred old manuscript of Kuliyat [[Saadi Shirazi|Saadi]] can be named.

== Books ==
The following books and essays are by him:

- Allamah Mir Hamid Hussain
- History of Shiaism in India
- Islamic stone carving of Hyderabad and Golkonda

== Essays ==
- Persian news writing in India and England
- Raza Library Rampur .

== Tomb of Qazi Nurullah Shustari ==
Among other activities of Khajeh Piri is the restoration of tomb of Qazi Nurullah Shustari in the city of Agra.

== Link ==
- Web Site Of Noor international Microfilm center
- Unveiling Of 8 Books, Mahdi Khajeh Piri in the presence of the Vice President 1 on YouTube
- Unveiling Of 8 Books, Mahdi Khajeh Piri in the presence of the Vice President 2 on YouTube
- Unveiling Of 8 Books, Mahdi Khajeh Piri in the presence of the Vice President 3 on YouTube
- Photo exhibition manuscript refurbished Fort William College in India on YouTube
