= Madhe Sahaba Agitation =

Madhe Sahaba Agitation in Lucknow

- Lucknow (India)
- Location: Lucknow, Uttar Pradesh, India
- Target: Azadari in Lucknow
- Attack type: Religious violence
- Weapons: Stones, Bricks, Sticks
- Perpetrator: Deobandi madrassa Dar ul Mubalaghin of Lucknow
- Motive: Sectarianism

The Madhe Sahaba Agitation was a civil disobedience movement launched by the Deobandi Muslims of Lucknow in the first half of the twentieth century. The movement aimed to counter the commemoration of the tragedy of Karbala during Muharram. It led to a widespread Shia–Sunni conflict between 1906 and 1909 and later turned violent between 1936 and 1939. The conflict eventually spread to other parts of British India.

== Background ==
During Medieval India, both Shiites and Sunnis commemorated Muharram together. Pelsaert provides an account of the commemoration of Muharram during Jahangir's reign as follows:

"In commemoration of this tragedy, they wail all night for a period of ten days. The women recite lamentations and display grief. The men carry two decorated coffins on the main roads of the city with many lamps. Large crowds attend these ceremonies, with great cries of mourning and noise. The chief event is on the last night, when it seems as if a Pharoah had killed all the infants in one night. The outcry lasts till the first quarter of the day".

Until the end of the sixteenth century AD, only two anti-Shia books had been written in India: Minhaj al-Din by Makhdoom-ul-Mulk Mullah Abdullah Sultanpuri and Radd-e Rawafiz by Shaikh Ahmad Sirhindi. Sirhindi approvingly quoted a group of Transoxianan ulema:

"Since the Shia permit cursing Abu Bakr, Umar, Uthman and one of the chaste wives (of the Prophet), which in itself constitutes infedality, it is incumbent upon the Muslim ruler, nay upon all people, in compliance with the command of the Omniscient King (Allah), to kill them and to oppress them in order to elevate the true religion. It is permissible to destroy their buildings and to seize their property and belongings."

He expressed his hatred towards the Shias in his letters as well. According to him, the worst distorters of the faith "are those who bear malice against the companions of Prophet Muhammad. God has called them Kafirs in the Quran." In a letter to Sheikh Farid, he stated that showing respect to the distorters of faith (ahl-e-Bidʻah) amounted to the destruction of Islam. However, there is evidence that Sirhindi later changed his views regarding the Shias.

As far as armed violence is concerned, the medieval period offers only a few examples of Shias being killed for their beliefs. The most notable incidents include the killing of Abdullah Shah Ghazi in 769 AD, the destruction of Multan in 1005 AD, the persecution of Shias at the hands of Sultan Feroz Shah (1351–1388 AD), and the targeted killing of Mullah Ahmad Thathavi in 1589 AD. However, the killer of Mullah Ahmad Thathavi was brought to justice by Emperor Akbar. The death of Syed Nurullah Shushtari appears to have been politically motivated. The region of Srinagar in Kashmir is an exception in the Middle Ages, having witnessed ten bloody Taraaj-e-Shia campaigns.

Troubles between the Shias and Sunnis in Lucknow were initiated by Syed Ahmad Barelvi during his visits to towns in Awadh, Bihar, and Bengal between 1818 and 1820, where he preached his radical ideas. He repeatedly destroyed ta'ziyas, an act that led to subsequent riots and chaos. Barbara Metcalf offers the following explanation for his anti-Shi'ism:

"Sayyid Ahmad himself is said, no doubt with considerable exaggeration, to have torn down thousands of imambaras, the building that house the ta'ziyahs".

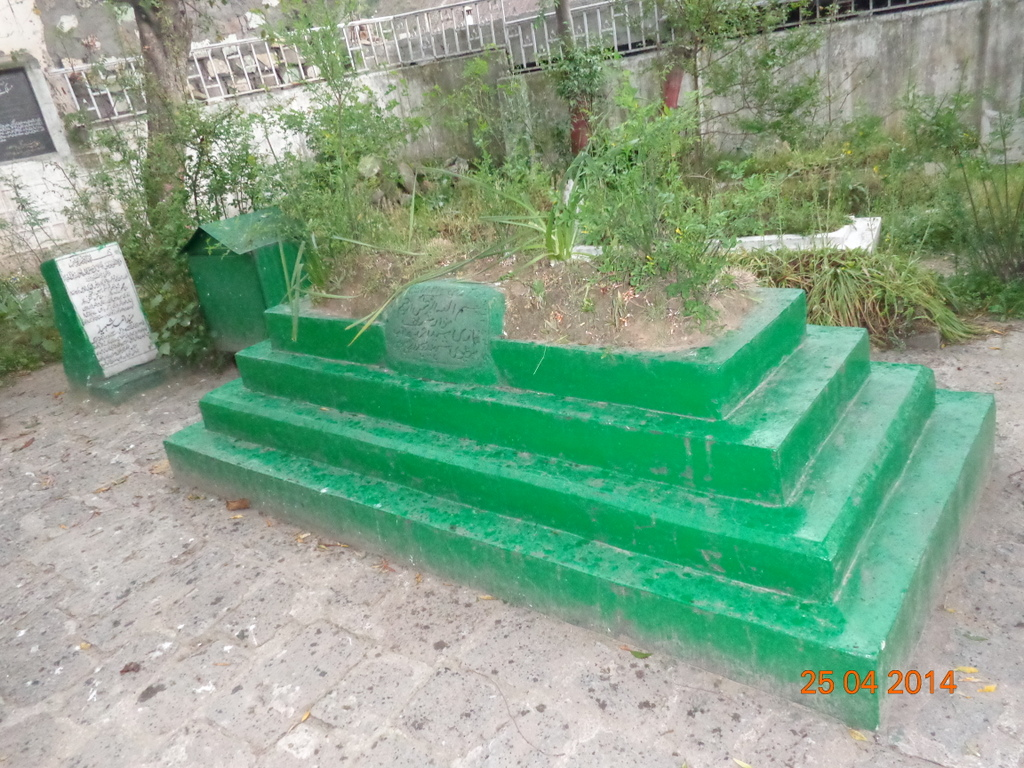
Grave of Syed Ahmad Barelvi in Balakot

A second category of abuses that Syed Ahmad attributed to Shi’i influence was related to the practice of keeping ta’ziyahs. He particularly urged Muslims to abandon this practice, including the carrying of replicas of the tombs of the martyrs of Karbala in processions during the mourning ceremonies of Muharram. Muhammad Isma’il wrote:

"A true believer should regard the act of breaking a tazia by force as equally virtuous as destroying idols. If he cannot break them himself, he should order others to do so. If even that is beyond his power, he should at least detest and abhor them with his whole heart and soul."

This legacy was carried forward by his followers, who later split into two new sects, namely the Deobandis and the Ahle Hadith. However, until the end of the nineteenth century, anti-Shia sentiment was marginal, and the followers of Syed Ahmad Barelvi were few in number. Mushirul Hasan says:

"Shia-Sunni relations were not structured around sectarian lines. Some people nursed sectarian prejudices, but most consciously resisted attempts to create fissures in the broadly unified and consensual model of social and cultural living. Regardless of the polemics of the Ulama and the itinerant preachers, bonds of friendship and understanding remained intact because Shias and Sunnis of all classes shared a language, literature and a cultural heritage. That is probably why Sharar observed, though in an exaggerated vein, that no one in Lucknow ever noticed who was a Sunni and who a Shia".

However, as modern printing technology, political reforms, and fast travel brought about social changes, religious identities became politically relevant, and religious leaders began to segregate communities to strengthen their economic and political support base. In the 1880s and 1890s, Lucknow witnessed clashes between Shias and Sunnis.

== 1908 Riots and Piggot Committee ==
By the early 1900s, the majority of Sunnis still observed Muharram. However, modern lifestyles led to Muharram becoming both a feast and a battleground. As noted in the government gazette:

"Shops and booths came to be set up and there were amusements such as swings and merry go rounds. It appears further that women of the town had begun not only to frequent the route of the tazias but to set up tents on the fair ground where they received visitors"

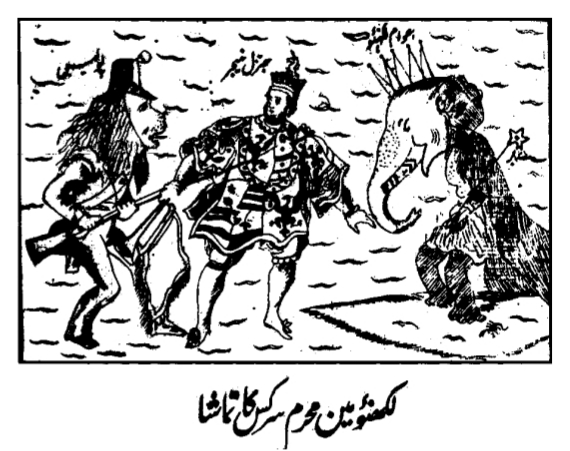
Cartoon appearing in Lucknow Punch, an Urdu satirical magazine mocking riots during Muharram 1908.

A Deobandi cleric, Abdul Shakoor Lakhnavi, sought to replace mourning with the celebration of Imam Hussain's moral victory over Yazid. He urged Sunnis to wear red or yellow attire instead of black and to carry a decorated Charyari flag in place of the traditional black flag. Rather than honouring the Sahaba on their birthdays, he began organising public gatherings under the banner of Madhe Sahaba (Praise of the Companions) during Muharram. In these meetings, he would discuss the lives of companions whom the Shias did not revere and criticise Shia beliefs.

Shias submitted a complaint to the office of the Lucknow District Magistrate, requesting action against activities that went against the traditional character of Muharram. The district administration accepted their demands and imposed stringent regulations on the Ashura procession of 1906. However, Sunnis objected to these new rules. In response, the administration designated a separate site at Nishat Ganj for Sunnis to bury their taziyah, which later became known as Karbala Phool Katora.

Despite this arrangement, Sunnis continued their new practice of celebrating the Sahaba during Muharram. In Sunni processions, Charyari poems and couplets were recited, some of which were considered objectionable as they contained derogatory remarks against Shias and their beliefs, provoking resentment among the Shias. In retaliation, Shias recited Tabarra. This escalating tension led to serious riots in 1907 and 1908.

Following these disturbances, a four-member committee was formed under the chairmanship of Justice T. C. Piggot, an ICS officer and a judge of the High Court, to investigate the matter. The committee concluded that "the attempt to transform the tazia processions in honour of the first four Caliphs was an innovation." It recommended a general prohibition on the organised recitation of Madhe Sahaba verses on three specific days: Ashura (the tenth day of Muharram), Chehlum (the fortieth day after Ashura), and the twenty-first day of Ramzan. The government accepted the committee’s report and implemented its recommendations.

== Madhe Sahaba Agitation of 1930s ==
After the decline of the Khilafat Movement in the 1920s, the clergy lost its influence over the public, and many Muslims began following modern leaders like Muhammad Ali Jinnah. In an effort to remain politically relevant, the politically ambitious Deobandi clergy established a militant organisation, Majlis-i-Ahrar-i-Islam, in 1931. This organisation is considered a predecessor of Sipah-e-Sahaba Pakistan (SSP).

Initially, Majlis-i-Ahrar-i-Islam agitated against the Ahmadis in Kashmir, but they soon sought another cause. An opportunity arose through Molana Abdul Shakoor Lakhnavi, who had established a seminary, Dar-ul-Mubalaghin, in Lucknow in 1931, strategically located on the route of the annual Shia procession. Molana Abdul Shakoor wrote numerous books and pamphlets and engaged in debates with Shia clerics. With the increased availability of paper, his writings spread across the subcontinent, leading to incidents of violence, though on a smaller scale compared to the situation in Uttar Pradesh. Dhulipala says:

"The problem broke out with renewed vigour in 1936 on Ashura day when two Sunnis disobeyed orders and publicly recited Charyari in the city centre of Lucknow. They were arrested and prosecuted, but then on Chhelum day more Sunnis took part in reciting Charyari and fourteen were arrested. This led to a new agitation by the Lucknow Sunnis in favour of reciting these verses publicly, which came to be known as Madhe Sahaba".

The government appointed the Allsop Committee, which upheld the decision of the Piggott Committee. The Allsop Committee's report was published in March 1938 but was rejected by the Deobandi ulema. Mushirul Hasan says:

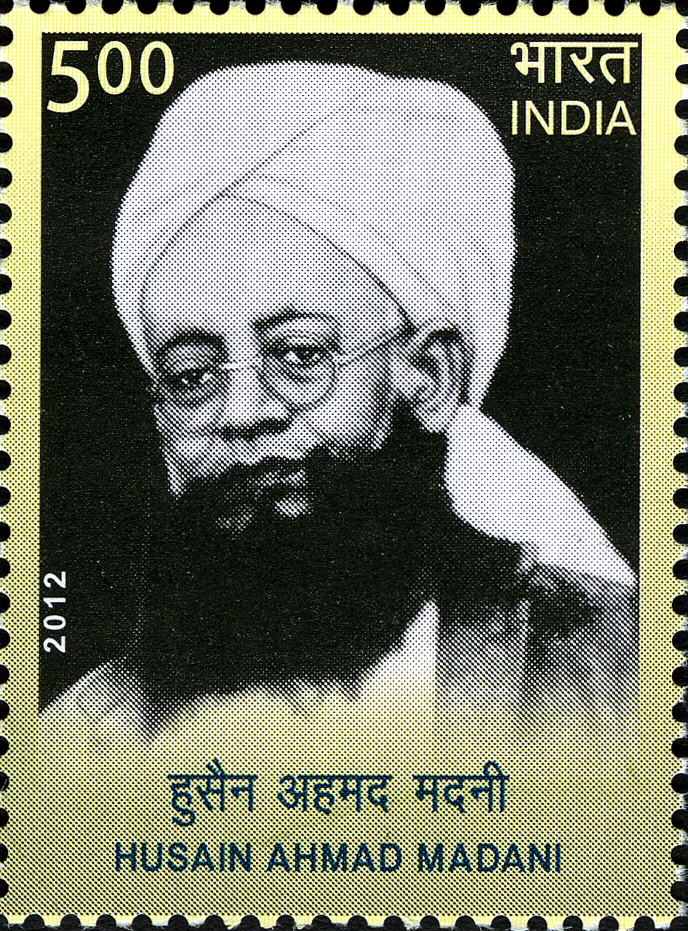
Husain Ahmad Madani

"It turned violent in May–June 1937, when frenzied mobs in Lucknow and Ghazipur went on a rampage. Trouble in Ghazipur was instigated by a party of Sunnis from Jaunpur. Enraged mobs burnt and looted property. They killed at will. The summer of discontent rumbled on as sectarian strife, hitherto dormant, turned into a common occurrence in the daily lives of Lucknawis. There was more trouble during the next two years, fuelled by a government-appointed committee's ruling against Madh-e Sahaba in Lucknow. All hell broke loose. Husain Ahmad Madani (1879–1957), principal of the renowned seminary at Deoband along with other Jam'iyat al-'Ulama' leaders, jumped into the fray. He advocated civil disobedience. Thousands paid heed to his call and courted arrest. Though a fervent advocate of secular nationalism and a principled critic of the «two-nation theory», he stirred sectarian passions unabashedly. He spoke at a public meeting in Lucknow on 17 March 1938 sharing the platform with the firebrand head of the Dar al-Muballighin, Maulvi 'Abdul Shakoor, and Maulana Zafarul Mulk, chief exponent of Madh-e Sahaba in Lucknow".

In April 1938, when the Chehlum procession passed in front of the newly built Madrasa Dar-ul-Mubalaghin, bricks were thrown at it from the rooftop, resulting in the deaths of ten Shias and injuries to dozens of others. With the rise of the modern press and faster communication, the conflict quickly spread to other cities. By 1940, tensions had escalated further, and a bomb was thrown at a procession in Delhi. J. N. Hollister reports on the security situation during Muharram in 1940:

"Conflicts between Sunnis and Shias at Muharram are not infrequent. Processions in the cities are accompanied by police along fixed lines of March. The following quotations from a single newspaper are not usual. They indicate what might happen if government did not keep the situation under control:

'adequate measures avert incidents', 'Muharram passed off peacefully', 'All shops remained closed in... in order to avoid incidents', 'Several women offered satyagraha in front of the final procession... about twenty miles from Allahabad. They object to the passing of the procession through their fields', 'the police took great precautions to prevent a breach of the peace', 'as a sequel to the cane charge by the police on a Mehndi procession the Moslems... did not celebrate the Muharram today. No ta’zia processions were taken out... Business was transacted as usual in the Hindu localities', 'Bomb thrown on procession'.

Not all of these disturbances spring from sectarian differences, but those differences actuate many fracases. Birdwood says that, in Bombay, where the first four days of Muharram are likely to be devoted to visiting each other's tabut khanas, women and children as well as men are admitted, and members of other communities – only the Sunnies are denied 'simply as a police precaution'".

Justice Munir writes in his report:

"How they attempted to defeat the Muslim League with Islam as their weapon will be apparent from some utterances of Maulana Mazhar Ali Azhar, the Ahrar leader, to whom is ascribed the couplet in which the Quaid-i-Azam was called kafir-i-azam. This gentleman is a Shia, but madh-i-sahaba with him is dearer than life, and during the days of Shia-Sunni riots in Lucknow both he and his son adopted this slogan which rouses the fire of every Shia and went from Lahore to Lucknow to fan the Shia-Sunni fire. Speaking outside Bhati Gate at a public meeting of the Ahrar, he said that he had, for the preceding two or three months, been asking the Muslim League whether the names of sahaba-i-karam would be revered in Pakistan, but had received no reply. He alleged that in the Congress-governed Provinces where Government was still with the British and the League had no power, the Leaguers were not permitting the sahaba to be named with reverence and asked whether, if power passed to the League; the state of affairs would be the same as in Lucknow and other Provinces where Muslims were in a majority and madh-i- sahaba would be an offence. Proceeding, he inquired if words of praise for Hazrat Abu Bakr, Hazrat Umar and Hazrat Usman could not be uttered in Lucknow and Mahmudabad, what would be the condition in League's Pakistan and what interest the Musalmans could have in such Pakistan (vide 'Shahbaz' of 20th November 1945)? In its issue of 2nd November 1945, the 'Nawa-i-Waqt' published a letter written by this very gentleman to another Ahrar leader. As the genuineness of this letter was questioned, we examined Maulana Mazhar Ali Azhar about it. He says that he does not definitely remember having written it but since this letter was published in one of the prominent papers of Lahore and was not contradicted by him, we have no hesitation in holding that the Maulana did write this letter. It is impossible that the Maulana, a renowned leader as he was in those days, should not have been aware of the publication of this letter, and, if he failed to contradict it, the only inference can be that the 'Nawa-i-Waqt' was in possession of the original letter, the authorship of which, in case the matter came to proof, could have conclusively been proved. The subject-matter of this letter is again madh-i- sahaba and we may repeat that the Maulana himself is a Shia. In this letter the Maulana says that the weapon of madh-i-sahaba could effectively be used against the League and that both the League and the Government will have to surrender over this issue whatever might, be the result of the elections. This conduct of the Maulana shows quite clearly how the Ahrar and other parties can conveniently exploit religion for their political ends. In this connection we may also mention a similar effort made by the Muslim League itself in 1946 to have pirs and masha'ikh, who command considerable followings, on its side in the struggle for the establishment of Pakistan."

== Legacy ==
On 3 September 1939, British Prime Minister Neville Chamberlain declared war on Germany. Shortly thereafter, Viceroy Lord Linlithgow announced that India, too, was at war with Germany. In 1939, Congress leaders resigned from all British Indian government to which they had been elected. By the 1940s, Muhammad Ali Jinnah had emerged as the leader of Indian Muslims and was popularly known as Quaid-e-Azam (‘Great Leader’). These political developments, along with debates over the status of Muslims in a future independent India, created an environment that compelled Muslims to set aside their sectarian disputes and focus on broader political issues.

In 1944, Deobandi clerics established a separate organisation under the name Tanzim-i-Ahle Sunnat, specifically to attack Shia beliefs and practices while keeping the mainstream Deobandi leadership free from accusations of communalism. This allowed them to present themselves as secular nationalists.

After the partition of India in 1947, many students of Molana Abdul Shakoor Lakhnavi and Molana Hussain Ahmad Madani migrated to Pakistan, where they either established seminaries or became part of Tanzim-e-Ahle Sunnat or Jamiat Ulema-i-Islam (JUI). They travelled extensively across the country, called for attacks on Shia processions, and authored books and tracts opposing Shia beliefs. Among them were Molana Noorul Hasan Bukhari, Molana Dost Muhammad Qureshi, Molana Abdus Sattar Taunsavi, Molana Mufti Mahmood, Molana Abdul Haq Haqqani, and Molana Sarfaraz Gakharvi.

As early as 1949, a Muharram procession was attacked in Narowal. In the 1951 Punjab Assembly elections, voting for Shia candidates was declared prohibited, and they were labelled as infidels. In 1955, mourning processions were attacked at 25 locations across Punjab. That same year, a Balti imambargah in Karachi was attacked by a Deobandi mob, leaving twelve people severely injured.

In 1957, three mourners were killed when a Muharram procession was attacked in Sitpur village of Muzaffargarh district. In the same year, one person was killed and three others were seriously injured when bricks and stones were thrown at a mourning procession in Ahmadpur Sharqi. In June 1958, Agha Mohsin, a prominent Shia orator, was assassinated in Bhakkar.

The Therhi Massacre occurred on 3 June 1963, when Shias in the village of Therhi attempted to carry a tazia in procession. Upon hearing this news, students from a nearby Deobandi seminary in Khairpur went to Therhi and set fire to both the tazia and imambargah. In the ensuing violence, 120 people were brutally killed with meat cleavers and machetes. On the same day, a mourning procession at Bhati Gate, Lahore, was attacked with stones and knives, resulting in the deaths of two mourners and injuries to nearly a hundred others. Mourners were also attacked in Narowal, Chiniot, and Quetta.

== See also ==
- Anti-Shi'ism
- Genocide of Kashmiri Shias
- Therhi Massacre
- Persecution of Hazara people
- Persecution of Shias by ISIL
- Syed Ahmad Barelvi
- Sipah-e-Sahaba Pakistan
