= Nishapuri =

Nishapuri or Nishaburi (Persian: نیشابوری) is a surname of Iranian origin. Notable people with the surname include:

- Hakim al-Nishaburi, Persian scholar (933–1014)
- Ghiyās od-Dīn Abul-Fatah Omār ibn Ibrāhīm Khayyām Nishābūrī (1048–1131), Persian poet, mathematician, philosopher and astronomer
- Attar Neyshapuri, pen name of Abū Ḥamīd bin Abū Bakr Ibrāhīm (c. 1145 – c. 1221), Persian poet, theoretician of Sufism, and hagiographer
- Bi Bi Monajemeh Nishaburi (1203–1280), female Persian mathematician and astronomer
- Naziri Nishapuri (c. 1560 – between 1612–1614), Indo-Persian poet
- Mirzá Áqá Buzurg-i-Nishapuri (1852–1869), Bahá'í martyr

== See also ==
- Nishapur
