= Baqer Moin =

Iranian journalist

Baqer Moin (Persian: باقر معین) is a BBC journalist and author. In 1999, he was head of BBC Persian, and was a BBC Central Asia specialist in 2001. Moin has been described as "a specialist on Iran and Islam.

According to The New York Times, Moin grew up in Iran, where he learned "Persian and Arabic poetry, mysticism and philosophy from his father, who was trained as a cleric but earned a living as a farmer." Moin studied in the religious seminaries of Mashhad in Eastern Iran before becoming a journalist. As of 27 August 2000 he was head of the BBC's Persian service, a broadcast service so influential in Iran that "even Ayatollah Khomeini listened to it". He is the author of the book Khomeini: Life of the Ayatolla. The NY Times called the book "the first serious and accessible examination of the ayatollah's life."

== See also ==
- Ruhollah Khomeini
- BBC Persian
- BBC
