= Azadari in Lucknow =

Practices related to the mourning of the death of Imam Husayn ibn Ali

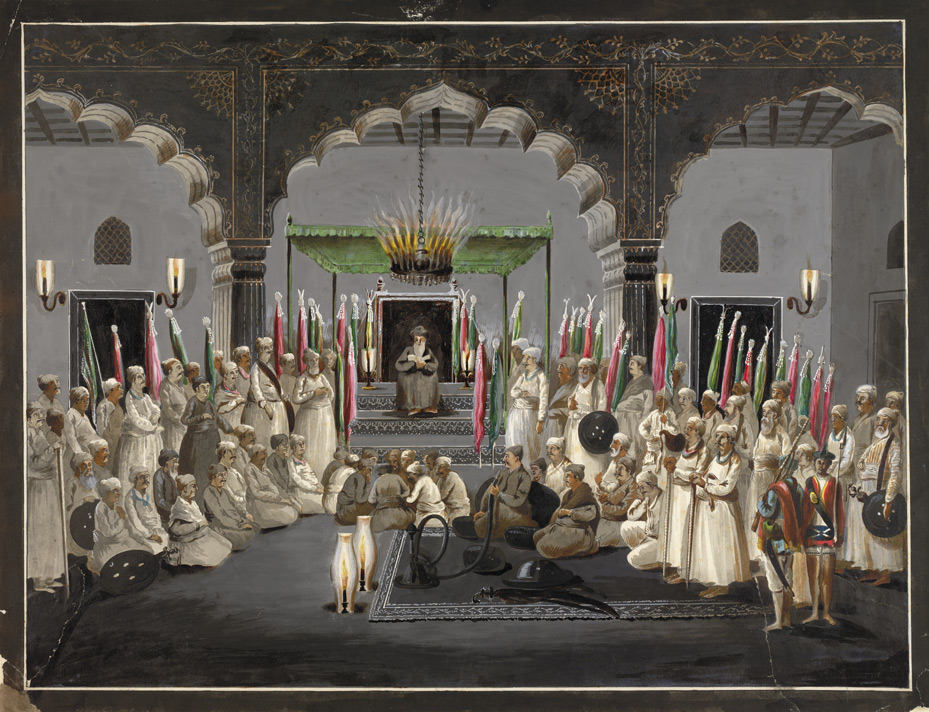
The Muharram, 1795: Asaf ud Daula, Nawab of Oudh, listening at night to the maulvi reading from the scriptures during Muharram, c. 1795.

Azadari in Lucknow or Mourning in Lucknow, is name of the practices related to mourning and commemoration of the anniversary of the death of Imam Husayn ibn Ali at the Battle of Karbala in 680, particularly in period of Muharram (in the Indian sub-continent Muharram in the context of remembrance of the events of Karbala means the period of two months & eight days i.e. 68 days starting from the evening of 29 Zill-Hijjah and ending on the evening of 8 Rabi-al-Awwal) and in general round the year.

The Government of Uttar Pradesh banned the processions in 1977 because of riots and violence. As a result of protests, demonstrations, court arrests, self immolations and deaths of Shia youth, under the leadership of shia ulemas, the Shias were permitted by the government to stage an Azadari procession in January 1998 (21st of Ramzan). A limited number of processions are allowed, and security is tight.

== Azadari during Nawabi period ==
Nawab Asafudaula used to spend 60,000 Rupees on a single Muharram.

== Communal riots and ban on azadari in Lucknow ==
During Nawabi time Azadari practices were even observed by non-Shias, particularly Sunni Muslims of lower stratum. Sleeman, who spent considerable time in Lucknow notes that the Shias and the Sunnis participated with equal enthusiasm in practices of Muharram.

Riots took place in 1908, 1930s, 1968, 1969, 1974 and 1977. The Government of Uttar Pradesh banned the processions in 1977.

Even the Shias and Sunnis concede that the Shia-Sunni conflict in Lucknow is not long-standing. They date it back to start of the 20th century.

=== Riot of 1908 and Piggot committee ===
The first Shia–Sunni riot occurred in 1908, when a tazia procession of Shias was attacked by a group of militant Sunnis hiding in a Sunni mosque. After which a four-member committee under the chairmanship of Justice T. C. Piggot, an ICS officer and a judge of High Court was formed to look into the matter. The conclusion of committee was that "the attempt to transform the tazia processions in honour of first four Caliphs was an innovation. "The personal knowledge of those members of the Committee who are well acquainted with Lucknow is on the whole favourable to Shia view." The Committee also recommended that there should be general prohibition against the organised recitation of Madhe-Sahaba verses on three days, viz., ashura (the tenth day of Muharram), Chehlum (the fortieth day of ashura), and the twenty-first day of Ramzan. The Government accepted the report of the Committee.

=== Tensions in 1930s, riot of 1935 and Allsop committee ===
In 1935, on the day of Chehlum, some sunnis defied the order and recited the Madhe-Sahaba, which resulted in immediate tensions and skirmishes between Shias and Sunnis. For three months Sunnis built pressure by defying prohibitory orders. When other re-conciliatory efforts failed, the government appointed the Allsop Committee under Justice Allsop of Allahabad High Court to consider the question of public recitation of the Madhe-Sahaba afresh. The Allsop Committee reiterated the position of Piggott Committee. Eventually, on 28 March 1938, the Government published the Allsop Committee's report and stood by it.

=== Civil disobedience movement of 1938 & sanctions on Madhe-Sahaba during Barawafat ===
The Sunnis were dissatisfied with the decision of Government to adhere to suggestions made in Allsop Committee report and started a civil disobedience movement. In late April 1938, Zafrul Malik and Abdul Shakur, the two main leaders of Madhe-Sahaba movement with 26 eminent Sunni ulemas declared in a public meeting that recitation of Madhe-Sahaba could not be restricted for even a single day. The next day, bricks were thrown at a Shia Tazia procession in Patanala; 10 people were killed and several dozens injured. Next several months saw a buildup in tensions between Shias and Sunnis. To defend themselves and coordinate their civil disobedience campaigns, the Sunnis formed the Anjuman Tahaffuz-e-Namus Sahaba and the Shias formed the Anjuman Tanzimul Momineen.

After negotiations with Sunnis, the Congress Government issued, on 31 March 1939, a communique which stated that "the Sunnis will in any circumstances be given the opportunity of reciting Madhe-Sahaba at a public meeting, and in a procession every year on the barawafat day subject to the condition that the time, place and route thereof shall be fixed by district authorities." But the Government failed to engage Shias in negotiations or inform them beforehand of the ruling.

=== Civil disobedience movement, riot of 1939 and ban on Madhe-Sahaba and Tabarra ===
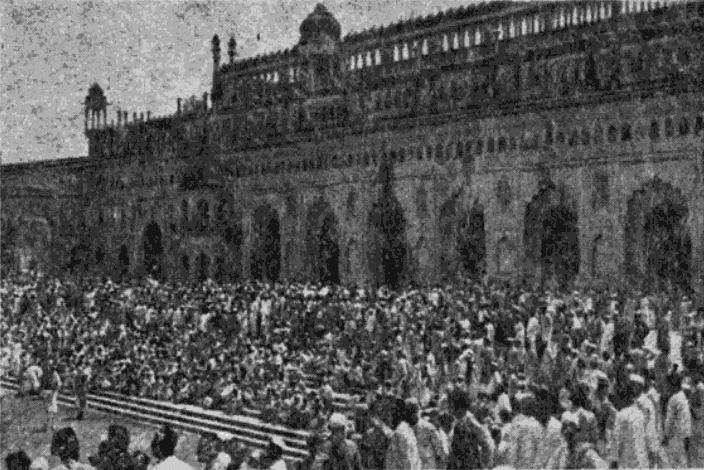
Crowds of Shia volunteer arrestees assembled in the compound of Asaf-ud-Daula Imambada (Bara Imambara) in preparation of tabarra, April 1939

The Shias initiated a civil disobedience movement as a result of the ruling. Some 1,800 Shias publicly protested, including prominent Shia figures such as Syed Ali Zaheer (newly elected MLA from Allahabad-Jaunpur), the Princes of the royal family of Awadh, the son of Maulana Nasir a respected Shia mujtahid (the eldest son, student and designated successor of Maulana Nasir Hussain ulema of Abaqati family), Shamshiir-e-Tabarra Ayatullah Syed Ali Shabbar Naqvi., Maulana Sayed Kalb-e-Husain and his son Maulana Kalb-e-Abid (both ulema of Nasirabadi/Ijtihadi family) and the brothers of Raja of Salempur and the Raja of Pirpur, important ML leaders. It was believed that Maulana Nasir himself besides the top ranking ML leaders such as Raja of Mahmudabad and Raja of Pirpur would together court arrest. A conference arbitrated by Maulana Azad failed to produce a settlement. The next day was the Barawafat, and the Sunnis performed a Madhe-Sahaba procession. The Shias were also allowed a procession, and a riot occurred during which several people were killed. The district authorities banned the public recitation of Madhe-Sahaba and Tabarra in processions and meetings held in public places in 1940 (the following year).

=== 1940s ===
The Shia-Sunni problem of Lucknow persisted through the 1940s.

=== 1950s ===
In early 1950s too district administration kept refusing Madhe-Sahaba processions and counter processions and courts upheld such stands.

=== 1960s ===
After unrest in the earlier part of the year, a riot occurred on 26 May 1969 after a Shia procession was brick-batted from a Sunni mosque near Mahmood Nagar.

== Azadari movement in Lucknow ==
Following the ban in 1977 Shia community under the leadership of Syed Kalbe Abid Naqvi and later o his son Maulana Syed Kalbe Jawad Naqvi continued to agitate peacefully and annually offered mass arrests during period of Muharram. These practices for protests continued for 20 years until 1997 during which processions were banned on public roads while majalises and processions were allowed in private campuses such as homes, Imambarahs, Karbala, etc.

=== Successive movement and events ===
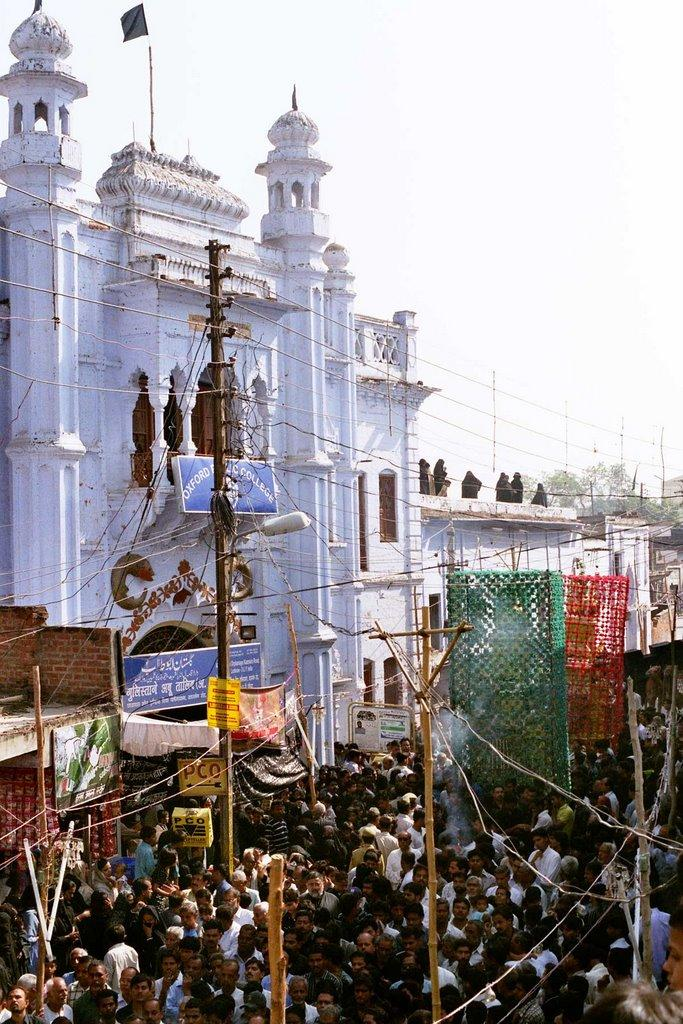
Muharram procession in Lucknow, India, Jan 2007.

As of 2010 the district administration allows only a limited number of processions, and security is tight. On 17 December 2010 on day of Ashura Shia Sunni clash in Lucknow happened which left three injured.

In 2013, on 16 January two people were killed and several more seriously injured when gunmen fired shots at people coming out of a "majlis" at Deputy Saheb ka Imambara in Agha Mir Dyodhi locality in the Wazirganj. The next day, two youths were attacked at a protest while placing the body of one of the victims the Chowk crossing.

== Imambaras, Dargahs, Karbalas and Rauzas ==
Following is list of notable Imambaras, Dargahs, Karbalas and Rauzas:

- Aasafi Imambara or Bara Imambara
- Imambara Husainabad Mubarak or Chhota Imambara
- Imambara Ghufran Ma'ab
- Dargah of Abbas, Rustam Nagar.
- Dargah of Abbas, Karbala Musahab-ud-Daulah (Misri ki Baghiya).
- Imambara of Bi Misri Saheba (Associated with Ali Akber, Karbala Musahab-ud-Daulah (Misri ki Baghiya).
- Imambara of Moghul Saheba, the highest "Mimber" in India is kept in this Imambara.
- Imambara of Zain-ul-Abidin Khan
- Karbala of Dayanat-ud-Daulah
- Karbala King Naseer-ud-Din Haider
- Karbala Agha Meer or Karbala Moata-mud-Daula, Narhi, Lucknow
- Imambara Sibtainabad Mubarak or Imambara Jannat Nasheen
- Karbala Shraf-ud-Daulah (Rauza Kazmain)
- Imambara Shah Najaf (Associated with Imam Ali.
- Karbala Mir Khuda Baksh or Talkatora Karbala & Imambara Kaiwan Jah
- Karbala Azimullah Khan or Nehro wali Karbala.
- Imambara of Agha Baqar (Associated with Abbas).
- Karbala Malika Afaq Sahiba (Ghaar ki Karbala) or Karbala-e-Askarien.
- Karbala Malika Jahan Sahiba (Aishbagh ki Karbala).
- Karbala Rafiq-ud-Daulah (Karbala Abbas Bagh).
- Imambara of Saudagar.
- Imambara of Nazim Saheb.
- Imambara of (Nawab Salarjung Bahadur) Mirza Mohammad Ali Khan Saheb or Kaala Imambara.

=== Alam-e-Fateh-e-Furat of Muharram 8 ===
Alam-e-Fateh-e-Furat originates from the Daryawali Masjid behind Medical College in late evening. This procession ends at the Imambara Ghufran Ma'ab at around midnight. Lakhs of Shias from Lucknow and the neighbouring districts take part in the procession.

=== Alam-e-Shab-e-Ashur of Muharram 9 ===
Alam-e-Shab-e-Ashur originates from Imambada Nazim Saheb located on Victoria Street in late evening. After the Shahi processions of 1st Muharram and 7th Muharram this is one of the oldest procession in first 10 days of Muharram in Lucknow that started in 1926 by Late Qaiser Husain Rizvi. In 1361(AH) to mark the 1300 years of the event of Karbala in memory of Imam Husain, a committee was formed by the name of Yaadgaray Husaini and this procession in that year was named as Yaadgaray Husaini but after the dissolution of the committee in 1939, Qaiser Husain Rizvi again took the responsibility and since then it is popularly known as Alam e Shab e Ashur. Following his death in 1971 his nephews continued this tradition up till now.This procession starts from Imambada Nazim Sahab and ends at Dargah Abbas (Rustam Nagar)at around close to early morning. Several hundreds of thousands (Lakhs) of Shias from Lucknow and neighboring districts participate in the procession.

=== Yaad-e-Sakina " Remembering Bibi Sakina" ===
This is a Mourning event organised on the 4th Sunday of the month of Muharram every year at Imambara Husainabad Mubarak (The Chhota Imambara), Husainabad. During this event a temporary small scale replica of the "Qaid Khana" (Prison or Dungeon) is constructed with a small grave of Bibi Saiyyada Sakina inside this "Qaid Khana" to depict the Agony of Bibi Saiyyada Sakina. Thousands of mourners gather here to visit the "Qaid Khana" and to pay tribute to Bibi Saiyyada Sakina. This event was first held in the year 1990 A.D. by Late Muhammad Sarfaraz Khan Sahab (Late. Banney Miya Sahab) of Beal Wala Tila, Muftiganj, Lucknow. The members of Anjuman-e-Gulzaar-e-Panjetan take active part in the organisation and management of this event.

== See also ==
- Azadari
- Husayniyya
- Soaz
- Tazia
- Marsiya
- Noha
- Tatbeer
- Qama Zani
- Talwar
- Imambaras of Lucknow
- Madhe Sahaba Agitation
