= Mousavi (surname) =

Mousavi is a surname. It is also spelled Moosavi, Mossavi, Moussaoui, Moussavi and Moussawi. The word is an adjective in Arabic which means descendants of Musa al-Kazim. Notable people with the name include:

== Politics ==
- Abbas al-Musawi (1952–1992), Lebanese Muslim cleric and leader of Hezbollah
- Abdolrahim Mousavi (1960–2026), Iranian general
- Syed Hamid Ali Shah Moosavi (1940–2022), Pakistani Islamic scholar
- Fakhraddin Mousavi (1930–2021), Iranian judge and politician
- Farid Mousavi, Iranian politician
- Majid Mousavi (born 1965), Iranian military commander
- Mir-Hossein Mousavi (born 1942), Iranian politician
- Mohammad Vaez Mousavi (born 1964), Iranian cleric and politician
- Ruhollah Musavi Khomeini (1900—1989), Supreme Leader of Iran
- Seyed Mohsen Mousavi, Iranian diplomat

== Sport ==
- Ahmad Mousavi (born 1992), Iranian football player
- Ali Mousavi (footballer) (born 1976), Iranian football player
- Alireza Mousavi (born 1990), Iranian handball player
- Danial Mousavi (born 1997), Iranian football player
- Hussain Al-Moussawi (born 1988), Kuwaiti football player
- Iman Mousavi (born 1989), Iranian footballer
- Kaveh Mousavi (born 1985), Iranian athlete
- Mohammad Mousavi (born 1987), Iranian volleyball player
- Seyed Ayoub Mousavi (born 1995), Iranian weightlifter

== Other people ==
- Farshid Moussavi (born 1965), Iranian-born British architect
- Granaz Moussavi (born 1946), Iranian-born Australian poet, film director and screenwriter
- Ibrahim Mousawi (born 1965), Lebanese journalist
- Hamid Hussain Musavi (1830–1888), Indian scholar
- Jamaluddin Mousavi (born 1976), Afghan TV presenter
- Muhammad Quli Musavi (1775–1844), Indian scholar
- Mohammad Mofti-ol-shia Mousavi (1928–2010), Iranian Twelver Shi'a Marja
- Seyed Ali Mousavi, nephew of Mir-Hossein Mousavi who was killed during the 2009 Iranian election protests
- Syed Askar Mousavi (born 1956), Afghan author
- Sayyed Razi Mousavi (1963–2023), Iranian major general in the IRGC's Quds Force

== See also ==
- Al-Musawi
- Musavi (name)
- Rana Mousabi
- Zacarias Moussaoui
