= Muhammad Quli Musavi =

Muhammad Quli Musavi Khan Kintoori (1775–1844), (Hindi: अयातोल्लाह सय्यिद मीर मुसावी किन्तूरी, Urdu: آيت‌الله سیید میر موسوی کنتوری ), was principal Sadr Amin at the British court in Meerut. He was also author of Tathir al-mu'minin 'an najasat al-mushrikin.

Muḥammad Qulī was a son of Muḥammad Ḥusayn. He was popularly known as Mīr Muḥammad Qulī. He had three sons, Sayyid Sirāj Ḥusayn (1823–65), Sayyid Iʿjāz Ḥusayn (1825–1870) and Sayyid Ḥāmid Ḥusayn (1830–1888).

He wrote five books in refutation of different chapters of the Tuhfehye Ithna Ashariyyah of Shah Abdul Aziz Dehlawi:

- Al Sayf al Nasiri, on the first chapter
- Taqlid al Mmaka'id, on the second chapter
- Burhan al Sa`adah, on the seventh chapter
- Tashyid al Mmata'in li kashf al Ddagha'in, in two volumes on the tenth chapter
- Masari al Afham li qal al Awham.

== See also ==
- Islamic scholars
