= Shia Jama Mosque, Delhi =

Mosque in Delhi, India

Shia Jama Masjid
- Hindi: शिया जामा मस्जिद; Punjabi: ਸ਼ਿਆ ਜਾਮਾ ਮਸਜਿਦ; Urdu: شیعہ جامع مسجد
- Location of the mosque in Central Delhi

Religion
- Affiliation: Shia Islam
- Ecclesiastical or organizational status: Mosque
- Leadership: Syed Mohsin Ali Taqvi (Hujjatul-Islam Imam)
- Status: Active

Location
- Location: Central Delhi, Delhi NCT
- Country: India
- Interactive map of Shia Jama Masjid
- Coordinates: 28°39′3″N 77°13′59″E

Architecture
- Type: Mosque architecture
- Style: Indo-Islamic

Specifications
- Dome: Three
- Minaret: Two

The Shia Jama Masjid (Hindi: शिया जामा मस्जिद; Punjabi: ਸ਼ਿਆ ਜਾਮਾ ਮਸਜਿਦ; Urdu: شیعہ جامع مسجد) is a Shia Islam mosque located at Kashmiri Gate, Delhi, India.

Hujjatul-Islam Syed Mohsin Ali Taqvi is the imam of the congregation.

== See also ==
- Shia Islam in India
- List of mosques in India
