= Ahmad Hindi =

Indian Twelver Shia Muslim scholar (1800–1869)

Sayyid Ahmad Hindi
- سید احمد موسوی هندی

Personal life
- Born: 1800 Kintoor, Oudh State, British India (present-day Barabanki district, Awadh region, Uttar Pradesh, India)
- Died: 1869 (aged 68–69)
- Relatives: Khomeini family

Religious life
- Religion: Islam
- Denomination: Shia
- Jurisprudence: Ja'fari (Usuli)
- Creed: Twelver

Sayyid Ahmad Musavi Hindi (Persian: سید احمد موسوی هندی; 1800–1869) was an Indian-born Iranian Twelver Shia Muslim cleric of Persian origin. He was the paternal grandfather of the first supreme leader of the Islamic Republic of Iran, Ruhollah Khomeini.

== Biography ==
=== India ===
His family migrated towards the end of the 18th century from Nishapur, Iran to Awadh in northern India. They settled in the town of Kintoor, Barabanki district. Zayn al-'Abidin al-Musavi, who was progenitor of Sayyids of Kintoor, was the great-great-grandfather of Syed Ahmad. He was born in Kintoor.

=== Iraq ===
In about 1830, he permanently left India, initially on a pilgrimage to the tomb of Ali in Najaf, Iraq. According to Baqer Moin, this movement was to escape colonial rule.

=== Iran ===
He visited Iran in 1834 and bought a house in Khomeyn. He later purchased more land in and around Khomeyn, including an orchard and caravanserai. These properties remained in the family up to modern times.

By 1841, he had married three wives: Shirin Khanum, Bibi Khanum, and Sakineh (his friend Yusuf Khan Kamareh'i's sister), all from Khomeyn. He had five children, including a son named Mostafa (father of Ruhollah Khomeini), who was born in 1856 in Sakineh.

== Death ==
He died in 1869 and was buried in Karbala.

== The Hindi nisba (title) ==
He continued to be known by the nisba (title) Hindi (i.e. from Hind or India), indicating his stay there. Even Ruhollah Khomeini used Hindi as a pen name in some of his ghazals. Ruhollah Khomeini's brother was known by the name Nur-od-Din Hindi.
