= Al-Ahdal =

Al-Ahdal (Arabic: الأهدل) is an Arabic surname. Notable people with the surname include:

- Abdullah al-Ahdal (died 1989), Belgian Imam
- Mohammed Hamdi al-Ahdal (born 1971), Saudi Al-Qaeda member
- Wajdi al-Ahdal (born 1973), Yemeni writer and playwright
