= Muhammad Quli =

Muhammad Quli (Azerbaijani: Məhəmmədqulu; Turkmen: Muhammetguly; Uzbek: Muhammadquli; Persian: محمدقلی, romanized: Mohammadqoli; Urdu: محمد قلی, romanized: Muhammad Qulī) is a Turkic-derived Muslim male given name meaning 'slave of Muhammad'. It is built from quli. It is equivalent to Arabic-derived Abd al-Muhammad or Persian-derived Gholammohammad.

== People ==
- Muhammad Quli Qutb Shah
- Muhammad Quli Musavi
- Muhammadquli Khan
- Mohammad Qoli Salim Tehrani
- Mohammad-Qoli Khan of Erivan
- Mohammad-Qoli Khan Qajar
- Muhammetguly Ogshukov
