= Mirza Mohammed Athar =

Mirza Mohammad Athar
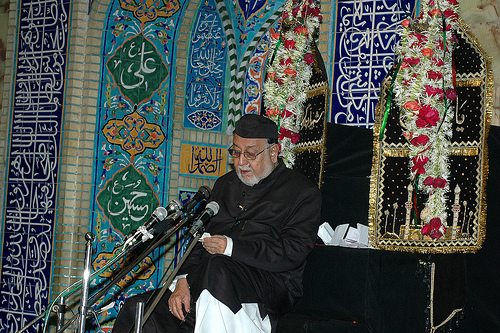
- An image of Maulana Mirza Mohammad Athar, Masjid e Iranian, Mumbai
- Title: Khateeb-e-Akbar

Personal life
- Born: 9 September 1936 Lucknow, United Provinces, British India
- Died: 26 February 2016 (aged 79) New Delhi, India

Religious life
- Religion: Twelver Shi'a Islam
- Institute: All India Shia Personal Law Board

Mirza Mohammad Athar (September 9, 1936 – February 26, 2016) was an Indian Shia Muslim Scholar.

== Life ==
He was the son of Mirza Mohammad Tahir. Mirza Athar was born in Lucknow and was educated at Sultan-ul-Madaris, where he graduated with Sadr-ul-Afazil, and Lucknow University, where he obtained a master's degree in Persian Literature. In 2008, he completed fifty years of continuous Muharram recitation in Mumbai. In addition to his native Lucknow, he was popular all over India as well as in Pakistan, the Middle East, UK, US and Australia. On 23 January 2005, he was elected first president of All India Shia Personal Law Board (AISPLB). Maulana Athar Died on Friday, 26 February 2016 at Max Hospital Saket, New Delhi and Khatib-e-Akbar was buried in his home town of Lucknow at Karbala Imdad Hussain Khan, Rajajipuram beside his father's grave. Thousand of his followers from all communities attended his last journey on Saturday, 27 February 2016 which originated from Karbala Dyanat ud daula, after his Namaz-e-Janaza led by another top Shia cleric Ayatullah Hameed-ul-Hasan. Uttar Pradesh Chief minister Mr. Akhilesh Yadav was present on his funeral time along with other prominent members.

His first death anniversary was observed on 26 February 2017 at Bada Imambada where a large gathering was present to pay their homage to the late Khatib-e-akbar. UP governor Mr Ram Naik addressed the majlis & remembered his memories. Pakistani poet Late Rehan Azmi also addressed the majlis with his Nazranaye-e-Aquidat towards the late Khatib-e-Akbar. The majlis was addressed by Maulana Shahenshah Hussain Naqvi of Pakistan. His son Mirza Yaqoob Abbas is a Shia activist based in Lucknow.
