= Madhiha Hassan al-Mosuwi =

Aid worker

Madeeha Hasan Odhaib (born Madhiha Hassan al-Mosuwi) is an aid worker for the Iraqi government who some people have begun calling as the "Mother Teresa of Baghdad." In 2008, she was selected by Time magazine as one of the most influential people in the world.
