= All India Shia Personal Law Board =

Indian Shia organisation

All India Shia Personal law Board
- Founder: Mirza Mohammed Athar
- Established: May 2005
- Mission: Represent the rights of Shia Muslim in India.
- President: Syed Saim Mehdi Naqvi
- Chair: Kalbe Sadiq
- Head: Yasoob Abbas
- Location: Lucknow, Uttar Pradesh, India

All India Shia Personal Law Board (AISPLB) is an organisation formed in January 2005 to represent the rights of Shia Muslims in India. It was felt that the current board, the All India Muslim Personal Law Board (AIMPLB) had been neglecting the views of Shia Muslims in India. Maulana Kalbe Sadiq, vice chairman of the Shia board is also senior vice president of All India Muslim Personal Law Board (AIMPLB).

== Model Nikahnama ==
In 2016, All India Shia Personal Law Board came out with a model 'nikahnama' that denounced triple talaq in one sitting among the Muslims. Until both husband and wife give their consent for divorce, it cannot take place. A similar draft was presented at AISPLB convention in Mumbai in 2007.

== Shia Board members ==
Chairman
Maulana Kalbe Sadiq

Religious Advisors
Ayatollah Syed Mohammad Jafar Rizvi (Daam e zallahu) – Principal Sultan ul Madaris LUCKNOW
Maulana Syed Ali Taqvi (Delhi) – Imam-e-Juma Shia Jama Mosque, Delhi
Maulana Syed Ghulam Hussain Raza Agha (Hyderabad)
Maulana Syed Mohammad Taqi Rizvi (Lucknow, Uttar Pradesh)
Maulana Mahmoodul Hasan Khan (Jaunpur) Ex-Principal Hawzah Ilmiya Nasirya
Maulana Taqi-ul-Haideri (Faizabad) – Principal Wasiqa Arabia College

President
Syed Saim Mehdi Naqvi (Lucknow)

Vice Presidents
Maulana Syed Ali Taqvi (Delhi) – Imam-e-Juma Shia Jama Masjid Delhi
Maulana Syed Mohammad Taqi Rizvi (Lucknow)
Maulana Syed Saim Mehdi (Lucknow)

General Secretary
Maulana Syed Ghulam Hussain Raza Agha (Hyderabad)

Secretaries
Maulana Syed Sharafat Hussain Kazmi (Meerut)
Dr. Syed Sadiq Naqvi (Hyderabad)
Maulana Syed Zaheer Abbas (Mumbai)
Maulana Dr. Mohammad Raza (Lucknow)

Joint Secretaries
Maulana Zaheer Ahmad Iftikhari (Lucknow)
Maulana Ali Hussain Qummi (Lucknow)
Maulana Syed Abbas Irshad Naqvi (Lucknow)
Shikoh Azad (Lucknow)

Secretary of Finance
Advocate Mubarak Hussain (Lucknow)

Treasurer
Professor S. M. Sayeed

Founder Member
Hashim Zaidi

In December 2005, vice-president, Maulana Engineer Qadim Hussain died. (In March 2007, President Mumbai Region Syed Mohammed Nawab Zaidi died.) On 26 January 2010, Religious Advisor Ayatullah Maulana Syed Mohammad Jafar Rizvi died in the city of Lucknow.
