= Yasoob Abbas =

Indian Muslim scholar

Maulana Mohammed Mirza Yasoob Abbas
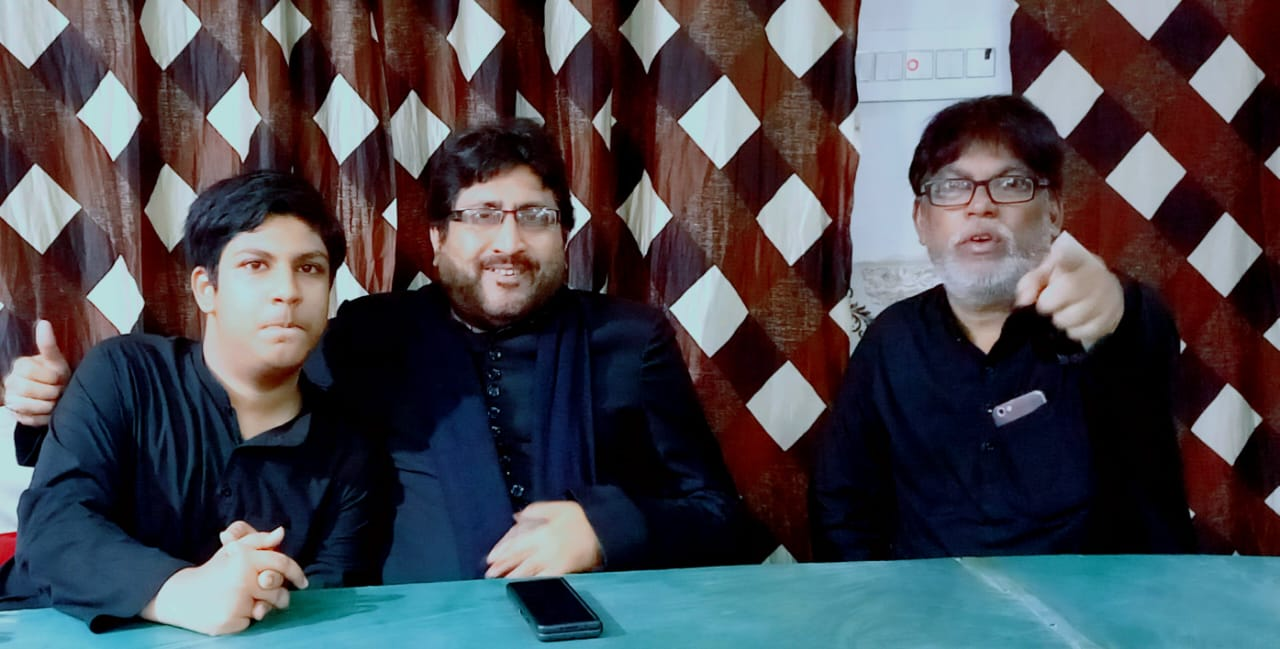
- Yasoob Abbas in Sarania Karbala, Kolkata, India

General Secretary Shia College, Lucknow

Personal life
- Born: 21 March 1970 (age 56) Lucknow, Uttar Pradesh, India
- Spouse: Abbas Mubarika
- Parent: Mirza Mohammed Athar Sahab (father)
- Citizenship: Indian
- Education: Shia College
- Occupation: Islamic cleric and Speaker

Religious life
- Religion: Islam
- Denomination: Shia

Maulana Mohammad Mirza Yasoob Abbas is an Islamic cleric and speaker of All India Shia Personal Law Board (AISPLB). He is a member of the India Islamic Culture Centre, Delhi and Shia College, Lucknow.

== Views ==
- Abbas criticized the Uttar Pradesh Government for ordering madrasas to participate in Independence Day celebrations without making the same requirement of all educational institutions.
- Abbas welcomed the Supreme Court verdict banning triple talaq as a victory for the Muslim women, noting "there was no arrangement of triple talaq in the times of Holy Prophet...We want a strong legislation against triple talaq...A law similar to the one against the practice of Sati."
- Speaking for the All India Shia Personal Law Board, Abbas criticized former Uttar Pradesh Shia Waqf Board chairman Waseem Rizvi for filing a petition to removal of 26 verses from the Quran which Rizvi claimed promoted terrorism. Abbas described the petition as an "insult to Muslims of the entire world."
- He said, "Pakistan has become the epicentre of terrorism where terrorist organisations are continuously targeting the Shia community. He said that Prophet Muhammad and his ‘Ahl al-Bayt’ (family members) have given the message of peace and humanity to the world. Through the conference, ulemas will spread the message of humanity and peace." While he remarked over it his opponents blamed him for grabbing Shia college of Lucknow and asking millions of bribe for seat selling and nepotism. But later he invited the Pakistani cleric Shahenshah Naqvi to restore peace between the two nations which also benefited BRICS.
