= Zaidpur =

- Town
- Location in Uttar Pradesh, India
- Coordinates: 26.83°N 81.33°E
- Country: India
- State: Uttar Pradesh
- District: Barabanki
- Founder: Abdullah Zar-baqsh

Population (2011)
  - Total: 34,443

Languages
  - Official: Hindi, Urdu
- Time zone: UTC+5:30 (IST)
- PIN: 225414
- Vehicle registration: UP-41

Zaidpur is a town located in Barabanki, Uttar Pradesh.

== Geography ==
Zaidpur covers approximately 3 km^{2} of non-mountainous terrain.

=== Location ===
Zaidpur lies at 26.83°N 81.33°E in India's north east. Its nearest service centre is Nawabganj, approximately 20 km to the northwest and its nearest city is Lucknow, approximately 30 km to the west. Faizabad is further away to the east. Delhi and Agra lie to the west. The border with Nepal lies approximately 150 km to the northeast. Zaidpur's elevation is 109 metres (357 feet).

=== Transport ===
Zaidpur lies on state highway 13. The nearest passenger airport is the Chaudhary Charan Singh International Airport at Lucknow, 60.2 kilometres (37.4 mi) from Zaidpur.

=== Hydrology ===
Derivatives of the Ganga river and Gomti River, local rain in wet months and wells supply water to Zaidpur.

=== Climate ===
July is the wettest month in Zaidpur with an average of 22 days of rain and average monthly precipitation of 237mm. The wet season is between May and September. The hottest month is May with an average high temperature of 40 °C. The coldest month is January with an average low temperature of 8 °C.

== Demographics ==
Zaidpur has a population of 34,443, of which 17,747 are men and 16,696 are women. The proportion of children between the ages of 0-6 is 16.30%. The Literacy rate of Zaidpur is 49.50% lower than state average of 67.68%. Male literacy is around 55.67% while female literacy is 42.89%. Muslims form 81.89% of the total population with the remaining population overwhelmingly Hindu.

== History ==
Zaidpur was a Musalman military colony founded in 462 Hijri (1070 AD) by Abdullah Zar-baqsh, an immigrant from Qom, Persia. The settlement was named for Zar-Baksh's only son, Zaid (b. 462 Hijri (1070 AD)).

Zar-baqsh was a descendant of the prophet Muhammad through his daughter, Fatimah and her husband, Ali, and thus was of the Rizvi family, in the 14th generation from Muhammad. Zar-baqsh's father was Yaqoob and his grandfather was Ahmad (924–969 AD), a naqib (official investigator) of Qom.

== Economy ==
Due to unemployment, people of this town are compelled to work in Metropolitan cities. A substantial number of people work in the government sector. Enterprises in Zaidpur include a postal service; bank; school; an LPG gas agency; sugar cane farming equipment sales; winnowing fan sales; cinema halls; medical services; and small scale textile manufacturing and hub for export quality hand-loom products and produced a lot of exporters, scarves and cotton stoles from a tradition of hand-loom weaving).
