= Ijtihadi family =

Family of the Naqvis

The Ijtihadi family (or Khandān-e-Ijtihād) is sub-branch of the Naqvis. The family uses last name "Naqvi" to denote that they are descendants of the Islamic prophet Muhammad through the lineage of the Imam Ali al-Naqi.

== Roots ==
The Oudh family of Sayyids of Nasirabad And Jais settled in Rae Bareli during the eleventh century. Naqvi Sadat migrated from Subzwar (Iran) and arrived in Jais around 410 Hijri (around 1027 AD). During the reign of Sher Shah Suri, adjacent Patakpur was renamed Nasirabad, after Syed Nasirudin. Further settlement happened with few decided to build their homes in a village, within few kms from Nasirabad, known as Parshadepur, Raebareli. Ayattollah Al Uzma Sayyid Dildar Ali Naqvi 'Gufraanmaab Naseerabadi ', his family came to be called Khandan e Ijtihad due to prominence of high-ranking scholars in its midst. Notable religious scholars from this lineage include Syedul Ulema Syed Ali Naqi Naqvi 'Naqqan', zubdat-ul-ulma Molana Syed Agha Mehdi Lakhnavi (Karachi), Raes-ul-Ullema Ayatollah Maulana Syed Kazim Naqvi, Mumtaz ul Ulema Ayatullah ul Uzma Sayyid Murtaza Naqvi, Sadr-Ul-Ulema Ayatullah ul Uzma Sayyid Baqir Naqvi, Maulana Abdul Hasan Naqvi, Jannat Ma'ab Ayatullah Syed Mohammad Naqvi, Deputy Syed Ali Akbar Naqvi, Shamshiir-e-Tabarra Ayatullah Syed Ali Shabbar Naqvi, Ayatullah Syed Ali Anwar Naqvi (Ali Munawwar), Ayatullah Aqa Hasan Sb, Ayatullah Syed Kalbe Hussain Naqvi, Hujjatul Islam Syed Kalbe Abid Naqvi, Malaz-ul-Ulama Syed Hasan Naqvi, Hujjatul Islam Syed Kalbe Jawwad Naqvi, Hujjatul Islam Syed Hasan Zafar Naqvi (based in Karachi), Zakir e Shaam e Ghareeban Allama Mufti Syed Naseer ul Hussain Ijtehadi, Allama Dr Mohsin Naqvi, Allama Syed Siraj Ul Hasan Ijtehadi‚ Maulana Syed Sibte Hasan Naqvi, Maulana Dr Syed Mohammad Waris Hasan Naqvi, Dr Kalbe Sadiq, Hujjatul Islam Professor Syed Ali Mohammad Naqvi, Najmul Ulema Syed Ali Naqvi, Poet Qasim Shabbir Nasirabadi, Writer Syed Mustafa Hussain Naqvi(Aseef Jaisi) based in Lucknow, Famous Scholar/ Writer & Maulana Hujjatul Islam Syed Saeedul Hasan Naqvi Parshadepuri (based in Lucknow).

== Branches ==
Two main braches of Ijtehadi family are:

- Jaisi Sadaat, i.e. Syeds of Jais
- Nasirabadi Sadaat, i.e. Syeds of Nasirabad

== Prominent Ijtehadis ==
- Syed Dildar Ali Naqvi Nasirabadi Gufraanmaab
- Sultanul Ulama Sayyed Mohammad
- Ayatullah Sayyed Ali
- Ayatullah Sayyed Hasan
- Sayyedul Ulama Sayyed Hussain
- Mumtazul Ulama Sayyed Mohammad Taqi
- Ayatullah Sayyed Mohammad Ibrahim
- Taajul Ulama Sayyed Ali Mohammed
- Bahrul Uloom Sayyed Mohammad Hussain
- Ayatullah Sayyed Abul Hasan Naqvi
- Syed Kalbe Hussain
- Shamsheer-e-Tabarra Ayatullah Syed Ali Shabbar Naqvi
- Syed Naseer ul Hussain Ijtehadi
- Maulana Syed Ali Naqi Naqvi
- Maulana Syed Murtuza Naqvi
- Maulana Syed Kazim Naqvi
- Maulana Syed Baqir Naqvi
- Maulana Abdul Hasan Naqvi
- Syed Kalbe Abid Naqvi
- Syed Hasan Naqvi
- Syed Mohammad Waris Hasan Naqvi
- Syed Kalbe Sadiq
- Syed Kalbe Jawad Naqvi
- Qasim Shabbir Nasirabadi
- Syed Saif Abbas Naqvi
- Syed Mustafa Hussain Naqvi(Aseef Jaisi)
- Syed Saeedul Hasan Naqvi
- Lakhtey Haider Naqvi
- Tahseen Hyder Naqvi

== See also ==
- Abaqati family (or Khandan-e-Abaqat)
