= Syed Mohsin Nawab Rizvi =

Grand Ayatollah Syed Mohsin Nawab Rizvi
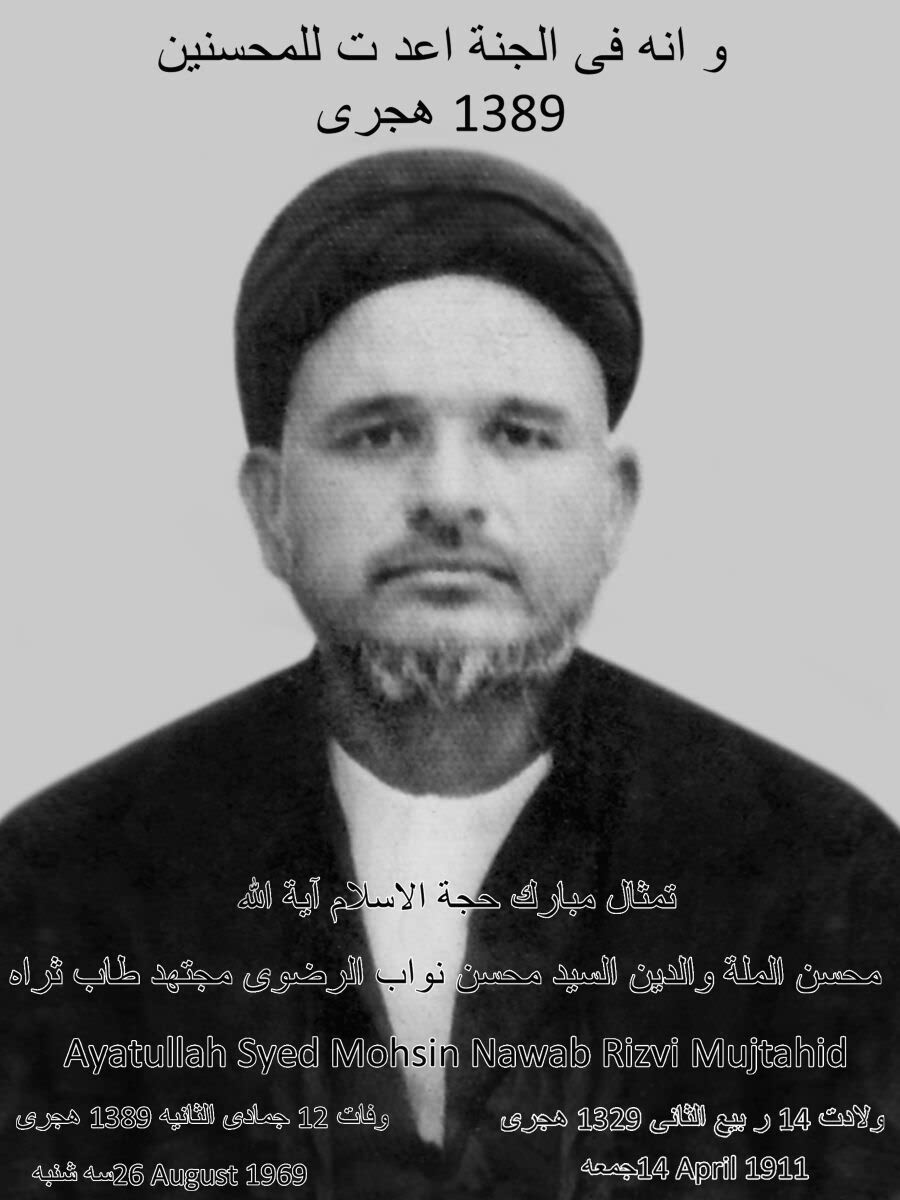
- Born: 14 April 1911; Lucknow, United Provinces of Agra and Oudh, British India
- Died: 26 August 1969 (aged 58); Lucknow, Uttar Pradesh, India
- Resting place: Imambara Ghufran Ma'ab
- Education: Fazil-e-Adab, Fazil-e-Tafsir (Shia), Sadar-ul-Afazil, Ijtihad
- Alma mater: Jamia Nazmia, Sultanul Madaris Lucknow, Hawza 'Ilmiyya Najaf
- Occupations: Principal, Faqīh
- Known for: Scholarly teaching, Falsafa (Islamic philosophy), Fiqh (jurisprudence), 'Ilm al-Hadith (traditions), Ilm al-Kalam (theology), 'Ilm ar-Rijal (evaluation of biographies), Mantiq (Logic), Lugha, Tafsir al-Qur'an (interpretation of the Qur'an) (language studies) academic writings, and oration.
- Notable work: Founder Managing trustee Shia Inter and DegreeCollege, Jaunpur, Founder of All India Shia Majlise Ulama [Council of Scholars]Lucknow
- Children: 3 Sons, 3 Daughters

Grand Ayatollah Syed Mohsin Nawab Rizvi (14 April 1911 – 26 August 1969; Arabic: ﺁيت الله العظمى سید محسن نواب رضوی) popularly referred to by his followers as Mohsin-ul-millat, was an Indian poet, writer, speaker and a Marja of the Twelver branch of Shia Islam. He served as vice principal of Sultanul Madaris, Lucknow, and as a principal of Govt Oriental College Madarsa Alia, Rampur and Madarsa Imaniya Nasiriya, Jaunpur.

== Biography ==
He was born in 1911 at Lucknow. His father Maulana Syed Ahmad Nawab Rizvi was a prominent Shia Scholar and was the editor of the monthly Urdu magazine, Alawarif. After earning his degree of Sadrul Afazil from Madrasa Sulatanul Madaris, he went to Hawza 'Ilmiyya Najaf, Iraq, where he studied Dars al-Kharij with Ayatollah Abu l-Hasan al-Isfahani, Ayatollah Syed Ziauddin Iraqi, Ayatollah Mirza Hussein Naini, Ayatollah Shaikh Abdul Husain Rashti, and Ayatollah Seyed Jawad Tabrezi, he earned an Ijaza-e-Ijtihad, a credential of islamic jurisprudencesignifying scholarly authority). Rizvi understood Urdu, Arabic and Farsi. During his student life in Lucknow he was the editor of an Arabic religious and literary magazine, Al-Adeeb, which was published under the patronage of Nasirul Millat Syed Nasir Husain. After returning from Iraq he was appointed as a principal of Jamaey Imaniya Nasirya, Jaunpur. He managed a middle school that later became known as Raza D.M. Shia Degree College in Jaunpur District. After Jaunpur, Rizvi was called on by then Nawab of Rampur Raza Ali Khan Bahadur Rampur State (U.P) India to take charge of the Madrsa-e-Aliya (Oriential college) Rampur (UP) as principal. After remaining few years as the principal he came back to Lucknow and joined Madrase Sultanul Madaris Lucknow (U.P.) India as vice principal, as the Matla-e-Anwar (written by Maulana Murtaza Husain Sadrul-Afazil). He was chief patron of the monthly Urdu magazine ALILM. He authored several works, some of which were published, while others remain unpublished. He was known as a khateeb (orator), particularly within the Shia community. He was the general secretary of All India Shia Majlise Ulama (Council of Scholars); among scholars he was known as Mohsinullmillat. He died on 26 August 1969 and is buried in Lucknow.

== Notable disciples ==
- Molvi Iftikhar Hussain Ansari Former MLA, Businessman, President All Jammu & Kashmir Shia Association. Srinagar, India.
- Maulana Syed Hamidul Hasan Ex- Principal Jamia Nazmia, Lucknow, India.
- Mirza Mohammed Athar, Ex Principal Shia college, Lucknow, India
- Dr.Syed Mohammad Waris Hasan Naqvi PhD (Edenbraugh University) Ex Principal Madrase Waizeen, Lucknow, India.
- Syed Ahmed (politician), Ex Governor Jharkhand and Manipur.
- Dr. Syed Kalbe Sadiq Naqvi PhD (Muslim University Aligarh) Lucknow, India.

== Writings ==
- Ghadeer se Karbala tak
- Hadees Madeenatul Ilm (Hadees ki Sanad aur uski dalalat)
- Zaereen-e- Qaime Aley Mohammad (A.S)
- Falsafa-e- Sahro Aijaz
- Kahalike Kaiynat aur Qadeem wa Jadeed Falsafi
- Altatheer
- Mhuaabat Ahlebait-e- Tahireen (A.S) wa Gunahgar Momineen
- Diwane Shaeri (Qasaed wa Gazalyat)
- Hazrat Mola Imam Hussain A.s ka Matam

== Books written in Arabic ==
- Almustanad (Bayyenatul Shia min masadere Ahlissunnah)
- Diwanul sher maal Mrasi Wa qasayed
- AsSamarat Talkhees wa tareebe Abaqatul Anwar
