= Imambara Ghufran Ma'ab =

Husayniyya in Nasirabad, Rajasthan, India

Imambara Ghufran Ma'ab (Urdu: اِمام باڑا غُفران مآب, Hindi: इमामबाड़ा ग़ुफ़्रान मआब) in Lucknow and Nasirabad, India is an imambara (a building used to commemorate the Muharram commemoration period in which Muslims, particularly Shias mourning the tragedy of Karbala in which Imam Hussain was killed) constructed by Shia cleric Ayatollah Syed Dildar Ali Naseerabadi (also known as Ghufran-Ma'ab) in the early 1790s.

== The imambara ==
The imambara is named Ghufran Ma'ab after popular name of Ayatollah Syed Dildar Ali 'Gufran Ma'ab' and is major religious culture center of Lucknow. It is run by his descendants of Ayatollah Ghufran Ma'ab, as of May 2012 his descendant, Maulana Syed Kalbe Jawad is mutawalli of the imambara. The imambara is located at Maulana Kalbe Hussain Road in Chowk locality of Lucknow.

Kalbe Jawad addresses the majlis (gathering) there for the first 10 days of the holy month of Muharram which is attended by thousands of people. The imambara is known internationally for its Shaam-e-Ghariban majlis.

== The graveyard ==
Outside the Imambara is a graveyard (part of the Imambara) which was intended to be used as a place of burial for scholars. Many eminent personalities are buried in its graveyard. People buried in its graveyard include Saheb e Abaqat Syed Hamid Husain, Maulana Syed Kalbe Hussain, Maulana Syed Kalbe Abid, Maulana Syed Ibne Hasan Nonaharvi and Sultan-ul-Ulema Maulana Syed Qaim Mahdi, Maulana Syed Mohammad Waris Hasan Naqvi, Maulana Syed Kalbe Sadiq.

== The Nasirabad imambara ==
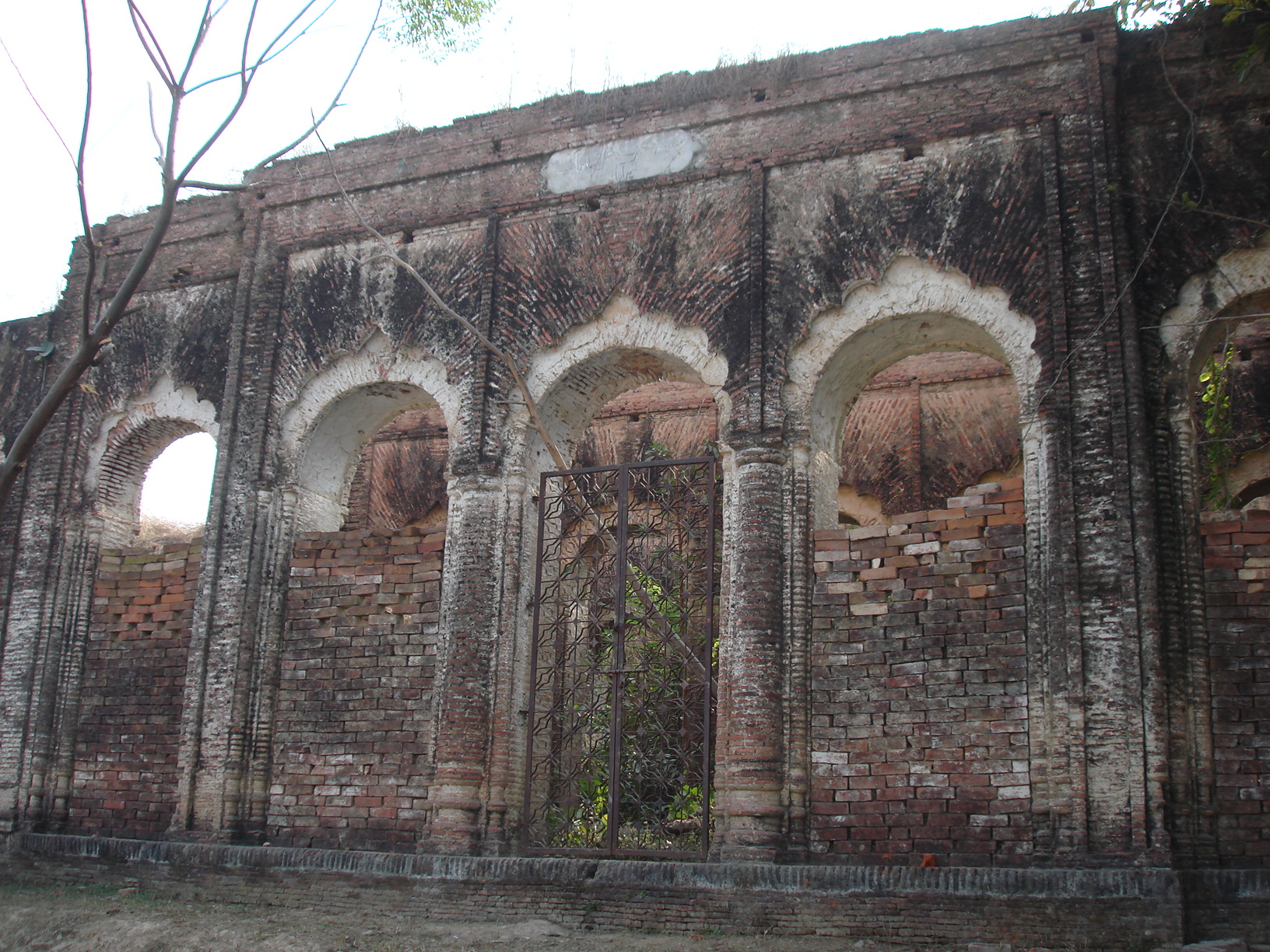
Imambara Ghufran Ma'ab in village-Nasirabad, Uttar Pradesh, India

There is an Imambarah with same name (i.e. Imambara Ghufran Ma'ab) in Nasirabad the ancestral village Ayatollah Syed Dildar Ali Naseerabadi.

== See also ==
- Bara Imambara
