= Madrasatul Waizeen =

Madrasatul Waizeen or Madrasatul Waezeen or Madrasat al-Wa'izin (College of Preachers), founded in 1919, is an old centre of Twelver Shia education in the city of Lucknow, India. Many of the clerics attend this school after they finish their graduate educations in other Shia seminaries to strengthen their oratory and preaching skills. It is well-known for the valuable manuscripts in its library.

== Foundation and development ==
The seminary was founded on 19 May 1919 by Maharaja Mohammad Ali Mohammad Khan of Mahmudabad in memory of his younger brother Sahibzada Mohammad Ali Ahmad Khan Sahib. The Waqf-e-Madrasa-e-Ahmadiya of Mahmudabad was created by the Maharaja of Mahmudabad in 1919 by way of a registered Waqfnama. The Madrastul Waizeen was founded by the aforementioned Waqf in 1919.

Shams-ul-Ulema Ayatullah Syed Najmul Hasan And Sanad-ul-Ulema Grand Ayatollah Sheikh Muhammad Ejaz Hasan Muhammadi was also amoung the founders.

== First Board of Trustees ==
The first Board of Trustees of the Waqf and therefore the Madrasa was as follows:

- Chairman: Maharaja Sir Mohammad Ali Mohammad Khan, K.C.S.I., K.C.I.E., of Mahmudabad
- Trustee: Najmul Millat Ayatullah Syed Najmul Hasan
- Trustee: Imam Jum'a of Mahmudabad
- Trustee: Mian Sheikh Mohammad Sadiq Ali Khan Sahib of Mohammadpur-Bishanpur, Barabanki District, U.P.
- Trustee: Syed Muzaffar Husain Sahib, Advocate, Qaziara, Sitapur, Sitapur District, India
- Trustee and Founder: Sanad-ul-Ulema Grand Ayatollah Sheikh Muhammad Ejaz Hasan Muhammadi was the managing trustee until his death in 1932.

The late Raja Mohammad Amir Ahmad Khan was the managing trustee from 1940 to 1944. Taj-ul-Ulama Grand Ayatollah Syed Mohammad Zaki (son of Shams-ul-Ulama Syed Mohammad and grandson of Shams-ul-Ulema Ayatullah Syed Najmul Hasan and student of Sanad-ul-Ulema Grand Ayatollah Sheikh Muhammad Ejaz Hasan Muhammadi) also served as the managing trustee.

Maharajkumar Mohammad Amir Haider Khan of Mahmudabad was the managing trustee until his demise in 1991.

The late Hujjatul Islam Maulana Mazahir Hussain a renowned 'Alim and scholar was a trustee of the Madrasa as the Imam-e-Jum'a of Mahmudabad, Sitapur District, India.

== Educational Program ==
Madrasatul Waizeen is considered a higher Shia religious education, where the students learn high levels of Shia studies, specially fiqh and usul al-fiqh, but also take some courses in preaching. The student of this seminary should pass a 3-year program of studying after which they should go for a journey of preaching for people in India or another country for two years, after which they would get the title of "wa'iz" (preacher).

Learning foreign languages such as Arabic, English, Persian, etc., are obligatory for the students of Madrasatul Waizeen. The students also take some courses about other religions and denominations so they would become able to engage in interfaith dialogue and preaching for people of other faiths.

The Madrasa has an annual event on the last week of every December, when everyone who is in any way related to this seminary participates in a 3-day conference and reports about what they do around the world, and they are also informed about the activities of the seminary during the last year. The place of the conference is different time to time.

== Library ==
The collections of the library of Madrasatul Waizeen include more than 20,000 books in print, and at least 1500 manuscripts. DR. Mohd. Taqi Ali Abidi, Asstt. Professor, Oriental Studies in Arabic & Persian, University of Lucknow compiled a Catalogue of Persian, Urdu & Arabic Manuscripts in Library of Madrasatul Waizeen in 1989-1990.Sanad-ul-Ulema Grand Ayatollah Sheikh Muhammad Ejaz Hasan Muhammadi donated approximately 90% of the books and manuscripts housed in the library of Madrasatul Waizeen, thereby making an extraordinary contribution to the preservation, advancement, and dissemination of Islamic scholarship and intellectual heritage.

== Activitees and associated institutions ==
Field of operations of this Madrasa has not been confined to India, but its missionaries have worked in Zanzibar, Uganda, Mombasa, Darussalam, Singapore, Shanghai. During the late 1920s, the Madrasatul Waezeen started sending their missionaries to East Africa. These missionaries were, specially trained for preaching and propagating the faith. They toured East Africa, visiting various Jamaats of Shia Ithna-Asheris and prepared a comprehensive report of their own activities. The nature of these visits was expeditious, protracted for a few months during which time some of them extended their visits to as far south as Madagascar, and northwards to Somalia.

The Madrasa has an associated institution in Mahmudabad, District Sitapur, India, known as Madrasa-e-Ahmadul Madaris. It is funded by the Raja of Mahmudabad.

== Former Principals ==
Former principals include:

- Khateeb e Azam Syed Sibte Hasan Naqvi*
- Ayatullah Syed Abul Hasan Naqvi*
- Allamah Adeel Akhtar Zaidi (from 1936 till his death in 1950) he served as the Second Principal of Madrasatul Waizeen, Lucknow
- Ayatullah Syed Rahat Hussain Rizvi Gopalpuri died in 1955
- Maulana Syed Ibne Hasan Nonaharvi (died on 25 March 1980)
- Maulana Prof. Syed Shabihul Hasan Nonaharvi (died on 13 May 1998)
- Maulana Syed Mohsin Rizvi Gopalpuri died in 2000
- Maulana Syed Mohammad Waris Hasan Naqvi (died on 11 May 2008)
- Maulana Mujtaba Ali Khan Adeebul Hindi Marhoom (vice-principal)
- Maulana Urujul Hasan Meesum Honorary Principal of Madrasatul Waizeen, Lucknow

== Notable alumni ==
- Ayatullah Syed Hamidul Hasan
- Syed Ali Akhtar Rizvi
- Kaifi Azmi

== Notable Publications ==
- The Holy Quran: A Translation with Commentary According to Shia Traditions and Principles. 2 vols. by A. F. Badshah Husain, 1936
- The Muslim review: an English monthly magazine of Madrasatul Waizeen.
- Monthly Alwaiz, Lucknow

== See also ==
- Jamia-e-Imania
- Jamia Nazmia
- Sultanul Madaris
- Tanzeemul Makatib
- Tafazzul Husain Kashmiri
