= Tanzeemul Makatib =

تنظیم المکاتب
- Founders: Late. Syed Ghulam Askari T.S., Maulana Mohammad Haider ("Sher-e-tabligh"), Maulana Karrar Haider
- Established: 1968
- Mission: To impart religious education to Shia Muslim students
- Focus: Jurisprudence, Theology, Literature
- Staff: 1650
- Address: Jagat Narayan Rd, Golaganj, Lucknow, Uttar Pradesh 226018
- Location: Golaganj, Lucknow, Uttar Pradesh, India
- Website: www.tanzeemulmakatib.org

Tanzeem ul Makatib is an organisation devoted to religious awareness among the Shiites in India for education based in Lucknow, Uttar Pradesh. The organisation currently runs 1246 educational units (Maktab/Schools) in 38 of the provinces of India. Over 1947 teachers including 295 pesh namaz are educating 50,457 children. Specially designed syllabus is designed for these schools. The organisation also runs higher religious education centres, viz. Jamiya Imamia (for boys), Jameatuz Zahra (for girls) and a chain of Khadeejatul Kubra Madrasas (for college going girls). These centres follow Hauza Syllabus. Religious educational conferences are organised by it on district, regional and provincial level. These conferences serve as short-term training camps. These conferences are not held at any fixed or permanent place but their venues are changed from time to time, so that more and more population of Shia community people can take benefit.

Ayatullah Syed Shameemul Hasan (Shameemul Millat) is the president of the organisation Sayed Safi Haidar is the current secretary of Tanzeemul Makatib.

Tanzeemul Makatib publishes various Islamic magazines too.

Maulana Syed Tehzeeb ul Hasan is the senior Islamic Scholar of Tanzeemul Makatib.

== See also ==
- Tafazzul Husain Kashmiri
- Madrasatul Waizeen
- Jamia Nazmia
- Sultanul Madaris
- Tanzeem-ul-Makatib
- Jamia Imania, Varanasi
- Syed Mohsin Nawab Rizvi
