= Sultanul Madaris =

Madrasa in Lucknow, Uttar Pradesh, India

Sultanul Madaris and Jamiya-e-Sultania
- Founders: Ayatullah Syed Abul Hasan and Iftikar ul Ulema Grand Ayatollah Sheikh Muhammad Jaffar Hasan Muhammadi
- Established: 1892
- Mission: To impart religious education to Shia Muslim students
- Focus: Jurisprudence, Theology, Literature
- Principal: Maulana Syed Mohammad Ishaq Rizvi
- Faculty: Grand Ayatollah Syed Mohammad Abul Hasan Rizvi Sanad-ul-Ulema Grand Ayatollah Sheikh Muhammad Ejaz Hasan Muhammadi Ayatollah Syed Mohammad Hadi Rizvi Ayatollah Syed Mohammad Baqir Rizvi Ayatollah Syed Mohammad Hasan Rizvi Ayatollah Syed Ali Rizvi Faqih Akbar Ayatollah Syed Mohammad Jafar Rizvi Ayatollah Syed Zainul Abidin Rizvi Professor Maulana Syed Mohammad Sulaiman Abbas Professor Maulana Syed Shabih-ul-Hasan Naunharvi Dr. Syed Mujtaba Hasan Kamunpuri Professor Maulana Ehtesham Abbas Hydari Maulana Altaf Haider
- Key people: Sanad-ul-Ulema Grand Ayatollah Sheikh Muhammad Ejaz Hasan Muhammadi Grand Ayatollah Syed Mohammad Abul Hasan Rizvi Ayatollah Syed Mohammad Hadi Rizvi Ayatollah Syed Mohammad Baqir Rizvi Faqih Akbar Ayatollah Syed Mohammad Jafar Rizvi
- Address: Madrasa Sultan-ul-Madaris, Jagat Narain Road, Lucknow-226003.
- Location: Lucknow, Uttar Pradesh, India
- Website: www.sultanulmadaris.org

The Sultan ul Madaris Urdu: سُلطان المدارس; is a Shia Islamic Madrasa (religious school) for higher religious education in Lucknow, India. Major course of studies include Jurisprudence, Theology and Islamic Literature.

== About ==
It was founded in the year 1892 by Ayatullah Syed Muhammad Abul Hasan and Iftikar ul Ulema Grand Ayatollah Sheikh Muhammad Jaffar Hasan Muhammadi (father of Sanad-ul-Ulema Grand Ayatollah Sheikh Muhammad Ejaz Hasan Muhammadi ). The extensive madrasa buildings were erected under the supervision of the Nawab Mehdi Hasan Khan, a philanthropist of Awadh. The foundation stone was laid down in 1911 and the central hall was inaugurated by the then Lieutenant-Governor of the United Provinces of Agra and Oudh Sir John Prescott Hewett. Sultanul Madaris is the second Shia religious school in Lucknow. The first one was Madrasatul Imamia - Which was closed down by the Britishers and the third being Jamia Nazmia.

== Courses ==
The following courses are offered by the Madrasa:

- Darjat Tahtaniya
- Darjat Fokaania
- Darjat-e-Aalia
- Darj-e-Sannad-ul-Afazil (Duration 3 Years)
- Darj-e-Sadar-ul-Afazil

The first two courses Darjat Tahtaniya and Darjat Fokaania consisting of seven Darjas (levels/stages) is the primary course.

== Alumni ==
Major personalities who have received education from Sultanul Madaris include, but are not limited to:

- Moulana Molvi Iftikhar Hussain Ansari
- Ayatullah Sayyid Ali Naqi Naqvi
- Atemad ul Ulema Allama Sheikh Muhammad Shabi ul Hasnain Muhammadi
- Ayatullah Al-Udhma Syed Rahat Hussain Rizvi Gopalpuri
- Ayatullah Syed Mohsin Nawab Rizvi Mujtahid,
- Hujat Ul Islam Aga Syed Mohammad Taqi Mousavi Kashmiri
- Maulana Syed Ibne Hasan Nonaharvi, Principal, Madrasatul Waizeen.
- Prof. Syed Shabihul Hasan Nonaharvi, Lucknow University., was professor and chairman of Urdu Department at Lucknow University,
- Ziya'ul Millat Maulana Mujtahid Syed Wasi Mohammad Abidi, Principal, Wasiqa Arabic College, Faizabad.
- Maulana Hafiz Kifayat Hussain.
- Hujjatul Islam Hakeem Maulana Syed Mazahir Hussain Rizvi Kararvi, Former Leader of Friday Prayers, Sultanate of Mahmudabad, Sitapur, Awadh
- Baba-e-Mantiq Maulana Syed Abdul Hussain.
- Allama Syed Ali Haider ( Sahib e Nafse Rasool)
- Maulana Ibne Hasan Karbalai, Karachi.
- Prof. Saiyid Nurul Hasan, Former Governor of West Bengal.
- Prof. Syed Suleman Abbas Rizvi, B.H.U.
- "Aqa-e-Shariat" Maulana Syed Kalbe Abid.
- Maulana Syed Hasan Rizvi, Karbala-e-Moalla, Iraq.
- Maulana Molvi Iftikhar Hussain Ansari, President All Jammu & Kashmir Shia Association
- Maulana Murtuza Husain "Fazil Lakhnavi", Lahore.
- Dr. Syed Kalbe Sadiq
- Maulana Syed Litafat Hussain Gopalpuri
- Maulana Syed Hasan Naqvi, Lucknow
- Prof. Imran Raza Rizvi.
- Maulana Syed Mohammad Mehdi Zayadpuri.
- Maulana Muhammad Mustafa Jauhar, Adeeb, Karachi.
- Maulana Ariful Millat Mufti Syed Arif Husain Rizvi Mujtahid. Ex-Principal, Sultanul Madaris, Khairpur.
- Maulana Syed Muhammad Adil Rizvi (Rizvia Karachi)
- Maulana Syed Asad Raza Rizvi Gopalpuri
- Maulana Syed Mohammad, Ex-Principal, Sultanul Madaris.
- Maulana Syed Ali, Ex-Principal, Sultanul Madaris.
- Maulana Syed Hussain, Prof. Faqihat, Jamia Sultania.
- Maulana Syed Ali Hussain, Lecturer, Faqihat, Jamia Sultania.
- Maulana Altaf Haider, Lecturer, Faqihat, Jamia Sultania.
  - Ex Principal, Madarse Aliya (Oriental College), Rampur (UP);
  - Ex Principal, Jamey Imaniya Nasirya, Jaunpur (UP);
  - Vice Principal, Sulatanul Madaris, Lucknow (UP)
- Khateeb-e-Akbar Allama Mirza Mohammed Athar (Former Principal, Shia College, Lucknow)
- Maulana Syed Abu Iftikhar Zaidi, Imam-e-Juma, Burundi.
- Maulana Aalim Husain, Shair Arabi
- Maulana Khadem Husain
- Maulana Syed Riyaz Akbar Aabedi Barahvi, Mombasa
- Maulana Mohammad Hasan Maroofi, Imam-e-Juma, Hussaini Mission, Hounslow, London
- Molana Mohammad Jafar waiz Ansari, Bani Madars e Jafarul uloom, Muzaffarnagar, Uttar Pradesh
- Syed Sadar Uddin Mosavi [Pissan Nagar, Gilgit-Baltistan]

== See also ==
- Madrasatul Waizeen
- Jamia Nazmia
- Sultanul Madaris
- Tanzeem-ul-Makatib
  - Jamia-e-Imania at Lucknow, UP.
  - Jameatuz Zahra at Lucknow, UP.
  - Madrasa Khadeejatul Kubra at Lucknow, UP.
- Jawadia Arabic College, Varanasi
- Hoza-e-Ilmiya Wasiqa, Faizabad
- Babul Ilm, Mubarakpur, Azamgarh
- Jamia Haidariya, Khairabad Mau.
