= Najmul Millat =

Najm al-Ḥasan (Urdu: نجم الحسن), also known as Najmul Millat or Najmul Ulama, (25 May 1863 – 18 April 1938) was an Islamic jurist and the founder of Jamia Nazmia, the oldest Shia religious institution of India.

== Life ==
Najmul Millat was born on 25 May 1863 (6th Dhu'l Hijjah 1279) to Akbar Hussain of Amroha. He was son of Seyyid Akbar Husain of Amroha and was a disciple and son-in-law of Syed Mohammad Abbas.

Najmul Millat studied all the higher faculties, including fiqh and Uṣūl al-fiqh in India under guidance of Syed Mohammad Abbas. He obtained degree of mujtahid from Najaf.

Najmul Millat died on 18 April 1938 (17th Safar 1361).

== Studies and services ==
Najmul Millat was a contemporary of Ziauddin al-Iraqi, Kazim Tabatabai Yazdi and Abul Hasan Isfehani. He rendered his services to the in Tibet, Burma, Africa and countries in the West through the missionaries trained in his Jamia Nazmia. He wrote several books. He trained several scholars such as Syed Sibte Hasan Naqvi, Farman Ali, Sanad-ul-Ulema Grand Ayatollah Sheikh Muhammad Ejaz Hasan Muhammadi , Mohammad Haroon, Mohammad Dawood, Kifayat Hussain, Adeel Akhtar, and Jaffer Hussain. They all did Mumtazul Afazil from Jamia Nazmia. He also:

- founded Jamia Nazmia on 2 February 1890 in Lucknow even before Nadwatul 'Ulama.
- founded of Imam-ul-Madaris Inter college in Amroha
- was one of the founders of All India Shia Conference
- was one of the founders of Shia College, Lucknow
- was one of the founders of Madrasatul Waizeen

== His progeny ==
Najmul Millat's grandson and successor Syed Muhammad Razi Mujtahid son of Syed Muhammad was a leading scholar of Fiqh and Islamic judiciary in Pakistan author of popular religious script 'Shahadat e Kubra' and subsequent works of Syed Muhammad culminating his popular literature on Islamic Fiqh 'Shariat ul Islam', also great grandson Syed Hamidul Hasan is the Principal of Jamia Nazmia and great-great-grandson Faridul Hasan, the principal of Nazmia Arabic College.
