= Kalbe Jawad =

Indian Shi'a cleric (born 1953)

Maulana Kalbe Jawad
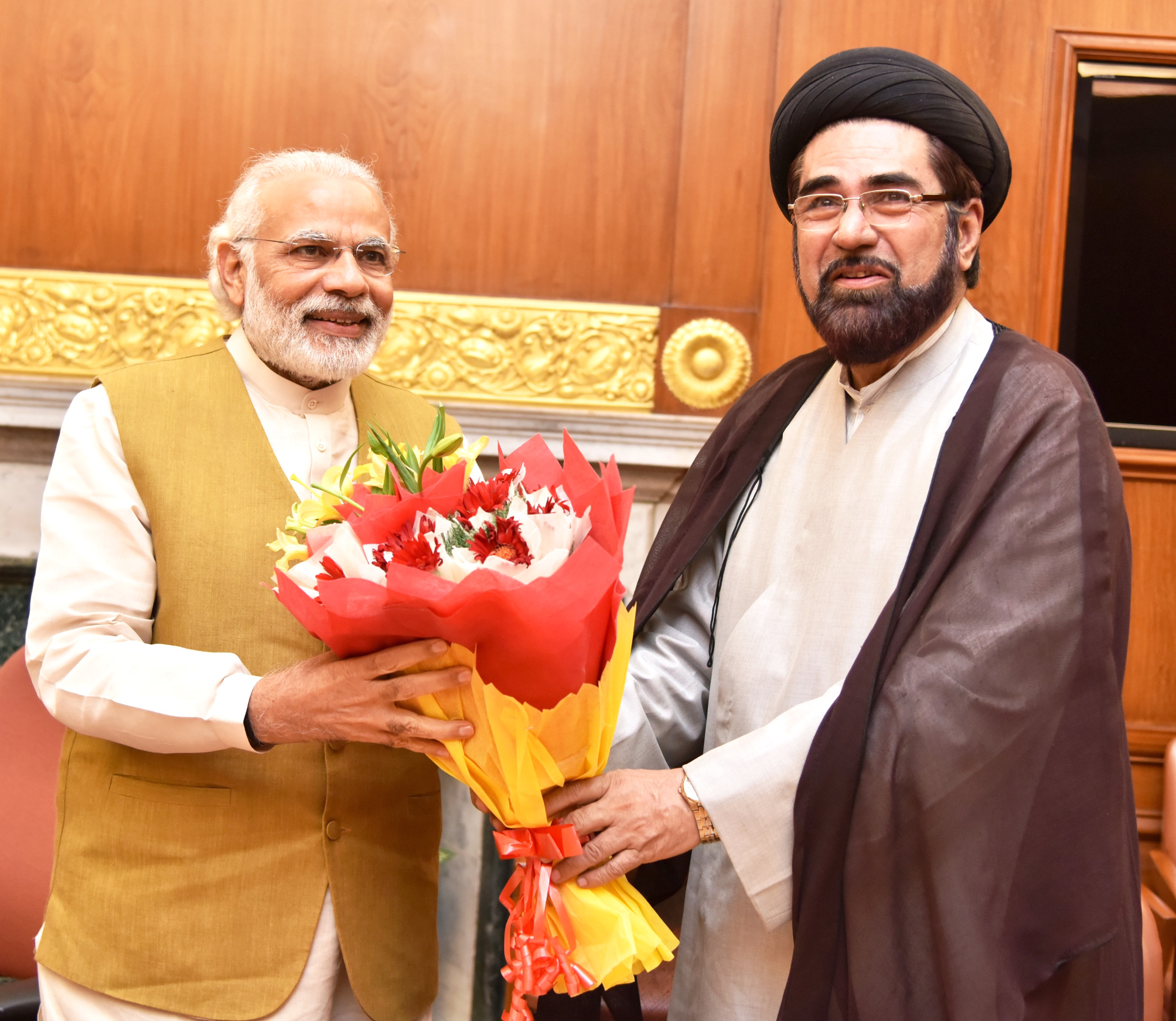
- Maulana Kalbe Jawwad, Shia Cleric, part of eminent Muslim citizens delegation calling on the Prime Minister, Narendra Modi, in New Delhi on April 13, 2016.

Personal life
- Born: 4 January 1953 (age 73) Lucknow, Uttar Pradesh, India
- Parent: Maulana Kalbe Abid (father)
- Region: Uttar Pradesh
- Other names: Jawad Miyan, Banne Miyan,
- Occupation: Imam e Jumma, Lucknow; Member of All India Muslim Personal Law Board

Religious life
- Religion: Islam

Kalbe Jawad is a Shia Muslim cleric from Lucknow, India.

== Family background ==
He comes from a family of scholars known as "Khandan-e-Ijtehad", and traces his lineage from Dildar Ali Naseerabadi (also known as Ghufran Ma'ab), their ancestors came to Jais from Sabzevar. He is son of Kalbe Abid; Kalbe Hussain was his grandfather and Kalbe Sadiq was his uncle.

== Positions and activities ==
He has held following positions:

- Imam-e-Juma (leader of the Friday prayers) at the Shahi Asafi Mosque, Lucknow.
- Senior member of All India Muslim Personal Law Board.
- Patron & chairman of the committee of "Shia Orphanage" Gulistan-e-Abutalib a.s., Lucknow.
- Member of the "Joint Ulema Council", founded after 19 February 2006.
- National President Rashtriya Shia Sufi Sangh
- General Secretary Majlis e Ulama e Hind

In June 2000 he founded an organization named Tanzeem-e-Pasdaran-e-Husain (a.s.).

=== Involvement in Azadari movement of Lucknow ===
He have been involved in azadari movement protests since 1980s, and subsequently led vigorous anti-government demonstrations at Lucknow in 1997 to lift two decades old ban on Azadari processions in Lucknow. He got arrested two times during the movement:

- He with Sunni clerics Maulana Qamar Minai and Imam Bukhari of Delhi were arrested on 3 June 1997 for organising a meeting and defying Section 144 I.P.C.
- He was again arrested on 28 June 1997 at 4:00 a.m. under National Security Act (NSA).

The government later entered into a tripartite Shias-Sunnis-Administration agreement and nine main processions on the 1st, 7th, 8th, 9th, 10th Muharrum, Chehlum, 8th Rabiul Awwal and 21st Ramzan have been restored.

=== Involvement in Waqf movement of Lucknow ===
The "Waqf Movement" or Tehreek-e-Awqaf which was going on in Lucknow under his leadership had achieved significant success in Lucknow and Delhi (with Dargah e Shah Mardan case). He had been demanding CBI inquiry into the corruption taken place in UP Shia Central Waqf Board from a very long time. The governments gave assurance only.

=== Involvement in demonstrations and rallies ===
He held an anti US/Israel/Denmark rally at Lucknow which was attended by over one million people.

=== Execution of Nimr al-Nimr ===
In an interview condemning the execution of Nimr al-Nimr in Saudi Arabia which was posted on the Internet on 3 January 2016 (as translated by MEMRI), Jawad accused Israel and the United States to be involved in the execution, stating that: "Israeli and American hands are involved in [the execution of Sheikh Al-Nimr in Saudi Arabia] and so are other Arab countries, which have unleashed cruelty on the minorities, and are supporting and backing terrorism. They are all involved in this. They don't want any voices to be raised against terrorism."

=== Wahhabism and Jews ===
In the same interview Jawad compared practitioners of Wahhabism in Saudi Arabia to Jews, stating that: "This is the path of the Jews. According to their Talmud, none but the Jews have the right to live. The Jewish mentality and the Wahhabi mentality are one and the same. That is why we say that there is no difference between the Saudis and the Jews. Their policies are the same, and they support one another. In fact, the Jews are their patrons."

His views on Yogi Adityanath:

In March 2023, he says only Yogi Adityanath can uplift the Shias of Uttar Pradesh.
