= Atawan =

Atawan Atāwān
- Village
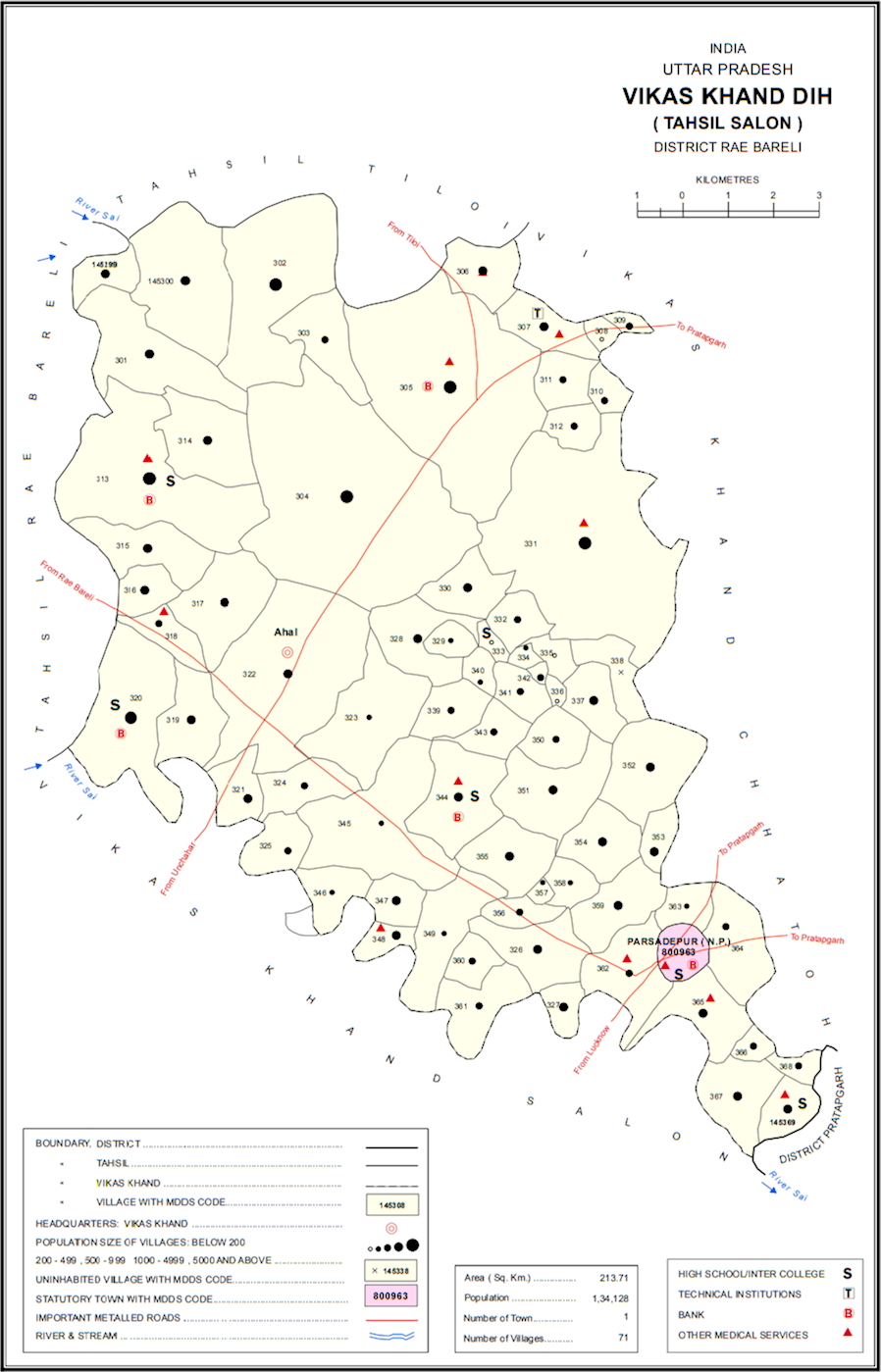
- Map showing Atawan (#352) in Dih CD block

- Location in Uttar Pradesh, India
- Coordinates: 26.114872°N 81.490544°E
- Country: India
- State: Uttar Pradesh
- District: Raebareli

Area
  - Total: 2.858 km^{2} (1.103 sq mi)

Population (2011)
  - Total: 2,108
  - Density: 737.6/km^{2} (1,910/sq mi)

Languages
  - Official: Hindi
- Time zone: UTC+5:30 (IST)
- Vehicle registration: UP-35

Atawan is a village in Dih block of Rae Bareli district, Uttar Pradesh, India. It is located 32 km from Raebareli, the district headquarters. As of 2011, it has a population of 2,108 people, in 346 households. It has one primary school and no healthcare facilities, and it does not host a permanent market or a weekly haat. It is the headquarters of a nyaya panchayat, which also includes 9 other villages.

The 1951 census recorded Atawan as comprising 5 hamlets, with a total population of 793 people (419 male and 374 female), in 163 households, and 159 physical houses. The area of the village was given as 886 acres. 22 residents were literate, all male. The village was listed as belonging to the pargana of Parshadepur and the thana of Nasirabad.

The 1961 census recorded Atawan as comprising 5 hamlets, with a total population of 670 people (368 male and 302 female), in 158 households, and 143 physical houses. The area of the village was given as 886 acres and it had electricity at that point.

The 1981 census recorded Atawan as having a population of 1,282 people, in 273 households, and having an area of 358.56 hectares. The main staple foods were listed as wheat and rice.

The 1991 census recorded Atawan as having a total population of 1,456 people (739 male and 717 female), in 372 households and 372 physical houses. The area of the village was listed as 367 hectares. Members of the 0-6 age group numbered 311, or 21% of the total; this group was 49% male (151) and 51% female (160). Members of scheduled castes made up 37% of the village's population, while no members of scheduled tribes were recorded. The literacy rate of the village was 27% (287 men and 108 women). 402 people were classified as main workers (395 men and 7 women), while 187 people were classified as marginal workers (all women); the remaining 767 residents were non-workers. The breakdown of main workers by employment category was as follows: 328 cultivators (i.e. people who owned or leased their own land); 51 agricultural labourers (i.e. people who worked someone else's land in return for payment); 0 workers in livestock, forestry, fishing, hunting, plantations, orchards, etc.; 0 in mining and quarrying; 0 household industry workers; 3 workers employed in other manufacturing, processing, service, and repair roles; 1 construction worker; 2 employed in trade and commerce; 5 employed in transport, storage, and communications; and 12 in other services.
