= Syed Mohammad Waris Hasan Naqvi =

20th and 21st-century Indian Muslim cleric

Syed Mohammad Waris Hasan Naqvi Nasirabadi
- Title: Hujjatul Islam wal Muslameen, Maulana

Personal life
- Born: 1932/33 Lucknow, India
- Died: 11 May 2008 Lucknow, India
- Era: Modern era
- Region: India, Iraq, United Kingdom
- Main interest: Nahjul Balagha
- Notable work(s): A Critical Study Of Nahj Al-Balagha (His Doctoral thesis on Nahj al-Balagha submitted for the degree of Doctor of Philosophy at the University of Edinburgh), One of the contributors of Shi'ite Islam

Religious life
- Religion: Islam
- Jurisprudence: Jafari
- Creed: Usuli Twelver Shia Islam

Muslim leader
- Influenced by: Syed Sibte Hasan Naqvi

Syed Mohammad Waris Hasan Naqvi Nasirabadi (born 1932/33 died 11 May 2008) was a Shia Muslim cleric from Lucknow, Uttar Pradesh, India.

== Family background ==
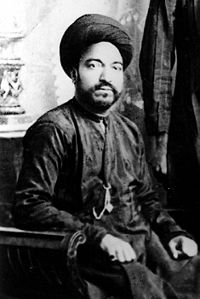
Shams-ul-Ulema Maulana Syed Sibte Hasan Naqvi father of Waris Hasan

Syed Sibte Hasan Naqvi was father of Waris Hasan. His last name "Naqvi" indicates he is one of the direct descendants of the Islamic prophet Muhammad through the lineage of the Imam Ali al-Naqi, he belonged to the Nasirabadi sub-branch of Naqvis of Darul Ijtihad Jais and Nasirabad. Waris Hasan comes from Khandan-e-Ijtihad a notable family of Shia Muslim clerics of erstwhile Oudh State whose Ayatollah Syed Dildar Ali Naseerabadi Ghufran-Ma'ab Naseerabadi was Waris's ancestor.

Waris Hasan's daughter Wasfia Hasan Naqvi teaches English in Shia College, Lucknow and is also a poet and a writer.

== Studies ==
He spent many years in Islamic seminaries in India and Iraq and lived in the United Kingdom and obtained a doctorate in Islamic studies, a PhD (Doctor of Philosophy) from the University of Edinburgh, Scotland. "A Critical Study Of Nahj Al-Balagha" was his Doctoral thesis on Nahj al-Balagha which he had submitted for the degree of Doctor of Philosophy at the University of Edinburgh, the thesis was reviewed by Dr. I. K. A. Howard.

== Career ==
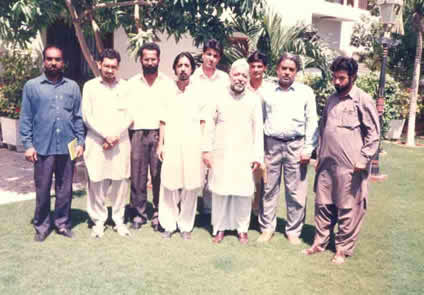
Waris Hasan (with cap)

He was principal of Shia College, Lucknow and Madrasatul Waizeen, Lucknow. He was also mutwalli (caretaker) of 'Waqf Shamsul Ulema Maulana Syed Sibte Hasan Naqvi' .

== Death ==
He died at his residence in old Lucknow on Sunday 11 May 2008 after a prolonged illness. He was buried at Imambara Ghufran Ma'ab in Lucknow, where his cousin Kalbe Sadiq addressed the mourning gathering. Other dignitaries who attended the mourning ceremony include Syed Sibtey Razi.

== Academic works ==
- Hasan published in the field of Islamic studies and a specialist on Nahj al-Balagha,
- He authored "Some of the Aspects of the Event of Karbala", 1976.
- He also authored "Essays on the Life and Times of 'Ali b. Abi Talib", 1976-77.
- He translated 'A Study of Prophethood' along-with I.K.A. Howard, 1975-83.
- He is one of the contributors of Shi'ite Islam, a text on the history and thought of Shi'a Islam (he co-authored Chapter 4 The Shi'i Interpretation of Hadith Literature), he worked and co-authored it with Muhammad Husayn Tabatabaei, Seyyed Hossein Nasr and Hamid Dabashi, 1979.
