= Nasirabad, Raebareli =

Nasirabad
- Village
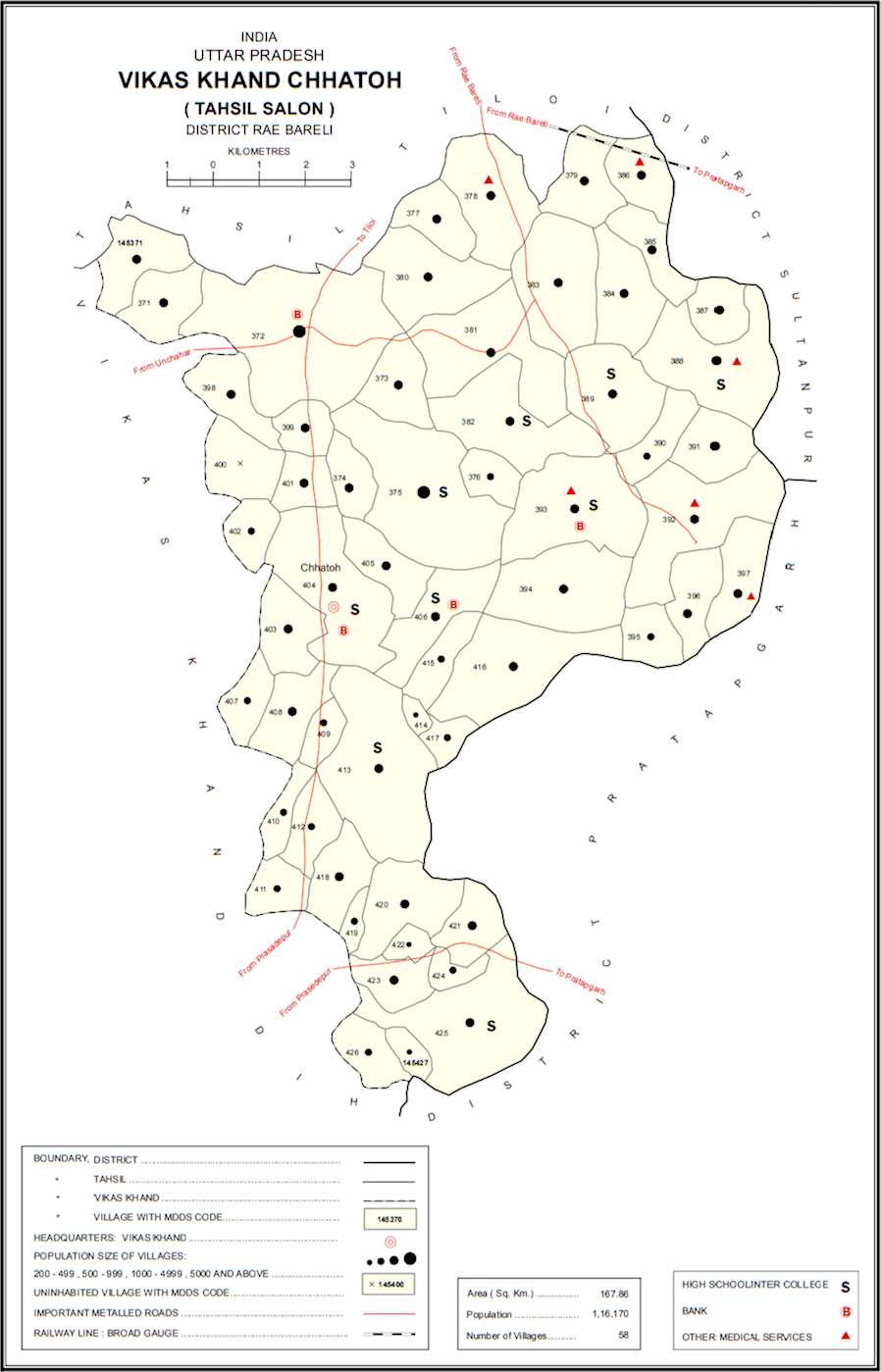
- Map showing Nasirabad (#372) in Chhatoh CD block

- Location in Uttar Pradesh, India Nasirabad (India)
- Coordinates: 26.25°N 81.53°E
- Country: India
- State: Uttar Pradesh
- District: Raebareli

Area
  - Total: 9.379 km^{2} (3.621 sq mi)
- Elevation: 101 m (331 ft)

Population (2011)
  - Total: 13,648
  - Density: 1,455/km^{2} (3,769/sq mi)

Languages
  - Official: Urdu, Hindi
- Time zone: UTC+5:30 (IST)
- PIN: 229307
- Telephone code: 91-5313
- Vehicle registration: UP-33
- Sex ratio: 1082 ♂/♀

Nasirabad is a Nagar panchayat (a municipality, divided into 15 wards) and a Gram Sabha (village council) in Chhatoh Block, Raebareli district in the state of Uttar Pradesh, India. It was declared a Nagar Panchayat (settlement in transition from rural to urban) in 2017. Located southeast of Jais on the road to Salon, Nasirabad is an old town partly built on an elevated area that covers the ruins of an ancient fort. It is one of the main Muslim centres in the district. Muslims make up about half the town's population, and the Shia and Sunni communities are both prominent. As of 2011, Nasirabad's population is 13,648, in 2,243 households. It is located 37 km from Raebareli the district headquarters. It is the headquarters of a nyaya panchayat that also includes 6 other villages.

== Name and history ==
There are three different accounts of Nasirabad's naming. One is that the town is named after Nasir-ud-Din Humayun, who built a masonry fort here; another ascribes both the naming and the fort to Ibrahim Shah of the Jaunpur Sultanate, who supposedly named the town after his son Nasir-ud-Din. A third account holds that the town was founded by a Sayyid named Zikria who came from Jais and named the place after his grandfather Nasir-ud-Din. In any case, though, the place was inhabited by Hindu locals before the Muslim town was founded.

When the railway came to the area, although it bypassed Nasirabad itself, the commercial importance of the town increased significantly, and the population of Nasirabad increased dramatically in the late 1800s. At the turn of the 20th century, Nasirabad was described as "a rising town" that was almost completely surrounded by orchards. It had a police station, which had been moved here from Mau in 1900, as well as a post office and a large primary school. There were then four bazars: the Qila bazar, Taqiganj, Husainganj, and Riasatganj. The town was divided into 6 mahals, of which 4 were held by the Sayyid descendants of Sayyid Zikria and the other 2 were held by Kayasths.

The 1951 census recorded Nasirabad as comprising 20 hamlets, with a total population of 4,665 people (2,340 male and 2,325 female), in 997 households and 962 physical houses. The area of the village was given as 2,317 acres. 497 residents were literate, 378 male and 119 female. The village was listed as belonging to the pargana of Rokha; it was also the headquarters of a thana covering 114 villages in the tehsil of Salon and 6 more in the tehsil of Raebareli. Nasirabad had a primary school with 150 students as of 1951.

The 1961 census recorded Nasirabad as comprising 23 hamlets, with a total population of 5,107 people (2,551 male and 2,556 female), in 1,119 households and 1,096 physical houses. The area of the village was given as 2,317 acres, and it had electricity, a medical practitioner, and a post office at that point. The Nasirabad police force consisted of 2 sub-inspectors, 3 head constables, and 27 constables as of 1961. There were the following small industrial establishments at the time: 5 grain mills, 1 beedi manufacturer, 4 textile manufacturers, 2 bicycle repair shops, and 5 makers of jewellery and/or other precious metal items. Average attendance of the Dussehra fair was about 2,000 people at the time. Nasirabad was at that time the headquarters of a community development block comprising 79 villages and 507 hamlets, with a total population of 73,810 people.

The 1981 census recorded Nasirabad as having a population of 6,883 people, in 1,672 households, and having an area of 937.66 hectares. The main staple foods were listed as wheat and rice.

The 1991 census recorded Nasirabad as having a total population of 8,605 people (4,520 male and 4,085 female), in 1,513 households and 1,508 physical houses. The area of the village was listed as 938 hectares. Members of the 0-6 age group numbered 1,817, or 21.2% of the total; this group was 52% male (949) and 48% female (868). Members of scheduled castes made up 26.2% of the village's population, while no members of scheduled tribes were recorded. The literacy rate of the village was 20% (1,336 men and 410 women). 2,707 people were classified as main workers (2,402 men and 305 women), while 417 people were classified as marginal workers (22 men and 395 women); the remaining 5,481 residents were non-workers. The breakdown of main workers by employment category was as follows: 989 cultivators (i.e. people who owned or leased their own land); 907 agricultural labourers (i.e. people who worked someone else's land in return for payment); 10 workers in livestock, forestry, fishing, hunting, plantations, orchards, etc.; 0 in mining and quarrying; 25 household industry workers; 168 workers employed in other manufacturing, processing, service, and repair roles; 4 construction workers; 246 employed in trade and commerce; 17 employed in transport, storage, and communications; and 341 in other services.

== Geography ==
Nasirabad is located at 26.25°N 81.53°E. It has an average elevation of 101 metres (331 feet).

== Demographics ==
As of 2001 Indian census, Nasirabad had a population of 9,353. Males constitute 52% of the population and females 48%. Nasirabad has an average literacy rate of 40%, male literacy is 48%, and female literacy is 30%.

== Religion ==
The town has two grand old buildings of archaeological importance, which are called Imambargahs.

Nasirabad also has an old shiv mandir (Hindu temple to Shiva).

Muharram is observed in Nasirabad with great fervour. Matami Juloos (mourning processions for the death of Imam Hussain) take place from the 1st to the 10th day of the month, with recitation of Nauhas (elegies) and self-flagellation with chains.

Nasirabad hosts a Dussehra festival on Asvina Sudi 15, involving dramatic reenactments from the Ramayana. Vendors bring various everyday items to sell at the fair.

== Sadaat of Nasirabad ==
One of the earliest settlements of Naqvis is from Nasirabd. Naqvi Sadats (descendants of Muhammad) migrated from Subzwar (Iran) and settled in Jais around 410 Hijri (around 1027 AD). After some time the adjacent village of Patakpur was also inhabited by Momineens and renamed Nasirabad after Syed Naseerudin. Nasirabad are the earliest known Naqvi Sadats of India. Nasirabad are the native land of Khandan e Ijtihad and many high-ranking scholars have come from there. The 1st Mujtahid from India, Ayatullah il Uzma Sayyid Dildar Ali Naqvi Naseerabadi 'Gufraanmaab' was from here and later his family came to be called "Khandan e Ijtihad" due to the heavy presence of high-ranking scholars. Some famous and known religious scholars from this lineage include Syed Sibte Hasan Naqvi and Syed Mohammad Waris Hasan Naqvi.

== Notable people from Nasirabad ==
- Syed Nasiruddin, 14th-century Sufi saint and military leader, after whom the town is named
- Allama Syed Dildar Ali Naqvi Naseerabadi

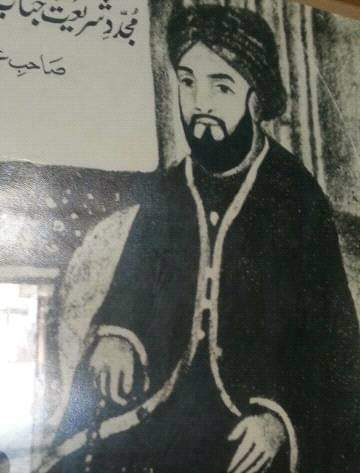
Old Photo of Dildar Ali Naqvi Nasirabadi Ghufranmab

- Syed-ul-Ulama Ayatullah Syed Ali Naqi Naqvi
- Maulana Syed Kalbe Hussain
- Maulana Syed Kalbe Abid
- Maulana Syed Dr. Kalbe Sadiq
