= Syed Sibte Hasan Naqvi =

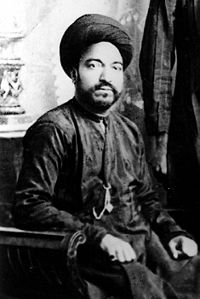
- Shams-ul-Ulema Maulana Syed Sibte Hasan Naqvi
- Title: Khatib-E-Azam, Shams-ul-Ulema, Maulana

Personal life
- Died: 1935 Lucknow, U.P., British India
- Era: Modern era
- Notable idea: New format of Majlis-e-Aza

Religious life
- Religion: Islam
- Jurisprudence: Ja`fari
- Creed: Usuli Twelver Shi`a Islam

Muslim leader
- Influenced by: Najm al-Hasan Namjmul Millat
- Influenced: Ayatullah Syed Ali Shabbar Naqvi, Syed Ibne Hasan Nonaharvi, Syed Mohammad Waris Hasan Naqvi

Syed Sibte Hasan Naqvi (مولانا سيد سبط حسن نقوى) (d. 1935) was a Shia cleric from Lucknow, Uttar Pradesh, India. He was known by the title of Khatib-E-Azam (Great Orator).

== Family background ==
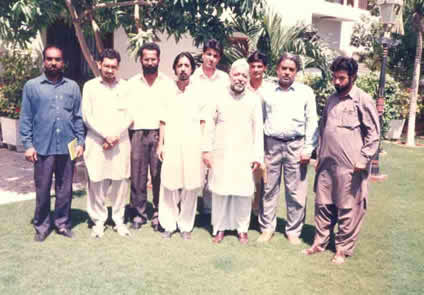
Waris Hasan(with cap), son of Sibte Hasan

His last name "Naqvi" indicates he is one of the direct descendants of the Islamic prophet Muhammad through the lineage of the Imam Ali al-Naqi, he belonged to Nasirabadi sub-branch of Naqvis of Darul Ijtihad Jais and Nasirabad. Waris Hasan comes from Khandan-e-Ijtihad a notable family of Shia Muslim clerics of erstwhile Oudh State whose Ayatollah Syed Dildar Ali Naseerabadi Ghufran-Ma'ab Naseerabadi was Sibte's ancestor.

Syed Sibte Hasan Naqvi had a son named Syed Mohammad Waris Hasan Naqvi. Waris Hasan too was a Shia cleric and held position of Principals of institutions like Shia College, Lucknow and Madrasatul Waizeen, Lucknow.

== Studies ==
He trained several Ulama such Kifayat Hussain, Adeel Akhtar, and Jaffer Hussain. He did Mumtazul Afazil from Jamia Nazmia where Ayatullah Najm al-Hasan Namjmul Millat was his teacher. Sibte Hasan was also the teacher of Maulana Ibne Hasan Nonaharvi.

== Public life ==
He was most famous for refining the style of Muharram majlis to the format used today, most notably in the Urdu language. Before his time, majalises in Lucknow and other places contained marsiya, recited by great poets like Mir Anees and Mirza Dabeer. The new format has Khutba in Arabic, some tafseer, fazail of Ahlul Bayt and then masaeb of Karbala.

He has composed nauhey under pen-name Fatir Jaisi, the collection has been published as 'Hamd e Rabbul Arbaab' and Nauhe by Noore Hidayat Foundation, Lucknow.

He was one of the leading advocates of the Shia College campaign.

He created a waqf Shamsul Ulema Maulana Syed Sibte Hasan Naqvi on 10 April 1933, of which Waris Hasan his son became mutwalli (caretaker).

Justine Jones has described Maulana as,

a scholar who carried the twin distinctions of being one of the best known majlis deliverers of the early decades of the century. Encapsulating the orientation of many ulema towards the task of public communication, he earned the title of Khatib-E-Azam (Great Orator).

— Justine Jones, "Shia Islam in Colonial India", Shia Islam in Colonial India

Maulana Sibte Hasan was in all reality perfected in oratory, and oratory was perfected in him. The mimber(pulpit) was given grace by him and he was its grace. If the skill of remembrance had come from heavens, then he gave it the greatest throne.

— Justine Jones, "Khatib-i-al-i-Muhammad", Documents of Imamia Mission (pg.61)
