= Shia College, Lucknow =

College in Lucknow, Uttar Pradesh, India

Shia College
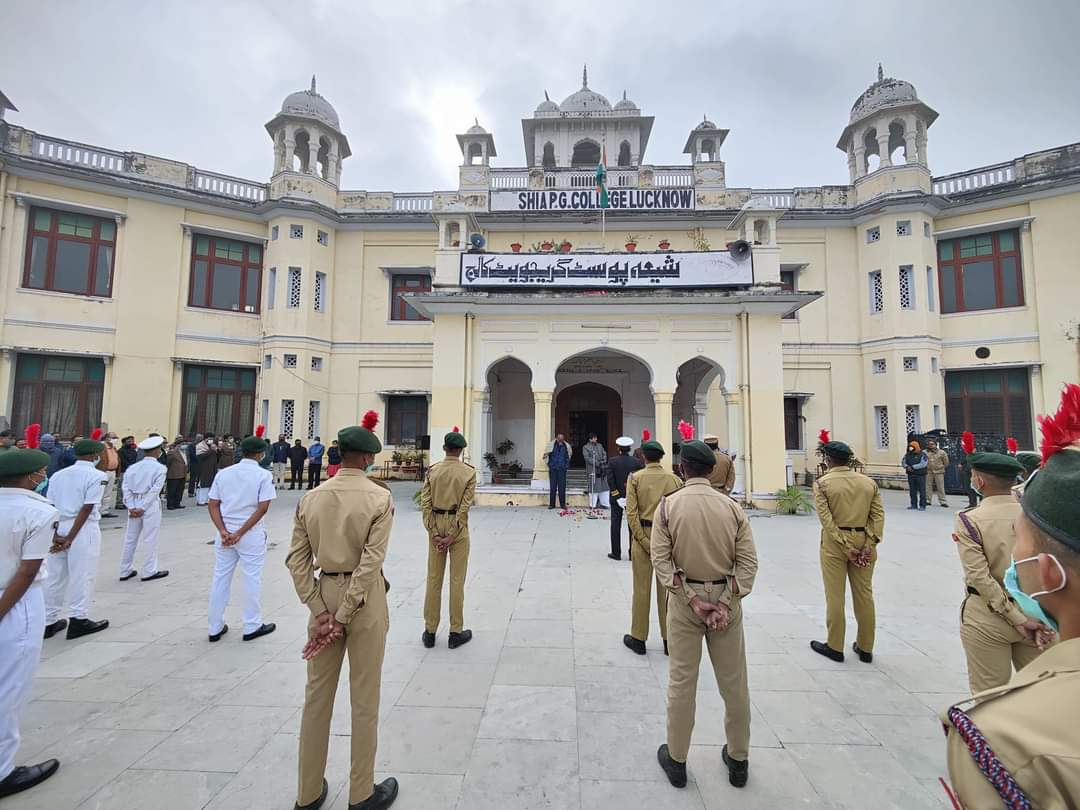
- Motto in English: "I am the city of learning and Ali is its gate"
- Type: Minority
- Established: October 25, 1919; 106 years ago
- Affiliations: Lucknow University
- Location: Lucknow, Uttar Pradesh, India
- Campus: Urban
- Website: shiacollege.org & shiapgcollege.ac.in

Shia College is a college located in old Lucknow, Uttar Pradesh, India. It is affiliated with the University of Lucknow and one of the institutes of higher education in India.

== Overview ==
Shia college was established in 1919. Over a period of 100 years of its existence the college has contributed immensely to Indian society with its impressive alumni comprising academics, politicians, bureaucrats and other distinguished citizens. Although The college was established just a year before the Lucknow University came into existence, it was initially affiliated to Allahabad University. The College consists of two teaching campuses viz, Sitapur Road Campus and Victoria Street Campus.

== Brief history ==
The idea of starting a Shia College was formulated in AISC's 1910 session, the scheme was floated in March 1914 and the decision of starting a degree college at Lucknow was taken in 1915. In 1917 Governor James Meston laid foundation stone for it, and it was completed between 1928 and 1934. Donations came from all members of Shia community, the major shares from, taluqedars & clergy like Nawab Kazilbash (Shia College was his brainchild), Nawab Rampur, Raja Mahmudabad (he was initially opposed to idea of Shia College), Najmul Hasan, Sanad-ul-Ulema Grand Ayatollah Sheikh Muhammad Ejaz Hasan Muhammadi etc. Shia College was established on 25 October 1917.

But due to government restrictions it initially started functioning as a school in the premises of Bada Imambara in 1919. In 1922 it became Intermediate College, teaching started with subjects in Humanities and Social Sciences while Natural Sciences was introduced in 1932. In 1947 the college was allowed to start degree classes in science, when the University of Lucknow decided to permit the teaching of Science outside the premises of Canning College, Lucknow. Later on Bachelor in 1960, Bachelor of Laws in 1970, Bachelor of Commerce in 1972, B.Sc. Computer Science in 1989. The College attained Post-Graduate level in 1995 with M.A. in Urdu; later on M.A. in Sociology in 1996, M.Com. in Applied Economics in 2005, M.Sc. in Zoology and M.Com.in Pure Commerce in 2006, M.A. in Journalism & Mass Communication in 2007, M.Sc./M.A. in Statistics in 2008. Professional management course Bachelor of Business Administration in International Business was started in 2005.

== College administration ==
The college administration comprises,

- Board of Trustees
- Managing Committee
- College Committee
- SHIACTA
- Procotorial Board

== Accreditation ==
Shia P.G. College has been awarded an 'A' grade by the National Assessment and Accreditation Council (NAAC).

== Notable principals & board members ==
=== Principals ===
- Syed Sibte Hasan Naqvi (d. 1935), ex-principal
- Syed Mohammad Waris Hasan Naqvi (d. 11 May 2008), ex-principal

=== Board members ===
- Syed Ali Zaheer (1896-1983), president of the College Management Committee
- Syed Muzaffar Husain Rizvi (1932 – Dec 1987), founding member of the governing board
- Sanad-ul-Ulema Grand Ayatollah Sheikh Muhammad Ejaz Hasan Muhammadi (1919 - March 1932), founding member
- Syed Ali Nasir Saeed Abaqati, ex-board member
- Syed Husain Nasir Saeed Abqati sahab ansar abqati.board member and senior member of management committee Shia PG College and allied institutions
