= Nawab Fateh Ali Khan Kazilbash =

Landlord from Lahore, Punjab, British India

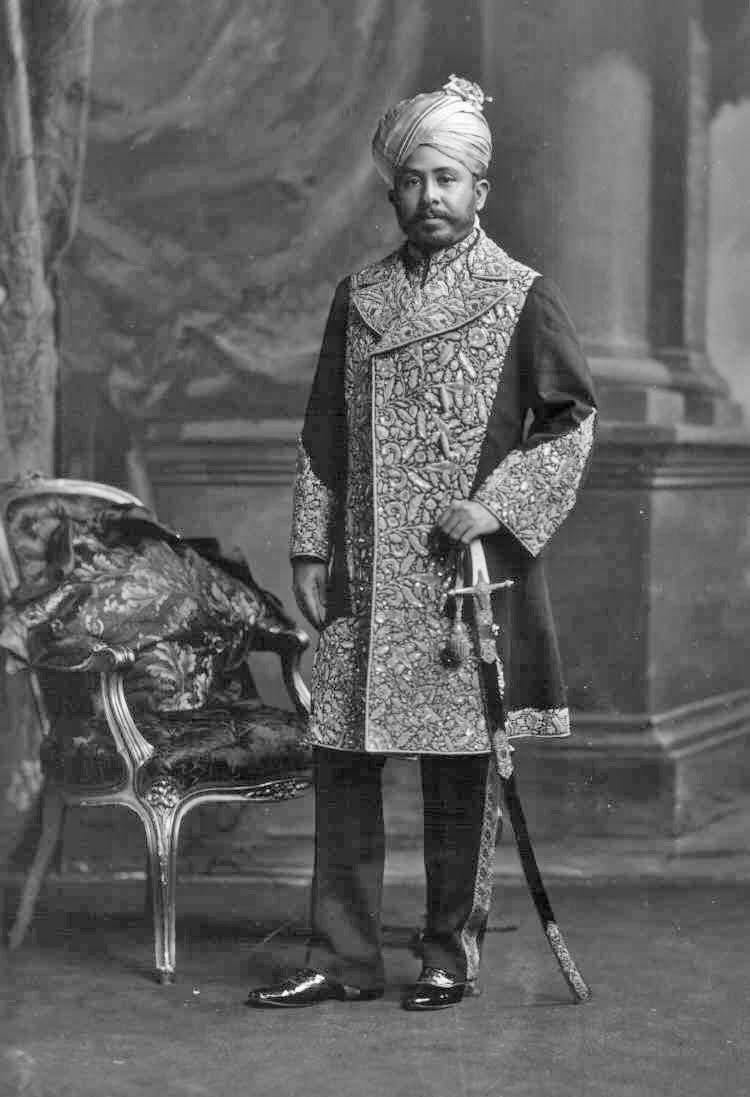

Nawab Sir Fateh Ali Khan Kazilbash (1862 – 28 October 1923) KCIE was a landlord from Lahore, Punjab during the British Raj.

== Biography ==
He was born in 1862, the son of Nisar Ali Khan, and a grandson of Ali Raza Khan. In 1895 he assisted the government during the Chitral Expedition, succeeding in inducing a large number of border tribes to be friendly to the Government of India. As a reward he was granted 2000 acres of land in the Chenab colony for his followers. He was elected to the Punjab Legislative Council and represented the Punjab in the Famine Conference of 1897. In 1898 he succeeded his uncle Nawab Sir Nawazish Ali Khan as head of the Qizilbash clan. In 1902, he was chosen to represent the Punjab at the Coronation of King Edward VII and Queen Alexandra.

He was elected to the Council of India in 1904 as a non-official member representing the United Provinces of Agra and Oudh. In 1914 he promulgated idea of Shia College, Lucknow. During the First World War he donated 22,000 rupees along with other contributions to the war effort. He was made a Knight Commander of the Indian Empire in 1921. He died on 28 October 1923.
