= Muhammad Mustafa Jauhar =

Pakistani scholar and writer (1895–1995)

Muhammad Mustafa Jauhar محمد مصطفٰی جوہر
- Born: 10 May 1895; Bengal Presidency, British India
- Died: 24 October 1985 (aged 90)

Philosophical work
- Era: Modern era
- Region: Islamic scholar
- School: Shia
- Main interests: Islamic law, Islamic philosophy and Quranic exegesis
- Notable ideas: Evolution of Islamic philosophy

Muhammad Mustafa Jauhar (Urdu: محمد مصطفٰی جوہر) (10 May 1895 – 24 October 1985) was a Pakistani scholar, religious leader, public speaker, poet and philosopher.

== Biography ==
Jauhar was born in Bihar, India. He was the eldest son of Hakeem Muhammad Muslim, who used to run his clinic in Bhagalpur during 1910, where Jauhar studied in an English School. Later he gained admission to Sultanul Madaris, and completed his education from Sultanul Madaris Lucknow in 1923.

== Madrassa Abbasia (Patna, British India) ==
Madrassa Abbasia was inaugurated in 1923 by Muhammad Baqir. Jauhar was appointed as its first Naib Mudarris-e-Alla in August 1925. He became Mudarris-e-Alla of the madrassa in January 1926. He called Abul Hassan to Patna and appointed him as the Naib Mudarris-e- Alla in the Madrassa.

== English ==
Jauhar had a good command of the English language. Once, when he was afflicted with an itching skin disease, he felt that he could not remain ritually pure, so he restrained himself from studying the Quran and other religious books for some time. Instead he decided to read an English translation of Alif Laila. By the time he recovered from the disease he had already finished the book and strengthened his expertise in English.

== Literary work ==
Study was the essence of Jauhari's life. He was considered an authority on Uloom-e-Falsafa o mantaq & Sufi metaphysics. He wrote many books, including:

- Tauheed o adal Nahj al-Balagha ki raushani main
- Aqaid-e-Jaafria
- Asool-e-Jaafria
- Saboot-e-Khuda
- Janab kay tareekhi khutba fidak ka tarjuma which is included in Seerat-e-Fatima Zahra by Agha Sultan Ahmad Mirza
- Translation of Al-Ghadir (Volume 1)

== See also ==
- Talib Jauhari
