= Syed Ibne Hasan Nonaharvi =

Indian cleric (1899–1980)

Syed Ibne Hasan Nonaharvi alias Maulana Nonaharvi
- Title: Naadiratul Zaman

Personal life
- Born: 1899 Nonahara, Ghazipur, North-Western Provinces, British India
- Died: 1980 (aged 80–81) Lucknow, Uttar Pradesh, India
- Era: Modern era
- Main interest(s): meraj, Battles of Islam (involving Muhammad & Ali); Nahjul Balagha, Arabic, usool, fiqh
- Notable idea: New format of Majlis-e-Aza

Religious life
- Religion: Islam
- Jurisprudence: Ja`fari
- Creed: Usuli Twelver Shi`a Islam

Muslim leader
- Influenced by: Syed Sibte Hasan Naqvi

Syed Ibne Hasan Nunahrvi (or Nonaharvi or Nonaharavi or Naunahrvi or Naunaharvi) (نادرة الزمن مولانا سيد ابن حسن نونهروى)(1899-1980), was an Indian Shia Muslim cleric, orator and scholar.

== As student & teacher ==
=== Studies ===
He went to Islamic school in Nonahara, Ghazipur, UP, India and then moved to Lucknow for higher Shia religious education. He graduated from Sultanul Madaris.

Maulana Nonaharvi was a student of Allama Syed Ahmad Raza Saheb, Baqirul Uloom Maulana Syed Mohammad Baqir Saheb, and Nasirul Millat Syed Nasir Husain Moosavi Kintoori, Allama Syed Sibte Hasan Naqvi, etc.

=== In academics ===
He continued teaching at Sultanul Madaris and then became Principal of Madrasatul Waizeen, where he was known for his teachings of Nahjul Balagha, Arabic, usool, fiqh and guided his students to become great reciter.

== As orator ==
Maulana Syed Ibne Hasan Nunahrvi was renowned for his oratory and Urdu language speeches. He was a pious and sincere scholar with tremendous control over religious matters and reciting majlis.

Maulana Nunahrvi learned the art of oratory from his teacher Allama Syed Sibte Hasan Naqvi, who was the pioneer of the format of majalis which are recited to the present day. Before their time, majalis in Lucknow and other places contained marsiya, recited by great poets like Meer Babbar Ali Anees and Mirza Dabeer. The new format had khutba in Arabic, some tafseer with fazail of Ahlul Bayt lastly masaeb of Karbala.

Maulana Nunahrvi was known for his ability to deliver difficult tafseer and Islamic philosophy. He was known for his oration on the topic of meraj and the battles of Islam (involving Muhammad & Ali). His description of the battlefield and meraj had such an effect on people that the description was said to take the imagination of the listener into the event itself. He traveled a lot and was able to recite a single majalis for 4 hours, not repeating the same topic twice. His vocabulary, control over Persian, Urdu, and Arabic languages, and usage of exemplary sentences with proper qafia and continuous flow with "Gul o Bulbul", control over his audience and making topics interesting made him extremely popular and known all over the sub-continent. He was an expert orator and recited long majalis with excellent delivery of words, and was also known as an orator who used to ask his audience to recite salawat more than 100 times in a single majlis.

Many of his followers used to travel long distance to listen to his majalis and had great affection for his recitations. Maulana was known for reciting esale sawab majalis due to his choice of Ayat for the deceased person. He chose Surah Nun for easale sawab majlis of the founder of Nizami Press, Lucknow who spent all his life writing and printing books. Maulana recited majlis e tarheem for Nasirul Millat and many prominent people and always ensured fazail and masaib of masoomeen consoles the grieving family.

Allama Nunahrvi started his career at Husainia Irshadia, Rudauli by invitation of Syed Irshad Husain Zaidi(d.1954) and remained a permanent zakir there for 58 years until his death. For 58 years, he recited majalis and mahafil in front of leaned audience and never repeated any majlis. Chaudhry Irshad's cousin brother Ali Muhammad Zaidi(1914-2004) authored a books named Ibne Hasan aur Rudauli.

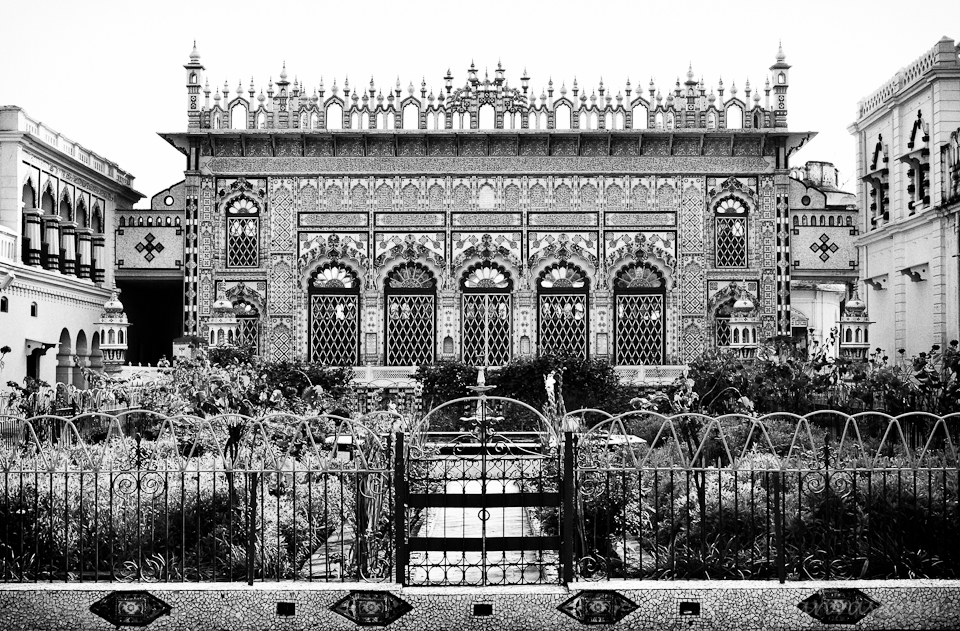
Husainia Irshadia, Rudauli

Husainia Irshadia, Rudauli

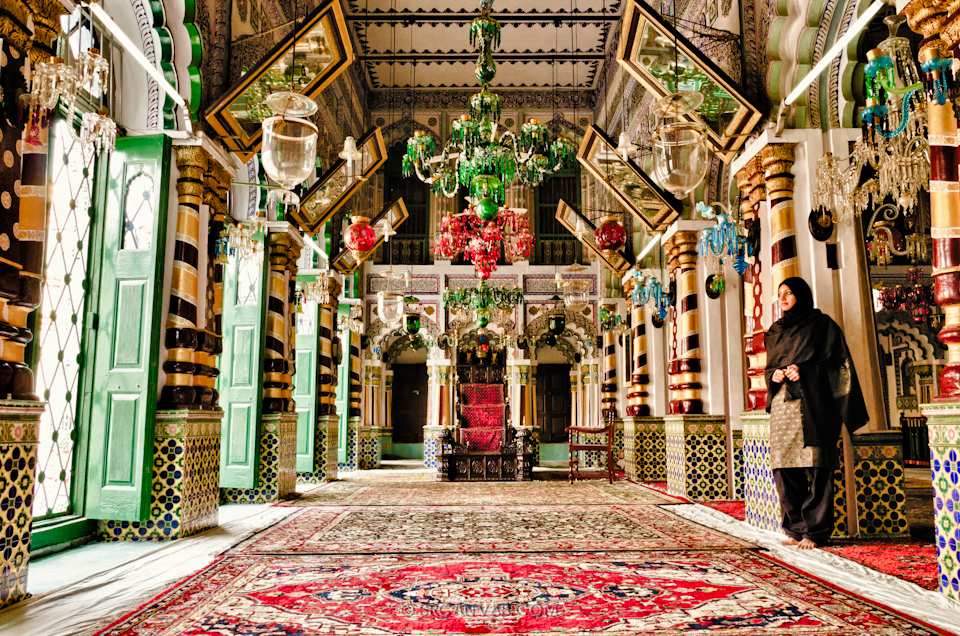
Inside Husainia Irshadia, Rudauli

Inside Husainia Irshadia, Rudauli

Once he asked his host to name the ayat of his choice when he goes on pulpit and recited the majlis in his well known manner. In one majlis he described the incident - Muhammad asked Salman and Abu Zar to go and get Ali as he was suffering from eye infection, late Maulana said the following when both companions were coming back supporting Ali in the middle:

Ek taraf jaushan kabir
Ek taraf jaushan sagheer
Beech me janabe ameer

He also addressed majalis at Hyderabad, Rampur, Jalali, Lucknow and many other places.

He gave speech at Bismillah ceremony of eldest sister's son of Rahi Masoom Raza (they called Nunahrvi Khalu Miyan) on 3rd Shaban where Qais Zangipuri too was present.

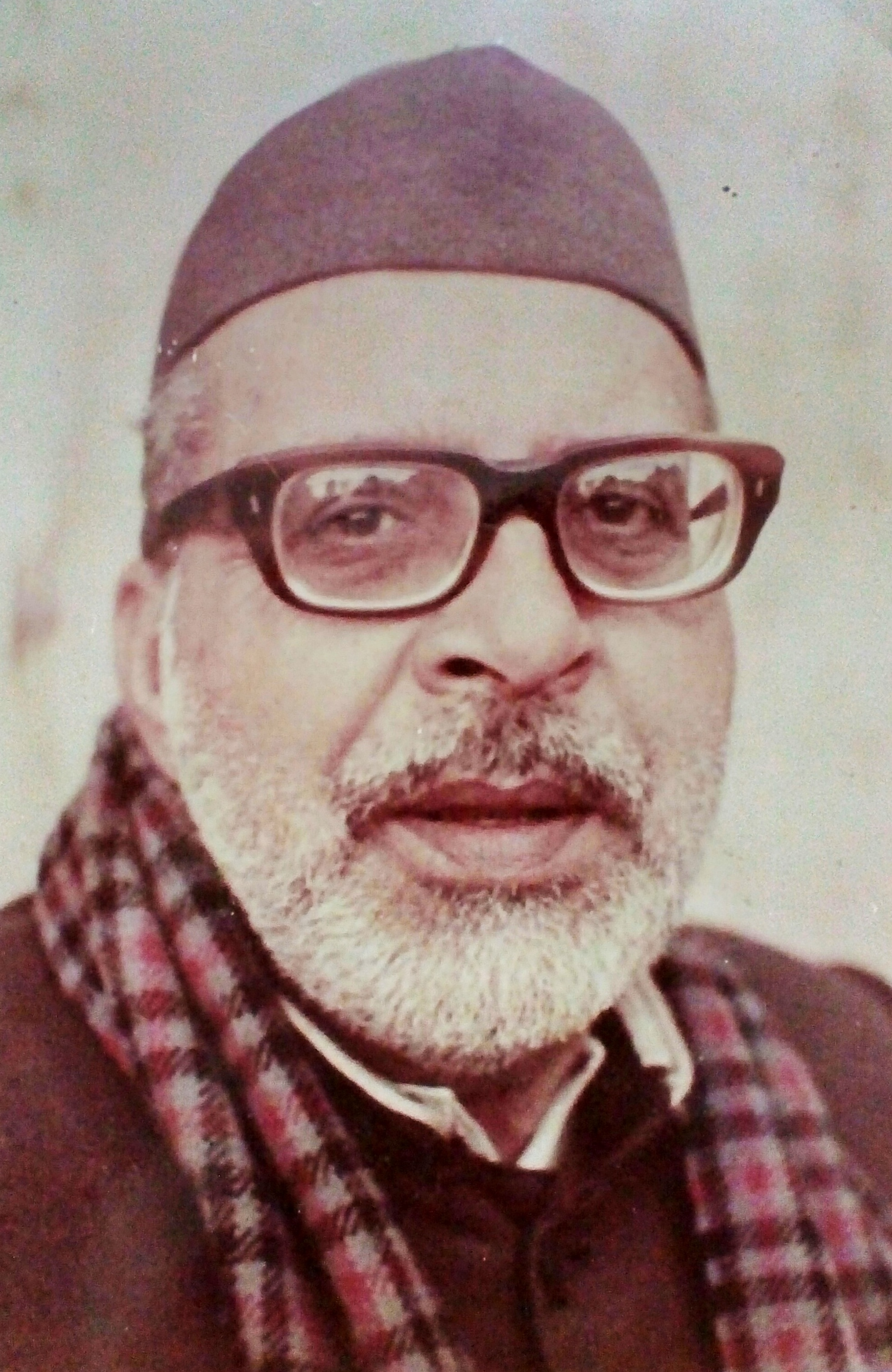
Syed Shabihul Hasan Nonaharvi

== Personal life ==
He was a pious and sincere scholar, and was a simple person in his personal life and used to walk to madrasa every day. During the last few years of his life he became ill and cut down on traveling. He died at the age of 81 years on 25 March 1980, in Lucknow and was buried in Imambara Ghufran Ma'ab.

=== Syed Shabihul Hasan Nonaharvi ===
His eldest son, Shia cleric Syed Shabihul Hasan Nonaharvi, died on May 13, 1998, was professor and chairman of 'Urdu Department' at Lucknow University, and ex-principal of Madrasatul Waizeen. He was the last recipient of the combined club prize of AMU Student's Union medal in 1945. Like his father was a cleric, scholar and orator and an expert on Arabic, Persian and Urdu.

Syed Shabihul Hasan has authored following books,

- Nasikh: tajziya wa taqdeer
- Hazrat Imam Husain ki Jeewan Kalpana Unke Viswas aur Jihad ke Parkash me
- Kerbala ki Ghatna
- Diwan-i-Sadghazal
- Nasikh Tajziyah wa Taqdir
- Ahsanul Majalis

Abbas Raza Nayyar, Associate Professor & Head of Department of Urdu, Lucknow University, published following works related to Syed Shabihul Hasan,

- Book - "Shabihul Hasan Number” edited for “Hamari Tauheed" published by Tauheed Publication Kendra, Lucknow in 1998
- Research Paper - "Prof. Shabihul Hasan Aur Darse Niazami" in 'Al Qalam', quarterly magazine in Karachi, Pakistan in July 1999
