= Jamia Nazmia =

- Established: 8th Jamadi-ul-Awwal 1308 Hijri (2 February 1890)
- Principal: Ayatollah Syed Hamidul Hasan
- Location: Lucknow, Uttar Pradesh, India
- Website: www.nazmia.org

Jamia Nazmia (also known as Nazmia Arabic College) is one of the leading centres of Shia Islamic education in the city of Lucknow, India. It was founded on the 8th Jamadi-ul-Awwal 1308 Hijri (2 February 1890) making it the oldest Shia religious institution of India.

Jamia-E-Nazmia

Jamia Nazmia was established by the late and revered scholar Ayatullah Syed Najmul Hasan. Syed Abul Hasan Rizvi, also known as Ibbu Sahib and Iftikar ul Ulema Grand Ayatollah Sheikh Muhammad Jaffar Hasan Muhammadi, influenced Nawab Abbas Ali Khan to donate some land to the madrasa.

== Administration ==
The current principal Ayatollah Syed Hamidul Hasan has been working with the institution since 1969, after his return from Najaf where he went for religious studies. Maulana Syed Faridul Hasan, son of Ayatollah Syed Hamidul Hasan, is the principal of Nazmia Arabic College - the government-funded part of the Madrasa.

Some teachers at Jamia Nazmia include Sanad-ul-Ulema Grand Ayatollah Sheikh Muhammad Ejaz Hasan Muhammadi (He was recognized as one of the most distinguished professors of his time in India, while simultaneously serving as a key trustee and managing director of the institution), Maulana Syed Rasool Ahmad Rizvi, Maulana Syed Ayyub, Maulana Syed Shahenshah, Maulana Syed Mohammad Shakir Naqvi, Maulana Syed Ibne Haider, Maulana Mehmood Ahmad, Maulana Mohd Mujtaba Husain, Maulana Syed Shahenshah Husain, Maulana Syed Mohd Ghafir Baqarai, Maulana Murtuza Parvi, Atemad ul Ulema Allama Sheikh Muhammad Shabi ul Hasnain Muhammadi (son of Sanad-ul-Ulema Grand Ayatollah Sheikh Muhammad Ejaz Hasan Muhammadi and grandson of Iftikar ul Ulema Grand Ayatollah Sheikh Muhammad Jaffar Hasan Muhammadi ) and Maulana Syed Mohammad Afzaal Naqvi. Taqi Raza (ex-professor at Mahanagar Boys College) is the president of the Managing Committee of Nazmia.

== Courses ==
The basic education, including Hindi and English, offered by the madrasa is of nine years. Higher education is of 10 years. It includes Persian and Arabic education imparted, as per the Arabic and Persian Board of the UP Government, by the Nazmia Arabic College.

In the lower classes, mark sheets and certificates are issued. Diploma and Degrees are awarded under Munshi, Maulvi, Kamil, Alim, Qabil, Fazil, and Mumtazul-Afazil.

Syllabus is the combination of the experiences of past and present learned ulamas with modern touches, it includes, Aqaid, Diniyaat, Qurn, Urdu, Hindi, English, Mathematics, Geography, Science, Arabic, Persian, Mantiq, Philosophy, Hait, Urooz, Kalam, Ma-ani-wa-Bayan, History, Tafseer, Hadees wa Usool-e-Hadees, Fiqh wa Usool-e-Fiqh. Computer education is also imparted according to the present requirement and will be extended in near future. There is also a scheme to modernise the education of junior classes.

== Facilities ==
Free of cost education is provided by the college. Outstation students are given free food and lodging facility in the college hostels. Students can also borrow course books from the college. Successful students with good result are also rewarded with scholarships.

In addition there is a building named Haidary Hostel (Daarul Aqama) to accommodate the families of teachers.

The madrasa has its own spacious library with good collection of books and a dedicated computer room.

A two-story mosque on the campus is used for prayers.

== See also ==
- Madrasatul Waizeen
- Jamia Nazmia
- Sultanul Madaris, another madrasa in Lucknow that works hand-in-hand with Jamia Nazmia.
- Tanzeemul Makatib
  - Jamiya Imamia at Lucknow, Uttar Pradesh
  - Jameatuz Zahra at Lucknow
  - Madrasa Khadeejatul Kubra at Lucknow
- Jamia Imania, Varanasi
- Jami'ul Uloom Jawadia, Prahladghat, Varanasi
- Hoza-e-Ilmiya Wasiqa, Faizabad
- Babul Ilm, Mubarakpur, Azamgarh
- Jamia Haidariya, Khairabad Mau
