= Dildar Ali Naseerabadi =

Indian Islamic scholar

Ghufran Maab Syed Dildar Ali Nasirabadi
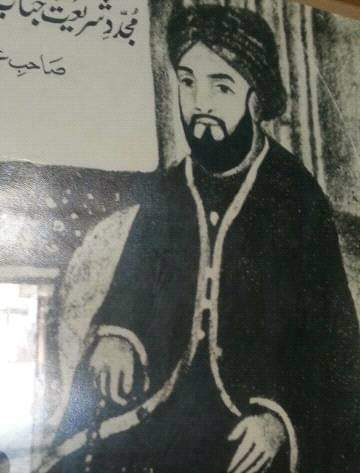
- Born: 1166 AH, 1753 AC; Nasirabad, Raebareli, India
- Died: 19 Rajab 1235 AH, 2 May 1820 AC (aged 66–67); Lucknow
- Resting place: Lucknow
- Known for: Supreme Religious Authority of india

Sayyid Dildar 'Ali, also known as Ghufran-Ma'ab Naseerabadi, (1753 – 10 January 1820) was a Shia scholar of India, from the village of Nasirabad, Raibareli in Uttar Pradesh, India. His best-known work is "Imad-ul-Islâm", in Arabic, a refutation of the anti-Shia arguments used by the famous Fakhr al-Din al-Razi.

== Names ==
The title "Ghufran Ma'ab Nasirabadi" was bestowed on him by scholars in Najaf, Iraq and means "the one who lives in heaven" due to his scholarly attributes. He was popularly known as Ghufran Ma'ab

== Life ==
Seyyid Dildar Ali Nasirabadi was born in 1166 AH (1753 AD), the son of Seyyid Muhammad Muin bin Seyyid Abdul Hadi. His family left Nishapur (Iran) because of the Mongol invasion and settled in India.

Seyyid Dildar Ali Nasirabadi died in the night of 19th Rajab 1235 (2 May 1820), and was buried in Lucknow.

== Education and Marjiat ==
Seyyid Dildar Ali Nasirabadi completed his early studies in India, before travelling to Iraq in 1193 AH (1776 AD) for further education. Among his tutors in Iraq were Shaikh Ja'far Kashiful Ghita, and Wahid Behbehani. Later, he moved to Mashhad (Iran) for additional studies.

First, he arrived in Karabal-e-Maulla Iraq, where he studied under Aqaay Syed Ali Tabatabai and Aaqa Syed Mehdi Moosvi Sherastani and the highest scholar and teacher of these two saint Ayatullah Akbar Aqa Baqir Behbani. From there, he went to Najaf-e-Ashraf where he studied Asool-e-fiqh and Ilm-e-Hadeed from Behrul-aloom Ayatullah Syed Mehdi Tabatabai. He completed his highest education and left Iraq in the year 1194 (AH). When he arrived in Mashad, Iran grasped a lot of uloom from Ayatullah Syed Muhammad Mehdi s/o Ayatullah Syed Hidayatullah Isphahani. He was granted the status of Ayatullah. From there he finally travelled back to India and arrived in Lucknow. The ruler of Lucknow Mirza Hassan Raza requested him to stay in Lucknow and he started to deliver lectures in Lucknow and initiated several projects.

Ayatullah ul Uzma Allama Syed Ali Naqi Naqvi (Naqqan Saheb) in his magazine on Gufraan Maab has mentioned that:

Gufraan Maab (A,R) travelled to several cities throughout Hindustan and arrived in Sandela and become a pupil of Shareh Muslim Mulla Hamad Ullah's son Mulla Haider Ali, In Allahbad Under Syed Ghulam Ali Dakni, and in Bareli from Moulvi Baab Ullah he learned Sarf-o-nahv, maani aur Bayan, logic, philosophy and mathematics. After several years he travelled to Faizabad where he went to see Behrul uloom Moulvi Abdul Ali Sahalvi, where he had great debates on different logical problems. From there he travelled to Lucknow. At this time the ruler of Awadh (Lucknow) was Nawab Asif-ud-Daula and Nawab Sarfraz Ud-Daula Mirza Ahsan Raza Khan. They realized that so far there was no prominent Shia scholar in Inidia who could be called Mujtehid. Due to their respect for Gufraan Maab and with the help of the Almighty they sent him to Najaf for further studies.

== Theology ==
While in India he followed the Akhbari persuasion, but changed to the Usuli school after his studies in Iraq. Upon his return to Lucknow, he became a Marja' in India, his fatwas being regarded as final by the Shia populace.

Sources record that initially Syed Dildar Ali Naqvi was of Akhbari tendency but when he travelled to Najaf, he met scholars of high repute and became an "Usooli" . He then travelled back after spending a very long time in Najaf and preached the same in India. He started writing books refuting Akhbarism which led to an extremely heated debate between Akhbaris and Usoolis. He dismounted Akhbarism from its roots and Usoolism took all of the Indian Sub-continent.

Janab Baqar Shams Saheb Qibla has written in his book "Hindustan main shiaat ki Tareekh" (page:3)

Ayatullah Gufraan Maab was a sensitive child, who most of the time used to remain silent but he was deep sighted and was mentally very strong. He had great eloquence and was worried about the deteriorating situation of the Shia community in India. It is written in the books of History of Lucknow that once he was under a tree and a light illuminated and sounds roared and said "Dildar Ali go and obtain religious education". the sound repeated several times. Finally he decided to go to a religious seminary.

== Works and legacy ==
His magnum opus in Theology (IlmulKalam) is known as "ImadulIslam" which he wrote in Arabic, in refutation of anti-Shia arguments by Fakhru al-Din Razi. His detailed work in FIQH is 'MUNTAHAL AFKAR'.

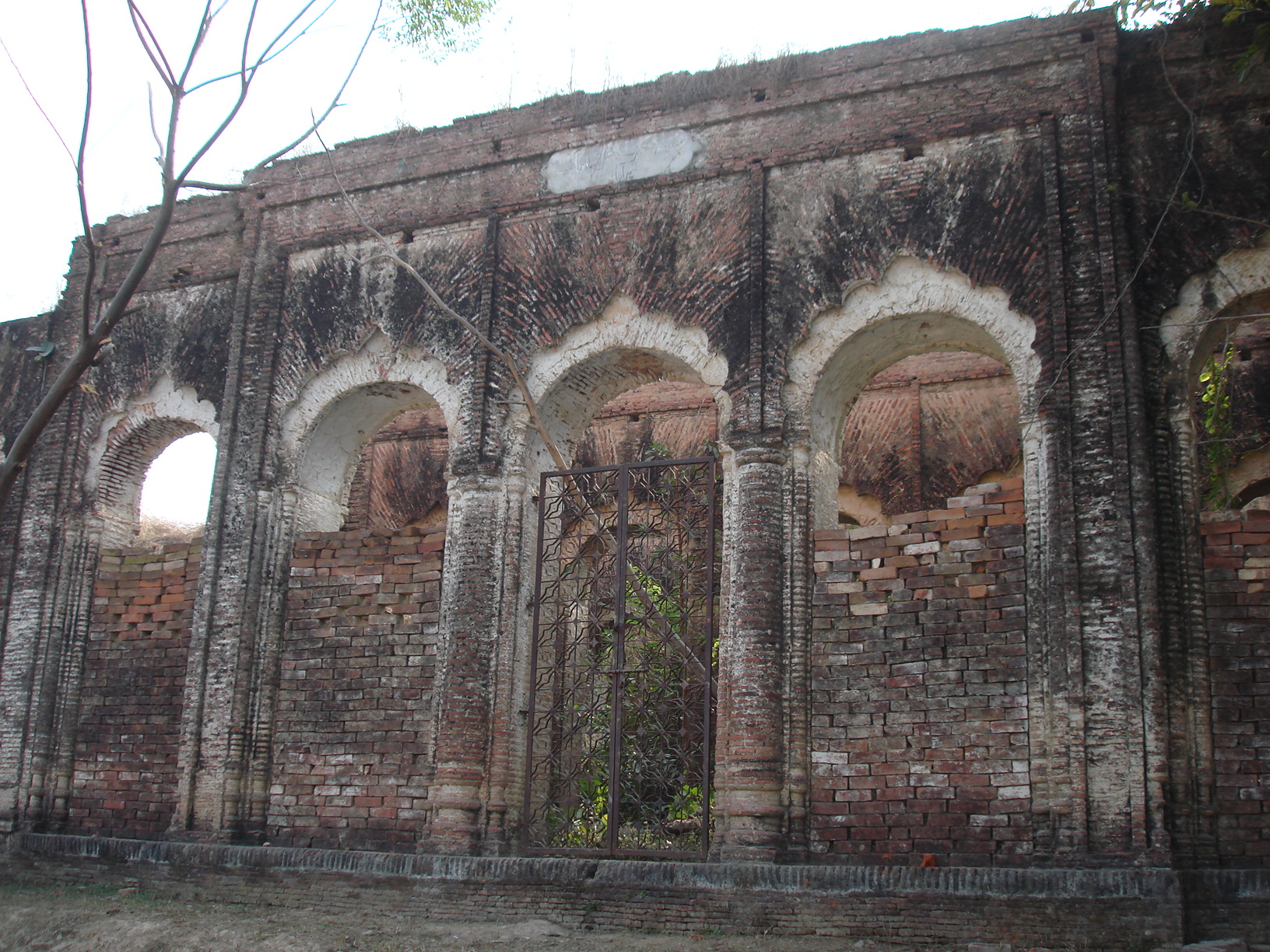
Imambara Ghufranmaab Nasirabad

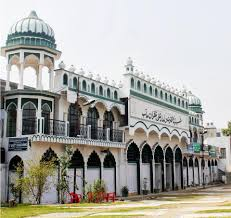
Imambada Ghufranmab Lucknow

There is an Imambada (A holy building) in his name (Imambara Ghufran Ma'ab) in the city of Lucknow and village-Nasirabad, Uttar Pradesh, India.

== Family ==
Dildar Ali Naqvi Nasirabadi had five sons: Syed Mohammad, Syed Ali, Syed Hasan, Syed Mehdi and Syed Hussain. His sons were also pious, dedicated scholars and teachers. Apart from this, he had two daughters Aamina Begum and Taqayya Begum. He married both his daughters to Haji Talib Hussain Nasirabadi and Mawali Hussain Nasirabadi, both sons of Maqsood Ali of his own family. Mawali Hussain and Taqayya Begum had no children, while Haji Talib Hussain and Amina Begum had four sons Karamat husain, Shrafat Husain, Nadir Husian, Mustafa Husain, whose children are still present in Nasirabad, Lucknow, Madhya Pradesh and Pakistan.

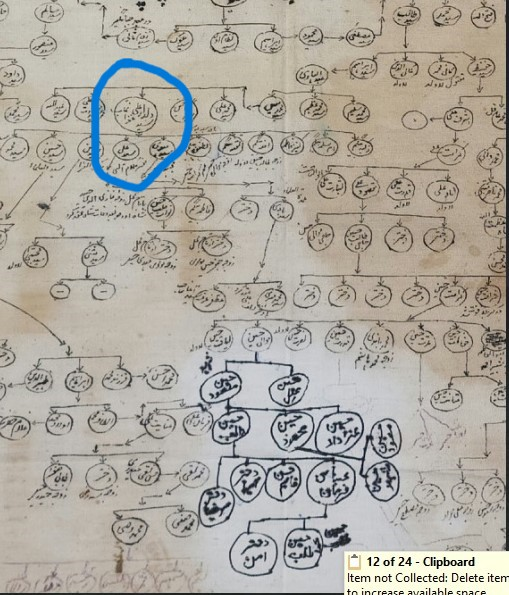
Family Tree of Dildar Ali Nasirabadi

=== Descendants of Ghufran Ma'ab Nasirabadi ===
- Ayatullah ul uzma Sultan-ul-ulema Syed Muhammad Saheb Rizwaan Maab
- Ayatullah ul Uzma Syed ul-Ulema Syed Hussain Saheb Illeen Makan
- Najmul Ulema Ayatullah Syed Ali Naqvi Tabesaraah
- Alam-ul-Ulama Ayatullah Al Uzma (Allama Syed Sibt-e-Hussain Naqvi
- Ayatullah Syed Ahmed Allama Hindi
- Ayatullah ul Uzma Syed Ibrahim Saab Qibla
- Ayatullah ul Uzma Syed Taqi Saheb Jannat Maab
- Syed-ul-Ulama Ayatullah Syed Ali Naqi Naqvi
- Raes-ul-Ullema Ayatullah Maulana Syed Kazim Naqvi (1934–2018)
- Ayatullah Mohsin ul Millat Moulana Syed Muhammad Mohsin ul Naqvi Saheb Qibla Mujtahid
- Allama Syed Naseer Ijtehadi
- Mujtahid Maulana Syed Aqa Hasan
- Maulana Syed Kalbe Hussain
- Ayatullah Syed Ali Anwar Qibla
- Maulana Syed Kalbe Abid
- Maulana Syed Hasan Naqvi (Malaaz-ul-Ulama)
- Maulana Syed Aga Mehdi Saheb Qibla
- Mujtahid Maulana Syed Muhammad Hussain Naqvi Saheb Qibla
- Ayatullah Syed-ul-Ulama Syed Ali Muhammad Naqvi Saheb Qibla Mujtahid
- Maulana Dr. Syed Kalb-e-Sadiq Saheb
- Mulana Hassan Zafar Naqvi Saheb
- Maulana Syed Sibte Hasan Naqvi
- Maulana Dr Syed Mohammad Waris Hasan Naqvi
- Maulana Sayyed Kalb-e-Jawwad Saheb
- Maulana Syed Saif Abbas
- Dy Syed Ali Akbar Naqvi
- Dr Syed Ali Muzaffar Naqvi.
- Syed Hasan Abbas Naqvi.
- Syed Farman Abbas Naqvi.
- Syed Qasim Hasan Naqvi.
- Syed Anwar Sadat Naqvi.
