= Mohammadi, Khuzestan =

Mohammadi محمدي
- Village
- Location within Iran
- Coordinates: 30°45′41″N 48°42′59″E
- Country: Iran
- Province: Khuzestan
- County: Shadegan
- Bakhsh: Central
- Rural District: Hoseyni

Population (2006)
  - Total: 53
- Time zone: UTC+3:30 (IRST)
  - Summer (DST): UTC+4:30 (IRDT)

Mohammadi (Persian: محمدي, also Romanized as Moḩammadī) is a village in Hoseyni Rural District, in the Central District of Shadegan County, Khuzestan Province, Iran. At the 2006 census, its population was 53, in 10 families.
