= Soltaniyeh, Hamadan =

Mohammadi محمدي
- Village
- Location within Iran
- Coordinates: 34°21′01″N 48°37′42″E
- Country: Iran
- Province: Hamadan
- County: Malayer
- Bakhsh: Central
- Rural District: Haram Rud-e Olya

Population (2006)
  - Total: 152
- Time zone: UTC+3:30 (IRST)
  - Summer (DST): UTC+4:30 (IRDT)

Mohammadi (Persian: محمدي, also Romanized as Moḩammadī; also known as Solţānīyeh) is a village in Haram Rud-e Olya Rural District, in the Central District of Malayer County, Hamadan Province, Iran. At the 2006 census, its population was 152, in 34 families. The village is host to a Ta’ziyya prayer-hall, which during Ashura can attract up to 7,000 people.
