= Kalbe Abid =

Syed Kalbe Abid Naqvi (مولانا سيد كلب عابد نقوى) was a mujtahid from Lucknow, India who preached Shia Islam. His father was Syed Kalbe Hussain and grandfather was Syed Hasan Naqvi Aqa Hasan. He was an elder brother of Dr. Kalbe Sadiq, a Padma Bhushan-awarded scholar. His son, Syed Kalbe Jawad is also a scholar and the chief of the Shia population in Lucknow, India. He died in 1986 after being involved in a car crash while on his way to read a majlis. His funeral prayer was also performed at Teele Wali Masjid in the Imamat of Former Shahi Imam of Teele Wali Masjid Maulana Syed Shah Fazlur Rahman Waizi. His final 10 set of Majlises which he read in Imambara Ghufran Ma'ab in 1986 has been entitled "Majlis-e-Azeem".
