= Mohammadi-ye Sofla =

Mohammadi-ye Sofla محمدي سفلي
- Village
- Location within Iran
- Coordinates: 34°12′28″N 46°04′07″E
- Country: Iran
- Province: Kermanshah
- County: Gilan-e Gharb
- Bakhsh: Govar
- Rural District: Heydariyeh

Population (2006)
  - Total: 389
- Time zone: UTC+3:30 (IRST)
  - Summer (DST): UTC+4:30 (IRDT)

Mohammadi-ye Sofla (Persian: محمدي سفلي, also Romanized as Moḩammadī-ye Soflá) is a village in Heydariyeh Rural District, Govar District, Gilan-e Gharb County, Kermanshah Province, Iran. At the 2006 census, its population was 389, in 91 families.
