= Mohammadi =

Mohammadi may refer to:

== Places ==
- Mohammadi, Uttar Pradesh, India
- Mohammadi, Bushehr, Iran
- Mohammadi, Hamadan, Iran
- Mohammadi, Shahreza, Isfahan province, Iran
- Mohammadi, Tiran and Karvan, Isfahan province, Iran
- Mohammadi, Kerman, Iran
- Mohammadi, Khuzestan, Iran
- Mohammadi, Sistan and Baluchestan, Iran
- Mohammadi-ye Olya, Kermanshah province, Iran
- Mohammadi-ye Sofla, Kermanshah province, Iran
- Muhammadi, Markazi, Iran
- Shah Muhammadi, Pakistan
- Shah Mohammadi, Iran

== Other uses ==
- Mohammadi (surname)
- The Mohammadi, a defunct Bengali-language art journal
