= Shi'ite Islam (book) =

Book by Muhammed H. Al-Tabataba'i

- Author: Muhammed H. Al-Tabataba'i
- Language: Persian

Shi'ite Islam is a text on the history and thought of Shi'a Islam.

Written by Muhammed H. Al-Tabataba'i, with the translation, editing, and introduction by Seyyed Hossein Nasr, it was the first text to be written by a high ranking Shi'a scholar and intended for western readership.

== How it began ==
In 1962, Kenneth Morgan, university chaplain and professor of religious studies at Colgate University, initiated a project to produce a text specifically dealing with Shi'a Islam, introducing the Islamic sect to the non Muslim western reader, written from a true Shi'a perspective.

The aim of Professor Morgan to have a description of Shi'ism by one of the respected traditional scholars of the Shi'a, led him and collaborator Seyyed Hossein Nasr, to Allamah Tabataba'i in 1963.

Allameh Tabataba'i was thought of by some as a pillar of intellectual Shi'a thought who combined interest in jurisprudence and Quranic commentary with philosophy, theosophy, and Sufism, and represented a more universal interpretation of the Shi'a point of view.

The project took six years to complete, and was followed by two more extending volumes. William Chittick of SUNY collaborated with the editing, and the book was published by the State University of New York Press in 1975.

It remains a classic textbook for Westerners trying to gain an introductory understanding of Shi'a Islam.
