= Syed Hamidul Hasan =

Indian cleric

Hujjatul Islam Syed Syed Hamid ul Hassan
- حجۃ الاسلام و المسلمین سید حمید الحسن
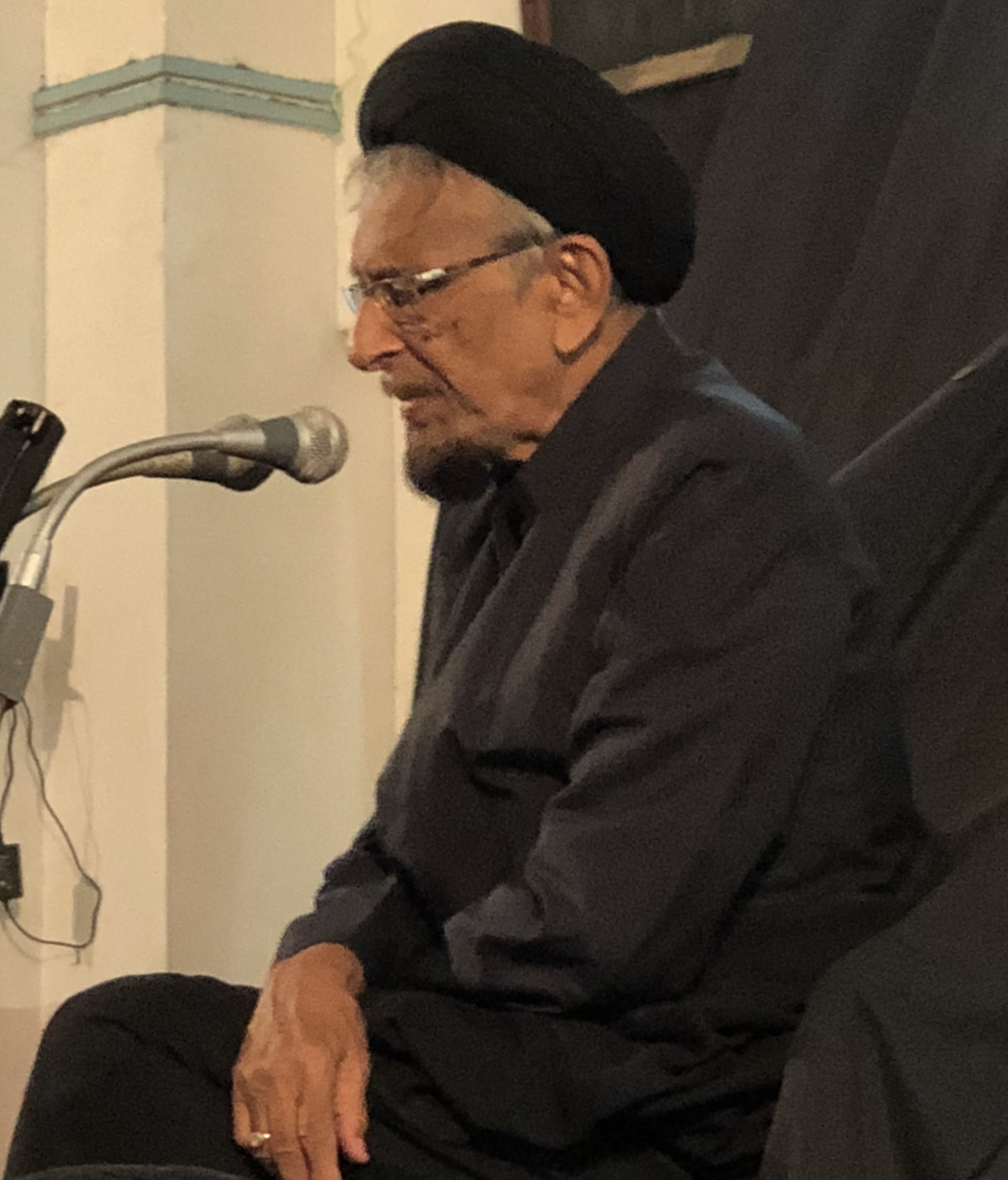
- Hujjat ul Islam Syed Ayatullah Hamid ul Hassan at a Muharram Majlis in Sultanat Manzil, Lucknow.
- Title: Hujjatul Islam

Personal life
- Born: Lucknow, India

Religious life
- Religion: Islam
- Denomination: Twelver
- School: Ja'fari
- Sect: Shia

Muslim leader
- Based in: Lucknow

Syed Hamid ul Hassan is a Shia scholar from Lucknow, India. He is also the current principal of Jamia Nazmia.

== Education ==
He completed his education from Jamia Nazmia up to Mumtaz-ul-Afazil and was taught by Syed Ahmad Ali (son of Mohammad Abbas) along with other learned teachers. After finishing his studies at Madrasatul Waizeen and completing different oriental courses from Lucknow University, Shia Arabic College and Aligarh Muslim University, he went to Najaf-e-Ashraf, Iraq, for higher education. There his teachers included Muhsin al-Hakim and Syed Abul Qasim al-Khoei.

He became the principal of Jamia Nazmia in 1969.

== Social impact ==
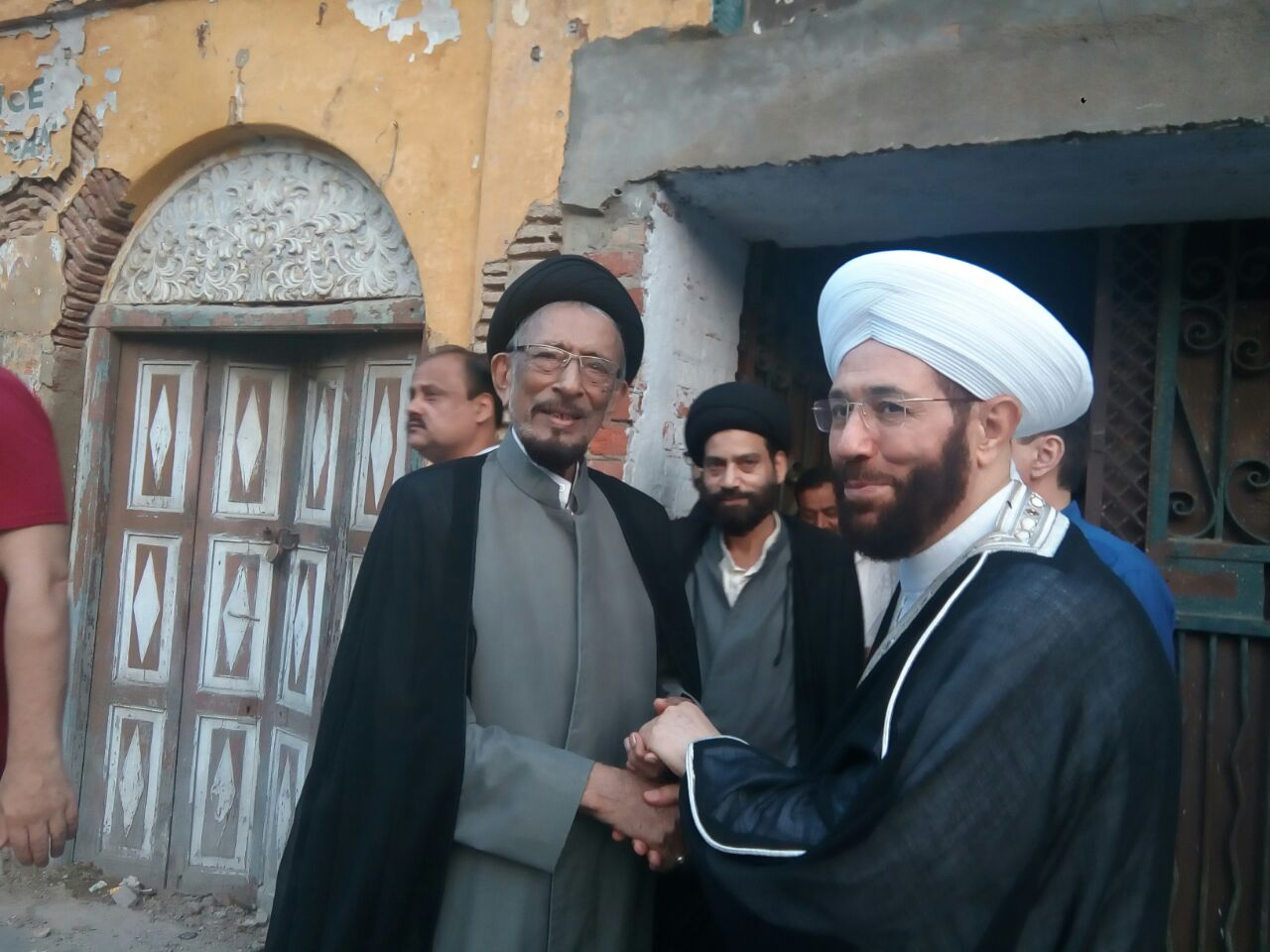
Hamidul Hasan with Grand Mufti of Syria, Ahmad Badreddin Hassoun and Syed Faridul Hasan

He is an authority on Shia theology.

He has always advocated non-violence. He has also strived hard over the years to bridge the gap between the two main communities of India viz., the Hindus and Muslims.

He played a prominent role in resolving the century-old Shia-Sunni conflict in Lucknow in 1998. His efforts in maintaining peace in the city by reaching out to other communities have been acknowledged by the media and administration alike.

== Related videos ==
- Ayatullah Hamidul Hasan's channel on the YouTube
- Ayatullah Hamidul Hasan's moharram lectures
