= Ali Naqi Naqvi =

Indian poet, writer and jurist (1905–1988)

Syed-ul-Ulama Syed Ali Naqi Naqvi Nasirabadi Naqqan
- Preceded by: Maulana Abdul Hasan Naqvi
- Title: Grand Ayatollah

Personal life
- Born: 26 December 1905 Lucknow, United Provinces of Agra and Oudh, British India
- Died: 18 May 1988 (aged 82) Lucknow, Uttar Pradesh, India

Religious life
- Religion: Islam
- Denomination: Usuli Twelver Shi`a Islam

Muslim leader
- Based in: Lucknow, India
- Post: Grand Ayatollah

Grand Ayatollah Syed Ali Naqi Naqvi Nasirabadi (26 December 1905 – 18 May 1988) was an Indian Twelver Shia marja, poet, writer, jurist and interpreter of the Quran. He has authored numerous books on Shia Islam in both Arabic and Urdu, such as Shaheed-e-Insaniyat and Tareekh-e-Islam, as well as a commentary on his translation of the Quran. Contemporary accounts and later scholars have described him as an influential religious writer and teacher.

== Early life and education ==
Naqvi was born on 26 December 1905, in Lucknow, British India. Around 1327 Hijri (1909), when he was three or four years old, his father, Syed Abul Hasan Naqvi (Mumtaz al-Ulama), took him and his family to Iraq. At the age of seven, he had a Bismillah ceremony that was held at the Rauza-e-Imam Ali in Najaf, Iraq. Naqvi's formal education then began in Iraq, where he studied Arabic and Persian grammar, and the basics of the Quran.

In 1914, the family returned to India, and Naqvi's religious education continued under his father's tuition. He later attended the Sultan al-Madaris Seminary and studied Arabic literature with Mufti Muhammad Ali. Naqvi passed the exam for certification as a religious scholar (alim) from Allahabad University in 1923 and soon gained certifications from Nazamiyyah College and Sultan al-Madaris Seminary. In 1925, he was awarded a degree in literature (Fazil-e Adab).

In 1927, Ali Naqvi departed for the seminaries of Iraq to study Islamic jurisprudence and Islamic theology (Kalam). He had already written and published four books. While studying in Iraq Naqvi wrote several works in Arabic, including Rooh Aladab Sharah Alamiyatal Arab, Albait Al Mamoor Fi Emaratal Qubur, Faryaad e Musalmanane Aalam, and Altawae Haj Per Sharaee Nuqtae Nazar Se Bahas. His first book published in Arabic, "Kashf annaqab ann aqaaed Abdul Wahab Najdi," was written in Najaf while he was a student days is the first book written against Wahhabis. His second book in Arabic, "Aqalatalaashir fi eqamatalshaaer", defended the act of "Matam".

Naqvi studied Islamic jurisprudence with Ayatullah Na'ini, Ayatollah Abu Hasan Isfahani and Ayatullah Sayyid Diya' Iraqi; Hadith with Shakyh 'Abbas Qummi and Sayyid Husayn Sadr; and Islamic theology with Sayyid Sharf al-Din, Shaykh Muhammad Husayn Kashif al-Ghita', Shaykh Jawad Balaghi, and Sayyid Muhsin Amin Amli. After completing his seminary education, he received certification (ijaza') for ijtihad and became a mujtahid at the age of 27. He was given ijazah by Ayatollah Naaini.

== Career ==
In 1932 Naqvi returned to India where, in 1933 he was appointed the title professor in the Oriental College Department of Lucknow University. He taught Arabic and Persian there for over two decades.

In 1959, Aligarh Muslim University invited him to be in the Reader in the Theology (Dniyat) Department, which did not yet have a teaching faculty. The department created two parallel streams of Sunni and Shi'i theology, and Ali Naqvi began to oversee the affairs of the Shi'i branch. He was the Dean of Shi'i theology from 1967 to 1969 and retired from the university in 1972.

From 1972 to 1975, Naqvi was given a research professorship through the University Grants Commission (UGC), and he stayed permanently in Aligarh.

== Death ==
Naqvi died of a stroke in 1988 in Lucknow on Eid-ul-Fitr at the age of 83.

== Publications ==
Naqvi's works include:

1. Alami Mushkilat ka hal in Shu'a-i 'Amal (Jul 2009): 30–39 https://archive.org/stream/syed_ali_naqan/syed_ali_naqan_djvu.txt
2. Ashk-i matam Lucknow: Sarfaraz Quaumi Press, 1957.
3. Asiri-yi ahl-i haram Lucknow: Sarfaraz Quaumi Press, 1940.
4. Aurat awr Islam in Shu'a'-i 'Amal (May 2009): 6–13
5. Aza-yi Husayn ki ahamiyat Lucknow: Sarfaraz Quaumi Press,1959.
6. Aza-yi Husayn par tarikhi tabsarah. Lucknow: Sarfaraz Quaumi Press, np.
7. Bani umayyah ki adavat-i-Islam ki mukhtasir tarikh Lucknow: Imamiyah Mission, 1994.
8. Hamaray rusum va quyud Lucknow: Sarfaraz Qaumi Press, 1939. 313
9. Hayat-i qaumi Lucknow: Imamia Mission, 1941
10. Hazrat 'Ali ki shakhsiyat: 'Ilm aur a'taqad ki manzil par Lucknow: Sarfaraz Qaumi Press, 1969.
11. Husayn aur Islam Lucknow: Manshurah Imamiyah Mission, 1931. (Pdf Hindi)
12. Husayn Husayn aik tarruf Lucknow: Sarfaraz Quaumi Press, 1964.
13. Husayn ka atam balaydan Lucknow: Sarfaraz Quqmi Press, 1936.
14. Husayn ka paygham 'alam-i insaniyat kay nam Lucknow: Sarfaraz Quqmi Press, 1959 (Pdf Urdu)
15. Husayn ki yad ka azad Hindustan say mutalbah Lucknow: Sarfaraz Qaumi Press, 1950
16. Husayni iqdam ka pahla qadam Lucknow: Sarfaraz Qaumi Press, 1953.
17. Ibadat aur tariqi ibadat, 2nd ed. Lucknow: Nizami Press, np.
18. Iqalat al-athir fiiqamat al-sha'a'ir al-Husayniyah Najaf: Matba'ah Haydariyyah, 1929.
19. Isbat-i pardah Lahore: Imamia Mission, 1961.
20. Islam ka paygham pas-uftadah aqwam kay nam Lucknow: Imamiah Mission, 1936.
21. Islam ki hakimanah zindagi Lucknow: Imamiyah Mission, 1935.
22. Islami culture kia hay? Lahore: Imamiyah Mission, 1960.
23. Jadid tuhfatul avam Lahore: Iftikhar Book Depot, np.
24. Karbala ka tarikhi vaqi'ah mukhtasar hay ya tulani? Lucknow: Sarfaraz Qaumi Press, 1960.
25. Karbala ki yadgar payas Lucknow: Sarfaraz Qaumi Press, 1959.
26. Khilafat-i Yazid kay muta'alliq azad ara'in Lucknow: Imamiyah Mission, 1953. (Pdf Urdu)
27. Khuda ki ma'rafat Lucknow: Imamiyah Mission, 1938.
28. Khutbaat-e-Karbala (Pdf Hindi / Pdf Urdu
29. Khutbat-i Sayyidul 'ulama' muta'lliq karnama-yi Husayn Lucknow: Idarah-yi Payam-i Islam, np.
30. La tufsidu fi alard. 3rd ed. Lucknow: Imamiyah Mission, 1998.
31. Ma'rakah-yi Karbala Lucknow: Sarfaraz Qaumi Press, 1935.
32. Majmu'ah-yi taqarir. 5 vols. Lahore: Imamiyah Kutubkhana, np.
33. Maqalat-i Sayyidul 'ulama’ Lucknow: Imamiyah Mission, 1996.
34. Maqsad-i Husayn Lucknow: Sarfaraz Qaumi Press, 1956.
35. Mas'alah-yi hayat an-nabi aur vaqi'ah-yi vafat-i rusul Lucknow: Imamiyah Mission, 1973.
36. Masa'il va dala'il Lucknow: Sarfaraz Qaumi Press, 1944.
37. Mawlud-e-Ka'bah Lucknow: Sarfaraz Qaumi Press, np. (Pdf Hindi)
38. Mazhab aur 'aql Lucknow: Sarfaraz Quqmi Press, 1941. 314
39. Mazhab shi'ah aik nazar main Lucknow: Imamiyah Mission, 1970. (Pdf Urdu)
40. Mazlum-i Karbala Lucknow: Imamiyah Mission 1941.
41. Mi‘raj-i insaniyat: sirat-i rasul aur al-i rasul ki roshni main Lucknow: Imamiyah Mission, 1969
42. Mujahidah-yi Karbala Lucknow: Imamiyah Mission, 1933.
43. Muqaddamah-yi tafsir-i Qur'an Lucknow: Idarah 'Ilmiyah and Nizami Press, 1940.
44. Muqaddema Nahjul-balagha
45. Muslim personal law – Na qabil-i tabdil Lucknow: Imamia Mission, 1996.
46. Mut'ah aur Islam Lucknow: Sarfaraz Qawmi Press, 1933.
47. Nigarshat-e-Sayyidul 'ulama’. Lahore: Imamiah Mission, 1997.
48. Nizam-i zindagi, 4 vols. Lucknow: Al-Va'iz Safdar Press, 1940. (Pdf Urdu)
49. Qatil al-'abrah Lucknow: Sarfaraz Quqmi Press, 1960.
50. Qatilan-e-Husayn ka madhhab Lucknow: Sarfaraz Quqmi Press, 1932.
51. Qur'an aur nizam-i hukumat Lucknow: Sarfaraz Quqmi Press, 1972.
52. Qur'an kay bayan al-aqvami irshadat Lucknow: Sarfaraz Quqmi Press, 1976. (Pdf Urdu)
53. Qur'an-i majid kay andaz-i guftagu main ma'yar-i tahzib va ravadari Lucknow: Sarfaraz Quqmi Press, 1976. (Pdf Urdu)
54. Radd-i Wahhabiyya Lucknow: Imamiyah Mission, np. (Pdf English / Pdf Hindi / Pdf Urdu)
55. Rahbar-i kamil: Savanih-i 'Ali Lucknow: Sarfaraz Quqmi Press, 1961.
56. Rahnumayan-i Islam Lucknow: Sarfaraz Quqmi Press, 1962. (Pdf Urdu)
57. Rusul-i Khuda Lucknow: Sarfaraz Quqmi Press, 1961.
58. Safar namah-yi Hajj Lucknow: Nizami Press, 1977. (Pdf Urdu)
59. Sahifah al-'amal Lucknow: np., 1939.
60. Shahid-i insaniyat Lahore: Imamiyah Mission Pakistan Trust, 2006.
61. Shuja'at kay misali karnamay Lucknow: Sarfaraz Quqmi Press, 1954.
62. Ta'ziahdari ki mukhalfat ka asal ra z Lucknow: Sarfaraz Quqmi Press, 1963.
63. Tadhkirah-i huffaz-i shi'a Lucknow: Sarfaraz Quqmi Press, 1935.
64. Tafsir fasl al-khatab. 8 vols Lahore: Misbah al-Qur'an Trust, 1986.
65. Tahrif-i Qur'an ki haqiqat Lucknow: Sarfaraz Quqmi Press, 1932.
66. Taqiyah Lucknow: Sarfaraz Quqmi Press, 1952. (Pdf Hindi)
67. Tarikh-i Islam 4 vols. Lucknow: Sarfaraz Quqmi Press, 1961. 315
68. The compilation of Nahjul-balagha (Pdf Urdu / English
69. Tijarat aur Islam Lucknow: Sarfaraz Quqmi Press, 1933. (Pdf Urdu)
70. Usul aur arkan-i din Lucknow: Imamiyah Mission, 1973 (Pdf Hindi)
71. Usul-i din aur Qur'an Lahore: Imamiyah Mission, 1964.
72. Usvah-yi Husayni Lucknow: Imamiyah Mission, 1986.
73. Va'dah-yi jannat Lucknow: Sarfaraz Qawmi Press, 1979.
74. Vujud-i hujjat Lucknow: Sarfaraz Qawmi Press, 1932. (Pdf Urdu)
75. Yad aur yadigar Lucknow: Sarfaraz Qawmi Press, 1968.
76. Yazid aur jang-i Qustantaniyah Lucknow: Sarfaraz Quqmi Press, 1965.
77. Zikr-i Husayn Lucknow: Imamia Mission, np.
78. Zindah savalat Aligarh University Press, 1971.
79. Zindah-i javid ka matam Lucknow: Sarfaraz Qawmi Press, 1935.

== Controversy ==
Naqvi faced opposition from some members of the Shia Islam community for some contents of his book Shaheed-e-insaniyat. Some sections of the book claim that there was water in the tents of Husayn ibn Ali during the Battle of Karbala. Other parts question if Ali Asghar was truly martyred by Hurmula's arrow.

Shaheed-e-insaniyat was privately published by Idaar-e-Yaadgar-e-Husaini, an organization of 300 members whose purpose was to review, compile, edit, and present a book on Karbala that would be acceptable for a broader audience to read. The book was written in 1942 (1361 AH) by a team of Ulemas from different religions: Ayatollah Sayyed Ali Naqi Naqvi compiled their contributions into a book form.

Initially 500 copies were printed for review by the organization members who were asked to comment on the text. The public release of this draft led to the controversy, with Naqvi being criticized by some members of the community, due to them believing that he was the sole author of the book.

== Family ==
After his father's early death, Naqvi raised his four brothers, all of whom became scholars of Shia Islam.

- Maulana Syed Abdul Hasan Naqvi (1940–2001), Lucknow, India
- Maulana Syed Murtaza Naqvi (1927–1994), Lucknow, India
- Maulana Syed Kazim Naqvi (1934–2018), Chairman, Dean of the Faculty of Theology, Aligarh Muslim University, Aligarh, India
- Maulana Syed Baqir Naqvi (1938 – present), Dubai, UAE

Naqvi's son, Professor Syed Ali Mohammad Naqavi, was the Dean of the Faculty of Theology at Aligarh Muslim University, a position previously held by his uncle. Naqavi currently heads the Dara Shikoh Interfaith Center of Aligarh Muslim University and has published at least 34 books on various topics.
