= Jamia-e-Imania =

Madrasa in Varanasi, Uttar Pradesh, India

Jamia-e-Imania or the Imania Arabic College (Urdu: الجامعة الإيمانية) is a Madrasa in Varanasi, Uttar Pradesh, India. Its full name is Majma-ul-Uloom, Jamia-e-Imania.

Jamia-e-Imania was established as a Shia Religious Seminary for extended Islamic studies and higher religious education on 15 December 1866/1283 (A.H.) in the city of Banaras (Varanasi) India. It was founded by Moulvi Khursheed Ali Khan, on the proposal of Qazi Maulana Syed Bande Ali Khan the last Qaazi-ul-Quzaat (Islamic chief justice) of Banaras. He provided land for this purpose and the construction was completed under his supervision in 1870/1287(A.H.).

Jamia-e-Imania is the first and the oldest academic center of Shia Muslims in the Indian sub-continent. It is an educational, non-profit, charitable institution serving the community continuously for over a century and a half. It has produced a large number of religious scholars, preachers, professors, authors, orators (khatibs), poets (shayars) and religious activists.

There was a period of 30/40 years during which it suffered from many unpleasant situations and saw some setbacks but it was re-established and rejuvenated by Maulana Syed Mohammad Husaini in 1983 and very soon it was back to its previous position with his efforts and presently it is on the way of rapidly progress.

== See also ==
- Tafazzul Husain Kashmiri

== Sources ==
- Haqnuma (A booklet published officially by Jamia-e-Imania on Platinum Jubilee of Mehfil-e-Husaini in 2009).
- Wasiyyatnamah written by the founder Late Moulvi Khursheed Ali Khan.
- Waqnamah written by Muradan Bibi.
- Khursheed-e-Khawar (written by Maulana Syed Saeed Akhtar Rizvi).
- Matla-e-Anwaar (written by Maulana Syed Murtaza Husain Sadrul-Afazil).
- Waqf (endowed properties) records of Shia central Waqf Board of U.P. Government, Lucknow.
- Unpublished Documents of Imania Library and Waqf records of Jamia-e-Imania, Banaras.
- Educational institute's records of Banaras court and VDA.
