= Syed Kalbe Hussain =

Indian cleric and muslim scholar

Syed Kalbe Hussain Naqvi (मौलाना सैय्यद कल्बे हुसैन नक़वी) (مولانا سيد كلب حسين نقوى), also known as "Kabban", was a Twelver Shia muslim cleric, scholar, preacher and a mujtahid from Lucknow, India.

== Career ==
He was a cleric, and was chief of the Shia scholars of South Asia during his time.

== Works ==
- Duniya Ka Sarveshesth Hasti
- Gharze Shahadat
