= Kalbe Sadiq =

Indian Islamic scholar (1939–2020)

- Title: Padma Bhushan, Mufakir-e-Islam, Hakem-e-Ummat

Personal life
- Born: 22 June 1939 Lucknow, United Provinces, British India
- Died: 24 November 2020 (aged 81) Lucknow, Uttar Pradesh, India
- Parent: Kalbe Hussain Sahib (father)
- Education: PhD in Arabic
- Other names: Kalbe Sadiq Sahab Qibla, Hakim-e-Ummat
- Pen name: Kalbe Sadiq Naqvi
- Website: www.tauheed.net

Religious life
- Religion: Islam
- Lineage: Syed
- Profession: Academic and reformer
- Initiation: Tauheedul Muslimeen Trust

Muslim leader
- Present post: Founder Vice President (AIMPLB) General Secretary
- Awards: Padma Bhushan

Kalbe Sadiq (22 June 1939 – 24 November 2020) was an Indian Islamic scholar.

He was born in 1939 in Lucknow and died on 24 November 2020, after a prolonged illness. He was posthumously bestowed with the prestigious national award of Padma Bhushan in 2021.

== Education and professional life ==
Kalbe Sadiq received his early education from the Madrasa of Sultan ul Madaris and Nazmia in Lucknow. He then moved to Aligarh Muslim University, Aligarh, where he obtained a Ph.D. in Arabic Literature with a gold medal in 1971.

Beside Arabic, Kalbe Sadiq had mastery over Urdu, Persian, English and Hindi languages. He traveled overseas to deliver speeches and lectures on Islamic theology.

Kalbe Sadiq became engaged in religious and social issues with the Muslim masses in the mid-1970s. He was moved by the pathetic condition of the community and believed that the root cause of the backwardness of Muslims lay in their distance from education and knowledge. Therefore, he resolved to spread education and knowledge on modern lines and waged a community-wide war against illiteracy and ignorance. This became the aim of his life.

== Philanthropic works ==
He founded the Tauheedul Muslimeen Trust on 18 April 1984 with an aim to give educational assistance and scholarships to needy and poor students. The educational, charitable and constructive projects that were running under his supervision include:

- Tauheedul Muslimeen Trust, Lucknow
- Unity College, Lucknow
- Unity Mission School, Lucknow
- Unity Industrial Training Center, Lucknow
- Unity Public School, Allahabad
- M.U. College, Aligarh
- Unity Computer Centre, Lucknow
- Unity Free Education Programmes in Lucknow, Jaunpur, Jalalpur, Allahabad, Barabanki, Moradabad and Aligarh etc.
- Hiza Charitable Hospital, Lucknow
- T.M.T Medical Centre, Shikarpur, U.P.
- T.M.T’s Widows' Pension Scheme
- T.M.T’s Orphans' Educational Sponsorship Scheme
- Reconstruction and expansion of the Imam Bargah of Ghufran Maab, Lucknow
- Reconstruction and renovation of the tomb of Urdu elegy writer and Marsia Khwan Hazrat Meer Anees, Lucknow

He was also the President of The Era’s Medical College & Hospital Lucknow and the general secretary of All India Shia Conference besides being a member of Anjuman-e-Wazifiya-e-Sadat-o-Momineen.
