= Kamen (disambiguation) =

Kamen is a German town.

Kamen may also refer to:

== People ==
- Kamen Ringu, Indian politician
- Hannah John-Kamen, actress
- Dean Kamen, inventor
- Henry Kamen, historian
- Jack Kamen, illustrator
- Kay Kamen, merchandising executive
- Kuishinbo Kamen, wrestler
- Marina Kamen, musician
- Martin Kamen, chemist
- Michael Kamen, composer
- Milt Kamen, stand-up comic
- Nick Kamen, songwriter and model
- Rebecca Kamen, artist
- Robert Mark Kamen, screenwriter

== Places ==
- Kamen, Glamoč, a village in Bosnia and Herzegovina
- Kamen (Goražde), a village in Bosnia and Herzegovina
- Kamen, Croatia, a settlement near Split, Croatia
- Kámen (Pelhřimov District), a village in the Czech Republic
- Kamen-na-Obi, a Russian town
- Bolshoy Kamen, a Russian town
- Kamen, Alexandrovsky District, Perm Krai, a settlement in Perm Krai, Russia
- Kamen, a volcano in Russia

== Japanese media ==
In Japan, the word kamen means mask.

- Kamen Rider, television series
- Kamen Rider (franchise), television and film metaseries
- Kamen no Ninja Akakage (Masked Ninja Red Shadow), television series
- Moonlight Mask (Gekko Kamen), superhero in television and film
- Tuxedo Kamen, protagonist in the animation series Sailor Moon
- Kekko Kamen, Japanese manga series
- Hentai Kamen (Masked Pervert), manga series

== Other ==
- "Kamen" (song), by Kumi Koda
- Kamen (surname)
- Kamen (volcano), volcano
- NK Kamen Ingrad, football club
- South Slavic word for stone
- Mount Kamen

== See also ==
- Kámen (disambiguation)
- Kamin (disambiguation)
