= Kámen =

Kámen may refer to:

== Places in the Czech Republic ==
- Kámen (Děčín District), a municipality and village in the Ústí nad Labem Region
- Kámen (Havlíčkův Brod District), a municipality and village in the Vysočina Region
- Kámen (Pelhřimov District), a municipality and village in the Vysočina Region
- Kámen, a village and part of Kraslice in the Karlovy Vary Region
- Kámen, a village and part of Křenice (Klatovy District) in the Plzeň Region
- Bílý Kámen, a municipality and village in the Vysočina Region

== Asteroids ==
- 70936 Kámen, an asteroid
