= Kamann =

Kamann is a surname. Notable people with the surname include:

- Karl Kamann (1899–1959), German operatic bass-baritone
- Uwe Kamann (born 1958), German politician

== See also ==
- Kaman (surname)
