= Beegle =

Beegle is a surname. Notable people with the surname include:

- May Beegle (1882–1943), American publicist, concert promoter, and agent
- Raymond Beegle (born 1942), American musician
