= Kamin =

Kamin may refer to:

== Places and general ==
- Kamin, a village in Sumy Oblast, Ukraine, on the Kleven river
- Kamin in Westpreußen, German name of Kamień Krajeński, a town in Poland
- Kamin Rural District, Iran
- Kamin-2, an Iranian missile system
- Operation Kamin, an offensive launched by Taliban insurgents in Afghanistan in May 2007

== People ==
=== Surname ===
- Aaron Kamin (active 1996-2005), American musician
- Abbie Kamin (active from 2020), American politician in Houston, Texas
- Baruch Kamin (1914-1988), Israeli politician
- Ben Kamin (1953-2021), American rabbi, teacher, counselor and author
- Blair Kamin, architecture critic of the Chicago Tribune 1992-2021
- C. Richard Kamin (born 1944), American politician in New Jersey
- Franz Kamin (1941-2010), American author, composer, poet, performance-installation artist, and pianist
- Leon Kamin (1927-2017), American psychologist
- Mohammed Kamin (born 1978), citizen of Afghanistan who was held in the United States Guantanamo Bay detention camps
- Morgan Kamin (born 1994), French footballer
- Nikh Kamin (born 1967), Indian politician from Arunachal Pradesh
- Philip Kamin (born c. 1955), Canadian music photographer
- Shoshana Kamin (born 1930), Soviet-born Israeli mathematician

=== Given name ===
- Brooke Kamin Rapaport (active from 1989), American curator
- Kamin Kamani (active from 2004), Thai writer
- Kamin Mohammadi (born 1969), exiled Iranian writer living in Britain

== Fictional characters ==
- Jean-Luc Picard, called Kamin in The Inner Light

== See also ==
- Kamen (disambiguation)
- Kamin Geran, a village in Iran
- Kamin-Kashyrskyi, a town in Ukraine
- Kamin-Kashyrskyi Raion, a district in Ukraine
