= Křenice =

Křenice may refer to places in the Czech Republic:

- Křenice (Klatovy District), a municipality and village in the Plzeň Region
- Křenice (Prague-East District), a municipality and village in the Central Bohemian Region
