= Manhattan School of Music =

Music conservatory in New York City

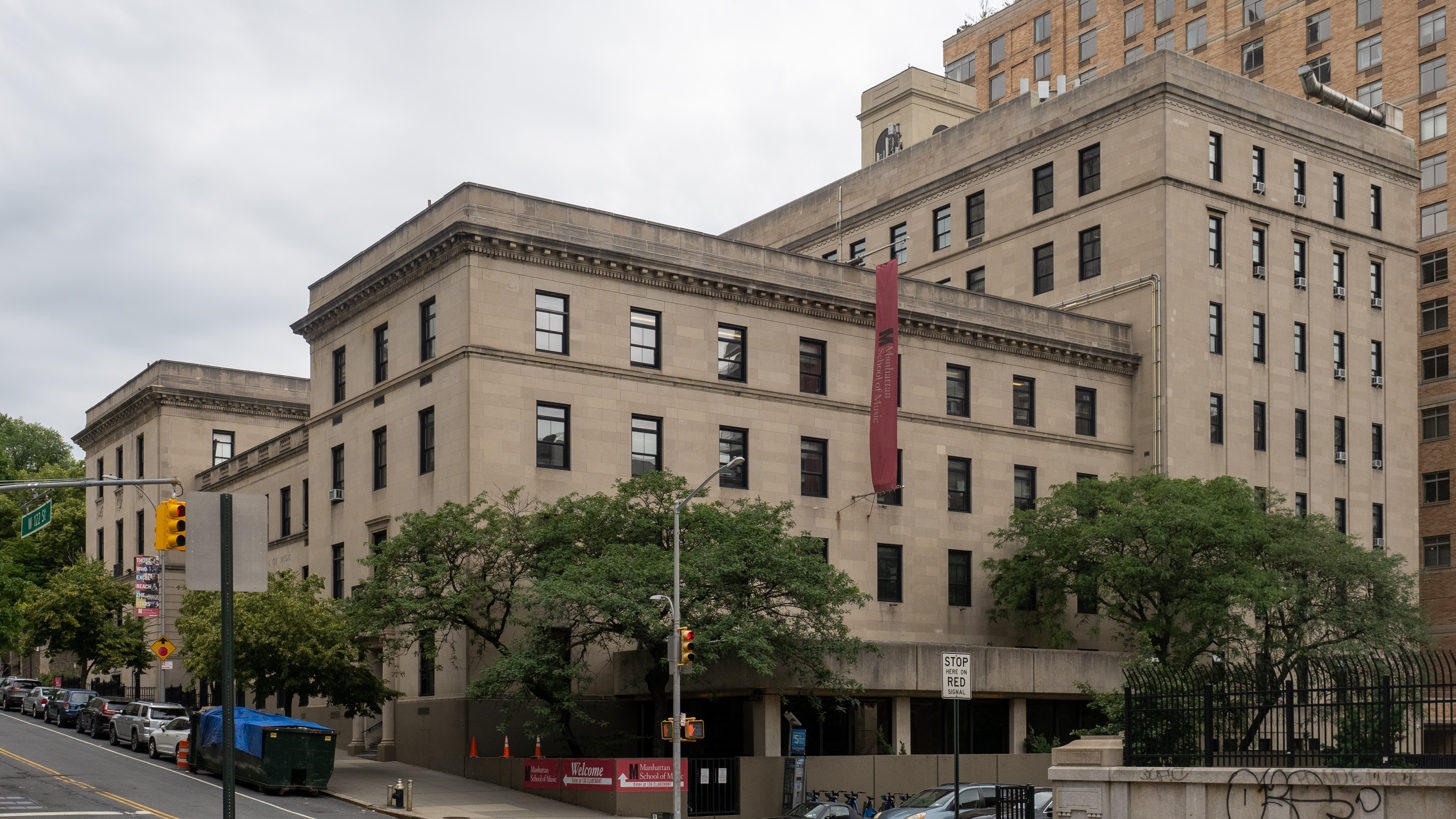
- View of the campus from Broadway
- Motto: Latin: Macte virtute sic itur ad astra
- Motto in English: Those who excel, thus reach the stars
- Type: Private music conservatory
- Established: 1917
- President: James Gandre
- Provost: Joyce Griggs
- Academic staff: 79 FT/ 281 PT (2023)
- Students: 1,097
- Undergraduates: 543
- Postgraduates: 554
- Location: New York City, New York, United States; 40°48′44″N 73°57′41″W
- Campus: 1 acre (0.40 ha); Urban
- Colors: Maroon and black
- Mascot: Manny the polar bear
- Website: msmnyc.edu

The Manhattan School of Music (MSM) is a private music conservatory in New York City. The school offers bachelor's, master's, and doctoral degrees in the areas of classical performance, jazz performance, contemporary performance, composition, and conducting, as well as a bachelor's in musical theatre.

Founded in 1917, the school is located on Claremont Avenue in the Morningside Heights neighborhood of New York City, adjacent to Broadway and West 122nd Street (Seminary Row). The MSM campus was originally the home to The Institute of Musical Art (which later became Juilliard) until Juilliard moved to the Lincoln Center area of Midtown Manhattan. The property was originally owned by the Bloomingdale Insane Asylum until The Institute of Musical Art purchased it in 1910. Many of the students live in the school's residence hall, Andersen Hall. The school is located close to Columbia University.

== History ==
=== 20th century ===
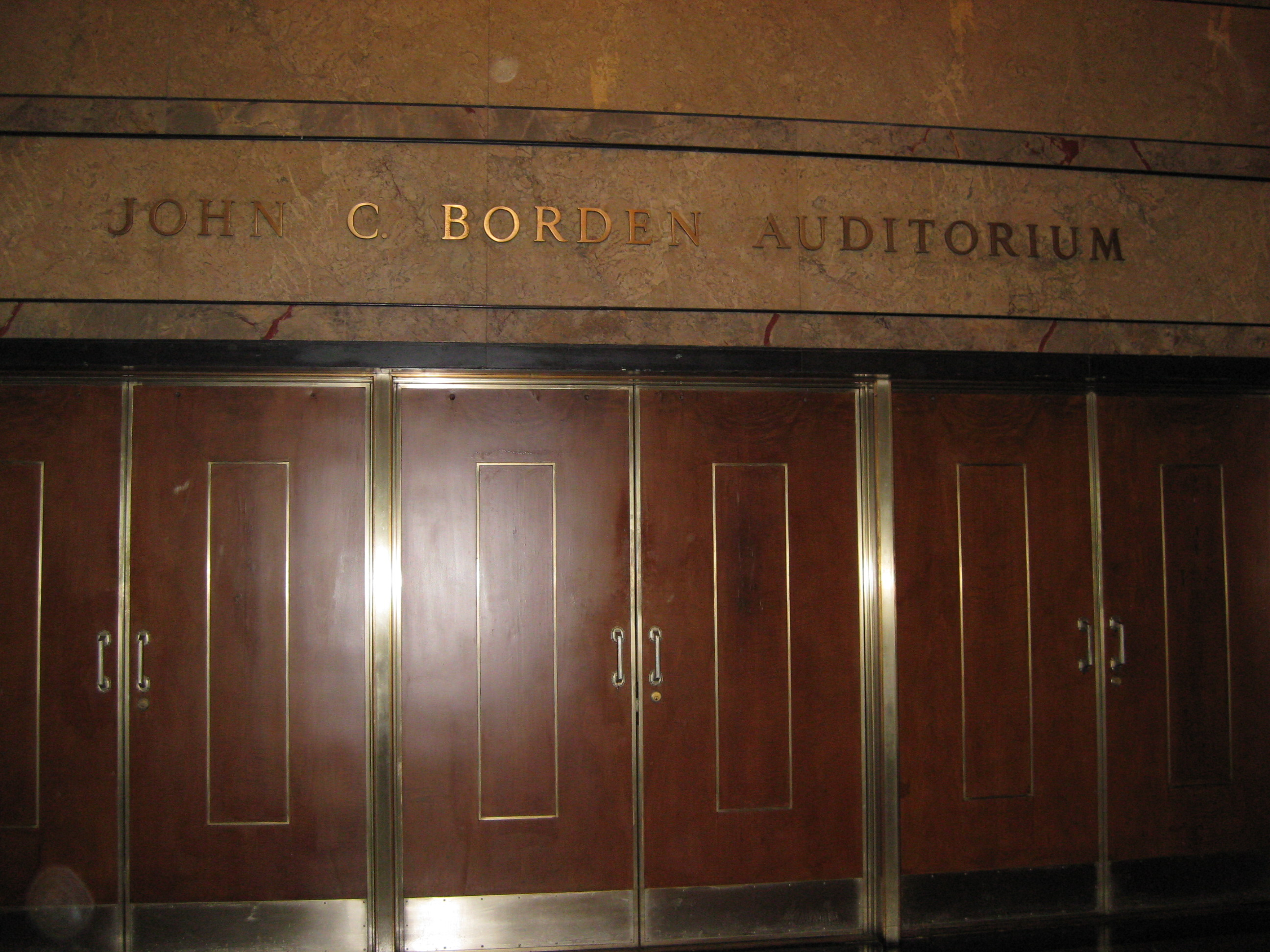
Entrance to the John C. Borden Auditorium

Manhattan School of Music was founded between 1917 and 1918 by the pianist and philanthropist Janet D. Schenck. It was initially known as the "Neighborhood Music School". Initially located at the Union Settlement Association on East 104th Street in Manhattan's East Harlem neighborhood, the school moved into a brownstone building at East 105th Street. Pablo Casals and Harold Bauer were among the first of many distinguished artists who offered guidance to the school. Eventually, its name was changed to Manhattan School of Music.

In 1943, the artistic and academic growth of the school resulted in a charter amendment to grant the bachelor of music degree. Two subsequent amendments authorized the offering in 1947 of the master of music degree and, in 1974, the degree of doctor of musical arts. In 1956, Dr. Schenck retired and Metropolitan Opera baritone John Brownlee was appointed director, a title later revised to president. President Brownlee initiated the idea of relocating the school to the Morningside Heights neighborhood; his death occurred only months before his efforts were realized. In 1969, George Schick, Metropolitan Opera conductor, accompanist, and opera coach, succeeded Brownlee as president and led the school's move to its present location. He created the opera program, while all other major school functions were managed by Senior Director Stanley Bednar.

John O. Crosby, founder and general director of the Santa Fe Opera, was appointed president in 1976. He was followed by Gideon W. Waldrop, who was appointed in 1986, and Peter C. Simon in 1989. On July 1, 1992, Marta Casals Istomin was named president, a position which she held until October 2005 when she retired.

=== 21st century ===
Robert Sirota, former director of the Peabody Institute at Johns Hopkins University, took over the presidency in 2005. He was succeeded by James Gandre, formerly of Roosevelt University, effective May 2013.

After a contentious union certification battle in 2009, the Precollege Faculty established ARTS-MSM, In 2012, nearly three years after the formation of the union, the school and union had not reached a collective bargaining agreement, leading to a leafletting campaign during the conservatory's audition period that was accompanied by Scabby, the large inflatable rat frequently displayed by New York City labor unions to draw attention to allegedly unscrupulous employers. In 2024, the administration and union once again failed to reach a collective bargaining agreement.

== Performance venues ==
Manhattan School contains multiple performance spaces, each dedicated to separate ensemble requirements. The largest is Neidorff-Karpati Hall, previously known as the John C. Borden Auditorium, where all orchestral and large jazz ensemble concerts are held. Major renovation of the hall was completed in November 2018.

== Notable people ==
=== Alumni ===
(Note, due to their length, no additional names may be added to the Alumni and Faculty lists)

- Christine Abraham
- Annette A. Aguilar
- Ambrose Akinmusire
- David Amram
- Franck Amsallem
- Aris Antoniades
- Robert Ashley
- Angelo Badalamenti
- Jared Bernstein
- Judith Bettina
- Angela Bofill
- Luis Bonilla
- Liam Bonner
- Linda Bouchard
- Sara Davis Buechner
- Donald Byrd
- John-Michael Caprio
- Andrea Carroll
- Ron Carter
- Marko Ciciliani
- Paul Cohen
- Harry Connick Jr.
- Anton Coppola
- John Corigliano
- Anthony Roth Costanzo
- Jon Cowherd
- Joshua Coyne
- Kim Crosby
- Jovianney Emmanuel Cruz
- Sebastian Currier
- Marlon Daniel
- Mark Delpriora
- Alondra de la Parra
- Josu de Solaun Soto
- Salvatore Di Vittorio
- Brian Doherty
- Edward Downes
- Steven Feifke
- Ezio Flagello
- Nicolas Flagello
- Kenneth R. Force
- Sullivan Fortner
- Steve Gadd
- Kirill Gerstein
- Elliot Goldenthal
- Susan Graham
- Dave Grusin
- Page Hamilton
- Herbie Hancock
- Edward W. Hardy
- Stefon Harris
- Megan Marie Hart
- Miho Hazama
- Ian Hendrickson-Smith
- Shuler Hensley
- Sara Hershkowitz
- Margaret Hillis
- Larry Hochman
- Daniel Hoffman (violinist)
- Jennifer Holloway
- Rupert Holmes
- Lisa Hopkins
- Paul Horn
- Helen Huang
- Lauren Jelencovich
- Aaron M. Johnson
- Scott Joiner
- Hyung-ki Joo
- Margaret Juntwait
- Marina Kamen
- Aaron Jay Kernis
- Dawn Kotoski
- Dominic Lalli
- Ben Lanzarone
- Yusef Lateef
- John Lewis
- Jose Llana
- Kalman Magyar
- Catherine Malfitano
- Ursula Mamlok
- Herbie Mann
- Kit McClure
- Bob McGrath
- Nellie McKay
- Johanna Meier
- Motswedi Modiba
- Jane Monheit
- Brian Michael Moore
- Rob Moose
- Carmen Moral
- Jason Moran
- Walter Murphy
- Max Neuhaus
- Elmar Oliveira
- Simon O'Neill
- Shahab Paranj
- Marcus Paus
- William Pell
- Leo Pellegrino
- Meghan Picerno
- Tobias Picker
- Kariné Poghosyan
- Chris Potter
- Charlie Puth
- John Bernard Riley
- Max Roach
- Larry Rosen
- Don Sebesky
- Svetlana Shmulyian
- Toyin Spellman-Diaz
- Lynn Strongin
- Richard Tee
- Jonathan Tetelman
- Natalie Toro
- Joseph Trapanese
- Sarah Traubel
- Art Tripp
- Gordon Turk
- Marilyn Tyler
- Dawn Upshaw
- David Van Tieghem
- Dirk Weiler
- Joe Wilder
- Bernie Williams
- Carol Williams
- Richard Williams
- Phil Woods
- Yung Wook Yoo
- Rolande Maxwell Young
- Dolora Zajick
- Miguel Zenón

=== Faculty and administrators ===
- Harold Bauer
- Raymond Beegle
- Gabriela Beňačková
- John Carisi
- Paul Cohen
- Judith Clurman
- Richard Danielpour
- Mignon Dunn
- David Fung
- Andrew Gerle
- Midori Gotō
- Randy Graff
- Horacio Gutiérrez
- Thomas Hampson
- Stefon Harris
- Vincent Herring
- Ingrid Jensen
- Yehuda Hyman
- Olga Kern
- David Krakauer
- Dave Liebman
- Joe Locke
- David Loud
- Spiro Malas
- Catherine Malfitano
- Jim McNeely
- Bob Mintzer
- Jason Moran
- James Morris
- Philippe Muller
- Jonel Perlea
- Neil Rosenshein
- Jaleel Shaw
- Dayna Stephens
- Tazewell Thompson
- Mary Watson Weaver
- Pinchas Zukerman
