= Mohammadi (surname) =

Mohammadi (Arabic: محمدي, Persian: محمدی, meaning related to Muhammad) is a common Afghan, Iranian and Sindhi surname.

Notable people with the surname include:

- Muhammad Haravi, called Muhammadi (f.1560–1590), painter
- Abbas Mohammadi (born 1975), Iranian footballer
- Ahmed Al-Muhammadi (born 1987), Egyptian footballer
- Akbar Mohammadi (footballer) (born 1975), Iranian football player and coach
- Akbar Mohammadi (student) (1972–2006), Iranian student pro-democracy protester who died in prison
- Akram Mohammadi (born 1958), Iranian actress
- Bismillah Khan Mohammadi (born 1961), Afghan army general
- Kamin Mohammadi, exiled Iranian writer living in Britain
- Manouchehr Mohammadi (born 1956), Iranian film producer
- Masoud Ali Mohammadi (1959–2010), Iranian physicist who was assassinated
- Milad Mohammadi (born 1993), Iranian footballer
- Mohammad Nabi Mohammadi (1920–2002), Afghan politician
- Mohammad Mohammadi Gilani (1929–2014), Iranian cleric and politician
- Mohammad Mohammadi-Nik Reyshahri (1946–2022), Iranian cleric and politician
- Morad Mohammadi (born 1980), Iranian wrestler
- Narges Mohammadi (born 1972), Iranian human rights activist
- Saleh Mohammadi (2007–2026), Iranian wrestler who was executed
