= Pittsburgh Symphony Orchestra =

American orchestra based in Pittsburgh

Pittsburgh Symphony Orchestra (PSO)
- Orchestra
- Founded: 1895
- Concert hall: Heinz Hall
- Principal conductor: Manfred Honeck
- Website: www.pittsburghsymphony.org

The Pittsburgh Symphony Orchestra (PSO) is an American orchestra based in Pittsburgh, Pennsylvania. The orchestra is resident at Heinz Hall, located in Pittsburgh's Cultural District. Since 2008, the orchestra's music director is Manfred Honeck. The orchestra's current president and CEO is Melia Tourangeau.

== History ==
=== 1895–1910: Founding and early history ===
The orchestra was founded by the Pittsburgh Arts Society with conductor Frederic Archer in 1895, who brought with him a number of musicians from the Boston Symphony Orchestra and led the PSO in its first concert the following year.

In 1898, Victor Herbert was chosen to lead the orchestra. The orchestra traveled at a more frequent rate under Herbert's tenure, performing in Boston, Chicago, Washington, D.C., and Canada. Its personnel included such musicians as Luigi von Kunits (later the first conductor of the Toronto Symphony Orchestra) as concertmaster, first violinist Frederick William Stahlberg, second violinist John Stepan Zamecnik, assistant principal cello Gaston Borch, Paul Henneberg as first flute, and Leon Medaer as first clarinet.

Herbert composed two orchestral works that the Pittsburgh Orchestra premiered: his Suite romantique op. 31 (which he also dedicated to the orchestra) and the tone poem Hero and Leander op. 33. Under Herbert's direction, the Pittsburgh Orchestra played as part of the Pan-American Exposition at the 1901 World's Fair in Buffalo, New York, for which Herbert had also composed an original work for the exhibition titled "Panamericana: Morceau Characteristique" for the orchestra to perform. His tenure with the Pittsburgh Symphony Orchestra ended in 1904 because of increasingly strident disagreements with the orchestra's manager, George H. Wilson, who disliked Herbert's populist manner and personally despised him.

When Herbert left the orchestra in 1904, the Symphony Society chose as his successor Austrian conductor Emil Paur. Paur took an intellectual approach to his work and avoided theatrics. Trained as a violinist, he had served as conductor of both the Boston Symphony Orchestra and the New York Philharmonic, as well as guest conductor throughout Europe, and held the Pittsburgh Orchestra to the same exacting standards. Paur's programs emphasized the classical repertoire and increased the presence of works by Johannes Brahms, whose music was considered too challenging for most audiences at that time. Additionally, Paur clashed with many of the orchestra's musicians when he prohibited them from accepting outside performing engagements and continued to hire mainly European musicians. Orchestra manager George H. Wilson resigned on December 24, 1906, shortly after the beginning of Paur's third season, saying that his tenure, pride, and pleasure with the orchestra:

"...have all constrained me during the past two years to bear with the personal idiosyncracies, the superficiality of his musical faith, the narrowness of his musical horizon, his indifference to the success of the out-of-town concerts, the hazard (to the orchestra business) of an uncontrolled temper, the frequent distrust of my motives, and the peculiar and ever-shifting focus of the stupidity of the present conductor...these things are characteristic of the man, not passing symptoms."

Paur remained at the head of the orchestra until it disbanded in 1910.

=== 1926–1938: The New Pittsburgh Symphony Orchestra ===
After the symphony disbanded, concert promoter May Beegle founded the Pittsburgh Orchestra Association to bring other musical performers to the city. A new Pittsburgh Symphony Orchestra had its first season in 1926-27.

Antonio Modarelli, an American conductor and composer, became conductor of the Pittsburgh Symphonic Orchestra in 1930. A German newspaper described his conducting as "forceful, authentic, modern music", and he was invited to conduct in Moscow. He had taught at Duquesne University and been a band leader in the Navy prior to his work in Europe and with the symphony.

This program of frequent guest conductors was made in an effort to restore the symphony to its "golden years," but in effect demoted Modarelli, who was finally asked by the board to resign in 1936.

Otto Klemperer was responsible for bringing in much new talent while working with the Musicians' Union to hire both local and imported performers. Since then, the orchestra has experienced ongoing growth and development, including building a substantial endowment fund.

=== 1938–1948: The Reiner years ===
Fritz Reiner was music director of the Pittsburgh Symphony from 1938 to 1948. Reiner studied with Hungarian composer Béla Bartók and programmed many of Bartók's works in Pittsburgh Symphony performances.

Women joined the orchestra for the first time during World War II. Eighteen women joined in 1942, and 24 more women joined in 1944. The PSO had more female performers than any other major American symphony during the war.

Victor De Sabata came to Pittsburgh in 1948, in part because of the urgings of his colleague Vladimir Bakaleinikoff, whom he had conducted in Cincinnati in 1927. Ticket sales increased with de Sabata at the helm. He was so popular with local audiences that around 1,200 people attended a concert he conducted at the Syria Mosque during one of Pittsburgh's worst snowstorms. He returned to conduct the orchestra in 1949, 1950, and 1951. The orchestra established a guest conductor chair in his name in 2010.

=== 1952–1976: The Steinberg years ===
William Steinberg became the orchestra's music director in 1952. During the early part of the 1950s, the symphony played a number of "industry concerts", conducted by Steinberg and sponsored by area industries, specifically the United Steelworkers of America. The sponsorship offset costs for industry workers, and the symphony performed in more convenient locations throughout Pennsylvania, Ohio, and West Virginia. The symphony continued to bring music to smaller communities in partnership with Manufacturers Heat and Light Company and Columbia Gas during the Steinberg era.

The Pittsburgh Symphony Orchestra performed for audiences in Warsaw, Madrid, Berlin, Zagreb, Reykjavik, and 15 other locations throughout Europe and the Middle East during the State Department tour.

Many of the orchestra's earlier recordings were made in the Syria Mosque with labels such as Capitol Records and Columbia Records. The Pittsburgh Symphony performed at the Syria Mosque from 1926 until 1971. The building was torn down in 1992.

Steinberg and the Pittsburgh Symphony made several recordings for the command label starting in 1962. These recordings were made at the Soldiers and Sailors Memorial Hall in Pittsburgh. The technical superiority of the command recordings was aided by the company's use of 35mm film as the recording medium.

Steinberg conducted his final Pittsburgh Symphony Orchestra concerts as music director in 1976, after which he returned for guest-conducting appearances as music director emeritus.

=== 1976–1984: The Previn years ===
André Previn succeeded Steinberg as music director in 1976. Previn had a collegial working style with symphony musicians and even formed a chamber music trio with Herbert Greenberg, associate concertmaster, and principal cellist Anne Martindale Williams around 1979. In 1981, Previn renewed his contract with the symphony orchestra.

During this time, Victoria Bond served as an affiliate conductor of the Pittsburgh Symphony Orchestra from 1978 to 1980. Bond was the first woman to earn a doctoral degree in orchestral conducting from the Juilliard School and is a prolific composer. While at the Pittsburgh Symphony, she also served as the music director of the Pittsburgh Youth Symphony and the New Amsterdam Symphony in New York City.

Previn often brought jazz to the concert hall. In February 1977, the Pittsburgh Symphony Orchestra and Previn made their national debut on PBS with eight specials, Previn and the Pittsburgh. The Alcoa Foundation sponsored the Emmy-nominated program, which ran for three years. Guests on the program included John Williams, Ella Fitzgerald, and Oscar Peterson.

Previn left the Pittsburgh Symphony Orchestra in 1984, credited with "renewing the stature of the orchestra, expanding its position in the community, and giving the city a positive image internationally…"

=== 1984–1996: The Maazel years ===
Lorin Maazel became music consultant to the orchestra in 1984. In 1985, the orchestra elevated Maazel's title to music adviser and principal guest conductor. In 1988, Maazel became music director of the orchestra. Maazel announced in 1995 his intention to stand down music director of the orchestra in 1996, to focus on composition. After Maazel's death in July 2014, the Pittsburgh Symphony performed memorial pieces for Maazel as well as created a multimedia exhibit featuring symphony archival materials related to the late director.

Marvin Hamlisch served as principal pops conductor beginning in 1995 until his death in 2012.

=== 1995–2004: The second century ===
A capital campaign was launched in 1993 to increase the Pittsburgh Symphony's endowment by $70 million. On April 10, 1995, the orchestra announced the appointment of Mariss Jansons to succeed Maazel in 1996 as its eighth music director. Latvian–born Jansons was well received by critics and audiences in Pittsburgh, who applauded the "warmth and humanity" that he brought to the ensemble. With Jansons, the Pittsburgh Symphony toured worldwide and recorded extensively. During this time, the symphony was "innovative in drawing new elements of the Pittsburgh region’s population to concerts in Heinz Hall and elsewhere." Jansons conducted his tenure at the close of the 2003–2004 season.

=== 2005–2007: Interregnum ===
With the 2005–2006 season, the PSO introduced a different model for artistic leadership. During this time, a new collective bargaining agreement was in effect, which gave the musicians increased authority over matters of running the orchestra, such as the hiring of musicians and choice of repertoire. Starting in 2005, Sir Andrew Davis served as the PSO artistic advisor, with Yan Pascal Tortelier as principal guest conductor and Marek Janowski holding the "endowed guest conductor chair."

Sir Andrew Davis, while providing overall programming input regarding the entire season and leading the orchestra in a variety of styles, paid special attention to the music of British and American composers. Under his direction, the symphony performed many symphonic, operatic, and choral works ranging from baroque to contemporary. Davis had previously led the Pittsburgh Symphony several times as a guest conductor between 1977 and 1990.

Davis was originally scheduled to step down after the 2007–2008 season, but in October 2007, Davis and the Pittsburgh Symphony mutually agreed to terminate his contract early and for him not to conduct his scheduled concerts in the 2007–2008 season because of increased demands on Davis' schedule. The contracts of Tortelier and Janowski also expired in 2008. Janowski now holds the Otto Klemperer Guest Conductor Chair with the PSO.

=== 2008–present: Manfred Honeck ===
In May 2006, Manfred Honeck first guest-conducted the PSO. He returned for another guest appearance in November 2006. In January 2007, the PSO announced the appointment of Manfred Honeck as its ninth music director, effective with the 2008–2009 season, in a reversion of conductor leadership format to the traditional music director hierarchy. His initial contract was for three years. In September 2009, the PSO announced the extension of Honeck's contract to the 2015–2016 season. In February 2012, the PSO announced the further extension of Honeck's contract through the 2019–2020 season. In June 2007, the orchestra announced the appointment of American conductor Leonard Slatkin as the orchestra's principal guest conductor for the 2008–2009 season.

In November 2006, the PSO announced a pledge of $29.5 million from the Richard P. Simmons family as the start of a capital challenge for the orchestra to address long-standing financial concerns. In December 2006, the PSO announced the launch of an $80 million capital fund-raising drive after the initial $29.5 million boost from the Simmons family. In March 2009, the PSO announced the discontinuation of its chamber orchestra series after the 2008–2009 season, along with staff reductions of 9 positions.

In September 2009, the Pittsburgh Symphony and Honeck agreed to extend his contract through the 2015–2016 season. In February 2012, the PSO announced the further extension of Honeck's contract through the 2019–2020 season. In September 2018, the PSO announced the further extension of Honeck's contract through the 2021–2022 season. In September 2021, the PSO announced a further extension of Honeck's contract as music director through the 2027–2028 season. In June 2026, the PSO announced the newest extension of Honeck's contract as its music director through the 2032–2033 season.

== Music directors ==
- Victor Herbert (1898–1904)
- Emil Paur (1904–1910)
- Antonio Modarelli (1930–1937)
- Fritz Reiner (1938–1948)
- Vladimir Bakaleinikov (1948–1952)
- William Steinberg (1952–1976)
- André Previn (1976–1984)
- Lorin Maazel (1984–1996)
- Mariss Jansons (1996–2004)
- Manfred Honeck (2008–present)

=== Other conductors in leadership positions ===
- Frederic Archer ('Lead Conductor', 1895–1898)
- Otto Klemperer ('Guest Conductor', 1937)
- Victor de Sabata ('Guest Conductor', 1948–1952)
- Marek Janowski, Andrew Davis, Yan Pascal Tortelier ('Artistic Advisors', 2005–2008)

== Broadcasts ==
=== Previn and the Pittsburgh ===
Launched in 1977, "Previn and the Pittsburgh" was a series of specials produced by WQED-TV. The Alcoa Foundation sponsored the programs, which ran for three years and became the highest rated classical music series on PBS. The program showcased the diversity of Music Director Andre Previn's musical interests, talents and friends. The first program explored Mozart, with Previn and the Pittsburgh Symphony's Patricia Prattis Jennings playing four-handed piano sonatas. Others featured guest artists John Williams, conducting his music from "Star Wars" and "E.T.," Ella Fitzgerald, Yo-Yo Ma, Pittsburgh Symphony principal cello Nathaniel Rosen (the first American cellist to win the gold medal at the Tchaikovsky International Competition), composer Stephen Sondheim and violinist Itzhak Perlman. Composer Miklos Rosza appeared as a guest to hear the Pittsburgh Symphony play his Oscar-winning score for the movie "Ben-Hur." Previn displayed his considerable talent as a jazz pianist in a duet with his friend Oscar Peterson, the man Duke Ellington dubbed "the maharajah of the keyboard." When cameras came into Heinz Hall to film the Pittsburgh Symphony Orchestra rehearsing in their shirtsleeves, audiences saw a relaxed maestro in bellbottoms who obviously liked and respected the musicians. The first show aired on February 27, 1977, and within two days the Pittsburgh Symphony sold more than 2,500 additional seats.

=== Pittsburgh Symphony Radio ===
Launched in 1982, the Pittsburgh Symphony Radio program is hosted by Jim Cunningham of WQED-FM. It is a complete two-hour concert with Music Director Manfred Honeck and guest artists heard on over 100 PRI and NPR stations across the country. The Pittsburgh Symphony was first broadcast in 1936 when NBC Blue Network began a series of 26 half-hour radio broadcasts over the NBC Blue Network of more than 90 stations. The broadcasts were sponsored by Pittsburgh Plate Glass Company.

=== Other television relays ===
The Pittsburgh Symphony under Gilbert Levine was joined by the London Philharmonic Choir, Kraków Philharmonic Choir, Ankara Polyphonic Choir, and members of the Mendelssohn Choir of Pittsburgh in a program that included the world premiere of "Abraham," a sacred motet by John Harbison, and Mahler Symphony No. 2 "Resurrection. The event, which was attended by the Pontiff, Rav Elio Toaff, Imam Abdulawahab Hussein Gomaa, and 7,000 invited guests, was telecast on RAI, on PBS, and throughout the world, and released on DVD by WQED Multimedia, Pittsburgh. Subsequent to this concert, at Levine's impetus, the Pittsburgh Symphony founded a series of concerts entitled "Music for the Spirit." He led the first two of these performances of the Haydn "Creation and Mahler Symphony No. 3 in Pittsburgh in 2006.

== Heinz Hall history ==
A $10-million reconstruction of the theater took place between 1967 and 1971. Although much of the structure and décor remained the same, a new five-story wing was added to the back of the building. This wing expanded the stage and rehearsal space along with the music library and dressing rooms.

Several concerts took place before the remodel and reopening of the hall in 1971, including a performance of works by Berlioz, Beethoven and Brahms by the Leonard Rose, Isaac Stern and Eugene Istomin Trio for the 1969 pension fund concert. Questionnaires filled out by symphony followers were collected after the concert and reflected an overwhelming support of the new venue.

Heinz Hall was dedicated in September 1971. The inaugural concerts took place on September 10 and 11, with William Steinberg conducting Beethoven's "Consecration of the House" overture and Mahler's Symphony No. 2 ("Resurrection") with a combined chorus of Pennsylvania State University choirs. The New York Times published an outstanding review of the performances, citing the improvement of the acoustics over previous symphony venues, saying "Pittsburghers at last have the opportunity to hear (the orchestra) as it ought to sound."

The Garden Plaza and a four-story addition to the hall were completed in 1982 by the firm of MacLachlan, Cornelius & Filoni. The plaza included a waterfall and sculpture by London-based artist Angela Connor. The addition to the hall included two bar/lounge spaces as well as a dining and meeting room. In addition, some public areas were refurbished into reception facilities in 1988.

A $6.5-million renovation began in 1995 with funding provided by the Howard Heinz Endowment and Commonwealth of Pennsylvania Strategy 21 program funds. The renovation improved the acoustical, technical and aesthetic qualities of the hall and was carried out by Architect Albert Filoni, of MacLachlan, Cornelius & Filoni, along with acoustician R. Lawrence Kirkegaard. The hall reopened with a ribbon cutting ceremony by Governor Tom Ridge and Teresa Heinz.
