= Mask Man =

Mask Man or masked men or variant, could refer to:

- The Masked Man (French: Tue-la-mort), a 1920 novel by Gaston Leroux
- Hikari Sentai Maskman, Japanese television series
- Mask Man (TV series), South Korean television series
- The Masked Man (comic book), a comic book from Eclipse Comics
  - Masked Man (comic book character), the titular character from the comic book The Masked Man
- Masked Man (claymation character), a character from the adult claymation TV show Celebrity Deathmatch
- Masked Man (Mother 3), a fictional character from the videogame Mother 3
- Lone Ranger, a pulp, radio, serial, TV, Westerns character, frequently referred to in the catchphrase "Who was that masked man?"
- Martin Ney, German serial killer and paedophile who wore a mask while committing his crimes, leading him to be known as "the Masked Man"

== See also ==
- Masked-man fallacy
- Masquerade (disambiguation)
- Kamen (disambiguation) or mask or maskperson in Japan
- Mask (disambiguation)
- Man (disambiguation)
- Men (disambiguation)
