= Modarelli =

Modarelli is a surname. Notable people with the surname include:

- Alfred Egidio Modarelli (1898–1957), Italian-American judge
- Antonio Modarelli (1894–1954), Italian-American conductor and composer
- Michael Modarelli (born 1966), Italian-American scholar and professor of literature
- Giuliano Modarelli (born 1977), Italian guitarist, composer, and producer
