= Táncház =

Hungarian folk dance event

Táncház (Hungarian pronunciation: [ˈtaːnt͡shaːz], literally "dance house") is a "casual" Hungarian folk dance event (as opposed to stage performances). It is an aspect of the Hungarian roots revival of traditional culture which began in the early 1970s, and remains an active part of the national culture across the country, especially in cities like Budapest. Táncház draws on traditions from across the regions of the Kingdom of Hungary (most notably Transylvania), especially music and dance. The term is derived from a Transylvanian tradition of holding dances at individuals' homes.

The táncház traditions were recreated as authentically as possible, a process aided by fairly detailed research on Hungarian culture. The movement is composed of numerous informal groups. Since the 1970s, non-ethnic Hungarians living in Hungary have had their folk traditions treated the same as their Hungarian neighbors. In addition, ethnic Hungarians outside of Hungary, such as those in Transylvania, Slovakia, and the Siret River valley of Moldavia, are also celebrated by the táncház movement. Sic/Szék in Romania has three streets: Felszeg, Csipkeszeg and Forrószeg, and each street had their own "táncház". Two of the dance houses have been restored or rebuilt: the dance house of Csipkeszeg is now a museum and in the rebuilt dance house of Forrószeg you can admire the dance house pictures of Korniss Péter, a photographer from Budapest. Every month there is a Hungarian dance house in Sic/Szék organized by the Csipkeszeg Foundation.

Within the United States, Hungarian dance groups such as Csűrdöngölő (in New Jersey), Tisza Ensemble (in Washington, D.C.), Kárpátok (in Los Angeles), Életfa (in New York and New Jersey), and Csárdás (in Cleveland) perform on stage bringing the feel of the táncház to general audiences, and camps such as Ti Ti Tábor (in Washington state) and Csipke (in Michigan) bring dance teachers and musicians from Hungary and Transylvania to teach North Americans the music and dance of the Hungarian peoples.

In the United Kingdom, Csergő Band has a regular Hungarian dance house in London.

North America's preeminent Hungarian folk music group specializing in Tanchaz music is the Gyanta Band. The podcast Tanchaz Talk, hosted by Kalman Magyar, is the world's only English-language program focusing primarily on Hungarian folk music.

== Importance of the táncház method ==
In recognition of the revitalization and safeguarding efforts of the táncház method in teaching traditional dancing, it has been inscribed on UNESCO's List of Intangible Heritage of Urgent Safeguarding in November 2011.
