= Kalman Magyar =

North America-based Hungarian folk musician and lawyer

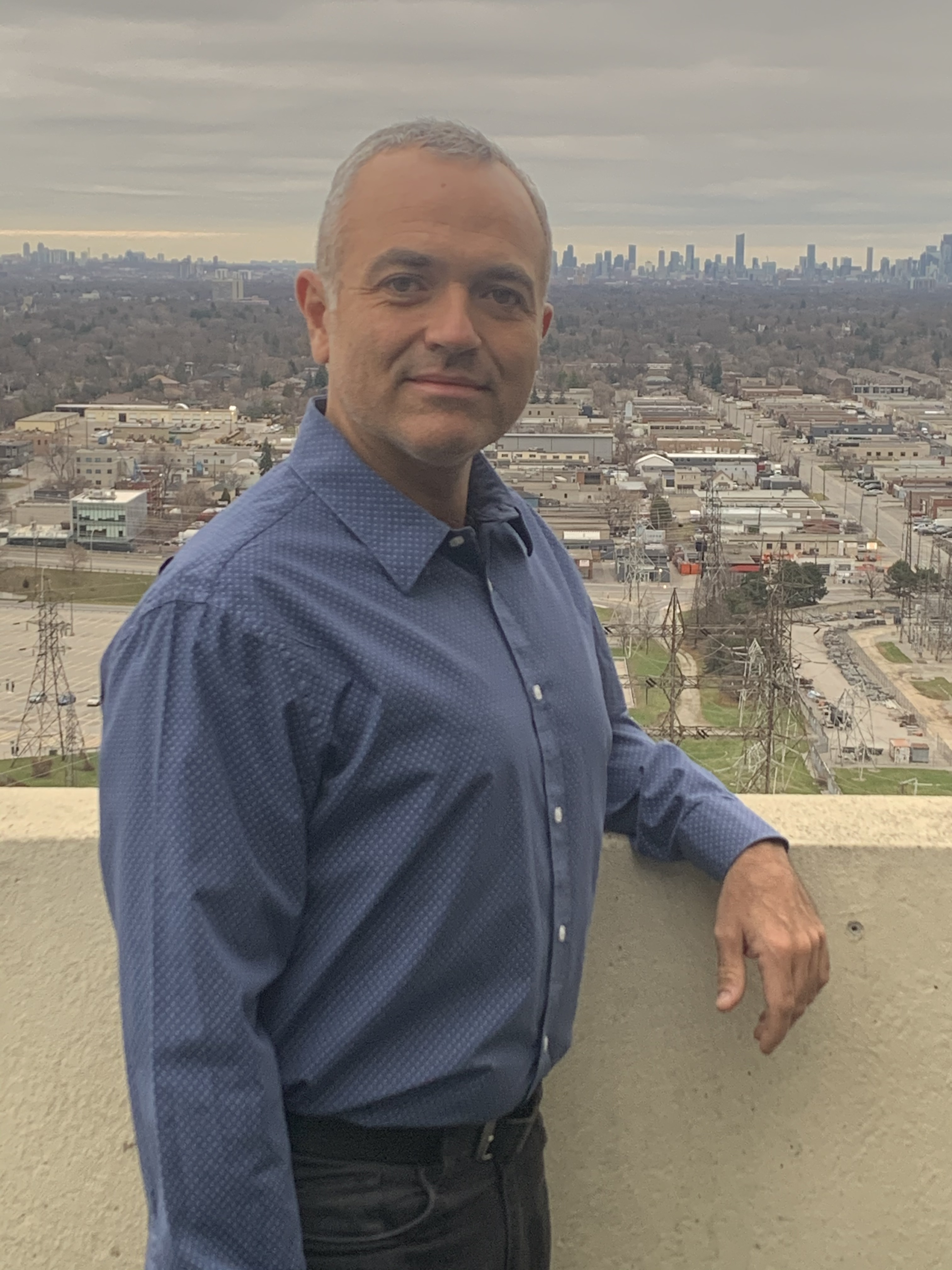
- Kalman Magyar in 2020
- Born: November 26, 1973 (age 52); Boonton, New Jersey, US
- Education: Manhattan School of Music (1991); Duquesne University (1995); Brooklyn Law School (1998)

Kalman Magyar (born 1973) is a North America-based Hungarian folk musician and lawyer, recognized with the Pro Cultura Hungarica Award for his role in promoting Hungarian folk culture in North America.

== Early life ==
Magyar was born November 26, 1973, in Boonton, New Jersey to Hungarian immigrant parents who were involved in the perpetuation of Hungarian folk culture in the United States.

He studied violin and viola at the Manhattan School of Music's Preparatory/Precollege Division, graduating in 1991, and learned Hungarian folk music from village music masters such as Béla Halmos and Sándor "Neti" Fodor.

Magyar attended Duquesne University on a performance scholarship with the Tamburitzans between 1991 and 1995.

== Folk music career and cultural work ==
In 1987, Magyar co-founded the Életfa Hungarian Folk Music Band, the first band in North America specializing in authentic Táncház Hungarian village dance music repertoire.

Since 2007, he has primarily performed with the Canada-based Gyanta Hungarian Folk Band, which has been honored by the Ambassador of Hungary to Canada as representing "an invaluable asset in Canadian cultural life not only as performers, but also as faithful guardians and transmitters of the traditions of the Carpathian Basin."

The venues Magyar has performed at include Lincoln Center, Smithsonian Folklife Festival, Epcot, The Town Hall (New York City), Folklorama, Library of Congress, Symphony Space, National Cowboy Poetry Gathering, and Old Mill Toronto.

Magyar created and hosted Tanchaz Talk, an English-language podcast focusing primarily on Hungarian folk music.

Magyar is a co-founder and Co-Executive Director of the Hungarian Folklife Association, a charitable non-profit organization that connects organizations and individuals dedicated to preserving and promoting Hungarian folk dance and folk music, and provides information to the wider public about Hungarian folklore in the United States, Canada, and worldwide.

=== Reviews ===
According to The New York Times, Magyar has "stood out for his warmth and musical versatility". Attitude (The Dancer's Magazine) called him a "violin virtuoso". Pittsburgh Post-Gazette wrote that he "displayed his mastery of many ethnic instruments rarely heard in concert". The Plain Dealer stated that Magyar "proved to be an excellent showman as well as a versatile player of five different instruments."

U.K.'s fRoots called Magyar a "skilful, experienced player, particularly on violin" and his playing "quite refreshing". Trad Magazine wrote: "Ses qualités de violoniste sont indéniables : grande précision et propreté du jeu" (His qualities as a violinist are undeniable: great precision and cleanness of playing). Dirty Linen stated that Magyar's "one-man-show aspect is secondary to the excellent musical results." Splendid noted that his solo album was "entertaining and musically satisfying".

== Legal career ==
Parallel with his musical and cultural work, Magyar has been a lawyer since 1998, and is licensed to practice law in Florida, Ontario, New York, and New Jersey. He graduated in 1998 from Brooklyn Law School, and previously worked as a judicial clerk, in-house counsel, and in private practice; he is the co-founding Legal Director of Core Legacy Inc.

== Pro Cultura Hungarica Award ==
In 2026, Magyar received the Hungarian government's Pro Cultura Hungarica Award, granted for "lasting merit in promoting and disseminating the values of Hungarian culture abroad, as well as in enriching cultural relations between the Hungarian nation and other nations."

The award was presented by the Consul General of Hungary in Toronto, who noted at the award ceremony that Magyar "inherited from his parents the authentic representation of Hungarian musical values beyond Hungary's borders, he has cultivated it with outstanding dedication since childhood, and continuously supports the folk music education of young people and the professional advancement of artists, devoting his life to the preservation of Hungarian heritage."

== Personal life ==
Magyar was featured in HGTV's Four Houses Canada television program in 2012.

Magyar is married with three children, splits his time between Naples (Florida) and Toronto (Ontario), and published a self-help memoir in 2021 titled Put Your Pants On and Get to Work – Ten Principles for Zestful Living.

== Discography ==
- Tiszta Szívvel (with Csik Band), 1998
- Our Roots (Életfa), 2000
- Szép Szivárvány (with Natalia Zagyva), 2001
- Exposed, 2003
- Crossing Paths (with Alexander Fedoriouk), 2003
- Dallam Dougou, 2003
- Visszhang (Echo) (Compilation), 2003
- Kruno Gypsy Jazz Guitar (with Kruno Spisic), 2006
- Departure (Gyanta), 2011
- Live in London 2005 (Carpathian Invasion), 2025
