= Yehuda Hyman =

American dramatist

Yehuda Hyman is an American playwright, dancer, choreographer, actor, and poet.

== Life and work ==
Yehuda Hyman was born and raised in Los Angeles to immigrant parents from Poland and Russia. Hyman got his start in theater at age 17 in the chorus of a Broadway show. He began making dances in New York City at the Riverside Dance Festival and Washington Square Church. His work has been produced at the McCarter Theatre, Mark Taper Forum, San Diego Repertory Theater, and Highways Performance Space among others. Honors include two NEA Grants, Kennedy Center Fund for New American Plays Award, Jerome Fellowship and grants from the Center for Jewish Culture and Creativity. He performed his solo piece, The Mad 7 at the NYC Fringe the JCC Manhattan and across the U.S. and performed with Target Margin Theater in NYC at HERE Arts Center, Chocolate Factory and the Bushwick Star). He was a 2013/14 Artist Fellow at the LABA House of Study/14St Y where he developed his full-length theatrical memoir, The Mar Vista. He received his M.F.A. in Dance from Sarah Lawrence College (2014). He is the artistic director of Yehuda Hyman/Mystical Feet Company.

== Plays ==
- The Mad 7
- The Mad Dancers
- Center of the Star
- Swan Lake Calhoun
- I Ask You, Ladies and Gentlemen (adapted from the novel by Leon Surmelian)
- David in Shadow and Light
- The Mar Vista

== Literature ==
- Judith Brin Ingber (Ed.): Seeing Israeli and Jewish Dance. 2011.
