= Uwe Kamann =

German politician

Member of the Bundestag
- Incumbent
- Assumed office 2017

Personal details
- Born: 19 August 1958 (age 67) Magdeburg, East Germany (now Germany)
- Party: non-attached (formerly AfD)
- Children: 3

Uwe Kamann (born 19 August 1958) is a German politician born in Magdeburg, Saxony-Anhalt. Uwe Kamann has served as a member of the Bundestag from the state of North Rhine-Westphalia since 2017.

== Life ==
After graduating from secondary school, Kamann completed vocational training as a power plant electronics engineer with the German Federal Railways. From 1989 to 2000 Kamann worked for the IT service company debis Systemhaus. Kamann was on the board of the IT company CSC Ploenzke until 2003 when his contract was not renewed after a strategic reorientation. From May 2004 to the end of 2005, Kamann was managing director of the software company DANET in Weiterstadt. In 2006 Kamann founded the company SEPICON AG. After the 2017 German federal election, Kamann moved into the Bundestag via the North Rhine-Westphalian AfD state list 9. On 17 December 2018 Kamann announced his resignation from the AfD and the AfD parliamentary group in the Bundestag. He justified this with "different views on the political and technical orientations of the party and the parliamentary group”. Kamann opposes military support for Ukraine.
