= Kámen (Havlíčkův Brod District) =

- Municipality
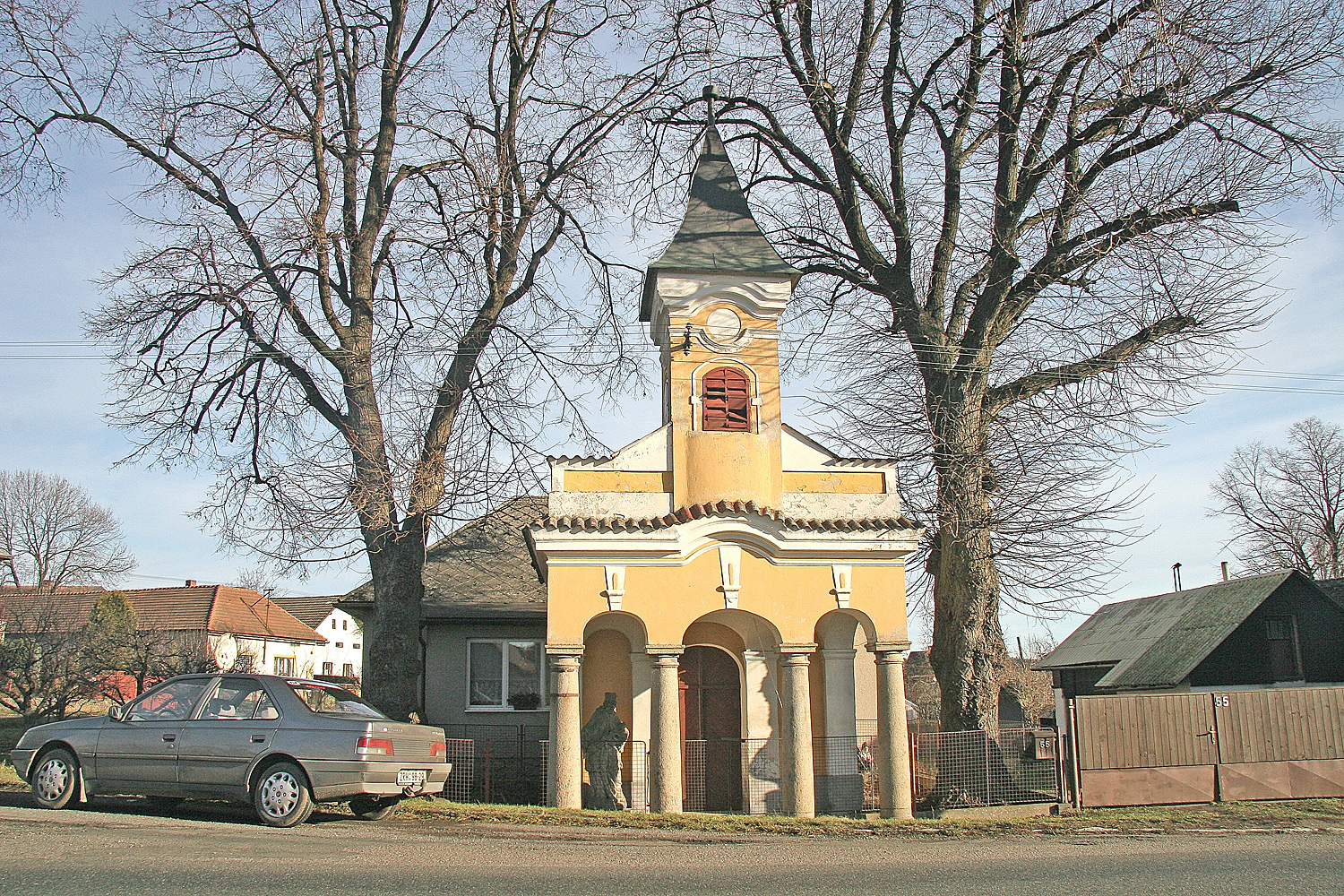
- Chapel of Saint John of Nepomuk

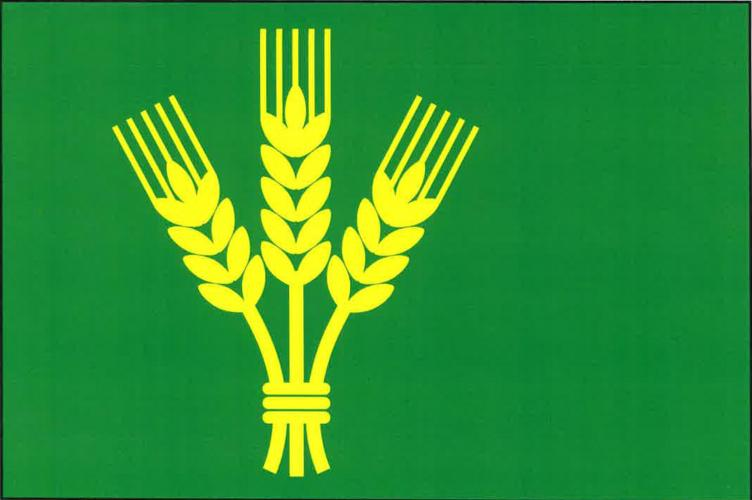
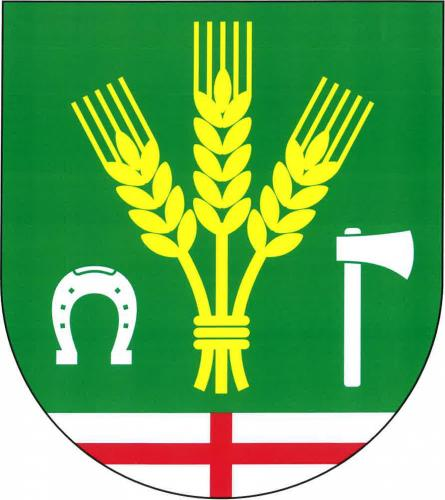
- Flag Coat of arms

- Location in the Czech Republic
- Coordinates: 49°42′46″N 15°31′12″E
- Country: Czech Republic
- Region: Vysočina
- District: Havlíčkův Brod
- First mentioned: 1591

Area
  - Total: 11.54 km^{2} (4.46 sq mi)
- Elevation: 527 m (1,729 ft)

Population (2026-01-01)
  - Total: 457
  - Density: 39.6/km^{2} (103/sq mi)
- Time zone: UTC+1 (CET)
  - Summer (DST): UTC+2 (CEST)
- Postal codes: 582 42, 582 82
- Website: www.obec-kamen.cz

Kámen is a municipality and village in Havlíčkův Brod District in the Vysočina Region of the Czech Republic. It has about 500 inhabitants.

Kámen lies approximately 14 kilometres (9 mi) north of Havlíčkův Brod, 36 km (22 mi) north of Jihlava, and 89 km (55 mi) south-east of Prague.

== Administrative division ==
Kámen consists of three municipal parts (in brackets population according to the 2021 census):

- Kámen (264)
- Jiříkov (70)
- Proseč (46)

== Demographics ==
Historical population
Year	Pop.	±%
1869	670	—
1880	642	−4.2%
1890	609	−5.1%
1900	659	+8.2%
1910	658	−0.2%
1921	664	+0.9%
1930	667	+0.5%
1950	460	−31.0%
1961	441	−4.1%
1970	437	−0.9%
1980	465	+6.4%
1991	426	−8.4%
2001	387	−9.2%
2011	380	−1.8%
2021	380	+0.0%
Source: Censuses
