= Bílý Kámen =

- Municipality
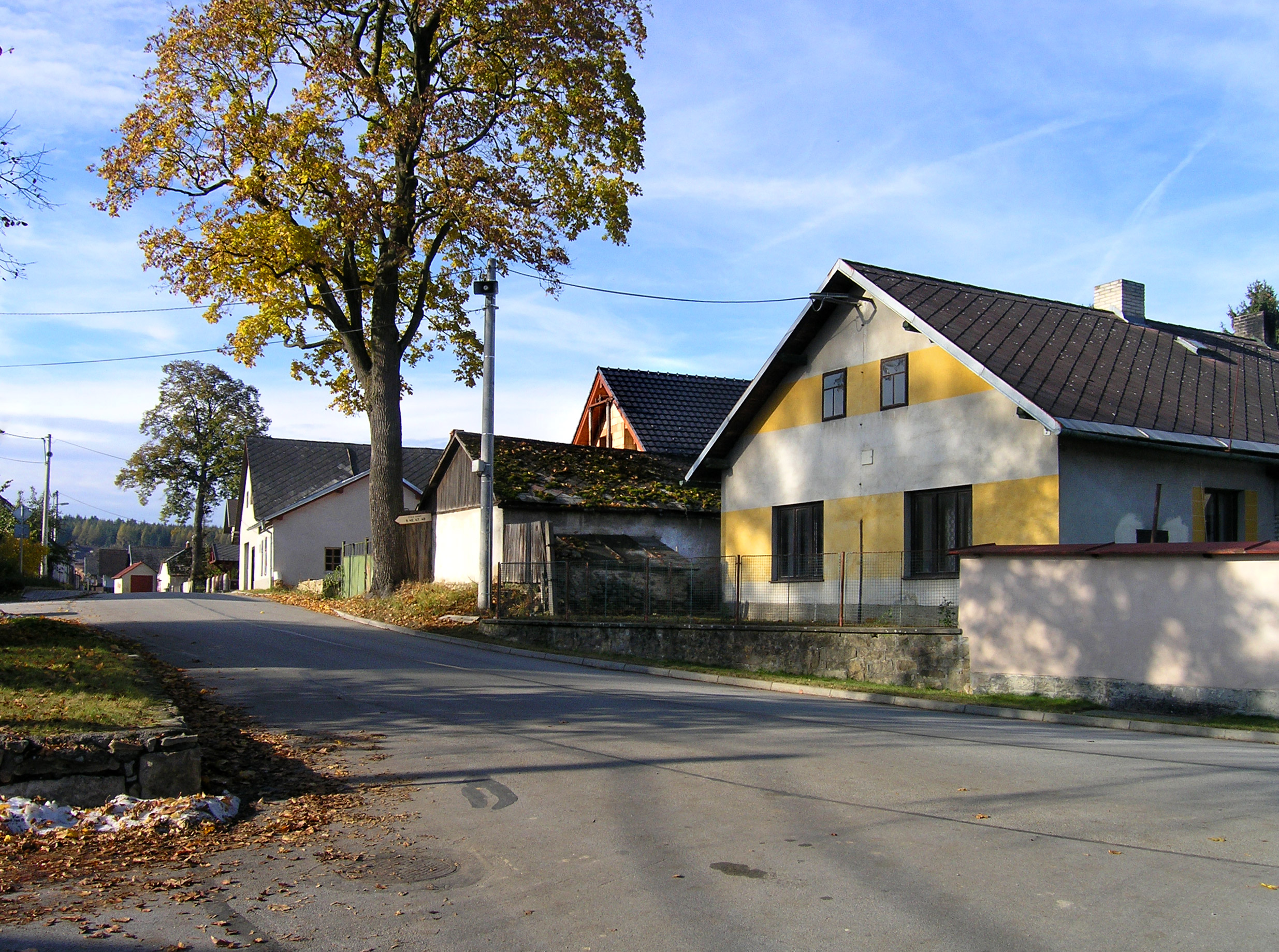
- Eastern part of Bílý Kámen

- Flag Coat of arms

- Location in the Czech Republic
- Coordinates: 49°26′11″N 15°30′32″E
- Country: Czech Republic
- Region: Vysočina
- District: Jihlava
- First mentioned: 1359

Area
  - Total: 5.12 km^{2} (1.98 sq mi)
- Elevation: 553 m (1,814 ft)

Population (2026-01-01)
  - Total: 284
  - Density: 55.5/km^{2} (144/sq mi)
- Time zone: UTC+1 (CET)
  - Summer (DST): UTC+2 (CEST)
- Postal code: 588 41
- Website: www.bily-kamen.cz

Bílý Kámen [ˈbiːliː ˈkaːmɛn] is a municipality and village in Jihlava District in the Vysočina Region of the Czech Republic. It has about 300 inhabitants.

Bílý Kámen lies approximately 9 kilometres (6 mi) north-west of Jihlava and 106 km (66 mi) south-east of Prague.

== Demographics ==
Historical population
Year	Pop.	±%
1869	147	—
1880	174	+18.4%
1890	191	+9.8%
1900	207	+8.4%
1910	197	−4.8%
1921	210	+6.6%
1930	182	−13.3%
1950	106	−41.8%
1961	127	+19.8%
1970	113	−11.0%
1980	110	−2.7%
1991	118	+7.3%
2001	151	+28.0%
2011	249	+64.9%
2021	289	+16.1%
Source: Censuses
