= Křenice (Prague-East District) =

- Municipality
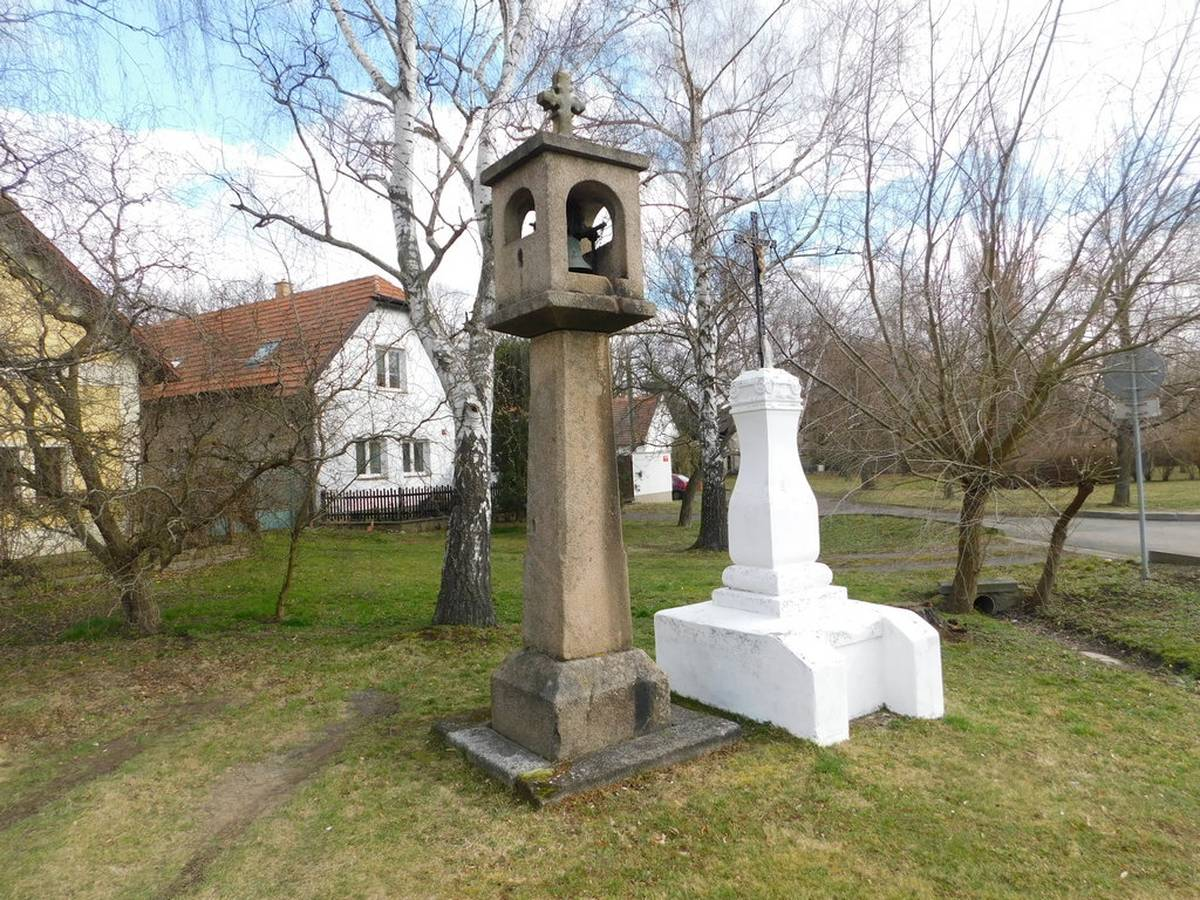
- Centre of Křenice

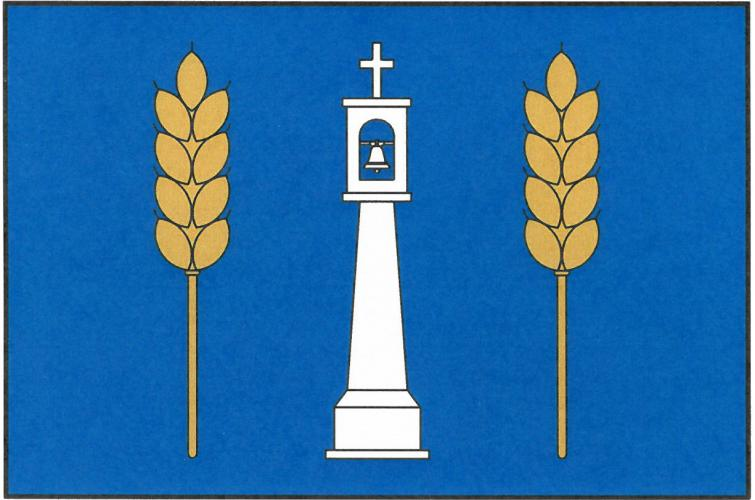
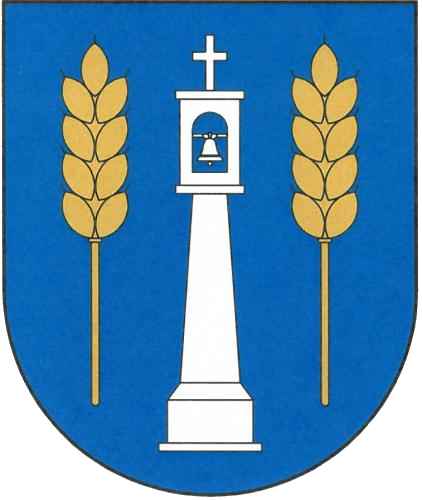
- Flag Coat of arms

- Location in the Czech Republic
- Coordinates: 50°1′52″N 14°40′7″E
- Country: Czech Republic
- Region: Central Bohemian
- District: Prague-East
- First mentioned: 1331

Area
  - Total: 4.02 km^{2} (1.55 sq mi)
- Elevation: 318 m (1,043 ft)

Population (2026-01-01)
  - Total: 1,062
  - Density: 264/km^{2} (684/sq mi)
- Time zone: UTC+1 (CET)
  - Summer (DST): UTC+2 (CEST)
- Postal code: 250 84
- Website: www.obec-krenice.cz

Křenice is a municipality and village in Prague-East District in the Central Bohemian Region of the Czech Republic. It has about 1,100 inhabitants.

== Etymology ==
The name was initially written as Chřenice. The name is derived from the Old Czech word chřen (křen in modern Czech), i.e. 'horseradish'.

== Geography ==
Křenice is located about 11 kilometres (7 mi) east of Prague. It lies in an agricultural landscape in the Prague Plateau. The highest point is at 360 m (1,180 ft) above sea level.

== History ==
The first written mention of Křenice is from 1331.

== Demographics ==
Historical population

Year	Pop.	±%
1869	300	—
1880	357	+19.0%
1890	401	+12.3%
1900	418	+4.2%
1910	464	+11.0%

Year	Pop.	±%
1921	451	−2.8%
1930	382	−15.3%
1950	299	−21.7%
1961	294	−1.7%
1970	299	+1.7%

Year	Pop.	±%
1980	284	−5.0%
1991	277	−2.5%
2001	246	−11.2%
2011	599	+143.5%
2021	1,087	+81.5%

Source: Censuses

== Transport ==
There are no railways or major roads passing through the municipality.

== Sights ==
The only protected cultural monument in the municipality is a set of a stone belfry and a cast iron cross from the 19th century.
