= Raymond Beegle =

American piano accompanist and vocal chamber musician

Raymond Beegle (born 1942) is an American piano accompanist and vocal chamber musician.

== Early life and education ==
Beegle was born in Los Angeles in 1942, and received a bachelor of arts degree from UCLA. He pursued graduate studies at the University of Southern California and the Vienna Academy of Music, and studied piano with Serge Tarnowsky, Aube Tserko, John Crown, and Kyriena Siloti. Winning first prize in the Los Angeles Bureau of Music's "Artists of the Future" vocal competition in 1962 made it possible for him to study the art of piano accompanying with Gwendolyn Koldofsky in Los Angeles, and Erik Werba in Vienna.

== Career ==
In 1961, Beegle began an association with the Gregg Smith Singers, performing in major festivals and concert series throughout the world, and participating in their recording projects for Columbia Records of the complete choral works of Charles Ives, "The Glory of Gabrieli," the complete choral works of Arnold Schoenberg, and the "Stravinsky Conducts Stravinsky." series. As well he played for Smith's recordings of Irving Fine, Heinrich Schütz and Schubert, and appeared as accompanist for the Roger Wagner Chorale in the inaugural week celebration of the Los Angeles Music Center. He also appeared in the opening season of New York's Philharmonic Hall as accompanist for the Norman Luboff Choir.

In 1971 Raymond Beegle founded the New York Vocal Arts Ensemble, which for thirty-five years toured the world and recorded vocal chamber works by master composers of the 18th, 19th and 20th centuries. After winning first place in the Geneva International Music Competition by unanimous decision of the judges, the Ensemble appeared in major halls including Lincoln Center, Kennedy Center, Carnegie Hall, The Library of Congress, Dumbarton Oaks, Harvard, Princeton and Columbia Universities and the capitals of Europe and South America. Members of this ensemble have included John Aler, Jan Opalach, Mary Ann Hart, Paul Rowe, Lise Messier, Gregory Mercer, Wanda Brister, Judith Pannill, Jeffrey Flemming, Charles Robert Stephens, John Kramar and Jonathan Goodman.

Raymond Beegle has served as principal coach in the opera department of the University of Southern California; associate professor at the State University of New York at Stony Brook; and taught classes in vocal chamber music at the American Institute of Musical Studies in Graz where he was accompanist for Jennie Tourel's master classes. At UCLA and the Music Academy of the West he played for the classes of Martial Singher, and the students of Lotte Lehmann.

Television appearances include NBC Christmas special, which he hosted, scripted, and played for the Metropolitan Opera soprano, Theresa Zyllis-Gara, the Today Show, CBS Sunday Morning, and an interview with Charlie Rose.

As an ensemble player, he has performed under conductors including Igor Stravinsky, Robert Kraft, Lawrence Foster, Johannes Somari and Richard Westenburg, and collaborated with Licia Albanese, Zinka Milanov, Jennie Tourel, Marital Singher, James McCracken, Theresa Zyllis-Gara, and other notable singers.

He is currently on the faculty of Manhattan School of Music where for the past fifteen years he has given classes in vocal chamber music and vocal accompanying.

Raymond Beegle was a contributing editor of The Opera Quarterly from 1989 to 2004, and for many years reviewed for Fanfare Magazine, as well as the British journal, The Classic Record Collector. At present he is associate editor of Classical Voice.

Lawson Gould, Inc., Galaxy, and Walton Press publish his translations and edited editions of numerous choral and vocal chamber works.

Raymond Beegle has been a resident of New York City since 1970.

== Notable recordings ==
Work	Label	Instruments
The Complete Choral Works of Charles Ives	Columbia Records	Piano & Organ
The Complete Choral Works of Heinrich Schutz	Vox Records	Organ & Harpsichord
The Complete Choral Works of Irving Fine	CRI	Piano
Vocal Chamber Music of the Russian Imperial Court	Turnabout Records	Piano
Stravinsky Conducts Stravinsky	Columbia Records	Piano
Music of the House	Desto Records	Piano
Mozart Nocturnes & Haydn Vocal Quartets	Arabesque Records	Piano
The Great Sentimental Age of American Music	Vox	Piano
Good Bye My Lady Love	Turnabout	Piano
Songs of Stephen Foster	Turnabout	Piano
Love's Old Sweet Songs	Turnabout	Piano
Listen to the Mocking Bird	Arabesque	Piano
Strauss: Waltzes for Singing	Arabesque	Piano
Beethoven: Folk Song Arrangements	Arabesque	Piano
Schubert: Vocal Quartets	Arabesque	Piano
Schubert: Mirjams Siegesgesang	Grenadilla	Piano
Brahms: Vocal Quartets	Arabesque	Piano
