= Marina Kamen =

Marina Kamen (a.k.a. Marina), is an American musician. She was nominated for a Grammy Award and recorded audio workouts, including 60 albums, 450 original songs, and 1,200 online musical audio programs. Marina released an eBook titled I'm Steppin' Out: Confessions of a Food-a-Holic. Kamen won the 2005 People's Choice Award in Podcasting.

Kamen's career started in 1964, when she performed as a five year old dancer on television shows including the Jackie Gleason Show. Marina received her Theatrical Union Equity Card in 1978 by being cast as one of the cast members in Grease The Musical.

== Career ==
Kamen wrote, recorded, directed, choreographed, and collaborated with artists including Patti LaBelle, Carnie Wilson, James Earl Jones, Mandy Patinkin, Gloria Gaynor, Britney Spears, Liza Minnelli, Rod Morgenstein, B.B. King, Robert Duval, Paul Sorvino, Joshua Bell, and Paul Schaffer. In 1987, Kamen and Roy Kamen, opened Kamen Entertainment Group, Inc. Kamen's 140 Entertainment Industry Awards and 60,000 television, live and film projects and credits in radio and television advertising, included campaigns working for Starburst, Pop-Tarts, Mercedes-Benz, ExxonMobil, Coca-Cola, Dairy Queen, and Febreze. In 2015, Marina directed, produced, cast and choreographed Spears 'Twister Dance Rave' global television campaign for Hasbro. Kamen also cast, directed, choreographed, and produced television spots for Jenga, Tetris and Bop It.

Marina Kamen has also worked with hundreds of children developing their talents in the areas of music, voice, acting, singing, piano, dance, violin & recording production.

Kamen performed a series of concerts around the globe. In the late 1990s, she had three children and weighed over 215 pounds. After losing 100 pounds, Kamen continued to write and produce music while owning and operating an 11,000 sq ft recording production facility in Times Square. Her shows won awards and Grammy Nominations, and secured her spot as the Senior Producer and Host at Webster Hall in New York City. Kamen taught aerobics classes in the 1970s and 1980s, and began using dance music. She released her debut Grammy nominated album, Um-Lotty-Da in 1997. Kamen earned a reputation in the New York City club scene. Her albums and performances garnered the attention of the Dance Organization of America. This committee steered Kamen towards positions as a director and choreographer for Atlantic Records, Columbia Records, Sony Records and The Naras Foundation which hosts The Grammy Awards.

Kamen appeared on British TV on Reborn in the USA, produced and televised from New York City by the producers of American Idol. Kamen has been covered in the New York Times, New York Daily News and Family Circle. She can be seen on Discovery Health Network, PBS and Nickelodeon (The N), ShopNBC, The Tyra Banks Show and ABC News.

Kamen attended The Manhattan School of Music, majoring in Voice, Violin, Composition/Conducting, and Orchestration.
