= Kamen (surname) =

Kamen is a surname of Bulgarian origin meaning "stone". Adopted in most slavic countries. Notable people with the surname include:

- Dean L. Kamen (born 1951), American inventor and businessman
- Henry Kamen, British historian
- Jack Kamen, American illustrator
- Martin Kamen, scientist
- Michael Arnold Kamen (1948–2003), American composer
- Milt Kamen (1921–1977), American actor
- Nick Kamen (1962–2021), English model and singer
- Robert Mark Kamen, American screenwriter and producer
- Hannah John-Kamen, British actress

== See also ==
- Kaman (surname)
