= Antonio Modarelli =

American classical composer

Antonio Modarelli (1894 in Braddock, Pennsylvania – 1954) was an American conductor and composer.

Though popular in Europe, even to the point of being the first American to be invited into the Gesellschaft der deutschen Komponisten, Modarelli was never really appreciated at home, being asked to resign by the board of the Pittsburgh Symphony Orchestra in 1936. Other orchestras led by Modarelli include the Wheeling Symphony Orchestra from 1937 to 1942 and West Virginia Symphony Orchestra from 1942 to 1954.
