= Kamen, Alexandrovsky District, Perm Krai =

Kamen Камень
- Settlement
- Location within Perm Krai Location within Russia
- Coordinates: 59°29′N 57°26′E
- Country: Russia
- Region: Perm Krai
- District: Alexandrovsky District
- Time zone: UTC+5:00

Kamen (Russian: Камень) is a rural locality (a settlement) in Yayvinskoye Urban Settlement, Alexandrovsky District, Perm Krai, Russia. The population was 103 as of 2010. There are 7 streets.

== Geography ==
Kamen is located 61 km north of Alexandrovsk (the district's administrative centre) by road. Baza is the nearest rural locality.
