= Kaman (surname) =

Kaman is a surname. Notable people with the surname include:

- Charles Kaman (1919–2011), American aeronautical engineer and manufacturer
- Chris Kaman (born 1982), German-American basketball player
- Kritsada Kaman (born 1999), Thai footballer
- Rob Kaman (1960–2024), Dutch kickboxer

== See also ==
- Kamen (surname)
