= May Beegle =

American impesario (1882–1943)

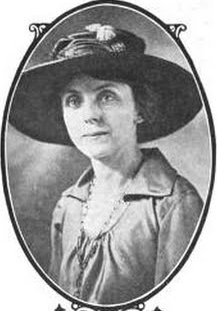
- May Beegle, from a 1919 publication.
- Born: Alice May Beegle; October 23, 1882; Bedford, Pennsylvania
- Died: December 8, 1943 (aged 61); Pittsburgh, Pennsylvania
- Occupations: theatrical manager, concert promoter

May Beegle (October 23, 1882 – December 8, 1943) was an American theatrical manager, publicist, concert promoter, and agent, known as the "dean of Pittsburgh impresarios."

== Early life ==
Alice May Beegle was born in Bedford, Pennsylvania, the daughter of Thomas Paul Beegle Sr. and Margaret Keyser Beegle. She studied piano as a girl.

== Career ==
Beegle began working as a secretary at the Pittsburgh Orchestra. She founded the Pittsburgh Orchestra Association and the Pittsburgh Friends of Music Society. She organized the Ellis Concert Series and the Sewickley Concerts before starting her own booking agency in 1923. The May Beegle concert series began in 1921 with English singer Florence Easton, and brought performing artists from Enrico Caruso and Anna Pavlova to Yehudi Menuhin and Marian Anderson to the city over the next three decades. She also promoted orchestra concerts for children, reaching thousands of students in the Pittsburgh area. She was active in the National Concert Managers' Association, and was known as the "dean of Pittsburgh impresarios." "Through May Beegle," noted a 1922 report, "Pittsburgh is promised an unusually brilliant season of orchestral and recital attractions."

During World War I she and her sister Helena Viola Beegle worked with the American Red Cross in Pittsburgh. She was a member of the Business and Professional Women's Club of Allegheny County, and of the Women's Press Club.

Beegle was sued in 1929 by Italian opera singer Pasquale Amato, after she referred to him as a "has-been."

== Personal life ==
Beegle lived with her sister Helena in Pittsburgh. May Beegle died in 1943, aged 61 years (according to her death certificate; the New York Times and Pittsburgh Post-Gazette obituaries gave her age as 56). Her brother Thomas P. Beegle continued her concert series until his death in 1946, and then his son Bill Beegle ran the May Beegle Concerts series, through 1954. The Carnegie Library of Pittsburgh holds a collection of programs from the May Beegle Concerts.
