= Kámen (Pelhřimov District) =

- Municipality
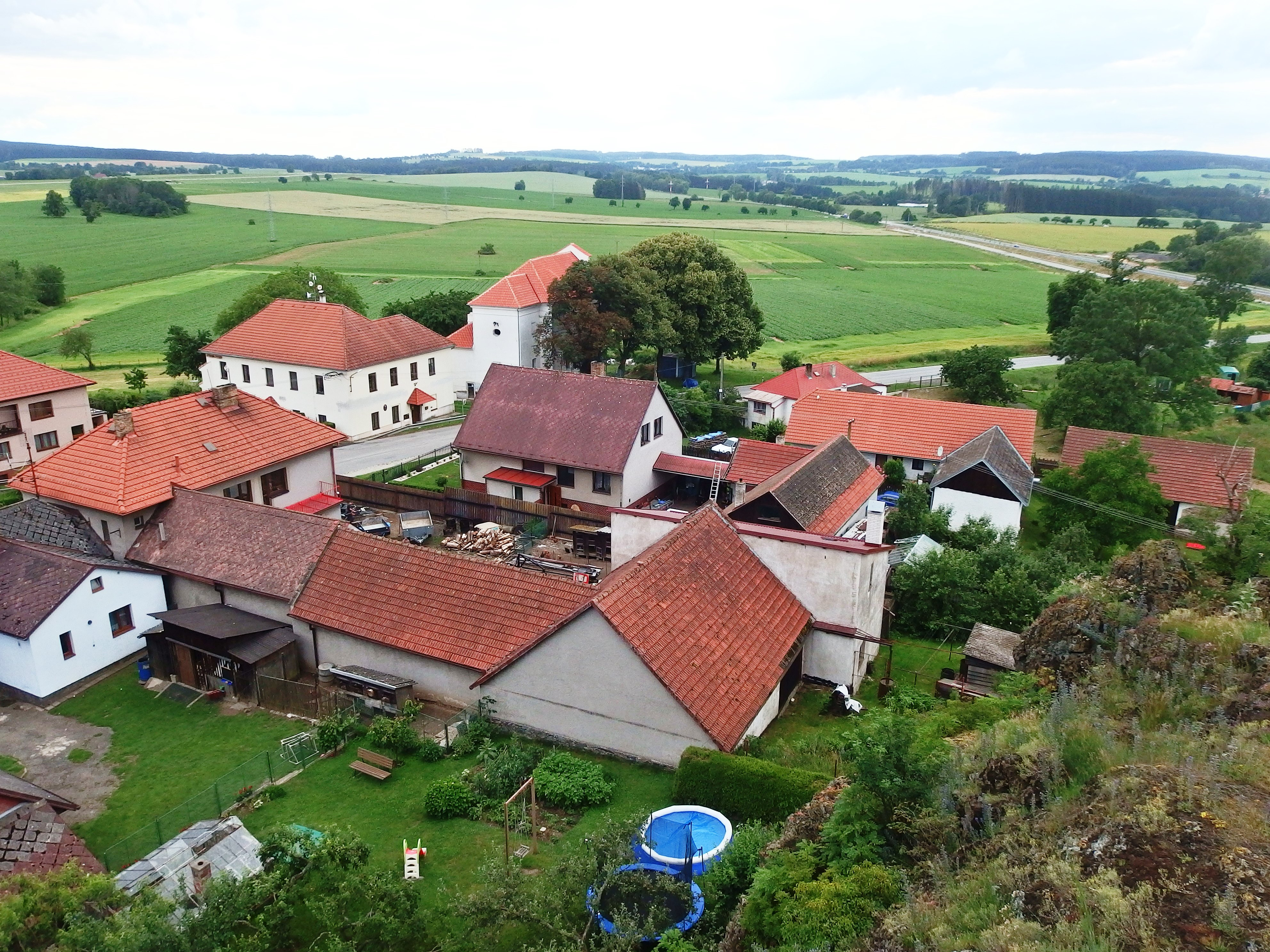
- View from the Kámen Castle

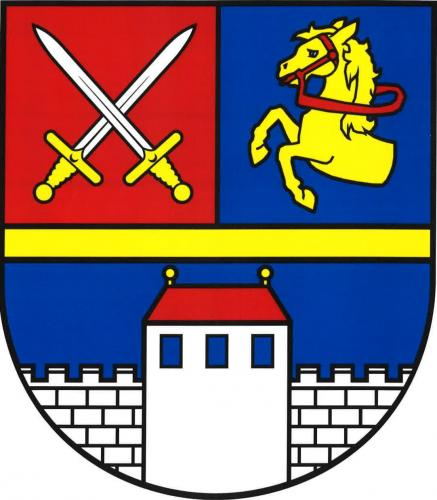
- Flag Coat of arms

- Location in the Czech Republic
- Coordinates: 49°25′24″N 15°0′57″E
- Country: Czech Republic
- Region: Vysočina
- District: Pelhřimov
- First mentioned: 1316

Area
  - Total: 8.09 km^{2} (3.12 sq mi)
- Elevation: 585 m (1,919 ft)

Population (2026-01-01)
  - Total: 270
  - Density: 33/km^{2} (86/sq mi)
- Time zone: UTC+1 (CET)
  - Summer (DST): UTC+2 (CEST)
- Postal codes: 394 13, 394 70, 395 01
- Website: obeckamen.cz

Kámen is a municipality and village in Pelhřimov District in the Vysočina Region of the Czech Republic. It has about 300 inhabitants.

== Administrative division ==
Kámen consists of three municipal parts (in brackets population according to the 2021 census):

- Kámen (240)
- Nízká Lhota (13)
- Nový Dvůr (10)

== Etymology ==
The name means 'stone' in Czech.

== Geography ==
Kámen is located about 15 kilometres (9 mi) west of Pelhřimov and 40 km (25 mi) west of Jihlava. It lies in the Křemešník Highlands. The highest point is at 607 m (1,991 ft) above sea level. There are several fishponds in the municipality.

== History ==
The first written mention of Kámen is from 1316. The oldest part of the local castle was founded in the mid-13th century. The estate was owned by the royal chamber and granted to various nobles and court officials. In 1366, Jindřich of Ciglheim established gold mines here. The estate was owned by the royal chamber until 1504. The most important owners of Kámen were the Malovec of Malovice family, who held it from 1523 until the beginning of the 18th century.

== Demographics ==
Historical population

| Year | Pop. | ±% |
|---|---|---|
| 1869 | 705 | — |
| 1880 | 563 | −20.1% |
| 1890 | 551 | −2.1% |
| 1900 | 591 | +7.3% |
| 1910 | 631 | +6.8% |

| Year | Pop. | ±% |
|---|---|---|
| 1921 | 560 | −11.3% |
| 1930 | 485 | −13.4% |
| 1950 | 363 | −25.2% |
| 1961 | 356 | −1.9% |
| 1970 | 291 | −18.3% |

| Year | Pop. | ±% |
|---|---|---|
| 1980 | 287 | −1.4% |
| 1991 | 303 | +5.6% |
| 2001 | 313 | +3.3% |
| 2011 | 243 | −22.4% |
| 2021 | 263 | +8.2% |

Source: Censuses

== Transport ==
The I/19 road (the section from Tábor to Pelhřimov) runs through the municipality.

== Sights ==
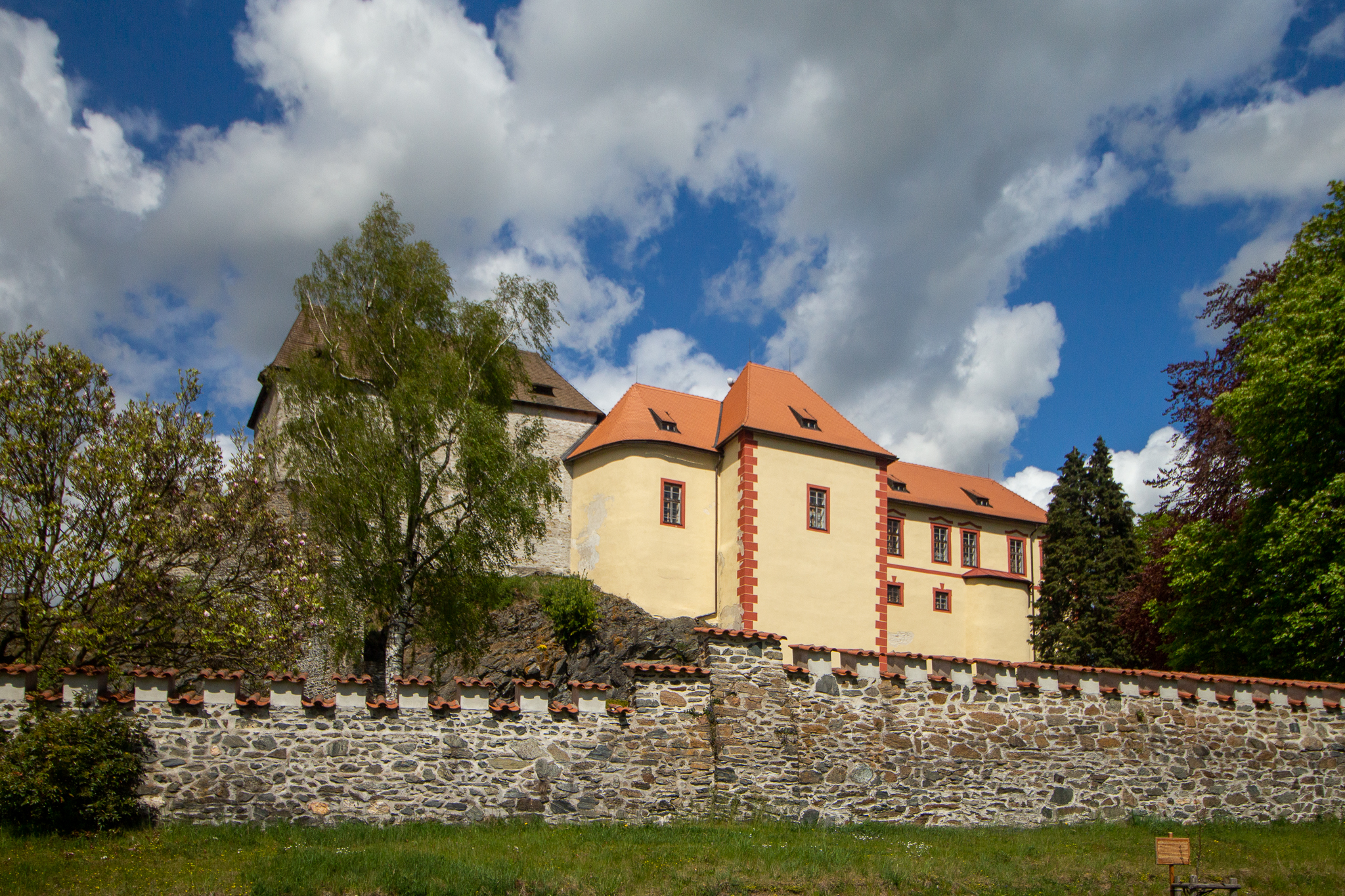
Kámen Castle

Kámen is known for the Kámen Castle. It is a medieval castle, which was rebuilt and extended in the 16th and 17th centuries. Today the castle is opened to the public and offers guided tours. It is administered by the Vysočina Museum in Jihlava.

The Chapel of Our Lady of Sorrows was built in 1667–1671. It is a valuable early Baroque chapel.
