= Kamin Mohammadi =

Exiled Iranian writer living in Britain (born 1969)

Kamin Mohammadi (born 18 September 1969) is an exiled Iranian writer living in Britain. She is also a broadcaster and journalist who specialises in Iran related topics, among other things.

== Biography ==
Kamin Mohammadi was born on 18 September 1969. She was born in Abadan, grew up in Tehran and lived in Ahvaz, Iran. She moved with family to London, United Kingdom after the Iranian Islamic Revolution in 1979. Her family adapted British traditions including celebrating Christmas and watching the Queen's speech to the nation. Her family tried to integrate into British life through adopting certain elements of British culture without ever losing any of their Iranian traditions or culture.

She rediscovered her Iranian identity in her 20s, something she avoided during her youth as it was too confusing as a child. She wrote about her experiences in The Cypress Tree: A Love Letter to Iran, published in the UK by Bloomsbury Publishing. The book was translated into Italian and published in Italy in 2012 as Mille Farfalle Nel Sole by Piemme Voci. In The Cypress Tree, she wrote about living in Iran and then fleeing to London, placing the stories against the background of historical events told through the stories of her vast family, examining the roots of the revolution in a non-partisan way that is rare in personal memoirs about this period. Bustle placed her book first on a list of books that showed the "real" Iran behind the headlines. She wrote a major article and spoke about Iraqi gas attacks on Iran and the sufferings it caused for the major British newspaper Mail on Sunday, this was nominated for a Human Rights in Journalism Award by Amnesty International. This led her to do some pro-peace activism and she spoke at the joint Action Iran and CASMII meeting in London on September 19, 2006, among many other meetings.
