= Křenice (Klatovy District) =

- Municipality
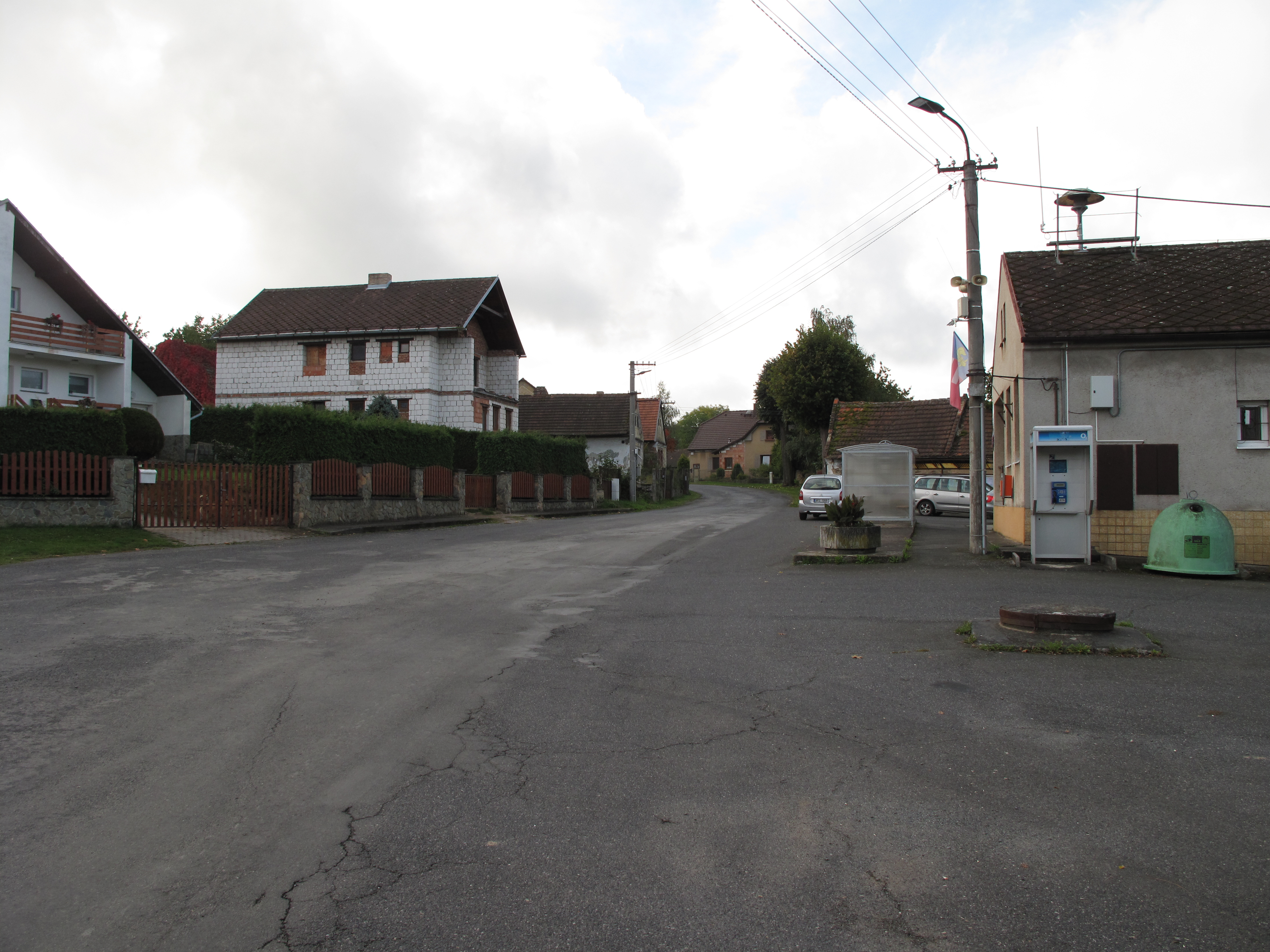
- Centre of Křenice

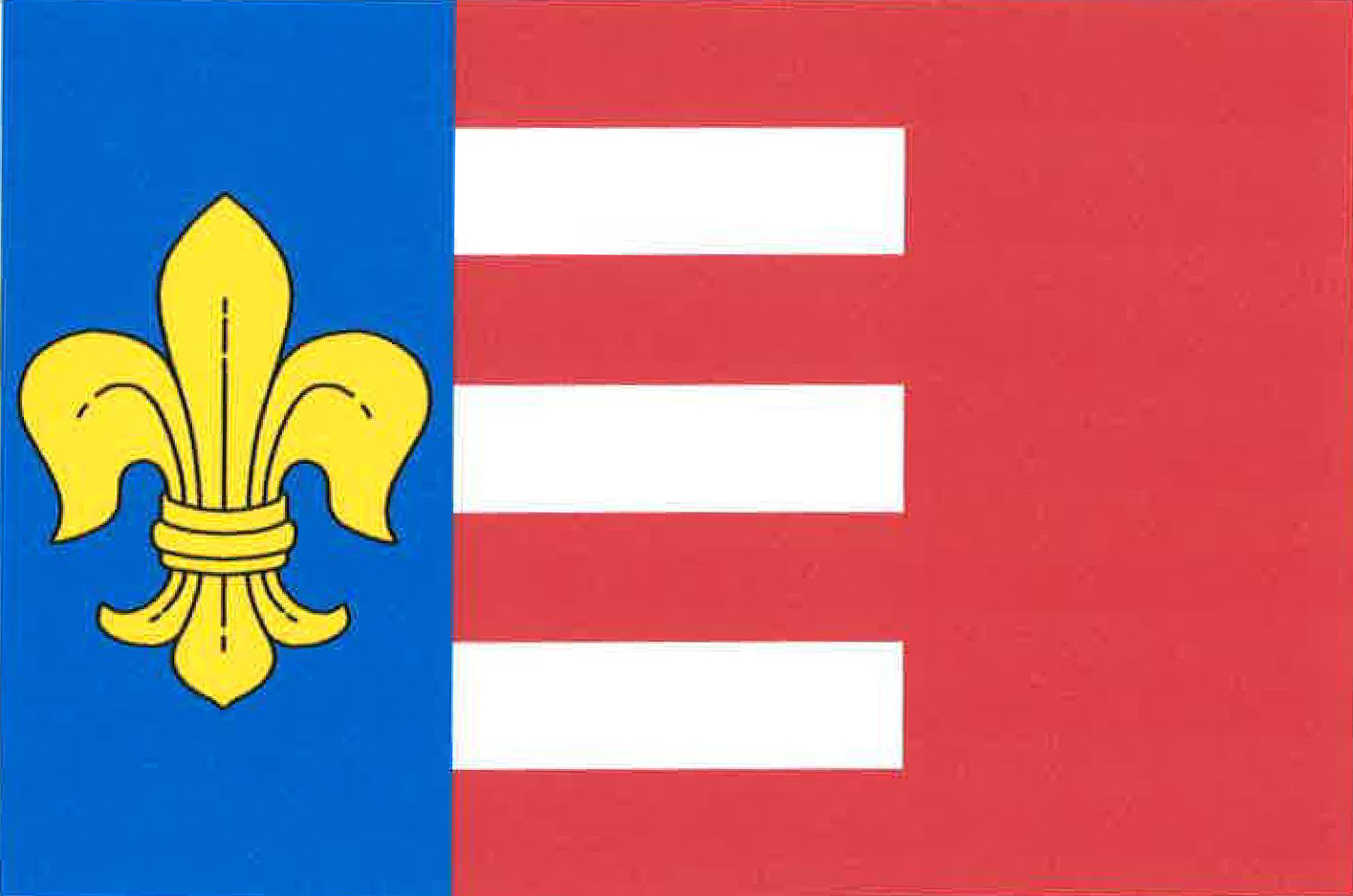
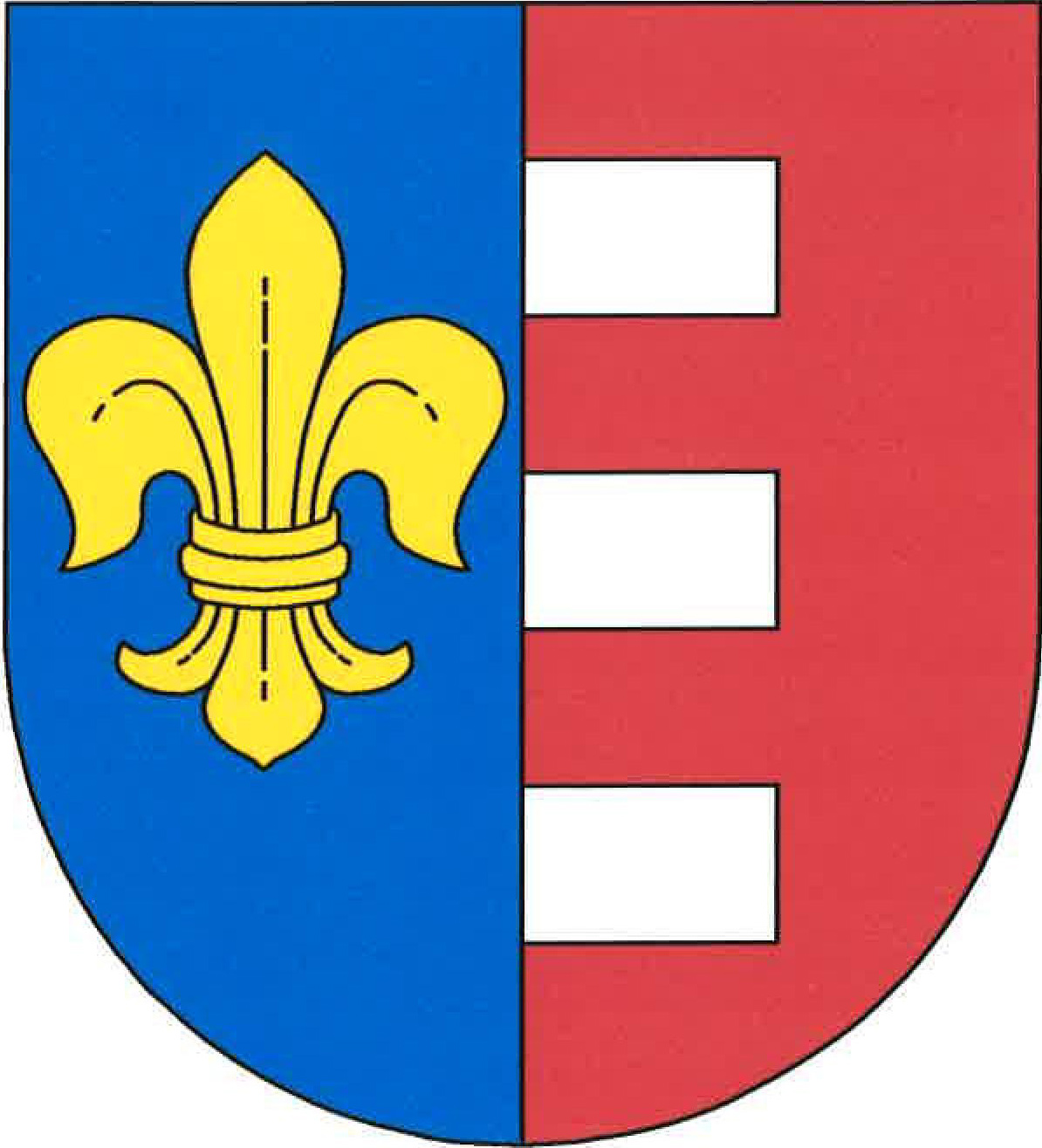
- Flag Coat of arms

- Location in the Czech Republic
- Coordinates: 49°30′10″N 13°12′1″E
- Country: Czech Republic
- Region: Plzeň
- District: Klatovy
- First mentioned: 1339

Area
  - Total: 8.75 km^{2} (3.38 sq mi)
- Elevation: 425 m (1,394 ft)

Population (2026-01-01)
  - Total: 218
  - Density: 24.9/km^{2} (64.5/sq mi)
- Time zone: UTC+1 (CET)
  - Summer (DST): UTC+2 (CEST)
- Postal code: 340 12
- Website: www.krenice.cz

Křenice is a municipality and village in Klatovy District in the Plzeň Region of the Czech Republic. It has about 200 inhabitants.

Křenice lies approximately 14 kilometres (9 mi) north-west of Klatovy, 31 km (19 mi) south-west of Plzeň, and 110 km (68 mi) south-west of Prague.

== Administrative division ==
Křenice consists of three municipal parts (in brackets population according to the 2021 census):

- Křenice (101)
- Kámen (39)
- Přetín (54)

== Demographics ==
Historical population
Year	Pop.	±%
1869	573	—
1880	611	+6.6%
1890	637	+4.3%
1900	634	−0.5%
1910	603	−4.9%
1921	593	−1.7%
1930	551	−7.1%
1950	372	−32.5%
1961	350	−5.9%
1970	297	−15.1%
1980	256	−13.8%
1991	227	−11.3%
2001	179	−21.1%
2011	180	+0.6%
2021	194	+7.8%
Source: Censuses
