= Nous =

Concept in classical philosophy

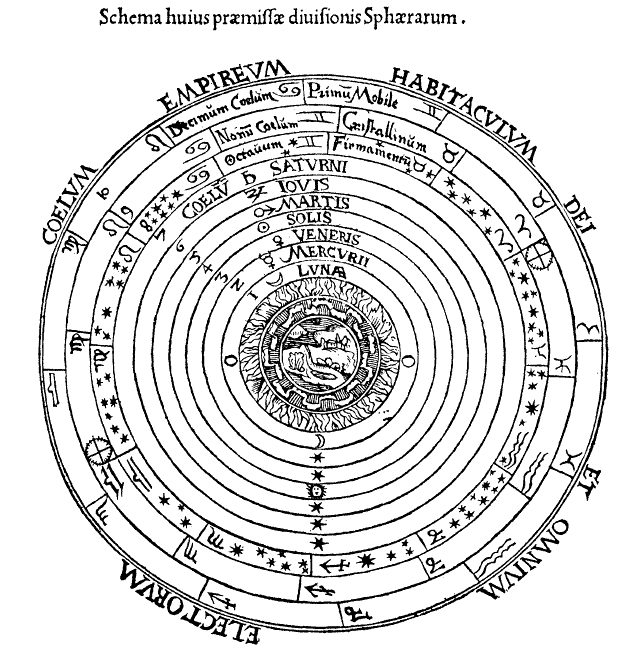
This diagram shows the medieval understanding of spheres of the cosmos, derived from Aristotle, and as per the standard explanation by Ptolemy. It came to be understood that at least the outermost sphere (marked "Primũ Mobile") has its own intellect, intelligence or nous – a cosmic equivalent to the human mind.

Nous (UK: /naʊs/, US: /nuːs/), from Ancient Greek: νοῦς, is a concept from classical philosophy, sometimes equated to intellect or intelligence, for the faculty of the human mind necessary for understanding what is true or real.

Alternative English terms used in philosophy include "understanding" and "mind"; or sometimes "thought" or "reason" (in the sense of that which reasons, not the activity of reasoning). It is also often described as something equivalent to perception except that it works within the mind ("the mind's eye"). It has been suggested that the basic meaning is something like "awareness". In colloquial British English, nous also denotes "good sense", which is close to one everyday meaning it had in Ancient Greece. The nous performed a role comparable to the modern concept of intuition.

In Aristotle's philosophy, which was influential on later conceptions of the category, nous was carefully distinguished from sense perception, imagination, and reason, although these terms are closely inter-related. The term was apparently already singled out by earlier philosophers such as Parmenides, whose works are largely lost. In post-Aristotelian discussions, the exact boundaries between perception, understanding of perception, and reasoning have sometimes diverged from Aristotelian definitions.

In the Aristotelian scheme, nous is the basic understanding or awareness that allows human beings to think rationally. For Aristotle, this was distinct from the processing of sensory perception, including the use of imagination and memory, which other animals can do. For him then, discussion of nous is connected to discussion of how the human mind sets definitions in a consistent and communicable way, and whether people must be born with some innate potential to understand the same universal categories in the same logical ways. Derived from this it was also sometimes argued, in classical and medieval philosophy, that the individual nous must require help of a spiritual and divine type. By this type of account, it also came to be argued that the human understanding (nous) somehow stems from this cosmic nous, which is however not just a recipient of order, but a creator of it. Such explanations were influential in the development of medieval accounts of God, the immortality of the soul, and even the motions of the stars, in Europe, North Africa and the Middle East, amongst both eclectic philosophers and authors representing all the major faiths of their times.

== Pre-Socratic usage ==
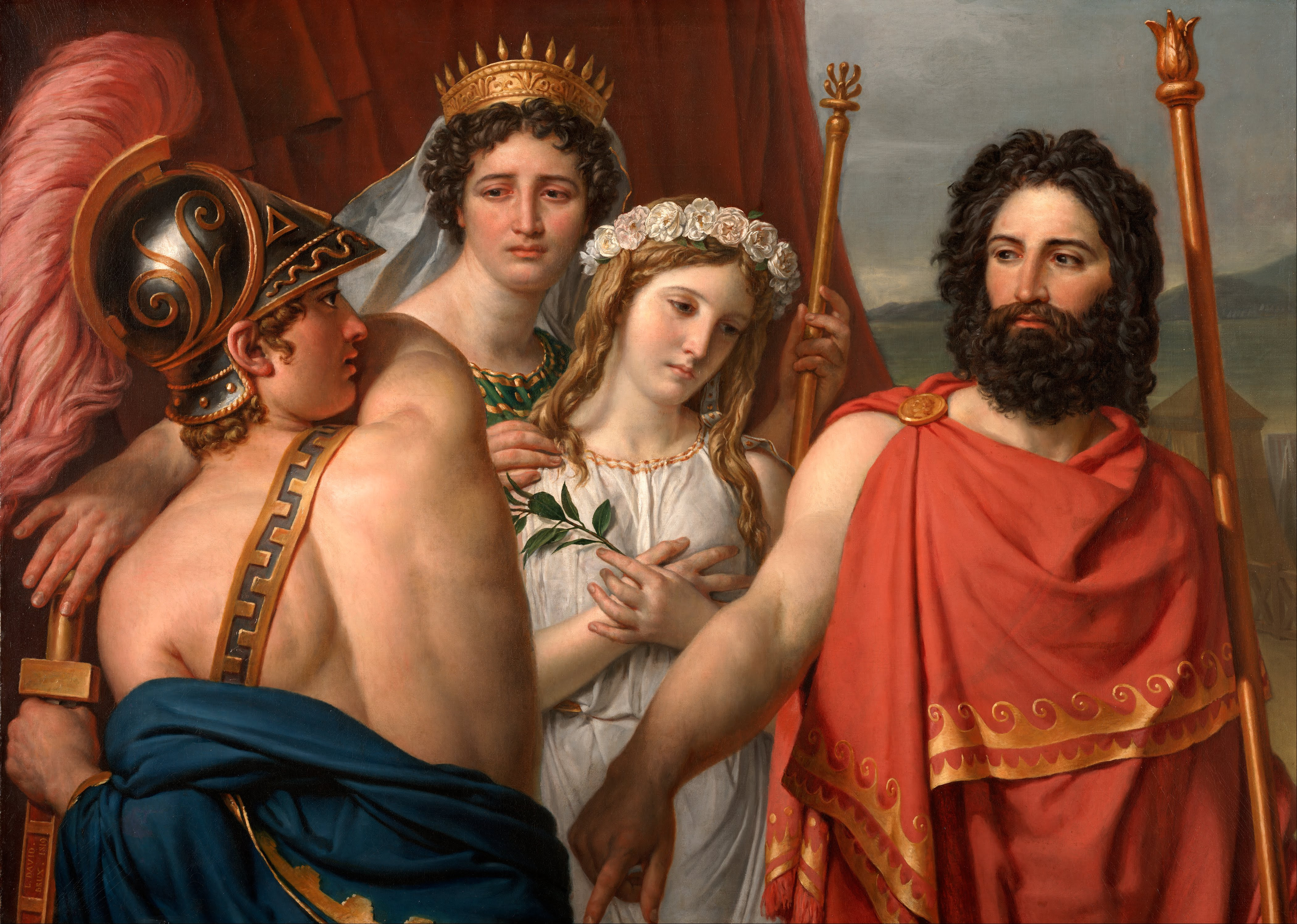
The earliest surviving text that uses the word nous is the Iliad. Agamemnon says to Achilles: "Do not thus, mighty though you are, godlike Achilles, seek to deceive me with your wit (nous); for you will not get by me nor persuade me."

In early Greek uses, Homer used nous to signify mental activities of both mortals and immortals, for example what they really have on their mind as opposed to what they say aloud. It was one of several words related to thought, thinking, and perceiving with the mind. In pre-Socratic philosophy, it became increasingly distinguished as a source of knowledge and reasoning opposed to mere sense perception or thinking influenced by the body such as emotion. For example, Heraclitus complained that "much learning does not teach nous".

Among some Greek authors, a faculty of intelligence known as a "higher mind" came to be considered as a property of the cosmos as a whole. The work of Parmenides set the scene for Greek philosophy to come, and the concept of nous was central to his radical proposals. He claimed that reality as perceived by the senses alone is not a world of truth at all, because sense perception is so unreliable, and what is perceived is so uncertain and changeable. Instead he argued for a dualism wherein nous and related words (the verb for thinking which describes its mental perceiving activity, noein, and the unchanging and eternal objects of this perception, noēta) describe another form of perception which is not physical, but intellectual only, distinct from sense perception and the objects of sense perception.

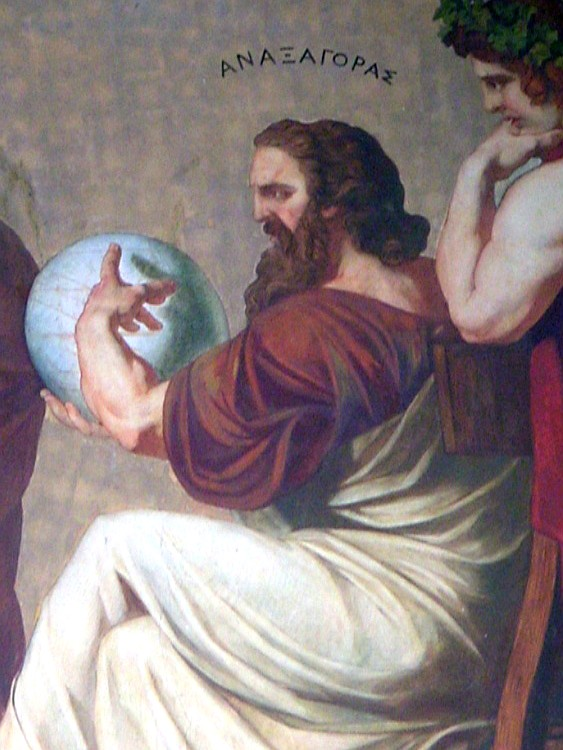
Anaxagoras

Anaxagoras, born about 500 BC, is the first person who is definitely known to have explained the concept of a nous (mind), which arranged all other things in the cosmos in their proper order, started them in a rotating motion, and continuing to control them to some extent, having an especially strong connection with living things. (However Aristotle reports an earlier philosopher, Hermotimus of Clazomenae, who had taken a similar position.) Amongst the pre-Socratic philosophers before Anaxagoras, other philosophers had proposed a similar ordering human-like principle causing life and the rotation of the heavens. For example, Empedocles, like Hesiod much earlier, described cosmic order and living things as caused by a cosmic version of love, and Pythagoras and Heraclitus, attributed the cosmos with "reason" (logos).

According to Anaxagoras the cosmos is made of infinitely divisible matter, every bit of which can inherently become anything, except Mind (nous), which is also matter, but which can only be found separated from this general mixture, or else mixed into living things, or in other words in the Greek terminology of the time, things with a soul (psychē).

Concerning cosmology, Anaxagoras, like some Greek philosophers already before him, believed the cosmos was revolving, and had formed into its visible order as a result of such revolving causing a separating and mixing of different types of chemical elements. Nous, in his system, originally caused this revolving motion to start, but it does not necessarily continue to play a role once the mechanical motion has started. His description was in other words (shockingly for the time) corporeal or mechanical, with the moon made of earth, the sun and stars made of red hot metal (beliefs Socrates was later accused of holding during his trial) and nous itself being a physically fine type of matter which also gathered and concentrated with the development of the cosmos. This nous (mind) is not incorporeal; it is the thinnest of all things. The distinction between nous and other things nevertheless causes his scheme to sometimes be described as a peculiar kind of dualism.

Anaxagoras' concept of nous was distinct from later platonic and neoplatonic cosmologies in many ways, which were also influenced by Eleatic, Pythagorean and other pre-Socratic ideas, as well as the Socratics themselves.

== Socratic philosophy ==
=== Xenophon ===
Xenophon, the less famous of the two students of Socrates whose written accounts of him have survived, recorded that he taught his students a kind of teleological justification of piety and respect for divine order in nature. This has been described as an "intelligent design" argument for the existence of God, in which nature has its own nous. For example, in his Memorabilia 1.4.8, he describes Socrates asking a friend sceptical of religion, "Are you, then, of the opinion that intelligence (nous) alone exists nowhere and that you by some good chance seized hold of it, while—as you think—those surpassingly large and infinitely numerous things [all the earth and water] are in such orderly condition through some senselessness?" Later in the same discussion he compares the nous, which directs each person's body, to the good sense (phronēsis) of the god, which is in everything, arranging things to its pleasure (1.4.17). Plato describes Socrates making the same argument in his Philebus 28d, using the same words nous and phronēsis.

=== Plato ===
Plato used the word nous in many ways that were not unusual in the everyday Greek of the time, and often simply meant "good sense" or "awareness". On the other hand, in some of his Platonic dialogues it is described by key characters in a higher sense, which was apparently already common. In his Philebus 28c he has Socrates say that "all philosophers agree—whereby they really exalt themselves—that mind (nous) is king of heaven and earth. Perhaps they are right." and later states that the ensuing discussion "confirms the utterances of those who declared of old that mind (nous) always rules the universe".

In his Cratylus, Plato gives the etymology of Athena's name, the goddess of wisdom, from Atheonóa (Ἀθεονόα) meaning "god's (theos) mind (nous)". In his Phaedo, Plato's teacher Socrates is made to say just before dying that his discovery of Anaxagoras' concept of a cosmic nous as the cause of the order of things, was an important turning point for him. But he also expressed disagreement with Anaxagoras' understanding of the implications of his own doctrine, because of Anaxagoras' materialist understanding of causation. Socrates said that Anaxagoras would "give voice and air and hearing and countless other things of the sort as causes for our talking with each other, and should fail to mention the real causes, which are, that the Athenians decided that it was best to condemn me". On the other hand, Socrates seems to suggest that he also failed to develop a fully satisfactory teleological and dualistic understanding of a mind of nature, whose aims represent the Good, which all parts of nature aim at.

Concerning the nous that is the source of understanding of individuals, Plato is widely understood to have used ideas from Parmenides in addition to Anaxagoras. Like Parmenides, Plato argued that relying on sense perception can never lead to true knowledge, only opinion. Instead, Plato's more philosophical characters argue that nous must somehow perceive truth directly in the ways gods and daimons perceive. What our mind sees directly in order to really understand things must not be the constantly changing material things, but unchanging entities that exist in a different way, the so-called "forms" or "ideas". However he knew that contemporary philosophers often argued (as in modern science) that nous and perception are just two aspects of one physical activity, and that perception is the source of knowledge and understanding (not the other way around).

Just exactly how Plato believed that the nous of people lets them come to understand things in any way that improves upon sense perception and the kind of thinking which animals have, is a subject of long running discussion and debate. On the one hand, in the Republic Plato's Socrates, in the Analogy of the Sun and Allegory of the Cave describes people as being able to perceive more clearly because of something from outside themselves, something like when the sun shines, helping eyesight. The source of this illumination for the intellect is referred to as the Form of the Good. On the other hand, in the Meno for example, Plato's Socrates explains the theory of anamnesis whereby people are born with ideas already in their soul, which they somehow remember from previous lives. Both theories were to become highly influential.

As in Xenophon, Plato's Socrates frequently describes the soul in a political way, with ruling parts, and parts that are by nature meant to be ruled. Nous is associated with the rational (logistikon) part of the individual human soul, which by nature should rule. In his Republic, in the so-called "analogy of the divided line", it has a special function within this rational part. Plato tended to treat nous as the only immortal part of the soul.

Concerning the cosmos, in the Timaeus, the title character also tells a "likely story" in which nous is responsible for the creative work of the demiurge or maker who brought rational order to our universe. This craftsman imitated what he perceived in the world of eternal Forms. In the Philebus Socrates argues that nous in individual humans must share in a cosmic nous, in the same way that human bodies are made up of small parts of the elements found in the rest of the universe. And this nous must be in the genos of being a cause of all particular things as particular things.

=== Aristotle ===
Like Plato, Aristotle saw the nous or intellect of an individual as somehow similar to sense perception but also distinct. Sense perception in action provides images to the nous, via the "sensus communis" and imagination, without which thought could not occur. But other animals have sensus communis and imagination, whereas none of them have nous. Aristotelians divide perception of forms into the animal-like one which perceives species sensibilis or sensible forms, and species intelligibilis that are perceived in a different way by the nous.

Like Plato, Aristotle linked nous to logos (reason) as uniquely human, but he also distinguished nous from logos, thereby distinguishing the faculty for setting definitions from the faculty that uses them to reason with. In his Nicomachean Ethics, Book VI Aristotle divides the soul (psychē) into two parts, one which has reason and one which does not, but then divides the part which has reason into the reasoning (logistikos) part itself which is lower, and the higher "knowing" (epistēmonikos) part which contemplates general principles (archai). Nous, he states, is the source of the first principles or sources (archai) of definitions, and it develops naturally as people gain experience. This he explains after first comparing the four other truth revealing capacities of soul: technical know how (technē), logically deduced knowledge (epistēmē, sometimes translated as "scientific knowledge"), practical wisdom (phronēsis), and lastly theoretical wisdom (sophia), which is defined by Aristotle as the combination of nous and epistēmē. All of these others apart from nous are types of reason (logos).

And intellect [nous] is directed at what is ultimate on both sides, since it is intellect and not reason [logos] that is directed at both the first terms [horoi] and the ultimate particulars, on the one side at the changeless first terms in demonstrations, and on the other side, in thinking about action, at the other sort of premise, the variable particular; for these particulars are the sources [archai] from which one discerns that for the sake of which an action is, since the universals are derived from the particulars. Hence intellect is both a beginning and an end, since the demonstrations that are derived from these particulars are also about these. And of these one must have perception, and this perception is intellect.

Aristotle's philosophical works continue many of the same Socratic themes as his teacher Plato. Amongst the new proposals he made was a way of explaining causality, and nous is an important part of his explanation. As mentioned above, Plato criticized Anaxagoras' materialism, or understanding that the intellect of nature only set the cosmos in motion, but is no longer seen as the cause of physical events. Aristotle explained that the changes of things can be described in terms of four causes at the same time. Two of these four causes are similar to the materialist understanding: each thing has a material which causes it to be how it is, and some other thing which set in motion or initiated some process of change. But at the same time according to Aristotle each thing is also caused by the natural forms they are tending to become, and the natural ends or aims, which somehow exist in nature as causes, even in cases where human plans and aims are not involved. These latter two causes (the "formal" and "final") encompass the continuous effect of the intelligent ordering principle of nature itself. Aristotle's special description of causality is especially apparent in the natural development of living things. It leads to a method whereby Aristotle analyses causation and motion in terms of the potentialities and actualities of all things, whereby all matter possesses various possibilities or potentialities of form and end, and these possibilities become more fully real as their potential forms become actual or active reality (something they will do on their own, by nature, unless stopped because of other natural things happening). For example, a stone has in its nature the potentiality of falling to the earth and it will do so, and actualize this natural tendency, if nothing is in the way.

Aristotle analyzed thinking in the same way. For him, the possibility of understanding rests on the relationship between intellect and sense perception. Aristotle's remarks on the concept of what came to be called the "active intellect" and "passive intellect" (along with various other terms) are amongst "the most intensely studied sentences in the history of philosophy". The terms are derived from a single passage in Aristotle's De Anima, Book III.

The passage tries to explain "how the human intellect passes from its original state, in which it does not think, to a subsequent state, in which it does" according to his distinction between potentiality and actuality. Aristotle says that the passive intellect receives the intelligible forms of things, but that the active intellect is required to make the potential knowledge into actual knowledge, in the same way that light makes potential colours into actual colours. As Davidson remarks:

Just what Aristotle meant by potential intellect and active intellect—terms not even explicit in the De anima and at best implied—and just how he understood the interaction between them remains moot. Students of the history of philosophy continue to debate Aristotle's intent, particularly the question whether he considered the active intellect to be an aspect of the human soul or an entity existing independently of man.

The passage is often read together with Metaphysics, Book XII, ch. 7–10, where Aristotle makes nous as an actuality a central subject within a discussion of the cause of being and the cosmos. In that book, Aristotle equates active nous, when people think and their nous becomes what they think about, with the "unmoved mover" of the universe, and God: "For the actuality of thought (nous) is life, and God is that actuality; and the essential actuality of God is life most good and eternal." Alexander of Aphrodisias, for example, equated this active intellect which is God with the one explained in De Anima, while Themistius thought they could not be simply equated. (See below.)

Like Plato before him, Aristotle believes Anaxagoras' cosmic nous implies and requires the cosmos to have intentions or ends: "Anaxagoras makes the Good a principle as causing motion; for Mind (nous) moves things, but moves them for some end, and therefore there must be some other Good—unless it is as we say; for on our view the art of medicine is in a sense health."

In the philosophy of Aristotle the soul (psyche) of a body is what makes it alive, and is its actualized form; thus, every living thing, including plant life, has a soul. The mind or intellect (nous) can be described variously as a power, faculty, part, or aspect of the human soul. For Aristotle, soul and nous are not the same. He did not rule out the possibility that nous might survive without the rest of the soul, as in Plato, but he specifically says that this immortal nous does not include any memories or anything else specific to an individual's life. In his Generation of Animals Aristotle specifically says that while other parts of the soul come from the parents, physically, the human nous, must come from outside, into the body, because it is divine or godly, and it has nothing in common with the energeia of the body. This was yet another passage which Alexander of Aphrodisias would link to those mentioned above from De Anima and the Metaphysics in order to understand Aristotle's intentions.

=== Post-Aristotelian classical theories ===
Until the early modern era, much of the discussion which has survived today concerning nous or intellect, in Europe, Africa and the Middle East, concerned how to correctly interpret Aristotle and Plato. However, at least during the classical period, materialist philosophies, more similar to modern science, such as Epicureanism, were still relatively common. The Epicureans believed that the bodily senses themselves were not the cause of error, but the interpretations can be. The term prolepsis was used by Epicureans to describe the way the mind forms general concepts from sense perceptions.

To the Stoics, more like Heraclitus than Anaxagoras, order in the cosmos comes from an entity called logos, the cosmic reason. But as in Anaxagoras this cosmic reason, like human reason but higher, is connected to the reason of individual humans. The Stoics however, did not invoke incorporeal causation, but attempted to explain physics and human thinking in terms of matter and forces. As in Aristotelianism, they explained the interpretation of sense data requiring the mind to be stamped or formed with ideas, and that people have shared conceptions that help them make sense of things (koine ennoia). Nous for them is soul "somehow disposed" (pôs echon), the soul being somehow disposed pneuma, which is fire or air or a mixture. As in Plato, they treated nous as the ruling part of the soul.

Plutarch criticized the Stoic idea of nous being corporeal, and agreed with Plato that the soul is more divine than the body while nous (mind) is more divine than the soul. The mix of soul and body produces pleasure and pain; the conjunction of mind and soul produces reason which is the cause or the source of virtue and vice. (From: “On the Face in the Moon”)

Albinus was one of the earliest authors to equate Aristotle's nous as prime mover of the Universe, with Plato's Form of the Good.

==== Alexander of Aphrodisias ====
Alexander of Aphrodisias was a Peripatetic (Aristotelian) and his On the Soul (referred to as De anima in its traditional Latin title), explained that by his interpretation of Aristotle, potential intellect in man, that which has no nature but receives one from the active intellect, is material, and also called the "material intellect" (nous hulikos) and it is inseparable from the body, being "only a disposition" of it. He argued strongly against the doctrine of immortality. On the other hand, he identified the active intellect (nous poietikos), through whose agency the potential intellect in man becomes actual, not with anything from within people, but with the divine creator itself. In the early Renaissance his doctrine of the soul's mortality was adopted by Pietro Pomponazzi against the Thomists and the Averroists. For him, the only possible human immortality is an immortality of a detached human thought, more specifically when the nous has as the object of its thought the active intellect itself, or another incorporeal intelligible form.

Alexander was also responsible for influencing the development of several more technical terms concerning the intellect, which became very influential amongst the great Islamic philosophers, Al-Farabi, Avicenna, and Averroes.

- The intellect in habitu is a stage in which the human intellect has taken possession of a repertoire of thoughts, and so is potentially able to think those thoughts, but is not yet thinking these thoughts.
- The intellect from outside, which became the "acquired intellect" in Islamic philosophy, describes the incorporeal active intellect which comes from outside man, and becomes an object of thought, making the material intellect actual and active. This term may have come from a particularly expressive translation of Alexander into Arabic. Plotinus also used such a term. In any case, in Al-Farabi and Avicenna, the term took on a new meaning, distinguishing it from the active intellect in any simple sense—an ultimate stage of the human intellect where a kind of close relationship (a "conjunction") is made between a person's active intellect and the transcendental nous itself.

==== Themistius ====
Themistius, another influential commentator on this matter, understood Aristotle differently, stating that the passive or material intellect does "not employ a bodily organ for its activity, is wholly unmixed with the body, impassive, and separate [from matter]". This means the human potential intellect, and not only the active intellect, is an incorporeal substance, or a disposition of incorporeal substance. For Themistius, the human soul becomes immortal "as soon as the active intellect intertwines with it at the outset of human thought".

This understanding of the intellect was also very influential for Al-Farabi, Avicenna, and Averroes, and "virtually all Islamic and Jewish philosophers". On the other hand, concerning the active intellect, like Alexander and Plotinus, he saw this as a transcendent being existing above and outside man. Differently from Alexander, he did not equate this being with the first cause of the Universe itself, but something lower. However he equated it with Plato's Idea of the Good.

== Gnosticism ==
Gnosticism is a collection of syncretic religious ideas and systems that coalesced in the late 1st century AD among early Christian sects.

=== Valentinus ===
In Valentinianism, Nous is the first male Aeon. Together with his conjugate female Aeon, Aletheia (truth), he emanates from the Propator Bythos (Προπάτωρ Βυθος "Forefather Depths") and his co-eternal Ennoia (Ἔννοια "Thought") or Sigē (Σιγή "Silence"); and these four form the primordial Tetrad. Like the other male Aeons he is sometimes regarded as androgynous, including in himself the female Aeon who is paired with him. He is the Only Begotten; and is styled the Father, the Beginning of All, inasmuch as from him are derived immediately or mediately the remaining Aeons who complete the Ogdoad (eight), thence the Decad (ten), and thence the Dodecad (twelve); in all, thirty Aeons constitute the Pleroma.

He alone is capable of knowing the Propator; but when he desired to impart like knowledge to the other Aeons, was withheld from so doing by Sigē. When Sophia ("Wisdom"), youngest Aeon of the thirty, was brought into peril by her yearning after this knowledge, Nous was foremost of the Aeons in interceding for her. From him, or through him from the Propator, Horos was sent to restore her. After her restoration, Nous, according to the providence of the Propator, produced another pair, Christ and the Holy Spirit, "in order to give fixity and steadfastness (εις πήξιν και στηριγμόν) to the Pleroma." For this Christ teaches the Aeons to be content to know that the Propator is in himself incomprehensible, and can be perceived only through the Only Begotten (Nous).

=== Ophites ===
The Ophites held that the demiurge Ialdabaoth, after coming into conflict with the archons he created, created a son, Ophiomorphus, who is called the serpent-formed Nous. This entity would become the serpent in the garden, who was compelled to act on behest of Sophia.

=== Basilides ===
A similar conception of Nous appears in the later teaching of the Basilidians, according to which he is the first begotten of the Unbegotten Father, and himself the parent of Logos, from whom emanate successively Phronesis, Sophia, and Dunamis. But in this teaching, Nous is identified with Christ, is named Jesus, is sent to save those that believe, and returns to Him who sent him, after a Passion which is apparent only, Simon of Cyrene being substituted for him on the cross. It is probable, however, that Nous had a place in the original system of Basilides himself; for his Ogdoad, "the great Archon of the universe, the ineffable" is apparently made up of the five members named by Irenaeus (as above), together with two whom we find in Clement of Alexandria, Dikaiosyne and Eirene, added to the originating Father.

=== Simon Magus ===
The antecedent of these systems is that of Simon, of whose six "roots" emanating from the Unbegotten Fire, Nous is first. The correspondence of these "roots" with the first six Aeons that Valentinus derives from Bythos, is noted by Hippolytus. Simon says in his Apophasis Megalē,

There are two offshoots of the entire ages, having neither beginning nor end.... Of these the one appears from above, the great power, the Nous of the universe, administering all things, male; the other from beneath, the great Epinoia, female, bringing forth all things.

To Nous and Epinoia correspond Heaven and Earth, in the list given by Simon of the six material counterparts of his six emanations. The identity of this list with the six material objects alleged by Herodotus to be worshipped by the Persians, together with the supreme place given by Simon to Fire as the primordial power, leads us to look to Iran for the origin of these systems in one aspect. In another, they connect themselves with the teaching of Pythagoras and of Plato.

=== Gospel of Mary ===
According to the Gospel of Mary, Jesus himself articulates the essence of Nous:

There where is the nous, lies the treasure." Then I said to him: "Lord, when someone meets you in a Moment of Vision, is it through the soul [psychē] that they see, or is it through the spirit [pneuma]?" The Teacher answered: "It is neither through the soul nor the spirit, but the nous between the two which sees the vision...

— The Gospel of Mary, p. 10

=== Mandaeism ===
In Mandaic, mana (ࡌࡀࡍࡀ) has been variously translated as "mind," "nous," or "treasure." The Mandaean formula "I am a mana of the Great Life" is a phrase often found in the numerous hymns of Book 2 of the Left Ginza.

== Plotinus and Neoplatonism ==
Of the later Greek and Roman writers Plotinus, the initiator of neoplatonism, is particularly significant. Like Alexander of Aphrodisias and Themistius, he saw himself as a commentator explaining the doctrines of Plato and Aristotle. But in his Enneads he went further than those authors, often working from passages which had been presented more tentatively, possibly inspired partly by earlier authors such as the neopythagorean Numenius of Apamea. Neoplatonism provided a major inspiration to discussion concerning the intellect in late classical and medieval philosophy, theology and cosmology.

In neoplatonism there exists several levels or hypostases of being, including the natural and visible world as a lower part.

- The Monad or "the One" sometimes also described as "the Good", based on the concept as it is found in Plato. This is the dunamis or possibility of existence. It causes the other levels by emanation.
- The Nous (usually translated as "Intellect", or "Intelligence" in this context, or sometimes "mind" or "reason") is described as God, or more precisely an image of God. It thinks its own contents, which are thoughts, equated to the Platonic ideas or forms (eide). The thinking of this Intellect is the highest activity of life. The actualization (energeia) of this thinking is the being of the forms. This Intellect is the first principle or foundation of existence. The One is prior to it, but not in the sense that a normal cause is prior to an effect, but instead Intellect is called an emanation of the One. The One is the possibility of this foundation of existence.
- Soul (psychē). The soul is also an energeia: it acts upon or actualizes its own thoughts and creates "a separate, material cosmos that is the living image of the spiritual or noetic Cosmos contained as a unified thought within the Intelligence". So it is the soul which perceives things in nature physically, which it understands to be reality. Soul in Plotinus plays a role similar to the potential intellect in Aristotelian terminology.
- Lowest is matter.

This was based largely upon Plotinus' reading of Plato, but also incorporated many Aristotelian concepts, including the unmoved mover as energeia. They also incorporated a theory of anamnesis, or knowledge coming from the past lives of our immortal souls, like that found in some of Plato's dialogues.

Later Platonists distinguished a hierarchy of three separate manifestations of nous, like Numenius of Apamea had.

== Medieval nous in religion ==
Greek philosophy had an influence on the major religions that defined the Middle Ages, and one aspect of this was the concept of nous.

=== Medieval Islamic philosophy ===
During the Middle Ages, philosophy itself was in many places seen as opposed to the prevailing monotheistic religions, Islam, Christianity and Judaism. The strongest philosophical tradition for some centuries was amongst Islamic philosophers, who later came to strongly influence the late medieval philosophers of western Christendom, and the Jewish diaspora in the Mediterranean area. While there were earlier Muslim philosophers such as Al-Kindi, chronologically the three most influential concerning the intellect were Al-Farabi, Avicenna, and finally Averroes, a westerner who lived in Spain and was highly influential in the late Middle Ages amongst Jewish and Christian philosophers.

==== Al-Farabi ====
The exact precedents of al-Farabi's influential philosophical scheme, in which nous (Arabic ʿaql) plays an important role, are no longer perfectly clear because of the great loss of texts in the Middle Ages which he would have had access to. He was apparently innovative in at least some points. He was clearly influenced by the same late classical world as neoplatonism, neopythagoreanism, but exactly how is less clear. Plotinus, Themistius and Alexander of Aphrodisias are generally accepted to have been influences. However while these three all placed the active intellect "at or near the top of the hierarchy of being", al-Farabi was clear in making it the lowest ranking in a series of distinct transcendental intelligences. He is the first known person to have done this in a clear way. One possible inspiration mentioned in a commentary of Aristotle's De Anima attributed to John Philoponus is a philosopher named Marinus, who was probably a student of Proclus. He in any case designated the active intellect to be angelic or daimonic, rather than the creator itself. He was also the first philosopher known to have assumed the existence of a causal hierarchy of celestial spheres, and the incorporeal intelligences parallel to those spheres. Al-Farabi also fitted an explanation of prophecy into this scheme, in two levels. According to Davidson (p. 59):

The lower of the two levels, labeled specifically as "prophecy" (nubuwwa), is enjoyed by men who have not yet perfected their intellect, whereas the higher, which Alfarabi sometimes specifically names "revelation" (w-ḥ-y), comes exclusively to those who stand at the stage of acquired intellect.

This happens in the imagination (Arabic mutakhayyila; Greek phantasia), a faculty of the mind already described by Aristotle, which al-Farabi described as serving the rational part of the soul (Arabic ʿaql; Greek nous). This faculty of imagination stores sense perceptions (maḥsūsāt), disassembles or recombines them, creates figurative or symbolic images (muḥākāt) of them which then appear in dreams, visualizes present and predicted events in a way different from conscious deliberation (rawiyya). This is under the influence, according to al-Farabi, of the active intellect. Theoretical truth can only be received by this faculty in a figurative or symbolic form, because the imagination is a physical capability and can not receive theoretical information in a proper abstract form. This rarely comes in a waking state, but more often in dreams. The lower type of prophecy is the best possible for the imaginative faculty, but the higher type of prophecy requires not only a receptive imagination, but also the condition of an "acquired intellect", where the human nous is in "conjunction" with the active intellect in the sense of God. Such a prophet is also a philosopher. When a philosopher-prophet has the necessary leadership qualities, he becomes philosopher-king.

==== Avicenna ====
In terms of cosmology, according to Davidson (p. 82), "Avicenna's universe has a structure virtually identical with the structure of Alfarabi's" but there are differences in details. As in al-Farabi, there are several levels of intellect, intelligence or nous, each of the higher ones being associated with a celestial sphere. Avicenna however details three different types of effect which each of these higher intellects has, each "thinks" both the necessary existence and the possible being of the intelligence one level higher. And each "emanates" downwards the body and soul of its own celestial sphere, and also the intellect at the next lowest level. The active intellect, as in Alfarabi, is the last in the chain. Avicenna sees active intellect as the cause not only of intelligible thought and the forms in the "sublunar" world we people live, but also the matter. (In other words, three effects.)

Concerning the workings of the human soul, Avicenna, like al-Farabi, sees the "material intellect" or potential intellect as something that is not material. He believed the soul was incorporeal, and the potential intellect was a disposition of it which was in the soul from birth. As in al-Farabi there are two further stages of potential for thinking, which are not yet actual thinking, first the mind acquires the most basic intelligible thoughts which we can not think in any other way, such as "the whole is greater than the part", then comes a second level of derivative intelligible thoughts which could be thought. Concerning the actualization of thought, Avicenna applies the term "to two different things, to actual human thought, irrespective of the intellectual progress a man has made, and to actual thought when human intellectual development is complete", as in al-Farabi.

When reasoning in the sense of deriving conclusions from syllogisms, Avicenna says people are using a physical "cogitative" faculty (mufakkira, fikra) of the soul, which can err. The human cogitative faculty is the same as the "compositive imaginative faculty (mutakhayyila) in reference to the animal soul". But some people can use "insight" to avoid this step and derive conclusions directly by conjoining with the active intellect.

Once a thought has been learned in a soul, the physical faculties of sense perception and imagination become unnecessary, and as a person acquires more thoughts, their soul becomes less connected to their body. For Avicenna, different from the normal Aristotelian position, all of the soul is by nature immortal. But the level of intellectual development does affect the type of afterlife that the soul can have. Only a soul which has reached the highest type of conjunction with the active intellect can form a perfect conjunction with it after the death of the body, and this is a supreme eudaimonia. Lesser intellectual achievement means a less happy or even painful afterlife.<

Concerning prophecy, Avicenna identifies a broader range of possibilities which fit into this model, which is still similar to that of al-Farabi.

==== Averroes ====
Averroes came to be regarded even in Europe as "the Commentator" to "the Philosopher", Aristotle, and his study of the questions surrounding the nous were very influential amongst Jewish and Christian philosophers, with some aspects being quite controversial. According to Herbert Davidson, Averroes' doctrine concerning nous can be divided into two periods. In the first, neoplatonic emanationism, not found in the original works of Aristotle, was combined with a naturalistic explanation of the human material intellect. "It also insists on the material intellect's having an active intellect as a direct object of thought and conjoining with the active intellect, notions never expressed in the Aristotelian canon." It was this presentation which Jewish philosophers such as Moses Narboni and Gersonides understood to be Averroes'. In the later model of the universe, which was transmitted to Christian philosophers, Averroes "dismisses emanationism and explains the generation of living beings in the sublunar world naturalistically, all in the name of a more genuine Aristotelianism. Yet it abandons the earlier naturalistic conception of the human material intellect and transforms the material intellect into something wholly un-Aristotelian, a single transcendent entity serving all mankind. It nominally salvages human conjunction with the active intellect, but in words that have little content."

This position, that humankind shares one active intellect, was taken up by Parisian philosophers such as Siger of Brabant, but also widely rejected by philosophers such as Albertus Magnus, Thomas Aquinas, Ramon Lull, and Duns Scotus. Despite being widely considered heretical, the position was later defended by many more European philosophers including John of Jandun, who was the primary link bringing this doctrine from Paris to Bologna. After him this position continued to be defended and also rejected by various writers in northern Italy. In the 16th century it finally became a less common position after the renewal of an "Alexandrian" position based on that of Alexander of Aphrodisias, associated with Pietro Pomponazzi.

=== Christianity ===
The Christian New Testament makes mention of the nous or noos, generally translated in modern English as "mind", but also showing a link to God's will or law:

- Romans 7:23, refers to the law (nomos) of God which is the law in the writer's nous, as opposed to the law of sin which is in the body.
- Romans 12:2, demands Christians should not conform to this world, but continuously be transformed by the renewing of their nous, so as to be able to determine what God’s will is.
- 1 Corinthians 14:14–19 Discusses "speaking in tongues" and says that a person who speaks in tongues that they can not understand should prefer to also have understanding (nous), and it is better for the listeners also to be able to understand.
- Ephesians 4:17–23 Discusses how non-Christians have a worthless nous, while Christians should seek to renew the spirit (pneuma) of their nous.
- 2 Thessalonians 2:2. Uses the term to refer to being troubled of mind.
- Revelation 17:9: "here is the nous which has wisdom".

In the writings of the Christian fathers a sound or pure nous is considered essential to the cultivation of wisdom.

==== Philosophers influencing western Christianity ====
While philosophical works were not commonly read or taught in the early Middle Ages in most of Europe, the works of authors like Boethius and Augustine of Hippo formed an important exception. Both were influenced by neoplatonism, and were amongst the older works that were still known in the time of the Carolingian Renaissance, and the beginnings of Scholasticism.

In his early years Augustine was heavily influenced by Manichaeism and afterwards by the Neoplatonism of Plotinus. After his conversion to Christianity and baptism (387), he developed his own approach to philosophy and theology, accommodating a variety of methods and different perspectives.

Augustine used Neoplatonism selectively. He used both the neoplatonic Nous, and the Platonic Form of the Good (or "The Idea of the Good") as equivalent terms for the Christian God, or at least for one particular aspect of God. For example, God, nous, can act directly upon matter, and not only through souls, and concerning the souls through which it works upon the world experienced by humanity, some are treated as angels.

Scholasticism becomes more clearly defined much later, as the peculiar native type of philosophy in medieval catholic Europe. In this period, Aristotle became "the Philosopher", and scholastic philosophers, like their Jewish and Muslim contemporaries, studied the concept of the intellectus on the basis not only of Aristotle, but also late classical interpreters like Augustine and Boethius. A European tradition of new and direct interpretations of Aristotle developed which was eventually strong enough to argue with partial success against some of the interpretations of Aristotle from the Islamic world, most notably Averroes' doctrine of their being one "active intellect" for all humanity. Notable "Catholic" (as opposed to Averroist) Aristotelians included Albertus Magnus and Thomas Aquinas, the founder of Thomism, which exists to this day in various forms. Concerning the nous, Thomism agrees with those Aristotelians who insist that the intellect is immaterial and separate from any bodily organs, but as per Christian doctrine, the whole of the human soul is immortal, not only the intellect.

==== Eastern Orthodox ====
The human nous in Eastern Orthodox Christianity is the "eye of the heart or soul" or the "mind of the heart". The soul of man is created by God in His image; man's soul is intelligent and noetic. Saint Thalassius of Syria wrote that God created beings "with a capacity to receive the Spirit and to attain knowledge of Himself; He has brought into existence the senses and sensory perception to serve such beings". Eastern Orthodox Christians hold that God did this by creating mankind with intelligence and noetic faculties.

Human reasoning is not enough: there will always remain an "irrational residue" which escapes analysis and which can not be expressed in concepts: it is this unknowable depth of things, that which constitutes their true, indefinable essence that also reflects the origin of things in God. In Eastern Christianity it is by faith or intuitive truth that this component of an object’s existence is grasped. Though God through his energies draws us to him, his essence remains inaccessible. The operation of faith being the means of free will by which mankind faces the future or unknown, these noetic operations contained in the concept of insight or noesis. Faith (pistis) is therefore sometimes used interchangeably with noesis in Eastern Christianity.

Angels have intelligence and nous, whereas men have reason, both logos and dianoia, nous and sensory perception. This follows the idea that man is a microcosm and an expression of the whole creation or macrocosmos. The human nous was darkened after the Fall of Man (which was the result of the rebellion of reason against the nous), but after the purification (healing or correction) of the nous (achieved through ascetic practices like hesychasm), the human nous (the "eye of the heart") will see God's uncreated Light (and feel God's uncreated love and beauty, at which point the nous will start the unceasing prayer of the heart) and become illuminated, allowing the person to become an orthodox theologian.

In this belief, the soul is created in the image of God. Since God is Trinitarian, Mankind is Nous, reason, both logos and dianoia, and Spirit. The same is held true of the soul (or heart): it has nous, word and spirit. To understand this better first an understanding of Saint Gregory Palamas's teaching that man is a representation of the trinitarian mystery should be addressed. This holds that God is not meant in the sense that the Trinity should be understood anthropomorphically, but man is to be understood in a triune way. Or, that the Trinitarian God is not to be interpreted from the point of view of individual man, but man is interpreted on the basis of the Trinitarian God. And this interpretation is revelatory not merely psychological and human. This means that it is only when a person is within the revelation, as all the saints lived, that he can grasp this understanding completely (see theoria). The second presupposition is that mankind has and is composed of nous, word and spirit like the trinitarian mode of being. Man's nous, word and spirit are not hypostases or individual existences or realities, but activities or energies of the soul—whereas in the case with God or the Persons of the Holy Trinity, each are indeed hypostases. So these three components of each individual man are 'inseparable from one another' but they do not have a personal character" when in speaking of the being or ontology that is mankind. The nous as the eye of the soul, which some Fathers also call the heart, is the centre of man and is where true (spiritual) knowledge is validated. This is seen as true knowledge which is "implanted in the nous as always co-existing with it".

== Early modern philosophy ==
The so-called "early modern" philosophers of western Europe in the 17th and 18th centuries established arguments which led to the establishment of modern science as a methodical approach to improve the welfare of humanity by learning to control nature. As such, speculation about metaphysics, which cannot be used for anything practical, and which can never be confirmed against the reality we experience, started to be deliberately avoided, especially according to the so-called "empiricist" arguments of philosophers such as Bacon, Hobbes, Locke and Hume. The Latin motto "nihil in intellectu nisi prius fuerit in sensu" (nothing in the intellect without first being in the senses) has been described as the "guiding principle of empiricism" in the Oxford Dictionary of Philosophy. (This was in fact an old Aristotelian doctrine, which they took up, but as discussed above Aristotelians still believed that the senses on their own were not enough to explain the mind.)

These philosophers explain the intellect as something developed from experience of sensations, being interpreted by the brain in a physical way, and nothing else, which means that absolute knowledge is impossible. For Bacon, Hobbes and Locke, who wrote in both English and Latin, "intellectus" was translated as "understanding". Far from seeing it as secure way to perceive the truth about reality, Bacon, for example, actually named the intellectus in his Novum Organum, and the proœmium to his Great Instauration, as a major source of wrong conclusions, because it is biased in many ways, for example towards over-generalizing. For this reason, modern science should be methodical, in order not to be misled by the weak human intellect. He felt that lesser known Greek philosophers such as Democritus "who did not suppose a mind or reason in the frame of things", have been arrogantly dismissed because of Aristotelianism leading to a situation in his time wherein "the search of the physical causes hath been neglected, and passed in silence". The intellect or understanding was the subject of Locke's Essay Concerning Human Understanding.

These philosophers also tended not to emphasize the distinction between reason and intellect, describing the peculiar universal or abstract definitions of human understanding as being man-made and resulting from reason itself. Hume even questioned the distinctness or peculiarity of human understanding and reason, compared to other types of associative or imaginative thinking found in some other animals. In modern science during this time, Newton is sometimes described as more empiricist compared to Leibniz.

On the other hand, into modern times some philosophers have continued to propose that the human mind has an in-born ("a priori") ability to know the truth conclusively, and these philosophers have needed to argue that the human mind has direct and intuitive ideas about nature, and this means it can not be limited entirely to what can be known from sense perception. Amongst the early modern philosophers, some such as Descartes, Spinoza, Leibniz, and Kant, tend to be distinguished from the empiricists as rationalists, and to some extent at least some of them are called idealists, and their writings on the intellect or understanding present various doubts about empiricism, and in some cases they argued for positions which appear more similar to those of medieval and classical philosophers.

The first in this series of modern rationalists, Descartes, is credited with defining a "mind-body problem" which is a major subject of discussion for university philosophy courses. According to the presentation his 2nd Meditation, the human mind and body are different in kind, and while Descartes agrees with Hobbes for example that the human body works like a clockwork mechanism, and its workings include memory and imagination, the real human is the thinking being, a soul, which is not part of that mechanism. Descartes explicitly refused to divide this soul into its traditional parts such as intellect and reason, saying that these things were indivisible aspects of the soul. Descartes was therefore a dualist, but very much in opposition to traditional Aristotelian dualism. In his 6th Meditation he deliberately uses traditional terms and states that his active faculty of giving ideas to his thought must be corporeal, because the things perceived are clearly external to his own thinking and corporeal, while his passive faculty must be incorporeal (unless God is deliberately deceiving us, and then in this case the active faculty would be from God). This is the opposite of the traditional explanation found for example in Alexander of Aphrodisias and discussed above, for whom the passive intellect is material, while the active intellect is not. One result is that in many Aristotelian conceptions of the nous, for example that of Thomas Aquinas, the senses are still a source of all the intellect's conceptions. However, with the strict separation of mind and body proposed by Descartes, it becomes possible to propose that there can be thought about objects never perceived with the body's senses, such as a thousand sided geometrical figure. Gassendi objected to this distinction between the imagination and the intellect in Descartes. Hobbes also objected, and according to his own philosophical approach asserted that the "triangle in the mind comes from the triangle we have seen" and "essence in so far as it is distinguished from existence is nothing else than a union of names by means of the verb is". Descartes, in his reply to this objection insisted that this traditional distinction between essence and existence is "known to all".

His contemporary Blaise Pascal, criticised him in similar words to those used by Plato's Socrates concerning Anaxagoras, discussed above, saying that "I cannot forgive Descartes; in all his philosophy, Descartes did his best to dispense with God. But Descartes could not avoid prodding God to set the world in motion with a snap of his lordly fingers; after that, he had no more use for God."

Descartes argued that when the intellect does a job of helping people interpret what they perceive, not with the help of an intellect which enters from outside, but because each human mind comes into being with innate God-given ideas, more similar then, to Plato's theory of anamnesis, only not requiring reincarnation. Apart from such examples as the geometrical definition of a triangle, another example is the idea of God, according to the 4th "Meditation", comes about because people make judgments about things which are not in the intellect or understanding. This is possible because the human will, being free, is not limited like the human intellect.

Spinoza, though considered a Cartesian and a rationalist, rejected Cartesian dualism and idealism. In his "pantheistic" approach, explained for example in his Ethics, God is the same as nature, the human intellect is just the same as the human will. The divine intellect of nature is quite different from human intellect, because it is finite, but Spinoza does accept that the human intellect is a part of the infinite divine intellect.

Leibniz, in comparison to the guiding principle of the empiricists described above, added some words nihil in intellectu nisi prius fuerit in sensu, nisi intellectus ipsi ("nothing in the intellect without first being in the senses" except the intellect itself). Despite being at the forefront of modern science, and modernist philosophy, in his writings he still referred to the active and passive intellect, a divine intellect, and the immortality of the active intellect.

Berkeley, partly in reaction to Locke, also attempted to reintroduce an "immaterialism" into early modern philosophy (later referred to as "subjective idealism" by others). He argued that individuals can only know sensations and ideas of objects, not abstractions such as "matter", and that ideas depend on perceiving minds for their very existence. This belief later became immortalized in the dictum, esse est percipi ("to be is to be perceived"). As in classical and medieval philosophy, Berkeley believed understanding had to be explained by divine intervention, and that all our ideas are put in our mind by God.

Hume accepted some of Berkeley's corrections of Locke, but in answer insisted, as had Bacon and Hobbes, that absolute knowledge is not possible, and that all attempts to show how it could be possible have logical problems. Hume's writings remain highly influential on all philosophy afterwards, and are for example considered by Kant to have shaken him from an intellectual slumber.

Kant, a turning point in modern philosophy, agreed with some classical philosophers and Leibniz that the intellect itself, although it needed sensory experience for understanding to begin, needs something else in order to make sense of the incoming sense information. In his formulation the intellect (Verstand) has a priori or innate principles which it has before thinking even starts. Kant represents the starting point of German idealism and a new phase of modernity, while empiricist philosophy has also continued beyond Hume to the present day.

== See also ==
- 'Aql
- Buddhi
- Cognitive psychology
- Common sense
- Gestalt psychology
- Noema
- Noogenic neurosis
- Noopolitik
- Noosphere
- Nootropic
- Noumenon
- Panpsychism
- Perceptual psychology
- Phenomenology
- Saṃjñā
- Technoetics
- Tripartite (theology)
