= Platonic epistemology =

Theory of knowledge by Plato

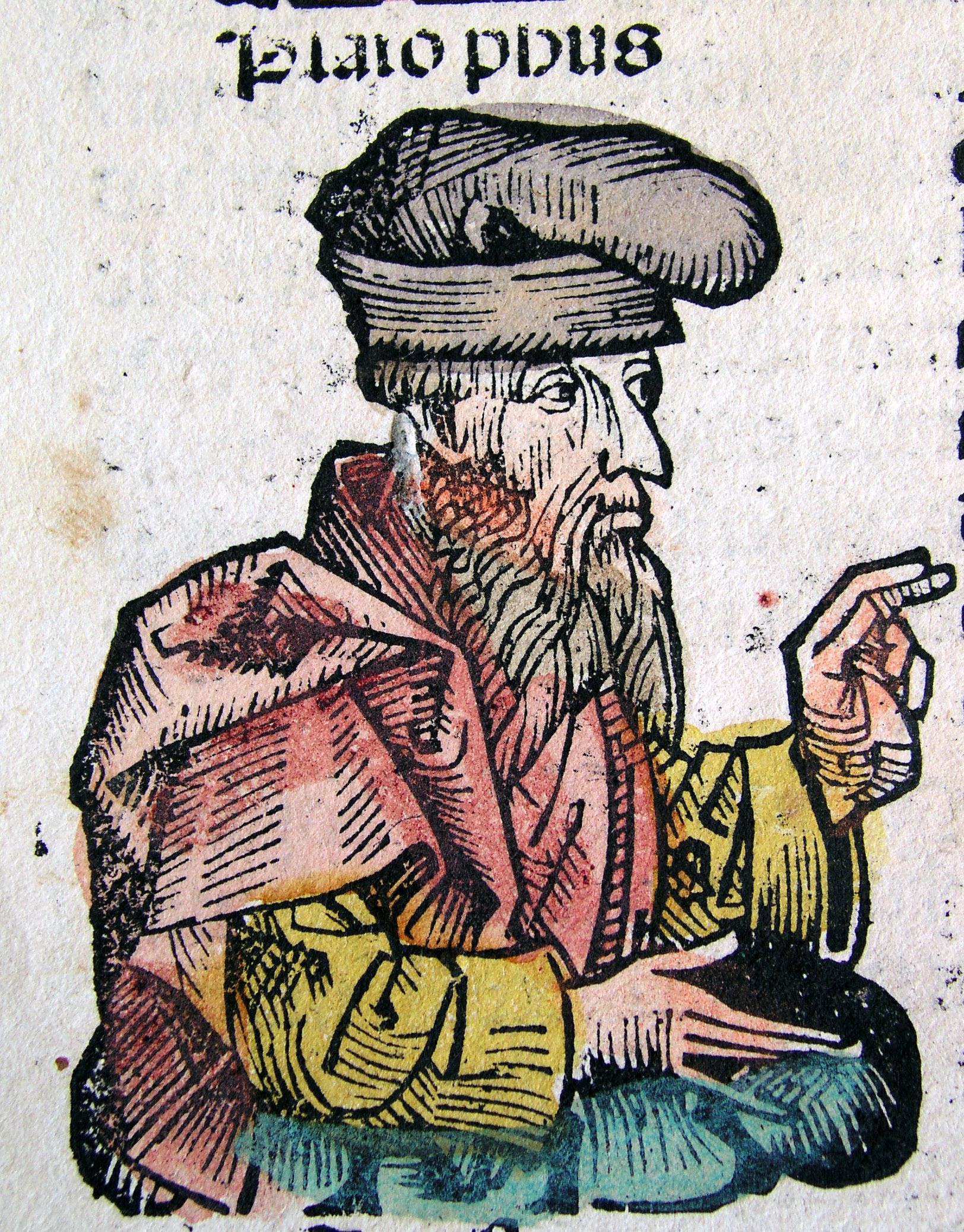
Plato in the Nuremberg Chronicle

In philosophy, Plato's epistemology is a theory of knowledge developed by the Greek philosopher Plato and his followers.

Platonic epistemology holds that knowledge of Platonic Ideas is innate, so that learning is the development of ideas buried deep in the soul, often under the midwife-like guidance of an interrogator. In several dialogues by Plato, the character Socrates presents the view that each soul existed before birth with the Form of the Good and a perfect knowledge of Ideas. Thus, when an Idea is "learned" it is actually just "recalled".

Plato drew a sharp distinction between knowledge, which is certain, and mere true opinion, which is not certain. Opinions derive from the shifting world of sensation; knowledge derives from the world of timeless Forms, or essences. In The Republic, these concepts were illustrated using the metaphor of the Sun, the analogy of the divided line, and the allegory of the cave.

== Platonic doctrine of recollection ==
The Platonic doctrine of recollection, or anamnesis is the view that we are born possessing all knowledge and our realization of that knowledge is contingent on our discovery of it. Whether the doctrine should be taken literally or not is a subject of debate. The soul is trapped in the body. The soul was once directly acquainted with the Forms, but it is now embodied. It once knew all of the Forms, but forgot them. Recollection is the process of bringing to our attention this knowledge that we have forgotten. This doctrine implies that nothing is ever learned, it is simply recalled or remembered. In short it says that all that we know already comes pre-loaded on birth and our senses enable us to identify and recognize the stratified information in our mind. Recollection involves, on the one hand, overcoming the deceptions and distractions of the body, but, on the other hand, productively using the body's deceptions to occasion or trigger the episodes of recollection. The main texts that develop the theory of recollection are the Phaedo and Meno, although the theory also plays an important role in the Phaedrus.

== Metaphor of the Sun ==
In the Republic (VI 507b–509c), Plato's character, Socrates, uses the Sun as a metaphor for the source of "intellectual illumination", which he held to be The Form of the Good. The metaphor is about the nature of ultimate reality and how we come to know it. It starts with the eye, which Socrates says is unusual among the sense organs in that it needs a medium, namely light, in order to operate. The strongest and best source of light is the Sun; with it, we can discern objects clearly. Analogously, for intelligible objects The Form of the Good is necessary in order to understand any particular thing. Thus, if we attempt to understand why things are as they are, and what general categories can be used to understand various particulars around us, without reference to any forms (universals) we will fail completely. In contrast, "the domain where truth and reality shine resplendent" is none other than Plato's world of forms, illuminated by the highest of the Forms, that of the Good.

== The divided line ==
In the sixth book of the Republic, the divided line has two parts that represent the intelligible world and the smaller visible world. Each of those two parts is divided, the segments within the intelligible world represent higher and lower forms and the segments within the visible world represent ordinary visible objects and their shadows, reflections, and other representations. The line segments are unequal and their lengths represent "their comparative clearness and obscurity" and their comparative "reality and truth", as well as whether we have knowledge or instead mere opinion of the objects.

== Allegory of the cave ==
In his best-known dialogue, The Republic, Plato drew an analogy between human sensation and the shadows that pass along the wall of a cave - an allegory known as Plato's allegory of the cave.

== Charioteer myth ==
Along with these other allegories, Plato's charioteer myth in the Phaedrus (245c–257b) certainly also deserves mention. The ascent of the mind to celestial and trans-celestial realms is likened to a charioteer and a chariot drawn by two winged horses, one dark and one white. Figuratively represented is the famous Platonic tripartite model of the soul: the charioteer represents reason, or intellect, the dark horse appetitive passions, and the white horse irascible nature. Only by taming and controlling the two horses can the charioteer ascend to the heavens and enjoy a banquet of divine knowledge. Key epistemological features of the charioteer myth are (1) an emphasis, as with the cave allegory, upon true knowledge as ascent, (2) and the need to tame one's passionate nature to obtain true knowledge.

== An example: love and wisdom ==
A good example of how Plato presents the acquiring of knowledge is contained in the Ladder of Love. In the Symposium (210a–211b), Plato's Socrates cites the priestess Diotima as defining a "lover" as someone who loves and love as a desire for something that one does not have. According to this ladder model of love, a lover progresses from rung to rung from the basest love to the pure form of love as follows:

1. A beautiful body – The lover begins here at the most obvious form of love.
2. All beautiful bodies – If the lover examines his love and does some investigating, he/she will find that the beauty contained in this beautiful body is not original, that it is shared by every beautiful body.
3. Beautiful souls – After most likely attempting to have every beautiful body, the lover should realize that if a single love does not satisfy, there is no reason to think that many ones will satisfy. Thus, the "lover of every body" must, in the words of Plato, "bring his passion for the one into due proportion by deeming it of little or of no importance". Instead, the passion is transferred to a more appropriate object: the soul.
4. The beauty of laws and institutions – The next logical step is for the lover to love all beautiful souls and then to transfer that love to that which is responsible for their existence: a moderate, harmonious and just social order.
5. The beauty of knowledge – Once proceeding down this path, the lover will naturally long for that which produces and makes intelligible good social institutions: knowledge.
6. Beauty itself – This is the Form of Beauty. It is not a particular thing that is beautiful, but is instead the essence of beauty. Plato describes this level of love as a "wondrous vision", an "everlasting loveliness which neither comes nor ages, which neither flowers nor fades." It is eternal and isn't "anything that is of the flesh" nor "words" nor "knowledge" but consists "of itself and by itself in an eternal oneness, while every lovely thing partakes of it".

Knowledge concerning other things is similarly gained by progressing from a base reality (or shadow) of the thing sought (red, tall, thin, keen, etc.) to the eventual form of the thing sought, or the thing sought itself. Such steps follow the same pattern as Plato's metaphor of the sun, his allegory of the cave and his divided line; progress brings one closer and closer to reality as each step explains the relative reality of the past.
