= The Sovereignty of Good =

1970 book by Iris Murdoch

- First English edition cover
- Author: Iris Murdoch
- Language: English
- Series: Studies in Ethics and the Philosophy of Religion
- Subject: Ethics
- Publisher: Routledge & Kegan Paul
- Publication date: 1970
- Publication place: United Kingdom
- Media type: Print
- Pages: 106
- ISBN: 0710068638

The Sovereignty of Good is a book of moral philosophy by Iris Murdoch. First published in 1970, it comprises three previously published papers, all of which were originally delivered as lectures. Murdoch argued against the prevailing consensus in moral philosophy, proposing instead a Platonist approach. The Sovereignty of Good is Murdoch's best-known philosophy book.

== Publishing history ==
The philosopher D. Z. Phillips commissioned The Sovereignty of Good from Iris Murdoch as a contribution to Routledge & Kegan Paul's series "Studies in Ethics and the Philosophy of Religion", of which Phillips was general editor. The book comprises three previously published papers, all of which were originally delivered as lectures.

The first essay, entitled "The idea of perfection", originated as Murdoch's 1962 Ballard Matthews Lecture in the University College of North Wales. It was published in The Yale Review in April 1964. "On 'God' and 'Good' ", the second essay, was Murdoch's contribution to the August 1966 meeting of the Study Group on Foundations of Cultural Unity at Bowdoin College. It was published in 1969 in The Anatomy of Knowledge, a collection of papers presented at the Study Group's 1965 and 1966 meetings. The book's final essay is "The sovereignty of good over other concepts", which was the Leslie Stephen Lecture delivered in the University of Cambridge on 14 November 1967. The lecture was published as a 37-page pamphlet in the same year by Cambridge University Press.

The first edition of The Sovereignty of Good was in hardcover, published in London in 1970 by Routledge. The first English paperback edition came out in 1971. Schocken Books published it in the United States, where the hardcover and paperback editions were published simultaneously in 1971. Routledge reprinted the paperback edition in 1974 and 1980. In 2001 Routledge reissued The Sovereignty of Good in both England and the United States as part of its "Routledge Classics" series. In 2013 the book appeared as a "Routledge Great Minds" edition with a foreword by Mary Midgley.

== Historical context ==
The dominant schools of philosophy at the time when The Sovereignty of Good and its component essays appeared were existentialism in Europe and analytic philosophy in the English-speaking world. Iris Murdoch's moral philosophy argues against what she takes to be the central ideas of both these schools.

Her first book, Sartre: Romantic Rationalist, had been published in 1953. Murdoch met Jean-Paul Sartre after hearing him lecture in Brussels in 1945 when she was working for UNRRA, and was impressed with his existentialist philosophy at the time, although she later came to reject what she called his "Luciferian" view of a morality based on freedom and individual will rather than love and goodness.

The prevailing view among analytic philosophers at the time was that, as with physical science, statements about reality must be publicly verifiable as true or false, leading to the conclusion that the "states and activities of the soul in all their variety must be revealed in observed behavior" in order to be "classed as objective realities". Murdoch, on the other hand, disagreed with what she saw as analytic philosophy's consequent "rejection of the inner life".

Iris Murdoch's main influence in The Sovereignty of Good is Plato, at a time when, as her biographer Peter J. Conradi notes, to be "a Platonist in morals seemed as bizarre as declaring oneself a Jacobite in politics". Simone Weil, whose Notebooks Murdoch had reviewed in 1956, was an important influence on Murdoch's reading of Plato and on her philosophy generally. Weil's concept of "attention" to reality, including both other people and a transcendent Good, provided Murdoch with an alternative to the conventional view of an autonomous free agent's actions as the basis of morality.

The book is dedicated to Stuart Hampshire, Murdoch's fellow philosopher and former colleague at the University of Oxford, where she taught from 1948 to 1963. Hampshire's view of man as essentially "an object moving among other objects in a continual flow of intention into action", is also the main target of her argument in "The idea of perfection", the book's first essay.

== Structure and arguments ==
The book's three essays were not originally intended to be published as a unit and do not depend on or refer to each other. They are united in their aim of demonstrating the inadequacies of the prevailing philosophical account of morality and replacing it with a new conception that includes a "moral reality external to ourselves", but each paper takes a different approach to this project. In "The idea of perfection", Murdoch describes an "ordinary and everyday" example of inner moral activity that cannot be accounted for within the current paradigm, and uses it to argue for a philosophical conception of morality that will allow us to say "what we are irresistibly inclined to say" about it. In "On 'God' and 'Good' ", acknowledging the influence of Simone Weil, she explores the Christian practice of prayer and its possible application to the Platonic concept of the Good. In "The sovereignty of good over other concepts" she uses Platonic imagery in arguing that art and intellectual pursuits can serve as training in the virtues.

=== The idea of perfection ===
Murdoch's argument in this paper progresses through three stages. She first describes what she takes to be the accepted philosophical view of man as a moral agent, referring mainly to Stuart Hampshire's Disposition and Memory and Thought and Action. She concludes that the contemporary paradigm of "man" in both analytic and continental philosophy (which she characterizes as Kantian and surrealistic existentialism respectively) is "behaviourist, existentialist, and utilitarian". The behaviourism relates to this view's "connection of the meaning and being of action with the publicly observable", existentialism to its "elimination of the substantial self and its emphasis on the solitary omnipotent will", and utilitarianism to its "assumption that morality is and can only be concerned with public acts".

After remarking that she objects to this characterization on empirical, philosophical and moral grounds, she goes on to examine the philosophical basis for the dominant view. She locates the source of its fundamental claim that "mental concepts must be analyzed genetically and so the inner must be thought of a parasitic upon the outer", in an argument within the British empiricist tradition about the ontological status of private sense-data. She credits Wittgenstein with having effectively put an end to the question by showing that "no sense can be attached to the idea of an 'inner object' ", but notes that he did not draw any "moral or psychological" conclusions based on this observation. Others, however, including Hampshire, Ryle, Hare, and Ayer, have illegitimately extended Wittgenstein's argument into these areas.

Murdoch then introduces, as an example of moral activity that has no outward manifestation, the changing attitude of a mother (M) toward her daughter-in-law (D). M at first dislikes D, but gives no outward hint of this and "behaves beautifully" toward her. Over the course of time, however, "by giving careful and just attention" to D, M comes to see her as "not vulgar but refreshingly simple, not undignified but spontaneous .... and so on". Murdoch claims that while reflecting on D in this way, M has been engaging in moral activity, but the problem is that this cannot be said within the accepted paradigm.

In the second stage of the argument Murdoch rejects the underlying conception of reality that excludes everything that is not publicly observable, and proposes a different one. She argues that philosophy's attachment to observability as a criterion of reality stems from its adoption of an "uncriticized conception of science". The result is that philosophy is incapable of accounting for the living person who changes inwardly over time. Morality does not fit into the world describable by science, so philosophy needs to liberate itself from the limits of science. Murdoch argues that "the central concept of morality is 'the individual' thought of as knowable by love", and connects this concept with the idea of perfection since "morality is connected with change and progress" toward "an ideal limit".

In the third stage Murdoch applies her conception of morality to the idea of freedom. Both analytic and continental existentialist moral philosophy located individual freedom in the moment of choice, when a person decides to act in the world. According to Murdoch's view of morality as loving attention to reality, as displayed by M toward D, freedom comes from increasing knowledge of reality, which allows the individual to see clearly. With complete clarity of vision, one would not be distracted by one's own prejudices and biases and would be able to act simply in accord with reality instead of choosing more or less blindly. She notes that the "notion of will as obedience to reality, an obedience which ideally teaches a position where there is no choice" is one which is familiar to artists, and claims that her conception of moral psychology is uniquely able to accommodate both art and morals as compatible activities.

=== On "God" and "Good" ===
Murdoch begins by stating the need for a moral philosophy that, among other requirements, takes seriously the views of Freud and Marx, and gives its central place to "the concept of love". She characterizes the commonly accepted analytic and existential philosophical views of moral psychology as "unambitious and optimistic" compared to Christian theology with its representation of "goodness as almost impossibly difficult, and sin as almost insuperable and certainly a universal condition". She notes that philosophers have tried to ignore or deny Freud's pessimistic, but in her view realistic, account of "the psyche as an egocentric system of quasi-mechanical energy" with a "deep tissue of ambivalent motive" in which "fantasy is a stronger force than reason". She sees the "fat relentless ego" as the secular analogue of original sin, and insists that moral philosophy's task should be "the discussion of this ego and of the techniques (if any) for its defeat".

Murdoch suggests the religious practice of prayer as an example of a technique for turning one's attention away from one's own egocentric desires and concerns, and goes on to explore its possible adaptation to a secular world. She defines prayer as "an attention to God which is a form of love", and God as "a single perfect non-representable and necessarily real object of attention". She examines each of these attributes (in the following order: object of attention, unitary, transcendent, perfect, necessary, and real) with the aim of comprehending a single non-religious concept of Good to which they could all be attributed. She notes that for a religious person sincere attention to God can give rise to grace, a form of energy that inspires the person to be virtuous. She connects this with the mundane human experiences of falling in love and of focussing attention on "things which are valuable". She uses the apparent interdependence of the virtues, which have to be described in terms of each other, to show a form of unity of good. Transcendence is analyzed in terms of realism, in the sense of the attention being directed away from one's egocentric fantasies, and with reference to the experience of beauty. Perfection is seen as necessarily implied by our sense that there are degrees of goodness, so that we can always conceive of better, though indefinable, goodness beyond what we can experience for ourselves. Finally, the attributes of necessity and reality are again connected with realism, in the sense of "the ability to see things as they are". In this case the activity of the good artist who is able to "silence and dispel self, to contemplate and delineate nature with a clear eye" is seen as paradigmatic.

Having set up the concept of Good as analogous to God, Murdoch returns to her earlier question whether there can be a secular substitute for prayer. She says that Good in itself is not visible but agrees with Plato's characterization of the Good (similarly to the Sun in the Allegory of the Cave) as the source of light by which reality can be seen. Contemplation of the Good directly may not be possible but "Good is the focus of attention when an intent to be virtuous co-exists... with some unclarity of vision".

=== The sovereignty of good over other concepts ===
Murdoch begins by placing her argument within the philosophical tradition of "image-play", in which metaphorical concepts such as vision and movement are used in an attempt to answer philosophical questions. In this paper the question is how human beings can become morally better, given what is known about human nature. Underlying her arguments are the assumptions that humans are "naturally selfish", and that there is "no external point" to human life. She notes that, for believers, prayer can help in the attainment of a more virtuous character and can provide energy for good action. She sees this as supporting the claim that virtue is encouraged by "anything that alters consciousness in the direction of unselfishness, objectivity and realism".

Murdoch describes a "progressive education in the virtues" which involves engaging in practices that turn our attention away from ourselves toward valuable objects in the real world. Citing Plato's Phaedrus, she identifies the experience of beauty as the most accessible and the easiest to understand. She attributes the "unselfing" power of beauty both to nature and to art. Also following Plato, she locates the next and more difficult practice in intellectual disciplines. She uses the example of learning a foreign language as the occasion to practice virtues such as honesty and humility while increasing one's knowledge of "an authoritative structure which commands my respect". She says that the same quality of outward objective attention to the particular is needed for developing and practicing virtues in ordinary human relations.

Murdoch argues that Plato's concept of the Good applies to and unifies all these ways of learning and practicing the virtues. In her discussion of the concept, she refers to three sections from Plato's Republic: the Analogy of the Sun, the Analogy of the Divided Line, and the Allegory of the Cave. The concept of Good, Murdoch says, involves perfection, hierarchy, and transcendence, and is both unifying and indefinable. She suggests that "a sort of contemplation of the Good" in the sense of "a turning away from the particular" is possible and "may be the thing that helps most when difficulties seem insoluble". However, this practice is difficult and carries with it the danger that the object of attention might revert to the self.

== Reception ==
Iris Murdoch had stopped teaching philosophy in Oxford several years before the publication of The Sovereignty of Good, and was well known as a novelist. The Sovereignty of Good was reviewed in newspapers and magazines as well as in academic journals. In the year-end "Books of the Year" feature in The Times, the journalist and playwright Dennis Potter called it "the most stimulating new book on any subject" he had read in 1970, citing its ability to "give clear and confident shape to those thoughts and sympathies which in ourselves had only been vague or evasive or even shamefaced".

The philosopher Renford Bambrough's review was originally published in The Spectator, appearing in the journal Philosophy in 1985 when The Sovereignty of Good was reissued in a new paperback edition. He called it a "persuasive book" which combined the talents of the artist and the philosopher in an attack on the current state of moral philosophy. He commended the final essay for its "valuable transposition into a more accessible medium of some of the central Platonic insights", while noting that some aspects of Murdoch's interpretation of Plato could be questioned. In Philosophy in 1972, H.O. Mounce agreed with Murdoch's criticisms of the prevailing views in moral philosophy at the time, but had reservations about her use of Simone Weil's concept of attention and her view of the connection between goodness and knowledge. He recommended the book as "one of the most interesting books on ethics to have appeared for a number of years", mainly because of its "freshness".

In Essays in Criticism, a journal of literary criticism, the philosopher James Griffin dealt primarily with Murdoch's account of the relation between art and moral philosophy. He took issue with Murdoch's description of contemporary moral philosophy as claiming to be value neutral, saying that while this view had been influential in the recent past, it was "now rarely held in anything like such a pure form". He also disagreed with her identification of the ego as the chief enemy in both moral life and art, arguing that the description of good art as "piercing the veil" cast by the ego failed to account for non-representational art, and that there are sources of obscuration other than the ego.

The Heythrop Journal's reviewer found the book "truly spiritual reading", noting a similarity between her account of self-transcendence and St. Augustine's view of the soul. Also in The Heythrop Journal, Peter Hebblethwaite compared Murdoch with Leszek Kołakowski as a philosopher paradoxically "attempting to revitalize theological concepts" at a time when some theologians were trying to avoid the use of overtly theological language. Colin Gunton's review in Religious Studies was generally positive but found her account of the Good unsatisfactory and reminiscent of "the broken-backed versions of the traditional theistic proofs that sometimes appear in modern natural theology".

== Legacy ==
The Sovereignty of Good is Murdoch's best known book of philosophy. In 1998 Mary Midgley called it "one of the very few modern books of philosophy which people outside academic philosophy find really helpful", a distinction it shares with C. S. Lewis's The Abolition of Man. Midgley identifies a "superstitious belief" in "a single, vast, infallible system called science which completely explains human existence" as fundamental to the philosophical views which Murdoch "debunked". Writing in The Guardian in 2012, Andrew Brown described Murdoch as providing "reasons, and ways of thinking that will supply further reasons", that scientism is mistaken.

The Sovereignty of Good's influence on academic philosophy began to be felt in the late 1970s with the work of John McDowell. Among others who have cited Murdoch as an influence are Cora Diamond, Hilary Putnam, Charles Taylor, Bernard Williams and Susan Wolf.
