= Anamnesis (philosophy) =

Concept in Plato's epistemological and psychological theory

In Plato's theory of epistemology, anamnesis (/ˌænæmˈniːsɪs/; Ancient Greek: ἀνάμνησις, meaning "memory") refers to the recollection of innate knowledge acquired before birth. The concept posits the claim that learning involves the act of rediscovering knowledge from within oneself. This stands in stark contrast to the opposing doctrine known as empiricism, which posits that all knowledge is derived from experience and sensory perception. Plato develops the theory of anamnesis in his Socratic dialogues: Meno, Phaedo, and Phaedrus.

== Meno ==
In Meno, Plato's character (and old teacher) Socrates is challenged by Meno to explain how someone could find out what the nature of virtue is if they did not already know anything about it. In other words, one who knows none of the attributes, properties, and/or other descriptive markers of any kind that help signify what something is (physical or otherwise) will not recognize it even after coming across it. Therefore, if the converse is true, and one knows the attributes, properties and/or other descriptive markers of this thing, one should not need to seek it out at all. The conclusion is that in either instance, there is no point trying to gain that "something"; in the case of Plato's aforementioned work, there is no point in seeking knowledge.

Socrates' response is to develop his theory of anamnesis and to suggest that the soul is immortal, and repeatedly incarnated; knowledge is in the soul from eternity (86b), but each time the soul is incarnated its knowledge is forgotten in the trauma of birth. What one perceives to be learning, then, is the recovery of what one has forgotten. (Once it has been brought back it is true belief, to be turned into genuine knowledge by understanding.) Socrates (and Plato) thus sees himself not as a teacher but as a midwife, aiding with the birth of knowledge that was already there in the student.

The theory is illustrated by Socrates asking a slave boy questions about geometry. At first, the boy gives the wrong answer; when that is pointed out to him, he is puzzled, but by asking questions, Socrates helps him to reach the correct answer. That is intended to show that since the boy was not told the answer, he reached the truth by only recollecting what he had once known but later forgotten.

== Phaedo ==
In Phaedo, Plato develops his theory of anamnesis, in part by combining it with his theory of forms. Firstly, he elaborates how anamnesis can be achieved: whereas in Meno, nothing more than Socrates' method of questioning is offered, in Phaedo, Plato presents a way of living that would enable one to overcome the misleading nature of the body through katharsis (Ancient Greek: κάθαρσις, lit. 'cleansing' or 'purification', i.e., from guilt or defilement). The body and its senses are the source of error; knowledge cannot be regained except through the use of reason, and contemplating things with the soul (noesis). While the body's perceptual faculties are deceptive, Plato also argues that the falsehoods that they communicate to the soul can be used to trigger or prompt recollection. Secondly, Plato clarifies that genuine knowledge, as opposed to mere true belief (doxa), is distinguished by its content. One can know only eternal truths since they are the only truths that possibly were in the soul from eternity. It may be very useful to have a true belief about, say, the best way to get from London to Oxford, but such a belief does not qualify as knowledge; it is not possible for the soul to possess such factually contingent propositions for all eternity.

== Neoplatonism ==
For later interpreters of Plato, the concept of anamnesis became less epistemic and more ontological. Plotinus himself did not posit recollection in the strict sense of the term because all knowledge of universally important ideas (logos) came from a source outside of time (Dyad or the divine nous) and was accessible, using contemplation, to the soul as part of noesis. They were more objects of experience, of inner knowledge or insight, than of recollection. However, in Neoplatonism, the theory of anamnesis became part of the mythology of the descent of the soul.

Porphyry's short work On the Cave of the Nymphs in the Odyssey (ostensibly a commentary on the brief passage in Odyssey XIII) elucidated that notion, as did Macrobius's much longer Commentary on the Dream of Scipio. The idea of psychic memory was used by Neoplatonists to demonstrate the celestial and immaterial origins of the soul and to explain how memories of the world-soul could be recalled by everyday human beings. As such, psychic recollection was intrinsically connected to the Platonic conception of the soul. Since the contents of individual "material" or physical memories were trivial, only the universal recollection of Forms, or divine objects, drew one closer to the immortal source of being.

Anamnesis is the closest that human minds can come to experiencing the freedom of the soul before it is encumbered by matter. The incarnation process is described in Neoplatonism as a trauma that causes the soul to forget its experiences (and often its divine origins). The storyteller's voice is concealed by John and Plato in order to pursue their anamnetic efforts and to encourage the following generations to be not only readers but also partakers in their original discussions on the soul. Gratitude, as an example of divine salvation, was expressed by offering to God the first fruits of the harvest which maintains an identity with those who performed these actions in the past and therefore actualising them in the present.

== See also ==
- Hypomnema
