= Dianoia =

Human cognitive faculty

In Platonism, dianoia (Greek: διάνοια) is the human cognitive faculty associated with the CD portion of the analogy of the divided line and related to discursive thinking about mathematical and technical subjects. It stands in contrast to the immediate, cognitive process of intuitive apprehension or noesis.

In Aristotle, dianoia is subdivided into theoretical knowledge (technē) and practical knowledge (phronēsis).

== See also ==
- Epistemology
- Theory of Forms
