= Phaneron =

Subject matter of phenomenology

The phaneron (From Ancient Greek: φανερός, romanized: phaneros, meaning 'visible, manifest') is the subject matter of phenomenology, or of what Charles Sanders Peirce later called phaneroscopy. The term, which was introduced in 1905, is similar to the concept of the "phenomenon" in the way it meant "whatever is present at any time to the mind in any way". It is the total of all that the mind perceives and knows, whether it corresponds to reality or not.

== Concept ==
According to Peirce: "By the phaneron I mean the collective total of all that is in any way or in any sense present to the mind, quite regardless of whether it corresponds to any real thing or not. If you ask present when, and to whose mind, I reply that I leave these questions unanswered, never having entertained a doubt that those features of the phaneron that I have found in my mind are present at all times and to all minds. So far as I have developed this science of phaneroscopy, it is occupied with the formal elements of the phaneron."

Insights into the nature of the phaneron may be demonstrated in Peirce's argument that the cosmos consists of the complete phaneron and it has indecomposable elements. There is also the case of Peirce's understanding that external reality cannot be considered a phaneron since it is not totally open to observation and that there are always aspects to reality that are known during observation.

In his writings, Peirce characterized phaneron in various ways and these are motivated by four different concerns. The first arises out of the thinker's conception of what phenomenology is, which is a study of the possibilities of consciousness. This underpins one of his characterizations of the phaneron as whatever is before the mind or whatever can or could be before the mind. Another concern stems from Peirce's belief that we can only study our own consciousness, so aside from the previous characterization, he also referred to phaneron as whatever is before the reader's mind. The third concern pertains to what constitutes that which comes before the mind, such as the items of consciousness. Finally, Peirce described the phaneron as the totality or the unity of consciousness, maintaining that "the collective total of all that is in any sense present to the mind, quite regardless of whether it corresponds to any real thing or not".
