= Analogy of the divided line =

Platonic philosophical analogy

The analogy of the divided line (Ancient Greek: γραμμὴ δίχα τετμημένη, romanized: grammē dicha tetmēmenē) is presented by the Greek philosopher Plato in the Republic (509d–511e). It is written as a dialogue between Glaucon and Socrates, in which the latter further elaborates upon the immediately preceding analogy of the Sun at the former's request. Socrates asks Glaucon not only to envision this unequally bisected line but to imagine further bisecting each of the two segments. Socrates explains that the four resulting segments represent four separate 'affections' (παθήματα) of the psyche. The lower two sections are said to represent the visible while the higher two are said to represent the intelligible. These affections are described in succession as corresponding to increasing levels of reality and truth from conjecture (εἰκασία) to belief (πίστις) to thought (διάνοια) and finally to understanding (νόησις). Furthermore, this analogy not only elaborates a theory of the psyche but also presents metaphysical and epistemological views.

== Description ==
In The Republic (509d–510a), Socrates describes the divided line to Glaucon this way:

Now take a line which has been cut into two unequal parts, and divide each of them again in the same proportion, and suppose the two main divisions to answer, one to the visible and the other to the intelligible, and then compare the subdivisions in respect of their clearness and want of clearness, and you will find that the first section in the sphere of the visible consists of images. And by images I mean, in the first place, shadows, and in the second place, reflections in water and in solid, smooth and polished bodies and the like: Do you understand?

Yes, I understand.

Imagine, now, the other section, of which this is only the resemblance, to include the animals which we see, and everything that grows or is made.

The Divided Line – (AC) is generally taken as representing the visible world and (CE) as representing the intelligible world.

== The visible world ==
Thus AB represents shadows and reflections of physical things, and BC the physical things themselves. These correspond to two kinds of knowledge, the illusion (eikasía) of our ordinary, everyday experience, and belief (πίστις pistis) about discrete physical objects which cast their shadows. In the Timaeus, the category of illusion includes all the "opinions of which the minds of ordinary people are full," while the natural sciences are included in the category of belief.

The term eikasía (Ancient Greek: εἰκασία), meaning conjecture in Greek, was used by Plato to refer to a human way of dealing with appearances. Particularly, it is identified as the lower subsection of the visible segment and represents images, which Plato described as "first shadows, then reflections in water and in all compacted, smooth, and shiny materials". According to the philosopher, eikasia and pistis add up to doxa, which is concerned with genesis (becoming).

Eikasia has several interpretations. For instance, it is the inability to perceive whether a perception is an image of something else. It therefore prevents us from perceiving that a dream or memory or a reflection in a mirror is not reality as such. Another variation posited by scholars such Yancey Dominick, explains that it is a way of understanding the originals that generate the objects that are considered as eikasia. This allows one to distinguish the image from reality such as the way one can avoid mistaking a reflection of a tree in a puddle for a tree.

== The intelligible world ==
According to some translations, the segment CE, representing the intelligible world, is divided into the same ratio as AC, giving the subdivisions CD and DE (it can be readily verified that CD must have the same length as BC):

There are two subdivisions, in the lower of which the soul uses the figures given by the former division as images; the enquiry can only be hypothetical, and instead of going upwards to a principle descends to the other end; in the higher of the two, the soul passes out of hypotheses, and goes up to a principle which is above hypotheses, making no use of images as in the former case, but proceeding only in and through the ideas themselves (510b).

Plato describes CD, the "lower" of these, as involving mathematical reasoning (διάνοια dianoia), where abstract mathematical objects such as geometric lines are discussed. Such objects are outside the physical world (and are not to be confused with the drawings of those lines, which fall within the physical world BC). However, they are less important to Plato than the subjects of philosophical understanding (νόησις noesis), the "higher" of these two subdivisions (DE):

And when I speak of the other division of the intelligible, you will understand me to speak of that other sort of knowledge which reason herself attains by the power of dialectic, using the hypotheses not as first principles, but only as hypotheses – that is to say, as steps and points of departure into a world which is above hypotheses, in order that she may soar beyond them to the first principle of the whole (511b).

Plato here is using the familiar relationship between ordinary objects and their shadows or reflections in order to illustrate the relationship between the physical world as a whole and the world of Ideas (Forms) as a whole. The former is made up of a series of passing reflections of the latter, which is eternal, more real and "true." Moreover, the knowledge that we have of the Ideas – when indeed we do have it – is of a higher order than knowledge of the mere physical world. In particular, knowledge of the forms leads to a knowledge of the Idea (Form) of the Good.

== Tabular summary of the divided line ==
Segment	Correlation	Affection of the psyche	Type of object	Method of the psyche or eye	Relative truth and reality
DE	Noesis (νόησις)	Knowledge (Understanding): understanding of only the Intelligible (νοητόν)	Only Ideas, which are all given existence and truth by the Good itself (τὸ αὐτὸ ἀγαθόν)	The Psyche examines all hypotheses by the Dialectic making no use of likenesses, always moving towards a First Principle	Highest
CD	Dianoia (διάνοια)	Knowledge (Thought): thought that recognizes but is not only of the Intelligible	Some Ideas, specifically those of Geometry and Number	The Psyche assumes hypotheses while making use of likenesses, always moving towards final conclusions	High
BC	Pistis (πίστις)	Opinion (Belief): belief concerning visible things	Visible things (ὁρατά)	The eye makes probable predictions upon observing visible things	Low
AB	Eikasia (εἰκασία)	Opinion (Imagination): conjectures concerning likenesses	Likenesses of visible things (εἰκόνες)	The eye makes guesses upon observing likenesses of visible things	Lowest

== Metaphysical importance ==
The analogy of the divided line is the cornerstone of Plato's metaphysical framework. This structure illustrates the grand picture of Plato's metaphysics, epistemology, and ethics, all in one. It is not enough for the philosopher to understand the Ideas (Forms), he must also understand the relation of Ideas to all four levels of the structure to be able to know anything at all. In the Republic, the philosopher must understand the Idea of Justice to live a just life or to organize and govern a just state.

The lowest level, which represents "the world of becoming and passing away" (Republic, 508d), is the metaphysical model for a Heraclitean philosophy of constant flux and for Protagorean philosophy of appearance and opinion. The second level, a world of fixed physical objects, also became Aristotle's metaphysical model. The third level might be a Pythagorean level of mathematics. The fourth level is Plato's ideal Parmenidean reality, the world of highest level Ideas.

== Epistemological meaning ==
Plato holds a very strict notion of knowledge. For example, he does not accept expertise about a subject, nor direct perception (see Theaetetus), nor true belief about the physical world (the Meno) as knowledge. It is not enough for the philosopher to understand the Ideas (Forms), he must also understand the relation of Ideas to all four levels of the structure to be able to know anything at all. For this reason, in most of the earlier Socratic dialogues, Socrates denies knowledge both to himself and others.

For the first level, "the world of becoming and passing away," Plato expressly denies the possibility of knowledge. Constant change never stays the same, therefore, properties of objects must refer to different Ideas at different times. Note that for knowledge to be possible, which Plato believed, the other three levels must be unchanging. The third and fourth level, mathematics and Ideas, are already eternal and unchanging. However, to ensure that the second level, the objective, physical world, is also unchanging, Plato, in the Republic, Book 4 introduces empirically derived axiomatic restrictions that prohibit both motion and shifting perspectives.

== See also ==
- Allegory of the Cave
- Allegorical interpretations of Plato
- Nous
- Self-similarity
