= Allegory of the cave =

Allegory by Plato

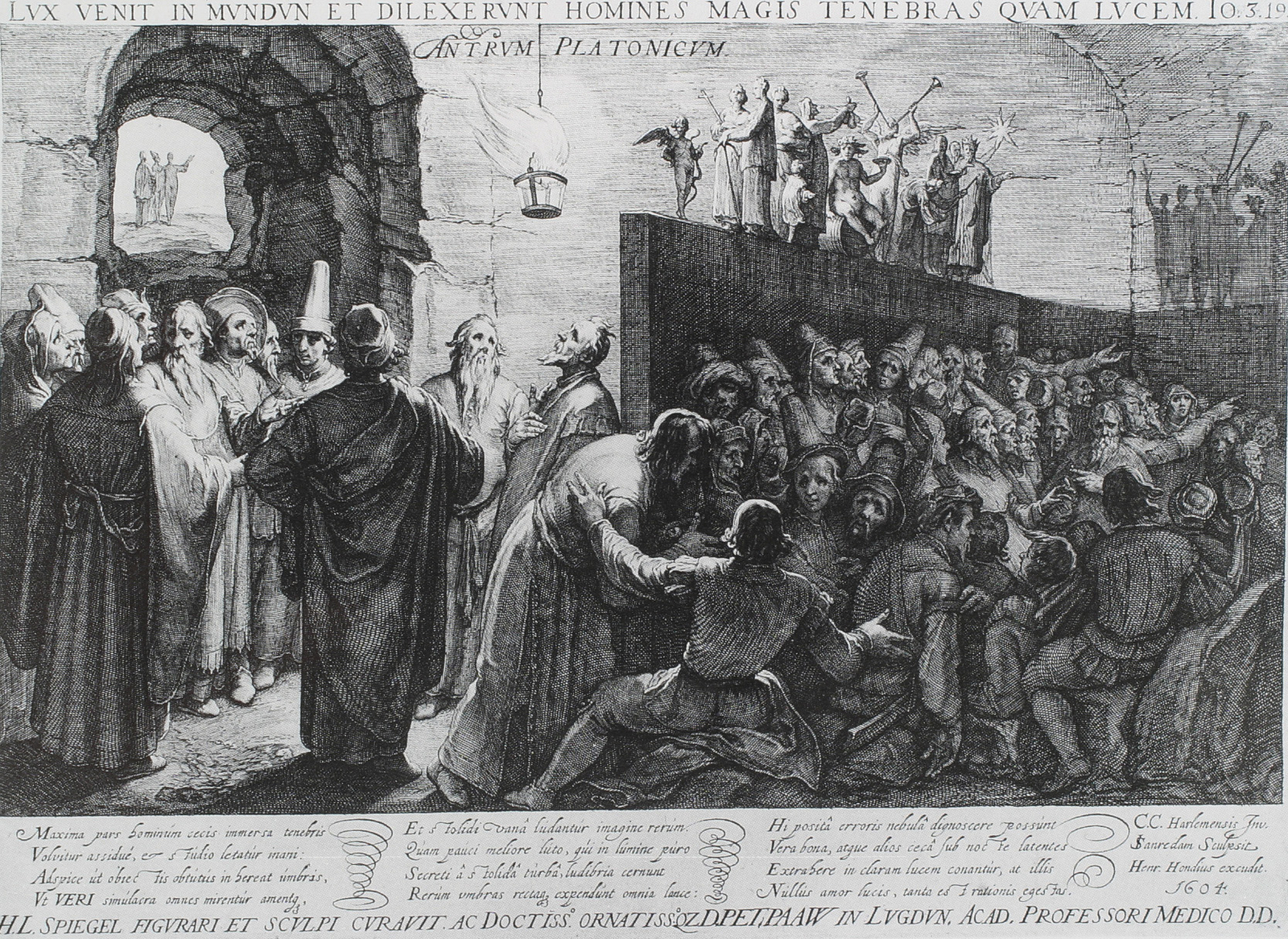
Plato's allegory of the cave by Jan Saenredam, according to Cornelis van Haarlem, 1604, Albertina, Vienna

Allegory of the cave

The allegory of the cave is an allegory presented by the Greek philosopher Plato in his work Republic (514a–520a, Book VII) to compare "the effect of education (παιδεία) and the lack of it on our nature". It is written as a dialogue between Plato's brother Glaucon and his mentor Socrates and is narrated by the latter. The allegory is presented after the analogy of the Sun (508b–509c) and the analogy of the divided line (509d–511e).

In the allegory, Plato describes people who have spent their entire lives chained by their necks and legs facing the bottom wall of a cave. Behind them a road runs across the cave, with a parapet wall adjacent to it; higher up the cave is a fire. Figures walking along the road are hidden by the parapet, but they carry objects which stick up above the parapet and cast shadows onto the wall which the prisoners are facing. Some of the figures on the road are speaking, and the echoes of their voices are taken by the prisoners to belong to the shadows they are watching. The shadows and sounds are the prisoners' sole reality.

Socrates explains how the philosopher is like a prisoner freed from the cave who comes to understand that the shadows on the wall are not the direct source of the images seen. A philosopher aims to understand and perceive the higher levels of reality symbolised by the sunlit world outside the cave. However, the other inmates of the cave do not even desire to leave their prison, for they know no better life.

Socrates remarks that this allegory should be paired with previous parts of the work, namely the analogy of the Sun and the analogy of the divided line.

== Summary ==
=== Introduction to the cave ===
Plato begins by having Socrates ask Glaucon to imagine a cave where people have been imprisoned from childhood. These prisoners are chained so that their legs and necks are fixed, forcing them to gaze at the wall in front of them and not to look around at the cave, each other, or themselves (514a–b). Behind the prisoners is a fire, and between the fire and the prisoners is a raised walkway with a low parapet wall, behind which people walk past carrying objects of many kinds, including images "of men and other living things" (514b).

The people walk behind the wall in such a way that their bodies do not cast shadows for the prisoners to see, but the objects they carry do; Socrates compares the parapet wall to the front of puppeteers' stalls (514b). The prisoners cannot see any of what is happening behind them; they are only able to see the shadows cast upon the cave wall in front of them. The sounds of the people talking echo off the walls; the prisoners believe these sounds come from the shadows (514c).

Socrates suggests that the shadows are reality for the prisoners because they have never seen anything else; they do not realize that what they see are shadows of objects in front of a fire, much less that these objects correspond to real things outside the cave which they do not see (514b–515a).

=== Departure from the cave ===
Socrates then supposes that the prisoners are forcefully released. A freed prisoner would look around and see the fire. The light would hurt his eyes and make it difficult for him to see the objects casting the shadows. If he were told that what he is seeing now is more real than the shadows, he would not believe it. In his pain, Socrates continues, the freed prisoner would turn away and run back to what he is accustomed to (that is, the shadows of the carried objects). The light "... would hurt his eyes, and he would escape by turning away to the things which he was able to look at, and these he would believe to be clearer than what was being shown to him".

Socrates continues: "Suppose... that someone should drag him... by force, up the rough ascent, the steep way up, and never stop until he could drag him out into the light of the sun". The prisoner would be angry and in pain, and this would only worsen when the radiant light of the sun overwhelms his eyes and blinds him.

"Slowly, his eyes adjust to the light of the sun. First he can see only shadows. Gradually he can see the reflections of people and things in water and then later see the people and things themselves. Eventually, he is able to look at the stars and moon at night until finally he can look upon the sun itself (516a)". Only after he can look straight at the sun "is he able to reason about it" and what it is (516b). (See also Plato's analogy of the Sun, which occurs near the end of The Republic, Book VI.)

=== Return to the cave ===
Socrates continues, saying that the freed prisoner would think that the world outside the cave was superior to the world he experienced in the cave and attempt to share this with the prisoners remaining in the cave in order to bring them on the journey he had just made himself; "he would bless himself for the change, and pity [the other prisoners]" and would want to bring his fellow cave dwellers out of the cave and into the sunlight (516c).

The returning prisoner, whose eyes have become accustomed to the sunlight, would be blind when he re-entered the cave, just as he was when he was first exposed to the sun (516e). The prisoners who remained, according to the dialogue, would infer from the returning man's blindness that the journey out of the cave had harmed him and that they should not undertake a similar journey. Socrates concludes that the prisoners, if they were able, would therefore reach out and kill anyone who attempted to drag them out of the cave (517a).

== Themes in the allegory appearing elsewhere in Plato's work ==
The allegory is related to Plato's theory of Forms, according to which the "Forms" (or "Ideas"), and not the material world known to us through sensation, possess the highest and most fundamental kind of reality. Knowledge of the Forms constitutes real knowledge or what Socrates considers "the Good". Socrates informs Glaucon that the most excellent people must follow the highest of all studies, which is to behold the Good. Those who have ascended to this highest level, however, must not remain there but must return to the cave and dwell with the prisoners, sharing in their labors and honors.

Plato's Phaedo contains similar imagery to that of the allegory of the cave; a philosopher recognizes that before philosophy, his soul was "a veritable prisoner fast bound within his body... and that instead of investigating reality of itself and in itself is compelled to peer through the bars of a prison".

== Scholarly discussion ==
Scholars debate the possible interpretations of the allegory of the cave, either looking at it from an epistemological standpoint—one based on the study of how Plato believes we come to know things—or through a political (politeia) lens. Much of the scholarship on the allegory falls between these two perspectives, with some completely independent of either. The epistemological view and the political view, prominently represented by Richard Lewis Nettleship and A. S. Ferguson, respectively, tend to be discussed most frequently.

Nettleship interprets the allegory of the cave as representative of our innate intellectual incapacity, in order to contrast our lesser understanding with that of the philosopher, as well as an allegory about people who are unable or unwilling to seek truth and wisdom. Ferguson, on the other hand, bases his interpretation of the allegory on the claim that the cave is an allegory of human nature and that it symbolizes the opposition between the philosopher and the corruption of the prevailing political condition.

Cleavages have emerged within these respective camps of thought, however. Much of the modern scholarly debate surrounding the allegory has emerged from Martin Heidegger's exploration of the allegory, and philosophy as a whole, through the lens of human freedom in his book The Essence of Human Freedom: An Introduction to Philosophy and The Essence of Truth: On Plato's Cave Allegory and Theaetetus. In response, Hannah Arendt, an advocate of the political interpretation of the allegory, suggests that through the allegory, Plato "wanted to apply his own theory of ideas to politics". Conversely, Heidegger argues that the essence of truth is a way of being and not an object. Arendt criticised Heidegger's interpretation of the allegory, writing that "Heidegger ... is off base in using the cave simile to interpret and 'criticize' Plato's theory of ideas".

Various scholars also debate the possibility of a connection between the work in the allegory of the cave and the work done by Plato considering the analogy of the divided line and the analogy of the Sun. The divided line is a theory presented to us in Plato's work the Republic. This is displayed through a dialogue given between Socrates and Glaucon in which they explore the possibility of a visible and intelligible world, with the visible world consisting of items such as shadows and reflections (displayed as AB) then elevating to the physical item itself (displayed as BC) while the intelligible world consists of mathematical reasoning (displayed by CD) and philosophical understanding (displayed by DE).

Many see this as an explanation for the way in which the prisoner in the allegory of the cave goes through the journey, first in the visible world with shadows such as those on the wall, then the realization of the physical with the understanding of concepts such as the tree being separate from its shadow. It enters the intelligible world as the prisoner looks at the sun.

The divided line – (AC) is generally taken as representing the visible world and (CE) as representing the intelligible world.

The Analogy of the Sun refers to the moment in book six in which Socrates, after being urged by Glaucon to define goodness, proposes instead an analogy through a "child of goodness". Socrates reveals this "child of goodness" to be the Sun, proposing that just as the Sun illuminates, bestowing the ability to see and be seen by the eye with its light, so the idea of goodness illumines the intelligible with truth, leading some scholars to believe this forms a connection of the Sun and the intelligible world within the realm of the allegory of the cave.

== Influence ==
The themes and imagery of Plato's cave have influenced later thought and culture. For instance:

- Francis Bacon used the term "Idols of the Cave" to refer to errors of reason arising from the idiosyncratic biases and preoccupations of individuals.
- In his 1658 discourse, Urn Burial, Thomas Browne states: "A Dialogue between two Infants in the womb concerning the state of this world, might handsomely illustrate our ignorance of the next, whereof methinks we yet discourse in Platoes denne, and are but Embryon Philosophers".
- Evolutionary biologist Jeremy Griffith's book A Species In Denial includes the chapter "Deciphering Plato's Cave Allegory".

=== In fiction and popular media ===
- The films The Conformist (1970), World on a Wire (1973), Cube (1997), Dark City (1998), The Truman Show (1998), The Matrix (1999), The Thirteenth Floor (1999), The Island (2005), City of Ember (2008), Us (2019), and An Urban Allegory (2024) model Plato's allegory of the cave, as does the TV series 1899.
- The Cave by José Saramago culminates in the discovery of Plato's Cave underneath the center, "an immense complex fusing the functions of an office tower, a shopping mall and a condominium".
- Ray Bradbury's novel Fahrenheit 451 (1953) explores the themes of reality and perception explored in Plato's allegory of the cave and Bradbury references Plato's work in the novel.
- Orphaned Land's 2018 release Unsung Prophets & Dead Messiahs is a concept album based on the allegory. Calling Plato an "unsung prophet", frontman Kobi Farhi explains that the "protest album" describes how humanity embraces the darkness and that the people are afraid to break their chains and embrace the light.
- In a 2018 episode of the FX television series Legion, the allegory of the cave is presented and explained to the audience via an educational segment narrated by Jon Hamm. The segment uses the allegory as a metaphor for narcissistic personality disorder and compares it to the mental impact of social media usage.
- In Honkai: Star Rail, The Amphoreus story arc and its official “Allegory of the Cave” soundtracks draw on Plato’s metaphor, using various narrative references to question the nature of perceived reality and truth, especially relating to the main antagonist of the story arc, Lycurgus.

== See also ==
- Allegorical interpretations of Plato
- Anekantavada
- Brain in a vat
- Enlightenment
- Experience machine
- Flatland
- Intelligibility (philosophy)
- Kupamanduka
- Nous – Noumenon
- Phaneron
- Plato's Republic in popular culture
- Phantasmagoria
- Simulation hypothesis
- Holographic principle
- Blind men and an elephant, a rough equivalent in Eastern Philosophy
- Maya (illusion)
- Surrogation
