= Form of the Good =

Superlative concept in the philosophy of Plato

The Form of the Good or simply the Good (Ancient Greek: ἡ τοῦ ἀγαθοῦ ἰδέα (Note: Transliteration: hē toû agathoû idéa)), is a concept in the philosophy of Plato. In Plato's Theory of Forms, Forms are abstract ideals that embody the essential qualities of concepts, giving meaning and intelligibility to other objects, such as those in the physical world.

The Good is the fundamental Form that underpins the system of Forms itself by making them meaningful and intelligible in turn, which Plato explains using the Analogy of the Sun: just as the Sun gives life to the world and natural light for the eye to see it, the Good gives essence to the Forms and a way for the mind to perceive them.

== Uses in The Republic ==
The first references that are seen in The Republic to the Form of the Good are within the conversation between Glaucon and Socrates (454 c–d). When he is trying to answer such difficult questions pertaining to the definition of justice, Plato identifies that we should not "introduce every form of difference and sameness in nature" instead we must focus on "the one form of sameness and difference that was relevant to the particular ways of life themselves" which is the form of the Good. This form is the basis for understanding all other forms; it is what allows us to understand everything else. Through the conversation between Socrates and Glaucon (508 a–c), Plato analogizes the form of the Good with the sun as it is what allows us to see things. Here, Plato describes how the sun allows for sight. But he makes a very important distinction, "sun is not sight" but it is "the cause of sight itself." As the sun is in the visible realm, the form of Good is in the intelligible realm. It is "what gives truth to the things known and the power to know to the knower". It is not only the "cause of knowledge and truth, it is also an object of knowledge".

Plato identifies how the form of the Good allows for the cognizance to understand such difficult concepts as justice. He identifies knowledge and truth as important, but through Socrates (508d–e) says, "good is yet more prized". He then proceeds to explain "although the good is not being" it is "superior to it in rank and power", it is what "provides for knowledge and truth" (508e).

== Scholarly analysis ==
Plato writes that the Form (or Idea) of the Good is the origin of knowledge although it is not knowledge itself, and from the Good, things that are just and true, gain their usefulness and value. Humans are compelled to pursue the good, but no one can hope to do this successfully without philosophical reasoning. According to Plato, true knowledge is conversant, not about those material objects and imperfect intelligences which we meet within our daily interactions with all mankind, but rather it investigates the nature of those purer and more perfect patterns which are the models after which all created beings are formed. Plato supposes these perfect types to exist from all eternity and calls them the Forms or Ideas. As these Forms cannot be perceived by human senses, whatever knowledge we attain of the Forms must be seen through the mind's eye (cf. Parmenides 132a), while ideas derived from the concrete world of flux are ultimately unsatisfactory and uncertain (see the Theaetetus). He maintains that degree of skepticism which denies all permanent authority to the evidence of sense. In essence, Plato suggests that justice, truth, equality, beauty, and many others ultimately derive from the Form of the Good.

=== Aristotle's criticism ===
Aristotle discusses the Forms of Good in critical terms several times in both of his major surviving ethical works, the Eudemian and Nicomachean Ethics. Aristotle argues that Plato's Form of the Good does not apply to the physical world, for Plato does not assign "goodness" to anything in the existing world. Because Plato's Form of the Good does not explain events in the physical world, humans have no reason to believe that the Form of the Good exists and the Form of the Good is thereby irrelevant to human ethics.

=== Other criticisms ===
Plato's Form of the Good is often criticized as too general. Plato's Form of the Good does not define things in the physical world that are good, and therefore lacks connectedness to reality. Because Plato's Form of the Good lacks instruction, or ways for the individual to be good, Plato's Form of the Good is not applicable to human ethics since there is no defined method for which goodness can be pursued. Through Socrates in The Republic, Plato acknowledges the Form of the Good as an elusive concept and proposes that the Form of the Good be accepted as a hypothesis, rather than criticized for its weaknesses. According to Socrates in The Republic, the only alternative to accepting a hypothesis is to refute all the objections against it, which is counterproductive in the process of contemplation.

Aristotle along with other scholars sees the Form of the Good as synonymous with the idea of One. Plato claims that Good is the highest Form, and that all objects aspire to be good. Since Plato does not define good things, interpreting Plato's Form of the Good through the idea of One allows scholars to explain how Plato's Form of the Good relates to the physical world. According to this philosophy, in order for an object to belong to the Form of the Good, it must be One and have the proper harmony, uniformity, and order to be in its proper form.

Philosopher Rafael Ferber dismissed Aristotle's view that the 'Good' is 'One' and wrote that the Form of the Good is self-contradictory. Ferber claimed that Plato's Form of the Good could be simultaneously defined and unknown, and be in a state of both "being" and "not being".

Plato's Forms are also critiqued for being treated as the reason for all things, as opposed to being an essence in itself. Some scholars also believe that Plato intended the Form to be the essence of which things come into existence. These different interpretations of Plato's intention for the Form may be attributed to the idea that Plato did not have a systematic definition of the Form itself.

== Influence ==
Plato's writings on the meaning of virtue and justice permeate through the Western philosophical tradition. Plotinus, the founder of neoplatonism, had principles that were heavily influenced by the Good. His concept of 'the One' is equivalent to 'the Good' because it describes an ultimate ontological truth. 'The One' is both 'uncaused' and the cause of being for everything else in the universe. Plotinus compared his principle of 'the One' to an illuminating light, as Plato did with the Form of the Good. As a result of Plotinus' school of neoplatonism, the bulk of understanding of Platonic philosophy until the 19th century came through Plotinus' interpretation of it. Many theologians and philosophers of Judaism, Christianity and Islam looked to the ideas of Platonism through the lens of Plotinus.

Amphis, a comic playwright of Athens, has one of his characters say: "And as for the good that you are likely to get on her account, I know no more about it, master, than I do of the good of Plato." There is an ancient anecdotal tradition that Plato gave a public lecture entitled "On the Good" which so confused the audience that most walked out. At the end of the lecture Plato said to those hearers who remained: 'The Good is the One".

== See also ==
- Aletheia (truth)
- Influence of Plotinus
- Seventh Letter
- Summum bonum
- The Allegory of the Cave
- The Divided Line
- The One
- Theory of forms
- Transcendentals
- Value (ethics)
- Virtue
