= Analogy of the Sun =

Platonic philosophical allegory

The allegory of the Sun (or simile of the Sun or metaphor of the Sun) is found in the sixth book of The Republic (507b–509c), written by the Greek philosopher Plato as a dialogue between his brother Glaucon and Socrates, and narrated by the latter. Upon being urged by Glaucon to define goodness, a cautious Socrates professes himself incapable of doing so. Instead he draws an allegory and offers to talk about "the child of goodness" (Ancient Greek: "ἔκγονός τε τοῦ ἀγαθοῦ"). Socrates reveals this "child of goodness" to be the Sun, proposing that just as the Sun illuminates, bestowing the ability to see and be seen by the eye, with its light, so the idea of goodness illumines the intelligible with truth. While the allegory sets forth both epistemological and ontological theories, it is debated whether these are most authentic to the teaching of Socrates or its later interpretations by Plato.

== Analysis ==
Plato's use of such an allegory can be interpreted for many different reasons in philosophy. For example, Plato uses them to illustrate and help illuminate his arguments. In the Allegory of the Sun, Socrates compares the "Good" with the Sun. Plato might be using the image of the Sun to help bring life to his arguments or to make the argument more clearly understood. David Hume once wrote, "All our reasonings concerning matters of fact are founded on a species of Analogy."

Plato makes the claim that "sight and the visible realm are deficient." He argues that for the other senses to be used all that is needed is the sense itself and that which can be sensed by it (e.g., to taste sweetness, one needs the sense of taste and that which can be tasted as sweet), but "even if a person's eyes are capable of sight, and he's trying to use it, and what he's trying to look at is coloured, the sight will see nothing and the colours will remain unseen, surely, unless there is also present an extra third thing which is made specifically for this purpose." The third thing Plato is talking about is light. Through this allegory he equates that which gives us natural light, the Sun, as the source of goodness in this world.

As goodness stands in the intelligible realm to intelligence and the things we know,
so the sun stands in the visible realm to sight and the things we see.
— The Republic VI (508c)

In other words, Plato is saying that the true nature of reality cannot be comprehended by the ordinary senses. Thus, we should make use of the mind rather than the sensory organs to better understand the higher truths of the universe. The mind, much like sight, requires a "third thing" to function properly, and that third thing is Plato's idea of goodness. He likens a mind without goodness to sight without light; one cannot operate at peak efficiency without the other.

Well, here's how you can think about the mind as well. When its object is something which is lit up by truth and reality, then it has—and obviously has—intelligent awareness and knowledge. However, when its object is permeated with darkness (that is, when its object is something which is subject to generation and decay), then it has beliefs and is less effective, because its beliefs chop and change, and under these circumstances it comes across as devoid of intelligence. — The Republic VI (508d)

Having made these claims, Socrates asks Glaucon, "...which of the gods in heaven can you put down as cause and master of this, whose light makes our sight see so beautifully and the things to be seen?" (508a) Glaucon responds that both he and all others would answer that this is the sun. Analogously, Socrates says, as the sun illuminates the visible with light so the idea of goodness illuminates the intelligible with truth, which in turn makes it possible for people to have knowledge. Also, as the eye's ability to see is made possible by the light of the Sun so the soul's ability to know is made possible by the truth of goodness.

Understand then, that it is the same with the soul, thus: when it settles itself firmly in that region in which truth and real being brightly shine, it understands and knows it and appears to have reason; but when it has nothing to rest on but that which is mingled with darkness—that which becomes and perishes, it opines, it grows dim-sighted, changing opinions up and down, and is like something without reason. — The Republic VI (508d)

— translated by W. H. D. Rouse

The allusion to "...that which becomes and perishes..." relates to all of that which is perceived by the bodily senses. The bodily senses make it clear that all visible things are subject to change, which Socrates categorizes into either the change of becoming or the change of perishing. Socrates argues that the bodily senses can only bring us to opinions, conveying an underlying assumption that true knowledge is of that which is not subject to change.

Instead, Socrates continues, knowledge is to be found in "... that region in which truth and real being brightly shine..." (508d) This is the intelligible illuminated by the highest idea, that of goodness. Since truth and being find their source in this highest idea, only the souls that are illumined by this source can be said to possess knowledge, whereas those souls which turn away are "...mingled with darkness...". This subject is later vividly illustrated in the Allegory of the Cave (514a–520a), where prisoners bound in a dark cave since childhood are examples of these souls turned away from illumination.

Socrates continues by explaining that though light and sight both resemble the Sun neither can identify themselves with the Sun. Just as the Sun is rated higher than both light and sight, so is goodness rated more highly than knowledge and truth. It is goodness which allows us to know the truth and makes it possible to have knowledge. Hence goodness is more valuable than truth and knowledge as it holds a higher place. Through this allegory, Socrates helped Glaucon come to the realization that Goodness is of inestimable value, being both the source of knowledge and truth, as well as more valuable and unattainable than both.

Socrates also makes it clear that the Sun cannot be looked at, so it cannot be known from sense perception alone. Even today, humans still use all kinds of mathematical models, the physics of electromagnetic measurements, deductions, and logic to further know and understand the real sun as a fascinating being. The actual being is always far beyond our words, our thoughts, and our measurements. We truly can never fully look at and know the entire Sun, by the empirical method.

Plato further equates the Sun to the ultimate form of goodness by calling them both sources of "generation". The sunlight not only makes objects visible but is necessary for their growth and nourishment, similarly to how goodness not only makes it possible for things to be known, but also allows for things to be.

ANCIENT GREEK
τὸν ἥλιον τοῖς ὁρωμένοις οὐ μόνον οἶμαι τὴν τοῦ ὁρᾶσθαι δύναμιν παρέχειν φήσεις, ἀλλὰ καὶ τὴν γένεσιν καὶ αὔξην καὶ τροφήν, οὐ γένεσιν αὐτὸν ὄντα...
καὶ τοῖς γιγνωσκομένοις τοίνυν μὴ μόνον τὸ γιγνώσκεσθαι φάναι ὑπὸ τοῦ ἀγαθοῦ παρεῖναι, ἀλλὰ καὶ τὸ εἶναί τε καὶ τὴν οὐσίαν ὑπ᾽ ἐκείνου αὐτοῖς προσεῖναι, οὐκ οὐσίας ὄντος τοῦ ἀγαθοῦ, ἀλλ᾽ ἔτι ἐπέκεινα τῆς οὐσίας πρεσβείᾳ καὶ δυνάμει ὑπερέχοντος.

Translation:

TRANSLITERATION
tòn hḗlion toîs horōménois ou mónon oîmai tḕn toû horâsthai dúnamin parékhein phḗseis, allà kaì tḕn génesin kaì aúxēn kaì trophḗn, ou génesin autòn ónta...
kaì toîs gignōskoménois toínun mḕ mónon tò gignṓskesthai phánai hupò toû agathoû pareînai, allà kaì tò eînaí te kaì tḕn ousían hup᾽ ekeínou autoîs proseînai, ouk ousías óntos toû agathoû, all᾽ éti epékeina tês ousías presbeíāi kaì dunámei huperékhontos.

The sun provides not only the power of being seen for things seen, but, as I think you will agree, also their generation and growth and nurture, although it is not itself generation...
Similarly with things known, you will agree that the good is not only the cause of their becoming known, but the cause that they are, the cause of their state of being, although the good is not itself a state of being but something transcending far beyond it in dignity and power. — The Republic VI (509b)

— translated by W. H. D. Rouse

Socrates' main concern was that he did not want his followers to place Goodness, Knowledge, and Truth all on the same level. You can achieve Goodness from Truth and Knowledge, but just because you have Truth and Knowledge that does not mean you have Goodness. Plato writes:

Well, what I'm saying is that it's goodness which gives the things we know their truth and makes it possible for people to have knowledge. It is responsible for knowledge and truth, you should think of it as being within the intelligible realm, but you shouldn't identify it with knowledge and truth, otherwise you'll be wrong: For all their value, it is even more valuable. In the other realm, it is right to regard light and sight as resembling the sun; So in this realm it is right to regard knowledge and truth as resembling goodness, but not to identify either of them with goodness, which should be rated even more highly. — The Republic VI (508e-509a)

Ultimately, the Good itself is the whole point. The Good (the sun) provides the very foundation on which all other truth rests. Plato uses the image of the Sun to help define the true meaning of the Good. The Good "sheds light" on knowledge so that our minds can see true reality. Without the Good, we would only be able to see with our physical eyes and not the "mind's eye". The sun bequeaths its light so that we may see the world around us. If the source of light did not exist we would be in the dark and incapable of learning and understanding the true realities that surround us.

Incidentally, the metaphor of the Sun exemplifies a traditional interrelation between metaphysics and epistemology: interpretations of fundamental existence create—and are created by—ways of knowing. It also neatly sums up two views for which Plato is recognized: his rationalism and his realism (about universals).

Socrates, using the Simile of the Sun as a foundation, continues with the Allegory of the Divided Line (509d–513e) after which follows the Allegory of the Cave (514a–520a). In relation to the other metaphors, the intelligible method can help one to understand the Good, symbolized by the Sun. The divided line gives the details of the four stage process of moving from opinions, or shadows, all the way up to mathematics, logic, deduction, and the dialectical method. The Good can be defined as the right relation between all that exists, from humans, nature, to the First Cause.

== See also ==
- Allegorical interpretations of Plato
- Analogy of the Divided Line
- Plato's Republic in popular culture
- The Form of the Good
- Ecclesiastes
