= Theory of forms =

Philosophical theory attributed to Plato

The Theory of Forms or Theory of Ideas, (Note: Modern English textbooks and translations prefer "Theory of Forms" to "Theory of Ideas"; the latter, however, can lay claim to a long and respected tradition—starting with Cicero and continuing, in German philosophy especially, into the present—and some English philosophers and authors still prefer it. See W. D. Ross, Plato's Theory of Ideas (1951).) (Note: The name of this aspect of Plato's thought is not solely modern, but rather has a long history of use; however, it is attributed to Plato without any direct textual evidence that Plato himself holds the views espoused by the various speakers within the dialogues. The term was used at least as early as Diogenes Laërtius, who called it (Plato's) "Theory of Ideas": Πλάτων ἐν τῇ περὶ τῶν ἰδεῶν ὑπολήψει φησίν... ("Now Plato, in conceiving his theory of Ideas, says...")) (Note: Plato uses many different words for what is traditionally called Form in English translations and Idea in German and Latin translations (Cicero). These include idéa, morphē, eîdos, and parádeigma, but also génos, phýsis, and ousía. He also uses expressions such as to x auto, "the x itself" or kath' auto "in itself". See Christian Schäfer: Idee/Form/Gestalt/Wesen, in Platon-Lexikon, Darmstadt 2007, p. 157.) also known as Platonic idealism or Platonic realism, is a philosophical theory credited to the Classical Greek philosopher Plato.

A major concept in metaphysics, the theory suggests that the physical world is not as real or true as Forms (or Ideas, typically capitalized): the timeless, absolute, non-physical, and unchangeable essences of all things, which objects and matter in the physical world merely participate in, imitate, or resemble. In other words, Forms are various abstract ideals that exist even outside of human minds and that constitute the basis of reality. Thus, Plato's Theory of Forms is a type of philosophical realism, asserting that certain ideas are literally real, and a type of idealism, asserting that reality is fundamentally composed of ideas, or abstract objects.

Plato describes these entities only through the characters (primarily Socrates) in his dialogues, who sometimes suggest that these Forms are the only objects of study that can provide knowledge (as opposed to mere belief or opinion), and at other times contest the very existence of the Forms. The theory remains a general point of controversy in philosophy; nonetheless, it is considered to be a classical solution to the problem of universals.

== Etymology ==
Referring to Forms, Plato used a number of Ancient Greek terms that mainly relate to vision, sight, and appearance, including ἰδέα (idéā; from a root meaning to see), a word that precedes attested philosophical usage. Plato uses these aspects of sight and appearance in his dialogues to explain his Forms, including the supreme one: the Form of the Good. Other terms include εἶδος (eîdos) meaning "visible form", and the related terms μορφή (morphḗ) meaning "shape", (Note: Possibly cognate with Sanskrit bráhman. See Thieme (1952): Bráhman, ZDMG, vol. 102, p. 128.ZDMG online..) and φαινόμενα (phainómena) meaning "appearances", from φαίνω (phaínō) meaning "shine", ultimately from Indo-European *bʰeh₂- or *bhā-. The original meanings of these terms remained stable over the centuries before the beginning of Western philosophy, at which time they became equivocal, acquiring additional specialized philosophic meanings. Plato used the terms eidos and idea interchangeably.

== Pre-Socratic philosophy ==
The pre-Socratic philosophers, ancient Greek thinkers who predated Plato and his mentor (Socrates), noted that appearances change, and they began to ask what the thing that changes "really" is. If something changes, what is it that remains to ground the thing's identity? The answer was substance, which stands under the changes and is the actually existing thing being seen. The status of appearances now came into question, including how the appearance is related to the substance. For instance, the earliest known pre-Socratic philosopher, Thales, argued that the fundamental substance of which all things are made is water.

Scriptures written by Pythagoras, another pre-Socratic philosopher, suggest that he developed an earlier theory similar to Plato's Forms. For Pythagoras, like Plato, the substance or essence of all things was not something physical (like water) but rather something abstract. However, Pythagoras' theory was much narrower than Plato's, proposing that the non-physical and timeless essences that compose the physical world are specifically numbers, whereas Plato conceived of his Forms as a vast array of intangible ideals.

== Theory ==
The Forms are expounded in Plato's dialogues, wherein it is proposed that every (Note: In Parmenides 130c–e, Plato's Socrates doubts that things such as mud or filth are worthy of Forms of their own, speculating that these things are instead just as we see them—no more, no less. Parmenides, though, seems to think that this is an error, which some have taken to indicate that Plato himself ultimately acceded to the existence of Forms for all things. The question of exactly which entities reflect ideal Forms, and which do not, would remain an object of investigation for Plato's successors, both immediate and remote.) kind or quality—goodness, justice, equality, beds, horses, etc.—has a corresponding Form; these Forms are held to be that which is "really real", whereas sensible phenomena (i.e., those perceived through the senses) are merely their "shadows" or imitations: momentary portrayals of the Form, as realized under various circumstances. Thus, for Plato, Forms are more real than the objects of our everyday experience: though Forms are timeless and unchanging, physical things are in constant flux; where Forms are unqualified perfection, physical things are qualified and conditioned.

Form answers the question, "What is that, essentially?" That is, a Form is something like the essence of a thing or quality: that without which the thing would not be the kind of thing that it is. For example, there are countless and disparate tables in the world, but the "Form of Table" is that essence of "tableness" in virtue of which each particular table is a table. Alternatively, or in addition, a Form may be understood as a sort of objective "blueprint": the perfect and unchanging paradigm for some kind, quality, or mathematical object.

Given that such Forms are exactly the same whenever anyone chooses to consider them (as it is difficult to imagine what it would even mean for there to be a change in the very geometrical ideal of, say, the isosceles triangle)—i.e., time only affects the observer, not the ideal—and are similarly unaffected by location, Plato obtained what was perhaps his most original result, qua Forms: that they are aspatial (transcendent to space) and atemporal (transcendent to time). (Note: These terms (viz., those here prefixed with a-) are not ancient. For the usage, refer to "a- (2)". (Online Etymology Dictionary). They are, however, customary terms of modern metaphysics; for example, see Beck, Martha C. (1999). Plato's Self-Corrective Development of the Concepts of Soul, Form and Immortality in Three Arguments of the Phaedo. Edwin Mellon Press. p. 148. ISBN 0-7734-7950-3. See also Hawley, Dr. Katherine (2001). How Things Persist. Oxford: Clarendon Press. Chapter 1. ISBN 0-19-924913-X.) Neither sempiternal (enduring for all time) nor mortal, they transcend time altogether; similarly, they have no spatial dimensions—and thus neither any orientation in space—nor (like the point) do they possess locations. (Note: Space answers to matter, the place-holder of form: "... and there is a third nature [besides transcendent Form and sensible form], which is space [chōra], and is eternal [aei, 'always'], and admits not of destruction and provides a home for all created things ... we say of all existence that it must of necessity be in some place and occupy space ..." (Timaeus 52a–b). Some readers will have long since remembered that in Aristotle, time and space are accidental forms. Plato does not make this distinction, and concerns himself mainly with essential form. In Plato, if time and space were admitted to be Forms, time would be atemporal and space aspatial.)

Though Forms are non-physical, neither are they merely within the mind (i.e., they are real in the strictest sense of the word). Indeed, according to the Platonic understanding, the world of Form is—as well as transcendent to the sensible world—the essential basis both thereof, and of true (stable, enduring) knowledge. Conversely, sensible particulars—being changeable, subject-relative, and tied to unreliable perception—provide an apt basis for only opinion.

For example, consider a triangle drawn upon a blackboard: such a triangle, as drawn by a human hand, is necessarily imperfect—as will be all earthly triangles—so whence the recognition thereof as approximations of mathematically ideal triangles (which we have never seen)? For Plato, it is the intelligibility of the "Form of Triangle" that allows us to know the drawing on the chalkboard as a triangle. Similarly, the Form of the circle enables us to draw, define, speak, and write about particular circles—and to recognize and understand the ways in which they fall short of the ideal—though a perfect circle cannot be encountered or perceived by the senses.

For the Platonist, then, the idea of the perfect circle is discovered, not invented—the Form itself exists eternally, regardless of whether it is instantiated or cognized. It follows that the same would go for the Form of Beauty, and indeed for all Forms.

=== Intelligible realm and separation of the Forms ===
Plato often invokes poetic language—particularly in the Phaedo, Republic, and Phaedrus—to illustrate the mode in which the Forms are said to exist. Near the end of the Phaedo, for example, Plato describes the world of Forms as a pristine region of the physical universe located above the surface of the Earth. In the Phaedrus, the Forms are in a "place beyond heaven" (hyperouranios topos); and in the Republic, the sensible world is contrasted with the intelligible realm (noēton topon) in the famous Allegory of the Cave.

It would be a mistake to take Plato's imagery as positing the intelligible world as a literal physical space apart from this one. Plato emphasizes that the Forms are not beings that extend in space (or time), but rather subsist apart from any physical space whatsoever. Thus we read in the Symposium of the Form of Beauty: "It is not anywhere in another thing, as in an animal, or in earth, or in heaven, or in anything else, but itself by itself with itself" (211b). And in the Timaeus, Plato writes: "Since these things are so, we must agree that which keeps its own form unchangingly, which has not been brought into being and is not destroyed, which neither receives into itself anything else from anywhere else, nor itself enters into anything anywhere, is one thing." (52a; emphasis added.)

=== Ambiguities of the theory ===
==== What are Forms? ====
Plato's conception of Forms actually differs from dialogue to dialogue, and in certain respects it is never fully explained, so many aspects of the theory are open to interpretation. Forms are first introduced in the Phaedo, but in that dialogue the concept is taken as something with which the participants are already familiar, and the theory itself is not developed. Similarly, in the Republic, Plato relies on the concept of Forms as the basis of many of his arguments, but feels no need to argue at length for the validity of the theory itself. Commentators have been left with the task of explaining what Forms are and how physical objects participate in them, and there has been no shortage of disagreement.

Some scholars advance the view that Forms are paradigms, perfect examples on which the imperfect world is modeled; others place emphasis upon the Forms as universals, so that the Form of Beauty, for example, is that quality that all beautiful things share. Yet others interpret Forms as "stuffs", the conglomeration of all instances of a quality in the visible world; under this interpretation, we could say that there is a little beauty in one person, a little beauty in another, and so on—thence, all the beauty in the world put together is the Form of Beauty.

==== What things get Forms? ====
Plato himself was clearly aware of those ways in which his own theory was ambiguous or underspecified; in the Parmenides, for example, the titular character engages in incisive criticism thereof (see "Self-criticism", below), and Socrates expresses doubt as to whether there are Forms for all things, or for only some things. As Cornford points out, though the young Socrates is given as admitting that he has "often been puzzled about these things", in reference to whether or not there are Forms of Man, Fire, and Water, these nevertheless do appear as Forms in later works; however, others—such as hair, mud, and dirt—do not. Of these latter, Socrates is made to assert that "it would be too absurd to suppose" that they have Forms, though his interlocutor Parmenides seems to disagree: "Yes, for you are still young, and philosophy has not yet taken hold upon you, Socrates, as I think it will later."

Many interpret Parmenides (who is depicted, throughout the dialogue, as taking the philosophical lead) to here be voicing Plato's own judgment on the matter; and—more generally—it is likewise commonly supposed that Plato held there to be a Form for every (positively-defined) kind and property; but both positions have their dissenters. (Note: Aristotle, notably, writes that "we"—i.e., Platonists—"say there are no Forms" of artifacts such as houses or rings, though it is unclear how this is to be squared with Plato's seeming endorsement of the same at e.g. Republic X 596a–b.)

== Evidence of Forms ==
=== Human perception ===
In Cratylus, Plato writes: (Note: Aristotle, in Metaphysics Α987a29–b14 and Μ1078b9–32, says that Plato devised the Forms to answer a weakness in the doctrine of Heraclitus, who held that nothing exists in an enduring and stable manner: everything is in a state of ceaseless flux. If nothing exists stably, then nothing can be known, but rather only believed or opined. It is possible that Plato took the Socratic search for definitions and extrapolated it into a distinct metaphysical theory; little is known of the historical Socrates' own views, and the theory of Forms may be a Platonic innovation.)

But if the very nature of knowledge changes, at the time when the change occurs there will be no knowledge, and, according to this view, there will be no one to know and nothing to be known: but if that which knows and that which is known exist ever, and the beautiful and the good and every other thing also exist, then I do not think that they can resemble a process of flux, as we were just now supposing.

Plato believed—or, at least, has his Socrates hypothesize—that long before our bodies ever existed, our souls existed and inhabited heaven, whereat they became directly acquainted with the Forms themselves. Real knowledge, in the Platonic sense, is knowledge of the Forms; such knowledge cannot be gained through sensory experience alone, however, because Forms are not to be found within the sensible world. Our true knowledge of the Forms must thus arise from the faint memory of an initial heavenly acquaintance therewith; and so what we seem to have learned, we have in fact recollected instead.

=== Perfection ===
No one has ever seen a perfect circle, nor a perfectly straight line, yet everyone knows what a circle and a straight line are. Plato explains the rôle of Forms, in cases such as this, by way of analogy with the tool-maker's blueprint:

... when a man has discovered the instrument which is naturally adapted to each work, he must express this natural form, and not others which he fancies, in the material.

Perceived circles or lines are not exactly circular or straight, and true circles and lines could never be detected since by definition they are sets of infinitely small points. But if the perfect ones were not real, how could they direct the manufacturer?

=== Universals ===
A given quality (e.g., sphericity) often appears to be possessed alike by multiple distinct entities at once (e.g., ball-bearings as well as tennis balls); the question as to what exactly (if anything) is shared therebetween, and how it is that one thing in general could yet be many things in particular, is known as the problem of universals. Plato is usually taken to be the originator of the conundrum, and he advanced the theory of Forms as providing a solution: when the same general quality can be predicated of many particular objects, it is because the particulars partake of the same Form; e.g., a beautiful flower, a beautiful face, and a beautiful building—though beautiful in entirely different ways—all participate in the Form of the Beautiful; it is this that enables us to speak of their common beauty, and "beauty" in general (rather than being able only to speak, separately, of particular beautiful things).

Thus, the Form—though itself a distinct singular entity—causes, (Note: In some unspecified way; Plato gives various metaphors for the mechanism, such as that of a paradigm vs. a copy thereof, or the "stamping" of an image into a medium.) or explains, the plurality of its sensible instances in particular objects, and there is no need to suppose that one and the same thing be both one and many simultaneously. As Socrates states, in the dialogue Parmenides:

"If [someone] shows, however, that the things that partake in both [the Like and the Unlike] are subjected to both, for me there is nothing strange about that, Zeno—not even if he shows that all things are one by participating in the One, and that the same [all things] are also many by participating in Many. But if he demonstrates that the One, itself, is many, and in turn that the Many is one, then I will be astonished."

== Criticisms of Platonic Forms ==
=== Self-criticism ===
==== Participation ====
An immediate difficulty, and perhaps one of the most fundamental, arises when one attempts to conceptualize just how exactly it is that an object "participates" in a form (or Form). The young Socrates explains his solution to the problem via a metaphor:

Nay, but the idea may be like the day which is one and the same in many places at once, and yet continuous with itself; in this way each idea may be one and the same in all at the same time.

This solution calls for a distinct Form, in which the particular instances participate while retaining their separate identities; i.e., the Form is somehow "shared out", like the day, to many places. (Note: The concept of "participation"—rendered, in the Greek, by more than one word—seems to have been as obscure in Greek as it is in English, and the exact details (both as to the mechanism itself, and Plato's understanding thereof) are still hotly contested.) Plato hypothesized that distinctness meant existence as an independent being—thus leaving his theory open to attack via the famous Third Man argument of Parmenides, (Note: The name is from Aristotle, who mentions, in Metaphysics A.IX.990b.15, "[the argument] they call the 'third man'." A summary of the argument and the quote from Aristotle can be found in the venerable Grote, George (1880). "App. I: Aristotle's Objections to Plato's Theory". Aristotle: Second Edition with Additions. London: John Murray. pp. 559–560, note b. Grote points out that Aristotle lifted this argument from the Parmenides of Plato; certainly, his words indicate the argument was already well-known under that name.) which many have held to prove that Forms cannot both exist independently and yet be participated in by particulars. (Note: Analysis of the argument has been going on for quite a number of centuries now, and some analyses are complex, technical and perhaps tedious for the general reader. A selection of such analyses may be found in the following: Hales, Steven D. (1991). "The Recurring Problem of the Third Man" (PDF). Auslegung. 17 (1): 67–80. Archived from the original (PDF) on 26 September 2007.; Durham, Michael (1997). "Two Men and the Third Man" (PDF). The Dualist: Undergraduate Journal of Philosophy (Stanford University). 4. Archived from the original (PDF) on 5 February 2009.)

==== The Third Man argument ====
The argument, in outline, proceeds as follows. Suppose that the members of a set E are all possessed of a certain quality—canonically, "largeness"—in virtue of their participating in the Form of Largeness (sometimes also termed "Largeness Itself"), F_{1}; suppose, further, that F_{1} is itself large (else, in what way might participation therein confer or explain largeness?). A new collection of large entities may then be considered—the original members of E, plus F_{1}—all of which must, as before, be large in virtue of participating in some Form of Largeness F_{2}. Given a few fairly natural premisses (e.g., that a Form is not identical to any of its participants / nothing participates in itself), an infinite regress now becomes inevitable: since F_{1} and F_{2} must be distinct, there is another set of large things—comprising F_{1}, F_{2}, and the members of E—all of which must participate in a third distinct "Form of Largeness"; and so on, ad infinitum. That is: an endless series of "third men".

Plato's Socrates and his titular interlocutor take for granted that the regress is fatal to Socrates' initial theory of Forms: the infinity of distinct Forms-of-Largeness might—as well as being intuitively unappealing, and conflicting with the desideratum that there be only one unique Form per predicate—be considered to fail as an explanation for largeness (the largeness of the entities in E is never grounded in a final principle), which some take to be Plato's intended interpretation; others understand the argument to rest upon the fact that, given a model wherein a "piece" of a Form is in whatever partakes thereof, the Forms of the regress are not unitary but rather must be composed of infinite parts.

==== The "Likeness Regress" and other arguments of Parmenides ====
The young Socrates did not give up the Theory of Forms over the Third Man but took another tack: that Forms are paradigms, of a sort, which their participants resemble; since resemblance is a symmetrical relation, this necessarily means that the Forms also resemble their participants. Parmenides immediately destroys this suggestion, as well, with the "Likeness Regress"—an argument variously interpreted as being either a retread of the Third Man, or different thereto in a crucial respect. Whichever interpretation may be correct, the argument is successful, and Parmenides thence goes on to raise a further pair of difficulties with Socrates' version of the Forms. (Note: One of the aforementioned pair of arguments seems to end in the conclusion that humans cannot obtain knowledge of the Forms (though the premisses from which the argument proceeds are likely to seem obscure to the non-specialist; for details, see e.g. the SEP entry on the Parmenides). As recorded in the dialogue, Socrates appears to have been stymied by these objections; his later answer would be that men already know the Forms because they were in the world of Forms before birth—the objects and qualities of the sensible world only recall these Forms to memory. (Note: Plato to a large extent identifies that which is today called insight with recollection: "whenever on seeing one thing you conceived another, whether like or unlike, there must surely have been an act of recollection" (Phaedo 229). Thus, geometric reasoning on the part of persons who know no geometry is not insight, but recollection. Plato does, however, recognize the possibility of insight with regard to "the course of scrutiny": "... with a sudden flash there shines forth understanding about every problem ..." (The Seventh Letter 344b).))

Despite Parmenides' characterization of this latter pair as, together, the greatest difficulty the theory had yet faced, scholars are divided upon the interpretation and validity thereof; similarly, whether the Third Man and Likeness regresses are truly fatal to the theory depends upon the axioms from which one begins, and various opinions exist as to what these should be. (Note: See, e.g., the work of Rickless and Meinwald.)

=== Aristotelian criticism ===
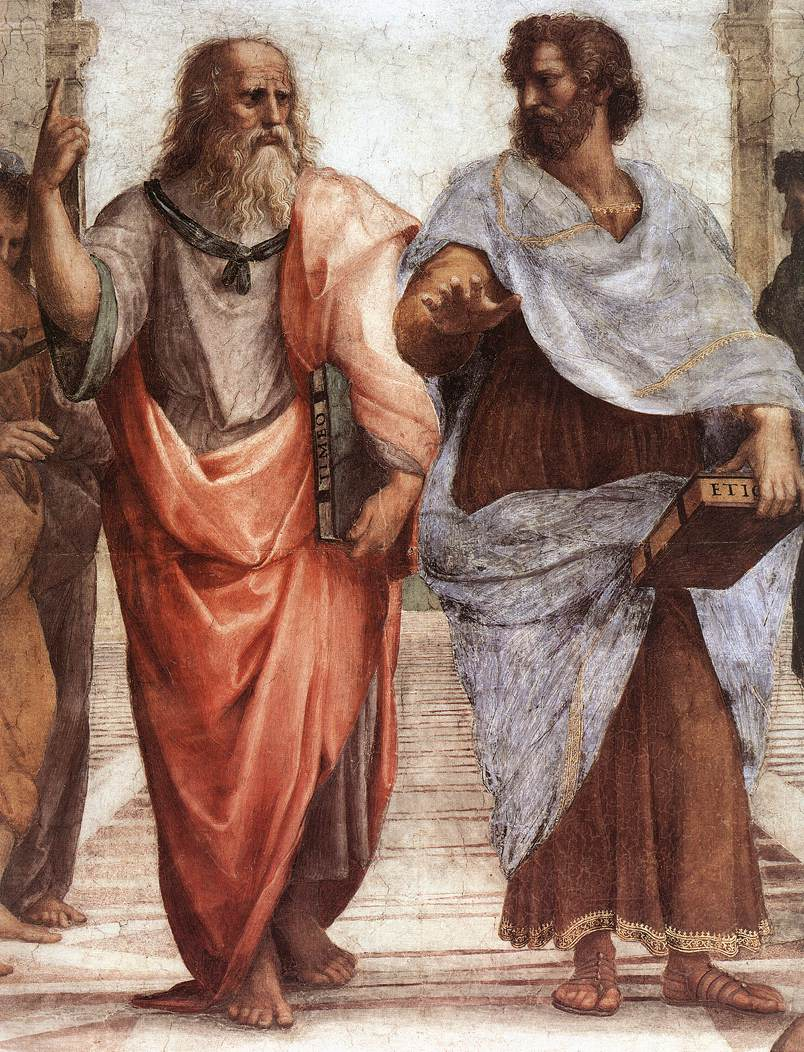
The central image from Raphael's The School of Athens (1509–1511), depicting Plato (left) and Aristotle (right). Plato is depicted pointing upwards, in reference to his belief in the higher Forms, while Aristotle disagrees and gestures downwards to the here-and-now, in reference to his belief in empiricism.

The topic of Aristotle's criticism of Plato's theory of Forms is vast, and continues to expand. Rather than quote Plato, Aristotle often summarized. Classical commentaries thus recommended Aristotle as an introduction to Plato, even when in disagreement; the Platonist Syrianus used Aristotelian critiques to further refine the Platonic position on Forms in use in his school, a position handed down to his student Proclus. As a historian of prior thought, Aristotle is invaluable; however, this was secondary to his own dialectic, and in some cases he treats purported implications as if Plato had actually mentioned them, or even defended them. For examining Aristotle's critiques, it is helpful to understand his own hylomorphic forms, by which he intended to salvage much of Plato's theory.

Aristotle argues that on the standard Platonic assumptions, as he sees them, it seems that Forms ought exist only for substances: Forms—being entities that exist separately and independently—are clearly (Aristotelian) substances, and whatever participates in such a Form must share in this substantiality. But many Platonic arguments, such as the "arguments from the sciences", (Note: In brief, these arguments aim to show that—because sensible particulars are in constant flux, obscured by various inessential features, too specific to be suitable as general causes, and so on—(scientific) knowledge requires that there be Forms; hence, given that science is clearly possible, Forms must in fact exist.) appear to militate in favor of Forms for many non-substantial entities as well—e.g., health is an object of study in the science of medicine, yet it is certainly not a substance.

Given that Aristotle has accurately interpreted his predecessor's claims, Plato seems to have been caught in a contradiction: only substances have corresponding Forms, yet there are Forms that correspond to the (often non-substantial) objects of science. Aristotle's critiques proved, and remain, highly influential, though scholars have differed as to whether—and to what degree—this criticism and its fellows are truly problematic for (Platonic) Forms; Scottish philosopher W. D. Ross, for example, objects that this is a mischaracterization of Plato, whereas Gail Fine finds Aristotle to be broadly correct. (Note: Though she writes that "Aristotle is right to say that the Arguments from the Sciences are invalid arguments for the existence of forms, if forms are taken to be non-sensible, everlasting, separate, perfect paradigms[...]", she also concludes that "[...] once we understand Aristotle's interpretative strategies, we can avoid saying that Aristotle either misinterprets or refutes Plato." (Emphasis added.))

Aristotle outlines another, related criticism: that, if Forms correspond to universals, this leads to the existence of (purportedly) non-Platonic forms—not only the Form of Difference (or of "Otherness"), but also the Not-Tall, the Not-Beautiful, etc. As Ross indicates, however, Plato himself did not make the leap from "A is not B" to "A is Not-B"; as far as the dialogues go, Plato's own view could easily be that Otherness only applies to various particulars, which need not each correspond to actual "Not-Forms". For example, there would then be no "Form of Not-Greek", since "not Greek" groups together sundry peoples by only the lack of a feature—i.e., "not being (or speaking) Greek"—in common; it is not a natural division, in other words. (Note: As Plato has his Eleatic Stranger object, this criterion no more picks out a proper kind than would "marking off every number except 10,000".) Under this interpretation, there is—rather than a "Form of Not-Greek"—just the Form of Difference from, or in relation to, Greekness; and likewise for tallness, beauty, and so on.

Aristotle also developed arguments against Plato's epistemology, in regard to the latter's hypothesis that we know Forms through a remembrance of existing—along with the Forms—in "a place beyond heaven".

=== Scholastic criticism ===
Nominalism (from Latin nomen, "name") says that ideal universals are mere names, human creations; the blueness shared by sky and blue jeans is a shared concept, communicated by our word "blueness". Blueness is held not to have any existence beyond that which it has in instances of blue things. This concept arose in the Middle Ages, as part of Scholasticism.

Scholasticism was a highly multinational, polyglottal school of philosophy, and the nominalist argument may be more obvious if an example is given in more than one language. For instance, colour terms are strongly variable by language; some languages consider blue and green the same colour, others have monolexemic terms for several shades of blue, which are considered different; other languages, like the Mandarin qing denote both blue and black. The German word "Stift" means a pen or a pencil, and also anything of the same shape. The English "pencil" originally meant "small paintbrush"; the term later included the silver rod used for silverpoint. The German "Bleistift" and "Silberstift" can both be called "Stift", but this term also includes felt-tip pens, which are clearly not pencils.

The shifting and overlapping nature of these concepts makes it easy to imagine them as mere names, with meanings not rigidly defined, but specific enough to be useful for communication. Given a group of objects, how is one to decide if it contains only instances of a single Form, or several mutually exclusive Forms?

== See also ==
- Abstract object theory
- Analogy of the Divided Line
- Archetype
- As above, so below
- Correspondence
- Dmuta in Mandaeism
- Exaggerated realism
- Form of the Good
- Hyperuranion
- Jungian archetypes
- Map–territory relation
- Mathematical Platonism
- Neoplatonism
- Plato's unwritten doctrines, for Plato's (putative) "higher" esoteric theories
- Plotinus
- Problem of universals
- Substantial form
- True form (Taoism)

== Primary sources ==
Dialogues that discuss Forms

- Meno: 71–81, 85–86: The discovery (or "recollection") of knowledge as latent in the soul, pointing forward to the theory of Forms
- Phaedo

73–80: The theory of recollection restated as knowledge of the Forms in soul before birth in the body,109–111: The myth of the afterlife, 100c: The theory of absolute beauty

- Symposium: 210–211: The archetype of Beauty.
- Phaedrus: 248–250: Reincarnation according to knowledge of the true, 265–266: The unity problem in thought and nature.
- Cratylus: 389–390: The archetype as used by craftsmen, 439–440: The problem of knowing the Forms.
- Theaetetus: 184–186: Universals understood by mind and not perceived by senses.
- Sophist: 246–259: True essence a Form. Effective solution to participation problem. The problem with being as a Form; if it is participatory then non-being must exist and be being.
- Parmenides: 129–135: Participatory solution of unity problem. Things partake of archetypal like and unlike, one and many, etc. The nature of the participation (Third man argument). Forms not actually in the thing. The problem of their unknowability.
- Republic

- Book III: 402–403: Education the pursuit of the Forms.
- Book V: 472–483: Philosophy the love of the Forms. The philosopher-king must rule.
- Books VI–VII: 500–517: Philosopher-guardians as students of the Beautiful and Just implement archetypical order, Metaphor of the Sun: The sun is to sight as Good is to understanding, Allegory of the Cave: The struggle to understand forms like men in cave guessing at shadows in firelight.
- Books IX–X, 589–599: The ideal state and its citizens. Extensive treatise covering citizenship, government and society with suggestions for laws imitating the Good, the True, the Just, etc. Metaphor of the three beds.

- Timaeus: 27–52: The design of the universe, including numbers and physics. Some of its patterns. Definition of matter.
- Philebus: 14–18: Unity problem: one and many, parts and whole.
- Seventh Letter: 342–345: The epistemology of Forms. The Seventh Letter is possibly spurious.

== Bibliography ==
- Alican, Necip Fikri; Thesleff, Holger (2013). "Rethinking Plato's Forms". Arctos: Acta Philologica Fennica. 47: 11–47. doi:10.71390/arctos.85075. ISSN 0570-734X.
- Alican, Necip Fikri (2014). "Rethought Forms: How Do They Work?". Arctos: Acta Philologica Fennica. 48: 25–55. doi:10.71390/arctos.85056. ISSN 0570-734X.
- Cornford, Francis MacDonald (1957). Plato and Parmenides. New York: The Liberal Arts Press.
- Dancy, Russell (2004). Plato's Introduction of Forms. Cambridge: Cambridge University Press. ISBN 978-0-521037-18-1.
- Fine, Gail (1993). On Ideas: Aristotle's Criticism of Plato's Theory of Forms. Oxford: Oxford University Press. ISBN 978-0-198235-49-1. OCLC 191827006. Reviewed by Gerson, Lloyd P (1993). "Gail Fine, On Ideas. Aristotle's Criticism of Plato's Theory of Forms". Bryn Mawr Classical Review.
- Fine, Gail (2003). Plato on Knowledge and Forms: Selected Essays. Oxford: Clarendon Press. ISBN 978-0-199245-59-8.
- Grabowski, Francis A. III (2008). Plato, Metaphysics and the Forms. Continuum Studies in Ancient Philosophy. Continuum.
- Matía Cubillo, Gerardo Óscar (2021). "Suggestions on How to Combine the Platonic Forms to Overcome the Interpretative Difficulties of the Parmenides Dialogue", Revista de Filosofía de la Universidad de Costa Rica, vol. 60, 156: 157–171.
- Patterson, Richard (1985). Image and Reality in Plato's Metaphysics. Indianapolis: Hackett Publishing Company. ISBN 978-0-915145-72-0.
- Rodziewicz, Artur (2012). IDEA AND FORM. ΙΔΕΑ ΚΑΙ ΕΙΔΟΣ. On the Foundations of the Philosophy of Plato and the Presocratics (IDEA I FORMA. ΙΔΕΑ ΚΑΙ ΕΙΔΟΣ. O fundamentach filozofii Platona i presokratyków). Wroclaw: WUWR.
- Ross, William David (1951). Plato's Theory of Ideas. Oxford: Clarendon Press. ISBN 978-0-837186-35-1.
- Thesleff, Holger (2009). Platonic Patterns: A Collection of Studies by Holger Thesleff. Las Vegas: Parmenides Publishing. ISBN 978-1-930972-29-2.
- Welton, William A., ed. (2002). Plato's Forms: Varieties of Interpretation. Lanham: Rowman & Littlefield. ISBN 978-0-7391-0514-6.
