= Aql al-Fa'al =

Aql al-Fa'al (Arabic: العقل الفعال, romanized: al-'Aql al-Fa'al) or Wahib al-Suwar is a kind of reason in Islamic philosophy and psychology. It is considered as the lowest level of celestial intelligences.

== Concept ==
Aql has many different meanings in Islamic philosophy and psychology. The word aql philologically means to restrain or to tie. It is something which prevents human from judgment and behavior. Semantically aql gradually transformed to reason. In Islamic philosophy, particularly the peripatetic school, the technical use of aql to some extent is under the influence of Greek philosophy.

== Historical background ==
Farabi numerated several meanings of aql in his book.

Farabi tries to reconcile between the peripatetic understanding of active intellect with the Islamic notion of prophecy. Farabi identifies active intellect with Jibril (the angel of revelation in Islam). Humans can be transformed from Aql bi al-Quwwah (potential intellect) into Aql bi al-Fi'l (actual intellect). Thereby men can be free from the darkness of ignorance. Finally aql transforms into Aql al-Mustafad (acquired intellect). In the level that acquires intellect, aql reflects upon its own contents through inquiring among its similarities and distinction.

== See also ==
- Active intellect
- Islamic philosophy
