= Passive intellect =

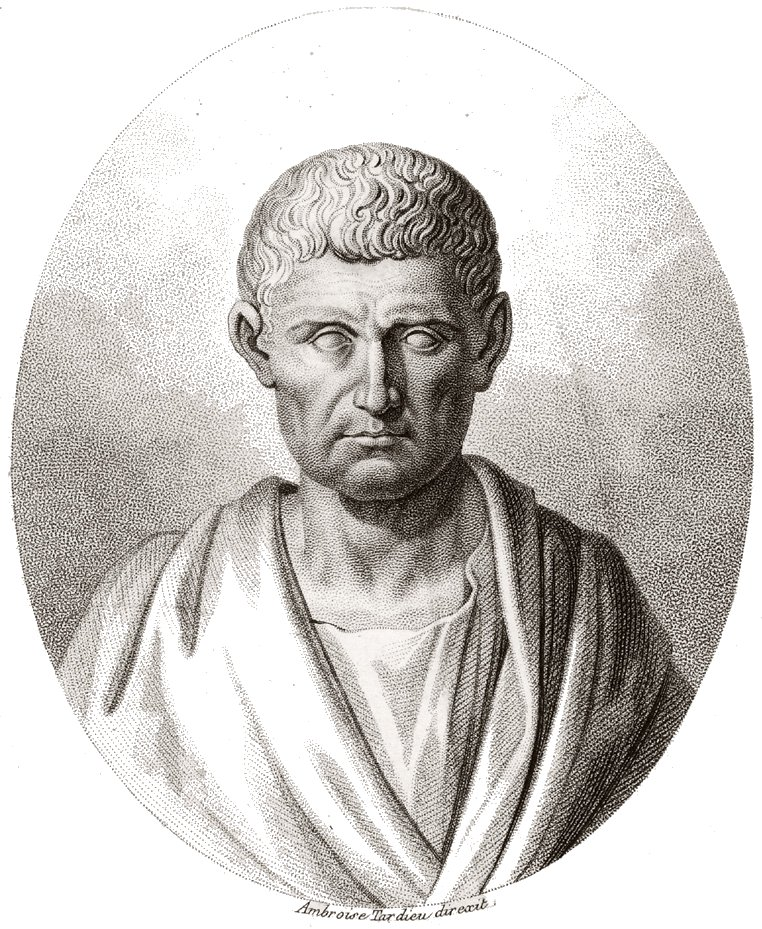
An image of Aristotle

The passive intellect (Latin: intellectus possibilis; also translated as potential intellect or material intellect), is a term used in philosophy alongside the notion of the active intellect in order to give an account of the operation of the intellect (nous), in accordance with the theory of hylomorphism, as most famously put forward by Aristotle.

== Aristotle's conception ==
Aristotle gives his most substantial account of the passive intellect (nous pathetikos) in De Anima (On the Soul), Book III, chapter 4. In Aristotle's philosophy of mind, the passive intellect "is what it is by becoming all things." By this Aristotle means that the passive intellect can potentially become anything by receiving that thing's intelligible form. The active intellect (nous poietikos) is then required to illuminate the passive intellect to make the potential knowledge into knowledge in actuality, in the same way that light makes potential colors into actual colors. The analysis of this distinction is very brief, which has led to dispute as to what it means.

== Interpretations ==
Greek thought

While Greek commentators such as Alexander of Aphrodisias and Themistius were broadly silent on the active intellect (debate over this would only become heated in the thirteenth-century Christian West in the context of debates over whether Avicenna or Averroes provided the account of the working of the intellect that best cohered with Christian doctrine), they provided a great deal of commentary on the nature of the passive intellect. For instance, to Alexander of Aphrodisias (who coined for this power the term 'material intellect', a name later taken up by Averroes) the passive intellect was a separate intellect from the active.

Averroes and Aquinas

Later philosophers, including Averroes and St. Thomas Aquinas, proposed mutually exclusive interpretations of Aristotle's distinction between the active and passive intellect. Other terms used are "material intellect" and "potential intellect", the point being that the active intellect works on the passive intellect to produce knowledge (acquired intellect), in the same way that actuality works on potentiality or form on matter.

Averroes held that the passive intellect, being analogous to unformed matter, is a single substance common to all minds, and that the differences between individual minds are rooted in their phantasms as the product of the differences in the history of their sense perceptions. Aquinas argues against this position in Disputed Questions on the Soul (Quaestiones disputatae de Anima), asserting that, while the passive intellect is one specifically, numerically it is many, as each individual person has their own passive intellect.

== In Islamic philosophy ==
Passive intellect is identical with Aql bi al-Quwwah in Islamic philosophy. Aql bi-al-Quwwah, defined as reason, could abstract the forms of entities with which it is finally identified. For Farabi, the potential intellect becomes actual by receiving the form of matter. In other words, Aql al-Hayulani tries to separate the forms of existents from their matter. The form become identical with Aql. Farabi also recognised the potential intellect as part of soul.

== Hegel ==
The soul is no separate immaterial entity. Wherever there is Nature, the soul is its universal immaterialism, its simple 'ideal' life. Soul is the substance or 'absolute' basis of all the particularizing and individualizing of mind: it is in the soul that mind finds the material on which its character is wrought, and the soul remains the pervading, identical ideality of it all. But as it is still conceived thus abstractly, the soul is only the sleep of mind - the passive nous of Aristotle, which is potentially all things.

— G.W.F. Hegel, Philosophy of Mind/Spirit, Part Three of The Encyclopaedia of Philosophical Sciences (1830), § 389, trans. William Wallace (Oxford: Oxford University Press, 1971), p.29

Recalling the tradition inaugurated by Al-Farabi and then by Averroes' monopsychism, Hegel also stated that passive intellect is the universal soul, the universal substance, immaterial, separate from the individual and formless ("is potentially all things") that is able to particularise and realise the Spirit in any individual subject. While this individuation is taking place, it always remains itself, that is to say immaterial and universal, without any mixture with body's matter: in other words, according to Moses Narboni, the unique intellect "is with the body, but not in the body."

== Sources ==
- Chase, Michael (2008). "Thomas Aquinas and alFäräbï". In Newton, Lloyd A. (ed.). Medieval Commentaries on Aristotle's Categories. BRILL. ISBN 978-90-04-16752-0.
- Craig, Edward (1998). Routledge Encyclopedia of Philosophy. Taylor & Francis. ISBN 9780415169172. GGKEY:63C446DRRDG.
- Commentarium magnum in Aristotelis De anima libros, ed. Crawford, Cambridge (Mass.) 1953: Latin translation of Averroes' long commentary on the De Anima
- Averroes (tr. Alain de Libera), L'intelligence et la pensée, Paris 1998: French translation of Averroes' long commentary on book 3 of the De Anima
