= Intelligibility =

Intelligibility may refer to:

- Mutual intelligibility, in linguistics
- Intelligibility (communication)
- Intelligibility (philosophy)

== See also ==
- Immaterialism, in philosophy
- Incorporeality
