= Materialism and Christianity =

Materiality-affirming Christian theology

Some Christian theologians embrace a holistic combination of Christian theology with some ideas of (ontological) materialism, a belief that matter is a fundamental substance of the world and that mental phenomena result from matter.

== Historical background ==
Throughout history, Christian thought has struggled with the ideas of flesh, world, and spirit, and their interplay in each person's salvation. As Cardinal Joseph Ratzinger (Pope Benedict XVI) said in What It Means To Be a Christian (2006), "Christian theology... in the course of time turned the kingdom of God into a kingdom of heaven that is beyond this mortal life; the well-being of men became a salvation of souls, which again comes to pass beyond this life, after death."

This tendency of spiritualization, Ratzinger said, is not the message of Jesus Christ. "For what is sublime in this message," he stated, "is precisely that the Lord was talking not just about another life, not just about men's souls, but was addressing the body, the whole man, in his embodied form, with his involvement in history and society; that he promised the kingdom of God to the man who lives bodily with other men in this history."

Christian materialism is a widely discussed position in contemporary analytic philosophy of religion, defended by figures such as Peter van Inwagen and Trenton Merricks.

Pope John Paul II's Theology of the Body lectures asserted that "The body, and it alone, is capable of making visible ... the spiritual and divine."

Christopher West, in reviewing the words of Pope John Paul II, asserted

The theology of the body is a clarion call for the Church not to become more “spiritual,” but to become more incarnational. It is a call to allow the Word of the Gospel to penetrate our flesh and bones.

Archbishop William Temple has remarked that Christianity is "the most avowedly materialist of all the great religions."

=== Rejection of 'materialism' ===
According to Constantin Gutberlet writing in Catholic Encyclopedia (1911), "materialism", defined as "a philosophical system which regards matter as the only reality in the world…denies the existence of God and the soul." In this view, materialism could be perceived incompatible with world religions that ascribe existence to immaterial objects. Materialism may be conflated with atheism; according to Friedrich A. Lange (1892), "Diderot has not always in the Encyclopædia expressed his own individual opinion, but it is just as true that at its commencement he had not yet got as far as Atheism and Materialism."

Mary Baker Eddy, the founder of the Christian Science movement, denied the existence of matter on the basis of the allness of Mind (which she regarded as a synonym for God).

=== Josemaría Escrivá and Opus Dei ===
The most visible use of the term is found in the writings of Josemaría Escrivá, a Spanish Catholic saint of the twentieth century, who said that all temporal realities have a sanctifying power and Christians can find God in the most ordinary material things. As such, it is associated with the Roman Catholic prelature of Opus Dei which Escriva founded. It is an organization which teaches that everyone is called to holiness and that ordinary life, even the most material activity, is a path to sanctity.

Escriva criticized those who "have tried to present the Christian way of life as something exclusively spiritual, proper to pure, extraordinary people, who remain aloof from the contemptible things of this world, or at most tolerate them as something necessarily attached to the spirit, while we live on this earth. When things are seen in this way, churches become the setting par excellence of the Christian life. And being a Christian means going to church, taking part in sacred ceremonies, being taken up with ecclesiastical matters, in a kind of segregated world, which is considered to be the ante-chamber of heaven, while the ordinary world follows its own separate path."

Instead, he affirmed the "high value of the material." According to him, "Authentic Christianity which professes the resurrection of all flesh, has always quite logically opposed 'dis-incarnation,' without fear of being judged materialistic. We can, therefore, rightfully speak of a Christian materialism, which is boldly opposed to those materialisms which are blind to the spirit." (Italics and emphasis added)

In an address to a theological symposium, Holiness and the World, which studied the teachings of Josemaria Escriva, John Paul II referred to one of his homilies:

There is nothing that is outside of the concern of Christ. Speaking with theological rigor ... one cannot say that there are things — good, noble or even indifferent — which are exclusively profane; for the Word of God has made his dwelling the sons of men, he was hungry and thirsty, worked with his hands, knew friendship and obedience, experienced sorrow and death.

In connection with this quote, John Paul II said that the Catholic Church today is "conscious of serving a redemption that concerns every aspect of human existence," an awareness which was "prepared by a gradual intellectual and spiritual development." He also said that the message of Escriva, which has contributed in this direction, stems "from a unique grasp of the radiant, universal force of the Redeemer's grace." He later called Escriva "one of Christianity's great witnesses."

== Relation with "materialistic values" ==
The term "materialistic" is also used pejoratively in the sense of "economic" materialism.

Rowan Williams, in a lecture to Welsh Centre for International Affairs, asserts that

[...]so far from being a materialist culture, we are a culture that is resentful about material reality, hungry for anything and everything that distances us from the constraints of being a physical animal subject to temporal processes, to uncontrollable changes and to sheer accident.

Prosperity theology which has been criticised as "materialistic". Prosperity theology in the eyes of Simon Coleman (anthropologist) and Kate Bowler (2013) is influenced by New Thought. New Thought, to William James, has roots in idealist rather than materialist ontology.

The economic definition of Materialism defined by the Merriam Webster Dictionary as a "preoccupation with or stress upon material rather than intellectual or spiritual things" According to historian Brad S. Gregory the Dutch found that religious toleration was good for business in the seventeenth-century, a crucial part for Christianity's disembedding from traditional values of the dangers of "avarice and the pursuit of wealth", that were declared by previous religious leaders. With the passing of time desires for more material things turned from sinful seeking of personal wants at the cost of ignoring the most basic needs of others to an unavoidable aspect of human nature and therefore acceptable.

Historian Chris Hann, declared "assertive materialism" was used as a method of conversion to lure in potential Christians with the promise of wealth and success given to them by God.

== American Christian materialism, consumerism, and capitalism ==
=== 20th century America ===
According to historian Lizabeth Cohen, American prosperity after World War II was catalyzed by several economic factors and created an American landscape built on the ideals of consuming a certain desired lifestyle. This lifestyle change meant a dramatic increase in the quantity of goods bought, but also meant a dramatic rise in goods produced to meet the current consumption pace. Business executives designed this feature of the new economy according to historian Bethany Moreton, author of To Serve God and Wal-Mart. Lizabeth Cohen focuses on how New Age marketing in the 1970s aimed to identify consumer groups based on their shared ways of life, then targeted the group with consumer goods to fit their lifestyles.

=== The spectacle of the megachurch ===
Beginning in the 1990s Prosperity megachurches pioneered a new form of worship music that mimicked popular rock music while changing the lyrics to reflect more traditional Christian music, taking advantage of their scale to turn Christian worship music into a spectacle to be consumed. This orchestrated experience focused on making worship music more consumable, now being performed live, with flashing lights, larger speakers, and added performance. This innovation in worship music led to a surge in the consumption of music outside of the church setting. The megachurch justified its own being as being more abundant with everything including God's blessings. From the outside looking in, its grandiose scale and performances made it the perfect marketplace to sell the Christian life to consumers.

== List ==
=== Christianity and dialectical materialism ===
- Denys Turner, Catholic theologian and Marxist who remarked that the hylomorphism of Thomas Aquinas had materialistic traits and asserted "strong compatibility" between Marxist materialism and Christian Theism. Unlike many contemporary materialists, he uses 'materialism' to argue for, rather than against, the resurrection and immortality of the body. He is an Opus Dei member.
- Y. T. Wu and much of Sino-Christian theology
- Marxism and religion#Communism and Christianity
- Liberation theology, as claimed by Pope Benedict XVI
- Slavoj Žižek

=== Ontological-materialist Christian philosophers espousing mechanism or mechanical philosophy ===
- Thomas Hobbes
- Pierre Gassendi

=== Non-Nicene writers ===
- Joseph Priestley and Dissent
- Joseph Smith, the founder of the Latter Day Saint movement, taught: "There is no such thing as immaterial matter. All spirit is matter, but it is more fine or pure, and can only be discerned by purer eyes; We cannot see it; but when our bodies are purified we shall see that it is all matter." This spirit element is believed to always have existed and to be co-eternal with God.
- Parley P. Pratt stated that "God, the father is material. Jesus Christ is material. Angels are material. Spirits are material. Men are material. The universe is material ... Nothing exists which is not material."

== See also ==
- Christian mortalism
- Christoplatonism
- Holism
- Hylotheism
- Impanation
- Christian humanism
- William Montgomery Brown
- Teleomechanistic idealism (Hermann Lotze)
