= Philosophy of matter =

Branch of philosophy relating to the material world

Philosophy of matter is the branch of philosophy concerned with issues surrounding the ontology, epistemology and character of matter and the material world. The word matter is derived from the Latin word materia, meaning 'wood', or 'timber', in the sense 'material', as distinct from 'mind' or 'form'. The image of wood came to Latin as a calque from the ancient Greek philosophical usage of hyle (ὕλη).

== Ancient Greek philosophy ==
In ancient Greek philosophy, arche (ἀρχή) is the beginning or the first principle of the world. Thales of Miletus claimed that the first principle of all things is water. His theory was supported by the observation of moisture throughout the world and coincided with his theory that the earth floated on water.

Thales's pupil and successor, Anaximander, proposed a different theory. Anaximander noted that water could not be the arche because it could not give rise to its opposite, fire. Anaximander claimed that none of the elements (earth, fire, air, water) could be arche for the same reason. Instead, he proposed the existence of the apeiron, an indefinite substance from which all things are born and to which all things will return.

Anaximenes, Anaximander's pupil, advanced yet another theory. He returns to the elemental theory, but this time posits air, rather than water, as the arche. Anaximenes suggests that all is made from air through either rarefication or condensation (thinning or thickening). Rarefied, air becomes fire; condensed, it becomes first wind, then cloud, water, earth, and stone in order.

Pythagoras of Samos, a mathematician, mystic, and scientist, taught that number, rather than matter, constitutes the true nature of things. He seems to have influenced Socrates' ideal form.

Heraclitus held that all is flux. In such a system there is no need for or possibility of matter. Leucippus held that there exist indivisible particles, atoms, underlying existence.

Empedocles held that there are four elements, from which things are derived, Earth, Water, Fire and Air. Some added a fifth element, the Aether, from which the heavens were derived. Socrates accepted (or at least did not reject) that list, as seen from Plato's Timaeus, which identified the five elements with the Platonic solids. Earth was associated with the cube, air with the octahedron, water with the icosahedron, fire with the tetrahedron, and the heavens with the dodecahedron.

Aristotle, rejecting the atomic theory, instead analyzed the four terrestrial elements with the sense of touch:

- Air is primarily wet and secondarily hot.
- Fire is primarily hot and secondarily dry.
- Earth is primarily dry and secondarily cold.
- Water is primarily cold and secondarily wet.

He developed Socrates' ideal form into a theory which aimed to explain existence through the composition of matter and form. He conceived of matter as a passive possibility that something might be actualized by an active principle, a substantial form, giving it real existence. The theory of matter and form came to be known as Hylomorphism.

Aristotle's ideas had little impact on the ancient world. The rise of Stoicism represented the return to earlier ideas. Their categories were an attempt to explain all existence without reference to anything incorporeal.

Philo held that matter is the basis of evil.

Plotinus revived the ideas of Plato and Aristotle.

== Medieval philosophy ==
Many Christians, such as Augustine of Hippo, accepted Plotinus as the greatest of the pagan philosophers. Parts of Plotinus' Six Enneads were translated into Arabic as the Theology of Aristotle, leading to a blossoming of Aristotle's philosophy in the Islamic world. This Islamic version of Aristotle eventually reached the University of Paris and the attention of scholastic philosophy, and the work of Thomas Aquinas.

== Modern science ==
From a philosophical viewpoint, the term "matter" still is used to distinguish the material aspects of the universe from those of the spirit. The rise of modern chemistry and physics marked a return to the atomic theories of Leucippus. Quantum physics and special relativity however, complicate the picture through the identification of matter and energy, particle and wave.

== See also ==
- Atomism
- Hylomorphism
- Materialism
- Mereological essentialism
- Substantial form
