= Aql bi al-Fi'l =

Category of intellect in Islamic philosophy

Aql bi al-Fi'l (عقل بالفعل) is a kind of intellect in Islamic philosophy. This level deals with readiness of the soul for acquiring the forms without receiving them again.

== Historical background ==
Al-Kindi pointed out to a kind of intellect which could reach from the state of potentiality, to the state of actuality. Farabi pointed out that the first level of actualization of intellect is the potential intellect. The second stage is Aql bi al-Fi'l or actual intellect. The actual intellect reflects upon itself. In other words, when intellect with acquired forms and categories reflects upon itself, this action is called actual intellect. Groff classify the actual intellect as third. meanwhile Farabi used the term Aql bi al-Fi'l for intellect in full exercise of its powers. Iji, known theologian, referred to the actual intellect versus potential intellect. It seems that the term Aql bi al-Fi'l in Avicenna is comparable with Al-Ruh Al-Aqli for Al-Ghazali.

== Concept ==
If the intellect acquired its knowledge so that it could access them any time it wants then the intellect is called actual intellect. In this degree, Aql is in act which is compared to the absolute potency of the material Aql and has a first form of knowledge. For Farabi, the potential intellect becomes the actual. In fact the most important task of the actual intellect is to acquire secondary intelligible from primary intelligible and be ready to employ them all at any time. This stage has similarities with Aql bi al-Malaka but its task is much greater. This intellect also is the second perfection of intellect. However, this kind of intellect allows to human free themselves from illusion and errors.

== See also ==
- Aql bi al-Quwwah
- 'Aql
