= Robert C. Koons =

American philosopher (born 1957)

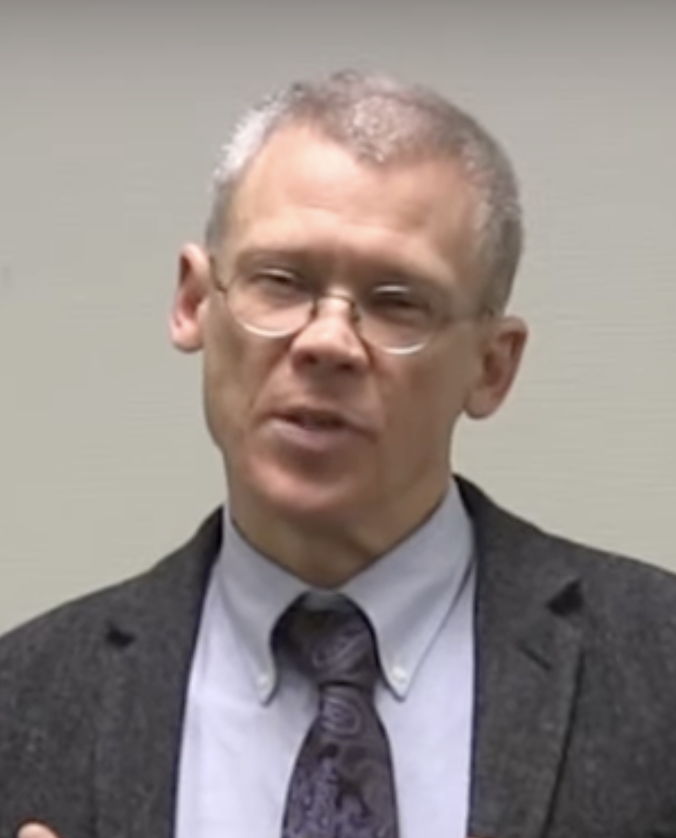
- Koons in 2014
- Born: Robert Charles Koons; February 22, 1957 (age 69); Saint Paul, Minnesota, U.S.
- Title: Professor

Education
- Education: Michigan State University (BA); University of Oxford (MA); University of California, Los Angeles (PhD)

Philosophical work
- Era: Contemporary philosophy
- Region: Western philosophy
- School: Analytic philosophy Thomism; Analytical Thomism
- Institutions: University of Texas at Austin
- Main interests: Metaphysics; Neo-Aristotelianism
- Website: https://robkoons.net

Robert Charles "Rob" Koons (/kuːnz/; born February 22, 1957) is an American philosopher. He is a professor of philosophy at the University of Texas at Austin, noted for his contribution to metaphysics and philosophical logic. Koons has also advocated for academic freedom and courses on Western civilization.

== Early life and career ==
Robert Charles Koons was born on February 22, 1957, in Saint Paul, Minnesota, to Charles Bruce and Margaret Constance (Suter) Koons. He earned a B.A. in philosophy from Michigan State University in 1979, an M.A. from the University of Oxford in 1981, and a Ph.D. in philosophy from the University of California, Los Angeles, in 1987.

Koons was an assistant professor of philosophy at the University of Texas, Austin, from 1987-1993, then an associate professor from 1993-2000, and a professor since 2000.

Koons was faculty affiliate Christian Leadership Ministries, Dallas, 1987. Member American Philosophical Association, Association Symbolic Logic, Society Christian Philosophers. He was named Claude R. Lambe fellow, Institute Humane Studies, 1986; recipient Gustave O. Arlt prize in humanities Council Graduate Schools, 1992; Richard Weaver fellow Intercollegiate Studies Institute, 1985, Danforth fellow, Danforth Foundation, 1979, Marshall scholar, 1979.

== Educational activities ==
Koons has been involved in debates over issues of academic freedom and has advocated for college exit exams as he believes the measures used currently don't measure how well students learn. He led an effort at UT to create a concentration in Western Civilization and American Institutions. The goal of the program was to promote the study of the "Great Books" of the Western tradition, especially the American founding. Koons stated that the program transcended political differences.

Koons is a national Senator of Phi Beta Kappa society, as well as a member of the executive committee of the Society of Christian Philosophers.

== Books ==
=== Authored ===
- Paradoxes of Belief and Strategic Rationality (Cambridge University Press, 1992)
- Logic, Sets and Functions (with Daniel Bonevac and Nicholas M. Asher) (Kendall Hunt Publishing Company, 1999)
- Realism Regained: An Exact Theory of Causation, Teleology, and the Mind (Oxford University Press, 2000)
- Metaphysics: The Fundamentals (with Timothy H. Pickavance) (Wiley-Blackwell, 2015)
- The Atlas of Reality: A Complete Guide to Metaphysics (with Timothy H. Pickavance) (Wiley-Blackwell, 2017)
- Is St. Thomas's Aristotelian Philosophy of Nature Obsolete? (St. Augustine's Press, 2022)
- The Five Ways: A Fresh Interpretation and Defense of Aquinas’s Natural Theology (with Daniel A. Bonevac) (Word on Fire, 2026)

=== Edited ===
- The Waning of Materialism: New Essays in the Philosophy of Mind (with George Bealer) (Oxford University Press, 2010)
- Neo-Aristotelian Perspectives on Contemporary Science (with William M. R. Simpson and Nicholas J. Teh) (Routledge, 2018)
- Neo-Aristotelian Metaphysics and the Theology of Nature (with William M. R. Simpson and James Ort) (Routledge, 2022)
