= Daniel Bonevac =

American philosopher

- Born: Daniel Albert Bonevac; 1955 (age 70–71)
- Occupations: Professor; philosopher

Education
- Education: Haverford College (BA); University of Pittsburgh (MA, PhD)
- Thesis: Ontological Reduction and Abstract Entities (1980)

Philosophical work
- Institutions: University of Texas at Austin
- Main interests: Metaphysics; ethics; Eastern philosophy; logic

Daniel Albert Bonevac (born 1955) is a professor of philosophy at the University of Texas at Austin. His areas of interest are metaphysics, philosophical logic, ethics, and Eastern philosophy.

== Early life ==
Bonevac is from Baldwin, Pennsylvania, a borough near Pittsburgh. His family moved to Richmond, Virginia when he was eight-years-old and later moved to West Hartford, Connecticut. He was raised Calvinist and attended a Presbyterian church in his youth, and he met his wife in high school.

== Education and career ==
Bonevac majored in philosophy at Haverford College, graduating in 1975. He received a master's degree in philosophy from the University of Pittsburgh in 1977 and a Ph.D. in 1980. His doctoral dissertation was "Ontological Reduction and Abstract Entities".

He joined the University of Texas at Austin as an assistant professor of philosophy in 1980, chaired the department from 1991 to 2001, and became full professor there in 1992.

== Politics ==
In autumn 2016, Bonevac joined 145 other scholars and writers in declaring support for Donald Trump for president. He was one of four philosophy professors in the United States, including fellow UT philosophy professor Robert Koons, to be included on the list. Bonevac's support is because he believes Trump is correct in pointing out the "dangers of a globalist attitude" to U.S. interests and because of Trump's opposition to the administrative state.

On May 15, 2024, Bonevac and another UT-Austin professor filed a lawsuit in federal court demanding the right to fail students if they miss class for abortion, and to refuse to hire teaching assistants who have used mail-order abortion medicine. In his statement on the issue, Bonevac stated that he has "no intention of complying with" new Title IX regulations prohibiting discrimination based on gender identity and requiring accommodation for absences caused by abortion, will not use students' preferred pronouns, and will not allow "cross-dressing" teaching assistants.

== Books ==
- Reduction in the Abstract Sciences (Hackett Publishing Company, 1982)
- The Art and Science of Logic (Mayfield Publishing Company, 1990)
- Beyond the Western Tradition: Readings in Moral and Political Philosophy (edited with William Boon and Stephen H. Phillips) (Mayfield Publishing Company, 1992)
- Understanding Non-Western Philosophy: Introductory Readings (edited with Stephen H. Phillips) (Mayfield Publishing Company, 1993)
- Logic, Sets and Functions (with Robert C. Koons and Nicholas M. Asher) (Kendall Hunt Publishing Company, 1999)
- Simple Logic (Harcourt Brace College Publishers, 1999)
- Worldly Wisdom: A Multicultural Introduction to Philosophy (McGraw-Hill Higher Education, 2001)
- Deduction: Introductory Symbolic Logic, 2nd edition (Wiley-Blackwell, 2002)
- Introduction to World Philosophy: A Multicultural Reader (edited with Stephen H. Phillips) (Oxford University Press, 2009)
- Today's Moral Issues: Classic and Contemporary Perspectives, 7th edition (McGraw Hill Education, 2012)
- Ideas of the Twentieth Century (University of Texas Press, 2013)
- Historical Dictionary of Ethics, 2nd edition (Rowman & Littlefield, 2023)
- The Five Ways: A Fresh Interpretation and Defense of Aquinas’s Natural Theology (with Robert C. Koons) (Word on Fire, 2026)

Reduction in the Abstract Sciences won the Johnsonian Prize for the best "first book" in philosophy from The Journal of Philosophy
