= Active intellect =

Concept in classical and Medieval philosophy

In medieval philosophy, the active intellect (Latin: intellectus agens; also translated as agent intellect, active intelligence, active reason, or productive intellect) is the formal (morphe) aspect of the intellect (nous), according to the Aristotelian theory of hylomorphism. The nature of the active intellect was a major theme of late classical and medieval philosophy. Various thinkers sought to reconcile their commitment to Aristotle's account of the body and soul to their own theological commitments. At stake in particular was in what way Aristotle's account of an incorporeal soul might contribute to understanding of deity and creation.

== Aristotle's conception ==
The idea is first encountered in two of Aristotle's works.

A passage in De Anima, Book III explains "how the human intellect passes from its original state, in which it does not think, to a subsequent state, in which it does." He inferred that the energeia/dynamis distinction must also exist in the soul itself. Aristotle distinguished two separable types of intellect or nous which he believed were both necessary in order to explain human thinking. What modern scholars call the "passive intellect" is material and destructible and it receives the intelligible forms of things. It is acted upon. In contrast, the active intellect is what acts upon the passive intellect. It is required to make potential knowledge into actual knowledge, in the same way that light makes potential colors into actual colors. Aristotle describes this active intellect as something separate, everlasting, unchanging, and immaterial. It is the passive or material intellect where human thinking and remembering happens, because these involve change.

Another passage which is traditionally read together with the De Anima passage is in Metaphysics, Book XII, Ch. 7–10. Aristotle again distinguishes between the active and passive intellects, but this time he equates the active intellect with the "unmoved mover" and God. He explains that when people have real knowledge, their thinking is, for a time receiving, or partaking of, this energeia of the nous (active intellect).

== Interpretations ==
Sachs comments that the nature of the active intellect was "the source of a massive amount of commentary and of fierce disagreement"; elsewhere, chapter 5 of De Anima has been referred to as "the most intensely studied sentences in the history of philosophy." As Davidson remarks:

Just what Aristotle meant by potential intellect and active intellect – terms not even explicit in the De Anima and at best implied – and just how he understood the interaction between them remains moot. Students of the history of philosophy continue to debate Aristotle's intent, particularly the question whether he considered the active intellect to be an aspect of the human soul or an entity existing independently of man.

Alexander of Aphrodisias regarded the active intellect as a power external to the human mind, going so far as to identify it with God. The reason for positing a single external Agent Intellect is that all (rational) human beings are considered by Aristotelians to possess or have access to a fixed and stable set of concepts, a unified correct knowledge of the universe. The only way that all human minds could possess the same correct knowledge is if they all had access to some central knowledge store, as terminals might have access to a mainframe computer (Kraemer 2003). This mainframe is the Agent Intellect, the "mind" of the universe, which makes all other cognition possible.

Al-Farabi and Avicenna and Maimonides, agreed with the "external" interpretation of active intellect, and held that the active intellect was the lowest of the ten emanations descending through the celestial spheres. Maimonides cited it in his definition of prophecy where:

Prophecy is, in truth and reality, an emanation sent forth by the Divine Being through the medium of the Active Intellect, in the first instance to man's rational faculty, and then to his imaginative faculty.

The more strict Aristotelians, Avempace and Averroes, wrote about how one could conjoin oneself with the active intellect, thus attaining a kind of philosophical enlightenment. In Medieval and Renaissance Europe some thinkers, such as Siger of Brabant, adopted the interpretation of Averroes on every point, as did the later school of "Paduan Averroists".

Thomas Aquinas elaborated on Aristotle's distinction between the active intellect and passive intellect in his Disputed Questions on the Soul and his commentary on Aristotle's De Anima, arguing, against Averroes, that the active intellect is part of the individual human personality. In his Summa Theologica, Aquinas states that "according to the teaching of our Faith, this separated intellect is God Himself, who is the creator of the soul and in whom alone the soul is beatified." Citing Gregory of Nyssa, he said "man has intellective understanding along with the angels" which are called 'minds' and 'intellects' because they have no other power than the intellective power and the will (Question 79, Article 1). A third school, of "Alexandrists", rejected the argument linking the active intellect to the immortality of the soul, while hastening to add that they still believed in immortality as a matter of religious faith. (See Pietro Pomponazzi; Cesare Cremonini.)

== See also ==
- Aristotelianism
- John Philoponus

== Sources ==
- Kraemer, Joel L. (2003), "The Islamic context of medieval Jewish philosophy", in Frank, Daniel H.; Leaman, Oliver (eds.), The Cambridge Companion to Medieval Jewish Philosophy, Cambridge: Cambridge University Press, pp. 38–68, ISBN 978-0-521-65207-0
- Commentarium magnum in Aristotelis De anima libros, ed. Crawford, Cambridge (Mass.) 1953: Latin translation of Averroes' long commentary on the De Anima
- Walter Burley, Commentarium in Aristotelis De Anima L.III Critical Edition and Palaeography transcription by Mario Tonelotto
- Averroes (tr. Alain de Libera), L'intelligence et la pensée, Paris 1998: French translation of Averroes' long commentary on book 3 of the De Anima
- Essays on Aristotle's De Anima, ed. Nussbaum and Rorty: Oxford 1992
- Juan Fernando Sellés (2012), El intelecto agente y los filósofos. Venturas y desventuras del supremo hallazgo aristotélico sobre el hombre, Tomo I (Siglos IV a.C. – XV), EUNSA, Pamplona, p. 650.
