= History of Islamic Philosophy =

Collection of essays on Islamic philosophy

History of Islamic Philosophy, first published in 1996 with, is a collection of essays by various authorities on Islam in the Routledge series History of World Philosophies and is edited by Seyyed Hossein Nasr of George Washington University and Oliver Leaman of Liverpool John Moores University. The book has been well reviewed (the book jacket carries positive praise from the London University School of Oriental and African Studies).

In over 1200 pages the book explores many varieties of Islamic thought as follows:

- Section I - the concept of philosophy in Islam, the background of Islamic philosophy, Sunni theology, Shia theology, Ismaili philosophy, and Islamic humanism.
- Section II - Early Islamic philosophers: Al-Kindi, Al-Farabi, Al-Razi, Al Amiri, Ikhwan al-Safa, Ibn Sina, Ibn Miskawayh, and Al-Ghazali.
- Section III - Islamic philosophers in the Western lands of Islam: Ibn Masarrah, Ibn Bajjah, Ibn Tufayl, Ibn Rushd, Ibn Sabin, and Ibn Khaldun.
- Section IV - Islam and the mystics: Ayn-al-Qudat Hamadani, Suhrawardi, The Illuminationist philosophy, and Ibn Arabi.
- Section V - Later Islamic philosophers and philosophies: al-Tusi, Isfahan School, Mir Damad, Mulla Sadra, Shah Waliullah.
- Section VI - Jewish philosophical tradition in the Islamic world: Saadia Gaon, Ibn Gabirol, Judah Halevi, Maimonides, and Levi ben Gershom.
- Section VII - metaphysics, logic, epistemology, political philosophy, literature, language, science, mysticism, ethics, aesthetics, and law.
- Section VIII - the interpretation of Islam in Medieval Europe and the Modern West.
- Section IX - Islamic philosophy in the modern Islamic world in countries like: Persia, India, Pakistan, the Arab world, Egypt, Turkey, and Southeast Asia.
- Section X - How Islamic philosophy is explained in the West in terms of Orientalism. The contribution of Henry Corbin and Islamic philosophy in Russia and the Soviet Union.
