= George Bealer =

American philosopher (1944–2025)

- Born: 1944
- Died: January 2025 (aged 80–81)

Education
- Education: University of California, Berkeley (PhD)

Philosophical work
- Era: 21st-century philosophy
- Region: Western philosophy
- Institutions: Yale University
- Main interests: philosophy of mind, epistemology
- Notable ideas: The Autonomy of Philosophy

George Bealer (1944–January 2025) was an American philosopher and Professor Emeritus of Philosophy at Yale University. He is known for his works on philosophy of mind, philosophy of language, epistemology, and logic. Bealer is particularly well known for his work on the nature of the a priori and philosophical intuitions, where he defended the reliability of intuitions as a source of evidence in philosophical inquiry.

He was the author of Quality and Concept (Clarendon Press, 1983), which developed a unified theory of properties, relations, and propositions. He also co-edited The Waning of Materialism (2010) with Robert C. Koons, a volume addressing contemporary philosophical debates on the nature of mind and materialism.

Bealer held academic positions at the University of Texas at Austin, the University of Colorado Boulder, and Reed College before joining Yale University. He completed his PhD at the University of California, Berkeley.

== Selected publications ==
- Bealer, George (1979). Theories of properties, relations, and propositions. Journal of Philosophy 76 (11):634-648.
- — (1983). Quality and Concept (Clarendon Press, 1983)
- — (1983). Completeness in the theory of properties, relations, and propositions. Journal of Symbolic Logic 48 (2):415-426.
- — (1987). The philosophical limits of scientific essentialism. Philosophical Perspectives 1:289-365.
- — (1992). The incoherence of empiricism. Aristotelian Society Supplementary Volume 66 (1):99-138.
- — (1998). A theory of concepts and concepts possession. Philosophical Issues 9:261-301.
- — (1999). A Theory of the a Priori. Philosophical Perspectives 13:29-55.
- — (2002). Modal Epistemology and the Rationalist Renaissance. In Tamar Gendler & John Hawthorne (eds.), Conceivability and Possibility. New York: Oxford University Press. pp. 71–125.
- — (2004). The origins of modal error. Dialectica 58 (1):11-42.
- — (2006). A definition of necessity. Philosophical Perspectives 20 (1):17–39.
