= Substantial form =

Philosophical concept

Substantial form is a central philosophical concept in Aristotelianism and, afterwards, in Scholasticism. The form is the idea, existent or embodied in a being, that completes or actualizes the potentiality latent in the matter composing the being itself. For Aristotle, in fact, matter is the basis of all that exists; it comprises the potentiality of everything, but of itself is not actually anything. A determinate thing only comes into being when the potentiality in matter is converted into actuality; this is achieved by the substantial form. It is substantial because it is the principle by which a material kind of thing is recognised as such.

This concept was designed by Aristotle to explain several phenomena considered perplexing in the ancient world. One was how physical things can exist as certain types of intelligible things, e.g., Argos and Garmr are both dogs despite being very different because they have the same type of substantial form: it is the substantial form that makes the physical thing intelligible as a particular kind of thing; in other words, such is the Aristotelian solution of the problem of universals. Another one was how the activities of physical things can transcend the limitations of matter to different degrees (for Aristotle, matter was considered unable of any kind of self-organization): plants through their vegetative substantial form transcend the capacities of inanimate matter via growth and nutritive activities; animals through their sentient substantial form by sensation, perception and emotions; and humans by their rational substantial form, so making them "rational animals". A third one was how one physical thing can change into another, e.g. the tiger that eats an antilope not only ends the ability of the antilope's substantial forms to continue animating its prime matter but also enables that same prime matter to become absorbed or animated by the tiger's substantial form. For Aristotle, prime matter is the ultimate principle of physicality and has the potency to being activated by substantial forms into physical entities. Without this potency of prime matter, in Aristotle's opinion, change would either be impossible or would require matter to be destroyed and created rather than altered.

Aristotle's doctrine of substantial form animating prime matter differs from Plato's theory of forms in several ways. Unlike substantial forms, Platonic forms or ideas exist as exemplars in the invisible world and are imposed by a supreme god (Demiurge in some translations of the Timaeus) upon chaotic matter. Physical things thus only participate to some degree in the perfection of Plato's paradigmatic Forms. Aristotle, on the other hand, holds that substantial forms actualize the potency of prime matter made receptive by agents of change. The chick's substantial form actualizes prime matter that has been individualized into being a receptive potency for the chicken's substantial form by the hen and the rooster.

While the concept of substantial forms dominates ancient Greek philosophy and medieval philosophy, it fell out of favor in modern philosophy. Modern philosophy was changed by the discovery of nature's mathematical and mechanical laws. So, the idea of substantial forms was abandoned for a mechanical, or "bottom-up" theory of organization. Each substance being in its nature fixed and determined, nothing is farther from the spirit of Aristotelianism or Scholasticism than a theory of evolution which would regard even the essences of things as products of change. However, such mechanistic treatments have been criticized by proponents of Neo-Scholasticism for merely denying the existence of certain kinds of substantial forms in favor of others (for example that of atoms) and not denying substantial forms as such.

== Articulation ==
=== Aristotelian forms ===
Responding to Plato's Theory of Forms, Aristotle was the first to distinguish between matter (hyle) and form (morphe). For Aristotle, matter is the undifferentiated primal element: it is rather that from which things develop than a thing-in-itself. The development of particular things from this germinal matter consists in differentiation, the acquiring of particular forms of which the knowable universe consists (cf. Formal cause). The perfection of the form of a thing is its entelechy in virtue of which it attains its fullest realization of function (De anima, ii. 2). Thus, the entelechy of the body is the soul. The origin of the differentiation process is to be sought in a prime mover, i.e. pure form entirely separate from all matter, eternal, unchangeable, operating not by its own activity but by the impulse which its own absolute existence excites in matter.

=== Early adoption ===
Aristotelian forms appear in medieval philosophy.

Medieval theologians, newly exposed to Aristotle's philosophy, applied hylomorphism to Christianity, such as to the transubstantiation of the Eucharist's bread and wine to the body and blood of Jesus. Theologians such as Duns Scotus developed Christian applications of hylomorphism.

The Aristotelian conception of form was adopted by the Scholastics, to whom, however, its origin in the observation of the physical universe was an entirely foreign idea. The most remarkable adaptation is probably that of Aquinas, who distinguished the spiritual world with its subsistent forms (formae separatae) from the material with its inherent forms which exist only in combination with matter.

== Criticism ==
Descartes, referring to substantial forms, says:

They were introduced by philosophers solely to account for the proper action of natural things, of which they were supposed to be the principles and bases ... But no natural action at all can be explained by these substantial forms, since their defenders admit that they are occult, and that they do not understand them themselves. If they say that some action proceeds from a substantial form, it is as if they said it proceeds from something they do not understand; which explains nothing.

John Locke criticised 'substantial forms' as ill-defined, stating that they "signify nothing" and that the supposition that "the same precise and internal constitution goes always with the same specific name, makes men forward to take those names for the representatives of those real essences".

Isaac Newton in his Principia situates himself within the contemporary scientific movement which had "omit[ed] substantial forms and the occult qualities" and instead endeavoured to explain the world by empirical investigation and outlining of empirical regularities.

== Response to criticism ==
Leibniz made efforts to return to forms. Substantial forms, in the strictest sense for Leibniz, are primitive active forces and are required for his metaphysics. In the Discourse on Metaphysics (§10):

[...] the belief in substantial forms has a certain basis in fact, but that these forms effect no changes in the phenomena and must not be employed for the explanation of particular events.
