= Aql bi al-Quwwah =

Aql bi al-Quwwah (Arabic: عقل بالقوة) is the first stage of the intellect's hierarchy in Islamic philosophy. This kind of reason is also called the potential or material intellect. In philosophy thus kind of intellect also called as passive intellect.

== Historical background ==
Aristotle, in his "On the Soul" believes that human intellect at first is just a receptive faculty. This receptive capacity becomes actual by receiving the forms of things. It seems that Farabi for the first time in his Treatise on Reason (Risala fi'l-Aql) renders the hierarchy of intellect following his theory of intellection. There Farabi tried to distinguish six meanings of Aql. The fifth intellect among them is very important. Farabi took notice to elaborate this kind of Aql in detail. Fifth reason itself divided to four stages, where potential Aql is the first stage. Other stages include actual intellect, acquired intellect and finally active intellect.

== Concept ==
Aql bi al-Quwwah is designating reason as that which could abstract the forms of entities with which it is finally identified. For Farabi, the potential intellect could become actual by receiving the form from matter. In other words, Aql al-Hayulani tried to separate the forms of existence from their matters in such a way that there is no material characteristics along with forms such as material circumstances. The forms receive by potential Aql unite with it, in other words they become identical. Farabi also claim the potential intellect as part of the soul.

== Function in cognition ==
According to Avicenna's understanding of intellectual abstraction, the potential Aql functions as possible intellect. This stage begins with absolute potency. Avicenna, following Farabi, claimed that the intellect of human beings becomes perfect due to a transcendent link with eternal intellection. Avicenna believes that the legislator who has potential intellect receives the intelligible forms from agent intellect in political philosophy. Averroes also believed that the potential intellect essentially belong to the immaterial sphere like active intellect. He also maintained the potential Aql belong to material faculties only accidentally. Averroes also took a step further since he believed that all human beings have only one potential intellect. The content of intellectual understanding can be found in the perceptual experience such that the truth of intelligible is casually grounded in all things through imagined forms.

== See also ==
- Averroes
- Avicenna
- Farabi
- Islamic philosophy
- Passive intellect
