= Incorporeality =

State or quality of being bodiless

Incorporeality is "the state or quality of being incorporeal or bodiless; immateriality; incorporealism." Incorporeal (Greek: ἀσώματος) means "Not composed of matter; having no material existence."

Incorporeality is a quality of souls, spirits, and God in many religions, including the currently major denominations and schools of Judaism, Christianity, Islam, and the Baháʼí Faith. In ancient philosophy, any attenuated "thin" matter such as air, aether, fire or light was considered incorporeal. The ancient Greeks believed air, as opposed to solid earth, to be incorporeal, insofar as it is less resistant to movement; and the ancient Persians believed fire to be incorporeal in that every soul was said to be produced from it. In modern philosophy, a distinction between the incorporeal and immaterial is not necessarily maintained: a body is described as incorporeal if it is not made out of matter.

In the problem of universals, universals are separable from any particular embodiment in one sense, while in another, they seem inherent nonetheless. Aristotle offered a hylomorphic account of abstraction in contrast to Plato's world of Forms. Aristotle used the Greek terms soma (body) and hyle (matter, literally "wood").

The notion that a causally effective incorporeal body is even coherent requires the belief that something can affect what's material, without physically existing at the point of effect. A ball can directly affect another ball by coming in direct contact with it, and is visible because it reflects the light that directly reaches it. An incorporeal field of influence, or immaterial body could not perform these functions because they have no physical construction with which to perform these functions. Following Newton, it became customary to accept action at a distance as brute fact, and to overlook the philosophical problems involved in so doing.

== Theology ==
=== Church of Jesus Christ of Latter-day Saints ===
Members of the Church of Jesus Christ of Latter-day Saints (see also Mormonism) believe that both God the Father, and Jesus Christ have physical bodies "of flesh and bones as tangible as man’s". They view the mainstream Christian belief in God's incorporeality as being founded upon a post-Apostolic departure from this doctrine of an anthropomorphic, corporeal God, a doctrine which they claim better aligns with the traditional Judeo-Christian belief. Mainstream Christianity has always interpreted anthropomorphic references to God in Scripture as non-literal, poetic, and symbolic.

== See also ==
- Abstract and concrete
- Being
- Ghost
- Idolatry
- Materialism
- Matter
- Metaphysics
- Non-physical entity
- Transparency and translucency
- Vacuum
