= Hylotheism =

Hylotheism (from Gk. hyle, 'matter' and theos, 'God') is the belief that matter and God are the same, so in other words, defining God as matter.

The American Lutheran Church–Missouri Synod defines hylotheism is "Theory equating matter with God or merging one into the other" which it states as "Synonym for pantheism* and materialism.*".

== See also ==
- Pantheism
