= Hylomorphism =

Philosophical doctrine developed by Aristotle

Hylomorphism is a philosophical doctrine developed by the Ancient Greek philosopher Aristotle, which conceives every physical entity or being (ousia) as a compound of matter (potency) and substantial form (act), with the generic form as immanently real within the individual. The word is a 19th-century term formed from the Greek words ὕλη (hyle: "wood, matter") and μορφή (morphē: "form"). Hylomorphic theories of physical entities have been undergoing a revival in contemporary philosophy, especially since the 2000s.

== Aristotle's concept of matter ==
The Ancient Greek language originally had no word for matter in general, as opposed to raw material suitable for some specific purpose or other, so Aristotle adapted the word for "wood" to this purpose. The idea that everything physical is made of the same basic substance holds up well under modern science, although it may be thought of more in terms of energy or matter/energy.

The Latin equivalent of the hyle concept – and later its medieval version – also emerged from Aristotle's notion. The Greek term's Latin equivalent was silva, which literally meant woodland or forest. However, Latin thinkers opted for a word that had a technical sense (rather than literal meaning). This emphasized silva as that of which a thing is made, but one that remained a substratum with changed form. The word materia was chosen instead to indicate a meaning not in handicraft but in the role that mother (mater) plays in conception.

Aristotle's concept of hyle is the principle that correlates with shape and this can be demonstrated in the way the philosopher described hyle, saying it is that which receives form or definiteness, that which is formed. It can also be the material cause underlying a change in Aristotelian philosophy. Aristotle explained that "By hyle I mean that which in itself is neither a particular thing nor of a certain quantity nor assigned to any other of the categories by which being is determined." This means that hyle is brought into existence not due to its being its agent or its own actuality but only when form attaches to it. It has been described as a plenum or a field, a conceptualization that opposed Democritus' atomistic ontology. It is maintained that the Aristotelian concept should not be understood as a "stuff" since there is, for example, hyle that is intellectual as well as sensible hyle found in the body.

For Aristotle, hyle is composed of four elements – fire, water, air, and earth – but these were not considered pure substances since matter and form exist in a combination of hot, moist, dry, and cold so that everything is united to form the elements.

Aristotle defines matter as "that out of which" something is made. For example, letters are the matter of syllables. Thus, "matter" is a relative term: an object counts as matter relative to something else. For example, clay is matter relative to a brick because a brick is made of clay, whereas bricks are matter relative to a brick house. Change is analyzed as a material transformation: matter is what undergoes a change of form. For example, consider a lump of bronze that's shaped into a statue. Bronze is the matter, and this matter loses one form (morphe) (that of a lump) and gains a new form (that of a statue). According to Aristotle's theory of perception, we perceive an object by receiving its form (eidos) with our sense organs. Thus, forms include complex qualia such as colors, textures, and flavors, not just shapes.

== Body–soul hylomorphism ==
=== Basic theory ===
Aristotle applies his theory of hylomorphism to living things. He defines a soul as that which makes a living thing alive. Life is a property of living things, just as knowledge and health are. Therefore, a soul is a form—that is, a specifying principle or cause—of a living thing. Furthermore, Aristotle says that a soul is related to its body as form to matter.

Hence, Aristotle argues, there is no problem in explaining the unity of body and soul, just as there is no problem in explaining the unity of wax and its shape. Just as a wax object consists of wax with a certain shape, so a living organism consists of a body with the property of life, which is its soul. On the basis of his hylomorphic theory, Aristotle rejects the Pythagorean doctrine of metempsychosis, ridiculing the notion that just any soul could inhabit just any body.

According to Timothy Robinson, it is unclear whether Aristotle identifies the soul with the body's structure. According to one interpretation of Aristotle, a properly organized body is already alive simply by virtue of its structure. However, according to another interpretation, the property of life—that is, the soul—is something in addition to the body's structure. Robinson uses the analogy of a car to explain this second interpretation. A running car is running not only because of its structure but also because of the activity in its engine. Likewise, according to this second interpretation, a living body is alive not only because of its structure but also because of an additional property: the soul, which a properly organized body needs in order to be alive. John Vella uses Frankenstein's monster to illustrate the second interpretation: the corpse lying on Frankenstein's table is already a fully organized human body, but it is not yet alive; when Frankenstein activates his machine, the corpse gains a new property, the property of life, which Aristotle would call the soul.

=== Living bodies ===
Some scholars have pointed out a problem facing Aristotle's theory of soul-body hylomorphism. According to Aristotle, a living thing's matter is its body, which needs a soul in order to be alive. Similarly, a bronze sphere's matter is bronze, which needs roundness in order to be a sphere. Now, bronze remains the same bronze after ceasing to be a sphere. Therefore, it seems that a body should remain the same body after death. However, Aristotle implies that a body is no longer the same body after death. Moreover, Aristotle says that a body that has lost its soul is no longer potentially alive. But if a living thing's matter is its body, then that body should be potentially alive by definition.

One approach to resolving this problem relies on the fact that a living body is constantly replacing old matter with new. A five-year-old body consists of different matter than does the same person's seventy-year-old body. If the five-year-old body and the seventy-year-old body consist of different matter, then what makes them the same body? The answer is presumably the soul. Because the five-year-old and the seventy-year-old bodies share a soul—that is, the person's life—we can identify them both as the body. Apart from the soul, we cannot identify what collection of matter is the body. Therefore, a person's body is no longer that person's body after it dies.

Another approach to resolving the problem relies on a distinction between "proximate" and "non-proximate" matter. When Aristotle says that the body is matter for a living thing, he may be using the word "body" to refer to the matter that makes up the fully organized body, rather than the fully organized body itself. Unlike the fully organized body, this "body" remains the same thing even after death. In contrast, when he says that the body is no longer the same after its death, he is using the word "body" to refer to the fully organized body.

=== Intellect ===
Aristotle says that the intellect (nous), the ability to think, has no bodily organ (in contrast with other psychological abilities, such as sense-perception and imagination). Aristotle distinguishes between two types of intellect. These are traditionally called the "passive intellect" and the "active (or agent) intellect". He says that the "active (or agent) intellect" is not mixed with the body and suggests that it can exist apart from it. Hence, scholars face the challenge of explaining the relationship between the intellect and the body in Aristotle.

According to one interpretation, a person's ability to think (unlike his other psychological abilities) belongs to some incorporeal organ distinct from his body. This would amount to a form of dualism. However, according to some scholars, it would not be a full-fledged Cartesian dualism. This interpretation creates what Robert Pasnau has called the "mind-soul problem" within Aristotelian hylomorphism: if the intellect belongs to an entity distinct from the body, and the soul is the form of the body, then how is the intellect part of the soul?

Another interpretation rests on the distinction between the passive intellect and the agent intellect. According to this interpretation, the passive intellect is a property of the body, while the agent intellect is a substance distinct from the body. Some proponents of this interpretation think that each person has his own agent intellect, which presumably separates from the body at death. Others interpret the agent intellect as a single divine being, perhaps the unmoved mover, Aristotle's God.

A third interpretation relies on the theory that an individual form is capable of having properties of its own. According to this interpretation, the soul is a property of the body, but the ability to think is a property of the soul itself, not of the body. If that is the case, then the soul is the body's form and yet thinking need not involve any bodily organ.

== Teleology and ethics ==
Aristotle holds a teleological worldview: he sees the universe as inherently purposeful. Basically, Aristotle claims that potentiality exists for the sake of actuality. Thus, matter exists for the sake of receiving its form, as an organism has sight for the sake of seeing. Now, each thing has certain potentialities as a result of its form. Because of its form, a snake has the potential to slither; we can say that the snake ought to slither. The more a thing achieves its potential, the more it succeeds in achieving its purpose.

Aristotle bases his ethical theory on this teleological worldview. Because of his form, a human being has certain abilities. Hence, his purpose in life is to exercise those abilities as well and as fully as possible. Now, the most characteristic human ability, which is not included in the form of any other organism, is the ability to think. The ability to deliberate makes it possible to choose the course of action that reason deems best—even if it is emotionally undesirable. Contemporary Aristotelians tend to stress exercising freedom and acting wisely as the best way to live. Aristotle argued that the best type of happiness is acting in accord with moral virtue. Either way, for Aristotle the best human life is a life lived rationally.

== Legacy ==
=== Universal hylomorphism ===
The Neoplatonic philosopher Avicebron (Solomon ibn Gabirol) proposed a Neoplatonic version of this Aristotelian concept, according to which all things, including soul and intellect, are composed of matter and form.

With respect to Averroes’s view, what, if only I knew, could necessitate that we not say this very thing in the case of bodies that come to be and pass away, namely, that the matter they contain is their corporeality, and their form the form that is specific to each one and serves each one as the perfection of its corporeality? Corporeality, which he calls “corporeal form,” would then function as matter with respect to its specific form. If so, the matter, even without its specific form, would be in need of a place and would exist in actuality. Behold, my witness is in heaven, since the celestial body, which is a body without matter, is one that exists in actuality. In this way, many difficult and perplexing questions regarding hylic nature as it is generally understood will be resolved. It is open, therefore, to an objector to say that it is not a specific form through which a body exists, but that the corporeal form, which is the substratum in actuality, is that which sustains the specific form

— Hasdai Crescas

Hasdai Crescas imagines that celestial-body is like Hylé but as matter in actuality, sure over the opposition about this, i.e. in potential existence. Matter and form is always presents in all but celestial-bodies are without form because of their nature; so Hasdai Crescas finds the solution also about this paradox.

=== Medieval modifications ===
Thomas Aquinas emphasized the act/potency understanding of form/matter whereby form activates the potency of matter and existence activates souls. The angels are accordingly composites of esse (potentiality) and existence (actuality) that activates immaterial souls, while God alone is per se existence, pure act without any potencies.

Medieval theologians, newly exposed to Aristotle's philosophy, applied hylomorphism to Christian doctrines such as the transubstantiation of the Eucharist's bread and wine into the body and blood of Jesus. Theologians such as Duns Scotus and Thomas Aquinas developed Christian applications of hylomorphism.

Aristotle's texts on the agent intellect have given rise to diverse interpretations. Some following Averroes (Ibn Rushd 1126–1198) argue that Aristotle equated the active intellect with a divine being who infuses concepts into the passive intellect to aid human understanding. Others following Aquinas (1225–74) argue that the Neoplatonic interpretation is a mistake: the active intellect is actually part of the human soul.

==== Substantial form, accidental form, and prime matter ====
Medieval philosophers who used Aristotelian concepts frequently distinguished between substantial forms and accidental forms. A substance necessarily possesses at least one substantial form. It may also possess a variety of accidental forms. For Aristotle, a "substance" (ousia) is an individual thing—for example, an individual man or an individual horse. Within every physical substance, the substantial form determines what kind of thing the physical substance is by actualizing prime matter as individualized by the causes of that thing's coming to be. For instance, the chick comes to be when the substantial form of chickens actualizes the hen's egg and that actualization is possible insofar as that egg is in potency to being actualized both as a chicken due to the receptivity of its prime matter to the substantial form of chickens and into a chick with certain colored feathers due to the individualization of the egg given by its parents. So while the individualized matter determines individualized properties, the substantial form determines essential properties. The substantial form of a substance S consists of its essence and essential properties (the properties that S needs in order to be the kind of substance that S is). Substantial change destroys the ability of a substantial form to actualize individualized prime matter without affecting prime matter's ability to be actualized by a new substantial form; e.g., when the wolf eats the chick, the chick's rearranged matter becomes part of the wolf, and is thence animated by the wolf's substantial form.

In contrast, the accidental forms of S are its non-essential properties—properties that S can lose or gain without changing into a different kind of substance: the chick can lose its feathers (due to, e.g., parasites or the like) without ceasing to be an individual chicken.

==== Plurality vs. unity of substantial form ====
Many medieval theologians and philosophers followed Aristotle in seeing a living being's soul as that being's form—specifically, its substantial form. However, they disagreed about whether X's soul is X's only substantial form. Some medieval thinkers argued that X's soul is X's only substantial form animating the entire body of X. In contrast, other medieval thinkers argued that a living being contains at least two substantial forms—(1) the shape and structure of its body, and (2) its soul, which makes its body alive.

==== Thomistic hylomorphism ====
Thomas Aquinas claimed that X's soul was X's only substantial form, although X also had numerous accidental forms that accounted for X's nonessential features. Aquinas defined a substantial form as that which makes X's matter constitute X, which in the case of a human being is also able to transcend the limitations of matter and establish both the rational capacity and natural immortality of human beings. Nevertheless, Aquinas did not claim that human persons were their disembodied souls because the human soul is essentially a substantial form activating matter into the body. He held that a proper human being is a composite of the rational soul and matter (both prime matter and individualized matter). So a soul separated from its body does not become an angel but retains its orientation to animate matter, while a corpse from which the soul has departed is not actually or potentially a human being.

Eleonore Stump describes Aquinas' theory of the soul in terms of "configuration". The body is matter that is "configured", i.e. structured, while the soul is a "configured configurer". In other words, the soul is itself a configured thing, but it also configures the body. A dead body is merely matter that was once configured by the soul. It does not possess the configuring capacity of a human being.

Aquinas believed that rational capacity was a property of the soul alone, not of any bodily organ. However, he did believe that the brain had some basic cognitive function. Aquinas’ attribution of rational capacity to the immaterial soul allowed him to claim that disembodied souls could retain their rational capacity as his identification of the soul's individual act of existence allowed him to claim that personal immortality is natural for human beings. Aquinas was also adamant that disembodied souls were in an unnatural state and that the perfection of heaven includes God miraculously enabling the soul to function once again as a substantial form by reanimating matter into a living body as promised by the doctrine of the resurrection of the dead.

=== Modern physics ===
The idea of hylomorphism can be said to have been reintroduced to the world when Werner Heisenberg invented his duplex world of quantum mechanics. In his 1958 text Physics and Philosophy, Heisenberg states:

In the experiments about atomic events we have to do with things and facts, with phenomena that are just as real as any phenomena in daily life. But atoms and the elementary particles themselves are not as real; they form a world of potentialities or possibilities rather than one of things or facts ... The probability wave ... mean[s] tendency for something. It's a quantitative version of the old concept of potentia from Aristotle's philosophy. It introduces something standing in the middle between the idea of an event and the actual event, a strange kind of physical reality just in the middle between possibility and reality.

A hylomorphic interpretation of Bohmian mechanics has been suggested, in which the cosmos is a single substance that is composed of both material particles and a substantial form. There is also a hylomorphic interpretation of the collapse of the wave function.

=== Hylomorphism in contemporary anthropology ===
Anthropologist Tim Ingold has critiqued the classical hylomorphic model in his article The Textility of Making (2010), arguing that form is not imposed on passive matter by an external agent but instead "emerges within the process of making". He describes this alternative as a morphogenetic approach, influenced by process philosophy and drawing on ideas from Gilles Deleuze and Félix Guattari. Ingold emphasizes the active participation of materials, proposing that making is a relational and temporal unfolding rather than the execution of a predefined design.

== See also ==
- Endurantism
- Hylotheism
- Hylozoism
- Inherence
- Moderate realism
- Sacramental matter and form
- Substance theory
- Tripartitism
- Vitalism

== Sources ==
- Aristotle.
  - Metaphysics
  - Nicomachean Ethics
  - On the Soul.
  - Physics
- Caston, Victor.
  - "Aristotle's Psychology". A Companion to Ancient Philosophy. Ed. Mary Gill and Pierre Pellegrin. Hoboken: Wiley-Blackwell, 2006. 316–46.
  - "Aristotle's Two Intellects: A Modest Proposal". Phronesis 44.3 (1999): 199–227.
- Cross, Richard. The Physics of Duns Scotus. Oxford: Oxford UP, 1998.
- Eberl, Jason T. "Aquinas on the Nature of Human Beings." The Review of Metaphysics 58.2 (November 2004): 333–65.
- Gilson, Étienne. The Philosophy of St. Bonaventure. Trans. F. J. Sheed. NY: Sheed & Ward, 1938.
- Irwin, Terence. Aristotle's First Principles. Oxford: Oxford UP, 1990.
- Keck, David. Angels & Angelology in the Middle Ages. NY: Oxford UP, 1998.
- Kenny, Anthony. Aquinas on Mind. London: Routledge, 1993.
- Leftow, Brian.
  - "Souls Dipped in Dust." Soul, Body, and Survival: Essays on the Metaphysics of Human Persons. Ed. Kevin Corcoran. NY: Cornell UP, 2001. 120–38.
  - "Soul, Mind, and Brain." The Waning of Materialism. Ed. Robert C. Koons and George Bealer. Oxford: Oxford UP, 2010. 395–417.
- McEvilley, Thomas. The Shape of Ancient Thought. NY: Allworth, 2002.
- Mendell, Henry. "Aristotle and Mathematics". Stanford Encyclopedia of Philosophy. 26 March 2004. Stanford University. 2 July 2009 <http://plato.stanford.edu/entries/aristotle-mathematics/>.
- Normore, Calvin. "The Matter of Thought". Representation and Objects of Thought in Medieval Philosophy. Ed. Henrik Lagerlund. Hampshire: Ashgate, 2007. 117–133.
- Pasnau, Robert. Thomas Aquinas on Human Nature. Cambridge: Cambridge UP, 2001.
- Robinson, Timothy. Aristotle in Outline. Indianapolis: Hackett, 1995.
- Simondon, Gilbert (2003). L’Individuation à la lumière des notions de forme et d’information [1958]. Paris: Jérôme Millon.
- Shields, Christopher.
  - "A Fundamental Problem about Hylomorphism". Stanford Encyclopedia of Philosophy. Stanford University. 29 June 2009 <http://plato.stanford.edu/entries/aristotle-psychology/suppl1.html>.
  - Aristotle. London: Routledge, 2007.
  - "Some Recent Approaches to Aristotle's De Anima". De Anima: Books II and III (With Passages From Book I). Trans. W.D. Hamlyn. Oxford: Clarendon, 1993. 157–81.
  - "Soul as Subject in Aristotle's De Anima". Classical Quarterly 38.1 (1988): 140–49.
- Stump, Eleanore.
  - "Non-Cartesian Substance Dualism and Materialism without Reductionism." Faith and Philosophy 12.4 (October 1995): 505–31.
  - "Resurrection, Reassembly, and Reconstitution: Aquinas on the Soul." Die Menschliche Seele: Brauchen Wir Den Dualismus. Ed. B. Niederbacher and E. Runggaldier. Frankfurt, 2006. 151–72.
- Vella, John. Aristotle: A Guide for the Perplexed. NY: Continuum, 2008.
- M.Tiziana Mayer. Menahem da Recanati. Commento alla Genesi: Gn. 1.1-16. Aquilegia Edizioni. Milano, 2005
