= Intelligible form =

Concept in philosophy

An intelligible form in philosophy refers to a form that can be apprehended by the intellect, in contrast to sense perception. According to Ancient and Medieval philosophers, the intelligible forms are the things by which we understand. These are Genera and species. Genera and species are abstract concepts, not concrete objects. For example, “animal”, “man” and “horse” are general terms that do not refer to any particular individual in the natural world. Only specific animals, men and horses exist in reality according to some forms of naturalism.

== Usage ==
The objects or concepts that have intelligibility may be called intelligible. Some possible examples are numbers and the logical law of non-contradiction.

There may be a distinction between everything that is intelligible and everything that is visible, called the intelligible world and the visible world in e.g. the analogy of the divided line as written by Plato.

== Plato ==
Plato referred to the intelligible realm of mathematics, forms, first principles, logical deduction, and the dialectical method. The intelligible realm of thought thinking about thought does not necessarily require any visual images, sensual impressions, and material causes for the contents of mind.

== Aristotle ==
The concept of the form as being what makes knowledge possible dates back to the time of Socrates. Aristotle is credited with making the distinction that led to the idea of the intelligible form. He argued that the mind is divided into the active and passive intellect, where the passive intellect receives the forms of things in order to be known, and the active intellect then turns possible knowledge into knowledge in act.

== Plotinus ==
According to Plotinus, the power of the Demiurge (the 'craftsman' of the cosmos) is derived from the power of thought. When the demiurge creates, he governs the purely passive nature of matter by imposing a sensible form, which is an image of the intelligible forms contained as thoughts within the mind of the Demiurge, upon the pure passivity of matter. The form establishes its existence in the sensible realm merely through the thought of the Demiurge, which is nous.

== Aquinas ==
In his Compendium Theologiae, St. Thomas Aquinas discusses a hierarchy of intellectual substances, and the relation thereof to intelligible forms as apprehended by the human intellect:

[. . .] the higher an intellectual substance is in perfection, the more universal are the intelligible forms it possesses. Of all the intellectual substances, consequently, the human intellect, which we have called possible, has forms of the least universality. This is the reason it receives its intelligible forms from sensible things. [. . .] A form must have some proportion to the potency which receives it. Therefore, since of all intellectual substances man’s possible intellect is found to be the closest to corporeal matter, its intelligible forms must, likewise, be most closely allied to material things.
