= Actus primus =

Concept in scholastic philosophy

Actus primus, or first actuality, is a technical expression used in scholastic philosophy.

The Latin word actus means determination or complement. In every being there are many actualities, which are subordinated. Thus, existence supposes essence, power supposes existence, and faction supposes faculty. The first actuality (actus primus) begins a series: it supposes no other actuality preceding it in the same series, but calls for a further complement, namely, the second actuality (actus secundus).

But as the same reality may be called "actuality" when viewed in the light of what precedes, and "potentiality" when viewed in the light of what follows (see actus et potentia), the meaning of the term "first actuality" may vary according to the view one takes, and the point where the series is made to begin. Primary matter (see matter and form) is a pure potentiality, and the substantial form is its first determination, its first actuality. The complete substance constituted by these two principles receives further determinations, which are, in that respect, second actualities. Yet these may also be conceived as first actualities. Thus the extensive quantity of a substance is a first actuality when compared to the shape. Power is a first actuality when compared to action.

This is the most frequent application of the terms actus primus and actus secundus. The former is the faculty; the latter, the exercise or function. To see in actu primo simply means to have the sense of vision; to see in actu secundo is to actually perform acts of vision. The modern distinction of potential and kinetic energy might serve as another illustration: the loaded gun, or the engine with steam buildup, represent first actualities; the bullet speeding to the mark, the engine flying over the rails, represent second actualities.

== See also ==
- Actus Purus
- Actus Essendi
