= Henosis =

Classical Greek word for mystical oneness

Henosis (Ancient Greek: ἕνωσις) is the classical Greek word for mystical "oneness", "union" or "unity". In Neoplatonism, henosis refers to the unification with what is fundamental in reality: the One (Τὸ Ἕν), the Source, or Monad. The Neoplatonic concept has precedents in the Greek mystery religions as well as parallels in Eastern philosophy. It is further developed in the Corpus Hermeticum, in Christian theology, Islamic Mysticism, soteriology and mysticism. Henosis is also an important factor in the historical development of monotheism during Late Antiquity.

== Etymology ==
The term is relatively common in classical texts, and has the meaning of "union" or "unity". (Note: LSJ entry for enosis: ἕνωσις, -εως, ἡ, (from ἑνόω "Ι unite") A. combination into one, union, Philol.10, Archyt. ap.Stob.1.41.2, Arist.Ph.222a20, GC328b22, Phld.Po.2.17, Ph.1.45, al.; “τοῦ συμφραζομένου” A.D.Synt.175.16, cf. Hermog.Id.2.11: pl., Procl.Inst.63. II. compression, Heliod. ap. Orib.46.11.20.)

== Process of unification ==
Henosis, or primordial unity, is rational and deterministic, emanating from indeterminism, an uncaused cause. Each individual as a microcosm reflects the gradual ordering of the universe referred to as the macrocosm. In mimicking the demiurge (divine mind), one unites with the One or Monad. Thus the process of unification of "the Being" and "the One" is called henosis, the culmination of which is deification.

== Plotinus ==
Henosis for Plotinus (204/5–270 CE) was defined in his works as a reversing of the ontological process of consciousness via meditation (or contemplation) toward no thought (nous or demiurge) and no division (dyad) within the individual (being). As is specified in the writings of Plotinus on Henology, (Note: Plotinus: * "Our thought cannot grasp the One so long as any other image remains active in the soul. To this end, you must set free your soul from all outward things and turn wholly within yourself, with no more leaning to what lies outside, and lay your mind bare of ideal forms, as before of the objects of sense, and forget even yourself, and so come within sight of that One. [6.9.7] * "If he remembers who he became when he merged with the One, he will bear its image in himself. He was himself one, with no diversity in himself or his outward relations; for no movement was in him, no passion, no desire for another, once the ascent was accomplished. Nor indeed was there any reason or though, nor, if we dare say it, any trace of himself." [6.9.11.]) one can reach a tabula rasa, a blank state where the individual may grasp or merge with The One. This absolute simplicity means that the nous or the person is then dissolved, completely absorbed back into the Monad.

Within the Enneads of Plotinus, the Monad can be referred to as the Good above the demiurge. The Monad or dynamis (force) is of one singular expression (the will or the one is the good), all is contained in the Monad and the Monad is all and in all (panentheism). All division is reconciled in the one, the final stage before reaching singularity, and what is called duality (dyad) is completely reconciled in the Monad, Source or One (see monism). As the source or substance of all things, the Monad is all encompassing. As infinite and indeterminate, all is reconciled in the dynamis or one. It is the demiurge or second emanation that is the nous in Plotinus. It is the demiurge (creator, action, energy) or nous that "perceives," and therefore causes the force (potential or One) to manifest as energy, or the dyad, called the material world. Nous as being, being and perception (intellect) manifest what is called soul (World Soul).

Plotinus words his teachings to reconcile not only Plato with Aristotle, but also various world religions that he had personal contact with during his various travels. Plotinus' works have an ascetic character in that they reject matter as an illusion (non-existent). Matter was strictly treated as immanent, with matter as essential to its being, having no true or transcendental character or essence, substance or ousia. This approach is called philosophical Idealism. (Note: Schopenhauer wrote of this Neoplatonist philosopher: "With Plotinus there even appears, probably for the first time in Western philosophy, idealism that had long been current in the East even at that time, for it taught (Enneads, iii, lib. vii, c.10) that the soul has made the world by stepping from eternity into time, with the explanation: 'For there is for this universe no other place than the soul or mind' (neque est alter hujus universi locus quam anima), indeed the ideality of time is expressed in the words: 'We should not accept time outside the soul or mind' (oportet autem nequaquam extra animam tempus accipere).")

=== Phases ===
Plotinus' phases of "mystical union with the One" as given by Mazur (2021):

- Phase 1, Catharsis: self-purification (aphairesis) from any contamination with multiplicity (of any thought, knowledge, or mental activity); "removing" Being itself (Enneads III.8.10)
- Phase 2, Mystical self-reversion: "The intellect ... must ‘withdraw backwards’ and surrender itself to what lies behind it" (Enneads III.8.9)
- Phase 3, Autophany: luminous vision of one's own self
  - Phase 3.2, Self-unification: to "become one from many" (Enneads VI.9.3)
- Phase 4, Annihilation: discussed in the Enneads VI.9
- Phase 5, Union with the One
  - Phase 5.2, Desubjectification

Passages in the Enneads describing the different stages of mystical union with the One can be found in I.6, IV.8, VI.9, III.8, V.3, V.5, V.8, and VI.7-8.

== Iamblichus of Chalcis ==
Within the works of Iamblichus of Chalcis (c. 245 – c. 325 AD), the process of achieving henosis—union with the divine—is not accomplished through contemplation alone, as in the teachings of Plotinus, but through the ritual practice of theurgy. By reenacting the creative ordering of the cosmos, initiates mimic the actions of the demiurge and align themselves with the divine order. These rituals, drawn in part from the mystery religions, serve to unite the inner and outer aspects of the self, restoring harmony and opening the way to divine union. Central to this process is the assumption of divine forms—a kind of divine embodiment—through which the practitioner ritually identifies with higher beings or intelligences. Through these embodied enactments, the soul ascends the hierarchy of being and is gradually reintegrated into the divine source, culminating in henosis.

== See also ==
- Absolute (philosophy)
- Apotheosis
- Fana (Sufism)
- Form of the Good
- Hesychasm
- Henology
- Henotheism
- A Greek–English Lexicon (LSJ)
- Moksha
- Monolatrism
- Neoplatonism and Gnosticism
- Nondualism
- Rational mysticism
- Self-realization
- Theosis (Eastern Orthodox theology)

== Sources ==
- Angus, Samuel (1975) [1920], The Mystery religions: A Study in the Religious Background of Early Christianity, Courier Dover Publications, ISBN 0-486-23124-0
- Gregorios, Paulos (2002), Neoplatonism and Indian Philosophy, SUNY Press
- Shaw, G.; Milbank, J. (2014), Theurgy and the Soul: The Neoplatonism of Iamblichus, Angelico Press, ISBN 978-1-62138-072-6
- Stamatellos, Giannis (2007), Plotinus and the Presocratics: A Philosophical Study of Presocratic Influences in Plotinus' Enneads, SUNY Press, ISBN 978-0791470626
