= Contemplation =

Profound religious thought

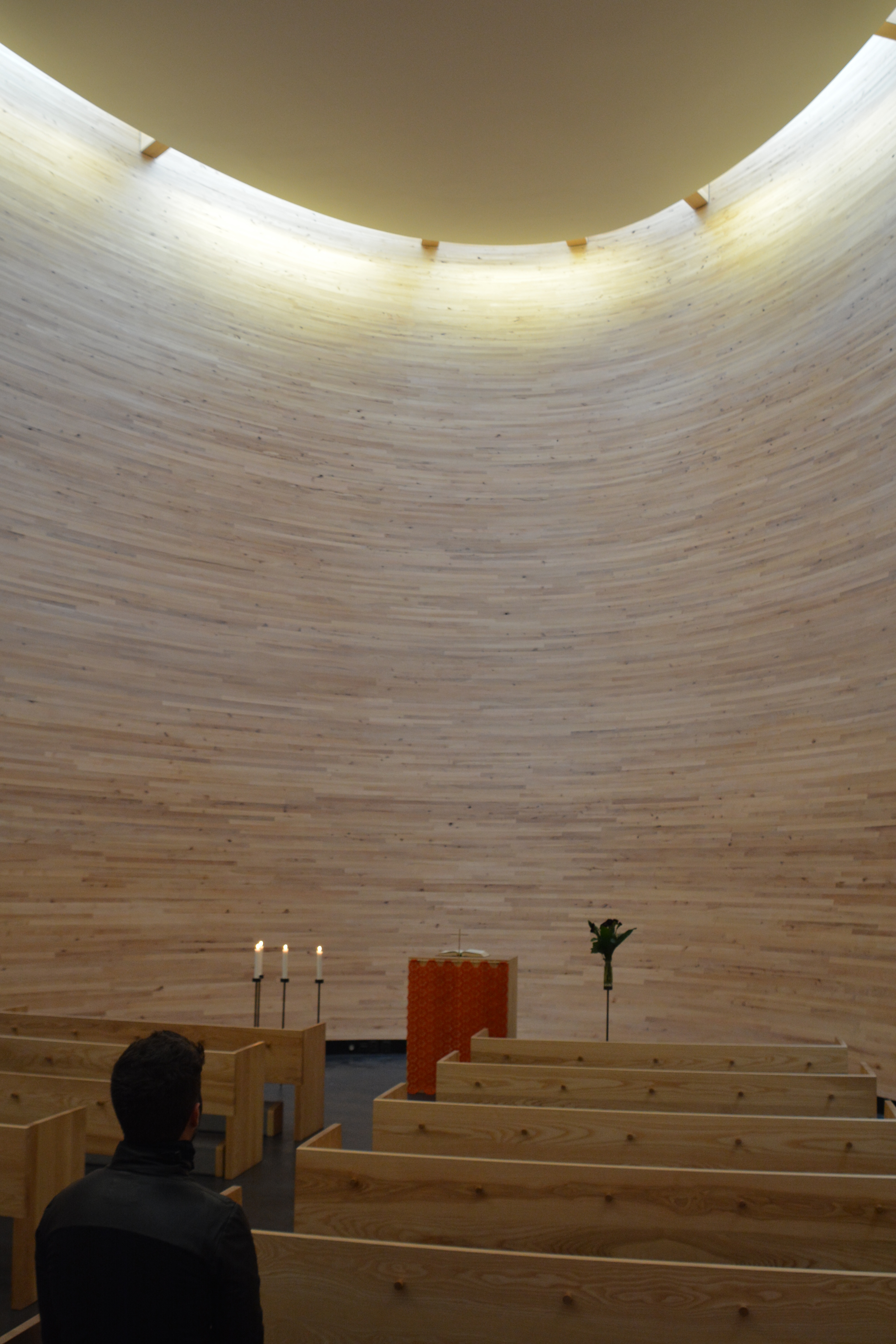
Kamppi Chapel in Helsinki City Centre is a community centre, assigned for contemplation.

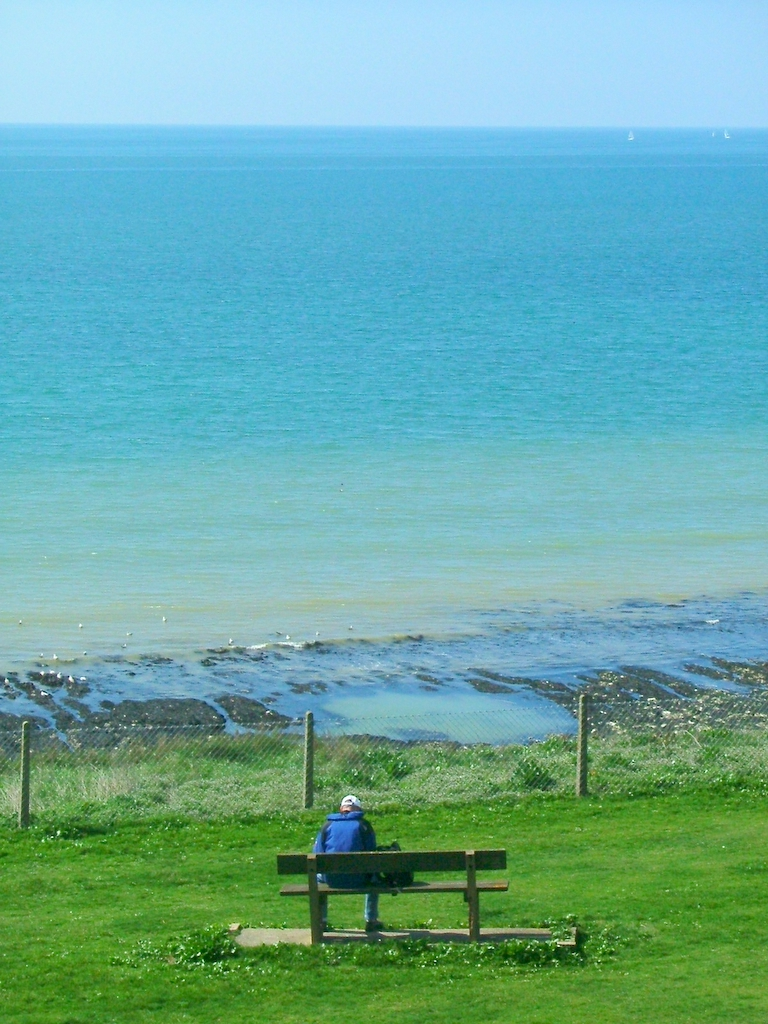
Nature contemplation

In a religious context, the practice of contemplation seeks a direct awareness of the divine which transcends the intellect, often in accordance with religious practices such as meditation or prayer.

== Etymology ==
The word contemplation is derived from the Latin word contemplatio, ultimately from the Latin word templum, a piece of ground consecrated for the taking of auspices, or a building for worship. The latter either derives from the Proto-Indo-European root *tem- ‘to cut’, on notion of "place reserved or cut out", or from the root *temp- ‘to stretch, string’, thus referring to a cleared (measured) space in front of an altar. The Latin word contemplatio was used to translate the Greek word θεωρία (theōría).

== Greek philosophy ==
Contemplation was an important part of the philosophy of Plato; Plato thought that through contemplation, the soul may ascend to knowledge of the Form of the Good or other divine Forms. Plotinus as a (neo)Platonic philosopher also expressed contemplation as the most critical of components for one to reach henosis. To Plotinus the highest contemplation was to experience the vision of God, the Monad or the One. Plotinus describes this experience in his works the Enneads. According to his student Porphyry, Plotinus stated that he had this experience of God four times. Plotinus wrote about his experience in Enneads 6.9.

== Judaism ==
A number of sources have described the importance of contemplation in Jewish traditions, especially in Jewish meditation. Contemplation was central to the teaching of the Jewish philosopher Maimonides, who taught that contemplating God involves recognizing moral perfection, and that one must interrupt contemplation to attend to the poor. Contemplation has also been central to the Musar movement.

== Christianity ==
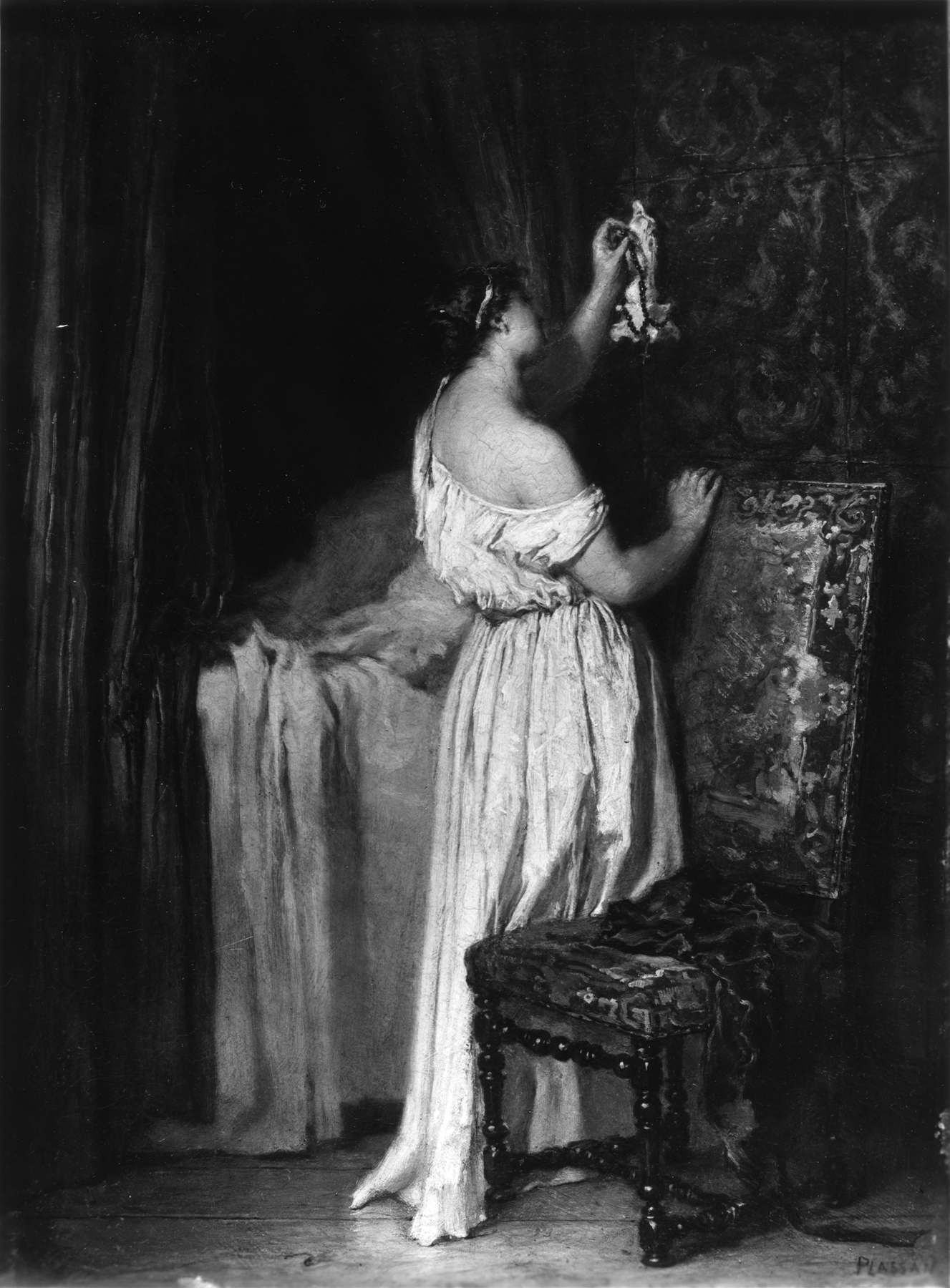
A woman places rosary beads on a devotional image mounted on the wall beside her bed. The Walters Art Museum.

In Eastern Christianity, contemplation (theoria) literally means to see God or to have the Vision of God. (Note: Metropolitan Hierotheos Vlachos: "The vision of the uncreated light, which offers knowledge of God to man, is sensory and supra-sensory. The bodily eyes are reshaped, so they see the uncreated light, "this mysterious light, inaccessible, immaterial, uncreated, deifying, eternal", this "radiance of the Divine Nature, this glory of the divinity, this beauty of the heavenly kingdom" (3,1,22;CWS p.80). Palamas asks: "Do you see that light is inaccessible to senses which are not transformed by the Spirit?" (2,3,22). St. Maximus, whose teaching is cited by St. Gregory, says that the Apostles saw the uncreated Light "by a transformation of the activity of their senses, produced in them by the Spirit" (2.3.22).) The state of beholding God, or union with God, is known as theoria. The process of Theosis which leads to that state of union with God known as theoria is practiced in the ascetic tradition of Hesychasm. Hesychasm is to reconcile the heart and the mind into one thing (see nous). (Note: pelagia.org: "Stillness of the body is a limiting of the body. 'The beginning of hesychia is godly rest' (3). The intermediate stage is that of 'illuminating power and vision; and the end is ecstasy or rapture of the nous towards God' (4). St. John of the Ladder, referring to outward, bodily stillness, writes: 'The lover of stillness keeps his mouth shut' (5). But it is not only those called neptic Fathers who mention and describe the holy atmosphere of hesychia, it is also those known as 'social'. Actually in the Orthodox tradition there is no direct opposition between theoria and praxis, nor between the neptic and social Fathers. The neptics are eminently social and those in community are unimaginably neptic.")

Contemplation in Eastern Orthodoxy is expressed in degrees as those covered in St John Climacus' Ladder of Divine Ascent. The process of changing from the old man of sin into the newborn child of God and into our true nature as good and divine is called Theosis.

This is to say that once someone is in the presence of God, deified with him, then they can begin to properly understand, and there "contemplate" God. This form of contemplation is to have and pass through an actual experience rather than a rational or reasoned understanding of theory (see Gnosis). Whereas with rational thought one uses logic to understand, one does the opposite with God (see also Apophatic theology).

The anonymously authored 14th century English contemplative work The Cloud of Unknowing makes clear that its form of practice is not an act of the intellect, but a kind of transcendent 'seeing,' beyond the usual activities of the mind - "The first time you practice contemplation, you'll experience a darkness, like a cloud of unknowing. You won't know what this is... this darkness and this cloud will always be between you and your God... they will always keep you from seeing him clearly by the light of understanding in your intellect and will block you from feeling Him fully in the sweetness of love in your emotions. So be sure to make your home in this darkness... We can't think our way to God... that's why I'm willing to abandon everything I know, to love the one thing I cannot think. He can be loved, but not thought."

Within Western Christianity contemplation is often related to mysticism as expressed in the works of mystical theologians such as Teresa of Avila and John of the Cross as well as the writings of Margery Kempe, Augustine Baker and Thomas Merton.

Dom Cuthbert Butler notes that contemplation was the term used in the Latin Church to refer to mysticism, and "'mysticism' is a quite modern word".

=== Meditation ===
In Christianity, contemplation refers to a content-free mind directed towards the awareness of God as a living reality. Meditation, on the other hand, for many centuries in the Western Church, referred to more cognitively active exercises, such as visualizations of Biblical scenes as in the Ignatian exercises or lectio divina in which the practitioner "listens to the text of the Bible with the 'ear of the heart', as if he or she is in conversation with God, and God is suggesting the topics for discussion."

In Catholic Christianity, contemplation is given importance. The Catholic Church's "model theologian", St. Thomas Aquinas wrote: "It is requisite for the good of the human community that there should be persons who devote themselves to the life of contemplation." (Sentences) One of his disciples, Josef Pieper commented: "For it is contemplation which preserves in the midst of human society the truth which is at one and the same time useless and the yardstick of every possible use; so it is also contemplation which keeps the true end in sight, gives meaning to every practical act of life." Pope John Paul II in the Apostolic Letter "Rosarium Virginis Mariae" referred specifically to the catholic devotion of the Holy Rosary as "an exquisitely contemplative prayer" and said that "By its nature the recitation of the Rosary calls for a quiet rhythm and a lingering pace, helping the individual to meditate on the mysteries of the Lord's life as seen through the eyes of her who was closest to the Lord. In this way the unfathomable riches of these mysteries are disclosed."

According to Aquinas, the highest form of life is the contemplative which communicates the fruits of contemplation to others, since it is based on the abundance of contemplation (contemplari et contemplata aliis tradere) (ST, III, Q. 40, A. 1, Ad 2).

Reginald Garrigou-Lagrange elaborated upon the broad calling to Mystical Contemplation.

== Islam ==
In Islamic tradition, it is said that Muhammad would go into the desert, climb a mountain known as Mount Hira, and seclude himself from the world. While on the mountain, he would contemplate life and its meaning.

== Bahai Faith ==
Baha'u'llah and Abdu'l-Baha wrote about contemplation and meditation in regards to reflecting on beauty, the Kingdom of God, science, and the arts. Abdu'l-Baha stated that "the sign of the intellect is contemplation and the sign of contemplation is silence... he cannot both speak and meditate".

== See also ==
- Attunement
- Contemplative education
- Contemplative prayer
- Henosis
- Hesychasm
- Miksang (contemplative photography)
- Prayer of Quiet
- Quietism (Christian philosophy)
- Religious experience
