= Composition (visual arts) =

Placement or arrangement of visual elements or ingredients in a work of art

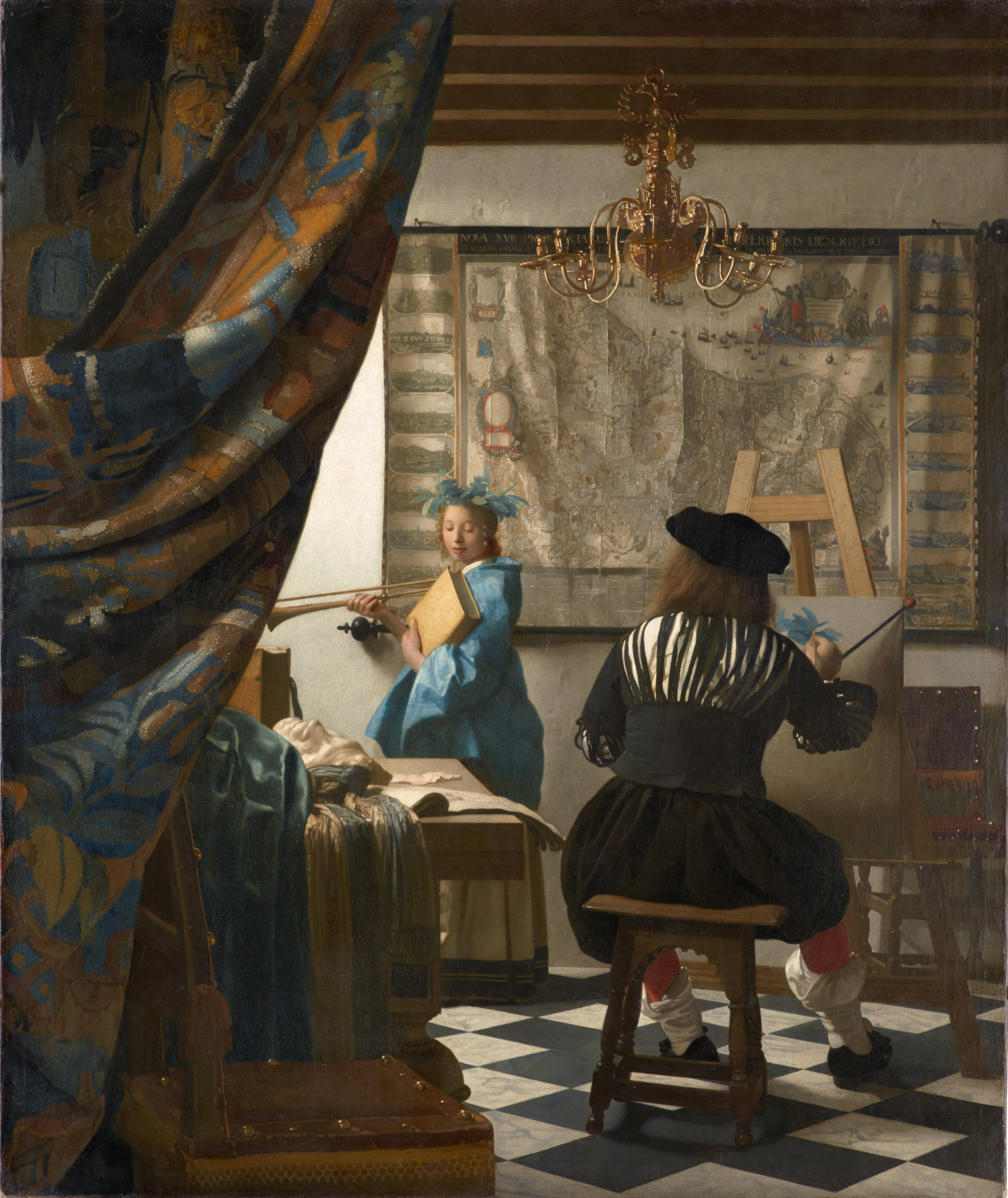
The Art of Painting by Jan Vermeer

In visual arts, composition (meaning "putting together") is the organization of an artwork. It is often used interchangeably with various terms such as design, form, visual ordering, or formal structure, depending on the context. In graphic design for press and desktop publishing, composition is commonly referred to as page layout.

The composition of a picture is different from its subject (what is depicted), whether a moment from a story, a person or a place. Many subjects, for example Saint George and the Dragon, are often portrayed in art, but using a great range of compositions even though the two figures are typically the only ones shown.

== Elements of design ==
The central visual element, known as element of design, formal element, or element of art, constitute the vocabulary with which the visual artist compose. These elements in the overall design usually relate to each other and to the whole art work.

The elements of design are:

- Line — the visual path that enables the eye to move within the piece
- Shape — areas defined by edges within the piece, whether geometric or organic
- Color — hues with their various values and intensities
- Texture — surface qualities which translate into tactile illusions
- Value — Shading used to emphasize form
- Form — 3-D length, width, or depth
- Space — the space taken up by (positive) or in between (negative) objects

=== Line and shape ===
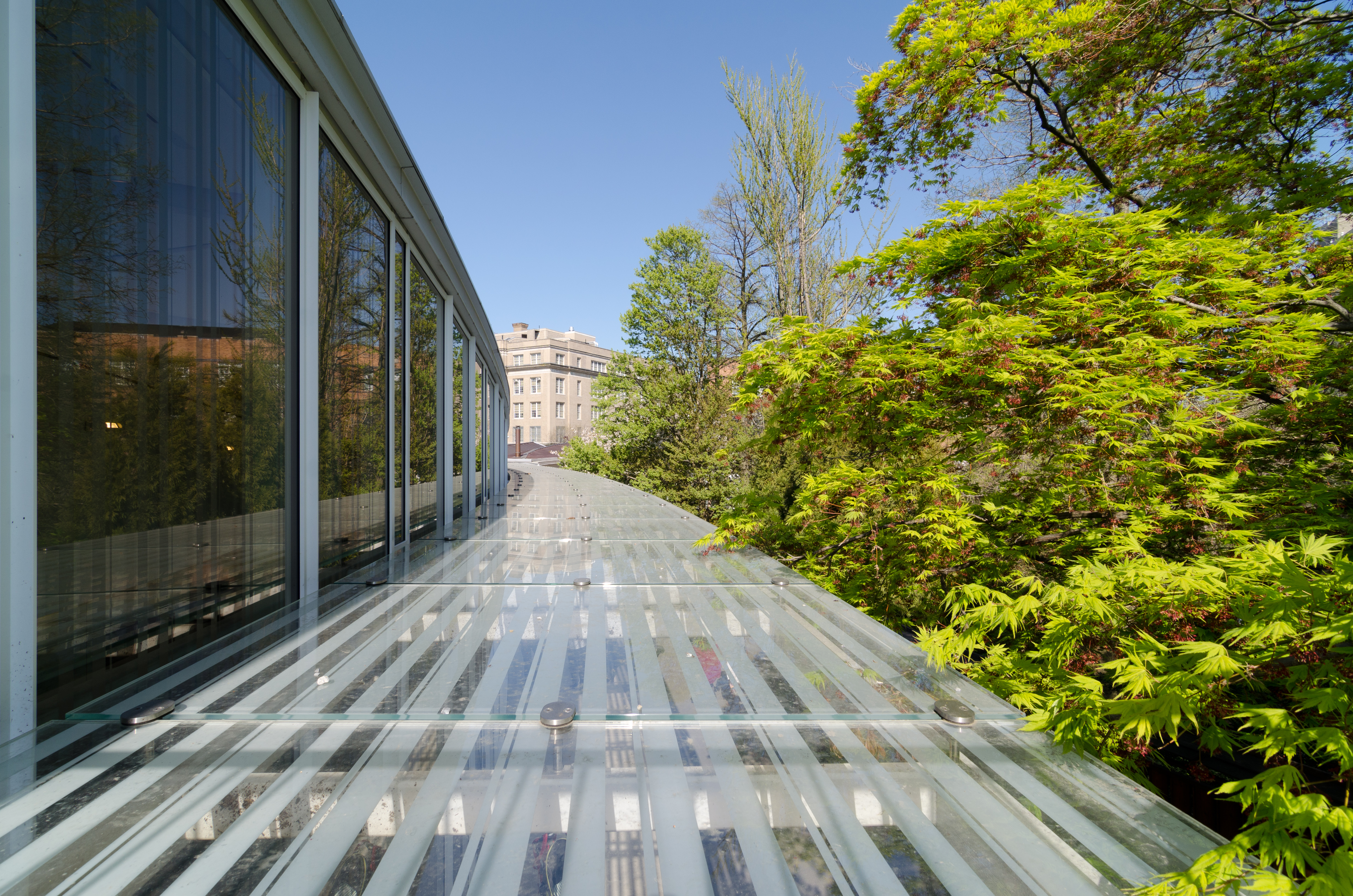
Patterns in the frosted glass form leading lines which help draw in the viewer's eye in this photograph of a ledge in the Brooklyn Botanic Garden.

Lines are optical phenomena that allow the artist to direct the eye of the viewer. The optical illusion of lines exists in nature, and in visual arts, elements can be arranged to create this illusion. The viewer unconsciously "reads" the image through the continuous arrangement of different elements and subjects at varying distances. Such elements can be of dramatic use in the composition of the image. These could be literal lines such as telephone and power cables or rigging on boats. Lines can also derive from the borders of different colors or contrast, or sequences of discrete elements. Movement is also a source of lines, where the blurred movement renders as a line.

Subject lines contribute to both mood and linear perspective, giving the viewer the illusion of depth. Oblique lines convey a sense of movement, and angular lines generally convey dynamism and possibly tension. Lines can also direct attention towards the main subject of the picture or contribute to the organization by dividing it into compartments. The artist may exaggerate or create lines, perhaps as part of their message to the viewer. Many lines without a clear subject-point suggest chaos in the image, and may conflict with the mood the artist is trying to evoke.

A line's angle and its relationship to the frame's size influence the perspective of the image. Horizontal lines, commonly found in landscape photography, can give the impression of calm, tranquility, and space. An image filled with strong vertical lines tends to have the appearance of height and grandeur. Tightly angled convergent lines give a dynamic, lively, and active effect to the image. Firmly turned, almost diagonal lines produce tension in the picture. The viewpoint of visual art is fundamental because every different perspective views different angled lines. This change of perspective elicits a different response to the image. Changing the angle only by some degrees or some centimeters lines in embodiments can vary tremendously, and a distinct feeling can be transported. Straight lines are also strongly influenced by tone, color, and repetition concerning the rest of the image.

Compared to straight lines, curves provide a greater dynamic influence in a picture. They are also generally more aesthetically pleasing, as the viewer associates them with nature and softness. In photography, curved lines can give graduated shadows when paired with soft-directional lighting, which usually results in a very harmonious line structure within the image. There are two main types of curves, a simple "C" curve as well as a more sinuous "S" curve.

=== Color ===
There are three properties of color: hue, brightness or chroma, and value. Hue is the name of a color (red, yellow, and blue, etc.). Brightness and chroma refer to the intensity and strength of the color. A high chroma color is more pure and less greyed than a low chroma color. The lightness or darkness to a color is the value. Color also has the ability to work within our emotions. Given that, we can use color to create mood. It can also be used as tone, pattern, light, movement, symbol, form, harmony, and contrast.

=== Texture ===
Texture refers to how an object feels or how it looks like it may feel if it were touched. There are two ways we experience texture, physically and optically. Different techniques can be used to create physical texture, which allows qualities of visual art to be seen and felt. This can include surfaces such as metal, sand, and wood. Optical texture is when the illusion of physical texture is created. Photography, paintings, and drawings use visual texture to create a more realistic appearance.

=== Value ===
Lightness and darkness are known as value in visual art. Value deals with how light reflects off objects and how we see it. The more light that is reflected, the higher the value. White is the highest or lightest value while black is the lowest or darkest value. Colors also have value; for example, yellow has a high value while blue and red have a low value. If you take a black and white picture of a colorful scene, all you are left with are the values. This important element of design, especially in painting and drawing, allows the artist to create the illusion of light through value contrast.

=== Form ===
The term form can mean different things in visual art. Form suggests a three-dimensional object in space. It is also described as the physical nature of the artwork, such as sculptures. It can also be looked at as art form, which can be expressed through fine art. A form encloses volume, has length, width, and height, unlike a shape, which is only two-dimensional. Forms that are mathematical, a sphere, pyramid, cube, cylinder, and cone, are known as geometric forms. Organic forms are typically irregular and asymmetrical. This form can be found in nature, such as flowers, rocks, trees, etc., but can also be seen in architecture.

Forms in drawing and painting convey the illusion of three-dimensional form through lighting, shadows, value, and tone. The more contrast in value, the more pronounced the three-dimensional form is. Forms with little value appear flatter than those with greater variation and contrasting.

=== Space ===
Space is the area around, above, and within an object. Photographers can capture space, architects build space, and painters create space. This element is found in each of the visual arts. It can be positive or negative, open or closed, shallow or deep, and two-dimensional or three-dimensional. In drawing or painting, space is not actually there, but the illusion of it is. Positive space is the subject of the piece. The empty spaces around, above, and within, is negative space.

== Compositional techniques ==
There are numerous approaches or "compositional techniques" to achieve a sense of unity within an artwork, depending on the goals of the artist. For example, a work of art is said to be aesthetically pleasing to the eye if the elements within the work are arranged in a balanced compositional way. However, there are artists such as Salvador Dalí who aim to disrupt traditional composition and challenge the viewer to rethink balance and design elements within art works.

Conventional composition can be achieved with a number of techniques:

=== Rule of thirds ===
The rule of thirds is a composition guide that states that arranging the important features of an image on or near the horizontal and vertical lines that would divide the image into thirds horizontally and vertically is visually pleasing. The objective is to stop the subjects and areas of interest (such as the horizon) from bisecting the image, by placing them near one of the lines that would divide the image into three equal columns and rows, ideally near the intersection of those lines.

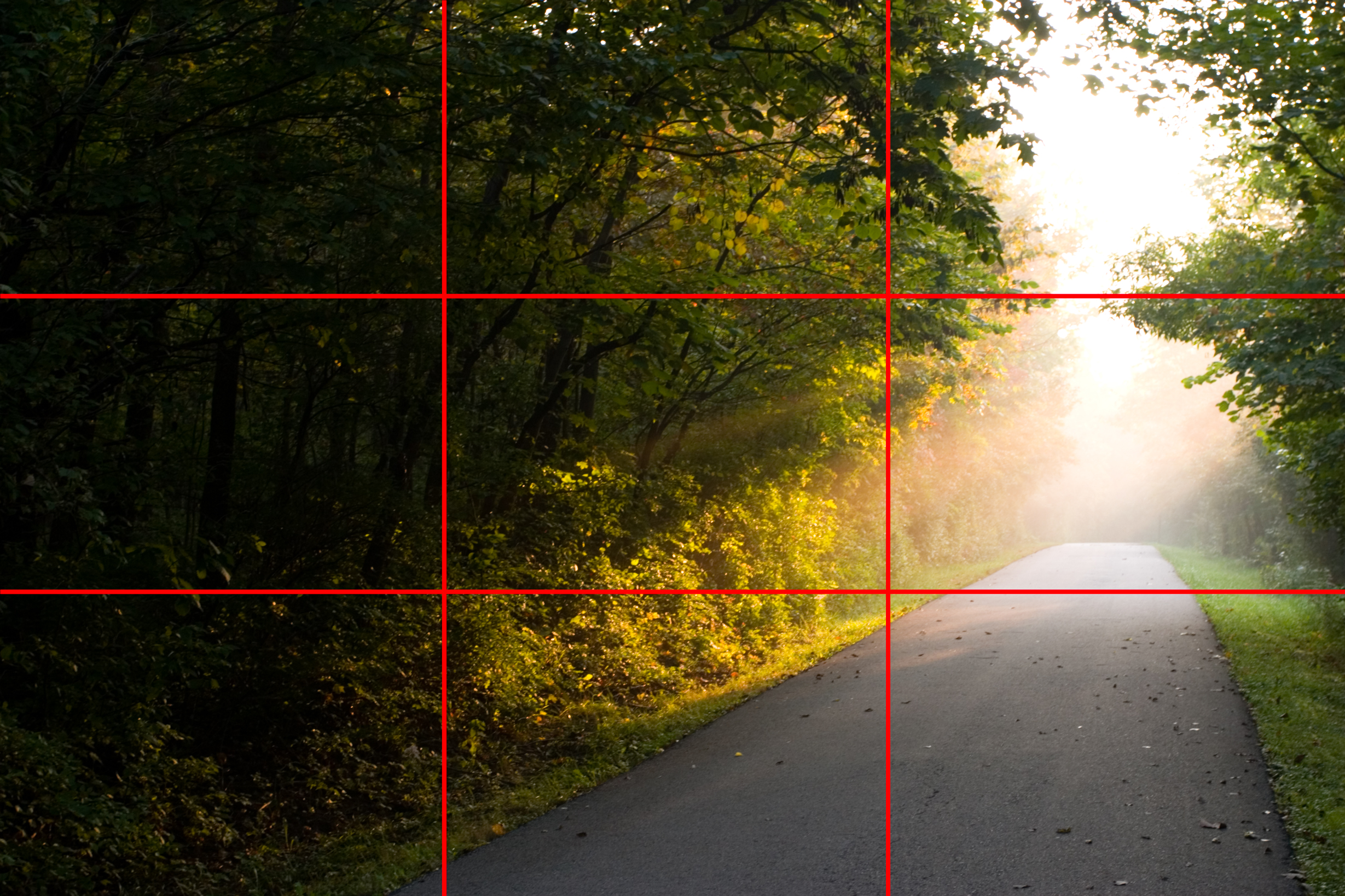
Rule of thirds: Note how the horizon falls close to the bottom grid line, and how the dark areas are in the left third, the overexposed in the right third.

The rule of thirds is thought to be a simplification of the golden ratio. The golden ratio is thought to have been used by artists throughout history as a composition guide, but there is little evidence to support this claim.

=== Rule of odds ===
The "rule of odds" suggests that an odd number of subjects in an image is more interesting than an even number. Thus if you have more than one subject in your picture, the suggestion is to choose an arrangement with at least three subjects. An even number of subjects produces symmetries in the image, which can appear less natural for a naturalistic, informal composition.

An image of a person surrounded/framed by two other persons, for instance, where the person in the center is the object of interest in that image/artwork, is more likely to be perceived as friendly and comforting by the viewer, than an image of a single person with no significant surroundings.

=== Rule of space ===
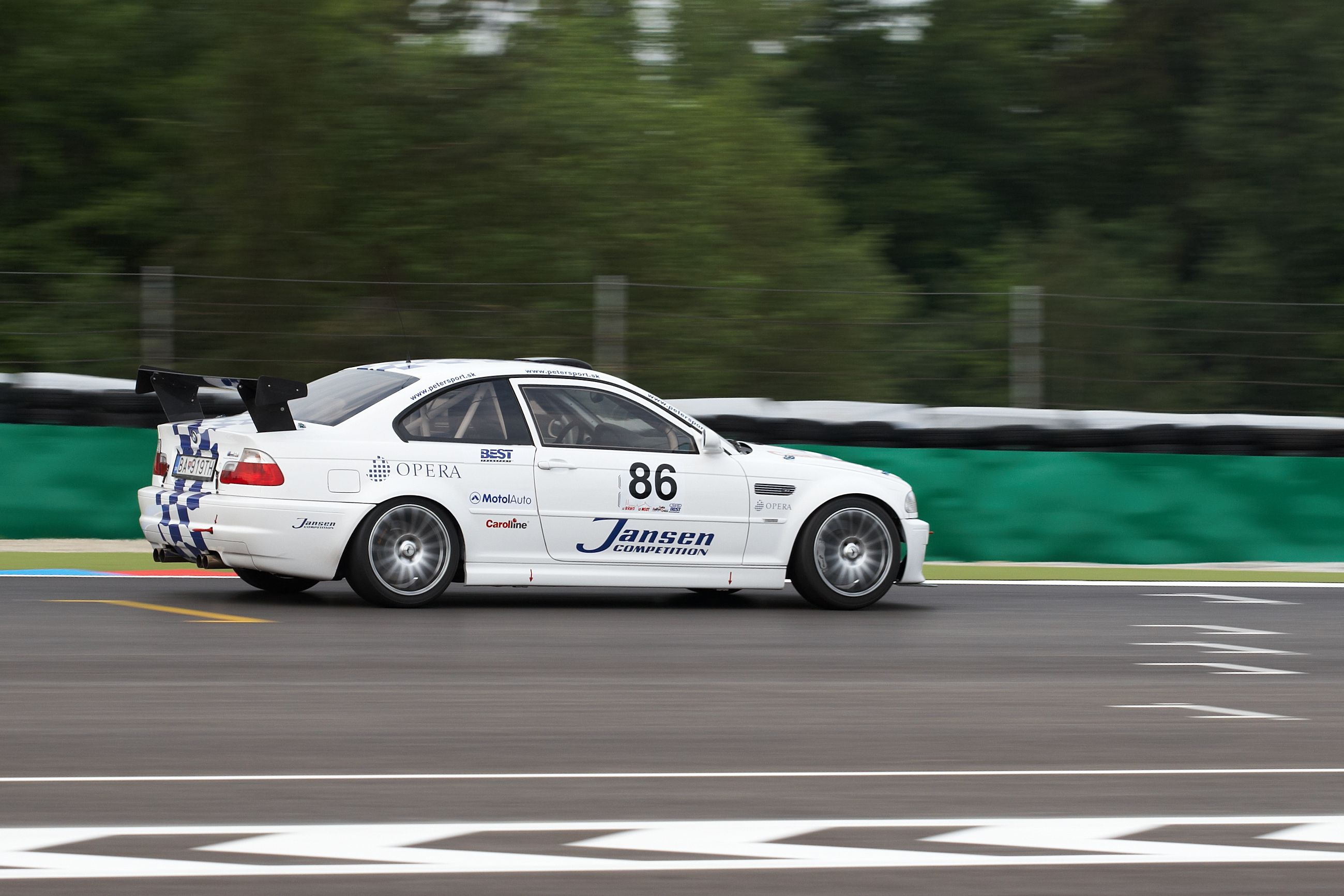
Image of a racing car with lead room

The rule of space applies to artwork (photography, advertising, illustration) picturing objects to which the artist wants to apply the illusion of movement, or which is supposed to create a contextual bubble in the viewer's mind.

This can be achieved, for instance, by leaving white space in the direction the eyes of a portrayed person are looking, or, when picturing a runner, adding white space in front of him rather than behind him to indicate movement. Studies with naive participants have confirmed this preference.

=== Simplification ===
Images with clutter can distract from the main elements within the picture and make it difficult to identify the subject. By decreasing the extraneous content, the viewer is more likely to focus on the primary objects. Clutter can also be reduced through the use of lighting, as the brighter areas of the image tend to draw the eye, as do lines, squares and colour. In painting, the artist may use less detailed and defined brushwork towards the edges of the picture. Removing the elements to the focus of the object, taking only the needed components.

==== Shallow depth of field ====
In photography, and also (via software simulation of real lens limitations) in 3D graphics, one approach to achieving simplification is to use a wide aperture when shooting to limit the depth of field. When used properly in the right setting, this technique can place everything that is not the subject of the photograph out of focus.

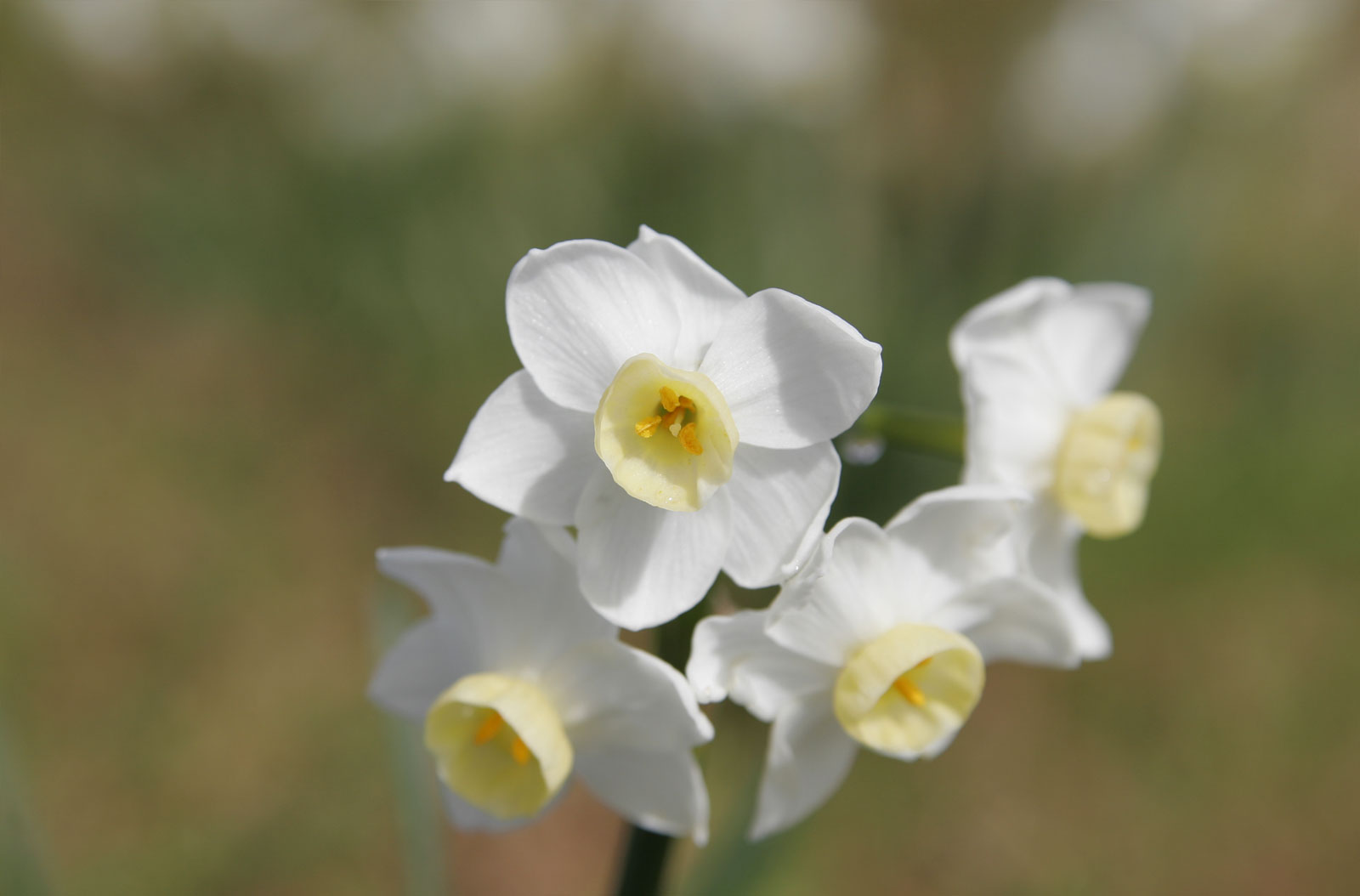
The blurred background focuses the eye on the flowers.

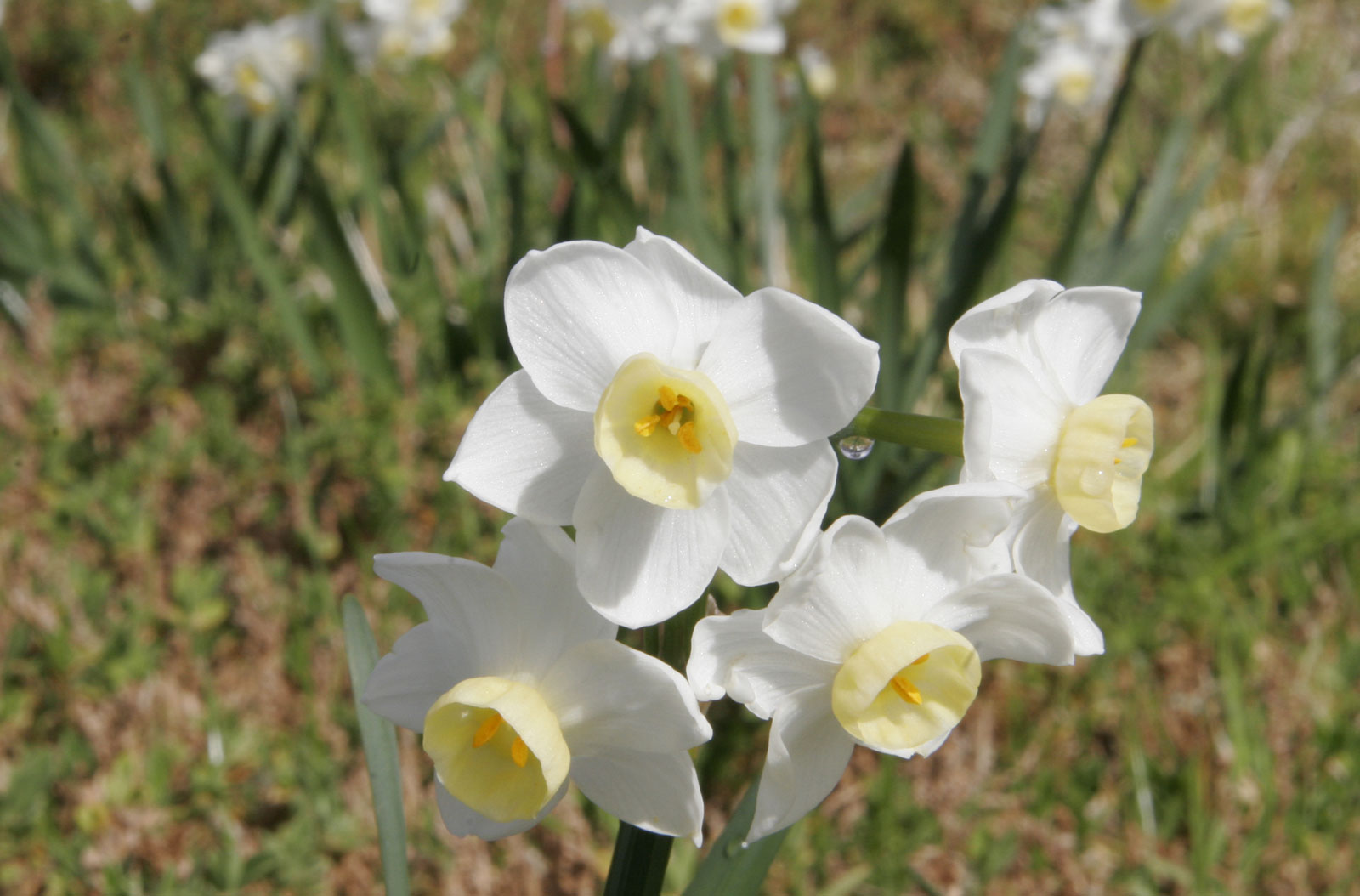
At a smaller aperture, the background competes for the viewer's attention.

A similar approach, given the right equipment, is to take advantage of the Scheimpflug principle to change the plane of focus.

=== Geometry and symmetry ===
A simple composition with cloud and rooftop that creates asymmetry.

Related to the rule of odds is the observation that triangles are an aesthetically pleasing implied shape within an image. In a canonically attractive face, the mouth and eyes fall within the corners of the area of an equilateral triangle. Paul Cézanne successfully used triangles in his compositions of still lifes. A triangular format creates a sense of stability and strength.

=== Creating movement ===
It is generally thought to be more pleasing to the viewer if the image encourages the eye to move around the image, rather than immediately fixating on a single place or no place in particular. Artists will often strive to avoid creating compositions that feel "static" or "flat" by incorporating movement into the image. In image A the 2 mountains are equally sized and positioned beside each other creating a very static and uninteresting image. In image B the mountains are differently sized and one is placed closer to the horizon, guiding the eye to move from one mountain to the other creating a more interesting and pleasing image. This also feels more natural because in nature objects are rarely the same size and evenly spaced.

Image A

Image B

=== Other techniques ===
- There should be a center of interest or focus in the work, to prevent it becoming a pattern in itself
- The direction followed by the viewer's eye should lead the viewer's gaze around all elements in the work before leading out of the picture
- The subject should not be facing out of the image
- Exact bisections of the picture space should be avoided
- Small, high contrast, elements have as much impact as larger, duller elements
- The prominent subject should be off-centre, unless a symmetrical or formal composition is desired, and can be balanced by smaller satellite elements
- The horizon line should not divide the art work in two equal parts but be positioned to emphasize either the sky or ground; showing more sky if painting is of clouds, sun rise/set, and more ground if a landscape
- Use of detailed areas and 'rest' areas can help to aid the eye in where to look. Creating a contrast between detail and lack of detail is important

These principles can be means of a good composition yet they cannot be applied separately but should act together to form a good composition.

- Also in an artwork, it is suggested that no spaces between the objects should be the same to create a more interesting image.

== Example ==
These paintings all show the same subject, the Raising of Lazarus, and essentially the same figures, but have very different compositions:

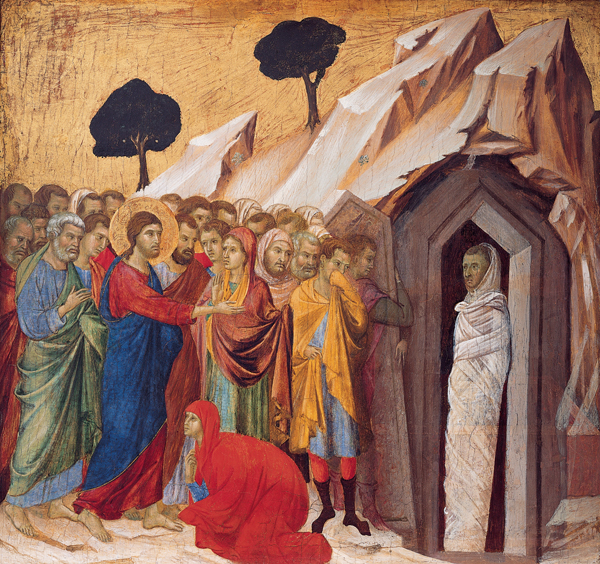
Duccio, 1310–11

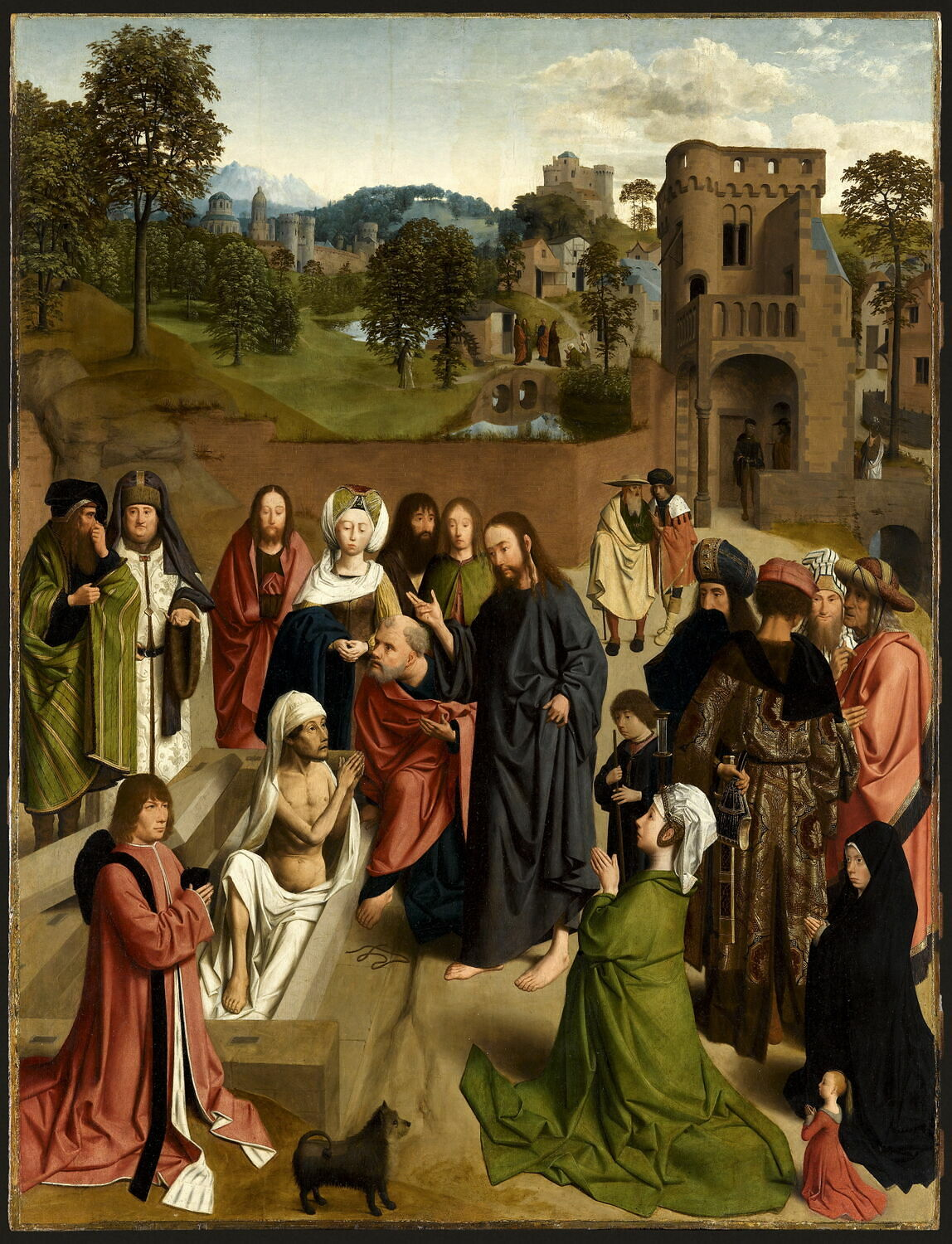
Geertgen tot Sint Jans, 1480s

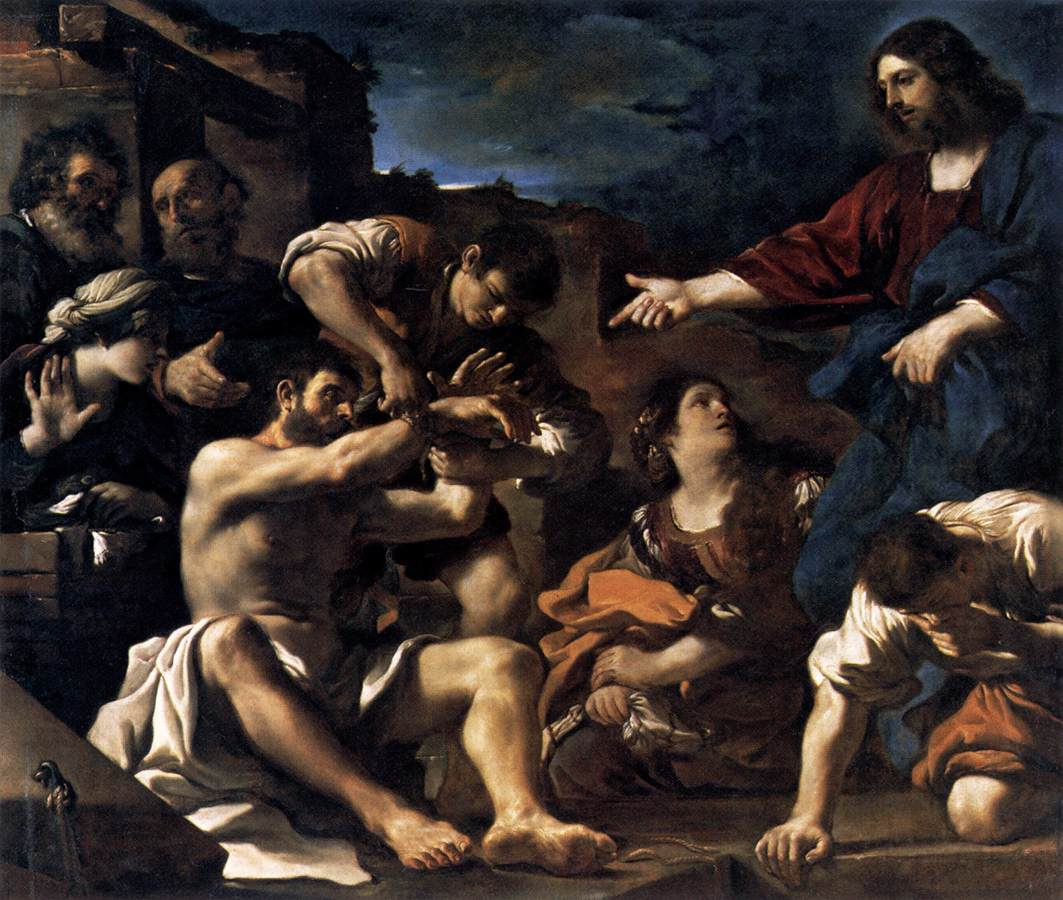
Guercino, c. 1619

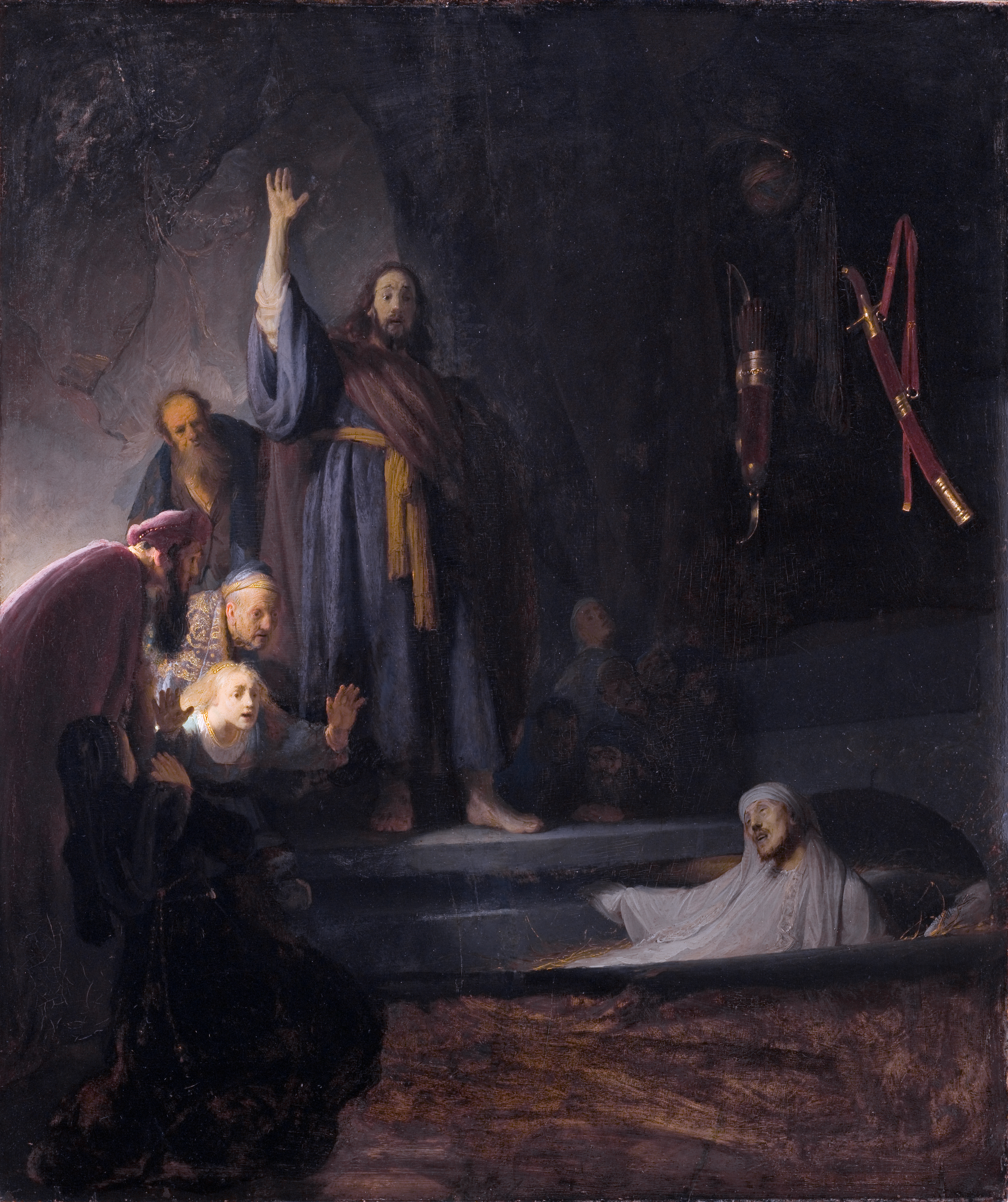
Rembrandt, c. 1630

== See also ==
- List of photographic composition techniques
- Miksang (contemplative photography)
- New Epoch Notation Painting (a notation system for painting)
- Page layout (graphic design)
