= I Am that I Am =

English translation of a Hebrew Biblical phrase

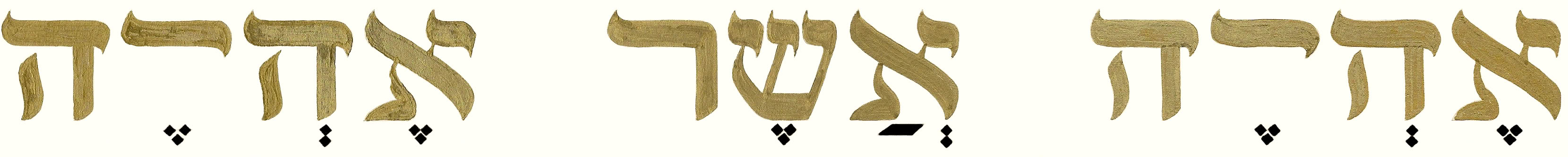
The Hebrew text with niqqud

"I Am that I Am" is a common English translation of the Hebrew phrase אֶהְיֶה אֲשֶׁר אֶהְיֶה (’ehye ’ăšer ’ehye; pronounced [ʔehˈje ʔaˈʃer ʔehˈje]), which appears in the Hebrew Bible (book of Exodus 3:14). The phrase is also translated as "I am who I am", "I am that (I) am", "I will become what I choose to become", "I am what I am", "I will be what I will be", "I create what(ever) I create", or "I am the Existing One".

== Etymology ==
Ehyeh-Asher-Ehyeh

אֶהְיֶה אֲשֶׁר אֶהְיֶה (’ehye ’ăšer ’ehye) is the first of three responses given to Moses when he asks for God's name in Exodus 3:13-15. The word אֶהְיֶה (’Ehyeh) is the first person singular imperfective form of הָיָה (hayah), 'to be', and owing to the peculiarities of Hebrew grammar can mean both 'I am' and 'I will be'. The meaning of the longer phrase ’ehyeh ’ăšer ’ehyeh is debated, and might be seen as a promise ('I will be with you') or as statement of incomparability ('I am without equal').

Grammatical tense in Biblical Hebrew was purely aspectual rather than temporal; that is to say, verbs did not morphologically indicate when they happened, only whether they were complete. The perfect tense denoted any actions that have been completed, and imperfect denoted any actions that are not yet completed. Additionally, if a verb form was prefixed by וַ- (wa-), its aspect was inverted; a verb conjugated in the imperfect and prefixed by וַ- would read as the perfect, while a verb conjugated in the perfect and prefixed by וַ- would read as the imperfect. The word אֶהְיֶה (ehyeh) is the first-person singular imperfect form of hayah, 'to be', which in Modern Hebrew indicates the future tense 'I will be'; however, it lacks the prefix וַ- which would necessitate this reading in Biblical Hebrew.

In English, it is necessary to attach a time to a verb, so ehyeh must be forced into one possible meaning in translation. It therefore may be translated as 'I am', 'I was' or 'I will be', but also as a modal form such as 'I may be', 'I would be', 'I could be', etc. Likewise, the relative pronoun אֲשֶׁר (asher) can equally be 'who', 'what', 'that' or 'which'. Accordingly, since the tense system 'by no means corresponds to that of modern English', the whole phrase can be rendered in English not only as 'I am that I am' but also as 'I will be who I will be', 'I am he who endures' or 'I shall prove to be whatsoever I shall prove to be' or even 'I will be because I will be'.

The New Testament authors avoid this problem in Koine Greek translation by invoking the present, past and future each: Ἐγω εἰμι [...] ὁ ὠν και ὁ ἠν και ὁ ἐρχομενος ('I am him who is, him who was and him who comes')

Other renderings include: 'I will be that I will be' in the Leeser Bible, 'I will become whatsoever I please' in the Emphasized Bible, and 'I am Being' (Ancient Greek: ἐγώ εἰμι ὁ ὤν (Ego eimi ho on)) in the Septuagint.

The word אֲשֶׁר (’ăšer) is a relative pronoun whose meaning depends on the immediate context, therefore 'that', 'who', 'which', or 'where' are all possible translations of that word.

== Interpretation ==
According to the Hebrew Bible, in the encounter of the burning bush (Exodus 3:14), Moses asks what he is to say to the Israelites when they ask what gods ('Elohiym) have sent him to them, and YHWH replies, "Ehyeh Asher Ehyeh" – which has been translated as "I am who I am" – adding, "Say this to the people of Israel, 'I am has sent me to you'". Having told Moses to say that to the Israelites, YHWH then instructs him to say the following, "YHWH Elohim of your ancestors, the Elohim of Abraham, Isaac, and Jacob, has sent me to you. This is my name forever. This is my title throughout every generation." Despite this exchange, the Israelites are never written to have asked Moses for the name of God. Then there are a number of probably unanswerable questions, including who it is that does not know God's name, Moses or the Israelites (most commentators take it that it is Moses who does not know, meaning that the Israelites will ask him the name in order to prove his credentials), and just what the statement means.

The last can be approached in three ways:

- "I am who I am" – an evasion of Moses' question;
- "I am I that am" or "I am he who is" – a statement of the nature of Israel's God, and thus his true name. Scholars believe it refers to God's eternal nature, which is common in ancient Near Eastern cultures and not restricted to Hellenistic philosophy. It might be a reaction to the motif of gods arbitrarily disappearing in Canaanite mythology;
- "'I Am' is who I am", or "I am because I am" – this version has not played a major part in scholarly discussion of the phrase, but the first variant has been incorporated into the New English Bible.
- The threefold New Testament interpretation given in Revelation 1:8 indicates a first-century understanding of 'ehyeh asher ehyeh' to describe the eternity of the God of Israel. Christians have also long interpreted this tripartite self-description as relating to Trinitarian theology.

== Roman Catholicism ==
Augustine of Hippo and Thomas Aquinas, Doctors of the Church, identified the Being of Exodus 3:14 with the Esse ipsum subsistens (Latin), who is God himself, and, in metaphysics, the Being in the strong or intensive sense in whom one has all the determinations of every being in their highest degree of perfection. Therefore, this Being is actuality of every actuality (or pure Act) and perfection of all perfections. In Him, solely essence and existence (Latin: Actus essendi) are identified. While St. Augustine had a general intuition of Him, His philosophical formulation came only with St. Aquinas.

== Other views ==
The South Indian sage Ramana Maharshi mentions that of all the definitions of God, "none is indeed so well put as the biblical statement 'I am that I am'". He maintained that although Hindu scripture contains similar statements, the Mahavakyas, these are not as direct as given in the Hebrew Bible’s Book of Exodus. Further the "I am" is explained by Sri Nisargadatta Maharaj as an abstraction in the mind of the Stateless State, of the Absolute, or the Supreme Reality, called Parabrahman: it is pure awareness, prior to thoughts, free from perceptions, associations, memories. Parabrahman is often considered to be a cognate term for the Supreme Being in Hinduism.

Victor P. Hamilton suggests "some legitimate translations ..: (1) 'I am who I am'; (2) 'I am who I was'; (3) 'I am who I shall be'; (4) 'I was who I am'; (5) 'I was who I was'; (6) 'I was who I shall be'; (7) 'I shall be who I am'; (8) 'I shall be who I was'; (9) 'I shall be who I shall be'."

The Bahá'í Faith reference to "I Am" can be found on page 316 of The Dawn-Breakers:

"I am," thrice exclaimed the Báb, "I am, I am, the promised One! I am the One whose name you have for a thousand years invoked, at whose mention you have risen, whose advent you have longed to witness, and the hour of whose Revelation you have prayed God to hasten. Verily I say, it is incumbent upon the peoples of both the East and the West to obey My word and to pledge allegiance to My person."

== See also ==
- Be, and it is
- Cogito, ergo sum
- Ego eimi
- I am (biblical term)
- Names of God
- Names of God in Islam
- Self-reference
- Tat Tvam Asi
- Unmoved mover
- Tanya (Judaism)
