= Tetractys =

Symbol of ten points laid in four rows

The tetractys

The tetractys (Greek: τετρακτύς), or tetrad, or the tetractys of the decad is a triangular figure consisting of ten points arranged in four rows: one, two, three, and four points in each row, which is the geometrical representation of the fourth triangular number. As a mystical symbol, it was very important to the secret worship of Pythagoreanism. There were four seasons, and the number was also associated with planetary motions and music.

== Pythagorean symbol ==
1. The first four numbers symbolize the musica universalis and the Cosmos as:
  1. Monad – Unity
  2. Dyad – Power – Limit/Unlimited (peras/apeiron)
  3. Triad – Harmony
  4. Tetrad – Kosmos
2. The four rows add up to ten, which was unity of a higher order (The Dekad).
3. The Tetractys symbolizes the four classical elements—air, fire, water, and earth.
4. The Tetractys represented the organization of space:
  1. the first row represented zero dimensions (a point)
  2. the second row represented one dimension (a line of two points)
  3. the third row represented two dimensions (a plane defined by a triangle of three points)
  4. the fourth row represented three dimensions (a tetrahedron defined by four points)

A prayer of the Pythagoreans shows the importance of the Tetractys (sometimes called the "Mystic Tetrad"), as the prayer was addressed to it.

Bless us, divine number, thou who generated gods and men! O holy, holy Tetractys, thou that containest the root and source of the eternally flowing creation! For the divine number begins with the profound, pure unity until it comes to the holy four; then it begets the mother of all, the all-comprising, all-bounding, the first-born, the never-swerving, the never-tiring holy ten, the keyholder of all.

The Pythagorean oath also mentioned the Tetractys:

By that pure, holy, four lettered name on high,
nature's eternal fountain and supply,
the parent of all souls that living be,
by him, with faith find oath, I swear to thee.

It is said that the Pythagorean musical system was based on the Tetractys as the rows can be read as the ratios of 4:3 (perfect fourth), 3:2 (perfect fifth), 2:1 (octave), forming the basic intervals of the Pythagorean scales. That is, Pythagorean scales are generated from combining pure fourths (in a 4:3 relation), pure fifths (in a 3:2 relation), and the simple ratios of the unison 1:1 and the octave 2:1. Note that the diapason, 2:1 (octave), and the diapason plus diapente, 3:1 (compound fifth or perfect twelfth), are consonant intervals according to the tetractys of the decad, but that the diapason plus diatessaron, 8:3 (compound fourth or perfect eleventh), is not.

The Tetractys [also known as the decad] is an equilateral triangle formed from the sequence of the first ten numbers aligned in four rows. It is both a mathematical idea and a metaphysical symbol that embraces within itself—in seedlike form—the principles of the natural world, the harmony of the cosmos, the ascent to the divine, and the mysteries of the divine realm. So revered was this ancient symbol that it inspired ancient philosophers to swear by the name of the one who brought this gift to humanity.

== Kabbalist symbol ==
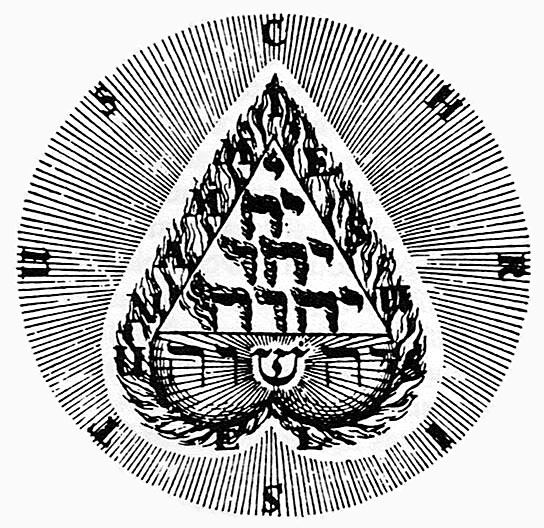
Symbol by early 17th-century Christian mystic Jakob Böhme, including a tetractys of flaming Hebrew letters of the Tetragrammaton.

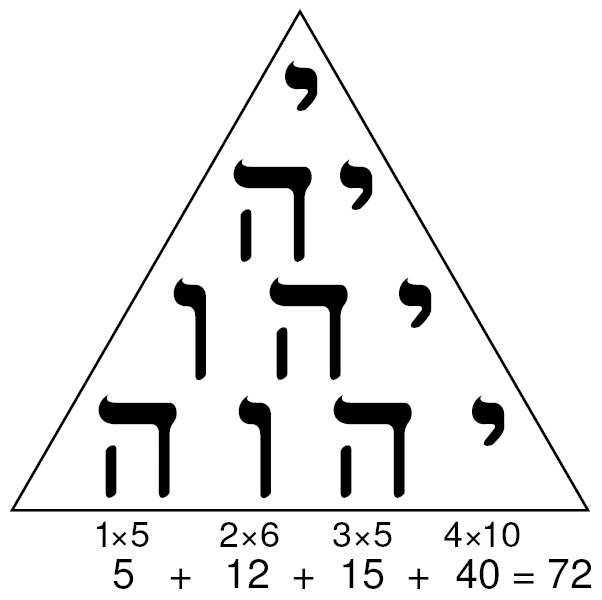
A tetractys of the letters of the Tetragrammaton adds up to 72 by gematria.

In the work by anthropologist Raphael Patai entitled The Hebrew Goddess, the author argues that the tetractys and its mysteries influenced the early Kabbalah. A Hebrew tetractys has the letters of the Tetragrammaton inscribed on the ten positions of the tetractys, from right to left. It has been argued that the Kabbalistic Tree of Life, with its ten spheres of emanation, is in some way connected to the tetractys, but its form is not that of a triangle. The occultist Dion Fortune writes:

The point is assigned to Kether;
the line to Chokmah;
the two-dimensional plane to Binah;
consequently the three-dimensional solid naturally falls to Chesed.

The relationship between geometrical shapes and the first four Sephirot is analogous to the geometrical correlations in Tetraktys, shown above under #Pythagorean symbol, and unveils the relevance of the Tree of Life with the Tetraktys.

== Occurrence ==
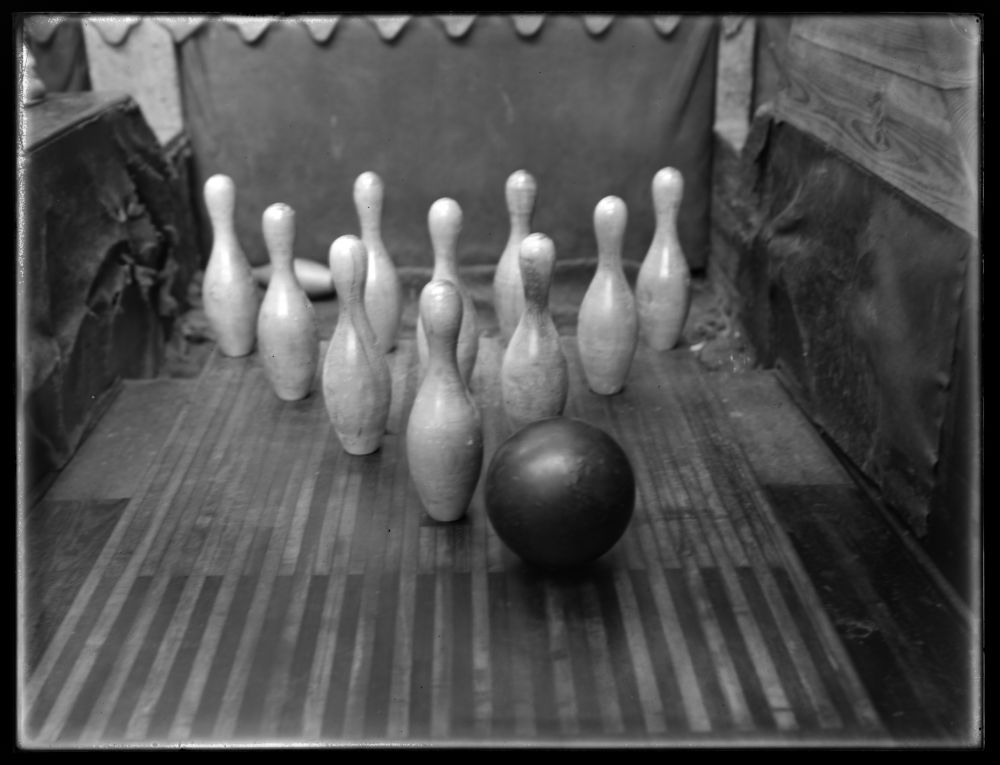
Ten-pin bowling pins in a tetractys

Coat of arms of an archbishop of the Catholic Church

The tetractys occurs (generally coincidentally) in the following:

- the baryon decuplet
- an archbishop's coat of arms
- the arrangement of bowling pins in ten-pin bowling
- the arrangement of billiard balls in ten-ball pool
- a Chinese checkers board
- the "Christmas Tree" formation in association football

== In poetry ==
In English-language poetry, a tetractys is a syllable-counting form with five lines. The first line has one syllable, the second has two syllables, the third line has three syllables, the fourth line has four syllables, and the fifth line has ten syllables. A sample tetractys would look like this:

Mantrum
Your /
fury /
confuses /
us all greatly. /
Volatile, big-bodied tots are selfish. //

The tetractys was created by Ray Stebbing, who said the following about his newly created form:

"The tetractys could be Britain's answer to the haiku. Its challenge is to express a complete thought, profound or comic, witty or wise, within the narrow compass of twenty syllables.

== See also ==
- Pascal's triangle
