= Actus purus =

Absolute perfection of God, in Christian theology

In scholastic philosophy, Actus Purus (Latin for 'Pure Actuality' / 'Pure Act') is the absolute perfection of God.

== Overview ==
Created beings have potentiality that is not actuality, imperfections as well as perfection. Only God is simultaneously all that he can be, infinitely real and infinitely perfect: 'I Am that I Am' (Exodus 3:14). His attributes or his operations are really identical with his essence, and his essence necessitates his existence. (Contrast this understanding with the Essence–Energies distinction in Eastern Christianity, particularly Palamite, theology).

Charles Albert Dubray, as accepted by Charles George Herbermann, stated that in created beings,

the state of potentiality precedes that of actuality; before being realized, a perfection must be capable of realization. But, absolutely speaking, actuality precedes potentiality. For in order to change, a thing must be acted upon, or actualized; change and potentiality presuppose, therefore, a being which is in actu. This actuality, if mixed with potentiality, presupposes another actuality, and so on, until we reach the actus purus.

According to Thomas Aquinas, a thing which requires completion by another is said to be in potency to that other: realization of potency is called actuality. The universe is conceived of as a series of things arranged in an ascending order, or potency and act at once crowned and created by God, who alone is pure act. God is changeless because change means passage from potency to act, and so he is without beginning and end, since these demand change. Matter and form are necessary to the understanding of change, for change requires the union of that which becomes and that which it becomes. Matter is the first, and form the second. All physical things are composed of matter and form. The difference between a thing as form or character and the actual existence of it is denoted by the terms essence and being (or existence). It is only in God that there is no distinction between the two. Both pairs – matter and form, essence and being – are special cases of potency and act. They are also modes: modes do not add anything to the idea of being, but are ways of making explicit what is implicit in it.

== Common Being and Being as Pure Act ==
According to Thomas Aquinas, God can also be defined as the act of all acts, the perfection of all perfections and the perfect Being. This Being is also called being in the strong sense or intensive Being (Esse ut actus, or Actus essendi) to distinguish it from being in the weak sense or common being (esse commune) of all created entities. The intensive Being includes every possible determination, thus excludes any other addition, is the highest real perfection; the common being is the highest abstraction and the lowest perfection, universal and totally indeterminate, indifferent to any addition (which neither excludes nor even includes).

The common being is the object of metaphysics, which studies being as being in the universal manner.

According to Fr Battista Mondin, the common being is also analogical, like the intensive Being. Otherwise, if the common being were to be preached unambiguously, all entities would be reduced to a single entity. God cannot coincide with the common being because it would be reduced to a mere abstraction existing in the human mind alone.

While the common being is immanent like all the entities which it is abstracted from, instead the intensive Being, who is God Himself, is transcendent. Both of them are transcendental in respect of the nine Aristotelian categories.

A univocal common being is the object of the philosophies of Parmenides and Plato, as well as of Scotus, Suárez, and Wolff. An immanent Being is the object of the philosophies of Plotinus, Spinoza, Hegel and Heidegger.

The most perfect Being (or Esse ipsum subsistens, Being that subsists by itself and not in virtue of other-from-itself), is as strong and powerful, intelligent and free, noble and precious, profound and intimate to creatures, as nobody else can exist.

== See also ==
- Actual idealism
- Actus essendi
- Hyperuranion
- Thomism
- Avicennism
