= Actus essendi =

Latin phrase meaning "act of being"

Actus essendi is a Latin phrase meaning "act of being," introduced by the 13th-century philosopher and theologian Thomas Aquinas (1225–1274). It refers to what Aquinas saw as the most fundamental metaphysical principle: the act by which something actually exists. In his system of thought, heavily influenced by Aristotle and Christian Neoplatonism, Aquinas distinguishes between a being’s essence (what a thing is) and its existence (that a thing is). The actus essendi is the principle that gives existence to essence—it is what makes any created thing real, rather than merely possible.

Aquinas links this principle to the biblical revelation of God as He Who Is (Exodus 3:14), interpreting God's identity as pure being itself. Unlike created beings, whose essence and existence are distinct, God is identical with His own act of being. For Aquinas, this means God's essence cannot be known directly through sensory experience. Instead, we come to understand God only indirectly—through limited participations in His actus essendi, that is, through the reality of created beings, which reflect God's sustaining presence. Aquinas describes the actus essendi as "the act of all acts, the perfection of all perfections", and as "a proper effect of God".

== See also ==
- Actus purus
