= Potentiality and actuality =

Principles in the philosophy of Aristotle

In philosophy, potentiality and actuality are a pair of closely connected principles which Aristotle used to analyze motion, causality, ethics, and physiology in his Physics, Metaphysics, Nicomachean Ethics, and On the Soul. In this context, the concept of potentiality generally refers to any "possibility" that a thing can be said to have. Aristotle did not consider all possibilities the same, and emphasized the importance of those that become real of their own accord when conditions are right and nothing stops them. In contrast to potentiality, actuality is the motion, change or activity that represents an exercise or fulfillment of a possibility, when a possibility becomes real in the fullest sense.

Potentiality and actuality reflect Aristotle's belief that events in nature are not all natural in a true sense. As he saw it, many things happen accidentally, and therefore not according to the natural purposes of things. These concepts, in modified forms, remained very important into the Middle Ages, influencing the development of medieval theology in several ways. In modern times the dichotomy has gradually lost importance, as understandings of nature and deity have changed. However the terminology has also been adapted to new uses, as is most obvious in words like energy and dynamic. These were words first used in modern physics by the German scientist and philosopher, Gottfried Wilhelm Leibniz. More controversially, Aristotle's concept of entelechy retains influence on occasional calls for the use of "entelechy" in biology.

== Potentiality ==
"Potentiality" and "potency" are translations of the Ancient Greek word dunamis (δύναμις). They refer especially to the way the word is used by Aristotle, as a concept contrasting with "actuality". The Latin translation of dunamis is potentia, which is the root of the English word "potential"; it is also sometimes used in English-language philosophical texts. In early modern philosophy, English authors like Hobbes and Locke used the English power as their translation of Latin potentia.

Dunamis is an ordinary Greek word for possibility or capability. Depending on the context, it could be translated as "potency", "potential", "capacity", "ability", "power", "capability", "strength", "possibility", or "force", and is the root of modern English words dynamic, dynamite, and dynamo. In his philosophy, Aristotle distinguished two meanings of the word dunamis. According to his understanding of nature there was both a weak sense of potential, meaning simply that something "might chance to happen or not to happen", and a stronger sense, to indicate how something could be done well. For example, "sometimes we say that those who can merely take a walk, or speak, without doing it as well as they intended, cannot speak or walk." This stronger sense is mainly said of the potentials of living things, although it is also sometimes used for things like musical instruments.

Throughout his works, Aristotle clearly distinguishes things that are stable or persistent, which hold their own strong natural tendency to a specific type of change, from things that appear to occur by chance. He treats these as having a different and more real existence. "Natures which persist" are said by him to be one of the causes of all things, while natures that do not persist, "might often be slandered as not being at all by one who fixes his thinking sternly upon it as upon a criminal." The potencies which persist in a particular material are one way of describing "the nature itself" of that material, an innate source of motion and rest within that material. In terms of Aristotle's theory of four causes, a material's non-accidental potential is the material cause of the things that can come to be from that material, and one part of how we can understand the substance (ousia, sometimes translated as "thinghood") of any separate thing. (As emphasized by Aristotle, this requires his distinction between accidental causes and natural causes.) According to Aristotle, when we refer to the nature of a thing, we are referring to the form or shape of a thing, which was already present as a potential, an innate tendency to change, in that material before it achieved that form. When things are most "fully at work" we can see more fully what kind of thing they really are.

== Actuality ==
Actuality is often used to translate both energeia (ἐνέργεια) and entelecheia (ἐντελέχεια) (sometimes rendered in English as entelechy). Actuality comes from Latin actualitas and is a traditional translation, but its normal meaning in Latin is 'anything which is currently happening.' The two words energeia and entelecheia were coined by Aristotle, and he stated that their meanings were intended to converge. In practice, most commentators and translators consider the two words to be interchangeable. They both refer to something being in its own type of action or at work, as all things are when they are real in the fullest sense, and not just potentially real. For example, "to be a rock is to strain to be at the center of the universe, and thus to be in motion unless constrained otherwise."

=== Energeia ===
Energeia is a word based upon ἔργον (ergon), meaning 'work'. It is the source of the modern word energy but the term has evolved so much over the course of the history of science that reference to the modern term is not very helpful in understanding the original as used by Aristotle. It is difficult to translate his use of energeia into English with consistency. Joe Sachs renders it with the phrase "being-at-work" and says that "we might construct the word is-at-work-ness from Anglo-Saxon roots to translate energeia into English".

Aristotle says the word can be made clear by looking at examples rather than trying to find a definition. Two examples of energeiai in Aristotle's works are pleasure and happiness (eudaimonia). Pleasure is an energeia of the human body and mind whereas happiness is more simply the energeia of a human being a human. Kinesis, translated as movement, motion, or in some contexts change, is also explained by Aristotle as a particular type of energeia. See below.

=== Entelechy (entelechia) ===
Entelechy, in Greek entelécheia, was coined by Aristotle and transliterated in Latin as entelechia. According to Sachs (1995, p. 245):

Aristotle invents the word by combining entelēs (ἐντελής, 'complete, full-grown') with echein (= hexis, to be a certain way by the continuing effort of holding on in that condition), while at the same time punning on endelecheia (ἐνδελέχεια, 'persistence') by inserting telos (τέλος, 'completion'). This is a three-ring circus of a word, at the heart of everything in Aristotle's thinking, including the definition of motion.

Sachs therefore proposed a complex neologism of his own, "being-at-work-staying-the-same." Another translation in recent years is "being-at-an-end", which Sachs also used.

Entelecheia, as can be seen by its derivation, is a kind of completeness, whereas "the end and completion of any genuine being is its being-at-work" (energeia). The entelecheia is a continuous being-at-work (energeia) when something is doing its complete "work". For this reason, the meanings of the two words converge, and they both depend upon the idea that every thing's "thinghood" is a kind of work, or in other words a specific way of being in motion. All things that exist now, and not just potentially, are beings-at-work, and all of them have a tendency towards being-at-work in a particular way that would be their proper and "complete" way. Sachs explains the convergence of energeia and entelecheia as follows, and uses the word actuality to describe the overlap between them:

Just as energeia extends to entelecheia because it is the activity which makes a thing what it is, entelecheia extends to energeia because it is the end or perfection which has being only in, through, and during activity.

== Motion ==
Aristotle discusses motion (kinēsis) in his Physics quite differently from modern science. Aristotle's definition of motion is closely connected to his actuality-potentiality distinction. Taken literally, Aristotle defines motion as the actuality (entelecheia) of a "potentiality as such". What Aristotle meant however is the subject of several different interpretations. A major difficulty comes from the fact that the terms actuality and potentiality, linked in this definition, are normally understood within Aristotle as opposed to each other. On the other hand, the "as such" is important and is explained at length by Aristotle, giving examples of "potentiality as such". For example, the motion of building is the energeia of the dunamis of the building materials as building materials as opposed to anything else they might become, and this potential in the unbuilt materials is referred to by Aristotle as "the buildable". So the motion of building is the actualization of "the buildable" and not the actualization of a house as such, nor the actualization of any other possibility which the building materials might have had.

Building materials have different potentials. One is that they can be built with.	Building is one motion that had been a potential in the building material. So it is the energeia or putting into action, of the building materials as building materials.	A house is built, and no longer moving.

In an influential 1969 paper, Aryeh Kosman divided up previous attempts to explain Aristotle's definition into two types, criticised them, and then gave his own third interpretation. While this has not become a consensus, it has been described as having become "orthodox". This and similar more recent publications are the basis of the following summary.

=== "Process" interpretation ===
Kosman (1969) and Coope (2009) associate this approach with W. D. Ross. Sachs (2005) points out that it was also the interpretation of Averroes and Maimonides. This interpretation is, to use the words of Ross that "it is the passage to actuality that is kinesis" as opposed to any potentiality being an actuality. Opponents argue that this interpretation requires Ross to assert that Aristotle actually used his own word entelecheia wrongly, or inconsistently, only within his definition, making it mean "actualization", which is in conflict with Aristotle's normal use of words. According to Sachs (2005) this explanation also can't account for the "as such" in Aristotle's definition.

=== "Product" interpretation ===
Sachs (2005) associates this interpretation with Thomas Aquinas and explains that by this explanation "the apparent contradiction between potentiality and actuality in Aristotle's definition of motion" is resolved "by arguing that in every motion actuality and potentiality are mixed or blended." Motion is therefore "the actuality of any potentiality insofar as it is still a potentiality." Or in other words:

The Thomistic blend of actuality and potentiality has the characteristic that, to the extent that it is actual it is not potential and to the extent that it is potential it is not actual; the hotter the water is, the less is it potentially hot, and the cooler it is, the less is it actually, the more potentially, hot.

As with the first interpretation however, Sachs (2005) objects that:

One implication of this interpretation is that whatever happens to be the case right now is an entelechia, as though something that is intrinsically unstable as the instantaneous position of an arrow in flight deserved to be described by the word that everywhere else Aristotle reserves for complex organized states that persist, that hold out against internal and external causes that try to destroy them.

In a more recent paper on this subject, Kosman associates the view of Aquinas with those of his own critics, David Charles, Jonathan Beere, and Robert Heineman.

=== Interpretation of Kosman, Coope, Sachs, and others ===
Sachs (2005), amongst other authors (such as Aryeh Kosman and Ursula Coope), proposes that the solution to problems interpreting Aristotle's definition must be found in the distinction Aristotle makes between two different types of potentiality, with only one of those corresponding to the "potentiality as such" appearing in the definition of motion. He writes:

The man with sight, but with his eyes closed, differs from the blind man, although neither is seeing. The first man has the capacity to see, which the second man lacks. There are then potentialities as well as actualities in the world. But when the first man opens his eyes, has he lost the capacity to see? Obviously not; while he is seeing, his capacity to see is no longer merely a potentiality, but is a potentiality which has been put to work. The potentiality to see exists sometimes as active or at-work, and sometimes as inactive or latent.

Coming to motion, Sachs gives the example of a man walking across the room and explains as follows:

- "Once he has reached the other side of the room, his potentiality to be there has been actualized in Ross' sense of the term". This is a type of energeia. However, it is not a motion, and not relevant to the definition of motion.
- While a man is walking his potentiality to be on the other side of the room is actual just as a potentiality, or in other words the potential as such is an actuality. "The actuality of the potentiality to be on the other side of the room, as just that potentiality, is neither more nor less than the walking across the room."

Sachs (1995, pp. 78–79), in his commentary of Aristotle's Physics Book III gives the following results from his understanding of Aristotle's definition of motion:

The genus of which motion is a species is being-at-work-staying-itself (entelecheia), of which the only other species is thinghood. The being-at-work-staying-itself of a potency (dunamis), as material, is thinghood. The being-at-work-staying-the-same of a potency as a potency is motion.

== Importance of actuality in Aristotle's philosophy ==
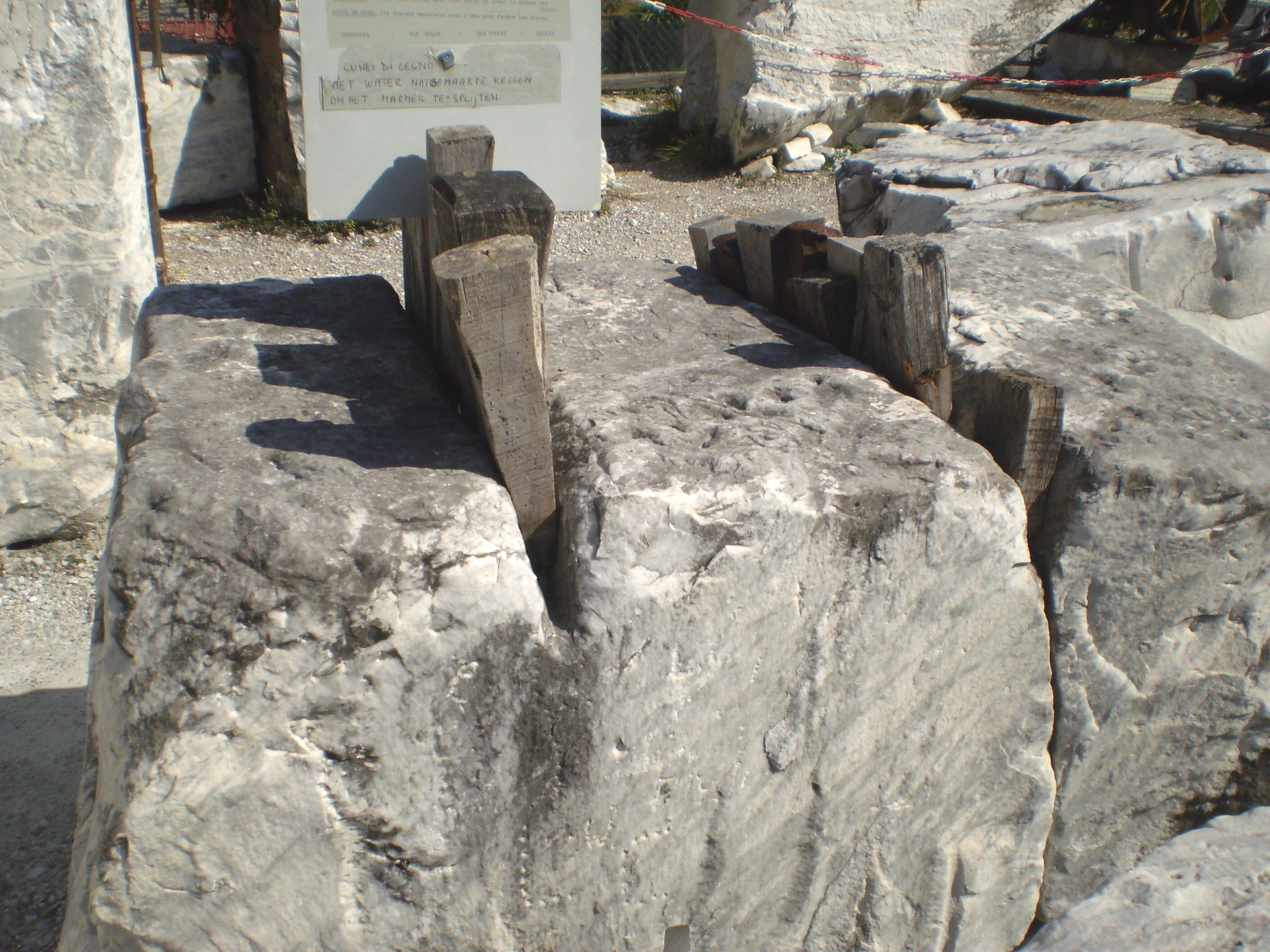
A marble block in Carrara. Could there be a particular sculpture already existing in it as a potentiality? Aristotle wrote approvingly of such ways of talking, and felt it reflected a type of causation in nature which is often ignored in scientific discussion.

The actuality-potentiality distinction in Aristotle is a key element linked to everything in his physics and metaphysics. Aristotle describes potentiality and actuality, or potency and action, as one of several distinctions between things that exist or do not exist. In a sense, a thing that exists potentially does not exist; but, the potential does exist. This type of distinction is expressed for several different types of being within Aristotle's categories of being. For example, from Aristotle's Metaphysics, 1017a:

- We speak of an entity being a "seeing" thing whether it is currently seeing or just able to see.
- We speak of someone having understanding, whether they are using that understanding or not.
- We speak of corn existing in a field even when it is not yet ripe.
- People sometimes speak of a figure being already present in a rock which could be sculpted to represent that figure.

Within the works of Aristotle the terms energeia and entelecheia, often translated as actuality, differ from what is merely actual because they specifically presuppose that all things have a proper kind of activity or work which, if achieved, would be their proper end. Greek for end in this sense is telos, a component word in entelecheia (a work that is the proper end of a thing) and also teleology. This is an aspect of Aristotle's theory of four causes and specifically of formal cause (eidos, which Aristotle says is energeia) and final cause (telos).

In essence this means that Aristotle did not see things as matter in motion only, but also proposed that all things have their own aims or ends. In other words, for Aristotle (unlike modern science), there is a distinction between things with a natural cause in the strongest sense, and things that truly happen by accident. He also distinguishes non-rational from rational potentialities (e.g. the capacity to heat and the capacity to play the flute, respectively), pointing out that the latter require desire or deliberate choice for their actualization. Because of this style of reasoning, Aristotle is often referred to as having a teleology, and sometimes as having a theory of forms.

While actuality is linked by Aristotle to his concept of a formal cause, potentiality (or potency) on the other hand, is linked by Aristotle to his concepts of hylomorphic matter and material cause. Aristotle wrote for example that "matter exists potentially, because it may attain to the form; but when it exists actually, it is then in the form." Teleology is a crucial concept throughout Aristotle's philosophy. This means that as well as its central role in his physics and metaphysics, the potentiality-actuality distinction has a significant influence on other areas of Aristotle's thought such as his ethics, biology and psychology.

== Active intellect ==
The active intellect was a concept Aristotle described that requires an understanding of the actuality-potentiality dichotomy. Aristotle described this in his De Anima (Book 3, Chapter 5, 430a10-25) and covered similar ground in his Metaphysics (Book 12, Chapter 7-10). The following is from the De Anima, translated by Joe Sachs, with some parenthetic notes about the Greek. The passage tries to explain "how the human intellect passes from its original state, in which it does not think, to a subsequent state, in which it does." He inferred that the energeia/dunamis distinction must also exist in the soul itself:

...since in nature one thing is the material [hulē] for each kind [genos] (this is what is in potency all the particular things of that kind) but it is something else that is the causal and productive thing by which all of them are formed, as is the case with an art in relation to its material, it is necessary in the soul [psuchē] too that these distinct aspects be present;

the one sort is intellect [nous] by becoming all things, the other sort by forming all things, in the way an active condition [hexis] like light too makes the colors that are in potency be at work as colors [to phōs poiei ta dunamei onta chrōmata energeiai chrōmata].

This sort of intellect is separate, as well as being without attributes and unmixed, since it is by its thinghood a being-at-work, for what acts is always distinguished in stature above what is acted upon, as a governing source is above the material it works on.

Knowledge [epistēmē], in its being-at-work, is the same as the thing it knows, and while knowledge in potency comes first in time in any one knower, in the whole of things it does not take precedence even in time.

This does not mean that at one time it thinks but at another time it does not think, but when separated it is just exactly what it is, and this alone is deathless and everlasting (though we have no memory, because this sort of intellect is not acted upon, while the sort that is acted upon is destructible), and without this nothing thinks.

This has been referred to as one of "the most intensely studied sentences in the history of philosophy." In the Metaphysics, Aristotle wrote at more length on a similar subject and is often understood to have equated the active intellect with being the "unmoved mover" and God. Nevertheless, as Davidson remarks:

Just what Aristotle meant by potential intellect and active intellect – terms not even explicit in the De Anima and at best implied – and just how he understood the interaction between them remains moot to this day. Students of the history of philosophy continue to debate Aristotle's intent, particularly the question whether he considered the active intellect to be an aspect of the human soul or an entity existing independently of man.

== Post-Aristotelian usage ==
=== New meanings of energeia or energy ===
Already in Aristotle's own works, the concept of a distinction between energeia and dunamis was used in many ways, for example to describe the way striking metaphors work, or human happiness. Polybius about 150 BC, in his work the Histories uses Aristotle's word energeia in both an Aristotelian way and also to describe the "clarity and vividness" of things. Diodorus Siculus in 60-30 BC used the term in a very similar way to Polybius. However, Diodorus uses the term to denote qualities unique to individuals. Using the term in ways that could translated as 'vigor' or 'energy' (in a more modern sense); for society, 'practice' or 'custom'; for a thing, 'operation' or 'working'; like vigor in action.

=== Platonism and neoplatonism ===
Already in Plato it is found implicitly the notion of potency and act in his cosmological presentation of becoming (kinēsis) and forces (dunamis), linked to the ordering intellect, mainly in the description of the Demiurge and the "Receptacle" in his Timaeus. It has also been associated to the dyad of Plato's unwritten doctrines, and is involved in the question of being and non-being since from the pre-socratics, as in Heraclitus's mobilism and Parmenides' immobilism. The mythological concept of primordial Chaos is also classically associated with a disordered prime matter (see also prima materia), which, being passive and full of potentialities, would be ordered in actual forms, as can be seen in Neoplatonism, especially in Plutarch, Plotinus, and among the Church Fathers, and the subsequent medieval and Renaissance philosophy, as in Ramon Lllull's Book of Chaos and John Milton's Paradise Lost.

Plotinus was a late classical pagan philosopher and theologian whose monotheistic re-workings of Plato and Aristotle were influential amongst early Christian theologians. In his Enneads he sought to reconcile ideas of Aristotle and Plato together with a form of monotheism, that used three fundamental metaphysical principles, which were conceived of in terms consistent with Aristotle's energeia/dunamis dichotomy, and one interpretation of his concept of the Active Intellect (discussed above):

- The Monad or "the One" sometimes also described as "the Good". This is the dunamis or possibility of existence.
- The Intellect, or Intelligence, or, to use the Greek term, Nous, which is described as God, or a Demiurge. It thinks its own contents, which are thoughts, equated to the Platonic ideas or forms (eide). The thinking of this Intellect is the highest activity of life. The actualization of this thinking is the being of the forms. This Intellect is the first principle or foundation of existence. The One is prior to it, but not in the sense that a cause is prior to an effect, but instead Intellect is called an emanation of the One. The One is the possibility of this foundation of existence.
- Soul or, to use the Greek term, Psyche. The soul is also an energeia: it acts upon or actualizes its own thoughts and creates "a separate, material cosmos that is the living image of the spiritual or noetic Cosmos contained as a unified thought within the Intelligence."

This was based largely upon Plotinus' reading of Plato, but also incorporated many Aristotelian concepts, including the unmoved mover as energeia.

=== New Testament usage ===
Other than incorporation of Neoplatonic into Christendom by early Christian theologians such as St. Augustine, the concepts of dunamis and ergon (the morphological root of energeia) are frequently used in the original Greek New Testament. Dunamis is used 119 times and ergon is used 161 times, usually with the meaning 'power/ability' and 'act/work', respectively.

=== Essence-energies debate in medieval Christian theology ===
In Eastern Orthodox Christianity, St Gregory Palamas wrote about the "energies" (actualities; singular energeia in Greek, or actus in Latin) of God in contrast to God's "essence" (ousia). These are two distinct types of existence, with God's energy being the type of existence which people can perceive, while the essence of God is outside of normal existence or non-existence or human understanding, i.e. transcendental, in that it is not caused or created by anything else. Palamas gave this explanation as part of his defense of the Eastern Orthodox ascetic practice of hesychasm. Palamism became a standard part of Orthodox dogma after 1351. In contrast, the position of Western Medieval (or Catholic) Christianity, can be found for example in the philosophy of Thomas Aquinas, who relied on Aristotle's concept of entelechy, when he defined God as actus purus, pure act, actuality unmixed with potentiality. The existence of a truly distinct essence of God which is not actuality, is not generally accepted in Catholic theology.

=== Influence on modal logic ===
The notion of possibility was greatly analyzed by medieval and modern philosophers. Aristotle's logical work in this area is considered by some to be an anticipation of modal logic and its treatment of potentiality and time. Indeed, many philosophical interpretations of possibility are related to a famous passage on Aristotle's On Interpretation, concerning the truth of the statement: "There will be a sea battle tomorrow." Contemporary philosophy regards possibility, as studied by modal metaphysics, to be an aspect of modal logic. Modal logic as a named subject owes much to the writings of the Scholastics, in particular William of Ockham and John Duns Scotus, who reasoned informally in a modal manner, mainly to analyze statements about essence and accident.

=== Influence on early modern physics ===
Aristotle's metaphysics, his account of nature and causality, was for the most part rejected by the early modern philosophers. Francis Bacon in his Novum Organon in one explanation of the case for rejecting the concept of a formal cause or "nature" for each type of thing, argued for example that philosophers must still look for formal causes but only in the sense of "simple natures" such as colour, and weight, which exist in many gradations and modes in very different types of individual bodies. In the works of Thomas Hobbes then, the traditional Aristotelian terms, "potentia et actus", are discussed, but he equates them simply to "cause and effect".

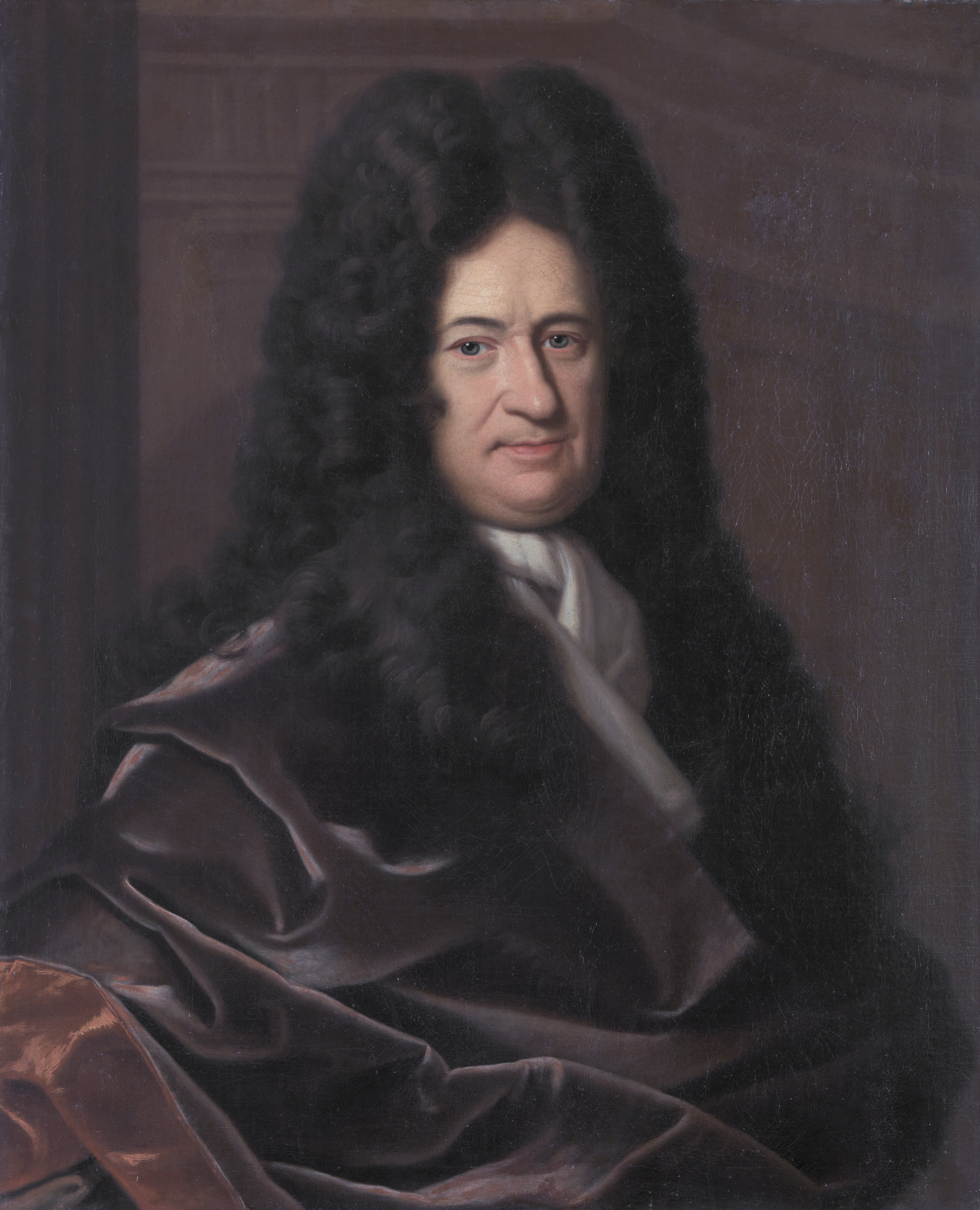
Gottfried Wilhelm Leibniz was the source of the modern adaptations of Aristotle's concepts of potentiality and actuality.

There was an adaptation of at least one aspect of Aristotle's potentiality and actuality distinction, which has become part of modern physics, although as per Bacon's approach, it is a generalized form of energy, not one connected to specific forms for specific things. The definition of energy in modern physics as the product of mass and the square of velocity, was derived by Leibniz, as a correction of Descartes, based upon Galileo's investigation of falling bodies. He preferred to refer to it as an entelecheia or 'living force' (Latin vis viva), but what he defined is today called kinetic energy, and was seen by Leibniz as a modification of Aristotle's energeia, and his concept of the potential for movement which is in things. Instead of each type of physical thing having its own specific tendency to a way of moving or change, as in Aristotle, Leibniz said that force, power, or motion itself could be transferred between things of different types, in such a way that there is a general conservation of this energy. In other words, Leibniz's modern version of entelechy or energy obeys its own laws of nature, whereas different types of things do not have their own separate laws of nature. Leibniz wrote:

...the entelechy of Aristotle, which has made so much noise, is nothing else but force or activity; that is, a state from which action naturally flows if nothing hinders it. But matter, primary and pure, taken without the souls or lives which are united to it, is purely passive; properly speaking also it is not a substance, but something incomplete.

Leibniz's study of the "entelechy" now known as energy was part of what he called his new science of "dynamics", based on the Greek word dunamis and his understanding that he was making a modern version of Aristotle's old dichotomy. He also referred to it as the "new science of power and action", (Latin potentia et effectu and potentia et actione). And it is from him that the modern distinction between statics and dynamics in physics stems. The emphasis on dunamis in the name of this new science comes from the importance of his discovery of potential energy which is not active, but conserves energy nevertheless. "As 'a science of power and action', dynamics arises when Leibniz proposes an adequate architectonic of laws for constrained, as well as unconstrained, motions." For Leibniz, like Aristotle, this law of nature concerning entelechies was also understood as a metaphysical law, important not only for physics, but also for understanding life and the soul. A soul, or spirit, according to Leibniz, can be understood as a type of entelechy (or living monad) which has distinct perceptions and memory.

=== Influence on modern physics ===
Ideas about potentiality have been related to quantum mechanics, where a wave function in a superposition of potential values (before measurement) has the potential to collapse into one of those values, under the Copenhagen interpretation of quantum mechanics. In particular, the German physicist Werner Heisenberg called this "a quantitative version of the old concept of 'potentia' in Aristotelian philosophy".

=== Entelecheia in modern philosophy and biology ===
Terms derived from dunamis and energeia have become parts of modern scientific vocabulary with a very different meaning from Aristotle's. The original meanings are not used by modern philosophers unless they are commenting on classical or medieval philosophy. In contrast, entelecheia, in the form of entelechy is a word used much less in technical senses. The concept had occupied a central position in the metaphysics of Leibniz, and is closely related to his monad in the sense that each sentient entity contains its own entire universe within it. Leibniz' use of this concept influenced more than just the development of the vocabulary of modern physics. Leibniz was also one of the main inspirations for the important movement in philosophy known as German idealism, and within this movement and schools influenced by it entelechy may denote a force propelling one to self-fulfillment. In the biological vitalism of Hans Driesch, living things develop by entelechy, a common purposive and organising field. Leading vitalists like Driesch argued that many of the basic problems of biology cannot be solved by a philosophy in which the organism is simply considered a machine. Vitalism and its concepts like entelechy have since been discarded as without value for scientific practice by the overwhelming majority of professional biologists.

Important to the philosophy of Giorgio Agamben is potentiality and the notion that tied in every potentiality is the potentiality to not do something as well, and that actuality is actually the not not doing of a potentiality; Agamben notes that thought is unique in that it is the ability to reflect on this potentiality in itself rather than in a relation to an object making the mind a sort of tabula rasa; however, in philosophy aspects and applications of the concept of entelechy have been explored by scientifically interested philosophers and philosophically inclined scientists alike. One example was the American critic and philosopher Kenneth Burke (1897–1993) whose concept of the "terministic screen" illustrates his thought on the subject. Denis Noble argues that, just as teleological causation is necessary to the social sciences, specific teleological causation in biology, expressing functional purpose, should be restored and that it is already implicit in neo-Darwinism (e.g. "selfish gene"). Teleological analysis proves parsimonious when the level of analysis is appropriate to the complexity of the required 'level' of explanation (e.g. whole body or organ rather than cell mechanism).

== See also ==
- Actual infinity
- Actus purus
- Alexander of Aphrodisias
- Essence–Energies distinction
- First cause
- Henosis
- Hylomorphism
- Hypokeimenon
- Hypostasis (philosophy and religion)
- Sumbebekos
- Theosis
- Unmoved movers

== Bibliography ==
- Aristotle (1999), Aristotle's Metaphysics, a new translation by Joe Sachs, Santa Fe, NM: Green Lion Books, ISBN 1-888009-03-9
- Beere, Jonathan (1990), Doing and Being: An Interpretation of Aristotle's Metaphysics Theta, Oxford
- Bradshaw, David (2004). Aristotle East and West: Metaphysics and the Division of Christendom. Cambridge University Press. ISBN 978-0-521-82865-9.
- Charles, David (1984), Aristotle's Philosophy of Action, Duckworth
- Coope, Ursula (2009), "Change and its Relation to Actuality and Potentiality", in Anagnostopoulos, Georgios (ed.), A Companion to Aristotle, Blackwell, p. 277, ISBN 978-1-4443-0567-8
- Davidson, Herbert (1992), Alfarabi, Avicenna, and Averroes, on Intellect, Oxford University Press
- Duchesneau, François (1998), "Leibniz's Theoretical Shift in the Phoranomus and Dynamica de Potentia", Perspectives on Science, 6 (1&2): 77–109, doi:10.1162/posc_a_00545, S2CID 141935224
- Durrant, Michael (1993). Aristotle's De Anima in Focus. Taylor & Francis. ISBN 978-0-415-05340-2.
- Jaeger, Gregg (2017), "Quantum potentiality revisited", Philosophical Transactions of the Royal Society A, 375 (2106) 20160390, Bibcode:2017RSPTA.37560390J, doi:10.1098/rsta.2016.0390, PMID 28971942
- Klein, Jacob (1985), "Leibnitz, an Introduction", Lectures and Essays, St Johns College Press
- Kosman, Aryeh (1969), "Aristotle's Definition of Motion", Phronesis, 14 (1): 40–62, doi:10.1163/156852869x00037
- Kosman, Aryeh (2013), The Activity of Being: an Essay on Aristotle's Ontology, Harvard University Press
- Heinaman, Robert (1994), "Is Aristotle's definition of motion circular?", Apeiron (27), doi:10.1515/APEIRON.1994.27.1.25, S2CID 171013812
- Leibniz, Gottfried (1890) [1715], "On the Doctrine of Malebranche. A Letter to M. Remond de Montmort, containing Remarks on the Book of Father Tertre against Father Malebranche", The Philosophical Works of Leibnitz, p. 234
- Locke, John (1689). "Book II Chapter XXI "Of Power"". An Essay concerning Human Understanding and Other Writings, Part 2. The Works of John Locke in Nine Volumes. Vol. 2. Rivington.
- Mayr, Ernst (2002). The Walter Arndt Lecture: The Autonomy of Biology.
- Sachs, Joe (1995), Aristotle's Physics: a Guided Study, Rutgers University Press
- Sachs, Joe (1999), Aristotle's Metaphysics, a New Translation by Joe Sachs, Santa Fe, NM: Green Lion Books, ISBN 1-888009-03-9
- Sachs, Joe (2001), Aristotle's On the Soul and On Memory and Recollection, Green Lion Books
- Sachs, Joe (2005), "Aristotle: Motion and its Place in Nature", Internet Encyclopedia of Philosophy
- Warnock, Mary (1950). "A Note on Aristotle: Categories 6a 15". Mind. New Series (59): 552–554. doi:10.1093/mind/LIX.236.552.

=== Old translations of Aristotle ===
- Aristotle (2009). "The Internet Classics Archive - Aristotle On the Soul, J.A. Smith translator". MIT.
- Aristotle (2009). "The Internet Classics Archive - Aristotle Categories, E.M. Edghill translator". MIT.
- Aristotle (2009). "The Internet Classics Archive - Aristotle Physics, R.P. Hardie & Gaye, R.K. translators". MIT.
- Aristotle (1908). Metaphysica translated by W.D. Ross. The Works of Aristotle. Vol. VIII. Oxford: Clarendon Press.
- Aristotle (1989). "Metaphysics, Hugh Tredennick trans.". Aristotle in 23 Volumes. Vol. 17, 18. Cambridge: Harvard University Press; (London: William Heinemann Ltd.). This 1933 translation is reproduced online at the Perseus Project.
