= Miksang =

Form of contemplative photography

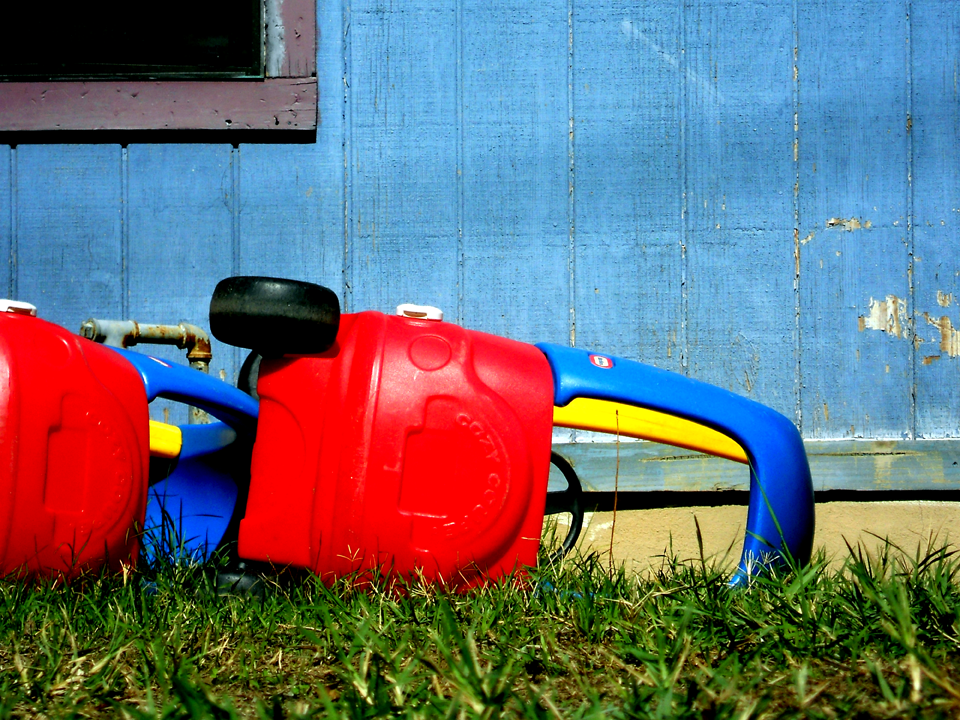
Miksang Color

Miksang is a Tibetan word, meaning "good eye". It represents a form of contemplative photography based on the Dharma Art teachings of Chögyam Trungpa, in which the eye is synchronized with the introspective mind. The result of this particular perception of the world, combined with photography, produces a peculiar and open way of seeing the world. Miksang pictures tend to bring the observer back into the original contemplation state of the author of the picture. The pictures can bring one back to a purer perception of reality that is often neglected. At its core, miksang requires no special setup; instead, only a skilled visual capture, in the proper state of mind of everyday reality.
