= Monad (philosophy) =

Philosophical concept of a most basic substance, or supreme being

The circled dot was used by the Pythagoreans and later Greeks to represent the first metaphysical being, the Monad or the Absolute.

The term monad (from Ancient Greek μονάς (monas) 'unity' and μόνος (monos) 'alone') is used in some cosmic philosophy and cosmogony to refer to a most basic or original substance. As originally conceived by the Pythagoreans, the Monad is, therefore, the Supreme Being, divinity, or the totality of all things.

According to some philosophers of the early modern period, most notably Gottfried Wilhelm Leibniz, there are infinite monads, which are the basic and immense forces, elementary particles, or simplest units that make up the universe.

== Historical background ==
=== Ancient Greece ===
According to Hippolytus of Rome, the Pythagoreans called the first thing that came into existence the "monad", which begat (bore) the dyad (from the Greek word for two), which begat the numbers, which begat the point, begetting lines (or finiteness), and so on. Diogenes Laërtius similarly held that from the monad evolved the dyad; from it numbers; from numbers, points; then lines, two-dimensional entities, three-dimensional entities, bodies, culminating in the four classical elements of earth, water, fire and air, from which the rest of our world is built up. (Note: This Pythagorean cosmogony is in some sense similar to a brief passage found in the Daoist Laozi: "From the Dao comes one, from one comes two, from two comes three, and from three comes the ten thousand things".)

For the Pythagoreans, the generation of number series bridged the gap between objects of geometry and cosmogony (creation theories). They thus held the monad as a symbol of divinity, the first being, or the totality of all beings, referring in cosmogony variously to source acting alone or an indivisible origin and equivalent comparators.

In the Neoplatonic metaphysics of Proclus, reality is organized in a fractal-like structure, where the role of the monad is to bind together each layer with the next, such that a monad at a higher level folds out into a multiplicity at a lower level; this lower multiplicity is itself a multiplicity of monads at the next level down. Proclus thus writes in the Elements of Theology (21.1–3): "Every order of reality has its beginning in a monad and proceeds to a multiplicity coordinate with that monad; and the multiplicity in any order may be referred back to a single monad."

Some Neoplatonic philosophers, such as Plotinus and Porphyry, were opposed to Gnosticism, which they considered broadly synonymous with Christianity as a whole. In Against the Gnostics (Enn. II.9), Plotinus contends that they "contract the divine into one", thereby accusing them of misapplying Platonic theory about the monad in defense of monotheism.

The idea of the monad is also reflected in the demiurge, or the belief of one supreme being that brought about the creation of the universe.

=== Medieval Christianity ===
In his Latin-language treaty Maximae theologiae, Alain de Lille affirms that "God is an intelligible sphere, whose center is everywhere and whose circumference is nowhere." The French philosopher François Rabelais ascribed this proposition to Hermes Trismegistus. This Euclidean symbolism of the centered sphere also concerns the secular debate on the existence of a center of the universe. The symbolism is a free exegesis related to the Trinity in Christian theology and influenced by Plotinus. Alain also mentions the Book of the Twenty-Four Philosophers, attributed to Hermes Trismegistus, wherein it is stated that a Monad will beget only another Monad; some Christians saw in this the generation of God the Son from God the Father. This view might be similar to that of the pagan author of the Asclepius, who sometimes has also been identified with Hermes Trismegistus. The Book of the Twenty-Four Philosophers completes the scheme adding that the ardor of the second Monad to the first Monad would be the Holy Spirit. It closes a physical circle in a logical triangle (with a retroaction).

== Modern philosophy ==
The term monad was adopted from Greek philosophy by a number of modern philosophers, including Giordano Bruno, Anne Conway, John Dee (The Hieroglyphic Monad), and Gottfried Wilhelm Leibniz (Monadology). The concept of the monad as a universal substance is also used by Theosophists as a synonym for the Sanskrit term "svabhavat"; the Mahatma Letters make frequent use of the term.

== See also ==
- Atomism
- Dyad, Triad, and Tetrad
- Ensō
- Henology
- Iamblichus Chalcidensis
- Ik Onkar
- Leucippus
- Monad (Gnosticism)
- Monism
- Om
- Taijitu
- Sufi metaphysics#Waḥdat al-Wujūd (unity of existence)

== Bibliography ==
- Butler, Edward P. (2016). "Plotinian Henadology" (PDF). Kronos – metafizyka, kultura, religia. 5: 143–159.
- Chlup, Radek (2012). Proclus: an introduction. Cambridge University Press. doi:10.1017/CBO9781139028042. ISBN 978-1-316-62885-0.
- Hemenway, Priya. Divine Proportion: Phi In Art, Nature, and Science. Sterling Publishing Company Inc., 2005, p. 56. ISBN 1-4027-3522-7
- Sandywell, Barry. Presocratic Reflexivity: The Construction of Philosophical Discourse C. 600-450 BC. Routledge, 1996.
