= Dyad (philosophy) =

Concept in Pythagorean philosophy

The Dyad is a title used by the Pythagoreans for the number two, representing the principle of "twoness" or "otherness".

Numenius of Apamea, a Neopythagorean philosopher in the latter 2nd century CE, said that Pythagoras gave the name of Monad to God, and the name of Dyad to matter. Aristotle equated matter as the formation of the elements (energies) into the material world as the static material was formed by the energies being acted upon by force or motion. Later Neoplatonic Philosophers and idealists like Plotinus treated the dyad as a second cause (demiurge), which was the divine mind (nous) that via a reflective nature (finiteness) causes matter to "appear" or become perceivable.

== See also ==
- Monad
- Tetrad
