= Contemporary Islamic philosophy =

Contemporary Islamic philosophy revives some of the trends of medieval Islamic philosophy, notably the tension between Mutazilite and Asharite views of ethics in science and law, and the duty of Muslims and role of Islam in the sociology of knowledge and in forming ethical codes and legal codes, especially the fiqh (or "jurisprudence") and rules of jihad (or "just war").

== Key figures of modern Islamic philosophy ==
Key figures from different regions, representing important trends include:

=== South Asia ===
- Muhammad Iqbal sought an Islamic revival based on social justice ideals and emphasized traditional rules, e.g. against usury. He argued strongly that dogma, territorial nationalism and outright racism, all of which were profoundly rejected in early Islam and especially by Muhammad himself, were splitting Muslims into warring factions, encouraging materialism and nihilism. His thought was influential in the emergence of a movement for independence of Pakistan, where he was revered as the national poet. Indirectly this strain of Islam also influenced Malcolm X and other figures who sought a global ethic through the Five Pillars of Islam. Iqbal can be credited with at least trying to reconstruct Islamic thought from the base, though some of his philosophical and scientific ideas would appear dated to us now. His basic ideas concentrated on free-will, which would allow Muslims to become active agents in their history. His interest in Nietzsche (who he called 'the Wise Man of Europe') has led later Muslim scholars to criticise him for advocating dangerous ideals that, according to them, have eventually formed certain strains of pan-Islamism. Some claim that the Four Pillars of the Green Party honor Iqbal and Islamic traditions.
- Fazlur Rahman was professor of Islamic thought at the University of Chicago and McGill University, and an expert in Islamic philosophy. Not as widely known as his scholar-activist contemporary Ismail al-Faruqi, he is nonetheless considered an important figure for Islam in the 20th century. He argued that the basis of Islamic revival was the return to the intellectual dynamism that was the hallmark of the Islamic scholarly tradition (these ideas are outlined in Revival and Reform in Islam: A Study of Islamic Fundamentalism and his magnum opus, Islam). He sought to give philosophy free rein, and was keen on Muslims appreciating how the modern nation-state understood law, as opposed to ethics; his view being that the shari'ah was a mixture of both ethics and law. He was critical of historical Muslim theologies and philosophies for failing to create a moral and ethical worldview based on the values derived from the Qur'an: 'moral values', unlike socioeconomic values, 'are not exhausted at any point in history' but require constant interpretation. Rahman was driven to exile from his homeland, Pakistan, where he was part of a committee which sought to interpret Islam for the fledgling modern sovereign state. Some of his ideas from English (which he claimed were from the Islamic tradition) were reprinted in Urdu and caused outrage among conservative Muslim scholars in Pakistan. These were quickly exploited by opponents of his political paymaster, General Ayyub Khan, and led to his eventual exile in the United States.
- Muhammad Hamidullah belonged to a family of scholars, jurists, writers and sufis. He was a world-renowned scholar of Islam and international law from India, who was known for contributions to the research of the history of Hadith, translations of the Qur'an, the advancement of Islamic learning, and to the dissemination of Islamic teachings in the Western world.
- Syed Zafarul Hasan was a prominent twentieth-century Muslim philosopher. From 1924 to 1945 he was professor of philosophy at the Muslim University, Aligarh – where he also served as chairman of the Department of Philosophy and dean of the Faculty of Arts. There, in 1939, he put forward the 'Aligarh Scheme'. From 1945 until the partition of the sub-continent, Dr Hasan was emeritus professor at Aligarh. Dr. Zafarul Hasan was born on 14 February 1885. He died on 19 June 1949.
- M. A. Muqtedar Khan is a professor of Islam and International Relations at the University of Delaware. He is a prominent Muslim intellectual and philosopher and commentator on Islamic Thought and Global Politics. He organized the first contemporary Islamic Philosophers conference at Georgetown University in 1998. His work is on the subject of the philosophy of identity and rationality, Ijtihad, Islam and democracy and Islamic reform.
- Akbar S. Ahmed is an anthropologist, filmmaker and an outstanding scholar on Islam, international relations/politics and contemporary Islamic philosophy from Pakistan. He is Ibn Khaldun chairman of Islamic Studies at the American University in Washington DC and was the High Commissioner of Pakistan to UK. He has advised Prince Charles and met with President George W. Bush on Islam. His numerous books, films and documentaries have won awards. His books have been translated into many languages including Chinese and Indonesian. Ahmed is "the world's leading authority on contemporary Islam" according to the BBC.
- Javed Ahmad Ghamidi is a well-known Pakistani Islamic scholar, exegete, and educator. A former member of the Jamaat-e-Islami, he has extended the work of his tutor, Amin Ahsan Islahi. He is frequently labeled a modernist for his insistence on the historical contextualization of Muhammad's revelation in order to grasp its true moral import.
- Feisal Abdul Rauf is a well-known proponent of cultural reconciliation between the Muslim World and the West, basing his views on Classical Islamic governance's similarity to Western governance models in terms of religious freedoms and democratic inclination. Abdul Rauf is a highly visible American-Egyptian Imam at New York's Masjid al-Farah in addition to being Founder and Chairman of Cordoba Initiative, a non-profit organization seeking to bridge the divide between the Muslim world and the West.
- Syed Muhammad Naquib al-Attas is a Malaysian philosopher.
- Syed Abul A'la Maududi He was a Pakistani philosopher.
- Wahiduddin Khan was an Indian Islamic scholar and philosopher. He founded Centre for Peace and Spirituality (CPS). He wrote over 200 books on several aspects of Islam and established the Centre for Peace and Spirituality to promote interfaith dialogue. He openly spoke on Islam and politics, peace and interfaith relationships, political status quo-ism, existence of God, and Tazkia & Sufism. He has over 200 books on his name on several topics including, islamic philosophy, politics, Quran and coexistence in multi-ethnic societies.

=== Europe ===
- Shabbir Akhtar is a British Muslim philosopher, poet, researcher, writer and multilingual scholar. He is currently in the Faculty of Theology and Religions at University of Oxford. This Cambridge-trained thinker is trying to revive the tradition of Sunni Islamic philosophy, defunct since Ibn Khaldun, against the background of western analytical philosophical method. His major treatise is The Quran and the Secular Mind (2007). Akhtar argues that, unlike Christianity, Islam as a juridical monotheism, has no interest in theology, the speculative inquiry into God's nature and essence. Muslims need to know only the moral and legal will of God. Moreover, Akhtar claims that the exegesis of the scripture should be classified as part of the analytical philosophy of Islam.

=== Shia World ===
- Morteza Motahhari was a lecturer at Tehran University. Motahhari is considered important for developing the ideologies of the Islamic Republic. He wrote on exegesis of the Qur'an, philosophy, ethics, sociology, history and many other subjects. In all his writings the real object he had in view was to give replies to the objections raised by others against Islam, to prove the shortcomings of other schools of thought and to manifest the greatness of Islam. He believed that in order to prove the falsity of Marxism and other ideologies like it, it was necessary not only to comment on them in a scholarly manner but also to present the real image of Islam.
- Ali Shariati was a sociologist and a professor of Mashhad University. He was one of the most influential figures in the Islamic world in the 20th century. He attempted to explain and provide solutions for the problems faced by Muslim societies through traditional Islamic principles interwoven with and understood from the point of view of modern sociology and philosophy. Shariati was also deeply influenced by Mowlana and Muhammad Iqbal.
- Musa al-Sadr was a prominent Shi'a Muslim intellectual and one of the most influential Muslim philosophers of 20th century. He is most famous for his political role, but he was also a philosopher who had been trained by Allameh Tabatabaei. As Professor Seyyed Hossein Nasr said: "his great political influence and fame was enough for people to not consider his philosophical attitude, although he was a well-trained follower of long living intellectual tradition of Islamic Philosophy". One of his famous writings is a long introduction for the Arabic translation of Henry Corbin's History of Islamic Philosophy.
- Seyyed Hossein Nasr is a major perennialist thinker. His works defend Islamic and perennialist doctrines and principles while challenging the theoretical underpinnings of modern science. He argues that knowledge has been desacralized in the modern period, that is, separated from its divine source—God—and calls for its resacralization through sacred traditions and sacred science. His environmental philosophy is expressed in terms of Islamic environmentalism and the resacralization of nature.
- Muhammad Baqir al-Sadr was an Iraqi Shi'a cleric, a philosopher, and ideological founder of Islamic Dawa Party born in al-Kazimiya, Iraq. Mohammad Baqir Al-Sadr's political philosophy, known as Wilayat Al-Umma (Governance of the people), set out his view of a modern-day Islamic state. His most famous philosophical works include: Falsafatuna (Our Philosophy), in which he refutes modern Western philosophical schools and asserts an Islamic view, Iqtisaduna (Our Economy), consisting of an exegesis of Islamic economics coupled with a critique of Western political economy as manifested in the Soviet Union on one hand and the United States on the other, and Al-Usus al-Mantiqiyyah lil-Istiqra' (The Logical Basis of Induction) in which he develops a theory which allows one to reach certainty through inductive methods.

=== Arab world ===
- Ismail al-Faruqi looked more closely at the ethics and sociology of knowledge, concluding that no scientific method or philosophy could exist that was wholly ignorant of a theory of conduct or the consequences a given path of inquiry and technology. His "Islamization of knowledge" program sought to converge early Muslim philosophy with modern sciences, resulting in, for example, Islamic economics and Islamic sociology.
- Nader El-Bizri a British–Lebanese philosopher, historian of science, and architectural theorist. He is a professor of philosophy and the chair of the Civilization Studies Program at the American University of Beirut. He previously taught at the University of Cambridge, the University of Nottingham, the University of Lincoln, and Harvard University. He is affiliated with the French CNRS in Paris, and with the Institute of Ismaili Studies in London. He published and lectured widely on Ibn al-Haytham, Ibn Sina, Ikhwan al-Safa', and also on Heidegger and on phenomenology as well as architectural theory. He served on various editorial boards with academic publishers like Oxford University Press, Cambridge University Press, Springer, Brill, I.B. Tauris. He acted as consultant to the Aga Khan Trust for Culture in Geneva, the Science Museum in London, and the Guggenheim Museum in New York. He contributed also to various BBC radio and TV programs on Islamic philosophy and the history of the exact sciences in Islam. He is also a recipient of the prestigious Kuwait Foundation for the Advancement of Sciences Prize in 2014, and he recently joined the Oxford and Durham research team on medieval science in Britain. Nader El-Bizri's approach to Islamic philosophy is historical and at the same time informed at the interpretive levels by readings from contemporary Continental Thought and Anglo-American Analytic Philosophy, with a special emphasis on ontology and epistemology. El-Bizri's philosophical writings aim at renewing the impetus of philosophy in the contemporary Islamicate milieu. He is partly impacted in this by Heidegger and the reception of Heideggerian thought in the Islamicate world.
- Abu Abd al-Rahman Ibn Aqil al-Zahiri is a retired Saudi Arabian polymath and member of the Academy of the Arabic Language in Cairo. His work has primarily dealt with the reconciliation of reason and revelation, especially in regard to issues surrounding the existence of God and theodicy. He has published bibliographies, anthologies and journal articles and lectured at conferences regarding logic in Islamic philosophy, showing especially strong interest in the work of Ibn Hazm and Ibn Rushd. Various academic endeavors on his part have received UNESCO support in the past.
- Taha Abdurrahman is a Moroccan philosopher known for his formulation of an Islamic form of modernity.
- Hassan Hanafi, leading modern Islamic thinker, a philosopher and chair of the philosophy department at the University of Cairo.
- Muhammad Asad was an Islamic thinker, notable for his English translation and commentary on the Qur'an. Asad also contributed to post-colonial Islamic political theory, influencing the First Constitution of Pakistan. He also lived in Saudi Arabia as an advisor to Ibn Saud, and influenced state formation there.
- Talal Asad, son of Muhammad Asad, is an anthropologist and political theorist whose work is primarily concerned with postcolonialism and poststructuralism. He is specifically concerned with "secularism" and "secularity" as epistemological categories, and how they relate to the epistemological category of "religion," and to identity formation more broadly.
