= Islamic revival =

Movements to revive the faith in Islamic history

Islamic revival (Arabic: تجديد tajdīd, lit., 'regeneration, renewal'; also الصحوة الإسلامية aṣ-Ṣaḥwah l-ʾIslāmiyyah, 'Islamic awakening') refers to a revival of Islam, usually centered around enforcing Sharia.

Within the Islamic tradition, tajdid is an important religious concept called for periodically throughout Islamic history and according to a sahih hadith occurring every century. They manifest in renewed commitment to the fundamentals of Islam, the holy Quran and Sunnah, the divine law of Sharia, and reconstruction of society in accordance with them.

In academic literature, "Islamic revival" is an umbrella term for revivalist movements in Islam, spanning a number of different or opposing meanings: Movements which may be "intolerant and exclusivist", or "pluralistic"; "favorable to science", or against it; "primarily devotional", or "primarily political"; democratic, or authoritarian; pacific, or violent.

The Islamic revival of the late 20th century, brought "re-Islamization", ranging from an increase in the number of Sharia-based legal statutes, attendees at Hajj, women wearing hijab, fundamentalist preachers and their influence, and terrorist attacks by radical Islamist groups. A feeling of a "growing universalistic Islamic identity" or transnational Islam among immigrants in non-Muslim countries (Note: described by the French Islam researchers Gilles Kepel and Olivier Roy) was also evident.

Explanations for the revival include the perceived failure of secularism, in the form of Westernized ruling elites that were increasingly seen as authoritarian, ineffective and lacking cultural authenticity; the secular Arab nationalists whose governments were humiliatingly defeated in the Six-Day War with Israel; the fall of previously prosperous multi-confessional Lebanon into a destructive sectarian civil war; perceived successes of Islam included the surprising victory of Islamist forces against a well-armed and financed secular monarch in the 1979 Iranian Revolution; and hundreds of billions of dollars spent by Saudi Arabia and other gulf states around the Muslim world to encourage the following of stricter, more conservative strains of Islam.

During the Cold War following World War II, the United States and the United Kingdom launched covert and overt campaigns to encourage and strengthen Islamic fundamentalist groups in the Middle East, North Africa, and southern Asia. These groups were seen as a hedge against potential expansion by the Soviet Union, and as a counterweight against nationalist and socialist movements that were seen as a threat to the interests of the Western nations.

According to some estimates, between 1960s and 2016, Saudi Arabia funnelled over US$100 billion to spread Wahhabi Islam. According to political scientist Alex Alexiev, the impetus for the international propagation of Salafism and Wahhabism by Saudi Arabia was "the largest worldwide propaganda campaign ever mounted". Similarly, David A. Kaplan described it as "dwarfing the Soviets' propaganda efforts at the height of the Cold War". In a 2018 interview with The Washington Post, Mohammed bin Salman, the de facto ruler of Saudi Arabia, said that International propagation of the Salafi movement and Wahhabism campaign was "rooted in the Cold War, when allies asked Saudi Arabia to use its resources to prevent inroads in Muslim countries by the Soviet Union." In 2013, the European Parliament identified Wahhabism as the main source of global terrorism.

Preachers and scholars who have been described as revivalists (mujaddids) or mujaddideen, by differing sects and groups in the history of Islam include Ahmad ibn Hanbal, Ibn Taymiyyah, Shah Waliullah Dehlawi, Ahmad Sirhindi, Ashraf Ali Thanwi, Muhammad ibn Abd al-Wahhab, and Muhammad Ahmad. In the 20th century, figures such as Sayyid Rashid Rida, Hassan al-Banna, Sayyid Qutb, Abul A'la Maududi, Ruhollah Khomeini and Syed Mahbub E Khoda have been described as such. Academics often use the terms "Islamist" and "Islamic revivalist" interchangeably. Contemporary revivalist currents include jihadism; neo-Sufism, which cultivates Muslim spirituality; and classical fundamentalism, which stresses obedience to Sharia and ritual observance.

Some of the more prominent examples include Saudi Arabia after the 1979 Grand Mosque attack, Iran after the 1979 revolution, Pakistan after Zia's Islamization in 1979, and Afghanistan after the rise of the Mujahideen from the Soviet–Afghan War in 1979. In Islam, a revival leader is known as a mujaddid.

== Early history of revivalism ==
The concept of Islamic revival is based on a sahih hadith (a saying attributed to Muhammad), recorded by Abu Dawood, narrated by Abu Hurairah, who reported that Muhammad said:

Allah will raise for this community at the end of every 100 years the one who will renovate its religion for it.

— Sunan Abu Dawood, Book 37: Kitab al-Malahim [Battles], Hadith Number 4278

Within the Islamic tradition, tajdid (lit., regeneration, renewal) has been an important religious concept. Early in the history of Islam, Muslims believed they had not succeeded in creating and maintaining a society that truly followed the principles of their religion. As a result, Islamic history has seen periodic calls for a renewed commitment to the fundamental principles of Islam and it has also seen periodic calls for the reconstruction of society in accordance with the Quran and the traditions of Muhammad (hadith). These efforts frequently drew inspiration from the hadith in which Muhammad states: "God will send to His community at the head of each century those who will renew its faith for it". Throughout Islamic history, Muslims looked to reforming religious leaders to fulfil the role of a mujaddid (lit., renovator). Although there is disagreement over which individuals might actually be identified as such, Muslims agree that mujaddids have been an important force in the history of Islamic societies.

The modern movement of Islamic revival has been compared with earlier efforts of a similar nature: The "oscillat[ion] between periods of strict religious observance and others of devotional laxity" in Islamic history was striking enough for "the Muslim historian, Ibn Khaldun to ponder its causes 600 years ago, and speculate that it could be "attributed ... to features of ecology and social organization peculiar to the Middle East", namely the tension between the easy living in the towns and the austere life in the desert.

Some of the more famous revivalists and revival movements include the Almoravid and Almohad dynasties in Maghreb and Spain (1042–1269), Indian Naqshbandi revivalist Ahmad Sirhindi (~1564–1624), the Kadizadeli in the Ottoman Empire that followed Kadızade Mehmed (1582–1635), a revivalist Islamic preacher, the Indian Ahl-i Hadith movement of the 19th century, preachers Ibn Taymiyyah (1263–1328), Shah Waliullah Dehlawi (1702–1762), and Muhammad ibn Abd al-Wahhab (d. 1792).

In the late 19th century, Jamal al-Din al-Afghani, "one of the most influential Muslim reformers" of the era, traveled the Muslim world, advocating for Islamic modernism and pan-Islamism. His sometime acolyte Muhammad Abduh has been called "the most influential figure" of Modernist Salafism.

Muhammad Rashid Rida, his protege Hassan al-Banna would establish the Ikhwan al-Muslimeen, The Society of the Muslim Brothers, better known as the Muslim Brotherhood, in 1928, the first mass Islamist organization. Despite him being influenced by Rida and his drawing of ideas primarily from Islamic sources, Al-Banna nevertheless was willing to engage with modern European concepts like nationalism, constitutionalism, etc.

In South Asia, Islamic revivalist intellectuals and statesmen like Syed Ahmad Khan, Muhammad Iqbal, Muhammad Ali Jinnah promoted the Two-Nation Theory and the Muslim League established the world's first modern Islamic republic, Pakistan. Abul Ala Maududi was the later leader of this movement who established Jamaat-e-Islami in South Asia. Today it is one of the most influential Islamic parties in the Indian sub-continent, spanning three countries (Pakistan, India, and Bangladesh), although the different national parties have no organisational link between them. Muhammed Ilyas Kandhlawi was an Indian Islamic scholar who founded the widely influential Tablighi Jamaat Islamic revivalist movement, in 1925. It is now a worldwide movement with over 50 million active followers, it is a non-political movement which focuses on increasing the Muslims' faith and for them to return to the sunnah way of life.

Whether or not the contemporary revival is part of an historical cycle, the uniqueness of the close association of the Muslim community with its religion has been noted by scholar Michael Cook who observed that "of all the major cultural domains" the Muslim world "seems to have been the least penetrated by irreligion". In the last few decades ending in 2000, rather than scientific knowledge and secularism edging aside religion, Islamic fundamentalism has "increasingly represented the cutting edge" of Muslim culture.

== Contemporary revivalism ==
After the late 1970s, when the Iranian Revolution erupted, a worldwide Islamic revival emerged in response to the success of the revolution, owing in large part to the failure of secular Arab nationalist movement in the aftermath of the Six-Day War and popular disappointment with secular nation states in the Middle East and Westernized ruling elites, which had dominated the Muslim world during the preceding decades, and which were increasingly seen as authoritarian, ineffective and lacking cultural authenticity. Further motivation for the revival included the Lebanese Civil War, which began in 1975 and resulted in a level of sectarianism between Muslims and Christians previously unseen in many Middle Eastern countries. Another motivation was the newfound wealth and discovered political leverage brought to much of the Muslim world in the aftermath of the 1973 oil crisis and also the Grand Mosque seizure which occurred in late 1979 amidst the revival; both of these events encouraged the rise of the phenomenon of "Petro-Islam" and the International propagation of conservative revivalist strains of Islam favored by Saudi Arabia and other petroleum exporting Gulf states during the mid-to-late 1970s. In an effort by the Saudi monarchy to counterbalance the consolidation of the Iranian Revolution, it exported neo-Wahhabi ideologies to many mosques worldwide. As such, it has been argued that with both of the Islamic superpowers in the Middle East (Iran and Saudi Arabia) espousing Islamist ideologies by the end of the 1970s, and the isolation of the traditionally secularist Egypt during the period from being the most influential Arab country as a result of the Camp David Accords- resulting in Saudi Arabia's newfound dominance over Arab countries – the Islamic revival became especially potent amongst Muslims worldwide. With Lebanon, traditionally a source of secular Arab culture, fractured between Muslim and Christian, exposing the failures of its secular confessionalist political system, there was a general idea amongst many Muslims by the late 1970s that secularism had failed in the Middle East to deliver the demands of the masses. In Egypt, the revival was also motivated by the migration of many Egyptians during the 1980s to the Gulf countries in search of work; when they returned, returning especially in the aftermath of the Gulf War in Kuwait, they brought the neo-Wahhabist ideologies and more conservative customs of the Gulf back with them.

=== Manifestations ===
The term "Islamic revival" encompasses "a wide variety of movements, some intolerant and exclusivist, some pluralistic; some favorable to science, some anti-scientific; some primarily devotional, and some primarily political; some democratic, some authoritarian; some pacific, some violent".

The revival has been manifested in greater piety and a growing adoption of Islamic culture among ordinary Muslims. In the 1980s there were more veiled women in the streets. One striking example of it is the increase in attendance at the Hajj, the annual pilgrimage to Mecca, which grew from 90,000 in 1926 to 2 million in 1979.

Among revivalist currents, neo-fundamentalism predominates, stressing obedience to Islamic law and ritual observance. There have also been Islamic liberal revivalists attempting to reconcile Islamic beliefs with contemporary values and neo-Sufism cultivates Muslim spirituality; Many revivalist movements have a community-building orientation, focusing on collective worship, education, charity or simple sociability. Many local movements are linked up with national or transnational organizations which sponsor charitable, educational and missionary activities.

A number of revivalist movements have called for implementation of sharia. The practical implications of this call are often obscure, since historically Islamic law has varied according to time and place, but as an ideological slogan it serves "to rally support for the creation of a utopian, divinely governed Islamic state and society".

According to scholar Olivier Roy,

The call to fundamentalism, centered on the sharia: this call is as old as Islam itself and yet still new because it has never been fulfilled, It is a tendency that is forever setting the reformer, the censor, and tribunal against the corruption of the times and of sovereigns, against foreign influence, political opportunism, moral laxity, and the forgetting of sacred texts.

Contemporary Islamic revival includes a feeling of a "growing universalistic Islamic identity" as often shared by Muslim immigrants and their children who live in non-Muslim countries. According to Ira Lapidus,

The increased integration of world societies as a result of enhanced communications, media, travel, and migration makes meaningful the concept of a single Islam practiced everywhere in similar ways, and an Islam which transcends national and ethnic customs.

But not necessarily transnational political or social organisations:

Global Muslim identity does not necessarily or even usually imply organised group action. Even though Muslims recognise a global affiliation, the real heart of Muslim religious life remains outside politics – in local associations for worship, discussion, mutual aid, education, charity, and other communal activities.

=== Causes ===
A global wave of Islamic revivalism emerged starting from the end of 1970s owing in large part to popular disappointment with the secular nation states and Westernized ruling elites, which had dominated the Muslim world during the preceding decades, and which were increasingly seen as authoritarian, ineffective and lacking cultural authenticity. It was also a reaction against Western influences such as individualism, consumerism, commodification of women, and sexual liberty, which were seen as subverting Islamic values and identities. Among the political factors was also the ideological vacuum that emerged after the decline of socialist system and related weakening of the liberal (Western) ideology.

Economic and demographic factors, such as lagging economic development, a rise in income inequality and a decline in social mobility, the rise of an educated youth with expectation of higher upward mobility, and urbanization in the Muslim world also played a major part. In general, the gap between higher expectations and reality among many in the Muslim world was an important factor. Gulf oil money was also a huge factor, in a phenomenon known as Petro-Islam.

The above reasons are generally agreed to be the ultimate causes of the Islamic revival. There were also specific political events which heralded the revival. Major historical turning points in the Islamic revival include, in chronological order:

- The Arab defeat in the 1967 Six-Day War helped to convince many Muslims that pan-Arabism failed to deliver on its promises. According to a common assessment offered at the time, "the Jews had deserved victory by being truer to their religion than the Arabs had been to theirs". After a period of introspection and rise of religious discourse, the Yom Kippur War of 1973 was fought in the name of Islam rather than pan-Arabism and the greater success of Arab armies was seen to validate the change.
- The energy crisis of the 1970s, which led to the formation of the Organization of Petroleum Exporting Countries (OPEC) and the quadrupling of global oil prices. At first, this led to an expectation that the oil wealth would lead to a long-awaited resurgence of the Islamic civilization, and when this failed to materialize, the mounting frustration with secular regimes made the public more receptive to religious fundamentalism. Scholar Gilles Kepel, agrees that the tripling in the price of oil in the mid-1970s and the progressive takeover of Saudi Aramco in the 1974–1980 period, provided the source of much influence of Wahhabism in the Islamic World, in the aforementioned phenomenon of Petro-Islam.
- The opening of the first Islamic bank in Dubai.
- The rise of the Mujahideen in Afghanistan in the 1979. The Mujahideen were a major beneficiary of Petro-Islam, and would ultimately lead to the rise of Al-Qaeda.
- Zia-ul-Haq introduces Islamic legal system in Pakistan in 1979.
- The return of Ayatollah Khomeini to Iran in 1979 and his establishment of an Islamic republic.
- The Grand Mosque Seizure of 1979 in Saudi Arabia.
- The establishment of many Islamic banks in Turkey in the mid-1980s and the government recognition of these banks.

=== Scholarship and fiqh ===
Islamic revivalist leaders have been "activists first, and scholars only secondarily", emphasizing practical issues of Islamic law and impatience with theory. According to Daniel W. Brown, two "broad features" define the revivalist approach to Islamic authorities: distrust of Islamic scholarship along with "vehement rejection" of taqlid (accepting a scholar's decision without investigating it); and at the same time a strong commitment to the Quran and Sunnah.

=== Political aspects ===
Politically, Islamic resurgence runs the gamut from Islamist regimes in Iran and Afghanistan. Other regimes, such as countries in the Persian Gulf region, and the secular countries of Iraq, Egypt, Libya, and Pakistan, while not a product of the resurgence, have made some concessions to its growing popularity.

In reaction to Islamist opposition during the 1980s, even avowedly secular Muslim states "endeavoured to promote a brand of conservative Islam and to organise an `official Islam`". Official radio stations and journals opened up to fundamentalist preaching.

In 1971, the constitution of Egypt was made to specify (in article 2) that the sharia was "the main source of legislation". In 1991, the Egyptian Security Court condemned the writer Ala'a Hamid to eight years in prison for blasphemy. By the mid-1990s, the official Islamic journal in Egypt – Al-Liwa al-Islami – had a higher circulation than Al-Ahram. The number of "teaching institutes dependent" on Al-Azhar University in Egypt increased "from 1985 in 1986–7 to 4314 in 1995–6".

In Pakistan, a bill to make sharia the exclusive source of law of the state was introduced after General Zia's coup in 1977, and finally passed in 1993 under Nawaz Sharif's government. The number of registered madrassas rose from 137 in 1947 to 3906 in 1995. The Hudud Ordinances were passed in 1979.

In Sudan, the sharia penal code was proclaimed in 1983. South Yemen (formerly the People's Democratic Republic of Yemen) made polygamy legal with a new Family Code in 1992.

In Algeria, the leftist secularist FLN government made Friday an official holy day in 1976. The family law of 1984 "re-introduced some sharia elements" such as Quranic dissymmetry between men and women, and the official policy of Arabisation led to a de facto Islamisation of education.

In secular Turkey, religious teaching in schools was made compulsory in 1983. Religious graduates of İmam Hatip secondary schools were given right of access to the universities and allowed to apply for civil service positions, introducing it to religious-minded people.

Even the Marxist government of Afghanistan, before it was overthrown, introduced religious programs on television in 1986, and declared Islam to be the state religion in 1987.

In Morocco, at the end of the 1990s, more doctorates were written in religious sciences than in social sciences and literature. In Saudi Arabia, the absolute majority of doctorates were in religious sciences.

In Syria, despite the rule of the Arab nationalist Arab Socialist Ba'ath Party,

For the first time, the regime celebrated the Prophet's birth with greater fanfare than the anniversary of the ruling party. Billboards once heralding 'progressiveness and socialism' were also being replaced with new admonitions: 'Pray for the Prophet, and Do not forget to mention God.' President Bashar Assad had recently approved Syria's first Islamic university, as well as three Islamic banks. And Mohammed Habash, the head of the Islamic Studies Center, had been invited to speak on Islam at Syria's military academy – where praying had been banned 25 years earlier. ... In the 1980s, a distinct minority of women in Damascus wore hejab, or modest Islamic dress. In 2006, a distinct majority in Syria's most modern city had put it on.

— Robin Wright, Dreams and Shadows: the Future of the Middle East

In many Muslim countries, there has been a growth of networks of religious schools. "Graduates holding a degree in religious science are now entering the labour market and tend, of course, to advocate the Islamization of education and law in order to improve their job prospects."

In Iraq, Ayatollah Muhammad Baqir al-Sadr criticized Marxism and presented early ideas of an Islamic alternative to socialism and capitalism. Perhaps his most important work was Iqtisaduna (Our Economics), considered an important work of Islamic economics.

=== Criticism ===
One observation made of Islamization is that increased piety and adoption of Sharia has "in no way changed the rules of the political or economic game", by leading to greater virtue. "Ethnic and tribal segmentation, political maneuvering, personal rivalries" have not diminished, nor has corruption in politics and economics based on speculation.

Islamic revivalism has attracted criticism from a wide range of voices, secularists, liberal Muslims, traditional scholars, feminists, and historians among them. Much of it centers on the push to merge religion with state power, which critics say tends to squeeze out political pluralism, muzzle dissent and leave religious minorities with fewer protections. There's also a subtler argument, that when the state takes on the job of enforcing religious observance it hollows out both personal faith and democratic life.

Historian and reformist scholars have taken issue with something else, the tendency of revivalists movements to hold up early Islamic society as a kind of golden template, while glossing over just how varied Islamic legal, technological and political thought has actually been across centuries and continents. The idea that Islam maps neatly onto a single political system, they argue, simply doesn't hold hold up against the historic record.

Feminist and liberal critics have pointed to the treatment of women and minorities under certain revivalist interpretations, restricted rights, limited freedoms, cultural and artistic life brought to heel. Some movement have also been accused of stocking sectarian divisions and reducing complex political questions to matters of religious identity with predictably polarizing results.

Then there are the more practical failures, Islamist governments and movements that came to power promising justice and moral renewal, only to preside over authoritarian crackdowns, corruption, or economic mismanagement that left their own constituents disillusioned.

== See also ==
- International propagation of Salafism and Wahhabism
- Petro-Islam
- Ahmadiyya
- Contemporary Islamic philosophy
- Islamistan
- Islamization of knowledge
- Islam and modernity
- World Assembly of Islamic Awakening
- Terrorism
- Anti-LGBTQ rhetoric
- Flagellation

== Sources ==
- Roy, Olivier (1994). The Failure of Political Islam. Harvard University Press. ISBN 9780674291409. "The Failure of Political Islam muslim world league."
