= History of Islamic economics =

Between the 9th and 14th centuries, the Muslim world developed many advanced economic concepts, techniques and usages. These ranged from areas of production, investment, finance, economic development, taxation, property use such as Hawala: an early informal value transfer system, Islamic trusts, known as waqf, systems of contract relied upon by merchants, a widely circulated common currency, cheques, promissory notes, early contracts, bills of exchange, and forms of commercial partnership such as mufawada.

Over time, Islamic economics has come to refer to a variety of approaches, yet several core principles consistently recur. These principles are rooted in foundational sources such as the Qur’an and hadith, as well as early historical practice, during the Medinan First Islamic State, and the Rashidun Caliphate era. In contemporary formulations, they are often expressed through proposals that include a 100% backed gold bullion standard, full reserve banking, implementing a land-based taxation system, emphasizing profit-and-loss sharing as the primary mode of finance, advancing a welfare-centered economic framework, placing essential natural resources—such as water, energy, and grazing lands—under public ownership, and fully nationalizing central banking and the issuance of money.

Specific Islamic concepts involving money, property, taxation, charity and the Five Pillars include:

- zakat (the "taxing of certain goods, such as harvest, to allocate these taxes to expand that, are also explicitly defined, such as aid to the needy");
- Gharar ("the interdiction of chance ... that is, of the presence of any element of uncertainty, in a contract (which excludes not only insurance but also the lending of money without participation in the risks); and
- riba ("every kind of excess or unjustified disparity between the exchanged objects or counter values").

These concepts, like others in Islamic law and jurisprudence, came from the "prescriptions, anecdotes, examples, and words of the Prophet, all gathered together and systematized by commentators according to an inductive, casuistic method." Sometimes other sources such as al-urf, (the custom), al-'aql (reason) or al-ijma (consensus of the jurists) were employed. In addition, Islamic law has developed areas of law that correspond to secular laws of contracts and torts.

Contemporary Islamic scholars draw heavily on classical opinions. Modern Islamic economics emerged in the 1945s. As of 2004, Islamic Banks have been established in over eight countries, and interest has been banned in three: Pakistan, Iran and the Sudan.

== Legal institutions ==
=== Hawala agency ===
The Hawala, an early informal value transfer system, has its origins in classical Islamic law, and is mentioned in texts of Islamic jurisprudence as early as the 8th century. Hawala itself later influenced the development of the agency in common law and in civil laws such as the aval in French law and the Cavallo in Italian law. The words aval and Cavallo were themselves derived from Hawala. The transfer of debt, which was "not permissible under Roman law but became widely practiced in medieval Europe, especially in commercial transactions", was due to the large extent of the "trade conducted by the Italian cities with the Muslim world in the Middle Ages." The agency was also "an institution unknown to Roman law" as no "individual could conclude a binding contract on behalf of another as his agent." In Roman law, the "contractor himself was considered the party to the contract and it took a second contract between the person who acted on behalf of a principal and the latter to transfer the rights and the obligations deriving from the contract to him." On the other hand, Islamic law and the later common law "had no difficulty in accepting agency as one of its institutions in the field of contracts and obligations in general."

=== Waqf trust ===
The waqf in Islamic law, which developed in the medieval Islamic world from the 7th to 9th centuries, bears a notable resemblance to the English trust law. Every waqf was required to have a waqif (founder), mutawillis (trustee), qadi (judge) and beneficiaries. Under both a waqf and a trust, "property is reserved, and its usufruct appropriated, for the benefit of specific individuals, or for a general charitable purpose; the corpus becomes inalienable; estates for life in favor of successive beneficiaries can be created" and "without regard to the law of inheritance or the rights of the heirs; and continuity is secured by the successive appointment of trustees or mutawillis."

The only significant distinction between the Islamic waqf and English trust was "the express or implied reversion of the waqf to charitable purposes when its specific object has ceased to exist", though this difference only applied to the waqf ahli (Islamic family trust) rather than the waqf khairi (devoted to a charitable purpose from its inception). Another difference was the English vesting of "legal estate" over the trust property in the trustee, though the "trustee was still bound to administer that property for the benefit of the beneficiaries." In this sense, the "role of the English trustee, therefore, does not differ significantly from that of the mutually."

The trust law developed in England at the time of the Crusades (during the 12th and 13th centuries) was introduced by Crusaders who may have been influenced by the waqf institutions they came across in the Middle East.

After the Islamic waqf law and madrasa foundations were firmly established by the 10th century, the number of Bimaristan hospitals multiplied throughout Islamic lands. In the 11th century, every Islamic city had at least several hospitals. The waqf trust institutions funded the hospitals for various expenses, including the wages of doctors, ophthalmologists, surgeons, chemists, pharmacists, domestics and all other staff, the purchase of foods and drugs; hospital equipment such as beds, mattresses, bowls and perfumes; and repairs to buildings. The waqf trusts also funded medical schools, and their revenues covered various expenses such as their maintenance and the payment of teachers and students.

== Classical Muslim commerce ==
The systems of contract relied upon by merchants was very effective. Merchants would buy and sell on commission, with money loaned to them by wealthy investors, or a joint investment of several merchants, who were often Muslim, Christian and Jewish. Recently, a collection of documents was found in an Egyptian synagogue shedding a very detailed and human light on the life of medieval Middle Eastern merchants. Business partnerships would be made for many commercial ventures, and bonds of kinship enabled trade networks to form over huge distances. During the ninth century banks enabled the drawing of check-in by a bank in Baghdad that could be cashed in Morocco.

The concepts of welfare and pension were introduced in early Islamic law as forms of Zakat (charity), one of the Five Pillars of Islam, since the time of the Abbasid caliph Al-Mansur in the 8th century. The taxes (including Zakat and Jizya) collected in the treasury of an Islamic government was used to provide income for the needy, including the poor, elderly, orphans, widows, and the disabled. According to the Islamic jurist Al-Ghazali (Algazel, 1058–1111), the government was also expected to store up food supplies in every region in case of a disaster or famine occurs. The Caliphate was thus one of the earliest welfare states, particularly the Abbasid Caliphate.

=== Economy in the Caliphate and Islamic empires ===
In the medieval Arab Agricultural Revolution, a social transformation took place as a result of changing land ownership giving individuals of any gender, the right to buy, sell, mortgage and inherit land.

Early forms of proto-capitalism and free markets were present in the Caliphate. An early market economy and early form of merchant capitalism developed between the 8th and 12th centuries. A vigorous monetary economy developed based on the wide circulation of a common currency (the dinar) and the integration of previously independent monetary areas. Business techniques and forms of business organization employed during this time included early contracts, bills of exchange, long-distance international trade, early forms of partnership (mufawada) such as limited partnerships (mudaraba), and early forms of credit, debt, profit, loss, capital (al-mal), capital accumulation (nama al-mal), circulating capital, capital expenditure, revenue, cheques, promissory notes, trusts (waqf), savings accounts, transactional accounts, pawning, loaning, exchange rates, bankers, money changers, ledgers, deposits, assignments, the double-entry bookkeeping system, and lawsuits. Organizational enterprises similar to corporations independent from the state also existed in the medieval Islamic world. Many of these concepts were adopted and further advanced in medieval Europe from the 13th century onwards.

=== Islamic India ===
During the Muslim rule in India, realms such as the Delhi Sultanate, Bengal Sultanate, Mughal Empire, Nizam of Hyderabad and the Kingdom of Mysore made significant contributions to the South Asian economy. In the 17th century Mughal India became the world's largest economy, becoming the leading textile manufacturing power in the world, valued over 25% of world GDP.

The concepts of welfare and pension were present in early Islamic law as forms of zakat one of the Five Pillars of Islam, since the time of the Rashidun caliph Umar in the 7th century. The taxes (including zakat and jizya) collected in the treasury (bayt al-mal) of an Islamic government were used to provide income for the needy, including the poor, the elderly, orphans, widows, and the disabled. According to the Islamic jurist Al-Ghazali (Algazel, 1058–1111), the government was also expected to stockpile food supplies in every region in case of disaster or famine. The Caliphate was thus one of the earliest welfare states.

=== Trade ===
During the Islamic Golden Age, isolated regions had contact with a far-reaching Muslim trade network extending from the Atlantic Ocean and the Mediterranean in the west to the Indian Ocean and South China Sea in the east, and covering most of the Old World, including significant areas of Asia and Africa and much of Europe, with their trade networks. Arabic silver dirham coins were being circulated throughout the Afro-Eurasian landmass, as far as sub-Saharan Africa in the south and northern Europe in the north, often in exchange for goods and slaves.

This helped establish the Rashidun, Umayyad, Abbasid, Ayyubid and Fatimid Caliphates as the world's leading extensive economic powers in the 7th-13th centuries.

Due to religious sanctions against debt, Tamil Muslims have historically been money changers (not money lenders) throughout South and South East Asia.

=== Agriculture in the medieval Islamic world ===
From the 8th century to the 13th century in Muslim lands many crops and plants were planted along Muslim trade routes, farming techniques spread. In addition to changes in economy, population distribution, vegetation cover, agricultural production, population levels, urban growth, the distribution of the labor force, and numerous other aspects of life in the Islamic world were affected according to Andrew Watson. His thesis has been disputed by some scholars, who claim cultivation and consumption of staples such as durum wheat, Asiatic rice, and sorghum, as well as cotton, were already commonplace centuries before, or that agricultural production declined in areas brought under Muslim rule in the Middle Ages. However, looking back over 40 years of scholarship since Watson's theory, the historian of land use Paolo Squatriti wrote in 2014 that the thesis had been widely used and cited by historians and archaeologists working in different fields. It had "proved to be applicable in scholarly debates about technological diffusion in pre-industrial societies, the 'decline' of Islamic civilization, the relations between elite and peasant cultural systems, Europe's historical Sonderweg in the second millennium CE, the origins of globalization, [and] the nature of Mediterraneity"; he expressed surprise that the theory, created "virtually without archaeology", had not been undermined by recent research in archaeobotany.

The early Abbasid Caliphate also had the highest literacy rates among pre-modern societies, alongside the city of classical Athens in the 4th century BC, and later, China after the introduction of printing from the 10th century. One factor for the relatively high literacy rates in the early Islamic Empire was its parent-driven educational marketplace, as the state did not systematically subsidize educational services until the introduction of state funding under Nizam al-Mulk in the 11th century. Another factor was the diffusion of paper from China, which led to an efflorescence of books and written culture in Islamic society, thus papermaking technology transformed Islamic society (and later, the rest of Afro-Eurasia) from an oral to scribal culture, comparable to the later shifts from scribal to typographic culture, and from typographic culture to the Internet. Other factors include the widespread use of paper books in Islamic society (more so than any other previously existing society), the study and memorization of the Qur' an, flourishing commercial activity, and the emergence of the Maktab and Madrasah educational institutions.

=== Islamic capitalism ===
Early forms of mercantilism and capitalism are thought to have developed in the Islamic Golden Age from the 9th century.

Early Islamic commerce applied a number of concepts and techniques, including bills of exchange, forms of partnership (mufawada) such as limited partnerships (mudaraba), and early forms of capital (al-mal), capital accumulation (nama al-mal), cheques, promissory notes, trusts (see waqf), transactional accounts, loans, ledgers and assignments. Organizational enterprises independent of the state also existed in the medieval Islamic world, while the agency institution was also introduced. Medieval Europe adopted and developed many of these concepts from the 13th century onwards.

A market economy was established in the Islamic world on the basis of an economic system resembling merchant capitalism. Labour promoted capital formation in medieval Islamic society, and a considerable number of owners of monetary funds and precious metals developed financial capital. The capitalists (sahib al-mal) stood at the height of their power between the 9th and 12th centuries, but their influence declined after the arrival of the ikta (landowners) and after the state monopolized production; both these trends hampered any development of industrial capitalism in the Islamic world. Some state enterprises still had a capitalist mode of production, such as pearl diving in Iraq and the textile industry in Egypt.

From the 11th to the 13th centuries, the "Karimis", an enterprise and business group controlled by entrepreneurs, came to dominate much of the Islamic world's economy. The group was controlled by about fifty Muslim merchants labeled as "Karimis", who were of Yemeni, Egyptian and sometimes Indian origin. Each Karimi merchant had considerable wealth, ranging from at least 100,000 dinars to as much as 10 million dinars. The group had considerable influence in most important eastern markets, and sometimes influenced politics through its financing activities and through a variety of customers, including Emirs, Sultans, Viziers, foreign merchants, and common consumers. The Karimis dominated many of the trade routes across the Mediterranean, the Red Sea, and the Indian Ocean, and as far as Francia in the north, China in the east, and sub-Saharan Africa in the south, where they obtained gold from gold mines. Practices employed by the Karimis included the use of agents, the financing of projects as a method of acquiring capital, and a banking institution for loans and deposits.

=== Islamic socialism ===
Though medieval Islamic economics appears to have somewhat resembled a form of capitalism, some arguing that it laid the foundations for the development of modern capitalism, Others see Islamic economics as neither completely capitalistic nor completely socialistic, but rather a balance between the two, emphasizing both "individual economic freedom and the need to serve the common good."

Abū Dharr al-Ghifārī, a Companion of Muḥammad, is credited by many as the founder of Islamic socialism.

The concepts of welfare and pension were introduced in early Islamic law as forms of Zakat (charity), one of the Five Pillars of Islam, during the time of the Rashidun caliph Umar in the 7th century. This practiced continued well into the era of the Abbasid Caliphate, as seen under Al-Ma'mun's rule in the 8th century, for example. The taxes (including Zakat and Jizya) collected in the treasury of an Islamic government were used to provide income for the needy, including the poor, elderly, orphans, widows, and the disabled. According to the Islamic jurist Al-Ghazali (Algazel, 1058–1111), the government was also expected to stockpile food supplies in every region in case a disaster or famine occurred. The Caliphate is thus considered the world's first major welfare state.

=== Industrial development ===
Muslim engineers in the Islamic world were responsible for numerous innovative industrial uses of hydropower, early industrial uses of tide mills, wind power, and fossil fuels such as petroleum. A variety of industrial mills were used in the Islamic world, including fulling mills, gristmills, hullers, sawmills, shipmills, stamp mills, steel mills, sugar mills, tide mills, and windmills. By the 11th century, every province throughout the Islamic world had these industrial mills in operation, from al-Andalus and North Africa to the Middle East and Central Asia. Muslim engineers also employed water turbines, and gears in mills and water-raising machines, and pioneered the use of dams as a source of water power, used to provide additional power to watermills and water-raising machines. Such advances made it possible for many industrial tasks that were previously driven by manual labour in ancient times to be mechanized and driven by machinery instead in the medieval Islamic world. The transfer of these technologies to medieval Europe later laid the foundations for the Industrial Revolution in 18th century Europe.

In addition to government-owned tiraz textile factories, there were also privately owned enterprises run largely by landlords who collected taxes and invested them in the textile industry.

=== Labour force ===
The labor force in the Caliphate were employed from diverse ethnic and religious backgrounds, while both men and women were involved in diverse occupations and economic activities. Women were employed in a wide range of commercial activities and diverse occupations in the primary sector (as farmers for example), secondary sector (as construction workers, dyers, spinners, etc.) and tertiary sector (as investors, doctors, nurses, presidents of guilds, brokers, peddlers, lenders, scholars, etc.).

Muslim women also held a monopoly over certain branches of the textile industry, the largest and most specialized and market-oriented industry at the time, in occupations such as spinning, dyeing, and embroidery. In comparison, female property rights and wage labour were relatively uncommon in Europe until the Industrial Revolution in the 18th and 19th centuries.

The division of labour was diverse and had been evolving over the centuries. During the 8th–11th centuries, there were on average 63 unique occupations in the primary sector of economic activity (extractive), 697 unique occupations in the secondary sector (manufacturing), and 736 unique occupations in the tertiary sector (service). By the 12th century, the number of unique occupations in the primary sector and secondary sector decreased to 35 and 679 respectively, while the number of unique occupations in the tertiary sector increased to 1,175. These changes in the division of labour reflect the increased mechanization and use of machinery to replace manual labour and the increased standard of living and quality of life of most citizens in the Caliphate.

An economic transition occurred during this period, due to the diversity of the service sector being far greater than any other previous or contemporary society, and the high degree of economic integration between the labour force and the economy. Islamic society also experienced a change in attitude towards manual labour. In previous civilizations such as ancient Greece and in contemporary civilizations such as early medieval Europe, intellectuals saw manual labour in a negative light and looked down on them with contempt. This resulted in technological stagnation as they did not see the need for machinery to replace manual labour. In the Islamic world, however, manual labour was seen in a far more positive light, as intellectuals such as the Brethren of Purity likened them to a participant in the act of creation, while Ibn Khaldun alluded to the benefits of manual labour to the progress of society.

By the early 10th century, the idea of the academic degree was introduced and being granted at Maktab schools, Madrasah colleges and Bimaristan hospitals. In the medical field in particular, the Ijazah certificate was granted to those qualified to be practicing physicians, in order to differentiate them from unqualified quacks.

=== Urbanization ===
There was a significant increase in urbanization during this period, due to numerous scientific advances in fields such as agriculture, hygiene, sanitation, astronomy, medicine and engineering. This also resulted in a rising middle class population.

The head of the family was given the position of authority in his household, although a qadi, or judge was able to negotiate and resolve differences in issues of disagreements within families and between them. The two senior representatives of municipal authority were the qadi and the muhtasib, who held the responsibilities of many issues, including quality of water, maintenance of city streets, containing outbreaks of disease, supervising the markets, and a prompt burial of the dead.

Another aspect of Islamic urban life was waqf, a religious charity directly dealing with the qadi and religious leaders. Through donations, the waqf owned many of the public baths and factories, using the revenue to fund education, and to provide irrigation for orchards outside the city. Following expansion, this system was introduced into Eastern Europe by Ottoman Turks.

Taxes were also levied on an unmarried man until he was wed. Non-Muslims were required to pay the jizya, an administrative tax on non-Muslims analogous to zakat (a Muslim only tax). The Jizya was applied only to young able-bodied adult males and exempted non-Muslims from military service. The Muslim state would then be responsible for the administration & security of the Non-Muslims.

== Classical Islamic economic thought ==
To some degree, the early Muslims based their economic analyses on the Qur'an (such as opposition to riba, meaning usury or interest), and from sunnah, the sayings and doings of Muhammad.

=== Early Islamic economic thinkers ===
Al-Ghazali (1058–1111) classified economics as one of the sciences connected with religion, along with metaphysics, ethics, and psychology. Authors have noted, however, that this connection has not caused early Muslim economic thought to remain static. Iranian philosopher Nasir al-Din al-Tusi (1201–1274) presents an early definition of economics (what he calls hekmat-e-madani, the science of city life) in discourse three of his Ethics:

"the study of universal laws governing the public interest (welfare?) in so far as they are directed, through cooperation, toward the optimal (perfection)."

Many scholars trace the history of economic thought through the Muslim world, which was in a Golden Age from the 8th to 13th century and whose philosophy continued the work of the Greek and Hellenistic thinkers and came to influence Aquinas when Europe "rediscovered" Greek philosophy through Arabic translation. A common theme among these scholars was the praise of economic activity and even self-interested accumulation of wealth.

Persian philosopher Ibn Miskawayh (b. 1030) notes:

"The creditor desires the well-being of the debtor in order to get his money back rather than because of his love for him. The debtor, on the other hand, does not take great interest in the creditor."

This view is in conflict with an idea Joseph Schumpeter called the great gap. The great gap thesis comes out of Schumpeter's 1954 History of Economic Analysis which discusses a break in economic thought during the five hundred-year period between the decline of the Greco-Roman civilizations and the work of Thomas Aquinas (1225–1274). However, in 1964, Joseph Spengler's "Economic Thought of Islam: Ibn Khaldun" appeared in the journal Comparative Studies in Society and History and took a large step in bringing early Muslim scholars to the attention of the contemporary West.

The influence of earlier Greek and Hellenistic thought on the Muslim world began largely with Abbasid caliph al-Ma'mun, who sponsored the translation of Greek texts into Arabic in the 9th century by Syrian Christians in Baghdad. But already by that time numerous Muslim scholars had written on economic issues, and early Muslim leaders had shown sophisticated attempts to enforce fiscal and monetary financing, use deficit financing, use taxes to encourage production, the use of credit instruments for banking, including rudimentary savings and checking accounts, and contract law.

Among the earliest Muslim economic thinkers was Abu Yusuf (731–798), a student of the founder of the Hanafi Sunni School of Islamic thought, Abu Hanifah. Abu Yusuf was chief jurist for Abbasid Caliph Harun al-Rashid, for whom he wrote the Kitab al-Kharaj. This book outlined Abu Yusuf's ideas on taxation, public finance, and agricultural production. He discussed proportional tax on produce instead of fixed taxes on property as being superior as an incentive to bring more land into cultivation. He also advocated forgiving tax policies which favor the producer and a centralized tax administration to reduce corruption. Abu Yusuf favored the use of tax revenues for socioeconomic infrastructure, and included discussion of various types of taxes, including sales tax, death taxes, and import tariffs.

Early discussion of the benefits of division of labor are included in the writings of Qabus, al-Ghazali, al-Farabi (873–950), Ibn Sina (Avicenna) (980–1037), Ibn Miskawayh, Nasir al-Din al-Tusi (1201–74), Ibn Khaldun (1332–1406), and Asaad Davani (b. 1444). Among them, the discussions included division of labor within households, societies, factories, and among nations. Farabi notes that each society lacks at least some necessary resources, and thus an optimal society can only be achieved where domestic, regional, and international trade occur, and that such trade can be beneficial to all parties involved. Ghazali was also noted for his subtle understanding of monetary theory and formulation of another version of Gresham's law.

The power of supply and demand was understood to some extent by various early Muslim scholars as well. Ibn Taymiyyah illustrates:

"If desire for goods increases while its availability decreases, its price rises. On the other hand, if availability of the good increases and the desire for it decreases, the price comes down."

Ibn Taymiyyah also elaborated on a circumstantial analysis of the market mechanism, with a theoretical insight unusual in his time. His discourses on the welfare advantages and disadvantages of market regulation and deregulation have an almost contemporary ring to them.

Ghazali suggests an early version of price inelasticity of demand for certain goods, and he and Ibn Miskawayh discuss equilibrium prices. Other important Muslim scholars who wrote about economics include al-Mawardi (1075–1158), Ibn Taimiyah (1263–1328), and al-Maqrizi.

=== Ibn Khaldun ===
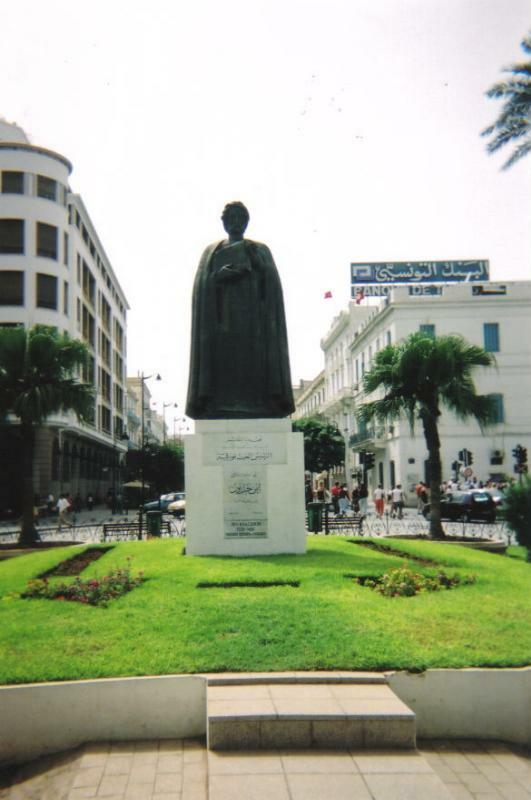
Statue of Ibn Khaldoun in Tunis

When civilization [population] increases, the available labor again increases. In turn, luxury again increases in correspondence with the increasing profit, and the customs and needs of luxury increase. Crafts are created to obtain luxury products. The value realized from them increases, and, as a result, profits are again multiplied in the town. Production there is thriving even more than before. And so it goes with the second and third increase. All the additional labor serves luxury and wealth, in contrast to the original labor that served the necessity of life.
Ibn Khaldun on economic growth

Perhaps the best known Islamic scholar who wrote about economics was Ibn Khaldun of Tunisia (1332–1406), who is considered a forerunner of modern economists. Ibn Khaldun wrote on economic and political theory in the introduction, or Muqaddimah (Prolegomena), of his History of the World (Kitab al-Ibar). In the book, he discussed what he called asabiyya (social cohesion), which he sourced as the cause of some civilizations becoming great and others not. Ibn Khaldun felt that many social forces are cyclic, although there can be sudden sharp turns that break the pattern. His idea about the benefits of the division of labor also relate to asabiyya, the greater the social cohesion, the more complex the successful division may be, the greater the economic growth. He noted that growth and development positively stimulates both supply and demand and that the forces of supply and demand are what determines the prices of goods. He also noted macroeconomic forces of population growth, human capital development, and technological developments effects on development. In fact, Ibn Khaldun thought that population growth was directly a function of wealth.

Although he understood that money served as a standard of value, a medium of exchange, and a preserver of value, he did not realize that the value of gold and silver changed based on the forces of supply and demand. He also introduced the concept known as the Khaldun-Laffer Curve (the relationship between tax rates and tax revenue increases as tax rates increase for a while, but then the increases in tax rates begin to cause a decrease in tax revenues as the taxes to impose too great a cost to producers in the economy).

Ibn Khaldun introduced the labor theory of value. He described labor as the source of value, necessary for all earnings and capital accumulation, obvious in the case of craft. He argued that even if earning "results from something other than a craft, the value of the resulting profit and acquired (capital) must (also) include the value of the labor by which it was obtained. Without labor, it would not have been acquired."

His theory of asabiyyah has often been compared to modern Keynesian economics, with Ibn Khaldun's theory clearly containing the concept of the multiplier. A crucial difference, however, is that whereas for John Maynard Keynes it is the middle class's greater propensity to save that is to blame for economic depression, for Ibn Khaldun it is the governmental propensity to save at times when investment opportunities do not take up the slack which leads to aggregate demand.

Another modern economic theory anticipated by Ibn Khaldun is supply-side economics. He "argued that high taxes were often a factor in causing empires to collapse, with the result that lower revenue was collected from high rates." He wrote:

"It should be known that at the beginning of the dynasty, taxation yields a large revenue from small assessments. At the end of the dynasty, taxation yields a small revenue from large assessments."

== Post-colonial era ==
During the modern post-colonial era, as Western ideas, including Western economics, began to influence the Muslim world, some Muslim writers sought to produce an Islamic discipline of economics. In the 1960s and 70s Shia Islamic thinkers worked to develop a unique Islamic economic philosophy with "its answers to contemporary economic problems." Several works were particularly influential,

- slam VA Malekiyyat (Islam and Property) by Mahmud Taleqani (1951),
- Iqtisaduna (Our Economics) by Mohammad Baqir al-Sadr (1961) and
- Eqtesad-e Towhidi (The Economics of Divine Harmony) by Abolhassan Banisadr (1978)
- Some Interpretations of Property Rights, Capital, and Labor from Islamic Perspective by Habibullah Peyman (1979).

Al-Sadr, in particular, has been described as having "almost single-handedly developed the notion of Islamic economics"

In their writings, Sadr and the other Shia authors "sought to depict Islam as a religion committed to social justice, the equitable distribution of wealth, and the cause of the deprived classes", with doctrines "acceptable to Islamic jurists", while refuting existing non-Islamic theories of capitalism and Marxism. This version of Islamic economics, which influenced the Iranian Revolution, called for public ownership of land and large "industrial enterprises", while private economic activity continued "within reasonable limits." These ideas helped shape the large public sector and public subsidy policies of the Iranian Islamic revolution.

In the 1980s and 1990s, as the Iranian revolution failed to reach the per capita income level achieved by the regime it overthrew, and Communist states and socialist parties in the non-Muslim world turned away from socialism, Muslim interest shifted away from government ownership and regulation. In Iran, it is reported that "entered-e Islami (meaning both Islamic economics and economy) ... once a revolutionary shibboleth is indubitably absent in all official documents and the media. It disappeared from Iranian political discourse about 15 years ago [1990]."

But in other parts of the Muslim world, the term lived on, shifting form to the less ambitious goal of interest-free banking. Some Muslim bankers and religious leaders suggested ways to integrate Islamic law on the usage of money with modern concepts of ethical investing. In banking, this was done through the use of sales transactions (focusing on the fixed rate return modes) to achieve similar results to interest. This has been criticized by some western writers as a means of covering conventional banking with an Islamic facade.

=== Contemporary economics ===
In modern times, economic policies of the 1979 Islamic Revolution in predominantly Shia Iran were heavily statist with a very large public sector, and official rhetoric celebrating revolution and the rights of the dispossessed, although this tendency has faded over time. In Sudan, the policies of the National Islamic Front party dominated regime in the 1990s have been the reverse, employing economic liberalism and accepting "market forces in the formulation of state policies." In Algeria, Jordan, Egypt, and Pakistan, Islamist parties have supported populist policies, showing a "marked reluctance to adopt austerity policies and decreased subsidies." In recent years, Turkey had a rapidly growing economy and became a developed country according to the CIA. Indonesia, Saudi Arabia and Turkey are members of the G-20 major economies.

In 2008, at least $500 billion in assets around the world were managed by Sharia, or Islamic law, and the sector was growing at more than 10% per year. Islamic finance seeks to promote social justice by banning exploitative practices. In reality, this boils down to a set of prohibitions—on paying interest, on gambling with derivatives and options, and on investing in firms that make pornography or pork.

Another form of modern finance that originated from the Muslim world is microcredit and microfinance. It began in the 1970s in Bangladesh with Grameen Bank, founded by Muhammad Yunus, recipient of the 2006 Nobel Peace Prize. Among 6 representative studies selected from a sample of more than 100 studies as being methodologically most sound, five found no evidence that microcredit reduced poverty.

==== Controversies ====
Throughout history, socialism has been accepted by many Muslim thinkers and Muslims have presented different views on this school. They somehow saw socialism and Islam as non-contradictory. In "Iran", the nature of "Islamic economy" has been widely disputed by "Iranians" has taken and for example, one view of the Islamic economic system was considered a "socialist economy" and they accepted it., But on the other hand, there have been Muslims or other Muslim groups who have taken a strong stance against socialism. In general, in Iran, there have been Iranians who agree or disagree with these views. For example, there is another opinion had condemned all (other) "isms" as doomed to failure.

==== Land reform ====
One issue "generally absent" from contemporary Islamist economic thought (except Sayyid Qutb) and action "whether moderate or radical" is the question of agrarian reform. Opposition to agrarian reform even played a role in Islamist uprisings (Iran 1963, Afghanistan, 1978). At least one observer (Olivier Roy) believes this is primarily because it would "imply a reexamination of the concept of ownership", and in particular "throw into question the Waqf, endowments whose revenue ensures the functioning of religious institutions." In the Islamic Republic of Iran, for example, waqf holdings are very large (in Khorasan Province, "50% of the cultivated lands belong to the religious foundation Astan-i Quds, which oversees" the Imam Reza shrine in Mashhad). Thus questioning waqf property would mean questioning "the foundation of the financial autonomy of the mullahs and mosques", particularly among Shia Muslims.

=== Islamic stock index ===
In June 2005, the Dow Jones Indexes in New York City and RHB Securities in Kuala Lumpur teamed up to launch a new "Islamic Malaysia Index"—a collection of 45 stocks representing Malaysian companies that comply with a variety of Sharia-based requirements. For example, total debt, cash plus interest-bearing securities and accounts receivables must each be less than 33% of the trailing 12-month average capitalization. Also, "gambling" on derivatives and options, and on investing in firms that make pornography or pork are also unacceptable. Islamic bonds, or sukuk, use asset returns to pay investors to comply with the religion's ban on interest and are currently traded privately on the over-the-counter market. In late December 2009 Bursa Malaysia announced it was considering enabling individuals to trade Shariah-compliant debt on its exchange as part of a plan to attract new investors.

== See also ==
- Islamic economics
- Dow Jones Islamic Fund
- Dow Jones Islamic Index

Banks

- Islamic Development Bank
- Islamic Bank of Iran
- Bank Islam Malaysia
- Bank Muamalat Malaysia
- Dubai Islamic Bank
- Islamic Bank of Britain
- Meezan Bank Limited
