= Saadoun al-Qaisi =

Iraqi security official

- Arabic: سعدون صبري القيسي
- Born: Saadoun Sabri Jamil Jumaa al-Qaisi; 1947
- Died: February 2026 (aged 78–79)
- Cause of death: Execution by hanging
- Occupation: Security officer
- Conviction: Crimes against humanity
- Penalty: Death

Details
- Span of crimes: 1977–2003
- Country: Iraq
- Date apprehended: January 2025

Saadoun al-Qaisi (full name Saadoun Sabri Jamil Jumaa al-Qaisi; Arabic: سعدون صبري القيسي; 1947 – February 2026) was an Iraqi security officer. He reached the rank of major general in the Directorate of General Security under President Saddam Hussein, and was executed in 2026 after being convicted of crimes against humanity for his part in the 1980 killing of the Shia cleric Muhammad Baqir al-Sadr.

== Background ==
Al-Qaisi was born in 1947. According to Iraq's National Security Service, the posts al-Qaisi held between 1977 and 2003 included director of the Fifth Division of the Directorate of General Security, head of security for the governorates of Basra, Maysan and Najaf, director of economic security and director of general political affairs.

After the overthrow of Saddam Hussein's government in 2003, al-Qaisi left the country. He reportedly lived in Syria under the alias "Hajj Saleh" before returning to Iraq, where he settled in Erbil in February 2023.

== Arrest and conviction ==
Iraq's National Security Service announced in late January 2025 that al-Qaisi and four other former officials had been arrested, describing them as "some of the most notorious criminals from the former regime" and holding them responsible for the deaths of al-Sadr, his sister Bint al-Huda and thousands of other Iraqis.

The service said that al-Qaisi had confessed, during an interrogation lasting more than fifty hours, to personally executing al-Sadr and his sister with his own weapon, and to carrying out mass executions of people accused of belonging to the Islamic Dawa Party. These, it said, included 80 people buried in mass graves near Fallujah and at the Diyala bridge between 1979 and 1985, as well as several members of the al-Hakim family.

While in custody, al-Qaisi guided Iraq's Martyrs Foundation to a mass grave in the Saqlawiyah district of Fallujah, in Anbar province. The foundation said the remains of at least five people had been recovered from a site where executions were carried out in rounds of 20 to 25 people.

On 30 June 2025 an Iraqi criminal court sentenced al-Qaisi and a second former officer, Haitham Abdul Aziz, to death after convicting them of taking part in the 1980 execution of al-Sadr and his sister and of killings of other civilians and Dawa Party members.

== Execution ==
The National Security Service announced on 9 February 2026 that al-Qaisi had been executed by hanging. Its spokesman, Arshad al-Hakim, said the sentence had been carried out after "the completion of all judicial procedures, investigations and intelligence follow-up". The agency did not say when the execution took place.

Adnan Fayhan al-Dulaimi, the First Deputy Speaker of the Council of Representatives, welcomed the execution, saying that it did justice to the memory of al-Sadr and sent "a clear message that crimes do not expire with time".
