= Panja Sharif, Delhi =

Dargah Panja Sharif
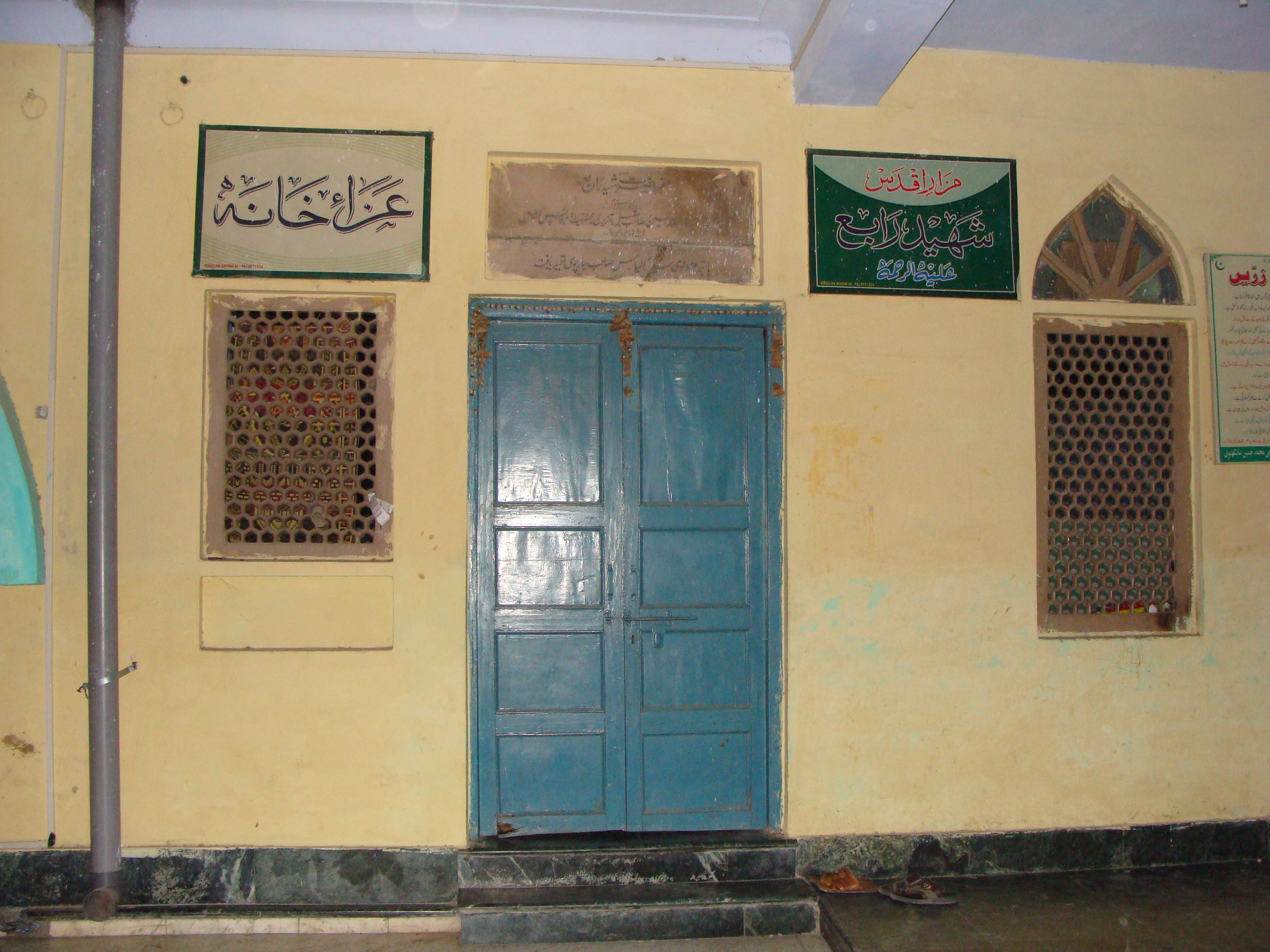
- Burial chamber of Mirza Muhammad Kamil Dehlavi in the mosque grounds

- Location in Greater Delhi

Religion
- Affiliation: Shia Islam
- Ecclesiastical or organizational status: Dargah; Madrasa; Karbala

Location
- Location: Central Delhi
- Country: India
- Interactive map of Dargah Panja Sharif
- Coordinates: 28°39′3″N 77°13′59″E

Architecture
- Style: Contemporary architecture
- Shrine: One (Imam Husayn Shrine)

The Panja Sharif (or Punja Shareef) the oldest Karbala in the city of Delhi, India. It is located at Kashmiri Gate. It is a major majlis khana (meeting place) used for Karbala mourning ceremonies.

Maulana Kalbe Rushaid Rizvi has addressed the ashrae majalis (series of 10 majalis) of Panja Sharif Imambargah for many years.

Mirza Muhammad Kamil Dehlavi is buried there.

== See also ==
- Shia Islam in India
- List of mosques in India
