= Zayn al-Din al-Juba'i al-'Amili =

Shia Muslim scholar (1505–1559)

Zayn al-Din al-Juba'i al'Amili
- Title: Ash-Shahid ath-Thani

Personal life
- Born: 1506, Jbaa, Lebanon
- Died: 1559
- Era: Ottoman Empire
- Region: Jabal 'Amel, Damascus, Cairo, Jerusalem
- Notable work: The Beautiful Garden in Interpreting the Damscene Glitter

Religious life
- Religion: Islam
- Denomination: Shia
- Sect: Twelver
- Jurisprudence: Ja'fari

Zayn al-Dīn al-Juba'ī al-Ṭalluṣī al'Amilī (Arabic: زين الدين الجبعي الطلّوسي العاملي; 1506-1559), also known as ash-Shahīd ath-Thanī (Arabic: الشهيد الثاني, ʾash-Shahīd ath-Thānī, lit. 'The Second Martyr') was a Twelver Shia Muslim scholar.

== Early life ==
He was born Zayn al-Dīn bin Nur al-Dīn 'Alī bin Aḥmad bin Muḥammad bin 'Alī bin Jamal al-Dīn bin Taqī bin Sāliḥ bin Mushrif al-'Amilī al-Shamī al-Ṭalluṣī al-Juba'ī, in the village of Jbaa, on the 13th of Shawwal, 911 AH (1506 CE). His father, Sheikh Nur al-Din 'Ali was also a scholar.

His ancestor, Sāliḥ, was a student of Allamah al-Hilli.

== Career and travels ==
Thani studied under both Sunni and Shi'a scholars in Jabal 'Amel, Damascus, Cairo, Jerusalem.

In 1536, he moved to Egypt, where he learned Usul al-Fiqh, geometry, prosody, medicine and logic.

In 1543, he traveled to Constantinople and met with Muhammad bin Muhammad bin Qāḍī Zāda al-Rūmī, with whom he shared multiple treatises relating to several subjects, including mathematics, astronomy and religion. The latter offered him the highest teaching position in a school of his choice, which was eventually the Nuriyya School of Baalbek.

== Legacy ==
His Magnum opus is the first commentary of The Damascene Glitter by Shahid Awwal called The Beautiful Garden in Interpreting the Damscene Glitter (Arabic: ar-Rawda-l-Bahiyah fi Sharh allam'a-d-Dimashqiya الروضة البهيّة في شرح اللمعة الدمشقيّة ).

== See also ==
- The Five Martyrs
- Shahid Awwal
- Shahid Thani
- Shahid Salis
- Shahid Rabay
- Shahid Khamis
