= Falsafatuna =

Book by Muhammad Baqir al-Sadr

Falsafatuna is a book by Muhammad Baqir al-Sadr, published in 1959, which has been translated into English as Our Philosophy. It is a critique of European philosophy, especially of capitalism and socialism, from an Islamic viewpoint. It was aimed at secular youth in Iraq, and was written in response to the growth of communist ideas.

== Details ==
The introduction of the book talks about the four major social schools of thought—capitalism, communism and socialism, and Islam. According to Sadr, the capitalist system is "devoid of the philosophy on which every social system must rest...it is a materialistic system, even though it is not based on a clearly outlined materialistic philosophy."(10) Capitalism creates big producers who are constantly in need of larger markets and new countries to sell their products to. The individual feels responsible only for himself and feels like "he is in a constant fight, equipped with no weapons other than his personal powers, and provided with no purposes rather than his personal interests."(14) Sadr then attempts to explain the philosophy and flaws of the Marxist school of thought. He feels that Marx approached society through a materialistic perspective and sought to solve the problem of injust distribution of wealth by reconstructing society on socialist lines. Sadr says that it created a society where there was no motivation for the individual to work harder than needed and the "communist economy clashed with actual human nature". (16) Sadr then explains how Islam reconciles the personal motivations of the human being with social interests by creating morality and ethics. Human beings keep these values in mind and are "expected to evaluate all the steps they take....[according to] the satisfaction of God".(27)

The first part of the book elaborates on The Theory of Knowledge (Epistemology). The first chapter explains the source of human knowledge. Sadr explains the Platonic doctrine of recollection, the theory of Rationalism, the theory of Empiricism, and finally the Islamic Dispossession Theory. Sadr refutes the Platonic doctrine on the basis that the link between the prior existing soul and the body is not justified. He supports Rationalism and says that "innate ideas exist in the soul potentially, and that they acquire the quality of being actual by the development and mental integration of the soul."(43) Sadr states that Empiricism does not provide a logical explanation for causality and philosophers such as George Berkeley and David Hume were unable to provide sufficient explanations for causality solely on the basis of sense perception.

Sadr then explains the stance of the Positivist school of philosophy and labels it as an extension of the Empirical school that refutes philosophical propositions calling them "meaningless" because they are not subject to sense experience and related to what is beyond nature (68). He explains that in this endeavour the positivists contradict themselves by borrowing a metaphysical notion to destroy the idea of metaphysics.(69) Sadr admits towards the end of the chapter that "[rationalist] philosophy assists the empirical method in science by means of rational principles and rules which the scientist employs for the purpose of moving from direct experience to a general scientific law".(71)
