= Mirza Muhammad Kamil Dehlavi =

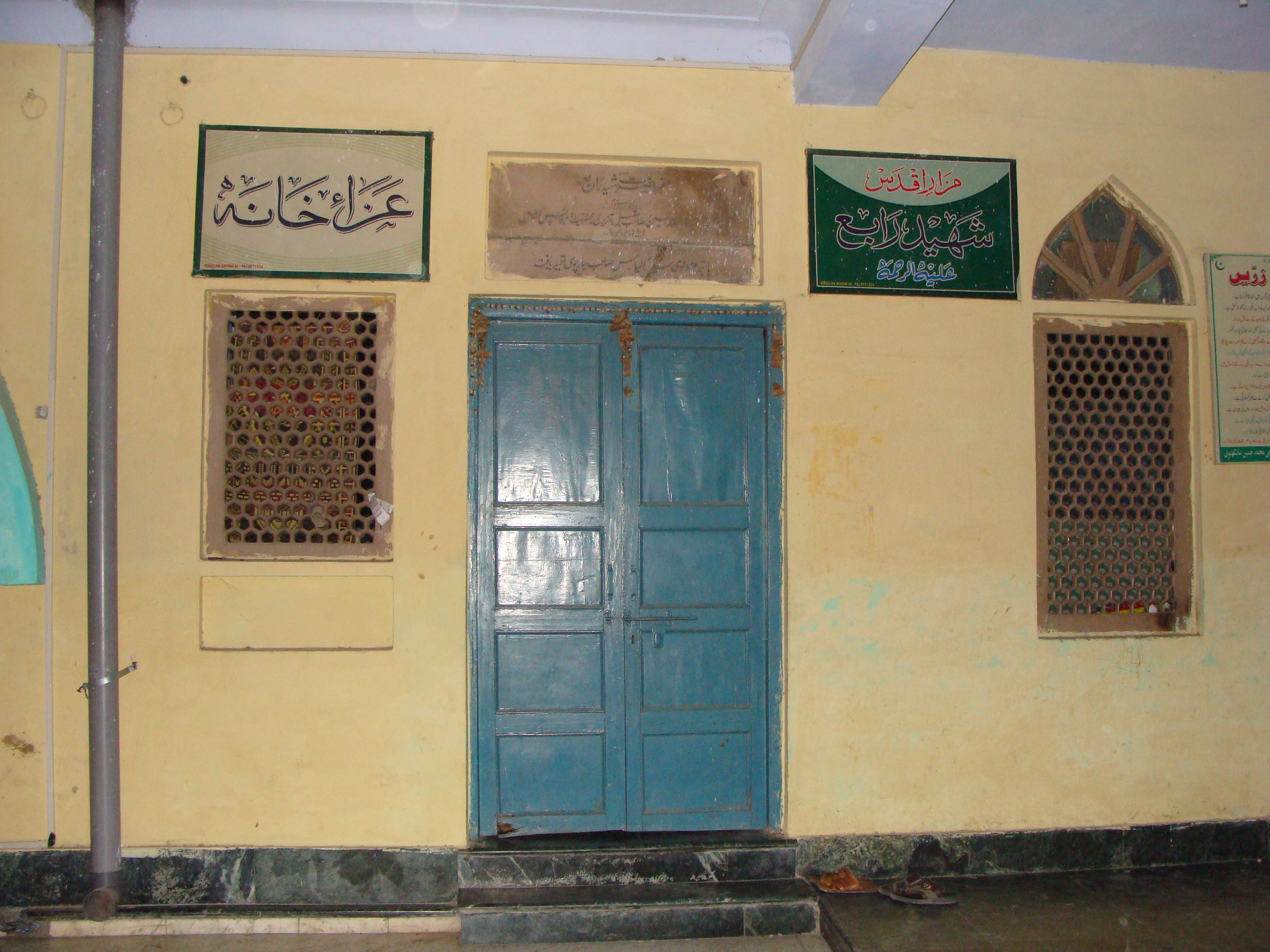
Burial Chamber of Mirza Muhammad Kamil Dehlavi at Panja Sharif, Kashmiri Gate, Delhi

Hakim Mirza Muhammad Kamil Dehlavi (d. 1809/10), also known as Shahid Rabay (The Fourth Martyr) was an Indian Shia author and a practitioner of Unani medicine in Delhi.

== Nuzhat-e-Isna Ashariya ==
He authored Nuzhat-e-Isna Ashariya (نزھۃ اثنا عشريۃ), a complete response to Shah Abdul Aziz Dehlavi's Tauhfa Ithna Ashari. It was due to this book that he was poisoned by the Sunni ruler Nawab of Jhajjhar of Indian state of Jhajhar. He also wrote more than 60 books besides Nuzhat–e-Isna Ashariya.

He is buried at dargah Panja Sharif at Kashmiri Gate, Delhi; alongside him Mufassir-e-Quran Maulana Syed Maqbool Ahmad Dehlavi too is buried. Every year Delhi Shia Waqf Board arranges a five majalis session in the memory of Mirza Muhammad Kamil Dehlavi.

== See also ==
- The Five Martyrs
- Shahid Awwal
- Shahid Thani
- Shahid Salis
- Shahid Rabay
- Shahid Khamis
- Shah Abdul Aziz Dehlavi
- Tauhfa Ithna Ashari
