= Talib Jauhari =

Pakistani historian (1929–2020)

Talib Jauhari علامہ طالب جوہری

Personal life
- Born: 27 August 1929 Patna, Bihar, British India
- Died: 21 June 2020 (aged 90) Karachi, Pakistan
- Era: Modern era
- Main interest(s): Islamic law, Islamic philosophy, Quranic exegesis, Hadith, Ilm al-Kalam, Falsafah, Mantiq
- Notable idea: interpretation (Tafsir) of Quran

Religious life
- Religion: Islam
- Denomination: Shīʿa

Talib Jauhari (27 August 1929 – 21 June 2020) (Urdu: طالب جوہری) was a Pakistani Islamic scholar, Shia Zaakir, poet, historian and philosopher of the Shia Sect of Islam.

He was widely renowned as the most prominent Shia scholar, and his sermons were broadcast on PTV (Pakistan Television Network).

== Career ==
Jauhari was a promoter of Shia-Sunni unity in Pakistan. Allama Talib Jauhari was among the most famous Shia scholars of Pakistan.

Talib Jauhari's speaking style was highly popular among the Pakistani public and he received nationwide fame through Pakistan Television Network (PTV)'s Majlis-e-Shaam-e-Ghareeban religious lecture program.

== Education ==
Jauhari also studied under Sayyid Abu al-Qasim al-Khoei. He was a student of Muhammad Baqir al-Sadr. He was a class fellow of Sayyid Ali Sistani. Zeeshan Haider Jawwadi was also one of his class fellows in Najaf."

== Books ==
Jauhari wrote Hadees e Karabala and several books, including a detailed commentary on the Quran. His book Alamaat e Zahoor e Mehdi is considered as one of the most comprehensive books compiled and written on the topic of Imam Mehdi in Urdu language. He was also a poet, and three compilations of his poetry were published during his lifetime.

The following is a list of his known works:

Tafseer-e-Quran:

- Ahsan al Hadees (Qur'anic exegesis)

Maqtal:

- Hadees e Karabala (on the subject of Imam Husayn ibn Ali and events at Karbala)

Religion:

- Zikray Masoom
- Nizaam Hayat-e-Insani
- Khulafaey Isna A'shr
- Alamatay Zahooray Mahdi (considered as one of the most comprehensive books on the topic of Imam Mahdi (The Awaited Saviour)

Philosophy:

- Aqliyat-e-Ma'asir (2005)

Poetry:

- Harf-e-Namoo (Urdu poetry)
- Pas-e-Afaq (Urdu poetry)
- Shakh e Sada (Urdu poetry)

== Recognition and awards ==
The Government of Pakistan awarded him the Sitara-i-Imtiaz for his contribution in the field of religious activities.

== Death and legacy ==
The 91-year-old Jauhari was admitted to a private hospital on 10 June 2020. He is said to have developed cardiovascular complications and was on ventilator since then, He died on 22 June 2020. However Chief Minister Sindh Murad Ali Shah revealed in a speech at Sindh Assembly that Talib Jauhri, Munawar Hasan and Mufti Naeem, all of the three clerics who died in the past week were due to COVID-19 during the COVID-19 pandemic in Pakistan.

He was survived by three sons, all of them being religious public speakers and orators too, namely: Allama Riaz Jauhari born in 10 October 1959, Allama Asad Jauhari born in 1968 and Allama Amjad Raza Jauhari, born in 1974. He also had three daughters. Prime Minister of Pakistan Imran Khan, President Arif Alvi, Army Chief Qamar Javed Bajwa expressed sadness over his death. Earlier in 2014 his son-in-law Syed Mubarak Raza Kazmi was killed in 'sectarian' attack in Karachi 13/B, Gulshan-e-Iqbal.

== See also ==
- Muhammad Mustafa Jauhar, (Talib Jauhari's father)
