= Zeeshan Haider Jawadi =

Indian Shia scholar (1938–2000)

Syed Zeeshan Haider Jawadi
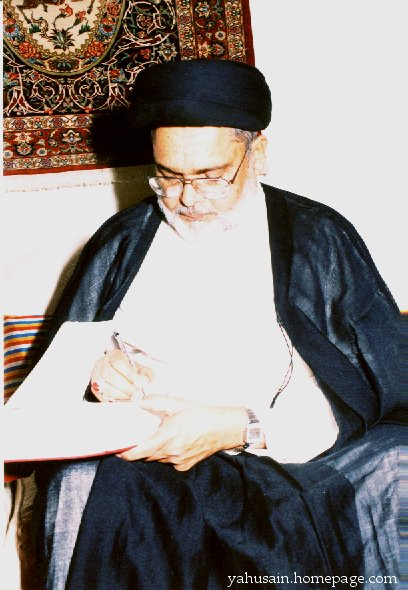
- Born: 17 September 1938; Karari, Allahabad, Uttar Pradhesh, British India
- Died: 15 April 2000 (age 61); Abu Dhabi, UAE

Academic background
- Education: Jamia Nazmia, Lucknow, India
- Influences: Muhammad Baqir al-Sadr

Academic work
- Era: Modern era
- Discipline: Islamic scholar
- School or tradition: Twelver
- Main interests: Islamic law, Islamic philosophy, Quranic exegesis, Hadith, Theology, Mantiq
- Notable works: Translation and commentary (Tafsir) of Quran, Nahj Al-Balagha and Sahifa Al-Kamila (Sajjadia), Nuqoosh Al-Ismat.

Syed Zeeshan Haider Jawadi (17 September 1938 – 15 April 2000) was an Indian Islamic scholar, religious leader, public speaker, Qur'anic interpreter, Urdu poet, historian and philosopher of Shia Islam.

== Biography ==
Syed Zeeshan Haider Jawadi (also known as Allama Jawadi) was born in Allahabad on 17 September 1938 in town Karari, Dist. Allahabad (now Karari, Dist. Kaushambi, Uttar Pradesh, India.) . He started his primary education at Jamia Amjadia Karari, Allahabad and continued his Islamic education at Jamia Nazmia in Lucknow.

== Stay in Najaf al-Ashraf ==
Allama Jawadi moved to Najaf-e-Ashraf (Iraq) for higher studies, as Najaf was the best Islamic learning center of that time and he stayed under the patronage of his brother Maulana Syed Ali Abid Rizvi until 1961. He studied under the greats such as Abul Qasim al-Khoei and Muhammad Baqir al-Sadr up to Bahth Kharij (advanced) level. One of the famous scholars of Pakistan, Talib Jauhari was his contemporary in Najaf.

He was dean of the India Shi'ite elementary and theological schools, which numbered 40 in 1993.

He died at the age of 62 on 15 April 2000.

== Personal life ==
Jawadi's son, Ehsan Jawadi, a Shia scholar who regularly presented on the Win Islam TV channel, died in 2018.

== Works ==
- Anwar Al-Quran (Translation and Commentary on Quran)
- Women and Shari'at (Divine Law): Complete Rules Regarding Women, in Islam (1999)
- Nahj Al-Balagha (Translation and commentary)
- Al-Sahifa al-Sajjadiyya (Translation)
- Iqtisaduna (Translation)
- Al-Bank al-Ribawii al-Islam
- Imam Jafer Sadiq(as) aur mazahib e Arbaa (Urdu:امام جعفر صادقؑ اور مذایبِ اربعہ)
- Ahl Al-Bait - Quran aur Sunnat ki raushni mein (Translation)
- Nuqoosh e Ismat
- Life sketch of fourteen infallibles (English translation of Nuqoosh e Ismat)
- MiraturRashad (Translation of Wasiyatnama, Last Will & Testament By Ayatullah Shaikh Abdulla Mamkani)
- Karbala Shenasi (Compilation of Speeches given in London)
- Mehfil o Majalis
