= Jbaa =

Jbaa جباع
- Municipality
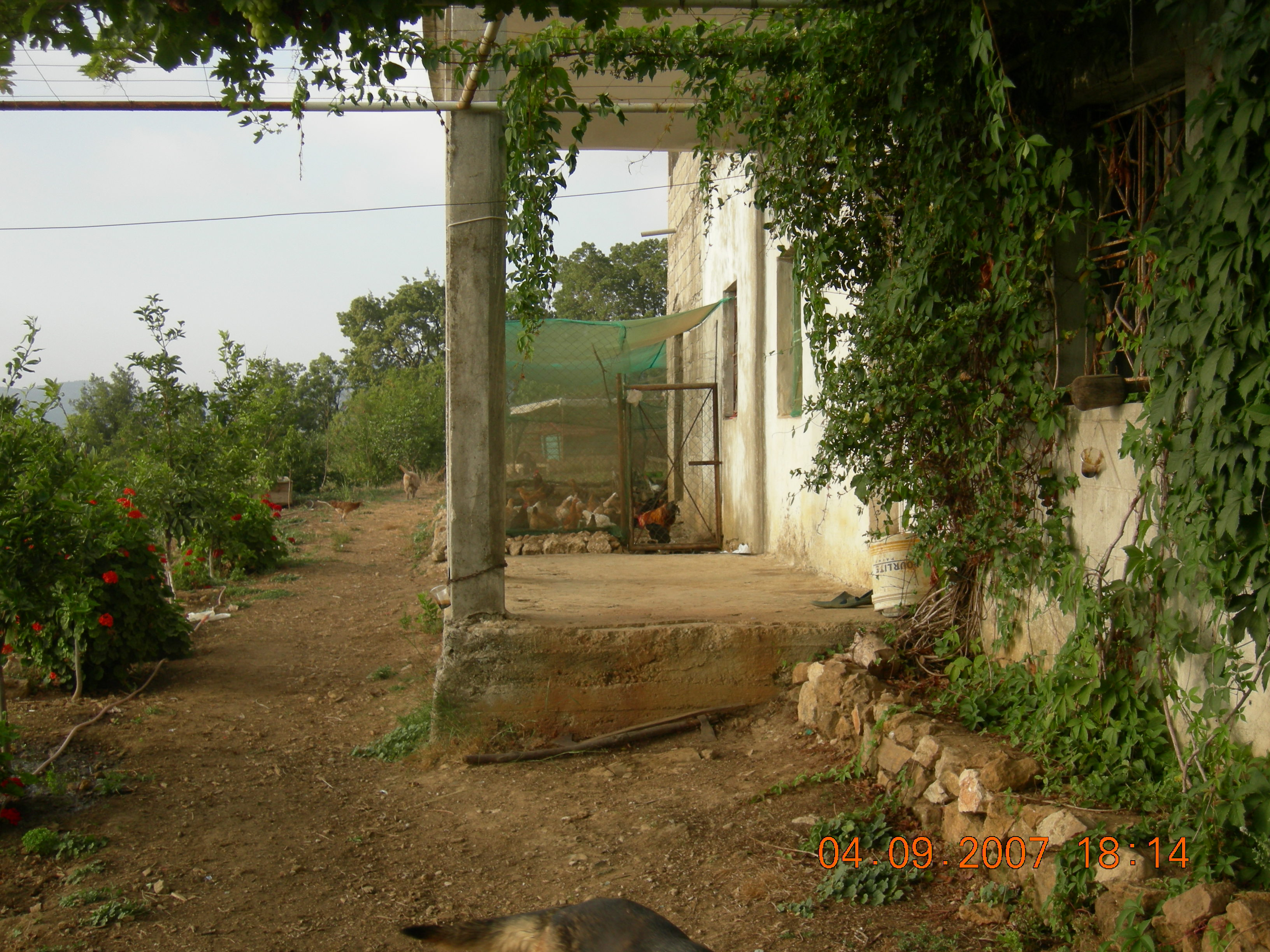
- Farmer House in Jbaa

- Location in Lebanon
- Coordinates: 33°29′N 35°31′E
- Grid position: 129/172 L
- Country: Lebanon
- Governorate: Nabatieh Governorate
- District: Nabatieh District
- Time zone: UTC+2 (EET)
  - Summer (DST): +3

Jbaa (Levantine Arabic: جباع, romanized: Jbāʿ; Syriac: ܓܒܐܥ; Phoenician: 𐤂𐤁𐤀𐤏), is a municipality in Lebanon located about 22 km (14 miles) from Sidon and 64 km (40 miles) from Beirut. It is part of the Nabatieh Governorate. Jbaa is situated on the great Safi Mountain, and rises over 770 metres (2,530 ft) (in the town center) from the sea level and then begins to rise to 900 metres (3,000 ft) in the district of "Ein-Elsataoun". The village covers over 3,000 acres (12 km^{2}). Surrounding the village is gorgeous greenery including diverse trees, especially walnut trees that spread around most of the town houses.

== Etymology ==
This town's name means “the mountain, the hill or highland” in the Aramaic language. The addition to its name of Al-Halaweh (the Arabic word for “the beautiful”) relates to its natural beauty.

== History ==
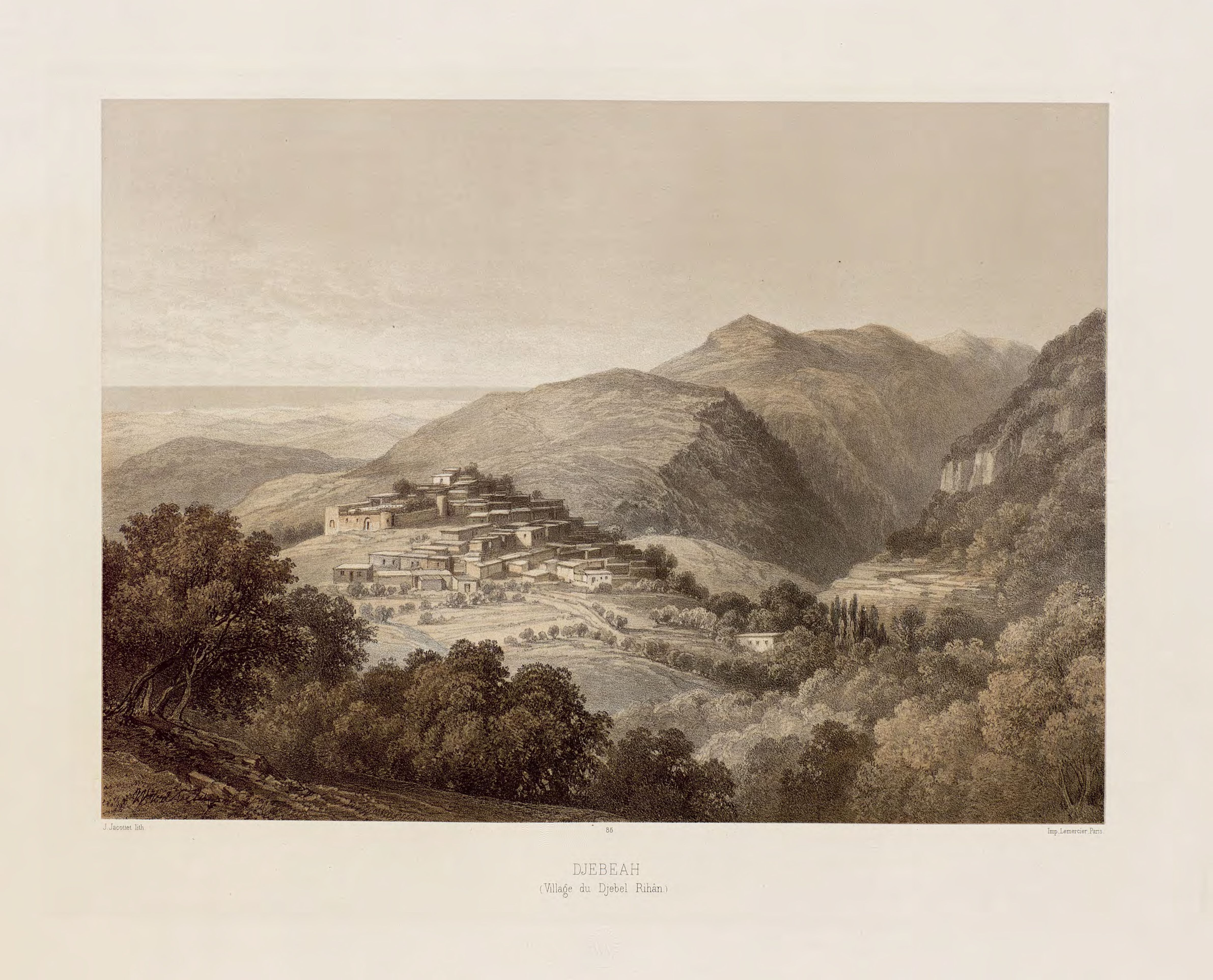
Jbaa, ca 1851, by van de Velde

Jbaa is the capital of Iqlim al-Tuffah, and was the Directorate of Independence during the French mandate over Lebanon. In the 20th century, it became known as a resort for the peoples of Nabatieh and Sidon and the rest of the Jabal Amel area. Jbaa has a number of restaurants and hotels because of its many natural springs: Ein-elteen, Marjah, Kabiy, Ein-Arkez, Hoelh-spring, spring-Abboud, Spring-Valley and Albsis.

Evidence shows that Jbaa has been continually inhabited since the times of the Phoenicians. During the Islamic period, the village was a center for the growth of Shia Islam. Scholars would come from all over to study religious doctrine in Jbaa. An important inhabitant at this time was Zayn al-Din al-Juba'i al-Amili, who was one of the greatest scholars in Shi'ism.

During the 1860 Mount Lebanon civil war, Jbaa became a safe haven for Christian refugees fleeing Druze aggression in Mount Lebanon. The notables of the village had offered protection to the fleeing Christians and granted asylum to those running from persecution.

In the year 1889 scientific, cultural, and social development enveloped Jbaa. The government established the Turkish primary school for males and another for females in the remnants of Almenakrh Castle, located in the center of Jbaa. In 1922 after the First World War, the golden age of education in the town begun with the establishment of a branch of the secondary school established by Hassan Kamel Al-Sabbah. Difficult times in the Nabatieh caused many students from surrounding area to come to Jbaa because of its safety, so the number of students reached 870 students. Then it became a secondary school in the year 1981/1982.

Jbaa was also famous for its festivals (mahrajanat), which were held in the summer and people gathered from all over Lebanon. There would be ongoing weddings and parties in Jbaa during the lasting peace in the 1960s and 1970s. Jbaa became a home and a haven for the people of Nabatieh caza at the beginning of the first Israeli war during the 1977/1982 period. The following Israeli war spread to the village and 80% of inhabitants moved to Sidon and Beirut in the year 1985.

After its liberation from the Israeli occupation in 1985, there was a renovation to most of the village which saw the revival of cafes and restaurants to have a prosperous summer season and revive the old days and times.

== Sites ==
Jbaa has a Roman cemetery south west of the town, used by Christians in the past. There are also still remains of an old Christian monastery in the central part of the town. There was also a mosque build by the Second Martyr, Zayn al-Din al-Juba'i al-Amili, which was later destroyed leaving nothing but a painting of the old history of restoration. A new mosque was built on the ashes of the old one in the modern town center.

Other sites include a fortress built by the rulers in the town, Almenakrh (currently the Jawad family), which was subsequently used as a Srai by the Turkish government, then as a school in the late nineteenth century (1889) . After that a modern primary school was built on the ashes in the year 1958, the remainder were used as the basis wall to the modern secondary School.

== Archaeology ==
A Neolithic archaeological site was discovered in Jbaa on the road to Nabatieh at around1,500 metres (4,900 ft) above sea level. The site is credited as having been discovered by Von Heidenstam although the material in the Archaeological Museum of the American University of Beirut is marked with name of "Hajji Khallaf" who may well have sold the pieces to Von Heidenstam. The majority of the flint tools found were Heavy Neolithic of the Qaraoun culture along with an example each of a later polished tipped axe, pick and adze that are thought to be entirely neolithic. Two other series from the site include two Lower Paleolithic bifaces and several Middle Paleolithic flints.

== Demographics ==
In 2014 Muslims made up 96.65% and Christians made up 2.88% of registered voters in Jbaa. 93.49% of the voters were Shiite Muslims. The Christian population is mostly Greek Catholics.

The population includes 10,000 inhabitants, families include.

Families include: Madi, Zein, Abou Haidar, Al-Horr, Atwi, Aquil, Awada, Barakat, Dhayne, Fawaz, Fayad, Ghamloush, Hammoud, Harb, Hneieno, Horchi, Hussein, Issa, Jameel, Jawed, Jezzini, Karaki, Khachfeh, Khafaja, Mahmoudy, al-Moussawi, Mohammad, Muhieddine, Mouallem, Nasser, Nehme, Noureddine, Raad, Ramadan, Saleh, Safawi, Takkieddine, Wehbe, Yassine, Badran, and more.

== Notable people ==
- Mohammad Raad (born 1955), politician of Hezbollah
