= The Logical Foundations of Induction =

Book by Muhammad Baqir al-Sadr

- Author: Muhammad Baqir al-Sadr
- Original title: الأسس المنطقية للاستقراء
- Language: Arabic
- Genre: Logic; Philosophy; Religion
- Published: 1972

The Logical Foundations of Induction (Arabic: الأسس المنطقية للاستقراء) is a philosophical book by the Shia jurisprudent and philosopher Sayyid Muhammad Baqir al-Sadr. The book is al-Sadr's attempt to deal with the problem of induction, and ultimately establish a common rational logical foundation and ground for the natural sciences, and faith in God. This is as indicated by the subtitle of the book: "A New Study of Induction That Aims to Discover the Common Logical Basis of the Natural Sciences and Faith in God" (Arabic: "دراسة جديدة للاستقراء تستهدف اكتشاف الأساس المنطقي المشترك للعلوم الطبيعية وللإيمان بالله"). The book is considered by scholars to be highly valuable, but also highly neglected and understudied at the same time.

== Background ==
Sayyid Muhammad Baqir al-Sadr (1934 – 1980) was an influential Iraqi Twelver Shia intellectual and cleric that is often regarded as one of the most brilliant Twelver Shia scholars in the twentieth century. In his twenties, al-Sadr witnessed the spread of communism and secularism in Iraq. Al-Sadr thus engaged with what he seems to have found as the major challenges to Islam in his era, namely Marxism and Western liberalism. This is what al-Sadr seems to have set himself to, as evident by his intellectual output that aimed to convey a modernized Islam, that is able to be an alternative to communism, and capitalism. His works include a trilogy of books, with the first being titled "Our philosophy" (Falsafatunā). It deals with Epistemology and defends rationalism and human knowledge. The second book, "Our economics" (Iqtiṣādunā) deals with Islamic economics as an alternative to capitalism. The third book, "Our society" (Mujtamaʿunā) was not published, and probably remains unfinished due to al-Sadr's imprisonment and execution. Al-Sadr also authored other works, including this work in Logic, entitled The Logical Foundations of Induction. This treatise seems to be al-Sadr's attempt to respond to the secular challenges of the natural sciences, for which God seems to be "a hypothesis they can do without", and that is by proving that there is nothing threatening in science to religion and its outlook to life. This is evident in the subtitle of the book: "A New Study of Induction That Aims to Discover the Common Logical Basis of the Natural Sciences and Faith in God".

Al-Sadr seems to have had two phases in his philosophical thought. At first, and as evident in his book "Our philosophy" (1959), al-Sadr supports the rationalist Aristotelian approach to knowledge. He later on criticized this approach, and advocated in his book "The logical Foundations of Induction" (1972) for a new approach to knowledge that he terms the subjectivist approach.

=== History ===
- In 1384 AH, al-Sadr gave the lectures in which he attempted to establish the "Subjectivist Logic" that will later on appear in his "The Logical Foundations of Induction" book.
- In 1385 AH, al-Sadr was in the process of studying and preparing for The Logical Foundations of Induction, a process which is narrated to have continued for 7 years. In this process, al-Sadr had to study Mathematics, and especially probability theory.
- The book was published and printed in 1391 AH (1972 AD).

== Overview ==
As indicated by its title, al-Sadr in this treatise is concerned with "the logical foundations of induction". Al-Sadr starts by contrasting induction with deduction, defining deduction as inference in which the conclusion is never more general than the premises. In contrast, induction is defined as inference in which we move from particular premises to general conclusions. Another way of contrasting deduction and induction is through the degree by which the premises warrant the conclusion. In deduction, the truth of the premises of an argument necessitates the truth of its conclusion. On the other hand, in induction, the truth of the premises renders the conclusion likely, rather than guarantee its truth. As such, and as al-Sadr puts it in his introduction, there is a "gap" in inductive reasoning. This is since while deductive reasoning is justified by the law of noncontradiction, induction lacks this justification. Al-Sadr aims in this book to close this "gap", and provide the missing justification for inductive reasoning. The book is divided into four sections. The first two sections are criticisms of previous attempts to solve the problem of induction, focusing on what al-Sadr calls the "rationalist Aristotelian" approach, and the empiricist approach. The third section forms the bulk of the book, and contains the foundations of al-Sadr's epistemological contribution. The fourth and final section investigates the epistemological results of the previous section, including that faith in God can be justified by the same means used in the natural sciences.

== Contents ==
=== Aristotle and induction ===
Al-Sadr starts his discussion of the Aristotelian approach (or what al-Sadr refers to as the "rationalist" approach) to induction by stating that logic differentiates between two types of induction, namely, perfect induction, and imperfect induction. In perfect induction, the general conclusion follows from the premises because all instances are enumerated in the premises. Perfect induction is simply then a valid deduction. In imperfect induction, by contrast, the general conclusion goes beyond the instances enumerated in the premises, and is what al-Sadr focuses on.

Al-Sadr lays down the Aristotelian approach to the justification of imperfect induction as being composed by three components: Firstly, the claim that nothing happens without a cause, which can be considered a version of the principle of sufficient reason. Secondly, the claim that repeated conjunction implies causality. Thirdly, the claim that causality implies regularity, i.e. that whenever a cause A that causes B occurs, then it will be followed by B. Aristotelian logic does not try to justify the first and third components, it instead deals with both as rational a priori principles. The second claim remains, and thus requires justification. Aristotelian logic justifies the second claim by basing it on another a priori principle; the claim that if a conjunction occurs either always or for the most part, then that conjunction is not a coincidence. By this, imperfect induction in Aristotelian logic, is a form of a deductive syllogism, and thus has justification. Yet, al-Sadr argues that the claim that if a conjunction always repeats or for the most part then it is not a coincidence is not an a priori principle; he considers it being justified by induction, and thus cannot be used to justify induction due to falling in circular reasoning. Al-Sadr sets down seven arguments that disprove that this claim is an a priori principle.

=== Empiricist accounts of induction ===
The empiricist approach is different from the rationalist approach in that it rejects any a priori principles. Al-Sadr categorizes the empiricist accounts of induction into three categories, the first being the account that it is possible to reach certainty by inductive reasoning, the second being the account that inductive reasoning makes its conclusion more or less probable but not to the level of certainty, and the third being the account that doubts the objective value of induction, and argues that its value stems merely from mental "custom and habit." The first and second accounts agree with the Aristotelian approach that induction relies on the principle that nothing happens without a cause, and the principle that causality implies regularity, but they differ with it in the justification of these principles. The first account takes an approach of circular reasoning in that these principles are justified by induction itself that they are used in justifying, while the second account says that these principles cannot be justified, and hence induction cannot lead to certainty. Al-Sadr deals mainly with the third account associated with David Hume, that could be called the psychological approach. He criticizes Hume's approach to causality, and his account of induction. After this revision of the empiricist approaches to induction, al-Sadr concludes that the empiricist approach fails to justify and account for induction.

=== Al-Sadr's account of induction: Subjectivism ===
After criticizing the rationalist and empiricist approaches to induction, al-Sadr lays down what he calls "a new direction in epistemology", which is his subjectivist approach. His approach agrees with the rationalist approach in that our knowledge is based on certain a priori principles, though it disagrees with it in the identification of these principles, and the ways our knowledge can grow. The latter part is further elaborated by al-Sadr in that our knowledge can grow in both objective, and subjective means, rather than only by objective means as the rationalist approach argues. This subjective growth requires a new sort of "subjective logic" to account for the conditions that make the subjective growth of knowledge rational.

Al-Sadr points out that the subjective growth of knowledge passes through two phases: the phase of objective growth in which knowledge starts as a mere probability that rises to high probabilities by objective means but not to the level of certainty, and the phase of subjective growth that rises with that high probability to the level of certainty. The phase of objective growth is based on the theory of probability, a version of which al-Sadr illustrates. The idea behind the objective growth is that by experiments and by using principles of probability, one can show that phenomenon A is the cause of another phenomenon B, and thus that it will always be followed by it in similar circumstances. In the phase of subjective growth, though, is where the bridge that closes the inductive "gap" is offered by al-Sadr.

==== The Phase of subjective growth ====
Al-Sadr differentiates between three types of certainty: logical certainty, subjective certainty, and objective certainty. Logical certainty is the certainty we have when we believe in something and know the impossibility of it being otherwise, given other knowledge we have. For example, if we know that p and q are given, it is impossible logically for not p to be true. Subjective certainty is the subjective psychological state that a person might have that a proposition is true beyond any doubt. Finally, objective certainty is the certainty that is based on the laws of probability, and is what al-Sadr refers to as the certainty that knowledge reaches in the subjective growth phase. Al-Sadr then presents an assumption that raises with the high probability of inductive reasoning in the objective growth phase to rational objective certainty: "Whenever the probability value of an alternative becomes overwhelmingly great, that value transforms—under specific conditions—into certainty." It is as if “human knowledge is designed in a manner that prevents it from preserving very small probability values; any small probability value simply dies away in favor of the large probability value on the other side; and this means: this [large probability] value transforms into certainty”.

=== Applications of the Subjectivist account ===
After laying down his view on induction, al-Sadr presents his proof for the existence of God, on inductive grounds. This ultimately aims to show that the certainty in the existence of God is based on the same principles that lead to certainty in the natural sciences, and that we either accept, or reject both of them.

== Reception and criticism ==
The book is considered by scholars to be a great achievement by al-Sadr. Scholars including Sayyid Abu al-Qasim al-Khoei, are narrated to have noted the book's depth and complexity. Other scholars including Zaki Naguib Mahmoud also found the book to be highly valuable and urged for it to be translated into English. Despite this importance, scholars regard the book to be highly neglected and understudied in Islamic seminaries and institutions.

The book, however, was not devoid of criticism. The assumption that al-Sadr provides to justify the subjective growth of knowledge, for example, was criticized by Saleh J. Agha as being merely a description of how human knowledge works, rather than what is the true real justification of inductive reasoning.

Murtadha Faraj states that al-Sadr in this book establishes a new inductive logic; what al-Sadr calls the "Subjectivist Logic" (Arabic: المنطق الذاتي). This new logic details the rules for al-Sadr "Subjectivist" account in Epistemology. Faraj provides a critique of al-Sadr's analysis of the workings of the human mind; he argues that al-Sadr identifies the objective rules that make inductive reasoning rational, but does not describe what actually happens in the human mind. Faraj bases his critique on several concepts in the philosophy of science, including the concept of tacit knowledge attributed to Michael Polanyi, and the Duhem–Quine thesis.
