= Iqtisaduna =

1962 book by Muḥammad Bāqir aṣ-Ṣadr

Iqtisaduna Our Economics
- Book cover
- Author: Mohammad Baqir Al-Sadr
- Language: English
- Genre: Non-fiction books about Islamic Economic
- Publisher: CreateSpace Independent Publishing Platform
- Publication date: 10 November 2014
- Publication place: Iraq
- Pages: 272
- ISBN: 1502722739

Our Economy (اقتصادنا, Iqtisaduna) is a foundational work on Islamic economics by Shia cleric Muhammad Baqir al-Sadr.

The book was written in Arabic between 1960 and 1961, and published in 1982. It was al-Sadr's main work on economics and one of his most significant works, and still forms much of the basis for modern Islamic banking. The first translation into English was done in 1982 by the Iranian government and after that the book was translated into German in 1984 by a young German orientalist. Muhammad Baqir Al-Sadr was born in Kadhimiyeh, Baghdad in 1935.

== Content ==
Our Economy must be seen as the first comprehensive analytic book on economics that is written from an Islamic viewpoint. Al-Sadr used legal hukm (rulings) to provide an economic philosophy. The book was translated into English by the Iranian government in 1982. Our Economy written under three headlines: Principles and methods, Distributions and the factors of production, and Distribution and justice. The book consist of three parts: the two first parts show that Islam has answers to problems of the modern world by presenting an Islamic alternative to both capitalism and socialism. In third part al-sadr explains the Islamic economy conception.

Al-Sadr book consist of Islamic economics theory which have differences with other theories. This theory presents practical solutions to economic problems in line with Islam's concept of justice. Islamic economics is a doctrine and justice has a critical role in this doctrine. Islamic economics includes 'every basic rule of economic life connected with its ideology of social justice'. This doctrine based on Islamic beliefs, laws, sentiments, concepts and definitions drives from the sources of Islam.

The first parts of Iqtisaduna discuss historical materialism such as Marxism, socialism, communism, and capitalism. Al-Sadr rejects socialism on the basis that Islam distinguishes between the individual and the ruler in an Islamic state in a manner that requires a distinction between private and public property. However, he also rejects capitalism's notion that private property is justified in its own right, arguing instead that both private and public property originate from God, and that the rights and obligations of both private individuals and rulers are therefore dictated by Islam. He also rejects the conclusion that this makes Islamic economics a mixture between capitalism and socialism, arguing that capitalism and socialism each come about as the natural conclusion of certain ideologies, while Islamic economics comes about as the natural conclusion of Islamic ideology and therefore is justified entirely independently of other systems of economics.

== Reception ==
Lawyer Chibli Mallat wrote his comment about Iqtisaduna, on FiveBooks as one of the top five on his subject. He said: "...Al-Sadr reshaped the whole field of Islamic law away from the monstrous idea of it, held by Eastern and Western ignoramuses alike. Iqtisaduna is the greatest illustration of Sadr's aggiornamento – bringing up to date – of classical Islamic law..."

Ermin Sinanović, the Director of Research and Academic Programs at the International Institute of Islamic Thought (IIIT), said: It is interesting to note that in Al-Sadr's Iqtisaduna was more dominant in the Arab academic and policy making circles at the time.

== See also ==
- History of Islamic economics
- Muhammad Baqir al-Sadr
- Islamic banking and finance
