= Five Martyrs of Shia Islam =

Shia scholars killed by Sunni regimes

The five Martyrs (Arabic: الشهداء الخمسة) were five scholars (ulama) of Shi'i Islam, living in different spans of history (from 1385 to 1980 CE), who were executed by their respective Sunni regimes. The Shia remember them by the term Five Martyrs. A leading work on the biographies of the martyrs was Shuhada-e Khamsa kay Halaat-e Zindagi ("Five Martyr's condition of life") by Grand Ayatollah Muhammad Hussain Najafi.

== Shahid al Awwal ==
Muhammad Jamaluddin al-Makki al-Amili al-Jizzini, (1334–1385) is known to Shias as the Shahid Awwal (Arabic: الشهيد الأول ash-Shahid al-Awwal "The First Martyr"). Although he is neither the first Muslim, nor the first Shi'te to die for his religion, he became known as "Shahid Awwal" because he was probably the first Shia scholar of such stature to have been killed in a brutal manner.

He was born in 734 A.H (ca. 1334 ) in Jabal 'Amel. He went to study at al-Hilla in Iraq when he was 16 and returned when he was 21. He used taqiyya to establish himself as a religious scholar and Sunni law to judge Sunnis, while covertly judging Shias using Shia law.

During the reign of Sultan Barquq he was accused of rafd, defamation of Aisha, Abu Bakr and Umar, he was also accused of preaching the Shia Ithna'ashari faith. A Maliki jurist gave the fatwa for his death. Subsequently, he was imprisoned for one year, then beheaded by sword. His body was then crucified and stoned in Damascus.

== Shahid al Thani ==
Zayn al-Din al-Juba'i al'Amili (1506–1558) was the Second Martyr, and the author of the first Sharh of Shahid Awwal's Al-Lum'ah ad-Dimashqiya (The Damascene Glitter) titled as Ar-Rawda al-Bahiyah fi Sharh al-Lum'ah ad-Dimashqiya (الروضة البهيّة في شرح اللمعة الدمشقيّة) (The Beautiful Garden in Interpreting the Damscene Glitter).

He was one of the greatest shi'a scholars. He studied under famous Sunni and Shi'a in Jabal 'Amel, Damascus, Cairo, Jerusalem among many others. He was known and respected by sunnis in Baalabeck for this. He was authorized to teach Muslims in the Nouriyah Islamic school according to the five schools of thought. He became a Mujtahid at age 33 after his visits to Iraq. Especially that shi'ism was still strong among the people as a result of the not-so-long gone Hamdanid dynasty, some people conspired against him due to petty reasons before being judged in front of the Sultan.

He was a widely travelled man, having visited Egypt, Syria, Hijaz, Tihamah, Baitul Muqaddas, Iraq and Constantinople (Istanbul). Always in pursuit of knowledge, he studied from nearly twelve Sunni Ulama of fiqh. Apart from the proficiency in fiqh, he was well versed in Usool, Philosophy, Irfan, Medicine and Astronomy. He was a man of piety, known for his austere way of life. His students have recorded in his biography that Shaheed maintained his family by selling the woods cut by himself during the nights, and then sat to teach during the day. While in Ba'lbak, he conducted classes in Fiqh according to five schools, i.e. Ja'fari, Hanafi, Shafei, Maliki and Hambali. His Sharh al-Lum'ah is a part of curriculum in almost every Hawza even today. He studied from Muhaqqiq Karaki before the later migrated to Iran.

In Rajab of 965 A.H. (1558), he was beheaded on his way to see the sultan and a shrine was built by some Turkmens on the site as they realised his stature. The person that beheaded him was killed by the Sultan orders.

== Shahid al Thalith ==
Qazi Noorullah Shustari (1542 AD-1610/11) is known as Shaheed-e-Salis (third martyr). He lived during the Mughal period. He was born in 956 AH at Shushtar, in present-day Khuzestan, Southern of Iran. He moved from Mashhad to India, on 1 Shawwal 992/6 October 1584 or 1587 AD. When Jahangir came to power his position within the court came under threat both from the enemies he had made while settling the disputes in Agra and Kashmir, and from Jahangir's own orthodox stance. Ultimately his own book Ahqaq-ul-haq was presented as evidence against him, he was declared a heretic and sentenced to death due to his religious beliefs. He was executed by flogging in Jumada II 1019/September 1610, when he was seventy. His tomb is at Agra

== Shahid al Rabi' ==
Mirza Muhammad Kamil Dehlavi was the Fourth Martyr and the author of Nuzhat-e-Isna Ashariya (نزھۃ اثنا عشريۃ). This book was a complete response to Shah Abdul Aziz Dehlavi's Tauhfa Ithna Ashari. It was due to this book that he was poisoned by the Ruler of Indian state of Jhajhar.

== Shahid al Khamis ==
Grand Ayatollah Sayyid Muḥammad Bāqir al-Ṣadr (March 1, 1935 – April 9, 1980) was an Iraqi Twelver Shi'a cleric, a philosopher, and ideological founder of Islamic Dawa Party born in al-Kazimiya, Iraq. He is the father-in-law of Muqtada al-Sadr and cousin of both Mohammad Sadeq al-Sadr and Imam Musa as-Sadr. His father Haydar al-Sadr was a well-respected high-ranking Shi'a cleric. His lineage goes back to Muhammad, through the seventh Shia Imam, Musa al-Kazim. (See Sadr family for more details.)
His father died in 1937, leaving the family penniless. In 1945 the family moved to the Shi'a holy city of Najaf, where al-Sadr would spend the rest of his life. Muhammad Baqir al-Sadr completed his religious teachings at religious seminaries under al-Khoei and Muhsin al-Hakim at the age of 25 and began teaching.
While teaching he became a prominent member of the Iraqi Shia community, and was noted for his many writings. His first works were detailed critiques of Marxism that presented early ideas of an alternative Islamic form of government. Perhaps his most important work was Iqtisaduna, one of the most important works on Islamic economics. This work was a critique of both socialism and capitalism. He was subsequently commissioned by the government of Kuwait to assess how that country's oil wealth could be managed in keeping with Islamic principles. This led to a major work on Islamic banking that still forms the basis for modern Islamic banks.
He also worked with Sayyid Mohammed Baqir al-Hakim in forming an Islamist movement in Iraq. This attracted the attention of the Baath Party, which resulted in numerous imprisonments for the Ayatollah. He was often subjugated to torture during his imprisonments, but continued his work after being released.
In 1977, he was sentenced to life in prison following uprisings in Najaf, but was released two years later due to his immense popularity. Upon his release however, he was put under house arrest. In 1980, after writing in the defense of the Islamic Revolution, Sadr was once again imprisoned, tortured, and executed by the regime of Saddam Hussein. His sister, Amina Sadr bint al-Huda, was also imprisoned, tortured, and executed. It has been alleged that Sadr was killed by having an iron nail hammered into his head and then being set on fire.
During the execution of Saddam Hussein, chants of "Long live Mohammed Baqir Sadr!" were heard being chanted by some of the Shi'a guards. CNN article

== See also ==
- Shahid Awwal
- Shahid Thani
- Shahid Salis
- Shahid Rabay
- Shahid Khamis
- Mohammad Baqir al-Hakim
