= List of Shia scholars of Islam =

Shia scholars of Islam include:

== Alive ==
- Hamedani, Hossein Noori (b. 1925)
- Jannati, Ahmad (b. 1927)
- Naser Makarem Shirazi (b. 1927)
- al-Sistani, Ali (b. 1930)
- al-Qazwini, Mortada (b. 1931)
- Ostadi, Reza (b. 1937)
- al-Haeri, Kazem (b. 1938)
- Najafi, Bashir (b. 1942)
- Shirazi, Sadiq (b. 1942)
- al-Tijani, Mohammad (b. 1943)
- Nateq-Nouri, Ali Akbar (b. 1944)
- al-Modarresi, Muhammad Taqi (b. 1945)
- Fallahian, Ali (b. 1945)
- Khoeiniha, Mohammad (b. 1945)
- Moezi, Abdolhossein (b. 1945)
- Syedna Mufaddal Saifuddin (b. 1946)
- al-Modarresi, Hadi (b. 1948)
- Rouhani, Hassan (b. 1948)
- Dorri-Najafabadi, Ghorbanali (b. 1950)
- Noori, Abdollah (b. 1950)
- Naqvi, Jawad (b. 1952)
- Ansari, Majid (b. 1954)
- Mousavi-Lari, Abdolvahed (b. 1954)
- Younesi, Ali (b. 1955)
- Araki, Mohsen (b. 1956)
- Mohseni-Ejehei, Gholam Hossein (b. 1956)
- Bagheri, Khosrow (b. 1957)
- Aga Syed Yousuf Kashmiri
- Aga Syed Mustafa
- Mulla Muhammad Muqim-al Bahreni-al Kashmiri ( ملا محمد مقيم البحريني الكشميري )
- Boroujerdi, Hossein Kazemeyni (b. 1958)
- Mohsen Kadivar (b. 1959)
- Abtahi, Mohammad Ali (b. 1960)
- Khatami, Ahmad (b. 1960)
- Mostafa Pour-Mohammadi (b. 1960)
- Nassab, Reza Hosseini (b. 1960)
- Yaqubi, Mohammad (b. 1960)
- Leghaei, Mansour (b. 1962)
- al-Gharavi, Aqeel (b. 1964)
- Salman, Ali (b. 1965)
- Naqvi, Ali Naqi (b. 1970)
- Hasan, Hamidul
- Masoumi-Tehrani, Abdol-Hamid
- al-Saghir, Jalal al-Din Ali

== Deceased ==
=== 7th century ===
- Sulaym ibn Qays al-Hilālī al-ʿĀmirī (died c.695)
- Sa'īd b. Jubayr b. Hishām al-Asadī al-Wālibī (665–714)
- Asim b. Bahdala Abi l-Najud al-Asadi al-Kufi (b. between 661 and 680, died 744–746)
- Abān b. Abī ʿAyyāsh (Fīrūz) al-Baṣrī al-Tābiʿī, known as Aban b. Abi 'Ayyash (died 746–757)
- Abū Saʿīd Abān b. Rubāḥ al-Bakrī al-Jurayrī al-Kindī al-Rabaʿī al-Kūfī, known as Aban b. Taghlib (died c.758)
- Sulayman b. Mihran al-A'mash al-Kufi, known as A'mash Kufi (680-c.765)
- Zurāra b. Aʿyan b. Sunsun al-Shaybānī al-Kūfī, known as Zurara b. A'yan (c.690 - c.767)
- Maʿrūf b. Kharrabūdh (b. in the second half of the seventh century)
- Al-Fudayl b. Yasar al-Nahdi al-Basri, known as Al-Nahdi (b. in the late seventh century)

=== 8th century ===
- Abu Mikhnaf (died 774)
- Burayd b. Muʿāwiya al-ʿIjlī (died before 765)
- al-Thumali, Abu Hamzah (d. 767)
- Yahya b. Abi l-Qasim al-Asadi, known as Abu Basir al-Asadi (died 767)
- Muḥammad b. Muslim al-Thaqafī al-Kūfī (died 767)
- Abū Mūsā Jābir ibn Hayyān (c.721 – c.815)
- Yunus b. 'Abd al-Rahman (723–819)
- Ṣafwān b. Yaḥyā al-Bajalī (died 825)
- Abū Aḥmad Muḥammad b. Abī ʿUmayr b. Zīyad b. ʿĪsā al-Azdī (died 832)
- Ahmad b. Muhammad b. Abi Nasr al-Bazanti (769–836)
- Hasan b. Mahbub (766–839)
- Al-Ḥasan b. ʿAlī b. Faḍḍāl al-Taymulī al-Kūfī (died 839)
- Al-Sayyid ʿAbd al-ʿAẓīm al-Ḥasanī, known as Sayyid al-Karīm and Shah ʿAbd al-ʿAzīm (789–866)
- ʿAlī b. Mahziyār al-Ahwāzī al-Dawraqī (b. in the middle of the 8th century)
- Faddala b. Ayyub al-Azdi al-Ahwazi (b. in the middle of the 8th century)

=== 9th century ===
- Abu 'Ali Hasan b. 'Arafa al-'Abdi al-Baghdadi (died 870)
- Abū Muḥammad Faḍl b. Shādhān b. Khalīl al-Azdī al-Nīshābūrī (died 873)
- Al-Kindi (died 873)
- Abū Isḥāq Ibrāhīm b. Mahzīyār al-Ahwāzī (c.811 - c.879)
- Abu Ja'far Muhammad b. 'Abd al-Malik al-Daqiqi al-Wasiti (died 879)
- Ahmad b. Muhammad b. Isa al-Ash'ari (died c. 890)
- Abu Hatam Muhammad b. Idris al-Razi (died 890)
- Ahmad b. Muhammad b. Khalid al-Barqi (c.815 - c.887/894)
- Ya'qubi (died 898)
- Ahmad ibn A'tham (died 926)
- Qummi, Ali ibn Babwayh (died c.940)
- al-Kulayni, Muhammad ibn Ya‘qub (864–941)
- Al-Farabi (c.872-950)
- Muhammad b. 'Umar al-Kashshi (died c. 951)
- Muhammad b. al-Hasan b. Ahmad, known as Ibn al-Walid al-Qummi (c.883-954)
- Al-Masudi (c. 896–956)
- Muhammad b. Yahya al-'Attar al-Qummi (lived late of ninth century until the half of the tenth century)
- Ali b. Ibrahim al-Qummi (lived during the second half of the ninth and beginning of tenth centuries)
- Abdullah ibn Ja'far al-Himyari (lived in 9th century)
- Sa'd b. 'Abd Allah al-Ash'ari al-Qummi (lived in 9th century)
- Husayn b. Sa'id al-Ahwazi (b. before 817–868)

=== 10th century ===
- Abu Muhammad Harun b. Musa b. Ahmad al-Talla'ukbari (b. c.900)
- Ibn Qulawayh (died c. 979)
- Ibn Babwayh (Shaykh al-Saduq) (923–991)
- Ibn al-Nadim (died c. 995)
- Al-Sharif al-Radi (970–1015)
- Muhammad al-Baghdadi (Shaykh al-Mufid) (948–1022)
- Ahmad b. 'Abd al-Wahid b. Ahmad, known as Ibn Hashir (d.1032)
- Abu Noaym Ahámad b. Abdallah Esfahani (d. 1038 AD)
- Sharif al-Murtaza (965–1044)
- Ahmad ibn Ali al-Najashi (982–1058)
- Tusi, Abu Ja‘far (995–1067)
- Ibn Jonayd Eskafi (b. 902)
- Muhammad b. Mas'ud al-'Ayyashi Sullami Samarqandi (lived in 10th century)

=== 11th century ===
- Aḥmad Ibn ʿAyyāsh al-Jawharī (d. 1010)
- Muḥammad al-Sharīf al-Raḍī, (al-Sayyid al-Raḍī) (d. 1015)
- Muḥammad al-Qummī (Ibn Shādhān) (d. 1029)
- al-Tabarsi, Fadhl ibn Hasan (1093–1153)
- Ashub, Ibn Shahr (1095–1192)
- Abu al-Futuh al-Razi (b. 1077)

=== 12th century ===
- Abū al-Wafā Abd al-Jabbār al-Rāzī (d. 1110)
- Abū al-Ḥasan Alī al-Fanjkirdī al-Nayshābūrī (d. 1119)
- Abū ʿAlī al-Ḥasan al-Ṭūsī (d. 1121)
- Abū Manṣūr Aḥmad al-Ṭabrisī (author of al-Iḥtijāj) (d. 1192)
- Sayyed Ibn Tawus (1193–1266)

=== 13th century ===
- Tusi, Nasir al-Din (1201–1274)
- Muhaqqiq al-Hilli (c.1205–1277)
- al-Bahrani, Maytham (1238–1299)
- al-Hilli, Jamal al-Din Hasan (Allamah) (1250–1325)

=== 14th century ===
- Khalīfa al-Māzandarānī (d. 1335)
- Amīd al-Dīn al-A'rajī (d. 1353)
- Naṣīr al-Dīn al-Kāshī (d. 1354)
- Muḥammad al-Ḥillī (Fakhr al-Muḥaqqiqīn) (d. 1369)

=== 15th century ===
- Izz al-Dīn Abū Muḥammad al-Ḥasan al-Āmilī (d. 1399)
- Ḥāfiẓ Rajab Bursī (d. 1410)
- Jamāl al-Dīn al-Baḥrānī (Ibn al-Mutawwaj) (d. 1416)
- Zayn al-Dīn Abū Muḥammad Alī (Ṣāḥib al-Ṣirāṭ al-mustaqīm) (d. 1472)

=== 16th century ===
- Asterabadi, Muhammad Baqir (Mir Damad) (d. 1631)
- Shirazi, Sadr al-Din Muhammad (Mullah Sadra) (1571–1640)
- al-Majlisi, Muhammad Taqi (Al-Majlisi al-Awwal) (1594–1660)

=== 17th century ===
- al-Majlisi, Muhammad Baqir (Allamah) (1616–1689)
- al-Āmili, Hur (1624–1693)
- al-Jaza'iri, Ni'matullah (1640–1700)
- al-Samahiji, Abdullah (1675–1723)
- al-Haeri, Nasrallah (1696–1746)
- al-Bahrani, Yusuf (1695–1772)

=== 18th century ===
- Behbahani, Muhammad Baqir (1706–1792)

=== 19th century ===
- al-Ansari, Murtada (d. 1864)
- Musavi, Hamid Husayn (1830 - 1880)
- Shirazi, Abdullah (1892–1984)
- Tabrizi, Mir-Fatah-Agha (??-1892)
- Shirazi, Mirza Hasan (1814–1896)
- Khorasani, Muhammad Kazim (1839–1911)
- al-Sadr, Ismail (??-1920)
- al-Sadr, Haydar (1891–1937)
- Modarres, Hasan (1870–1937)
- Yazdi, Abdul Karim Haeri (1859–1937)
- Hasan, Najmul (1863–1938)
- Esfahani, Muhammad Hossein Qaravi (1879–1942)
- Roshdieh, Hasan (1851–1944)
- Yusuf Ali, Abdullah (1872–1953)
- Kashani, Abul Qasim (1884–1961)
- Borujerdi, Husayn (1875–1962)
- al-Hakim, Muhsin (1889–1970)
- Shirazi, Sultanu'l-Wa'izin (1894–1971)
- Yazdi, Mahdi Puya (1899–1973)
- Tabatabaei, Muhammad Husayn (1892–1981)
- Naqvi, Najafi, Syed Safdar Hussain (1932–1989)
- al-Khoei, Abul Qasim (1899–1992)
- Golpaygani, Muhammad Reza (1898–1993)
- Araki, Muhammad Ali (1895–1994)
- Arbab, Rahim (1874-??)
- ibn Salih, Sadr al-Din (1848-??)

=== 20th century ===
- al-Sadr, Sadr al-Din (1882–1954)
- Rizvi, Ahmad (1901–1964)
- Rizvi, Mohsin Nawab (1911–1969)
- Amini, Abdul Hosein (1902–1970)
- Turabi, Allamah Rasheed (1908–1973)
- al-Sadr, Musa (1929–1978)
- Taleghani, Mahmoud (1911–1979)
- Motahhari, Morteza (1920–1979)
- al-Sadr, Muhammad Baqir (1935–1980)
- Beheshti, Muhammad (1928–1981)
- Bahonar, Muhammad Javad (1933–1981)
- Shariatmadari, Kazem (1904–1985)
- Naqvi, Kalbe Abid (1923–1986)
- Al Shami, Hussian Hadi (1920–2008)
- Naqvi, Ali Naqi (1905–1988)
- Khomeini, Ruhullah (1900–1989)
- al-Musawi, Abbas (1952–1992)
- Naqvi, Aqa Hasan (1935–1996)
- al-Sadr, Muhammad Muhammad Sadiq (1943–1999)
- Jawadi, Syed Zeeshan Haider (1938–2000)
- Shamseddine, Muhammad Mehdi (1936–2001)
- Shirazi, Muhammad (1928–2001)
- Rizvi, Sa'id Akhtar (1927–2002)
- Rizvi, Syed Ali Akhtar (1948–2002)
- Khalkhali, Sadegh (1927–2003)
- al-Hakim, Muhammad Baqir (1939–2003)
- al-Khoei, Abdul Majid (1962–2003)
- al-Waeli, Ahmed (1928–2003)
- Abaee-Khurasani, Muhammad Va'ez (1940–2004)
- al-Jamri, Abdul Amir (1937–2006)
- Ansari, Mustafa Hussain (1945–2006)
- Tabrizi, Mirza Javad (1926–2006)
- 'Askari, Murtada Sharif (1914–2007)
- Lankarani, Muhammad Fazel (1931–2007)
- Tavassoli, Mohammad Reza (1931–2008)
- al-Hakim, Abdul Aziz (1952–2009)
- Foumani, Muhammad Taghi Bahjat (1913–2009)
- Montazeri, Hossein-Ali (1922–2009)
- Fadhlullah, Muhammad Husayn (1935–2010)
- Zanjani, Abbasali Amid (1937–2011)
- Rezvani, Gholamreza (1922–2013)
- Burhanuddin, Mohammed (1915–2014)
- Mahdavi Kani, Mohammad Reza (1931–2014)
- Bahr al-Ulloum, Mohammad (1923–2015)
- Ardebili, Abdul Karim Mousavi (1926–2016)
- Tabasi, Abbas Vaez (1935–2016)
- Aliari, Javad Gharavi (1935–2018)
- Jafri, Husain Mohammad (1923–2019)
- Kabuli, Qurban Ali (1928–2019)
- Shahroudi, Mohammad (1925–2019)
- Najafabadi Ibrahim Amini (1925–2020)
- Sadiq, Kalbe (1939–2020)
- Sanei, Yousef (1937–2020)
- Taskhiri, Mohammad-Ali (1944–2020)
- Yazdi, Mohammad (1931–2020)
- al-Hakim, Mohammad Saeed (1936–2021)
- Mesbah Yazdi, Mohammad Taghi (1934–2021)
- Mohtashami-Pur, Ali Akbar (1947–2021)
- Naqvi, Kalbe Husayn
- Golpaygani, Lotfollah Safi (1919–2022)
- Reyshahri, Mohammad (1946–2022)
- Rohani, Sadeq (1926–2022)
- Sane'i, Hassan (1934–2023)
- Najafi, Mohammad Hussain (1932–2023)
- Emami, Mohammad (1931–2024)
- al-Kourani, Ali (1944–2024)
- Shooshtari, Mohammad Ismaeil (1949–2024)
- Khamenei, Ali (1939–2026)
- Jannaati, Mohammad Ebrahim (1933–2026)
- al-Fayyad, Mohammad Ishaq (1930–2026)
- Mousa Shubairi Zanjani (1927–2026)
- Khorasani, Hossein Vahid (1921–2026)

== See also ==
- Lists of maraji
- List of ayatollahs
- List of hujjatul Islams
