= Sadr al-Din bin Saleh =

Lebanese Grand Ayatollah

Grand Ayatollah Sadr al-Din bin Saleh (Arabic: صدر الدين ابن صالح) (1779–1848) was a Lebanese Twelver Shi'a religious scholar belonging to Sharefeddine and Noureddine families of Lebanese Shia Society.

== The as-Sadr Family ==
Sadr ed-Deen is also the patriarch of the Sadr family, a branch of Sharafeddine (Arabic: شرف الدين) family from Jabal Amel in Lebanon. The Sharafeddine family itself is a branch of the Nour eddine family, which traces its lineage to Musa al-Kazim (the seventh Shi'a Imam. The as-Sadr family has produced numerous Islamic scholars in Iran, Lebanon, and Iraq, including his son Ismail as-Sadr (died 1919/1920) and his grandsons Musa as-Sadr (disappeared in Libya in 1978) and Mohammad Baqir as-Sadr (died 1980).

== See also ==
- Ismail al-Sadr
- Haydar al-Sadr
- Sadr al-Din al-Sadr
- Musa al-Sadr
- Muhammad Baqir al-Sadr
- Muhammad Sadiq al-Sadr
- Muhammad Muhammad Sadiq al-Sadr
- Muqtada al-Sadr
- List of Shi'a Muslim scholars of Islam
