= Husayn al-Sadr =

Iraqi Grand Ayatollah

Grand Ayatollah Sayyid Husayn Ismail al-Sadr
- حسين اسماعيل الصدر
- Title: Grand Ayatollah

Personal life
- Born: 1952 (age 73–74) Baghdad, Kingdom of Iraq
- Website: www.husseinalsader.org

Religious life
- Religion: Islam
- Denomination: Shia

Husayn al-Sadr (Arabic: حسين الصدر), is an Iraqi Grand Ayatollah who is widely seen as a highly respected and unifying figure that has been called upon to reach across Iraq's ethno-sectarian divides. A Sayyid, he traces his lineage to the Islamic prophet Muhammad, through the seventh Shia Imam, Musa al-Kadhim. He is a native of, and is currently residing in Kadhimiya, Baghdad.

He is the great-grandson of Ismail al-Sadr through his son Haydar al-Sadr, the latter of whom is also the father of Muhammad Baqir al-Sadr.

== Early life ==
Husayn Ismail Haydar Ismail al-Sadr was born in Kadhimiya, Iraq, to a family of notable religious scholars. He spent his early years being schooled by his father, the prominent scholar Ismail Al-Sadr (son of Haydar al-Sadr) in the studies of Arabic language, and Quranic interpretation while simultaneously pursuing more conventional primary and secondary schooling. Upon completing these, Al-Sadr enrolled in the prestigious College of Jurisprudence in Najaf, where he was taught by his iconic uncle Ayatollah Mohammad Baqir al-Sadr.

=== Persecution ===
Following the assassination of his uncle Mohammad Baqir al-Sadr by the Ba’athist regime in 1980, Husayn Al-Sadr was subject to constant harassment at the hands of the Iraqi security forces. Having suffered horrendous torture and a prolonged house arrest because of his association with his uncle, despite he himself being a politically passive figure. It is thought that the Ayatollah was arrested 18 times, often being “hung by his feet for hours from a fan-like construction that continuously rotated”. The injuries sustained during these lengthy detainments have left the Ayatollah with ailments he suffers from to this day.

== Philanthropy ==
Many of Ayatollah Husayn al-Sadr's recent efforts have been directed at philanthropic projects. Having already established an impressive orphanage in his hometown of Kadhimiya, the Ayatollah has since directed his attention to a wide-ranging list of development programmes. Starting with a network of cultural and vocational training centres named after his late uncle and teacher Ayatollah Mohammed Baqir al-Sadr, the Ayatollah then established a similar network of centres aimed at empowering Iraqi women, whose position in society had declined a great deal in the sanctions years. Al-Sadr's portfolio of projects now includes dozens of schools, community health clinics and training centres that seek to operate at the most fundamental, grass-roots of Iraqi society.

=== The Baghdad Religious Accords ===
The issue of reconciliation and dialogue between Iraq's different religious and ethnic communities has featured heavily in the Ayatollah's recent efforts. On the 24th of February 2004, he hosted the Baghdad Religious Accord with Canon Andrew White, "The Vicar of Baghdad", an agreement reached between 39 representatives of Iraq's different communities, efforts representing “the first time in the country’s history [that] Iraq’s leaders had agreed to work together”. The Accord led to the establishment of the Iraq Centre for Dialogue, Reconciliation and Peace (ICDRP). Chaired initially by Dr. Mowaffak Al-Rubaie, the Centre sought to address six key issues it saw as being vitally important for Iraq's long-term progress:

Women, religion and democracy Youth and young people The media Religious freedoms and human rights Inter-religious dialogue Conflict prevention and resolution.

==== The Accord ====
In the name of God who is Almighty, Merciful and Compassionate, We who have gathered as clerics, intellectuals and political leaders representing all religions and doctrines pray and appeal for the peace of Iraq and declare our commitment to doing all in our power to ensure the ending of all acts of violence and bloodshed that deny the right to life, freedom and dignity. ‘We have dignified humankind’ (The Holy Quran)

According to our faith traditions, killing innocents in the name of God is a desecration of the laws of heaven and defames religion not only in Iraq but in the world. We also declare to the world at large that:

The acts of corruption, violence and destruction are the work of the Devil that must be rejected by all as we seek together to rebuild our nation. We, as Iraqis from different traditions, have decided to endeavour to live together as one family, respecting the moral and religious integrity of every individual, and we call upon all to condemn and renounce the culture of incitement, hatred and defamation of the other. The land of Iraq is holy in all scriptures. Therefore it is the duty for the followers of all divine religions to respect the sanctity of our land, whose good soul must not be desecrated by bloodshed. The sanctity of all our places of worship and religious sites must be protected and preserved by all. The freedom of religious worship and expression must be guaranteed by all. “There is no coercion in religions” (The holy Quran). We call on the political leaders in Iraq to work for a just, fair and peaceful transfer to democracy, inspired by the divinely inspired commandments of messengers and prophets. We call on and urge the international community in the name of religion to assist us in the reconstruction of Iraq away from violence and chaos. We shall endeavour to establish a process of truth, openness and reconciliation which will enable the spiritual, political, social and physical reconstruction of Iraq. We shall devote ourselves to continue our joint efforts for the unity of the people of Iraq and for the creation of a climate of togetherness in which our present and future generations may live with mutual trust and respect. We shall also educate our present and future generations accordingly to maintain this commitment. We, as clerics and intellectuals, ask those involved in politics and government not to slide down the slippery slope of sectarian politics, which has resulted in our present unstable situation; the absence of a nationhood and the importation of alternative culture. Good governance should be based on citizenship and competence within a system of rights and obligations, irrespective of national, religious or racial affiliation.

We hereby announce the founding of the Iraqi Centre for Dialogue, Reconciliation and Peace (ICDRP), whose membership will be drawn from the people of Iraq and which will take a lead to ensure that the tenets of this accord are continuously implemented.

=== The Humanitarian Dialogue Foundation ===
The Humanitarian Dialogue Foundation was founded in early 2007, at the peak of Iraq's sectarian strife which had engulfed all facets of daily life. In this context of hardship, suffering, violence and need, the Foundation represented Ayatollah Husayn Ismail al-Sadr's efforts to respond to the plight of ordinary Iraqis, "irrespective of religious creed or confessional identities and promote understanding amongst the nation’s components".

The Foundation was established following the “People of Iraq Conference”, which took place in Baghdad in May 2006 as a response to the spiralling sectarian bloodshed that was tearing up Iraq's communities. The Humanitarian Dialogue Foundation sought to embody the key tenets of understanding and peaceful coexistence that the conference concluded with, including:

The sincere call for the unity of Iraqis, starting a new page of tolerance and respect between all Iraqi sects and ethnicities without any marginalisation or prejudice; The rejection all forms of sectarianism and extremism. Iraqis should work together with a unified spirit; The belief that Iraq comes before any other religious, ethnic, confessional or political consideration; The importance of true national reconciliation.

The Humanitarian Dialogue Foundation seeks to create conditions conducive to the development of Iraq’s emerging civil society, which has endured decades of authoritarian rule, war and international sanctions.

The Foundation’s activities in Iraq have primarily focused on fostering an environment for reconciliation, with the aim of alleviating the suffering, poverty and distress experienced by Iraqis. It has also worked to build and maintain social cohesion and trust both within and between communities. This objective is particularly important in the prevailing climate of cynicism, fear and distrust that has affected Iraqi society and become a significant obstacle to future peace and prosperity.

The Humanitarian Dialogue Foundation has expanded its projects internationally, including a cultural centre it opened in London in 2010, with further centres planned in other cities. The Foundation states that its aim is to present aspects of Iraqi culture and heritage alongside more widely reported representations of the country's recent history. Its programming includes seminars, film screenings, conferences, and exhibitions.

=== The Coventry International Prize for Peace and Reconciliation ===
In 2003, Ayatollah's relentless efforts to foster peace and reconciliation in Iraq led to him being awarded the Coventry International Prize for Peace and Reconciliation. The prestigious award, whose past recipients include former UN humanitarian co-ordinator Hans von Sponeck and Nigerian President Olusegun Obasanjo.
