= Ismail as-Sadr =

Lebanese Grand Ayatollah

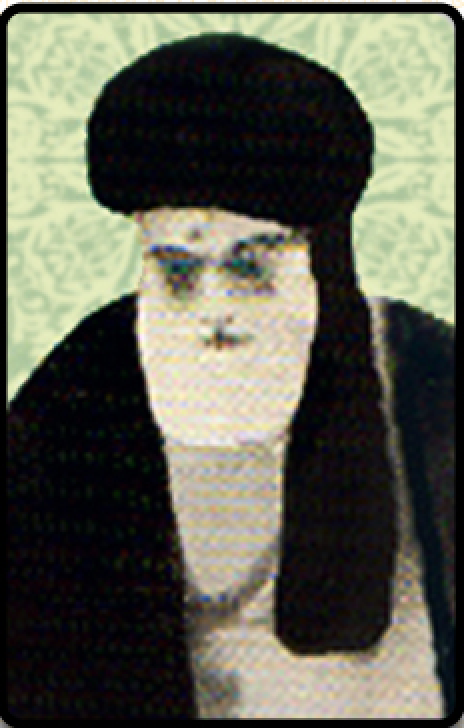
Ismail as-Sadr

Ismail as-Sadr (Arabic: اسماعيل الصدر) (born 1842 – died 1919–1920) was a Lebanese Grand Ayatollah, a title which is used in Iran, Lebanon and Iraq referring to a Twelver Shi'a scholar who is a fully qualified mujtahid who asserts authority over peers and followers by virtue of sufficient study and achievement of the level of necessary competency needed to obtain permission (ijāza) to practice ijtihad. He was born in Isfahan, Iran.

== Life and family ==
Sayyid Ismail as-Sadr is the grandfather of the Sadr family. He is the first to be known with the last name of as-Sadr after his father Sadr ad-Din ibn Salih, whose ancestors had been from the Jabal Amel in Lebanon.

Ismail As-Sadr was born in Isfahan, Iran. He was the youngest of five brothers all of whom became scholars of Shia Islam. He had four sons:

- Muhammad Mahdi as-Sadr (1879–1939), grandfather of Mohammad al-Sadr (killed 1999), great-grandfather of Muqtada as-Sadr
- Sadr ad-Din as-Sadr (1881–1954), father of Musa as-Sadr (disappeared in 1978) and Rabab al-Sadr
- Haydar as-Sadr (1891–1937), father of Muhammad Baqir as-Sadr and Amina al-Sadr (both killed in 1980)
- a fourth son.

He resided in Najaf, Iraq, and became the sole marja until his death in 1338 A.H. (c. 1919–1920).

== See also ==
- List of Shi'a Muslim scholars of Islam
