= Lebanon–Libya relations =

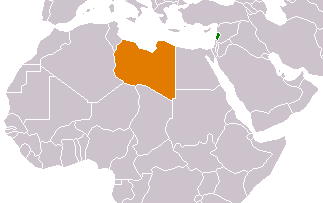

- Lebanon: Libya

Lebanon–Libya relations are the diplomatic relations between Lebanon and Libya. Both sovereign states are members of the Arab League, the Organisation of Islamic Cooperation, and the Non-Aligned Movement. Libya has an embassy in Beirut and Lebanon has an embassy in Tripoli. Relations between the two countries have been tense, particularly with the Lebanese Shia Amal Movement due to the kidnapping of imam Musa al-Sadr in Libya in 1978 during the leadership of Muammar Gaddafi.

== History ==
=== Libya under the rule of Muammar Gaddafi ===
Ever since Muammar Gaddafi took power in Libya in a coup d'état in 1969, the new leader offered financial and material support to Palestinian guerrilla groups in Lebanon. During the Lebanese Civil War, the Libyan government under Gaddafi sent "tens of millions of dollars" in 1975 to leftist Lebanese Sunni movements associated with the Pan-Arabist Lebanese National Movement fighting Maronite forces. Reportedly, Libya spent up to $100 million in Lebanon in 1975. Consequently, Libya became the principal outside source of funds for six or more Lebanese Muslim fighting groups, according to the United States Department of State. A Washington official reported that Libya was clearly the largest outside power involved in Lebanon and that "The Iraqis are there and the Syrians too, as they have been for a long time". "The Soviets have always been involved in Lebanon. But there are no signs of an increase of their influence in Lebanon. Only of the Libyans". On 21 June 1976, about 500 Libyan and 500 Syrian troops arrived in the airport of Beirut from Damascus as Arab League peacekeeping forces to enforce a ceasefire in Lebanon amidst the civil war.

On 25 August 1978, Lebanese Shia imam and leader of the Amal Movement, Musa al-Sadr, departed for Tripoli, Libya to meet with government officials at the invitation of Libyan leader Muammar Gaddafi. They were last seen on 31 August 1978. It is widely believed by Lebanese Shia Muslims that Gaddafi ordered al-Sadr's killing, although Libya had always denied responsibility and claimed that al-Sadr departed Libya for Rome, Italy. This led to tensions between the two nations, as Lebanese Parliament Speaker Nabih Berri claimed that the Libyan regime, and particularly the Libyan leader, was responsible for the disappearance of Imam Musa al-Sadr.

=== Post-Gaddafi regime ===
During the 2011 Libyan Civil War, Lebanon introduced a resolution, supported by the United Kingdom and France, calling for the establishment of a no-fly zone over Libya. Nawaf Salam, the Lebanese ambassador, stated to reporters that "Measures ought to be taken to stop the violence, to put an end to the situation in Libya, to protect the civilians there." After the killing of Muammar Gaddafi and overthrow of his government in October 2011, an official Lebanese delegation headed to Tripoli to investigate the truth behind Musa al-Sadr's disappearance in Libya in 1978. However, little progress was made because Libya's new interim government was overwhelmed with new challenges.

On 11 December 2015, Muammar Gaddafi's son, Hannibal Gaddafi, was kidnapped and held in Lebanon by an armed group demanding information about disappearance of Shiite Imam Musa al-Sadr, Sheikh Muhammad Yaacoub, and journalist Abbas Badreddine, The Lebanese judiciary issued a decision on 16 July banning Hannibal Gaddafi from leaving Lebanon for one year over investigations into allegations involving "forming gangs, abduction, and attempted murder". Hannibal Gaddafi reportedly went on a hunger strike in June 2023 to protest against his prolonged detention in Lebanon.

Libya boycotted the 2019 Arab League summit in Beirut after supporters of the Lebanese Shia Amal Movement tore down the Libyan flag among the various flags hoisted on poles lining the road to the airport to greet the delegations attending the summit, and replaced it with the Amal flag to protest the kidnapping of imam Musa al-Sadr in Libya. Regarding the incident, Lebanese ambassador Mohammad Sukaina stated “Lebanon is convinced that what happened in Beirut and Tripoli is neither directed against the people of Libya nor against the Lebanese people”.

The Lebanese committee tasked with investigating the disappearance of Imam Moussa al-Sadr confirmed in November 2025 that it had received investigative documents from a delegation representing the Libyan Government of National Unity. The committee indicated that the Libyan delegation had confirmed that the handover of the documents marked the beginning of official cooperation between the two parties regarding this long-standing case. The Lebanese committee presented several proposals to the Libyan delegation to strengthen coordination and support the investigation.
