= Al-Sadr family =

Lebanese-Iraqi-Iranian clerical Shia family

Al-Sadr الصدر
- Shia clerical family
- Parent family: Charafeddine
- Country: Lebanon, Iraq, Iran
- Origin: Jabal Amel
- Founder: Sayyed Saleh Moussawi Ameli
- Titles: Sayyid
- Connected families: Al-Moussawi, Shahristani, Nasrallah

Al-Sadr (Arabic: الصدر) is a Hashemite Arab clerical Shia family originating from Jabal Amel in Lebanon. They are a branch of Musawi family tracing to Musa Ibn Jaafar, the seventh Shia Imam.

== History ==
Sadr is a branch of Charafeddine (Arabic: شرف الدين) family from Jabal Amel in Lebanon. The Charafeddine family itself is a branch of the Noureddine family, which traces its lineage to Moussa al-Kazim (the seventh Shi'a Imam) and through him to the first Imam, Ali ibn Abi Talib and Fatima Zahra, the daughter of Muhammad (d.632). The as-Sadr family has produced numerous Islamic scholars in Iran, Lebanon, and Iraq, including Ismail Sadr (d.1919) and his grandsons Moussa Sadr (disappeared in Libya in 1978) and Mohammad Baqir Sadr (d.1980).

== List of notables ==
- Sayyid Mohammed Hassan al-Sadr, Prime Minister of Iraq in 1948
- Sadreddine bin Saleh (also Sadr-ed-Deen bin Saleh), 19th century Islamic scholar
- Ismail Sadr, (dies 1919), son of Sadr-ed-Deen bin Saleh
- Mohammad Mohammad-Sadeq Sadr (1943–1999)
- Muqtada al-Sadr, (born 1973), son of Sadr Mohammad Mohammad Sadeq Sadr, heads a large militia in Iraq
- Sadreddine Sadr (died 1954) son of Ismail Sadr
- Imam Moussa Sadr, (1928–1978?), son of Sadreddine Sadr, Lebanese religious leader
- Haidar Sadr, (1891–1937), son of Ismail Sadr
- Mohammad Baqir al-Sadr, (1935–1980), son of Haidar Sadr and a major Islamic thinker; also known as the "Third martyr" or "Sadr I"
- Amina Sadr bint al-Huda, daughter of Haidar al-Sadr
- Mohammed Sadeq al-sadr father of sayyid Mohammed al-sadr

== Ancestors ==
Ancestor of the Sadr family, Sayyed Saleh Moussawi Ameli, was a descendant of Musa Al Kadhim, the seventh Shi'a Imam, through 27 generations:

1. Sayyid Saleh
2. Mohammad
3. Ibrahim
4. Zein el Abideen
5. Ali Noureddine
6. Noureddine Ali
7. Ezzeddine Hussien
8. Mohammad
9. Hussien
10. Ali
11. Muhammad
12. Tajeddine
13. Mohammad
14. Jalaleddine
15. Ahmad
16. Hamza
17. Saadallah
18. Hamza
19. Abul Saadat
20. Abu Mohammad
21. Mohammad
22. Abul Hasan Ali
23. Abu Tahir
24. Mohammad
25. Tahir
26. Hussien al Qat'i
27. Moussa al Thani
28. Ibrahim al Murtaza
29. Imam Musa Al Kadhim

== Family tree ==
Sayyed Saleh Musawi Ameli (b.1710 – d.1802)
Seyyed Mohammad Ali Musavi Ameli Esfahani (b. 1777 – d. 1822)	Seyyed Sadr al-Din Musawi Ameli Esfahani (b. 1779 – d. 1848)
Seyyed Musa Musavi Ameli Esfahani (b. 1818 – d. 1873)	Seyyed Esa Musavi Ameli Esfahani (b. 1815 – d. 1863)
Seyyed Jamal al-Din Va'ez Esfahani (b. 1862 – d. 1908)	Seyyed Ebrahim (b. 1851 – d. 1896)
Seyyed Mohammad Ali Jamalzadeh (b. 1892 – d. 1997)	Seyyed Esma'il Sadr (b. 1839 – d. 1919)	Seyyed Abu Ja'afar Sadr (b. 1836 – d. 1907)	Seyyed Hossein Sadr (b. 1834 – d. 1909)	Seyyed Abolhasan Sadr (b. 1827 – d. 1896)	Seyyed Mohammad Ali Sadr (b. 1824 – d. 1858)
Seyyed Mohammad Javad Sadr (b. 1884 – d. 1942)	Seyyed Sadr al-Din Sadr (b. 1882 – d. 1954)	Seyyed Heydar Sadr (b. 1891 – d. 1937)	Seyyed Mohammad Mehdi Sadr (b. 1879 – d. 1939)
Seyyed Mohammad Sadeq Sadr (b. 1906 – d. 1986)
Seyyed Mohammad Baqer Sadr (b. 1935 – d. 1980)	Seyyedeh Amineh Bent-ol-Hoda Sadr (b. 1938 – d. 1980)	Seyyed Mohammad Mohammad Sadeq Sadr (b. 1943 – d. 1999)
Ja'afar Sadr	Nobouq Sadr	Maram Sadr	Saba Sadr	Houra Sadr	Seyyed Moqtada Sadr (b. 1973–)
Seyyed Reza Sadr (b.1921 – d.1992)	Seyyed Ali Sadr (b. 1925–)	Imam Musa Sadr (b.1929 – d.1978 [?])	Seyyedeh Sediqeh Sadr	Seyyedeh Tahereh Sadr	Seyyedeh Batool Sadr	Seyyedeh Mansoureh Sadr	Seyyedeh Fatemeh Sadr	Seyyedeh Zahra Sadr	Seyyedeh Robabeh Sadr
Parvin Khalili	Mohammad Baqer Tabatab'i (b. 1914 – d. 1997)	Seyyed Mehdi Sadr-e Ameli	Hadi Ebadi	Ali Akbar Sadqi	Eskandar Firouzan	Seyyed Hosein Sharaf al-Din
Seyyed Mohammad Khatami (b. 1943)	Zohreh Sadeqi (b. 1949)
Seyyed Kazem Sadr (b. 1945–)	Seyyed Mohammad Sadr (b. 1950–)	Seyyed Mehdi Sadr (b. 1958–)	Seyyedeh Houra Sadr	Seyyedeh Maliheh Sadr	Seyyed Sadr al-Din Sadr	Seyyed Hamid Sadr	Seyyed Abdol-Hossein Tabatab'i	Seyyed Morteza Tabatab'i	Seyyedeh Fatemeh Tabatab'i	Seyyed Sadeq Tabatab'i
Leili Broujerdi	Fereshteh A'arabi	Seyyed Ahmad Khomeini (b. 1945 – d. 1995)
Seyyedeh Houra Sadr	Seyyedeh Hoda Tabatab'i	Seyyedeh Zoha Tabatab'i	Seyyed Hassan Khomeini (b. 1972–)	Seyyed Yaser Khomeini	Seyyed Ali Khomeini

== See also ==
- Family tree of Ruhollah Khomeini
