= Mohammad Mehdi Shamseddine =

Lebanese scholar of Twelver Shia

- Title: Ayatollah

Personal life
- Born: 1936 Najaf, Iraq
- Died: 10 January 2001 (aged 64–65) Lebanon
- Other name: Imam Shamseddine

Religious life
- Religion: Shia, Islam

Senior posting
- Based in: Iraq, Lebanon
- Period in office: 1936-2001
- Website: Official website of Mohammad Mahdi Shamseddine

Ayatollah Mohammad Mahdi Shamseddine (Arabic: محمد مهدي شمس الدين) was a Lebanese Twelver Shia scholar. Shahid Awwal who was known as Shamseddine, sun of the faith, was ancestor of Muhammad Mahdi.

== Biography ==
Mohammad Mehdi Shamseddine was born in 1936 in Najaf, Iraq. Allamah al-Shaykh Abdul Kareem Shamseddine was his father and studied at Najaf seminary. When Mohammad was 12 years old, his father returned to Lebanon but Muhammad Mahdi decided to stay and finish his religious studies. Grand Ayatollah Abul-Qassim Khoei and Sayed Muhsin al-Hakim were his teachers at Najaf seminary. During his time in the Iraq, he cooperated with Musa al-Sadr, Muhammad Baqir al-Sadr, and Mohammed Baqir al-Hakim.

In 1969, he returned to Lebanon and cooperated with Musa al-Sadr for founding the Supreme Shiite Council of Lebanon. He was first vice-president. Shamseddine was elected as president of the Council in April 1994. Also, he was deputy of Musa al-Sadr organization.

== Advocate of coexistence ==
Shamseddine was a moderate cleric and advocate of Christian-Muslim coexistence. About this matter, he stated that: "there is no Lebanon without its Christians and there is no Lebanon without its Muslims."

== Anti-Israeli activities ==
He was supporter of military resistance against the Israeli troops in Lebanon and formed the "Total Civil Resistance Against Israel" group after Ashura 1983 to counter the Israeli invasion. He declared that Shia attacks against Israeli forces is a religious duty.

== Blood bank ==
For avoiding practice Tatbir among people, he established a blood bank in Najaf to donate blood on Ashura day to patients who need it. Every year on 10 Muharram of the Islamic calendar, people voluntarily gave blood to the blood bank instead of practice Tatbir.
