= Mulla Muhammad Muqim =

18th-19th-century Iranian Shia scholar

Mulla Muhammad Muqim-al Baḥrānī al Kashmirī Arabic: عالم ربانی, فقیہ صمدانی, اکابر فضلا
- Succeeded by: Sayyid Safdar Shah Rizvi al Qummi
- Succeeded by: Mulla Fazal Ansari

Personal life
- Born: 18th century CE (Mughal-Durrani Kashmir) Zadibal, Srinagar
- Died: 1235 AH/1819 CE (alternatively: 1195 AH/1781 CE or 1274 AH/ 1857-58 CE
- Resting place: Baba Mazar, Zadibal Srinagar
- Home town: Srinagar
- Children: Fatima Begum
- Parent: Mulla Abdul Ali
- Dynasty: Shaykh (Bahrain)
- Region: North India
- Main interest(s): Theology, Hadith, Jurisprudence
- Notable work: Kashkūl unpublished (Persian: کشکول)
- Occupation: Teaching

Religious life
- Religion: Islam
- School: Arabic: اِثْنَا عَشَرِيَّة (iṯnā ʿašariyya, Imāmiyya)
- Sect: Shia
- Jurisprudence: Usuli
- Profession: Scholar, Theologian, Jurist, Author

Senior posting
- Teacher: Shaykh Hur Amili (disputed) Mulla Abul Ali Mulla Akbar
- Dynasty: Shaykh (Bahrain)

Muhammad Muqim-al Baḥrānī al Kashmirī ( Arabic: ملا محمد مقيم البحريني الكشميري , d. 1195AH/1781CE, 1235AH/1819CE or 1274AH/ 1857-58CE) known as Mulla Muqim and Akhund Mulla Muqim, was an influential Kashmiri Twelver Shia scholar during the period of Durrani rule in Kashmir (1752–1819). He has been described as, ‘an eminent scholar, well-mannered and meek’, ‘famous for his asceticism and piety, worship and austerities, knowledge and grace’, ‘a miracle-worker’, an intellectual who was deeply immersed in mysticism (irfan) and ‘an expert in fiqh’. On his death, he was buried within his ancestral burial plot in the Baba Mazar cemetery, located in Zadibal, Srinagar.

== Life ==
=== Family ===
The exact date of Mulla Muqim’s birth is not known, but it is assumed his birth took place somewhere in the second quarter of the eighteenth century at Srinagar. His father, Mulla Abdul Ali was a reputed scholar who authored many works on religious sciences. Apparently Muqim was the middle child amongst seven children, including a sister. The other brother were Mulla Muhsin, Mulla Javad, Mulla Akbar, Mulla Mahdi and Mulla Kazim.

The family is traditionally referred to as Mulla, Shaykh or alternatively as the Akhund and traces its origin to a Shia scholar, Mulla Muhammad Raza. Kashmiri sources maintain that Mulla Raza, arrived in Kashmir from Bahrain, somewhere in early seventeenth century. Bahrain had emerged as a center of Shia religious scholarship, after its conquest by the Safavids in 1602 CE . The Safavid arrival saw a new opportunities for native Bahrani scholars, drawing, “Arab Shi’is to Iranian religious influences, as well as making it easier for ulama to emigrate to Iran.” Given the close political and cultural linkages between Safavid Iran and Mughal India, involving a steady arrival of Iranian scholars at the Mughal court, it is possible that Mulla Raza’s journey into Mughal Kashmir occurred after the Safavid conquest of Bahrain.

In Kashmir, Raza settled down in the northern town of Sopore, where he is reported to have been killed for his Shia beliefs. Notwithstanding, this tragedy the family seems to have been publicly celebrating their Shia identity in a Sunni majority land and consequently, Raza’s son Mulla Ahmad and grandson Mulla Abdul Hakim were also killed. All the three are styled as martyrs (shahid).

=== Early life and education ===
Muqim's grandfather, Mulla Abdul Hakim was the first member of the family who relocated to Srinagar, settling down the mohalla of Nabdipora in the Shia majority ward of Zadibal. His death took place during the Shia-Sunni riot of 1132 AH/1720 CE which was orchestrated by Muḥtawī Khan alias Mulla Abdul Nabi, a Mughal noble. Eighteenth century Kashmir saw the gradual erasure of Mughal authority, with the rapid decline of the imperial authority located in the capital Shahjahanabad (Delhi). This resulted in large scale misgovernance in distant provinces of the empire such as Kashmir. Additionally, a spate of Shia-Sunni riots erupted in Srinagar during which the Shia population was plundered with a heavy loss of life and property. Muqim's early childhood was shaped by these tragic circumstances, which might have reinforced his quietist personality. Not much is known about his teachers but his early tuition would have taken place at home under his father, Mulla Abdul Ali. The nineteenth-century Shia scholar, Allama Sayyid Abul Qasim Rizvi refers to Abdul Ali as shamas-al ulema (sun of the scholars). Abdul Ali was a prolific writer who wrote numerous commentaries including one on Sharāʾiʿ al-Islām.

Sayyid Murtaza, the author of Matlah al-Anwar, refers to the renowned Lebanese Shia muhaddith, Shaykh Hur Amili (d. 1104 AH/1693 CE), author of Wasa’il al-Shia, as the teacher of Muqim. Athar Abbas Rizvi also repeats this :

Mulla Muhammad Muqim, who, in turn, was a disciple of Shaykh Hurr-al-’Amili (d. 1104/1692-93), the celebrated Iranian alim and author.

However, Mohsin Kashmiri disputes this claim, citing clear inconsistencies in the chronological timeline. Instead, Mohsin identifies Muqim's elder brother, Mulla Akbar, as one of his most significant teachers.

== Career ==
Much of Muqim's life was spent in strengthening the school of his forefathers as an institution that would establish a desperately needed system for transmission of religious knowledge and scholarship amongst Kashmiri Shia society. This was a lifelong struggle, undertaken successfully in difficult and tiring political circumstances and resulted in the creation of school which is credited for:

continuing links of knowledge transmission among Shia scholarly who owed their intellectual training directly or through an intermediary link to the madrassa of Mulla Muqim.

In 1801, another major Shia-Sunni riot took place in the Srinagar, orchestrated by the Afghan subedar, Sardar Abdullah Khan Barakzai. This riot devastated Zadibal, countless Shia lost their life and properties. This included the family library of the Shaykh family which was also burnt along with their house. Dismayed by the devastation, Muqim's elder brother, Mulla Akbar left for Baltistan and became engaged in lifelong preaching in this Himalayan borderland. In the aftermath of the riot, Muqim left for Shia ruled princely state of Awadh. The author of Matlah-al Anwar, writes about Muqim's presence in Lucknow in 1222 AH/1807 CE, accompanied by his student, Sayyid Safdar Shah (d. 1839), where he was received warmly by the Prime Minister, Hakim Mahdi Khan Kashmiri. Since its foundation under Nawab Safdar Jung, Awadh had served as a refuge for Kashmiri Shia scholars, most of who according to Jaun Cole:

Many other scholars, including Iranian and Kashmiri immigrants, taught in Awadh.

The repeated cycles of violence that targeted Kashmiri Shia, especially in Srinagar would also plague Muqim through most of his life. Earlier in 1786, he arrived in Lucknow as a refugee, along with many other Kashmiri Shia scholars, fleeing from the Afghan persecution under Subedar Mir Dad Khan Alkozi (1786–88). The Iranian scholar Aqa Ahmad Bihbahani met Muqim in Lucknow in the year 1222AH/ 1807 CE. In his travelogue, Mir’at al-Ahwal-i Jahān Nūmā he writes:

The exalted and high-titled Mullā Mohammad Muqim Kashmirī, who because of the oppression of his opponents, having fled from Kashmir has settled down in this city. He is an eminent scholar, very well-mannered and meek, and lives ensconced in his house.

== Influences and beliefs ==
The author of Najum al Sama describes Muqim as the 'foremost scholar of Kashmir', a testament to his intellectual prominence. Despite this distinguished reputation, Muqim faced significant opposition upon arriving in Awadh, where he incurred the resentment of numerous pretenders. Bihbahani notes that in Awadh, envious scholars, threatened by Muqim's eminence, falsely branded him an Akhbari, seeking to undermine his authority:

His adversaries in order to spoil his prospects and to thrive at his costs have dubbed him as a traditionalist (Akhbariaya).

The charge of being an Akhbari has also been recorded by Jaun Cole who writes:

Mulla Muhammad Muqim Kashmiri arrived in Lucknow in 1786 as a refuge, attaining a reputation as an Akhbari and a miracle-worker.

The belief that Muqim possessed the ability to perform miracles endures in the oral traditions of the Shia community in Kashmir, where his grave remains a cherished site for visitation and prayer. In the nineteenth century, the deepening debate between the Akhbari and the Usuli school was creating ruptures both within the clerical classes and amongst Shia laity. While a majority of Kashmiri Shia scholars adhered to the Usuli school, Awadh was gradually transforming from an Akhbari to an Usuli outlook. Kashmiri Shia scholars played an important role in this transformation, and were deeply respected at the court of the Awadh. In this religious background, according to Jaun Cole labelling someone as an Akhbari was a preferred method used by ambitious ulema in Faziabad, vying for patronage, against scholars who,

had gained renown and might become a source for emulation for the laity, they smeared him as a Sufi or an Akhbari.

In the struggle between Akhbari and Usuli school, Muqim's students were able to advance the case of Usuli's. It was this network of his student who helped in transforming the socio-political landscape of not only Kashmir but also major Shia dominated areas of South Asia. Foremost amongst them was his student, companion and near relative, Sayyid Safdar Shah b. Salih Rizvi al Qummi (d. 1255AH/ 1839CE). Safdar would succeed Muqim as the pre-eminent Shia scholar of Kashmir, and migrate from his hereditary seat at Haigam to the Nabidpora, the mohalla where Muqim used to stay and preach. His children would migrate to Awadh, strengthening the traditions of Shia scholarship in much of North India. Another of Muqim's student, Mulla Fazal Ansari would eventually succeed Safdar in Kashmir, establishing the Ansari family in the Srinagar as a family wielding both religious and eventually political authority of the community. A major figure who would help in creating the political background for this Shia revival in Kashmir, was another of Muqim's student, the courtier Mulla Hakim Muhammad Azim-al Din. In Punjab one of Muqim's student, Mulla Mahdi Khatai settled down in the city of Lahore. His student, Khan Bahadur Allama Sayyid Rajab Ali Shah Naqvi, ‘re-orientated Shi’i scholarship and religious life in nineteenth century Panjab.’

== Contemporaries ==
Despite the challenging political circumstances faced by the Kashmiri Shia in the eighteenth century, the community successfully preserved its rich intellectual traditions in both religious sciences and literary scholarship. During this period, many scholars’ contemporary with Muqim sought refuge in Awadh, where they flourished under the secure patronage of the Shia nawabs. Among Muqim's notable contemporaries from Kashmiri Shia community we find:

=== Religious scholars ===
Akhund Abul Qasim Kashmiri

Akhund Muhammad Reza

Mulla Abdul Hakim Rastgou

Mulla Akbar

Mulla Muhammad Ali Padshah

Mulla Munshi Muhammad Qasim

Sayyid Najaf Ali Madni

Sayyid Safdar Ali Shah-Rizvi al Qummi

=== Courtiers ===
Mirza Raza Peshkar

Mulla Hakim Muhammad Javad

== Work and contribution ==
Like many scholars of his time in Kashmir, Muqim was not a prolific writer. Most of his time was spent in teaching and laying the foundation for an intellectual revival of Shi’sim in Kashmir. The only extant work of his to have survived is, Kashkul (Beggar's Bowl). This manuscript was copied by his student, Mulla Mahdi Khatai after his death. The work is part of a genre that was not intended for formal publication but used for internal teaching purposes and covers varied subjects, which could be of importance to advanced students of Shia theology and jurisprudence. According to Mohsin the subjects covers a plethora of subjects from exegeses on Quranic verses, hadith, supplications, poems, and small treatises written by other authors.

=== Students ===
Unfortunately we do not have a complete list of Muqim's students, but some of those who studied under him and had a major impact on the socio-political life of Kashmiri Shia community include:

Mulla Fazal Ali Ansari

Mulla Hakim Muhammad Azim-al Din

Mulla Mahdi Khatai

Sayyid Safdar Ali Shah

== Death ==
Muqims death happened in Srinagar, though there are three different dates advanced for his year of death. Hakim Ghulam Safdar Hamdani records 1195AH/1781CE as the year of Muqim's death. This is based on family traditions preserved in Muqim's family. The same date has been recorded by Moulvi Ghulam Ali Gulzar. Mohsin Kashmiri favors an alternative date, 1235AH/1819CE that was recorded by Muqim's student, Mulla Mahdi Khatai in the sole surviving manuscript of Kashkul. Ather Abbas Rizvi mentions the year of Muqim's passing away as 1274 AH/ 1857-58 CE, which seems incorrect. All sources are unanimous that Muqim died in Srinagar. On his death he was buried next to his grandfather's grave at Baba Mazar, in Srinagar. The grave is marked by an old and unadorned tombstone.

== Children ==
Uncertainty surrounds the details of Muqim's children, though all sources concur he had no sons. Mohsin identifies a single daughter, Fatima Bibi, who wed Muqim's nephew, Mulla Ismail ibn Mahdi. In contrast, Mirza Muhammad Ali and Sayyid Murtaza Rizvi name Muqim's son-in-law as Mulla Muhammad Qasim, noting that a child from this union later married Muqim's student, Sayyid Safdar Ali Shah. It remains unclear whether Qasim was Fatima's husband or married to another of Muqim's daughters. On this point, Muhammad Ali specifically remarks:

The esteemed sayyid (Safdar) had taken in marriage the daughter of Mulla Muhammad Qasim, who was the son-in-law of Akhund Mulla Muhammad Muqim. Numerous accounts have been heard regarding the asceticism, piety, and godliness of the esteemed Sayyid, his deep engagement in devotional practices, the purity of his sanctified soul, and the connection he had with the celestial realm.

Fatima Bibi is said to have been a scholar herself who would offer classes to women. A handwritten manuscript of Quran said to have been copied by Fatima still exits with the Shaykh family.
