= Rabab al-Sadr =

Lebanese social and human rights activist and philanthropist

Rabab al-Sadr Charafeddine
- رباب الصدر
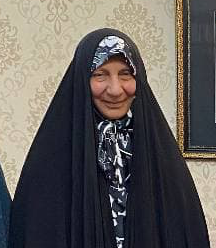
- Rabab al-Sadr in January 2022
- Born: 4 April 1944 (age 82); Qom, Imperial State of Iran
- Known for: Charitable work, advocacy
- Relatives: Musa al-Sadr (brother); Sadr al-Din al-Sadr (father)

Rabab al-Sadr Charafeddine (Arabic: رباب الصدر; born 4 April 1944) is a Lebanese activist and president of the Imam al-Sadr Foundation. She is the sister of disappeared Shia imam and political leader Musa al-Sadr.

== Early life ==
Rabab al-Sadr was born in Qom, Iran on 4 April 1944. Her father, Sayyid Sadr al-Din al-Sadr, died when she was nine years old. In 1959, at the age of 15, she and her brother moved to Tyre, Lebanon, their ancestral home.

== Education and family life ==
In her youth, al-Sadr studied fashion design and painting at an Italian university. She completed a doctorate in philosophy in 2017, with the topic "The practical philosophy of the imam Musa al-Sadr".

She is the sister of political leader, Shia imam and Amal Movement leader Musa al-Sadr.

Al-Sadr was married to Hussein Charafeddine at age of 16. They have four children, including Raed Charafeddine and Najad Charafeddine. She has eleven grandchildren.

== Career ==
Al-Sadr is the president of the Tyre-based Imam al-Sadr Foundation, a non-governmental organization in southern Lebanon.

The foundation traces it roots to the Dar al-Fatta ("Girls' House") founded by Rabab and Musa al-Sadr in 1962, three years after their arrival in Tyre. This organization taught women skills such as knitting, embroidery, housekeeping, and first aid. After Musa's disappearance on 31 August 1978, Rabab took over the management. Since then, the foundation has grown to its current state, providing education, social, and health services.

During the Lebanese Civil War, al-Sadr traveled Lebanon trying to convince women to not let their male family members partake in the war, as well as offering guidance and services to those affected by the war. Also during the war, she negotiated for the release of victims of kidnapping on both sides.

On 13 August 2017, al-Sadr was awarded the Grand Cross of the Order of Malta for her cooperation with the organization.

== Honours and awards ==
- Cross Pro Merito Melitensi from the Sovereign Military Order of Malta, 1991.
- Grande Médaille d’Or avec Croix et Cordon from a French charitable and humanitarian organization, 1992.
- National Order of the Cedar, knight, 1993.
- Certificate of recognition from the Secretary-General of the United Nations, 2000.
- Honorary Doctorate of Humane Letters from the Lebanese American University, 2006.
- Grand Cross of the Lebanese Association of the Sovereign Military Order of Malta, 2017.
- Officer of the French Legion of Honour, 2020.

== Memoir ==
The book Miriam (میریام) is al-Sadr's memoir. The compilation process of Miriam was extensive and prolonged. Apart from two initial sessions held in 2012 in Tehran, further interviews were delayed due to her presence in Lebanon. Ultimately, through multiple trips to Lebanon, 12 sessions were conducted between 2014 and 2015, alongside four additional sessions in Tehran during the same period. Subsequently, 18 sessions were held to review the text, accompanied by two supplementary interviews in 2022 in both Lebanon and Tehran.
