= Bazanti =

Shia muhaddith and jurist in the late 8th-9th century

Ahmad ibn Muḥammad ibn Abi Naṣr al-Bazanti أحمد إبن محمّد إبن أبي نصر البزنطي

Personal life
- Born: 152 Hijri / 769-70 CE
- Died: 221 Hijri / 835-6 CE

Religious life
- Religion: Islam
- Denomination: Twelver Shia
- Jurisprudence: Ja'fari

Muslim leader
- Teacher: Jamil ibn Darraj, Aban ibn Uthman
- Disciple of: Musa al-Kazim, Ali al-Rida, Muhammad al-Jawad
- Students: Ali ibn Mahziar Ahvazi

Abu Ja'far Ahmad ibn Muḥammad ibn Abi Naṣr al-Bazanti (Arabic: أبو جعفر أحمد إبن محمّد إبن أبي نصر البزنطي), also known as al-Bazanti, was a Shia Muslim muhaddith, jurist and a companion of the seventh, eighth and ninth Shia Imams, Musa al-Kazim (765—799), Ali al-Rida (799–818), and Muhammad al-Jawad (818–835) respectively.

Al-Bazanti was a mawla (non-Arab client) OF al-Sakun clan of the Kinda tribe from Yemen. He was born in 152 Hijri (769-70 CE), and died in 221 Hijri (835-36 CE). He was mentioned as one of the six important jurists from the Companions of Musa al-Kazim and Ali al-Rida.

== Students and narrators ==
In the list of his narrators, the names of personalities such as Ali ibn Ibrahim al-Qummi, Hossein Ibn Saeed Ahwazi, Ahmad ibn Muhammad ibn Khalid al-Barqi, al-Hassan Ibn Mahbub and Ali ibn Mahziar Ahvazi can be seen. Among his students, Muhammad ibn Isa ibn Obaid Yaqtini should also be mentioned, who, according to his own words, learned from him in 10 AH/25 AD.

== Works ==
Among his works, the ones with jurisprudential importance are:

- Al-Jami' : In the lists of Bazanti's works, Al-Jami' is at the top and this writing, as it is based on the knowledge of the society of that era, contains a wide collection of news in various fields of religious epistemology.Copies of this work have survived until the 19th century, so that one can find excerpts and quotations from it in various works of those centuries by ibn Idris al-Hilli.
- Al-Masa'il : Ibn Nadim mentioned this work in his list, and its title is recorded in Ahmad ibn Muhammad al-Zurari message. It should be mentioned that there was also a version containing a collection of jurisprudential hadiths in the form of questions and answers between Bazanti and Ali al-Rida, narrated by Abd Allah ibn ja'far al-Himyari, which may be the same as Kitab al-Masal. This version has survived as a part of Hamiri'sAsnaad, and it is included in the section related to Ali al-Rida of this book, Hamiri, 51–73.
- Al-Nawadir: In his list, Sheikh Tusi mentioned a work by Bazanti with this title, and introduced Yahya ibn Zakaria ibn shiban as its narrator. Also, in the list of Bazanti works, Najashi mentioned two different books with the title Nawadar, the first of which was according to Yahya Bin zakaria, Sheikh Tusi, Al-Furst, also Najashi, ibid. There were copies of this work until the 10th century, and Ibn Idris recorded excerpts of its narrations in Mustarafat-Saraer, pp. 72–75.

It should be said that a copy or copies of Bazanti jurisprudential-narrative works were in Ibn Babawiyah's possession.
