= Nur al-Din Ali al-Karaki =

Personal life
- Born: 1464 Baalbek, Mamluk Sultanate (present-day Lebanon)
- Died: 1533 (aged 68–69) Najaf, Safavid Iran (present-day Iraq)

Religious life
- Religion: Islam
- Denomination: Shia
- Jurisprudence: Ja'fari
- Creed: Twelver

Nur al-Din Ali al-Karaki, commonly known as Muhaqqiq Karaki or Muhaqqiq al-Thani (1464–1533) was a leading Arab Twelver Shia scholar in Safavid Iran.

== Sources ==
- Abisaab, Rula Jurdi (2010). "Karaki". In Yarshater, Ehsan (ed.). Encyclopædia Iranica (Online ed.). Encyclopædia Iranica Foundation. ISBN 978-1934283271.
