= Muhammad ibn Makki =

Muḥammad ibn Makkī
- Title: Shams al-Din, al-Shahid al-Awwal

Personal life
- Born: 1334 Jezzine
- Died: 7 July 1385 (aged 51)
- Era: Mamluk Sultanate
- Region: Jabal Amel, Damascus, Khorasan
- Notable work(s): Al-Lum'ah al-Dimashqiyah, al-'Arbaʿun Hadith, The Lessons

Religious life
- Religion: Islam
- Denomination: Shia
- Sect: Twelver
- Jurisprudence: Ja'fari

Shams al-Dīn (شَمْس ٱلدِّين) Abū ʿAbd Allāh Muḥammad ibn Makkī ibn Ḥāmid al-Nabaṭī al-ʿĀmilī al-Jizzīnī (c. 1334–1385), better known as al-Shāhīd al-Awwal (Arabic: ٱلشَّهِيد ٱلْأَوَّل, "The First Martyr"), was a 14th century Shia Muslim scholar and jurist from Jezzine in present-day Lebanon. He is famously known as the author of al-Lum'ah al-Dimashqiyah (ٱللُّمْعَة ٱلدِّمَشْقِيَّة) (The Damascene Glitter). Though he is neither the first Muslim nor the first Shia to die for his religion, he's as "Shahid al-Awwal" because he was probably the first Shia scholar of such stature to have been killed in a brutal manner.

== Life ==
He was born in 734 AH/1334 CE in Jabal 'Amel. His nisbah "al-Jezzini" indicates that his family was also from Jezzine in modern-day Lebanon. When Muhammad ibn Makki was 16 years old he went to study at the city of Hilla in modern-day Iraq. He returned home when he was 21. He used taqiyya to establish himself as one of the religious scholars of Damascus, using Sunni law to judge Sunnis, while covertly judging the Shia using Shia law.

== Death ==
He was executed on Thursday the ninth of Jumada al-awwal, 786 A.H. (ca. 1385) during the reign of Sultan Barquq. His death was in accordance with the fatwa of a jurist from the Maliki madhab, which was endorsed by a jurisprudent of the Shaf'i madhab. Accusations against him included rafd, defamation of senior Islamic personages, the companions and family of Muhammad, Aisha, Abu Bakr and Umar, following the Nusayri faith, and permitting the drinking of wine.

These accusations were first brought against him by two of his former students from Jabal Amil, who were also former Twelver Shiites. One of them, Yusuf ibn Yahya, submitted a report (which included the signatures of 70 former Shiites from Jabal Amil) to the authorities detailing al-Amili's "vile doctrines and abominable beliefs."

However, according to Shia biographer al-Khwansari, al-Amili denied these charges in a letter to the governor of Damascus, protesting his love for "the Prophet and all who loved him, all the Companions without exception." He was imprisoned for one year in the Citadel of Damascus, then beheaded by sword. His corpse was then crucified and stoned in the city whereby it was burned and the ashes were discarded into the air.

== See also ==
- The Five Martyrs
