= Sadr al-Din al-Sadr =

Iraqi grand ayatollah (1882–1953)

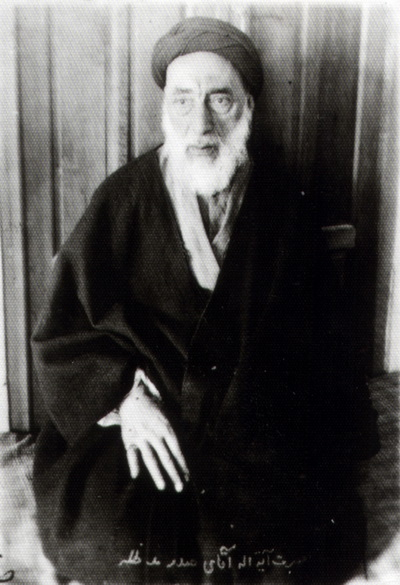

Sadr al-Din Sadr (Arabic: صدر الدين الصدر; 1882 – 26 November 1953) was the father of Moussa as-Sadr (disappeared in Libya in 1978) and Rabab al-Sadr, and the grandson of the Grand Ayatollah Sadr al-Din bin Saleh after whom the Sadr family of well-known scholars of Twelver Shi'a Islam has been named.

He was the second son of Sayyed Grand Ayatollah Ismail as-Sadr (d. 1920). He was born in what is today Iraq to Lebanese parents and led a religious school there. He then migrated to Khorasan where he married the daughter of Grand Ayatollah Hussein al-Qummi (wikidata:Q20557209). Then he left to the Shia center of learning (hawzayi'ilmī) in Qom, Iran, where he became a Grand Ayatollah. He died on 26 November 1953 in Iran.

== See also ==
- Haydar al-Sadr
- Hibatuddin Shahrestani
- Muhammad Baqir al-Sadr
- Mohammed al-Sadr
- List of Shia scholars of Islam
- List of ayatollahs
