= Muqtada al-Sadr =

Iraqi Shia cleric, politician and former militia leader (born 1974)

Sayyid Muqtada al-Sadr
- مقتدى الصدر
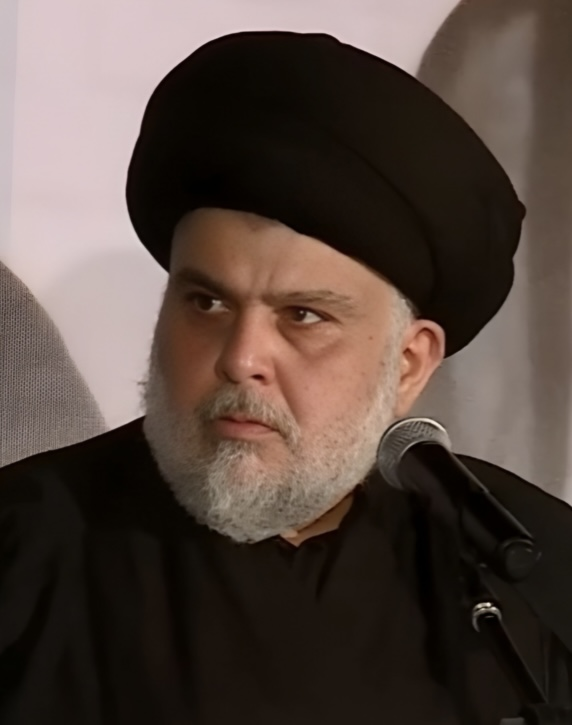
- Al-Sadr in 2022

Leader of the Sadrist Movement
- Incumbent
- Assumed office 5 December 2003
- Preceded by: Mohammad al-Sadr

Personal life
- Born: 4 August 1974 (age 52) Najaf, Ba'athist Iraq
- Parent: Mohammed al-Sadr (father)
- Political party: National Shiite Movement; Other parties Al-Ahrar Bloc (2014–2018); Alliance Towards Reforms (Saairun) (2018–2021)

Religious life
- Religion: Islam
- Denomination: Twelver Shi'ism
- School: Usuli

Muslim leader
- Residence: Hanana, Najaf, Iraq

Muqtada al-Sadr (Note: Arabic: مقتدى الصدر, romanized: Muqtadā aṣ-Ṣadr) (born 4 August 1974) is an Iraqi cleric, politician and former militia leader. A leading Shia Muslim figure, he inherited the leadership of the Sadrist Movement from his father, and founded the now-dissolved Mahdi Army militia in 2003 that resisted the American occupation of Iraq.

He also founded the Promised Day Brigade insurgent group after the dissolution of the Mahdi Army; In 2014, he founded the Peace Companies militia and serves as its current head. In 2018, he joined his Sadrist political party to the Saairun alliance, which won the highest number of seats in the 2018 and 2021 Iraqi parliamentary elections.

== Titles ==
He belongs to the prominent al-Sadr family that hails from Jabal Amel in Lebanon, before later settling in Najaf. Sadr is the son of Muhammad al-Sadr, an Iraqi religious figure and politician who stood against Saddam Hussein, and the nephew of Mohammad Baqir al-Sadr. He is often styled with the honorific title Sayyid.

His formal religious standing within the Shi'i clerical hierarchy is comparatively mid-ranking, being within the lines of a Hujjat al-Islam. As a result of this, in 2008 Sadr claimed for himself neither the title of mujtahid (the equivalent of a senior religious scholar) nor the authority to issue any fatwas. In early 2008, he was reported to be studying to be an ayatollah, something that would greatly improve his religious standing.

His religious ranking, partly due to the fact that he could never complete his formal education under Mohammed al-Sadr on account of his assassination, required him to remain a Muqallid of Kadhem al-Haeri, the pre-eminent student of his father, for most of his life as well as currently.

== Family ==
Muqtada al-Sadr is the fourth son of a famous Iraqi Shia cleric, the late Grand Ayatollah Muhammad al-Sadr. He is also the son-in-law of Grand Ayatollah Muhammad Baqir al-Sadr. Both were revered for their concern for the poor.

Muqtada is a citizen of Iraq; his great-grandfather is Ismail as-Sadr. Mohammed Sadeq al-Sadr, Muqtada al-Sadr's father, was a respected figure throughout the Shi'a Islamic world. He was murdered, along with two of his sons, allegedly by the government of Saddam Hussein. Muqtada's father-in-law was executed by the Iraqi authorities in 1980. Muqtada is a cousin of the disappeared Musa al-Sadr, the Iranian-Lebanese founder of the popular Amal Movement.

In 1994, Sadr married one of Muhammad Baqir al-Sadr's daughters. As of 2008, he had no children.

== Political positions ==
Muqtada al-Sadr gained popularity in Iraq following the toppling of the Saddam government by the 2003 US invasion of Iraq. Sadr has on occasion stated that he wishes to create an "Islamic democracy".

Sadr commands strong support (especially in the Sadr City district in Baghdad, formerly named Saddam City but renamed after the elder Sadr). After the fall of the Saddam government in 2003, Muqtada al-Sadr organized thousands of his supporters into a political movement, which includes a military wing formerly known as the Jaysh al-Mahdi or Mahdi Army. The name refers to the Mahdi, a long-since disappeared Imam who is believed by Shi'as to be due to reappear when the end of time approaches. This group periodically engaged in violent conflict with the United States and other Coalition forces, while the larger Sadrist movement has formed its own religious courts and organized social services, law enforcement and prisons in areas under its control. Western media often referred to Muqtada al-Sadr as an "anti-American" or "radical" cleric.

His strongest support came from the class of dispossessed Shi'a, like in the Sadr City area of Baghdad. Many Iraqi supporters see in him a symbol of resistance to foreign occupation. The Mahdi army was reported to have operated death squads during the Iraqi Civil War.

In a statement received by AFP on 15 February 2014, Sadr announced the closure of all offices, centers and associations affiliated with Al-Shaheed Al-Sadr, his father, inside and outside Iraq, and announced his non-intervention in all political affairs, adding that no bloc will represent the movement inside or outside the government or parliament. Several times he has called for all paramilitary groups recognised by the Iraqi state to be dissolved after the complete defeat of ISIL and that all foreign forces (including Iran) then leave Iraqi territory. He surprised many when he visited the crown princes of both Saudi Arabia, for the first time in 11 years, and the United Arab Emirates (UAE) in 2017 and earlier and was criticized in some Iranian circles. In April 2017, he distinguished himself from other Iraqi Shiite leaders in calling on Iranian-backed Syrian President Bashar al-Assad to step down and save the country from more bloodshed. Sadr's efforts to strengthen relations between Saudi Arabia and Iraq mirror those of former Iraqi Prime Minister Haider al-Abadi.

== Timeline of political positions during US Presence in Iraq ==
During the period of US Operations in Iraq, Al-Sadr was consistently highly vocal in opposing the US presence.

=== 2003 ===
Shortly after the US-led coalition ousted Saddam Hussein and his Ba'ath regime, al-Sadr voiced opposition to the Coalition Provisional Authority. He subsequently stated that he had more legitimacy than the Coalition-appointed Iraqi Governing Council. He granted his first major Western television interview to Bob Simon of 60 Minutes, in which al-Sadr famously said "Saddam was the little serpent, but America is the big serpent."

In May 2003, al-Sadr passed a fatwa that became known as the al-Hawasim (meaning 'the finalists' – a term used to refer to the looters of post-invasion Iraq). The fatwa allowed looting and racketeering on the condition that the perpetrators take their share from harbiyyun, and pay the requisite khums to the remaining office of Muhammad al-Sadr, saying that "looters could hold on to what they had appropriated so long as they made a donation (khums) of one-fifth of its value to their local Sadrist office." The fatwa alienated many older members of his father's movement, as well as mainstream Shiites, and the Shia establishment and property-owning classes from the Sadrists. However, the fatwa strengthened his popularity among the poorest members of society, notably in Sadr City. It has been claimed that the original fatwa itself was actually issued by Sadr's advisor Grand Ayatollah Kazem Husseini Haeri, and that al-Sadr was simply passing on the same ruling, as al-Sadr himself is not a Mujtahid, but himself a follower of Haeri.

Al-Sadr is suspected in US news media of having ordered the assassination of rival Shia leader Abdul-Majid al-Khoei in 2003, a charge he denies and which remains unproven.

=== 2004 ===
In his 2004 sermons and public interviews, al-Sadr repeatedly demanded an immediate withdrawal of all US-led coalition forces, all foreign troops under United Nations control, and the establishment of a new central Iraqi government, not connected to the Ba'ath party or the Allawi government.

In late March 2004, American authorities (759th MP Battalion) in Iraq shut down Sadr's newspaper al-Hawza on charges of inciting violence. Sadr's followers held demonstrations protesting the closure of the newspaper. On 4 April, fighting broke out in Najaf, Sadr City, and Basra. Sadr's Mahdi Army took over several points and attacked coalition soldiers, killing dozens of foreign soldiers, and taking many casualties of their own in the process. At the same time, Sunni rebels in the cities of Baghdad, Samarra, Ramadi, and, most notably, Fallujah, staged uprisings as well, causing the most serious challenge to American control of Iraq up to that time.

During the first siege of Fallujah in late March and April 2004, Muqtada's Sadrists sent aid convoys to the besieged Sunnis there.

Paul Bremer, then the US administrator in Iraq, declared on 5 April 2004 that al-Sadr was an outlaw and that uprisings by his followers would not be tolerated.

That day, al-Sadr called for a jihad against American forces. To do this he needed to gain temporary control of Al Kut, An Najaf and the suburb of Baghdad named after his grandfather, Sadr City. On the night of 8 April, his Mahdi Army dropped eight overspans and bridges around the Convoy Support Center Scania, thus severing northbound traffic into Baghdad. The next day his militia ambushed any and every convoy trying to get in or out of Baghdad International Airport, known to the soldiers as BIAP. This led to the worst convoy ambush of the war, the ambush of the 724th Transportation Company (POL), which resulted in eight KBR drivers killed and three soldiers killed. One was Matt Maupin, who was initially listed as the first American soldier missing in action. These series of attacks demonstrated an unexpected level of sophistication in planning. The Mahdi Army knew it could not win a head on fight with the United States military coalition and it took full advantage of a major American vulnerability by attacking convoy trucks that supplied the troops. BIAP was where the newly arrived 1st Cavalry Division drew its supplies. The 1st Cavalry Division was replacing the 1st Armored Division in and around Baghdad. The 1st Armored Division as well as 2nd Armored Cavalry Regiment, which was attached to 1st Armored Division, had already been deployed to Iraq for a year. CENTCOM commander General John Abizaid decided to extend the Division beyond its 1-year deployment, for an additional 120 days, to use in the fight against the Mahdi Army. On 11 April, the Mahdi Army launched an attack on the southwest wall at BIAP behind which several hundred trucks parked. By the end of April, the American 1st Armored Division had suppressed the Mahdi Army's uprising but al Sadr had achieved his goal of making it a significant resistance force fighting against the U.S. led coalition forces occupying Iraq.

=== 2005–2006 ===
It is generally frowned upon in Iraq for clerics to actively participate in secular politics, and like the other leading religious figures, Muqtada al-Sadr did not run in the 2005 Iraqi elections. It is believed he implicitly backed the National Independent Cadres and Elites party that was closely linked with the Mahdi Army. Many of his supporters, however, backed the far more popular United Iraqi Alliance (UIA) of Grand Ayatollah Sistani.

On 26 August 2005, an estimated 100,000 Iraqis marched in support of al-Sadr and his ideals.

On 25 March 2006, Sadr was in his home and escaped a mortar attack; this attack was disputed, as the ordnance landed more than 50 meters from his home.

Sadr's considerable leverage was apparent early in the week of 16 October 2006, when Prime Minister Nouri al-Maliki ordered the release of one of Sadr's senior aides. The aide had been arrested a day earlier by American troops on suspicion of participating in kidnappings and killings.

=== 2007 ===
On 13 February, several sources in the US government claimed that Muqtada al-Sadr had left Iraq and fled to Iran in anticipation of the coming security crackdown. US military spokesman Maj. Gen. William B. Caldwell reinforced this account on 14 February, but a member of Iraq's parliament and an aide to al-Sadr denied the claims.

On 30 March it was reported that Sadr, through clerics speaking on his behalf, "delivered a searing speech ... condemning the American presence in Iraq ... [and] call[ing] for an anti-occupation mass protest on April 9." This call to protest was significant in that, since the beginning of the American troop surge (which began on 14 February 2007), al-Sadr had ordered his "militia to lie low during the new Baghdad security plan so as not to provoke a direct confrontation with the Americans".

In a statement stamped with Sadr's official seal and distributed in the Shiite holy city of Najaf a day before the demonstration, on Sunday, 8 April 2007, Muqtada al-Sadr urged the Iraqi army and police to stop cooperating with the United States and told his guerilla fighters to concentrate on pushing American forces out of the country. "You, the Iraqi army and police forces, don't walk alongside the occupiers, because they are your arch-enemy," the statement said.

On 17 April 2007, several ministers loyal to al-Sadr left the Iraqi government. Iraqi Prime Minister Nouri al-Maliki stated that the withdrawal of these ministers had not weakened his government and that he would name technocrats to replace them soon.

On 25 April 2007, Sadr condemned the construction of Azamiyah wall around a Sunni neighbourhood in Baghdad, by calling for demonstrations against the plan as a sign of "the evil will" of American "occupiers"

On 25 May 2007, Sadr delivered a sermon to an estimated 6,000 followers in Kufa. Sadr reiterated his condemnation of the United States' occupation of Iraq and demanded the withdrawal of foreign forces, al-Sadr's speech also contained calls for unity between Sunni and Shi'a. In June 2007, al-Sadr vowed to go ahead with a planned march to the devastated Askariyya shrine in central Iraq, al-Sadr said the march was aimed at bringing Shi'is and Sunnis closer together and breaking down the barriers imposed by the Americans and Sunni religious extremists.

In a statement issued 29 August 2007, Muqtada al-Sadr announced that an order to stand down for six months had been distributed to his loyalists following the deaths of more than 50 Shia Muslim pilgrims during fighting in Karbala the day before. The statement issued by Sadr's office in Najaf said: "I direct the Mahdi army to suspend all its activities for six months until it is restructured in a way that helps honour the principles for which it is formed." The intention behind the ceasefire was thought in part to be to allow al-Sadr reassert control over the movement, which is thought to have splintered. "We call on all Sadrists to observe self-restraint, to help security forces control the situation and arrest the perpetrators and sedition mongers, and urge them to end all forms of armament in the sacred city," said the statement, referring to the 28 August clashes in Karbala. Asked if the unexpected order meant no attacks on American troops, as well as a ban on Shia infighting, a senior Sadr aide said: "All kinds of armed actions are to be frozen, without exception."

=== 2008–2011 ===
In March 2008, during the Battle of Basra, the Sadr Movement launched a nationwide civil disobedience campaign across Iraq to protest raids and detentions against the Mahdi Army.

In August 2008, Sadr ordered most of his militiamen to disarm but said he will maintain elite fighting units to resist the Americans if a timetable for the withdrawal of US troops is not established. "Weapons are to be exclusively in the hands of one group, the resistance group," while another group called Momahidoun is to focus on social, religious and community work, Sadrist cleric Mudhafar al-Moussawi said.

In response to Israeli attacks on Gaza, al-Sadr called for reprisals against US troops in Iraq: "I call upon the honest Iraqi resistance to carry out revenge operations against the great accomplice of the Zionist enemy."

On 1 May 2009, al-Sadr paid a surprise visit to Ankara where, in his first public appearance for two years, he met with Turkish President Abdullah Gül and Prime Minister Recep Tayyip Erdoğan for talks that focused on the "political process" and requested Turkey play a greater role in establishing stability in the Middle East. Spokesman Sheikh Salah al-Obeidi confirmed the nature of the talks that had been requested by al-Sadr and stated, "Turkey is a good, old friend. Trusting that, we had no hesitation in travelling here." After the meeting al-Sadr visited supporters in Istanbul, where al-Obeidi says they may open a representative office.

In a press conference on 6 March 2010, ahead of the 2010 Iraqi parliamentary election, Sadr called on all Iraqis to participate in the election and support those who seek to expel US troops out of the country. Sadr warned that any interference by the United States will be unacceptable.

On 5 January 2011, Sadr returned to the Iraqi city of Najaf in order to take a more proactive and visible role in the new Iraqi government. Three days later, thousands of Iraqis turned out in Najaf to hear his first speech since his return, in which he called the US, Israel, and the UK "common enemies" against Iraq. His speech was greeted by the crowd chanting "Yes, yes for Muqtada! Yes, yes for the leader!" while waving Iraqi flags and al-Sadr's pictures. Subsequently, he returned to Iran to continue his studies.

By late 2011, it appeared that the United States would largely withdraw from Iraq, a demand that helped make Sadr a popular leader amongst supporters almost immediately following the invasion. Sadr also controlled the largest bloc of parliament, and had reached a sort of détente with prime minister Nouri al Maliki, who needed Sadrist support to retain his post.

== Timeline of political activity after US withdrawal ==
Following the US withdrawal, Al-Sadr emerged as a key leader in favor of a unified and non-sectarian national government.

=== 2011–2020 ===
On 5 January 2011, Sadr returned from Iran, to Najaf, having spent four years out of the country after vowing never to return unless the American military forces left. Prior to his arrival in Najaf, he had been instrumental in the formation of the 2011 Iraqi government.

Following the US withdrawal from Iraq, Sadr continued to be an influential figure in Iraqi politics, associated with the Al-Ahrar bloc, whose Shi'a factions are still at war with not only the government but also the Sunni factions. However, whereas during the war al-Sadr was known for advocating violence, in 2012 he began to present himself as a proponent of moderation and tolerance and called for peace. According to Britannica, "although Sadr himself was once an image of Iraqi Shiʿa militancy, he came to see sectarianism as a source of dysfunction and corruption in government and began steering his supporters away from sectarianism."

In February 2014, Sadr announced that he was withdrawing from politics and dissolving the party structure to protect his family's reputation.

However, later in 2014, he called for the formation of "Peace Companies", often mistranslated as "Peace Brigades", to protect Shia shrines from the Islamic State of Iraq and the Levant. In June, these Peace Companies marched in Sadr City. In addition to guarding shrines, the Peace Companies participated in offensive operations such as the recapture of Jurf al-Nasr in October 2014. They suspended their activities temporarily in February 2015, but were active in the Second Battle of Tikrit in March.

Sadr is considered a populist by Western observers. In 2015 he entered into an alliance with the Iraqi Communist Party and other secular groups "under an umbrella of security and corruption concerns", both long-standing issues of daily life in the country. In March 2015, Sadr criticized the Saudi Arabian-led intervention in Yemen, saying that "It is at odds with Islamic-Arabic unity".

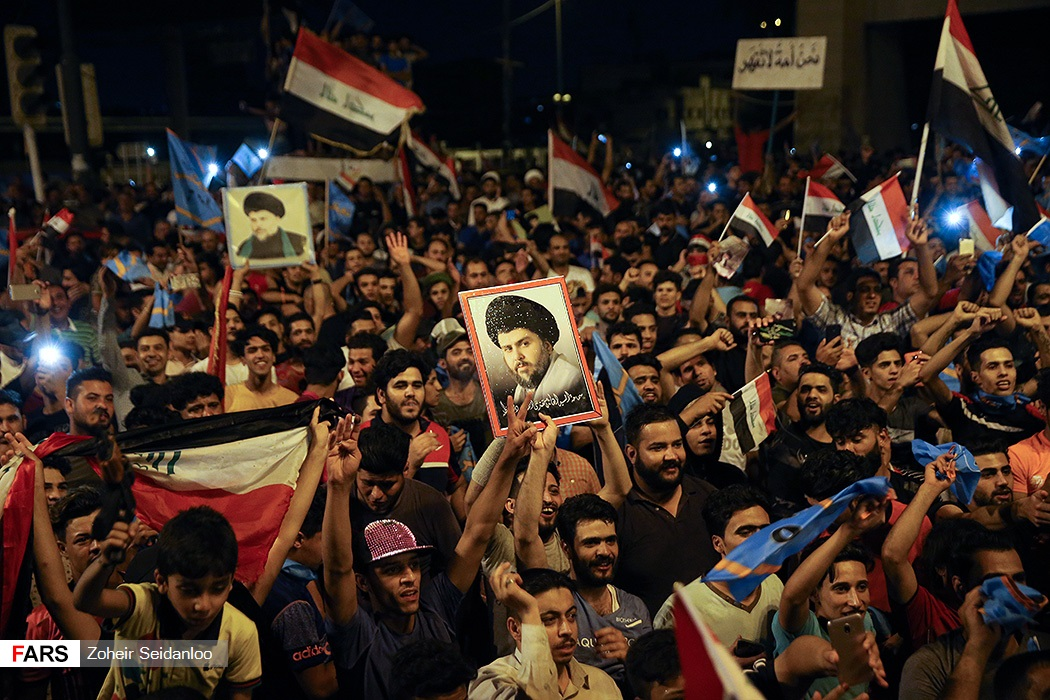
Supporters of Sadr's alliance in Liberation Square, Baghdad celebrating after a successful election campaign in 2018

On 26 February 2016, Sadr led a one million-strong demonstration in Baghdad's Tahrir Square to protest corruption in Iraq and the government's failure to deliver on reforms. "Abadi must carry out grassroots reform," Sadr said in front of the protesters. "Raise your voice and shout so the corrupt get scared of you," he encouraged the people. On 18 March, Sadr's followers began a sit-in outside the Green Zone, a heavily fortified district in Baghdad housing government offices and embassies. He called the Green Zone "a bastion of support for corruption". On 27 March, he walked into the Green Zone to begin a sit-in, urging followers to stay outside and remain peaceful. He met with Abadi on 26 December to discuss the reform project he proposed during protests early in the year. Following the Khan Shaykhun chemical attack in Syria on 4 April 2017, Sadr called for Syrian president Bashar al-Assad to step down. In July 2017, Sadr visited Saudi Arabia and met Crown Prince Mohammad bin Salman.

In 2017 he condemned the Trump administration's open support of Israeli claims about Jerusalem and advocated the closure of the U.S. Embassy in Baghdad due to American announcements related to their forthcoming embassy move in Israel which he saw as a 'declaration of war on Islam.'

In April 2018, Sadr wrote: "I am ready to intervene between the Islamic Republic and Kingdom of Saudi Arabia to resolve some issues, even gradually, and that is for nothing but the best of Iraq and the region."

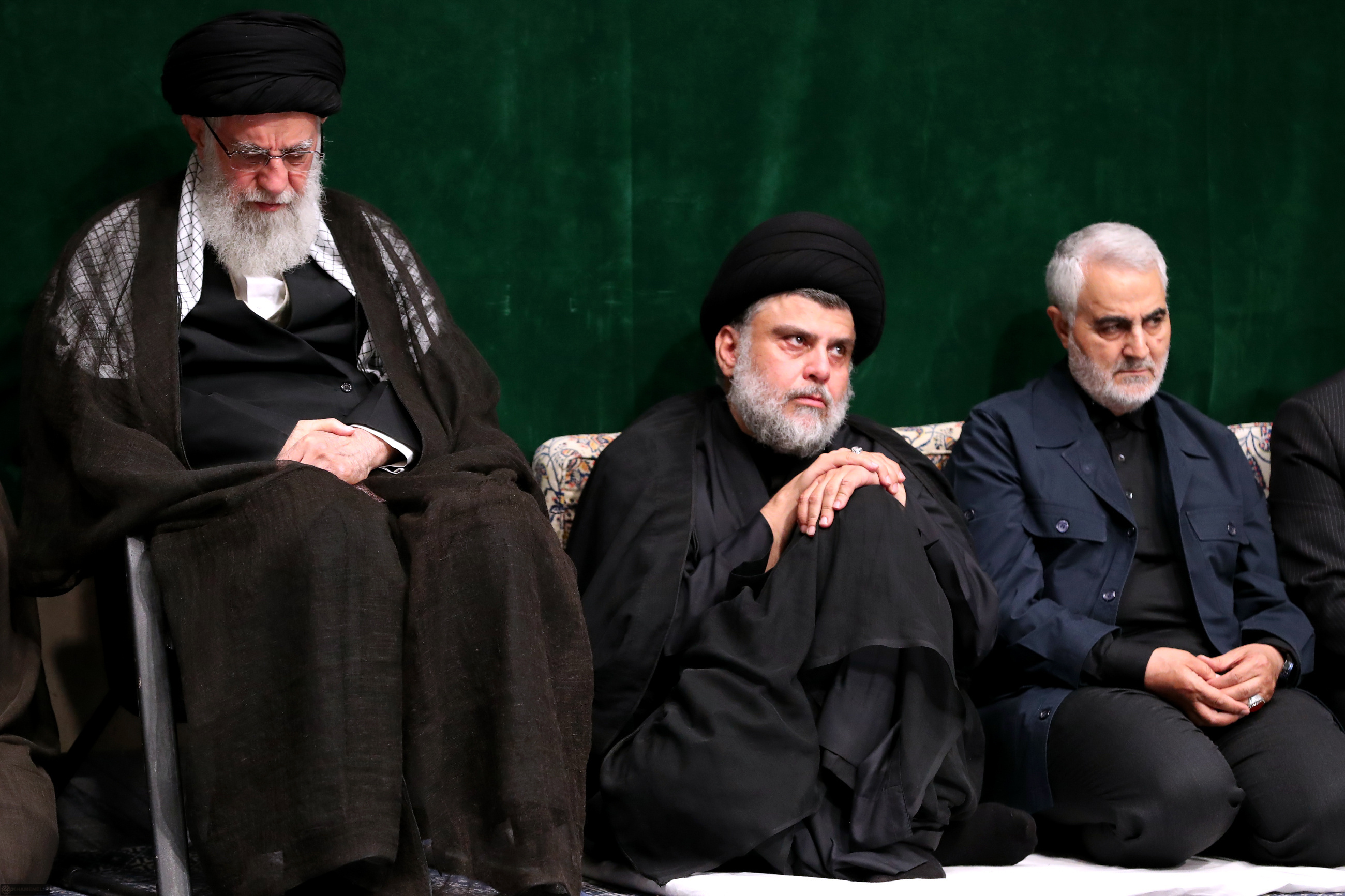
Muqtada al-Sadr in Tehran in 2019 with Ali Khamenei siting on a chair on the left and Qasem Soleimani to the right

In May 2018, Sadr's Sairoon electoral list won 54 seats in the first Iraqi parliamentary election since the Islamic State was declared defeated in Iraq. He rejected U.S. interference in the formation of the new Iraqi government, saying: "The U.S. is an invader country; we do not allow it to interfere" in Iraqi affairs." In a country riven by sectarian tensions and regional politics, Sadr has transformed himself again: He has now positioned himself as an Iraqi nationalist; his newly formed Istiqāmah ("Integrity") Party allied himself with communists and smaller groups including Sunnis, secularists, liberals, and political independents; criticized corruption, Iran's outsized influence in Iraq; and strongly criticized the sectarian nature of Iraq's politics. Following the May 2018 elections the son of Supreme Leader Ayatollah Ali Khamenei and General Soleimani lobbied Sadr and others to forge a political coalition allied with Tehran.

After months of winning parliamentary elections, Sadr favored the return of Iraqi Jews to Iraq, which was received positively by a majority of the Iraqis.

On 7 December 2019, an armed drone attack targeted Sadr's home in Baghdad. Sadr was out of the country at the time; the attack caused little damage and no casualties.

After the assassination of Qasem Soleimani in January 2020 and the Iraqi parliament's resolution favouring expulsion of US troops, the Iraqi Shia leader called for "the immediate cancellation of the security agreement with the US, the closure of the US embassy, the expulsion of US troops in a 'humiliating manner', and criminalizing communication with the US government". Following the 8 January 2020 Iranian rocket attacks on US led military bases, however, Sadr held back and urged his followers not to attack U.S. elements in Iraq.

On 25 December 2020, Sadr warned Iran and the United States not to involve Iraq in their conflict.

=== 2021–present ===
After 2021 Iraqi parliamentary election Sadrist bloc finished first with 73 seats, resulting in 2022 Iraqi political crisis. Sadr amassed majority in parliament that included Kurdish KDP and Sunni Progress Party and Azem Alliance. The majority excluded pro-Iran Coordination Framework. After that, Supreme Court of Iraq ruled that parliament requires 2/3 quorum to elect the President, allowing Coordination Framework to block the process. In protest, on 13 June 2022, 73 MPs from Sadr's bloc resigned from parliament. As a result, the Coordination Framework bloc, an alliance of Iran-backed parties led by Nouri al-Maliki, grew to 130 seats.

Followers of al-Sadr stormed Iraqi parliament on 27 July, and again on 30 July. On August 29 Sadr's supporters stormed the Republican Palace in the Green Zone, 30 of them were killed in the clashes.

On 29 August 2022, Sadr announced his retirement from Iraq politics and the closure of most of his offices and institutions.

In May 2024, Sadr called for the closure of the US embassy in Baghdad following Israeli airstrikes on the Tel al-Sultan refugee camp in Gaza.

On 5 December 2024, Sadr posted a message on Twitter urging "Iraq's government, people, parties, militias and security forces" not to intervene in Syria amid the collapse of government forces due to a rebel offensive launched in late November.

== Conflicts with the Swedish Government ==
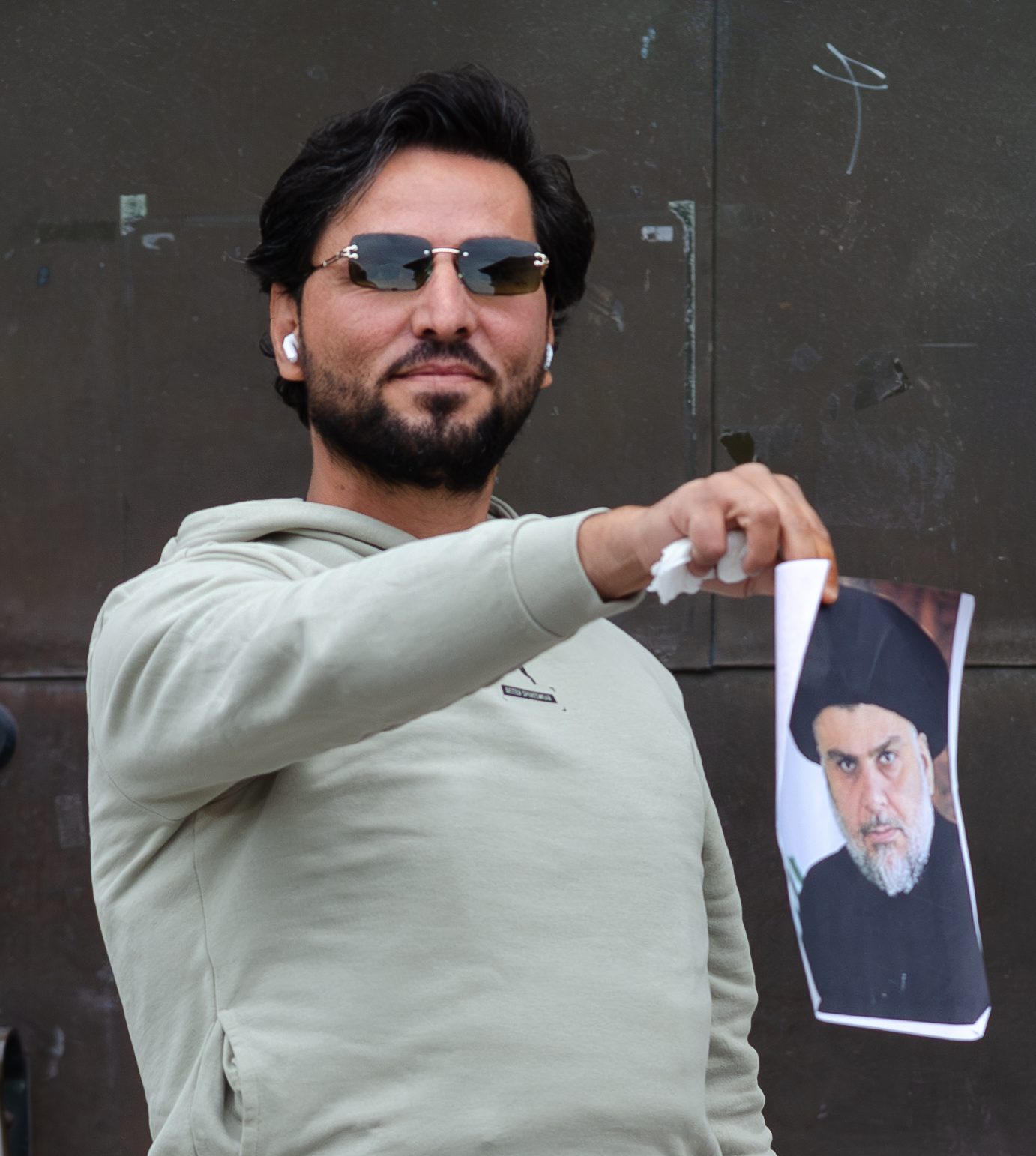
Momika in 2023, before his assassination

On 29 June, after the 2023 Quran burnings in Sweden, Muqtada al-Sadr released a statement declaring Sweden "hostile to Islam," a legal term denoting a nation as an abode of conflict (Dar al-Harb), causing protesters to storm and briefly occupy the Swedish embassy in Baghdad. Al-Sadr also claimed the 2023 Turkey–Syria earthquake was divine retribution for Turkey's perceived lax response to the burnings.

On 19 July, after another planned Quran-burning, the embassy was stormed again and set on fire by protesters, while Iraq expelled the Swedish ambassador, severed diplomatic ties with Sweden and banned Swedish businesses in Iraq.

The key organizer, Swedish-Iraqi refugee Salwan Momika, went on to mock al-Sadr and the Sadrist movement, burning a picture of the cleric. This stirred up great controversy among Sadr-supporters and Iraqi diaspora in Sweden.

Shortly after, Swedish police responded to reports of gunfire at an apartment in the Hovsjö district of Södertälje at approximately 23:11 local time (22:11 GMT) on 29 January 2025. According to eyewitness accounts, multiple shots were fired after someone was heard screaming. Momika was discovered with several gunshot wounds to the head and transported to a hospital, where authorities confirmed his death the following morning. Some have linked the Sadrist Movement to his assassination, due to the assailant hiding out in Iran, while others claim the events to be unrelated.
