= Musa al-Sadr =

Iranian-born Lebanese imam (1928–1978)

Sayyid Imam Musa al-Sadr
- موسى صدر الدین الصدر
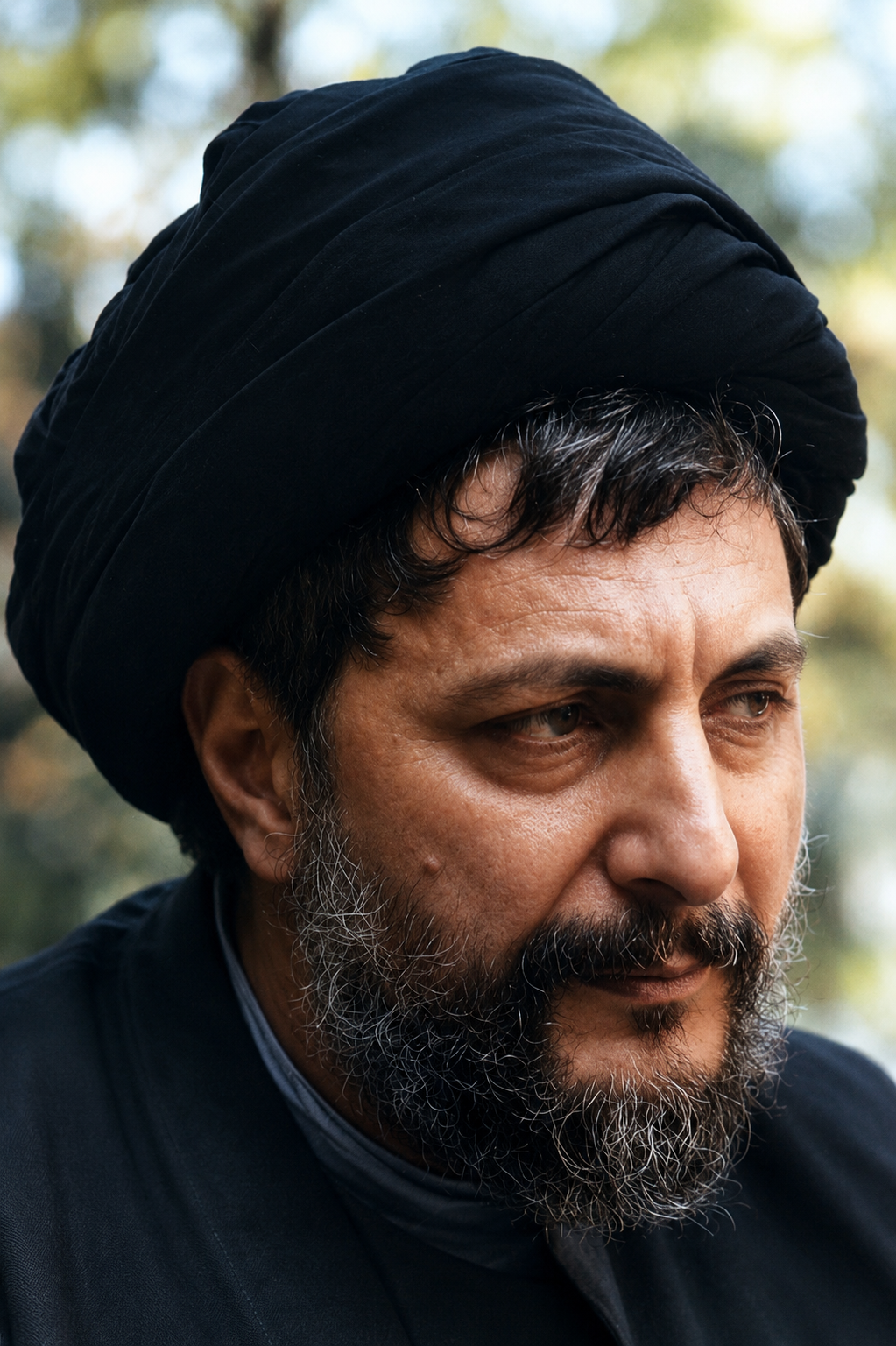

1st Leader of the Amal Movement
- In office 6 July 1974 – 31 August 1978
- Preceded by: Office established
- Succeeded by: Hussein el-Husseini

1st President of the Supreme Islamic Shia Council
- In office 23 May 1969 – 31 August 1978
- Preceded by: Office established
- Succeeded by: Mohd. Mehdi Shamseddine

Personal details
- Born: 4 June 1928 Qom, Imperial State of Iran
- Party: Amal Movement
- Other political affiliations: Supreme Islamic Shia Council
- Spouse: Parvin Khalili
- Parent: Sadr al-Din Sadr (father)
- Relatives: Ismail Sadr (grandfather); Haydar Sadr (uncle); Muhammad Sadr (cousin); Sadeq Tabatabaei (nephew); Zohreh Sadeghi (niece)
- Education: University of Tehran; Qom Seminary
- Profession: Cleric; politician
- Nicknames: السید المغیب; The Hidden Sayyid
- Disappeared: August 31, 1978 (aged 50); Tripoli, Libya
- Status: Missing for 48 years, 1 month and 3 days;

Musa Sadr al-Din al-Sadr (Arabic: موسى صدر الدین الصدر; Persian: موسی صدرالدین صدر; 4 June 1928 – disappeared 31 August 1978) was a Lebanese-Iranian Shia Muslim cleric, politician and revolutionary in Lebanon. He founded and revived many Lebanese Shia organisations, including schools, charities, and the Amal Movement.

Born in the Chaharmardan neighborhood in Qom, Iran, to an Iranian-Lebanese father and a Lebanese mother, he underwent both seminary and secular studies in Iran. He belongs to the Al-Sadr family from Jabal Amel in Lebanon, a branch of the Musawi family which traces its roots to Musa Ibn Jaafar, the seventh Shia Imam. Therefore, Musa al-Sadr is often styled with the honorific title Sayyid. He left Qom for Najaf to study theology and returned to Iran after the 1958 Iraqi coup d'état.

Some years later, al-Sadr went to Tyre, Lebanon as the emissary of Ayatollahs Borujerdi and Hakim. From Tyre, he published the periodical Maktabi Islam. Fouad Ajami called him a "towering figure in modern Shi'i political thought and praxis". He was noted to have given the Shia population of Lebanon "a sense of community". In 1974, al-Sadr co-founded the Amal Movement.

On 25 August 1978, Sadr and two companions, Sheikh Mohamad Yaacoub and Abbas Bader el-Dine, departed for Libya to meet with government officials at the invitation of Muammar Gaddafi. The three were last seen on 31 August. They were never heard from again. Many theories exist around the circumstances of al-Sadr's disappearance, none of which has been proven. His whereabouts remain unknown.

In September 2025, a BBC News investigative team reported that a body found in 2011 in a secret mortuary in Libya bore a strong resemblance to al-Sadr based on facial recognition analysis performed by Hassan Ugail at the University of Bradford. The BBC report presented testimonies claiming that al-Sadr was assassinated by the Gaddafi regime shortly after his arrival in Libya but this theory remains contested by al-Sadr's family and the Amal leadership.

== Early life and education ==
=== Family background ===
Al-Sadr came from a long line of clerics tracing their ancestry to Jabal Amel. His great-great-grandfather S. Salih b. Muhammad Sharafeddin, a high-ranking cleric, was born in Shhour, a village near Tyre, Lebanon. Following a frantic turn of events related to an anti-Ottoman uprising, he left for Najaf.

Sharafeddin's son, Sadreddin, left Najaf for Isfahan. He returned to Najaf shortly before his death in 1847. The youngest of his five sons, Ismail (as-Sadr), was born in Isfahan, in Qajar-ruled Iran, and eventually became a mujtahid. The second son of Ismail, also named Sadreddin, was born in Ottoman Iraq and also decided to settle permanently in Iran. He became Musa's father. While living in Iran, Sadreddin married a daughter of Ayatollah Hussein Tabatabaei Qomi, an Iranian religious leader. She would become Musa's mother.

=== Early life ===
Al-Sadr was born in the Cheharmardan neighborhood of Qom, Iran, on 4 June 1928. He attended Hayat Elementary School in Qom where he attended seminary classes informally; he started his official seminary education in 1941. After a while he started teaching other students "lower-level" courses. This coincided with the "liberalising of Iranian politics", the political climate of his time was secular, so that most religious scholars "felt politically and socially marginalised".

Al-Sadr started a "full secular education" alongside his seminary studies. He moved to Tehran, where he completed a degree in Islamic jurisprudence (fiqh) and political sciences from Tehran University and learned some English and French. He then returned to Qom to study theology and Islamic philosophy under Allamah Muhammad Husayn Tabatabai.

== In Iraq ==
Following the death of his father in 1953, al-Sadr left Qom for Najaf to study theology under Ayatollah Muhsin al-Hakim and Abul Qasim Khui. There he had teachers such as Ayatollah Hakim, Shaykh Morteza al Yasin, Ayatollah Abulqasim Khu'i, Shaykh Hossein Hilli, Shaykh Sadra Badkubahi, and others, some of whom became Marja after Ayatollah Borujerdi's death. Al-Sadr became a mujtahid in Najaf. In 1955 he traveled to Lebanon where he met Abd al-Hossein Sharafeddin. He had met him previously in 1936 when his family had hosted Abd al-Husayn in Iran. That same year he left Iran and returned to Najaf and, in the autumn of 1956, he married the daughter of Ayatollah Azizollah Khalili.

== Return to Iran ==
After the 1958 Iraqi coup d'état and the overthrow of the monarchy in Iraq, al-Sadr returned to Iran. There, he accepted the request of Ali Davani, who was sent by Ayatollah Shariatmadari, and became an editor of Darsha'i az maktab-e Islam, also known as Maktab-e Eslam, a journal published by the Hawza of Qom and endorsed by Ayatollah Borujerdi. His articles in this field were published as a book. He left the journal in December 1959 along with some of its original founders.

Al-Sadr also took part in devising a new scheme for Hawza called the "Preliminary plan for reforming the Hawza" (Persian: طرح مقدّماتی اصلاح حوزه, romanized: ţarḩe moqaddamātīye eşlāḩe ḩowzeh), which was then withdrawn, in cooperation with Mohammad Beheshti. In 1959, Sadr founded a private high school, which provided an alternative to the state educational system for "observant parents".

== Departure to Lebanon ==
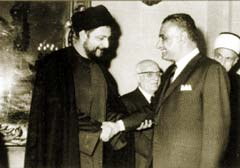
Musa Sadr with Gamal Abdel Nasser in the 1960s

Al-Sadr declined Ayatollah Broujerdi's request to go to Italy as his representative and instead left Qom for Najaf. There Ayatollah Muhsin al-Hakim urged him to accept an invitation from their relative Sayed Jafar Sharafeddin to become the leading Shi'a figure in the Southern Lebanese port city of Tyre, succeeding Jafar's father Abdul Hussein Sharif Al Din, who had died in 1957. Al-Sadr left Najaf for Tyre in late 1959, as the "emissary" of Ayatollah Broujerdi and Ayatollah Hakim. At the request of some clerics, he later made several trips to Iran, delivering several lectures such as "Islam is a Religion of Life" and "The World is Ready to Accept the Call of Islam." The latter included presenting his experiences in Lebanon and emphasising the need to work "towards the betterment of Muslims."

In 1967, al-Sadr traveled to West Africa to get acquainted with the Lebanese community and inspect its affairs and worked to link them to their homeland. He also met with Ivorian President Félix Houphouët-Boigny and Senegalese President Léopold Sédar Senghor and provided symbolic assistance to orphans in Senegal. Senghor praised the Imam's gesture, pointing out that he is following his activities with great interest, which had a great influence in spreading the feeling of love and faith among the citizens.

Al-Sadr, who became known as Imam Musa, became one of the most prominent advocates for the Shia population of Lebanon, a group that was both economically and politically disadvantaged.

"[Al-Sadr] worked tirelessly to improve the lot of his community – to give them a voice, to protect them from the ravages of war and inter communal strife," said Vali Nasr. Sadr impressed the Lebanese people "by providing practical assistance," regardless of their sect. He was seen as a moderate, demanding that the Maronite Christians relinquish some of their power, but pursuing ecumenism and peaceful relations between the groups.

In 1969, al-Sadr was appointed the first head of the Supreme Islamic Shia Council (SISC) in Lebanon, (Arabic: المجلس الإسلامي الشيعي الأعلى), an entity meant to give the Shia more say in government. For the next four years, al-Sadr engaged the leadership of Syrian ‘Alawīs in an attempt to unify their political power with that of the Twelver Shia. Recognition of the ‘Alawī as Shi'a coreligionists came in July 1973 when he and the ‘Alawī religious leadership successfully appointed an ‘Alawī as an official mufti to the Twelver community.

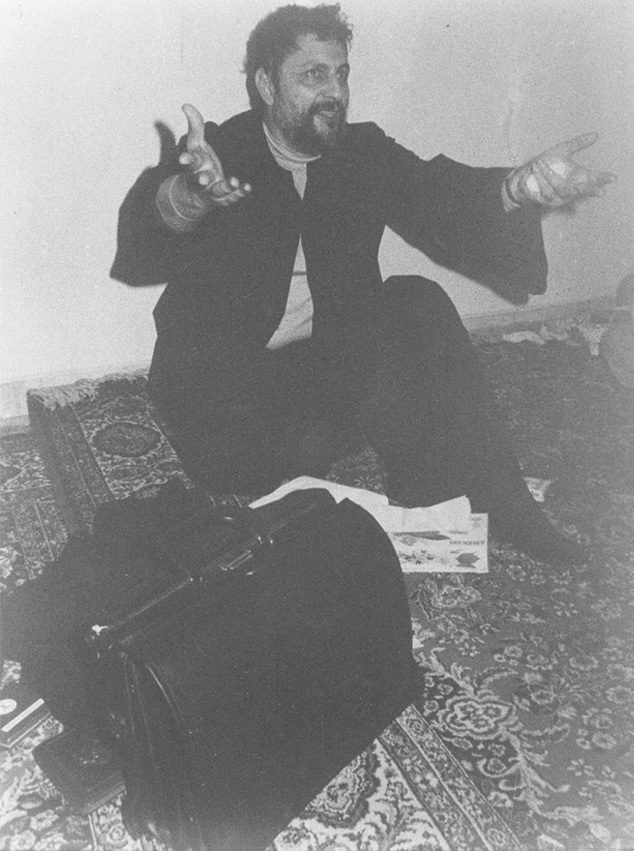
Three-day hunger strike by Musa Sadr in Safa mosque in Beirut in protest at the Lebanese Civil War

Al-Sadr revived the Jami'at al-Birr wal-Ihsan charity, founded by S. Salih b. Muhammad Sharafeddin, and gathered money for The Social Institute (al-Mu'assasa al-Ijtima'iyya), an orphanage in Tyre. In 1963, Sadr established a sewing school and nursery named The Girls' Home (Bayt al-Fatat). That same year, he established The Institute of Islamic Studies (Ma'had al-Dirasat al-Islamiyya). In 1964, Sadr started Burj al-Shimali Technical Institute, whose funding was provided by Shi'a benefactors, bank loans, and the Lebanese Ministry of Education. In 1974, he founded, with Hussein el-Husseini, the Movement of the Disinherited (Arabic: حركة المحرومين) to press for better economic and social conditions for the Shia. They established a number of schools and medical clinics throughout southern Lebanon. Sadr attempted to prevent the descent into violence that eventually led to the Lebanese Civil War by beginning a fast in a mosque in Beirut. There he was visited by Lebanese from all factions – both Muslim and Christian. Yasser Arafat and Syrian Foreign Minister Abd al-Halim Khaddam, also visited him. Formation of a national unity cabinet resulted from the meeting and al-Sadr's attempt to establish peace was a temporary success.

During the war, he aligned himself with the Lebanese National Movement and Movement of the Disinherited, and in cooperation with Mostafa Chamran developed an armed wing known as Afwāj al-Muqāwamat al-Lubnāniyyah (Arabic: أفواج المقاومة اللبنانية), better known as Amal (Arabic: أمل meaning "hope"), which assembled youth and educated generation of Husaynis and Mousawis families. Shia were the only major community without a militia group in the land of militias; Amal was created by Al-Sadr to protect Shia rights and interests.

In 1976, however, he withdrew his support after the Syrian invasion against Palestinian and leftist militias. He also actively cooperated with Mostafa Chamran, Sadegh Ghotbzadeh, and other Iranian Islamist activists during the civil war. Sadr and Chamran were involved in protests against the Shah out of Iran during the Islamic Revolution. According to Amal deputy Ali Kharis, "Musa Sadr and Chamran were the backbone of the Iranian revolution and how one can not speak of the Iranian revolution without mentioning these two people." In addition, al-Sadr developed ties between Hafez al-Assad, then Syrian president, and the opponents of Mohammad Reza Pahlavi, Shah of Iran.

== Personal life ==
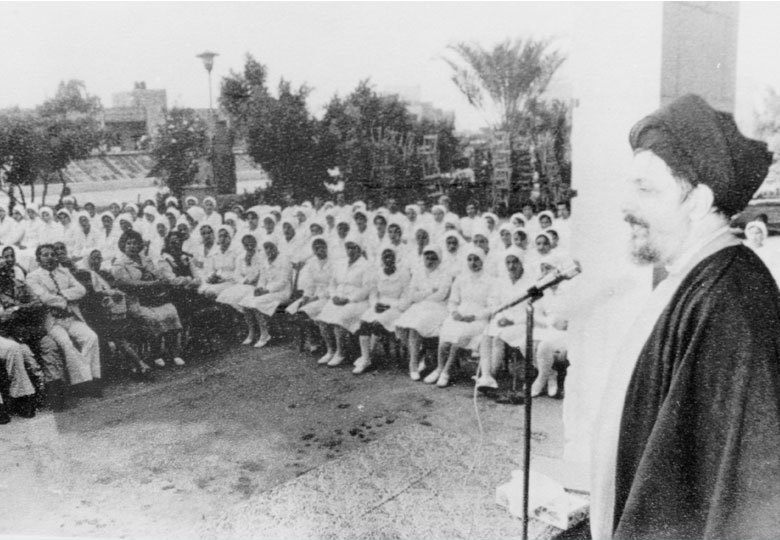
Imam Musa Sadr's speech at the graduation ceremony at nursing school Supreme Shiite Council in Lebanon, 1977

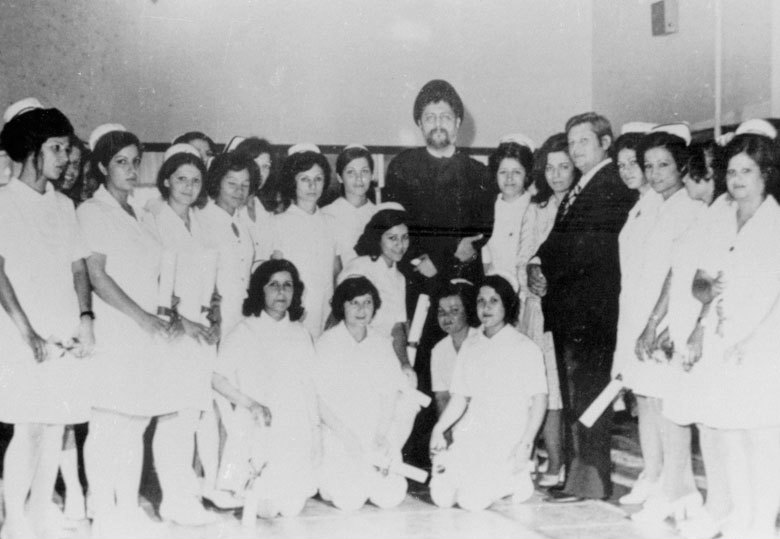
Attending the graduation ceremony at the Nursing School in Supreme Shiite Council in Lebanon, 1975

Al-Sadr maintained family relations with political leaders in Iran, Lebanon and Iraq. He is related to Sadeq Tabatabaei (his nephew), as well as Mohammad Khatami (his wife was a niece of al-Sadr), and Ayatollah Khomeini's son Ahmad Khomeini (his wife was another of al-Sadr's nieces). Sadr's son was married to Khomeini's granddaughter. His sister, Rabab al-Sadr, is a social activist who does charity work, and also a painter trained in Italy who earned a doctorate in philosophy, her paradigm being influenced by Søren Kierkegaard.'

=== Personality ===
Al-Sadr has been referred to by Fouad Ajami as a "towering figure in modern Shi'i political thought and praxis." According to him, even American diplomats effusively described Musa Sadr after meeting him. He supports his claim by referring to a cable sent home by George M. Godley, a U.S. ambassador to Lebanon: "He is without debate one of the most, if not the most, impressive individual I have met in Lebanon. . . . His charisma is obvious and his apparent sincerity is awe-inspiring". In Lebanon, he had garnered significant popularity "due to his good rapport with young people."

Standing at 1.98 m (6 ft 6 in), scholar Fouad Ajami describes Sadr's charisma and magnetism as such:

Lebanon has long been a country finicky about the looks, the aura, al-haiba of a leader. The Shia in particular have been noted to be a people of some vanity. In the Shia tradition, the Imams were not only morally infallible men (an Imam was said to be masum, not subject to error), but also physically perfect beings. A blind man or a lame man would not have been accepted as an Imam. Musa al Sadr, a handsome man of striking looks, was true to his people's fantasy of what a man of piety and distinction and high birth slated for bigger things should look like. He was, in addition, a dazzling speaker in a culture that exalted the spoken word and those who could express in classical Arabic what was on the minds of others.

== Disappearance ==
On 25 August 1978, al-Sadr and two companions, Sheikh Mohamad Yaacoub and journalist Abbas Bader el-Dine, departed for Libya to meet with government officials at the invitation of Muammar Gaddafi. The three were last seen on 31 August. They were never heard from again.

It is widely believed, at least by Lebanese Shia Muslims, that Gaddafi ordered Sadr's killing, but differing motivations exist. Libya has consistently denied responsibility, claiming that al-Sadr and his companions left Libya for Italy. Supporters of the missing cleric, however, pointed out that Sadr's baggage was found in a Tripoli hotel and there was no evidence of his arrival in Rome. Airlines could not confirm that Sadr had ever flown to Italy from Libya.

Al-Sadr's son claimed that he remains secretly in jail in Libya but did not provide proof. Lebanese Parliament Speaker Nabih Berri claimed that the Libyan regime, and particularly the Libyan leader, was responsible for the disappearance of al-Sadr, as London-based Asharq Al-Awsat, a Saudi-run pan-Arab daily, reported on 27 August 2006.

According to Iranian General Mansour Qadar, the head of Syrian security, Rifaat al-Assad told the Iranian ambassador to Syria that Gaddafi planned to kill Sadr. On 27 August 2008, Gaddafi was indicted by the government of Lebanon for Sadr's disappearance. Following the fall of the Gaddafi regime, Lebanon and Iran appealed to the Libyan rebels to investigate the fate of al-Sadr.

Lebanese political analyst Roula Talj has said that Gaddafi's son, Saif al-Islam Gaddafi, told her that Sadr and his aides never left Libya. She noted, however, that Saif al-Islam stopped short of "acknowledging that Imam Musa al-Sadr is still alive". She added, "based on my own analysis and people's reactions to this, I believe he is still alive". According to a representative of Libya's National Transitional Council in Cairo, Gaddafi murdered al-Sadr after discussions about Shia beliefs. Al-Sadr accused him of being unaware of Islamic teachings and of the Islamic branches of Shia and Sunni. According to other sources, Gaddafi had al-Sadr and his companions murdered at the request of Palestinian leader Yasser Arafat. At the time, the Shias and the Palestinians were involved in armed clashes in Southern Lebanon.

According to several sources, there was tension between al-Sadr and Khomeini as al-Sadr did not recognize him as the supreme religious authority of the Shiite world. The alleged rivalry between the two is what caused Gaddafi to eliminate al-Sadr at the request of Ayatollah Ruhollah Khomeini, who regarded al-Sadr as a potential rival. Gaddafi later supported Khomeini in the Iran-Iraq War.

According to a former member of the Libyan intelligence, al-Sadr was beaten to death for daring to challenge Gaddafi at his house on matters of theology. In an interview with Al Aan TV, Ahmed Ramadan, an influential figure in the Gaddafi regime and an eyewitness to the meeting between al-Sadr and Gaddafi, claimed that the meeting lasted for two and a half hours and ended with Gaddafi saying "take him". Ramadan also named three officials who he believes were responsible for the death of al-Sadr. In 2011, Abdel Monem al-Houni claimed that al-Sadr's body was sent to Sabha in Gaddafi's private jet and buried there. The plane was flown by Houni's cousin, Najieddine Yazigi, who was later murdered to preserve the secret.

In 2021, Muqtada al-Sadr, al-Sadr's cousin and leader of the Sadrist Movement in Iraq, announced that a committee has been formed to investigate the fate of Musa Sadr. In September 2025 the BBC World Service reported on the possible discovery and identification of al-Sadr's body in Libya by Lebanese-Swedish journalist Kassem Hamadé, who had been tipped off about a secret morgue in Tripoli while reporting on the 2011 Libyan Revolution. The bodies in the morgue were believed to have been preserved for 20–30 years. Upon investigating, Hamadé took a photograph of the corpse of an unusually large, bearded man, who bore signs of execution. Facial recognition analysis performed using the photograph by Hussain Ugail of the University of Bradford revealed a match with al-Sadr's confirmed appearance, indicating that the body likely belonged to al-Sadr himself or a close relative. Hamadé further disclosed that he had taken a sample of the corpse's hair for DNA analysis and sent it to the Lebanese government but the file had been declared lost due to "technical reasons".

The BBC documentary also presented footage of an interview of the former Libyan minister of justice, Mustafa Abdel Jalil, who stated that al-Sadr had been murdered in a Libyan jail and that Libyan officials had forged documents to make it appear as if al-Sadr had left Libya for Italy. Jalil also stated that the order to kill al-Sadr was given by Gaddafi. The BBC report further explores possibilities that al-Sadr had been murdered by the Gaddafi regime at the behest of either the operatives of the Iranian Shia leader Ayatollah Ruhollah Khomeini or Yasir Arafat's PLO, both of whom saw the moderate al-Sadr as a threat to their power. Al-Sadr's family representatives and the Amal leadership rejected the BBC's findings but agreed to take Hamadé's evidence into consideration in their own investigation. On 17 October 2025, a Lebanese court ordered the release on bail of Muammar Gaddafi's son, Hannibal Gaddafi, who had been detained in Lebanon since 2015 on charges related to al-Sadr's disappearance.

== Legacy ==
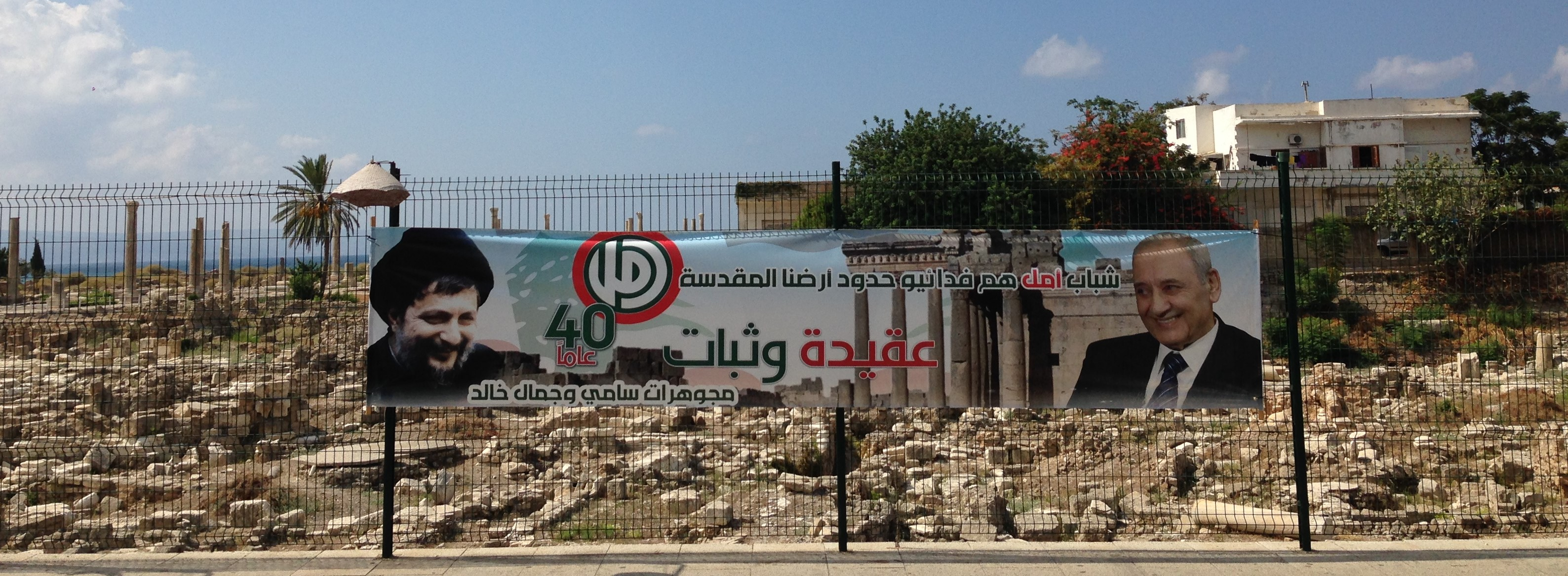
Banner in Tyre, commemorating the 40th anniversary of Sadr's disappearance

Al-Sadr is still regarded as an important political and spiritual leader by the Shia Lebanese community. His status only grew after his disappearance in August 1978, and today his legacy is revered by both Amal and Hezbollah followers. In the eyes of many, he became a martyr and a "vanished imam". A tribute to his continuing popularity is that it is popular in parts of Lebanon to mimic his Persian accent. According to Professor Seyyed Hossein Nasr,

His great political influence and fame was enough for people to not consider his philosophical attitude, although he was a well-trained follower of long living intellectual tradition of Islamic Philosophy.

== Works ==
Al-Sadr wrote an introduction to Henry Corbin's History of Islamic Philosophy. Al-Sadr's paper Islam, Humanity and Human Values was published by Ahlul Bayt World Assembly. Unity of the Islamic Schools of Thought According to Imam Musa Sadr includes a biography and an English adaptation of one of his books, Imam Musa Sadr: surush-e wahdat, Majma’ Jahani-ye Taqrib-e Madhahib-e Islami, 2004.

== Institutions ==
- Imam Moussa Al Sadr Center for Research & Studies - Beirut, Lebanon
- Sadr Foundation - Tyre, Lebanon
- Sadr Foundation - Dearborn, Michigan, United States

== See also ==
- Lebanese people in Iran
- List of people who disappeared
- List of Shi'a Muslim scholars of Islam
- Modern Islamic philosophy
- Mohammad Baqir Sadr
- Mohammad Sadeq Sadr
