= Mohammed al-Sadr =

Iraqi Twelver Shi'a cleric (1943–1999)

Grand Ayatollah Sayyid Shahid Mohammed al-Sadr
- سید مُحمّد الصدر
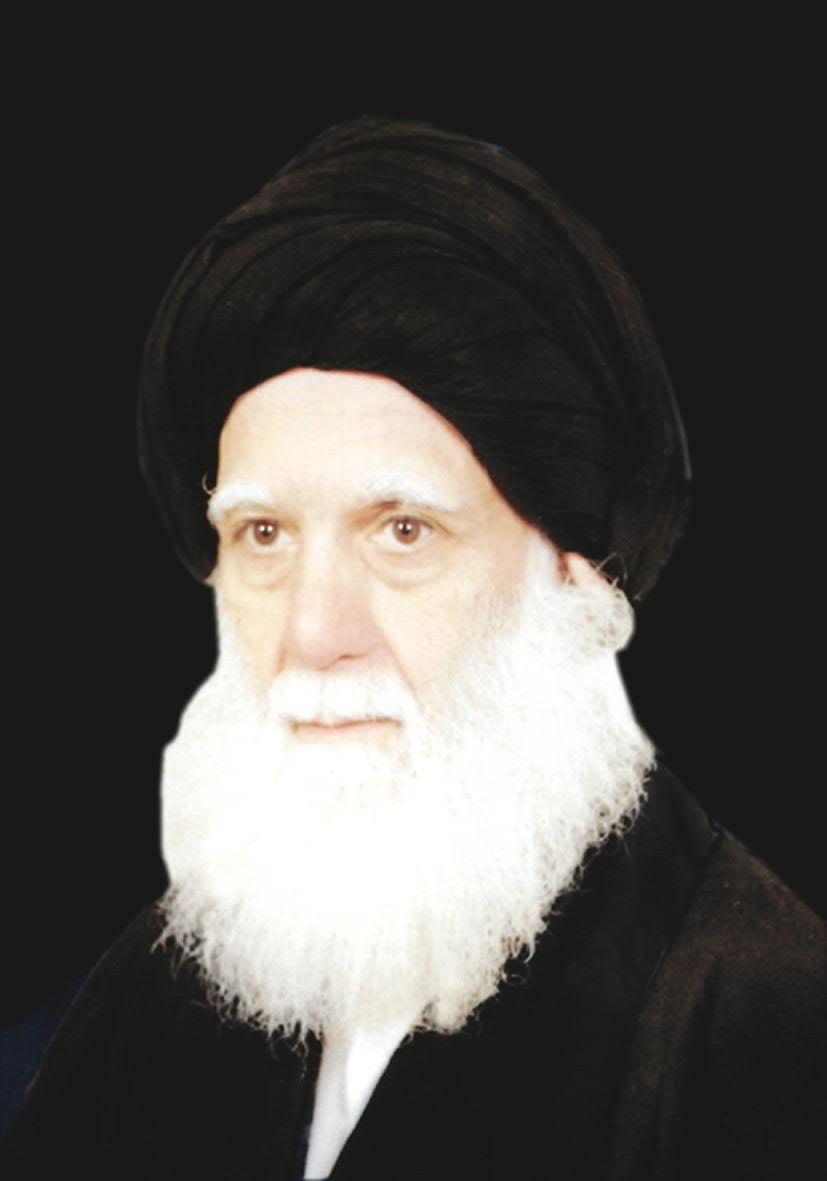
- Title: Grand Ayatollah

Personal life
- Born: 23 March 1943 al-Kazimiya, Baghdad, Kingdom of Iraq
- Died: 19 February 1999 (aged 55) Najaf, Ba'athist Iraq
- Cause of death: Assassination

Religious life
- Religion: Islam
- Denomination: Twelver Shīʿā
- Jurisprudence: Usuli

Muslim leader
- Based in: Najaf, Iraq
- Post: Grand Ayatollah
- Predecessor: Mohammad Baqir al-Sadr
- Successor: Muqtada al-Sadr

Grand Ayatollah Sayyid Mohammed al-Sadr (Arabic: محمّد الصدر; born 23 March 1943 – 19 February 1999) was a prominent Iraqi Twelver Shiite cleric and marja'. He called for government reform and the release of detained Shia leaders during the rule of Saddam Hussein. The growth of his popularity, often referred to as the followers of the local Hawza, also put him in competition with other Shi'a leaders, including Mohammed Baqir al-Hakim who was exiled in Iran.

== Biography ==
Al-Sadr was born to Mohammed al-Sadr (1906–1986), a grandson of Ismail al-Sadr, the patriarch of the Lebanese–Iraqi al-Sadr family. He was also a first cousin of Muhammad Baqir al-Sadr and Amina al-Sadr.

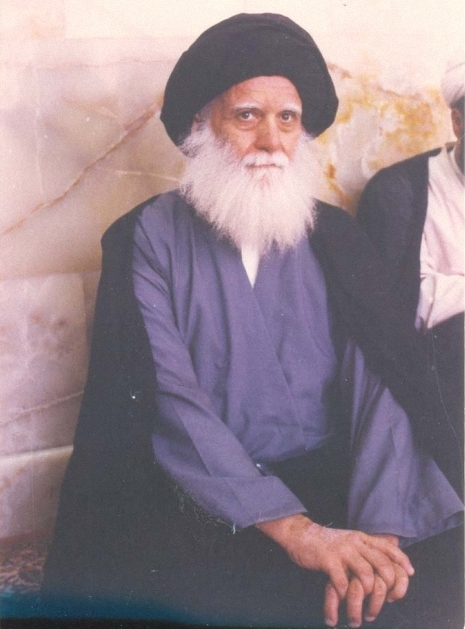
Al-Sadr seated in the Great Mosque of Kufa.

Following the Gulf War, Shi'a communities in southern Iraq rose in open rebellion against the government of Saddam Hussein. Several provinces temporarily expelled Ba'athist authorities, leading to a fragmented Shi'a leadership landscape. Religious authority in Iraq became divided primarily between Ayatollah Ali al-Sistani and Mohammed Sadiq al-Sadr.

Based in Baghdad, al-Sadr appealed particularly to younger and economically marginalized Shi'a populations from southern Iraq. Supporters traveled to the capital to join his movement, strengthening his position within the Shi'a religious establishment. During this period, al-Sadr established an informal network of followers and emerged as an increasingly influential figure in Iraqi religious and political life.

Due to longstanding repression of Shi'a communities and the loyalty of local residents, the Ba'athist government struggled to exert effective control over Revolution Township at the neighborhood level. This limited state authority contributed to the consolidation of al-Sadr's influence in the area, which was later renamed Sadr City.

As his influence expanded throughout the 1990s—particularly after 1993—al-Sadr became increasingly active in public affairs. After attaining greater recognition as a marjaʿ, he openly challenged Saddam Hussein's authority. He mobilized residents of Sadr City and surrounding tribal areas by providing social and religious services largely absent under the state. In response, the Iraqi government intensified its repression of Shi'a leaders in the late 1990s in an effort to reassert control.

== Assassination ==
Sometime before his death, al-Sadr was warned by Saddam not to incite any more violence. In defiance, al-Sadr wore his death shroud to his final Friday sermon. He was later killed leaving the mosque in the Iraqi city of Najaf along with two of his sons as they drove through the town. Their car was ambushed by men, and both his sons were killed by gunfire while he was severely injured. He died an hour later in the hospital. The Iraqi government denied any involvement, with an Iraqi Intelligence Service report stating that the death was a result of a Hawza dispute among senior clerics. Saddam Hussein also insisted that he had played no role in the assassination. Despite this, Shi'as in Iraq were mistrustful of the Ba'athist government and suspected the Iraqi Baathist government of being involved in, if not directly responsible for, their murders. Anger at, among other things, the government's alleged involvement in Sadr's death helped spark the 1999 Shia uprising in Iraq.

== Legacy ==
Following the fall of Baghdad in 2003, the majority-Shi'a suburb of Revolution City (Saddam City or Al-Thawraa) was officially renamed to Sadr City in memory of him. Al-Sadr's son, Muqtada al-Sadr, is currently the leader of the Sadrist movement and bases his legitimacy upon his relationship with his father. He led a guerrilla uprising against Coalition forces and the new Iraqi government as part of the Iraqi Insurgency between 2004 and 2008, under the name of the Mahdi Army (Jaysh al–Mahdi), that was established in 2003.

== Works ==
- Al-Islam wal-Mithaq al-Alimiyah lil-Huquq al-Insan (Islam and the International Covenant on Human Rights)
- Ma Wara al-Fiqh (What is behind Jurisprudence)
- Fiqh al-Asha'ir (Tribal Jurisprudence)

== See also ==
- Muhammad Baqir al-Sadr
- Kamal alHaydari
- Mohammad Yaqoobi
- Ismail al-Sadr
- Haydar al-Sadr
- Sadr al-Din al-Sadr
- Musa al-Sadr
- List of Shi'a Muslim scholars of Islam
