= Haydar al-Sadr =

Iraqi Grand Ayatollah (1891–1937)

Ayatollah Haydar al-Sadr (Arabic: حيدر الصدر; 1891–1937) was born in Samarra, Iraq. His father, Ismail as-Sadr (d. 1920) was a Grand Ayatollah and the first to be use the as-Sadr surname, which came to be associated with a long line of religious scholarship within Shia Islam. Haydar and the as-Sadr family are also considered as Sayyid, or those who can trace their lineage back to Muhammad (d. 632). The family's lineage is traced through Imam Jafar al-Sadiq and his son Imam Musa al-Kazim the sixth and seventh Shia Imams respectively. This direct and meticulously documented lineage is unprecedented even among the illustrious families in the Islamic world who claim such lineage. The Shia Muslims consider themselves the followers of Muhammad's bloodline, thus a great deal of respect and reverence is paid to the Sayyids throughout society. Some of the well known relatives of Haydar al-Sadr include his brother, Sadr al-Din Sadr (d. 1954), his nephew Moussa as-Sadr and another nephew Mohammad Sadeq al-Sadr.

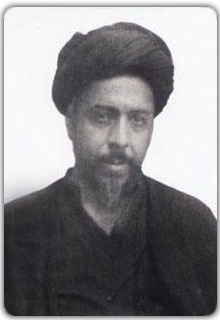
Ayatollah al-Sayyid Haydar al-Sadr

Haydar was considered a grand marja at-taqlid (supreme religious authority) of his time. A marja' at-taqlīd, literally, means "reference point for emulation", or one who through his learning and probity is qualified to be followed in all points of religious practice and Islamic law by the generality of Shi'is. He died in Kazimain, Iraq in 1937 leaving three children: Isma'il, Mohammad Baqir as-Sadr (d. 1980) and Aminah (known as Bint al-Hoda).

== See also ==
- Ismail al-Sadr
- Bint al-Huda
- Sadr al-Din al-Sadr
- Musa al-Sadr
- Muhammad Baqir al-Sadr
- Muhammad Sadiq al-Sadr
- Muhammad Muhammad Sadiq al-Sadr
- List of Shi'a Muslim scholars of Islam
