= Amina al-Sadr =

Iraqi educator and political activist (1938–1980)

Sayyida Allawiya Amina Al-Sadr
- Born: 1937; Kazimiyah, Kingdom of Iraq
- Died: 1980 (aged 42–43); Baghdad, Ba'athist Iraq
- Cause of death: Execution by hanging
- Father: Haydar al-Sadr
- Relatives: Muhammad Baqir al-Sadr (brother)

Amina Haydar al-Sadr (Arabic: آمنة حيدر الصدر; 1937 – 1980), known as Bint al-Huda al-Sadr (بنت الهدى الصدر), was an Iraqi educator and political activist who was executed by Saddam Hussein's regime along with her brother, Ayatullah Sayyid Mohammad Baqir al-Sadr, in 1980.

== Life and career ==
Aminah Haidar al-Sadr was born in 1937 in Kazimiyah, Baghdad where she would eventually establish several religious schools for girls. Bint al-Huda played a significant role in creating Islamic awareness among the Muslim women of Iraq. She was in her twenties when she began writing articles in al-Adwaa, an Islamic magazine printed by the religious intellectuals of Najaf, Iraq, in 1959. She was also well known for her participation in the Safar Uprising in 1977. Bint al-Huda grew up with a serious love of learning. She soon became aware of what she perceived to be the Muslim women's sufferings and the great disasters which were damaging Islamic ideology in her country.

In 1980, she and her brother, the religious leader Ayatollah Sayyid Mohammad Baqir al-Sadr, were arrested, brutally tortured and later executed by Saddam Hussein's regime due to their leading role in the opposition to the regime. It has been reported that Saddam Hussein himself killed them. The Baathists delivered the bodies of Baqir al-Sadr and Bint al-Huda to their cousin Sayyid Mohammad al-Sadr, and were buried in the Wadi-us-Salaam graveyard in the holy city of Najaf the same night. In 2024, Saadoun Sabri Jamil Jumaa al-Qaisi, a senior security official during Saddam's regime, was arrested in Erbil for overseeing Al-Sadr's detention and killing. He was subsequently convicted for the Al-Sadr killings and executed in 2026.

== Works ==
- A Word And A Call - first book published in the 1960s
- Virtue Triumphs
- A Lady With The Prophet
- Two Women And A Man - a story about education and guidance
- Conflict of reality
- The Searcher Of Truth - published in 1979
- Memories On The Hills of Mecca - written after her pilgrimage Ito Mecca in 1973
- A Meeting At The Hospital
- The Lost Aunt
- Had I But Known
- The Game
- The Heroic Muslim Women
- Inner Debate
- The Lost Diary
- Choosing A Wife
- Determination
- Spiritual Journey
- A Bad Bargain
- The Gift
- A Visit To The Bride
- Inner Debate
- The Last Days
- Hard Times
- A New Start
- The Last Hours
- Struggling With Conflict
- Idleness
- Ingratitude
- Firm Stand
- The Dangerous Game
- A Muslim Student's Diary

== See also ==
- Nosrat Amin
- Zohreh Sefati
- Amina Bint al-Majlisi
