= Khoei (disambiguation) =

Khoei may refer to one of these:

- Abu al-Qasim al-Khoei, one of the most influential Twelver Shia Islamic scholars (marja).
- Abdul-Majid al-Khoei, a Twelver Shia cleric and the son of Ayatollah Al-Udhma Sayyid Abul Qasim al-Khoei.
- Imam Al-Khoei Benevolent Foundation, an organization created by Abul-Qassim Khoei, a Grand Ayatollah.
- Mohammad Taqi al-Khoei, brother of Abdul Majid al-Khoei and son of Ayatollah Al-Udhma Sayyid Abul Qasim al-Khoei.
