= Abdul Aziz al-Hakim =

66th prime minister of Iraq

Abdul-Aziz al-Hakim سيد عبدالعزيز الحكيم
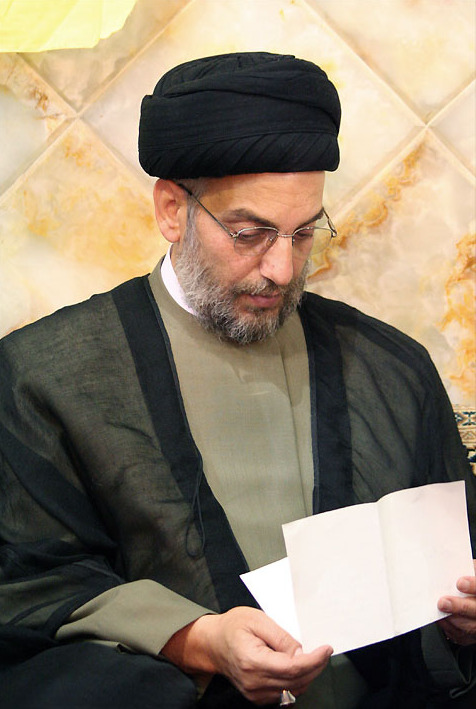

President of the Governing Council of Iraq
- In office 1 December 2003 – 31 December 2003
- Preceded by: Jalal Talabani
- Succeeded by: Adnan Pachachi

Personal details
- Born: 1 January 1952 Najaf, Kingdom of Iraq
- Died: 26 August 2009 (aged 57) Tehran, Iran
- Party: United Iraqi Alliance; Supreme Islamic Council
- Relations: Ammar al-Hakim (son)

Ayatollah Abdul Aziz al-Hakim (/ˈɑːbdʊl əˈziːz æl həˈkiːm/ AHB-duul ə-ZEEZ al hə-KEEM; Arabic: سید عبد العزيز الحكيم; 1952 – 26 August 2009) was an Iraqi theologian, politician and a former leader of the Islamic Supreme Council of Iraq. He also served as the President of the Governing Council of Iraq (40th Prime Minister of Iraq)

He was a member of the United States-appointed Iraqi Governing Council and served as its president in December 2003. Brother of the Shia leader Mohammed Baqir al-Hakim, he succeeded him as leader of the Supreme Council for the Islamic Revolution in Iraq when Mohammed Baqir was assassinated in August 2003 in Najaf.

== Biography ==
=== Family tree ===
Sayyid Abdul Aziz al-Hakim was a member of the Hakim family of Shiite scholars.

=== Early life ===
He was born in 1952, the son of Grand Ayatollah Muhsin Al-Hakim. He was raised in Najaf and then received his theological education through the religious school there, known as the Hawza. He was married to the daughter of Mohammed Hadi al-Sadr and he was the father of two girls and two boys. His son Muhsin Abdul Aziz al-Hakim was a political adviser to him, and his other son Ammar al-Hakim became the Secretary General of Al-Mihrab Martyr Foundation. Seven of Abdul Aziz al-Hakim's brothers were killed, six of them on the orders of Saddam Hussein.

== Iran and SCIRI ==
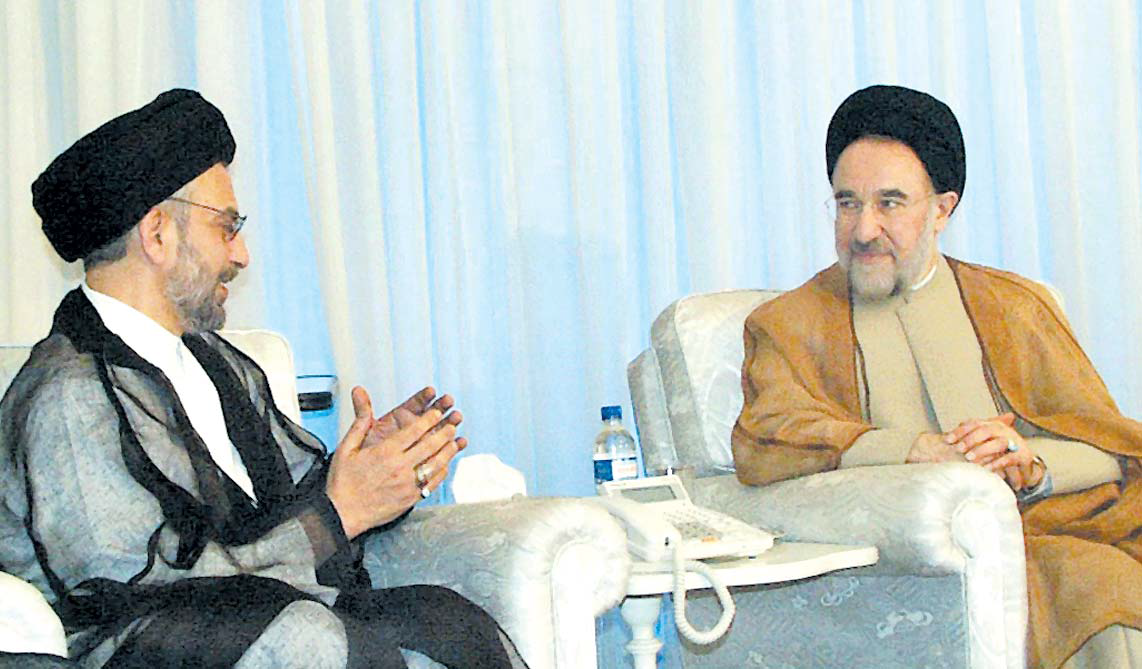
Abdul Aziz al-Hakim and Iranian President Mohammad Khatami, 6 October 2003, Tehran

Al-Hakim played a leading role in the 'Safar Intifada' in Iraq in 1977 and was imprisoned by the Iraqi government in 1972, 1977 and 1979. He went into exile in Iran in 1980, where he was a founding member in 1982 of Supreme Council for the Islamic Revolution in Iraq (SCIRI), a group set up under Iran's auspices to bring Islamic revolution to Iraq. The group was led by Al-Hakim's brother, Mohammed Baqir al-Hakim. SCIRI would later change its name to the Islamic Supreme Council of Iraq.

=== Badr Brigades ===
Within SCIRI, al-Hakim headed its military wing, the Badr Brigades. Badr was officered by Iranians and its troops fought on Iran's side during the Iran–Iraq War.

== Iraq ==
With the removal of Saddam Hussein from power in 2003 with the US-led invasion, Al-Hakim and SCIRI returned to Iraq where they have been major players in Iraq's politics. SCIRI's leader, Mohammed Baqir Al-Hakim, was assassinated on 29 August 2003, when a massive car bomb exploded as he left the Imam Ali Mosque in Najaf. Following the murder, Abdul Aziz Al-Hakim became SCIRI's head.

Al-Hakim was the top candidate listed for the United Iraqi Coalition during the first Iraqi legislative election of January 2005 but did not seek a government post because the Alliance had decided not to include theologians in the government.

=== Interior Ministry ===
Under Abdul Aziz Al-Hakim, SCIRI controlled Iraq's Interior Ministry. In 2006 according to the United Nations human rights chief in Iraq, John Pace, said that every month hundreds of Iraqis were being tortured to death or executed by the Interior Ministry under SCIRI's control. According to a 2006 report by the Independent newspaper: 'Mr Pace said the Ministry of the Interior was "acting as a rogue element within the government". It is controlled by the main Shia party, the Supreme Council for Islamic Revolution in Iraq (Sciri); the Interior Minister, Bayan Jabr, is a former leader of Sciri's Badr Brigade militia, which is one of the main groups accused of carrying out sectarian killings. Another is the Mehdi Army of the young cleric Moqtada al-Sadr, who is part of the Shia coalition seeking to form a government after winning the mid-December election. Many of the 110,000 policemen and police commandos under the ministry's control are suspected of being former members of the Badr Brigade. Not only counter-insurgency units such as the Wolf Brigade, the Scorpions and the Tigers, but the commandos and even the highway patrol police have been accused of acting as death squads.

The paramilitary commandos, dressed in garish camouflage uniforms and driving around in pick-up trucks, are dreaded in Sunni neighbourhoods. People whom they have openly arrested have frequently been found dead several days later, with their bodies bearing obvious marks of torture.

=== U.S. visits ===
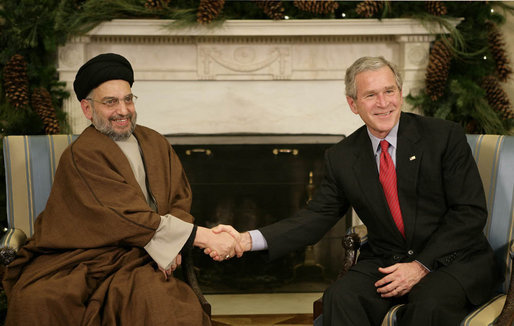
al-Hakim meeting George W. Bush

On 4 December 2006, al-Hakim met with George W. Bush and made a commitment to help end violence,

We have gone a long way to establish a democratic and pluralistic society in Iraq ... We ... [believe in] a government that deals and will deal with all the sources of terrorism regardless where they come from.

Al-Hakim also gave his assessment of the situation in Iraq:

The Iraqi situation has been subjected to a great deal of defamation, and the true picture is not being presented in order to show a dark side of what's happening in Iraq. We see the attempts to defame and distort the situation in Iraq not taking into consideration the democratic steps that that country has taken, writing the constitution and establishing a state that depends heavily on the constitution, that it is unified and that it is strong. There are attempts to show the sectarian strife in an attempt to weaken the position in Iraq.

On 5 December 2006, on behalf of The Catholic University of America and American University's Center for Global Peace, he spoke at the Pope John Paul II Cultural Center. The title of his speech was "Freedom and Tolerance in Shi'a Islam and the Future of Iraq". Notable guests at this event included Archbishop Donald Wuerl of Washington, D.C., and Rabbi Professor Ephraim Isaac from the Institute of Semitic Studies in Princeton, New Jersey.

== Illness and death ==
On 16 May 2007 he flew to Houston for medical treatment. Reportedly he had lung cancer. On 20 May 2007, Hakim left the U.S. for Iran, in order to receive chemotherapy treatment. On 26 August 2009, Abdel Aziz al-Hakim died of lung cancer in a Tehran hospital. He was buried in Najaf on 29 August, on the same day and month as his brother, who was killed exactly six years earlier. Hassan Nasrallah, the former leader of Shia Lebanese group Hezbollah, had issued an emotional statement regarding the death of Abdul-Aziz Al-Hakim. The statement spoke of the "struggle" of Al-Hakim to "rescue" and "uplift the Iraqi people." This drew criticism and calls of sectarianism from political commentator Asad Abukhalil due to the role of Abdul Aziz Al Hakim in the US occupation of Iraq.

== References and notes ==
Party political offices
Preceded by Mohammad Baqir al-Hakim	Leader of the Islamic Supreme Council; 2003–2009	Succeeded by Ammar al-Hakim
Political offices
Preceded by Jalal Talabani	President of the Governing Council of Iraq; 2003	Succeeded by Adnan Pachachi
