= Tabatabaei =

Tabatabaei (Arabic: طباطبائي, Ṭabāṭabāʾī; Persian: طباطبایی, Ṭabâṭabâyī) (also spelled Tabatabai, Tabatabaee, Tabatabaie, Tabatabaeyan) is a surname denoting descent from someone called Ṭabāṭabā, in particular Ibrahim bin Ismail al-Dibaj (grandson of Hasan ibn Hasan), a descendant of Ali, the fourth and last of the Rashidun caliphs. It is one of many families of Sayyids in Shia Islam, predominant in Iran, but also in Iraq, Lebanon, Kuwait and Pakistan.

== People ==
(by order of year of birth)

- Mirza Sayyed Mohammad Tabatabai (1842–1920), Iranian leader of the Iranian Constitutional Revolution
- Ali Haider Tabatabai (1854–1933), Indian poet and translator
- Ali Tabatabaei (1869–1947), Iranian ayatollah commonly known as al-Qadi Tabatabai, who was famous for his high level of Irfan
- Hossein Borujerdi (1875–1961), Iranian grand ayatollah
- Zia ol Din Tabatabaee (1888–1969), Iranian politician
- Muhsin al-Hakim (1889–1970), Iraqi Marja
- Muhammad Husayn Tabataba'i (1903–1981), Iranian philosopher, commonly known as Allameh Tabatabai
- Hassan Tabatabaei Qomi (1912–2007), Iranian cleric who has repeatedly criticized the velayat-e faqih
- Taqi Tabatabaei Qomi (1923-2016), Iranian Twelver Shi'a Marja
- Ali Akbar Tabatabaei (1930–1980), Iranian exiled politician, murdered in America
- Jazeh Tabatabai (1931–2008), Iranian painter, poet, and sculptor
- Mehdi Tabatabaei (1936–2018), Iranian Shia cleric and conservative politician. Served as a member of the Parliament of Iran
- Sadeq Tabatabaei (1943–2015), Iranian politician, former Deputy Prime Minister
- Mohammad Ali Tabatabaei Hassani (1945–2017), Iraqi Twelver Shi'a Marja
- Waleed Al-Tabtabaie (born 1964), Member of the Kuwaiti National Assembly
- Javad Tabatabai (born 1964), Iranian philosopher
- Jasmin Tabatabai (born 1967), German-Iranian singer, songwriter and actress
- Haytham Ali Tabatabai (1968–2025), Lebanese Hezbollah senior commander
- Hadi Tabatabaei (born 1973), Iranian footballer
- Ali Tabatabaee (born 1973), American punk musician, member and lead singer of Zebrahead
- John Tabatabai, Welsh poker player
- Ali Tabatabaei (actor) (1983–2015), Iranian film and television
- Mohammad Hossein Tabatabai (born 1991), Iranian who could recite the entire Koran at age seven
- Amin Tabatabaei (born 2001), Iranian chess grandmaster
- Sayyid Ja'far 'Ali al-Tabataba'i, founder of the Najafi Nawab dynasty of Murshidabad, Bengal
- Nawabs of Murshidabad, ruling dynasty of Bengal in the 18th-century until the 20th-century

== Institutions and buildings ==
- Tabatabai House in Kashan, Iran
- Allameh Tabataba'i University, public university in Tehran, Iran
- Allameh Tabatabaei High School, high school in Tehran, Iran

== See also ==
- Sayyid
- Tabataba (film), 1988 African film
