= Hakim family =

- Current region: Najaf, Iraq
- Members: see below
- Traditions: Twelver Shia

The Hakim family is a prominent family of Shiite Islam scholars from Najaf, Iraq who claim descent from the Alids. They belong to a Tabatabaei branch whose scholarly involvement has revolved around Iraq for centuries. The family faced extensive persecution and executions at the hand of Saddam Hussein's government, yet it maintains a prominent role in Iraq and the Middle East.

== Members ==
=== First generation ===
- Grand Ayatollah Muhsin al-Hakim (1889–1970) (Arabic: أية الله العظمى سيد محسن الطباطبائ الحكيم) was born into a family, the Tabatabaei, renowned for its scholarship. He was always in the forefront to defend Islam and Muslims. He became the sole Marja' in 1961 after the death of the Grand Ayatollah Sayyid Husayn Borujerdi. His son Abdul Aziz al-Hakim was the leader of SIIC, the largest political party in Iraq. Seven of Muhsin al-Hakim's sons were killed, six of them on the orders of Saddam Hussein.
- Ayatollah Sayyid Ahmad al-Hakim

=== Second generation ===
- Sayyid Abdul Aziz al-Hakim (1953 – 26 August 2009; /ˈɑːbdʊl əˈziːz æl həˈkiːm/ AHB-duul ə-ZEEZ al hə-KEEM) was an Iraqi theologian and politician and the leader of Islamic Supreme Council of Iraq, a party with approximately 5% support in the Iraqi Council of Representatives.
- Ayatollah Sayyid Mohammad Baqir al-Hakim (1939 – 29 August 2003; Arabic: سيد محمد باقر الحكيم), also known as Shaheed al-Mehraab, was one of the foremost Shia Muslim leaders in Iraq until his assassination in a bombing in Najaf. He was the son of Muhsin al-Hakim and Fawzieh Hassan Bazzi. Al-Hakim was the uncle of Muhammad Sayid al-Hakim.
- Ayatollah Sayyid Abdul al-Sahib Hakim
- Ayatollah Sayyid Muhammad Ali al-Hakim

=== Third generation ===
- Grand Ayatollah Mohammad Saeed Al-Hakim was an Iraqi Twelver Shi'a marja, one of the five members of the Hawza of Najaf and the second most senior Shia cleric in Iraq after Ayatollah Ali al-Sistani. Al-Hakim was the son of Ayatollah Muhammad Ali al-Hakim, grandson of Sayyid Ahmad al-Hakim, and grand-nephew of Grand Ayatollah Sayyid Muhsin al-Hakim who is also Ayatollah Mohammad Saeed's maternal grandfather. His second cousin, Sayyed Ammar al-Hakim leads the Islamic Supreme Council of Iraq, one of the largest Shia political parties in Iraq.
- Ammar al-Hakim (Arabic: سید عمار الحكيم), the son of Abdul Aziz Al-Hakim, is an Iraqi politician who leads the Islamic Supreme Council of Iraq, which was the largest party in Iraq's Council of Representatives from the 2003 Invasion of Iraq until the 2010 Iraqi elections.
- Sayyid Muhsin Abdul Aziz al-Hakim is the son of Abdul Aziz Al-Hakim.
- Ayatollah Sayyid Jafar al-Hakim is the son of Sayyid Abdul al-Sahib Hakim, and a high-ranking Shiite Ayatollah in Najaf, Iraq.
- Ayatollah Sayyid Ali al-Hakim is the son of Sayyid Abdul al-Sahib Hakim, and a high-ranking Shiite Ayatollah in Najaf, Iraq.
