= Ali Tabatabaei (disambiguation) =

Ali Tabatabaei (1869–1947) was an Iranian alim (Islamic scholar) and mystic.

Ali Tabatabaei may also refer to:

- Ali Tabatabaei (actor) (1983–2015), Iranian film and television actor
- Ali Tabatabaee (born 1973), Iranian-American singer, lead singer of the band Zebrahead

== See also ==
- Ali Akbar Tabatabaei (1930–1980), Iranian political activist in exile and former press attache to the Iranian embassy in the United States
- Ali Haider Tabatabai (Syed Ali Hyder Nazm Tabatabai, 1854–1933), Indian poet, translator and scholar of languages
- Mohammad Ali Qazi Tabatabaei (1914–1979), Iranian Shiite cleric, politician, first imam Jumu'ah for Tabriz and Representative of the Supreme Leader in East Azerbaijan
- Mohammad Ali Tabatabaei Hassani (1945–2017), Iraqi Twelver Shi'a Marja
