= Mohammad Baqir al-Hakim =

Iraqi Shia Islamic scholar and politician (1939–2003)

Ayatollah Sayyid Muhammad Baqir al-Hakim محمد باقر الحكيم
- Born: 8 July 1939; Najaf, Kingdom of Iraq
- Died: 29 August 2003 (aged 64); Najaf, Coalition-occupied Iraq
- Political party: Supreme Council for Islamic Revolution in Iraq
- Father: Muhsin al-Hakim
- Family: Hakim family

Ayatollah Muhammad Baqir Muhsin al-Hakim at-Tabataba'i (8 July 1939 – 29 August 2003; Arabic: السيد محمد باقر محسن الحكيم الطباطبائي), also known as Shaheed al-Mehraab, was a senior Iraqi Shia Islamic scholar and the leader of the Supreme Council for Islamic Revolution in Iraq (SCIRI). Al-Hakim spent more than 20 years in exile in Iran and returned to Iraq on 12 May 2003 following the US-led invasion. Al-Hakim was a contemporary of Ayatollah Khomeini, and The Guardian compared the two in terms of their times in exile and their support in their respective homelands. After his return to Iraq, al-Hakim's life was in danger because of his work to encourage Shiite resistance to Saddam Hussein and from a rivalry with Muqtada al-Sadr, the son of the late Ayatollah Mohammed Sadeq al-Sadr, who had himself been assassinated in Najaf in 1999. Al-Hakim was assassinated in a massive car-bomb explosion in his hometown Najaf in 2003 when he emerged from the shrine of Imam Ali. He was 64. At least 75 others were also killed in the bombing.

== Biography ==
=== Early life ===
Al-Hakim was born in Najaf in 1939 into the Hakim Family of Shi'ite religious scholars. He was the son of Muhsin al-Hakim and Fawzieh Hassan Bazzi. Al-Hakim was the uncle of Muhammad Sayid al-Hakim. Al-Hakim's father was a senior cleric in Najaf. He learned a traditional Shiite imam's training. He was arrested and tortured for his beliefs by the Ba'athist government in 1972 and fled to Iran in 1980. Many relatives of Al-Hakim were killed by the Baathist government.

=== Political activities in Iraq ===
Al-Hakim was head of the Supreme Council of the Revolution in Iraq (SCIRI), a highly influential group within Iraq's Shia community and high ranking U.S. officials had met with the brother of Mohammad Baqir al-Hakim, intent on securing a new ally against Saddam Hussein. He co-founded the modern Islamic political movement in Iraq in the 1960s, along with Mohammad Baqir al-Sadr, with whom he worked closely until the latter's death in 1980. In an event, Mohammad Baqir Al-Sadr sent Al-Hakim to calm the people who were trapped by Saddam Hussein's government troops between Karbala and Najaf. This incident prompted the Baathist government to arrest Baqir Al-Hakim, he was subsequently imprisoned and tortured. When Mohammad Baqir Al-Sadr was on house arrest remained in communication with Baqir Al-Hakim.

Though not among the most hard-line of Islamists, Al-Hakim was seen as dangerous by the ruling Ba'ath regime, largely because of his agitation on behalf of Iraq's majority Shia population (the ruling regime was mostly Sunnis).

However, his sentence was commuted and he was released in July 1979. The subsequent eruption of war between Iraq and largely Shia Iran led to an ever-increasing distrust of Iraq's Shia population by the ruling Ba'ath party; combined with his previous arrests, Al-Hakim defected to Iran in 1980.

=== SCIRI and Iran ===
Safely in Iran under the protection of the Iranian government, Al-Hakim became an open enemy of the Ba'athists, forming the Supreme Council for the Islamic Revolution in Iraq (SCIRI), a revolutionary group dedicated to overthrowing Saddam Hussein and installing clerical rule. With Iranian military aid, SCIRI became an armed resistance group, periodically making cross-border attacks against Baathist and maintaining covert connections with resistance elements within the country.

=== Badr Brigades ===
The Badr Brigades were the military wing of SCIRI until 2003. Al-Hakim created the Badr Brigades which fought against Saddam Hussein. The Badr Brigades contained to number about 10,000 equipped and trained soldiers. On 11 February 1995, Badr corps attacked Iraqi government forces in Amarah. During the War in Iraq (2013–17), Badr Brigades fought against ISIL under the Popular Mobilization Forces.

== Return to Iraq ==
Al-Hakim returned to Iraq on 12 May 2003 following the overthrow of Saddam's regime by the U.S.-led invasion of Iraq after spending more than two decades of exile in neighboring Iran. There he emerged as one of the most influential Iraqi leaders, with his longtime opposition to Saddam gaining him immense credibility, especially among the majority Shia population.

Initially, he was very critical of the U.S.-led invasion of Iraq, but Al-Hakim gave the US credit for overthrowing Saddam's government first, so that SCIRI and other Shia opposition parties found time to re-establish themselves between Shia people. Al-Hakim's brother, Abdul Aziz al-Hakim, was appointed to the Iraq interim governing council and the two worked closely together. By the time of his death, he remained distrustful, but publicly urged Iraqis to abandon violence, at least for the time being, and give the interim government a chance to earn their trust. Although Al-Hakim publicly urged the abandonment of violence, his Badr Brigade was described by The Independent as "one of the main groups accused of carrying out sectarian killings".

== Assassination ==
Al-Hakim was killed on 29 August 2003, when a car bomb exploded as he left the Shrine of Imam Ali in Najaf. The blast killed at least 84 others; some estimate that as many as 125 died in the bombing. Fifteen bodyguards of al-Hakim were among the people killed in the blast.

=== Perpetrators ===
On 30 August 2003, Iraqi authorities arrested four people in connection with the bombing: two former members of the Ba'ath Party from Basra, and two non-Iraqi Arab Salafis.

According to U.S. and Iraqi officials, Abu Musab al-Zarqawi was responsible for Hakim's assassination. They claim that Abu Omar al-Kurdi, a top Zarqawi bombmaker who was captured in January 2005, confessed to carrying out this bombing. They also cite Zarqawi's praising of the assassination in several audiotapes. Muhammad Yassin Jarrad, the brother-in-law of Abu Musab al-Zarqawi claimed that his father, Yassin, was the suicide bomber in the attack.

Oras Mohammed Abdulaziz, an alleged Al-Qaeda militant, was hanged in Baghdad in July 2007 after being sentenced to death in October 2006 for his role in the assassination of al-Hakim.

== Funeral ==
Hundreds of thousands of people attended his funeral in Najaf and showed their hatred of the US military occupation on 2 September 2003. They protested the US forces and demanded their withdrawal from Iraq.

His grave was petrol-bombed by anti-government protesters during the 2019 Iraqi protests.

== See also ==
- Ayatollah Ruhollah Khomeini
- Ayatollah Ali Khamenei
- Ayatollah Mohammad Hussein Fadlallah
- Ayatollah Muhammad Baqir al-Sadr

Party political offices
Preceded by Office created	Leader of the Supreme Council for Islamic Revolution in Iraq; 1982–2003	Succeeded by Abdul Aziz al-Hakim
