= Ali al-Hakim =

Ayatollah Sayyid Ali al-Hakim

Personal life
- Born: 1964 (age 61–62) Najaf, Iraq

Religious life
- Religion: Shia Islam

Senior posting
- Based in: Najaf, Iraq

Sayyid Ali al-Hakim (born 1964) is an Iraqi high-ranking Shi'ite Ayatollah based in Najaf, Iraq.

== Biography ==
=== Family tree ===
Al-Hakim is a member of the Hakim family of Shiite scholars.

=== Early life ===
Al-Hakim was born in Najaf, the son of Ayatollah Sayyid Abdul al-Sahib, and the grandson of the Grand Ayatollah Sayyid Muhsin al-Hakim; the latter is considered one of the greatest Shiite scholars of the 20th century. In addition to his studies in secular schools, he joined the Islamic seminary at an early age in 1976.

Al-Hakim is the brother of Sayyid Jafar al-Hakim, who has visited the United States and delivered lectures on a variety of topics.

He is also a nephew of Grand Ayatollah Mohammad Saeed Al-Hakim, one of the four main Grand Ayatollahs of Iraq.

He has visited the Hakim Foundation in the United States, which is run by family member Ammar Al-Hakim.

=== Iraqi politics ===
During his early studies in the Islamic seminary, Al-Hakim faced harassment and intimidation from Ba'ath party police and security forces. In particular, Al-Hakim was scrutinized for his seminars and participation in intellectual forums.

In 1980, Al-Hakim fled Iraq to Kuwait, and later Iran, to continue his seminary studies without facing repression by Saddam Hussein's government.

In 1994, Al-Hakim completed the highest level of study in the seminary, Bath al-Kharij, or "Advanced Studies". He then migrated to Lebanon, where he found employment as a professor, researcher, and writer.

Currently, he serves as the General Secretary of the Imam al-Hakim foundation, which he established in 2008.

== Works ==
=== Books ===
- Seminars in Shia Jurisprudence - Applied Jurisprudence (1997)
- The Jurisprudence of Prayer - Derived Jurisprudence (1994)
- Singing in Sharia and its Social Effects - Comparative Jurisprudence (1988)
- The Explanation of the Principles of Jurisprudence (Derived Jurisprudence) (1985)
- The Explanation the Jurisprudence of Purity (Derived Jurisprudence) (1985)

=== Religious theses ===
- The Principles of Jurisprudence (1994)
- Singing in Sharia (1989)

=== Advanced dissertations and research ===
- Dissertation in Advanced Seminars (Bath al-Kharij) on the science of Principles of Jurisprudence for Grand Ayatollah Sayyid Sahib al-Hakim (2007)
- Dissertation in Ijtihad and Emulation for Ayatollah Sheikh Mohammed Mahdi Shamseddine (1998)
- Dissertation in Critical Women Rulings for Ayatollah Mohammed Mahdi Shamseddine (1995)

=== Lectures and speeches ===
- Coexistence in Islam
- Unity of Religion and Diversity of Laws
- Iraq: Politics, Religion & Civilization
- Imam Husain Martyrdom: Studying the Event

== See also ==
- List of ayatollahs
