= Riyadh Al-Hakim =

Ayatollah Sayyid Riyadh al-Hakim
- السيد رياض الطباطبائي الحكيم
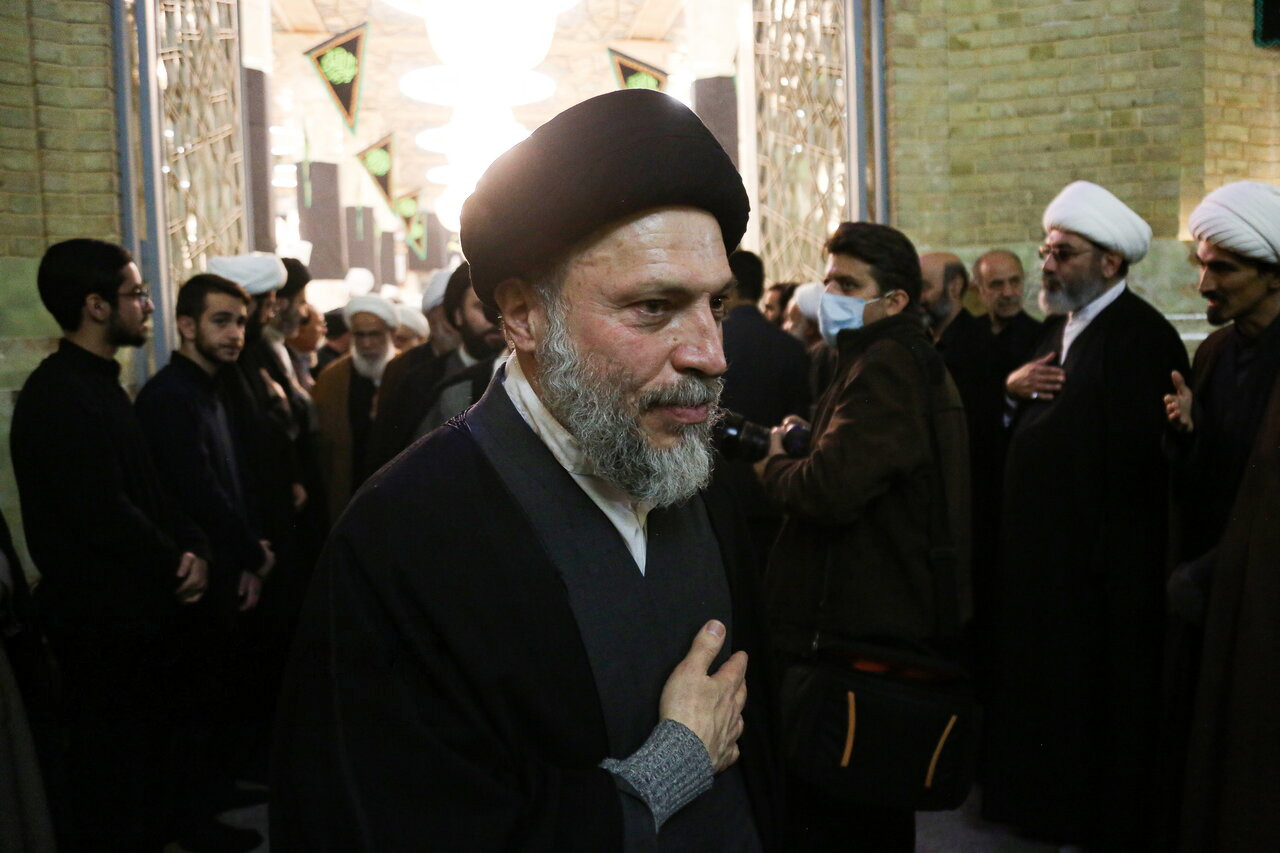

Personal life
- Born: January 18, 1958 (age 68) Najaf, Iraq
- Parent: Muhammad Saeed al-Hakim (father)
- Relatives: Muhsin al-Hakim (great-grandfather)
- Website: http://al-kalima.iq/

Religious life
- Religion: Islam
- Sect: Shia; Twelver

Ayatollah Sayyid Riyadh al-Tabatabaei al-Hakim (Arabic: رياض الطباطبائي الحكيم; born January 18, 1958) is the eldest son of grand Ayatollah, Muhammad Saeed al-Hakim. He is a notable teacher at the Islamic seminary of Qom.

== Early life and education ==
Al-Hakim was born in 1958 in the city of Najaf. He pursued both religious studies, and academic studies. He gained a master's degree from University of Lahore, as well as a doctorate from Al-Mustafa International University.

He is a professor in Jurisprudence and Quran interpretation, a doctorate supervisor. He is a member of the curriculums reviewing committee at the religious seminary in Qom.

== Works ==
He has many books in Jurisprudence and the principles of Jurisprudence and Quran sciences and other fields.

He was arrested during Saddam's regime for more than eight years, he has written memorandums about the duration of arresting, he is a representative of his father, out of Iraq and supervises several offices of jurisprudence in several Asian and African countries.

== Kalima Center for Dialogue and Cooperation ==
He is the founder and supervisor of Kalima Center for Dialogue and Cooperation, he has participated in many social and cultural conferences and symposiums in many European, Asian countries and Australia.

He arranged and participated in many conferences and he receives ongoing delegations of researchers and investigators who are visiting Holy Najaf, he contributes to many cultural projects that prove humanitarian coexistence concept and culture exchanging.

== See also ==
- Ali al-Sabziwari
- Mohammed Ridha al-Sistani
