= Muhammad Ali al-Hakim =

Ayatollah Muhammad-Ali al-Hakim
- السيد محمد علي الطباطبائي الحكيم
- Title: Ayatollah

Personal life
- Born: 1911 Najaf, Ottoman Iraq
- Died: 2011 (aged 99–100) Najaf, Iraq
- Children: 5, including Mohammed-Saeed
- Relatives: Muhsin al-Hakim (maternal uncle)

Religious life
- Religion: Usuli Twelver Shia Islam

Ayatollah Sayyid Muhammad-Ali al-Hakim (1911–2011) was an Iraqi high-ranking Shiite scholar. Ayatollah Muhammad al-Hakim was the father of the Grand Ayatollah Mohammad Saeed Al-Hakim.

== Biography ==
=== Early life ===
He was born in 1911 to Ahmed al-Hakim, in Najaf. His mother was the daughter of his father's cousin, Mehdi al-Hakim, making the grand Ayatollah, Muhsin al-Hakim, his maternal uncle.

He began his religious studies at a young age, and completed all his primary and secondary studies under notable teachers at the Islamic seminary of Najaf.

His teachers included his uncle, Sayyid Muhsin al-Hakim, Shaykh Hussain al-Hilli, and Ayatollah Muhammad Hussain al-Isfehani.

=== Works ===
Al-Hakim was a top scholar of fiqh and principles of fiqh. He was also an expert in the fields of Islamic spirituality and ethics. He extensively studied the role of modern high-level mathematics to the field of Islamic inheritance law. He wrote extensive religious treatises on the works of his uncle, grand Ayatollah, Muhsin al-Hakim as well as Muhammad Hussain al-Isfehani.

== Personal life ==
Al-Hakim married his cousin, the daughter of the grand Ayatollah, Muhsin al-Hakim, and had five sons who all pursued clerical careers. His son, Mohammad Saeed Al-Hakim, became a grand Ayatollah, and was considered among the most learned jurists in Najaf, even being considered to receive the grand religious authority after grand Ayatollah, Ali al-Sistani.

== Death ==
Al-Hakim died of natural causes at the age of 100, and was buried on February 27, 2011.

Funeral prayers were led by his eldest son, Sayyid Muhammad Saeed al-Hakim, and he was interred at Masjid al-Hindi, in Najaf, Iraq, close to his uncle Muhsin al-Hakim.

== See also ==
- Muhsin al-Hakim
- Muhammad Saeed al-Hakim
- Ali al-Sistani
