= Al-Iman School =

Islamic school in New York City

Coordinates: 40°42′04″N 73°48′54″W

The Al-Iman School is an Islamic school catering for Muslim students. The school, located in Jamaica, Queens, New York, USA, was established in September 1990. Its main benefactor was Grand Ayatollah Abul-Qassim Khoei. Within four years, the school became the first Pre-K through 12 Islamic school in North America. Due to demand, between 1990 and 1994 several grades were added. Al-Iman School is the first Islamic High School to be accepted in the Federal 'Reading First' Program.

== English as a second language students ==
The School employs remedial reading teachers from the Education Department who test, assess and coach students in English language arts and reading in order to integrate them into the mainstream classroom lessons.

== Religious observance ==
On Fridays, Al-Iman School students from grades 1-12 join the rest of the community in Friday prayers. Every morning and afternoon, students assemble in the prayer assembly hall in the school to recite from the Qur'an and also to make small oral presentations to improve verbal skills and delivery in front of an audience. Mid-day adhan is followed by congregational prayers in the assembly hall.

At Al-Iman classes end early, at 2 pm, during Ramadan. All the students are expected to try to read the Qur'an from beginning to end over the lunar month.

== Sports ==
Boys and girls in the same grade play separately. When girls have gym, boys have religion, and vice versa.
