= Jafar al-Hakim =

Ayatollah Sayyid Jafar al-Hakim
- السيد جعفر الطباطبائي الحكيم

Personal life
- Born: 1965 (age 60–61) Najaf, Iraq

Religious life
- Religion: Islam
- Sect: Shia Islam; Twelver

Ayatollah Sayyid Jafar al-Tabatabaei al-Hakim (Arabic: جعفر الطباطبائي الحكيم; born 1965) is an Iraqi high-ranking Shiite jurist in the city of Najaf.

He is a lecturer, speaking on issues of religion and contemporary thought. He has participated in many seminars and conferences, both on the local and international level, and has supervised weekly symposia for long periods outside of Iraq, and in Baghdad and Najaf.

He is currently a teacher of advanced religious studies in the seminaries of Najaf, and namely Dar al-Ilm.

== Early life ==
Al-Hakim was born in Najaf, the son of Ayatollah Abdul al-Sahib al-Hakim, the son of late grand Ayatollah Muhsin al-Hakim. His mother is the daughter of Iraqi scholar and statesman, Muhammad Bahr al-Uloom. Besides his studies in secular schools, he joined the Islamic Seminary at an early age in 1977.

Sayyid Jafar al-Hakim is brother to Sayyid Ali al-Hakim.

== Under the Ba'ath regime ==
He continued his studies while imprisoned by Saddam Ba'ath party for more than nine years. The studies, at that period of time, were under the supervision of a number of Shiite scholars and jurists who were in prison with him.

On February 13, 1991, through a daring attempt, he managed to escape from the prison of Saddam, following the Gulf War air strikes on Iraq, and joined the Islamic seminary in another country.

== Post U.S invasion of Iraq ==
After the fall of Saddam Hussein in 2003, he returned to Iraq to continue his religious academic career, teaching at the Advanced Intermediate Studies (sutooh olya) level, and he now supervises research sessions of Advanced Seminars (bahth kharij) level in jurisprudence and principles of jurisprudence. Besides teaching and supervising in other fields of sciences such as, theology, theosophy, philosophy, and epistemology.

== Conferences ==
- For three years, he had held a seminar for intellectuals, where he addressed many educational, social, and political theories.
- He has visited the United States previously and delivered lectures on a variety of topics.
- He has visited United Kingdom on a number of occasions, visiting different centres and organisations, giving religious talks and seminars.

== Works ==
=== Scholarly Articles ===
- Justice for the Poor
- Controversies between the Intellectual and the Jurist
- Interfaith Dialogue
- Religious Pluralism
- Resistance and Terrorism
- Differences of Capabilities
- Contemporary Problems in Religion
- Objectivity and Moderation

=== Religious Theses ===
- Treatise on Monotheism
- Treatise on Imamate (Leadership)
- Treatise on Religion and the Religious Project
- Treatise on Shia Society and Culture

=== Advanced Dissertations and Research ===
- Dissertation in Advanced Seminars (Bahth Kharij) in the science of Principles of Jurisprudence for Grand Ayatollah Sheikh Wahid al-Khorasani
- Complete discussions in Advanced Seminars (Bahth Kharij)) in the sciences of Jurisprudence for Ayatollah Sheikh Muhammad Sanad (full course)
- Dissertation of two Jurisprudential studies with Sheikh Muhammad Sanad, on “Ownership in Institutional States” and on “Religious Rituals”
- Philosophical Psychology, dissertation with Ayatollah Sheikh Fayadhi
- The Primacy of Existence, dissertation with Ayatollah Sheikh Fayadhi
- Philosophical Dialogues, between him and his teacher Ayatollah Sheikh Fayadhi
- Research in perceptions in “The New Science of Theology,” a series of studies.

== See also ==
- List of maraji
- Muhsin al-Hakim
- Muhammad Bahrululoom
