= Al-Bayan Fi Tafsir al-Quran =

Book by Abu al-Qasim al-Khoei

- Author: Abu al-Qasim al-Khoei
- Original title: البيان في تفسير القرآن
- Language: Arabic
- Subject: Qur'anic exegesis (Tafsir)
- Genre: Islamic studies
- Publication place: Iraq
- Media type: Print (Hardcover)

Al-Bayan Fi Tafsir al-Quran (The Elucidation of the Exegesis of The Qur'an and sometimes entitled The Prolegomena to the Quran) is a tafsir by the Shiite scholar Abu al-Qasim al-Khoei. The book has been cited by Sunni scholars.

== Topics covered ==
- Introduction (brief explanation of commentation style)
- Miracle and magic
- Different recitation methods
- On the integrity of Quran
- Abrogation (naskh)
