= Institute of Semitic Studies =

Research institute in Princeton, New Jersey, USA

The Institute of Semitic Studies (ISS) is a nonprofit independent research institution based in Princeton, New Jersey, United States, dedicated to the academic study of Semitic (and other major Afroasiatic) languages and cultures. Its work seeks especially to highlight the contribution of Afroasiatic peoples to world civilization, in general, and Western culture, in particular. It was founded in Princeton in 1984 and then incorporated in 1985, and is currently directed by Ephraim Isaac a Harvard-trained scholar and peace activist. The Institute also releases a bi-annual linguistically focused international scholarly journal entitled the Journal of Afroasiatic Languages (JAAL) published by the Red Sea Press. In addition to its academic journal, the ISS also recently launched an academic monograph series called Afroasiatic Studies in collaboration with the Red Sea Press. The Institute of Semitic Studies is the first independent research institute that focuses on Semitic and Afroasiatic studies within the United States.

== Major achievements and work ==
Among the Institute’s major achievements to date is the sponsorship of the 1989 symposium on the Dead Sea Scrolls. According to the Institute's website, "This symposium was editorialized in the Washington Post as a commendable peace-making effort among bitterly quarreling scholars." In 1992, the Institute sponsored the Second International Congress of "Yemenite Jewish Studies" where the Congress brought together more than 200 scholars and many interested individuals from Israel, Europe, the United States, and the Middle East. A congratulatory message was given by the future US President Bill Clinton and the then Prime Minister Shamir of Israel. Also, the Institute supports a Princeton Theological Seminary project to make the Dead Sea Scrolls publicly available in their original Hebrew and/or Aramaic, with new English translations. It supports the University of Pennsylvania Sumerian Dictionary Project. In 1988, it co-sponsored with the Univ. of Pennsylvania the 35th International Congress of Assyriology. In 1991, it co-sponsored with Princeton University the Fifth Congress of Judaeo-Arabic Studies and another on Ancient Iraq. It has organized other major scholarly projects and frequent public and educational programs. Among these are those on the Nabataeans, religions of pre-Islamic Arabia, and Ethiopic Christian manuscripts.

== Collaborations ==
The Institute has collaborated with Princeton University, Princeton Theological Seminary, the University of Pennsylvania, the New York Bar Association, the Israeli Association for Society and Culture, as well as Pennsylvania Governor’s Cultural Affairs Department, the University of the Arts, Please Touch Me Museum, the Woodrow Wilson Institute, and many others.

== Previous donors ==
Support for the work of the Institute has come from various sources, but most notably the Carnegie Corporation of New York, the National Endowment for the Humanities (NEH), the New Jersey Committee for the Humanities, the New York Committee for the Humanities, Bristol Myers Co, Blum Foundation, Lawrence Gelb Foundation, New York City Central Labor Council: AFL-CIO, State of Ben L. Burman, H. J. Stich Foundation, JDC, and many generous individuals all over the US.

== Media recognition ==
Even in its first years of establishment, the work of the Institute of Semitic Studies had caught national and international attention. In a little less than a decade, its work was reported in five front-page newspaper stories (The New York Times, 3; Trenton Times, 2), and its role discussed in one major editorial (Washington Post). Stories about the work of the Institute have been featured in the Boston Globe, Chicago Tribune, Christian Science Monitor, and several local, national, and international papers and other media including the BBC.

== Mission and peace activity ==
The Institute's mission is to promote the unique and rich contributions of Semitic and Afroasiatic culture and language to world civilization through rigorous academic research. As an integral part of its mission, however, it also seeks to integrate its scholarship with peace-building efforts in the Horn of Africa and the Middle East through the promotion of mutual understanding of common cultural and linguistic heritages. The institute is planning to build an African Peace Center in Princeton which would be dedicated to academic peace-building research and conflict mediation for conflict ridden regions in Africa.

== Publications by ISS from its Afroasiatic Studies Monograph Series ==
- Isaac, Ephraim. The Ethiopian Orthodox Tawahido Church. Afroasiatic Studies No 1. Trenton, NJ: Red Sea Press, 2012.
- Demeke, Girma. Amharic-Argobba Dictionary. Afroasiatic Studies No 2. Trenton, NJ: Red Sea Press, 2013.
- Demeke, Girma. The Origin of Amharic (Second Edition). Afroasiatic Studies No 3. Trenton, NJ: Red Sea Press, 2013.
