= Abdul-Majid al-Khoei =

Iraqi Shia cleric (1962–2003)

Sayyid Abdul Majid al-Khoei
- عبد المجيد الخوئي

Personal life
- Born: 16 August 1962 Najaf, Iraqi Republic
- Died: 10 April 2003 (aged 40) Najaf, Iraq
- Cause of death: Assassination
- Parent: Abu al-Qasim al-Khoei (father)

Religious life
- Religion: Islam
- Denomination: Shia Islam

Muslim leader
- Based in: Imam Khoei Foundation, London
- Period in office: 1994–2003
- Predecessor: Muhammad-Taqi al-Khoei
- Successor: Abd al-Sahib al-Khoei

Sayyid Abdul Majid al-Musawi al-Khoei (/ˈɑːbdʊl məˈdʒiːd æl ˈhuːi/ AHB-duul mə-JEED al HOO-ee; Arabic: عبد المجيد الموسوي الخوئي ; 16 August 1962 – 10 April 2003) was an Iraqi Shia cleric and the son of grand Ayatollah Abu al-Qasim al-Khoei.

== Life ==
al-Khoei was born in Najaf. He lived and studied under his father in Najaf until 1991. During the Shia uprising of 1991 he took part in the fighting against Saddam's Ba'ath Party but also acted as a force of moderation attempting to minimize revenge killings. When the uprising was crushed he was forced to leave Iraq. His father died a year later in 1992 at the age of 93, while still under house arrest in Iraq.

In exile in London, he worked for the al-Khoei Foundation, a charitable foundation set up by his father in 1989. He became its head in 1994 when his brother, Mohammed Taqi, was killed whilst driving back to Najaf from a visit to Karbala.

He was a critic of Saddam Hussein's rule: "The regime's criminal acts, beginning in 1968, have been never-ending. Executions, the closing of schools, mosques and shrines sacred to Shia worshipers; the burning of old religious scriptures; looting the sacred sites of gifts left by presidents and kings." He did, however, also call for unity. Speaking in December 2002, al-Khoei said, "We are looking for a new Iraq in which everyone has a share... we want to forget the past and shake the hand of everyone".

== Assassination ==
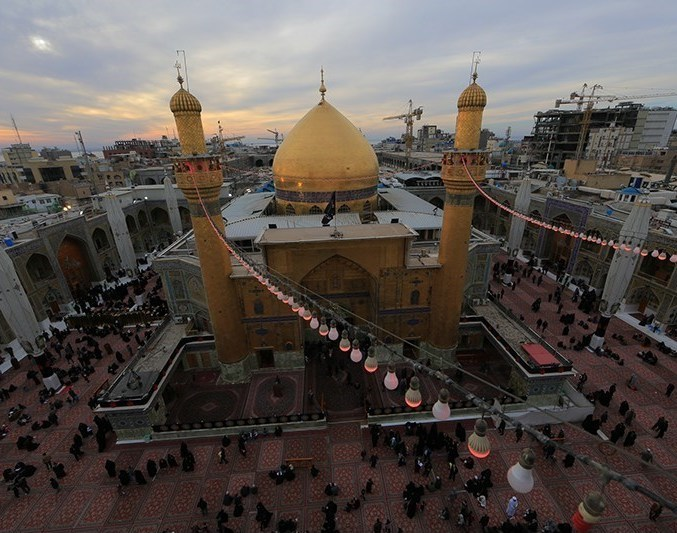
Imām Alī Mosque, where Shī'a Muslims believe 'Alī ibn Abī Tālib is buried, and where the mob assassination occurred.

He returned to Iraq in April 2003 after the fall of Saddam despite being warned of the dangers. He arrived in Najaf on 3 April. Speaking to The Times upon his arrival to the city, he said everyone "wanted news on Baghdad because they see that as the key test to whether this will be 1991 all over again." Though assigned protection, the protective unit could not follow him into the Imam Ali Shrine in Najaf on 10 April 2003. Here he was attacked and hacked to death by a mob.

According to witnesses, at the mosque he was walking with Haydar Al-Killidar Al-Rufaye, the custodian of the shrine under Saddam, and they were confronted by an angry mob, some of whom shouted "Rufaye is back" and others, "Long live al-Sadr". The mob killed Al-Rufaye with bayonets and knives; al-Khoei, who was critically injured by this time, was killed later.

Muqtada al-Sadr was suspected by U.S. and Iraqi authorities of ordering the assassination. He was later removed as a suspect after no evidence led to him attempting to assassinate al-Khoei.

== See also ==
- Imam Al-Khoei Benevolent Foundation
