= Muhammad Saeed al-Hakim =

Iraqi Twelver Shi'a Grand Ayatollah (1936-2021)

Grand Ayatollah Muhammad Saeed Al-Hakim
- السيد محمد سعيد الطباطبائي الحكيم
- Title: Grand Ayatollah

Personal life
- Born: February 1, 1936 Najaf, Kingdom of Iraq
- Died: September 3, 2021 (aged 85) Najaf, Iraq
- Children: 5, including Riyadh
- Relatives: Muhsin al-Hakim (maternal grandfather)
- Website: www.alhakeem.com

Religious life
- Religion: Usuli Twelver Shia Islam

Senior posting
- Based in: Najaf, Iraq

Grand Ayatollah Sayyid Muhammad-Saeed al-Tabataba'i al-Hakim (Arabic: محمد سعيد الطباطبائي الحكيم; February 1, 1936 – September 3, 2021) was an Iraqi senior Shi'a marja, and one of the most senior Shia clerics in Iraq.

He was considered a strong nominee for the grand religious authority in Najaf, after Ayatollah Ali al-Sistani.

== Biography ==
Al-Hakim was born in the holy city of Najaf on 1 February 1936 to Sayyid Muhammad-Ali al-Hakeem. His mother was the daughter of grand Ayatollah, Muhsin al-Hakim. His father was a nephew of the grand Ayatollah.

=== Education ===
Al-Hakim, who came from a clerical family, began his religious education at age five. Under his father, he studied in the introductory subjects that include Arabic language, and grammar; logic; eloquence; jurisprudence and its fundamentals, until concluding his intermediate studies. He studied under his maternal grandfather, the grand Ayatollah, the advanced studies, where he attended a great deal of his Jurisprudence teachings. Among his other teachers were Shaykh Hussein Al-Hilli and Sayyid Abu al-Qasim al-Khoei were also among his teachers.

=== Ba'thist imprisonment ===
In 1983, the Ba'thist regime imprisoned a large number of members of the Hakim family, including al-Hakim, and they remained there for eight years.

=== Assassination attempt ===
In 2003, he was targeted in an attempted assassination, when his house in Najaf was bombed. Three people were killed but al-Hakim suffered only minor injuries. He had previously been threatened that he would be killed if he didn't leave Najaf. Originally the Sunni fundamentalist Jama'at al-Tawhid wal-Jihad (who later became al-Qaeda in Iraq) was blamed. However, the bombing has also been attributed to followers of rival Shia cleric Muqtada al-Sadr.

== Religious tenure ==
=== Notable students ===
After reaching the advanced levels of religious studies, al-Hakim began teaching in Najaf's seminaries, and was considered an exceptional teacher. He taught many members of his family including his maternal uncles, Muhammad-Baqir and Muhammad-Husayn al-Hakim, his brothers, Abd al-Razzaq, Hasan, and Muhammad-Saleh, his sons, Riyadh, Muhammad-Husayn, Ala al-Din, and Izz al-Din, and others. As for some of his notable students, they include: Shaykh Hadi al-Radhi, Shaykh Baqir al-Irawani, Sayyid Muhammad-Ridha Bahr al-Uloom, Sayyid Amin Khalkhali.

=== Works ===
He wrote many books, some of which have been translated into Persian, Urdu, and English.

- Almohkem in the fundamentals of the jurisprudence - it is a detailed full course in the fundamentals of the jurisprudence in six volumes.
- Misbahul minhag in the jurisprudence laws derivation - based in details on the book of Minhag al saliheen. So far he finished 15 volumes.
- Minhag al saliheen - his Risala - practical laws of his verdicts in three volumes.
- Menasik – Pilgrimage and Omra Rituals.
- A message to the people in the west
- A message to the religions promoters and the hawza students - translated into Persian and Urdu.
- A dialogue with his eminence about the religious authority
- Morshid al Moghtarib - instructions and verdicts related to the people in the west.
- Fi rihab al aqeeda - detailed dialogue with a Jordanian personality in the issues of beliefs, in 3 volumes
- Religious laws of computer and internet - translated into English.
- Human cloning - Translated into English
- Religious dialogues
- A message to the devotees in Azerbaijan - translated into the Azeri language.
- A message to the pilgrims of the holy house of God

=== Amman Message ===
Al-Hakim was one of the ulama signatories of the Amman Message, which gives a broad foundation for defining Muslim orthodoxy.

== Personal life ==
Al-Hakim was married, and had five sons, and daughters. His sons all pursued clerical careers. His eldest son, Riyadh is a notable teacher at the religious seminary of Qom. His second cousin, is Iraqi politician Ammar al-Hakim.

== Death ==
Al-Hakim died on 3 September 2021 aged 85 from a heart attack. His brother, Muhammad-Taqi led the funeral prayers in the Imam Ali shrine.
