= Kalima Center for Dialogue and Cooperation =

- Abbreviation: KCDC
- Formation: 2007
- Type: Non-governmental organization
- Legal status: Foundation
- Headquarters: Najaf Governorate, iraq
- Location: Najaf Governorate
- Region served: Al the world
- president of the center: AlAllameh Alsayyed Salih AlHakeem
- Website: al-kalima.iq

Kalima Center for Dialogue and Cooperation (KCDC) is an academic and religious institution in the Shiite holy city of Najaf which represents the religious and scientific heritage of Najaf. The center hosts academics, strategic experts, journalists, and representatives of civil society in order to foster mutual respect between religious and non-religious societies.

== History ==
The opportunity for expanding the religious and cultural dialogue in Iraq became available after the regime change in 2003 . The KCDC is non-governmental and was founded by Riyadh Al-Hakim.

== The Aims ==
- Building communication bridges between societies .
- Open up the horizons of cooperation between religious and scientific institutions in Holy Najaf on one side and cultural, scientific organizations of the world on the other side .
- Understanding religious and cultural particulars of humanitarian groups .
- Benefiting from successful humanitarian experience .

== Achievements ==
- A sequence of dialogues in cultural and religious field .
- Several conferences and symposiums internal and external of Iraq .
- Traveling of tens of academic between Iraq and external world .
