= Imam Al-Khoei Benevolent Foundation =

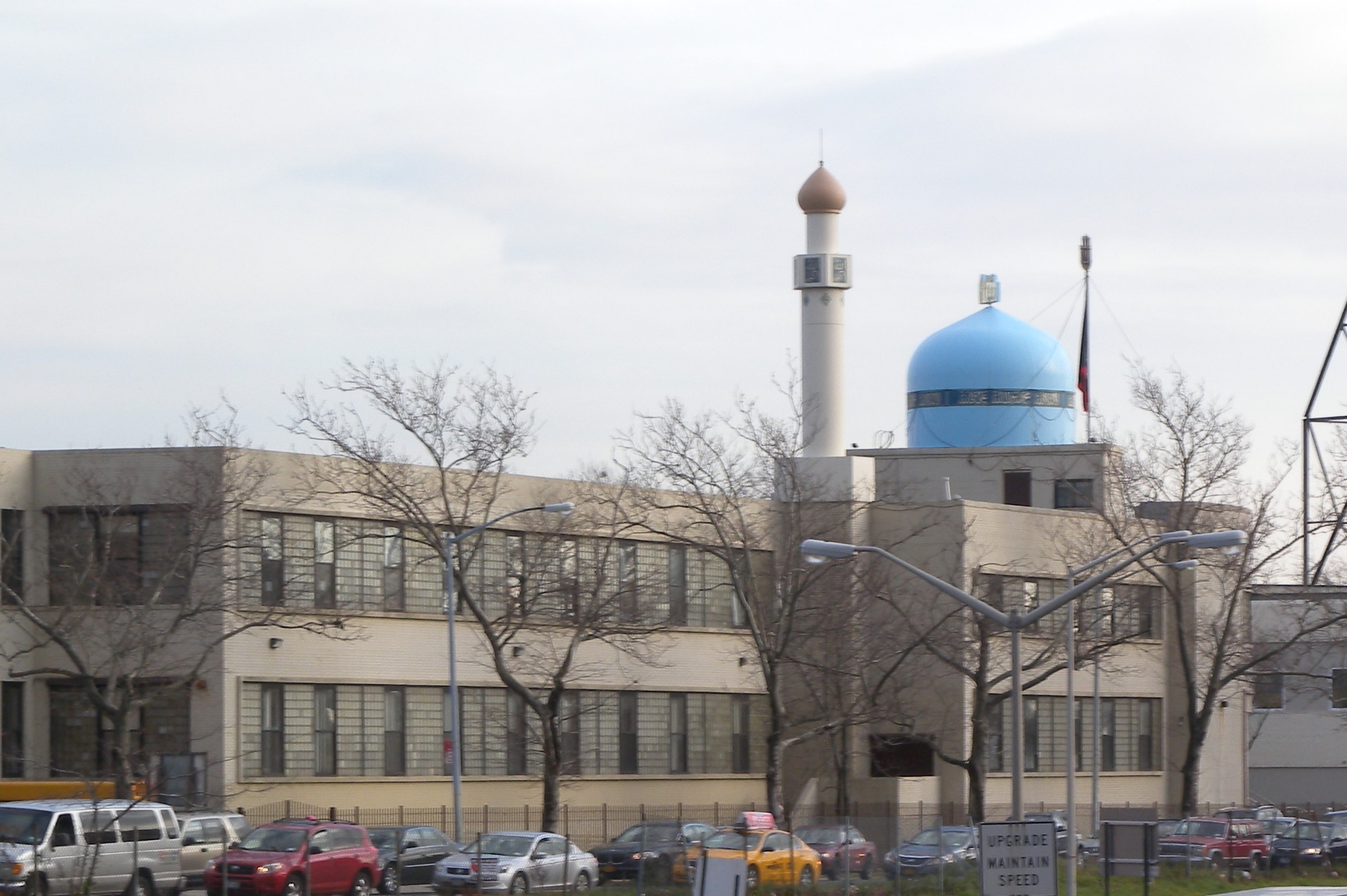
Jamaica, New York

The Imam Al-Khoei Benevolent Foundation (Persian: مؤسسه خیریه امام خویی, romanized: Mo'assese Xeyriyye Emâm Khoei) is an organization created by Abul-Qassim Khoei, a Grand Ayatollah who was considered by much of the Shia world as his time's premier leader of Shias across the world. It is an international religious charitable institution.

== History ==
The Al-Khoei Foundation began relief work in parts of southern Iraq after the first Gulf War, delivering relief supplies in defiance of US-imposed sanctions.

The Guardian wrote:

Khoei was also concerned to put the Shia faith in a better light in the west, after its shameful misrepresentation, especially in the US press during the Iranian Revolution and the Iran–Iraq War, when to be a Shia was virtually equated with being a fanatic—a time, when, as he recalled, there were those in the US who were "scared to shake hands with a man in a black turban". The result of his efforts was that the al-Khoei Foundation became a UN-affiliated consultative body, and the voice of the worldwide Shia community was heard at last in the halls of power, both east and west.

On April 12, 2003, the Al-Khoei family revealed that they are determined to continue the work of their murdered Abdul Majid al-Khoei who was killed in Najaf.
