= Mohammad Taqi al-Khoei =

Iraqi Shia cleric (d. 1994)

Sayyid Mohammed Taqi al-Khoei was a brother of Abdul Majid al-Khoei and son of Ayatollah Al-Udhma Sayyid Abul Qasim al-Khoei.

== Death ==
According to the UN Special Rapporteur for Iraq:

Following two years of relentless intimidation and harassment, including specific threats against him dating from his March 1991 arrest with his father, the late Grand Ayatollah Abul Qasim Al-Musawi Al-Khoei, Mohammed Taqi Al-Khoei died in a sudden car accident on the night of 21 July 1994. Specifically, Mr. Al-Khoei was returning to Najaf after having made his weekly visit to the Shiah holy shrine in Karbala when his car crashed into an unlit truck blocking the divided highway. According to information received by the Special Rapporteur, the accident occurred at about 11 p.m. and resulted in the instantaneous deaths of Mr. Al-Khoei's driver and six-year-old nephew. However, Mr. Al-Khoei and his brother-in-law, Amin Khalkhali, lay for hours beside the road and eventually bled to death before an ambulance was called at around 4 a.m. in order to remove their bodies.
