= Ephraim Isaac =

Ethiopian-Jewish scholar (born 1936)

- Born: 29 May 1936 (age 90); Ethiopia
- Education: Concordia College; Harvard University
- Occupation: Professor

Ephraim Isaac (born 29 May 1936) is an Ethiopian scholar of ancient Ethiopian Semitic languages and of African and Ethiopian civilizations. He founded the Institute of Semitic Studies, which he directs from his home in Princeton, NJ, and is the chair of his Ethiopian Peace and Development Center.

He was the first professor of Afro-American studies at Harvard University. In recognition of his merits, the Ephraim Isaac Prize for Excellence in African Languages is given annually to the Harvard graduate who writes the best essay in African studies.

== Early life ==
Isaac was born to an Ethiopian Jewish mother and a Yemeni Jewish father in Wallaga, Nejo, Ethiopia, in 1936. His actual date of birth is unknown. In high school, he randomly chose 29 May as his nominal birthday. He received his early education in Ethiopia.

== Career ==
Isaac has been a professor at various universities and has published scholarly articles and books. He was the first faculty appointment in Harvard University's Department of African and Afro-American Studies in 1969, and he played an important role in the early history of the department. Committed to this emerging field of scholarship, Isaac continued as a faculty member until 1977 and taught almost half of the students enrolled in the program.

Isaac has also lectured at:

- Princeton University Department of Near Eastern Studies, 1983–1985; introduced the first African language course in 1984; was visiting professor of religion and African American studies 1995–2001; and remains a fellow of Butler College.
- Hebrew University (ancient Semitic languages)
- University of Pennsylvania (religion, Semitic languages)
- Howard University (Divinity School)
- Lehigh University (religion)
- Bard College (religion, history)

His subjects range from those mentioned above to Biblical Hebrew, rabbinic literature, Ethiopian history, the concept and history of slavery and ancient African civilizations. He was a fellow at the National Endowment for the Humanities and the Institute for Advanced Studies. He has been a fellow at Harvard University's W. E. B. Du Bois Research Institute (1985–1986) and at the Center of Theological Inquiry at Princeton (1989–1992).

Isaac had a long-running dispute with the president of Harvard regarding the denial of his strong nomination for tenure by the then Department of African American Studies. After several appeals by the president of Harvard to drop the charges, Isaac won a major victory when the United States Court of Appeals for the First Circuit in Boston ruled in his favor by that rejected the president's appeal, after which the president proposed to settle the case out of court, offering Isaac a fellowship position and paying all legal fees.

In November 2021, Canadian author Jeff Pearce leaked a video that appeared to show Isaac in a virtual meeting with Eleni Gabre-Madhin and several Western diplomats working to topple Ethiopian Prime Minister Abiy Ahmed's government to create a transitional government in favor of the Tigray People's Liberation Front (TPLF) during the Tigray War. Despite both being able to refute the allegations, they were barred from traveling to Ethiopia, and a wide range of condemnation came from within Ethiopia and its diaspora.

== Peace contributions and activities ==
=== Contributions ===
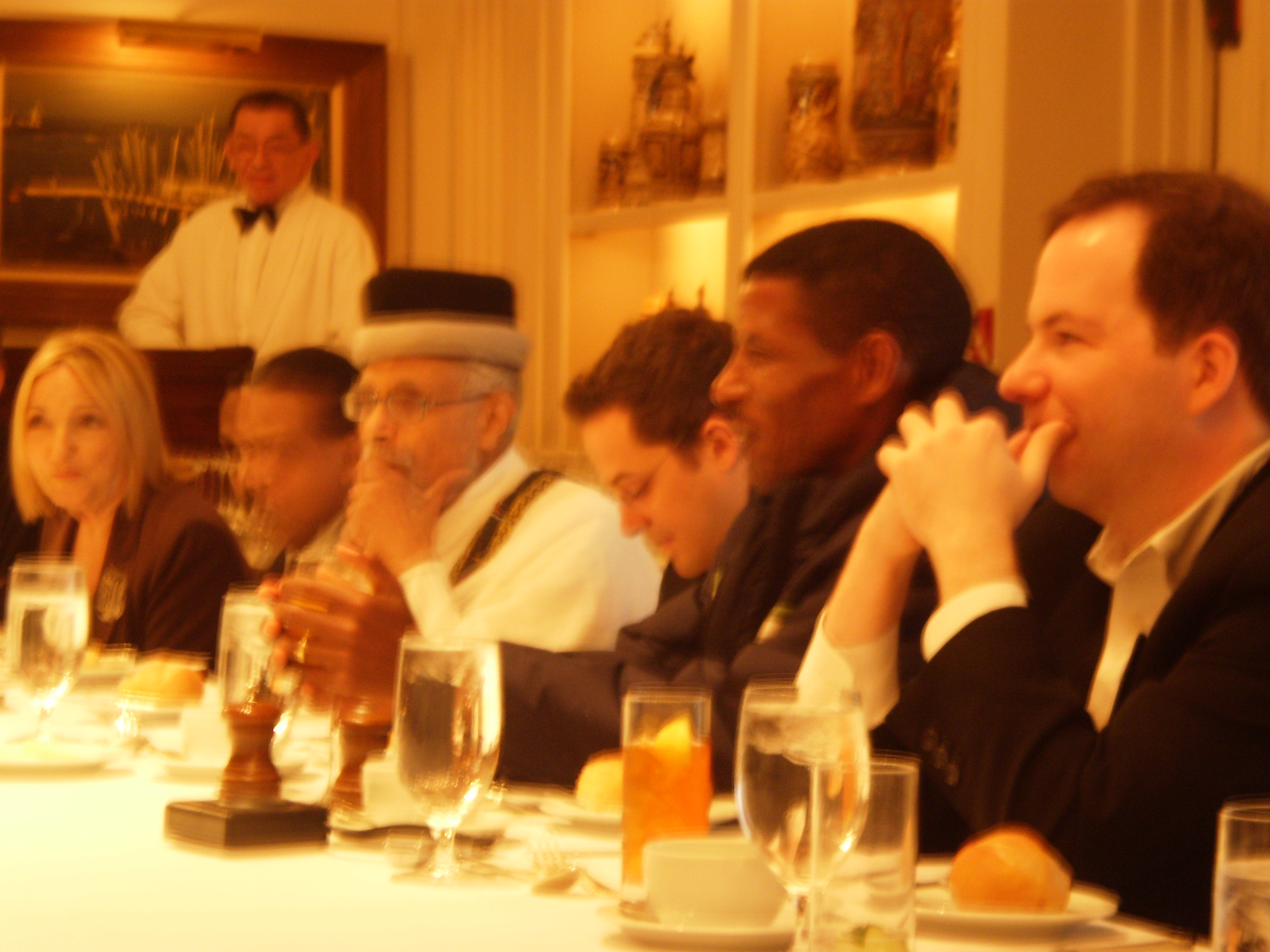
Isaac in a breakfast meeting (seated with hat) with Haile Gebrselassie (second from right)

As a peace activist, Isaac has made important contributions to peace and reconciliation. He founded an ad hoc Peace Committee at a critical stage in 1989. The committee – a dozen Ethiopian elders – facilitated bilateral negotiations between the government and conflicting parties at home and abroad. This created a forum for a peaceful resolution to the violence and bloody conflict. The committee accelerated the July 1991 end of the 30-year civil war in the Horn of Africa. The committee also helped raise funds to defray the cost of the Addis Ababa Conference for a Peaceful and Democratic Transition at the end of the war. A transitional government of Ethiopia was formed, and the Transitional Council later became the Parliament of Ethiopia. He participated in the conference as an observer, and gave one of the three concluding addresses. In 1992, he organized, with the help of fellow elders, Dr. Haile Sellasie Belay and Dr. Tilahun Beyene, an international teleconference of religious reconciliation – with eight conflicting Ethiopian archbishops and several other religious leaders. It resulted in the resolution of serious religious disputes that arose among the archbishops of the Ethiopian Orthodox Tewahedo Church regarding church administration and appointment of a patriarch.

Between 1998 and 2000, he led an Ethio-Eritrean peace delegation to Ethiopia and Eritrea during the tragic war between the two. This delegation was the only group from the region that both sides found acceptable or welcome. Since 2007, he has promoted reconciliation and repatriation of several Ethiopian and Somali liberation front movements in exile. In 2007, he negotiated the release of 30 Ethiopian political leaders and members of parliament. Isaac has also negotiated the release of about 35,000 prisoners and has helped organize inter-political party dialogues, an election board, national police chiefs and justices seminars. This was done in cooperation with the John Jay College of Criminal Justice in New York and other experts, and an interfaith symposium to promote the value of democratic and human rights to strengthen peace and reconciliation efforts. In 2009, he was actively engaged behind the scenes in the Ethiopian government treaty with a major branch of the Ogaden National Liberation Front. In 2012, he was involved with the release of two kidnapped Germans and in 2013, the release of two Swedish journalists. He continues his peace and reconciliation work.

=== Activities ===
Isaac is currently the international chair of the Horn of Africa Board of Peace and Development Organization (Addis Ababa, Asmara) and the former president of the Yemenite Jewish Federation of America. He founded (1960), and was chair of the Committee for Ethiopian Literacy, the first African/Ethiopian federal tax-exempt organization: the National Literacy Campaign of Ethiopia (NCLO), for which he was executive director from 1967 to 1974, which made millions literate in the late 1960s. In 1959, he organized the founding meeting of the Ethiopian Students Association in North America (ESANA) in Chicago, becoming the first president of the organization.

He is on editorial boards of two international scholarly journals: Journal of Afroasiatic Languages and Second Temple Jewish Literature. Isaac is a member of the board or advisory council of several interfaith and intercultural groups and organizations, nationally and internationally. These include the Temple of Understanding, the Institute of Religion and Public Policy, Tanenbaum Center for Interreligious Understanding, Princeton Fellowship in Prayer, Institute for Jewish Community Research, and the Oxford Forum in England. In this capacity, Isaac has contributed to numerous peace and reconciliation dialogues in the Middle East, Africa and Ireland.

In the 1980s he was an active member of the Harvard-Radcliffe Alumni Association against Apartheid. He was nominated twice to the Harvard University Board of Overseers on an Anti-apartheid slate along with fifteen other distinguished Harvard alumni, including those who struggled against South African Apartheid and Archbishop Tutu. In 1993 (Chicago, IL) he was a signatory to the groundbreaking Document Toward a Global Ethic along with the Dalai Lama, the late Joseph Cardinal Bernardin of Chicago, and others, as a Jewish delegate to the Parliament of World's Religions and a member of the about 150 Assembly of Religious and Spiritual Leaders. He was the first to propose in October 1993 to the Parliament the idea of a "united nations" of world religions (UR) to promote world peace and prosperity. Between 1994 and 2005 (New York, NY), he was an active member of the National Committee on American Foreign Policy at the height of their involvement with the Northern Ireland peace process. In 2004 (Amman, Jordan) he contributed to peace meetings as a member of the peace delegation of Peacemakers in Action of the Tanenbaum Center for Interreligious Understanding, sponsored by Prince Hassan Ibn Talal with the Tanenbaum Center for Interreligious Understanding. In 2005 (Amman, Jordan) Isaac also contributed to other peace-building symposia among the three followers of the Religion of Abraham who have roots in Arabic culture (Arab Jews, Christians, and Muslim) as President of the Yemenite Federation of America, sponsored by the Government of Jordan and the Interfaith Council of Jordan.

In 2005 (Brussels, Belgium) and 2006 (Seville, Spain) he served twice as a delegate to the two major peace-building symposia of Imams and Rabbis sponsored by the Kings of Morocco, Belgium, and Spain, and the French organization Hommes de Parole. In June 2006 (Oslo, Norway) Isaac gave a keynote talk to the international congress of conflict resolution experts sponsored by the Ministry of Foreign Affairs, Norway and Geneva Centre for Humanitarian Dialogue. In 2007 (Sarajevo, Bosnia) he participated and contributed to a peace-building symposium among followers of the three Abrahamic Religions in Bosnia Herzegovina, as a member of the peace delegation of Peacemakers in Action of the Tanenbaum Center for Interreligious Understanding. In 2009, Israel and the Palestinian Authority, was a member of the peace delegation of distinguished jurists, diplomats, scholars, and religious leaders led by Cardinal McCarrick and Ambassador Tony Hall to Israel and Palestinian Authority. In 2010 (Princeton, NJ) Isaac co-sponsored with Princeton University, a dialogue on Yemen: Jews & Moslems - The Shared Cultural Heritage, with the hope of continuing to promote the peace dialogue between Jews and Moslems. And in 2010 (Basle, Switzerland) Isaac gave a talk on traditional peace activism, and Judaism as a member of a peace delegation at a meeting of Jews, Christians, and Iranian Ayatollahs, sponsored by PRIA Norwegian peace institute and the Catholic University of America.

== Publications ==
- From Abraham to Obama, A History of Jews, Africans, and African Americans (co-author with Harold Brackman of the Simon Wiesenthal Center), Africa World Press, 2015
- The Ethiopian Orthodox Tawahido Church. Trenton. The Red Sea Press. (2012)
- Editor (with Yosef Tobi). Judaeo-Arabic Studies: Proceedings of the Second International Congress of Yemenite Jewish Studies. University of Haifa & Institute of Semitic Studies. (1999)
- The History of Joseph, a Heretofore Unknown Apocryphal Work Translated from a Fourteenth Century Ethiopic (Ge'ez) Manuscript, with Introduction and Notes. Princeton Seminary Pseudepigrapha. Sheffield Academic Press. (1990)
- 1 Enoch: A New Translation and Introduction. In J. H. Charlesworth (ed.) The Old Testament Pseudoepigrapha, vol. 1, New York, Doubleday (1983), ISBN 0-385-09630-5, 5-89.
- A New-Text Critical Introduction to Mashafa Berhan. E. J. Brill (1973)
- The History of Joseph, (Princeton Seminary Pseudepigrapha, Sheffield Academic Press, 1990.)
- The Ethiopian Church. Boston. Henry Sawyer (1967, 1968)
- Co-editor, Journal of Afroasiatic Studies (1985–present)
- Over one hundred articles in academic journals on language, religion, and Ethiopian and general Semitic studies.

== In media ==
His work has been featured in several front-page stories, including three in The New York Times, three in the Trenton Times and The Record, and one editorial in the Washington Post. Other stories about his work have also appeared in the Boston Globe, the Chicago Tribune, The Christian Science Monitor, The Jerusalem Post, Shalom-European Jewish Times, The Jewish Week (New York), the Baltimore Jewish Times, numerous Ethiopian radio, television, and newspaper reports, and many other local and national papers throughout the United States of America, and the BBC.

== Recognition and awards ==
- Knight of the Royal Order of the Polar Star, First Class; conferred by the King of Sweden (5 December 2013)
- Morton Deutsch Conflict Resolution Prize, American Psychological Association, 2013
- Honorary D.Litt., Addis Ababa University, 2004
- Ethiopian "Interfaith Peace-Building Initiative Decree of Merit", 2004
- Peacemaker Award of the Rabbi Tanenbaum Center for Inter-religious Understanding, 2002
- Society for Ethiopians Established in Diaspora Education Award, 2002
- UN Association of Ethiopia Certificate of Appreciation, 2000
- The institution of the "Ephraim Isaac Prize for Excellence in African Studies" by Harvard University in 1999/2000
- Honorary D. H. L., John Jay College, CUNY, 1993
- National Honor Society of Secondary Schools Award, 1992
- American Philosophical Society Fellow, 1980–1981
- National Endowment for the Humanities Fellow, 1979–80
- Education Honor Society: Harvard Graduate School of Education, 1976
- Outstanding Educators of America Award, 1972
- Emperor Haile Selassie National High School Matriculation Prize, 1954
