= Mohammad Ali Tabatabaei Hassani =

Iraqi Grand Ayatollah (1945-2017)

Grand Ayatollah Sayed Mohammed Ali Tabatabai Al-Hassani
- Born: 1945; Iraq
- Died: February 2017 (aged 71–72); London
- Other names: سماحة المرجع الديني آية الله العظمى الحاج السيد محمد علي الطباطبائي الحسني
- Website: www.altabatabaey.com

Grand Ayatollah Sayed Mohammed Ali Tabatabai Al-Hassani (Arabic: السيد محمد علي الطباطبائي الحسني; 1945 – February 2017) was an Iraqi, Twelver Shia Muslim Marja'.

He studied in Shia Islamic seminaries of Karbala and Najaf, under Imam Khomeini, Sayed Abul-Qasim Al-Khoei, Sayed Mohammed Al-Shirazi, amongst others.

The Sayed also resided in countries such as Pakistan, Kuwait and Syria where he taught many students in the religious seminaries.

== Death ==
Mohammad Ali Tabatabaei Hassani died on February 1, 2017, and is buried in Najaf.

== See also ==
- List of maraji
