= Ali Haider Tabatabai =

Indian poet, translator, and scholar

Ali Haider Tabatabai (or Syed Ali Hyder Nazm Tabatabai) born 1854 in Awadh, died 1933 in Hyderabad Deccan, India, was a poet, translator and a scholar of languages. He descended from a long line of soldiers. He translated into Urdu Thomas Gray's "Elegy Written in a Country Churchyard".
