= Abu al-Qasim al-Khoei =

Iranian-Iraqi Shia marja' (1899–1992)

Grand Ayatollah Sayyid Abu al-Qasim Khoei
- ابوالقاسم الموسوي الخوئي
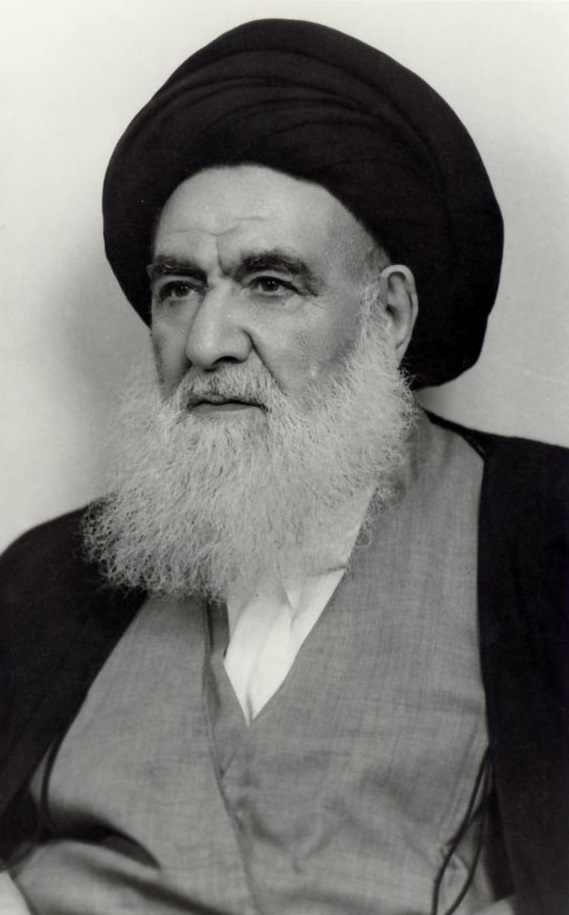
- Khoei in the 1970s

Personal life
- Born: November 19, 1899 Khoy, Sublime State of Persia
- Died: August 8, 1992 (aged 92) Kufa, Ba'athist Iraq
- Resting place: Imam Ali Shrine
- Children: Jamal al-Din; Ali; Abbas; Abd al-Sahib; Muhammad-Taqi; Abd al-Majid; Ibrahim
- Parent: Ali-Akbar Khoei (father)
- Main interest(s): Rijal, Hadith, Fiqh
- Notable work: Mu'jam rijal al-hadith
- Website: Official website

Religious life
- Religion: Islam
- Denomination: Twelver Shi'a
- Jurisprudence: Ja'fari
- Creed: Usuli

Muslim leader
- Teacher: Muhammad Hossein Gharavi; Muhammad Hussain Naini; Fethullah Qa'ravi Isfahani; Muhsin al-Hakim; Agha Zia ol Din Araghi
- Based in: Najaf, Iraq
- Period in office: 1970–1992
- Predecessor: Muhsin al-Hakim, Muhammad Hossein Gharavi, Muhammad Hussain al-Nai'ni
- Successor: Abd al-A'la Sabziwari, Mohammad-Reza Golpaygani, Ali al-Sistani

Abu al-Qasim al-Musawi al-Khoei (Arabic: أبو القاسم الموسوي الخوئي; Persian: ابوالقاسم موسوی خویی; November 19, 1899 – August 8, 1992) was a major Iranian-Iraqi Shia marja and dean of the Hawza of Najaf. Khoei was widely considered the most influential Twelver Shia Muslim scholar of his time.

After the death of Muhsin al-Hakim in 1970, he became the spiritual leader of much of the Shia world until his death in 1992. He was succeeded briefly by Abd al-A'la al-Sabziwari, until his death in 1993, after which his former student Ali al-Sistani, under the direction of Taqi al-Khoei, took leadership of the seminary, whereby many of his followers became followers of Sistani.

== Biography ==
=== Early life ===
Khoei was born to Shaykh Ali Akbar al-Musawi al-Khoei, a Sayyid of Iranian Azerbaijani origin, in the northern Iranian city of Khoy, West Azerbaijan in 1899. Khoei grew up in Qajar Iran. Around the age of 13, he and his family moved to Ottoman Iraq along with his older brother Abdullah, and took up residence in the holy city of Najaf, where he began studying Shia theology at the Hawza al-Ilmiyya, under Muhsin al-Hakim and Agha Zia ol Din Araghi.

=== Scholastic career ===
In Iraq, he received his first Ijazah 8 years later from Muhammad Hussain al-Naini at the age of 21, however he went on to further his studies at Isfahan Seminary, continuing researching for his risalah another 11 years.

At Isfahan, he went on to receive Ijazat from Muhammad Husayn Qaravi and Fethullah Isfahani among others, later attaining the rank of a qualified Jurist in 1933 at age 32, becoming a Marja shortly after having started teaching the Bahath al-Kharij. Khoei then continued to live in Najaf, becoming a teacher for the remainder of his life, and overseeing the studies of scholars who would be qualified to issue fatwas based on Shia jurisprudence.

Due to his prominent position as a teacher and scholar in Najaf, he became an important leader of worldwide Shias. He became the most prominent Grand Ayatollah in 1971 after the death of Muhsin al-Hakim. In this position, he became patron of numerous institutions across the globe that sought to provide welfare, social security and also scholarships to theological students from across the Muslim world.

He is considered as the architect of a distinct school of thought in the principles of jurisprudence and Islamic law, and one of the leading exponents of kalam (philosophy) and rijal (biography), fiqh (jurisprudence), and tafseer (exegesis). His scholastic rigor is exemplified by his 24 volume critical rijal work on The Four Books entitled Mu'jam Rijal Al-Hadith, which was a first for its time, and is generally considered to be his magnum opus. The work stirred up much controversy, for weakening many narrators relied on by scholars such as Muhammad Baqir al-Majlisi, including Mufaddhal ibn Umar, Ali ibn Al-Hussein ibn Shazawayh, al-Mo’addib, Ja’far ibn Muhammad ibn Masroor, Jabir ibn Yazid, Musa ibn Abdullah al-Nakhai and more. This tradition of writing Mu'jamat however, was only continued by one student of his, Grand Ayatollah Asif Mohseni, who wrote Mu'jam al-Ahadith al-Mu'tabara, and Mashra'a Bihar al-Anwar, which although being a commentary, employs al-Khoei's same methodology.

=== Final years ===
Khoei's status as the pre-eminent scholar of his age did not go unchallenged. In the 1970s, Grand Ayatollah Mohammed Shirazi, a radical theologian based in Karbala had a long-running feud with Al Khoei and his fellow clerics in Najaf over the legitimacy of theocratic rule, stemming from Khoei's close relationship with Ruhollah Khomeini, which he maintained despite being a quietist. The dispute resulted in Khoei seeking to dismiss Al Shirazi's status as a reliable religious scholar.

After the Persian Gulf War, Khoei was arrested by Saddam Hussein during the mass Shia uprising that followed the defeat of Iraqi forces. While under arrest, he was taken to Baghdad and made public appearances with Saddam Hussein. Hussein eventually allowed Khoei to return to Najaf, but remained under house arrest. Khoei died on 8 August 1992 in Najaf, at the age of 92. His funeral prayer was led by his student Ali Sistani. He was buried in the Shrine of Imam Ali in Najaf.

== Legacy ==
=== Welfare institutions ===
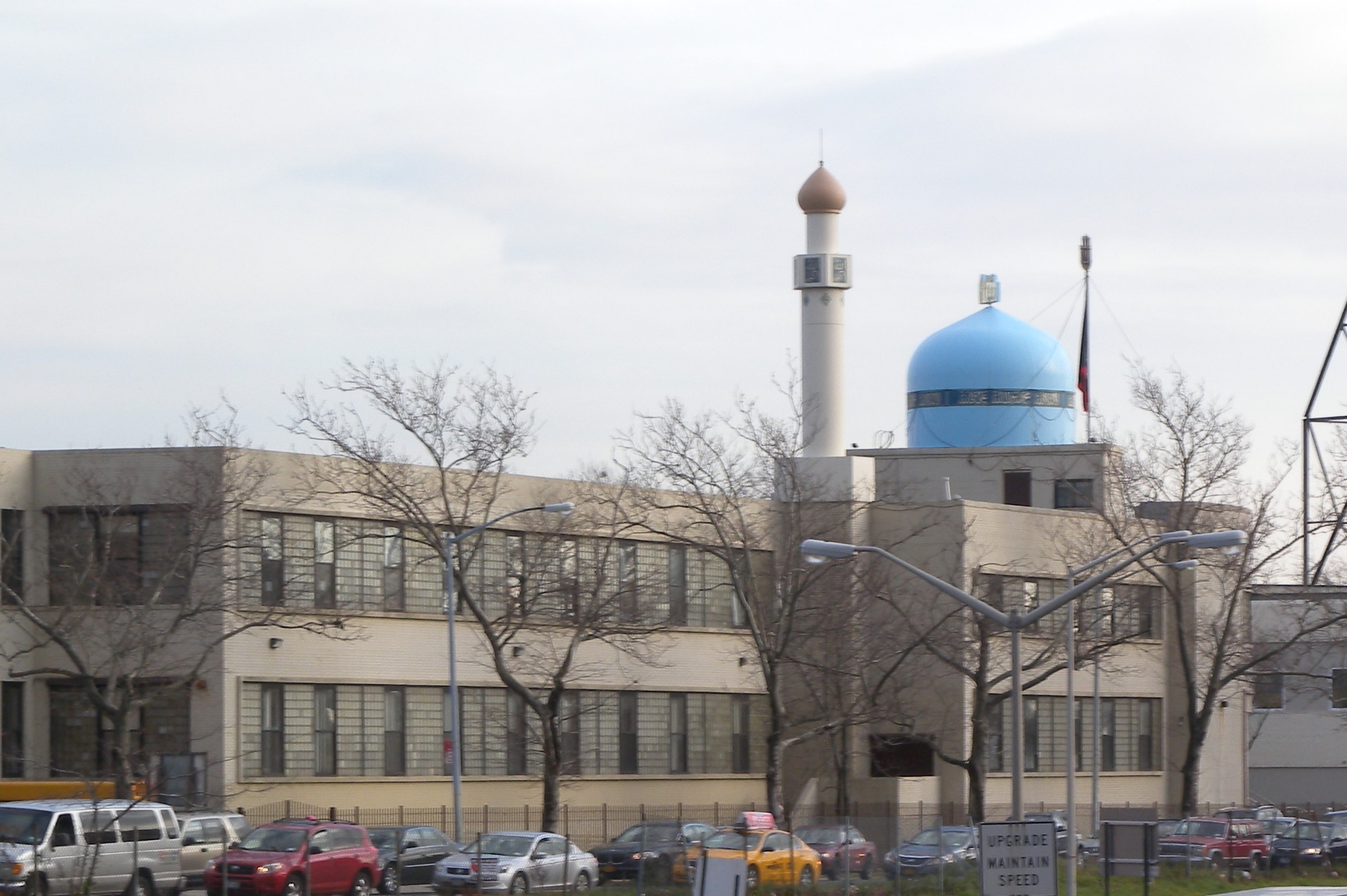
An Imam Khoei foundation building in New York.

He was fervently dedicated to establishing welfare, social, cultural, and educational institutions to protect Muslims worldwide, aiming to work in matters of Zakat, Sadaqah, Kaffarah, Fitr, Eidiyah and Isqat.

The following are some of the institutions he established:

- Imam Khoei Benevolent Foundation in Queens, NY.
- al-Iman School in Queens, New York.
- As-Sadiq and Az-Zahra Schools in London.
- Imam Khoei Islamic Centre (Welfare) in London, U.K
- Jamia-tul-Kauthar (School) in Islamabad.
- Darul Hikmah (School) in Najaf.
- Madinatul Ilm in Qom (School and Welfare). considered one of the biggest theology centres in the Shia world. The complex comprises the school building and living quarters capable of accommodating 500 families.
- As-Sayyid Khoei Centre (Welfare) in Bangkok.
- As-Sayyid Khoei Centre (Welfare) in Dhaka.
- Imam Khoei Orphanage (School and Welfare) in Beirut.
- Imam-e-Zamana Mission (Welfare) in Hyderabad.
- Najafi House (Welfare) in Mumbai.

He was also the patron of about 1,000 grant-maintained students of theology from Iraq and other countries like Lebanon, Iran, Syria, Persian Gulf States, India, Pakistan, Afghanistan, South East Asia. He provided financial support for maintaining the schools including boarding expenses, teachers' salaries, and lodging costs.

=== Students ===
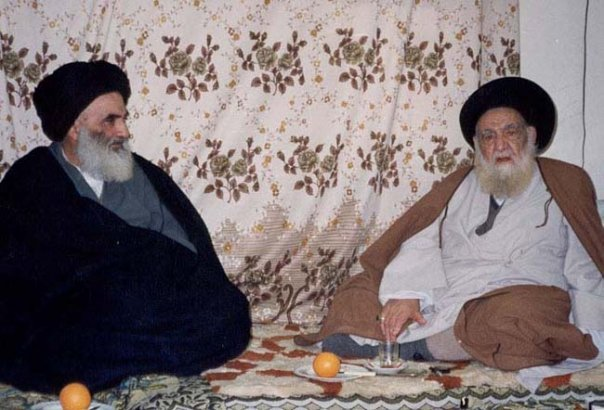
Khoei (right) with Ali Sistani (left)

Former student Ali Sistani is currently the most senior Shia cleric in Iraq and widely regarded as "wield[ing] enormous power over Iraq's Shia majority." The degree of success of his articulation of moderate Shia politics in Iraq have been said to be "in no small part traceable to the legacy of his mentor and teacher", Khoei.

Significant students of Khoei include Muhammad-Sadiq Rohani, Hossein Wahid Khorasani, Mohammad Hussein Fadlallah, Muhammad Baqir al-Sadr, Jawad Tabrizi, Kamal al-Haydari, Bashir al-Najafi, Mohammad Jamil Hammoud al-Amili and Muhammad Saeed al-Hakim.

=== Works ===
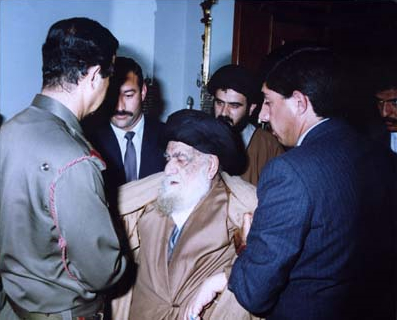
Ayatollah Khoei is brought in front of Saddam Hussein after Shia uprisings in 1991.

Khoei wrote about various topics, ranging from Islamic jurisprudence to mathematics and astronomy, having been known as a prolific writer in those disciplines. He wrote 37 books and treatises, most of which have been published. His works include:

- Lectures in the Principles of Jurisprudence – 10 volumes
- Mu'jam Rijal al-Hadith – 24 volumes
- Islamic Law – 18 volumes
- Al-Bayan Fi Tafsir al-Quran (The Elucidation of the Exegesis of The Qur'an and sometimes entitled The Prolegomena to the Quran)
- Minhaju-us-Saliheen (The Path of the Righteous) – 2 volumes, reprinted 78 times (guide book on religious practice and law)
- Anthology of Religious Questions – Concise version of the Path of the Righteous – in Arabic, Urdu, Persian, English, Turkish, Thai, Malay, Indonesian, and Gujarati
- Mabani al-Istinbat (Edifices of Deduction) Principles of Jurisprudence
- Ajwad-at-Taqrirat (The Best of Regulations) Principles of Jurisprudence
- Sharh-el-Urwatul-Wuthqa (Commentary on The Steadfast Handle) – Jurisprudence
- Treatise on Suspected Attire – Risala fil Libas Al-Mashkok, Evidential Jurisprudence
- Nafahat-ul Ijaz (The Fragrance of Miracles), in defence of the Qur'an

=== Internet ===
- Imam Khoei Benevolent Foundation

=== Political impact ===
Though the two shared an amicable formal relationship, Khoei was well-established as a competing Marja to Ruhollah Khomeini, starting from when the two both lived in Najaf. Khoei dismissed Khomeini's theory that Velayat-e faqih as the sole basis for Islamic Government, and according to Vali Nasr was even quoted as having called it a "bogus innovation." Nasr also argues that Khoei's importance in limiting the reach of Khomeini's ideas "is often underrated and unrecognized".

Although enthusiasm was passionate in the Shi'i world for the Iranian Revolution in its early years, Khoei championed the quietist position and "kept alive" the tradition of Shia thought "that accords more leeway to the idea of distinguishing between religious and political authority" and did so until enthusiasm for Islamist rule had lost much of its "allure" among Shia in Iraq. He is also given much of the credit for whatever influence "moderate Shia politics" has had in Iraq after the fall of Saddam Hussein through his mentee and student Ali Sistani who became the leading marjaʿ in Iraq after Khoei's death.

== Personal life ==
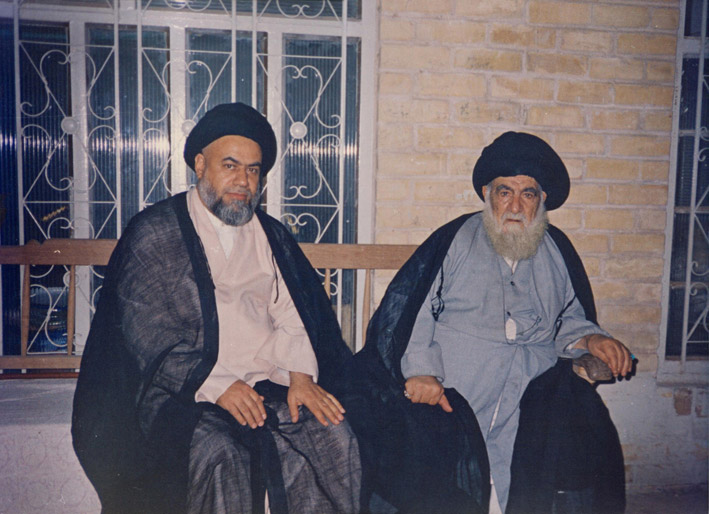
Khoei (right) with his son in law Jamal al-Din al-Imani

Khoei was married twice and had seven sons:

- Jamal al-Din al-Khoei He was Khoei's eldest son from his first wife, he spent his life in the service of his father's marja'iya. Jamal Al-Din was exiled to Damascus, Syria where he established a Hawza and continued his fathers teachings, he had notable students such as Sayed Muneer Al-Khabaz. Jamal al-Din died in Tehran after being diagnosed with cancer, in 1984. He was buried in the Fatimah Masumah shrine in Qom. His notable works are: Sharh Kifayat al-Usul, Bahth Fi al-Falsafa Wa Ilm al-Kalam, Sharh Diwan al-Mutanabi.
- Ali al-Khoei Adopted clerical life during his early years and graduated from Hawza in Najaf. He died in 1969 at the age of 32 in a car accident between Baghdad and Najaf.
- Abbas al-Khoei Born in Najaf, moved to Baghdād to find work at the age of 12. Learning his craft and eventually becoming a successful businessman owning five shops in Baghdād. Abbas was a forward thinker who spoke 6 languages fluently (English, Arabic, Farsi, Turkish, Urdu/Hindi, Azeri) he regularly travelled to the far east importing a variety of goods to Iraq for sale. After finding great entrepreneurial success, Abbas provided financial backing to his entire family taking them out of poverty. This was fundamental in allowing his father Khoei to concentrate on studying and teaching full time and publish his works. Abbas moved to London in 1978. Whilst in London Abbas served the Middle Eastern community, including sending his own children to interpret for sick patients at Kings College Hospital. Abbas died in July 2021 in Najaf at the age of 91.
- Abd Al-Sahib al-Khoei is the eldest son from the second wife and is the current Secretary-General of the Imam Khoei Foundation in London. He began his studies in Islamic jurisprudence at an early age in Najaf, before relocating to Iran to complete his religious education. Following the completion of his studies, Abd Al-Sahib decided to not adopt clerical life and pursued a career in business. For more than 30 years, he was involved in several commercial ventures in Iran, with a particular focus on the Persian carpet trade, where he was active in the Bazaars of Iran. In 2003, following the death of his younger brother Abd al-Majid Abd Al-Sahib adopted clerical life, wearing traditional Shia religious attire, and assumed the position of Secretary-General of the Imam Khoei Foundation, continuing the role previously held by his brother.
- Taqi al-Khoei He was the secretary general of the Foundation in 1989. He was placed under house arrest with his father after the 1991 Shaban uprising. Muhammad-Taqi was allegedly assassinated by Saddam Hussein, who set up a car accident, on the night of 21 July 1994. Besides reports of his father's lectures, he has authored Kitab al-Iltizamat al-Taba'iya Fi al-Uqud.
- Abd al-Majid al-Khoei He emigrated from Iraq soon after the Shaban uprising and left for London. He became the secretary-general of the Foundation after his brother, Muhammad-Taqi's death. Soon after the fall of Baghdad to US forces in 2003, he returned to Iraq with plans to revive Najaf to the glory and splendour it enjoyed under the patronage of his father. However, he was assassinated on April 10, 2003, near the Imam Ali Mosque in Najaf.
- Ibrahim al-Khoei He was abducted from his house by the Baathist regime after the Shaban uprising, in 1991.

== See also ==
- Muhammad Hossein Gharavi
- Muhammad Hossein Naini
- Ruhollah Khomeini
- Abd al-A'la Sabziwari
- Mohammad-Reza Golpaygani
- Ali Sistani
