= Ali Tabatabaei (actor) =

Iranian actor (1983–2015)

- علی طباطبایی
- Born: October 24, 1983; Tehran, Iran
- Died: August 30, 2015 (aged 31); Tehran, Iran
- Occupation: Actor
- Years active: 2004–2015

Ali Tabatabaei (Persian: علی طباطبایی) (24 October 1983 – 30 August 2015) was an Iranian film and television actor.

== Personal life ==
Tabatabaei was born in Tehran in 1983 and was the son of Iranian film and television producer Kamal Tabatabaei. He died in 2015 at the age of 32 by heart attack.

== Filmography ==
=== Cinema ===
- Salad Fasl
- Sa'at 25
- Asbe Sefid Padeshah

=== TV Series ===
- Bajenagh'ha
- Taraneh Madari
- Ashpaz Bashi
- Bachehaye Nesbatan Bad
- Ghalbe Yakhi
