= Imam Ali Shrine =

Mosque and mausoleum of Ali

Shrine of Imam Ali
- حَرَم ٱلْإِمَام عَلِيّ
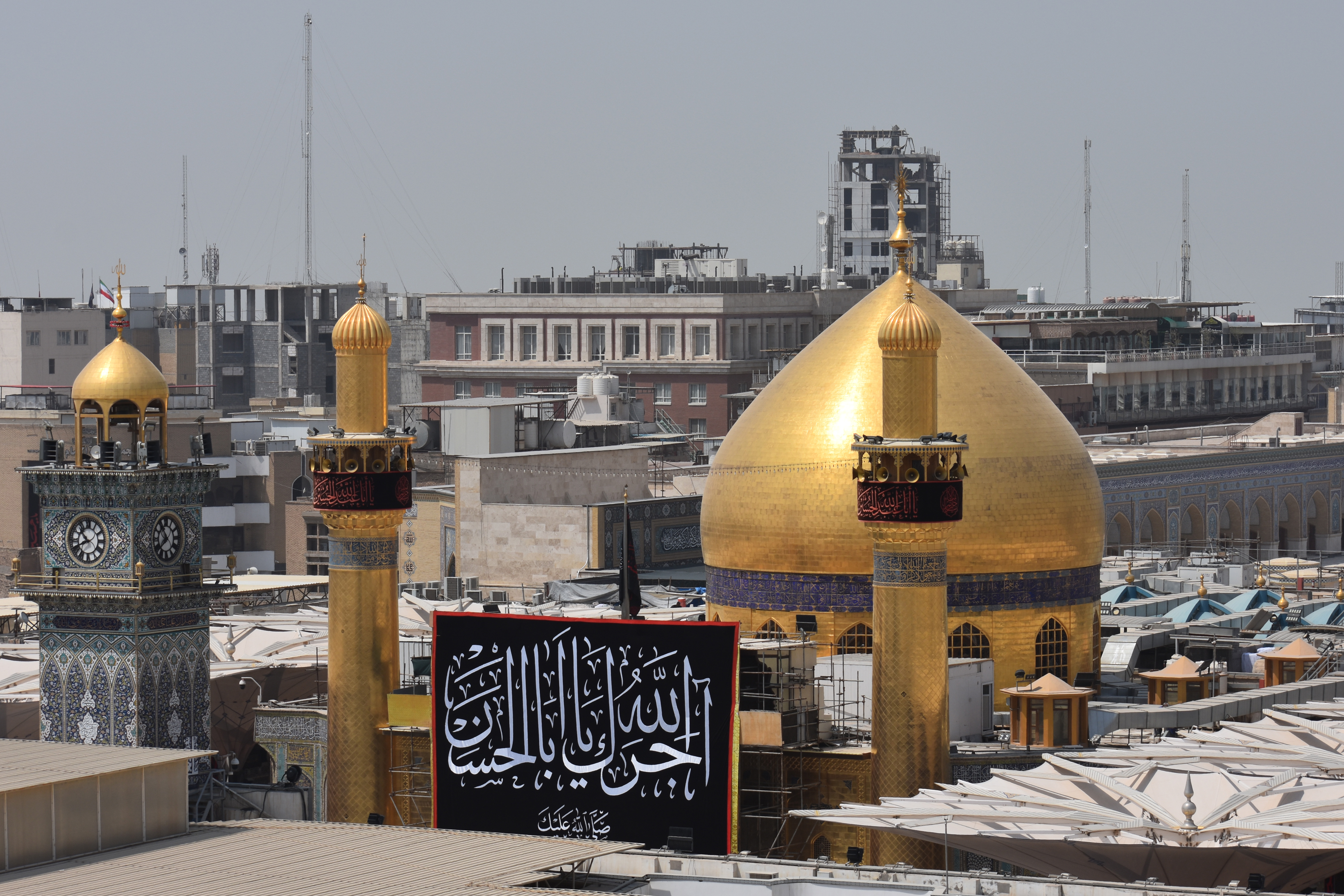
- The shrine, where Ali is believed to be buried

- Location of the shrine in Iraq

Religion
- Affiliation: Islam
- Ecclesiastical or organisational status: Shrine
- Status: Active

Location
- Location: Najaf, Najaf Governorate
- Country: Iraq
- Coordinates: 31°59′45″N 44°18′53″E

Architecture
- Type: Shi’i mosque
- Style: Islamic architecture
- Groundbreaking: 1621 CE
- Completed: 1630 CE

Specifications
- Dome: One
- Dome height (inner): 42 m (138 ft)
- Minaret: Two
- Minaret height: 38 m (125 ft)
- Shrine: One: Ali ibn Abi Talib
- Materials: Ceramic tiles; gold; copper

Website
- imamali.net

The Imam Ali Shrine (Arabic: حَرَم ٱلْإِمَام عَلِيّ, romanized: Ḥaram al-ʾImām ʿAlī), also known as the Mosque of Ali (Arabic: مَسْجِد عَلِيّ, romanized: Masjid ʿAlī), is a Shi'ite mosque and shrine, located in Najaf, in the Najaf Governorate of Iraq. The site is a mausoleum which Shia and Sunni Muslims believe contains the tomb of Ali ibn Abi Talib, a cousin, son-in-law and companion of the Islamic prophet Muhammad.

The Shias consider Ali as their first Imam and Muhammad’s rightful successor, while the Sunnis regard him as the fourth Sunni Rashid Caliph. According to Shia belief, buried next to Ali within this mosque are the remains of Adam and Nuh (Noah). Each year, millions of pilgrims visit the shrine and pay tribute to Imam Ali. The shrine has been built and rebuilt numerous times throughout history.

== History ==
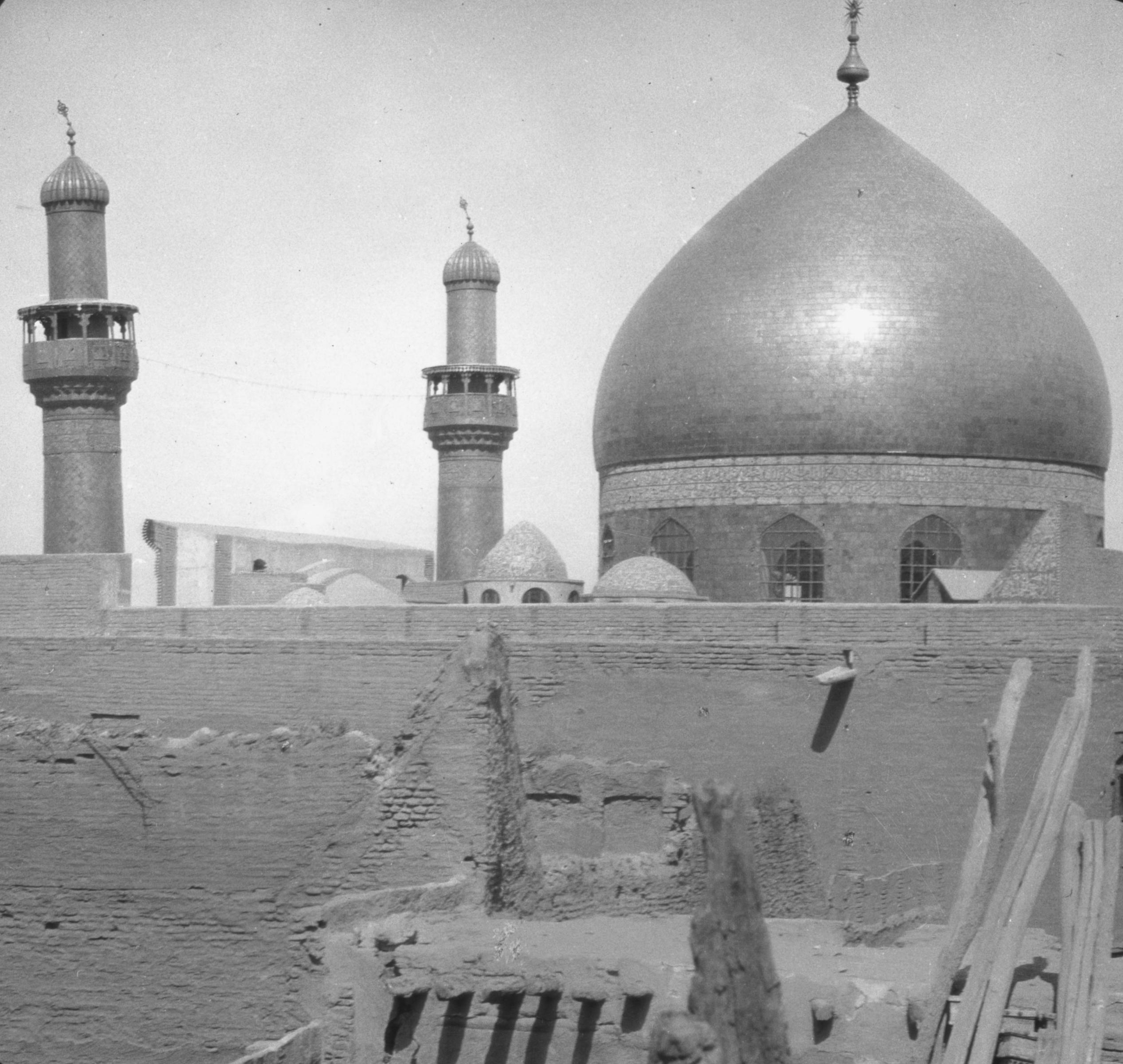
The Shrine of Imam Ali with its mosque, dome, and minarets in 1932

The Abbasid caliph Harun al-Rashid built the first structure over the tomb of Imam Ali in 786 CE, which included a green dome. The Abbasid caliph al-Mutawakkil flooded the site in 850, but in the 10th century Abu'l-Hayja, the Hamdanid ruler of Mosul and Aleppo, rebuilt the shrine in 923, which included a large dome. In 979–980, the Shi'ite Buyid emir 'Adud al-Dawla expanded the shrine, which included a cenotaph over the burial site and a new dome. This included hanging textiles and carpets. He also protected Najaf with a wall and citadel, while providing water from the Euphrates via a qanat.

The Seljuq sultan Malik-Shah I contributed large gifts to the shrine in 1086, as did Caliph Al-Nasir.

The vizier Shams al-Din Juvayni added facilities to serve the pilgrims in 1267, and the sultan Ghazan Khan added the Dar al-Siyada wing for the sayyids in 1303.

Ibn Battuta visited the shrine in 1326, noting that it was "carpeted with various sorts of carpets of silk and other materials, and contains candelabra of gold and silver, large and small." Between the three tombs, "are dishes of gold and silver, containing rose-water, musk and various kinds of perfumes. The visitor dips his hand in this and anoints his face with it for a blessing." A fire destroyed the shrine in 1354, but it was rebuilt around 1358 by the Jalairid sultan Shaikh Awais Jalayir. He also interred his father's remains, Hasan Buzurg in the courtyard. Timur ordered the restoration of the shrine after a visit to Najaf. Suleiman the Magnificent also offered gifts, which probably helped restore the shrine, after a visit in 1534. The Safavid Shah Ismail I visited in 1508, but it was Abbas I who visited Najaf twice and commissioned 500 men to rebuild the shrine in 1623. The restoration was completed by his grandson Shah Safi al-Din in 1632. This restoration included a new dome, expanded courtyard, a hospital, kitchen, and hospice, so as to accommodate the numerous pilgrims. The cenotaph was restored in 1713 and the dome stabilized in 1716.

In 1742, Nader Shah gilded the dome and minaret, and this was chronicled by Nasrallah al-Haeri in his famous poem, iḏhā ḍhāmak al-dahra yawman wa jārā (Arabic: إذا ضامك الدهر يوماً وجارا). Nader Shah's wife paid for the walls and courtyard to be rebuilt and the retiling of the iwan faience. In 1745, the iwan was rebuilt as a gilt muqarnas of nine tiers. In 1791, a raised stone floor covered the tombs in the courtyard, creating a cellar space for them.

The first European visitors included Carsten Niebuhr in 1765, William Loftus in 1853, and Johann Ludwig Burckhardt in 1864. The Ottoman emperor Abdülaziz rebuilt the Clock Portal (Bab al-Sa'a) and the Portal of Muslim Ibn 'Aqil in 1863 and the former gilded in 1888 by the Qajar sultan Naser al-Din Shah Qajar. In 1886, Sultan Naser al-Din, also repaired the dome because there were breaks in it due to the weather.

=== Independent Iraq ===
During the uprising of March 1991, following the Persian Gulf War, Saddam Hussein's Republican Guards damaged the shrine, where members of the Shia opposition were cornered, in storming the shrine and massacring virtually all its occupants. Afterwards, the shrine was closed for two years, officially for repairs. Saddam Hussein also deported to Iran a large number of the residents of the area who were of Iranian descent.

In the three years after the 2003 invasion of Iraq by the U.S. military, a number of violent incidents occurred at the mosque:

- April 10, 2003: former Saddam Hussein era custodian Haydar Al-Killidar Al-Rufaye and anti-Saddam Shia leader Sayed Abdul Majid al-Khoei, the son of Grand Ayatollah Abu al Qasim al-Khoei, were killed by a mob near the mosque. Al-Khoei had returned from exile in Britain to encourage cooperation with the U.S.-led occupation of Iraq.
- August 29, 2003: the 2003 Imam Ali Shrine bombing. A car bomb exploded outside the mosque just as the main Friday prayers were ending. Somewhere between 85 and 125 people were killed, including the influential Ayatollah Sayed Mohammed Baqir al-Hakim, the Shia leader of the Supreme Council for the Islamic Revolution in Iraq. The blast is thought to be the work of Abu Musab al-Zarqawi.
- May 24, 2004: unidentified mortar fire hit the shrine, damaging gates which lead to the tomb of Imam Ali.
- August 5, 2004: Muqtada al-Sadr and the Mahdi Army seized the mosque and used it as a military base for launching attacks against the Iraqi police, the provincial government and coalition forces. The fighting was eventually ended by a peace agreement. Neighbouring buildings suffered considerable damage, but the mosque itself suffered only superficial damage from stray bullets and shrapnel.
- August 10, 2006: a suicide bomber blew himself up near the shrine, killing 40 people and injuring more than 50 others.

== Architecture and decoration ==
Numerous structures have existed over the tomb of Imam Ali since its discovery during the rule of Harun al Rashid in the 8th century. The current structure though dates back to the Safavid period in the 17th century and was designed by the famous polymath Baha' al-din al-'Amili. The shrine consists of the central tomb chamber topped by a large double shell onion-shaped dome 42 metres (138 ft) high, and flanked by twin 38-metre-tall (125 ft) minarets. The inner shell of the dome is visible from the inside of the tomb chamber while the monumental outer shell is visible from the courtyard of the shrine and throughout the city. The inside of the tomb chamber and its surrounding halls are ornamented with an array of mirror mosaics, most of which has been replaced over the years and are not original. The ceramic mosaics that adorn the inner shell of the dome however are original and date back to the original construction of the shrine during the Safavid period. At the front of the shrine stands a large golden iwan flanked by two minarets. The monumental dome, iwan, and minarets are adorned with gold coated copper plates, though they were originally adorned with green and blue ceramic tiles in the typical Safavid fashion. The gilding of the shrines dome and façade elements occurred in 1743 under the orders of the Iranian king Nader Shah Afshar and his wife Razia Begum. The golden iwan, dome, and minarets contains numerous inscriptions in Persian, Arabic, and Azeri Turkish with poems in praise of Ali ibn Abi Talib inscriptions chronicling the gilding of the shrine by Nader Shah. The left and right side walls of the shrine are ornamented with cuerda seca tile panels most of which date from either the 18th or 19th centuries. Imam Ali's shrine is among the last of the Shi'ite shrines in Iraq to retains its nearly full set of original antique tiles.

Around the shrine on its North, East, and Southern sides is a large courtyard surrounded by pointed arch arcades, while the shrine is linked on the West to the Al-Ra's Mosque. The courtyard arcades are two floors in height and contain various small chambers historically used as dormitory rooms for seminary students, today most are used as administrative offices. The Al-Ras mosque (literally "The Head Mosque") is oriented in the direction of the head of Ali Ibn Abi Talib's grave. The original Al-Ras mosque is said to have dated from the Ilhanate period in 14th century however it was demolished in 2005 by the shrine's administration and rebuilt in a modern style using contemporary construction materials and methods. Local architectural historians and preservationists have argued the destruction of the original Al-Ras mosque destroyed an important part of the shrine's architectural heritage and the introduction of modern construction methods and materials has damaged the architectural integrity of the shrine. The original Ilkhanate era mihrab of the Al-Ras mosque underwent restoration in 2023 after having been kept in storage for 18 years and will be put on display in the shrine's museum.

Entrance to the shrine is through three main monumental iwans on the eastern, northern and southern sides, called the Main or Clock Portal, al-Tusi Portal and the Qibla Portal respectively. There are two additional monumental portals, the Portal of Muslim Ibn 'Aqil, north of the Clock Gate, and the al-'Amara, or al-Faraj Portal, at the southwestern corner. The most notable of these entry portals is the Clock Portal (Iwan-i-Sa'at) and is topped by a tall clock tower ornamented with mosaic tiles. The clock mechanism and its bells were produced in Manchester, England and brought to the shrine in 1887, this is visible on iron engravings on the bells.

== Religious significance and precincts ==
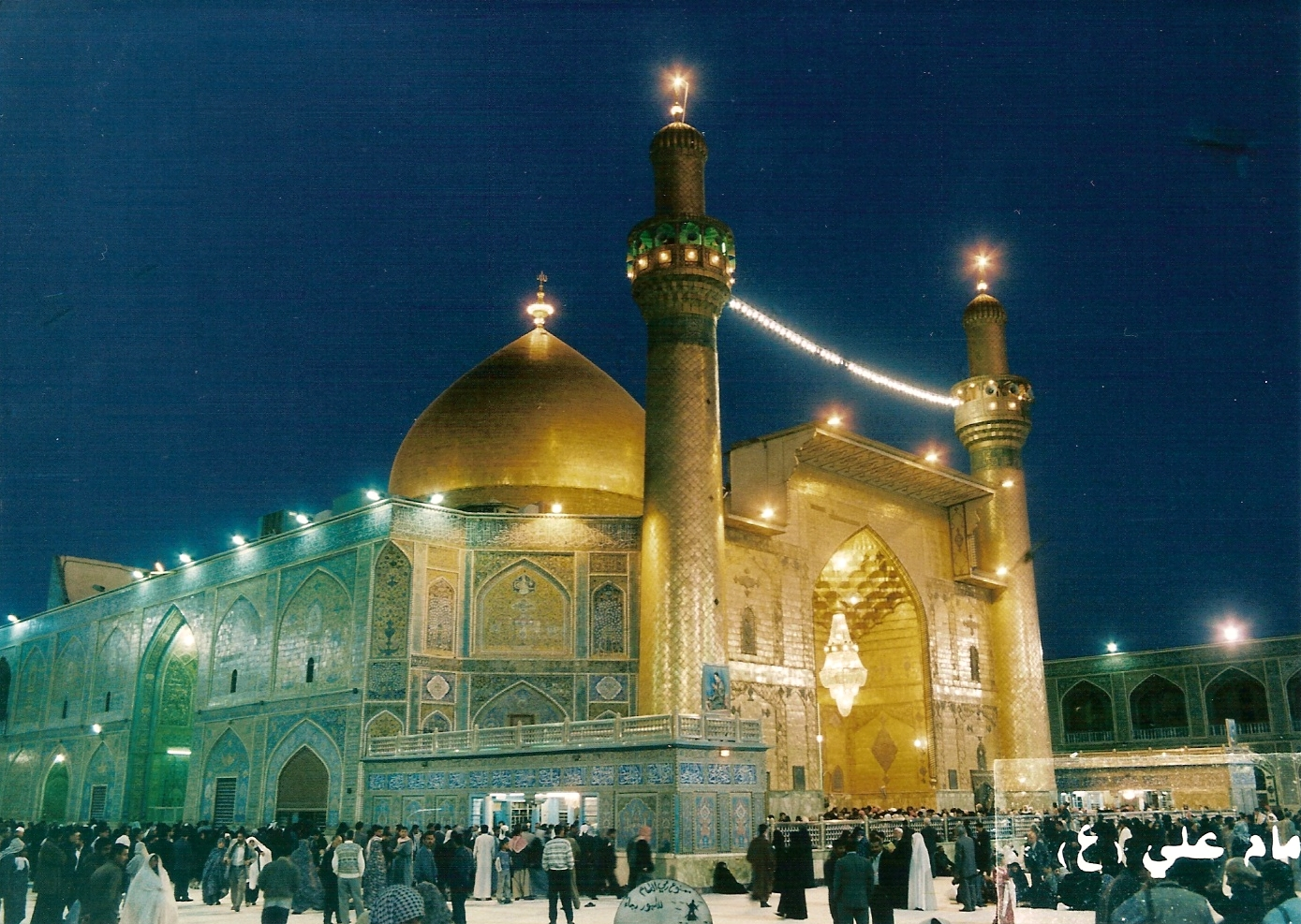
The Shrine of Imam Ali in 2005

As the burial site of one of Islam's most important figures, the Shrine of Imam Ali is considered by all Shia Muslims as the fourth holiest Islamic site. The Boston Globe reported "for the Muslim Shias, Najaf is the fourth holiest city, behind Mecca and Medina in Saudi Arabia and Al-Aqsa Mosque in Palestine." It is estimated that only Mashhad, Karbala, Mecca, and Medina receive more Muslim pilgrims. A hadith attributed to Ja'far as-Sādiq, the Sixth Shī'ite Imām, mentions the site as one of "five definitive holy places that we respect very much".

The site is visited annually by at least 8 million pilgrims on average, which is estimated to increase to 20 million in years to come. Many Shiites believe that Ali did not want his grave to be desecrated by his enemies and consequently asked his friends and family to bury him secretly. This secret gravesite is supposed to have been revealed later during the Abbasid Caliphate by al-Sādiq. Most Shī'ites accept that Ali is buried in Imām Ali Mosque, in the city of Najaf, which grew around the shrine. Many hadiths from the Shia Imams and from Muhammad highlight the importance of pilgrimage to this shrine.

Muhammad: "There is no sword but Zulfiqar, and there is no hero but Ali. Whoever visits Ali while he is alive, it is as if he has visited me; and whoever visits him after his death, it is as if he has visited me during my lifetime."

== Gallery ==
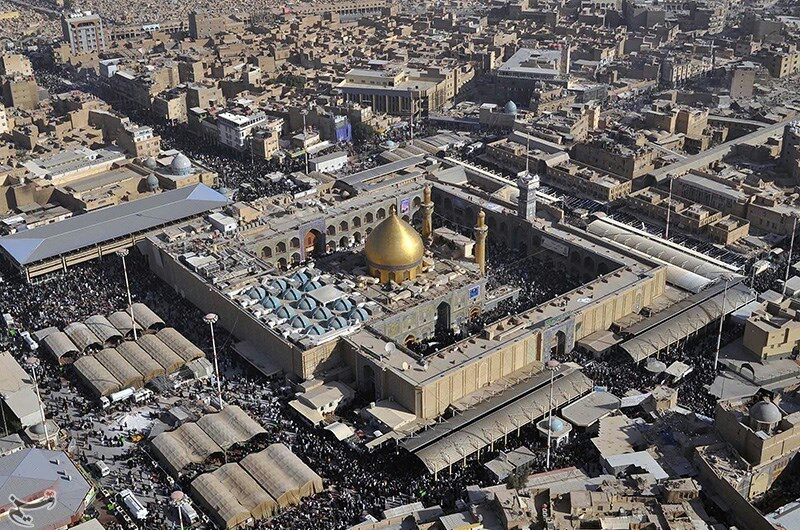
An aerial view of the mosque

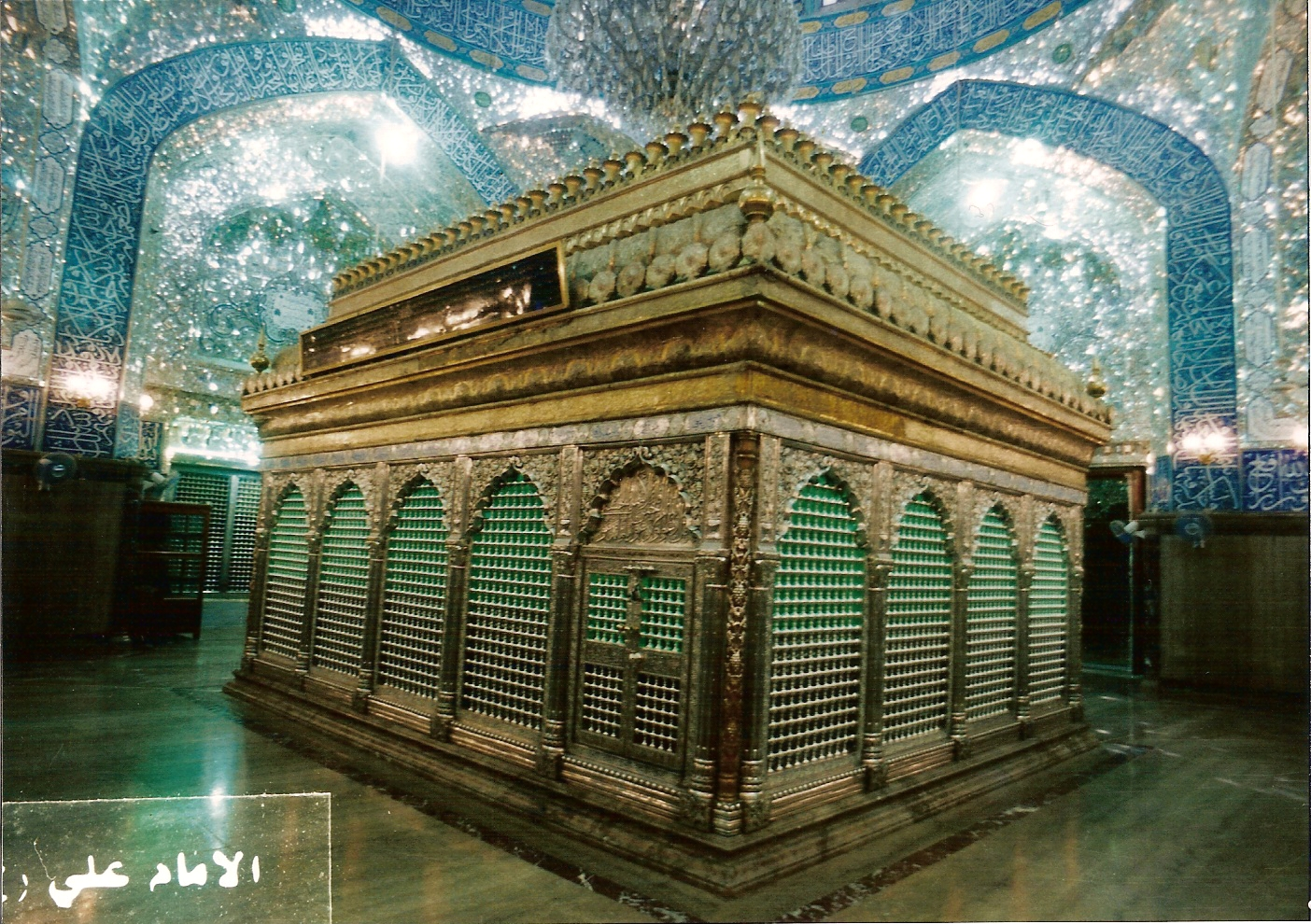
Zarih covering the qabr (grave) of Imam Ali

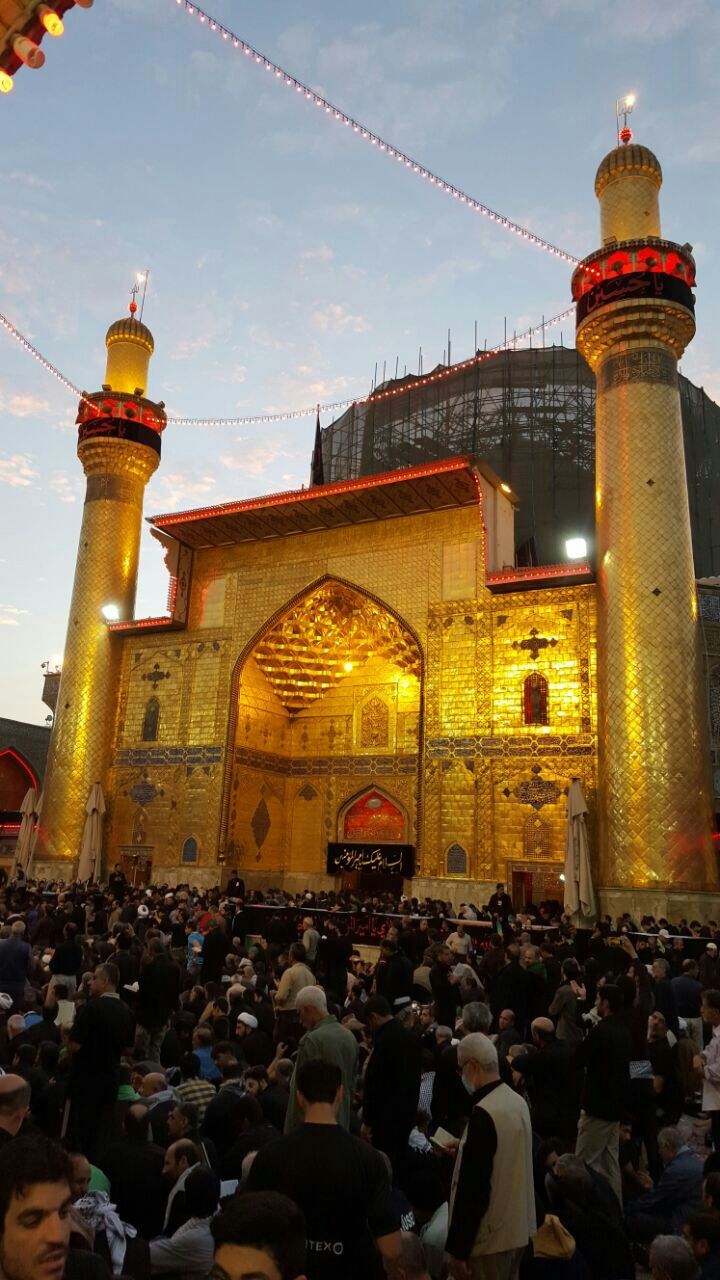
The golden iwan of the Imam Ali Shrine

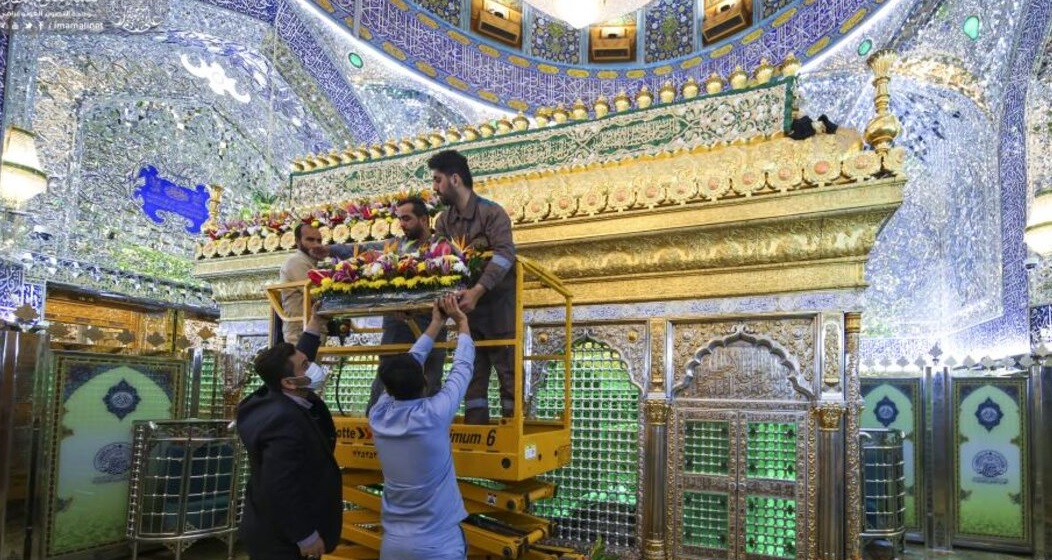
Flower arrangement of the shrine of Imam Ali on the eve of his birth

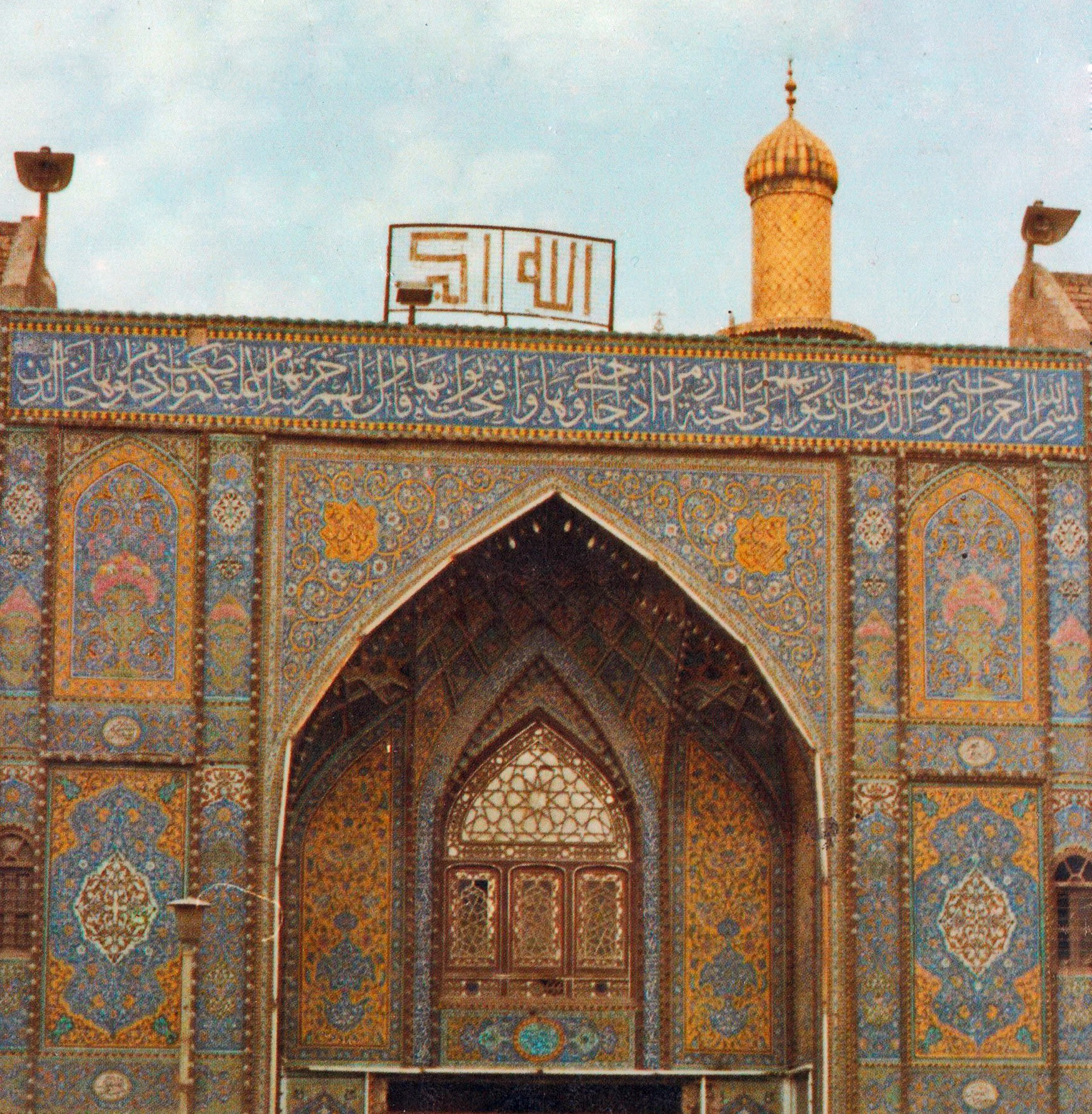
Imam Ali Shrine in 1994

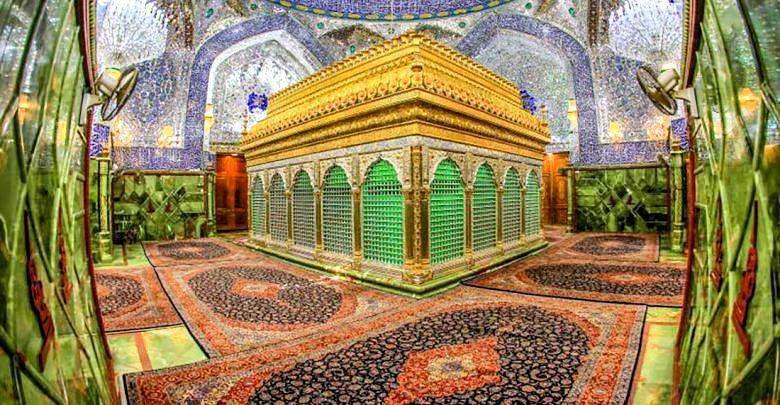
Inside the Imam Ali Shrine

The entrance gate to the tomb of Imam Ali

== See also ==
- Holiest sites in Shia Islam
- List of mosques in Iraq
- Shia Islam in Iraq
