= Muhsin al-Hakim =

Iraqi theologian and religious authority (1889–1970)

Grand Ayatullah, Sayyid Muhsin al-Hakim
- محسن الحكيم
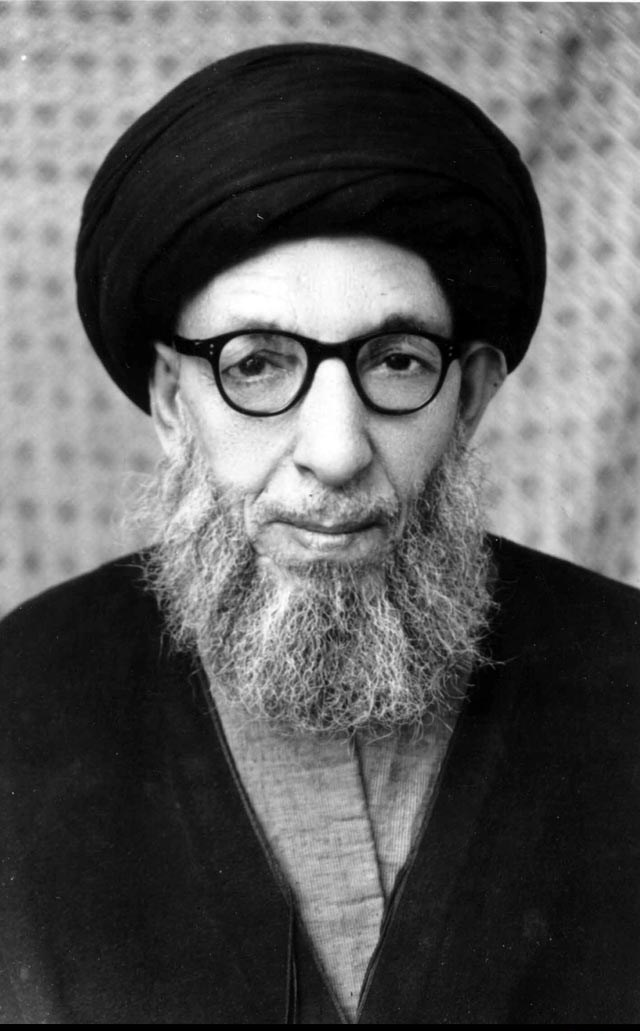

Personal life
- Born: 31 May 1889 Najaf, Ottoman Iraq
- Died: 2 June 1970 (aged 81) Najaf, Ba'athist Iraq
- Resting place: Imam Ali Shrine

Religious life
- Religion: Islam
- Denomination: Twelver Shi'a
- Jurisprudence: Jaʽfari

Muslim leader
- Based in: Najaf, Iraq
- Period in office: 1961–1970
- Predecessor: Hossein Borujerdi
- Successor: Abu al-Qasim al-Khoei

Muhsin al-Tabataba'i al-Hakim (Arabic: محسن الطباطبائي الحكيم, romanized: Muḥsin al-Ṭabāṭabāʾī al-Ḥakīm; 31 May 1889 – 2 June 1970) was an Iraqi Shia religious authority. He became the leading marja' of Najaf in 1946 after the death of Abu al-Hasan al-Isfahani, and of the majority of the Shia world in 1961, after the death of Hossein Borujerdi. He died in 1970.

== Biography ==
=== Early life ===
Muhsin al-Hakim was born on May 31, 1889, in the city of Najaf, Ottoman Iraq. He belongs to the al-Hakim family, whose roots go back to Jabal Amil in southern Lebanon, a region known for its long association with Twelver Shia Islam. The family was so named because one of his ancestors, Ali, was a famous physician. His father, Mahdi al-Hakim, was a well-known teacher of ethics of his time, while his mother was the granddaughter of the Shiite jurist Abdul Nabi al-Kadhimi. He had two brothers: Hashim al-Hakim and Mahmoud al-Hakim.

He completed his primary and introductory studies, then began higher students under some of the most respected scholars of his time. When he reached the age of twenty, he began to study under the hands of the great religious authorities, such as: Mohammed Kazem Yazdi, Muhammad Kazim Khurasani, Agha Zia ol Din Araghi, Abu Turab al-Khunsari, Fethullah Qa'ravi Isfahani, Muhammad Hussain Naini, Muhammad Sa'id al-Habboubi, and Ali Baqir al-Jawahiri.

=== Leading Iraqi marja' ===
In 1961, Mohsen al-Hakim succeeded Abu l-Hasan al-Isfahani and was the second most important Shia authority in the world. He then became the general Shia authority after the death of Hossein Borujerdi. He set up an administrative system for the seminary and began building schools and sending missionaries to different parts of Iraq. Through this work, the number of students in all seminaries increased. To enrich the curriculum at the seminary in Najaf, al-Hakim introduced new courses such as exegesis (Tafsir), economics, philosophy, and theology. This aimed to broaden students' horizons in various sciences, thus preparing them to confront the intellectual trends and new ideas coming from abroad. He encouraged all those with the ability and aptitude to write and compose, such as Al-Adwaa, Risalat Al-Islam, Al-Najaf, and others. Al-Hakim was determined to maintain the prestige of his native city of Najaf, one of the holiest cities of Shia Islam, and on the occasion of the Feyziyeh School protests in 1963, he invited several Iranian clerics in Qom to relocate to Iraq, though without much success.

Muhsin al-Hakim had fourteen children from his marriages: ten sons and four daughters. Many of his sons were subsequently executed by the Ba'athist Iraqi government.

=== Death ===
Muhsin al-Hakim died on June 2, 1970, at the age of 81, in his hometown of Najaf. He was recognized as the most influential Shia authority upon his death, following which Abu al-Qasim Khoei became the most prominent Grand Ayatollah in Iraq.

== See also ==
- Aqa Najafi Quchani
- Hakim family
- Najaf Seminary
- Abbas Quchani

== Sources ==
- Shiite Notables. Mohsen Al-Amin, printed in Beirut, Lebanon. Date of publication missing. Published by Dar Al-Ta'aruf.
- The Means to Shiite Classifications. Agha Buzurg al-Tehrani, Beirut - Lebanon edition, 1403 AH / 1983 AD, Dar al-Adwaa Publications.
