= 1991 Iraqi uprisings =

Anti-government uprisings in Ba'athist Iraq

- Part of the aftermath of the Gulf War
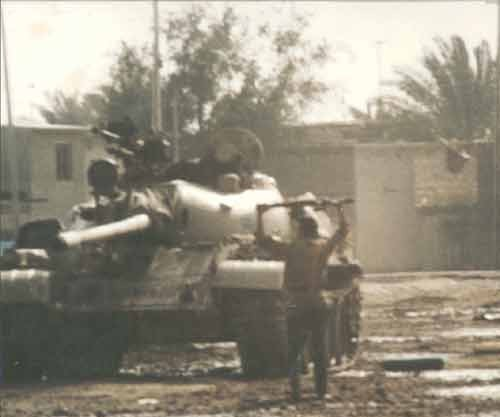
- An Iraqi Army T-55 tank disabled by rebels
Date	1 March – 5 April 1991
Location	Iraq
Result	Iraqi government military victory
Territorial changes	Establishment of Kurdistan Region as a de facto autonomous region, facilitated by the imposition of no-fly zones over northern Iraq by the United States, United Kingdom and France following uprising.

Belligerents
Government; Ba'ath Party; Iraqi Armed Forces; Iraqi Army; Republican Guard; Popular Army; Directorate of General Security; Iraqi Intelligence Service; Iraqi Special Security Organization	Shia and leftist opposition; Islamic Supreme Council of Iraq/Badr Brigades; Islamic Dawa Party; Iraqi Communist Party; (Iraq) Pro-Syrian Ba'athists; Army deserters/defectors; Kurdish rebels: Peshmerga: Kurdistan Democratic Party; Patriotic Union of Kurdistan; Kurdistan Islamic Movement; Communist Party of Kurdistan; Jash deserters/defectors; Democratic Party of Iranian Kurdistan
	Diplomatic support: United States; Military support: Iran

Commanders and leaders
Saddam Hussein (Commander-in-Chief); Izzat Ibrahim al-Douri; Hussein Kamel; Ali Hassan al-Majid; Taha Yasin; Tariq Aziz; Qusay Hussein	Mohammad Baqir (Commander-in-Chief); Abdul Aziz al-Hakim; Hadi al-Amiri (Iraq) Fawzi Mutlaq al-Rawi Massoud Barzani; Jalal Talabani

Strength
c. 300,000	c. 59,000–107,000: SCIRI: c. 40,000–50,000; KDP: c. 15,000–45,000; PUK: c. 4,000–12,000

Casualties and losses
c. 5,000 killed	c. 25,000–180,000 killed (mostly civilians)

The 1991 Iraqi uprisings were ethnic and religious uprisings against Saddam Hussein's Ba'athist regime that were mainly led by Shia and Kurdish rebels. The uprisings lasted from March to April 1991 after a ceasefire following the end of the Gulf War. The mostly uncoordinated insurgency was fueled by the perception that Iraqi President Saddam Hussein had become vulnerable to regime change. This perception of weakness was largely the result of the outcome of the Iran–Iraq War and the Gulf War, both of which occurred within a single decade and devastated the population and economy of Iraq.

Within the first two weeks, most of Iraq's cities and provinces fell to rebel forces. Participants in the uprising were of diverse ethnic, religious and political affiliations, including military mutineers, Shia Islamists, Kurdish nationalists, Kurdish Islamists, and far-left groups. Following initial victories, the uprising was prevented from making further progress by internal divisions as well as a lack of anticipated American and Iranian support. Saddam's Sunni Arab-dominated Ba'ath Party regime managed to maintain control over the capital of Baghdad and soon largely suppressed the rebels in a brutal campaign conducted by loyalist forces spearheaded by the Iraqi Republican Guard.

Pursuing another Security Council resolution, the United States established the Iraqi no-fly zones and formed a Western coalition to aid Kurds who had fled to Turkey. The coalition ultimately pressured Saddam to withdraw from most of Iraqi Kurdistan (except Kirkuk), after which the autonomous Kurdistan Region was established. However, they fell into a civil war until a US-brokered ceasefire in September 1998. By contrast, Saddam viewed the Shia revolt in the south as "the most dangerous threat to his regime, and even to the continued existence of Iraq" as the Shia Arabs were the majority. The Iraqi government intensified a prior systematic forced relocation of Marsh Arabs and the draining of the Mesopotamian Marshes, and Saddam's suppression of the Shia revolt was considerably more brutal. The United States did not assist the Shia Arabs as it assisted the Kurds, leaving a legacy of mistrust among the Shia Arabs. Thousands of Iraqis detained during the suppression of the uprising remained unaccounted for. Iraqi government forces killed thousands of unarmed civilians through indiscriminate attacks, summary executions and helicopter attacks.

== Earlier calls for uprising ==
During the Iran–Iraq War, Iran's supreme leader, Ruhollah Khomeini, called on Iraqi Shias to overthrow the Ba'ath government and establish an Islamic state. Because of his incitement, many Shia Arabs were driven out of Iraq and some were recruited into armed militias backed by Iran, although the majority remained loyal to Iraq throughout the duration of the war.

== U.S. radio broadcasts ==
On February 15, 1991, President of the United States, George H. W. Bush, made a speech targeting Iraqis via Voice of America radio. Hoping to incite a swift military coup to topple Saddam Hussein, Bush stated:

There is another way for the bloodshed to stop: and that is, for the Iraqi military and the Iraqi people to take matters into their own hands and force Saddam Hussein, the dictator, to step aside and then comply with the United Nations' resolutions and rejoin the family of peace-loving nations.

Bush made a similar appeal on March 1, a day after the end of the Gulf War:

In my own view...the Iraqi people should put [Saddam] aside, and that would facilitate the resolution of all these problems that exist and certainly would facilitate the acceptance of Iraq back into the family of peace-loving nations.

On the evening of February 24, four days before the Gulf War ceasefire was signed, the Voice of Free Iraq radio station, allegedly funded and operated by the CIA, broadcast a message to the Iraqi people telling them to rise up and overthrow Saddam. The speaker on the radio was Salah Omar al-Ali, an exiled former member of the Ba'ath Party and the Ba'athist Revolutionary Command Council. Al-Ali's message urged the Iraqis to overthrow the "criminal tyrant of Iraq" and asserted that Saddam "will flee the battlefield when he becomes certain that the catastrophe has engulfed every street, every house and every family in Iraq." He said:

Rise to save the homeland from the clutches of dictatorship so that you can devote yourself to avoiding the dangers of the continuation of the war and destruction. Honorable Sons of the Tigris and Euphrates, at these decisive moments of your life, and while facing the danger of death at the hands of foreign forces, you have no option in order to survive and defend the homeland but put an end to the dictator and his criminal gang.

== Revolution ==
=== Southern uprisings ===
Many of the rebels in southern Iraq, where the uprisings began, were either demoralized soldiers of the Iraqi Army or members of anti-regime groups, in particular the Islamic Dawa Party and Supreme Council for the Islamic Revolution in Iraq (SCIRI). Iraqi armed forces were composed largely of Shia conscripts and contained substantial anti-regime elements, and thus many of the government's troops quickly switched sides and defected to the rebels.

The turmoil first began in the towns of Abu Al-Khaseeb and Az Zubayr, south of Basra, at the end of February. On March 1, 1991, one day after the Gulf War ceasefire, a T-72 tank gunner, returning home after Iraq's defeat in Kuwait, fired a shell into a gigantic portrait of Saddam Hussein hanging over Basra's main square and onlooking soldiers applauded. The revolt in Basra was led at first by Muhammad Ibrahim Wali, an army officer who gathered a force of military vehicles to attack the government buildings and prisons in the city; he was backed by a majority of the population. The uprising in Basra was entirely spontaneous and disorganised. The news of this event and Bush's radio broadcasts encouraged the Iraqi people to revolt against the regime in the other towns and cities. In Najaf, a demonstration near the city's great Imam Ali Shrine became a gun battle between army deserters and Saddam's security forces. The rebels seized the shrine as Ba'ath Party officials fled the city or were killed; prisoners were freed from jails. The uprising spread within days to all of the largest Shia cities in southern Iraq: Amarah, Diwaniya, Hilla, Karbala, Kut, Nasiriyah and Samawah. Smaller cities were swept up in the revolution as well.

Many exiled Iraqi dissidents, including thousands of Iran-based Badr Brigades militants of SCIRI, crossed the borders and joined the rebellion. SCIRI concentrated their efforts on the Shia holy cities of Najaf and Karbala, alienating many people who did not subscribe to their Shia Islamist agenda and pro-Iranian slogans, for which SCIRI was later criticized by the Dawa Party. Ranks of the rebels throughout the region included mutinous Sunni members of the military, leftists such as Iraqi Communist Party (ICP) factions, anti-Saddam Arab nationalists, and even disaffected Ba'athists. Disastrously for them, all the diverse revolutionary groups, militias, and parties were united only in their desire for regime change as they had no common political or military program, no integrated leadership, and there was very little coordination between them.

=== Northern uprisings ===
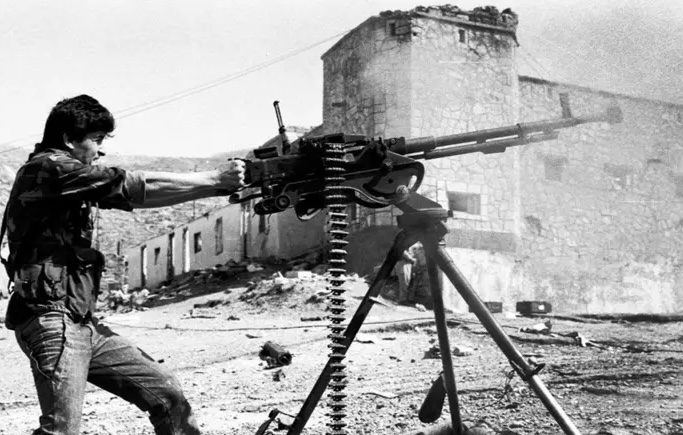
A Kurdish fighter firing the DShK during the uprising

Another wave of insurgency broke out shortly afterwards in the Kurdish populated northern Iraq. Unlike the spontaneous rebellion in the South, the uprising in the North was organized by two rival Kurdish party-based militias: primarily the Patriotic Union of Kurdistan (PUK) and to a lesser extent the Kurdistan Democratic Party (KDP). Additionally, the Assyrian Democratic Movement (ADM) served as the principal Assyrian opposition group, although the group was more active in the 1980s. The ADM reported that the government displaced thousands of Assyrians in Kirkuk, as there were around 30,000 in the city prior to 1991. In the north, the defection of the government-recruited Kurdish home guard militias, known as jash, gave a considerable force to the rebellion.

The rebellion in the north (Iraqi Kurdistan) erupted on March 5 in the town of Rania. Within 10 days, the Kurdish nationalist (Peshmerga), Islamist (Islamic Movement of Kurdistan), and communist (from the ICP and the Communist Party of Kurdistan; the Kurdistan Workers' Party was also active to some extent) rebels, joined by tens of thousands of defecting militiamen and army deserters (reportedly, there were more than 50,000 of them throughout the region), took control of every city in the north except Kirkuk (which eventually fell to them on March 20) and Mosul. Entire units surrendered without much or any resistance, including the whole 24th Division which did not fire a single bullet. In Sulaymaniyah, the rebels besieged and captured the regional headquarters of the dreaded Directorate of General Security secret police (years later, the building, known as Amna Suraka or "Red Security" in Kurdish, became a museum to the crimes of Saddam's regime). In a bloody revenge, they killed several hundred of captured Ba'athist officials and security officers without a trial; reportedly, over 900 security officers were killed at Sulaymaniyah. They also captured enormous quantities of government documents related to the notorious Al-Anfal Campaign in which the government forces had systematically killed tens of thousands of Iraqi Kurds and members of other ethnic minorities three years earlier in 1988; 14 tons of these documents were obtained by Human Rights Watch.

Unlike in the south, the Kurdish rebellion was preceded by demonstrations with clear political slogans: democracy for Iraq and autonomy for Kurdistan. After Mosul was taken, Jalal Talabani proposed to march on the capital Baghdad.

=== Loyalist offensive ===
On March 7, in an effort to quiet the uprisings, Saddam Hussein offered the Shia and Kurd leaders shares in the central government in exchange for loyalty, but the opposing groups rejected the proposal. At the height of the revolution, the government lost effective control over 14 of Iraq's 18 provinces. However, the people of Baghdad remained largely passive, as the Dawa Party, the Communist Party, and the pro-Syrian Ba'ath splinter party had all failed to build underground structures in the capital. There was only limited unrest in the Shia-populated vast slum of Saddam City while the rest of Baghdad remained calm.

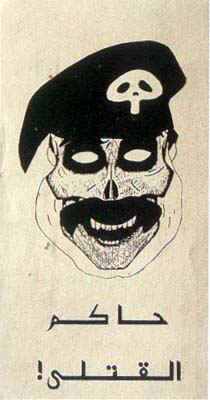
U.S. Gulf War leaflet depicting Saddam Hussein as death

Soon, regime loyalists regrouped and went on an offensive to reclaim the cities. They were helped by the fact that about half the tanks of the elite and politically reliable Republican Guard managed to escape from the Saddam-proclaimed "mother of all battles" in Kuwait and that the Guard headquarters units also survived the war. In addition, the Gulf War ceasefire agreement of March 3 prohibited the Iraqi military's use of fixed-wing aircraft over the country, but allowed them to fly helicopters because most bridges had been destroyed. This was because General Norman Schwarzkopf accepted the request of an Iraqi general to fly helicopters, including armed gunships, to transport government officials because of destroyed transport infrastructure, acting without Pentagon or White House instructions; almost immediately, the Iraqis began using the helicopters as gunships to put down the uprisings. The outgunned rebels had few heavy weapons and few surface-to-air missiles, which made them almost defenseless against helicopter gunships and indiscriminate artillery barrages when the Ba'athists responded to the uprisings with crushing force. According to Human Rights Watch, "in their attempts to retake cities, and after consolidating control, loyalist forces killed thousands of anyone who opposes them whether a rebel or a civilian by firing indiscriminately into the opposing areas; executing them on the streets, in homes and in hospitals; rounding up suspects, especially young men, during house-to-house searches, and arresting them with or without charge or shooting them en masse; and using helicopters to attack those who try to flee the cities."

There were several reports of chemical warfare attacks, including of a nerve agent being used during the assault on Basra. Following an investigation, the United Nations (UN) found that there was no evidence that Iraq used chemical weapons to repress the uprisings, but did not rule out the possibility that Iraq could have used phosgene gas which would not have been detectable after the attack. According to the U.S. government's Iraq Survey Group, Iraqi military did in fact use the nerve agent sarin, as well as non-lethal CS gas, on a massive scale when "dozens" of improvised helicopter bombing sorties were flown against rebels in Karbala and the surrounding areas in March 1991; evidence of apparent mustard gas attacks has also been reported in the areas of Najaf and Karbala by the U.S. forces that have been stationed there at the time.

In the south, Saddam's forces quelled all but a scattering of the resistance by the end of March. On March 29, SCIRI leader Abdul Aziz al-Hakim conceded that Shia rebels withdrew from the cities and that fighting was limited to rural areas. The Kurdish uprising in the north of the country collapsed even more quickly than it began. After ousting the Peshmerga from Kirkuk on March 29, the government tanks rolled into Dahuk and Irbil on March 30, Zakho on April 1, and Sulaymaniyah, the last important town held by the rebels, on April 3. The advance of government forces was halted at Kore, a narrow valley near the ruins of Qaladiza, where a successful defense was held by the Kurds led by Massoud Barzani.

In a 1999 letter, Hoshyar Zebari, head of International Relations of the Kurdish Democratic Party, stated that the "KDP as a major Kurdish political party had led and participated in the Kudish spring uprisings of 1991 in Iraqi Kurdistan. The uprising caused the collapse of Iraqi government military, security and administrative structure in the region... When the Iraqi troops counter-attacked and regained control of Kirkut and other major cities there were rumors of Mujahedin units assisting iraqi troops... However... these rumors happen to be untrue... The KDP can confirm that the Mujahedin were not involved in suppressing the Kurdish people neither during the uprising nor its aftermath." Sources also say the Mujahedin supported the Kurdish rebellion in Iran.

On April 5, the government announced "the complete crushing of acts of sedition, sabotage and rioting in all towns of Iraq." On that same day, the United Nations Security Council approved Resolution 688 condemning the Iraqi government's oppression of the Kurds and requiring Iraq to respect the human rights of its citizens.

== Casualties ==
The death toll was high throughout the country. The rebels killed many Ba'athist officials and officers. In response, thousands of unarmed civilians were killed by indiscriminate fire from loyalist tanks, artillery and helicopters, and many historical and religious structures in the south were deliberately targeted under orders from Saddam Hussein. Saddam's security forces entered the cities, often using women and children as human shields, where they detained and summarily executed or "disappeared" thousands of people at random in a policy of collective responsibility. Many suspects were tortured, raped, or burned alive.

Many of the people killed were buried in mass graves. Mass burial sites containing thousands of bodies have been uncovered since the fall of Saddam Hussein in April 2003. Of the 200 mass graves the Iraqi Human Rights Ministry had registered between 2003 and 2006, the majority were in the South, including one believed to hold as many as 10,000 victims. In 1991, over 200,000 Shia Arabs and 100,000 Marsh Arabs had died in southern Iraq due to the war. Furthermore, over 100,000 Assyrians had fled Iraq.

== Aftermath ==
=== Refugee crisis ===
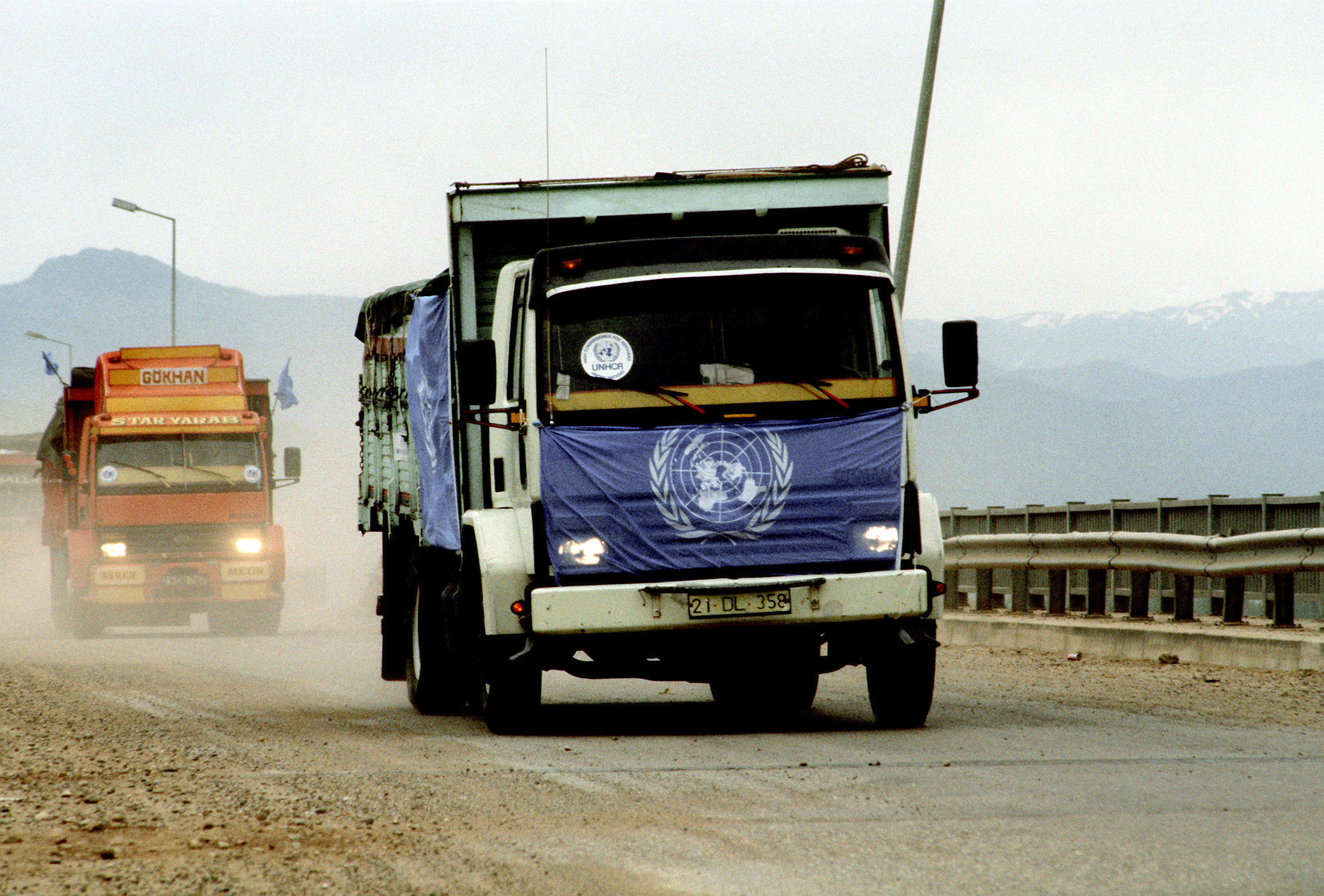
UNHCR trucks with aid supplies for Kurdish refugees, 29 April 1991

In March and early April, nearly two million Iraqis, 1.5 million of them Kurds, escaped from strife-torn cities to the mountains along the northern borders, into the southern marshes, and to Turkey and Iran. By April 6, the United Nations High Commissioner for Refugees (UNCHR) estimated that about 750,000 Iraqi Kurds had fled to Iran and 280,000 to Turkey, with 300,000 more gathered at the Turkish border. The approach towards the refugee immigration was met with a different approach by Iran and Turkey. Iran had opened its borders to the refugees, while Turkey first closed its borders and only opened its borders following international pressure and assurances of financial help to cope with the refugees. Iran also received much less international help to cope with the crisis than Turkey, mainly due to their strained relations with the USA. According to accounts from international relief organizations cited by Nader Entassar, Turkey received more than seven times the amount of help per refugee, as Iran received. Their exodus was sudden and chaotic with thousands of desperate refugees fleeing on foot, on donkeys, or crammed onto open-backed trucks and tractors. Many were gunned down by Republican Guard helicopters, which deliberately strafed columns of fleeing civilians in a number of incidents in both the north and south. Numerous refugees were also killed or maimed by stepping on land mines planted by Iraqi troops near the eastern border during the war with Iran. According to the U.S. Department of State and international relief organizations, between 500 and 1,000 Kurds died each day along Iraq's Turkish border. According to some reports, up to hundreds of refugees died each day along the way to Iran as well.

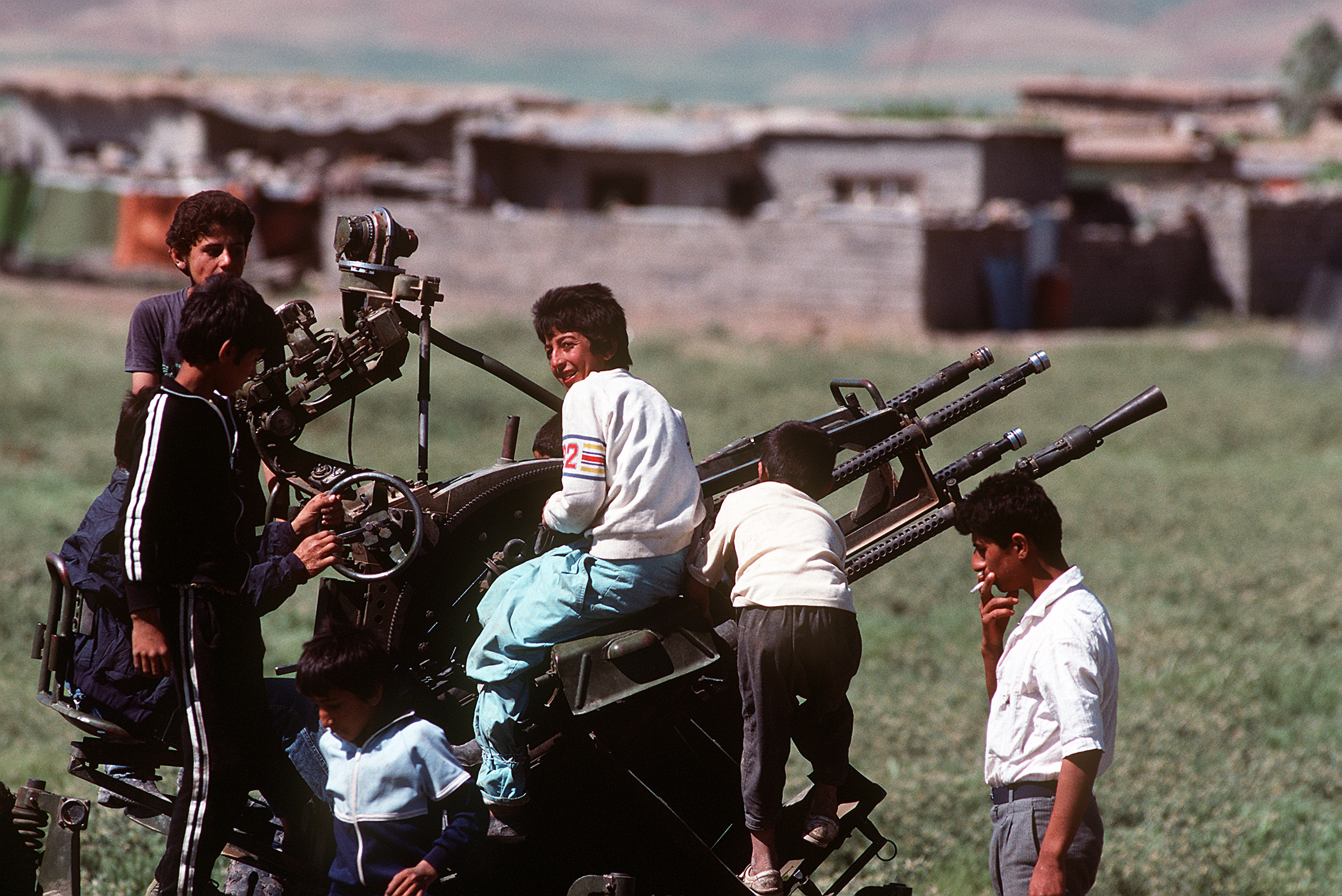
Kurdish children in a refugee camp built during the U.S. and coalition Operation Provide Comfort play on a ZPU gun which was abandoned by Iraqi forces during Operation Desert Storm, 1 May 1991

Beginning in March 1991, the U.S. and some of the Gulf War allies barred Saddam's forces from conducting jet aircraft attacks by establishing the no-fly zone over northern Iraq and provided humanitarian assistance to the Kurds. On April 17, U.S. forces began to take control of areas more than 60 miles into Iraq to build camps for Kurdish refugees; the last American soldiers left northern Iraq on July 15. In the Yeşilova incident in April, British and Turkish forces confronted each other over the treatment of Kurdish refugees in Turkey. Many Shia refugees fled to Syria, where thousands of them settled in the town of Sayyidah Zaynab.

=== Resistance and reprisals in the south ===
In southeastern Iraq, thousands of civilians, army deserters, and rebels began seeking precarious shelter in remote areas of the Hawizeh Marshes straddling the Iranian border. After the uprising, the Marsh Arabs were singled out for mass reprisals, accompanied by ecologically catastrophic drainage of the Iraqi marshlands and the large-scale and systematic forcible transfer of the local population. The Marsh Arab resistance was led by the Hezbollah Movement in Iraq (completely unrelated to the Hezbollah of Lebanon), which after 2003 became the Marsh Arabs' main political party. On July 10, 1991, the United Nations announced plans to open a humanitarian center at Lake Hammar to care for those hiding out in the southern marshlands, but Iraqi forces did not allow UN relief workers into the marshlands or the people out. A large-scale government offensive attack against the refugees estimated 10,000 fighters and 200,000 displaced persons hiding in the marshes began in March–April 1992, using fixed-wing aircraft; a U.S. Department of State report claimed that Iraq dumped toxic chemicals in the waters in an effort to drive out the opposition. In July 1992, the government began trying to drain the marshlands and ordered the residents of settlements to evacuate, after which the army burned down their homes there to prevent them from returning. A curfew was also enforced throughout the south, and government forces began arresting and moving large numbers of Iraqis into detention camps in the central part of the country.

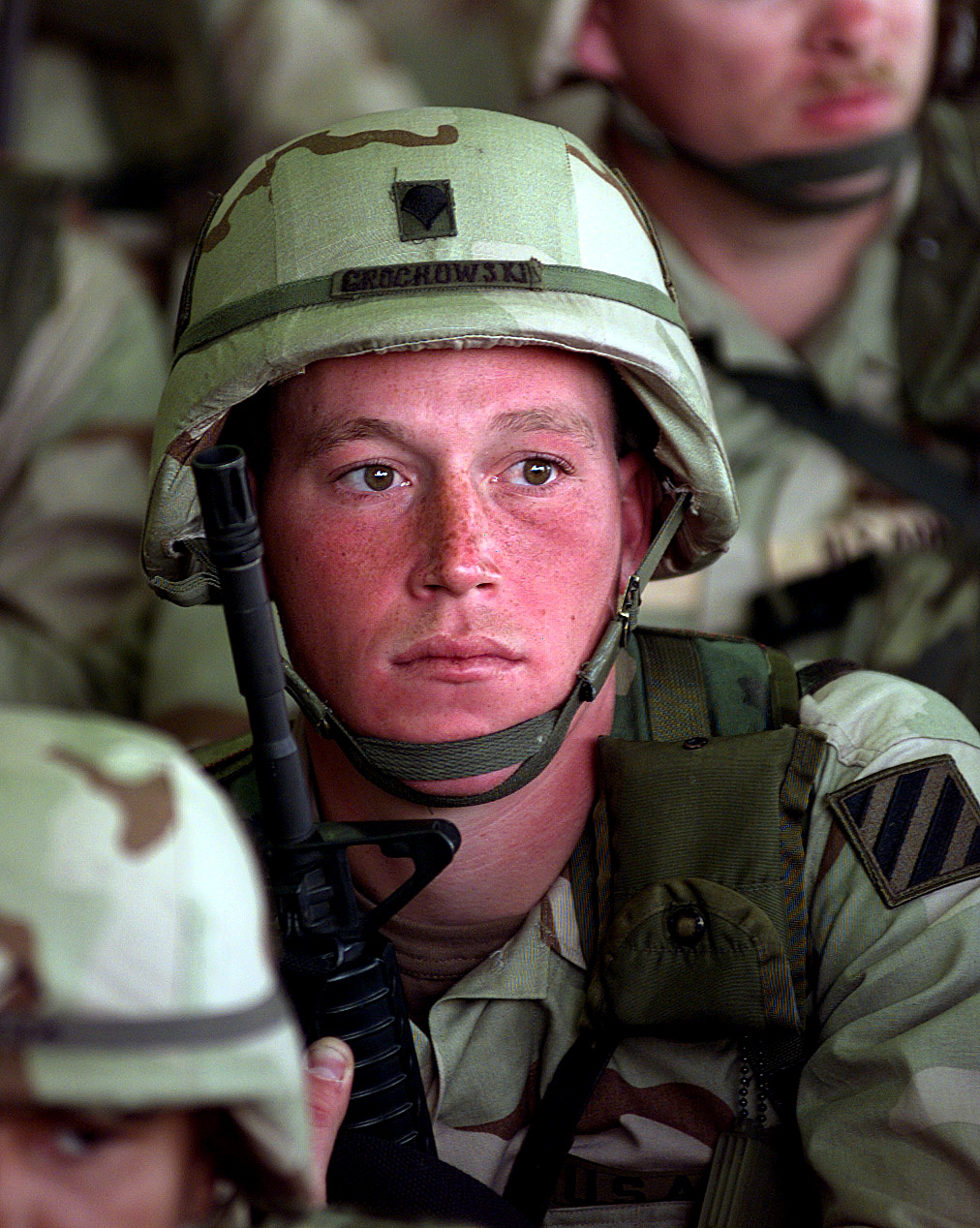
U.S. 3rd Infantry soldiers wait to be deployed in support of Operation Southern Watch, the U.S. and coalition enforcement of the no-fly zone over southern Iraq

At a special meeting of the UN Security Council on August 11, 1992, Britain, France, and the United States accused Iraq of conducting a "systematic military campaign" against the marshlands, warning that Baghdad could face possible consequences. On August 22, 1992, President Bush announced that the U.S. and its allies had established a second no-fly zone for any Iraqi aircraft south of the 32nd parallel to protect dissidents from attacks by the government, as sanctioned by UN Security Council Resolution 688.

In March 1993, a UN investigation reported hundreds of executions of Iraqis from the marshes in the preceding months, asserting that the Iraqi army's behavior in the south is the most "worrying development [in Iraq] in the past year" and added that following the formation of the no-fly zone, the army switched to long-range artillery attacks, followed by ground assaults resulting in "heavy casualties" and widespread destruction of property, along with allegations of mass executions. In November 1993, Iran reported that as a result of the drainage of the marshlands, marsh Iraqis could no longer fish or grow rice and that over 60,000 had fled to Iran since 1991; Iranian officials appealed to the world to send aid to help the refugees. That same month, the UN reported that 40% of the marshlands in the south were drained, while unconfirmed reports surfaced that the Iraqi army had used poisonous gas against villages near the border of Iran. In December 1993, the U.S. Department of State accused Iraq of "indiscriminate military operations in the south, which include the burning of villages and forced relocation of non-combatants." On February 23, 1994, Iraq diverted waters from the Tigris river to areas south and east of the main marshlands, resulting in floods of up to 10 feet of water, in order to render the farmlands there useless and drive the rebels who have been hiding there to flee back to the marshes which were being drained of water. In March 1994, a team of British scientists estimated that 57% of the marshlands have been drained and that in 10 to 20 years the entire wetland ecosystem in southern Iraq would disappear. In April 1994, the U.S. officials said Iraq was continuing a military campaign in Iraq's remote marshes.

Iraq saw further unrest in its Shia dominated provinces in early 1999 following the killing of Grand Ayatollah Mohammad Mohammad Sadeq al-Sadr by the government. Like the 1991 uprisings, the 1999 uprising was violently suppressed.

=== Kurdish sovereign enclave ===
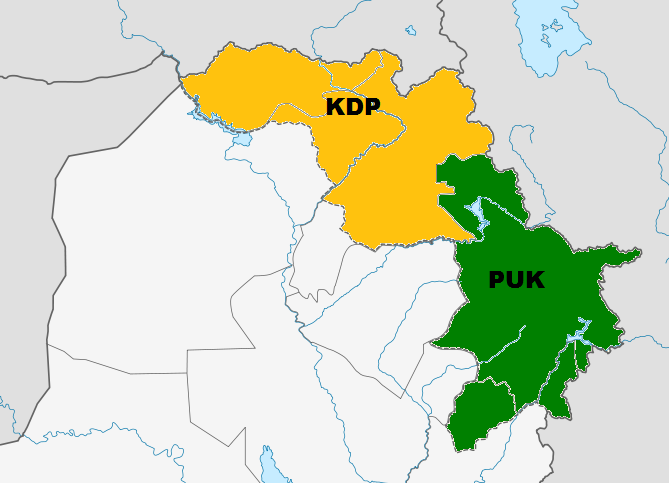
Area controlled by Kurds after the Iraqi Kurdish Civil War (area controlled after October 1991 is a combination of both KDP and PUK areas, controlled by Kurdish Peshmerga rebel forces

In the north, fighting continued until October when an agreement was made for Iraqi withdrawal from parts of Iraq's Kurdish-inhabited region. This led to the establishment of the Kurdistan Regional Government and creation of a Kurdish Autonomous Republic in three provinces of northern Iraq. Tens of thousands of Iraqi soldiers dug-in along the front, backed by tanks and heavy artillery, while the Iraqi government established a blockade of food, fuel, and other goods to the area. The U.S. Air Force continued to enforce a no-fly zone over northern Iraq since March 1991, to defend Kurds fleeing their homes in northern Iraq, the U.S. military also built and maintained several refugee camps in 1991.

This general stalemate was broken during the 1994–1997 Iraqi Kurdish Civil War, when due to the PUK alliance with Iran, the KDP called in Iraqi support and Saddam sent his military into Kurdistan, capturing Erbil and Sulaymaniyah. Iraqi government forces retreated after the U.S. intervened by launching missile strikes on southern Iraq in 1996. On January 1, 1997, the U.S. and its allies launched Operation Northern Watch to continue enforcing the no-fly zone in the north the day after Operation Provide Comfort was over.

=== Post–2003 trials ===
The trial of 15 former aides to Saddam Hussein, including Ali Hassan al-Majid (also known as "Chemical Ali"), over their alleged role in the murder of 60,000 to 100,000 people during the 1991 suppression took place in Baghdad in 2007 and 2008. According to the prosecutor, "the acts committed against the Iraqi people in 1991 by the security forces and by the defendants were one of the ugliest crimes ever committed against humanity in modern history." Al-Majid was already sentenced to death in June 2007 for genocide regarding his role in the 1988 Operation Anfal when he was also convicted for his role in the events of 1991 and given another death sentence; he was executed in 2010. The issue was also given much attention during the trial of Saddam Hussein.

== U.S. non-intervention controversy ==
Prompted by foreign policy "realists" in his administration—such as Colin Powell, Brent Scowcroft and Richard Haass—Mr. Bush allowed Saddam to fly military aircraft to put down the uprising. While thousands of U.S. troops were still on Iraqi soil and in some cases were close enough to watch, the tyrant unleashed the power of modern weaponry against men, women and children.

— Ahmed Chalabi in 2011

Many Iraqi and American critics accused President George H. W. Bush and his administration of encouraging and abandoning the rebellion after halting Coalition forces at Iraq's southern border with Kuwait at the end of the Gulf War. In 1996, Colin Powell, Chairman of the Joint Chiefs of Staff, admitted in his book My American Journey that, while Bush's rhetoric "may have given encouragement to the rebels", "our practical intention was to leave Baghdad enough power to survive as a threat to Iran that remained bitterly hostile toward the United States." Coalition Commander Norman Schwarzkopf Jr. has expressed regret for negotiating a ceasefire agreement that allowed Iraq to keep using helicopters, but also suggested a move to support the uprisings would have empowered Iran. Bush's national security adviser, Brent Scowcroft, told ABC's Peter Jennings "I frankly wished [the uprisings] hadn't happened ... we certainly would have preferred a coup." In 2006, Najmaldin Karim, president of the Washington Kurdish Institute, called it a "betrayal of Iraq", blaming the policy of "a dangerous illusion of stability in the Middle East, a 'stability' bought with the blood of Middle Easterners and that produced such horrors as the massive 1991 bloodletting of Iraqis who sought to overthrow Saddam Hussein."

Soon after the uprisings began, fears of a disintegrating Iraq led the Bush administration to distance itself from the rebels. American military officials downplayed the significance of the revolts and spelled out a policy of non-intervention in Iraq's internal affairs. U.S. Secretary of Defense Dick Cheney stated as the uprisings began: "I'm not sure whose side you'd want to be on." On March 5, Rear Admiral John Michael McConnell, Director of Intelligence for the Joint Chiefs of Staff, acknowledged "chaotic and spontaneous" uprisings were under way in 13 cities of Iraq, but stated the Pentagon's view that Saddam would prevail because of the rebels' "lack of organization and leadership." On the same day, Cheney said "it would be very difficult for us to hold the coalition together for any particular course of action dealing with internal Iraqi politics, and I don't think, at this point, our writ extends to trying to move inside Iraq." The U.S. Department of State spokesman Richard Boucher said on March 6, "We don't think that outside powers should be interfering in the internal affairs of Iraq." On April 2, in a carefully crafted statement, U.S. State Department spokeswoman Margaret Tutwiler said: "We never, ever, stated as either a military or a political goal of the coalition or the international community the removal of Saddam Hussein." Other reasons given for not providing assistance to the uprising included fear of the "Lebanonization of Iraq," Iranian-backed Shias assuming power, and reluctance to recommit U.S. soldiers into fighting. President George H. W. Bush himself insisted three days later, just as the Iraqi loyalist forces were putting down the last resistance in the cities:

I made clear from the very beginning that it was not an objective of the coalition or the United States to overthrow Saddam Hussein. So I don't think the Shiites in the south, those who are unhappy with Saddam in Baghdad, or the Kurds in the north ever felt that the United States would come to their assistance to overthrow this man...I have not misled anybody about the intentions of the United States of America, or has any other coalition partner, all of whom to my knowledge agree with me in this position.

A US-led coalition established a safe haven in northern Iraq in 1991 to encourage Kurdish refugees to return from Turkey. The Bush administration also sternly warned Iraqi authorities on March 7 against the use of chemical weapons during the unrest, but equivocated use of helicopter gunships by the government. U.S. Major General Martin Brandtner, deputy director of operations for the Joint Chiefs of Staff, added that "there is no move on the [part of] U.S. forces... to let any weapons slip through [to the rebels], or to play any role whatsoever in fomenting or assisting any side." Consequently, U.S. troops that were deployed in southern Iraq defended arsenals or blew up them altogether to prevent the rebels from arming themselves, blocked the rebels from advancing onto Baghdad and even actively disarmed some rebel forces; according to Middle East expert William B. Quandt, U.S. forces also "let one Iraqi division go through [their] lines to get to Basra because the United States did not want the regime to collapse." In addition to destroying captured munitions, the Bush administration transferred some to the Mujahideen in Afghanistan, and even returned some to the Iraqis; at the same time, the Bush administration accused Iran of sending arms to the rebels.

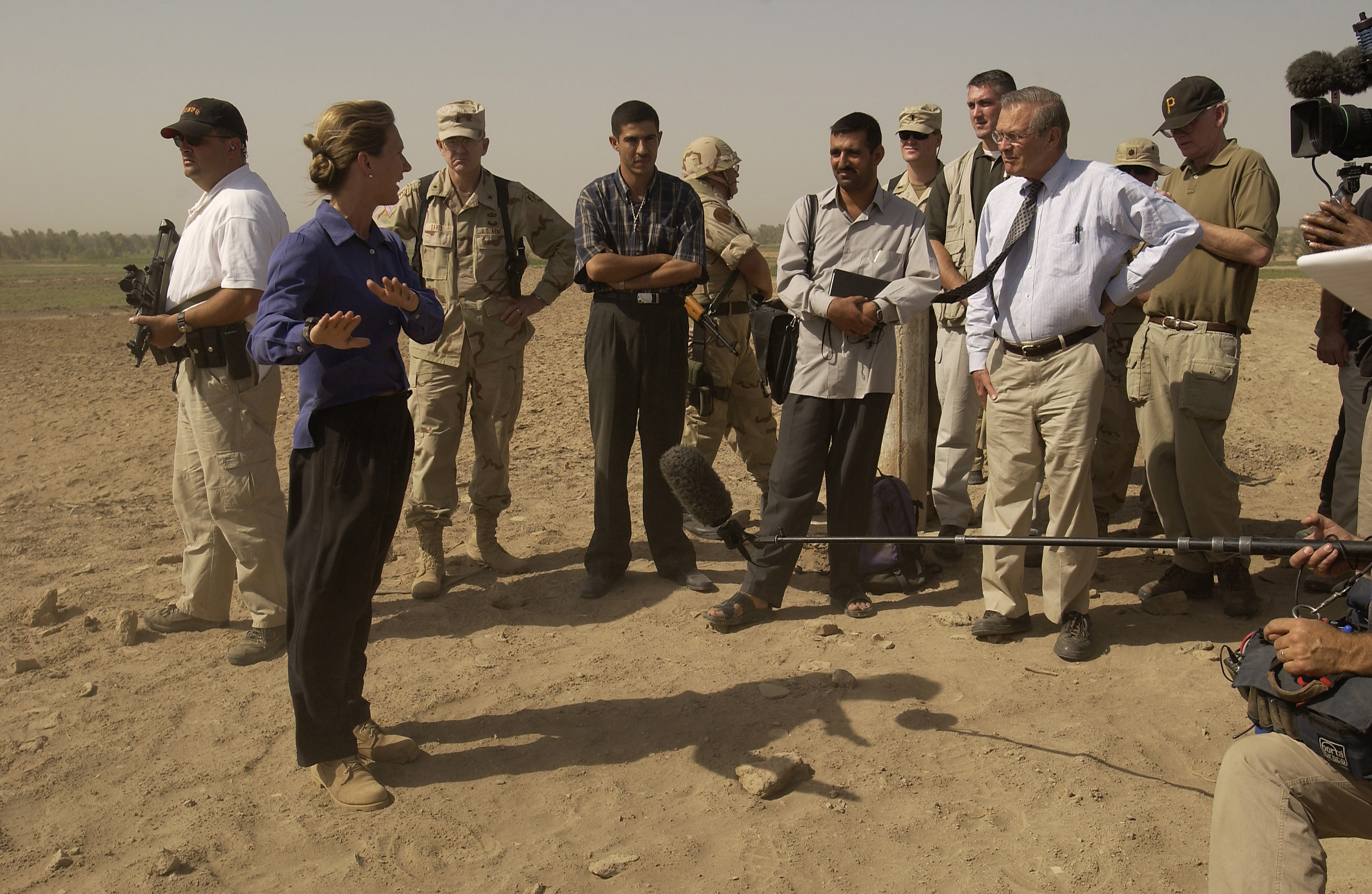
Coalition Provisional Authority Human Rights Officer Sandra Hodgkinson briefs U.S. Secretary of Defense Donald Rumsfeld on the Al-Mahawil mass grave site in 2003

The U.S. abandonment of the 1991 revolution was cited by many analysts as an explanation for the fact that the skeptical Iraqi Shia population did not welcome the U.S.-led coalition forces during the 2003 invasion of Iraq the way some officials of George W. Bush administration had predicted before the war began, remaining reluctant to rise up against Saddam until Baghdad fell. In 2011, the U.S. ambassador to Iraq, James F. Jeffrey, officially apologized to Iraqi politicians and southern tribal leaders for the U.S. inaction in 1991. Adel Abdul Mahdi, a top Iraqi Shia political leader, commented: "At the least, from what we are facing now, this would have been a much better solution than the solution of 2003. The role of Iraq's people would have been fundamental, not like in 2003." A spokesman for a top Shia religious leader, Ayatollah Basheer Hussain Najafi, stated that "the apology of the U.S. has come too late, and does not change what happened. The apology is not going to bring back to the widows their husbands, and bereaved mothers their sons and brothers that they lost in the massacre that followed the uprising."

== In film ==
Films that have used the southern rebellions as their subject include the 1999 film Three Kings by David O. Russell, the 2008 film Dawn of the World by Abbas Fahdel, as well as the 1993 Frontline documentary Saddam's Killing Fields by Michael Wood.

== See also ==
- 1935–36 Iraqi Shia revolts
- 1977 Shia uprising in Iraq
- 1999 Shia uprising in Iraq
- Kurdish Rebellion of 1983
- Iraqi Partisan movement, 1979–88
- First Iraqi–Kurdish War
- Second Iraqi–Kurdish War
- Human rights in Saddam Hussein's Iraq
- Arab Spring
- Libyan Civil War
- Syrian Civil War
- List of modern conflicts in the Middle East
- Kurdish Mujahideen
