= 1979–1980 Shia uprising in Iraq =

Political rebellion in Iraq

First Sadr Uprisng
Date	1979–1980
Location	Iraq
Result	Rebellion suppressed: Muhammad Baqir al-Sadr and Amina Haydar al-Sadr executed.

Belligerents
Ba'athist Iraq	Shi'ite rebels

Commanders and leaders
Saddam Hussein	Muhammad Baqir al-Sadr (executed) Amina al-Sadr (executed)

The 1979–1980 Shia uprising in Iraq, also known as the First Sadr Uprising, took place as a follow up to the Iranian Revolution (1978–1979) in neighbouring Iran, as the Shia Iraqi clerics vowed to overthrow Ba'athist Iraq, dominated by (secular) Sunni Muslims—specifically the Saddam Hussein family. Saddam and his deputies believed that the riots had been inspired by the Iranian Revolution and instigated by Iran's government. The riots erupted in May 1979 and escalated in June—leading to thousands being tortured and killed in Najaf. The uprising subsided with the April 1980 arrest of the leader of Shia Iraqis, Muhammad Baqir al-Sadr and his subsequent execution.

== History ==
Al-Sadr's works attracted the ire of the Baath Party leading to repeated imprisonment where he was often tortured. Despite this, he continued his work after being released. When the Baathists arrested Ayatollah Al-Sadr in 1977, his sister Amina Sadr bint al-Huda made a speech in the Imam Ali mosque in Najaf inviting the people to demonstrate. Many demonstrations were held, forcing the Baathists to release Al-Sadr who was placed under house arrest.

In 1979–1980, anti-Ba'ath riots arose in the Iraq's Shia areas by groups, who were working toward an Islamic revolution in their country. Saddam and his deputies believed that the riots had been inspired by the Iranian Revolution and instigated by Iran's government. In the aftermath of Iran’s revolution, Iraq’s Shiite community called on Mohammad Baqir al-Sadr to be their “Iraqi Ayatollah Khomeini”, leading a revolt against the Ba'ath regime. Community leaders, tribal heads, and hundreds of ordinary members of the public paid their allegiance to al-Sadr. Protests then erupted in Baghdad and the predominantly Shiite provinces of the south in May 1979. For nine days, protests against the regime unfolded, but were suppressed by the regime. The cleric’s imprisonment led to another wave of protests in June after a seminal, powerful appeal from al-Sadr’s sister, Bint al-Huda. Further clashes unfolded between the security forces and protestors. Najaf was put under siege and thousands were tortured and executed.

Muhammad Baqir al-Sadr was finally arrested on 5 April 1980 with his sister, Sayedah Bint al-Huda. They had formed a powerful militant movement in opposition to Saddam Hussein's regime.

On 9 April 1980, Al-Sadr and his sister were killed after being severely tortured by their Baathist captors. Signs of torture could be seen on the bodies. The Baathists raped Bint Houda in front of her brother. An iron nail was hammered into Al-Sadr's head and he was then set on fire in Najaf. It has been reported that Saddam himself killed them. The Baathists delivered the bodies of Baqir Al-Sadr and Bintul Huda to their cousin Sayyid Muhammad al-Sadr. They were buried in the Wadi-us-Salaam graveyard in the holy city of Najaf the same night. His execution raised no criticism from Western countries because Al-Sadr had openly supported Ayatollah Khomeini in Iran.

== Aftermath ==
The 1999 Shia uprising in Iraq (or Second Sadr Uprising) took place in Iraq in early 1999 following the killing of Mohammad Mohammad Sadeq al-Sadr by the then Ba'athist government of Iraq. The protests and ensuing violence were strongest in the heavily Shia neighborhoods of Baghdad, as well as southern majority Shiite cities such as Karbala, Nasiriyah, Kufa, Najaf, and Basra.

== See also ==
- 1977 Shia protests in Iraq
- The Five Martyrs
