= Battle of Saddam City =

Part of the Iraqi uprisings following the Gulf War

Coordinates: 33.3333°N 44.4333°E

- Part of the 1991 uprisings in Iraq
Date	March 1991
Location	Saddam City, Baghdad, Ba'athist Iraq
Result	Iraqi government victory

Belligerents
Ba'athist Iraq	Shi'a rebels: SCIRI & Badr; Islamic Dawa Party; Iraqi Army deserters

Commanders and leaders
(Iraq) Qusay Hussein	Unknown

Units involved
Republican Guard	Unknown

Strength
7,000 soldiers	Unknown
- Location within Iraq

The Battle of Saddam City occurred in March 1991 as part of the wider anti-Saddam uprisings across Iraq, although the uprising in the Saddam City district of Baghdad was far more limited in scale than the kind of uprisings seen in southern Iraq. In response to the unrest in Saddam City, Saddam Hussein's son Qusay Hussein led a siege of the district, with dissent being repressed. Baghdad as a whole remained quiet, with the capital serving not as a center for the uprisings, but as a staging post for the government counter-offensive.

== The Saddam City unrest ==
Whilst the uprisings saw the Iraqi Government lose control over 14 of Iraq's 18 provinces in March 1991, Baghdad remained largely passive. This was in part due to the fact that the Dawa Party, the Communist Party, and the pro-Syrian Ba'ath splinter party had all failed to build underground structures in the capital. Instead, the unrest within Baghdad was limited to the vast suburban Shia-populated slum of Saddam City, which by 1991 had a population of 1 million, and which was a stronghold of Shiite cleric Mohammad Sadeq al-Sadr.

Baghdad also saw more limited unrest due to the fact that strict government control over the media and communication prevented the full scale of the Iraqi defeat in the Gulf War from being apparent to the residents of Baghdad, who, unlike the residents of southern Iraq, had not witnessed the Iraqi defeat unravel on their doorstep. Whilst many parts of the country also saw some degree of a power vacuum, the Iraqi government maintained a large security presence within Baghdad.

In response to the uprising Qusay Hussein led a government siege of the district. Some 7,000 troops were transferred to Baghdad on 4 March in order to augment the city's defenses, and the Iraqi Government would declare a state of emergency in Baghdad on 21 March.

== Aftermath ==
Following the uprising, Saddam stationed an elite Special Republican Guard battalion (the 10th Battalion) at the al-Rashid barracks near Saddam City. The battalion was charged with sealing off and indiscriminately bombarding the district in the case of future revolts, in a manner similar to the Republican Guard actions in Najaf and Karbala.
