= 1977 Shia uprising in Iraq =

Acts of civil disorder

Date	February 4-9 1977
Location	Najaf & Karbala, Iraq
Result	Uprisings failed

Belligerents
Ba'athist Iraq	Iraqi rebels

Commanders and leaders
(Ba'athist Iraq) Ahmed Hassan al-Bakr	No centralised leadership

The 1977 Shia protests in Iraq, or the Safar uprising, were a series of demonstrations and riots against the Iraqi government in Karbala and Najaf Governorates, the demonstrations started on 4 February 1977 and finished on 9 February in the same year. Demonstrators had taken to the streets to demonstrate against the Iraqi government because they had blocked Arbaʽeen Pilgrimage. The Iraqi security forces killed and arrested many protesters and presented them to trial in a revolution court, the revolution court declared execution for eight demonstrators and life imprisonment for 16 demonstrators.

== Background ==
On 17 July 1968 the Ba'athism took power in Iraq, Ba'athism is an Arab nationalist and Arab socialist ideology that promotes the development and creation of a unified Arab state. In 1977, Ba'athism attempted to ban an annual pilgrimage to Karbala as well as attempted to ban religious processions. This move sparked protests, with the pilgrimage transforming into the 1977 Safar uprising in holy Shia cities.

== Timeline ==
- 4 February: In Najaf city, many protesters went out in the street and were blocked from going to Karbala for Arbaʽeen Pilgrimagee. The protesters stayed in Khan Al-Musala (Al-Rube) for the night
- 5 February: The protesters arrived Al-Haydreyah (Khan Al-Nus), a small town located north of Najaf. The protesters stayed there that night
- 6 February: In Al-Haydreyah town, one protester was killed. His name was Muhammed Al-Mayali. He was killed after violent clashes between protesters and Iraqi security forces. The protesters set many police offices on fire along the road between Najaf and Karbala. The protesters arrived to Khan Khan al-Rubu' (Khan al-Nukhaylah) and remained there in the night.
- (7 ,8 and 9) February: The Iraqi government sent the Republican Guard forces and some Iraqi army units to Karbala and Najaf to end the demonstrations and riots. They were successful in stopping the protests in Karbala and Najaf governorates

== The names of the executed demonstrators through revolution court ==
1. Jassim Sadiq Al-Irawani
2. Youssef Sattar Al-Asadi
3. Muhammed Said Al-Balagy
4. Najeh Muhammed Karim
5. Sahib Rahim Abu Kalal
6. Abbas Hadi Ajenah
7. Kamil Naji Malo
8. Gazi Judi Khuwayr

== See also ==
- The Five Martyrs
- 1979–1980 Shia uprising in Iraq
