= Khan al-Rubu' =

- خان الربع (Arabic)
- Khan al-Nukhaylah
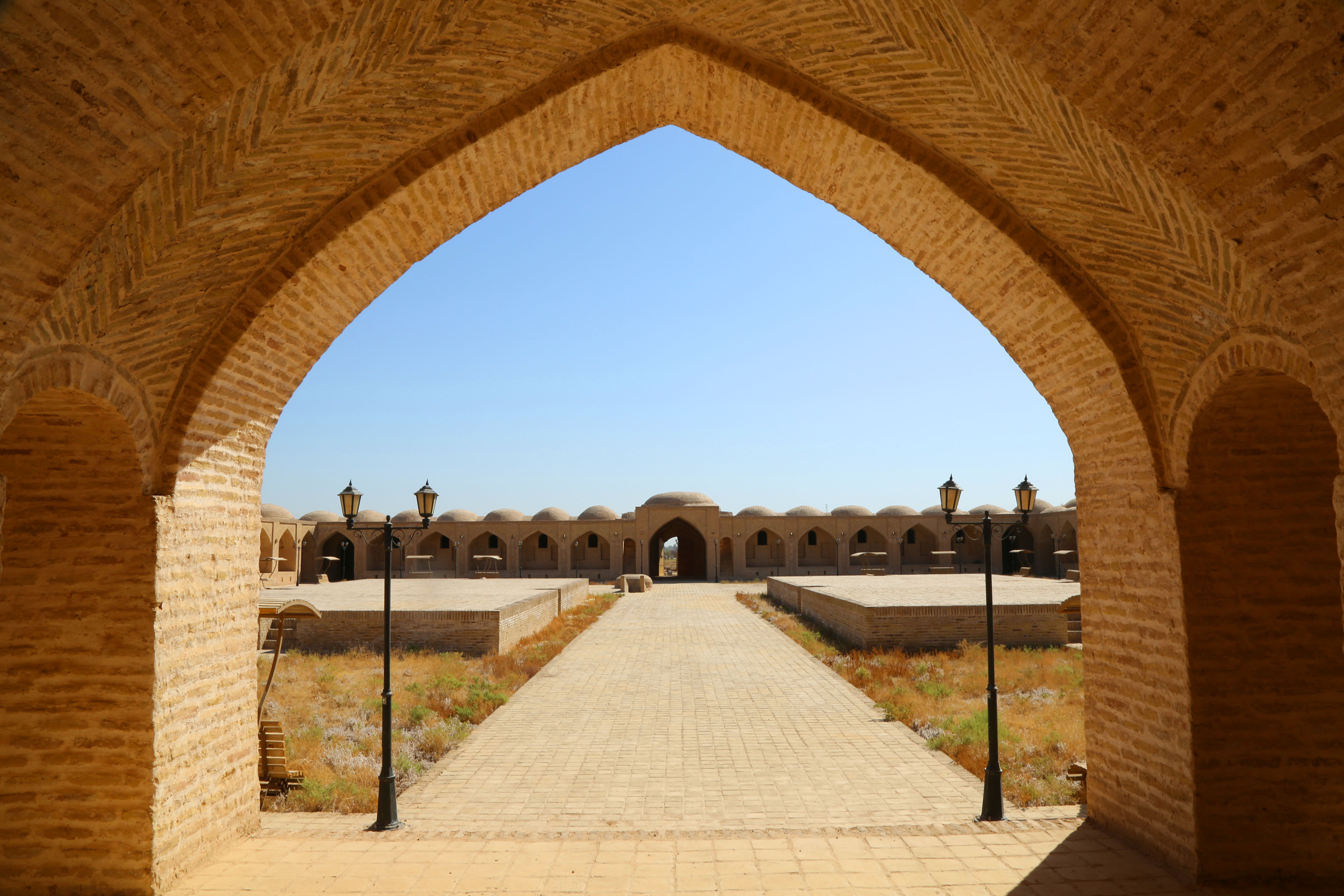
- Khan al-Rubu courtyard
- Interactive map of Khan al-Rubu'
- 32.4735°N 44.1591°E
- Type: Khan (Caravanserai)
- Location: Karbala, Iraq
- Nearest city: Karbala

History
- Built: Ottoman era
- Original use: Resting place for caravans

Site notes
- Current use: Cultural site (hosts Khan al-Rubu' cultural festival)
- Website: المخيم الحسيني مشهد على الخلود وشاهد على التغيير

Khan al-Rubu’ (Arabic: خان الربع) also known as Khan al-Nukhaylah (Arabic: خان النخيلة), is a historical khan in Iraq located near the city of Karbala. It is around 16 km away from the Karbala city center, and situated at the road bound to the city of Najaf. The khan dates back to the Ottoman era, and it was used as a resting place for caravans traveling between the two cities.

In February 2017, the Khan al-Rubu’ cultural festival was inaugurated which lasts for two years.
