= Nader Entessar =

Iranian political scientist

Nader Entessar (Persian: نادر انتصار)
- Born: 1948 (age 77–78)
- Education: Saint Louis University (MA/Ph.D.,); University of California, Los Angeles
- Scientific career
- Fields: International relations, Middle East studies
- Workplaces: University of South Alabama

Nader Entessar (born 1948) is an Iranian political scientist, Professor and Chair of the Department of Political Science and Criminal Justice, University of South Alabama. He achieved a bachelor's degree from the University of California, Los Angeles, and a master's degree and Ph.D. from the Saint Louis University. He is known for his research on Middle East politics.

== Books ==
- Kurdish Politics in the Middle East
- Kurdish Ethnonationalism, 1992
- Iran Nuclear Negotiations: Accord and Détente since the Geneva Agreement of 2013
- Trump and Iran: From Containment to Confrontation,
- Iran Nuclear Accord and the Remaking of the Middle East
