= 1999 Shia uprising in Iraq =

Revolt In Iraq

- Part of Prelude to the Iraq war
Date	18 February – April 1999
Location	Iraq
Result	Iraqi government victory

Belligerents
(Iraq) Government; Iraqi Armed Forces; Republican Guard; Fedayeen Saddam; Ba'ath Party	Rebels: SCIRI / Badr; Dawa

Commanders and leaders
(Iraq) Saddam Hussein (Iraq) Ali Hassan al-Majid (Iraq) Taha Yassin Ramadan (Iraq) Izzat Ibrahim al-Douri (Iraq) Tariq Aziz (Iraq) Qusay Hussein	Mohammed al-Sadr X Mohammad Baqir al-Hakim; Abdul Aziz al-Hakim; Hadi al-Amiri

Casualties and losses
210-410 killed	Dozens dead, wounded and arrested
- 200+ dead

The 1999 Shia uprising in Iraq (Arabic: انتفاضة العراق 1999, romanized: intifāḍa al-ʿIrāq 1999) or Second Sadr Uprising (انتفاضة الصدر intifāḍa ṣadara) was a short period of unrest in Iraq in early 1999 following the killing of Muhammad al-Sadr allegedly by the then Ba'athist–led government of Iraq. The protests and ensuing violence were strongest in the heavily Shia neighborhoods of Baghdad, as well as southern majority Shiite cities such as Karbala, Nasiriyah, Kufa, Najaf, and Basra.

== Background ==
Epicenters of the uprising

As his power grew, al-Sadr became more and more involved in politics following the Gulf War and throughout the 1990s he openly defied Saddam. He organized the poor Shi'ites of Sadr City, yet another nickname for the Shi'ite neighbourhood in Baghdad, against Saddam and the Baath Party. Sadr gained the support of Shi'ites by reaching out to tribal villages and offering services to them that they would otherwise not have been afforded by Hussein's regime. Saddam began to crack down on the Shi'ite leadership in the late 1990s in an attempt to regain control of Iraq.

Sometime before his death, al-Sadr was informed of Saddam's limited patience with him. In defiance, al-Sadr wore his death shroud to his final Friday sermon to show that Shi'ites would not be intimidated by Saddam's oppression and that Sadr would preach the truth even if it meant his own death. He was later killed leaving the mosque in the Iraqi city of Najaf along with two of his sons as they drove through the town. Their car was ambushed by men, and both his sons were killed by gunfire while he was severely injured. He died an hour later in the hospital. Iraqi Shias, as well as most international observers, suspected the Iraqi Baathist government of being involved in, if not directly responsible, for their murders. The Iraqi government denied involvement in the killing, and quickly tried and executed three alleged killers, although one of the suspects had apparently been in prison at the time of the attack on al-Sadr.

== Uprising ==
=== February ===
==== Saddam City 18–21 ====
Following the killing of al-Sadr the Iraqi government withheld news of al-Sadr's death for 24 hours as it tried to pressure the family to not hold witnessed a period of unrest and protests. The Iraqi government in this period also executed al-Sadr's deputy, and confiscated his writings and videos of his sermons. Unaware of al-Sadr's death, Shiite worshipers arrived at the Rassoul mosque in Saddam City to pray for al-Sadr's recovery. Iraqi soldiers then arrived and ordered the worshipers to leave. The soldiers later opened fire when the worshipers refused to leave, and instead began chanting anti-Saddam slogans and throwing stones, leaving some 80 dead. Following this news spread throughout Saddam City that al-Sadr had been murdered, resulting in mass anti-government demonstrations.

The Iraqi government then sealed off Saddam City and deployed the Republican Guard to put down the growing demonstrations. After 24 hours the demonstrations had been largely suppressed, leaving between 27 and 100 dead. Iraqi security forces proceeded to arrest representatives of al-Sadr in Baghdad and throughout the south.

==== Unrest spreads 20–21 ====
Officials of the Shiite opposition group, the Islamic Supreme Council of Iraq, began accusing the Iraqi government of responsibility for the death of al-Sadr on 20 February, which they saw as part of a government effort to destroy all Shiite opposition groups.

Although the protests in Saddam City had been put down, new protests began to flare across Shiite majority Southern Iraq, with 20 protesters being killed by security forces on the 21, with another 250 arrested across Iraq. Iraqi forces also shelled Nasiriyah after local protesters attacked a government building. Iraqi security forces also opened fire on demonstrators at a Shiite shrine 20 miles from Nasiriyah, killing at least 5, including two 14-year-olds.

=== March ===
==== Early March ====
On 3 March Ammar al-Hakim, the leader of SCIRI, announced that it had attacked several government buildings in Karbala as part of the revenge operations for the killing of al-Sadr.

The ninth and tenth of March saw further clashes between Iraqi security forces and fighters from SCIRI in two southern Iraqi provinces, with SCIRI reporting that over 100 people had been killed in the clashes and 8 government tanks destroyed.

==== Basra, March 17–18 ====
Some of the worst violence of the uprising took place on the evening of 17 March in Basra, when large armed groups of members of the Shiite opposition attacked several police stations and offices of the Iraqi Ba'ath party. Contemporary press reports indicated that the clashes between protesters and security forces were in some cases particularly heavy, involving both armoured units and artillery. The opposition groups were even able to seize and occupy several of the police stations and Ba'ath party offices, which they held until the morning of 18 March, at which point they withdrew. Eyewitnesses talking to Human Rights Watch claimed that in some Basra neighbourhoods the firefight continued for more than an hour, whilst in others gunfire was heard throughout the night. The violence resulted in the deaths of several members of the Fedayeen Saddam, the Ba'ath party, and other security services. In total around 100 were estimated to have died in the Basra clashes. Several witnesses told Human Rights Watch that protesters had attacked and killed at least 40 Ba'ath party members.

=== April ===
In possibly some of the last violence of the uprising, there were several clashes between Iraqi security forces and members of the Iraqi opposition across southern Iraq on 24 April.

== Aftermath ==
Following the stifled uprising the Iraqi government organised a strict crackdown against potential opponents. The Iraqi government never acknowledged the scale and extent of the uprising and barely reported any news about it.

In a rare acknowledgement of domestic unrest, the Iraqi government admitted on 15 May 1999 that there had been anti-government disturbances in Basra in mid March. The Iraqi government however denied reports of widespread killing, and blamed the unrest on Iranian infiltrators.

=== Prosecution ===
Following the 2003 Invasion of Iraq and the toppling of the Ba'athist government the suppression of the events of 1999 were investigated by the Supreme Iraqi Criminal Tribunal. The ensuing trials had 14 defendants, and ultimately saw Ali Hassan al-Majid, then Director of the Iraqi Intelligence Service, along with former senior Ba'athist officials Aziz Saleh Hassan al-Noman and Mahmood Faizi Mohammed al-Haza sentenced to death. Seven others received prison sentences ranging from six years to life imprisonment for their criminal roles during the uprising.

== See also ==
- 1977 Shia protests in Iraq
