= Ba'athist Iraq =

Iraqi state from 1968 to 2003

Iraqi Republic (1968–1992) الجمهورية العراقية al-Jumhūriyyah al-‘Irāqiyyah Republic of Iraq (1992–2003) جمهورية العراق Jumhūriyyat al-ʽIrāq
- 1968–2003
- Top: Flag (1968–1991); Bottom: Flag (1991–2003) Top: Emblem (1968–1991); Bottom: Emblem (1991–2003)
- Motto: (1968–1991) وحدة، حرية، اشتراكية; Waḥda, Ḥurriyya, Ishtirākiyya "Unity, Freedom, Socialism" (1991–2003) الله أكبر; Allāhu akbar "God is the Greatest"
- Anthem: (1968–1981) والله زمان يا سلاحي; Walla Zaman Ya Selahy "It has been a long time, oh my weapon!" (1981–2003) أرض الفراتين; Arḍu 'l-Furātayn "Land of the Two Rivers"
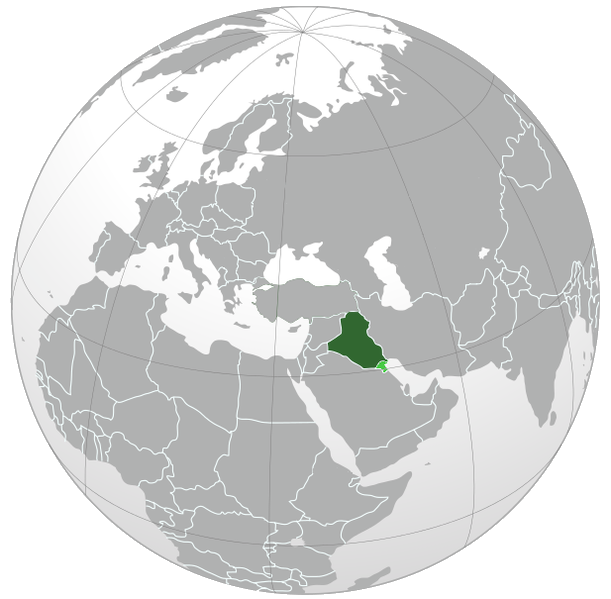
- Location of Ba'athist Iraq Kuwait, occupied and annexed by Iraq between 1990 and 1991
- Capital and largest city: Baghdad
- Official languages: Arabic
- Demonym: Iraqi
- Government: Unitary one-party presidential republic under a totalitarian dictatorship
- President
  - 1968–1979: Ahmed Hassan al-Bakr (first)
  - 1979–2003: Saddam Hussein (last)
- Prime Minister
  - 1968 (first): Abd ar-Razzaq an-Naif
  - 1994–2003 (last): Saddam Hussein
- Legislature: Revolutionary Command Council
- History
  - 17 July Revolution: 17 July 1968
  - Ba'ath Party Purge: 22 July 1979
  - Iran–Iraq War: Sep 1980 – Aug 1988
  - Gulf War: Aug 1990 – Feb 1991
  - 2003 invasion of Iraq: 20 March – 1 May 2003
  - Fall of Baghdad: 3–9 April 2003

Area
- 2002: 438,317 km^{2} (169,235 sq mi)

Population
  - 2002: 24,931,921 (41st)
  - Density: 57/sq mi (22.0/km^{2}) (87th)
- GDP (nominal): 2002 estimate
  - Total: ▼$18.970 billion (74th)
  - Per capita: ▼$761 (141st)
- HDI (2002): 0.603 medium (114th)
- Currency: Iraqi dinar (د.ع) (IQD)
- Time zone: UTC+3 (AST)
- Calling code: +964
- ISO 3166 code: IQ
- Internet TLD: .iq
Preceded by
1968: First Iraqi Republic
1990: Republic of Kuwait
1991: Saudi Arabian–Iraqi neutral zone
Succeeded by
1991: State of Kuwait
2003: Coalition Provisional Authority
- Today part of: Iraq; Kuwait

Ba'athist Iraq, retroactively known as the Second Iraqi Republic; and officially the Iraqi Republic (1968–1992) and later the Republic of Iraq (1992–2003), was the Iraqi state between 1968 and 2003 under the one-party rule of the Iraqi regional branch of the Arab Socialist Ba'ath Party. The regime emerged as a result of the 17 July Revolution which brought the Ba'athists to power, and lasted until the U.S.-led invasion of Iraq in 2003.

The Ba'ath Party, led by Ahmed Hassan al-Bakr, came to power in Iraq through the bloodless 17 July 1968 Revolution, which overthrew president Abdul Rahman Arif and prime minister Tahir Yahya. By the mid-1970s, Saddam Hussein became the country's de facto leader, despite al-Bakr's de jure presidency. Saddam's new policies boosted the Iraqi economy, improved living standards, and elevated Iraq's standing within the Arab world. However, several internal factors were imminently threatening Iraq's stability; the Sunni-dominated Ba'athist government faced Shia religious separatism and Kurdish ethnic separatism. The Second Iraqi–Kurdish War was of great concern to the government as Kurdish rebels received extensive support from Iran, Israel, and the United States. Following the 1974–1975 Shatt al-Arab clashes, Saddam met with Iranian monarch Mohammad Reza Pahlavi and signed the 1975 Algiers Agreement, ceding territory to Iran in exchange for an end to Kurdish support. With the Kurdish rebellion subsequently disadvantaged, the Iraqi military reasserted the federal government's control over Iraqi Kurdistan.

In 1979, Saddam succeeded the ailing al-Bakr as president and publicly purged the Ba'ath Party of his opponents. Alarmed by Iranian attempts to export the revolution in Iraq, Saddam adopted an aggressive stance against Iran and its new theocratic leader, Ruhollah Khomeini, after his rejections of Iraqi goodwill offers. In September 1980, Iraq invaded Iran, triggering the eight-year-long Iran–Iraq War that ended in a stalemate in 1988. The conflict left Iraq economically devastated and dependent on foreign loans. Kuwait, which had loaned money to Iraq, demanded repayment and increased oil production, lowering international oil prices and worsening the Iraqi economy, while pressuring the Iraqi leadership to repay the loans. In 1989, Iraq accused Kuwait of stealing Iraqi petroleum, and failed negotiations resulted in the Iraqi invasion of Kuwait in August 1990, triggering the Gulf War. Iraq occupied Kuwait until February 1991, when a 42-country UNSC military coalition expelled Iraqi forces from Kuwait. Subsequent international sanctions cut Iraq off from all global markets and crippled the Iraqi economy throughout the 1990s, though it began recovering by the early 2000s as sanctions enforcement waned. The sanctions were widely criticized for its negative impact on quality of life in Iraq, prompting the establishment of the Oil-for-Food Programme.

Following the September 11 attacks, the United States' Bush administration began building a case for invading Iraq and overthrowing Saddam's regime, falsely claiming that Iraq possessed weapons of mass destruction and had links with al-Qaeda. On 20 March 2003, Iraq was invaded by a U.S.-led coalition, which overthrew Saddam and captured much of Iraq by May. In December 2003, American troops captured Saddam and turned him over to Iraq's new Shia-led government. From 2005 to 2006, Saddam was put on trial for crimes against humanity concerning the 1982 Dujail massacre, in which the Iraqi government killed Shi'ite rebels. After sentencing Saddam to death, the Iraqi Special Tribunal executed him for crimes against humanity on 30 December 2006. The period of Saddam's rule has been described as Iraq's longest period of internal stability since independence in 1932 but his rule has also been criticized for its extensive repression, particularly towards the Kurdish population.

== History ==
=== 1968 coup ===
In contrast to previous coups d'état in Iraq's history, the 1968 coup, referred to as the 17 July Revolution, was, according to Con Coughlin, "a relatively civil affair". The coup started in the early hours of 17 July, when a number of military units and civilian Ba'athists seized several key government and military buildings; these included the Ministry of Defence, the electricity station, radio stations, all the city's bridges and "a number of military bases". All telephone lines were cut at 03:00, by which time several tanks had been commanded to halt in front of the Presidential Palace. Abdul Rahman Arif, the then-President of Iraq, first knew of the coup when jubilant members of the Republican Guard started shooting into the air in "a premature triumph". Ahmed Hassan al-Bakr, the leader of the operation, told Arif about his situation through military communication hardware at the base of operations. Arif asked for more time, during which he contacted other military units to seek support. As he soon found out, the odds were against him, and he surrendered. Arif telephoned al-Bakr and told him that he was willing to resign; to show his gratitude, al-Bakr guaranteed his safety. al-Bakr's deputies, Hardan al-Tikriti and Salah Omar al-Ali, were ordered to give Arif this message in person. Arif and his wife and son were quickly sent on the first available flight to London. Later that morning, a Ba'athist broadcast announced that a new government had been established. The coup was carried out with such ease that there were no deaths.

The coup succeeded because of contributions made by the military; the Arab Socialist Ba'ath Party was not strong enough to take power by itself. The Ba'ath Party managed to make a deal with Abd ar-Razzaq an-Naif, the deputy head of military intelligence, and Ibrahim Daud, the head of the Republican Guard. Both Naif and Daud knew that the long-term survival of Arif's and Tahir Yahya's government looked bleak, but also knew that the Ba'athists needed them if the coup was to be successful. For his participation in the coup, Naif demanded to be given the post of Prime Minister after the coup as a reward, and a symbol for his strength. Daud was also "rewarded" with a post; he became head of Ministery of Defence. However, not everything was going according to Naif's and Daud's plan; al-Bakr had told the Ba'ath leadership in a secret meeting that the two would be liquidated either "during, or after, the revolution".

al-Bakr, as the leader of the coup's military operation, retained his position as Regional Secretary of the Ba'ath Party, and was elected to the posts of Chairman of the Revolutionary Command Council, President and Prime Minister. In the immediate aftermath of the coup, a power struggle developed between al-Bakr and Naif. In all practicality, Naif should have had the upper hand; he was a respected officer and was supported by the common soldiers. al-Bakr, however, proved to be more cunning, persuasive and organised than Naif, Daud and their supporters. One of al-Bakr's first decisions in office was to appoint over 100 new officers to the Republican Guard. Saddam Hussein worked, in the meantime, to establish the party's security and intelligence organisation to combat its enemies. On 29 July, Daud left for a tour to Jordan to inspect the Iraqi troops located there following the Six-Day War with Israel. The following day, Naif was invited to eat lunch at the Presidential Palace with al-Bakr, during which Saddam burst into the room with three accomplices and threatened Naif with death. Naif responded by crying out; "I have four children". Saddam ordered Naif to leave Iraq immediately if he wanted to live. Naif complied, was exiled to Morocco. An assassination attempt in 1973 was unsuccessful, but he was assassinated in London on the orders of Saddam in 1978. Daud shared a similar fate, and was exiled to Saudi Arabia. The Ba'athists were by no means ensured of victory; if any of Naif's supporters had known of the operation against him, Baghdad could have become the centre, in the words of journalist Con Coughlin, "of an ugly bloodbath".

=== Al-Bakr's rule and Saddam's rise to power (1968–1979) ===
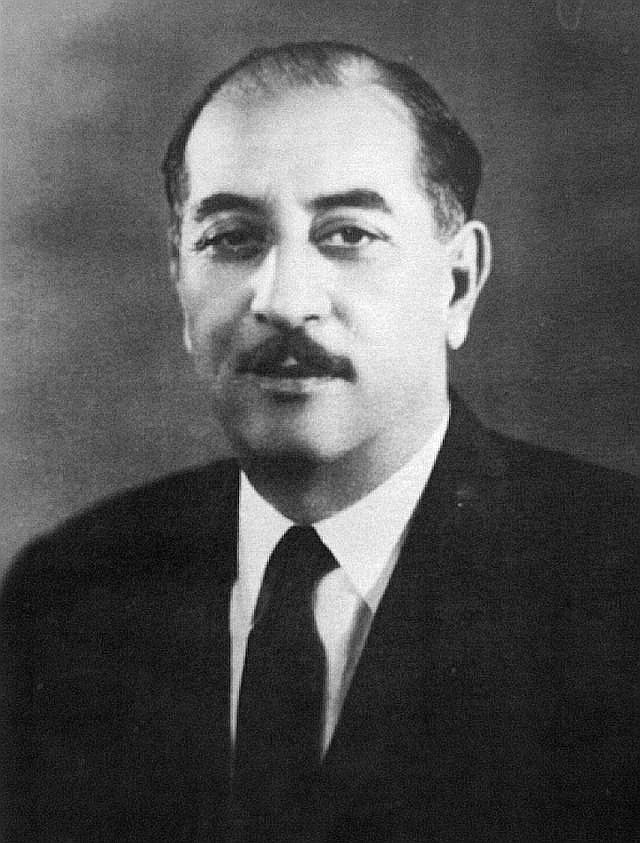
Ahmed Hassan al-Bakr was de jure leader of Iraq from 1968 to 1979.

al-Bakr strengthened his position in the party with the help of Saddam's newly established party security apparatus and the intelligence services. Most of 1968 was used to repress non-Ba'athist thought and groups; for instance, a campaign against Nasserists and communists was initiated under Saddam's command. Several spy plots were created by the government; spies who were "caught" were accused of being a part of a Zionist plot against the state. The Iraqi Communist Party (ICP) was skeptical of the new Ba'athist government, as many of its members remembered the anti-communist campaign launched against them by the Ba'athist government of 1963. After taking power, al-Bakr offered the ICP cabinet positions in the new government; the ICP rejected this offer. al-Bakr responded by initiating a systematic campaign against the ICP and communist sympathisers. However, as historian Charles Tripp notes in A History of Iraq, the campaign started "a curious game" whereby the government alternately persecuted and courted the party until 1972–1973, when the ICP was offered, and accepted, membership in the National Progressive Front (NPF). The reason for this "curious game" was the Ba'ath Party's belief that the ICP was more dangerous than it really was. When Aziz al-Haji broke away from the ICP, established the Iraqi Communist Party (Central Command) and initiated a "popular revolutionary war" against the government, it was duly crushed. By April 1969 the "popular revolutionary" uprising had been crushed, and al-Haji recanted his beliefs publicly. Another reason for this anti-communist policy was that many Ba'ath Party members openly sympathised with communists or other socialist forces. However, at this stage, neither al-Bakr nor Saddam had enough support within the party to initiate a policy unpopular within it; at the Seventh Regional Congress of the Ba'ath Party, both al-Bakr and other leading Ba'athists expressed their support for "radical socialism".

During the 1970s, military officers unsuccessfully attempted to overthrow the Ba'athist regime on at least two occasions. In January 1970, an attempted coup led by two retired officers, Major General Abd al Ghani ar Rawi and Colonel Salih Mahdi as Samarrai, was thwarted as the conspirators entered the Republican Palace. In June 1973, a plot by Nazim Kazzar, a Shia and the director of internal security, to assassinate al Bakr and Saddam Husayn was also thwarted. Both coup attempts were followed by summary trials, executions, and purges of the military.

By the mid-to-late 1970s, Saddam's power within the Ba'ath Party and the government grew; he became de facto leader of the country, although al-Bakr remained as president, Ba'ath Party leader and Revolutionary Command Council chairman. In 1977, following a wave of protests by Shias against the government, al-Bakr relinquished his control over the Ministry of Defence; Adnan Khairallah Tulfah, Saddam's brother-in-law, was appointed defence minister. This appointment underscored the clannish character of the Ba'ath Party and the government. In contrast to Saddam's fortunes, those of al-Bakr's were on the wane. Rumours of al-Bakr's bad health began to circulate in the country. By the end of 1977, al-Bakr had little control over the country through his office as president. The reason Saddam did not become president until 1979 may be explained by Saddam's own insecurity. Before making himself de jure head of state, Saddam initiated an anti-communist campaign; the ICP had no real power, and most of its leading officials had left the country or been imprisoned or executed by the Ba'ath government. The campaign was not centered on the ICP, but also Ba'athists who did not support Saddam. Saddam had initiated a similar campaign in 1978, that time to check where the loyalties of certain left-wingers were: Ba'athism or socialism. Following the campaign, Saddam entered the Arab-world stage for the first time under the banner of Nasserism and Gamal Abdel Nasser by criticising the Camp David Accords between Anwar Sadat of Egypt and the state of Israel.

It was in this situation that Saddam took over the offices of president, Ba'ath Party leader and Revolutionary Command Council chairman. Izzat Ibrahim al-Duri was promoted to the office of vice-chairman (equivalent to the post of vice-president in the West). There were also rumours within the top echelons of power that al-Bakr (with the assistance of Iraqi Ba'athists who opposed Saddam) was planning to designate Hafez al-Assad as his successor. Immediately after Saddam seized power, over 60 members of the Ba'ath Party and the government leadership were charged with fomenting an anti-Iraqi Ba'athist plot in collaboration with al-Assad and the Damascus-based Ba'ath Party.

=== Early years, Iran–Iraq War and aftermath (1979–1990) ===
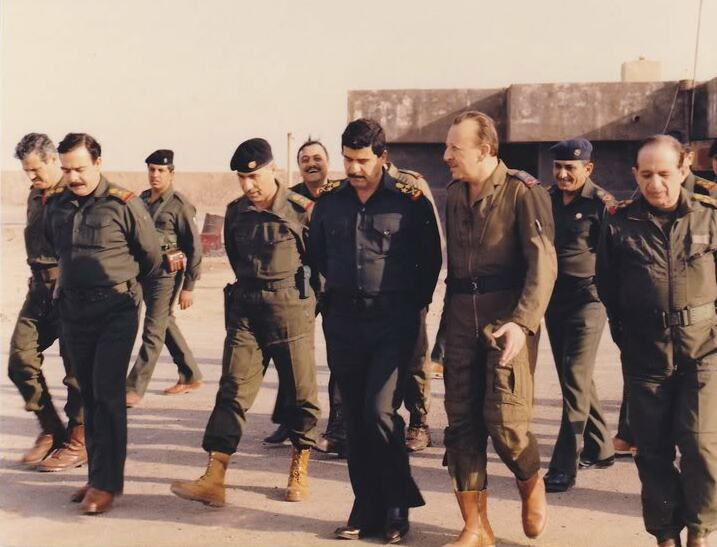
Adnan Khairallah, Iraqi Defense Minister, meeting with Iraqi soldiers during the Iran-Iraq war.

Once he assumed the presidency, a cult of personality was created around Saddam. He was represented as the father of the nation and, by extension, of the Iraqi people. National institutions (such as the National Assembly) were established to strengthen the image of him fostered by the Iraqi propaganda machine. The Ba'ath Party also contributed to the cult of personality; by 1979 it was a nationwide organisation, and became a propaganda center for pro-Saddam literature. The propaganda campaign (at least in the beginning) created a common sense of nationhood for many Iraqis. The Shia protests were not quelled by these propaganda campaigns, and the establishment of an Islamic Republic in Iran after the abdication of Shah Mohammed Reza Pahlavi influenced many Iraqi Shia Islamists to stand up against the Sunni-dominated government. At first relations between Iran and Iraq were fairly good, but ideological differences could not remain concealed forever. The new Iranian leadership was composed of Shia Khomeinists, while the Iraqi Ba'athists were secular Arab nationalists. Iran had become concerned about the Iraqi government's continued repression against the Iraqi Islamist Shias. At the beginning of 1980, several border clashes took place between the two countries. Iraq considered the newly established Iran to be "weak"; the country was in a state of continued civil unrest, and the Iranian leaders had purged thousands of officers and soldiers because of their political views.

It was presumed that the Iran–Iraq War would result in a quick Iraqi victory. Saddam's plan was to strengthen Iraq's position in the Persian Gulf and on the Arab-world stage. A quick victory would restore Iraq's control over all of Shatt al-Arab, an area which Iraq had lost to Iran in 1975. Saddam abrogated the treaty of 1975 in a meeting of the National Assembly on 17 September 1980. This abrogation was followed shortly afterwards by several preemptive strikes on Iran and an invasion of Iran. Saddam believed that the Iranian government would have "to disengage in order to survive". Not only was this view faulty, but it overestimated the strength of the Iraqi military; the Iranian government saw the invasion as a test of the revolution itself and all its achievements. The military plan proved to be elusive; Iraq believed that the Iranian government would quickly disintegrate during the Iraqi invasion, this did not happen. Saddam, "in a rare moment of frankness, [...] admitted as much". While the war was not going as planned, Iraq reasserted its view of the situation, and claimed that winning the war was a matter of "national honour". The majority of the Ba'athist leadership (and Saddam himself) still believed that Iran would collapse under the weight of Iraqi force.

Donald Rumsfeld, as US special envoy to the Middle East, meets Saddam Hussein in December 1983 (video).

In 1982, Iran counter-attacked and was successful in driving the Iraqis back into Iraq. That year alone, an estimated 40,000 Iraqis were taken prisoner. The defeats of 1982 were a blow to Iraq. With the economic situation worsening because of falling oil prices (and the rising military budget), the Iraqi standard of living worsened. The Revolutionary Command Council and the Ba'ath Military Command, Regional Command and National Command met in an extraordinary session in 1982 (with Saddam absent), to discuss the possibility of a ceasefire proposal to the Iranian government. The ceasefire proposal made at the meeting was rejected by the Iranian government. If the proposal had been accepted Saddam would have not have survived politically, since it was supported by all members of the Regional Command, National Command and the Revolutionary Command Council. It was at this time that rumours started circulating that Hussein would step down as president to make way for al-Bakr, the former president. As events proved, this did not happen and al-Bakr died in 1982 under mysterious circumstances. Bloodshed during the conflict nearly led to a mutiny led by Maher Abd al-Rashid, father-in-law of Saddam's second son. Rashid began public criticism, and claimed that loss of life could have been averted if not for Saddam's meddling into military affairs. This confrontation with the military led to the greater independence of military planning from Ba'athist-leadership interference. Shortly afterwards, the Iraqi Air Force once again established air superiority. The turn of events caused the Iraqi government to focus on Iraqi Kurdistan which had revolted. Saddam appointed his cousin Ali Hasan al-Majid as military chief in Kurdistan. al-Majid initiated the al-Anfal campaign; chemical weapons were used against civilians. In April 1988, after a series of Iraqi victories, a ceasefire was agreed between Iraq and Iran; the war is commonly considered status quo ante bellum.

=== Gulf War, the 1990s, and the Iraq War (1990–2003) ===
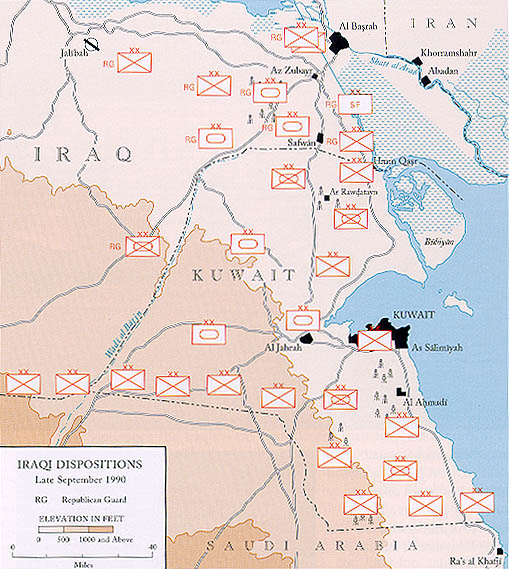
Map of the invasion of Kuwait

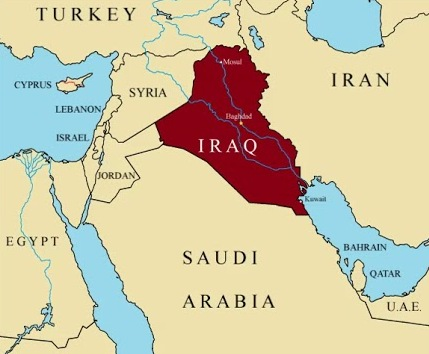
Map of Iraq after the invasion and annexation of Kuwait

In the aftermath of the Iran–Iraq War, Kuwait intentionally increased the country's oil output; this led to an international price decrease in oil. Saddam reacted by threatening to invade Kuwait if it continued to increase its oil output (which Kuwait did nevertheless). Saudi Arabia, frightened by Saddam's military strength, then persuaded Kuwait to lower its oil output. However, when Kuwait lowered its oil output Venezuela increased its output. Saddam then ordered the invasion of Kuwait to solve the country's economic problems, with the professed goal of uniting Iraq; Kuwait was considered by many Iraqis as part of Iraq. On 18 July 1990 Saddam demanded that Kuwait repay Iraq for the oil it had (according to Saddam) stolen, and nullified Iraq's debt to Kuwait. The Kuwaiti leadership failed to respond, and on 2 August 1990 the Iraqi military began the invasion of Kuwait. The invasion led to an international outcry; the United Nations, United States and the United Kingdom condemned the invasion and introduced sanctions against Iraq, and the Soviet Union and several Arab states also condemned the invasion. George H. W. Bush, President of the United States, demanded the immediate withdrawal of Iraqi troops from Kuwait and restoration of the Kuwaiti government; Saddam responded by making Kuwait an Iraqi province. The Gulf War was initiated by a United States-led coalition, which succeeded in winning the war in less than a year.

On the evening of 24 February, several days before the Gulf War ceasefire was signed in Safwan, the Saudi Arabia-based radio station Voice of Free Iraq (funded and operated by the Central Intelligence Agency) broadcast a message to the Iraqis to rise up and overthrow Saddam. The speaker on the radio was Salah Omar al-Ali, a former member of the Ba'ath Party and the ruling Revolutionary Command Council. Al-Ali's message urged the Iraqis to overthrow the "criminal tyrant of Iraq". Al-Ali's radio broadcast encouraged Iraqis to "stage a revolution" and claimed that "[Saddam] will flee the battlefield when he becomes certain that the catastrophe has engulfed every street, every house and every family in Iraq". Believing that the United States was on its side, a nationwide uprising against Saddam's rule began in March 1991 which was repressed by Saddam's loyalist forces. The Coalition successfully established a no-fly zone to halt the advance of Saddam's forces. Instead of occupying Iraqi Kurdistan, the Kurdish Autonomous Republic was established, with thousands of Iraqi troops stationed at the Iraqi-Kurdish border. The suppression of the rebellion led thousands of people to flee their homes, most to Turkey or Iran. On 2 and 3 April 1991 Turkey and Iran, respectively, raised the issue at the UN Security Council. The Security Council adopted Resolution 688, which stated that Iraq had to allow access for international humanitarian organisations and report openly about government repression.

Iraq experienced another period of unrest in early 1999 following the killing of Mohammad Mohammad Sadeq al-Sadr by Iraqi security forces.

In the aftermath of the September 11 attacks, U.S. president George W. Bush included Saddam in his Axis of evil. In 2002 the UN Security Council adopted Resolution 1441, which stated that Iraq had failed to fulfill its obligations demanded by the UN. The United States and the United Kingdom would use Resolution 1441 as a pretext for war. The 2003 US-led invasion of the country forced the Ba'ath Party and Saddam to go underground. The fall of Baghdad resulted in the toppling of his statue at Firdos Square by Iraqi civilians, ending almost 35 years of Ba'athist rule. The Ba'ath Party was banned by the Coalition Provisional Authority following Iraq's invasion on 16 May, as part of the de-Ba'athification policy undertaken to remove Ba'athist influence from Iraqi political society. Saddam was captured later that year, and was executed in 2006.

== Politics ==
=== Political system ===
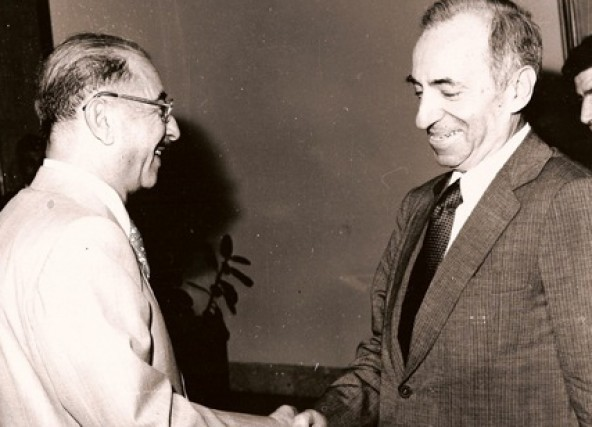
Ahmed Hassan al-Bakr (left), the Regional Secretary of the Iraqi Ba'ath, shaking hands with Michel Aflaq, principal founder of Ba'athist thought, in 1968.

The 1970 Iraqi Constitution stated that Iraq was in a transitional phase of development; in Ba'athist ideology, the transitional stage is the time when the Arab people unite to establish one Arab nation. The end of the transitional era would be marked by a permanent constitution; the 1970 constitution was only temporary. The Ba'ath Party dominated all government institutions, and the top decision-making body in the country was the Revolutionary Command Council (RCC). The RCC was controlled by the Ba'ath Party; RCC members had to be members of the Ba'ath Party's Regional Command. Saddam Hussein, as President of Iraq, was also RCC chairman and General Secretary of the Ba'ath Party's Regional (and National) Command. All decisions within the RCC had to be decided by vote; a proposition could only be enacted if two-thirds of RCC members voted in favour of it. A Council of Ministers, the cabinet, was established on the orders of the RCC to execute RCC orders submitted to it. A National Assembly existed, which was (in theory) democratically elected by the Iraqi people; the problem was that the RCC had the authority to decide how much (or little) power the National Assembly should have.

The constitution of 1970 proclaimed Ba'athist Iraq as "a sovereign people's democratic republic" dedicated to the establishment of a Ba'athist socialist society. Although the state was officially secular, Islam was proclaimed the country's state religion (although freedom of religion was tolerated). Some studies support the claim that Ba'athist Iraq was a totalitarian state; some scholars have refuted the term "totalitarian" and instead defined the regime as authoritarian. Natural resources and the principal means of production were defined as belonging to the Iraqi people. The Iraqi government was responsible for directing and planning the national economy. If the RCC chairman died or was incapacitated, first in the line of succession was the RCC deputy chairman. There were only two RCC deputy chairmen under Ba'athist rule: Saddam (1968–1979) and Izzat Ibrahim ad-Douri (1979–2003).

Iraq was a presidential republic, with power centralised in the national government due to the country's internal unitary structure.

==== Ba'ath Party ====
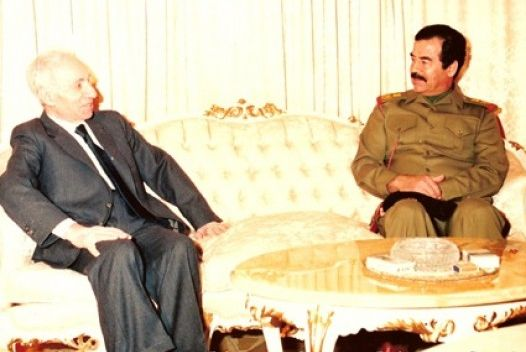
Saddam Hussein (right) talking with Ba'ath party leader Michel Aflaq

National leaders		Regional leaders	
Name	Term	Name	Term
Michel Aflaq	1968–1989	Ahmed Hassan al-Bakr	1966–1979
Saddam Hussein	1992–2003	Saddam Hussein	1979–2003

Iraq, under the rule of the Iraqi-led Arab Socialist Ba'ath Party, was a one-party state. The Regional Command (RC, the leading organ of the Iraqi Regional Branch of the Ba'ath Party) was the party's top decision-making body; Regional Command members were elected for five-year terms at the party's regional congress. The Regional Secretary (commonly referred to as the General Secretary) was the head of the Regional Command, chaired its sessions and was leader of the Ba'ath Party Regional Branch in Iraq. In theory members of the Regional Command were responsible to the party congress, but in practice they controlled the congress, and the leadership often decided results beforehand. The party's National Command was, in theory, the highest decision-making body. It was responsible for coordinating the pan-Arab Ba'ath movement. All National Command members came from their distinct regional (meaning "country" in Ba'athist etymology) branch; for instance, there was always a member who represented the Ba'ath Party's Jordanian Regional Branch. Because of the 1966 Ba'ath Party schism (which split the Ba'ath movement into an Iraqi-led branch and a Syrian-led branch), the National Command never controlled the whole Ba'ath movement; there was a National Command headquartered in Syria, which commanded another Ba'ath movement. Another problem was the fact that the National Commands in Iraq and Syria were under the control of the country's respective regional commands.

===== National Progressive Front =====
The National Progressive Front (NPF) was a popular front led by the Iraqi Ba'ath Party, established on 17 July 1973 (the fifth anniversary of the 17 July Revolution). The NPF charter was signed by Ahmed Hassan al-Bakr (representing the Ba'ath Party) and Aziz Muhammad (First Secretary of the Iraqi Communist Party, or ICP). In Al-Thawrah, a Ba'athist newspaper, the charter was hailed as a success for the revolution. The ICP was the most prominent party to join; however, it left the NPF in March 1979. While officially an independent organisation (and the only non-Ba'athist political forum), the NPF's leadership consisted entirely of Ba'athist members or Ba'athist loyalists. The organisation's purpose was to give the Ba'athist regime a semblance of popular support. Throughout the NPF's existence, Naim Haddad was its general secretary.

=== Opposition ===
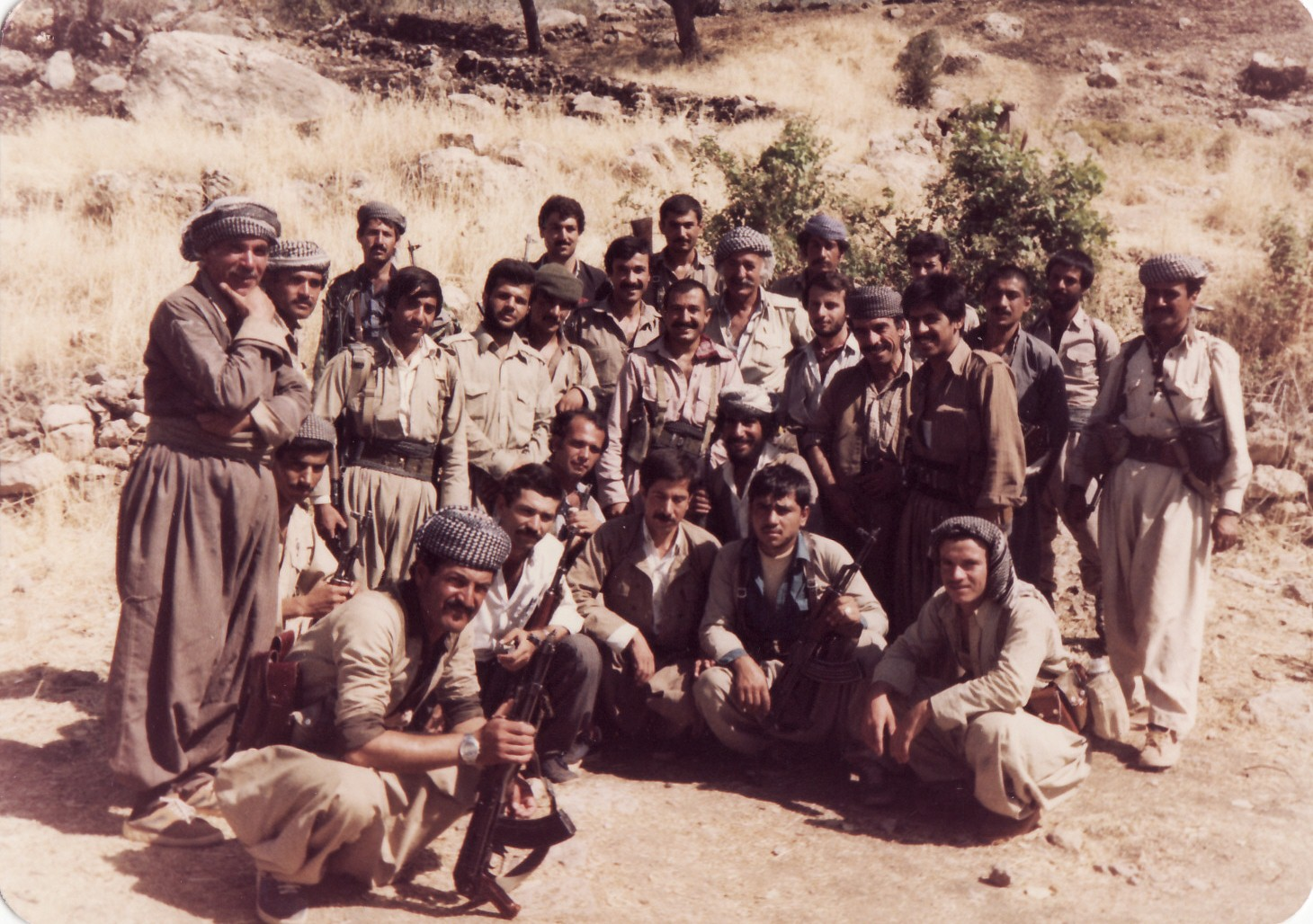
Kurdish peshmerga (opposition forces) in northern Iraq during the Iran–Iraq War.

The Iraqi opposition manifested itself in three forms: guerilla warfare against the regime; acts of sabotage or terrorism; and desertion from the Iraqi Army or the country's paramilitary forces, such as the Popular Army and Fedayeen Saddam. The largest opposition forces were headquartered in Iraqi Kurdistan, represented by the Kurdish Democratic Party (KDP) and the Patriotic Union of Kurdistan. Other organisations who opposed the regime were the Iraqi Communist Party (ICP), the al-Da'wa Party (headquartered in Tehran) and the Umma Party (based in London). One problem with the Iraqi opposition was the lack of alliances between opposition groups (although some alliances did exist – for instance, that between the ICP and the KDP). This alliance led the ICP to move its headquarters to Iraqi Kurdistan, since their activities in other areas of Iraq were routinely repressed. The Ba'athist regime was never able to take full control of the situation in Iraqi Kurdistan, with the exception of an interregnum between the end of the Iran–Iraq War and the 1991 uprising. Another problem was that the Iraqi opposition had frequent problems with internal strife; for instance, the ICP was forced to hold a party congress in 1985 to stabilise the party. A more immediate problem was the strength of Iraq's secret services, renowned in the Arab world as the most efficient.

In contrast to the secular opposition, the religious opposition was better organised and stronger. Several religious opposition groups could appeal to Iraqis, because of the secular nature of the Ba'athist government. During the Iran–Iraq War the government allowed some degree of religious freedom, but only to win support from the populace.

=== State ideology ===
==== Party ideology ====
The Ba'ath Party was based on the ideology of Ba'athism, a Syrian ideology conceived by Zaki al-Arsuzi, Michel Aflaq and Salah al-Din al-Bitar, but evolved into neo-Ba'athism. Clause six of the Ba'ath Party's "Permanent Principles" stated "The Ba'ath is a revolutionary party. It believes that its principal aims in [the process of] realising an Arab national renaissance and of building socialism will not be attained except by revolution and struggle". Revolution was not the key aspect of Ba'ath Party ideology; it was its clear ideological platform. Ba'athism was by nature secular, even if its ideological founders had borrowed elements from Islam. The Ba'ath Party first began to talk openly of Islam during the 1990s. Considering that the term "ba'ath" comes from Islamic scriptures, the Ba'ath Party claimed that all Muslims were Ba'athists even if they were not party members. As with the original Ba'ath Party, the Iraqi-led Ba'ath Party's key slogans were "A single Arab nation with an eternal message" and "Unity, freedom, socialism". The first slogan refers to pan-Arabism and Arab nationalism. Al-Arsuzi believed that unity of the Arab people, and the establishment of an Arab nation, would lead to its becoming as strong as (or stronger than) the Soviet Union and the United States. Liberty, in the Ba'athist sense of the word, does not mean political liberty for the individual. Instead, when Ba'athists use the term "liberty" they refer to national independence from imperialism. Socialism in Ba'athist parlance means Arab socialism. Arab socialism is distinct from the international socialist movement, opposing Marx's rejection of nationalism. According to Aflaq, socialism is a means to modernise the Arab world but not a system (as generally considered in the West) which opposes private property or supports economic equality.

==== Saddamism ====
Saddamism (Saddamiyya) is a political ideology based on the politics related to (and pursued by) Saddam Hussein. It has also been referred to by Iraqi politicians as Saddamist Ba'athism (Al-Ba'athiyya Al-Saddamiyya). It is officially described as a distinct variation of Ba'athism. It espouses Iraqi nationalism and an Iraq-centred Arab world that calls upon Arab countries to adopt Saddamist Iraqi political discourse, and reject "the Nasserite discourse" which it claims collapsed after 1967. It is militarist, viewing political disputes and conflict from a military standpoint as "battles" requiring "fighting", "mobilization", "battlefields", "bastions" and "trenches". Saddamism was officially supported by Saddam Hussein's government and promoted by the Iraqi daily newspaper Babil, which was owned by Saddam's son Uday Hussein.

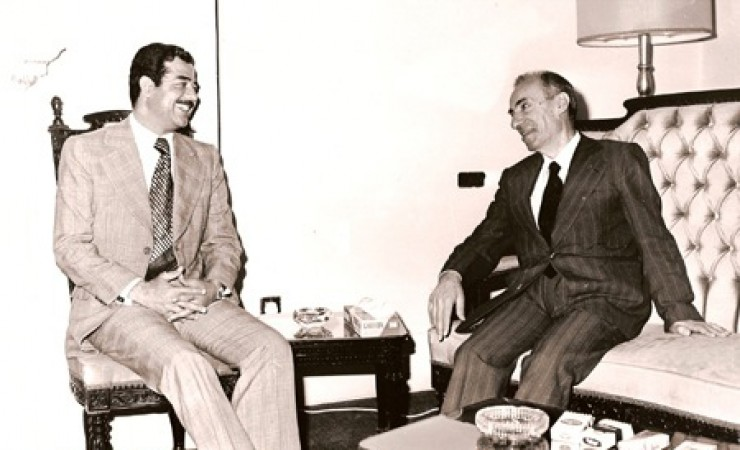
Saddam Hussein (left) talking with Michel Aflaq in 1979.

Saddam Hussein and his ideologists sought to fuse a connection between the ancient Babylonian and Assyrian civilizations in Iraq to Arab nationalism by claiming that the Babylonians and ancient Assyrians are the ancestors of the Arabs. Thus, Saddam Hussein and his supporters claim that there is no conflict between Mesopotamian heritage and Arab nationalism.

Saddam Hussein based his political views and ideology upon the views of Aflaq, Ba'athism's key founder. Saddam was also an avid reader of topics on moral and material forces in international politics. His government was critical of orthodox Marxism, opposing the orthodox Marxist concepts of class conflict, the dictatorship of the proletariat and atheism; it opposed Marxism–Leninism's claim that non-Marxist–Leninist parties are automatically bourgeois in nature, claiming that the Ba'ath Party was a popular revolutionary movement and the people rejected petit bourgeois politics. Saddam claimed that the Arab nation did not have the class structure of other nations, and class division was more along national lines (between Arabs and non-Arabs) than within the Arab community. However, he spoke fondly of Vladimir Lenin and commended Lenin for giving Russian Marxism a uniquely Russian specificity which Marx alone was incapable of doing. He also expressed admiration for other communist leaders (such as Fidel Castro, Ho Chi Minh and Josip Broz Tito) for their spirit of asserting national independence, rather than for their communism.

==== The Return to Faith Campaign ====
In 1993, the Iraqi regime embarked on the Return to Faith Campaign (al-Hamlah al-Imaniyyah), under the supervision of Izzat Ibrahim al-Douri. The ultimate aim of this new policy was to encourage popular devotion to Islam within Iraqi society.

Up until the invasion of Kuwait in 1991, the Iraqi regime had espoused the secular ideology of Ba'athism. This started to change when Saddam, who wished to bolster the Iraqi government's Islamic credentials, implemented a variety of reforms. The Iraqi flag had the takbīr added on to it. The Ministry of Endowments and Religious Affairs appointed clergy, approved the building and repair of mosques and approved the publication of Islamic literature. The Faith Campaign allowed Sunni mosques more freedom in practicing religious ceremonies and rites, which reduced substantially the opposition to the regime among Sunni Islamists.

Saddam coordinated the media and educational system to put heavy emphasis on Islamic identity. Religious academic institutions were opening up across the country, and Qu'ranic and Islamic studies were introduced into the curriculum at all school levels. A religious radio station, al-Qu'ran al-Karim Radio was set up to expand and promote Islam in Iraqi life. Aspects of the Shari'ah were adopted into the Iraqi judicial system. Judges were required to study courses on Islamic jurisprudence. The selling and consumption of alcohol was curtailed by the state. Establishments which involved the vices of gambling or alcohol were restricted or closed. Prostitution was deemed illegal and punishable by death. The Fedayeen Saddam, the paramilitary force loyal to the regime were well known for beheading suspected prostitutes. Thieves were punished with amputation. Saddam Hussein introduced in a new penal code article 111, exempting from punishment a man who kills a woman in defense of the honour of his family.

This new influx of religious involvement into the government had sectarian undertones. The government's attempt to cloak itself in Islamic conservatism saw it launch verbal attacks on Iran, which were perceived by Shia Iraqis as being veiled attacks on their community, due to the shared faith between them and Iran. Sunni rhetoric emitting from the Iraqi government sought to discredit Iran, with scathing criticism stating that they were subscribing to a " foreign and heretical form of religion". While daily newspaper Babil, owned by Saddam's eldest son Uday Hussein, once was considered a staunch opponent of the campaign, arguing that it would undermine Iraq's religiously pluralistic society and encourage sectarian division, at another point it railed against Shias, referring to them as rafidah, a hateful epithet normally used by ultraconservative Salafis only.

== Foreign policy ==
=== Relations with the Soviet Union ===
The Ba'ath Party policy towards the Soviet Union was, at first, one of neutrality and the party's seizure of power in 1968 was not considered an important event in Moscow. The Soviet Union (which remembered the Ba'ath Party's anti-communist purge during its 1963 stint in power) gradually improved its relations with Iraq; in 1969, it guaranteed Iraq a sizable amount of modern arms and technical aid. Relations improved during the nationalisation drive of the Iraqi Petroleum Company (IPC) (see "Economic growth" section). Saddam Hussein visited the Soviet Union in the early 1970s, and the visit led to the signing of the Iraqi–Soviet Treaty of Friendship and Co-operation and the establishment of trade relations. In April 1972 Alexei Kosygin, Chairman of the Council of Ministers, visited Iraq and met with high-ranking officials. Kosygin's visit forced the Iraqi Communist Party (ICP) to improve its relations with the Ba'ath Party; two ICP members were given cabinet positions and repression of the ICP ended. Relations between Iraq and the Soviet Union were at its zenith during al-Bakr's rule. Iraq became a member of the Comecon (the Eastern Bloc trading organisation) as an observer in 1975.

During the early years of al-Bakr's rule, the Soviet Union became a strategic ally. However, with the increase in oil revenues relations between Iraq and the Soviet Union weakened. The Iraqi regime was given more freedom of choice, and lost its dependence on Soviet investments. The Soviet Union, during this period, retained its role as Iraq's largest arms supplier. With Iraq's foreign-policy priorities changing, repression against the ICP was reintroduced. The Soviet Union tried to act as a mediator between the two parties, but Soviet involvement was considered by the Ba'athist government as Soviet interference in Iraq's internal affairs. During the Iran–Iraq War Leonid Brezhnev, General Secretary of the Central Committee of the Communist Party of the Soviet Union, called the war "absolutely senseless" because the conflict only benefited imperialism. However, Soviet-Iranian relations deteriorated during the war due to Iran's support for anti-communist forces in the Afghan Democratic Republic. During Yuri Andropov's rule of the Soviet Union, there were rumors that the USSR was increasing its shipments of modern arms to Iraq during its war with Iran. This proved to be wrong, and Saddam openly complained that the Treaty of Friendship signed with the Soviet Union "has not worked." During the rule of Konstantin Chernenko, the Soviet Union's relations with Iran further deteriorated as the Soviet leadership began to criticise Islamic fundamentalism. In 1986, under Mikhail Gorbachev, the Soviet Union officially changed its position from neutral to that of "active containment" of Iran. This policy lasted until the war with Iran ended in 1988. During the Iraqi invasion of Kuwait and the following Gulf War, the Soviet Union was officially neutral. Shortly after, on 26 December 1991, the Soviet Union was officially dissolved.

=== Relations with the United States ===
Throughout the Cold War, Iraq had been an ally of the Soviet Union, and there was a history of friction between Iraq and the United States. According to historian Charles R. H. Tripp, the Iraqi–Soviet Treaty of Friendship and Co-operation upset "the U.S.-sponsored security system established as part of the Cold War in the Middle East. It appeared that any enemy of the Baghdad regime was a potential ally of the United States." In response, the U.S. covertly provided $16 million in aid to Kurdistan Democratic Party rebels led by Mustafa Barzani during the Second Iraqi–Kurdish War. The U.S. was concerned with Iraq's position on Israeli–Palestinian politics. The U.S. also disliked Iraqi support for Palestinian militant groups, which led to Iraq's inclusion on the developing U.S. list of State Sponsors of Terrorism in December 1979. The U.S. remained officially neutral after Iraq's invasion of Iran in 1980. In March 1982, however, Iran began a successful counter-offensive, and the U.S. increased its support for Iraq to prevent Iran from forcing a surrender. In a U.S. bid to open full diplomatic relations with Iraq, the country was removed from the U.S. list of State Sponsors of Terrorism. Ostensibly this was because of improvement in the regime's record, although former U.S. Assistant Defense Secretary Noel Koch later stated, "No one had any doubts about [the Iraqis'] continued involvement in terrorism. ... The real reason was to help them succeed in the war against Iran."

== Economy ==
=== Planning system ===
Since it did not have an economic policy of its own, the Ba'ath Party, when it took power in 1968, allowed the Five-Year Plan set up by the previous regime in 1965 to continue until its end date in 1969. The Revolutionary Command Council (RCC) decided by the mid-1970s to alter the planning system; instead of creating stable Five-Year Plans (as had been done earlier), an annual investment plan was to be created. Every year, the RCC convened to create an investment for the year to come; for example, there were separate investment plans for 1976 and 1977. Another change is that the plan's final draft was not accepted by the highest economic elite but by the RCC, the political elite. In 1976 (as a break with the new trend) the RCC introduced the National Development Plan, which was set to last from 1976 to 1980. Unlike the previous plans, the sectoral investment-allocation figures were not made public.

=== Economic growth ===
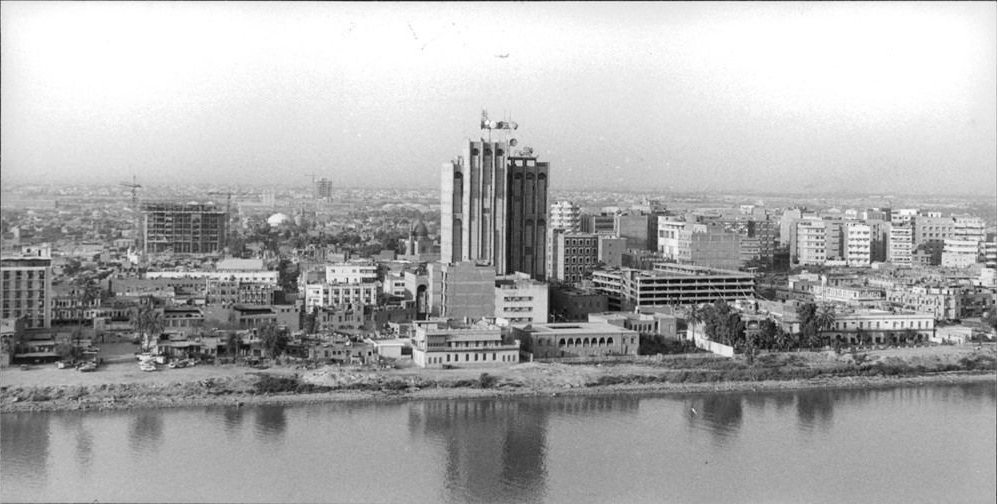
A view of modern Baghdad with the Tigris in the foreground. The skyscraper in the center is the Baghdad telecommunications building.

The Iraq Petroleum Company (IPC), the largest oil company in Iraq, was a private company. In March 1970, the IPC was forced to concede 20 percent of the company's share to the government. The full nationalisation of the IPC occurred after the company cut its oil production by half in March 1972; the decision would, in the short term, hamper Iraq's economic growth. The company was nationalised in June 1972. The nationalisation removed the last remaining element of foreign control over Iraq, and was popular with the Iraqi people. The government anticipated a loss of revenue, and therefore sent Saddam Hussein to the Soviet Union to negotiate a treaty. The visit was a success, and ended with the signing of the Iraqi–Soviet Treaty of Friendship and Co-operation and the establishment of a trade agreement. The trade agreement stated that the Soviet Union would buy some of Iraq's oil to soften the anticipated blow it would have on Iraq's oil exports. The signing of a treaty with the Soviet Union led to a visit by Alexei Kosygin (Chairman of the Council of Ministers) and the appointment of two cabinet ministers from the Iraqi Communist Party.

After the nationalisation of the IPC, Iraq's oil revenue increased from 219 million ID in 1972 to 1.7 billion ID in 1974, 3.7 billion ID in 1978 and 8.9 billion ID in 1980: by over 40 times in less than a decade. With the success of the Iranian revolution, Iraq became the second-largest oil exporter in the world. The increase in oil exports rejuvenated the country's economy; nearly all economic indices increased to unprecedented levels. From 1970 to 1980, Iraq's economy grew by 11.7 percent. During the Iran–Iraq War Iraq's oil-exporting capabilities decreased, and the price for oil decreased simultaneously. The growth of the 1970s was not sustainable. The economy was dependent on high oil prices and Iraq's oil-exporting capabilities; once oil was out of the picture, Iraq's growth would decrease dramatically (even more so during a war).

The National Development Plan (1976–1980) ended with an 11-percent increase in GNP. The Iran–Iraq War would halt Iraq's economic development and lead to the economic stagnation seen during Saddam's later rule. When Iraq implemented its plans to bomb Iran, Iran retaliated by bombing Iraq's oil facilities. By the end of the year, Iraq's oil exports had decreased by 72 percent because of Iran's bombing strategy. In terms of actual income, oil exports as government revenue decreased from $26.1 billion in 1980 to $10.4 billion in 1981. With oil facilities in the Persian Gulf destroyed the Iraqi regime had no choice but to export oil over land, which was far more expensive. Other problems were the gradual erosion of the government's hard currency and its steadily increasing foreign debt.

=== Demise of development ===
At the beginning of the war the Iraqi government had a monetary reserve of $35 billion, and the annual growth rate was 27.9 percent. During the early war years, ambitious development plans were followed; because of high military spending (approaching 50 percent of GNP in 1982), the Iraqi economy began showing signs of bankruptcy in the mid-to-late 1980s. The war had cost the Iraqi government 226 billion dollars, which in turn had led to a staggering foreign debt of between 80 and 100 billion dollars. The rate of debt increase was estimated to be 10 billion a year. Another problem facing the regime was in agriculture; manpower had been depleted during the war years, and agricultural production plummeted. The situation became even bleaker after the war. Minister of Foreign Affairs Tariq Aziz acknowledged that the situation had become so bad that the Iraqi government could not afford to pay for the food it had imported. Former foreign creditors were reluctant to loan money to Iraq because of the economy's near-bankruptcy.

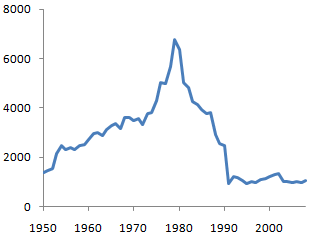
GNP per capita in Iraq from 1950 to 2008.

When the war started, Saddam was widely quoted as saying that Iraq faced the war with a two-year supply "of all key commodities."; this proved true. Beginning in October 1982, Iraq's foreign assets began to dwindle as the government failed to repay its loans. At the end of the war, Iraq's monetary reserve had been depleted and international oil prices were not as stable (high) as they had been during the 1970s. The economy was still healthy in late 1982, due to government expenditure on large development programmes. Before the war, Iraq's workforce stood at five million. During the war, one million were mobilised in the war against Iran. Of the million sent to war, 100,000 died. The labour shortage led to stagnation; to fill the gap, an increasing number of women were hired. There was a shift in industrial production during the war from consumer to military goods. Social programmes that had been established in the previous decade began to deteriorate, and the average standard of living decreased.

During the mid-to-late 1980s, international oil prices collapsed. The Organisation for Petroleum Exporting Countries (OPEC) established a quota system in which the international oil price (for its members) was set at US$18 per barrel. This system did not work, as Kuwait and the United Arab Emirates (UAE) did not follow OPEC policy and continued to flood the market with their oil. The result was that international oil prices were still at the 1970s level. In October 1988, because of Kuwait and the UAE, international oil prices had fallen to US$12 per barrel. The policy which the UAE (and especially Kuwait) followed hampered Iraq's economic growth. In the Iran–Iraq War's aftermath, Iraq had grown more dependent on oil prices. The result of Kuwait and the UAE's oil policies could be felt in 1990, when international oil prices decreased to US$13.67 per barrel. This time, the sudden fall in oil prices triggered reactions in Iraq; in Al-Thawra, the Ba'ath Party newspaper, Foreign Minister Aziz criticised Kuwait and the UAE's oil policies. Because of the sudden slump, Saddam claimed at an Arab League conference that international oil prices could increase to US$25 per barrel without hurting exports. Saddam also claimed that the abrupt fall in oil prices decreased Iraq's oil revenue by one billion dollars. Iraq was not the only member criticising Kuwait and the UAE; several other members also criticised their oil-production policy. Kuwait would not budge, continuing its oil-production strategy even when threatened by Iraq. This, coupled with foreign loans Iraq owed to Kuwait, was the main reason for the Iraqi invasion of Kuwait.

=== UN sanctions ===
Following Iraq's defeat in the Gulf War, the United Nations Security Council introduced Resolution 661, which imposed sanctions against Iraq. At the beginning, most American observers believed the sanctions would lead to Saddam's downfall. U.S. President George H. W. Bush said, "Economic sanctions in this instance if fully enforced can be very, very effective, [...] There are some indications that that he's [Saddam] already beginning to feel the pinch and nobody can stand up forever to total economic deprivation." In theory (and practice), Iraq was very vulnerable to sanctions during this time. Thirty percent of its GNP before the Gulf War was used to import food, and 95 percent of Iraq's export earnings came from oil; oil production was 40 percent of GNP. The country was also reliant on foreign trade (35–50 percent of GNP for exported and imported goods). Iraq was also an easy country to blockade economically; its oil exports could be blockaded by closing its pipelines (which ran through Turkey, Jordan and Syria). While sanctions were successful from an economic point of view, politically they failed; Saddam would rule Iraq until 2003.

Throughout the Ba'ath Party's rule over Iraq, the agricultural sector had been under-performing. Those in the United States who supported sanctions believed that low agricultural production in Iraq (coupled with sanctions) would lead to "a hungry population", and "a hungry population was an unruly one". The Iraqi government, which understood the serious effects the sanctions could have on Iraq, were able to increase agricultural output by 24 percent from 1990 to 1991. During the sanction years, the agricultural sector witnessed "a boom of unprecedented proportions". The Revolutionary Command Council (RCC) introduced several decrees during this period to increase agricultural performance. These decrees may be separated into three categories:

- They introduced severe penalties on farmers (or landowners) unable to produce at full capacity on their land.
- Government programmes made it cheaper (and therefore more profitable for farmers and landowners) to produce.
- Programmes were initiated to increase the amount of arable land.

The RCC introduced Decree No. 367 in 1990, which stated that all lands which were not under production by their owners would be taken over by the state; if the owner could not use all the land he owned, he would lose it. However, the RCC's policy was not "all stick and no carrot". The government made it easier for farmers and landowners to receive credit. On 30 September 1990, the Ministry of Agriculture announced that it would increase loans to farmers by 100 percent, and would subsidise machinery and tools. In October 1990, the RCC stated it was planning to utilize and exploit "every inch of Iraqi arable land". While official statistics cannot be trusted entirely, they showed massive growth in arable land: from 16,446 donums in 1980 to 45,046 in 1990. The increase in agricultural output does not mean that hunger was not widespread; prices of foodstuffs increased dramatically during this period. However, overall the sanctions failed and (indirectly) led to an unprecedented improvement in agriculture.

While the agricultural sector improved, most other economic indicators deteriorated. Transport (which had been bombed during the Gulf War) further deteriorated due to the government's neglect. The economy suffered from chronic inflation and currency depreciation; the sanctions exacerbated the structural problems in Iraq's economic system. Iraq was, on balance, a planned economy with market-economy characteristics.

=== Modest growth ===
By the late 1990s, the Iraqi economy showed signs of modest growth. These would continue until 2003 when the government was toppled. The gross domestic product increased from US$10.8 billion in 1996 to US$30.8 billion in 2000. The major factor in this growth was the UN-initiated Oil-for-Food Programme (OFFP). Saddam was originally opposed to the OFFP. The OFFP led to the inflow of hard currency, which helped reduce the country's chronic inflation and reopened old trade routes with foreign countries. It was around this time that many countries started to ignore the UN sanctions. While internal and external trade was revitalised, this did not lead to a significant increase in the standard of living for the majority of the population; on the contrary, the government tried to prevent benefits from flowing to Shi'ite areas to persuade more countries to oppose the sanctions. In 2000, the national income per capita was estimated to be US$1,000 – less than half of what it had been in 1990.

== Military ==
=== Expenditure ===
The Ba'ath regime, like its predecessors, came to power by military force. From Abd al-Karim Qasim until the Ba'athist seizure of power in 1968, the Iraqi government had followed a policy of the militarisation of society. This led to the expansion of the old military elite, which had existed under the Hashemite monarchy. The military elite gradually also evolved into an economic elite, since Iraq was a planned economy; for instance, the government appointed military personnel to senior positions in factories and companies. While the period from 1960 to 1980 was peaceful, expenditure on the military trebled and in 1981 it stood at US$4.3 billion. The government placed more importance on military development than on the civilian sector. In 1981, Iraq's military expenditure nearly equaled the national incomes of Jordan and Yemen combined. The military buildup was made possible because of Iraq's oil production and the high international price for oil. Per capita military spending in 1981 was 370 percent higher than that for education. During the Iran–Iraq War military expenditures increased dramatically (while economic growth was shrinking) and the number of people employed in the military increased fivefold, to one million.

=== Size ===
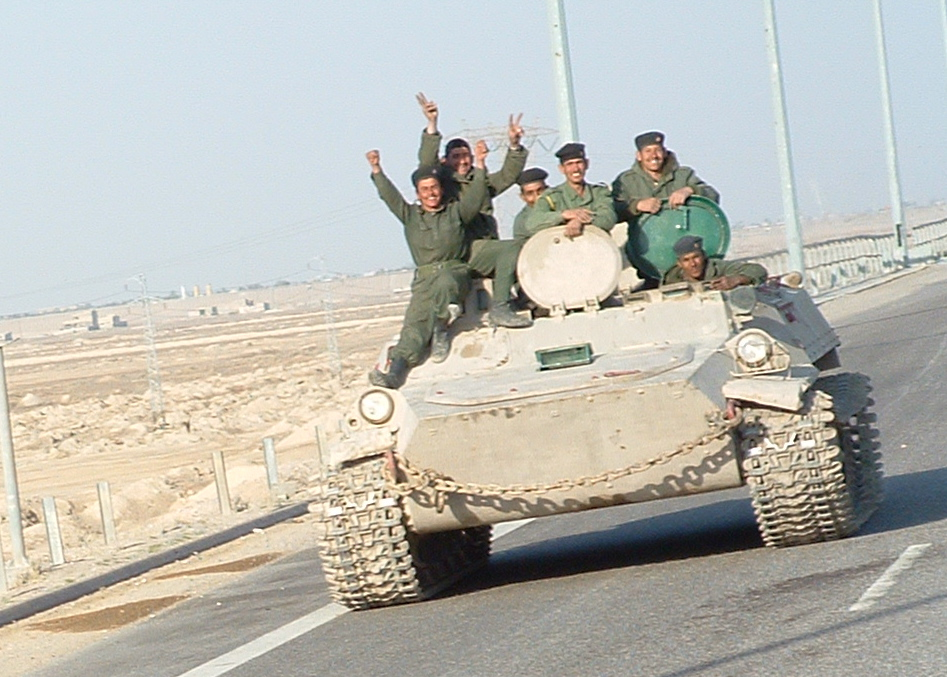
28 February 2003: Iraqi soldiers ride an MT-LB armored vehicle on an Iraqi highway, one month before the start of the Iraq War.

In 1967, the Iraqi army consisted of 50,000 men on two-year service; the Iraqi Air Force had 170 aircraft. In 1980, these numbers had increased to a standing army of 200,000, 250,000 reserves and 250,000 paramilitary troops in the Ba'ath Party-led Popular Army. The army had 2,500 tanks, 335 combat aircraft and 40 combat helicopters. In 1988, at the end of the Iran–Iraq War, Iraq fielded the fourth largest army in the world; the army consisted of 955,000 standing soldiers and 650,000 paramilitary forces in the Popular Army. The army could field 4,500 tanks, 484 combat aircraft and 232 combat helicopters. According to Michael Knights, the Iraqi army fielded one million men and 850,000 reservists; there were 53 divisions, 20 special-forces brigades, and several regional militias. The Iraqi military was able to field 5,500 tanks, 3,000 artillery pieces, the country had a strong air defence and could employ 700 combat aircraft and helicopters. By 1990 (according to Keith Shimko) the Iraqi army fielded nearly one million men, 5,700 tanks, 3,700 artillery pieces and 950 combat aircraft. During the Gulf War the most optimistic military analysis believed that, during an all-out war with the Iraqi military, the United States military would suffer between 17,000 and 30,000 casualties. In the aftermath of the Gulf War the size of the Iraqi military was reduced to an estimated 350,000 standing troops; it could deploy 2,300 main battle tanks, had about 260 combat aircraft and could deploy up to 120 combat helicopters. In 2002, one year before the 2003 invasion, the Iraqi army could deploy 375,000 men. According to the United States Central Command, Iraq's army (standing and reserves) stood at 700,000 men.

Despite this level of militarization, the amount of weapons and spending on the armed forces, the army of Ba'athist Iraq rarely showed itself on the good side. During the Yom Kippur War, Iraq sent an expeditionary force of the 3rd and 6th armored divisions to Syria: it consisted of 30,000 soldiers, 250-300 tanks, 700 armored personnel carriers and about 100 jet fighters. The sent divisions were described as the most combat-ready in the Iraqi army, but their effectiveness on the battlefield was terrible in almost every way: military intelligence, initiative and independent actions of small units were virtually absent, and the Iraqi Air Force lost 26 aircraft without shooting down a single Israeli one. During the Iran-Iraq War, the Iraqi army also got bogged down in heavy fighting with an enemy that it planned to defeat in a short time. Even when Iraq invaded Kuwait, its army was able to occupy the small country only after 2 days. In the Gulf War in 1991 and in the American invasion of Iraq, the army also showed itself very poorly (incidentally, these are the only wars in which Ba'athist Iraq fought a much more modern enemy).

== Culture ==
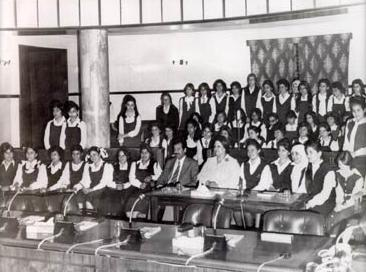
Saddam Hussein and female students. Ba'athism promoted greater participation of women in Iraqi society.

By the end of the 1970s women in Iraq formed 46 per cent of the teachers, 29 per cent of the doctors, 46 per cent of the dentists, 70 per cent of the pharmacists, 15 percent of the accountants, 14 percent of the factory workers and 16 percent of the civil servants.

The Ba'athist era was a period of secularisation in Iraq. The government included people from multiple religious affiliations (including Sunni Muslims, Shia Muslims, Jews and Christians). However, the period was marked (especially under Saddam Hussein) by sectarian, religious and political strife between the government and other groups: Shia Muslims (mainly drawn from Arabs, this religious group formed an absolute majority) who sought to create an Iraqi theocracy; ethnic Kurds, who sought independence for their region; Sunnis with an Islamist ideology, and non-Ba'athists (such as the Iraqi communists who were heavily suppressed in 1978). The Iraqi government promoted women's rights to a degree, allowing them education and service in the armed forces, but – despite the Ba'ath's avowed "radicalism" – its changes to family law were "considerably less radical than ... the Shah's family reforms, to say nothing of Atatürk's radical break with Islamic family law in 1926." The government sought restoration of Iraqi cultural heritage, such as rebuilding replicas of parts of the ancient city of Babylon. Under Saddam Hussein, the glorification of Saddam and the Ba'athist government was common in state-sponsored artwork. The Ba'ath Party dominated the political life of the country, although a National Progressive Front was proclaimed in 1974 to allow for the (mostly nominal) participation of non-Ba'athist figures and parties in Iraqi politics.

During the Gulf War, Saddam Hussein sought to gain support from the Muslim religious community for the government, adding the Takbir to the flag, coat of arms and motto of Iraq.

== Space program ==
Under Saddam Hussein, Iraq maintained a domestic space program. Ba'athist Iraq began its space efforts in earnest around 1988. The program operated under several names, including the declared name of Al Abid (العابد) as well as alternate names such as Bird (الطائر) and Comet. Iraq began development of its indigenous space program after an effort to cooperate with another unnamed country failed. However, according to UNMOVIC, at least one other country provided assistance, and one or two additional countries were also sought for help, but did not provide it.

== Public holidays ==
Date	English name	Arabic name	Significance and context
6 January	Army Day	عيد الجيش	Commemorating the anniversary of the founding of the Iraqi Army in 1921.
8 February	Ramadan Revolution Day	عروس الثورات	Celebrating the 1963 coup that initiated the first Ba'athist rule in the country.
17 April	Al-Fao Liberation Day	يوم تحرير الفاو	Commemorating the recapture of the Fao Peninsula and the Iraqi coastline following two years of Iranian occupation.
17–30 July	17–30 July Revolution	ثورة 17-30 تموز	An important official holiday in Ba'athist political ideology; July 17 marked a joint success between the Ba'athists and dissident officers from the Abdul Rahman Arif regime, whereas July 30 marked the event in which Ahmed Hassan al-Bakr and Saddam Hussein successfully overthrew their former partners.
8 August	Victory Day	يوم النصر العظيم	Commemorating the 1988 ceasefire that signaled the end of the eight-year war with Iran.

== Flags and coats of arms ==
Flag (1963–1991)

Flag (1991–2004)

Coat of arms (1965–1991)

Coat of arms (1991–2004)

== See also ==
- Ba'ath Party archives
- Ba'athist Syria
