= Voice of Iraq =

Voice of Iraq إذاعة صوت العراق
- Baghdad; Iraq
- Frequency: 1179 kHz

Programming
- Languages: Arabic, Iraqi Turkish
- Format: News, current affairs and music
- Affiliations: International Agency for Free Media

History
- First air date: August 27, 2003

Links
- Website: www.voiraq.com

The Voice of Iraq (Arabic: إذاعة صوت العراق lit: Idha'atu Sawt Il-Iraq) is a privately owned radio station in Iraq that has broadcast since August 27, 2003. It broadcasts in Arabic, Iraqi Turkish and English on 1179 kHz medium wave in Baghdad and nearby towns including Ba'qubah and Fallujah to an area with 12 million inhabitants. Voice of Iraq is supervised by the International Agency for Free Media, which is a media institution that was active abroad during the Saddam Hussein regime and covered Iraqi news via the Internet.

== Editorial policy ==
The editorial policy of the Voice of Iraq is supportive of national unity, on the basis that Arabs, Kurds and Turkomans, Assyrians should have equal rights. Programmes include news reports and panel discussions of current affairs, combined with Shi'a religious and patriotic songs.

== Other radio stations of the same name ==
Prior to the formation of "Voice of Iraq" in 2003, the name had been used previously by several radio stations including an English language FM station owned by Uday Hussein. There were also an Egyptian Government funded radio station that operated between 1958 and 1959, which advocated pan-Arabism and supported Abdul Karim Qassim. In addition there was another radio station that operated in 1959 that was a black propaganda effort that mimicked the pro-Qassim station but attacked his government and was widely considered to be U.S. funded.

The Voice of Iraq radio station should also not be confused with the independent daily Iraqi newspaper with the similar name Sawt al-Iraq (Voice of Iraq) which launched in 2002.

== See also ==
- Communications in Iraq
- Music of Iraq
- Voices of Iraq an unrelated 2004 documentary film about Iraq
