= List of Shia Muslims =

The following is a list of notable Shia Muslims.

== Scientists, mathematicians and academics ==
- Ali ibn Ridwan – Egyptian Muslim physician, astrologer, astronomer, philosopher
- Haider Alhassen
- Al-ʻIjliyyah – 10th-century female maker of astrolabes
- Ibn al-Nadim – 10th century bibliophile of Baghdad and compiler of the Arabic bibliographic-biographic encyclopedia Kitāb al-Fihrist ('The Book Catalogue')
- Hamid al-Din al-Kirmani – Persian philosopher
- Sharaf al-Dīn al-Ṭūsī – astronomer, mathematician
- Bahāʾ al-dīn al-ʿĀmilī – Arab Shia Islamic scholar, philosopher, architect, mathematician, astronomer and poet who lived in the late 16th and early 17th centuries.
- Mo'ayyeduddin Urdi – Arab Muslim astronomer, mathematician, architect and engineer
- Ibn al-Tiqtaqa – Iraqi Arab Muslim historian
- Iskandar Beg Munshi – court historian of the Safavid emperor Shah Abbas I
- Mirza Mehdi Khan Astarabadi – chief secretary, historian, biographer, advisor, strategist.
- Mulla Sadra – philosopher, founder of existentialism and transcendent theosophy
- Mir Damad – Iranian philosopher
- Hassan Kamel Al-Sabbah – electrical and electronics research engineer, mathematician and inventor.
- Rammal Rammal – Lebanese condensed matter physicist
- Allama Rasheed Turabi – Hyderabad, India later migrated to Pakistan theologian, scholar, philosopher
- Kazem Behbehani – Kuwaiti immunologist and retired professor. He has done research on tropical diseases before he became an international health advocate at WHO.
- Lotfi Asker Zadeh – Iranian computer scientist; founder of fuzzy mathematics and fuzzy set theory.
- Cumrun Vafa – Iranian-American theoretical physicist at Harvard, Winner of Breakthrough Prize
- Nima Arkani-Hamed – Iranian-American theoretical physicist at Princeton, winner of Breakthrough Prize
- Ehsan Afshari – Professor of Electrical Engineering and Computer Science at the University of Michigan
- Ali Javan – Iranian-American physicist and inventor
- Yasaman Farzan – Iranian theoretical physicist
- Saba Valadkhan – Iranian biomedical researcher
- Fereydoon Family – Iranian physicist
- Mahmoud Hessaby – Iranian physicist
- Iraj Malekpour – Iranian physicist
- Mehran Kardar – theoretical physicist, MIT
- Omid Kordestani – senior vice president, Worldwide Sales and Fields Operations, Google
- Ali Hajimiri – Caltech, co-founder of Axiom Microdevices
- Payam Heydari – electrical engineer and computer scientist, University of California Irvine
- Ali Khademhosseini – Iranian-American-Canadian biomedical engineer at Harvard
- Babak Hassibi – electrical engineer, Caltech
- Caro Lucas – Iranian Armenian scientist
- Ali Chamseddine – Lebanese theoretical physicist
- Wissam S. al-Hashimi – Iraqi geologist
- Husain Mohammad Jafri – academician
- Athar Ali – Pakistani system engineer and a rocket scientist
- Pervez Hoodbhoy – nuclear physicist and activist
- Agha Shahi – diplomat and technocrat
- Razi Abedi – literary figure, activist and scholar of Pakistan
- Nayyar Ali Zaidi – Pakistani architect
- Kalbe Razi Naqvi – British Pakistani physicist
- Aziz Sancar – American scientist
- Ahmed Zewail – American chemist
- Kalbe Sadiq – Academic and reformer

== Historical political figures ==
=== Late Islamic history ===
- Syed Muhammad Mir Ali Naqvi – Chief Justice of the court of Akbar the Great, Mir Adal; served on the court, 1579–1581; governor of Sindh
- Hasan ibn Zayd – founder of the Alavids dynasty
- Al-Hadi ila'l-Haqq Yahya – founder of the Zaidi imamate State
- Sayf al-Daula – ruler of the Hamdanid dynasty (945–967)
- Mu'izz al-Daula – ruler of the Buyid dynasty (945–967)
- Abu 'Abdullah al-Shi'i – a Da'i for the Isma'ilis in Yemen and North Africa mainly among the Kutama Berbers, whose teachings influenced the rise of the Fatimid dynasty
- Ubayd Allah al-Mahdi Billah – founder of the Fatimid dynasty
- Al-Muizz Lideenillah – fourth Fatimid Caliph Founder of the city of Cairo
- Sitt al-Mulk – ruler of the Fatimids (1021–1023); elder sister of Al-Hakim
- Arwa al-Sulayhi – ruler, first through her two husbands and then alone, of Yemen
- Sharifa Fatima – Zaydi chief in 15th-century Yemen
- Salih ibn Mirdas – founder of the Mirdasids emirate
- Muhammad ibn al-Musayyib – founder of the Uqaylid Dynasty
- Muhammad Quli Qutb Shah - ruler of the Golconda Sultanate founder of the city of Hyderabad
- Öljaitü – eighth Ilkhanate ruler
- Ismail I – founder of the Safavid dynasty
- Abbas I of Persia – ruler of the Safavid dynasty (1588–1629)
- Karim Khan – founder of the Zand dynasty

== Poets ==
- Ferdowsi – Iranian national poet
- Ali ibn Ridwan – Egyptian Muslim physician, astrologer, astronomer, philosopher
- Al-ʻIjliyyah – 10th-century female maker of astrolabes
- Ibn al-Nadim – 10th century bibliophile of Baghdad and compiler of the Arabic bibliographic-biographic encyclopedia Kitāb al-Fihrist ('The Book Catalogue')
- Hamid al-Din al-Kirmani – Persian philosopher
- Sharaf al-Dīn al-Ṭūsī – astronomer, mathematician
- Bahāʾ al-dīn al-ʿĀmilī – Arab Shia Islamic scholar, philosopher, architect, mathematician, astronomer and poet who lived in the late 16th and early 17th centuries.
- Mo'ayyeduddin Urdi – Arab Muslim astronomer, mathematician, architect and engineer
- Ibn al-Tiqtaqa – Iraqi Arab Muslim historian
- Iskandar Beg Munshi – court historian of the Safavid emperor Shah Abbas I
- Mirza Mehdi Khan Astarabadi – chief secretary, historian, biographer, advisor, strategist.
- Mulla Sadra – philosopher, founder of existentialism and transcendent theosophy
- Mir Damad – Iranian philosopher
- Hassan Kamel Al-Sabbah – electrical and electronics research engineer, mathematician and inventor.
- Rammal Rammal – Lebanese condensed matter physicist
- Allama Rasheed Turabi – Hyderabad, India later migrated to Pakistan theologian, scholar, philosopher
- Kazem Behbehani – Kuwaiti immunologist and retired professor. He has done research on tropical diseases before he became an international health advocate at WHO.
- Lotfi Asker Zadeh – Iranian computer scientist; founder of fuzzy mathematics and fuzzy set theory.
- Cumrun Vafa – Iranian-American theoretical physicist at Harvard, Winner of Breakthrough Prize
- Nima Arkani-Hamed – Iranian-American theoretical physicist at Princeton, winner of Breakthrough Prize
- Ali Javan – Iranian-American physicist and inventor
- Yasaman Farzan – Iranian theoretical physicist
- Zulfiqar Naqvi – Indian Poet and Author
- Saba Valadkhan – Iranian biomedical researcher
- Fereydoon Family – Iranian physicist
- Mahmoud Hessaby – Iranian physicist
- Iraj Malekpour – Iranian physicist
- Mehran Kardar – theoretical physicist, MIT
- Omid Kordestani – Senior Vice President, Worldwide Sales and Fields Operations, Google
- Ali Hajimiri – Caltech, co-founder of Axiom Microdevices
- Payam Heydari – electrical engineer and computer scientist, University of California Irvine
- Ali Khademhosseini – Iranian-American-Canadian biomedical engineer at Harvard
- Babak Hassibi – electrical engineer, Caltech
- Caro Lucas – Iranian Armenian scientist
- Ali Chamseddine – Lebanese theoretical physicist
- Wissam S. al-Hashimi – Iraqi geologist
- Husain Mohammad Jafri – academician
- Athar Ali – Pakistani system engineer and a rocket scientist
- Pervez Hoodbhoy – nuclear physicist and activist
- Agha Shahi – diplomat and technocrat
- Razi Abedi – literary figure, activist and scholar of Pakistan
- Nayyar Ali Zaidi – Pakistani architect
- Kalbe Razi Naqvi – British Pakistani physicist
- Shah Nimatullah Wali — Iranian Poet and Writer

== Poets and writers ==
- Grand Ayatollah Muhammad Hussain Najafi - He Wrote Several Influential Books Which Massively Changed The Minds Of Most Shia Muslim Of Pakistan
- Syed Ali Haider Nazam Tabatabai – translated Thomas Gray's Elegy Written in a Country Churchyard from poem to poem in Urdu. (1854 Luckhnow-1933 Hyderabad Deccan India). He was head of Translation Department of Usmania University, could speak write and understand English, German, French, Persian and Arabic.
- Mir Anis – classical Urdu poet and master of the elegies in honor of the tragedy of Karbala known as Marsiya which was instrumental in the propagation of azadari, or mourning of Muharram in South Asia
- Mirza Dabeer – Urdu poet and master of the Marsiya, contemporary, friend, and rival of Mir Anis
- Safi al-din al-Hilli (1278 – c. 1349) – Iraqi poet
- Muhammad Mahdi Al-Jawahiri – Iraqi poet
- Abdullah Al-Baradouni – Yemeni writer and poet
- Ebrahim Al-Arrayedh – Bahrani poet
- Qassim Haddad – Bahrani poet, researcher, writer
- Ali Al Jallawi – Bahrani poet
- Badawi al-Jabal – Syrian poet
- Qurratulain Hyder – (She was Sunni but widely thought of as shia because of her name, Hyder..) female novelist and writer regarded as the "Grande Dame of Urdu literature"
- Ali Akbar Natiq – Pakistani poet and writer
- Adunis – Syrian poet and writer
- Muhammed Almagut – Syrian poet and writer
- Badr Shakir al-Sayyab – Iraqi poet
- Nazik Al-Malaika – influential contemporary Iraqi female poet
- Bint al-Huda – Iraqi educator and political activist
- Hasan Zyko Kamberi – Albanian poet and writer
- Naim Frashëri – Albanian poet and writer
- Sami Frashëri – Albanian poet and writer
- Abdyl Frashëri – Albanian poet and writer
- Shahriar – Iranian poet
- Agha Shahid Ali – Kashmiri-American poet
- Mirza Ghalib

== Professionals ==
- Fakhruddin T. Khorakiwala – Indian businessman and Sheriff of Mumbai
- Muhammad Hussain Inoki – Japanese retired professional wrestler, martial artist, politician, and promoter of professional wrestling and mixed martial arts
- Tabish Hussain – English footballer

== Politicians ==
=== Albania ===
- Xhafer Bej Ypi – former prime minister of Albania
- Mehdi Bej Frashëri – former prime minister of Albania
- Ibrahim Biçakçiu – former prime minister of Albania

=== America / United States ===
- Zohran Mamdani — democrat mayor of New York

=== Azerbaijan ===
- Heydar Aliyev – former president of Azerbaijan
- Ilham Aliyev – current president of Azerbaijan
- Ali Asadov – current prime minister of Azerbaijan
- Vilayət Eyvazov – current union home minister

=== Bahrain ===
- Abdul Amir al-Jamri – 'spiritual leader' of Bahrain's Twelver Shi'a population and the 1990s Intifada
- Hasan Mushaima – secretary-general of the current Haq Movement
- Ali Salman – secretary-general of the current Al-Wefaq
- Abdulhadi Al Khawaja – leading Bahraini human rights activist
- Nabeel Rajab – president of the Bahrain Center for Human Rights

=== Bangladesh ===
- Nawab Ali Abbas Khan, Jatiya Party politician and three-time MP for Maulvibazar-2
- Nawab Ali Haider Khan, 9th Nawab of Longla, minister and leader of the Independent Muslim Party

=== India ===
- Fazl Ali – governor and justice of Supreme Court Of India
- Kaifi Azmi – poet
- Tanveer Zaidi - actor
- Bismillah Khan – musician
- Saiyid Nurul Hasan – professor
- Altamas Kabir
- Ayatullah Syed Abul Hasan Rizvi Kishmiri – Shia Mujtah
- Ayatullah Syed Mohammad Baqir Rizvi – Shia jurist
- Syed_Aqeel-ul-Gharavi – Shia Cleric and Scholar
- Syed Kirmani
- Mir Anis - Famous Urdu Poet (Marsiya Writer)
- Mirza Dabeer - Famous Urdu Poet (Marsiya Writer)
- Bukkal Nawab - Politician
- Mohammad Islam Khan - Indian glycobiologist and a scientist at the National Chemical Laboratory
- Mirza Muhammad Rafi Sauda
- Javed Abidi
- Nawab of Banganapalle
- Nawab of Masulipatam
- Intezar Abidi – politician
- Sir Sultan Ahmed
- Mir Sadiq
- Sayyed Mahmud Khan
- Kamal Amrohi
- Shabana Azmi
- Azim Premji – Indian business tycoon
- Syed Shahnawaz Hussain – former union cabinet minister of Government of India
- Syed Kirmani – cricketer
- Bade Ghulam Ali Khan – singer
- Nawab of Rampur – king
- Nawab of Lucknow – king
- Nargis Dutt – actress
- Naushad – music director
- Salim–Sulaiman – musician
- Jagdeep
- Muzaffar Ali
- Farah Naaz
- Akbar Khan
- Mukhtar Abbas Naqvi – Union Minister govt. India
- M. F. Hussain – painter
- S. H. Raza – painter
- Salim Ali – ornithologist
- Saeed Naqvi – journalist
- Syed Ahmed – Governor of Jharkhand
- Mohsin Zaidi – poet
- Aga Syed Mustafa Moosavi – Shia scholar
- Hasan Asghar Zaidi Adv
- Adv.Mohammad Abbas Ashraf Ali

=== Iran ===
- Amir Kabir – Prime Minister of Persia under Nasereddin Shah
- Mohammad Reza Pahlavi – last Shah of Iran from 1941 until his overthrow due to the 1979 Iranian Revolution
- Mohammed Mosaddeq – former prime minister of Iran
- Ruhollah Khomeini – marja, philosopher and leader of the 1979 Iranian Revolution
- Ali Khamenei – marja, third president and current supreme leader of Iran
- Mehdi Bazargan – former prime minister of Iran
- Mohammad-Javad Bahonar – former prime minister of Iran (killed by terrorists)
- Abolhassan Banisadr – first president of Iran following the Iranian Revolution
- Mohammad-Ali Rajai − second president of Iran (killed by terrorists)
- Mostafa Chamran – Iranian defense minister, first commander of the Pasdaran and founding member of the Freedom Movement of Iran
- Akbar Hashemi Rafsanjani – fourth president of Iran and current head of the Expediency Discernment Council
- Mohammad Khatami – leading reformist Iranian politician and fifth president of Iran
- Mahmoud Ahmadinejad – sixth president of Iran and former mayor of Tehran
- Hassan Rouhani – seventh and current president of Iran and former chief nuclear negotiator
- Ali Larijani – Iranian philosopher and speaker of the Iranian parliament
- Ali Akbar Mohtashami-Pur – reformist Iranian politician and coordinator of Hezbollah in its early days

=== Iraq ===
- Muhammad Fadhel al-Jamali – Iraqi foreign minister, and Prime Minister of Iraq
- Naji Talib – former prime minister of Iraq
- Ezzedine Salim – former Iraqi politician
- Ibrahim al-Jaafari – former prime minister of Iraq
- Nouri al-Maliki – former prime minister of Iraq
- haider al-Abadi – current prime minister of Iraq
- Adil Abdul-Mahdi – Iraqi Shi'a politician, economist
- Mohammed Baqir al-Hakim – former leader of Islamic Supreme Council of Iraq
- Abdul Aziz al-Hakim – leader of Islamic Supreme Council of Iraq
- Jalal al-Din Ali al-Saghir – Iraqi politician and a member of parliament in the Islamic Supreme Council of Iraq
- Mohammad Bahr al-Ulloum – prominent Twelver Shi'a Islamic leader and politician in Iraq
- Muqtada al-Sadr – Iraqi politician and head of the Mahdi Army
- Ahmed Chalabi – Iraqi politician
- Abbas al-Bayati – Iraqi Shiite Turkmen politician
- Jasim Mohammed Jaafar – Iraqi Shiite Turkmen politician
- Hussain al-Shahristani – current Iraqi minister of oil
- Shirwan al-Waili – current Iraqi minister of state for national security
- Mowaffak al-Rubaie – current Iraqi national security advisor
- Baqir Jabr al-Zubeidi – current finance minister of Iraq
- Khaled al-Attiyah -elected First Deputy Speaker of the Iraqi National Assembly
- Salama al-Khufaji – former member of the Council of Representatives of Iraq
- Safia Taleb Ali al-Suhail – Iraqi politician and a member of the Council of Representatives of Iraq

=== Kuwait ===
- Adnan Zahid Abdulsamad – member of the National Assembly of Kuwait
- Ahmed Lari – member of the National Assembly of Kuwait
- Ali Hussain Al-Awadhi – journalist and politician
- Hussein Al-Qallaf Al-Bahraini – member of the National Assembly of Kuwait
- Hassan Jawhar – member of the National Assembly of Kuwait
- Rola Dashti – member of the National Assembly of Kuwait
- Massouma al-Mubarak – Kuwait's first female minister
- Ibtihal Al-Khatib – secular academic and politician
- Saleh Ashour – member of the Kuwaiti parliament
- Hassan Jawhar – member of the Kuwaiti parliament

=== Lebanon ===
- Adel Osseiran – one of the founders of modern Lebanon
- Musa al-Sadr – contemporary Islamic philosopher and co-founder of the Amal Movement
- Muhammad Hussein Fadlallah (also Muhammad Husayn Fadl-Allāh or Sayyed Muhammad Hussein Fadl-Allāh) (born 1935) – prominent Lebanese Twelver Shi'a Muslim cleric
- Hussein el-Husseini – former speaker of the Lebanese Parliament, co-founder of the Amal Movement, fathered the Taif Agreement that led to the end of the Lebanese Civil War
- Nabih Berri – Speaker of the Parliament of Lebanon; head of the mostly Shi'a Amal Movement
- Abbas Musawi – former secretary-general of Hezbollah
- Hassan Nasrallah – Secretary-General of Hezbollah
- Imad Mughniyah – former head of Hezbollah's external security apparatus
- Ali Qanso – former secretary-general of Syrian Social Nationalist Party
- Ali Eid – Secretary-General of Arabic Democratic Party

=== Pakistan ===
- Nadeem Afzal Chan
- Iskander Mirza – first president of Pakistan
- Muhammad Musa – Pakistan's Commander-in-Chief of the Army during 1965 Indo-Pak war and later Governor of Balochistan
- Nayyar Hussain Bukhari – Chairman of Senate of Pakistan
- Syed Mehdi Shah – former chief minister of GB Province
- Haider Abbas Rizvi
- Fakhar Imam
- Makhdoom Faisal Saleh Hayat
- Faisal Sabzwari
- Ali Zaidi
- Firdous Ashiq Awan
- Mushahid Hussain
- Shehla Raza
- Qaim Ali Shah
- Murad Ali Shah
- Mamnoon Hussain
- Tahir Hussain Mashhadi
- Zulfi Bukhari

Advocate Chairman Collages Scholars'

- Grand Ayatullah Hafiz Bashir Husseyn Najafi
- Grand Ayatullah Muhammad Hussain Najafi – Sargodha
- Allama Arif Hussain Al-Hussaini
- Allama Sajid Ali Naqvi – Quaid e Millat e Jaffaria

=== Syria ===
- Zaki al-Arsuzi – Syrian political activist and writer
- Assad Family – Syrian political family who ruled Syria from the 1970s to 2024

=== Yemen ===
- Yahya Muhammad Hamid ed-Din – founder of the Mutawakkilite Kingdom of Yemen
- Ibrahim al-Hamadi – former president of Yemen
- Hussein Badreddin al-Houthi – Zaidi religious leader

== Rulers and military figures ==
=== Earlier ===
- Sayf al-Daula – ruler of the Hamdanid dynasty (945–967)
- Gawhar al-Siqilli – the most important military leader in the Fatimid history; led the conquest of North Africa and then of Egypt, founded the city of Cairo and the great al-Azhar mosque
- Ziri ibn Manad – founder of the Zirid dynasty in the Maghreb
- Buluggin ibn Ziri – the first ruler of the Zirids in Ifriqiya
- Al-Mansur ibn Buluggin – the second ruler of the Zirids in Ifriqiya
- Badis ibn Mansur – the third ruler of the Zirids in Ifriqiya
- Abu Zayd al-Hilali – the 11th-century Arab leader and hero of the 'Amirid tribe of Banu Hilal
- Al-Afdal Shahanshah – a vizier of the Fatimid caliphs of Egypt
- Iftikhar ad-Daula – the Fatimid governor of Jerusalem during the siege of Jerusalem
- Shawar – a ruler of Egypt, the vizier
- Hassan-i Sabbah – founded a group whose members are sometimes referred to as the Hashshashin
- Rashid ad-Din Sinan – one of the leaders of the Syrian wing of the Hashshashin sect and an important figure in the history of the Crusades

=== Azerbaijan ===
- Surat Huseynov – Azerbaijani colonel and ex-prime minister of Azerbaijan
- Eldar Mahmudov – head of the Azerbaijani Ministry of National Security
- Rail Rzayev – former head of the Azerbaijani Air Force

=== India ===
- Ali Adil Shah I of Bijapur (16th C)
- Wajid Ali Shah – last nawab of the princely kingdom of Awadh, early 19th Century
- Muhammad Quli Qutb Shah – 5th sultan of the Qutb Shahi Sultanate of Golconda
- Beram Khan 16th Century Mughal Emperor Babar.
- Ahmad shah ahmadnagar sultanate

=== Iran ===
- Ali Khamenei – marja, third president and current supreme leader of Iran
- Ruhollah Khomeini – marja, philosopher and leader of the 1979 Iranian Revolution
- Mohammad Reza Pahlavi – the last shah of Iran of the Pahlavi dynasty, ruled from 1941 until being overthrown in the Iranian Revolution resulting in the abolishment of the Iranian monarchy
- Reza Shah Pahlavi – Shah of Iran from 1925 to 1941, and father of Mohammad Reza Pahlavi
- Hassan-i Sabbah – founded a group whose members are sometimes referred to as the Hashshashin
- Allahverdi Khan – Iranian military and political leader of Georgian origin
- Imam-Quli Khan – Iranian general and statesman of Georgian origin
- Nader Shah – Shah of Iran during the Afsharid dynasty notable for his Naderian Wars, and conversion dominant belief system from Safavid ideology to Jafari fiqh
- Abbas Mirza – Qajar crown prince of Persia
- Gholamali Bayandor – first Commander of Imperial Iranian Navy
- Abbas Gharabaghi – last commander-in-chief of the Imperial Iranian Army
- Mohsen Rezaee – Chief commander of AGIR, 1981–1997
- Yahya Rahim Safavi – Chief commander of AGIR, 1997–2007
- Mohammad Ali Jafari – Chief commander of AGIR
- Ali Shamkhani – former defense minister of Iran
- Mostafa Mohammad-Najjar – current defense minister of Iran
- Ali Sayad Shirazi – chief-of-staff of the Iranian forces during Iran's eight-year war with Iraq
- Mohammad Boroujerdi – one of the founders of Islamic Revolutionary Guard Corps (AGIR) and a commander in Iran–Iraq War; played key roles in regaining control over the territories of Kurdistan by Iranian forces
- Hossein Kharrazi – Iranian commander of "Imam Hosein 14th Division" during Iran–Iraq War

=== Iraq ===
- Abdel-Karim Mahoud al-Mohammedawi – led the resistance against Saddam Hussein's government in the southern marsh regions of Iraq, where he gained the title "Prince of the Marshes"
- Hadi Al-Amiri – head of the Badr Organization, which was the military wing of the Supreme Islamic Iraqi Council
- Aras Habib – a colonel in the Free Iraqi Fighters
- Abud Qanbar – former military governor of Baghdad

=== Lebanon ===
- Adham Khanjar – Lebanese national hero
- Mohammad Zgheib – 1948 Arab–Israeli War war hero
- Hisham Jaber – former military governor of Beirut
- Imad Mughniyah – former head of Hezbollah's external security apparatus
- Sana'a Mehaidli – Lebanese martyr
- Samir Kuntar – Lebanese militant and a former member of the Palestinian Liberation Front

=== Syria ===
- Sayf al-Daula – ruler of the Hamdanid dynasty (945–967)
- Rashid ad-Din Sinan – one of the leaders of the Syrian wing of the Hashshashin sect and an important figure in the history of the Crusades
- Saleh al-Ali – commanded one of the first rebellions against the French mandate of Syria
- Salah Jadid – Syrian general and political figure in the Baath Party
- Assef Shawkat – head of the Syrian Deputy Minister of Defense, 2011–2012
- Maher al-Assad – brother of former Syrian president Bashar al-Assad; head of the Presidential Guard
- Ghazi Kanaan – Syria's interior minister, 2004–2005; long-time head of Syria's security apparatus in Lebanon
- Hisham Ikhtiyar – director of the GID, 2001–2005

=== Yemen ===
- Abdul-Malik al-Houthi – leader of Shi'a Zaidi
- Abdullah al-Ruzami – leader of Shi'a Zaidi

== Theologians ==
- Al-Shaykh al-Saduq
- Al-Shaykh Al-Mufid
- al-Sharif al-Murtada
- Muhammad ibn Ya'qub al-Kulayni
- Shaykh Tusi
- Al-Hurr al-Aamili
- Shahid Awwal
- Shahid Thani
- Qazi Nurullah Shustari (Shahid Salis)
- Shahid Rabay
- Maitham Al Bahrani – 13th-century cleric and theologian
- Al-Hilli – 13th-century cleric and theologian

== Religious figures ==
- Grand Ayatollah Muhammad Hussain Najafi - The Only Marja' In South Asia And The Most Influential Shia Personality In Pakistan.
- Agha Muhammad Reza – Iranian Shia Muslim immigrant living in the Sylhet region of Bengal. Claimed to be the Mahdi and twelfth imam, engaged in battles against the East India Company and Kachari Kingdom.
- Salih Al-Karzakani – 17th-century cleric
- Muhammad Baqir Majlisi – 17th-century cleric
- Abdullah al Samahiji – 18th-century cleric
- Yusuf Al Bahrani – 18th-century cleric
- Allamah Ibrahim el-Zakzaky – influential Shia cleric in Africa; leader of Islamic Movement in Nigeria
- Allama Syed Jawad Naqvi – Religious Leader and influential Shia Scholar in Pakistan
- Ayatollah Mahmoud Taleghani – cleric, head of the Council of Islamic revolution and founding member of the Freedom Movement of Iran
- Mohammad Baqir al-Sadr – Islamic philosopher, father of contemporary Islamic economics and founder of the Islamic Dawa Party
- Allameh Tabatabaei – one of the most prominent Islamic philosophers and, at one point, the foremost source of emulation (Marja) for Shi'a Muslims around the world
- Grand Ayatollah Sayyed Mohammad Hussein Fadlallah – foremost marja of Lebanese Shi'a Muslims
- Navvab Safavi – founder of the militant group Fadayan-e Islam
- Grand Ayatollah Ali al-Sistani – currently the pre-eminent marja of Shi'a Muslims around the world and arguably the most influential political figure in Iraq today
- Ahmad Huseinzadeh – third Sheikh ul-Islam of the Caucasus
- Grand Ayatollah Muhsin al-Hakim – sole Shi'a marja in the early 1960s
- Grand Ayatollah Abu al-Qasim al-Khoei – Shi'a marja
- Grand Ayatollah Mohammad Mohammad Sadeq al-Sadr – Shi'a marja
- Grand Ayatollah Hossein-Ali Montazeri – Shi'a marja
- Ahmed Al-Waeli – one of the most well-known Shi'a Islamic prominent clerks in the 20th century
- Aga Khan IV – imam of the Nizari Ismaili tariqah of Shia Islam
- Sa'id Akhtar Rizvi – well-known Twelver Shia scholar who promoted Shia Islam in East Africa
- Syed Ali Akhtar Rizvi – well-known Twelver Shī'ah scholar, speaker, author, historian and poet
- Allama Talib Jauhari
- Mohsin Naqvi – Urdu poet of Pakistan

== Famous Shias ==
- Rajab Bursi – Arab Shi'ite theologian and mystic
- Sayyid Baraka – spiritual teacher and friend to the 14th-century warlord Timur
- Mir Shamsuddin – Iraqi missionary.
- Shah Ni'matullah Wali – Islamic scholar and poet
- Safi-ad-din Ardabili – eponym of the Safavid dynasty
- Abba Yahiyya Ishmaili
- Baba Rexheb Albanian Bektashi

== Modern and contemporary philosophers ==
- Morteza Motahhari – Iranian cleric, philosopher and politician
- Hossein Nasr – Islamic philosopher and professor of Islamic studies at George Washington University
- Muhammad Legenhausen – modern Shi'a Muslim philosopher of German American background, PhD at Rice University

== Entertainment and media personalities ==
- Asghar Farhadi – Iranian film director and screenwriter
- Abdulhussain Abdulredha – Kuwaiti actor and writer
- Ali Haider – Pakistani singer; now Islamic singer
- Mohammad Reza Sharifinia – Iranian actor
- Zainab Bahrani – Iraqi art historian
- Shahriar Bahrani – Iranian film director
- Abbas Fahdel – Iraqi film director.
- Mir Sarwar – Indian actor.
- Mohamed Al-Daradji – Iraqi Dutch film director
- Hassan Massoudy – Iraqi calligrapher
- Ahmed Al Safi – Iraqi artist
- Nedim Kufi – Iraqi artist
- Sadequain – Pakistani artist
- Mouhamad Rachini - Canadian-Lebanese journalist
- Usama Alshaibi – Iraqi-American independent filmmaker, visual and media artist
- Jagdeep – Syed Jawahar Ali Jaffery, comedy actor in early Indian cinema
- Farida Mohammad Ali – Iraqi singer
- Naseer Shamma – Iraqi musician and oud player
- Imran Abbas Naqvi – Pakistani actor
- Sadegh Tirafkan – Iranian contemporary artist
- Khosrow Vaziri – Iranian professional wrestler, retired
- Rahat Kazmi – Pakistani actor, professional speaker and academician
- Zulfiqar Mirza – Pakistani politician
- Zain Imam – Indian television actor

== Other ==
- Edoardo Agnelli – son of Gianni Agnelli and former heir to Fiat
- Qasem Soleimani – Iranian General

== See also ==
- International rankings of Iran in science and technology
- Lists of maraji
