= Najafi (surname) =

Najafi (Arabic: نجفي; Persian: نجفی) is a surname originating from Najaf (Arabic: نجف), Iraq. Notable people with the surname include:

- Abolhassan Najafi, Iranian writer and translator
- Ayatollah Sheikh Basheer Hussain Najafi, Iraqi grand ayatollah
- Bagher Najafi, Iranian scholar
- Hafiz Riaz Hussain Najafi, Pakistani educator
- Mohammad-Ali Najafi, Iranian mathematician, politician, and murderer
- Grand Ayatollah Muhammad Hussain Najafi, Pakistani grand ayatollah
- Omid Najafi (born 1988), German politician
- Sina Najafi, American magazine editor
- Shahin Najafi, Iranian musician and political activist
- Syed Safdar Hussain Najafi, Pakistani scholar
