= Syed Safdar Hussain Najafi =

20th-century Pakistani Islamic scholar

Syed Safdar Hussain Najafi سید صفدر حسین نجفي
- Title: Muhsin-e-millat

Personal life
- Born: 1932 Alipur, Pakistan
- Died: 3 December 1989 (aged 57) Lahore, Pakistan
- Resting place: Jamea tul Muntazar, H. block, Model town, Lahore, Pakistan.
- Other names: Arabic/Persian/Urdu: سید صفدر حسین نقوى نجفی

Religious life
- Religion: Usuli Twelver Shi`a Islam

Senior posting
- Based in: Lahore, Pakistan
- Post: Muhsin-e-Millat
- Period in office: 1956–1989
- Predecessor: Principal of Jamea tul Muntazar

Syed Safdar Hussain Najafi (مولانا سید صفدر حسین نجفی) was a scholar and religious leader.

== Social background ==
=== Family and childhood ===
Najafi was born in 1932 at Alipur, a tehsil of Muzaffargarh District in the Panjab province of Pakistan. He is the son of Syed Ghulam Sarwar Naqvi from a Naqvi Syed family. He was descended from Syed Jalal-ul-Din Surkhposh Bukhari (and his grandson Jahaniyan Jahangasht is buried in the Uch), who was from a branch of the scions of Imam Ali Naqi.

=== Education in Pakistan ===
==== Secondary education ====
- Madrasa Sadeqiya, Khanpur, Rahim Yar Khan District, Maulana Allama Hussain Bakhsh Jarra (1947) commentary of the Quran.
- Madrasa in Khangarh, Maulana Ahmed Hassan, Shara Jami, Qutbi and Shara Bab e Hadi Ashar (1949).
- Madrasa Bab un Najaf in village Jarra, Dera Ismail Khan, Allama Hussain Bakhsh Jarra

=== Education in Najaf Ashraf ===
On 17 October 1951 he went to Najaf Ashraf.

==== Higher education ====
- Kifaya, Rasael and Makasib for 4 years in Najaf Ashraf.
- Dars e kharij for one year.

His mentors in Najaf Ashraf were

- Grand Ayatollah Syed Muhsin ul-Hakim,
- Grand Ayatollah Abul Qasim Khoei,
- Allama Sheikh Muhammad Ali Afghani,
- Allama Syed Abul Qasim Rashti,
- Grand Ayatollah Agha Buzurg Tehrani (who gave him the certification (Ijaza) of the Hadith).
- Sheikh Muhammad Taqi Aal e Razi
- Sheikh ul Jamea Allama Akhtar Abbas Najafi.

After 5 years in the Holy City in 1956 Allama Syed Safdar Hussain Najafi returned to his homeland Pakistan.

== Publications ==
Allama Najafi started a monthly Islamic magazine with the title of Al-Muntazar wrote 40 books on different topics and translated more than 60 books.

=== Translation into Urdu ===
- Tafseer e Namoona the commentary of the Quran written by Grand Ayatollah Naser Makarem Shirazi, 27 volumes.
- Tafseer e Mauzooee, the topical commentary of the Quran written by Grand Ayatollah Naser Makarem Shirazi, 10 volumes.
- Tazkira tul Khawaas, written by Sibt ibn e Jaozi.
- Tozih ul Masail, written by Imam Khomaini "Tozih ul Masail".
- Hukumat e Islami, written by Imam Khomaini named "Wilayat e Faqeeh". (1972)
- Tafseer e Mauzooee, the topical commentary of the Quran written by Grand Ayatollah Ja‘far Sobhani, 14, volumes .
- Ahsan ul Maqaal, written by Sheikh Abbas Qumi "Muntahi ul Aamaal".
- Intekhaab Tabari, written by Ibn e Jurair Tabari.
- Sa'ada tul Abadia, written by Sheikh Abbas Qumi.
- Nafas ul Mahmoom, written by Sheikh Abbas Qumi.
- Wilayat e Faqeeh written by Ayatollah Hussain Ali Muntazeri 4 volumes.
- Madan ul Jawahir,
- Irshad ul Quloob, written by Allama Muhammad Baqir Majlasi
- Aqaed e Imamia, written by Sheikh Muhammad Raza Muzaffar Najafi.
- Barah Imami Shia aur Ahl ul Bayt (a.s),
- Aitraaf e Haqiqat,
- Ifadiat e Mahafel o Majalis ke Awamil,
- Risala tul Mawaiz,
- Hujjat e Isna Asharia,
- Shia Isna Asharia,
- Chehel (40) Hadith, written by Syed Ali Fani.
- Al Sibtan fi Maoqef e Hima,
- Mubadiat e Hukomat e Islami,
- Al Irshad, written by Sheikh Mufid, Named Tazkara tul Athar.
- Huqooq aur Islam,
- Jahad e Akbar,
- Markae Haq o Batil,
- Yazidi Firqah,
- Manasek e Hujj,
- Kitab e Ziaraat,
- Hodood o Ta'ziraat,
- Islami Jomhoriya par Aiterazaat, Deen o Aql ki Roshni main,
- Deen e Huq Aql ki Roshni main,
- Kitab al Saqifa,
- Hamary Aimma – Seerat e Aimma, 12 small booklets.
- Irfan ul Majalis,
- etc.

== See also ==
- Profiles of Intelligence, Brig. Syed A.I. Tirmazi, SI (M) P. 278 & 280, Bookseller: Amazing Books International, Delhi, India 1995.
- The Holy Qur'ãn in South Asia, (a bio-bibliographic study of translations of the Holy Qur'ãn in 23 South Asian languages) Author: Mofakhkhar Hussain Khan, Publisher: Dhaka : Bibi Akhtar Prakãs?ani, 2001.
- The madrasa in Asia, (political activism and transnational linkages) P. 132, Author: Farish Ahmad-Noor, Yåogåindar Sikkand, Martin van Bruinessen, Publisher: Amsterdam, NL : Amsterdam University Press, ©2008.
- www.islamic-laws.com/marja/safdarhussain.htm
- Allama Syed Muhammad Yar Shah Najafi
- Allama Hussain Bakhsh Jarra
- Grand Ayatollah Muhammad Hussain Najafi
- Tehrik-e-Jafaria Pakistan (TJP)
- Allama Mufti Jafar Hussain
- Allama Syed Sajid Ali Naqvi
- Allama Arif Hussain Hussaini

== Bibliography ==
- Grand Ayatollah Bazurg Tehrani (1974–), Az-Zareeya ila Tasaaneef us-Shia (A List of Shia Books), Hawza Elmia Najaf Ashraf, Iraq.
- Aal ul Bayt Global Information Centre, Musaniffat-us-Shia (Shia Books), Aal ul Bayt Global Information Centre.
- Maulana Syed Hussain Arif Naqvi, Tazkarae Ulama e Imamia, Pakistan.
- Maulana Riaz Hussain Jafari, Mayyar-e-Mawaddat (Ayatollah Allama Syed Muhammad Yar Shah Najafi ki Majalis ka Majmoo'a), Idara Minhaj-us-Saalehin, Lahore, Pakistan.
- Maulana Riaz Hussain Jafari, tazkara-e-Mawaddat (Allama Syed Safdar Hussain Najafi ki Majalis ka Majmoo'a), Idara Minhaj-us-Saalehin, Lahore, Pakistan.
