= Muhammad Yar Shah =

Muhammad Yar Shah Naqvi Najafi (1913–1990) was a Pakistani Twelver Shia mujtahid and scholar.

== Life ==
Najafi was born in Alipur, Punjab. He completed his secondary education in 1932. After completing his secondary education, he decided to study religion.

For religious studies, Najafi went to Khanewal to study from Allamah Syed Muhammad Baqir Hindi. Later, he traveled to Najaf for higher religious education. After completing his education and receiving Ijaza e Ijtihad from many of his teachers, he came back to Pakistan. He lived in Jalalpur and then came back to his city Alipur and started a madarasa (a place for religious studies) that was known as Jamia Ilmiya Dar-ul-Huda Muhammadia. Najafi died on 20 December 1990 in Lahore, but was buried in Alipur.

== Family ==
After Ayatollah Muhammad Yar Shah Naqvi had pursued Islamic education and gained recognition as a distinguished scholar, his son, Allama Hafiz Syed Muhammad Hassnain Naqvi https://www.youtube.com/watch?v=sgIw7_2l8VM, followed in his footsteps and became an honourable and respected Islamic scholar in his own right. Continuing the family's scholarly legacy, his grandsons, Maulana Qari Syed Anees Raza Naqvi https://www.youtube.com/watch?v=XSM0mMGf61E and Maulana Syed Hussain Raza Naqvi https://www.youtube.com/watch?v=uKvr3zkfD6E, are also currently serving as scholars, further upholding the family's long-standing tradition of religious scholarship and leadership.

== Students ==
His students include:

- Syed Muhammad Safder(Chakwal)
- Hussain Bakhsh Jarra
- Muhammad Hussain Najafi (Sargodha)
- Syed Safdar Hussain Najafi (Lahore)
- Hafiz Riaz Hussain Najafi (Lahore) (son-in-law, disciple)
- Syed Sajid Ali Naqvi
- Hassan Raza Ghadeeri (London)

== See also ==
- Ayatollahs
- List of ayatollahs
- Syed Safdar Hussain Najafi
