= Hussain Bakhsh Jarra =

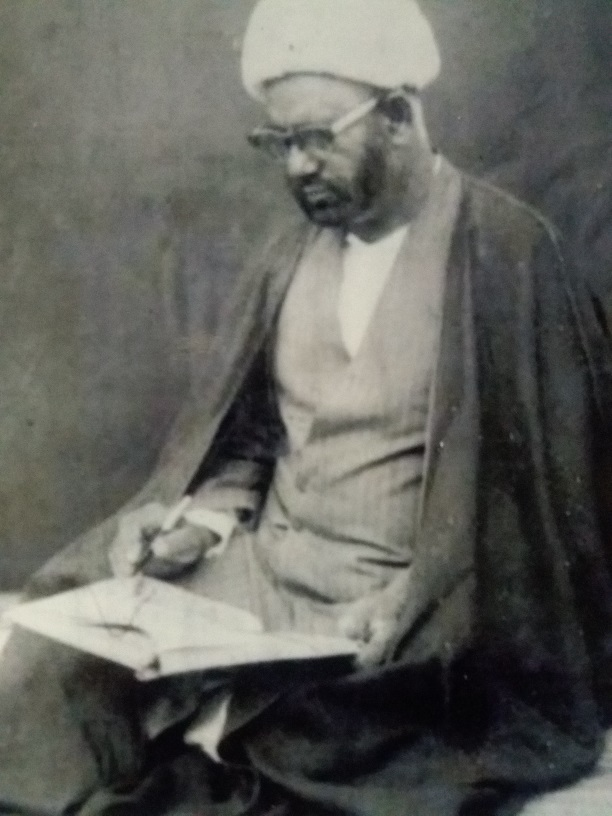
Hussein Bakhsh Jara circa 1950

Ayatollah Allama Hussain Bakhsh Jarra (5 January, 1918 – 1990) was a prominent Shia scholar from Punjab, Pakistan. He earned his degree of ijtihad from Hawza Elmiye Najaf, Iraq.

He wrote famous tafsir (exegesis) of Quran named by Anwar Najaf fi Asrar Najaf. It has 15 volumes. The 13 volumes (2 to 14) consist of exegesis of Quran from Surah Al-Fatiha to Surah Al-Nas and the First and Last volume i.e. 15 are about special features of Quranic Compilation History, Benefit of Chapters, Verses and Various other Topics.

== Prominent Students ==
1. Grand Ayatollah Muhammad Hussain Najafi
2. Allama Safdar Hussain Najafi
3. Niaz Hussain Naqvi Najafi
4. Hafiz Riaz Hussain Najafi
5. Qazi Fayyaz Hussain Naqvi

== Prominent Work ==
Tafsir Anwar Najaf fi Asrar Mushaf

== See ==
- Allama Yar Shah
- Grand Ayatollah Muhammad Hussain Najafi
- Alipur, Pakistan
