= Muhammad Hussain Najafi =

Shia Ayatollah and Marja from Pakistan (1932–2023)

Grand Ayatollah Muhammad Hussain Najafi Dhakku آيت الله العظمى محمد حسین نجفى ڈھکو
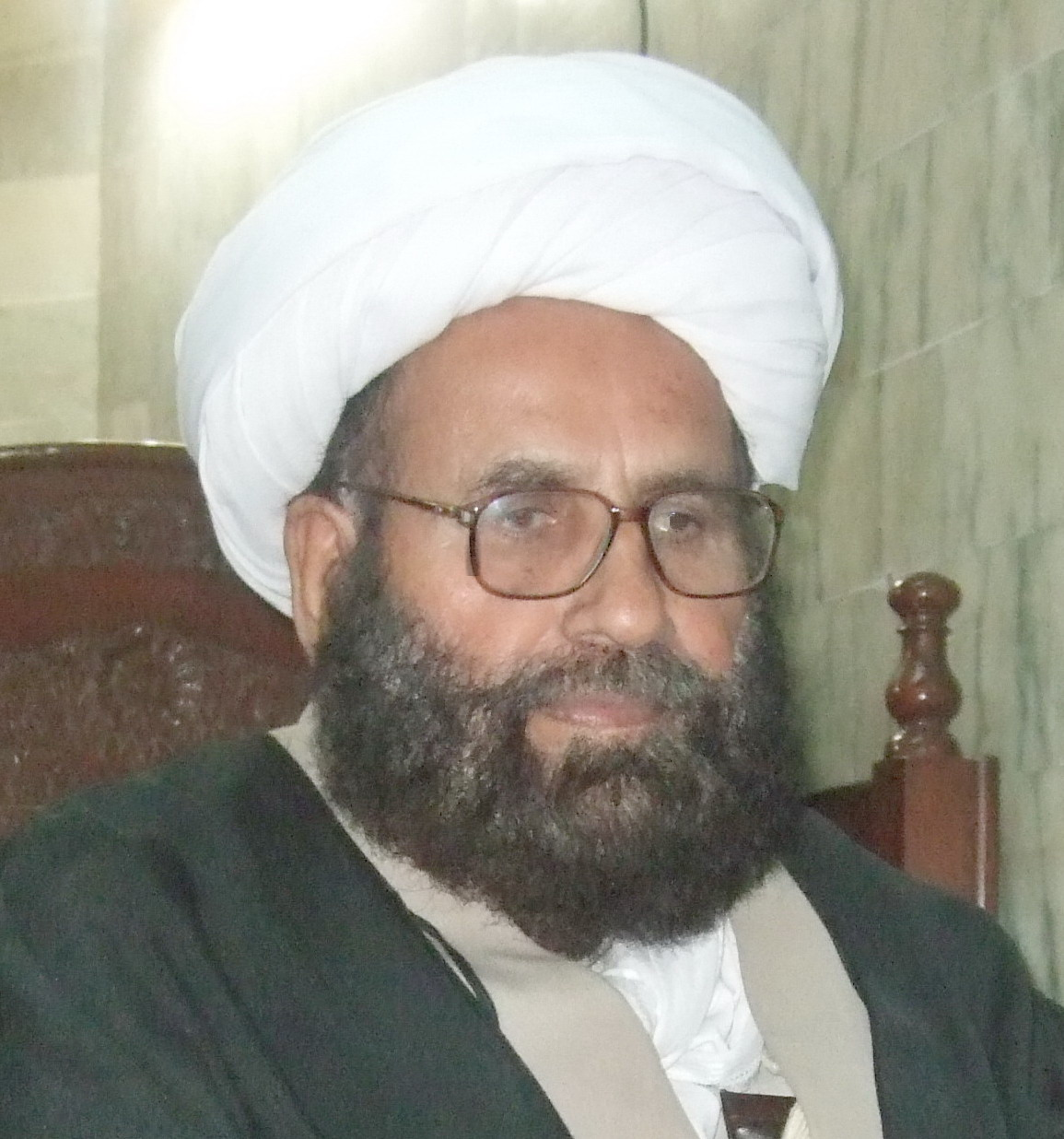
- Title: Grand Ayatollah, Ayatollah-ul-Uzma

Personal life
- Born: 10 April 1932 Jahanian Shah, Sargodha, Punjab, British India
- Died: 21 August 2023 (aged 91) Sargodha, Pakistan
- Other names: Urdu, Punjabi: محمد حسین ڈھکو
- Website: Official Website

Religious life
- Religion: Usuli Twelver Shi`a Islam

Senior posting
- Based in: Sargodha, Punjab, Pakistan
- Post: Grand Ayatollah
- Period in office: 1960–2023

Grand Ayatollah Shaikh Muhammad Hussain Najafi (Arabic: آيت الله العظمى علامه شيخ محمد حسين; 10 April 1932 – 21 August 2023) was a Pakistani Twelver Shia Marja. Muhammad Hussain Najafi was running a Hawza in Sargodha. Najafi was included in all the editions of "The Muslim 500: The World's Most Influential Muslims" since 2010. He is one of the nine marja's mentioned in the most recent edition.

== Childhood and family ==
Muhammad Hussain was born in small town of Jehania shah in Sargodha District of Punjab province of Pakistan in April 1932. He had two paternal uncles, both of whom were Shia ulema: Maulana Imam Bakhsh was a religious teacher in Jahanian Shah, while Maulana Sohrab Ali Khan was a reputed alim of Uch Sharif. His father Rana Tajuddin was not an alim, but he had the wish of making his son a great alim. However, he died in 1944 when Muhammad Hussain was 12 years old, after which the family members persuaded the widow that Muhammad Hussain should look after the family lands, but she kept up the wish of her dead husband.

== Early education in Pakistan ==
After secondary school education, he got an admission in Madrasah Muhammadia in Jalalpur Nankiana, Sargodha, where one of his prominent teachers was Ayatollah Allama Hussain Bakhsh Jarra. In 1947, he studied the courses of Dars-i-Nizami from Ayatollah Allama Muhammad Baqir Naqvi in Jhang. Allama Baqir Naqvi had migrated from Iraq to spread Shia formal education in Pakistan. Since (the first prominent Shia scholar in Pakistan Ustad ul ulama) Grand Ayatollah Allama Syed Muhammad Yar Shah Naqvi Najfi, the most prominent disciple of Allama Baqir Naqvi, had moved from his ancestral city Alipur to Jalalpur, Muhammad Hussain moved to Jalalpur to complete Dars-i-Nizami for the next five years. In 1953, he passed the examination of Molvi Fazil from Punjab University, and moved to Najaf in 1954 for higher education.

== Marital life ==
Before going to Najaf for higher religious education, he was married to his maternal cousin in 1952. His teacher Allama Yar Shah had links with ulema of Najaf, and he wanted Muhammad Hussain to get married in a scholarly family of Najaf, but Muhammad Hussain declined this proposal due to cultural differences.

In 1954, his only son Muhammad Sibtayn was born. At the age of five, he got seriously ill and died, as Muhammad Hussain did not have enough money for his treatment. (Muhammad Hussain used to spend his stipend money on household and buying books.) After Sibtayn's death, Ayatollah Najafi did not have children for the next eleven years, later he had one daughter. He married the daughter of Haji Muhammad Shafi (Faisalabad) in 1970. He had two daughters from this marriage. His first wife died in 1996.

== Education at Hawza Elmiye Najaf ==
Hawza Elmiye Qom's Team interviewing Ayatollah Najafi.

Ayatollah Najafi leading prayers after interview with Hawza's Team.

In 1954, he moved to Hawza Elmiye Najaf to finalize his religious education . He attended the lectures of the following marjas:

1. Grand Ayatollah Mohsin Al-Hakim for dars-e-kharij of Fiqh
2. Grand Ayatollah Sayyed Javad Tabrizi for dars-e-kharij of Kifaya-tul-Usool
3. Grand Ayatollah Meerza Baqir Zanjani for dars-e-kharij of Usool-e-Fiqh
4. Grand Ayatollah Bazurg Tehrani for Fehm-e-Hadees-o-Rajjal & Kutb Shanasi
5. Grand Ayatollah Mahmood Shahroudi for dars-e-kharij of Fiqh
6. Grand Ayatollah Abdul Aala Sabzwari for dars-e-kharij of Fiqh
7. Grand Ayatollah Abul Qasim Rashti for Rasail-o-Makatib
8. Grand Ayatollah Abdul Hussain Amini (the writer of famous Al-Ghadeer) for Ilm-e-Munazira
9. Grand Ayatollah Mulla Sadra for Satheeyat & Asfar
10. Grand Ayatollah Aqae Muhaqqiq for Darse Manzooma Sabzwari
11. Grand Ayatollah Aqae Fazel for Ilm-e-Kalam
12. Grand Ayatollah Abdul Karim Zanjani for Tanawwo dar Islami Uloom-o-Funoon and Ittehad-e-Islami

In an interview to the Hawza Elmiye Qom's monthly magazine "Hawza", he was asked:

Hawza Team: Hazrat, tell us about your education at Hawza Elmiye Najaf and your teachers there.
Ustad Najafi: My stay at Najaf was short ... I completed my education in 6 years ... At Najaf, the total number of courses I used to study and teach daily often reached up to ten. ... Once my teacher Grand Ayatollah Shaikh Jawad Tabrizi said to me in light mood:

"Why do you take so much strain, what is the logic in taking ten courses daily? Iranians say: 'The climate of Najaf is dry, thus taking one course in Najaf is not enough, but taking two courses is more than enough.'"

He wrote the following books during his stay at Najaf:

1. Isbat ul-Imamat
2. Tahqeeqat ul-Fariqain fi Hadis as-Saqlain
3. Iqd ul-Juma'n (Translation of Mafatih al-Janan)
4. A'dab ul-Mufeed wal Mustafeed (Translation of Munia tul-Murid)
5. Faiz ur-Rehman (Translation of Lu'lu wal Marjan)

Grand Ayatollah Bazurg Tehrani has mentioned these books in his famous book Az-Zariya ila Tasaneef ush-Shia (A list of Shia Books), and Aalulbayt Global information Center has mentioned these books in their Musannifat-ush-Shia (Shia Books). Najafi was fluent in Arabic, Persian, Punjabi and Urdu languages.

== Ijtihad and Marjiyyat ==
Najafi received ijazah's of ijtihad from following marjas of Hawza Elmiye Najaf, in 1960 AD (1379 AH):

1. Imam Ruhollah Khomeini
2. Grand Ayatollah Mohsin Al-Hakim
3. Grand Ayatollah Sayyed Javad Tabrizi
4. Grand Ayatollah Mara'shi Najafi
5. Grand Ayatollah Meerza Baqir Zanjani
6. Grand Ayatollah Bazurg Tehrani
7. Grand Ayatollah Mahmood Shahroudi
8. Grand Ayatollah Abdul Aala Sabzwari
9. Grand Ayatollah Abul Qasim Rashti
10. Grand Ayatollah Abdul Karim Zanjani
11. Grand Ayatollah Najam ud-Din ash-Sharif as-Samarrai
12. Grand Ayatollah Muhammad Raza al-Musavi
13. Grand Ayatollah Muhammad Mahdi al-Kazmaini
14. Grand Ayatollah Ahmed al-Mustanbit

He published his Tawzih ul Masail (treatise) named "Qawaneen ush-Sharia fi Fiqh-e-Jafariya" in 1980 AD (1400 AH). He was being followed by a number of Shia Muslims in matters of fiqh from Pakistan and abroad.

== Clerical activities in Pakistan ==
Addressing ulema and students at Madrasah Imam Ali Qom (May 2004).

=== Principal of Dar-ul-Uloom Muhammadia ===
After returning to Pakistan in 1960, Pir Fazal Shah (Parhezgar) asked him to become the principal of Dar-ul-Uloom Muhammadia, Sargodha, which he eagerly accepted.
In 1971, due to increased involvement in Majlis and Shia political movements it became impossible for him to run the affairs of Dar-ul-Uloom Muhammadia, therefore he stepped down from this post.

=== Participation in Shia educational affairs ===
In 1963, the principals of Shia madrasahs from all over Pakistan gathered in Karbala Gamey Shah, Lahore, and founded Tanzeeme Madarise Arabia Shia Pakistan (Organization of Shia Madrasahs of Pakistan). Ayatollah Najafi was elected its president.

In 1965, a high-level organization of Shia ulema Mautamar Ulemae Shia Pakistan (Conference of Shia Ulema of Pakistan) was formed with Ayatollah Najafi as its president. and Mufti Jafar Hussain as its patron. Other members included Allama Gulab Ali Shah, Allama Akhtar Abbas, Allama Hussain Bakhsh Jarra, Hafiz Saifullah Jafari, Allama Syed Safdar Hussain Najafi, Mufti Inayat Ali Shah, Allama Muhib Hussain, Allama Riaz Hussain Najafi and Allama Ghulam Hassan Jarra.

=== Participation in Shia politics ===
In 1964, Ayatollah Muhammad Hussain Najafi played a pivotal role in gathering about 250 Shia ulema and leaders in Imam Bargah Rizvia, Karachi, where "Shia Mutalbat Committee" was formed with Syed Muhammad Dehlavi as its president.

In 1978, after Zia ul Haq's announcement of promulgating Hanafi fiqh, Shia ulema and leaders gathered in Bhakkar and founded Tehrik-e-Nifaz-e-Fiqh-e-Jafaria (later called Tehrik-e-Jafaria Pakistan) with Mufti Jafar Hussain as its president. Ayatollah Najafi was a part of this organization's supreme council. In 1980, Shias protested in Islamabad against the forced collection of money by Zia on the name of Zakat. It was Ayatollah Najafi Who held talks with the regime and because of his extra-ordinary debating abilities Shias were exempted from this law. After Mufti Jafar's demise, it was upon Ayatollah Najafi's recommendation that Allama Arif Hussain Hussaini was elected the new president of the organization. No Doubt, Ayatollah Najafi was the most powerful support for all of the Shia Political Leaders (Presidents Shia Ulmaa Council). He was the one from whose efforts Shias of Pakistan got their first official Political Supreme Leader and he supported them all till his last breath.

=== Jamia Sultan ul-Madaris ===
Meeting Grand Ayatollah Naser Makarem Shirazi (May 2004).

In 1978, Raja Mumtaz Ali Khan gifted 3-acre (12,000 m^{2}) land to Ayatollah Najafi for madrasah, on which Jamia Ilmia Sultan ul-Madaris al-Islamia was constructed.

In 2004, he founded Jamia Aqeela bani Hashim for the religious education of women.

He was also the patron of the following madrasahs:

1. Madrasah Muhammadia, Sargodha
2. Madrasah Ahya ul-Uloom Haideria, Mandi Bahauddin
3. Madrasah Baqir ul-Uloom, Bhakkar
4. Madrasah Wali ul-Asr, Jhang
5. Madrasah Hazrat Amir ul-Momineen, Layyah
6. Madrasah Jamia tul-Qaim, Layyah
7. Madrasah Jafaria, Uch Sharif
8. Madrasah Bab ul-Hussain, Dera Ismail Khan

=== Burning of library ===
After the publication of "Tajalliat-e-Sadaqat", which was written in response to the anti-Shia book "Aftab-e-Hidayat", his family library was set ablaze by followers of the sunni sect in Muharram 1983. He was in Quetta for reciting Majlis of Muharram.

=== Participation in 17th Islamic Unity Conference, Tehran ===
Meeting Grand Ayatollah Hossein Noori Hamedani (May 2004).

On the invitation of the Iranian Supreme Leader Grand Ayatollah Ali Khamenei, he attended the 17th Islamic Unity Conference in Tehran, Iran in May 2004.

Najafi also visited Hawza Elmiye Qom, where he had meetings with Ayatollah Morteza Moghtadai, Grand Ayatollah Hossein Noori Hamedani and Grand Ayatollah Naser Makarem Shirazi. He was interviewed by the state television and the Hawza Elmiye Qom's official magazine Hawza.

=== Participation in 21st Islamic Unity Conference, Tehran ===
On the invitation of the Iranian Supreme Leader Grand Ayatollah Ali Khamenei, he attended the 21st Islamic Unity Conference in Tehran, Iran in May 2008, along with Allama Sajid Naqvi, Shaikh Mohsin Najafi, Hafiz Riaz Hussain Najafi and Maulana Sami ul Haq.

Najafi also visited Hawza Elmiye Qom, where he had meetings with Ayatollah Jafar Subhani, Grand Ayatollah Mohammad Shahroudi, Grand Ayatollah Mousa Shubairi Zanjani, Grand Ayatollah Qorban Ali Kaboli, Ayatollah Ahmed Mobalighi and Grand Ayatollah Naser Makarem Shirazi. He also addressed a gathering arranged in memory of Shaikh Aktar Abbas Najafi and Shaheed Ghulam Hussain Najafi in Madrasah Hojatieh, Hawza Elmiye Qom.

== Majalis and Q&A sessions ==
Addressing Muharram majlis in Multan (2009)

In the later years of his life, he addressed Majlis in almost all parts of Punjab, Pakistan. He also addressed Majlis in Imambargah Shah Gardez, Multan where all the major Shia ulema address majalis before him, including Allama Akhter Abbas Naseem, Principal of Madrasah Jamia tus-Saqlain, Multan. The famous Ayatollah Syed Aqeel-ul-Gharavi also addressed majalis at the same place.

Najafi also addressed post-Muharram Majlis in Islamabad and Birmingham, England for many years.

After his Majlis, questions pertaining to fiqh, aqaid and tafsir were put before him from the gathering. He gave answers to these questions with references from Quran and Hadith of The Fourteen Infallibles. At certain occasions, these Q&A sessions spanned hours.

== Death ==
Grand Ayatullah Muhammad Hussain Najafi died on 21 August 2023, around 7 A.M in morning at the age of 91 in Quaid E Azam International Hospital, Islamabad. Approximately 100,000 people attended his funeral prayer, which was performed in his seminary Jamia Ilmiya Sultan Ul Madaris, Sargodha and led by Maulana Syed Taqi Shah Naqvi. All senior Islamic scholars from all over the Pakistan participated. Due to the extreme number of devotees, many people were not able to perform Namaz E Janazah (As the vast ground was full and entrance was blocked). On assistance of those momineens who were not able to perform Janazah, two additional Namaz E Janazah were performed so that the remaining ones could also pay their last tribute to their Marja E Taqleed. Marjas/Grand Ayatullahs from all over the world sent Letters of condolence and arranged Majlis E Tarheem and recitation of Holy Quran for the only Marja' of South Asia, Ayatullah Muhammad Hussain Najafi. He is buried in his Seminary Jamia Sultan Ul Madaris, Zahid Colony, Sargodha.

== Books ==
- Faizan ur-Rahman fi Tafsir ul-Quran

It is a 10-volume comprehensive Tafsir of Quran.

- Masail ush-Sharia (Translation of Wasael ush-Shia)

It is the Urdu translation of the great Shia book of Hadith Wasael ush-Shia by Shaikh al-Hur al-Aamili. 13 volumes out of 20 have been published.

- Kawakib-e-Muzayya (Translation of Al-Jawahar as-Sunnia fil-Ahadees-al-Qudsia)

It is the Urdu translation & explanation of Shaikh al-Hur al-Aamili's book on Hadith Qudsi.

- Ahsan ul-Fawaid fi Sharh al-Aqaid

It is a 2-volume Urdu translation & explanation of Sheikh Saduq's famous Risala "Al-Aqaid". It contains all the Shia beliefs, and their truthfulness in the light of Quran and Hadith.

- Usool ush-Sharia fi Aqaid ush-Shia

This book discusses the beliefs of Ghali's, Tafwizi's and Shaykhi's (which they have spread in the name of Shia Islam), and negates them in the light of Quran and Hadith.

- Aitaqadat-e-Imamia

It is the Urdu translation & explanation of Allama Majlisi's "Risala tul-Lailia".

- Aqsam-e-Tauheed
- Mukhtasir Aqaid ush-Shia
- Qawaneen ush-Sharia fi Fiqh-e-Jafariya (Tawzih ul-Masail)

It is a 2-volume fiqhi book, covering all the aspects of human life according to Jafari Jurisprudence, including the modern human issues.

- Khulasa tul-Ahkam

It is an abridged version of Qawaneen ush-Sharia.

- Hurmat-e-Ghina Aur Islam

This book discusses the hurmat of ghina in Islamic Sharia.

- Hurmat-e-Reeshtarashi

This book discusses the hurmat of shaving beard in Islamic Sharia.

- Namaz-e-Juma Aur Islam

It is a book which attempts to prove that Juma Prayers are wajib even in Imam Mahdi's Ghaibat. It was published by Syed Muhammad Dehlavi in Karachi.

- Iqd ul-Juma'n (Translation of Mafatih al-Janan)

Ayatollah Najafi translated Mafatih al-Janan during his stay at Najaf, but did not publish it as another translation was published from Lahore.
Grand Ayatollah Bazurg Tehrani has mentioned it in his famous book "Az-Zariya ila Tasaneef ush-Shia" (A list of Shia Books), and Grand Ayatollah Hussaini in his book "Ziyarat".

- Zaad-ul-Ibad li-youmil-Ma'ad

It is a collection of supplications from reliable Shia books.

- Saadat ud-Darain fi Maqtal al-Hussain

It is a comprehensive account of the Battle of Karbala in 61 AH and the tragic martyrdom of Husayn ibn Ali, all narrated from reliable sources only.

- Faiz ur-Rehman (Translation of Lu'lu wal Marjan)

Ayatollah Najafi translated Allama Noori's famous book Lu'lu wal Marjan during his stay at Najaf, but did not publish it as another translation "Jawahir ul-Bayan" was published from Sargodha.
Grand Ayatollah Bazurg Tehrani has mentioned it in his famous book "Az-Zariya ila Tasaneef ush-Shia" (A list of Shia Books), and has written that its foreword about hurmat of ghina is indeed useful.

- Shuhda-e-Khamsa kay Haalat-e-Zindagi

It contains biographies of the five martyr Shia ulema:

1. Shaheed-e-Awal Muhammad Jamal uddin Makki Amili
2. Shaheed-e-Sani Zain uddin Amili
3. Shaheed-e-Salis Qazi Nurullah Shustari
4. Shaheed-e-Rabey Mirza Muhammad Kamil Dehlavi
5. Shaheed-e-Khamis Mohammad Baqir al-Sadr
- Isbat ul-Imamat

It is a book on the issue of Khilafat & Imamat, and establishes that Imam Ali was the true successor to Muhammad.
Grand Ayatollah Bazurg Tehrani has mentioned it in his famous book "Az-Zariya ila Tasaneef ush-Shia" (A list of Shia Books).

- Tahqeeqat ul-Fariqain fi Hadis as-Saqlain

It is a book presenting extensive research from both the Shia & Sunni books of Hadith, as regards the truthfulness of Hadith of the two weighty things (Hadis as-Saqlain).
Grand Ayatollah Bazurg Tehrani has mentioned it in his famous book "Az-Zariya ila Tasaneef ush-Shia" (A list of Shia Books).

- Tajalliat-e-Sadaqat fi Jawab Aftab-e-Hidayat

It is a 2-volume book in response to the anti-Shia book "Aftab-e-Hidayat" by Maulvi Karam Deen.

- Tanzeeh ul-Imamia amma fi Risala Mazhab ush-Sha

It is the book in response to the anti-Shia risala "Mazhab ush-Shia" by Pir Siyyalvi.

- Khatm-e-Nabuwwat bar Khatmi Martabat

This book attempts to prove Khatme Nabuwwat (i.e. Prophethood has come to an end after Muhammad.)

- A'dab ul-Mufeed wal Mustafeed (Translation of Munia tul-Murid)

Ayatollah Najafi translated Shaheed-e-Sani's famous book Munia tul-Murid during his stay at Najaf, but did not publish it as another translation by Mufti Inayat Ali Shah was published.
Grand Ayatollah Bazurg Tehrani has mentioned it in his famous book "Az-Zariya ila Tasaneef ush-Shia" (A list of Shia Books).

- Islah ul-Majalis wal-Mahafil

This book discusses the wrong customs associated with Majlis of Imam Hussain, and how to correct them.

- Islah ur-Rusoom az-Zahira ba Kalam al-Itrat at-Tahira

It is a comprehensive book discussing all the bid‘ah's and perceived false customs in Islamic society, and how to correct them.

== See also ==
- Hawza
- List of ayatollahs
- List of maraji
- List of Shi'a books
- List of Shi'a Muslim scholars of Islam
- Marjas
- Muhsin al-Hakim
- Mirza Javad Tabrizi
- Resalah
- Five Martyrs of Shia Islam
- The Four Books
- Wasā'il al-Shīʿa

== Bibliography ==
- Grand Aytollah Bazurg Tehrani (1974), Az-zareeya ila Tasaneef ush-Shia (A List of Shia Books), Hawza Elmiye Najaf, Iraq
- Aalulbayt Global Information Centre, Musaniffat-ush-Shia (Shia Books), Aalulbayt Global Information Centre
- Hojatol Islam Tahir Abbas Qomi (2006), Mard-e-Ilm Medan-e-Amal Mein, Jamia Wali-ul-Asr (Layyah, Pakistan)
- Maulana Syed Hussain Arif Naqvi, Tazkarae Ulemae Imamia Pakistan
- Maulana Riaz Hussain Jafari, Mayyar-e-Mawaddat (Ayatollah Allama Syed Muhammad Yar Shah Najafi ki Majalis ka Majmoo'a), Idara Minhas-us-Salehin (Lahore, Pakistan)
