= Wasa'il al-Shia =

Book by Al-Hurr al-Aamili

Wasa'il al-Shia وَسَائِل ٱلشِّيعَة
- The front cover of "Wasa'il al-Shia"
- Author: Shaikh al-Hur al-Aamili
- Language: Arabic
- Media type: Book

Wasa'il al-Shia (Arabic: وَسَائِل ٱلشِّيعَة, Wasāʾil al-Shīʿa lit. Means of Shiite or Shiite Rituals) is a reputable book of hadith in Shia Islam, compiled in the 17th century by Shaykh al-Hurr al-Amili. Shaykh Al-Hurr wrote two editions of this book, Ahl al-Bayt which is a 30 volume long edition of it, and Al-Islamiyyah which is 20 volumes long.

== Author ==
Wasa'il al-Shia was authored by Al-Hurr al-Aamili and based on The Four Books (Kitab al-Kafi, Man La Yahduruhu al-Faqih, Al-Istibsar, Tahdhib al-Ahkam) and other major Shia sources. Ḥurr al-ʿĀmilīy was born Muḥammad ibn Ḥasan ibn ʿAlīy Mašḡarīy in the village of al-Mašḡarah, in Jabal ʿĀmil, present day southern Lebanon. He was one of the dominant Shia Hadith scholars. His other works were al-Jawāhir al-Sanīyah fī al-Aḥādīth al-Qudsīyah, that was the first source collected of divine Hadiths known as Hadith Qudsi, And Ithbāt al-Hudāt bil-Nuṣūṣ wal-Muʿjizāt, which is about Imamah.

== Context ==
Wasa'il al-Shia as a multi-volume Hadith collection was accomplished by Al-Ḥurr Al-ʿĀmili after twenty years in 1677 at Tus. The main context of this book is referred to Islamic jurisprudence

Book Wasa'il al-Shia is one of the most comprehensive books of Shia narrations. This book contains approximately 36,000 reports about religious orders, obligations, and prohibitions. The narrations are taken from previous reliable Shia hadith collections from the Prophet, his companions and Ahl al-Bayt.

== Commentaries & Translations ==
1. The author himself started writing commentary Tahreer Wasael ush-Shia of the book, and one volume was publicized.
2. Shaikh Muhammad Razi Qazvini wrote a shar'ah.
3. Shaikh Muhammad Suleman Muqabi wrote a shar'ah named Majma ul-Ahkam
4. Grand Ayatollah Muhammad Hussain Najafi Usuli translated the book into Urdu, named Masael ush-Sharia.
5. English Translation (online): https://wasail-al-shia.net

== Value and Credibility ==
Writing the Wasa'il al-Shia has been of interest to scholars and Shiite authorities. At this time, the main elements of the interpretation of religious orders and seminaries of Shia Ijtihad are considered in all lessons of Fiqh validity and is quoted and cited."

Between 11th-17th centuries many Hadith's collection was prepared that the most famous of them were Bihar al-Anwar by Allama Majlisi, Wasa'il al-Shia by Al-Hurr al-Aamili and al-Safi fi Tafsir Kalam Allah al-Wafi by Mohsen Fayz Kashani.

== See also ==
- Shia Islam
- List of Shia books
- Shaikh al-Hur al-Aamili
