= Syed Muhammad Dehlavi =

Pakistani Shia scholar

Ayatollah Allama Syed Muhammad Dehlavi was a Shia scholar from Pakistan, who was elected as the first president of Shiite Demands Committee (a Shia Organization founded by the efforts of Muhammad Hussain Najafi and other scholars) later called Tehrik-e-Nifaz-e-Fiqh-e-Jafaria (later called Tehrik-e-Jafaria Pakistan). He had authored his fiqhi resalah named Wasael-ush-Sharia in Urdu, and the famous Urdu book Tohfat-ul-Awam on Jafari fiqh was largely based on it.
