= Iraj Malekpour =

Iranian physicist

Iraj Malekpour (ایرج ملکپور) is an born Amol Iranian university professor of space physics.

He was famous in Iran for writing and preparing the annual calendar that was officially used in Iran until 2002.

He holds an adjunct faculty position at Tehran University, and works at the Tehran University's Institute of Geophysics.

He holds a PhD from France.

It has been said that he has been purged from the university faculty recently.
