= Syed Aqeel-ul-Gharavi =

Islamic scholar, educator and philosopher

Syed Aqeel-ul-Gharavi سید عقیل الغروی
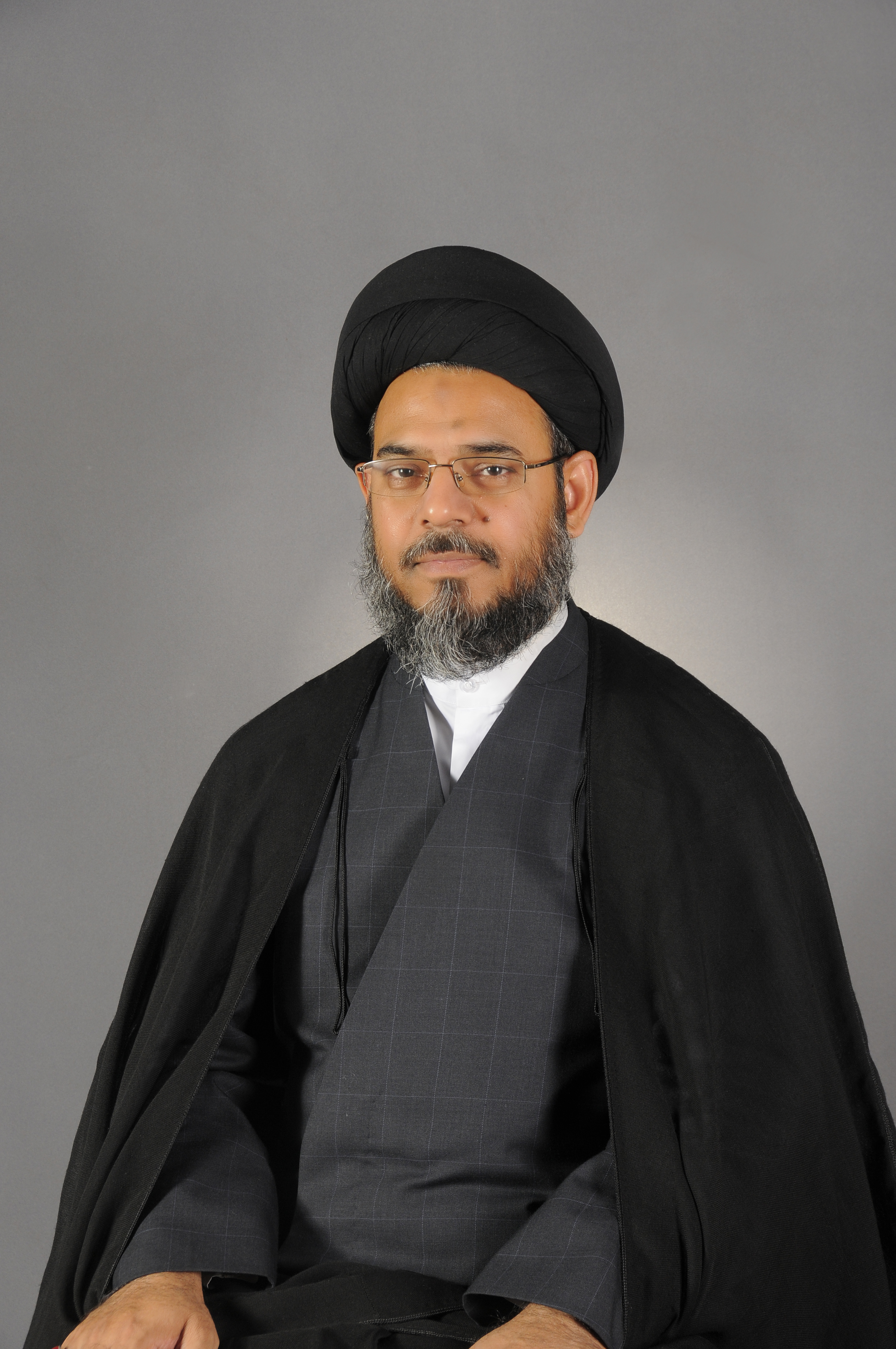
- Gharavi in 2026
- Title: Ayatullah, Syed-ul-ulama, Allama, Maulana

Personal life
- Born: 2 February 1964 (age 62) Varanasi, Uttar Pradesh, India
- Children: Syed Sajjad Gharavi (son)
- Parent: Syed Sibte Hassan Rizvi (father)
- Notable work(s): Naya Taleemi Tajreba, Angbeen, Chiragh e Raah etc.
- Other name: Syed Ghulam Mohammad Qaim Rizvi (Birth name)
- Pen name: Aqeel (Urdu:عقیلؔ)
- Website: www.algharavi.org

Religious life
- Religion: Shia Islam

Senior posting
- Based in: London, UK
- Post: Ayatollah

Aqeel-ul-Gharavi also known as Ayatullah Aqeel-ul-Gharavi (Arabic: آيت الله السيد عقيل الغروى; born 2 February 1964) is a leading Indian Twelver Shia scholar, writer, and a mujtahid.

He is described as a senior Shia scholar from the Indian subcontinent. He was the principal of Hawza-e-Ilmia Jamia-tus-Saqalain, Delhi and is the chairman of Safinatul Hidaya Trust, India. He is the vice-President of All India Muslim Majlis-e-Mushawarat and member of All India Muslim Personal Law Board. He is patron of Imamia Islamic University, Delhi and secretary of Forum of Philosophers, India.

Allama Aqeel ul Gharavi is the representative of Majma Taghrib by Ayatullah Sheikh Mohsen Araki for the Indian sub-continent.

He is the supervisor of monthly published magazine Adabi Kainat. Adabi Kainat was founded in 1971, and is published in Urdu.

== Biography ==
=== Early life and education ===
Syed Aqeel Gharavi was born in Banaras, India, in 1964 but his whole family migrated to Najaf when he was very young. In Najaf, he got his primary education and after some years he went to India where he completed his secondary education from a college in Banaras. Later, he graduated from Jamia Millia Islamia University in Delhi. After completing his graduation, he decided to study religion in Qom despite his interest in medical sciences. In Qom he studied under many teachers. Moreover, he also went to the seminary of Mashhad, where he studied for several years.

=== Ijtihad ===
In 1994, he got ijazah (permission) for ijtihad from Grand Ayatollah Naser Makarem Shirazi and from then, he became a mujtahid.

=== Teachers ===
Some of his teachers are:

- Fazel Lankarani
- Hossein Mazaheri
- Naser Makarem Shirazi
- Syed Izzudin Husseini Zanajni
- Syed Ali Naqi Naqvi Naqqan
- Hassan Hassanzadeh Amoli
- Taqi falsafi
- Mohsin Araki
- Syed Muhammad Jawad Tehrani
- Ali Movahed Abtahi
- Syed Muhammad Hussaini Tehrani

=== Return to India ===
After that he came back to India. During his stay in India, he became principal of Hawza e Ilmiya Jamia tus Saqlain, Delhi. From more than three decades, he has been addressing lectures and majalis in different countries. Through his speeches, he has revived the old Lucknowi style of reciting majalis of different scholars such as Syed Ali Naqi Naqvi. Famous Urdu poet Baqir Zaidi, in one of his Marsiya pays tribute to Ayatollah Aqeel ul Gharavi by mentioning his unique style of reciting majalis and his superiority over other orators like this:

یوں تو منبر پر بہت فیض رساں ملتے ہیں

علم و دانش کے بڑے کوہِ گراں ملتے ہیں

ایک سے ایک خطیبوں کے بیاں ملتے ہیں

فکر سے علم نکالیں وہ کہاں ملتے ہیں

اس بلندی پہ نظر ایک وہی آتے ہیں

چشمِ بدور عقیلؔ الغروی آتے ہیں

(باقرؔ زیدی)

=== Residence ===
Aqeel ul Gharavi currently resides in London and addresses Majalis-e-Aza at Babul Murad Centre and Masjid-e-Ali (AS).

== Majalis and seminars ==
=== Lectures and Seminars ===
Syed Aqeel-ul-Gharavi has addressed hundreds of seminars in Pakistan, India and other countries on different topics. Some of the seminars are listed below:

- Unified Syllabus, Varanasi, India - Dec 1983 - Presided by the VC Dr. Iqbal Narain. International Seminar on the same theme in Delhi - 1988.
- A three-day International seminar on Imam Khomeini.
- Seminar on Educational Theory of Abul Kalaam Azad - April 1988.
- International seminar on Nahjul Balagha. Ayatullah Hashemi Rafsanjani also attended this seminar - 1989.
- International Seminar on Mulla Sadra at Jamia Millia Islamia in collaboration with the Ministry of Irshaad (Moral Guidance) - Delhi - 1992
- Symposium on Imam Ali (as) presided by Dr. S.D Sharma, former president of India.
- Presidential address at Fatimyah college - 2007
- Lecture at Fatimyah College - March 2008
- Seminar on the topic of Knowledge and ways of its acquisition - Karachi - 2010
- Seminar on Critical study of spiritual poetry - Karachi - 2010
- Relationship between knowledge and values - Seminar - Karachi - 2011
- Seminar on Basic values of Spiritual Civilization - Held by Arts council of Pakistan, Karachi - 2012
- Disocrd among Ummah - conspiracies and remedies - 2013
- Seminar on ideology of Governance in Islam - Karachi - 2014
- Quranic Sciences - Brief history and basic concepts - Presided by Khawaja Ithna Ashari jamat, Karachi - 2015
- Lecture at JSO Organization Lahore Division - Lahore - 2015
- Effects of Karbala on Urdu Literature - Seminar - Held by Urdu Markaz International - 2016
- Presidential address at the 25th Hussain Day - Banglore, India - 2017
- International Seminar on Late prof. Nayyar Masood - Lucknow - 2017 - Conducted by Dr. Abbas Raza Nayyarِ
- 14 lectures based on Ilm-e-Akhlaq - London - 2018
- Lecture at Shrine of Imam Hussain - Karbala - Held by Sheikh Mehdi Karbalai - 2019
- International conference on Imam Ali (a.s) - New Delhi - 2019 - Organised by Safinatul Hidaya Trust

=== Majalis in Pakistan and foreign countries ===
Syed Aqeel-ul-Gharavi has addressed thousands of majalis in different parts of the world. Following is a list containing some of his majalis addressed in Pakistan and other countries:

- From 1999 to 2015, Syed Aqeel-ul-Gharavi has addressed to majalis in Pakistan. It included different cities like Lahore, Hyderabad, Multan, Karachi, Rawalpindi and Islamabad etc.
- In Karachi, he addressed 10 majalis in 1999 at Imambarghah Shah-e-Shaheedan (Residence of Late Syed Ali Muttaqi Jafri) on the topic of "Asma-ul-Husna". Since then whenever he come to Pakistan, he addresses Muharram majalis in this Imambargah. He has also addressed majalis in other places like Imambargah Babulilm, Imambargah Madinatul ilm Imambargah Shah e Najaf etc. in Karachi.
- In Lahore, he addressed five majalis in 2003 at 6-B, Model Town. Since then, he has been coming to Lahore and addressing at various venues from 2003-2015 specially at 6-B, Model Town, "Imam Bargah Gulistan-e-Zahra (sa)" at Abbot Road, Aza Khana e Zahra (30-K, Model Town), Jamia Masjid Sahib uz Zaman etc. on different topics like theology, philosophy, science & Islam.
- In 2007, Allama Syed Aqeel-ul-Gharavi extended his visit to Multan. He addressed two majalis at "Imambargah Haideria", Gulghast Colony and one at Mumtazabad. Allama Aqeel-ul-Gharavi has also addressed majalis in Kuwait.
- In 2009, Syed Aqeel-ul-Gharavi addressed majalis in Sargodha, Punjab, Pakistan at Dar ul uloom Muhammadia ( دارالعلوم محمدیہ ) on 1 and 2 February 2009 on the topic Ramz-e-Quran.
- In 2009, he went to Rawalpindi and addressed five days majalis on the topic of "Imam e Zamana (as)".
- In 2010, Aqeel-ul-Gharavi addressed majalis in Hyderabad, Sindh at Ali palace, Qasimabad.
- From 2011 to 2015, he addressed majalis in the same cities (that are mentioned above) at different venues with different topics. The most important topics that he addressed there were Khatam e Nubuwwat (2011), Maghfirat (2011), Surah e Dahar (2012), Quran aur Wahdat (2013), Surah e Fajr (2014) and Hayat baad az Maut (2015) etc.
- In March-2014 Ayatullah Aqeel-ul-Gharavi visited City of Edmonton, Alberta Canada on the invitation of HCECA of Edmonton to address three Majalis in connection of Ayam E Fatmiah at Hussaini Centre.
- In 2016 and 2017, Syed Aqeel ul Gharavi visited India and addressed majalis and seminars in the cities like Lucknow, Delhi and Hyderabad. He also addressed majlis of Arbaeen in Karbala in 2017.
- In 2018, he went to India, Australia, Switzerland and Canada to address majalis in these countries.
- In 2019, Syed Aqeel-ul-Gharavi visited Muscat, Oman and addressed five majalis of Ayyam e Fatimiah on martyrdom of Fatimah. He also addressed three majalis of Ayyam e Fatimyah in Qom, Iran. Moreover, he also went to Sydney, Australia to address lectures and majalis there in the month of Ramadan.
- On the invitation of organisers of Masjid e Iranian in Mumbai, Syed Aqeel-ul-Gharavi went to Mumbai in order to address 10 Majalis of first Ashra (from 1st to 10th Muharram / 31 August to 9 September) in Masjid Iranian also known as Mughal Masjid. Thousands of people from all over Mumbai attended these majalis. ِ
- He addressed a majlis at HMJI Imambargah in Pune on 12 September 2019 (12th Moharram H.1441).
- His London Muharram Majalis's are featured on several channels such as Ahlebait TV (live), SUCH TV and 24 News HD.
- Khamsa-e-Majalis addressed by him in sayyed bada, Junnar (Dist:Pune) form 1st safar H.1444 (August 2022).

=== Return to Pakistan 2023 ===
After a gap of 7 years since 2017, Ayatullah Gharavi returned to address first Ashra in Karachi.

== Works ==
More than 22 of his works in Urdu language have been published which are in different fields like philosophy, theology, literature, supplications etc. Some of these works are based on his speeches delivered at Imambargah Shah e Shaheedan, Karachi. He has also written several books in English, Arabic and Persian languages. His first literary magazine Adabi Kainaat was published in 1980, when his age was about 16 years. Some of his published works are:

=== Urdu and English ===
1. Adabi Kainat (Founded 1981 and acted as Editor-in-chief) A literary magazine dedicated to the promotion of high Urdu literature, offering a platform for both classical and modern works, which includes religious and Indian cultural thought.
1. Naya Taleemi Tajreba (1985)
2. Angbeen (1987) (Granted award by the Delhi Urdu Academy).
3. Tajalliyat (2005)
4. Ilm-o-Irada (March 2005)
5. Chiragh-e-Rah (September 2004) -
6. Aiyna-e-Qaza-o-Qadr (January 2008)
7. Husn-e-Ikhtiyaar
8. Maqaam-e-Khatme Nubuwat aur Insaan
9. Wilayat-e-Haq aur Imam Hussain (as)
10. Falsafa-e-Meraj
11. Thematic study of the Holy Quran - (2002) (book in English language)
12. Eid-e-Hashr aur Jashn-e-Mahshar - Based on 10 lectures at Mehfil-e-Shahe Shaheedan, Karachi (2000)
13. Salaam-e-Shauq - Literary and spiritual exegesis of Ziarat-e-Waritha - (1994)
14. Dua
15. Wliayat e Uzma
16. Majalis e Gharavi (2009)
17. Tauheed aur Imam Hussain
18. Jahan-e-Taleem (A book based on the history of Hawza e Ilmiya Najaf)

=== Arabic ===
  1. Fiqh al-Ṣalāt ‘ala al-Nabī (SAW) (Jurisprudence) A jurisprudential study on the practice and significance of prayers (Ṣalāt) upon the Islamic prophet Muhammad.
  2. Al-Ḥadīth Bayn al-Isnād wal-Fiqh (Ḥadīth & ‘Ilm al-Rijāl) Analyzes the transmission of Ḥadīths and their role in Islamic jurisprudence, highlighting the science of authentication (‘Ilm al-Rijāl).
  3. Ru’ya Jadīdah fī Ḥadd al-Muḥārib - Baḥthun-Tafsīrī wa Fiqhī A detailed examination of Islamic view on Terrorism, definition of terrorist and the punishment for terrorism. A work of Qur’ānic interpretation (Tafsīr) and its legal applications in Islamic jurisprudence (Fiqh).
  4. Al-Bāb al-Thānī al-‘Ashar (‘Ilm al-Kalām) A theological discourse on Imam Al-Mahdi and other key topics in Islamic philosophy in regards to the twelfth Imam within the framework of ‘Ilm al-Kalām.
  5. Al-Ḥaqā’iq al-Īmānīyah (‘Ilm al-Kalām) Explores the essential truths of Islamic faith, addressing foundational beliefs through the lens of Fitrah (natural disposition).

== See also ==
- Ayatollah
- List of ayatollahs
- Syed (disambiguation)
- Syed Ali Raza Rizvi
- Syed Shehanshah Hussain Naqvi
