= Agha Bozorg Tehrani =

Iranian Shia scholar (1876–1970)

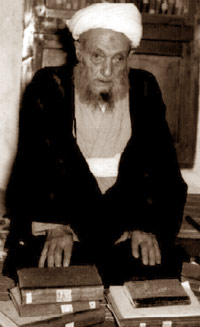

Ayatollah Sheikh Mohammed Mohsen Manzavi Tehrani, popularly known as Agha Bozorg Tehrani (Persian: آقا بزرگ تهرانی) (7 April 1876 – 20 February 1970), was a Shia scholar born and based in Tehran. He was a Shia scholar from Hawza Elmiye Najaf. He taught Grand Ayatollah Ali Hussaini Sistani, Grand Ayatollah Muhammad Hussain Najafi, and many others.

He wrote, among others, the following notable books:

- Al-Dharīʿa ilā Taṣānīf al-Shīʿa (List of Shia Books) (26 volumes), the list was compiled in 1908. It references 53,510 books written by Shia scholars.
- Ṭabaqāt aʿlām al-Shīʿa (List of Shia Ulema) (9 volumes)
- Mosannafet-e Shi`e (6 volumes)
- Mustadrak kashf al-ẓunūn or Dhayl kashf al-zunūn, Tehran, Maktabat al-Islāmiyya and also Ja'fari Tabrizi, 1387/1967.
