= Ahmed Al-Waeli =

Iraqi Shiite cleric

Aḥmad al-Waeli
- الشيخ أحمد الوائلي
- Born: September 3, 1928; Najaf, Iraq
- Died: July 14, 2003 (aged 74); Kadhimiya, Iraq
- Education: University of Baghdad (MA), Cairo University (PhD)
- Occupations: Shia Islamic scholar, preacher, and poet

Ahmed al-Waeli al-Laithi al-Kinani (1928–2003) (Arabic: أحمد الوائلي الليثي الكناني) was an Iraqi Arab Shia Islamic scholar, preacher, and poet. In addition to Islamic sciences in Najaf, he obtained a master's degree from the University of Baghdad and a PhD from Cairo University.

== Biography ==
Shaykh Dr. Ahmad bin Hassoun bin Saeed bin Hamoud al-Waeli al-Laythi al-Kanani al-Mudari al-Adnani was born on September 3, 1928 in Najaf, Iraq. He came from a well-cultured family; his father, Sheikh Hassoun Al-Waeli, was also a religious cleric and a poet, though he did not attain the same prominence as his son Ahmad. From a young age, Ahmad Al-Waeli showed intelligence and ambition. He studied and memorized the Qur'an by the age of seven. He graduated with honors in 1962 in Arabic language and Islamic jurisprudence. He then pursued further education at the Institute of Higher Education—part of the University of Baghdad—earning a master's degree in the same field. His thesis, titled Custody Rules in Sharia and Law, was later published as a book. Al-Waeli subsequently traveled to Egypt to pursue his doctoral studies and obtained a PhD in economics in 1972, focusing his dissertation on the Islamic perspective on labor exploitation.

As Najaf is renowned for its Shiite religious schools and Arabic literary heritage, Al-Waeli studied under several prominent religious scholars. He learned the art of lecturing from a number of Islamic preachers, including Sayyid Baqir Slaimoun, and earned admiration from his teachers for his intelligence, eloquence, and presentation style. Ayatollah Khomeini referred to him as “the Islamic Library” for his vast knowledge and dedication to teaching Islamic philosophy and jurisprudence. Similarly, Grand Ayatollah Abul-Qassim Khoei described him as “the Tongue of Shia,” emphasizing his role as a representative of Shia thought. In his lectures, Al-Waeli frequently emphasized that differences between Shia and Sunni jurisprudence should not lead to division, as both sects ultimately seek closeness to Allah. He stressed that each school of thought has its own Ijtihad (interpretation of Hadith), but such diversity should not create hostility. He consistently denounced those who labeled Shia as non-Muslims.

Al-Waeli died in Baghdad on 14 July 2003 after 24 years in exile. Thousands attended his funeral in the city of Najaf to mourn his passing.

== Presentation style ==
Al-Waeli was known for his presentation and lecturing style. The main characteristics of this school are:

1. Topic Focus: Unlike other Islamic lecturers, Al-Waeli concentrates only on one subject in each lecture and does not branch out to different subjects. The purpose of this is to avoid confusing and losing the audience's attention, and to provide enough details to cover the subject. Al-Waeli starts his presentation with a short statement that describes the focus of his lecture, usually a verse from the Qur'an.
2. Courage and Sincerity: Al-Waeli's confidence and knowledge gave him the courage to speak the truth and defend his school of thought.
3. Audience Evaluation: Al-Waeli would evaluate his audience before lecturing. This ability simplified the choice and depth of the topic he would present. Also, through this ability, he gained the audience's attention and interest.
4. Voice Pitch: Al-Waeli's vocal quality helped him articulate his speech.
5. High Morals: Al-Waeli was known for his moral virtues which contributed to his charisma and power of persuasion.

== Books ==
Al-Waeli wrote several books, including:

- The Essence of Shiism
- Custody Rules in Sharia and Law
- Islamic View of Exploitation of Labor
- The Defense of Truth
- My Experience with the Husayni Pulpit
- Toward a Scientific Interpretation of Qur'an
