= Saba Valadkhan =

Iranian American biomedical scientist

- Education: Columbia University
- Scientific career
- Workplaces: Case Western Reserve University
- Thesis: Catalytic and folding properties of protein-free spliceosomal snRNSs (2003)

Saba Valadkhan (Persian: صبا ولدخان) is an Iranian American biomedical scientist, and an Assistant Professor and RNA researcher at Case Western Reserve University in Cleveland, Ohio. In 2005, she was awarded the GE / Science Young Scientist Award for her breakthrough in understanding the mechanism of spliceosomes - "akin to finding the Holy Grail of the splicing catalysis field" - a critical area of research, given that "20 percent or 30 percent of all human genetic diseases are caused by mistakes that the spliceosome makes".

== Education ==
Valadkhan qualified as a medical doctor at Tehran University of Medial Sciences in Iran in 1996. She moved to the United States to pursue her Ph.D. at Columbia University, in New York City. In 2004, she joined Case Western Reserve University in Cleveland, Ohio as an Assistant Professor.

== Doctoral research ==
Valadkhan studied the role of small nuclear RNAs in the human spliceosome under the supervision of Prof. James L. Manley. The main focus of her research is elucidating the structure and function of the catalytic core of the spliceosome by taking advantage of a novel, minimal spliceosome she developed. This minimal system, which consists of only two spliceosomal snRNAs, catalyzes a reaction identical to the splicing reaction. In addition to providing direct evidence for RNA catalysis in the spliceosome, and thus, settling the longstanding and central question of the identity of the catalytic domain, the minimal system provides a novel and powerful tool for studying the structure and function of the spliceosome.

== Awards and honours ==
Valadkhan was presented with the Harold Weintraub award from the Fred Hutchinson Cancer Research Center in Seattle, Washington for her doctoral thesis. She was named a Searle Scholar in 2004. She was also awarded the American Association for Advancement of Science (AAAS) Young Scientist Grand Prize in the same year.

In 2006, she became a founding member of the Rosalind Franklin Society. She was also honoured with the Nsoroma Award from Cleveland Chapter of the National Technical Association in 2006.

== See also ==
- List of Iranian women
