= Abba Yahiyya =

Abba Yahiyya or Abu Yahiyya, was the leader of a sect of Afghani Alenzar (Nizariun Hagarenes) who followed an independent Ishmaili Sufi Herat tradition, introduced to the west by Idries Shah under the pseudonym of Omar Michael Burke in his 1976 book Among the Dervishes. The tradition that Isa ibn Maryam (Jesus Christ) lived in India is followed by around one thousand Nizariun devotees of Maryam's son Isa, who live in several scattered villages in northwestern Afghanistan, centered on Herat. This was first discovered by Burke, who personally interviewed their spiritual leader, Abba Yahiyya (Father John), while researching Ishmaili Sufism in the area. Alenzariun devotees also lived in South India and Kenya and were an inspiration for the Ansar nation of Islam movement, which placed the Messiah above Muhammed.

== Overview ==
In Among the Dervishes, author Burke records that in Herat he encountered around a thousand Nizariun Sufis who followed the teachings of "Isa, son of Maryam." Their chief, Abba Yahiyya or Father John, was able to recite a succession of Mages through sixty generations back to the Rock and finally "Isa, son of Mary, of Nazara, the Kashmiri." These clerics were partnered to "sadiqin" in India belonging to the house of Amram and Harun's line all the way back to Isa's maternal relatives Jakub Assadiq, Yahiyya and Zakariya. According to their tradition, their Magian ancestors had been seduced by the anti-namus dualism of Nasiruta until the Rock's missionaries came to guide their apostasy from Nasiruta back towards the siratulmustaqim, considering themselves a direct continuation of the pre-Islamic Sabiah Hunafa. The essential differences from other Ishmaelis are that they regard Muhammed as nothing more than a title for the chief Mages (the آبائ who may be male or female) in their magisterium of إخوان, which continues the roles of the nabi and observe a sabbath from Friday nights and whose responsibility is to protect the identity of the 36 pairs of Zealot families and their priestly kahan Azwajrasul, from the general laity through a system of social eligibility rules concerning courtship.

The Traditions of the Masih is the holy book of the community which they say completes the injeel, the Gospels being only part of the truth. Burke describes Abba Yahiyya as "a towering figure with the face of a saint," an erudite man who knows his own scriptures and the Jewish writings. Father Yahiyya considered the various sects of Christians known to us today as heretics.

Every celebratory occasion is marked by a festive meal called Al-Maeda, which always commences with a breaking bread blessing, and concludes with a thanksgiving toast although they do not drink wine. They carry daggers which are never drawn, use bathing garments, grow their hair long and wear turbans like the Sikhs. Ramadaan and Hajj are considered to occur at the right time (winter and spring respectively) for three years in a row at intervals of 33 years. At such a Hajj, Alenzar vows are fulfilled with sacrifices, headshaving, free-association and edible vine products.
