= Razi Abedi =

Pakistani author, activist and scholar

Razi Abedi is a Pakistani author, activist and scholar.

== Life ==
Abedi received an M.A. in English from University of the Punjab. In 1968, he went to England for higher studies and attained M.A. and Tripos from Cambridge University in 1969. He was particularly interested in Urdu literature in the context of third-world literature and the literature now being produced in the West. He also wrote extensively about education and its socio-cultural implications. He lectured on topics related to Romanticism. He passed away on 15 November 2025, at the age of 92.

== Works ==
- The Tragic Vision
- Search For Medium
- Educational Chaos
- Lays and Lyrics
- Man of the Streets
- Teesri Dunya Ka Adab (Urdu)
- Acchut Logon Ka Adab (Urdu)
- Maghribi Drama Aur Jadeed Adabi Tehrikain (Urdu)
- Teen Novel Nigar (Urdu)
- Kuch Ghazlain, Kuch Nazmain (Urdu poetry)
- Bazar ki Raunaq (Urdu)
- Jeevan Dhara, by Dr. Taha Hussain (Translation)
- Aik Naujawan Shair kay Naam Khatoot, by Rilke (Translation)
- Anar Kay Sai, by Tariq Ali (Translation)
