= Kalbe Razi Naqvi =

British Pakistani-Norwegian physicist (born 1944)

- Born: 26 May 1944 (age 82); Raebareli, United Provinces, British India
- Citizenship: British
- Education: University of Karachi, Pakistan; University of Manchester, U.K.
- Known for: Razi Naqvi Kinetic Law
- Scientific career
- Fields: Chemical and Biophysics
- Workplaces: Norwegian University of Science and Technology (NTNU); Norwegian Institute of Technology

Kalbe Razi Naqvi (Urdu: قلب رضی نقوی; born 1944) is a British Pakistani-Norwegian physicist, who has been ordinarily resident in Norway since 1977, working as a professor of biophysics in the Norwegian University of Science and Technology. He retired at the end of June 2014, and is now a Prof. Emeritus in NTNU.

== Early life and education ==
Born in Rae Bareli, British India in 1944, Naqvi received his school and university education in Karachi, and moved to the United Kingdom in 1964, when the University of Manchester awarded him a research scholarship. He joined the molecular physics group, and obtained his Ph.D. in 1968 for a thesis entitled “Delayed light emission from organic molecules in solution”. The Royal Society of London appointed him to a Rutherford Scholarship for the period 1968–71 to continue his work on the behaviour of the excited states of molecules. In 1969, he moved to the Department of Chemistry, University of Sheffield, where he stayed for five years.

== Research in chemical physics ==
Naqvi became a naturalized British citizen in 1974, but left Sheffield for the Physical Chemistry Laboratory, Swiss Federal Institute of Technology (ETH) in Zurich. In 1976, he reported the first example of a comparatively rare phenomenon: electronic energy transfer, mediated by electron exchange, from a triplet donor to a double acceptor; in his experiments, the donor was the benzophenone triplet and the acceptor was the benzophenone ketyl radical.

== Research in biophysics ==
Since moving to Trondheim in 1977, Naqvi has worked on a wide range of problems within physics, chemistry and biology, dividing his time equally between theory and experiment and between the pure and the applied. These topics include: (1) calculation of Franck–Condon factors, (2) applications of linear transport theory to chemical kinetics, diffuse reflection spectroscopy, and phonon transport in semiconductors, (3) spectroscopy of absorbing and scattering specimens, (4) primary photophysical processes in carotenoids, vitamin E and related molecules, (5) revival of quantum wave packets, (6) photoprotection in artificial and natural photosynthesis, (7) use of diffusive gradient in thin films (DGTF) for the in situ measurement of the labile forms of chemical elements in aqueous environments, sediments and soils, and (8) non-invasive measurement of blood pressure.

Naqvi’s many coauthors include a very large number of scientists from all over the world. Within NTNU, his collaborators include, apart from many physicists, several chemists (analytical, organic, physical) and two mathematicians. In addition to his steady research output, Naqvi has manifested his commitment to teaching by contributing to journals devoted to didactical aspects of science (American Journal of Physics, European Journal of Physics, Journal of Chemical Education).
