= Athar Ali (scientist) =

Pakistani system engineer and rocket scientist

- Born: 20 August 1963; Muzaffargarh, West Pakistan, Pakistan
- Died: 4 October 2003 (aged 40); Karachi, Pakistan
- Education: NED University of Engineering and Technology
- Known for: Pakistani missile and space program
- Awards: Hilal-i-Imtiaz (2004)
- Scientific career
- Fields: System engineering
- Institutions: Space and Upper Atmosphere Research Commission (SUPARCO)
- Doctoral advisor: Dr. Ehtasam Hussain Shah

Dr. Athar Ali (20 August 1963 – 4 October 2003) was a Pakistani system engineer and a rocket scientist who was murdered in Karachi on 4 October 2003. He was an expert in missile technology and was the senior scientist at the Space and Upper Atmosphere Research Commission (SUPARCO) during the time of the development of Shaheen missile guidance system. SUPARCO is a Pakistani governmental agency. His death led to the mass demonstration in a Shiite community in Karachi.

== SUPARCO career ==
Having joined SUPARCO in 1985, Ali was associated with the rocket's electrical and electronics system. Thereafter, he specialised in missile technology while the Hatf missile system was being developing. At the SUPARCO, Ali was one of the senior scientists involved in the indigenous development of the Shaheen guidended missile systems, and was responsible for the program's electrical and system power engineering at the SUPARCO. In 2002, due to his contribution to the agency, he was promoted as the deputy-director of the commission.

== Assassination and culprits ==
In the afternoon of 4 October 2003, Ali along with 35 members of SUPARCO were on the way to SUPARCO Headquarters. At the 12:45 pm, the SUPARCO bus dropped some people at a nearby mosque. Three unidentified armed men opened fire.

This drive-by-shooting lasting just a few minutes, left five dead and eight others wounded including officials of the Pakistan Army who were on guard duty at the facility. The bodies of the victims were taken to the Murshid Hospital where they were pronounced as dead. Later, the dead bodies were shifted the bodies to the Rizvia Imambargah.

== Investigation ==
According to the online news of Pakistan, the Indian external agency, Research and Analysis Wing (RAW) has been behind the attacks. The source also concluded that RAW hired activists of Quetta-based Balochistan Liberation Army (BLA) outlawed outfit for this incidence of terrorism and real target was Athar Ali who was, in the past, was targeted twice but he was able to manage an escape from the scene. The following day of the killings, the FIA had arrested the RAW agent and few other members of BLA. However, Indian Government has denied the allegations and its agency's involvement in the assassinations.

== Aftermath ==
Athar Ali's death brought mass demonstration in the shiite community in Pakistan. The shiite religious parties condemned the death of Dr. Ali, and accused the Government of Pakistan in the death. The non-profit organisation, Imamia Students Organisation (ISO), Anjuman Tahaffuz Azadari (ATA), and Tehrik-i-Islami (TI) activists on Saturday staged a demonstration to condemn the killings in Karachi. After the mass demonstration in Karachi, the FIA's special agents arrested the culprits and masterminds of the killings. All of the members were closely associated with the Sipah-e-Sahab and Lashkar-e-Jhangvi. The associated members were hanged and executed by the Government of Pakistan.

== Further references ==
- Athar Ali Biography
- Khan, Kamran (2003), "Shia-Sunni violence in Karachi", Aaj Kamran Khan Kay Saath
