= Hafiz Riaz Hussain Najafi =

21st-century Pakistani Ayatollah

Syed Riaz Hussain Najfi آیت اللہ حافظ سید ریاض حسین نجفی
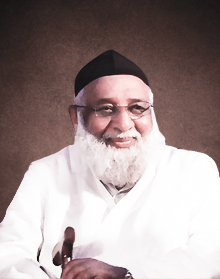
- Title: Ayatollah

Personal life
- Born: 1 January 1941 (age 85) Alipur, Pakistan
- Other names: Arabic/Persian/Urdu: حافظ سید ریاض حسین نجفی
- Website: jamiatulmuntazar.com

Religious life
- Religion: Usuli Twelver Shi`a Islam

Senior posting
- Based in: Lahore, Pakistan
- Post: Mujtahid
- Period in office: 1941 – present

Hafiz Syed Riaz Hussain Najafi is a Shia scholar from Pakistan. He is the principal of Jamia-tul-Muntazar Lahore, the largest Shia madrassah in Pakistan.
