= Naser Makarem Shirazi =

Iranian Shia marja' and religious leader (born 1927)

Grand Ayatollah Naser Makarem Shirazi
- ناصر مکارم شیرازی
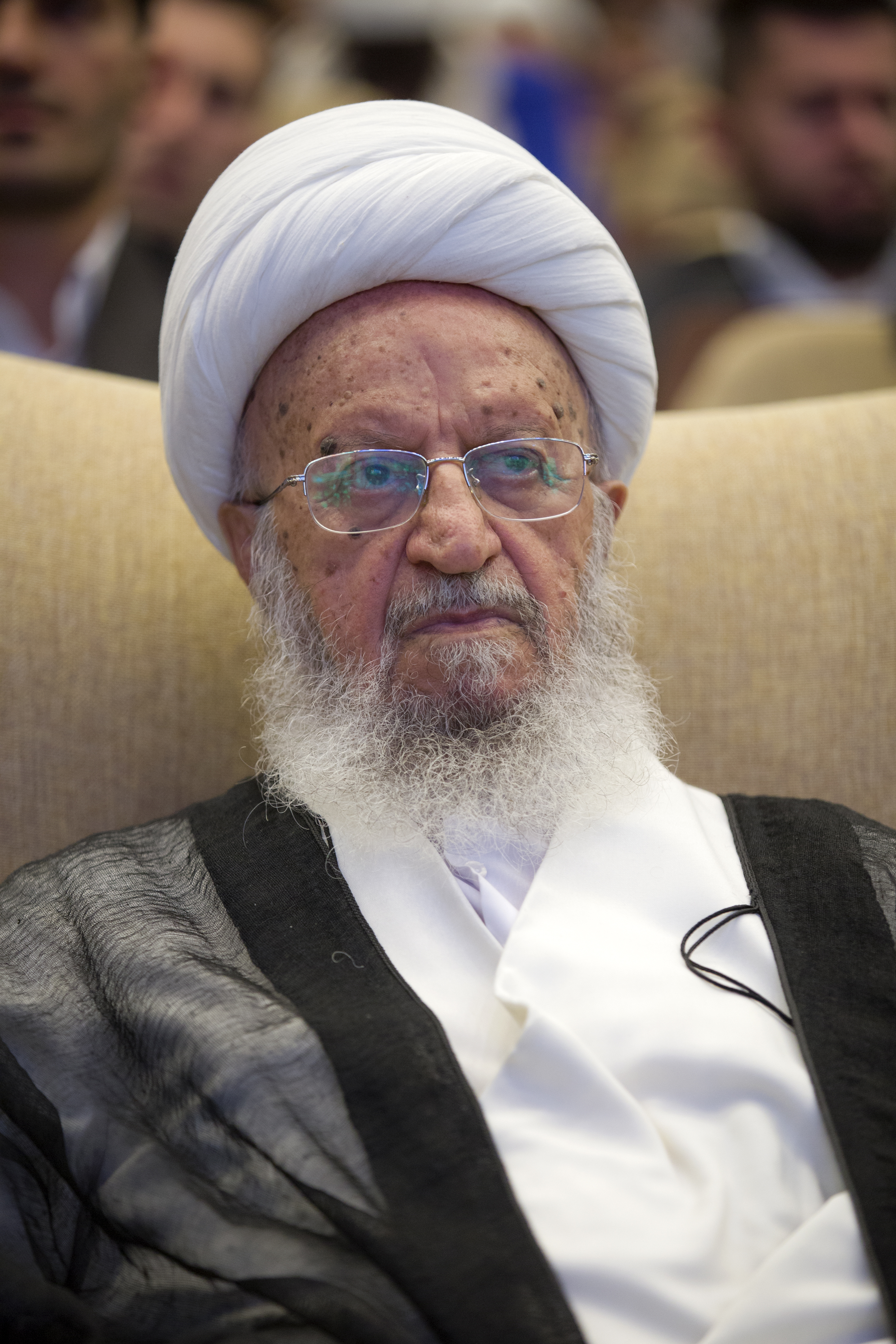
- Shirazi in 2017

Member of the Assembly of Experts for Constitution
- In office 15 August 1979 – 15 November 1979
- Constituency: Fars province
- Majority: 518,149 (84.2%)

Personal details
- Born: 25 February 1927 (age 99) Shiraz, Imperial State of Persia
- Party: Society of Seminary Teachers of Qom
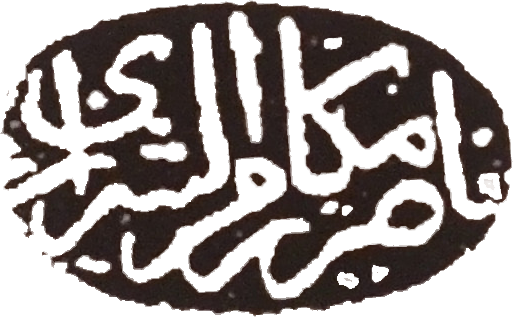
- Signature
- Website: makarem.ir
- Theological work
- Religion: Islam
- Denomination: Twelver Shīʿā
- School: Jaʿfari
- Main interests: Fiqh, Kalam and Tafsir

Grand Ayatollah Naser Makarem Shirazi (Persian: ناصر مکارم شیرازی; born 25 February 1927) is an Iranian Shia marja' and religious leader.

== Biography ==
Shirazi was born in the city of Shiraz, Iran on 25 February 1927. According to his website, his father was Ali Mohammad, his grandfather was Mohammad Karim, his forefather was Mohammad Baqer, and his progenitor was Mohammad Sadeq. He finished his school in Shiraz.

He started formal Islamic studies at 14 in the Agha Babakhan Shirazi seminary. After completing the introductory studies, he studied jurisprudence (fiqh) and its principles (usool al-fiqh).

He made rapid progress and finished studying the introductory and intermediate Islamic studies levels in approximately four years. During this time, he also taught at the Islamic seminary in Shiraz.

At the age of 18, he formally entered the theological seminary of Qom, and for the next five years, was present in the religious gatherings and classes of some of the leading Islamic teachers of those days, such as Ayatollah Muhammad Hussein Burujerdi, & Ayatollah Seyyed Kazem Shariatmadari.

=== In Najaf ===
In 1950, he made his way to the seminary of Najaf, Iraq. Here, he was able to take part in classes of teachers such as Ayatollah Muhsin al-Hakim, Ayatollah Abul-Qassim Khoei and Ayatollah Abdul Hadi ash-Shirazi.

At 24, two senior scholars in Najaf granted him complete ijtihad. Ayatollah Muhsin al-Hakim also wrote a short, comprehensive letter of commendation for him.

In 1951, he returned to Qom, since he did not have the means to survive and continue his studies in Najaf.

After returning to Iran, Ayatollah Naser Makarem Shirazi began teaching the intermediate and higher level of studies in usul al-fiqh and fiqh. Also, he was a member of the editorial board of the first Islamic magazine published in Iran named "Maktab'e Eslam", next to Ayatollah Shariatmadari.

He has won the Iranian Royal Academy of Philosophy award for his essay "Filsuf-Namaha".

== Fatwas (rulings) and statements ==
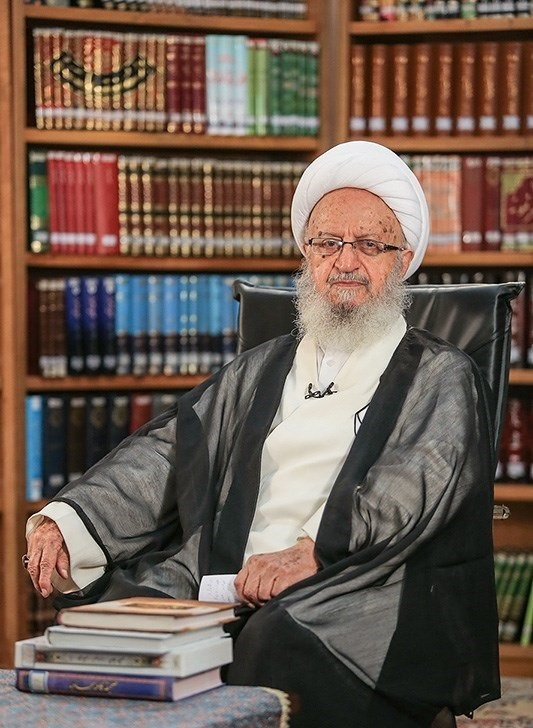
Makarem Shirazi in his office in 2016

=== Women's attendance in stadia ===
In the aftermath of an attempt by President Ahmadinejad to allow women to attend soccer matches in stadiums, Makarem issued a fatwa objecting to this.

=== Alternatives to stoning ===
Makarem's fatwa concerning stoning to death for adultery reads: "In certain circumstances, death by stoning can be replaced by other methods of punishment".

=== Smoking ===
Makarem issued a fatwa declaring smoking as forbidden (Haram).

=== Dogs and pets ===
In 2010, he responded to a request inquiring why a dog is considered unclean under shariah despite a lack of any prohibition on keeping dogs as pets in the Quran. In his fatwa, he emphasized that under shariah, dogs are indeed considered unclean based upon riwayahs, reliable narrations (hadith) handed down from the Islamic prophet Muhammad and his household. Makarem described the current Iranian inclination toward dogs as "blindly imitating the West"; something that he believes will result in "evil outcomes."

Iran's Ministry of Culture and Islamic Guidance reacted to this fatwa by banning all advertisements for keeping, buying, and selling pets.

=== Holocaust ===
In September 2010, he was quoted by the Islamic Republic News Agency (IRNA) as saying, "The Holocaust is nothing but superstition, but Zionists say that people of the world should be forced to accept this. The truth about the Holocaust is not clear. When the researchers want to examine whether it is true or the Jews have created it to pose as victims, they jail the researchers".

=== Underage marriage ===
About the marriage of girls under 13 years of age, which is allowed in Iran under certain circumstances, he has stated that, although such marriages were permitted in the past, in modern times, it has been demonstrated that they are not in the best interest (maslahat) of the parties involved and should be considered invalid.

=== Gender roles ===
On his official website, in a post about Men's Day, Makarem states that the "key issue which is neglected by feminist movements" is that they "promote gender equality and they neglect the fact that the rights and responsibilities of human beings must suit their physical and psychological potentials and capabilities. When these capabilities are neglected, any law created to regulate human affairs will be sheer injustice."

=== Homosexuality ===
"Since the family is the building block of human society, such problems within the family can then extend to the society, creating social problems such as a decreased marriage rate, the spread of homosexuality, and sexual promiscuity."

=== World leaders ===
In June 2025, he issued fatwas against Israeli prime minister Benjamin Netanyahu and US president Donald Trump, for what Shirazi claimed were threats against Iran's Supreme leader Ayatollah Ali Khamenei. The fatwas name Netanyahu and Trump as "Enemies of God" (mohareb) and promises rewards as "Mojaeh [warriors] in the path of Allah”. Under Iranian law anyone who is declared a mohareb faces the penalty of death. In March 2026, following the assassination of Ayatollah Khamenei, Shirazi issued a fatwa against the United States and Israel, calling for Muslims to take revenge for Khamenei's death.

== Political career ==
Ayatollah Makarim Shirazi was active in the Pahlavi era, hence he was jailed many times. He was even exiled on three occasions to Chabahar, Mahabad and Anarak. After the 1979 Iranian Revolution, he was appointed to the Assembly of Experts for construction and played a major role in writing the first constitution. He is no longer a member of the government, and resides in the city of Qom.

On 23 November 2014, and after months of preparations, he finally managed to gather in over 600 religious scholars from around the world in a conference titled The International Congress on Extremist and Takfiri Movements in the Islamic Scholars' View. It was a meeting for discussing controversial issues effecting the Muslim world, especially Takfiri movements. After the first successful hosting in which he condemned the inaction in the face of ISIL atrocities, he decided to reorganize another conference, Extremism and Takfiri Movements in Today’s World on 28 January 2016, to further focus on the responsibilities of the Muslim scholars regarding the unwelcome emergence of extremism. At the second congress same as the first one, scholars of more than 80 countries received invitations and about one thousand people participated.

He has also been described as a senior cleric in Iran and a supporter of the Iranian government and Supreme Leader Ali Khamenei. He has warned that U.S. President Donald Trump seeks to form an “Arab NATO” and has called on Muslims to “wake up” and remain vigilant against what he describes as U.S. plots. He is also portrayed as a defender of Iran’s domestic and foreign policies.

== Selected bibliography ==
Some of his publications include:" "

- the Message of Quran
- OUR BELIEF
- Khums the Fund of Independence of Bait Al Mal
- Quran Translation and Commentary in Brief
- Life under the Grace of Ethics
- Universal Government of Mahdi
- Islamic Law
- sexual problems of the youth
- Shia Answers
- Commentary on the book Kifayatul Usul (at age 18)
- The Manifestation of Truth‌
- Commentary on the Quran (Tafsir Nemooneh)
- The Message of the Quran
- Anwar al-Fuqahah
- al-Qawaidul Fiqhiyyah
- The Limits of Azadari
- They Will Ask You
- 50 Life Lessons from the Ahl al-Bayt (a)

== See also ==
- List of current maraji
- Qom
- Ijtihad
- Marja
- Ali al-Sistani
- Abdollah Javadi Amoli
- Abu al-Qasim al-Khoei
- Muhammad Hossein Naini
- Muhammad Kazim Khurasani
- Mirza Husayn Tehrani
- Abdallah Mazandarani
- Mirza Ali Aqa Tabrizi
- Mirza Sayyed Mohammad Tabatabai
- Seyyed Abdollah Behbahani
