= List of burial places of Abrahamic figures =

The following is a list of burial places attributed to Abrahamic figures according to various religious and local traditions. The locations listed are based on locations mentioned in the text of the Bible or oral traditions of indigenous peoples. Many sites have been transmitted from generation to generation and there are historical accounts from travelers which state their existence.

== Figures mentioned in the Torah ==
Burial sites of Abrahamic figures mentioned in the Torah

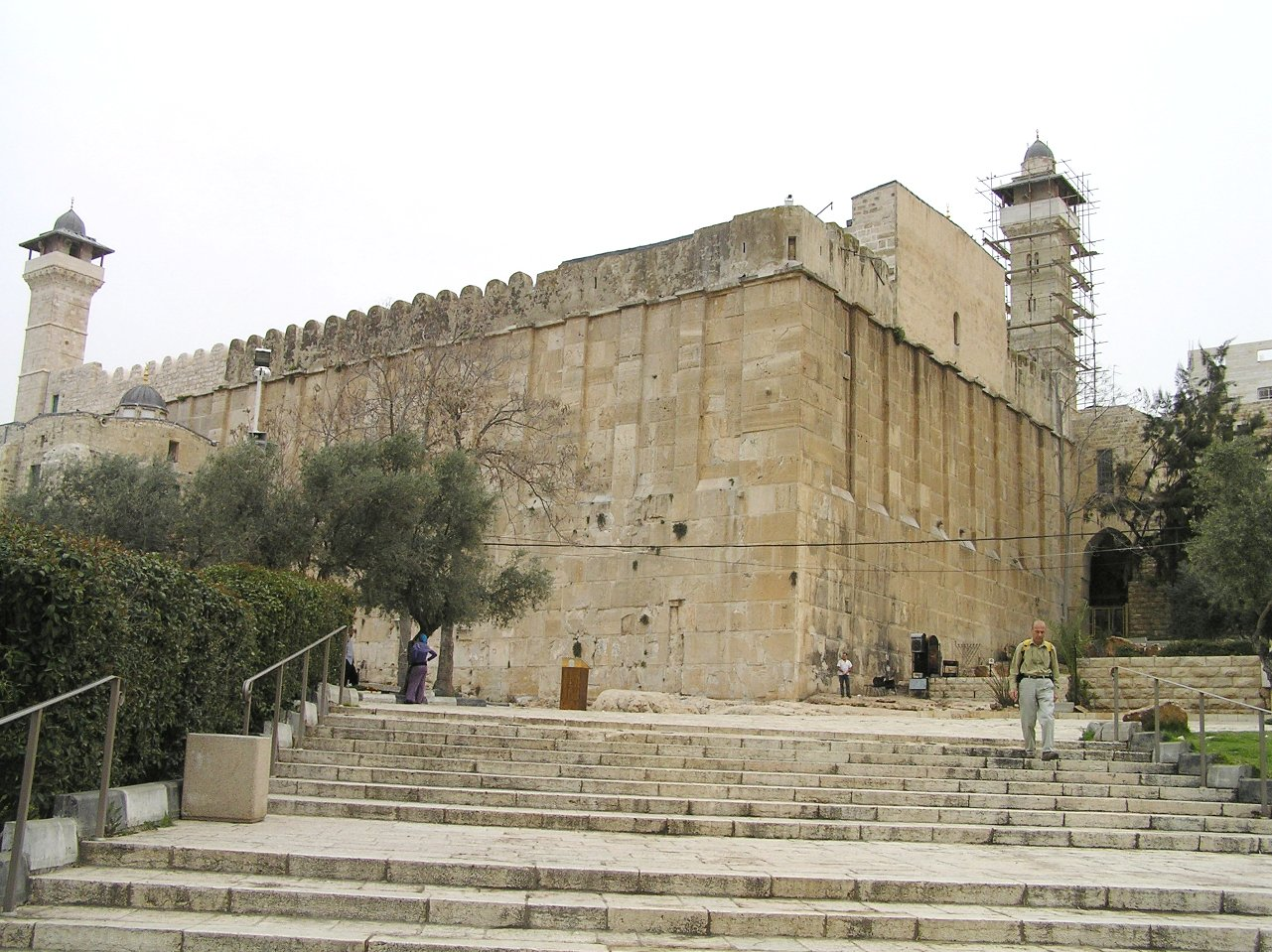
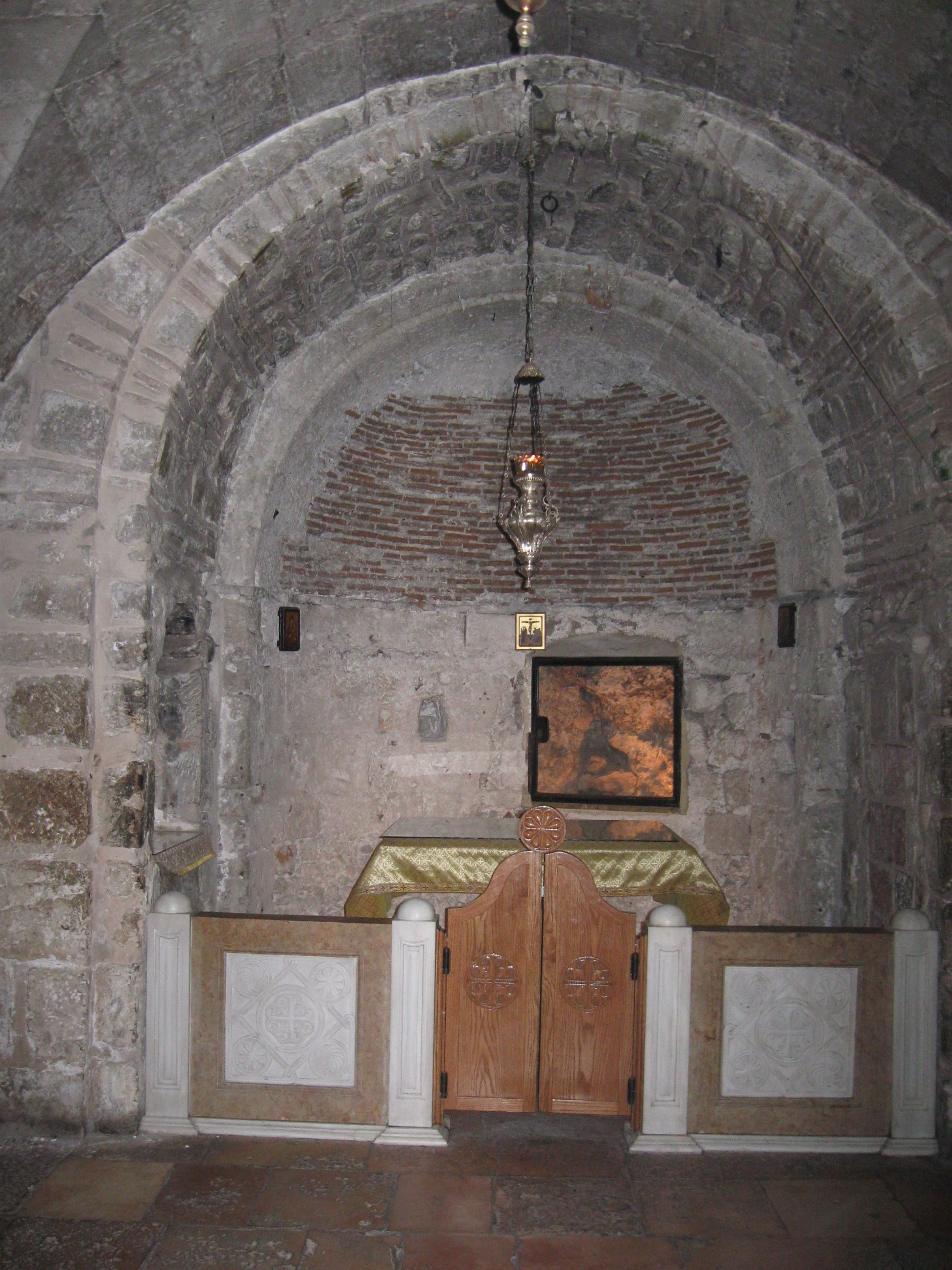
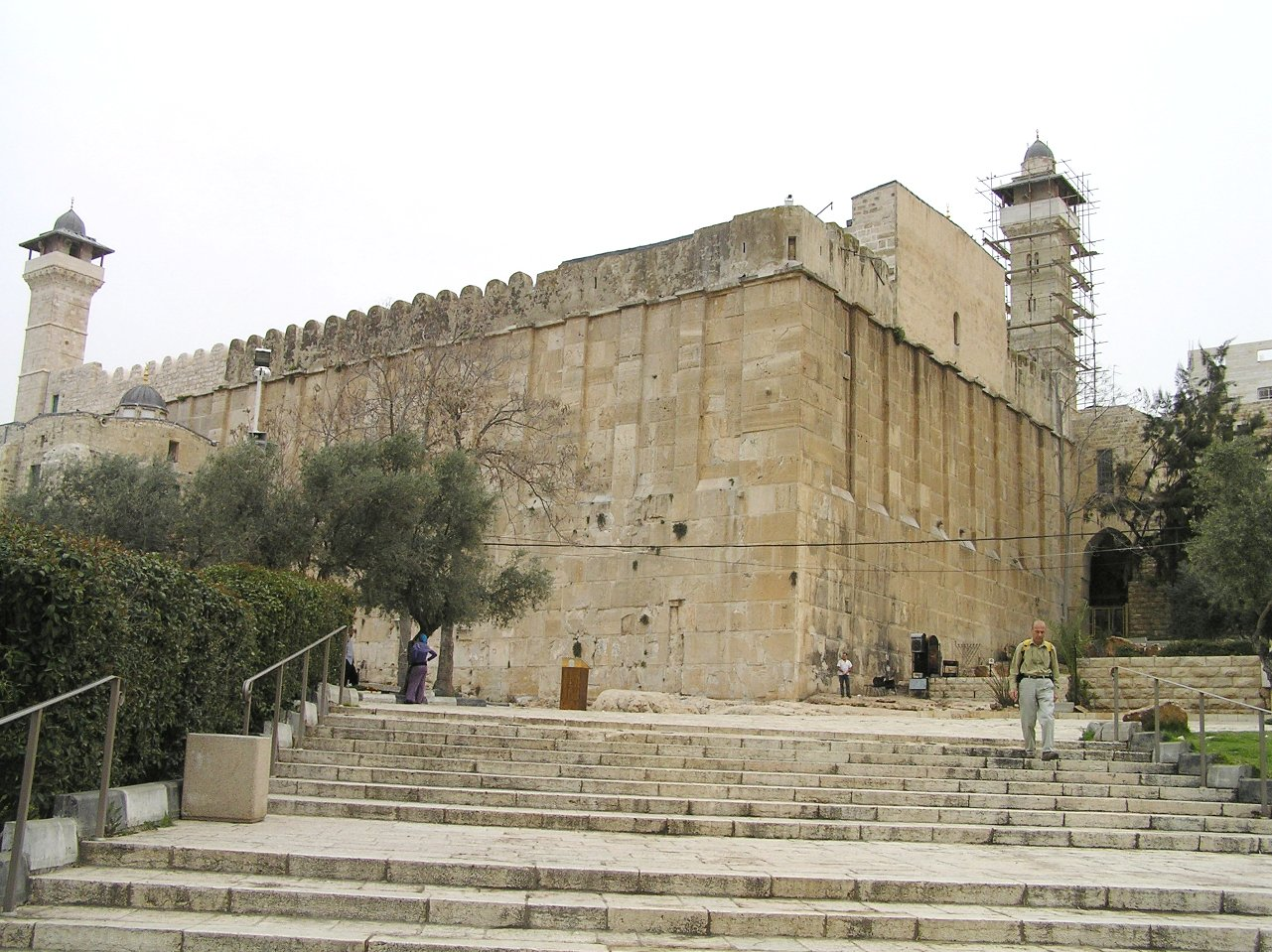
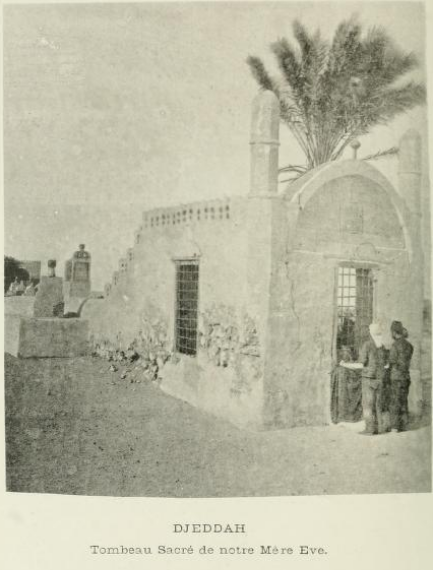
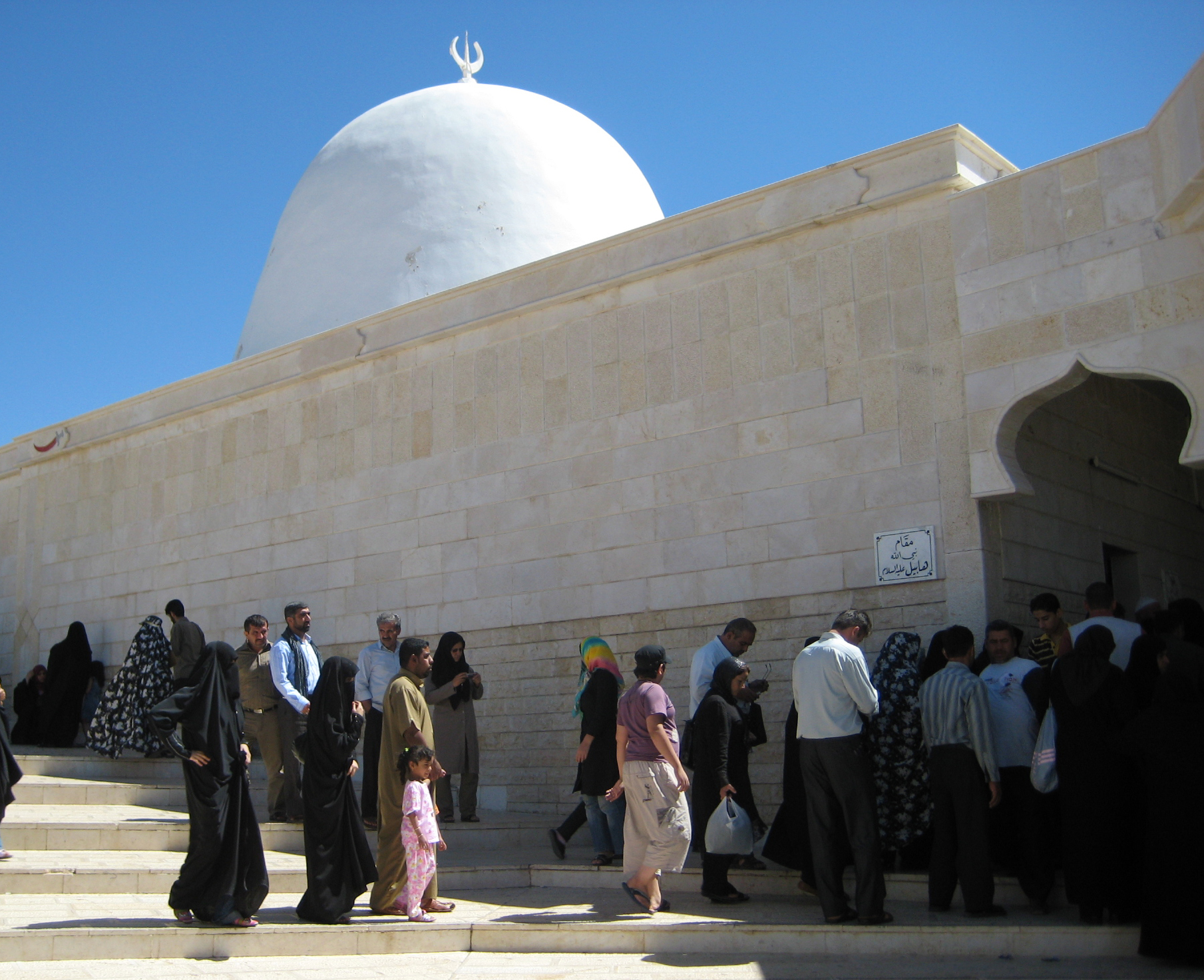
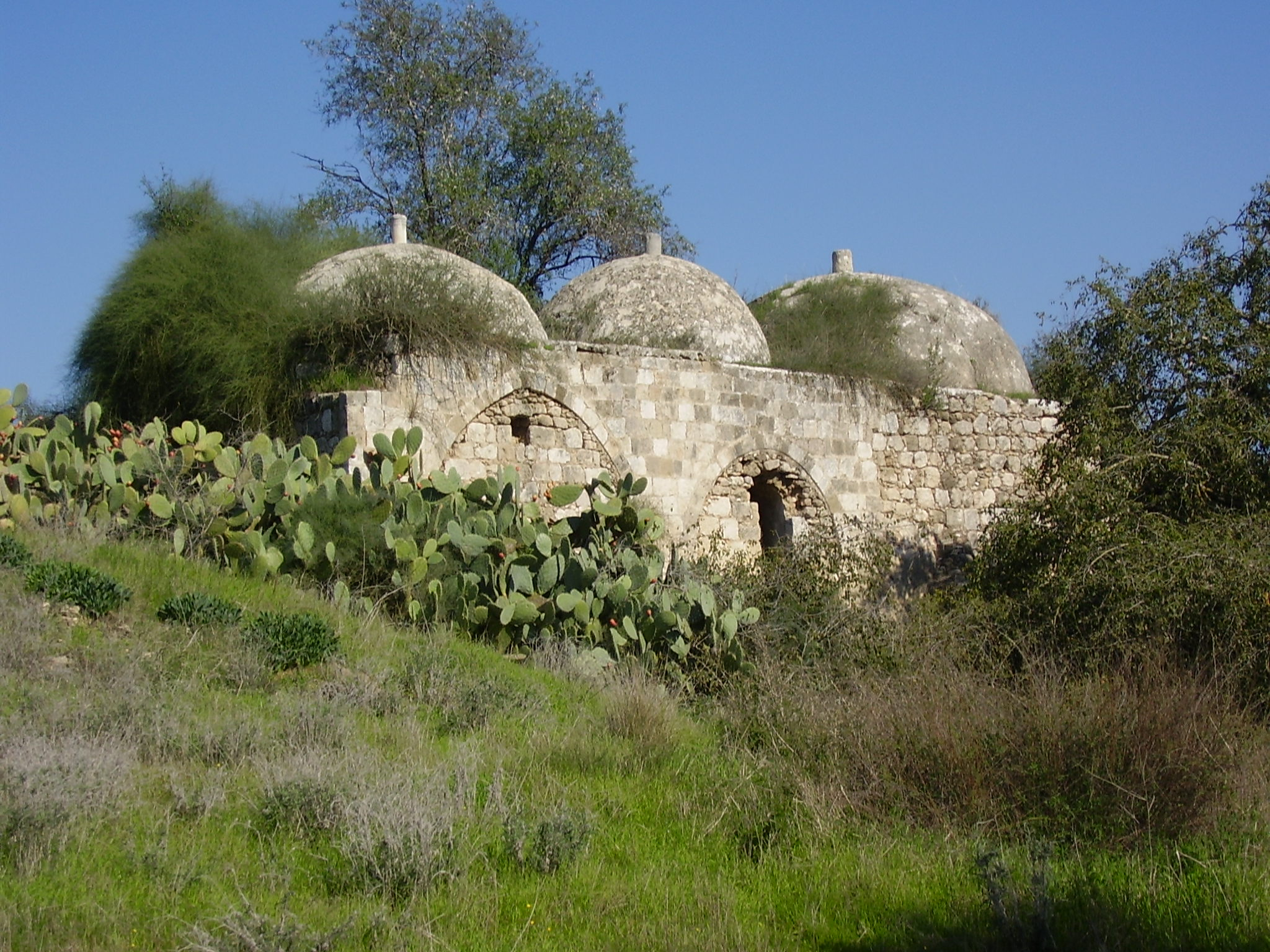
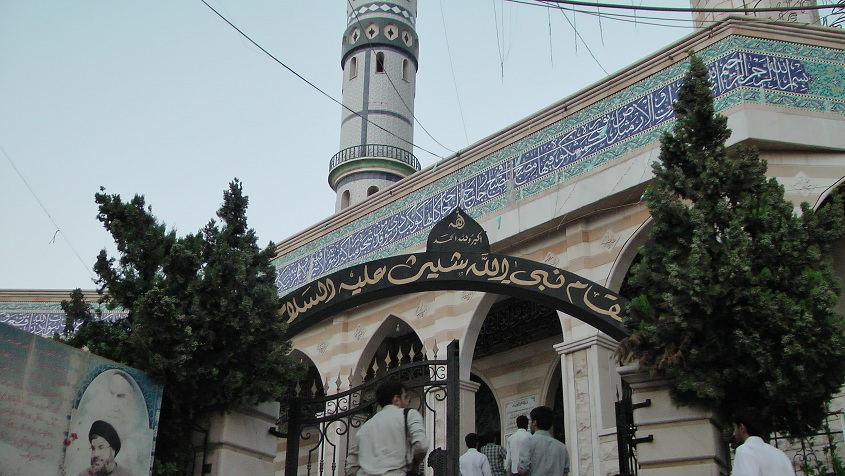
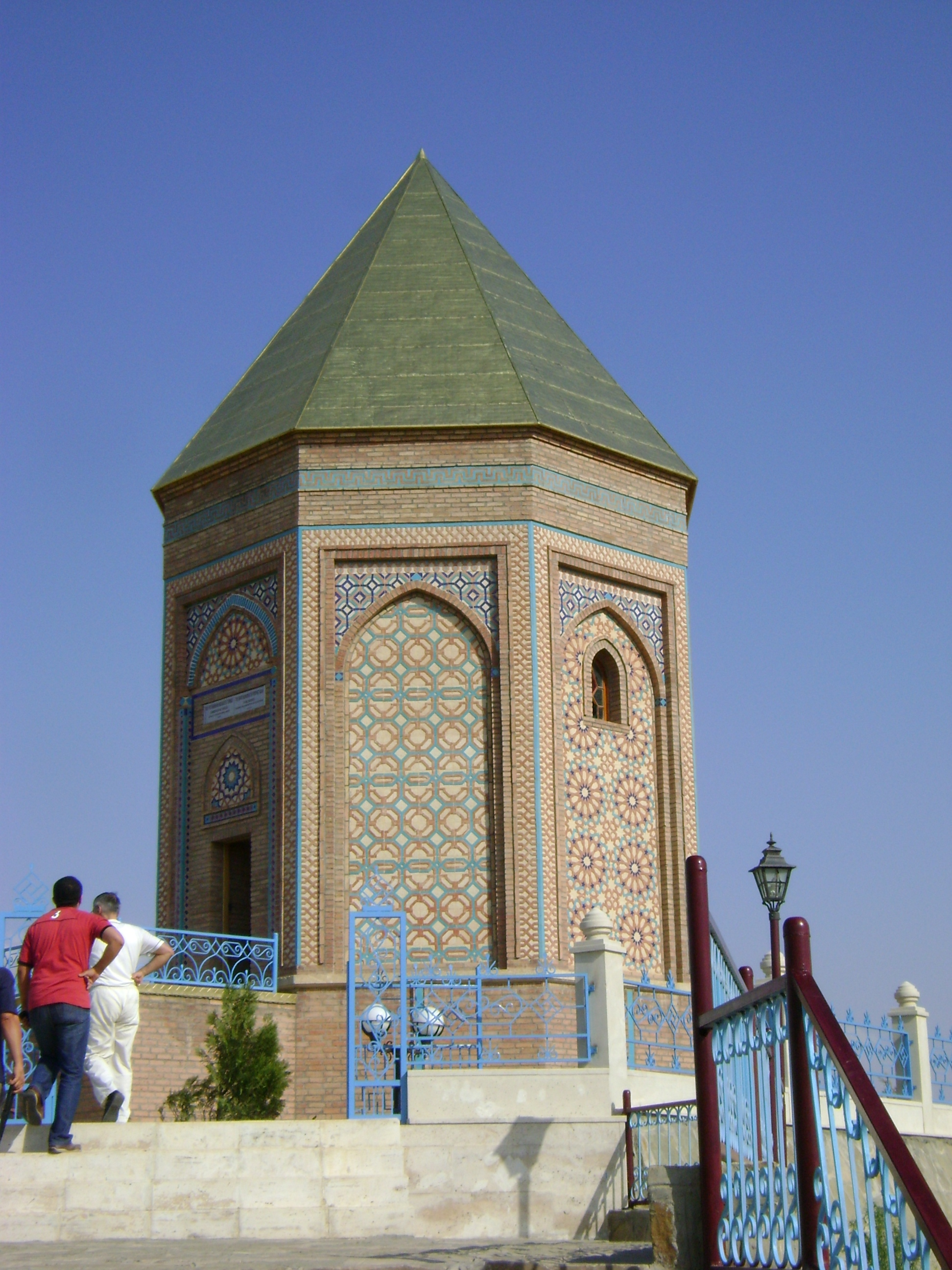
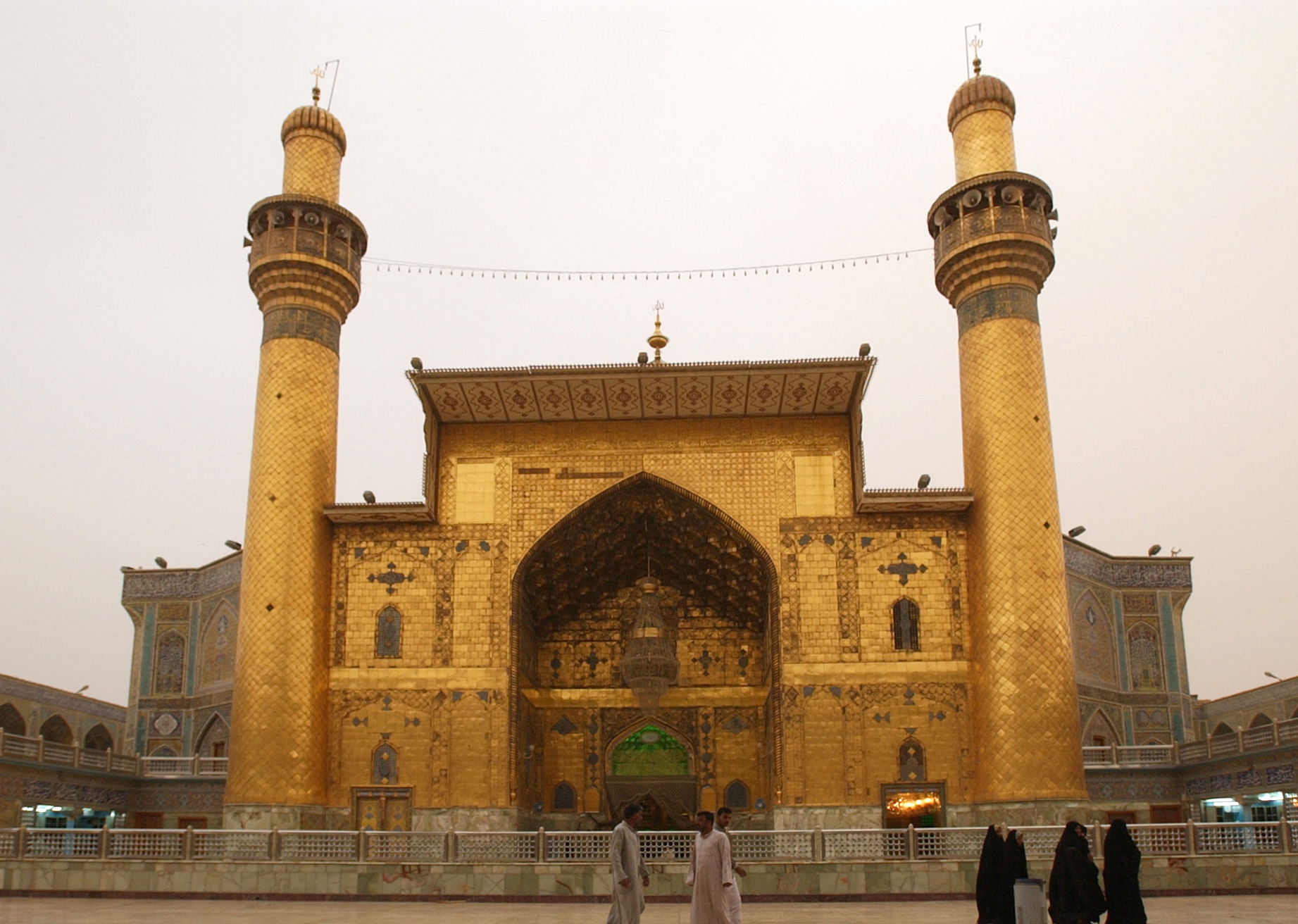
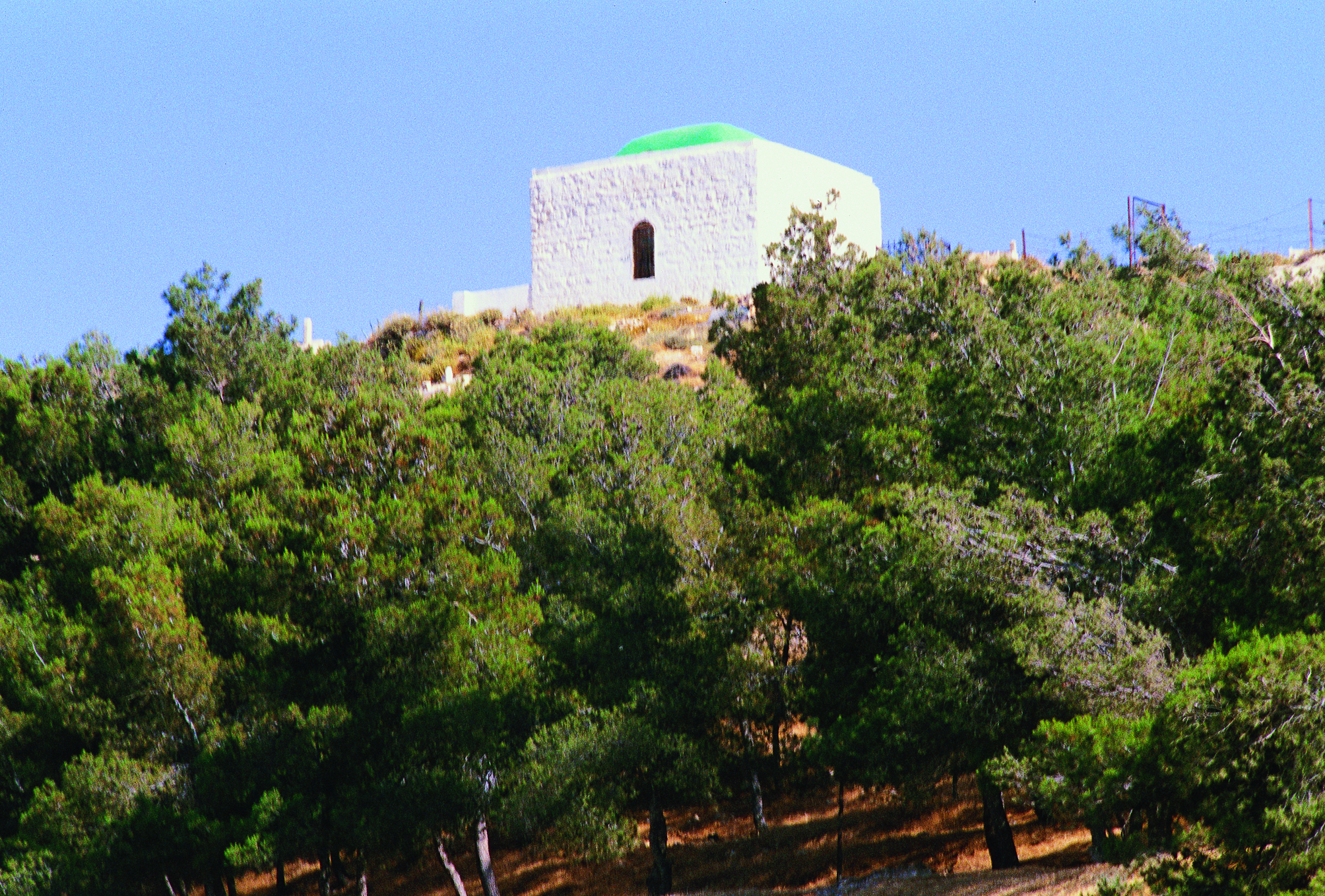
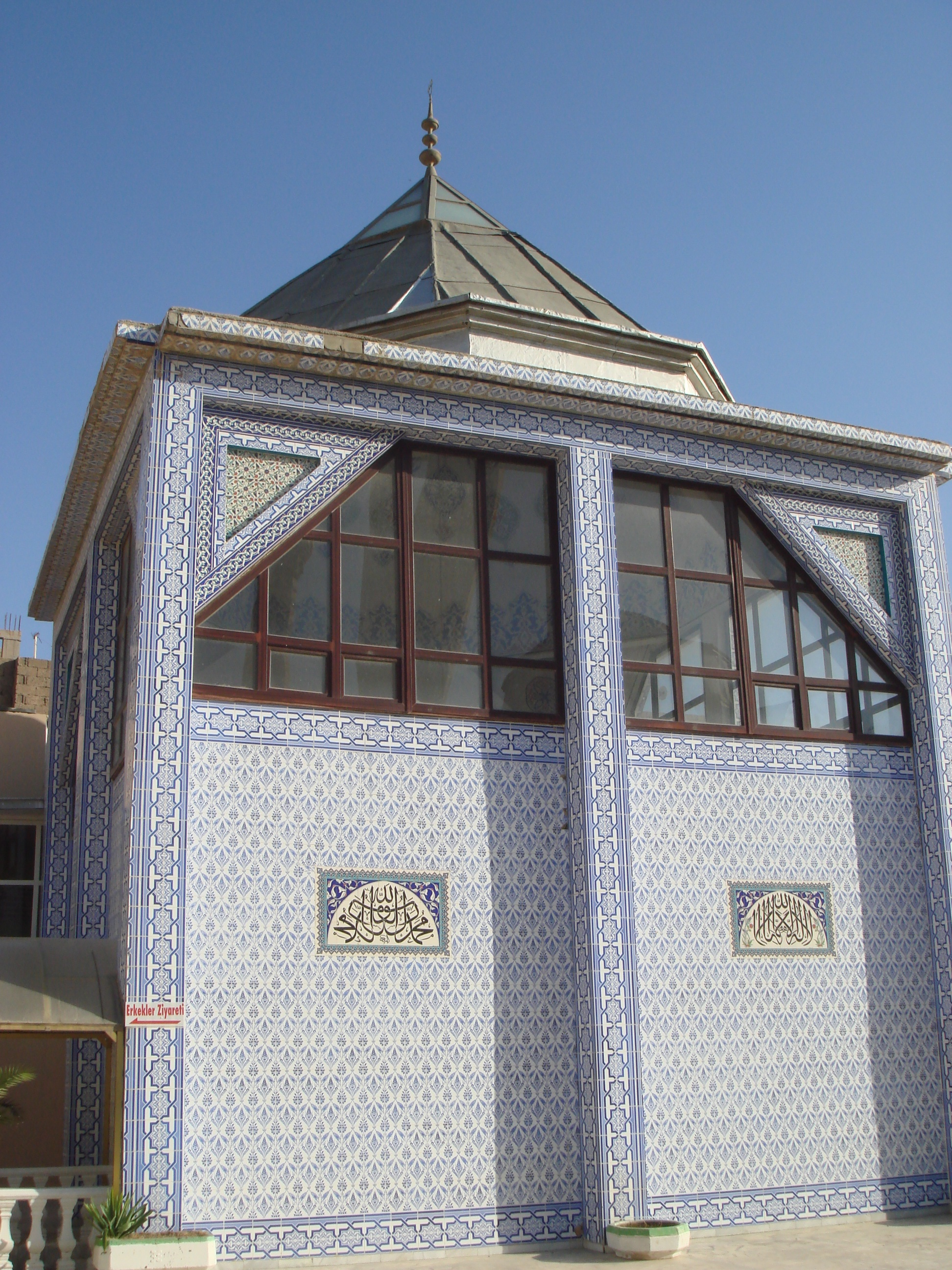
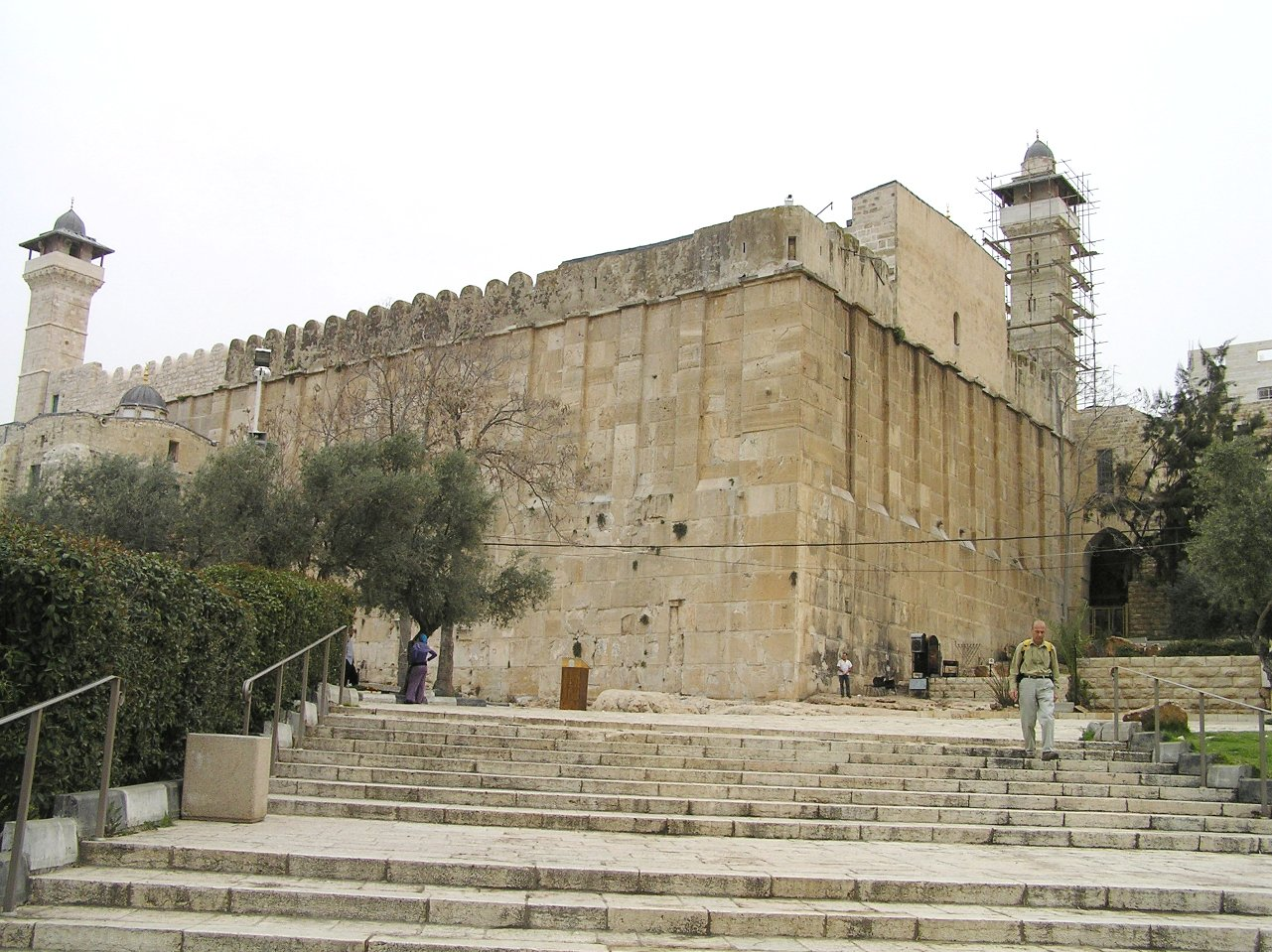
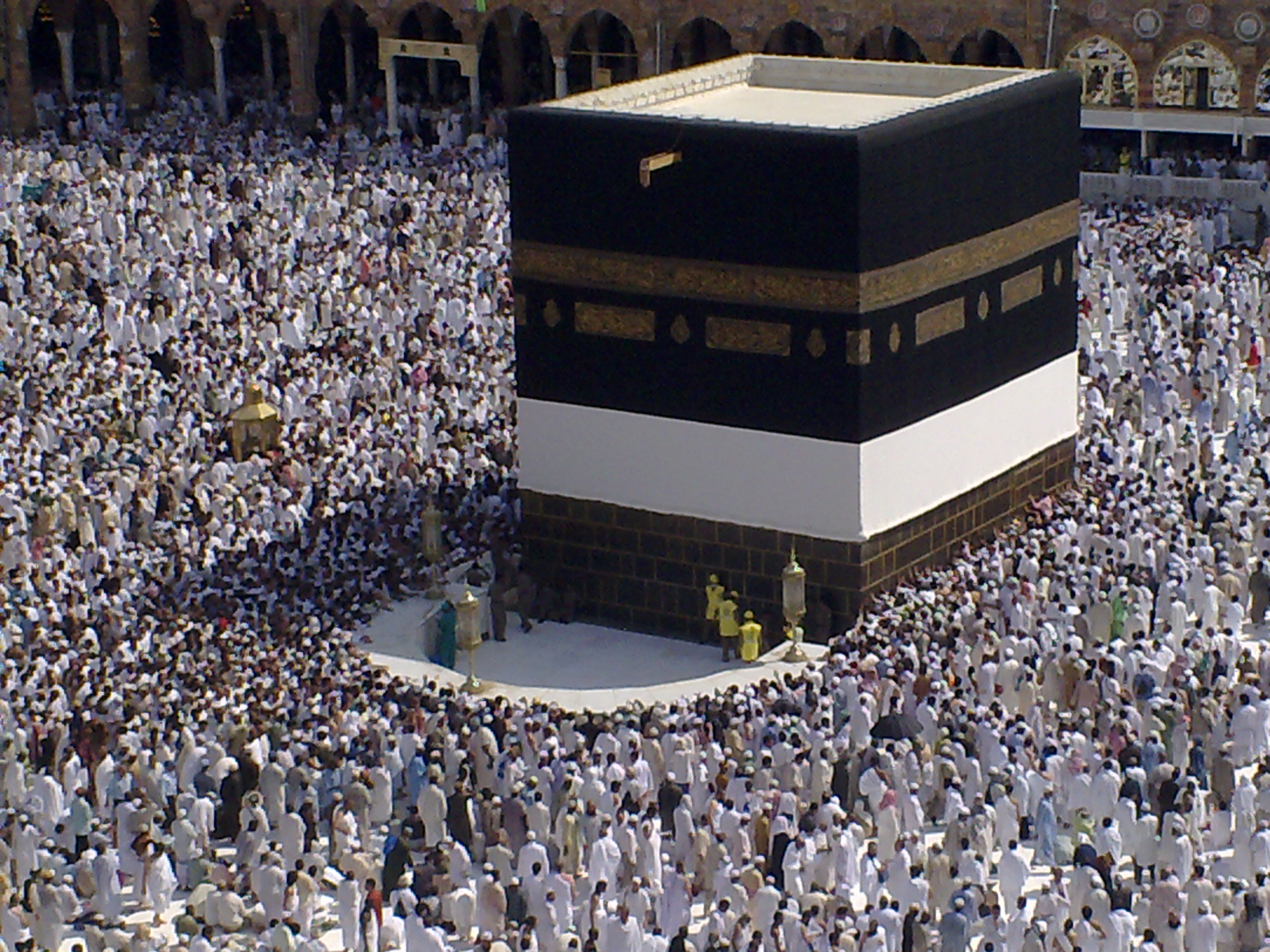
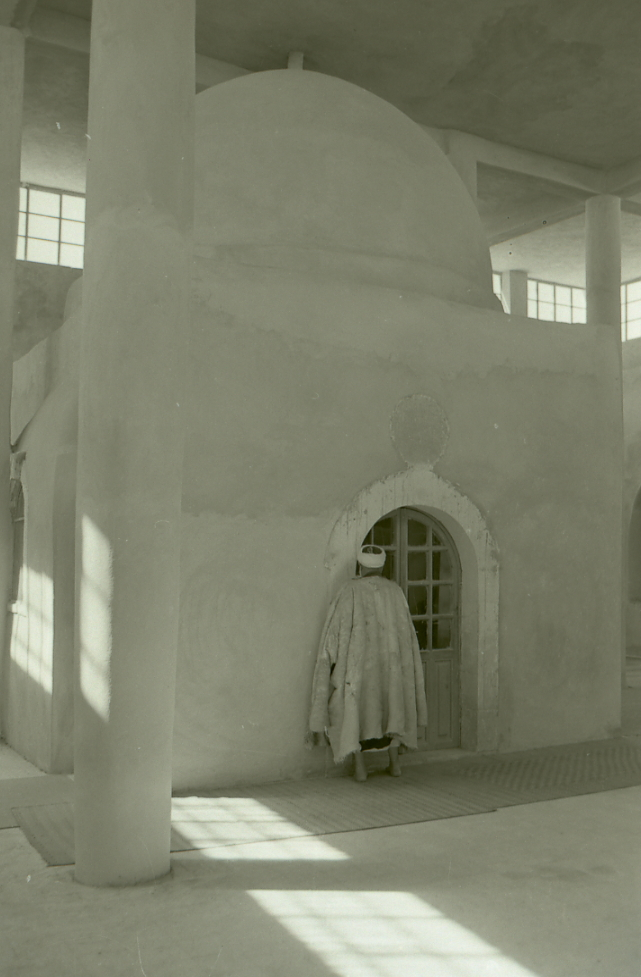
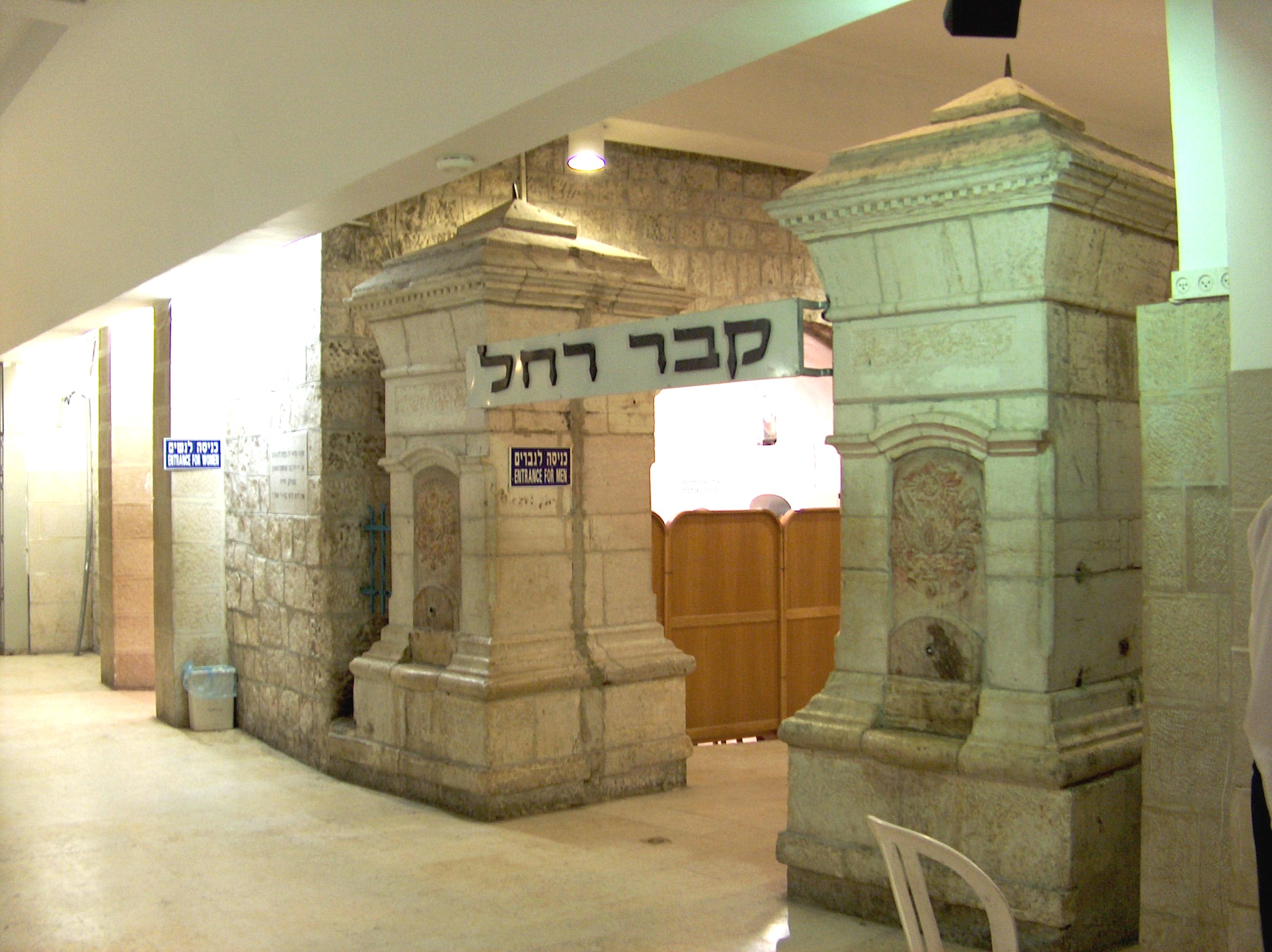
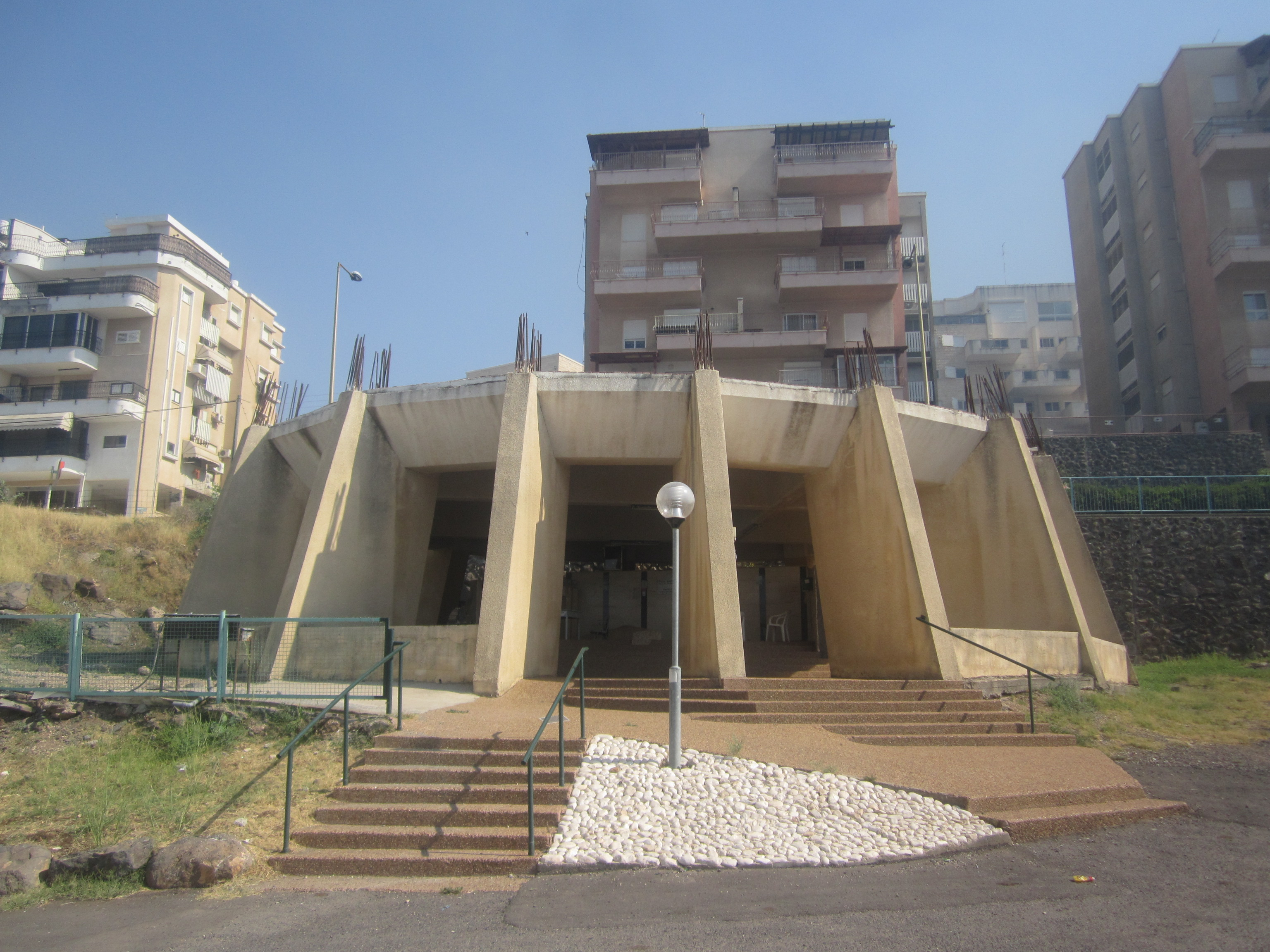
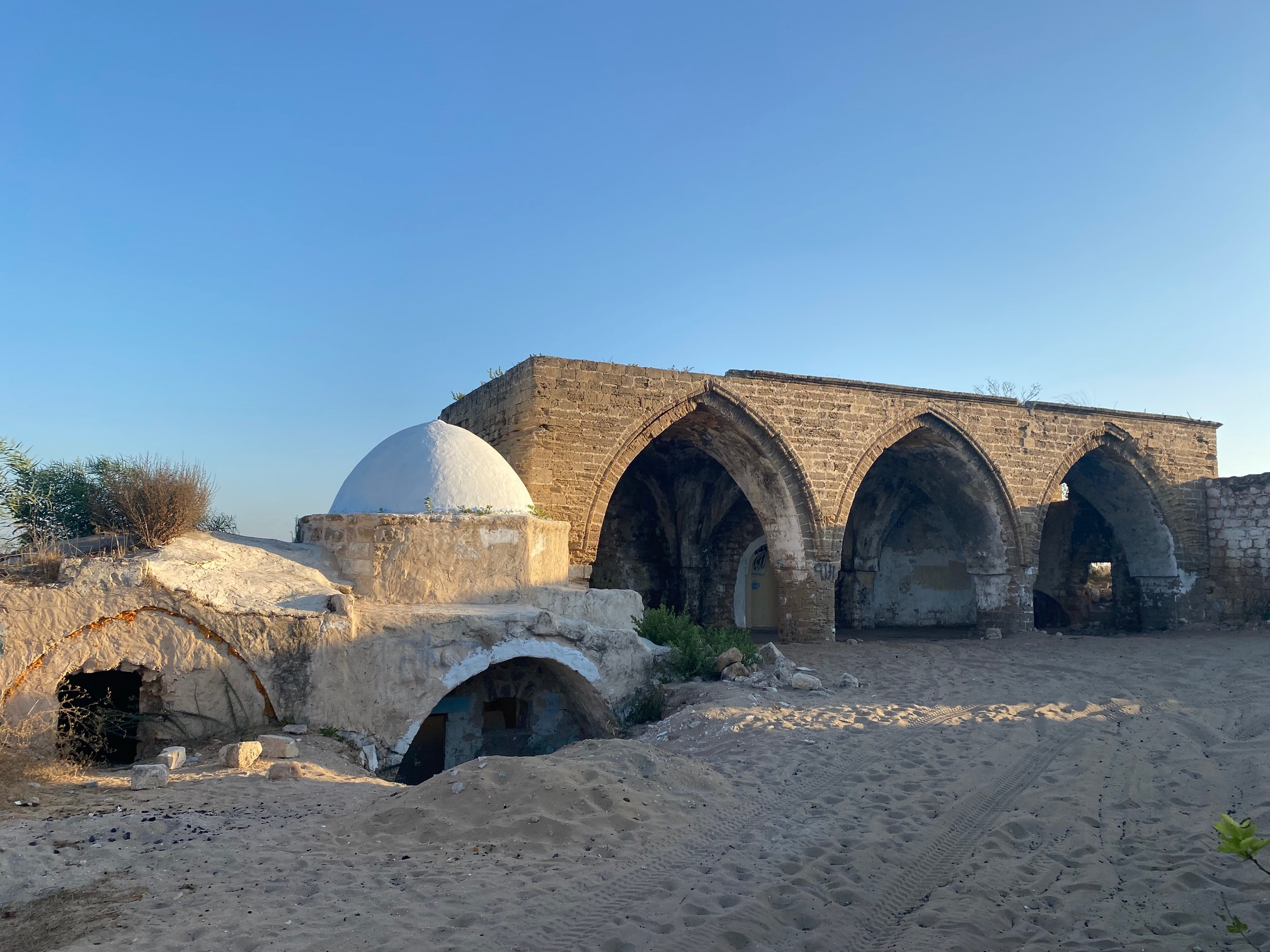
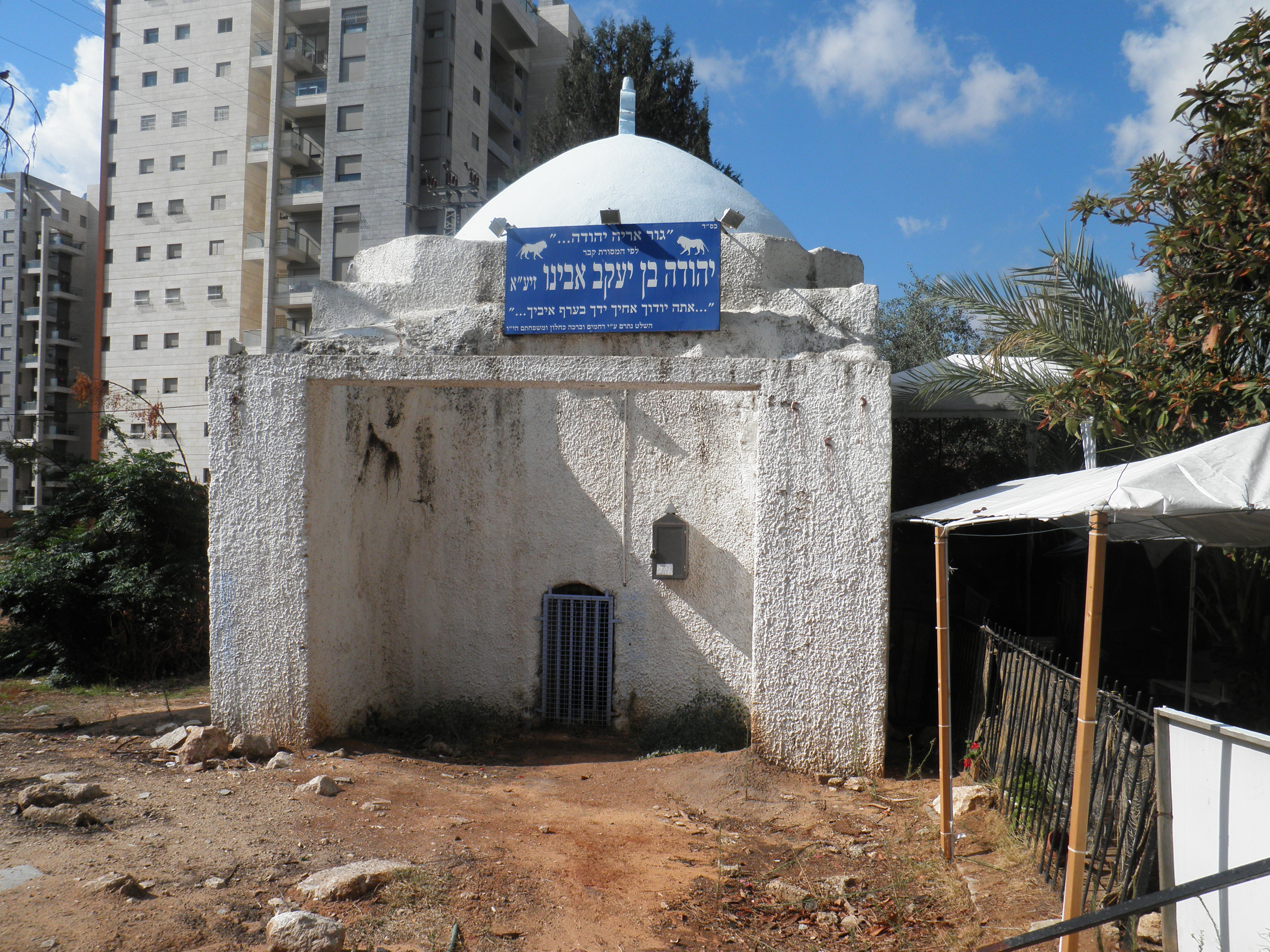
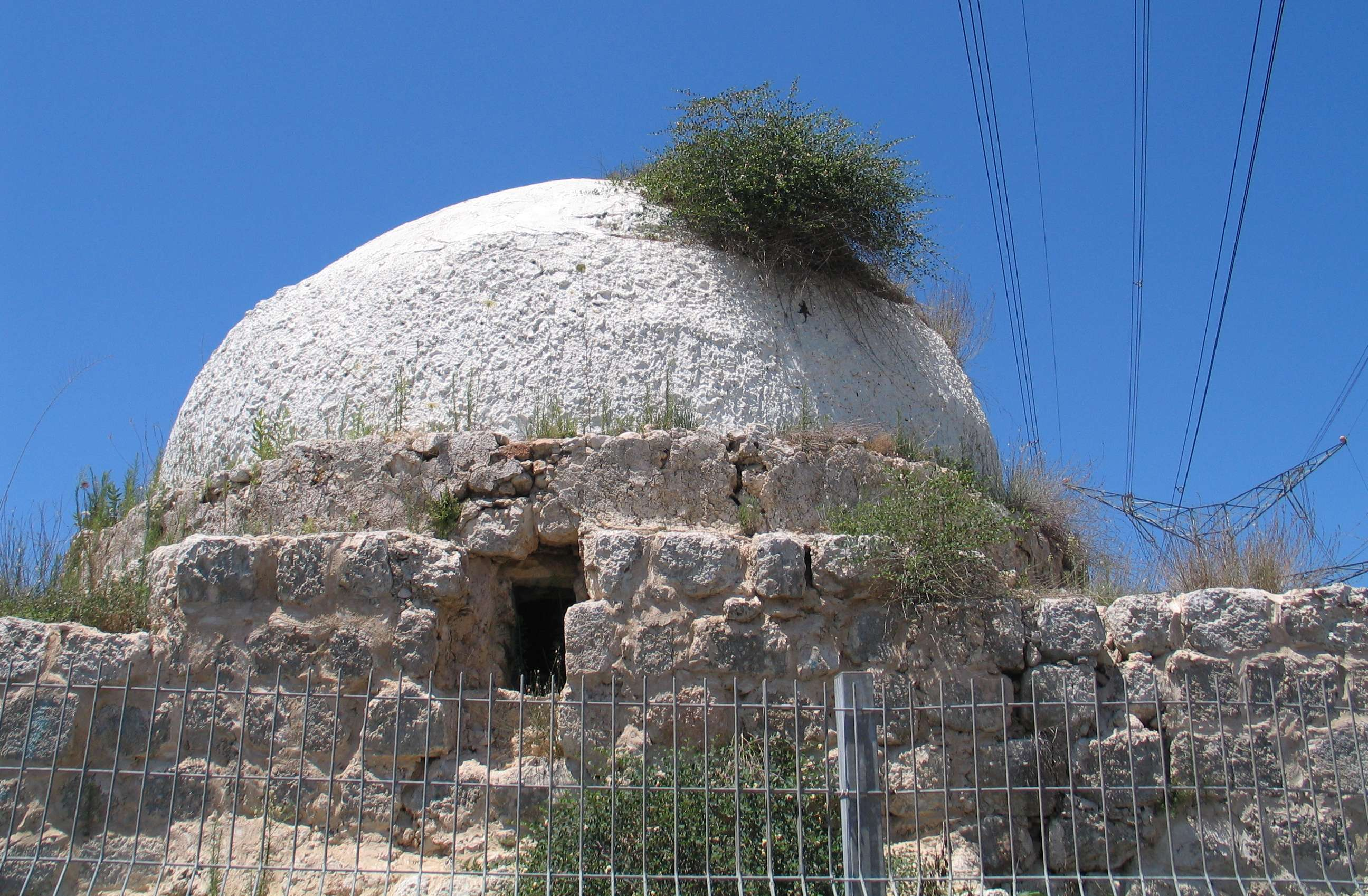
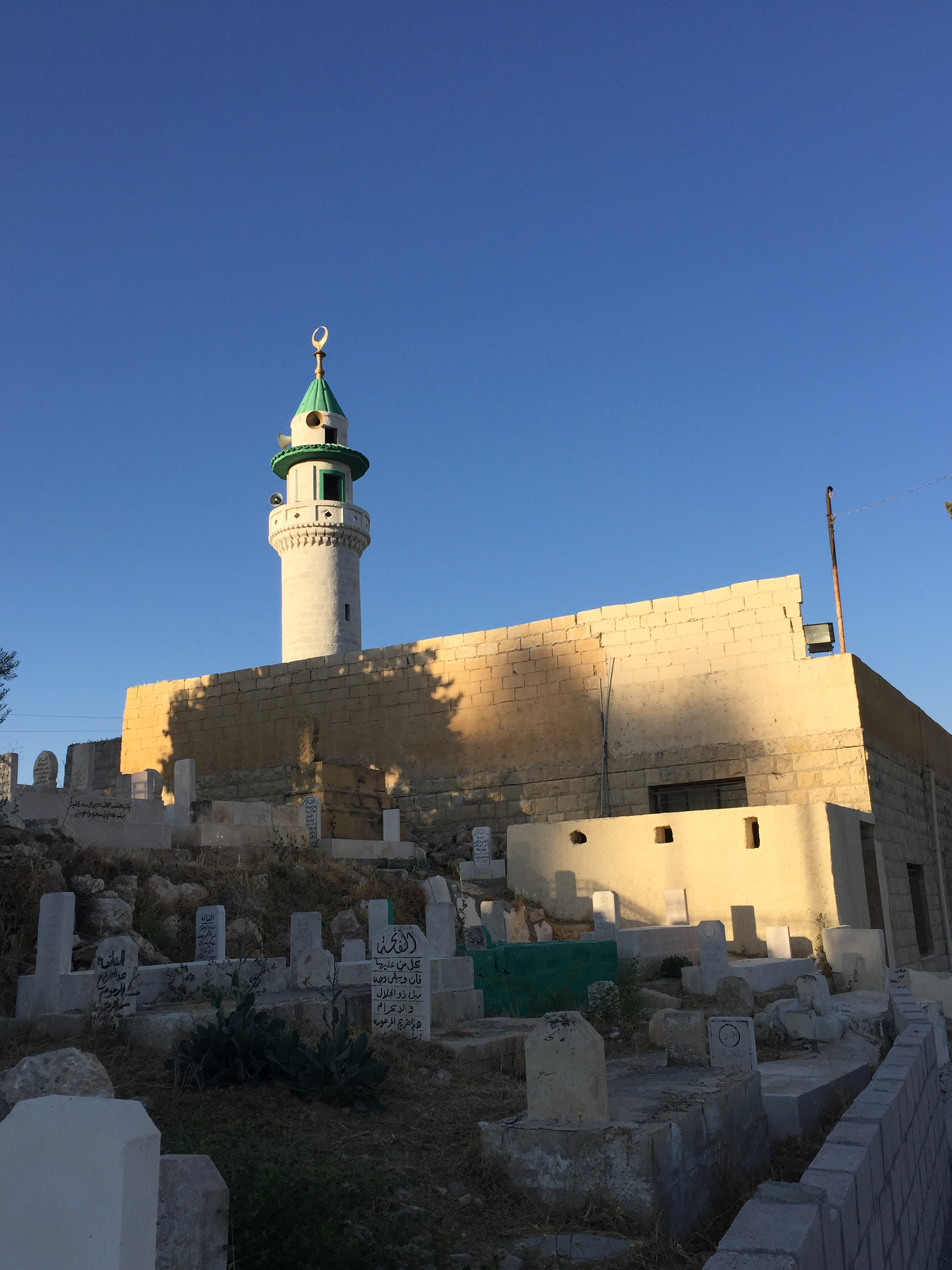
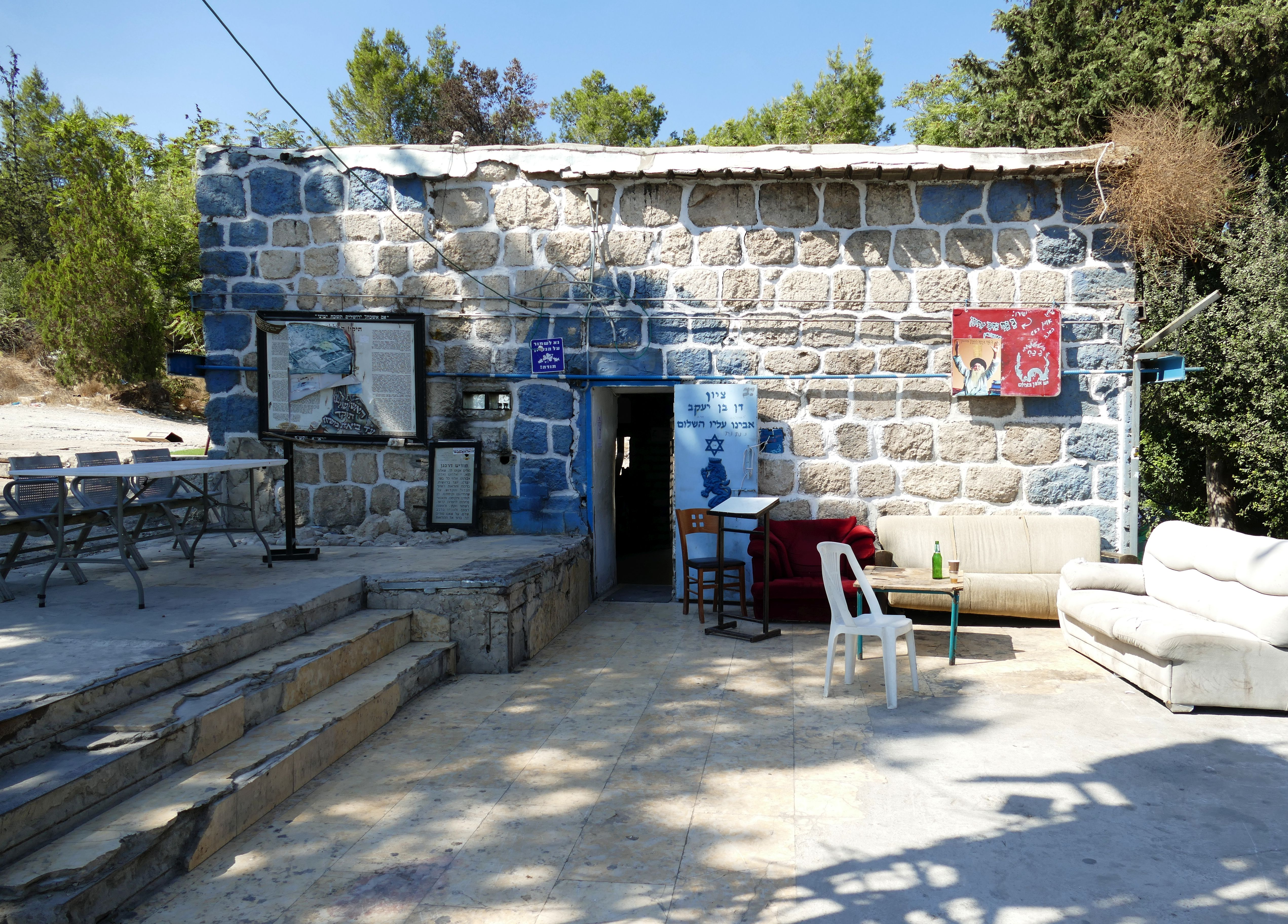
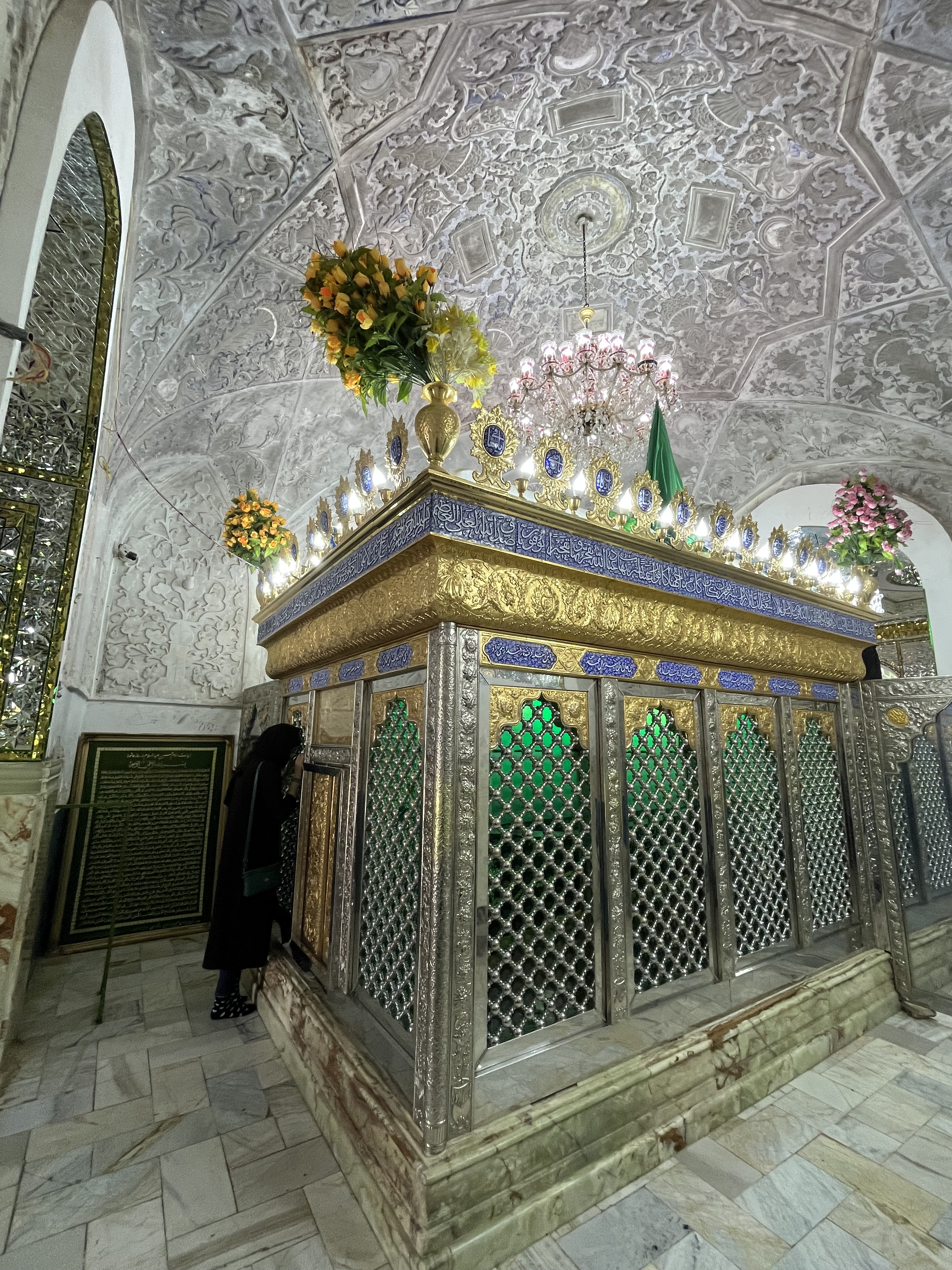
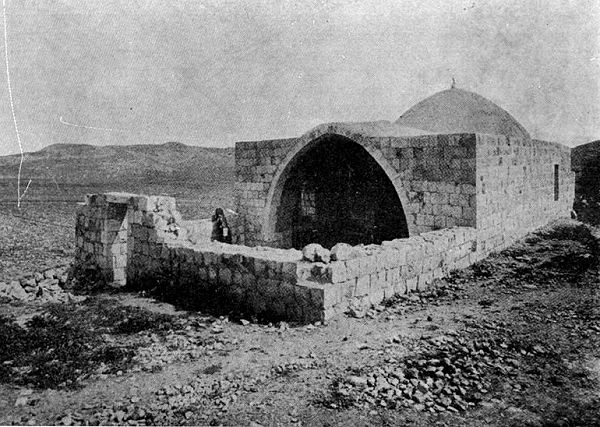
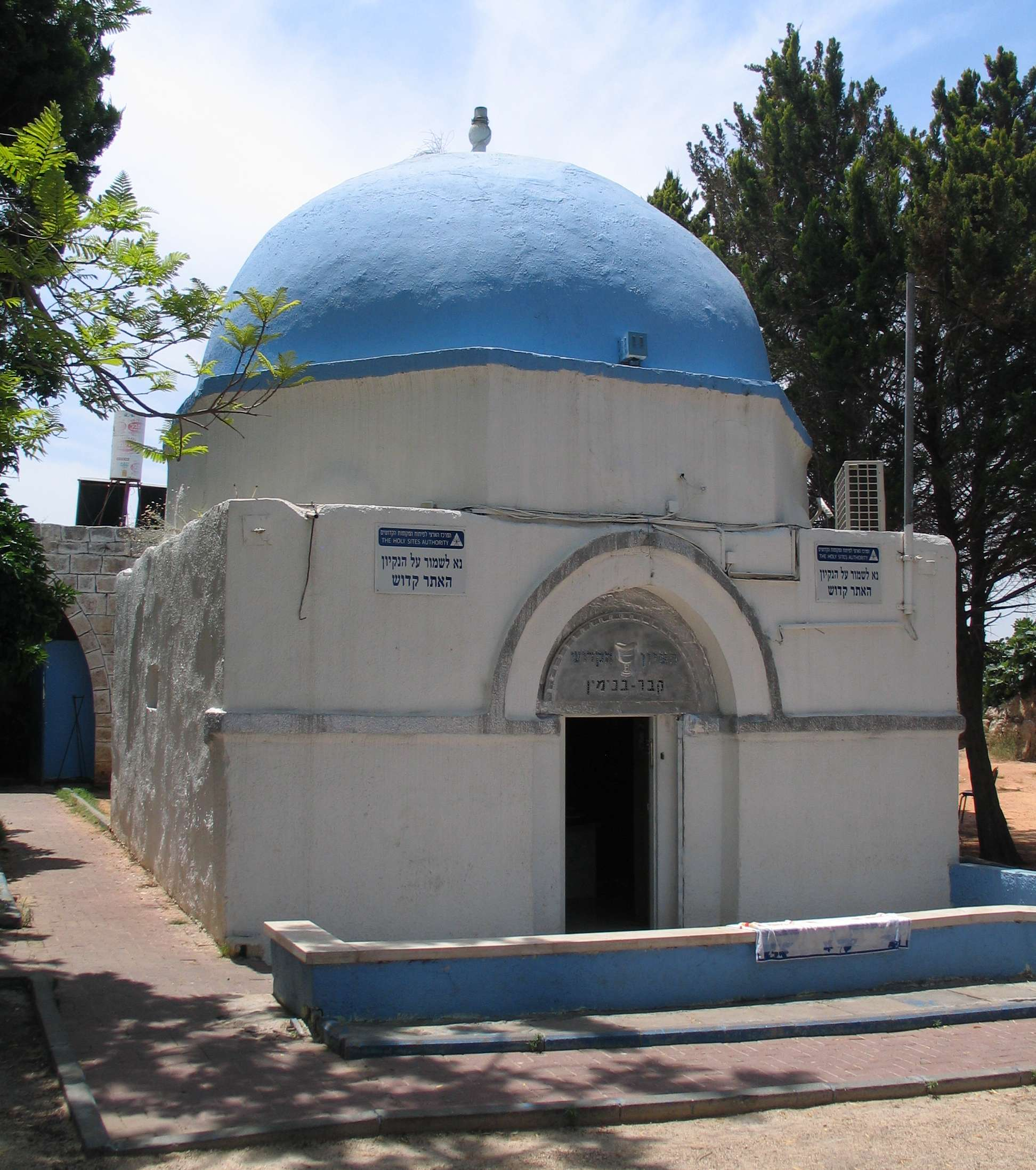
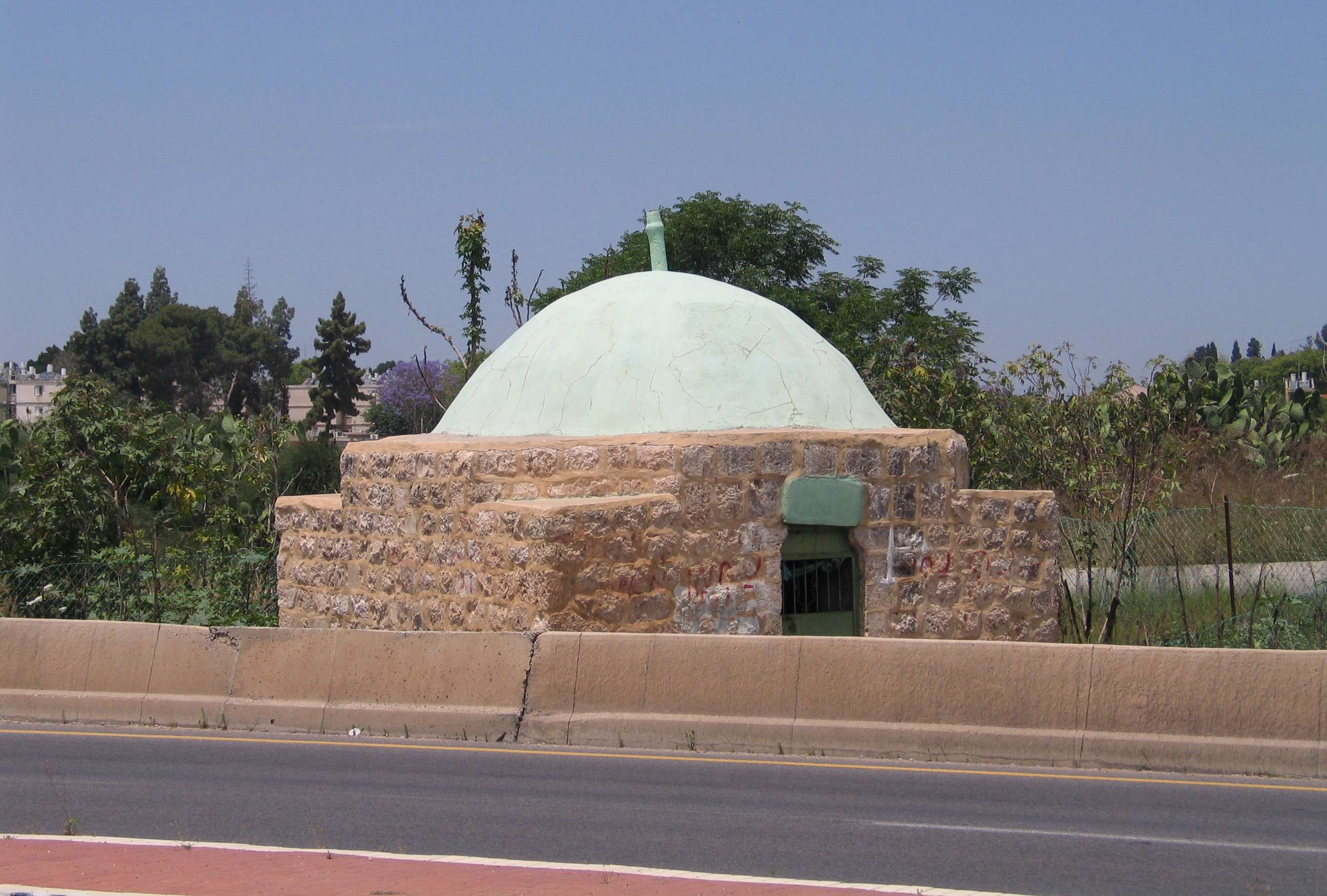
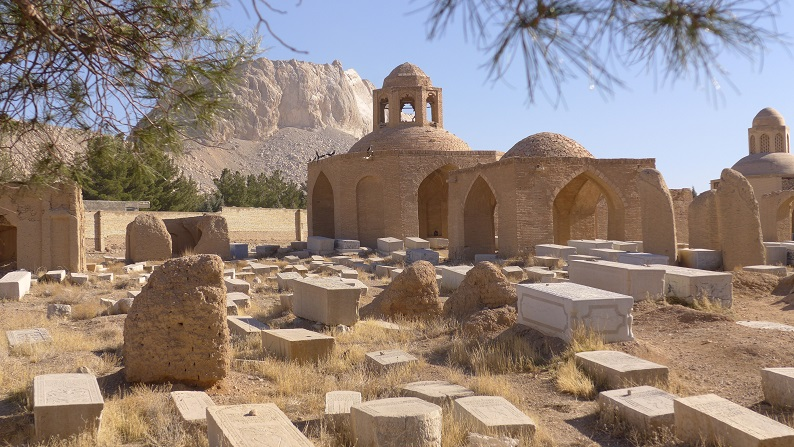
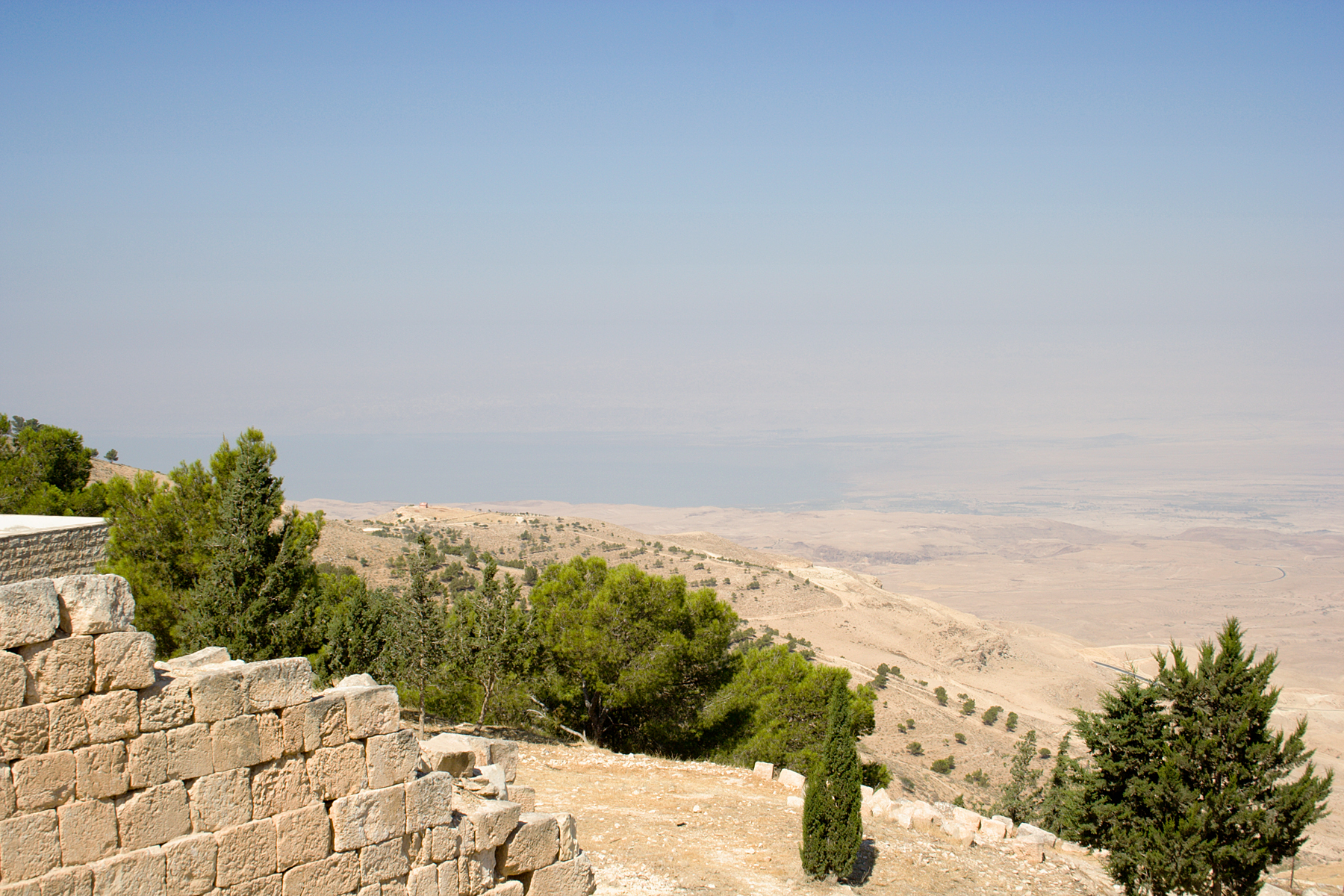
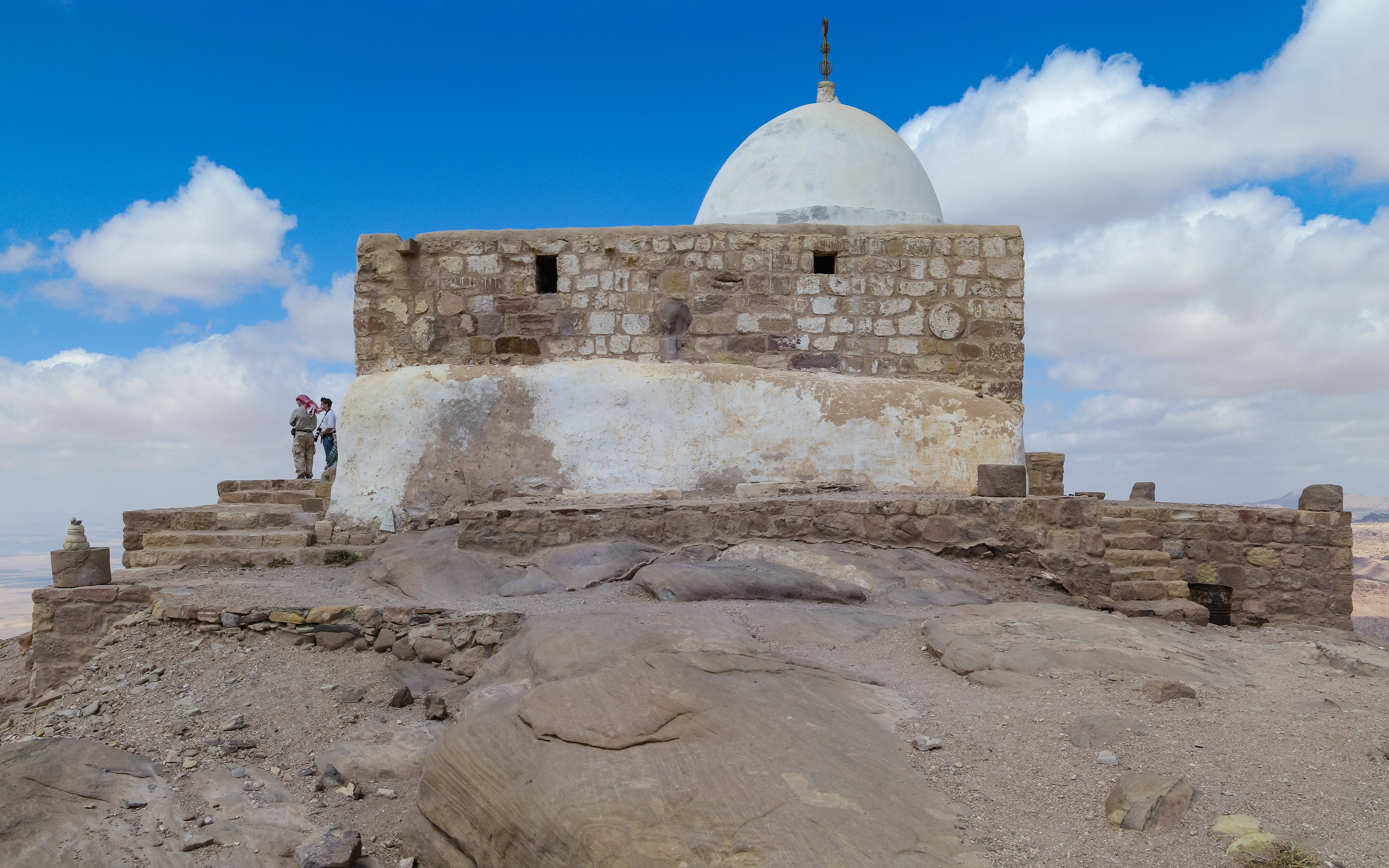
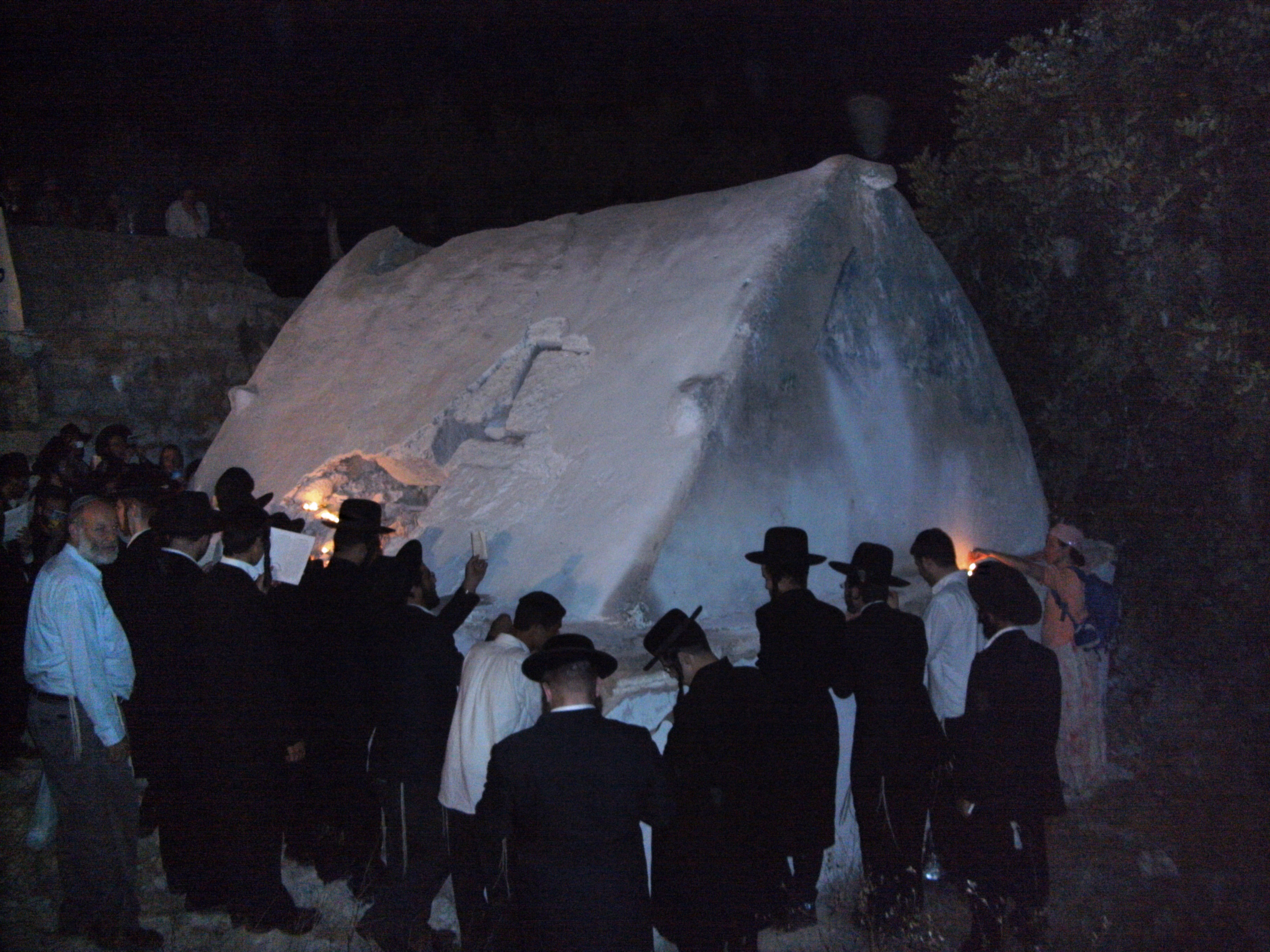
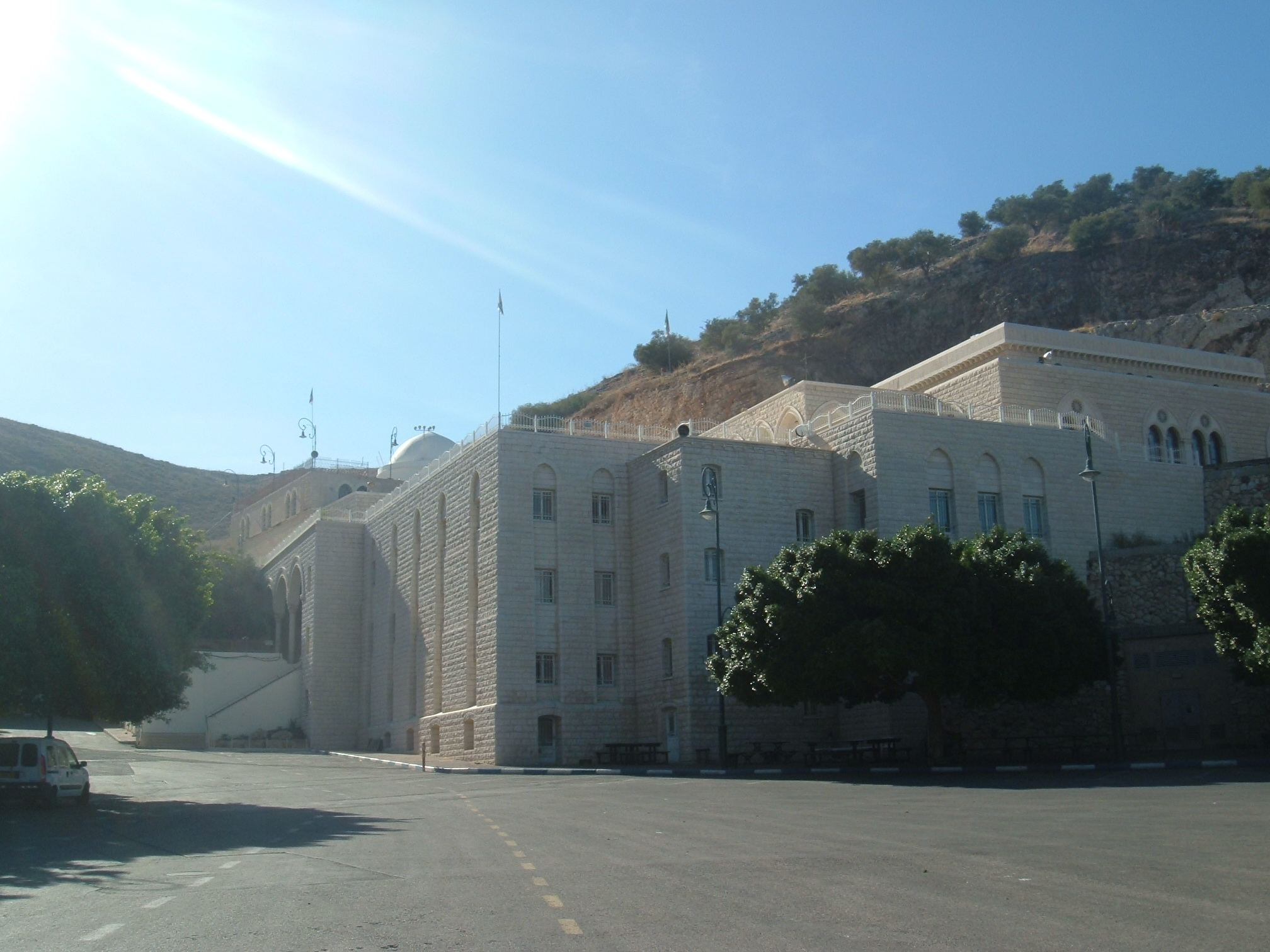
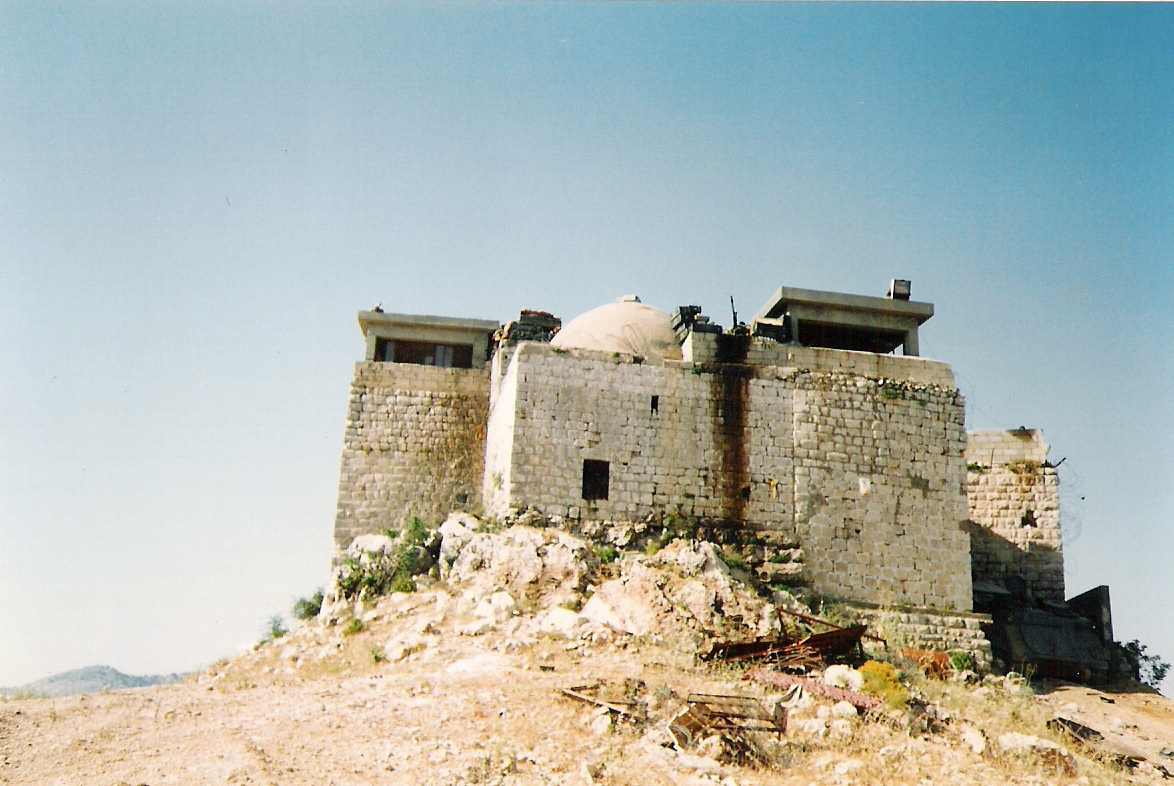
Biblical figure	Place name and location	Image	Notes
Adam	Judaism and Islam: Cave of the Patriarchs, Hebron, West Bank Shia Islam: Imam Ali Mosque, Najaf, Iraq Christianity: Chapel of Adam, Church of the Holy Sepulchre
Eve	Judaism and Christianity: Cave of the Patriarchs, Hebron, West Bank, Islam: Tomb of Eve, Jeddah, Saudi Arabia
Abel	Nabi Habeel Mosque, Zabadani Valley, Syria
Seth	In Judaism: Tiberias, Israel In Islam: Bashshit, Palestine (top), Al-Nabi Shayth, Lebanon, (bottom)
Lamech	Islam: Tomb of Lamech, Mihtarlam, Afghanistan	Seen here
Noah	There are several Islamic sites that are claimed to be the Tomb of Noah: Tomb of Noah, Nakhichevan, Azerbaijan. (top); Imam Ali Mosque (Shia Islam), Najaf, Iraq (second); Kerak, Jordan (third); Cizre, Turkey (bottom); Damavand, Iran; Karak Nuh, Lebanon; See also: Tomb of Noah
Abraham, Sarah, Isaac, Rebecca, Jacob, Esau, and Leah	Cave of the Patriarchs, Hebron, West Bank		According to Jewish and Christian tradition, only Esau's head is buried in the Cave of the Patriarchs. According to legends, Ishmael was buried here as well.
Ishmael and Hagar	Islam: Hajr Ismail, Mecca, Saudi Arabia
Lot	Islam: Bani Na'im, near Hebron, West Bank
Rachel	Rachel's Tomb, outside Bethlehem, West Bank
Zilpah, Bilhah Jochebed, Zipporah, and Elisheva	Tomb of the Matriarchs, Tiberias, Israel
Reuben	Nabi Rubin, Palmachim, Israel		During the Ottoman period, Arabs would gather each year at the Mamluk-era structure. Nowadays, infrequent Jewish visitors come to pray at the site.
Judah	Yehud, Israel
Simeon	Kibbutz Eyal, Israel.
Asher and Naphtali	Tel Kedesh near Malkia, Israel	Seen here.
Gad	Prophet Jadur Shrine, Ain Al-Jadur, west of Salt, Jordan		The current mosque, built around the tomb, is a modern structure, which dates back to the year 1958. The site has fallen into disrepair and had even been looted as well.
Dan	Beit Shemesh, Israel
Qedar	Mausoleum of Prophet Qeydar, Zanjan, Iran		Qedar, the son of Ishmael, is believed by the Shi'ites to have been buried in Zanjan. The current mausoleum is a 14th-century reconstruction that has been renovated a few times.
Zebulun	Tomb of Zebulun, Sidon, Lebanon	Seen here	Currently a Shi'ite shrine which is still locked to the public. In the past, towards the end of Iyyar, Jews from the most distant parts of Palestine and the Jews who lived in Lebanon would make a pilgrimage to this tomb.
Joseph, Ephraim, and Manasseh	Judaism and Christianity: Joseph's Tomb, Nablus (Shechem), West Bank; Islam: Cave of the Patriarchs, Hebron, West Bank,		Some others consider Joseph to have been buried next to the Cave of the Patriarchs, where a mediaeval structure known as the kalah (castle) is now located. Some archaeologists believe that the site in Nablus is only the tomb of a Sufi Muslim Shaykh named Yusuf, and not Joseph himself.
Benjamin	Kfar Saba, Israel		Two structures 30 m away from each other (both pictured) are each claimed by Jews, Muslims and Christians as the authentic tomb. This site is questionable, however, because it is not located in the territory of the Tribe of Benjamin.
Serah	Pir-i Bakran, near Esfahan, Iran
Moses	Mount Nebo (Jordan) Islam: Nabi Musa, West Bank,		According to the Bible, the exact place of Moses' grave remains unknown, in order to impede idolatry.
Aaron	Tomb of Aaron: Mount Harun near Petra, Jordan.		At 1350 meters above sea-level, it is the highest peak in the area; it is believed to be the place where Aaron died and was buried. A 14th-century mosque stands here with its white dome visible from most areas in and around Petra.
Eleazar and Ithamar	Awarta, West Bank		Due to the uncertain security situation, the Israel Defense Forces limits visits by Jews to one annual night close to the 5th of Shevat on the Hebrew calendar (around January–February).
Jethro	Nabi Shu'ayb, Hittin		Each year on April 25, the Druze gather at the site to discuss community affairs.
Aholiab	Sujod, Southern Lebanon		Located at 33.4428°N 35.5381°E. Destroyed after the Israeli occupation of Southern Lebanon.

== Figures mentioned in the Nevi'im (Prophets) ==
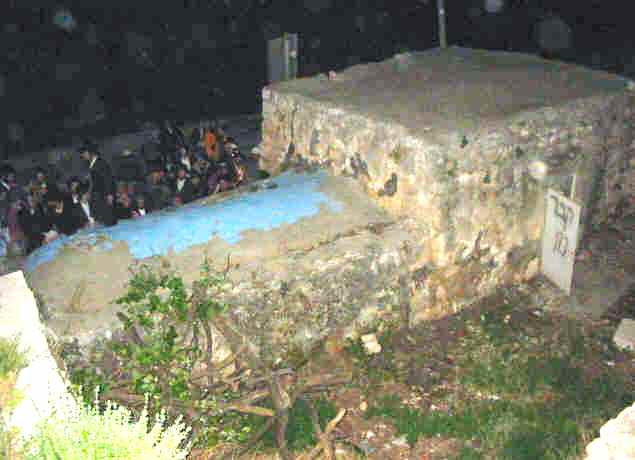
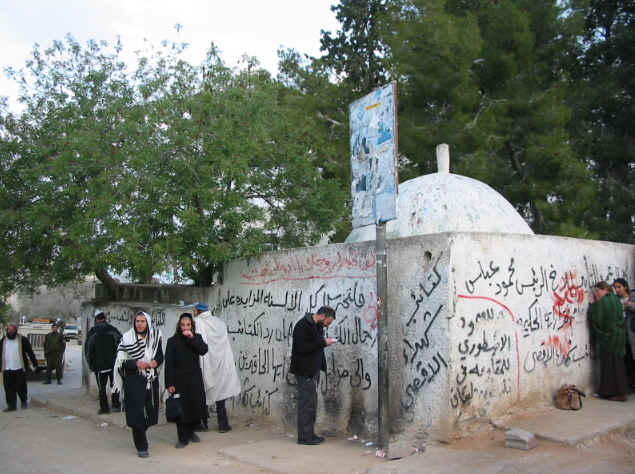
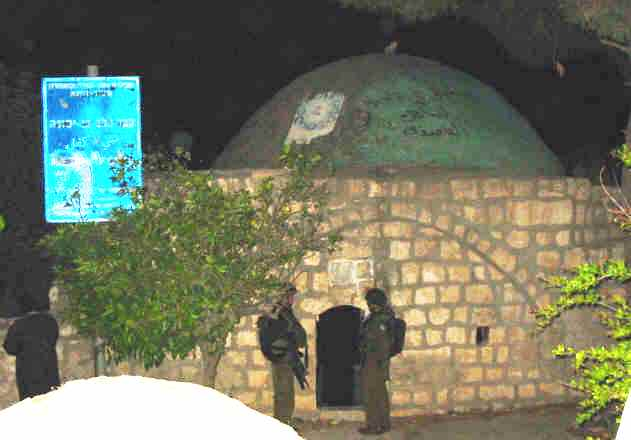
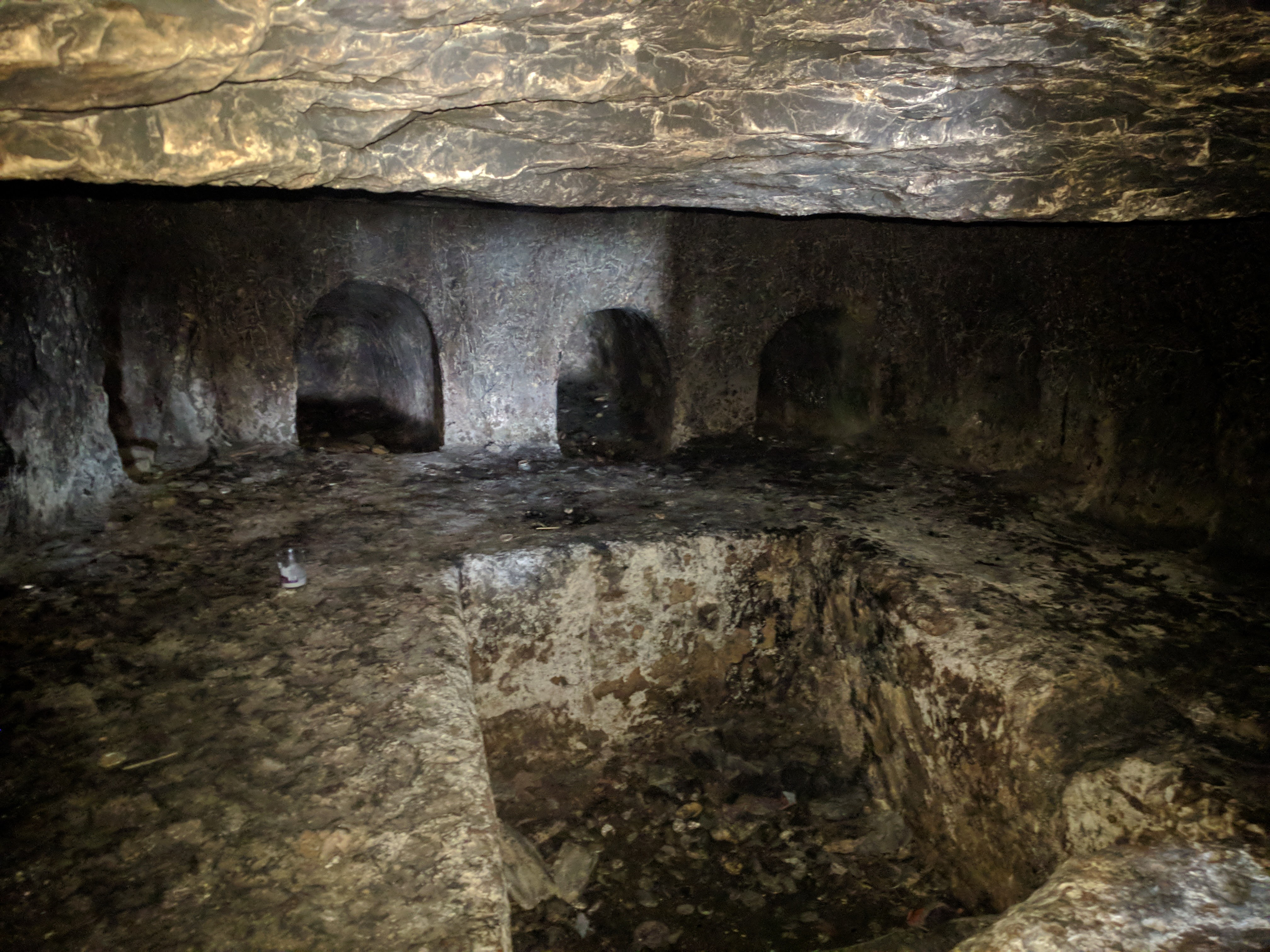
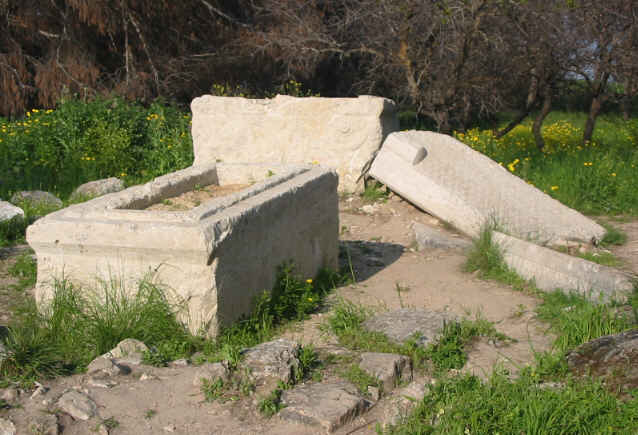
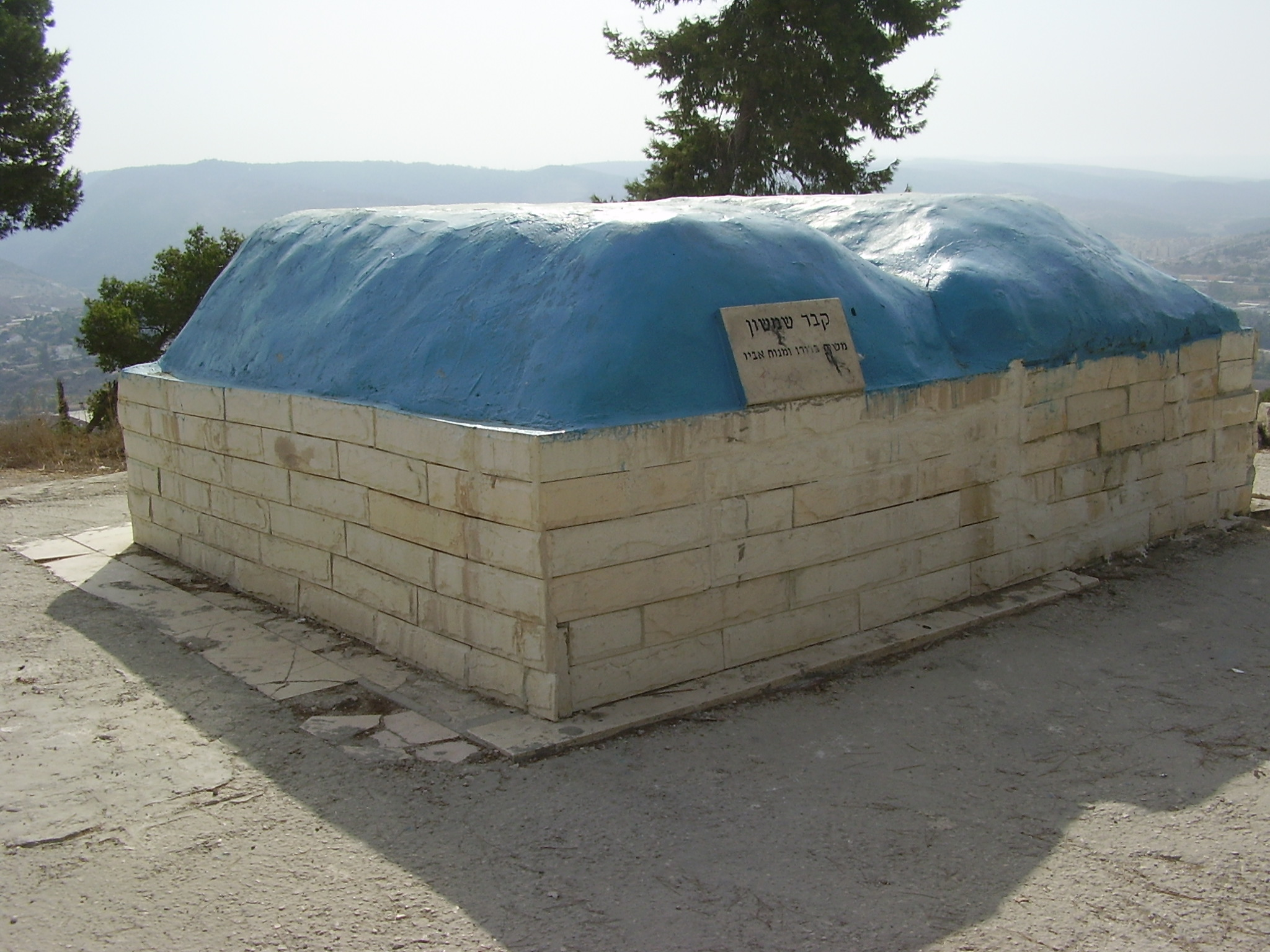
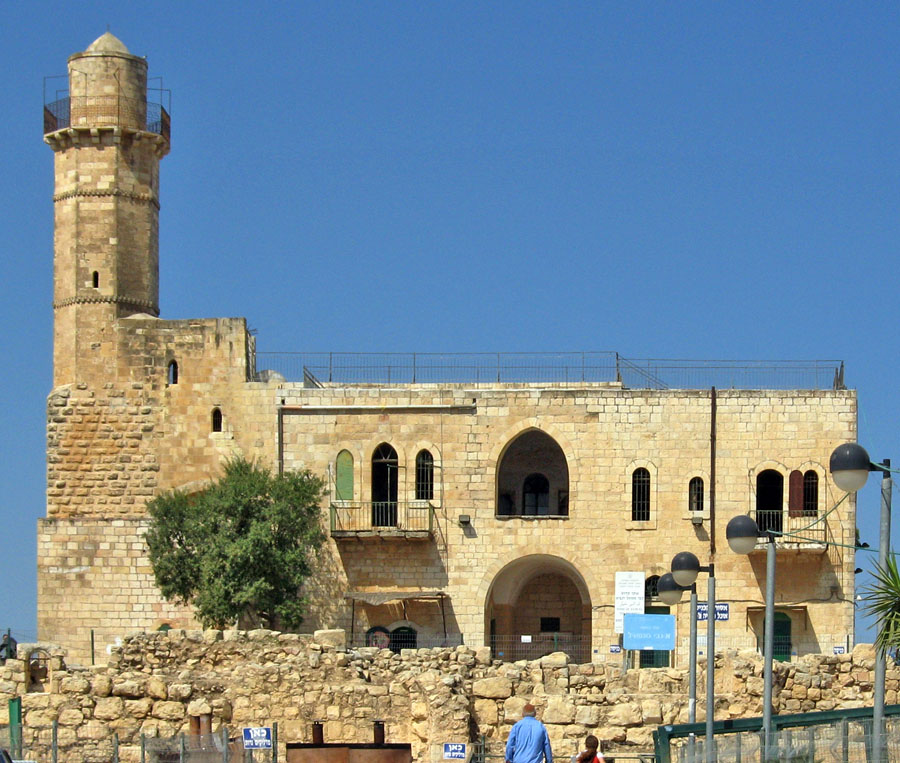
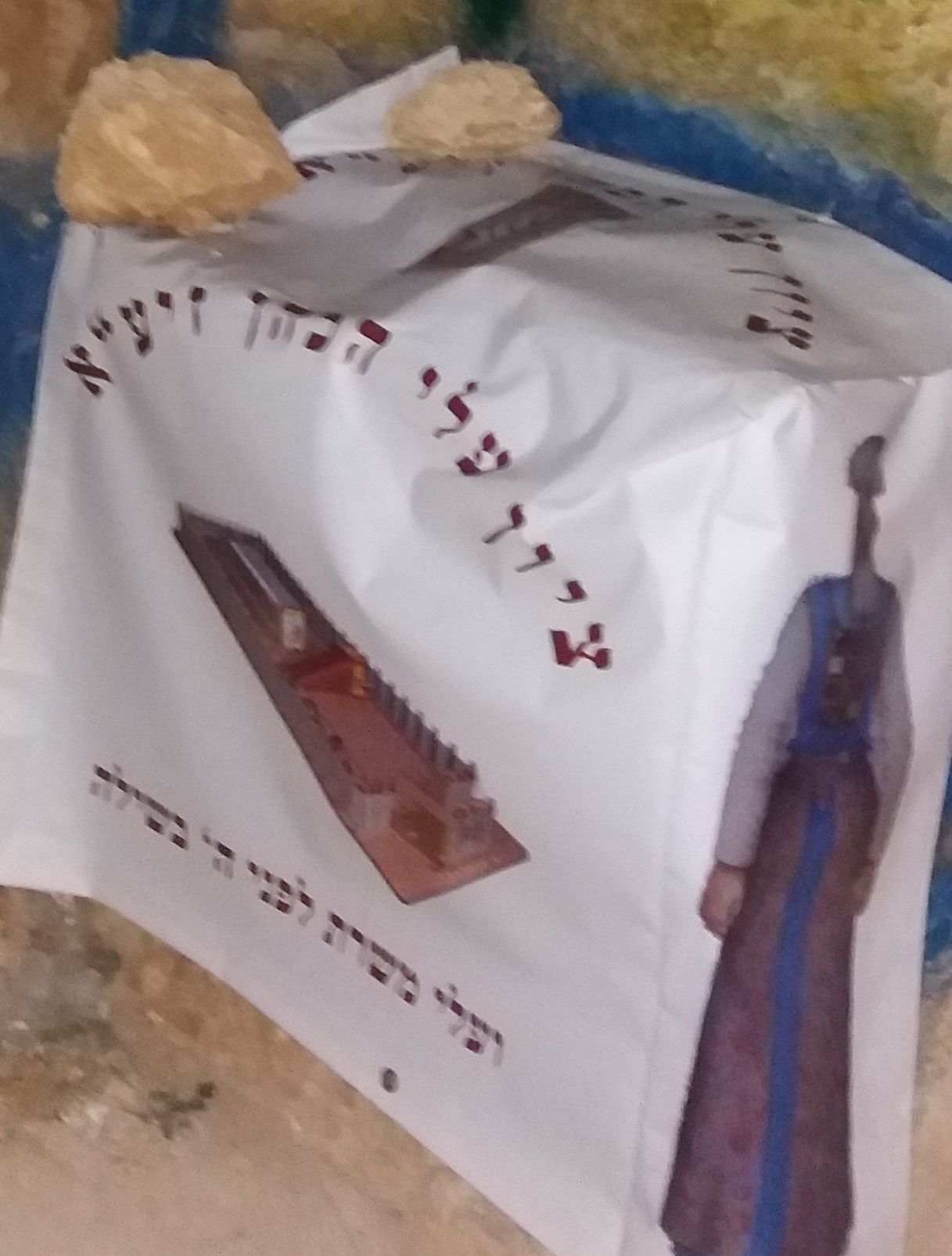
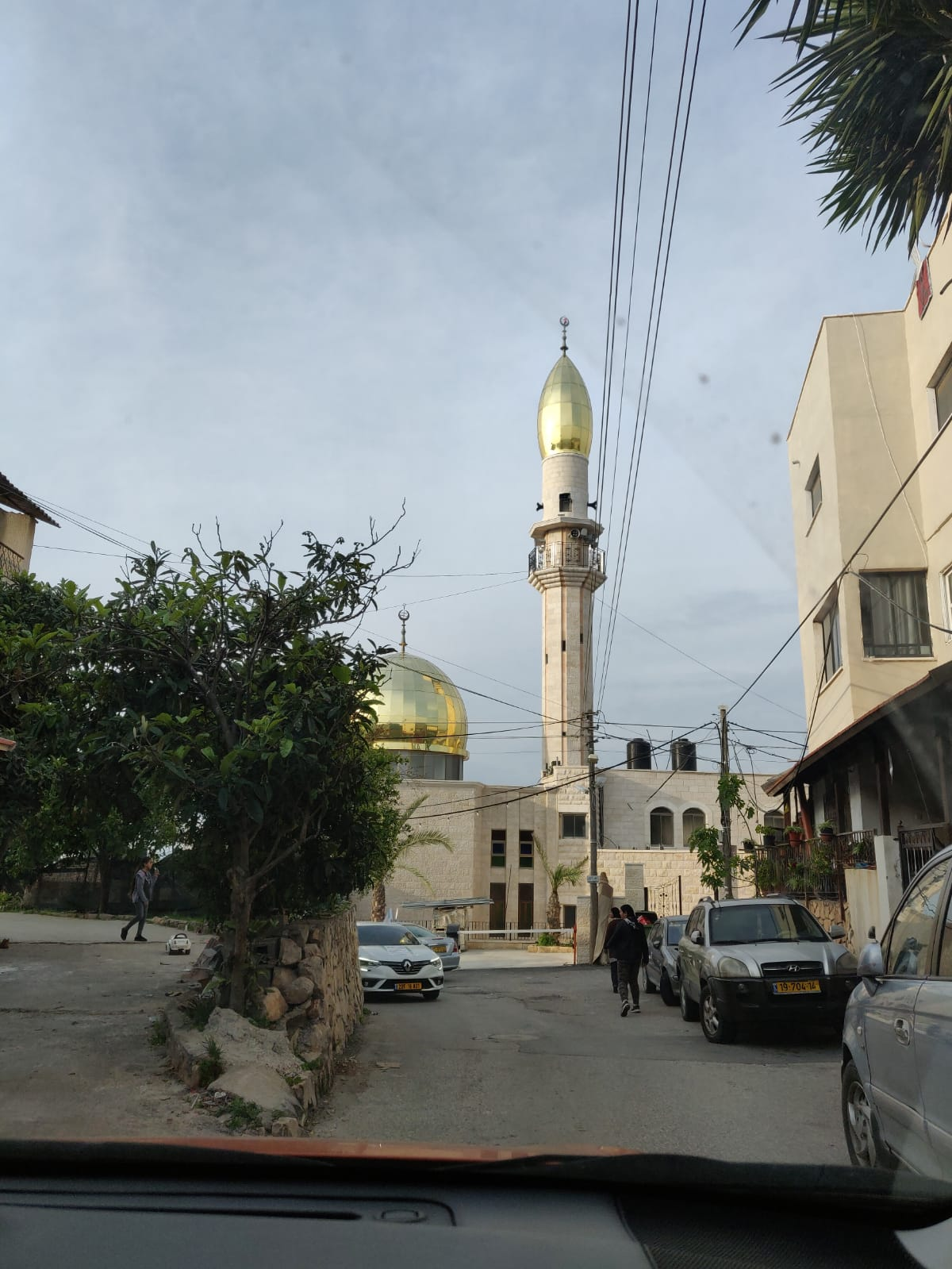
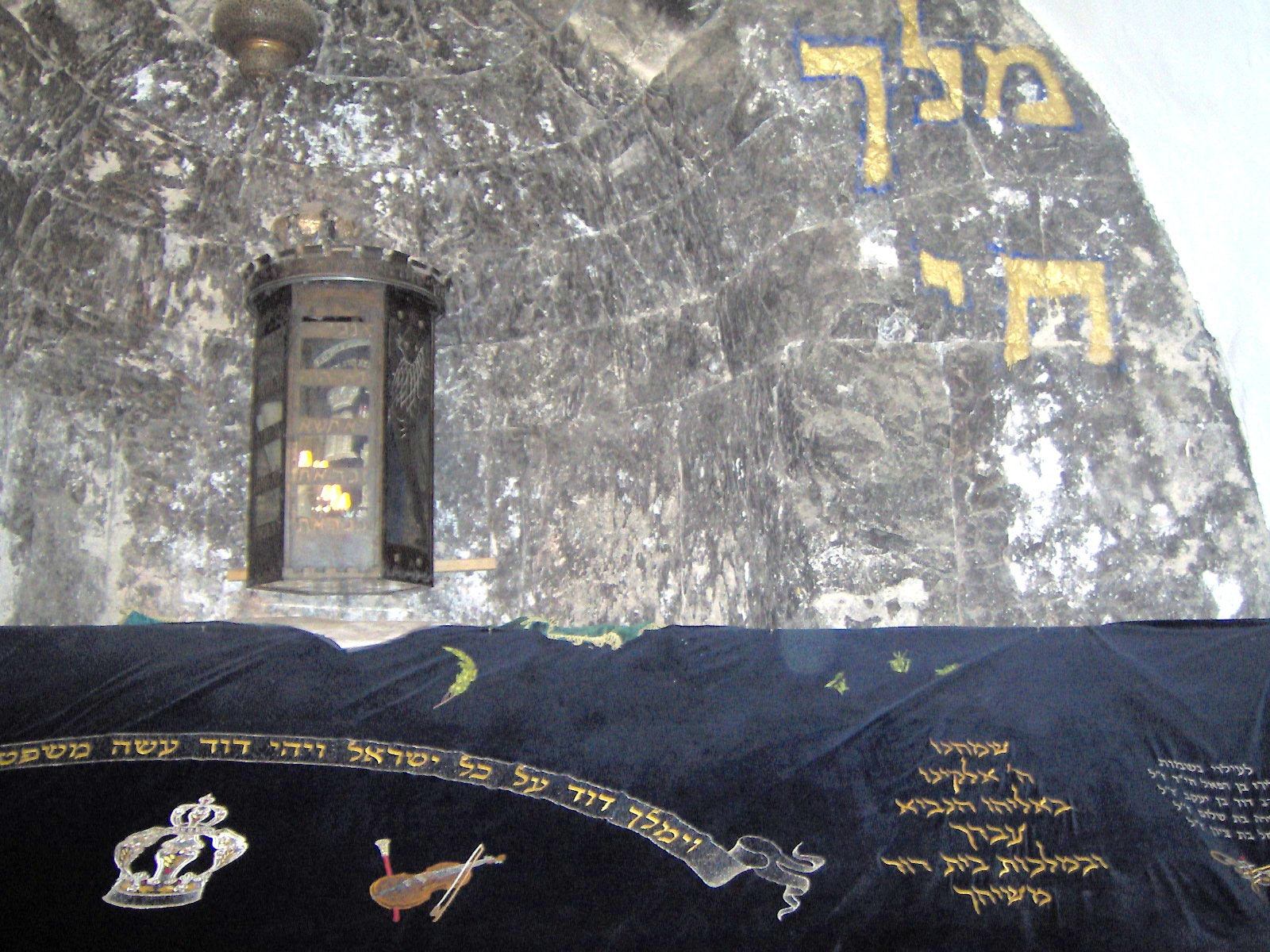
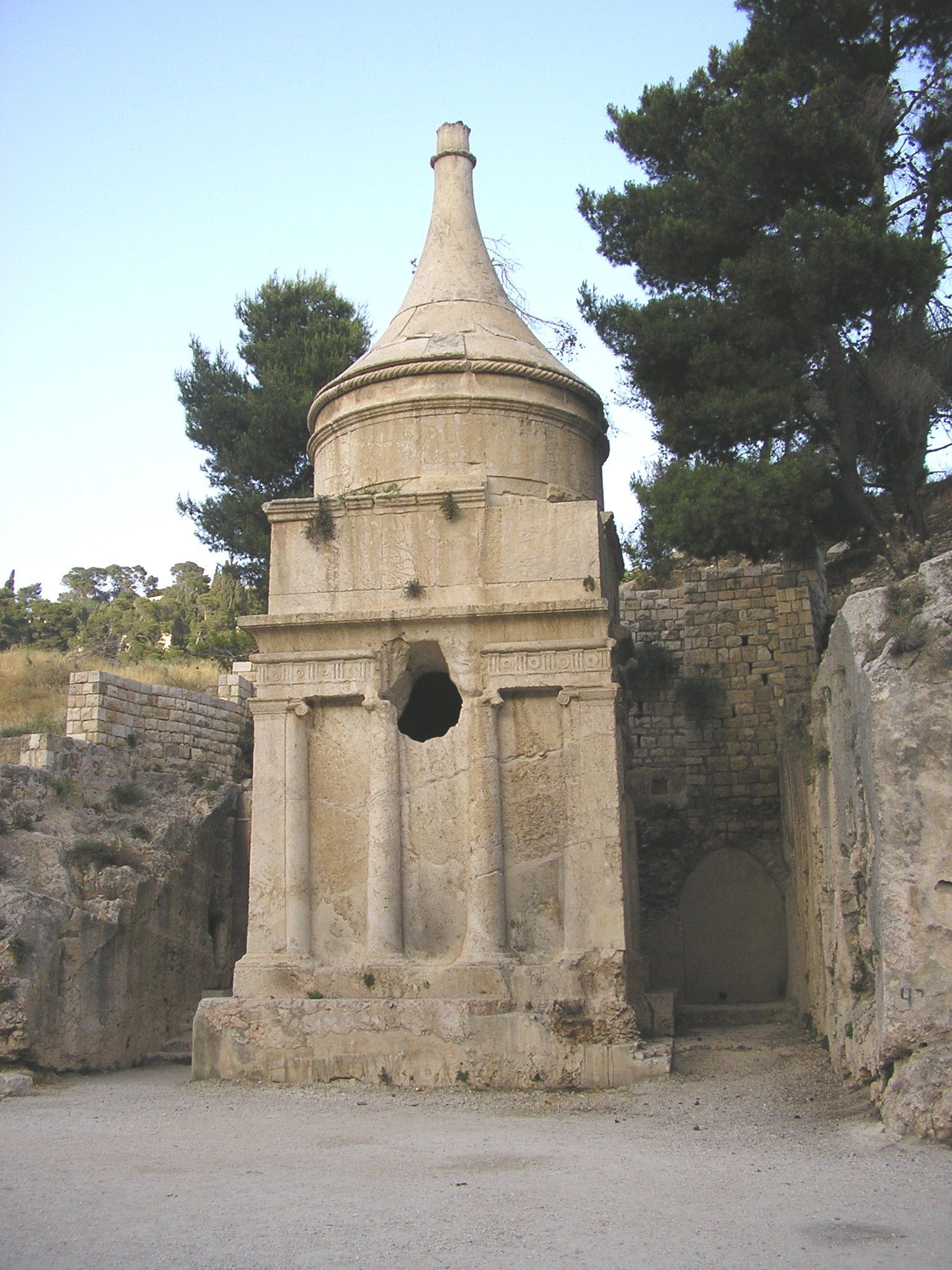
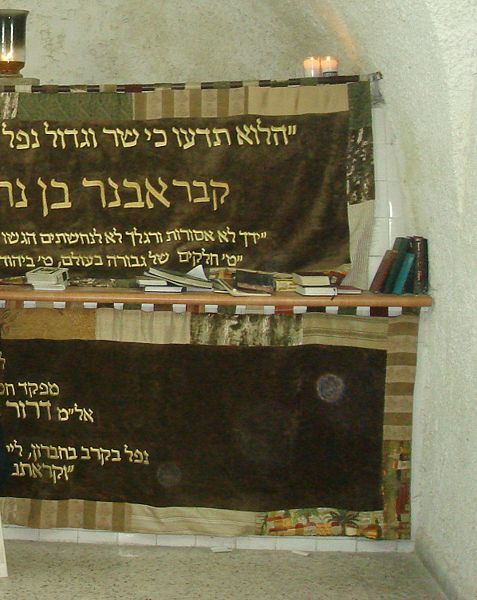
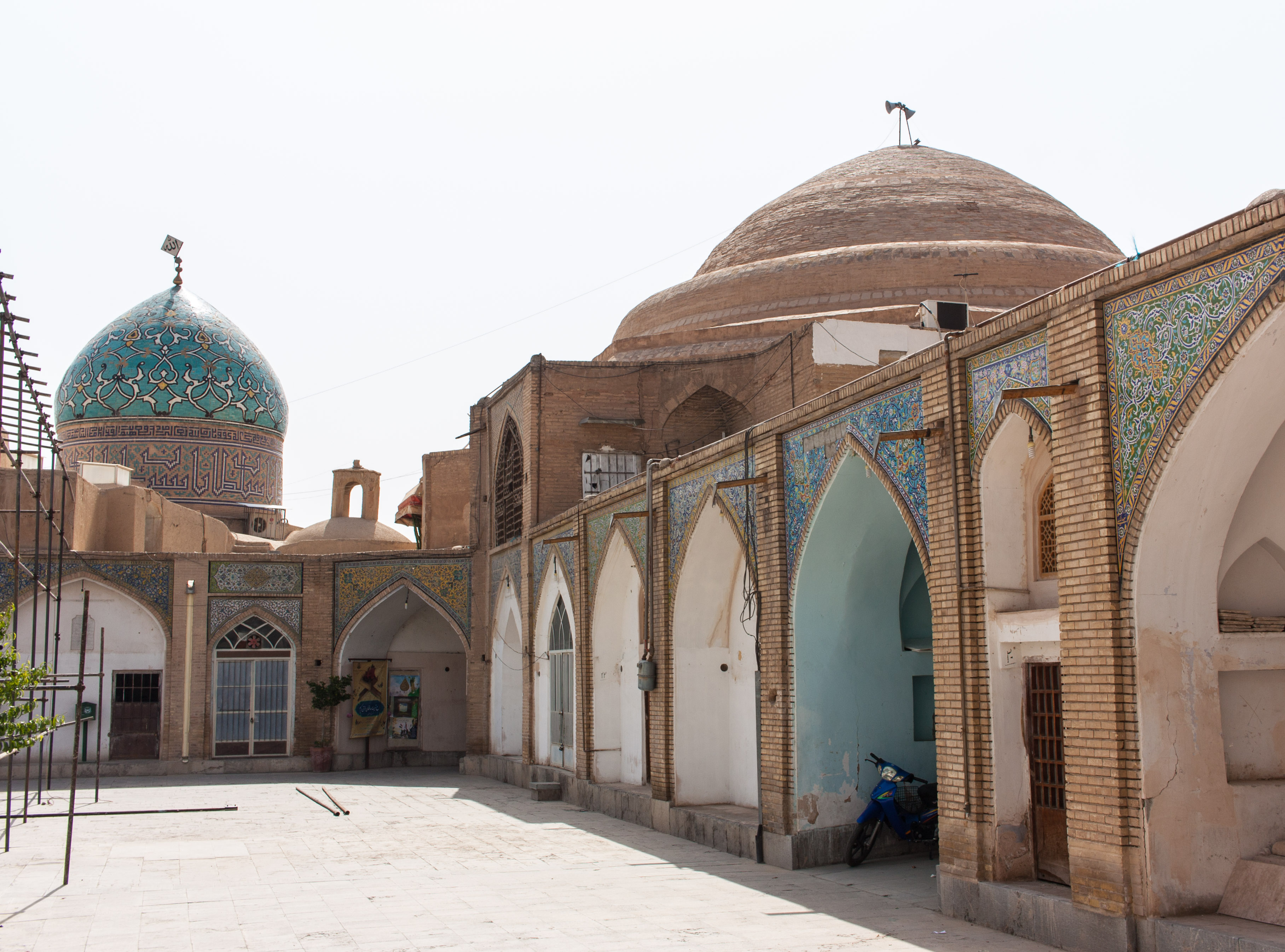
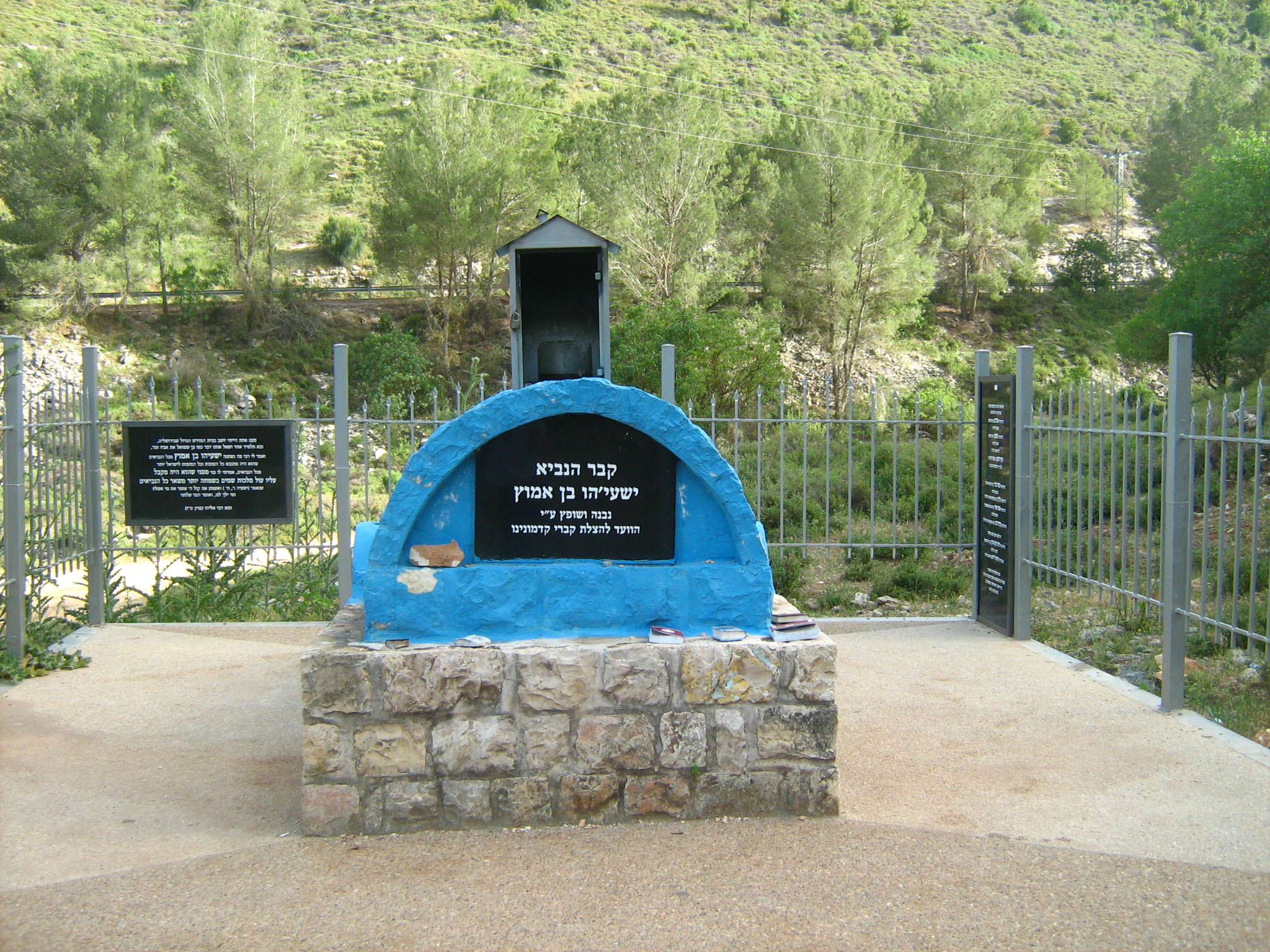
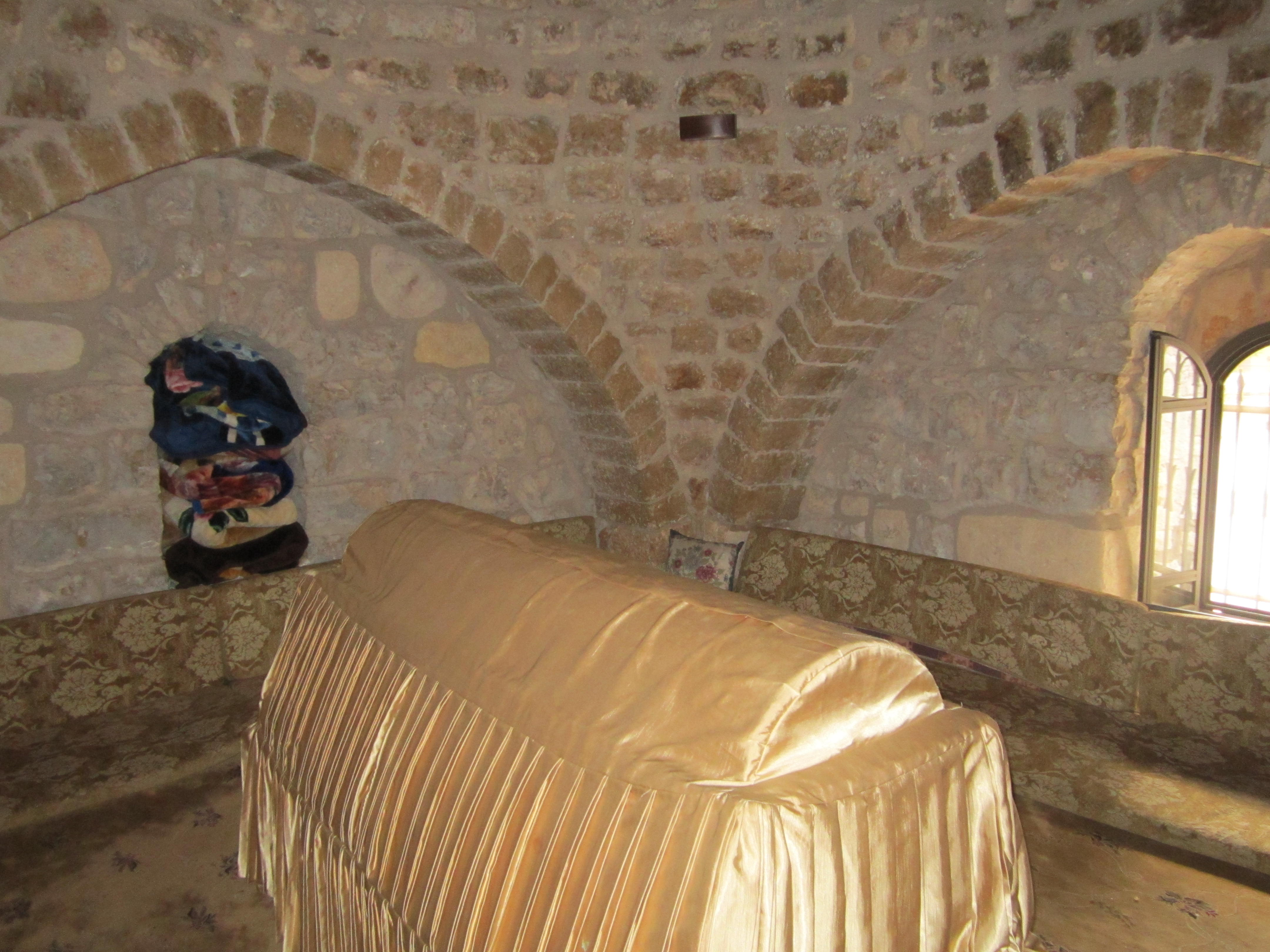
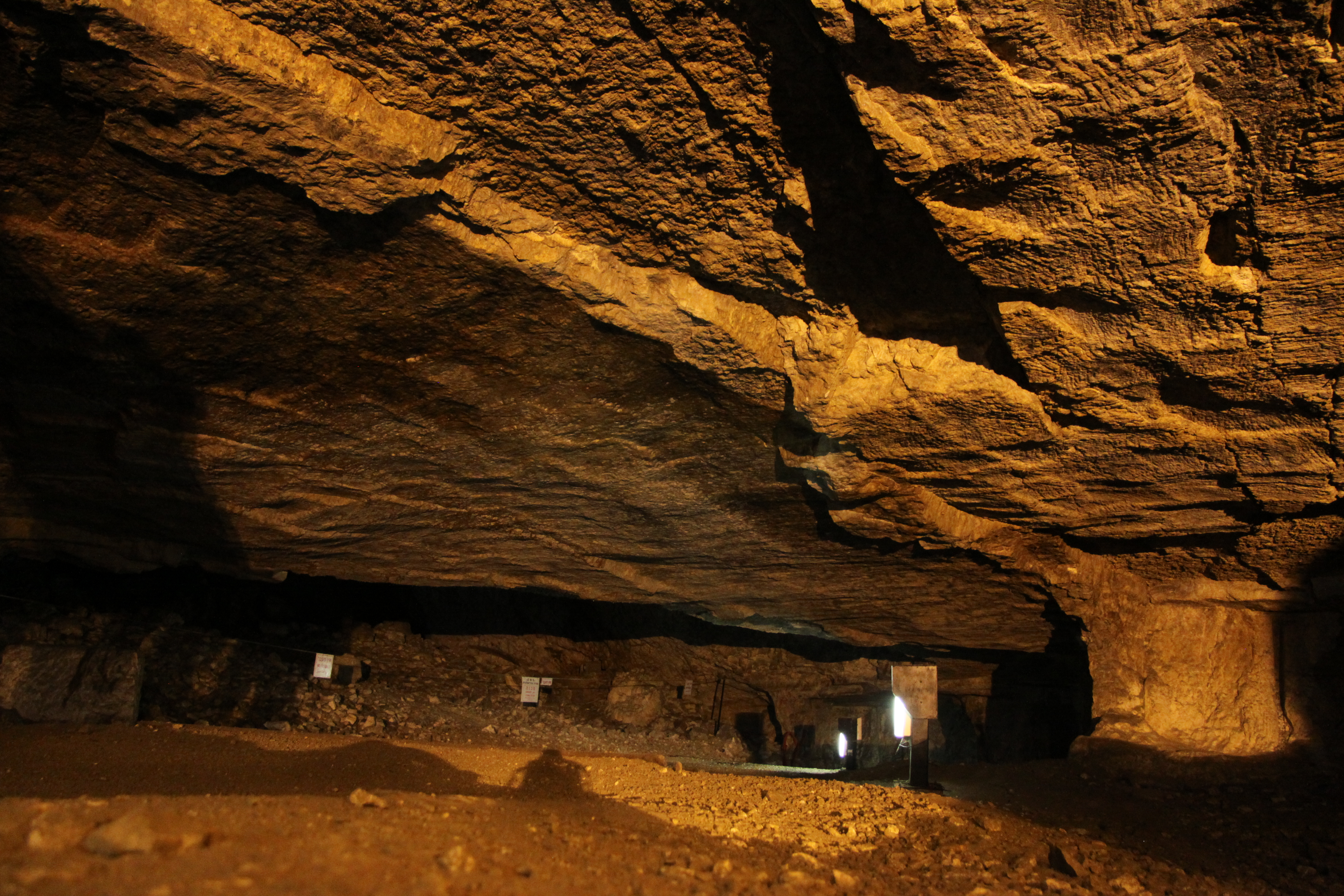
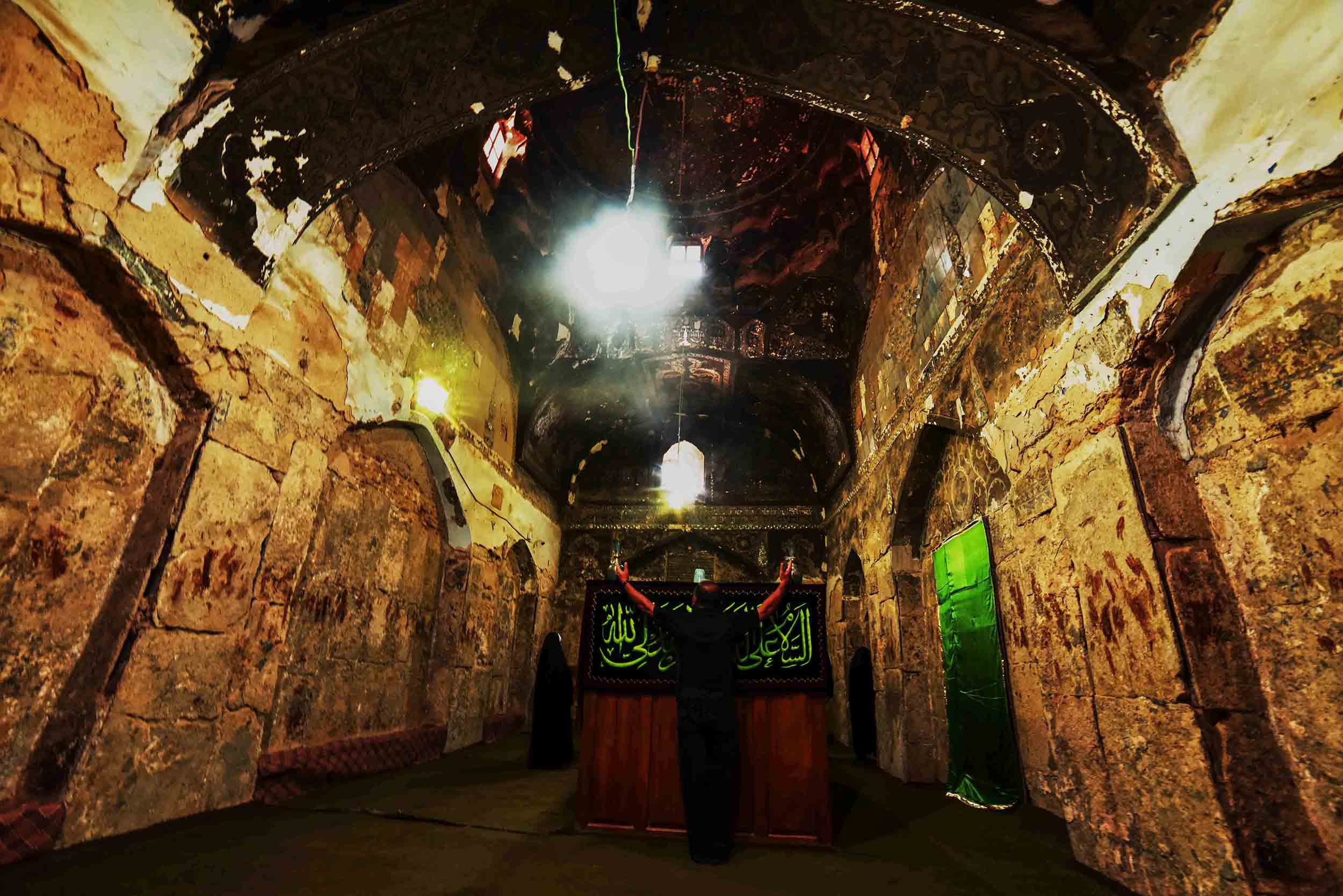
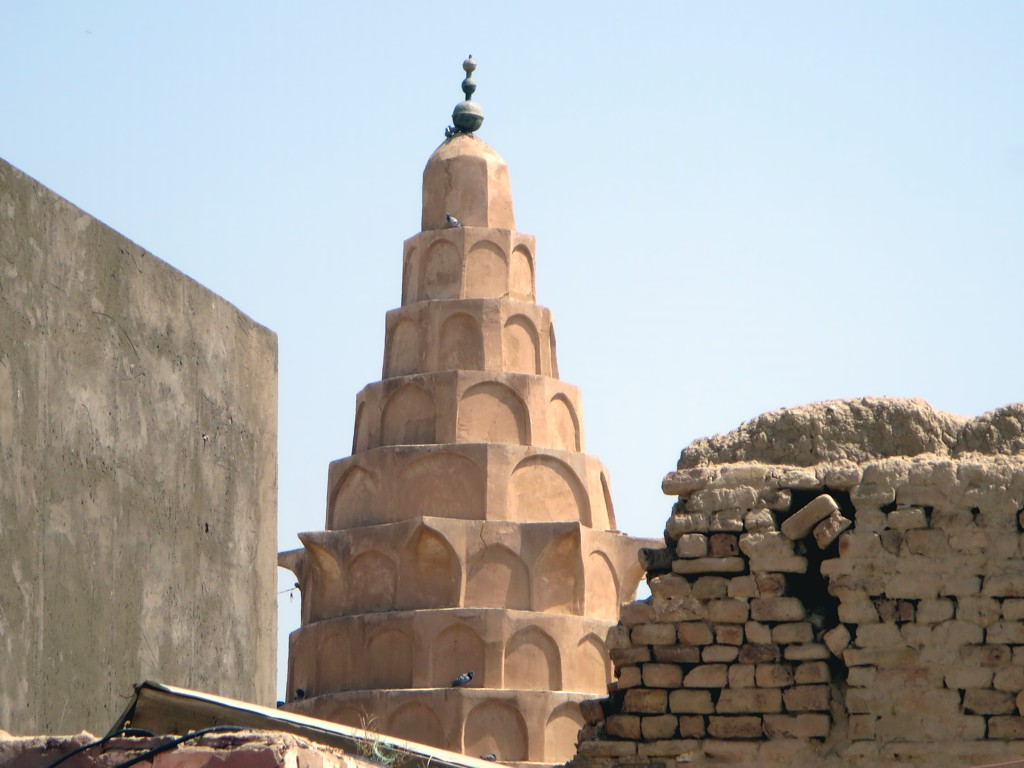
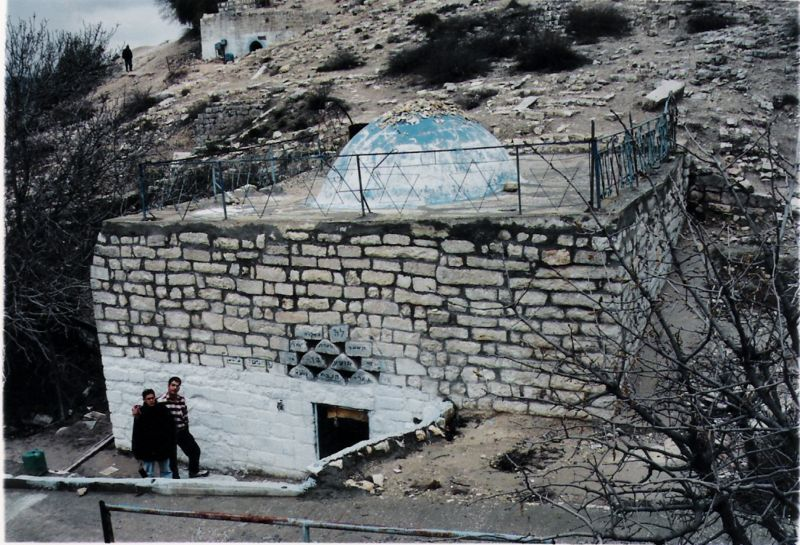
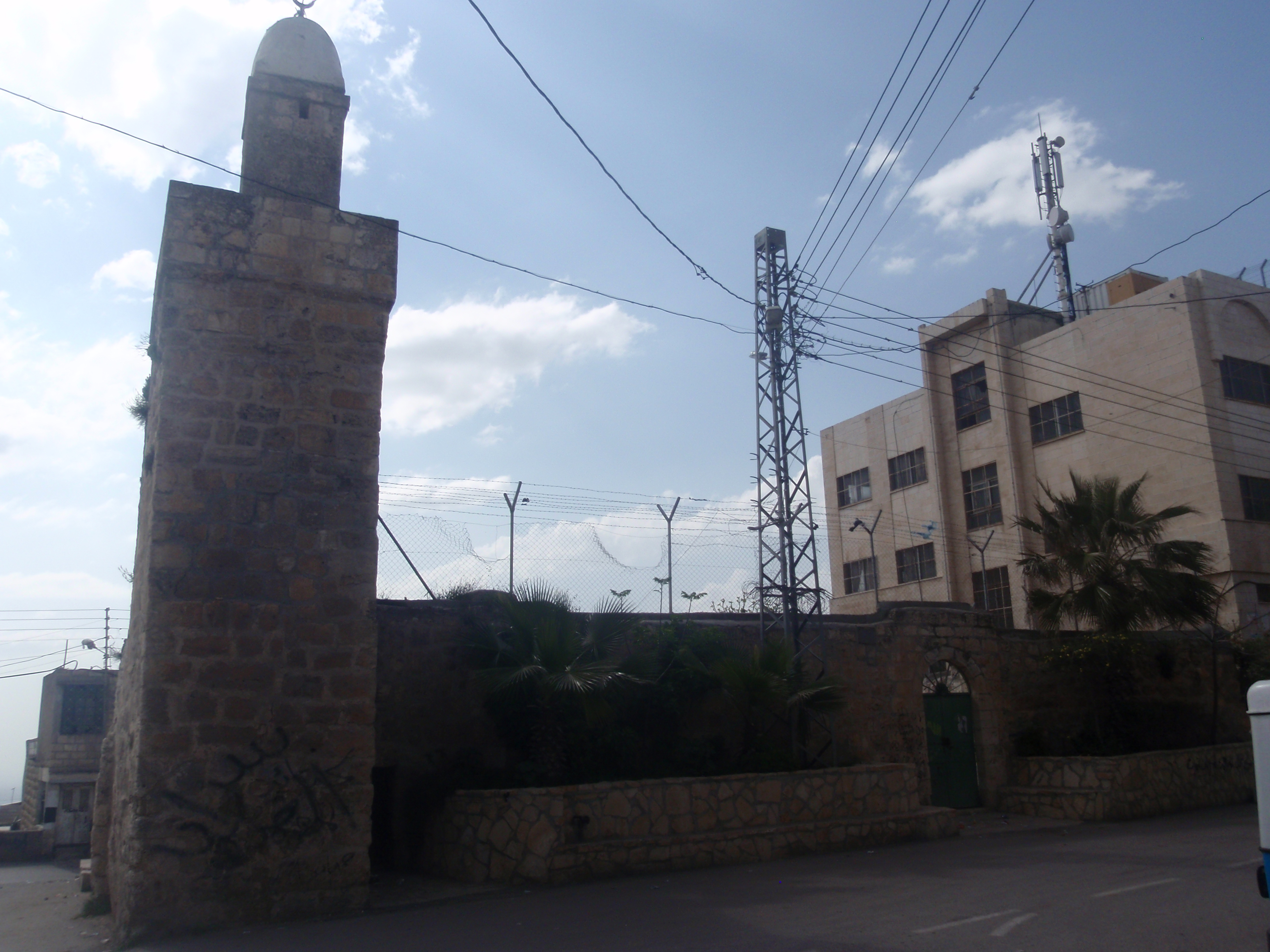
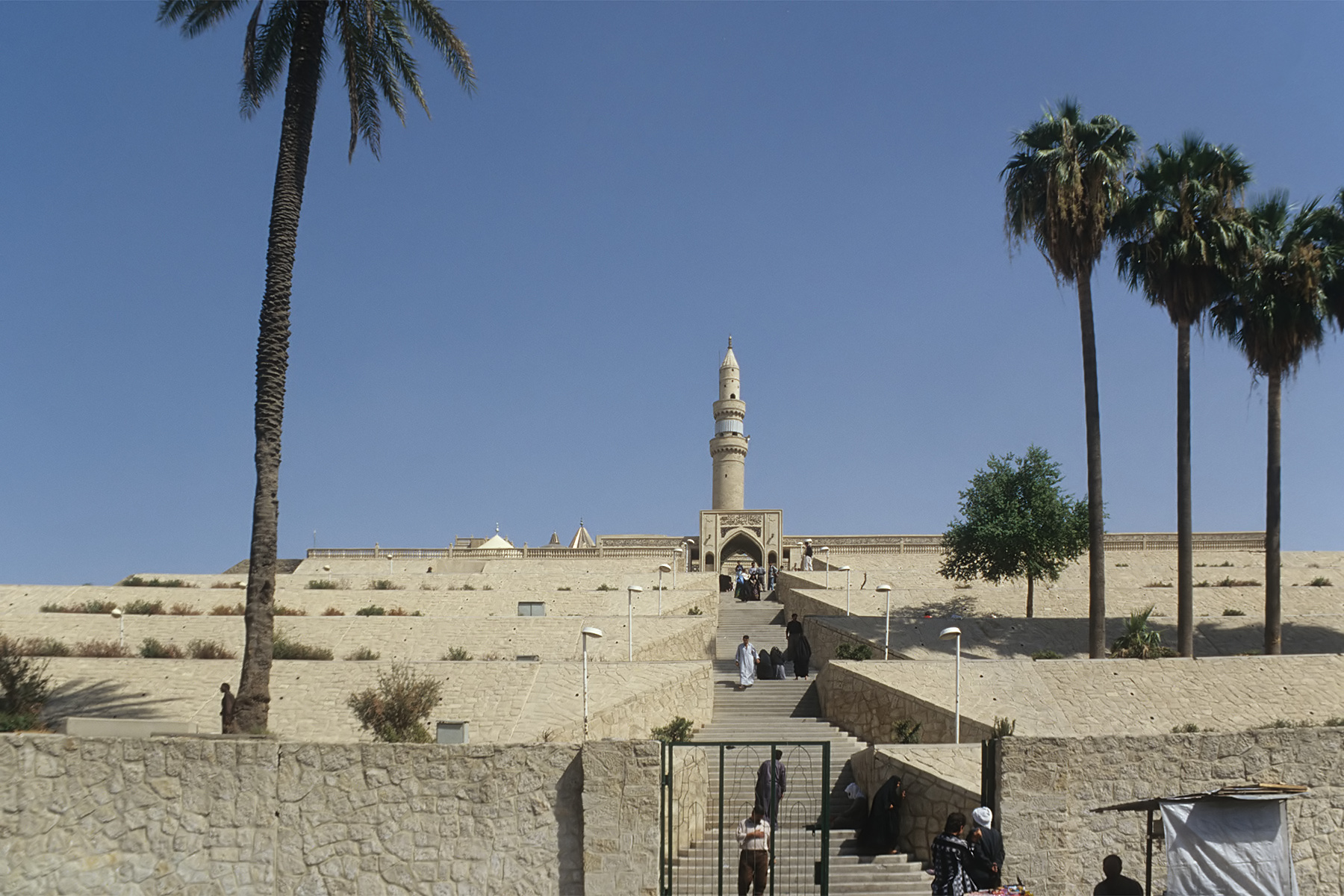
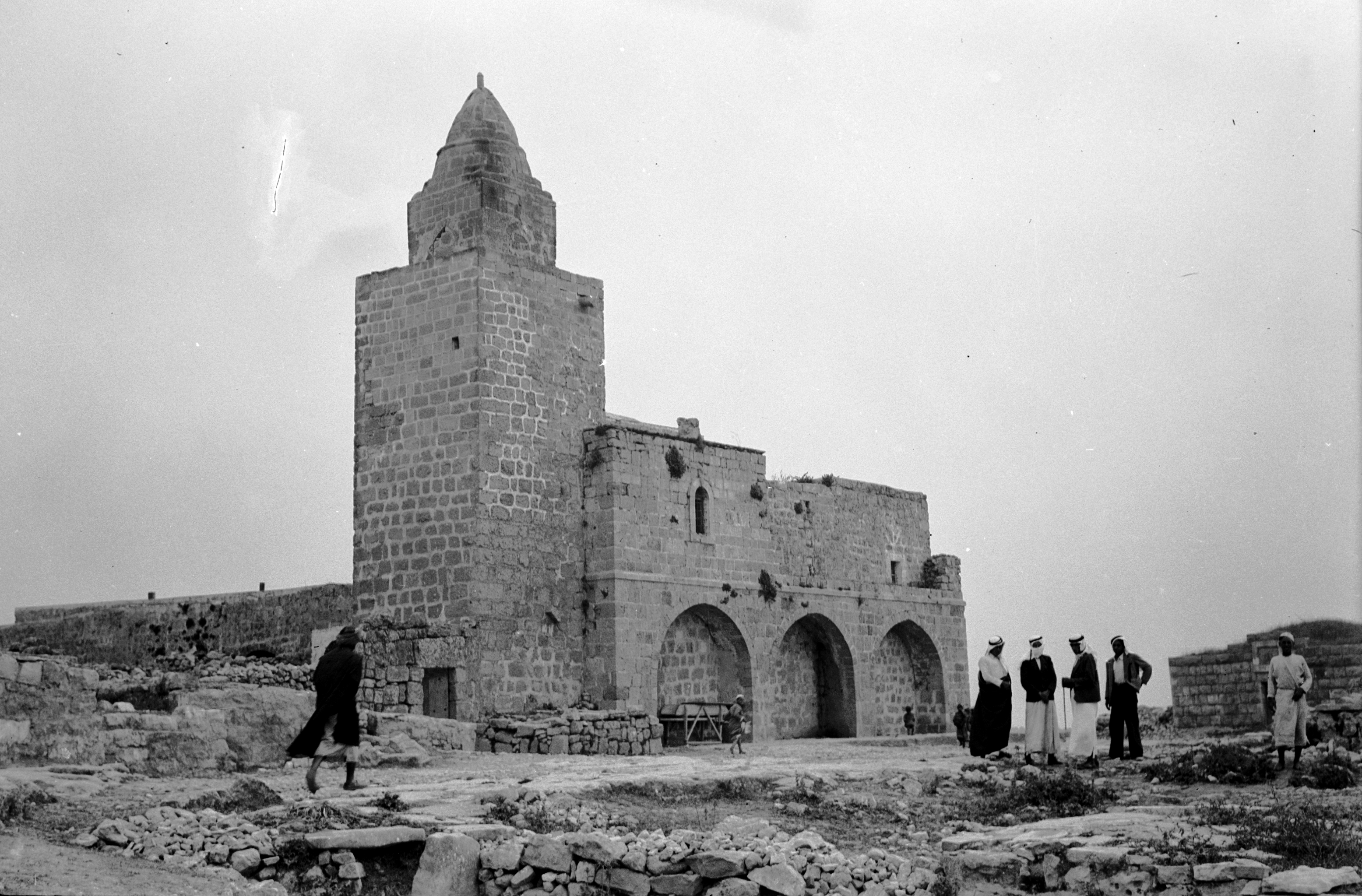
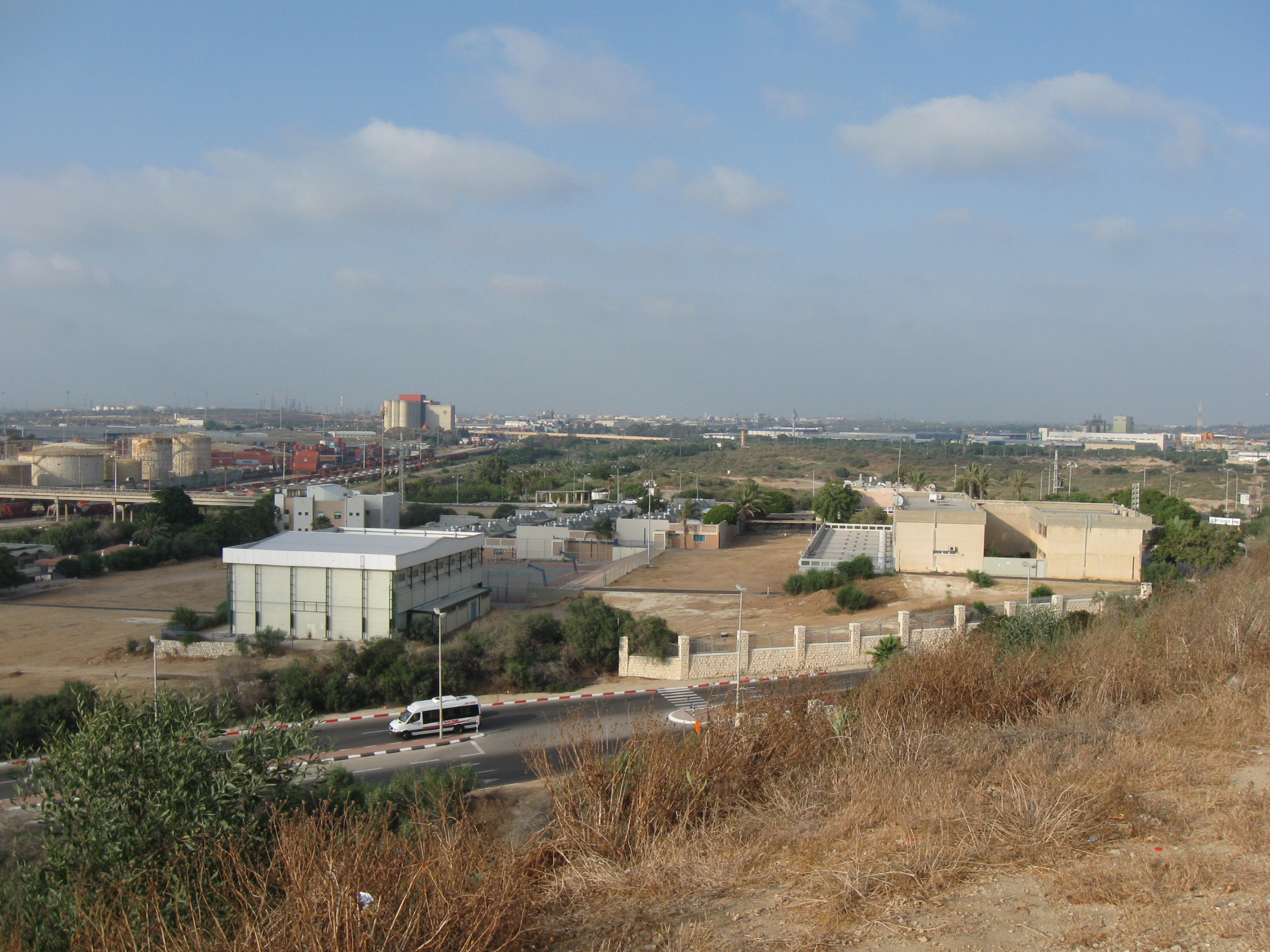
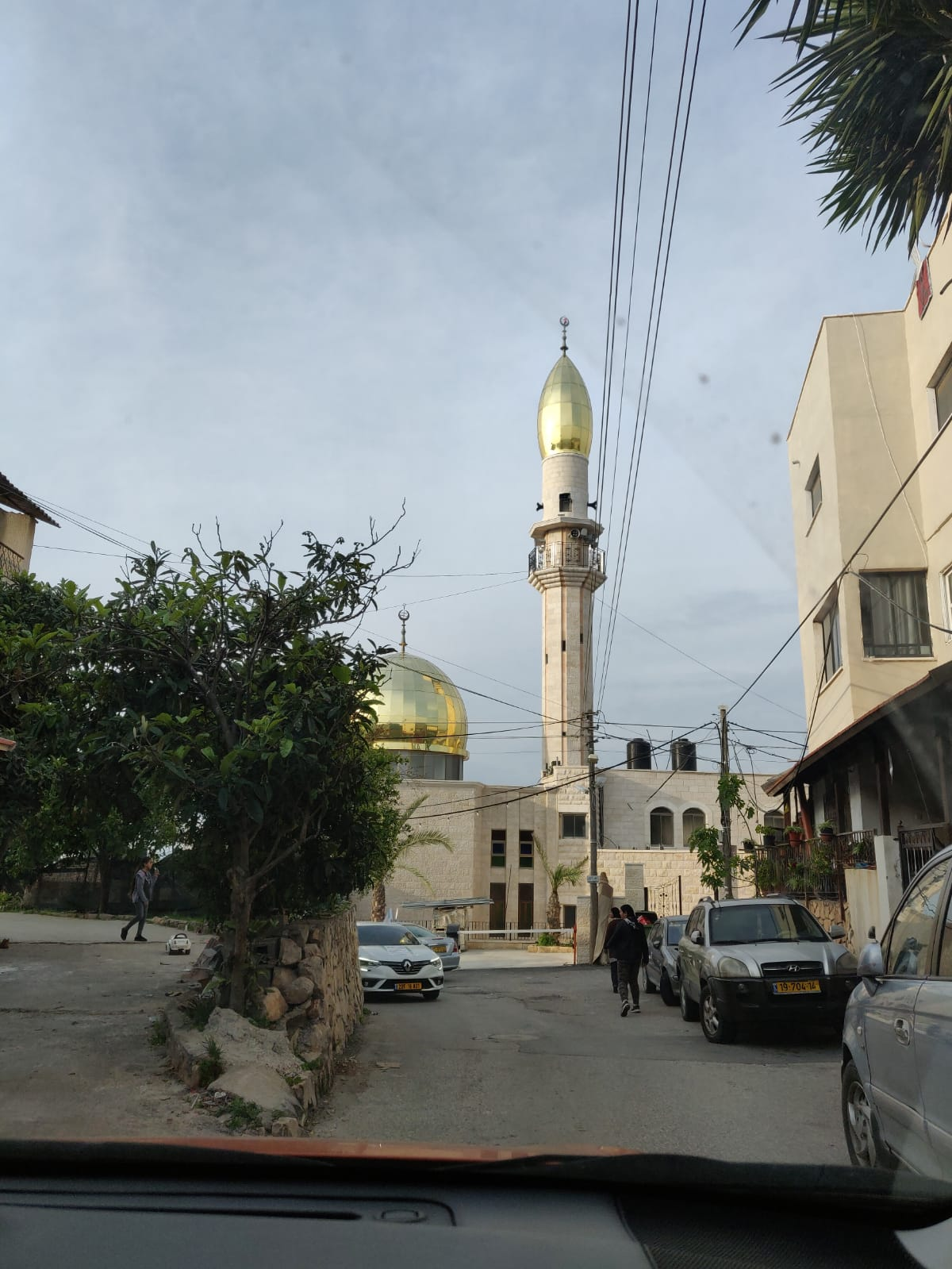
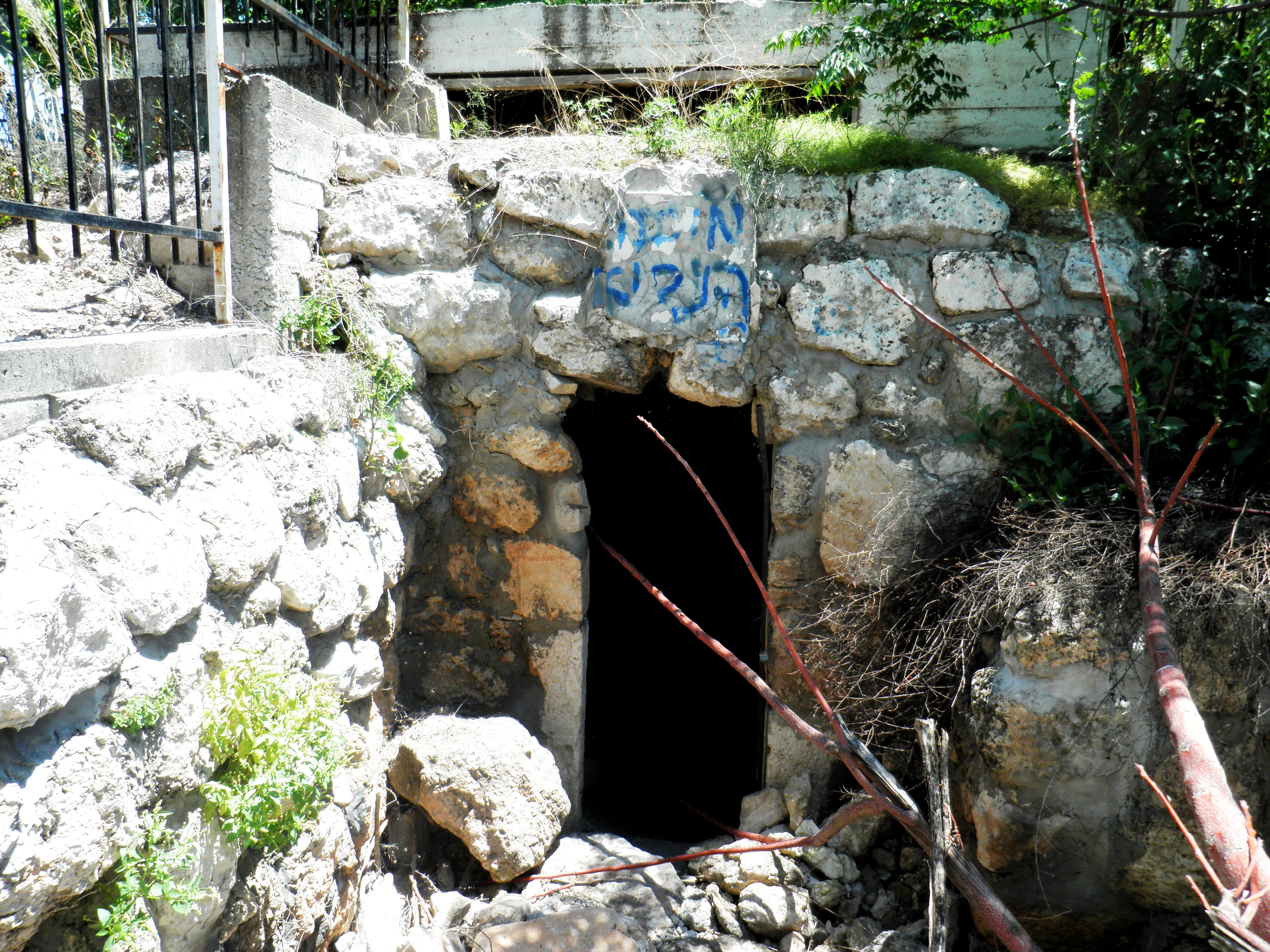
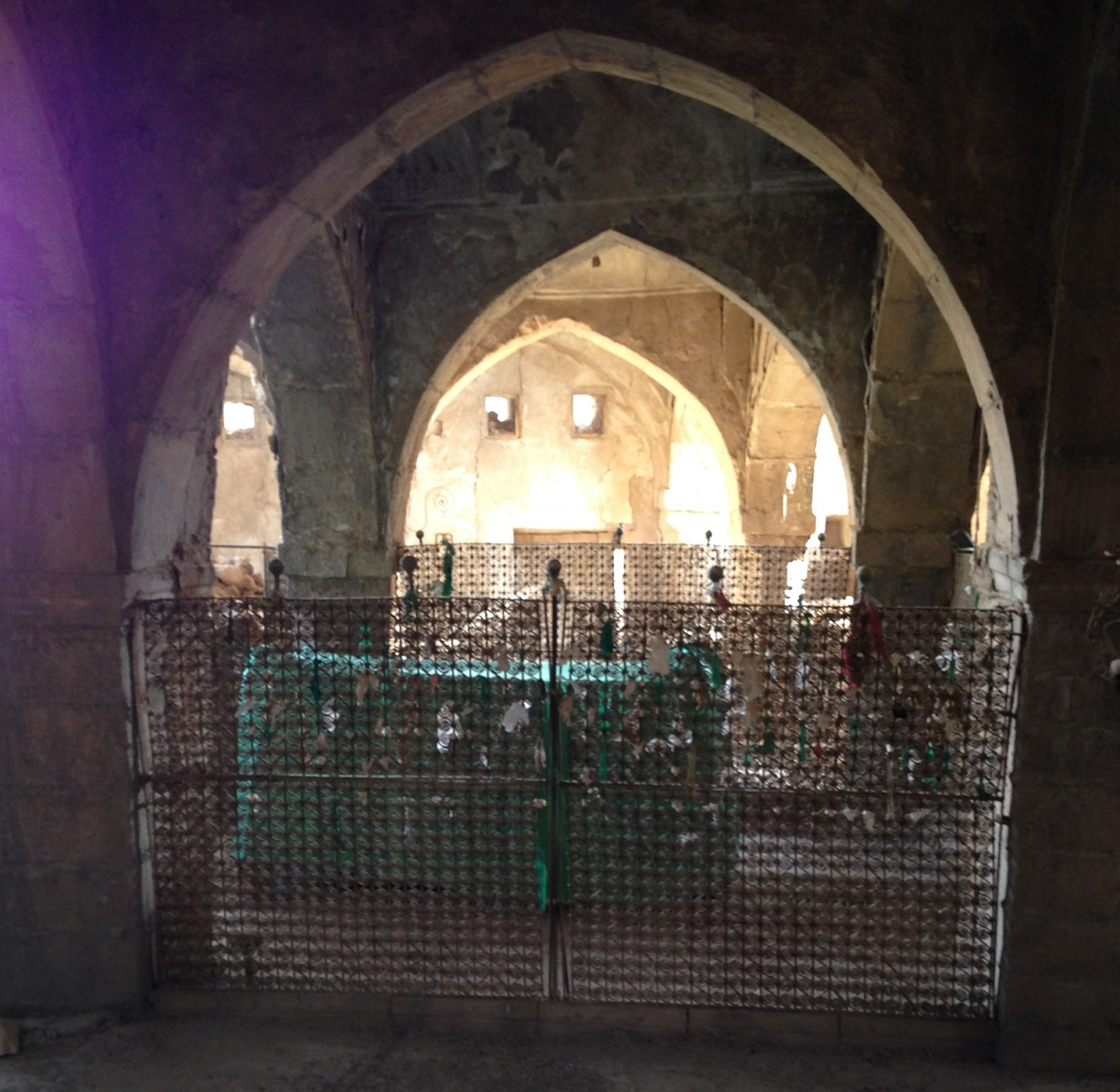
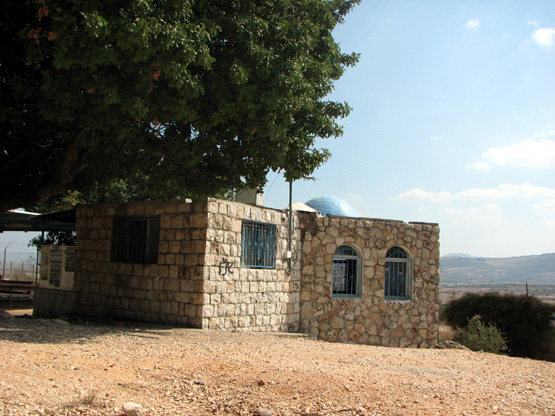
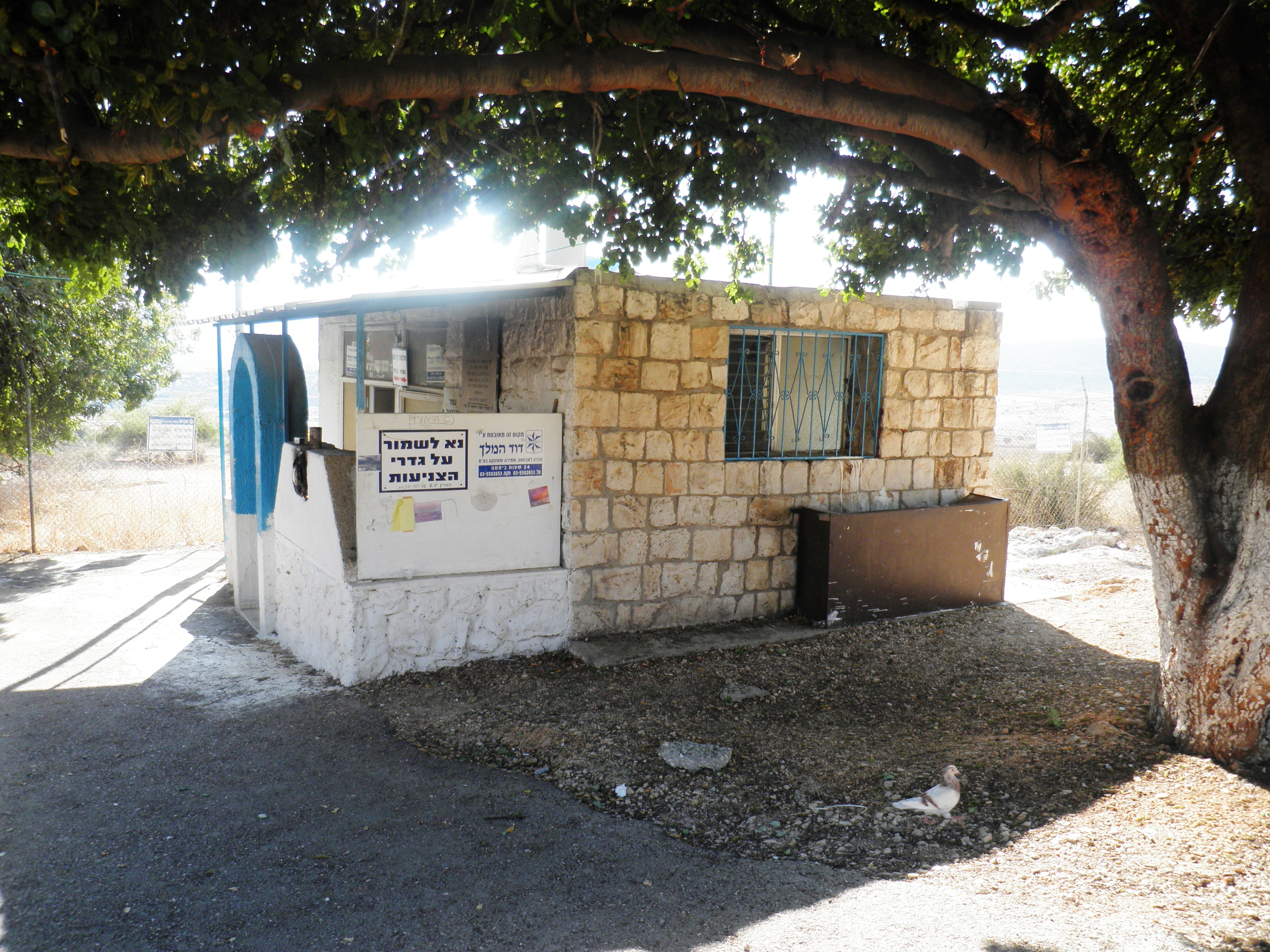
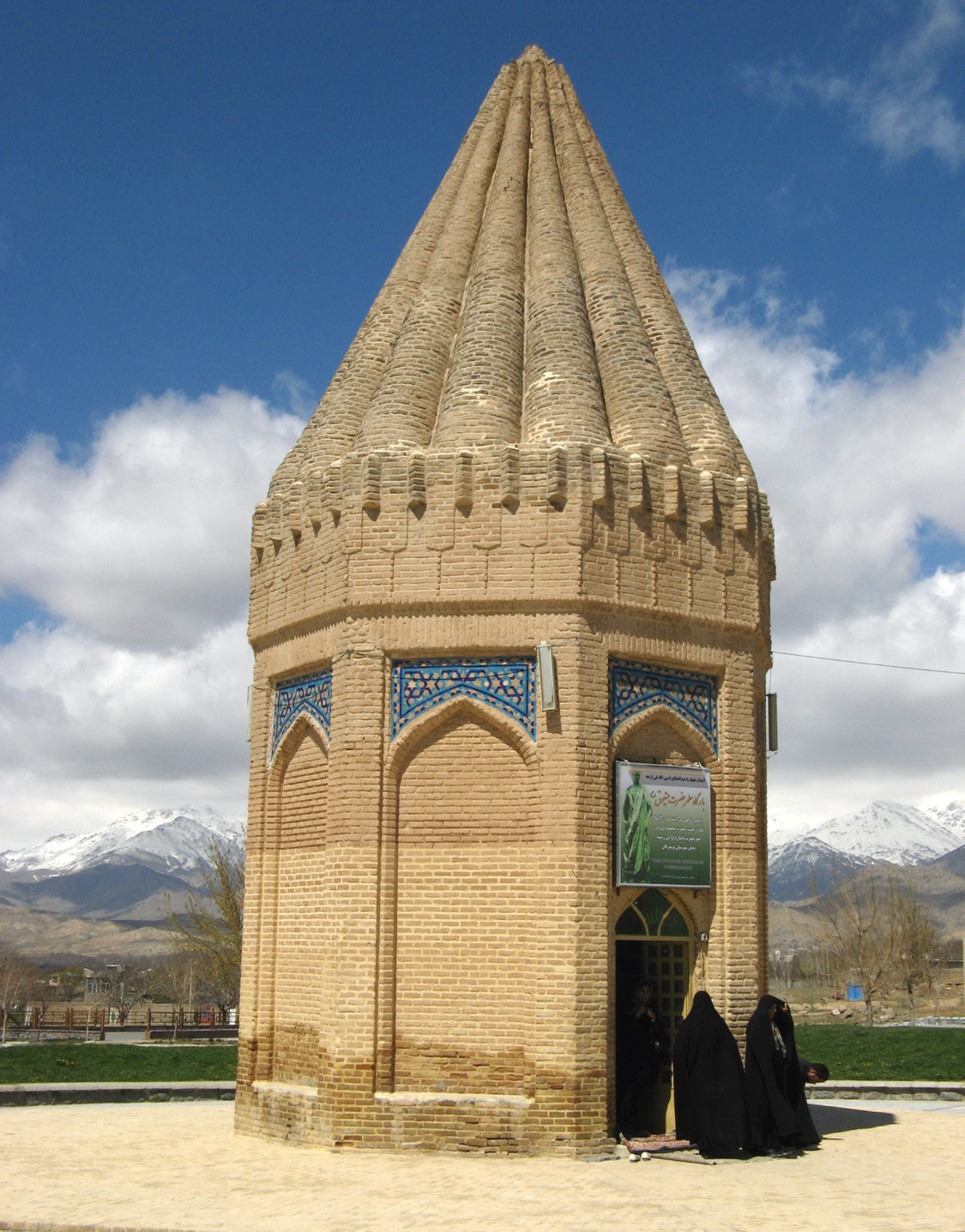
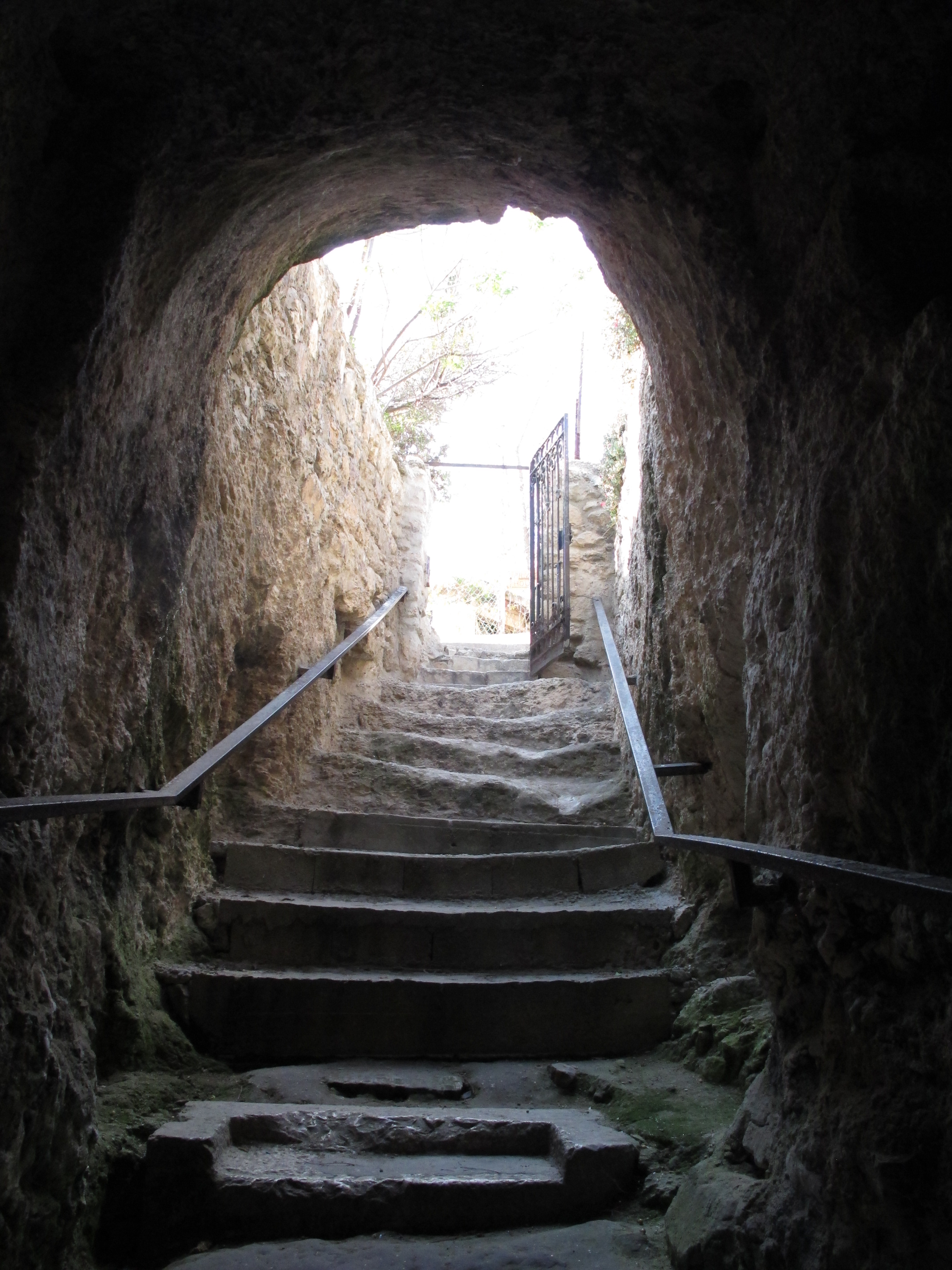
Biblical figure	Place name and location	Image	Notes
Nun	Timnath-heres, attributed to Kifl Hares, Salfit Governorate, West Bank
Joshua	Timnath-heres, attributed to Kifl Hares, Salfit Governorate, West Bank (pictured); Islam: An-Nabi Yusha’ bin Noon aka Prophet Joshua's Shrine, near As-Salt, Jordan.		Thousands make the pilgrimage to his tomb on the annual commemoration of his death, 26th of Nisan on the Hebrew calendar.
Caleb	Timnath-heres, attributed to Kifl Hares, Salfit Governorate, West Bank
Othniel Ben Kenaz	Tomb of Othniel Ben Kenaz in Hebron, West Bank
Shamgar	Tebnine, Lebanon	Seen here	The tomb is also known by Shia Muslims as the tomb of Prophet Siddiq.
Deborah, Barak and Yael	Tel Kaddesh, Israel
Samson	Beit Shemesh, Israel
Elkanah	Kedita, Upper Galilee, Israel	See here
Hannah and Samuel	Tomb of Samuel, West Bank. Christianity: Tomb of Hannah, Horvat Hani, Israel		Both Jewish and Muslim prayers are held at the tomb. Many religious Jews visit the tomb on the 28th of Iyar, the anniversary of Samuel the Prophet's death.
Eli	Shiloh, West Bank		According to Jewish tradition the Yahrzeit of Eli the Cohen is on י' באייר — the tenth day of Iyar.
Nathan and Gad	Halhul, Hebron Governorate, West Bank		The graves of Nathan and Gad are entombed in a mosque named after Jonah.
David	David's Tomb, Mount Zion, Jerusalem		1 Kings 2:10 says that King David was buried in his own city; the City of David is on the southeastern hill of Jerusalem, Mount Zion is its western hill. The "tomb" is a Crusader-era cenotaph (symbolical, empty sarcophagus). The building dates to the 2nd century CE the earliest, and the tradition of David being buried here was created by Byzantine Christians well over a millennium after his supposed death. The authentic tomb of David is probably a cave noted as 'T1' in a former Roman-era quarry outside of the modern city walls.
Absalom	Yad Avshalom, Mount of Olives, Jerusalem		Archaeologists have dated the tomb to the first century CE. Its association with Absalom only dates from the 12th century. Currently it is not considered by any religious group to be the tomb of Absalom, due to its age (1000 years too recent) and the Bible (2 Samuel 18:17, which says Absalom's body was covered over with stones in a pit in the forest of Ephraim).
Abner ben Ner	Hebron, West Bank		Rabbi Moses Basola visited the tomb in 1522. Sefer Yihus ha-Tzaddiqim (Book of Genealogy of the Righteous), a collection of travel writings first published in 1561, mentions the tomb.
Isaiah	Isaiah mausoleum, Esfahan, Iran (top) or Nahal Dishon, Israel (bottom)
Hushai	Yirka, Israel
Elisha	Elisha's Tomb. Disputed between: near Mt. Carmel, West Bank or Kfar Yassif near Acre, Israel and Eğil, Turkey.	Seen here
Huldah	Mount of Olives, Jerusalem	Seen here
Zedekiah	Cave of Zedekiah, Old City of Jerusalem
Ezekiel	Ezekiel's Tomb, Al Kifl, Iraq		Up till the mid-20th century, up to 5,000 Jews used to come to the tomb during Passover. Many Muslims believe this tomb to be that of an unspecified personality named Dhul-Kifl. This site was protected under the control of Saddam Hussein, and renovated extensively in 2014.
Baruch ben Neriah	Reportedly in the Al-Nukhailah Mosque, Al-Kifl, Iraq		Exact location unknown. According to Jewish tradition, Baruch's tomb is located about 1-mile (1.6 km) away from Ezekiel's Tomb near a town called "Mashhad Ali" which there is no record of ever existing. However, there is a tomb within the Al-Nukhailah Mosque in Al-Kifl dedicated to Baruch. Corresponding with the earlier legend, it is located near to the Tomb of Ezekiel, which is also in the same building.
Hosea	Ancient Jewish cemetery of Safed, Israel
Amittai	Beit Ummar, near Hebron, West Bank		Mosque of Nabi Matta: The main mosque in Beit Ummar housing the tomb of Nabi Matta or Amittai, father of Jonah. Mujir ad-Din writes that Matta was "a holy man from the people of the house of the prophecy." Nearby Halhul houses the tomb of Jonah with the inscription reading "Yunus ibn Matta" or "Jonah son of Amittai", confirming that Matta is indeed the Arabic name for Amittai and the Beit Ummar tomb is dedicated to Amittai. In 1226, the Ayyubid sultan al-Mu'azzam built a mosque with a minaret under the supervision of Jerusalem governor Rashid ad-Din al-Mu'azzami. The Mamluks constructed some additions to the mosque and engraved several inscriptions on its surface. Also seen here.
Jonah	Disputed between: Nabi Yunus Mosque, Mosul (top); Jonah’s Hill, Ashdod (second); Mashhad, Israel (third); Halhul, Hebron (bottom)		Masshad tomb can also be seen here.
Micah	Kabul, Israel or also at Jezzine, Lebanon		The shrine in Jezzine is also known as the tomb of a Prophet Misha.
Nahum	Al Qush, south of Dahuk, Iraq.		There are however two other sites mentioned in historical accounts: Elkesi, near Ramah in the Galilee and Elcesei in the West Bank
Habakkuk	Some locate it at Huqoq, others at Kadarim, Israel. There is a shrine in Toyserkan, Iran as well.
Zephaniah	En-Nabi Safi, Southern Lebanon	Seen here	The tomb is located inside a Muslim shrine, known by locals as the shrine of a Prophet Safi.
Haggai, Malachi, and Zechariah	Tomb of the Prophets, Mount of Olives, Jerusalem

== Figures mentioned in the Ketuvim (Writings) ==
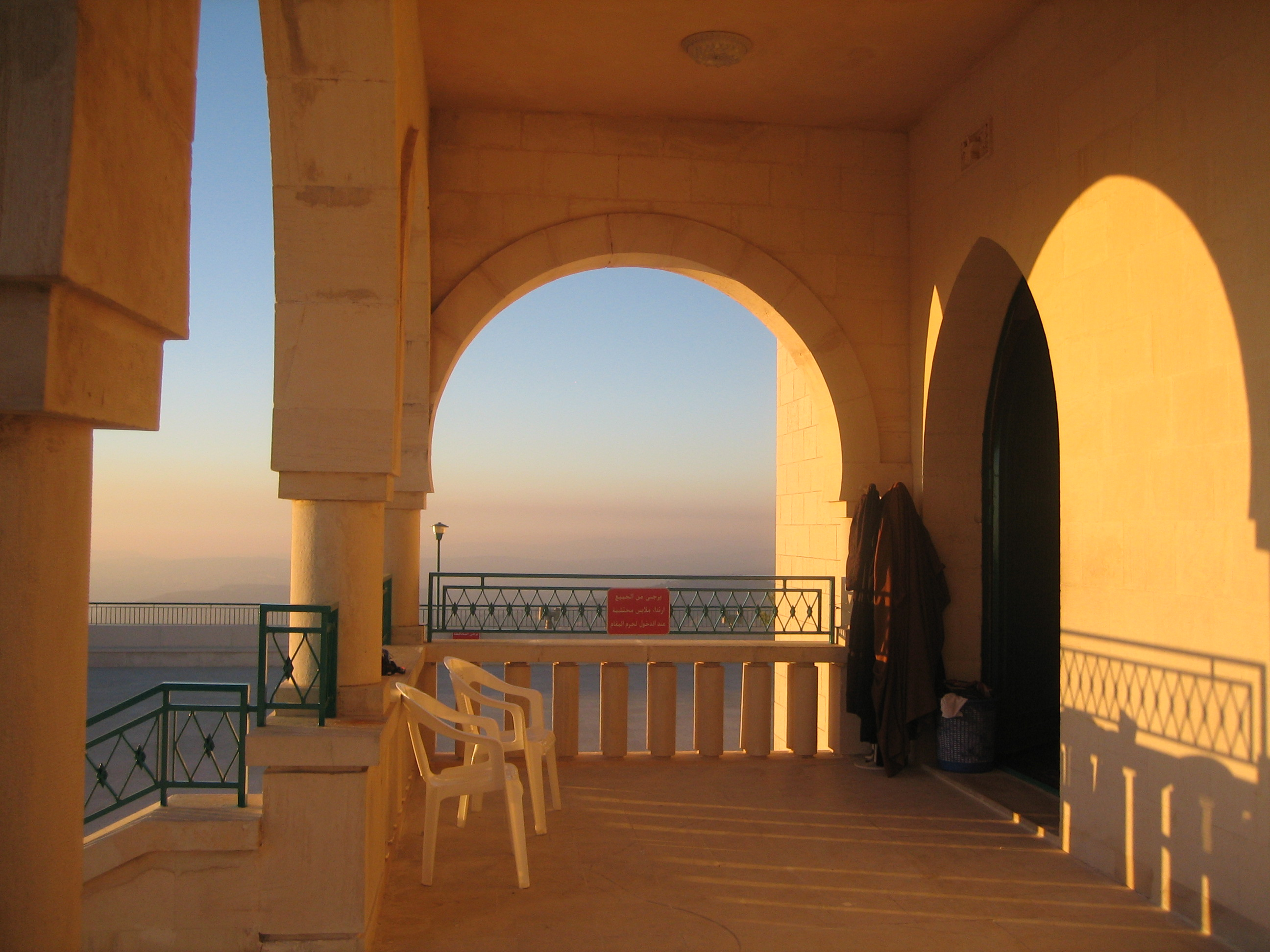
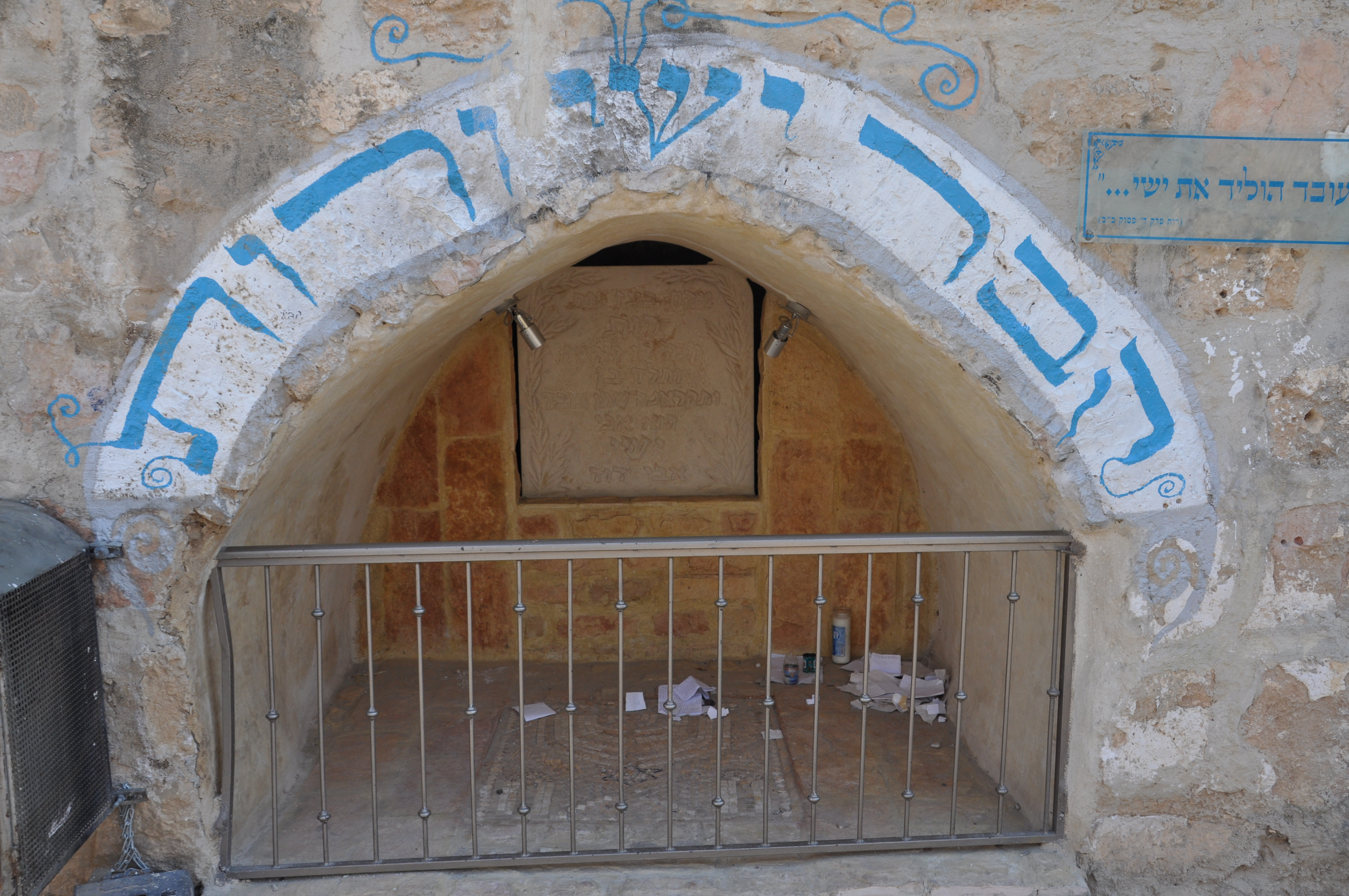
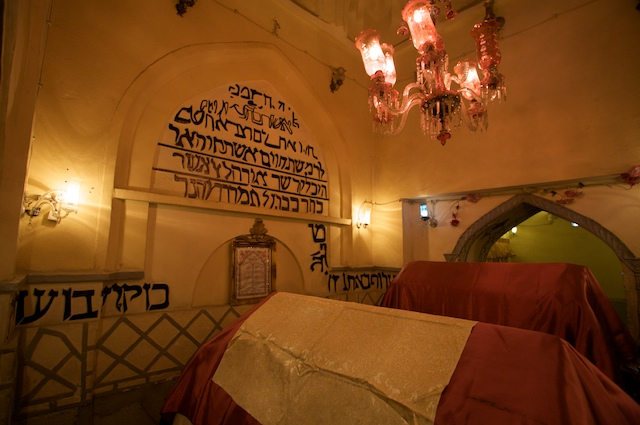
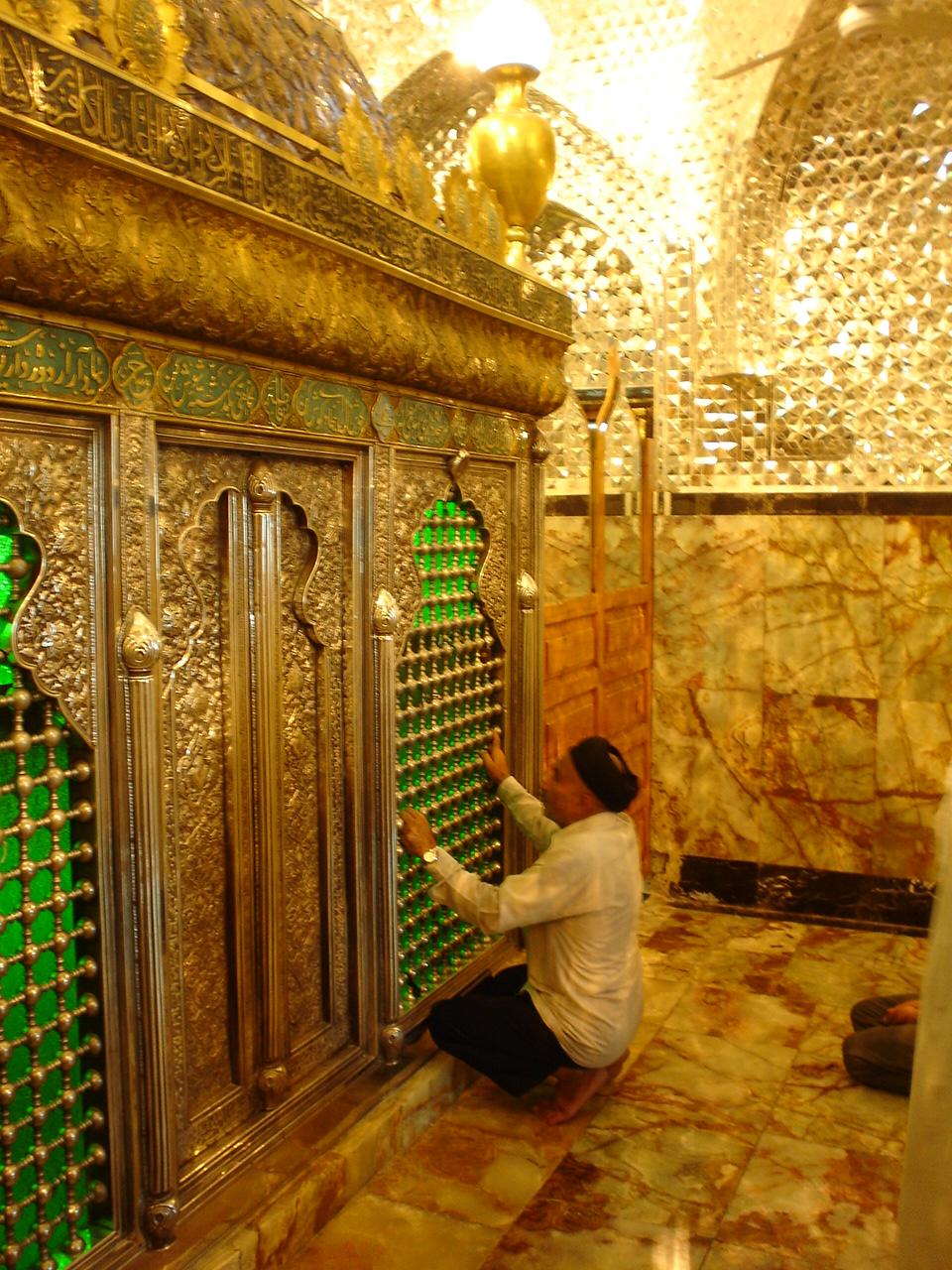
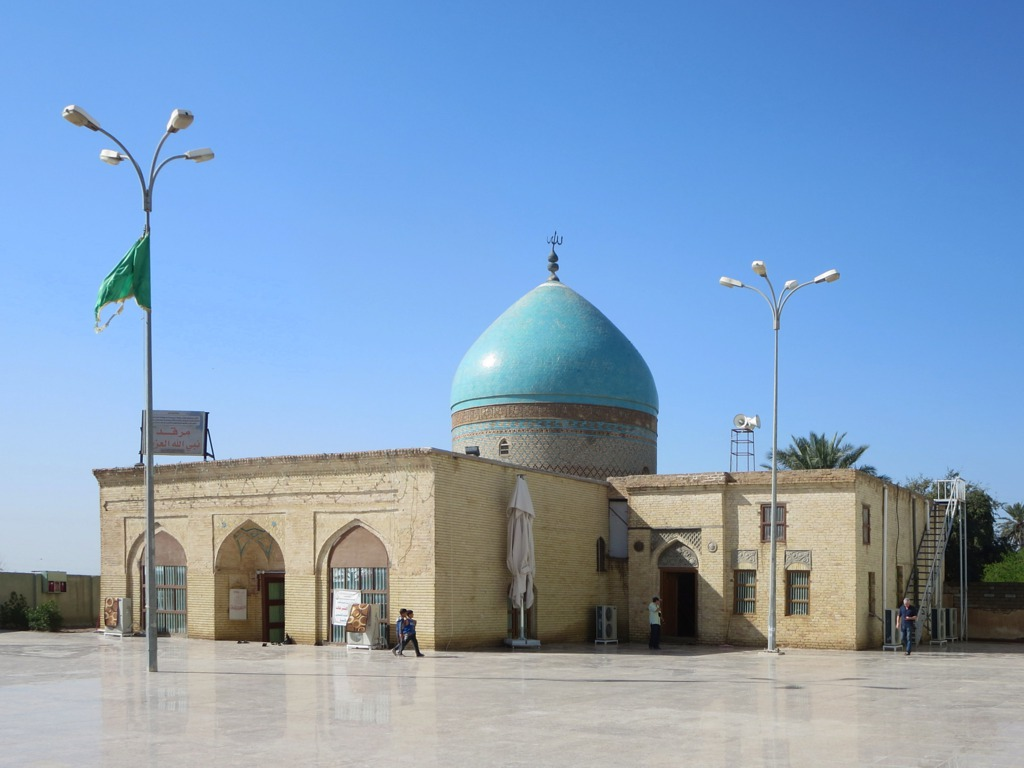
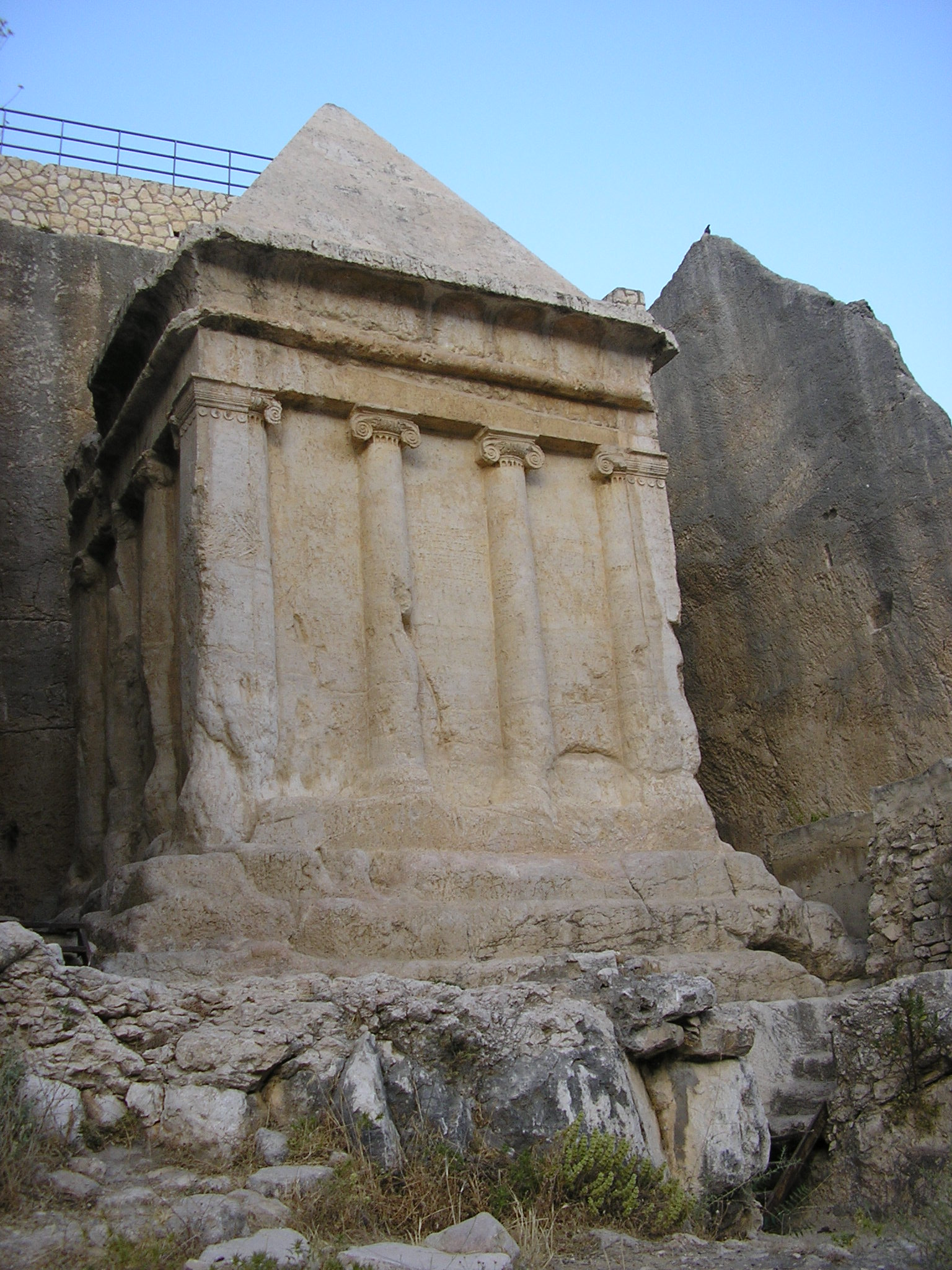
Biblical figure	Place name and location	Image	Notes
Job	In Druzism: Chouf District, Lebanon (pictured). In Shia Islam: Shrine of Prophet Ayyub, Hillah, Iraq.		Yaqut al-Hamawi recorded that it was located in Al-Shaykh Saad, while another tradition locates it at Salalah, Oman. In Judaism, Job is sometimes considered to be a fictional character in a parable written by Moses, with no actual burial site.
Jesse and Ruth	Tomb of Jesse and Ruth, Hebron, West Bank
Mordecai and Esther	Tomb of Esther and Mordechai, Hamedan, Iran		Persian Jews still make annual pilgrimage in honor of the Purim festival.
Daniel	Tomb of Daniel, Susa, Iran (pictured). There are however six other traditional sites including Kirkuk in Iraq and Samarkand in Uzbekistan		At the site in Kirkuk, the locals claim that Hananiah, Mishael, and Azaria are buried alongside Daniel.
Ezra	Ezra's Tomb, Al-'Uzayr, near Basra, Iraq		Preserved by Jewish caretakers until the middle of the 20th century. From that point, a local Muslim Iraqi took the responsibility of preserving the location. The area surrounding the tomb is used today as a place of Muslim worship although Hebrew inscriptions are still present in the room. Located where Tigris and Euphrates meet.
Zechariah ben Jehoiada	Tomb of Zechariah, Mount of Olives, Jerusalem

== Figures mentioned in the New Testament ==
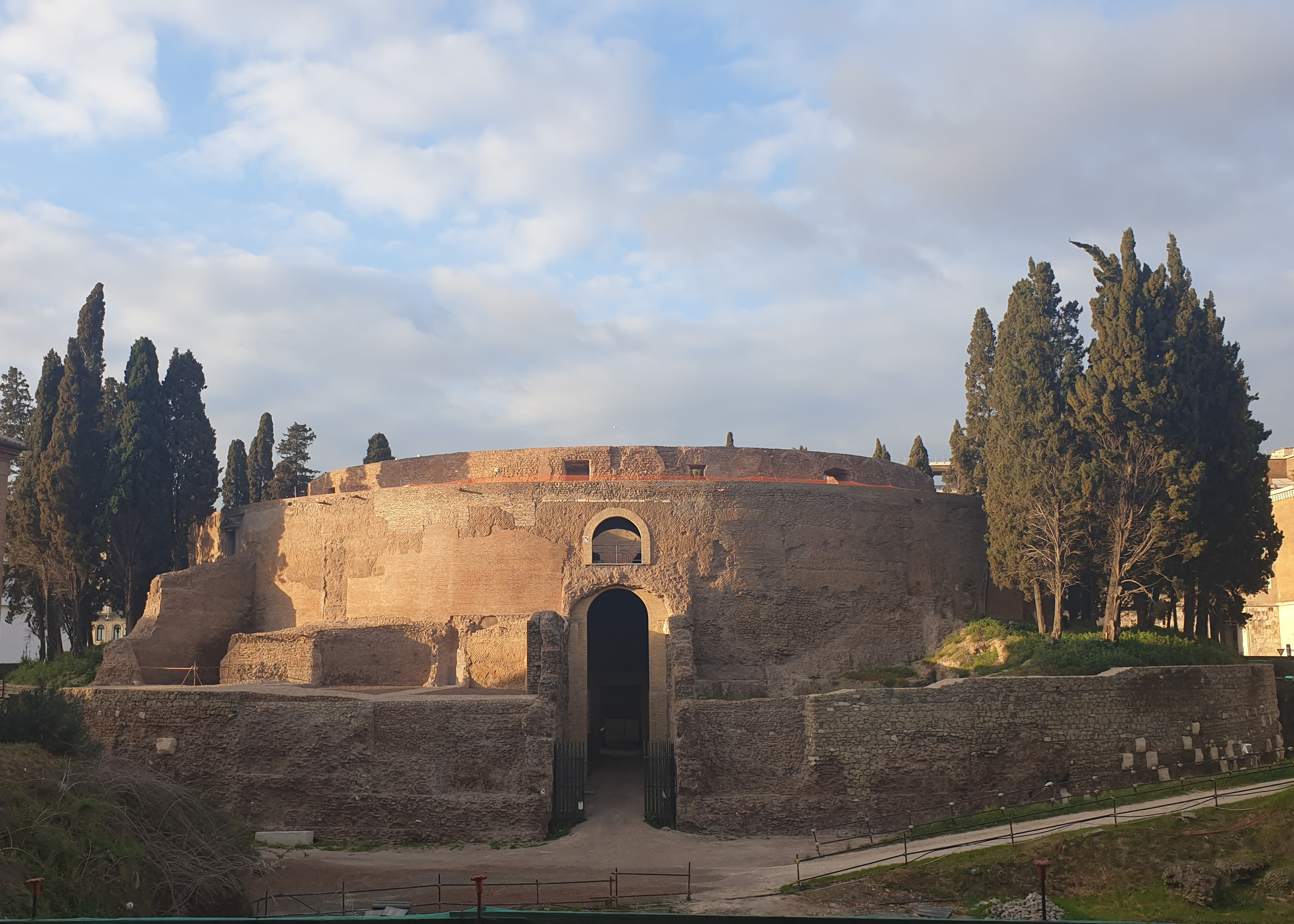
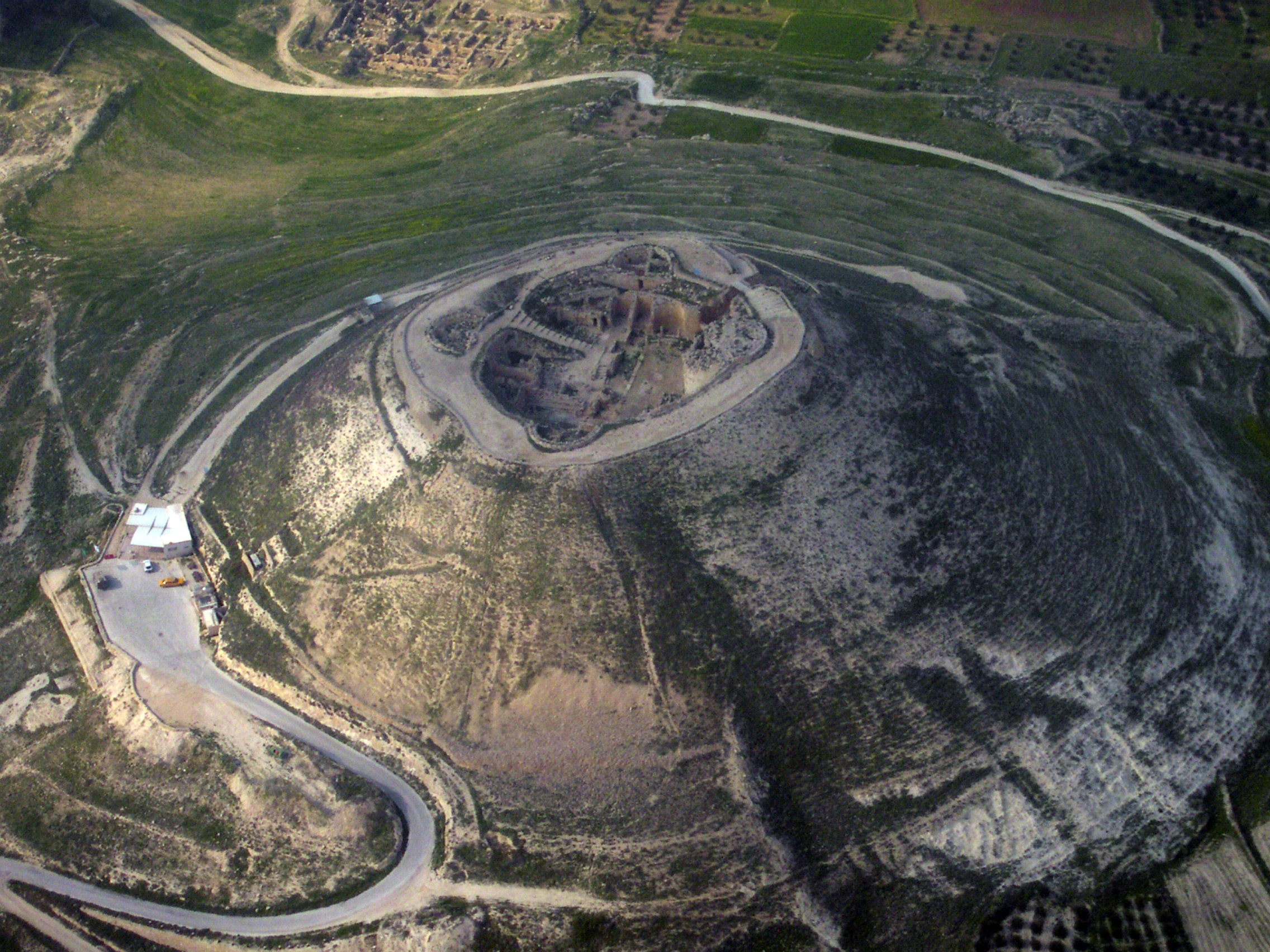
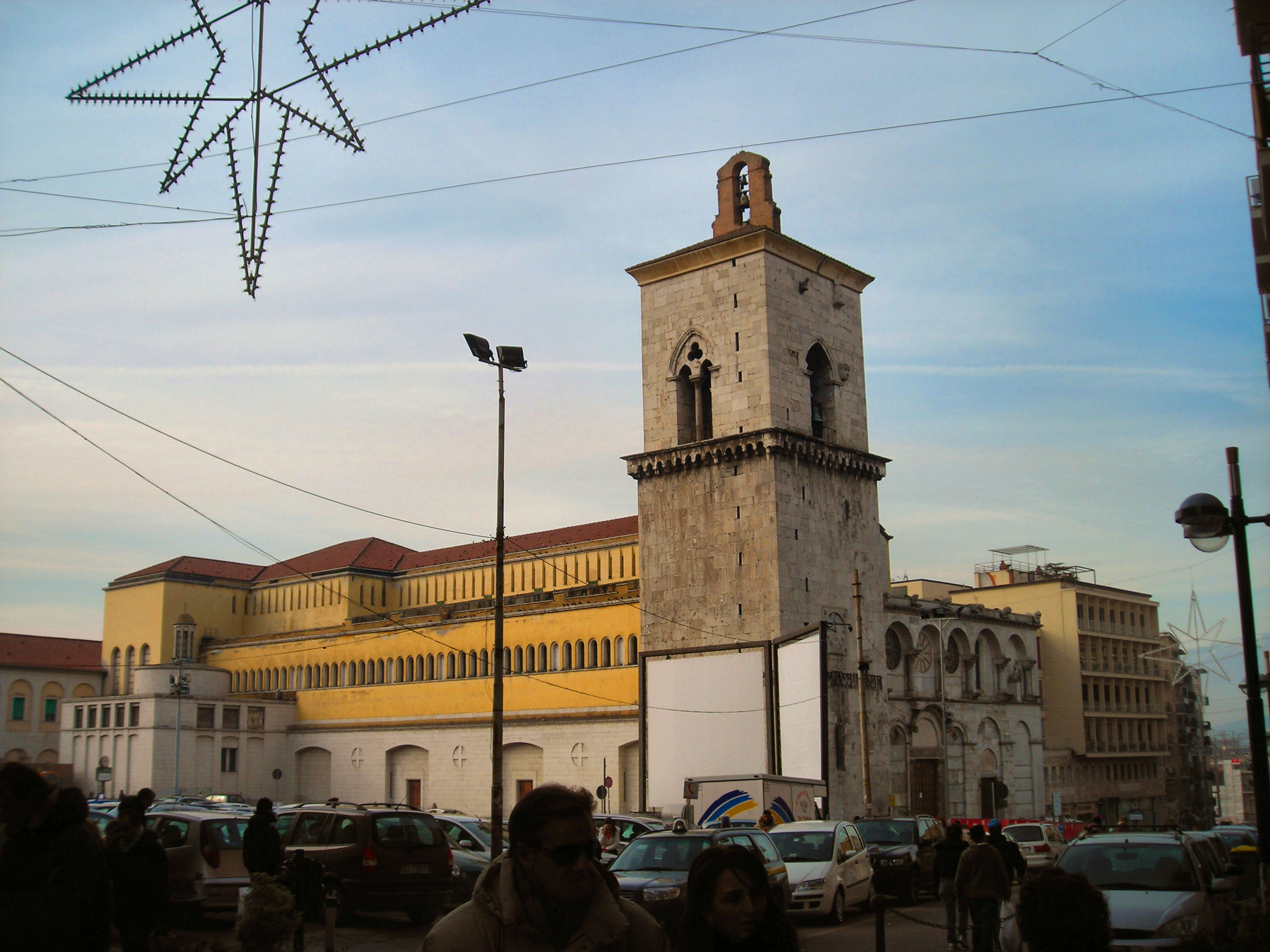
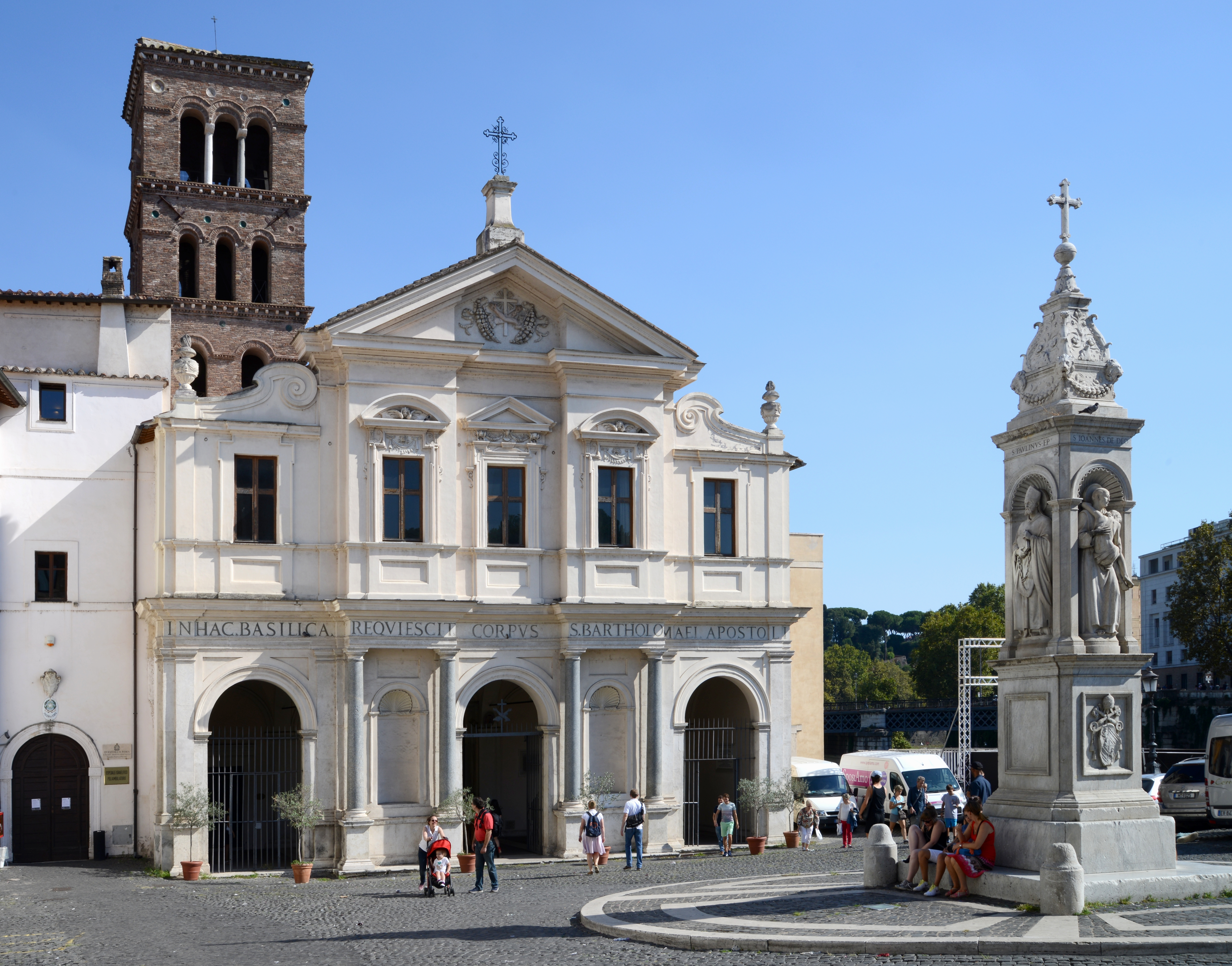
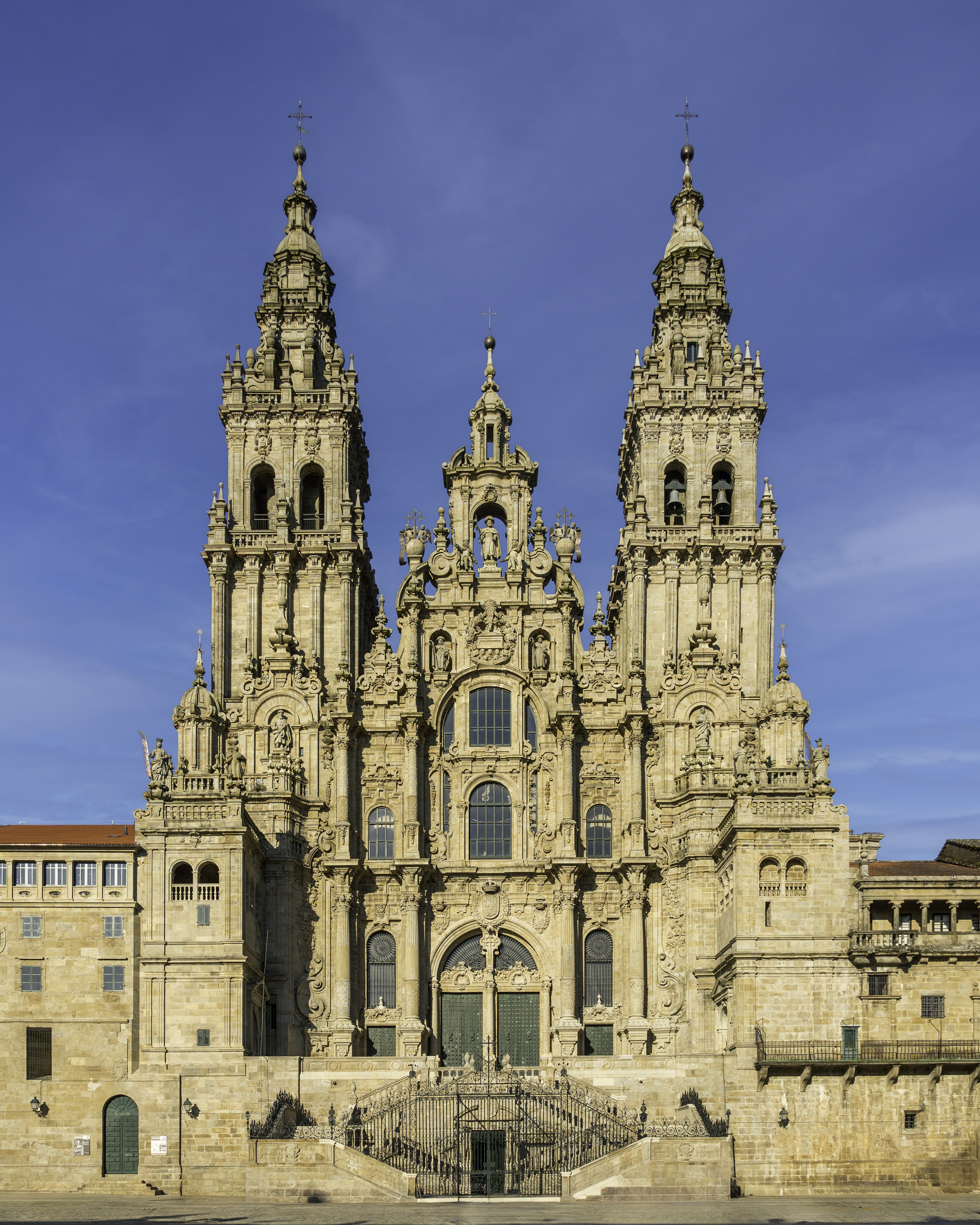
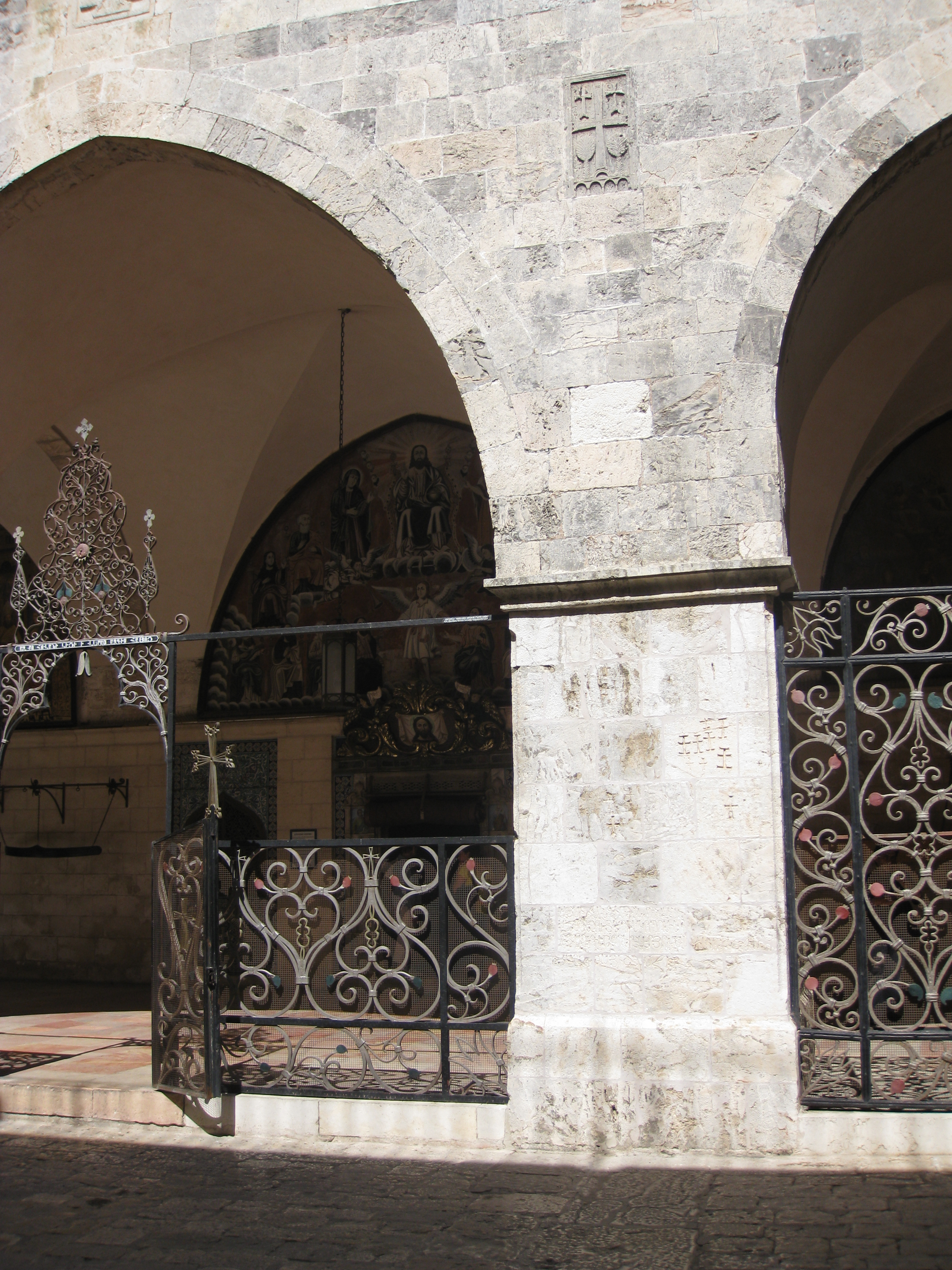
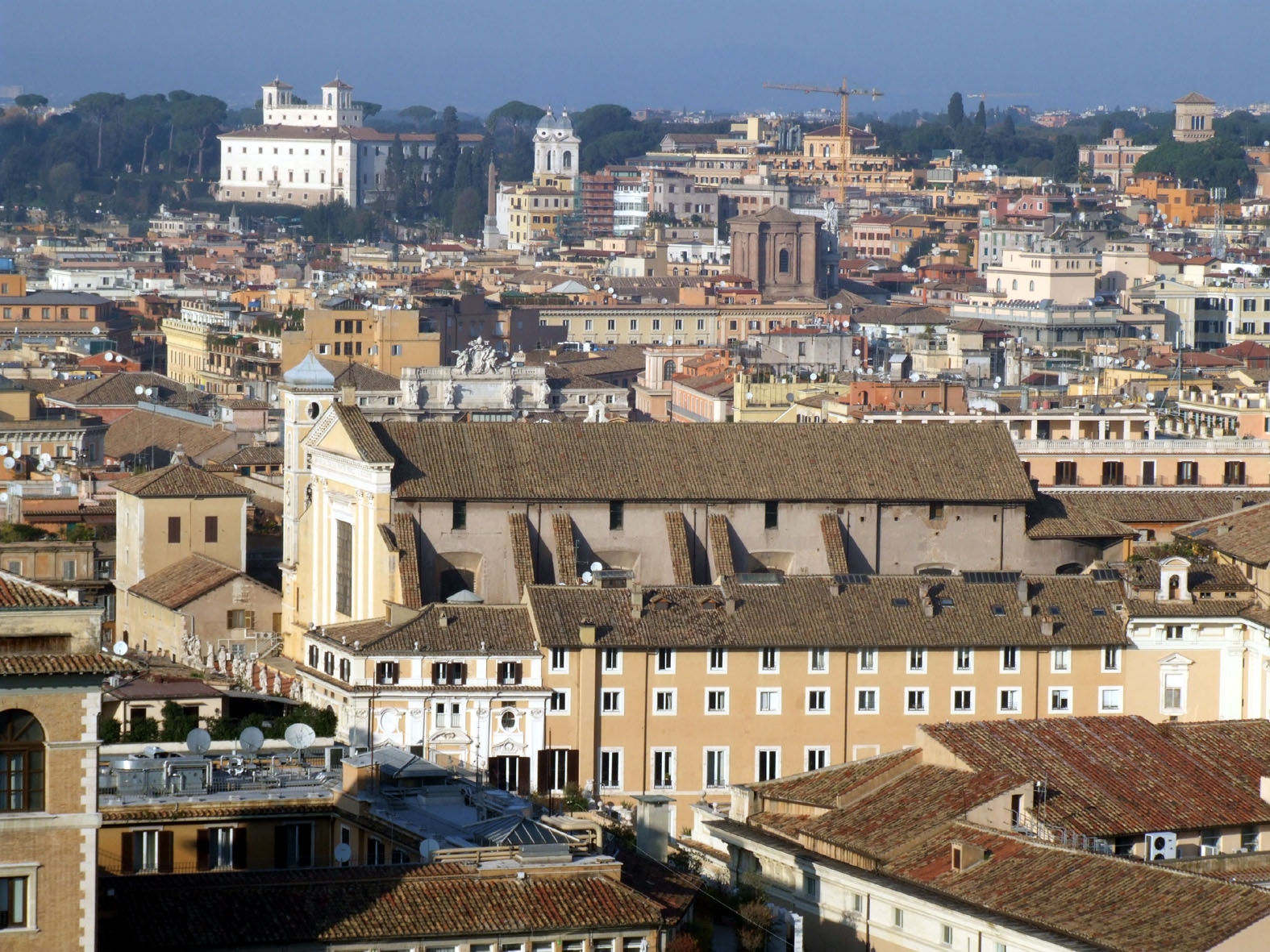
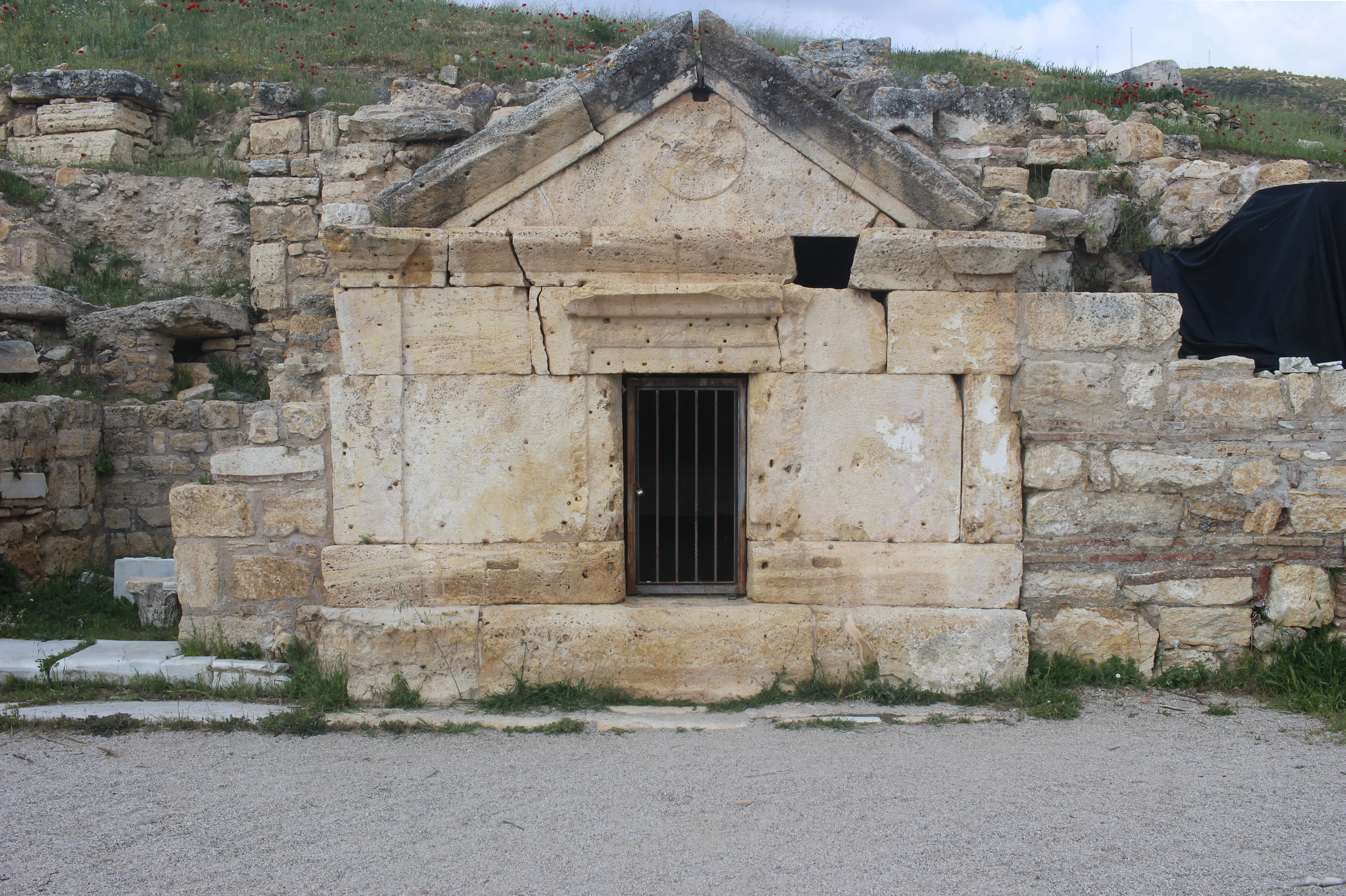
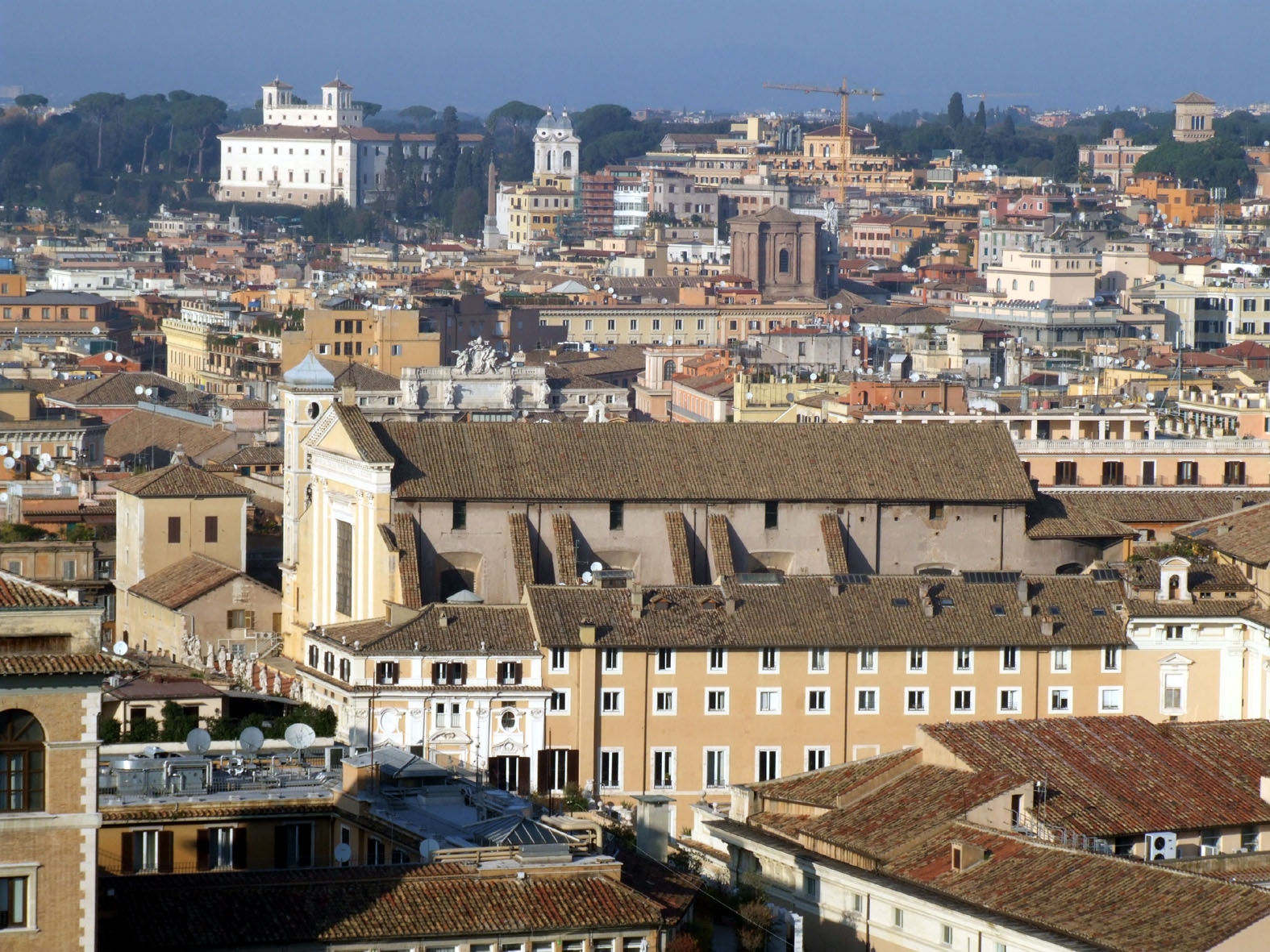
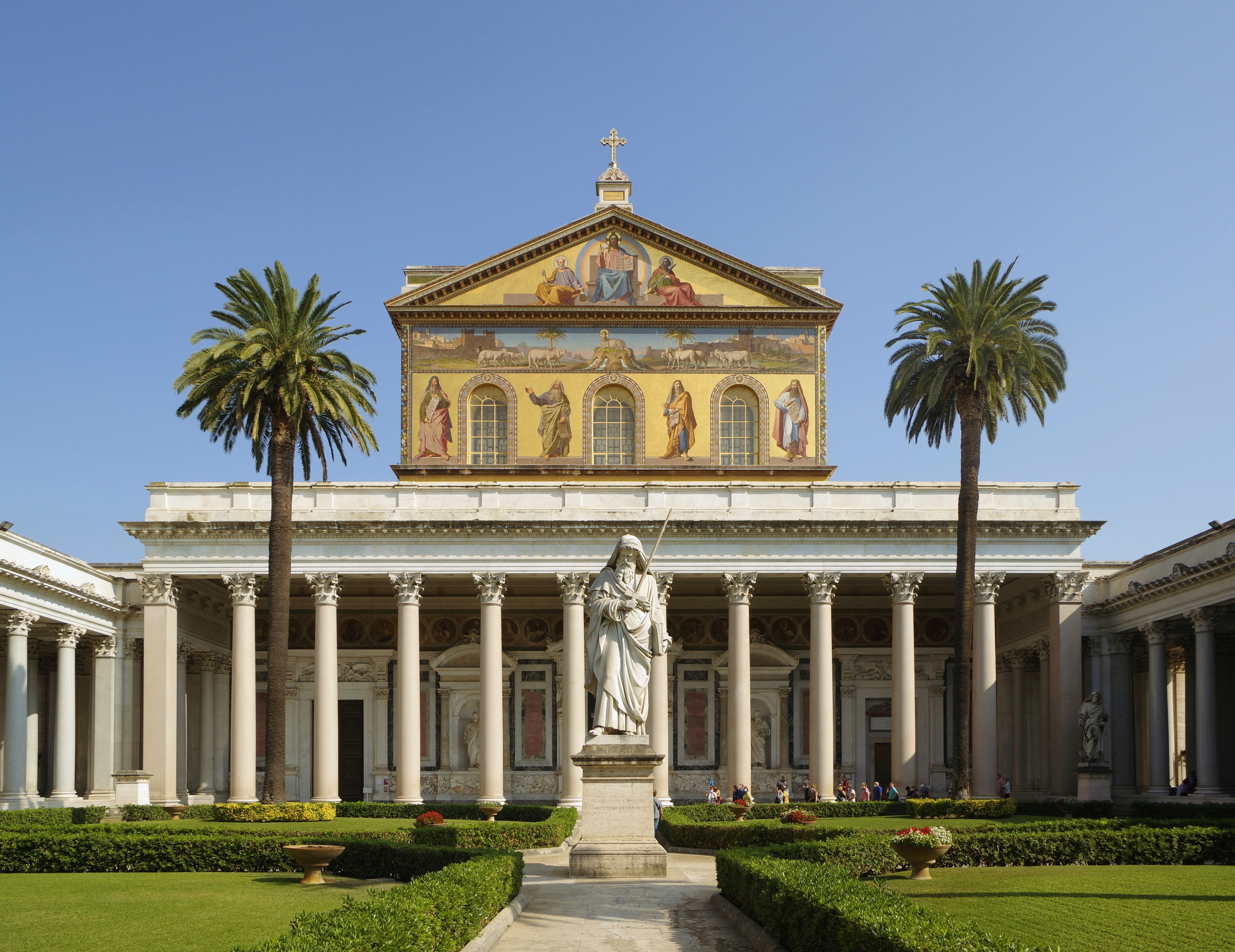
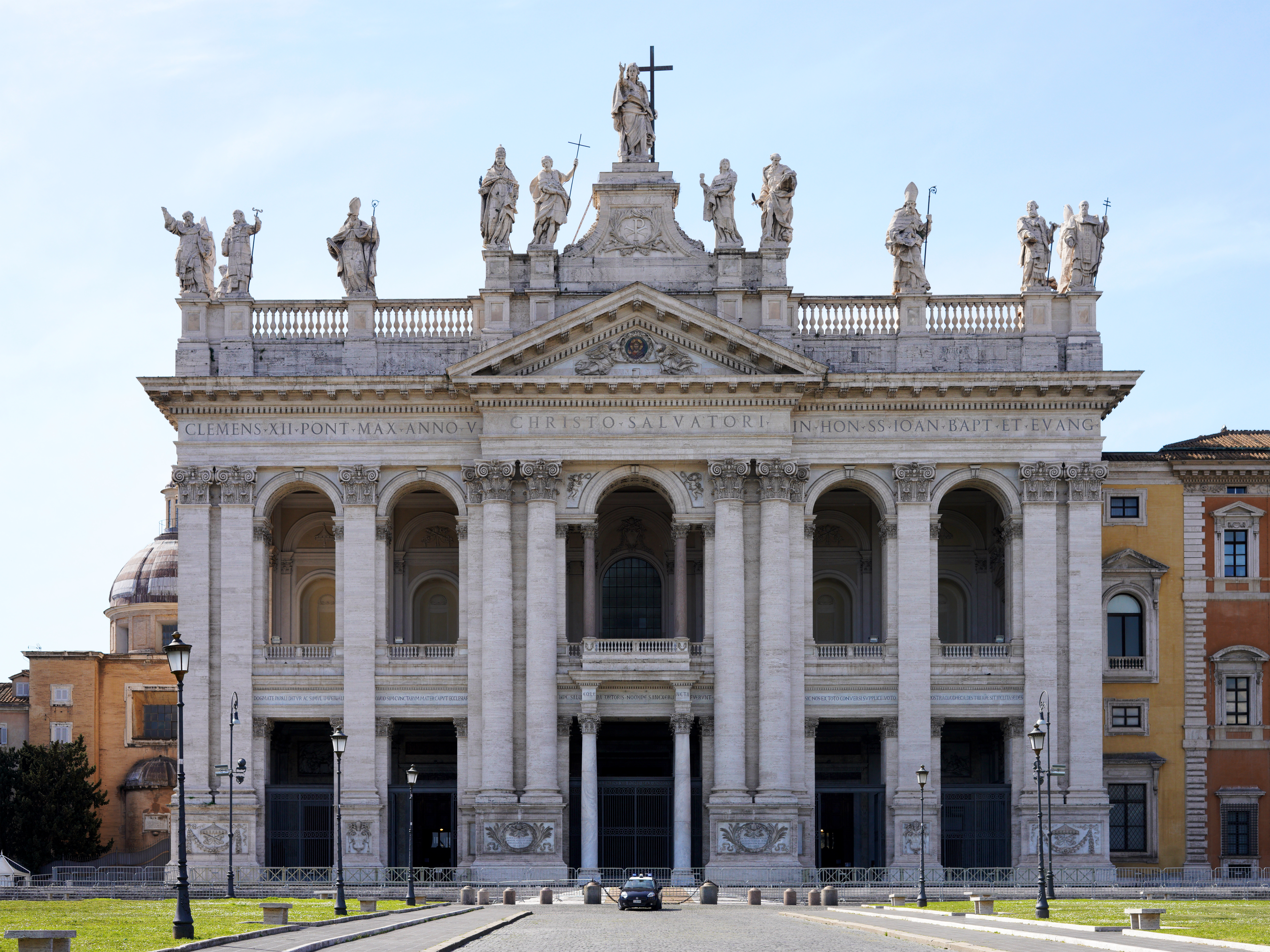
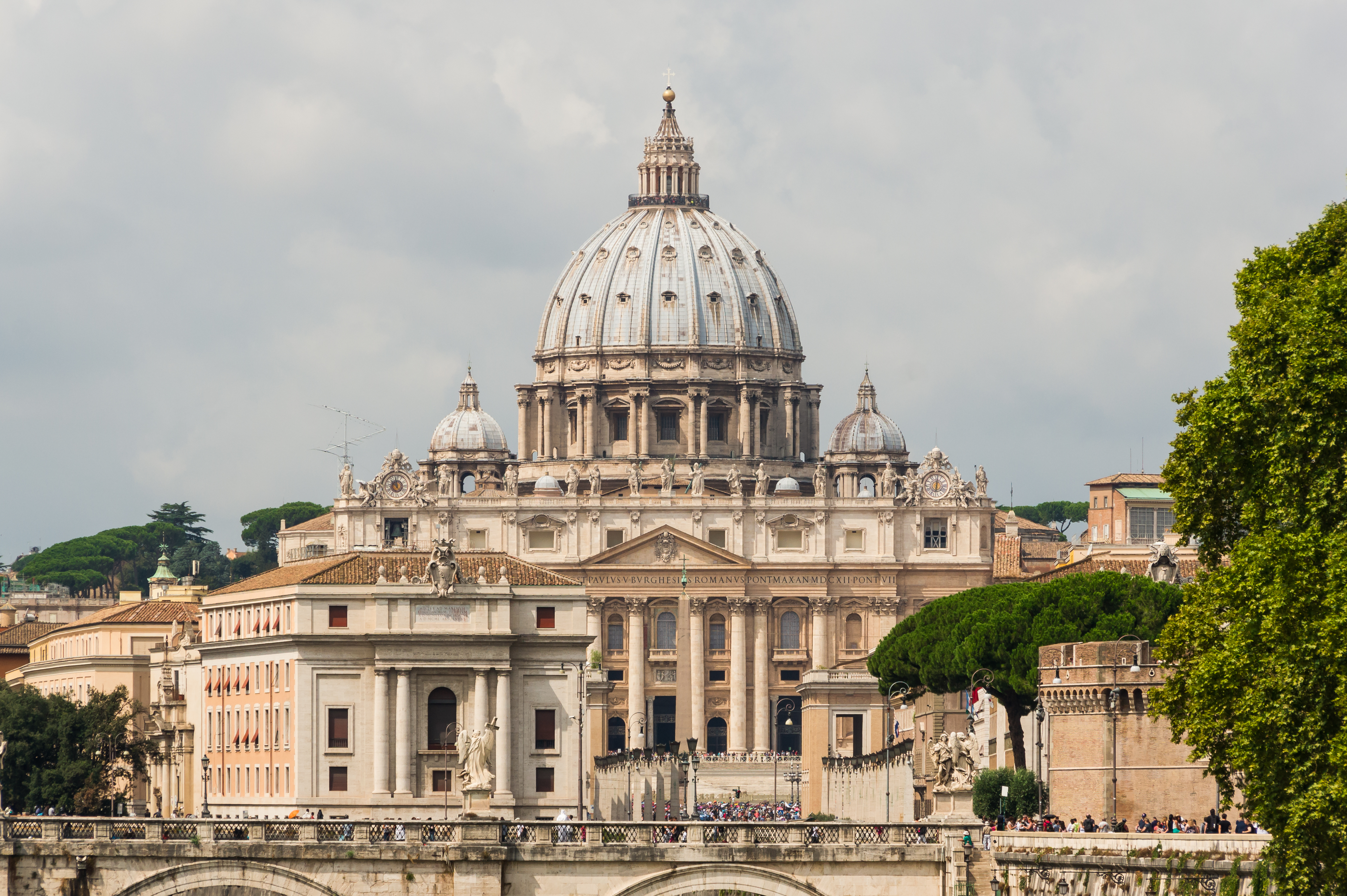
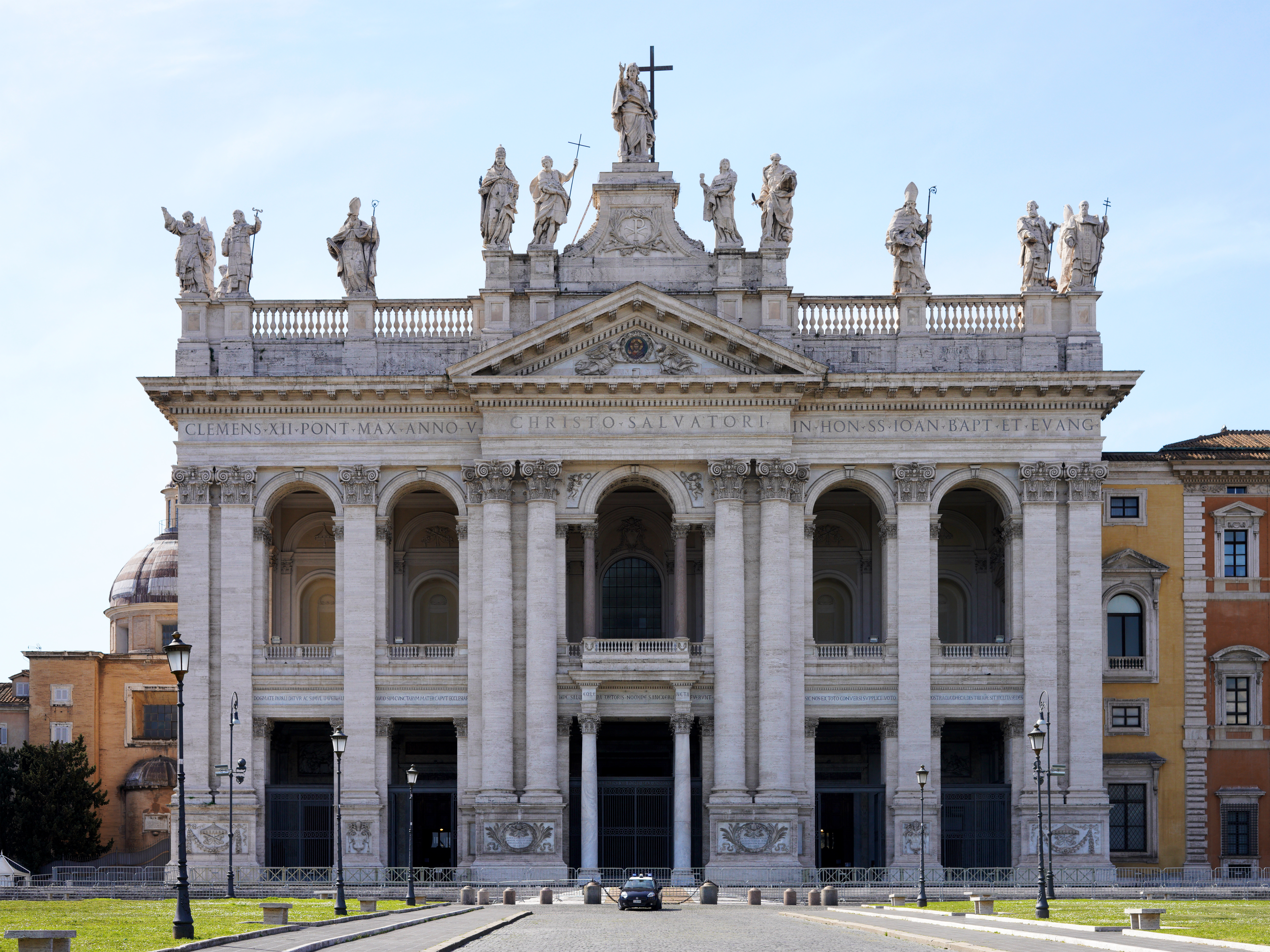
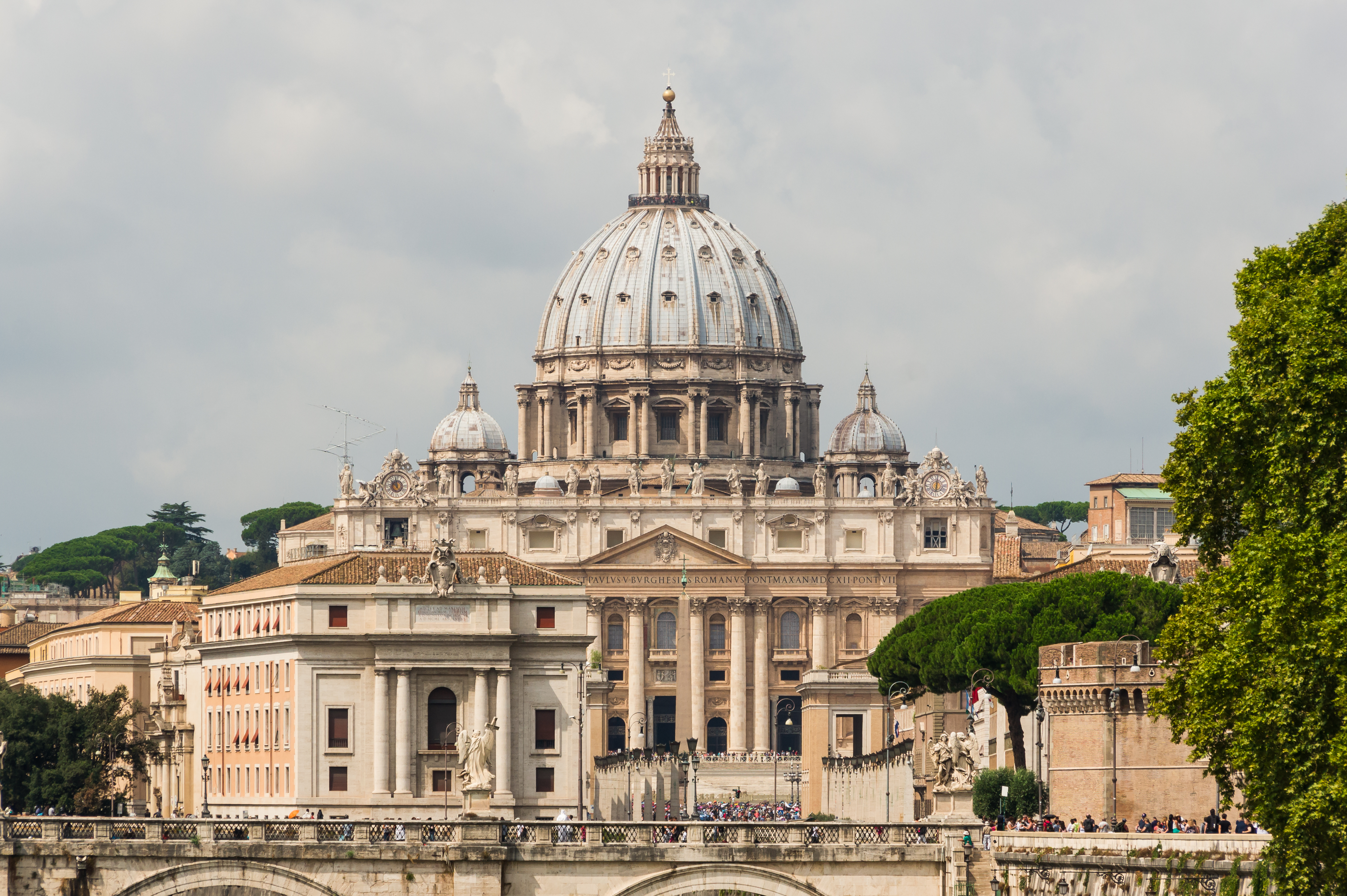
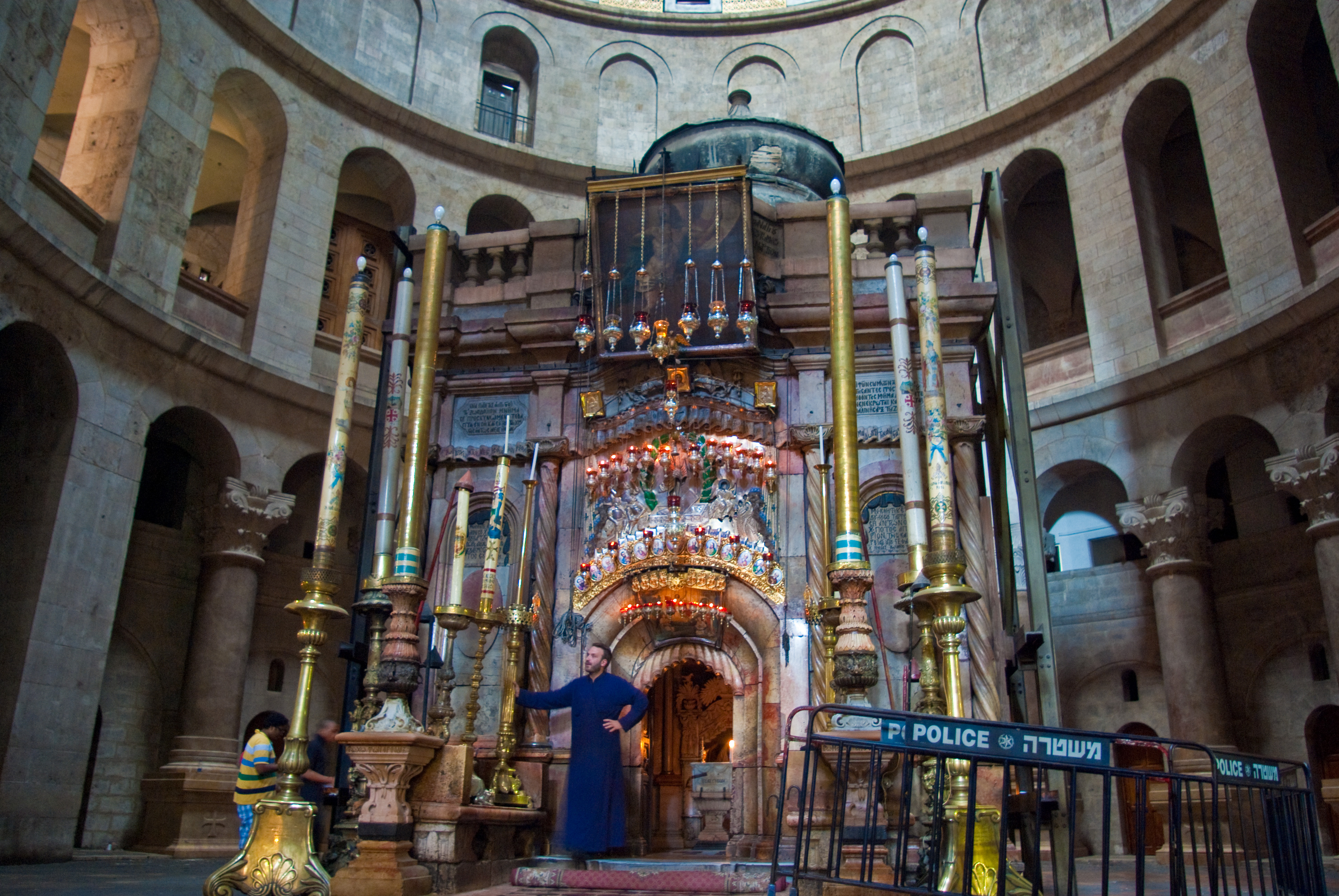
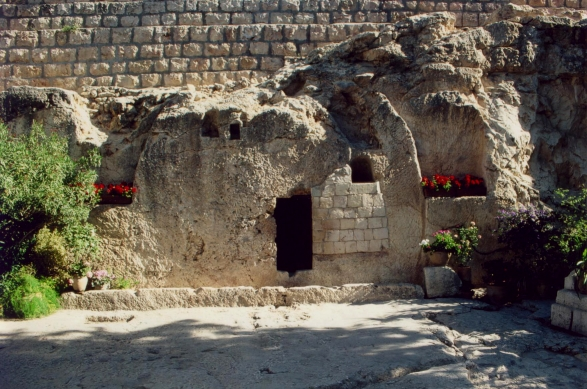
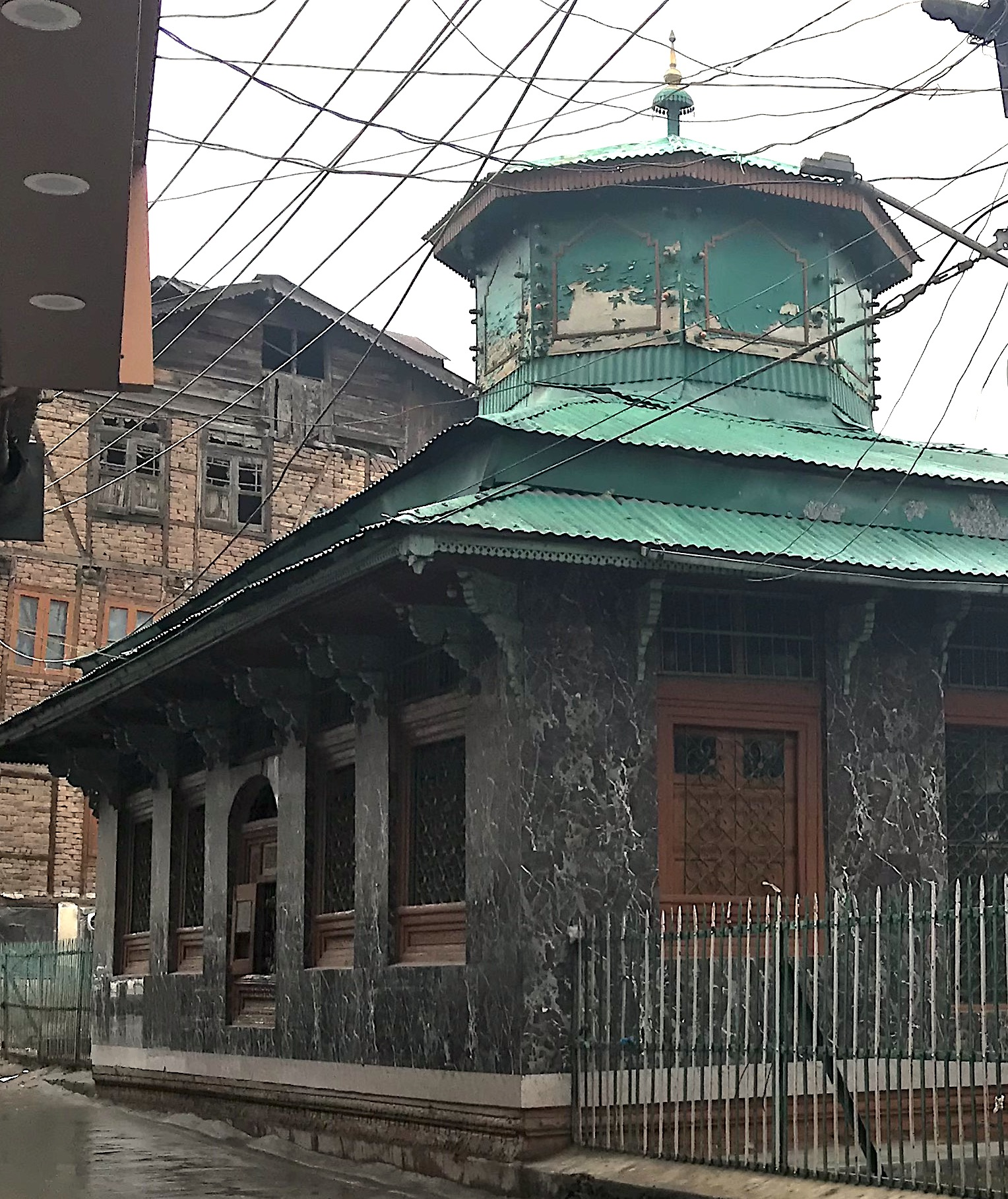
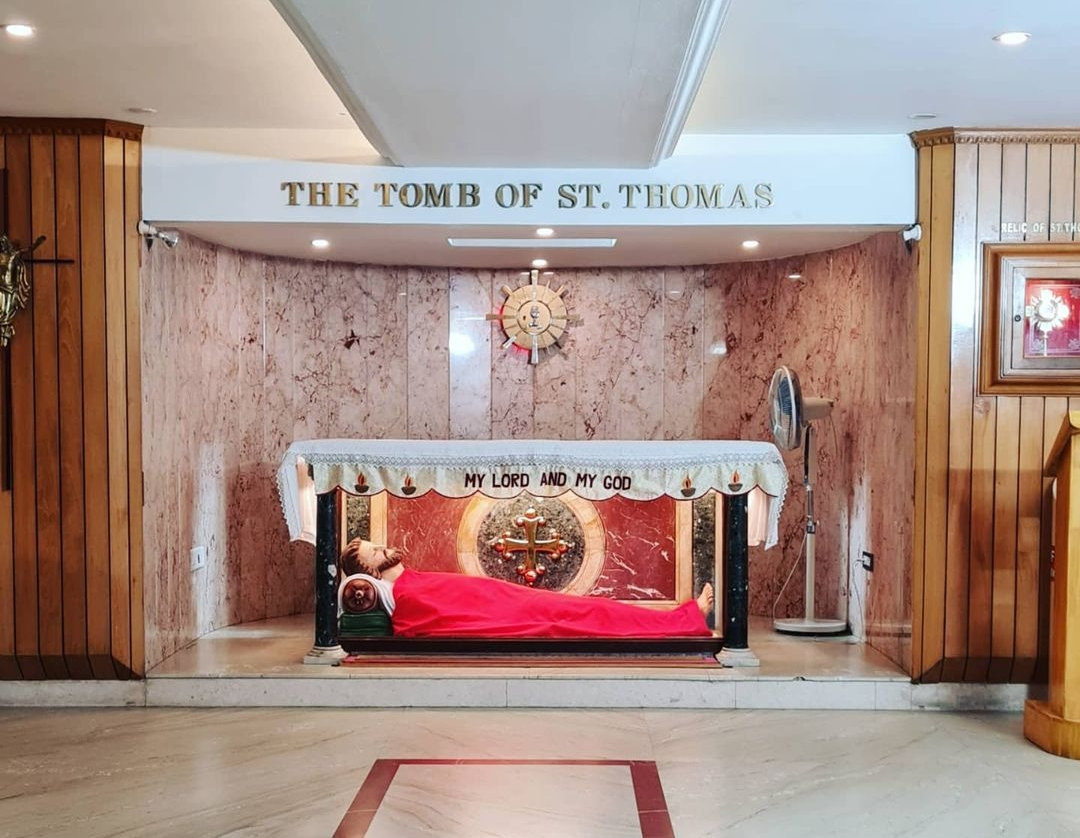
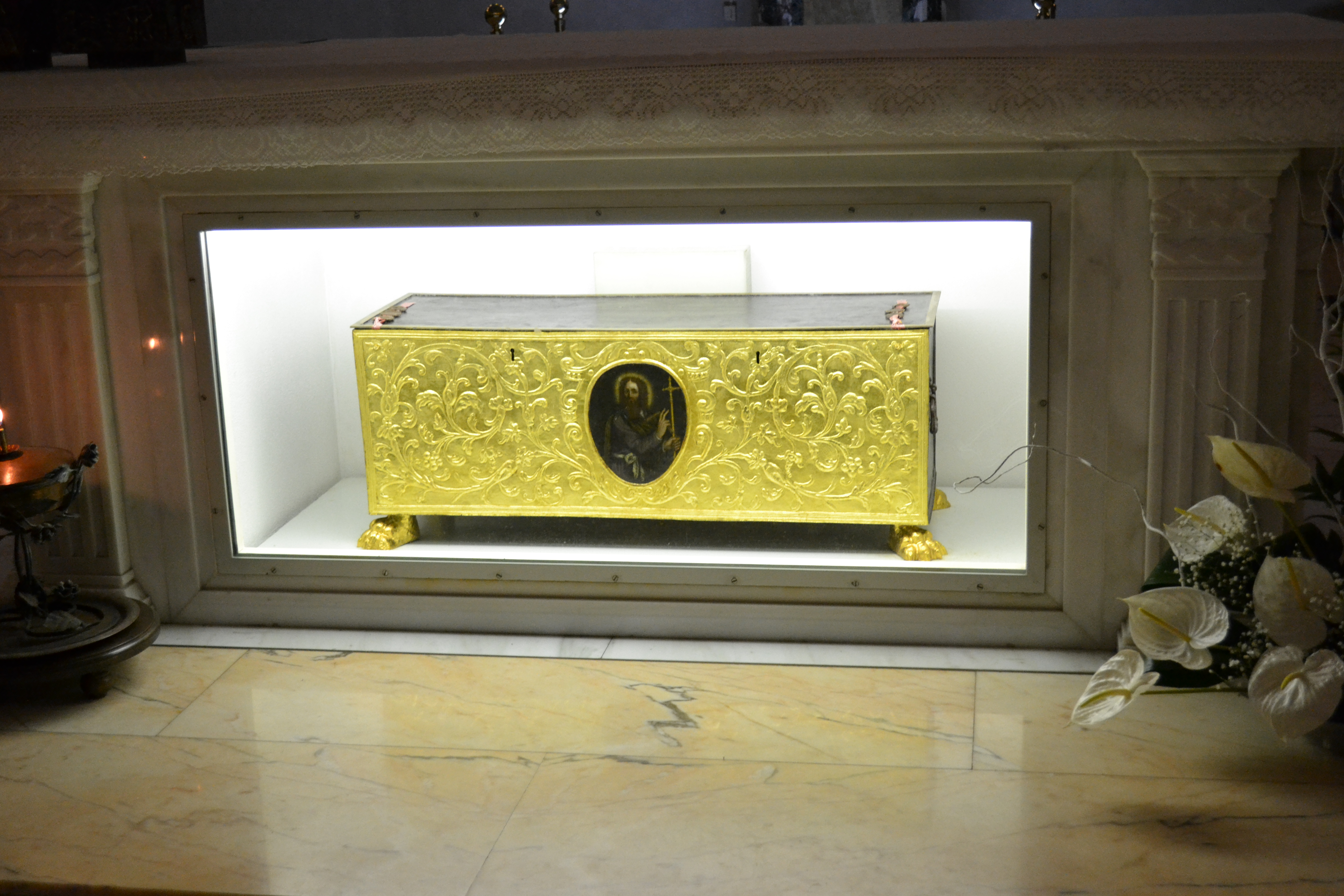
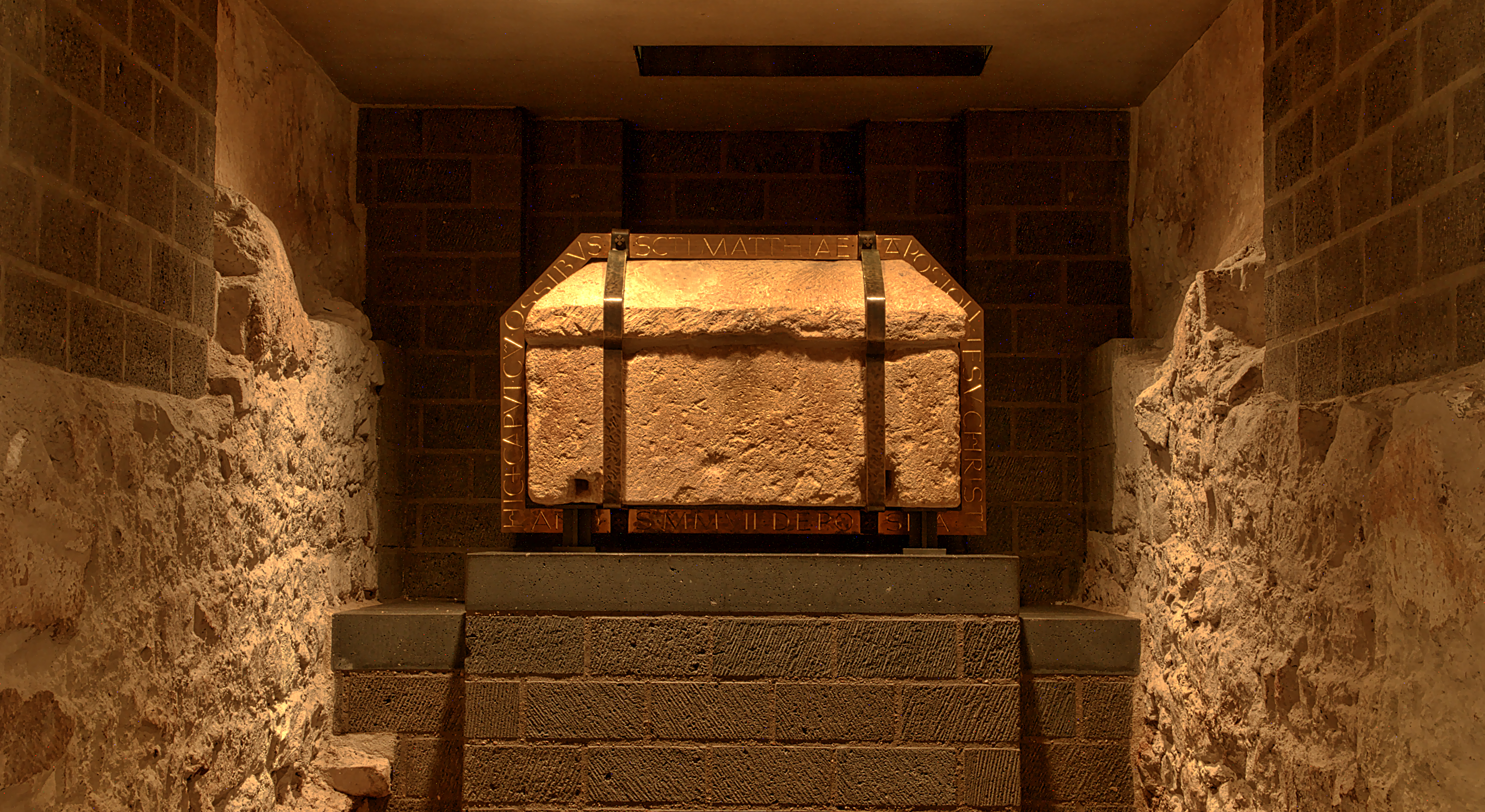
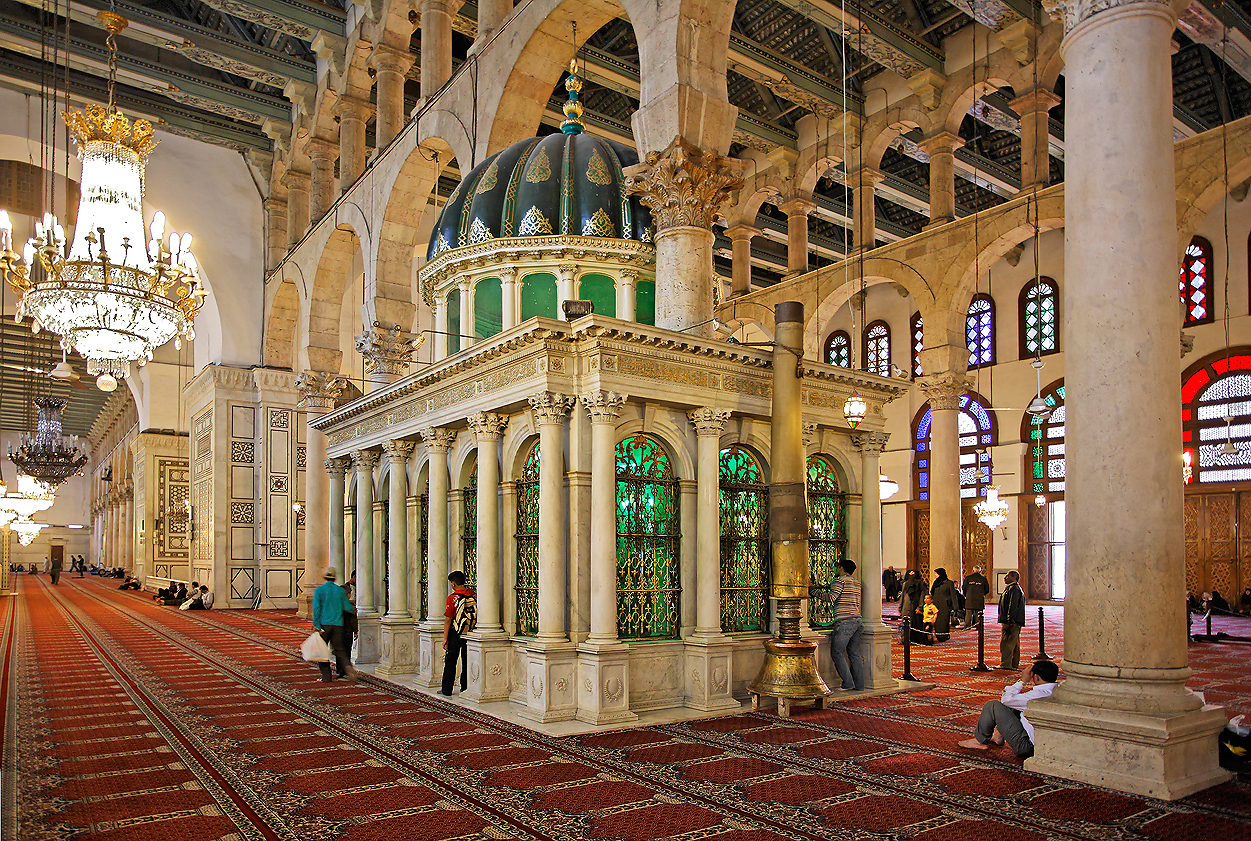
Biblical figure	Place name and location	Image	Notes
Augustus	Mausoleum of Augustus, Rome, Italy
Caiaphas	Tomb of Caiaphas, Abu Tor, Jerusalem		Discovered by accident in 1990 and subsequently excavated by archaeologists.
Herod the Great	Herodium, Za'atara and Jannatah, West Bank		Discovered in 2007 by archaeologist Ehud Netzer after 35 years of searching.
Saint Andrew	Cathedral of Saint Andrew, Patras, Greece
Saint Bartholemew	Benevento Cathedral, Benevento, Italy or San Bartolomeo all'Isola, Rome, Italy (bottom)		Both claimed to contain the relics of Saint Bartholomew.
Saint James the Great	Santiago de Compostela Cathedral, Santiago de Compostela, Spain
Saint James the Less	Cathedral of St. James, Jerusalem (top) or Santi Apostoli, Rome, Italy (bottom)
Saint Philip	Hierapolis, Pamukkale, Turkey (top) or Santi Apostoli, Rome, Italy (bottom)
Saint Paul	Basilica of Saint Paul Outside the Walls, Rome, Italy (top) or Archbasilica of Saint John Lateran (bottom)		Archbasilica of Saint John Lateran claims the skull of Paul.
Saint Peter	St. Peter's Basilica, Vatican City (top) or Archbasilica of Saint John Lateran (bottom) In Islam: Shrine of Prophet Shimoon, Chama, Lebanon		Archbasilica of Saint John Lateran claims the skull of Peter.
Saint Simon the Zealot and Saint Jude Thaddeus	St. Peter's Basilica, Vatican City		According to legend, Saint Simon and Saint Jude are buried underneath the St. Joseph altar.
Jesus	There are several sites that are claimed to be the Tomb of Jesus: The Aedicule, Church of the Holy Sepulchre, Jerusalem; The Garden Tomb, Jerusalem; Roza Bal, Srinagar, Kashmir
Saint Thomas	St. Thomas Cathedral Basilica, Chennai, India or Basilica of San Tommaso Apostolo, Ortona
Saint Matthias	St. Matthias' Abbey, Trier, Germany
John the Baptist	Umayyad Mosque, Damascus, Syria

- Basilica of St. John – original burial site of Saint John
- Akeldama, Jerusalem – Judas Iscariot
- Saint Mark's Coptic Orthodox Cathedral (Alexandria) – Saint Mark
- Tomb of the Virgin Mary (in Catholic tradition, Mary was assumed to heaven and has no tomb)
- Abbey of Santa Giustina – Saint Luke (body)
- St. Vitus Cathedral – Saint Luke (head)
- Thebes, Greece – Saint Luke (original burial ground; claimed to still hold one rib)
- Salerno Cathedral – Saint Matthew
- Tomb of Lazarus – Lazarus
- James Ossuary – claimed to hold the relics of James the Just
- Termoli Cathedral – Saint Timothy
- Saint Titus Cathedral, Heraklion – Saint Titus

== Figures mentioned exclusively in the Quran ==
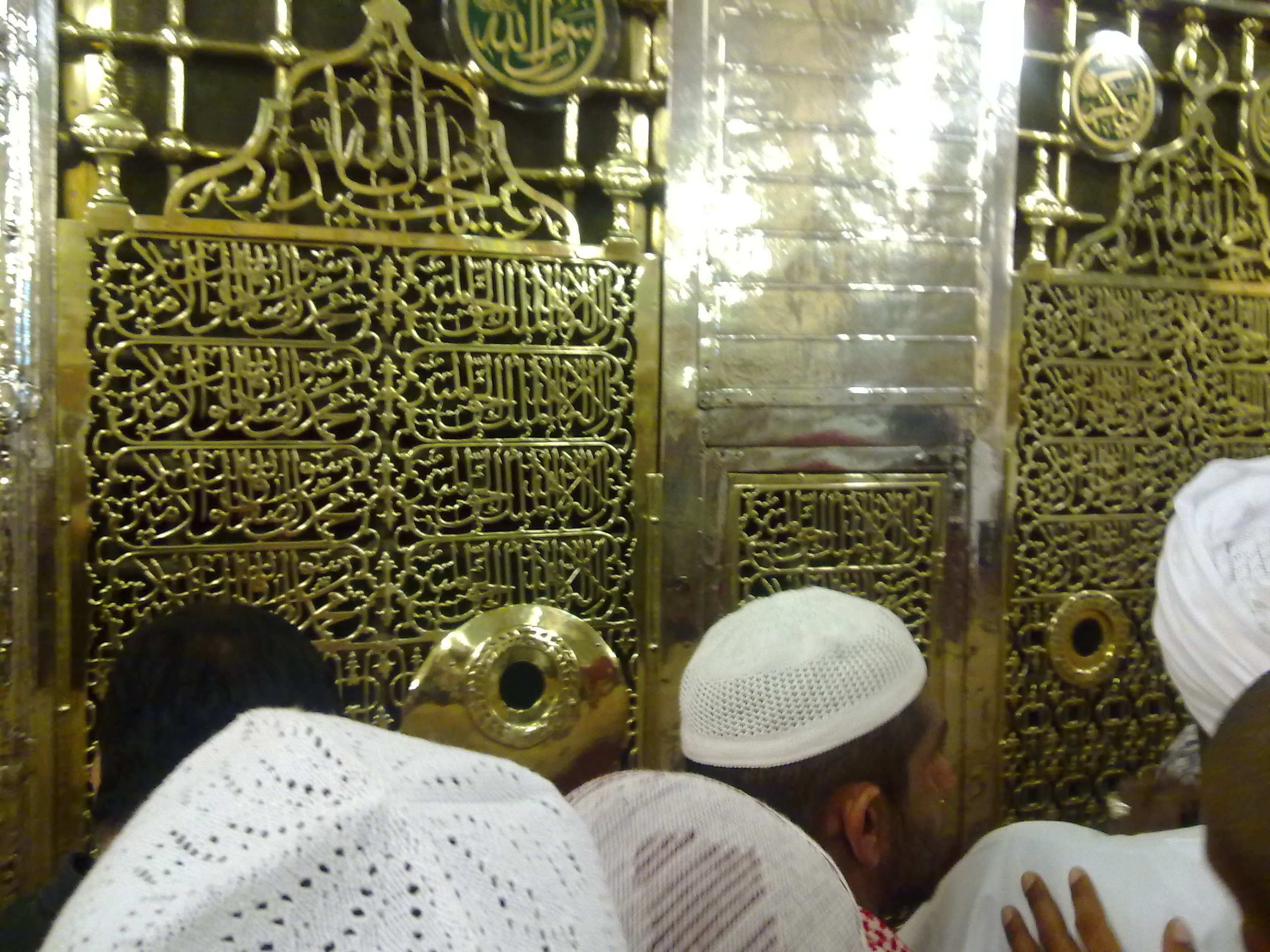
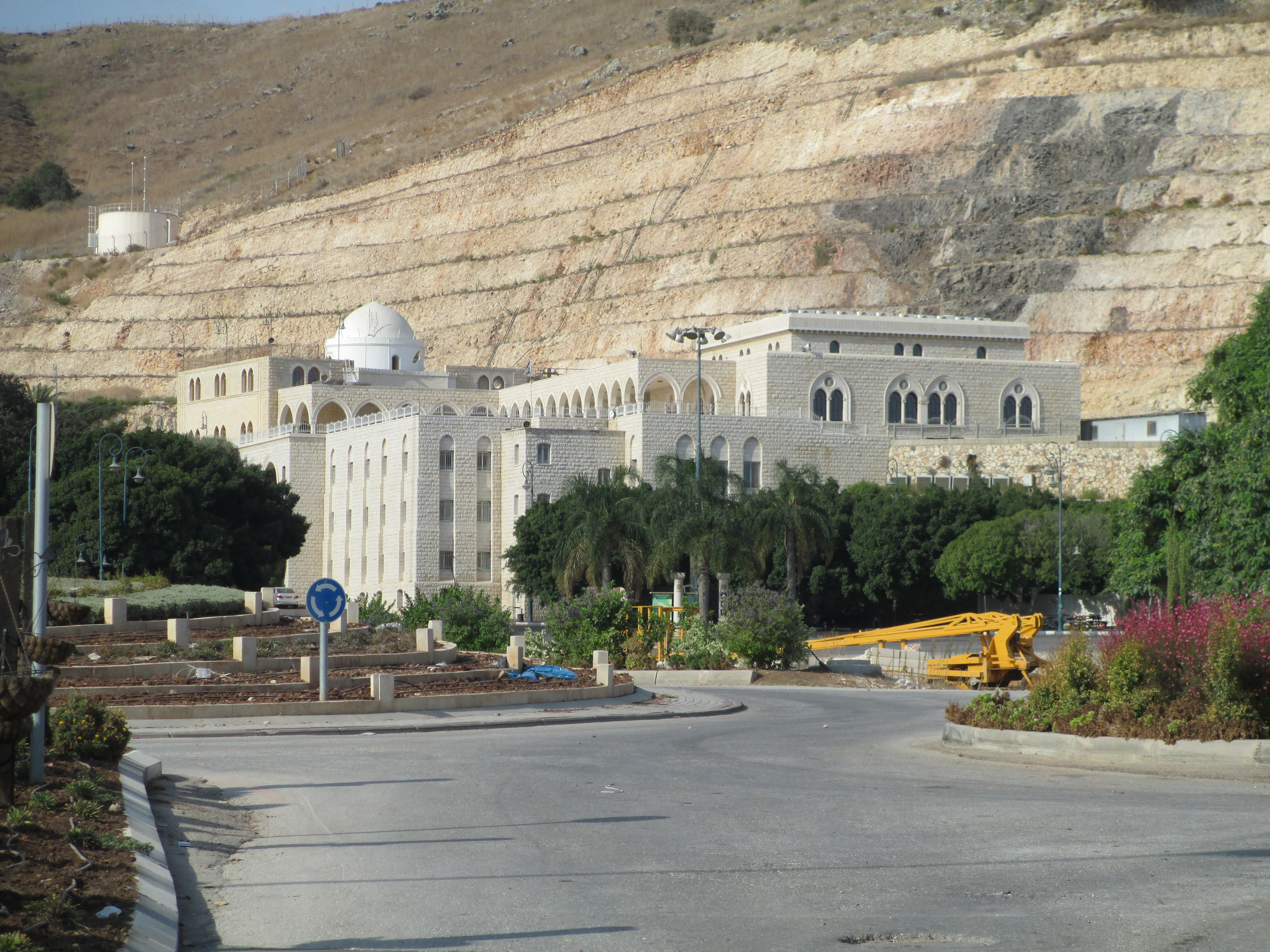
Quranic figure	Place name and location	Image	Notes
Muhammad	Al-Masjid an-Nabawi, Medina, Saudi Arabia		under Green Dome
Hud	Jordan, or Qabr Nabi Hud, Hadhramaut, Yemen		Burial sites near the Zamzam Well or in the Umayyad Mosque are also claimed
Shuaib	Nabi Shu'ayb, Galilee		Burial sites near Mahis, Jordan and Guriyeh, Iran are also claimed

== See also ==
- Burial places of founders of world religions
- List of artifacts in biblical archaeology
- List of Islamic prophets buried in Iran
- List of mausolea
- Lives of the Prophets
- Ohel (grave)
