= Lebanese Shia Muslims =

Lebanese adherents of Shia Islam

Lebanese Shia Muslims المسلمون الشيعة اللبنانيون
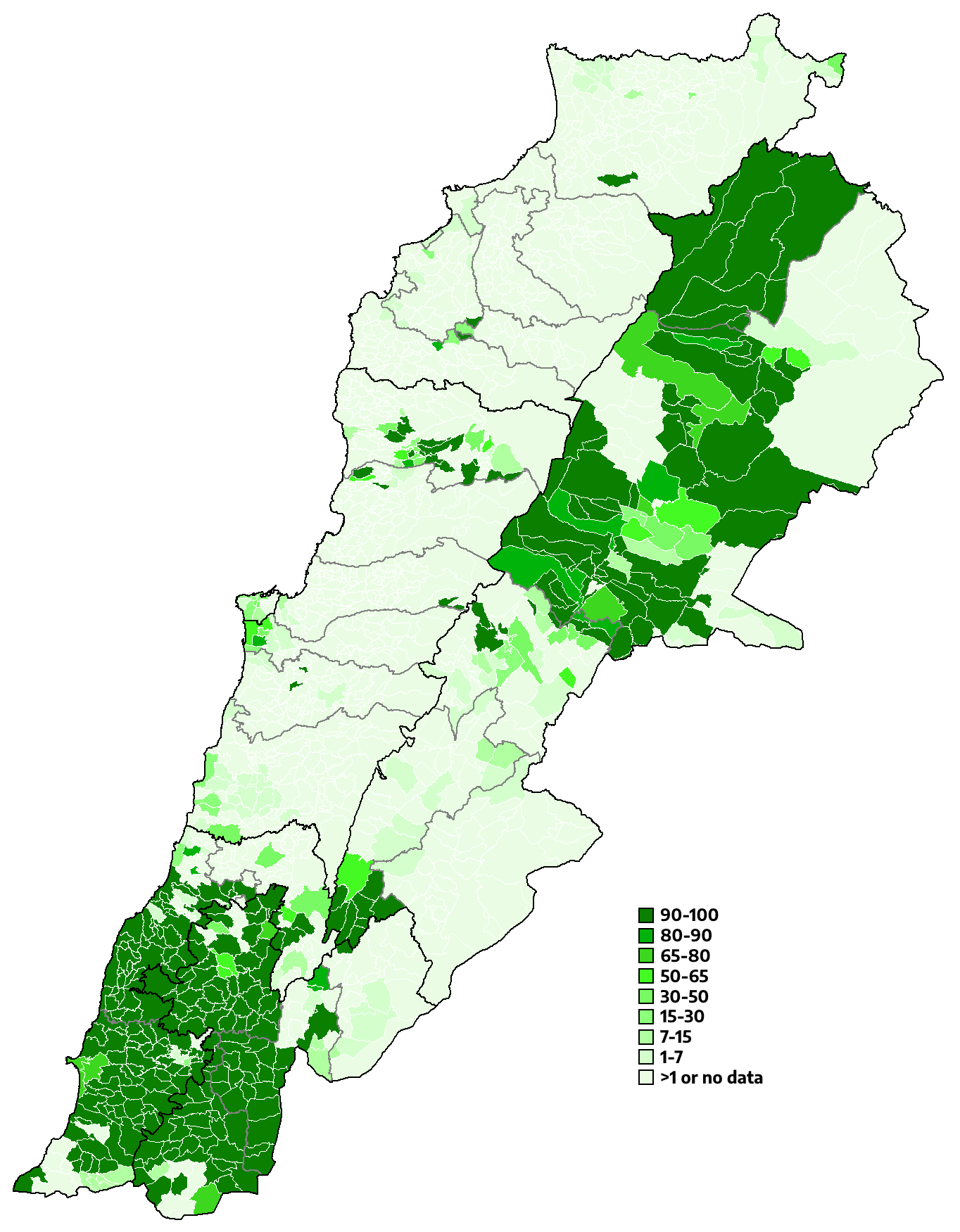
- Distribution of Shi'a Muslims in Lebanon

Total population
- ~1,600,000 (2005 estimate)

Languages
- Lebanese Arabic

Religion
- Twelver Shia Islam

Lebanese Shia Muslims (Arabic: المسلمون الشيعة اللبنانيون), historically also known as Matāwila (Arabic: متاولة, plural of متوالي mutawāli; pronounced as متوالي metouéle in Lebanese Arabic), are Lebanese people who are adherents of Shia Islam in Lebanon, which plays a major role alongside Lebanon's main Sunni, Maronite and Druze sects. Shia Muslims in Lebanon are synonymous with Twelver Shi'ism and are distinguished from Alawites and Isma'ilis.

As of 2020, Shia Muslims constitute around 31.2% of the Lebanese population per the CIA's World Factbook. Under the terms of an unwritten agreement known as the National Pact between the various political and religious leaders of Lebanon, shia are the only sect eligible for the post of Speaker of Parliament.

== History ==
=== Origins ===
Shi'i tradition traces the origins of the community in present-day Lebanon to Abu Dharr al-Ghifari, the prophet Muhammad's companion and a loyal associate of Ali. Information regarding Jabal Amel's population prior to the Muslim conquest is scant and insufficient. It is traditionally thought to have included a substantial tribal segment prior to the Muslim conquest represented by the tribe of Banu 'Āmila. According to Irfan Shahîd, the Banu 'Āmila formed part of the Nabataean foederati of the Romans, whose presence in the region dates back to Biblical times. According to 10th-century historian al-Tabari, they were also affiliates of the Ghassanids who supplied troops to the Byzantines. Galilee, which included a part of Jabal Amel, was inhabited by Christian and Jewish communities in the Byzantine period, divided along west and east respectively. Along the coast, Tyre was predominantly Christianized under the Byzantines with a minor survival of the pagan cult of Melqart up until the early Islamic period.

Shi'i elements appear to have been present in Tripoli and Sidon as early as the eighth century. Friedman notes that a Shi'i delegation from Palestine reportedly consulted the fifth Shia Imam, Muhammad al-Baqir (c. 712–733), in Kufa. Shi'i historian Al-Ya'qubi alludes to the settlement of 'Āmila in Palestine, which Friedman identifies as a Shi'ite tribe. During the early Islamic period, Jabal Amel and the adjacent areas likely hosted several disgruntled groups or communities that were susceptible to Twelver Shia doctrine, and a positive and inviting dialectical relationship between the theological construct of Imamism and its social milieu gave precedence to the Shiite possibility. Al-Muhajir traces the beginning of this process to the aftermath of the Hasan–Muawiya treaty of 661, while Rula Abisaad and Yaron Friedman argue that Banu 'Āmila may have already been Shiites in the seventh century. Harris further observes that the 842 revolt in Palestine gave rare exposure to a Shia-minded population on the fringes of Mount Lebanon.

In Mount Lebanon, the Twelver Shiites of Kisrawan were geographically separate from Jabal Amel. Harris suggests that Shia tribespeople may have settled the region as early as the Umayyad period, or following the Munaytra uprising of 759, and were likely well established there by the tenth century. By contrast, al-Muhajir dates the community's founding to the aftermath of the First Crusade (c. 1097–1099) and the fall of Tripoli in 1109, which triggered the displacement of the city's Shia population.

=== Early Islamic period ===
Aleppo, which figures in the scholastic heritage of Jabal Amel, had become fertile ground for Twelver Shi'ism under the reign of the Hamdanids (c. 944–991), and cultural and material interactions between Aleppo and Jabal Amel may have reinforced nascent local development of Twelver Shi'ism prior to Isma'ili Fatimid ascent in Egypt (c. 969). Before Fatimid Ismaili da'wa took hold in Syria, cultural exchange between scholars in Jabal Amel and Iraq contributed to a mutual systematic observation of the Ja'fari school, which also continued after Fatimid demise. Among the earliest examples of this 'Amili-Iraqi exchange is an elegy by Tyrian Shi'i poet 'Abd al-Muhsin al-Ṣūri (Arabic: عبد المحسن الصوري, c. 948–1028) in memory of Twelver theologian al-Shaykh al-Mufid (c. 948–1022). Sharif al-Murtada (c. 965–1044), the foremost Imami authority of his era, based in Baghdad, composed several treatises known as the masā'il in response to legal inquiries from the ulama (jurists) of Sidon, Tripoli, and Tiberias. His son-in-law, Abu Ya'la al-Ja'fari (d. 1070), likewise corresponded with Shi'i ulama of Sidon.

The Hamdanids also patronized Alawite (historically called Nusayri) da'wah, a ghulat Twelver group, whose adherents were numerous in Jund al-Urdunn (which includes present-day southern Lebanon) at the time of Ibn Hazm al-Andalusi (c. 994–1064). Its followers were reportedly present in Tyre, Tripoli, Sidon and Beirut along the coast; in the city of Tiberias in the Galilee, and in Banias in the Mt. Hermon-Golan region. Per Stefan Winter, Alawite communities largely disappeared outside of Syria after the 12th century, and presumably melded into mainstream Imami Shi'ism.

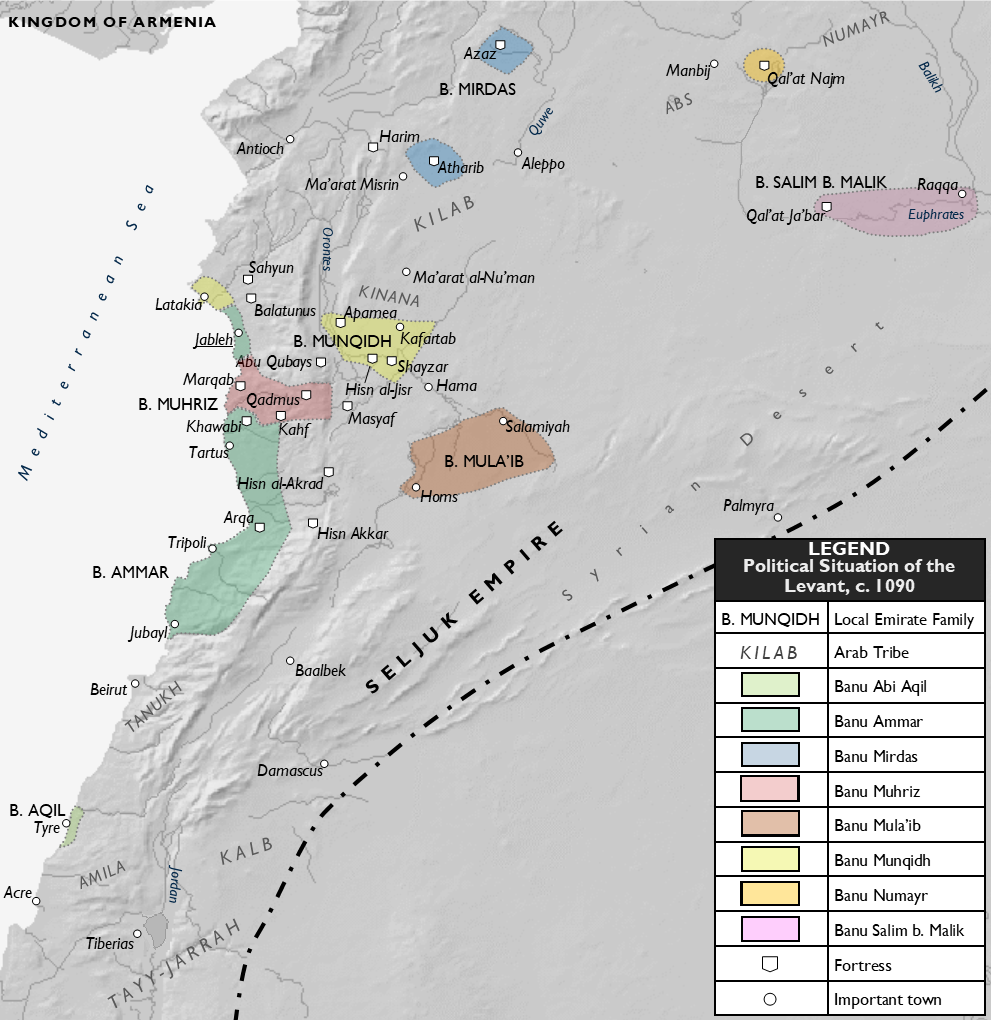
Political map of the Levant, circa 1085, highlighting the territories of Banu Ammar in Tripoli

In his book, Palestinian geographer al-Muqaddasī (c. 966-985) documented Shi'i Muslim communities in Qadas, Tiberias, Amman and Nablus. In the course of his travels through Tyre and Tripoli in 1047, Nasir Khusraw recorded in his Safarnama that the majority of the two cities' inhabitants were Shi'is. According to Ibn al-Arabi of Seville (c. 1092–1095), the Palestinian littoral cities were home to sizable Shi'i communities. During his ten-year residence in Tyre, Ibn Asakir (c. 1106–1175), noted strong opposition to his views from some of the rafida in the city, a pejorative term denoting Shiites.

On the other hand, Tripoli was governed on the Fatimids' behalf by Banu Ammar, a Twelver Shi'i qadi dynasty who invested large sums in turning the city into a famous center for learning, until the fall of Tripoli in 1109. Tripoli became a reputed centre of Imami Shi'i scholarship, producing reputed scholars such as Ibn al-Barraj al-Tarabulsi (Arabic: إبن البرّاج الطرابلسي, c. 1008–1088), a student of Sharif al-Murtada and Shaykh Tusi who was appointed the judge of Tripoli in 1046, and commanded a large Shiite hinterland, where the district name 'Zanniya' still recalls the Alid esotericism of its medieval population.

=== Mamluk period ===
Jabal Amel provided refuge for Shia communities, offering relative safety from Sunni rule and intermittent persecution, especially following the restoration of Sunni dominance in the Levant after the fall of Frankish rule. It became an important centre of Shiite scholarship during the Mamluk period, probably as the result of short-distance immigration from the former Frankish coastal cities which were destroyed by Mamluks, namely Tyre, Sidon and Akka. When the Mamluks established a mamlaka (province) in Safed in 1260s, Shiites in the Safed region either joined neighboring Jabal Amel or converted to Sunni Islam. The towns of Jezzine, Karak Nuh and Machghara emerged as centers of Shiite learning, and Shiite scholars enjoyed protection under Shia chiefs starting from Husam ad-Din Bishara in 1187. One particular scholar from Jezzine, Muhammad ibn Makki (c. 1334–1385), became a widely known Shi'i faqīh who advocated developing religious law through debate with Sunni scholars, and instructed the court of Khorasan's reigning Sarbadar in Twelver Shiism.

Between 1292 and 1305, the Mamluks carried out a series of punitive expeditions against the Shia community in the Kisrawan region in Mount Lebanon east of Beirut, headed by Aqqush al-Afram. According to Mamluk chronicler Badr al-Din al-Ayni, in 1292, the Sultan al-Ashraf Khalil compelled Baydara to take three thousand cavalry up the coast from Egypt, entering Kisrawan from the south. According to al-Ayni, the defenders, whom he called kafarat rawafid, mobilized 10,000 men who lured Mamluk contingents into ambushes. The campaign was a failure, and Baydara was only able to extricate his troops after offering gifts and releasing prisoners. In 1299, Kisrawanis attacked the fleeing Mamluk army, which brought Kisrawan back to Mamluk priority, prompting a swift retribution in 1300.

Following the death of the Ilkhan Ghazan in 1304, the Mamluks assembled the main Mamluk field army for a third campaign. In July 1305, according to al-Maqrizi, al-Ayni and Druze chronicler Salih ibn Yahya, fifty thousand Mamluk troops marched from Damascus to meet up with another army under the na'ib of Tripoli coming from the north, also summoning their Druze Buhturid allies to the south. The Mamluk pincer movement converged on the Kisrawan rebels and broke their forces at 'Ayn Sawfar, resulting in battles that eventually crushed the Kisrawanis. The Mamluks then devastated villages and cultivation through August 1305 and expelled much of the population, who settled in Southern Lebanon and the Beqaa valley. Estimates of the expelled population vary, with Muhammad Ali Makki estimating likely around 20,000 displaced into the Bekaa valley and Jezzine.

=== Under Ottoman rule ===
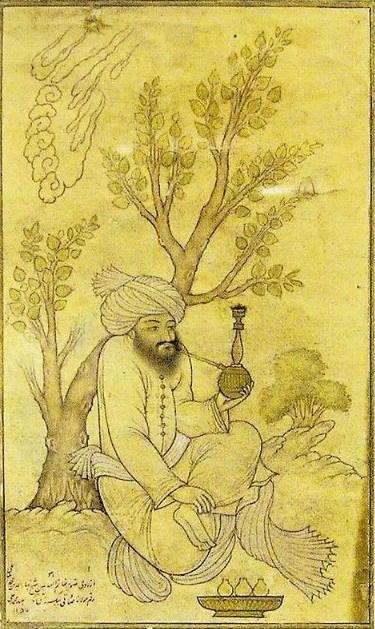
An 18th century copy of a miniature depicting Sheikh Baha'uddin al-Amili

After the Ottoman conquest circa 1516, various Shiite clans in Jabal Amel, Beqaa Valley and Mount Lebanon, which had been ensconced prior to Ottoman arrival, were co-opted into the Ottoman provincial administration as mukataacıs or as governors of secondary sanjaks with fiscal and police responsibilities over a vast section of the Syrian coastal highlands. The Harfushes of Baalbek received the iltizam concession for the Bekaa as well as a rank in the provincial military hierarchy. In the province of Tripoli, the Hamada clan were charged with multiple tax collection assignments in the hinterland of Mount Lebanon. Further south, the Shiites of Jabal Amel retained their tax farms well into the mid-18th century, greatly benefiting from the foreign demand for dyed cotton and good commercial contacts with the French, and by the 1750s the area provided more tax revenues than Mount Lebanon.

By the late 18th century, traditional Shiite feudatories had largely become redundant and weak, to which the Ottomans enlisted other families. The Shihab dynasty managed to displace the Shia Hamades from Mount Lebanon by the 1760s, exploited Harfush internal quarrels in the Bekaa and enroached on Jabal Amel. The Druze Junblatt lords and Christian peasants bought or pushed out the Shia out of Jezzine and the hills above Sidon, while the significant Shia minority in the Tripoli hills largely departed for the Bekaa valley. In the late 18th century, Jabal Amel became a war zone between Ottoman authorities and rebels in northern Palestine, which continued under Jazzar Pasha (c. 1781–1805) and against the Egyptians in 1833–1841. The Shia population, estimated around 38% of Lebanon's population a few centuries prior, slid to no more than 20% by 1840.

==== Relations with Safavid Iran ====
During this time period, Shiites built particularly close ties with the Safavids of Iran, contributing significantly to the empire's conversion into Shia Islam. Tahmasp I (1524–1576) appointed Muhaqqiq al-Karaki from Karak Nuh as the deputy of the Hidden Imam, and granted him extensive power over the sadrs (Grand viziers) in a prolix edict in 1533. Tahmasp reportedly told him: "You are the real king and I am just one of your agents". This brought new political and court power to the Islamic clerics and their networks, intersecting Tabriz, Qazvin, Isfahan, Rasht, Astarabad, and Amol. Another prominent cleric was Baha'uddin al-Amili, who authored mathematical and astronomical treatises, including the possibility of the Earth's movement prior to the spread of the Copernican theory, and is responsible for many architectural feats in the city of Isfahan.

=== French mandate period ===
With the Ottoman withdrawal in 1918, the French entered Nabatieh and barred the local populace from carrying out political activity. Local chiefs rejected the demand, and instead hoisted the Arab flag in several villages. Shiites participated in the Syrian nationalist movement and Syrian National Congress in 1919, and prominent Shiites such as Ahmad Rida often stated their support for Syrian unity and independence within the Kingdom of Syria, emphasizing their Arab identity, while simultaneously defending Shiite particularism.

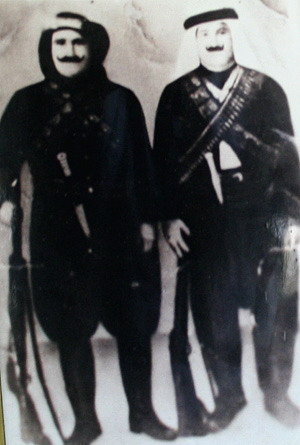
Adham Khanjar and Sadiq Hamzeh, two prominent anti-French revolutionary figures

Following the official declaration of the Arab Kingdom of Syria in March 1920, anti-French riots and clashed broke out in the predominantly Shia areas of Jabal Amel and the Beqaa Valley. Rebels attacked French military bases and garrisons in their areas, and sectarian clashes also took place, notably in Ain Ebel, due to French arming and their perceived acceptance of French mandatory rule. The French sent an expedition of 4,000–6,000 soldiers led by Colonel Niger to the south in an effort to pacify the Shiite rebels, devastating their villages and crushing Shiite rebels by June 1920. The defeat dispersed thousands of peasants who feared harsh reprisals, and the high fines imposed on the villagers contributed to financial hardship in the region.

The armed effort was paralleled by the nonviolent resistance movement led by Abdul Husayn Sharafeddine since 1919, who demanded US support for Syrian unity during the King–Crane Commission visit. This angered the French, who encouraged an unsuccessful assassination attempt against him. Sharafeddine strongly denounced sectarian hostility as it only gave purpose for the French military presence. During the famous the conference of Wadi al-Hujayr on 24 April 1920, he called for the protection of Christians.

The Christians (Nasara) are your brethren in the country and in destiny. Show to them the love you show to yourselves. Protect their lives and possessions as you do to your own. Only by this can you face the conspiracy and put an end to the civil strife.

However, Sharafeddine's call for unity and coexistence went unheard because while delegates from the Shia Conference of El-Hujair were in Damascus swearing allegiance to King Faisal, a Shia gang led by Mahmoud Bazzi, attacked Ain Ebel and other Christian villages on 5 May 1920, pillaging and killing more than 50 people. It appears that the gangs may have been responding to a call for jihad, though it is unclear which side issued it.

This period of unrest ended in 1921 with a political amnesty offered by the French mandate authorities for all Shiite rebels who had taken part in the fighting, with the intention to bind the Shia community in Lebanon to the new Mandate state. When the Great Syrian Revolt broke out in 1925, the calm remained in Jabal Amel. Nevertheless, many Shiites joined the rebels in Syria, and played a central role in the battles of the Qalamoun Mountains and Akroum, where Shiites reportedly took a booty of more than 400 rifles and fifty horses from French forces. Many Christians who fled their villages during the revolt were accommodated by Shia notables from Nabatieh and Bint Jbeil, an act that was appreciated by the local Christian clergy.

What the Shi'ites did for the Christians in the south will be cherished in our hearts for as long as Lebanon and the Christians remain. What happened should be written in gold. Long live Lebanon, Long live Lebanese unity and long live the Shiites.

The region experienced a decade of stability following the revolt. Shiites had become largely accepting of Greater Lebanon for sectarian and non-sectarian reasons, and the establishment of the Ja'fari court further strengthened communal ties and validated a sense of particularism otherwise denied under the Ottomans. Under Ottoman rule, Shiʿi Muslims were not treated as a distinct legal community and had to submit to Hanafi Sunni courts for official matters, limiting the recognition of their own religious practices. Consequently, the establishment of Ja'fari shari'a courts during the French Mandate period in Lebanon complicated the understanding of citizenship by intertwining it with sectarian identification, while also reinforcing sectarian divisions within the legal and political framework of the nation-state. Instead of armed rebellion and uprisings, protests and civil strikes in Shia areas became the medium to protest French policies and tobacco prices. Shiites were later active in providing ammunition, manpower and assistance to Palestinian rebels during the 1936–1939 revolt in Palestine, which was co-administered from Bint Jbeil.

==== Education ====
In the 19th century, Lebanon saw dramatic changes when missionaries started establishing schools throughout the country. While the French and Russians mainly encouraged Maronite and Orthodox active learning respectively, along with American Protestant missions in Beirut, the British established educational institutions in Druze areas, and Sunnis mainly benefitted from Ottoman state institutions. However, Shiites were the only ones who did not benefit from such activities. This neglectance continued into the early days of the French mandate.

During the 1920s and 1930s, educational institutions became places for different religious communities to construct nationalist and sectarian modes of identification. Shia leaders and religious clergy supported educational reforms in order to improve the social and political marginalization of the Shia community and increase their involvement in the newly born nation-state of Lebanon. This led to the establishment of several private Shia schools in Lebanon, among them The Charitable Islamic ʿĀmili Society (al-Jamʿiyya al-Khayriyya al-Islāmiyya al-ʿĀmiliyya) in Beirut and The Charitable Jaʿfari Society (al-Jamʿiyya al-Khayriyya al-Jaʿfariyya) in Tyre. While several Shia educational institutions were established before and at the beginning of the mandate period, they often ran out of support and funding which resulted in their abolishment.

The primary outlet for discussions concerning educational reforms among Shia scholars was the monthly Shiite journal al-'Irfan, founded in 1909. In order to bring their demands (muṭālabiyya) to the attention of the French authorities, petitions were signed and presented to the French High Commissioner and the Service de l'Instruction Publique. This institution – since 1920 headquartered in Beirut- oversaw every educational policy regarding public and private school in the mandate territories. According to historian Elizabeth Thompson, private schools were part of "constant negotiations" between citizen and the French authorities in Lebanon, specifically regarding the hierarchical distribution of social capital along religious communal lines. During these negotiations, petitions were often used by different sects to demand support for reforms. For example, the middle-class of predominantly urban Sunni areas expressed their demands for educational reforms through petitions directed towards the French High Commissioner and the League of Nations.

Sayyid Abdul-Husayn Sharafeddine believed that the only way to ward off foreign political influence was to establish modern schools while maintaining Islamic teachings. In 1938, he built two schools, one for girls and another for boys, at his own expense. However, the girls' school did not last long due to financial difficulties and traditional views, prompting Sayyid Sharafeddine to transfer the girls and teach them in his own home. The boys' school was known as al-Ja'fariyya, and was able to continue despite financial difficulties.

==== Ja'fari shari'a courts ====
Under the Ottoman Empire, Shia Muslims had never been recognized as a distinct religious group and had thus never been granted religious rights. In January 1926, the French High Commissioner officially recognized the Shia community as an "independent religious community," which was permitted to judge matters of personal status "according to the principles of the rite known by the name of Ja'fari." This meant that the Shiite Ja'fari jurisprudence or madhhab was legally recognized as an official madhhab, and held judicial and political power on multiple levels. The recognition of Ja‘fari jurisprudence in legal affairs further reinforced Lebanon’s sectarian divisions at the political level, as it provided the Shiite community with a degree of autonomy within the Lebanese nation-state. However, at the individual level, sectarian boundaries became more fluid and subject to interpretation, as people frequently shifted their sectarian affiliation to gain legal benefits from different madhhabs. Though established in Lebanon, Shiite individuals from neighbouring countries also presented their marriage and divorce cases to the Ja'fari courts, as religious identity overrode national identity. Because the courts adjudicated matters of marriage, divorce, custody, and inheritance, their rulings also shaped gendered aspects of citizenship and family law within the emerging Lebanese state. Furthermore, the institutionalization of Shia Islam during this period provoked discussions between Shiite scholars and clergy about how Shiite orthodoxy should be defined. For example, discussions about the mourning of the martyrdom of Imam Husain during Ashura, which was a clandestine affair before the 1920s and 1930s, led to its transformation into a public ceremony.

On the other hand, the official recognition of legal and religious Shiite institutions by the French authorities strengthened a sectarian awareness within the Shia community. Historian Max Weiss underlines how "sectarian claims were increasingly bound up with the institutionalization of Shi'i difference." With the Ja'fari shari'a courts in practice, the Shia community was deliberately encouraged to "practice sectarianism" on a daily basis. With their separate system for personal status law, the Shia community was politically integrated into the Lebanese nation-state based on sectarian lines.

== Sub-groups ==
=== Shia Twelvers (Metouali) ===
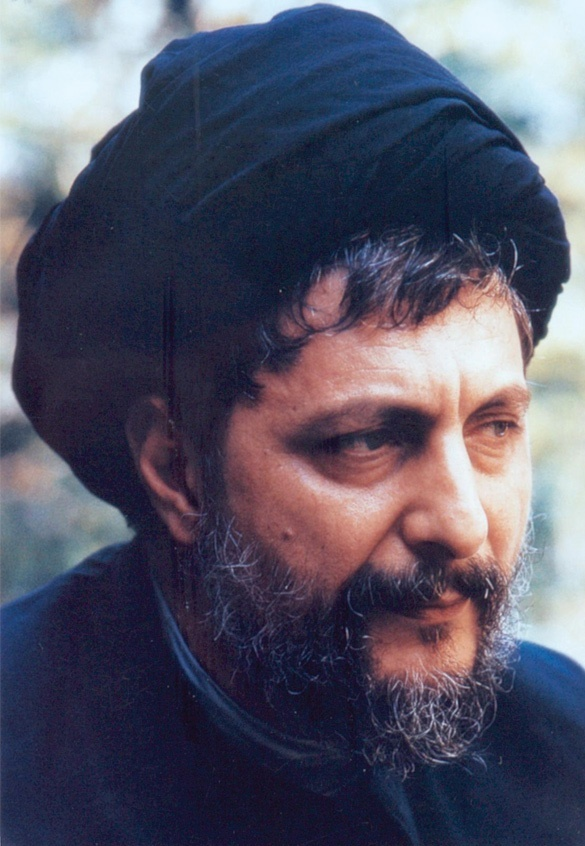
Sayyid Musa al-Sadr, an Iranian-born Lebanese Shia cleric, reformer, and political leader who became the foremost advocate for Lebanon’s Shia community, promoting interfaith dialogue, social justice, and unity.

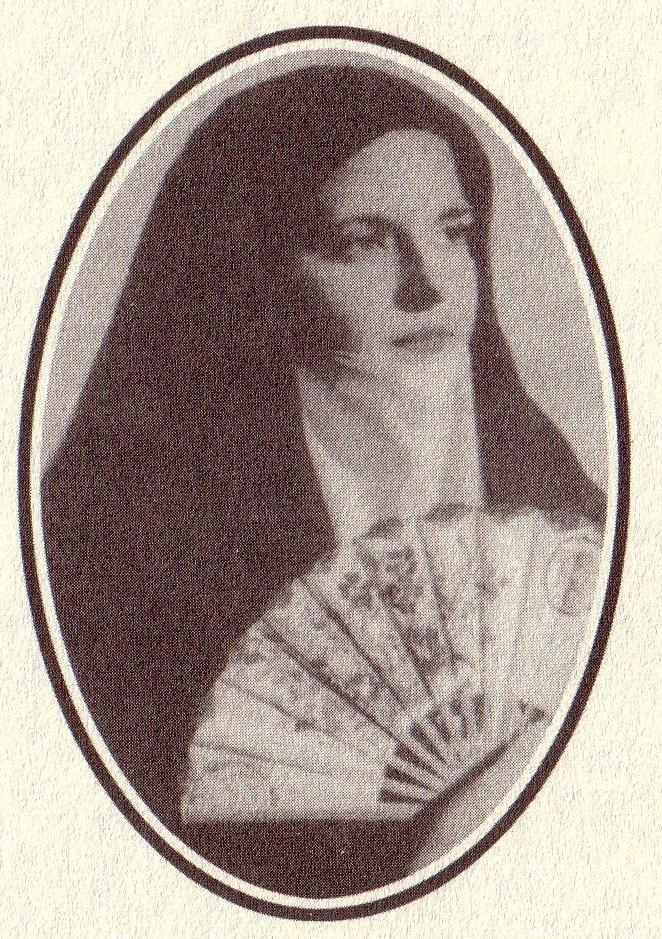
Zaynab Fawwaz, a Lebanese Shia women's rights activist, novelist and poet.

The jurisdiction of the Ottoman Empire was nominal in Lebanon. In the 18th century, Baalbek was under the control of the Metawali, the local Twelver Shi'a community. Metawali, Metouali, or Mutawili was a title to distinguish the uniqueness and unity of the local Twelver community and originally referred to a trustee in the waqf system, and was mainly used after the 18th century.

Seven Mutawali villages that were reassigned from Greater Lebanon to the Mandatory Palestine in a 1924 border-redrawing agreement were forcibly depopulated during the 1948 Arab-Israeli War and repopulated by Jews. The seven villages are Qadas, al-Nabi Yusha', al-Malkiyya, Hunin, Tarbikha, Abil al-Qamh, and Saliha. The inhabitants, in turn, fled to Lebanon.

In addition, the Mutawali have close links to the Syrian Twelver community.

=== Alawites ===
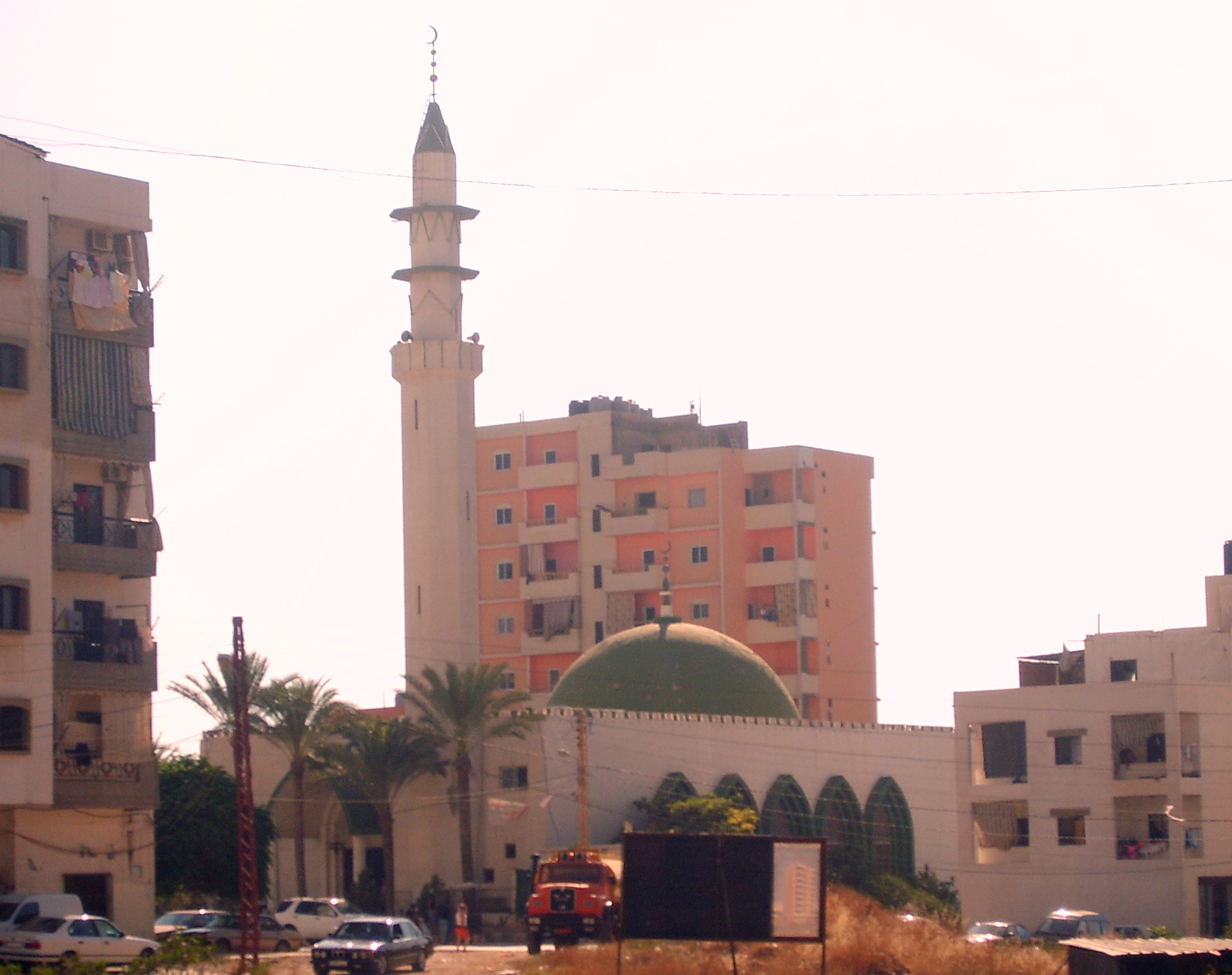
Alawite el-Zahra Mosque in Jabal Mohsen in Tripoli, Lebanon

There are approximately 100,000 to 120,000 Alawites in Lebanon, where they have lived since at least the 16th century. They are recognized as one of the 18 official Lebanese sects, and due to the efforts of an Alawite leader Ali Eid, the Taif Agreement of 1989 gave them two reserved seats in the Parliament. Lebanese Alawites live mostly in the Jabal Mohsen neighbourhood of Tripoli, and in ten villages in the Akkar District, and are mainly represented by the Arab Democratic Party. The Bab al-Tabbaneh–Jabal Mohsen conflict between pro-Syrian Alawites and anti-Syrian Lebanese Sunni Muslims have haunted Tripoli for decades. There is also the Alawite village Ghajar, which is split between south Lebanon and the Israeli-occupied Golan Heights, and has a population of 2000.

=== Isma'ilis ===
Isma'ilism, or Sevener Shi'ism, is a branch of Shia Islam which emerged in 765 from a disagreement over the succession to Muhammad. Isma'ilis hold that Isma'il ibn Ja'far was the seventh imam, not Musa al-Kadhim as Twelvers believe. Isma'ilism also differs doctrinally from Twelver Shi'ism, having beliefs and practices that are more esoteric and maintaining seven pillars of faith rather than the Twelver uṣūl al-dīn and Ancillaries of the Faith.

Though perhaps somewhat better established in neighbouring Syria, where the faith founded one of its first da'wah outposts in the city of Salamiyah (the supposed resting place of Imam Isma'il) in the eighth century, it has been present in what is now Lebanon for centuries. Early Lebanese Isma'ilism showed perhaps an unusual propensity to foster radical movements within it, particularly in the areas of Wadi al-Taym adjoining the Beqaa valley at the foot of Mount Hermon, and Jabal Shuf in the highlands of Mount Lebanon.

The syncretic beliefs of the Qarmatians, typically classed as an Isma'ili splinter sect with Zoroastrian influences, spread into the area of the Beqaa valley and possibly also Jabal Shuf starting in the 9th century. The group soon became widely vilified in the Islamic world for its armed campaigns across throughout the following decades, which included slaughtering Muslim pilgrims and sacking Mecca and Medina—and Salamiyah. Other Muslim rulers soon acted to crush this powerful heretical movement. In the Levant, the Qarmatians were ordered to be stamped out by the Fatimid Caliphate, themselves Isma'ilis, and from whom the lineage of the Aga Khan, the head of Nizari Isma'ilism, is claimed to descend. The Qarmatian movement in the Levant was largely extinguished by the turn of the millennium.

The semi-divine personality of the Fatimid caliph in Isma'ilism was elevated further in the doctrines of a secretive group which began to venerate the caliph Hakim as the embodiment of tawhid (monotheism). Unsuccessful in the imperial capital of Cairo, they began discreetly proselytising around the year 1017 among certain Arab tribes in the Levant. The Isma'ilis of Wadi al-Taym and Jabal Shuf were among those who converted before the movement was permanently closed off a few decades later to guard against outside prying by mainstream Sunni and Shia Muslims, who often viewed their doctrines as heresy. This deeply esoteric group became known as the Druze, who in belief, practice, and history have long since become distinct from Isma'ilis proper. Druze constitute 5.2% of the modern population of Lebanon and still have a strong demographic presence in their traditional regions within the country to this day.

Due to official persecution by the Sunni Zengid dynasty that stoked escalating sectarian clashes with Sunnis, many Isma'ilis in the regions of Damascus and Aleppo are said to have fled west during the 12th century. Some settled in the mountains of Lebanon, while others settled further north along the Syrian Coastal Mountain Range, where the Alawites had earlier taken refuge—and where their brethren in the Assassins were cultivating a fearsome reputation as they staved off armies of Crusaders and Sunnis alike for many years.

Once more numerous and widespread in many areas now part of Lebanon, the Isma'ili population has largely vanished over time. It has been suggested that Ottoman-era persecution might have spurred them to leave for elsewhere in the region, though there is no record or evidence of any large exodus.

Isma'ilis were originally included as one of five officially defined Muslim sects in a 1936 edict issued by the French Mandate governing religious affairs in the territory of Greater Lebanon, alongside Sunnis, Twelver Shiites, Alawites, and Druzes. However, Muslims collectively rejected being classified as divided, and so were left out of the law in the end. Ignored in a post-independence law passed in 1951 that defined only Judaism and Christian sects as official, Muslims continued under traditional Ottoman law, within the confines of which small communities like Isma'ilis and Alawites found it difficult to establish their own institutions.

The Aga Khan IV made a brief stop in Beirut on 4 August 1957 while on a global tour of Nizari Isma'ili centres, drawing an estimated 600 Syrian and Lebanese followers of the religion to the Beirut Airport in order to welcome him. In the mid-1980s, several hundred Isma'ilis were thought to still live in a few communities scattered across several parts of Lebanon. Though they are nominally counted among the 18 officially recognised sects under modern Lebanese law, they currently have no representation in state functions and continue to lack personal status laws for their sect, which has led to increased conversions to established sects to avoid the perpetual inconveniences this produces.

War in the region has also caused pressures on Lebanese Isma'ilis. In the 2006 Lebanon War, Israeli warplanes bombed the factory of the Maliban Glass company in the Beqaa valley on 19 July. The factory was bought in the late 1960s by the Madhvani Group under the direction of Isma'ili entrepreneur Abdel-Hamid al-Fil after the Aga Khan personally brought the two into contact. It had expanded over the next few decades from an ailing relic to the largest glass manufacturer in the Levant, with 300 locally hired workers producing around 220,000 tons of glass per day. Al-Fil closed the plant down on 15 July just after the war broke out to safeguard against the deaths of workers in the event of such an attack, but the damage was estimated at a steep 55 million US dollars, with the reconstruction timeframe indefinite due to instability and government hesitation.

== Geographic distribution within Lebanon ==
Lebanese Shia Muslims are concentrated in south Beirut and its southern suburbs, northern and western area of the Beqaa Valley, as well as Southern Lebanon.

== Demographics ==
Lebanese Shia Muslims
Year	Percent
1921	17.2%
1932	19.6%
1975	26.2%
1988	32.8%
2022	31.2%

Note that the following percentages are estimates only. However, in a country that had last census in 1932, it is difficult to have correct population estimates.

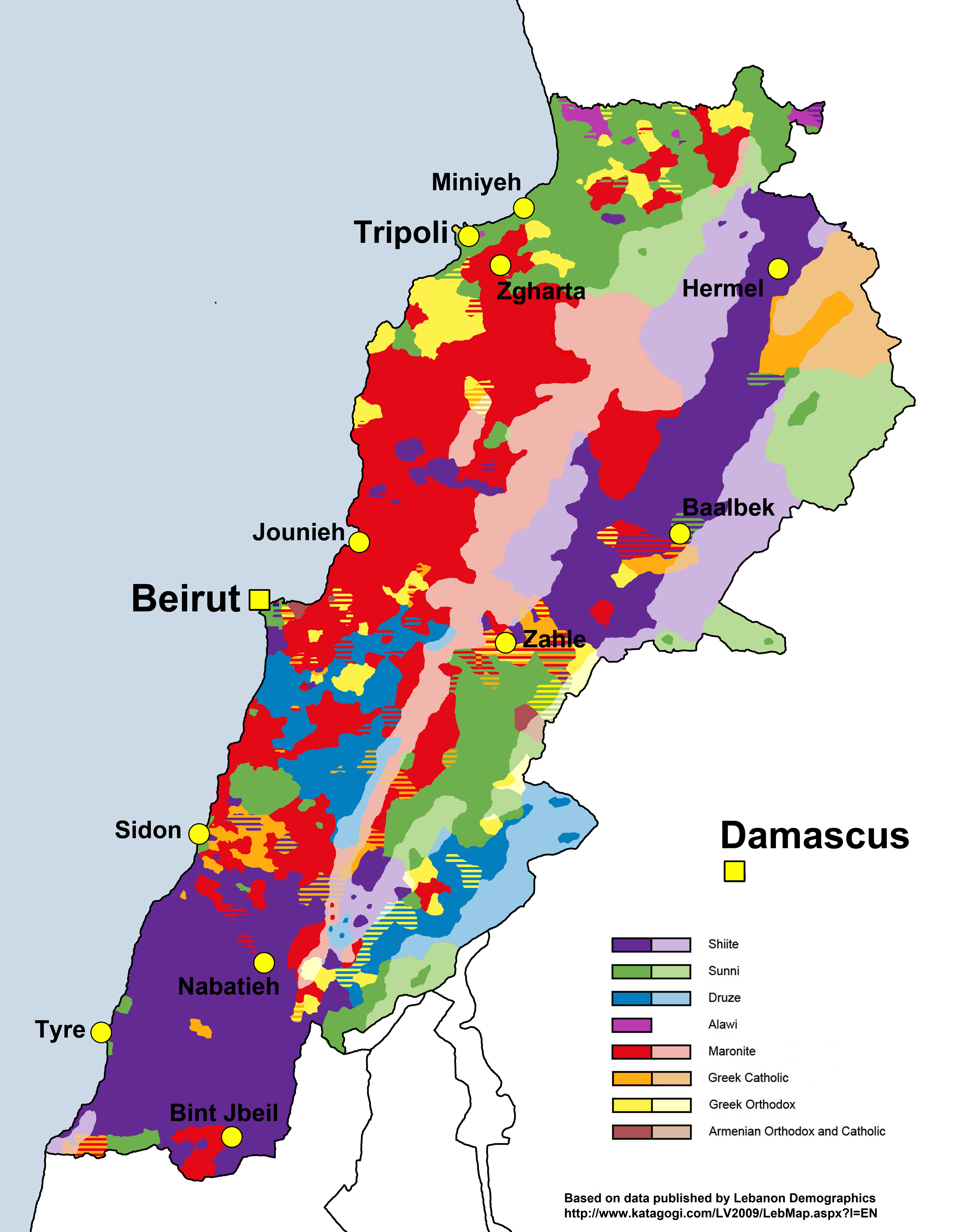
The distribution of Lebanon's religious groups

A census in 1921 put the numbers of Shiites at 17.2% (104,947 of 609,069). The last official census in Lebanon in 1932 put the numbers of Shiites at 19.6% of the population (154,208 of 785,543). A study done by the Central Intelligence Agency (CIA) in 1985 put the numbers of Shiites at 41% of the population (919,000 of 2,228,000). More recently, the CIA World Factbook estimated that Shia Muslims constitute 31.2% of Lebanon's population in 2022.

Between 1921 and 1988, Shiites maintained the highest fertility rate of all communities, contributing to a rapid increase from 17% to 32%.

Percentage growth of the Lebanese Shia Muslim population (other sources est.)
Year	Shiite Population	Total Lebanese Population	Percentage
1921	104,947	609,069	17.2%
1932	154,208	785,543	19.6%
1956	250,605	1,407,868	17.8%
1975	668,500	2,550,000	26.2%
1988	1,325,499	4,044,784	32.8%
2022	1,652,600	5,296,814	31.2%

Repartition of Lebanese Shia Muslims by governorates
Governorates of Lebanon	2014		2022	
Governorates of Lebanon	Pop.	%	Pop.	%
Nabatieh Governorate	346 331	35.41%	377 390	33.88%
South Governorate	240 280	24.57%	282 768	25.39%
Baalbek-Hermel Governorate	209 463	21.42%	231 702	20.8%
Beirut Governorate	73 517	7.52%	81 915	7.35%
Mount Lebanon Governorate	52 701	5.39%	58 411	5.24%
Beqaa Governorate	45 313	4.63%	53 132	4.77%
Keserwan-Jbeil Governorate	17 210	1.76%	19 617	1.76%
North Governorate	5 201	0.53%	5 288	0.47%
Akkar Governorate	3 012	0.31%	3 578	0.32%
Total Lebanese Shia population	978 043	100%	1 113 801	100%

== Genetics ==
A 2020 study published in American Journal of Human Genetics which analyzed ancient human remains from the region, found that there is substantial genetic continuity in the Levant since the Bronze Age (3300–1200 BC) interrupted by three significant admixture events during the Iron Age, Hellenistic, and Ottoman period, each contributing 3%–11% of non-local ancestry to the local population. The admixtures were tied to the Sea Peoples, South/Central Asians and Ottoman Turks respectively. Genetic studies have shown that there are no significant genetic differences between Lebanese Muslims and non-Muslims.

Genetic studies on Lebanese people have shown that the most common Y-DNA Haplogroups among Lebanese Shiites were J2 (26.5%), J1 (23%) and E1b1b (18%). Although haplogroup J1 is most frequent in Arabian peninsula, studies have shown that it has been present in the Levant since the Bronze Age and only expanded later into Arabia. Other haplogroups present among Lebanese Shia include G-M201, R1b, and T-L206 occurring at smaller but significant rates.

== Notable Lebanese Shia Muslims ==
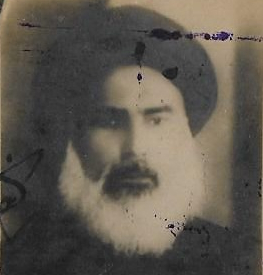
Abdul-Husayn Sharafeddine

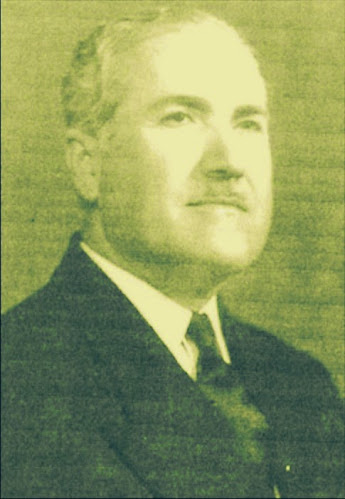
Adel Osseiran

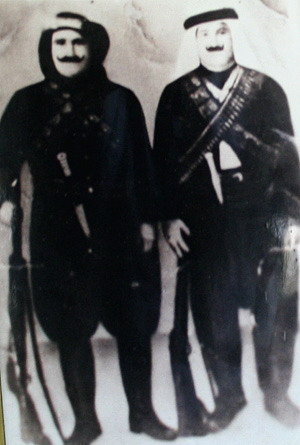
Adham Khanjar

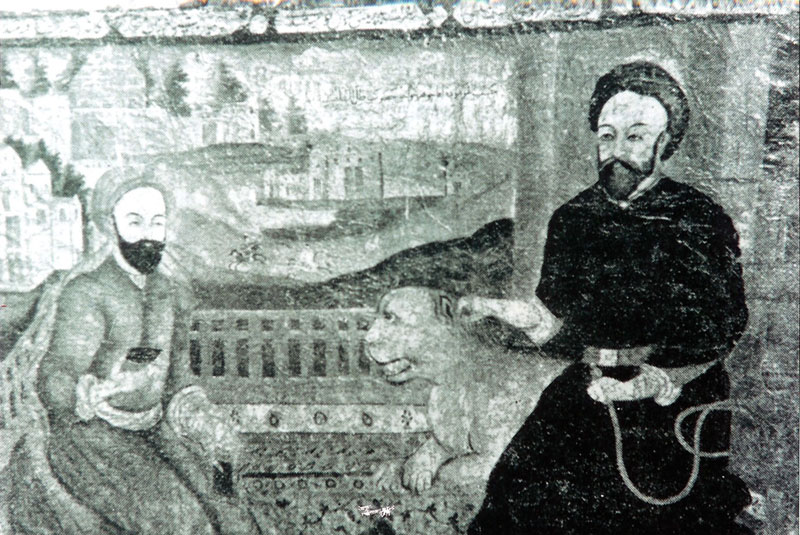
Baha al-Din al-Amili

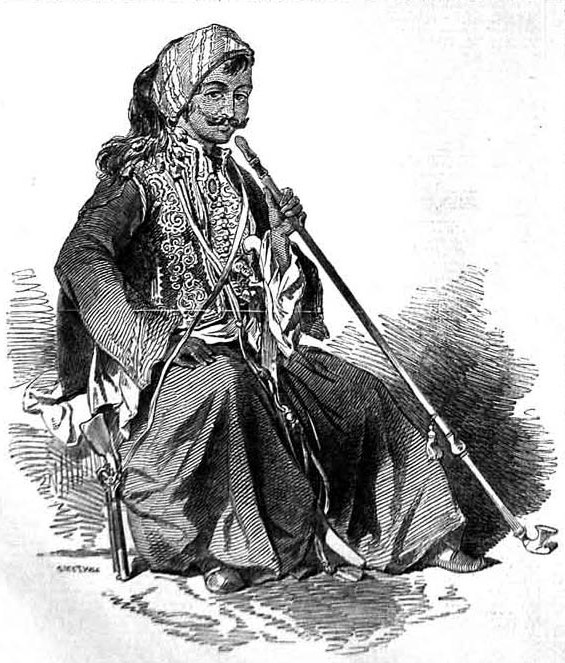
Emir Khanjar Harfush

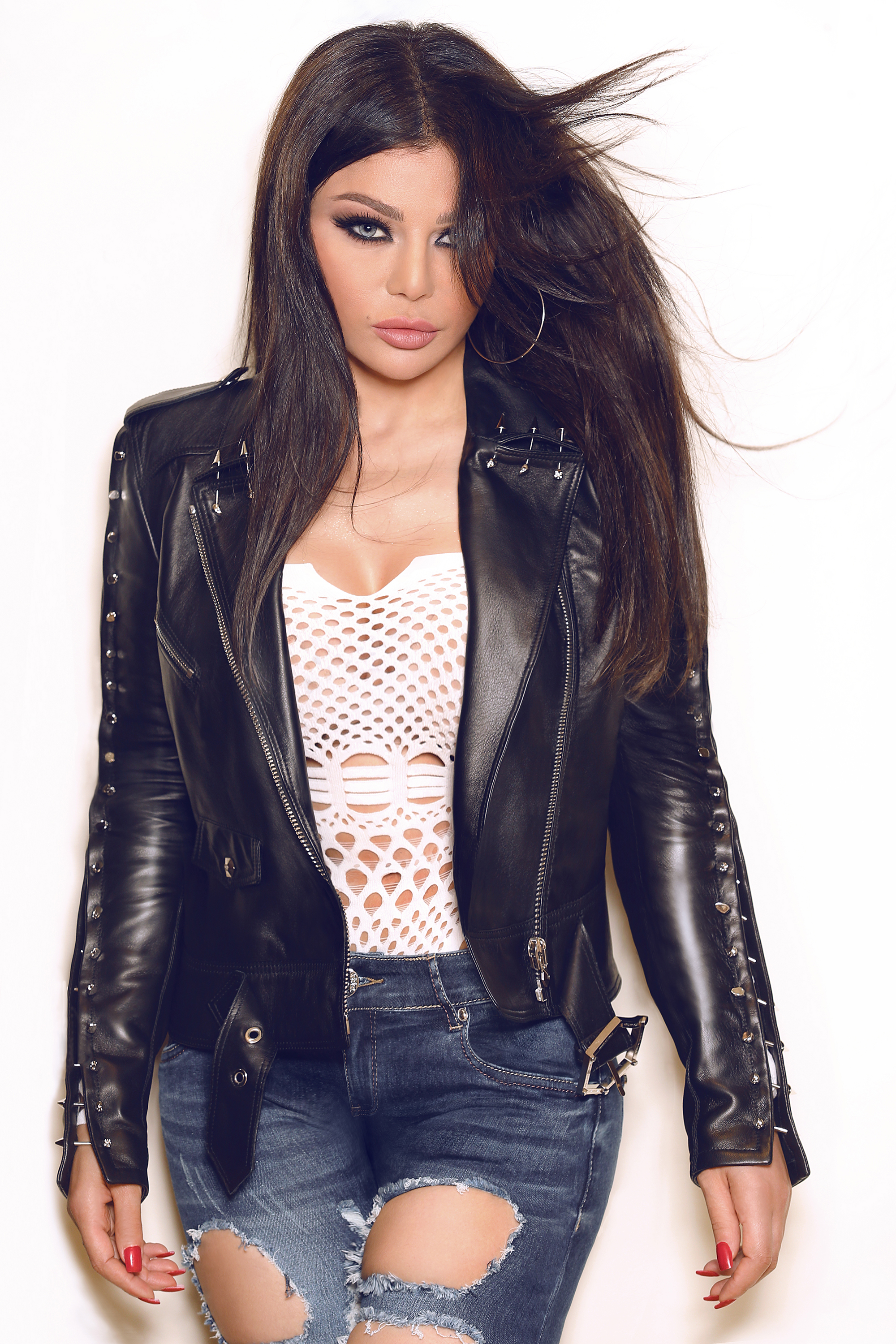
Haifa Wehbe

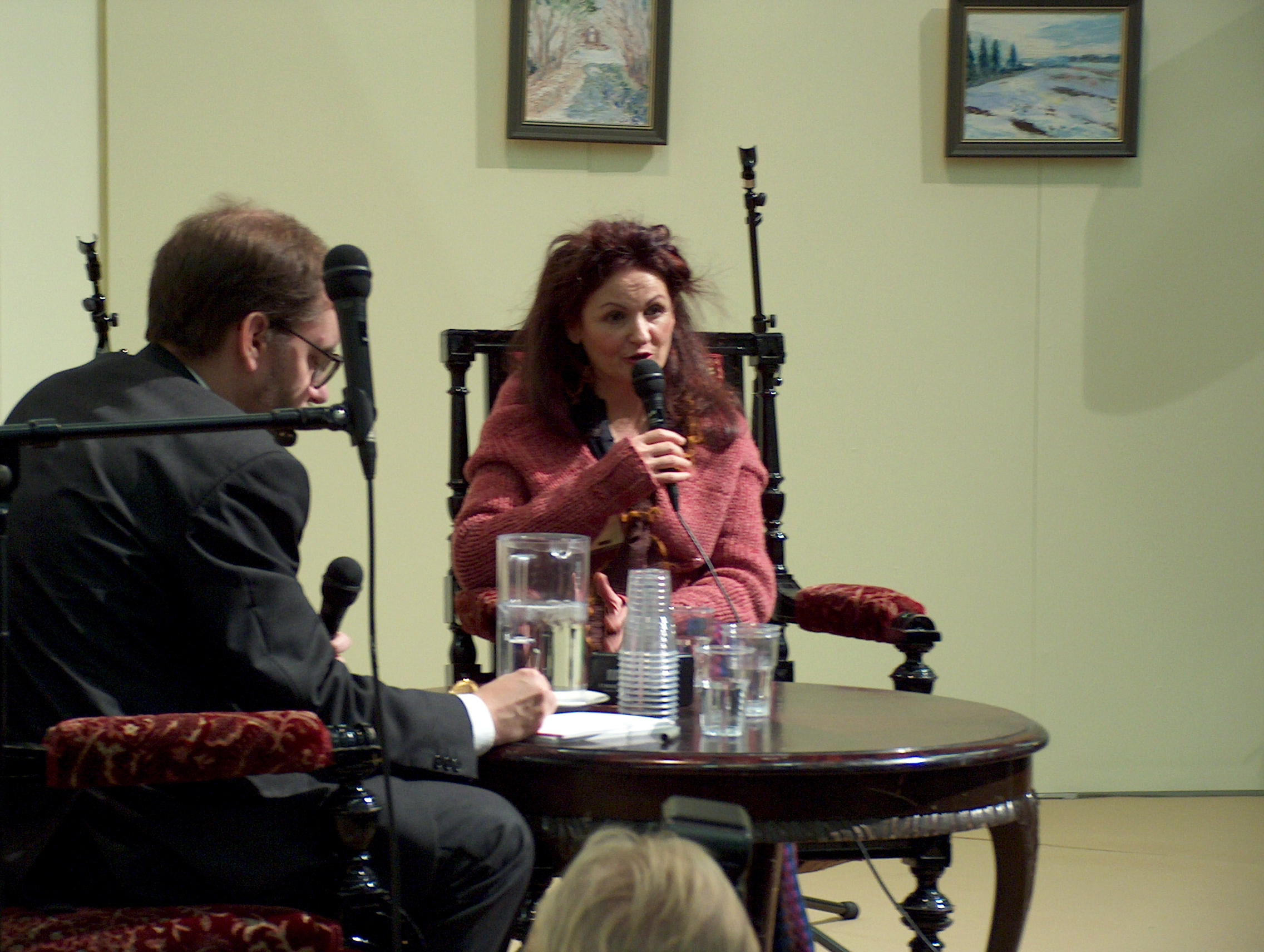
Hanan al-Shaykh

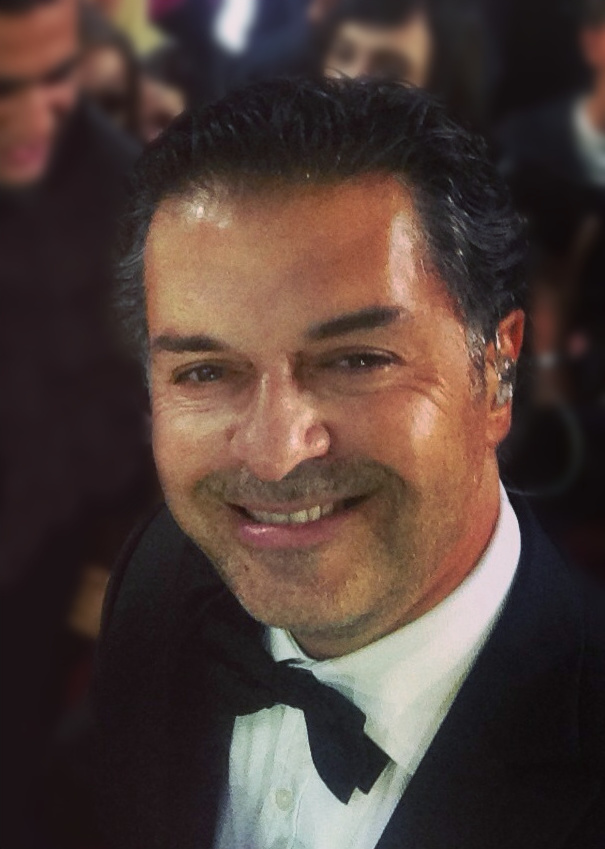
Ragheb Alama

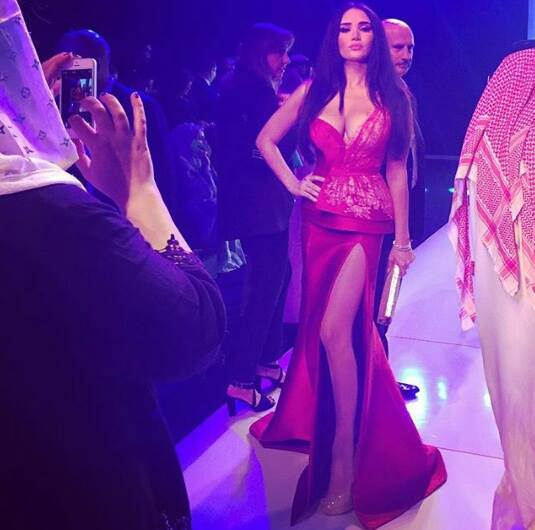
Melissa

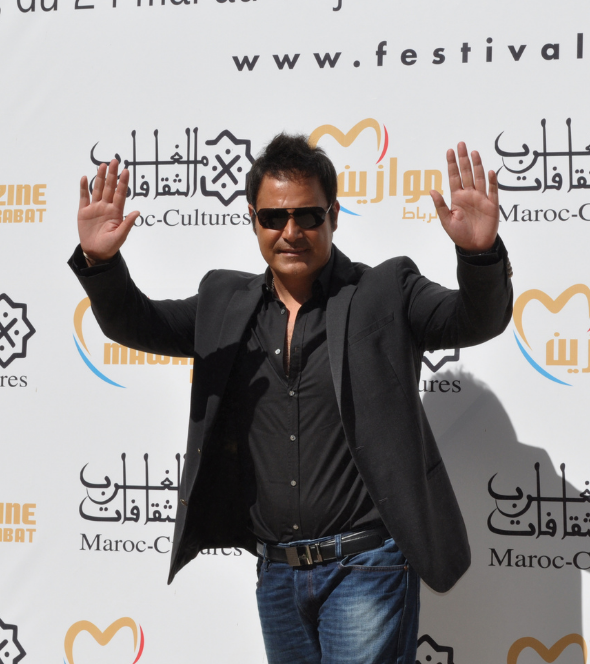
Assi El Helani

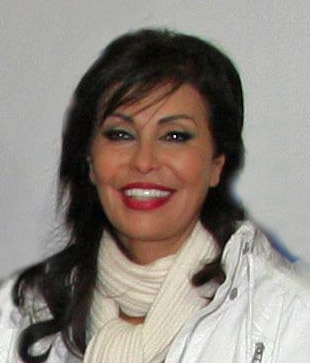
May El-Khalil

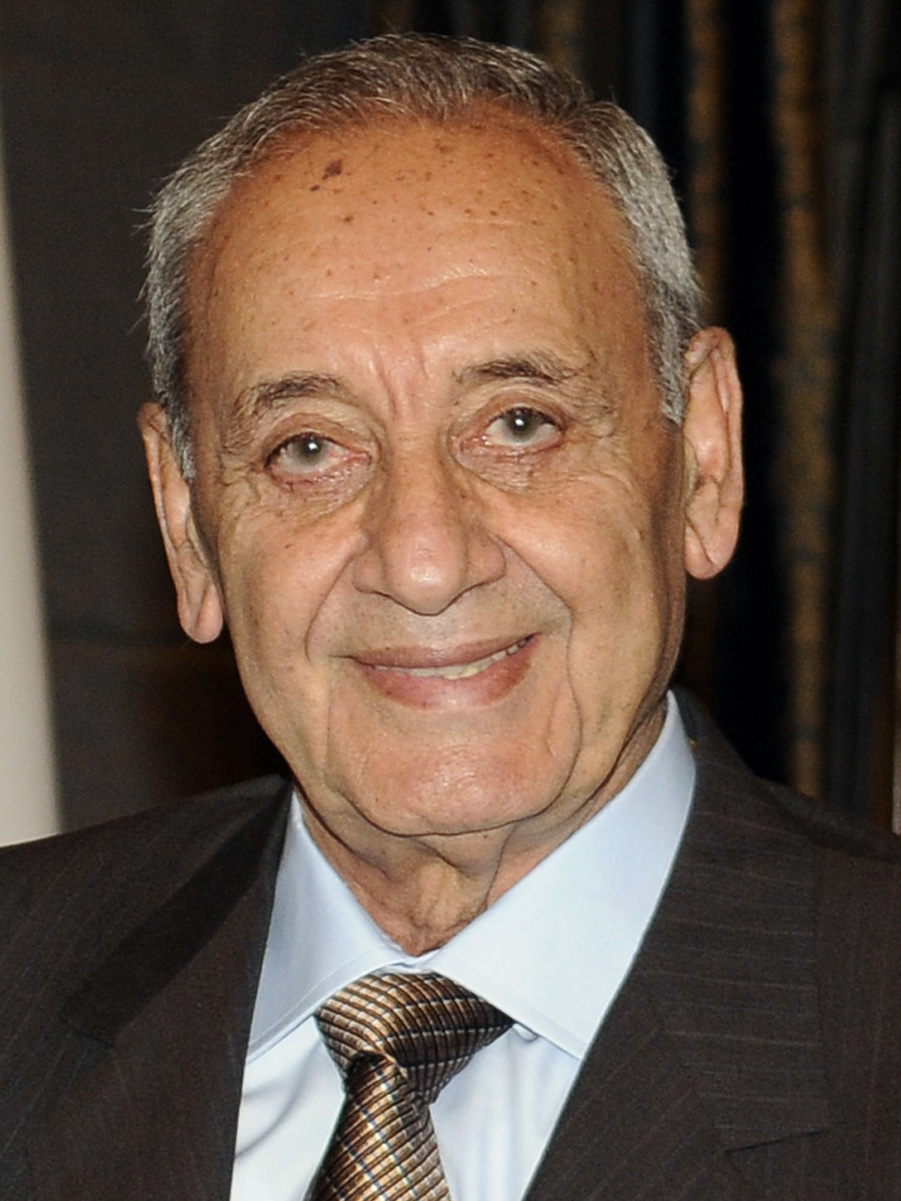
Nabih Berri

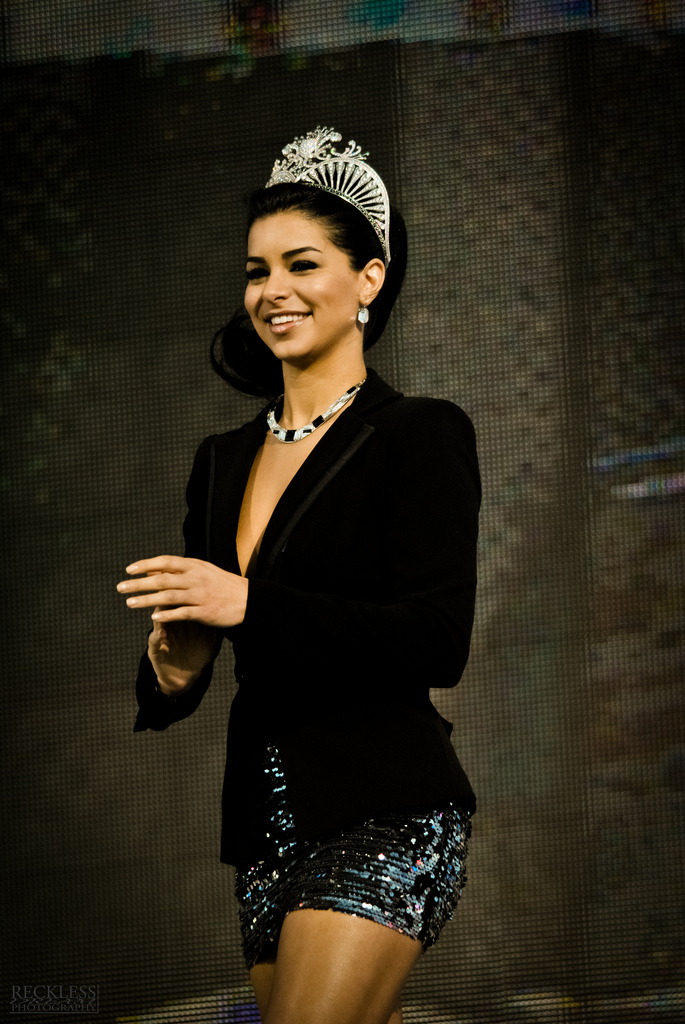
Rima Fakih

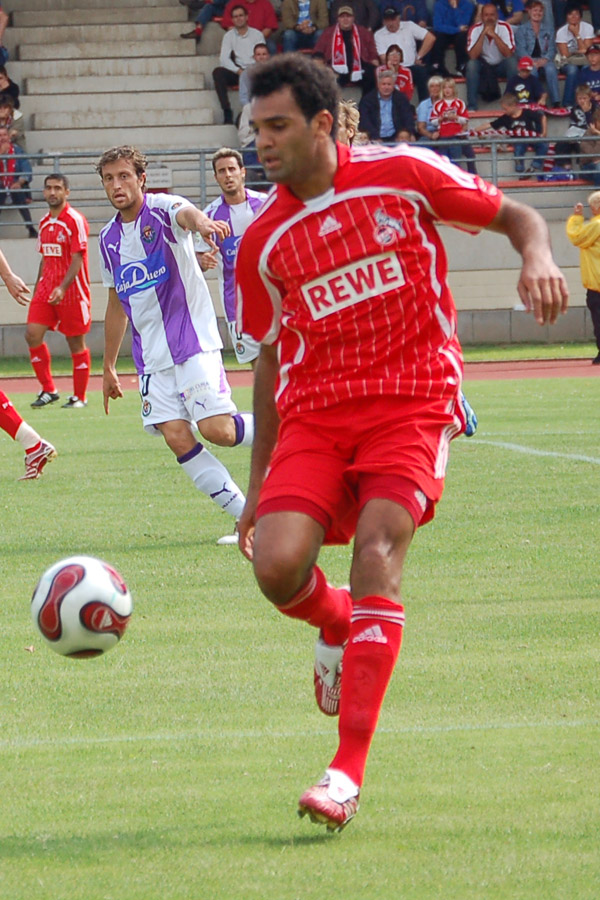
Roda Antar

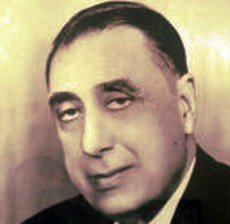
Sabri Hamadeh

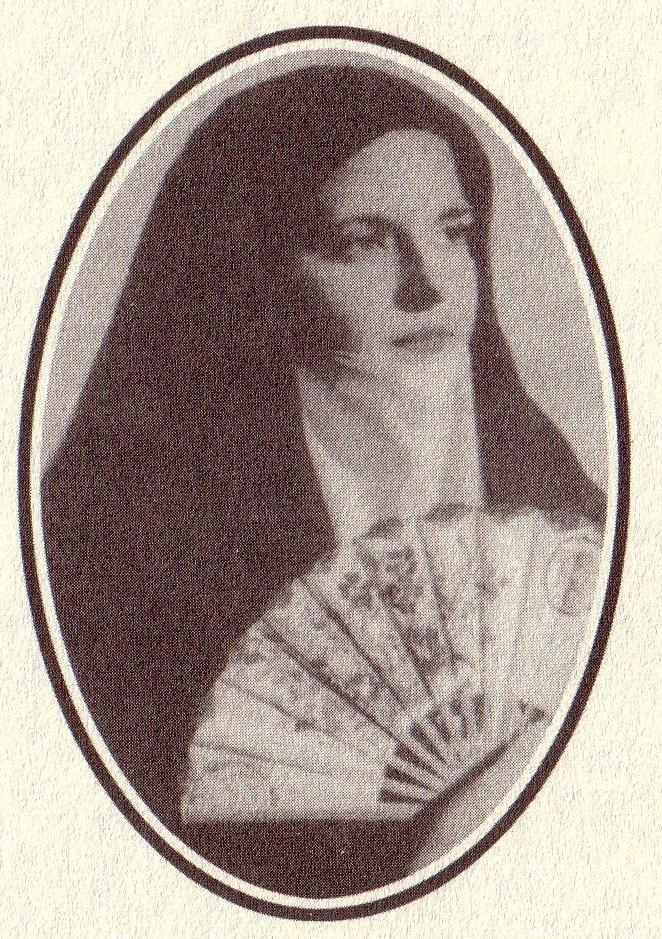
Zaynab Fawwaz

=== Academics ===
- Hassan Kamel Al-Sabbah – Electrical engineer, mathematician and inventor with patents in television transmission
- Zaynab Fawwaz – Pioneering feminist, novelist, playwright, poet and historian of famous women
- Rammal Rammal – Condensed matter Physicist at CNRS
- Ali Chamseddine – Physicist
- Hanan al-Shaykh – Author and novelist
- Amal Saad-Ghorayeb – Political writer and analyst
- Muhammad Jaber Al Safa – Historian, writer, and Arab nationalist
- Fouad Ajami – Former university professor at Stanford University

=== Culture: Artists, entertainment, journalism, sports ===
- Alissar Caracalla – Lebanese choreographer
- Amal Hijazi – Singer and former actress
- Assi El Hallani – Famous singer
- Haifa Wehbe – Singer and actress, considered one of the best-known artists in the Arab world
- Layal Abboud – Pop singer, dancer and fit model
- Mouhamed Harfouch – Brazilian-Lebanese actor
- May El-Khalil - founder of the Beirut Marathon
- May Hariri – Model, actress, and singer
- Melissa – singer
- Mira Shaib – filmmaker
- Ragheb Alama – Singer, composer, television personality, and philanthropist
- Rima Fakih – Model and winner of the 2010 Miss USA
- Rima Karaki – Television show host

=== Political figures ===
- Nassif al-Nassar (c. 1750–1781) – Sheikh of Jabal Amel
- Adham Khanjar – Lebanese revolutionary who attempted to assassinate Henri Gouraud in 1923
- Tawfiq Hawlo Haidar – Lebanese revolutionary who took part in the Great Syrian Revolt (1925–1927)
- Adel Osseiran – Speaker of the Lebanese Parliament, and one of the founding fathers of the Lebanese Republic
- Imad Mughniyeh – Hezbollah's former Chief of Staff
- Mustafa Badreddine – Former military leader in Hezbollah and both the cousin and brother-in-law of Imad Mughniyah
- Hussein el-Husseini – Statesman, co-founder of the Amal Movement and Speaker of Parliament
- Sabri Hamadeh – Former Speaker of the Parliament and political leader
- Kamel Asaad – Former Speaker of the parliament and political leader
- Nabih Berri – Speaker of the Parliament and political leader of Amal Movement
- Abbas Ibrahim – Former General director of the General Directorate of General Security
- Jamil Al Sayyed – Former General director of the General Directorate of General Security
- Hussein al-Musawi – Founder of Islamic Amal militia in 1982
- Assem Qanso – Former leader of the Arab Socialist Ba'ath Party – Lebanon Region
- Ali Qanso – Member of cabinet, former president of the Syrian Social Nationalist Party
- Husayn Muruwwa – Marxist philosopher and former key member of the Lebanese Communist Party
- Mahdi Amel – Marxist philosopher and prominent member of the Lebanese Communist party
- Mohsen Ibrahim – Founder and leader of the Communist Action Organization in Lebanon

=== Religious figures ===
- Muhammad ibn Makki (1334–1385) – Prominent Shia scholar from Jezzine known as "Shahid Awwal"/"First Martyr"
- Nur-al-Din al-Karaki al-ʿĀmilī (1465–1534) – Shiite scholar and a member of the Safavid court
- Baha al-Din al-Amili (1547–1621) – Shia Islamic scholar, philosopher, architect, and polymath
- al-Hurr al-Amili (1624–1693) – prominent Shia muhaddith and compiler of Wasa'il al-Shia
- Zayn al-Din al-Juba'i al'Amili – prominent Shia scholar during the 16th century
- Abdel Hussein Charafeddine – Spiritual leader, social reformer and leader of nonviolent resistance against the French
- Musa al-Sadr – Spiritual leader and founder of the Amal movement, philosopher and Shi'a religious leader
- Abbas al-Musawi – Shiite scholar and former leader of Hezbollah
- Hassan Nasrallah – Shiite scholar and former leader of Hezbollah
- Ragheb Harb – Shiite scholar and leader of resistance in South Lebanon
- Mohammad Hussein Fadlallah – Spiritual Leader and Shia Grand Ayatollah, former spiritual guide of Islamic Dawa Party in Lebanon
- Ahmad Rida – Shiite scholar and linguist, compiled the first monolingual Arabic dictionary, Matn al-Lugha
- Ahmed Aref El-Zein – Reformist scholar, Arab nationalist and founder of Al-Irfan magazine in 1909
- Sadr al-Din bin Saleh – Shiite scholar and patriarch of the influential Sadr family

== See also ==
- Religion in Lebanon
- Islam in Lebanon
- Lebanese Sunni Muslims
- Lebanese Druze
- Banu Amila, Shia tribe in Lebanon
- Jabal Amil, region in Lebanon
- Lebanese Maronite Christians
- Lebanese Melkite Christians
- Lebanese Greek Orthodox Christians
- Lebanese Protestant Christians
