= Ahmad Rida =

Lebanese writer and politician (1872–1953)

- الشيخ أحمد رضا
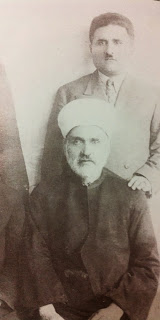
- Born: 1872; Nabatiye, Ottoman Syria
- Died: 1953 (aged 80–81); Nabatiye, Lebanon
- Occupations: Linguist, writer, politician, poet
- Writing career
- Genres: Linguistics, poetry, political theory
- Notable works: Matn al-Lugha ("Lexicon of the Arabic Language"); Radd al-ʻammiyya ila al-fusḥa ("Tracing the Colloquial to the Classical"); A series of other published works, as well as major essays and articles published in Al-Irfan, including "What is a Nation?" (1910) and "Mitwalis and Shi'is in Jabal `Amil" (1911)
- Literary movement: Nahda

Sheikh Ahmad Rida (also transliterated as Ahmad Reda) (1872–1953) (Arabic: الشيخ أحمد رضا) was a Lebanese linguist, writer and politician. A key figure of the Arab Renaissance (known as al-Nahda), he compiled the modern monolingual Arabic dictionary, Matn al-Lugha, commissioned by the Arab Academy of Damascus in 1930, and is widely considered to be among the foremost scholars of Arab literature and linguistics.

Rida was also heavily involved in Arab nationalist politics and has been variously described as "one of the leading reformers in Syria" and among the "key players in the turn-of-the-century stirrings of Arabism, local patriotism, and even defenses of Shi'i particularism".

He argued for pan-Arab unity, and was among the first scholars in Jabal Amel to seek to integrate his Shi'ite co-religionists into the greater Arab and Muslim nations while retaining their identity as a religious community.

== Political activism and social reform ==
Born in Nabatiyeh, he was a main supporter of King Faisal's Greater Syrian rule, following the Arab Revolt in the First World War. With Ahmad Aref al-Zain, he represented Jabal Amel and Lebanon's Shi'ites in most of the conferences which, at first, led to the creation of the short-lived Syrian Arab Kingdom ruled by Faisal and later, in 1936, were held to underscore Syrian unity.

He was one of the three reformers, alongside historian Mohammad Jaber Al Safa (also his son-in-law) and sheikh Suleiman Daher, to have started a scientific and social renaissance movement in Jabal Amel. The three had formed a prominent intellectual gathering, known as "the Ameli Three" (or "Amili Trio"), helping establish foundations and associations aiming at eradicating illiteracy in the region. This movement was part of what is known as Al-Nahda, of which Rida and his companions were considered to be among the pioneers in the Levant region.

The Trio played a principal role in forming Jabal Amel's political and cultural history, being the first Shi'i intellectuals to speak of an Arab nation and of an Arab state, and to formulate the arguments of the "Arabism" of the Shi'is. Rida and his companions spent two months in Aley's military prison, because of the group's violent stands against the Ottoman rule.

== Legacy ==
Sheikh Ahmad Rida wrote the important dictionary "Matn al-Lugha". As a writer, a poet and a linguist, he was a member of the Arab Academy of Damascus, and was considered to be one of the greatest intellectuals to have emerged from Greater Syria, in the twentieth century. He was described by Egyptian writer Ahmad Amin as the "greatest writer in the Levant, and the greatest linguist in the Arab world". He was the uncle of prominent scientist Hassan Kamel Al-Sabbah, father-in-law of Muhammad Jaber Al Safa and great-grandfather of General Hisham Jaber. Moreover, he worked with Ahmad Arif az-Zain and Sulaiman Zahir on the magazine al-Irfan.

== See also ==
- Al-Nahda
- Muhammad Jaber Al Safa
