= Karak Nuh =

Karak كرك كرك نوح
- Location within Lebanon
- Coordinates: 33°51′0″N 35°55′35″E
- Country: Lebanon
- Governorate: Beqaa
- District: Zahlé
- Time zone: GMT +2
  - Summer (DST): +3
- Area code: (+961) 8

Karak (also Kerak, Karak Nuh or Karak Noah) (Arabic: كرك, romanized: Karak) is a village in the municipality of Zahlé in the Zahle District of the Beqaa Governorate in eastern Lebanon. It is located on the Baalbek road close to Zahle. Karak contains a sarcophagus claimed by the locals to be the tomb of Noah. The inhabitants of Karak are Melkites, Maronites and Shia Muslims.

== History ==
The town was an important religious site during the Middle Ages, drawing devotion from the local rural village communities. During the medieval period, Karak Nuh, the shrine of biblical Noah, was identified with Shiites and had become a centre of Shiite learning. Shia muhaddith Ahmad ibn Tariq ibn Sinan was born in the town in 1132. The town was known as al-Karak during the time of the Ayyubid dynasty and changed to Karak Nuh under the Mamluks.

Under the Mamluks, Karak Nuh became the administrative center of the southern Bekaa valley (al-Biqa' al-Azizi). The earliest known waqf endowment for the shrine was established in 1331. In 1439, the Sheikh of Karak Nuh, himself a Mamluk auxiliary commander, was attacked by a mob in Damascus and killed for being a rafidi. The vicinity of Karak Nuh was also inhabited by Tanukhid emirs from Mount Lebanon, sons of al-Muwaffaq ibn Zahr al-Tanukhi, who reportedly practiced the Shia Islam. Damascene historian Shams al-Din ibn Tulun (1475–1546), who visited the town noted that "its people were famous for their Shia faith".

A Safavid sheikh, Ali al-Karaki, and various dignitaries were born in the town. In 1533–1548, the town was the second largest in the Beqaa valley after Baalbek, comprising 590 households, all Muslims. The town was largely devastated in strife between the Yunus Harfush and Fakhreddine in 1623 and as a result was abandoned for several decades, with many of its inhabitants moving to Jabal Amel.

A major earthquake damaged the town's distinguishing minaret in 1705, which required repair by the 'Alwan family.

In 1838, Eli Smith noted el-Kerak's population being Metawileh and Catholics.

== Tomb of Noah ==
According to tradition mentioned by al-Mukaddasi and Al-Dimashqi, the tomb of Noah existed in the tenth century and can still be seen. The stone tomb measures around 104.8 feet (31.9 m) long, 8.7 feet (2.7 m) wide and 3.2 feet (0.98 m) high and is covered in a worn green cloth. It is housed in a room measuring 10.1 feet (3.1 m) by 8.1 feet (2.5 m). There is a chapel next to the cenotaph building where several inscriptions (decrees) dating to the fourteenth century were found. There is also a courtyard outside the building with a prayer niche. The size of the monument possibly derives from tales of ancient giants, but is more realistically suggested to be a section of an ancient aqueduct that has been converted to serve as a shrine.

== Archaeology ==
A Roman inscription in Latin dating to the year 84 CE was found in the basement of a house to the south west of the tomb that called for the long life of the "man with many names".

== Locale ==
Near to the town is the Ayn al-Garr spring and Massyas lake and marshes that are considered to be the source of the Litani river.

== Notable people ==
- Muhammad al-Harfushi (d. 1649), cloth-maker, Arabic grammarian and poet from Karak Nuh who was persecuted for his Shia faith in Damascus and then moved to Iran where he received an official state post
- Husayn al-Mujtahid al-Karaki, Shia scholar and maternal descendant of Muhaqqiq al-Karaki, served as Shaykh al-Islām of Qazvin and Ardabil

== See also ==
- Tomb of Noah
- Al-Nabi Shayth
- List of burial places of Abrahamic figures

== Bibliography ==
- Burton, R. F. A Plain and Literal Translation of the Arabian Nights Entertainments, Vol. 7 of 10: The Book of the Thousand Nights and a Night. Forgotten Books. ISBN 978-1-4400-4321-5.
- Ḥaddād, Jūrj Marʻī (1956). Baalbak, North & South Lebanon: Description, history and touristic guide. Printed by el-Hashimieh Press.
- Le Strange, G. (1890). Palestine Under the Moslems: A Description of Syria and the Holy Land from A.D. 650 to 1500. Committee of the Palestine Exploration Fund.
- Lipiński, E. (2000). The Aramaeans: Their Ancient History, Culture, Religion. Peeters Publishers. p. 307. ISBN 978-90-429-0859-8.
- Robinson, E.; Smith, E. (1841). Biblical Researches in Palestine, Mount Sinai and Arabia Petraea: A Journal of Travels in the year 1838. Vol. 3. Boston: Crocker & Brewster.
- Winter, S. (2010). The Shiites of Lebanon under Ottoman Rule, 1516-1788. Cambridge University Press. ISBN 978-0-521-76584-8.
