= Hisham Jaber =

Lebanese general (born 1942)

Major General Hisham Jaber
- هشام جابر
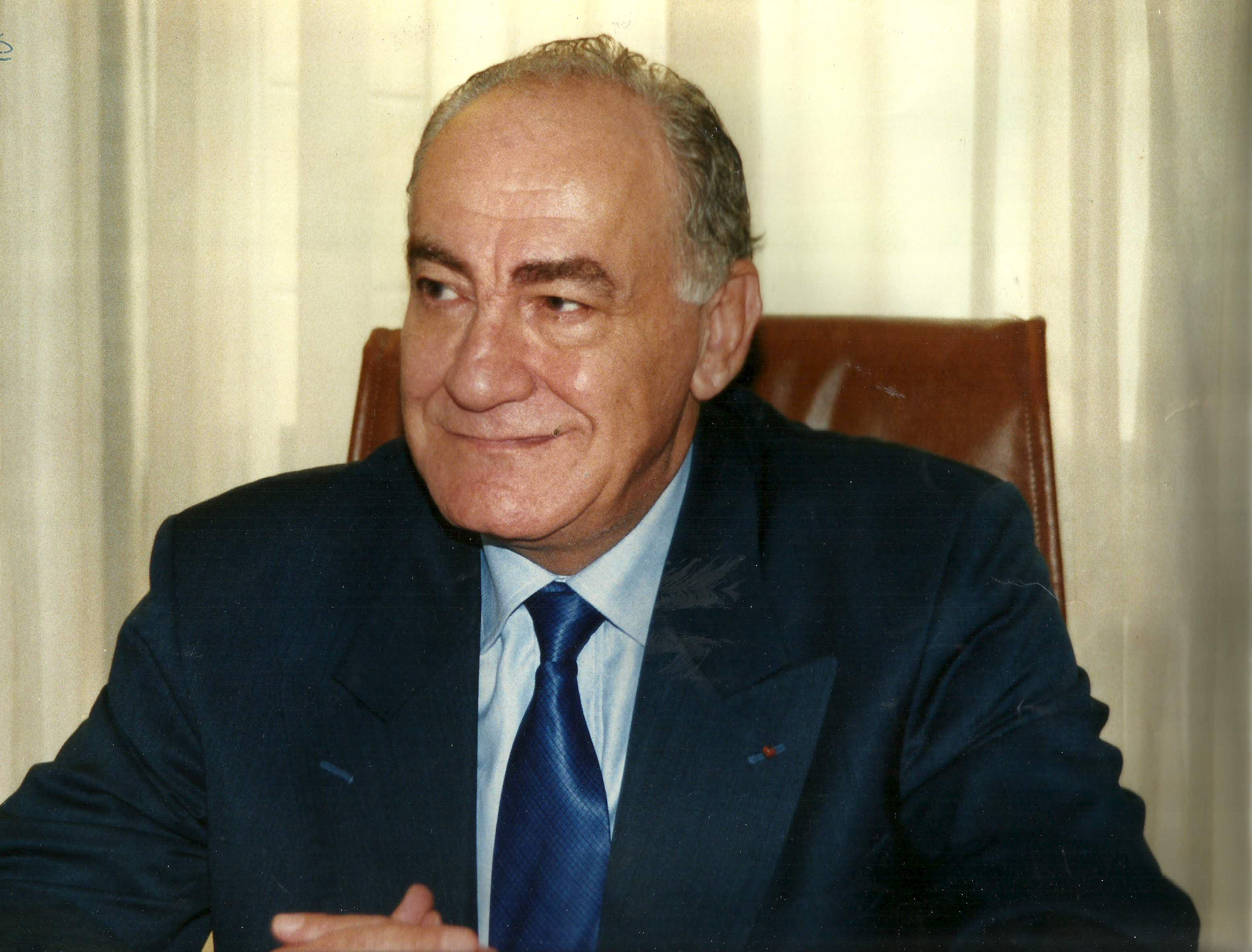

Personal details
- Born: 13 September 1942 (age 84) Nabatieh, Lebanon
- Relatives: Ahmad Rida (great-grandfather); Muhammad Jaber Al Safa (grandfather); Hussein el-Husseini (father-in-law)
- Education: Lebanese Army Military Academy (BS); Command and General Staff College (MMAS); University of Paris IV (DEA/PhD)

Military service
- Allegiance: Lebanon
- Years of service: 1961–2000
- Rank: Major General

General Hisham M. Jaber Āl Safa (born 13 September 1942; Arabic: اللواء الركن هشام جابر آل صفا) is a retired Lebanese Major General and a prominent military expert, political commentator, and researcher. He served extensively in the Lebanese Army, ultimately serving as military commander of Beirut. Post-retirement, he has emerged as a highly sought-after analyst on military and political affairs in Lebanon and the broader Middle East region.

== Early life and education ==
Jaber was born in Nabatieh, Jabal Amel, to a prominent family of notables and intellectuals descended from the Safavids.

Mahmoud-Moufid Jaber Āl Safa, his father, was a distinguished jurist and anticolonial activist. He was the son of the historian Muhammad Jaber Al Safa and the grandson of the linguist and writer, Sheikh Ahmad Rida. His mother, Julia Tayyar, a Greek Orthodox Christian, hailed from Safita and was the daughter of the notable Youssef Tayyar. Sadiq Tayyar, Julia’s brother, closely associated with Antoun Saadeh, played a pivotal role as the founding leader of the SSNP’s Safita chapter.

After graduating from the Lebanese Army Military Academy, Jaber was assigned to the French postgraduate École d'application de l'infanterie in Saint-Maixent-l'École for specialized infantry training. He subsequently undertook intensive courses in public relations and information at the Defense Information School at Fort Benjamin Harrison, Indiana, in 1976. He furthered his studies in psychological warfare at the John F. Kennedy Special Warfare Center and School in Fort Bragg, North Carolina. In 1982, Jaber earned a Master of Military Art and Science degree from the Command and General Staff College at Fort Leavenworth, Kansas, while simultaneously pursuing a master’s degree in mass communication at the University of Kansas.

Jaber then obtained a DEA (diplôme d'études approfondies) in contemporary history at the Sorbonne (Paris IV), Paris, France in 1993, and later in 1997, a PhD in modern political history also at the Sorbonne. His four-hour thesis defense was attended by several political figures, including French Foreign Minister Hervé de Charette, French deputy Gérard Bapt and Lebanese statesman Raymond Eddé.

== Military career ==
- 1982 – He was head of the Liaison Office between the American forces (as part of the Multinational Force) and the Lebanese army during the Lebanese Civil War.
- 1986 – He was Commander of the High Center for Military Sport.
- 1991 – He became Lebanon's military attaché at the Lebanese Embassy in Paris.
- 1993 – He taught terrorism, guerrilla warfare and unconventional warfare at the Command and Staff College in the Lebanese Army.
- 1996 – He was Commander of the Lebanese Army Teaching Institute.
- 1997 – In his last term in the military corps, Jaber became military governor of Beirut.
- 2000 – The general retired and founded Help&Data, a public relations, lobbying and business intelligence firm based in Beirut, for he maintains excellent relationships with heads of states in West Africa and Arab countries.

== Political career ==
Jaber advocates for Lebanon's right to resist foreign aggressions, emphasizing that such resistance must be coordinated under the state's control and strictly for defensive purposes. As such, he supports the formation of a state-controlled national guard that would absorb all Lebanese non-state armed groups.

He has expressed opposition to unauthorized military actions by non-state armed groups, notably criticizing Hezbollah's unilateral involvement in the 2023 Gaza conflict which began on October 7.

Jaber is also a critic of the ruling sectarian political class, and a leading critic of the Israeli–Lebanese maritime border deal, which was mediated by Israeli-American envoy Amos Hochstein and resulted in Lebanon relinquishing its claims to parts of the Karish gas field.

During the 2018 Lebanese general election, Jaber ran as an independent candidate facing the Hezbollah/Amal list in the South III electoral district. He headed the Al-Janūb Yastahiqq ("The South Deserves It") list, which placed second in terms of overall votes in the district.

In June 2021, following months of political deadlock over the Lebanese cabinet makeup, Jaber was suggested, as part of a French mediation effort, for the post of Foreign Minister. The proposal was described by Lebanese President Michel Aoun as "too good to be true," but was rejected by Amal's leader Nabih Berri, who bears animosity towards Jaber since the February 6 Intifada, when the latter refused to defect from the Lebanese Army to join Berri. Jaber had been nominated for the posts of Foreign Minister and Defense Minister several times before by Presidents Emile Lahoud, Michel Suleiman, and Aoun, but his nomination was vetoed each time by Berri.

Jaber is regularly hosted and cited as a military and Middle East politics expert by such outlets as the Associated Press, Reuters, the New York Times, CNN, the Washington Post, The Economist, BBC, France 24, RT, Sputnik, Al Jazeera, and others.
