= Mohammed Jaber =

Mohammed Jaber may refer to:

- Muhammad Jaber Al Safa (1875–1945), historian, writer and politician
- Mohammed Jaber (footballer) (born 1989), Emirati footballer
- Abu Shujaa (1998–2024, born Mohammed Jaber), Palestinian militant
- Mohammed Jabir Abdul Latif, one of the perpetrators of the 1993 Bombay bombings
