= Al-Irfan (magazine) =

Weekly literary and political magazine in Lebanon

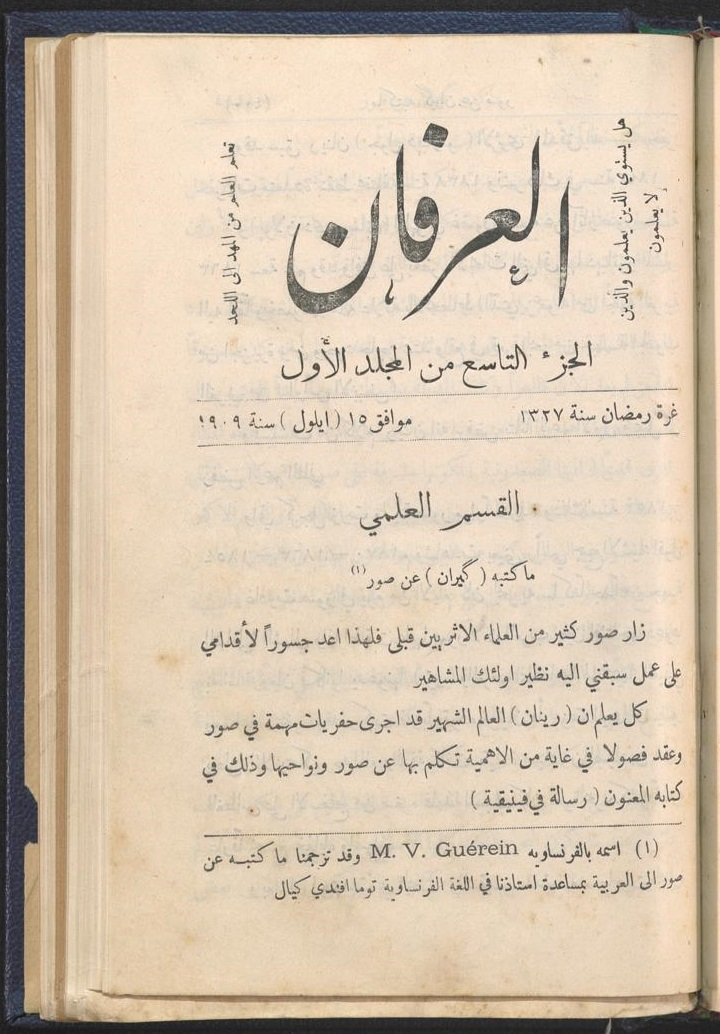
- Categories: Literature, Science, Politics
- Frequency: Weekly
- Publisher: Aḥmad ʿĀrif az-Zain
- Founded: 1909
- First issue: 5 February 1909
- Country: Lebanon
- Based in: Saida; Beirut
- Language: Arabic

The Arabic Shiite reform journal al-Irfan (Arabic: العرفان; DMG: al-ʿIrfān; "Knowledge") is a weekly periodical headquartered in Beirut, Lebanon. It has been in circulation since 1909.

== History and profile ==
Al-ʿIrfān was founded in Beirut by Aḥmad ʿĀrif az-Zain (1883-1960) in 1909. From 1910 the publication was transferred to a special printing house in Saida, South Lebanon. Az-Zain, who had worked before for different magazines, among others Thamarāt al Funūn (1875-1908), was in charge until 1960. Together with Aḥmad Riḍā (1872-1953) and Sulaimān Ẓāhir (1873-1960) he initiated a new stage of Nahda with this encyclopedic educational journal in South Lebanon.

The subtitle ("maǧalla ʿilmīya, adabīya, aḫlāqīya, iǧtimāʿīya") explains clearly that al-ʿIrfān was a journal for science, literature, morals and social issues. Moreover, in the preface of the first edition it was formulated that no political or religious articles should be published. Its stated objectives were to create a suitable educational institution for a broader audience that should guarantee the well-being of the public and serve the progress. As South Lebanon was not included in this process yet, the editor wanted to take this initiative by founding al-ʿIrfān.

From 1910/1911 the range of content was extended. Articles on technical progress and new inventions, on Shiite history as well as on women's topics such as upbringing and emancipation were now included. Numerous illustrations should give the journal a modern look and maybe to address those who could not read. In 1913 Al-ʿIrfān published the statistical data on the Japanese educational system to emphasize the importance of education in Japan. From 1922/1923 on an additional page with jokes and anecdotes was published to address a wider audience. Topics such as rights, freedom and democracy were gradually taken up.

Al-ʿIrfān wanted to be, in contrast to other model-journals like Al Muqtataf and Al Hilal, a mouthpiece for the religious groups of Arab Shiites. This was explicitly shown, i. e. in the cover of the 5th year, with the addition šuʿūn aš-šīʿa (Arabic: concerns of the Shia). 90% of the subscribers were Shiites from Lebanon, Iraq, Bahrain, Kuwait and other countries. Az-Zain considered himself a reformer, who understands the Islamic world as a cultural and not only as a religious unit. One of the contributors was Husayn Muruwwa, a Lebanese communist intellectual and journalist.

Objectives and content of the journal changed over time. Instead of spreading progress and enlightenment, other current and political topics became predominant.

After the independence of Lebanon in 1943 the thematic focus was more and more on the rights of Shiites in Lebanon. Az-Zain's son Nizar took over the management of the journal after his father's death in 1960, which now published mainly literature topics. After Nizar's death in 1981 the publication was handed over to his nephew Fuʿād az-Zain.

Although Al-ʿIrfān supported Musa Al Sadr, a powerful Shiite leader, it did not endorse the use of the title Imam by him arguing that this title could only be used for the twelve Imams. Iranian historian Ahmad Kasravi reported that Al-ʿIrfān was his source of having information about Europe.
