= Tomb of Noah =

Biblical place

In all there are at least five locations in different countries that are claimed to be the Tomb of Noah.

Photo	Notes
	Tomb of Noah, Nakhchivan, exclave of Azerbaijan west of Armenia and east of Turkey.
	Imam Ali Mosque, Najaf, Iraq
	Al-Karak, Jordan
	Karak Nuh, Lebanon
	Maqam Nabi Noah, Dura, Hebron, Palestine
	Tomb of Noah located inside the courtyard of Nebi Nuh Mosque, Cizre, Turkey

== See also ==
- List of burial places of Abrahamic figures
- Karaca Dağ near Diyarbakır
- Noah in Islam
