= Muhammad Jaber Al Safa =

Lebanese politician (1875–1945)

Muhammad Jaber Āl Safa
- Born: 1875; Nabatiye, Ottoman Syria
- Died: 1945 (aged 69–70); Nabatiye, Lebanon
- Occupations: Historian, writer, poet, politician
- Relatives: Ahmad Rida (father-in-law); Hisham Jaber (grandson)
- Writing career
- Notable work: Tārīkh Jabal ʻAmil (The History of Jabal Amil)

Muhammad Jaber Āl Safa (also spelled Jabir Al Safa) (1875–1945) (Arabic: محمد جابر آل صفا) was a historian, writer and politician from Jabal Amel (in modern-day Lebanon), known for his founding role in the anti-colonialist Arab nationalist movement in the turn-of-the-century Levant.

== Biography ==
Jaber Āl Safa was born in Nabatiye into an illustrious family of scholars descended from the Safavids. His ancestor, Ismail Mirza, a son of Hamza Mirza - the eldest son and designated heir of Shah Mohammad Khodabanda - had travelled from Isfahan to Nabatiye to escape persecution by his uncle Shah Abbas I.

Jaber Āl Safa studied language and history under renowned scholars Hassan Yusuf al-Makki and Muhammad Ibrahim al-Husseini. Jaber Al Safa and his companions Sheikh Ahmad Reda (also his father-in-law) and Sheikh Sulaiman Daher, having formed an intellectual gathering known as "the Ameli Three", also known as the "Amili Trio" or "Nabatieh Trio", played a principal role in forming Jabal Amel's political and cultural history, and were also the first in that region to speak of an Arab nation and of an Arab state.

Because of the group's strong opposition to the Ottoman rule, they were arrested in 1915, along with other Arab nationalist leaders such as Rida Al Solh and his son Riad, and imprisoned in Aley's military prison. They were liberated as the Ottomans left the country during the First World War.

He was a major supporter of King Faisal's rule in the region of Syria following the Arab Revolt, having been a leading nationalist since before the outbreak of the First World War. Nationalists, prior to the revolt, were not secessionists. Rather, they called for decentralization and discussed nationalist ideas, while still positioning themselves within the Ottoman entity. Jaber Al Safa credited the Ottoman state with losing people's support because of the harsh measures it implemented regarding conscription and, before that, its suppression of Arabic as an official and administrative language and related Turkification policies brought forth by the Committee of Union and Progress.

Jaber, as part of the "Amili Trio", lobbied for Lebanon's union with Syria and opposed the French Mandate in Lebanon (he was briefly arrested by the French authorities but was released following widespread protests in Nabatiye in his support), remaining a supporter of pan-Arab unity until his death in 1945.

He wrote "Tārīkh Jabal `Amil", or "The History of Jabal `Amil", which is used as a main reference on the history of the Levant and Lebanon, and Jabal Amel in particular.

== Ancestry ==
Patriline
1. 1st Imam Ali ibn Abu Talib, 601–661
2. 3nd Imam Husayn ibn Ali, 626–680
3. 4rd Imam Ali ibn Husayn Zayn al-Abidin, 659–713
4. 5th Imam Muhammad al-Baqir, 677–733
5. 6th Imam Jafar al-Sadiq, ca. 702–765
6. 7th Imam Musa ibn Jafar, ca. 745-ca. 799
7. Abul-Qasim Hamza ibn Musa
8. Qasim ibn Hamza
9. Ahmad ibn Qasim
10. Muhammad ibn Ahmad
11. Ismail ibn Muhammad
12. Muhammad ibn Ismail
13. Jaafar ibn Muhammad
14. Ibrahim ibn Jaafar
15. Muhammad ibn Ibrahim
16. Hasan ibn Muhammad
17. Muhammad ibn Hasan
18. Sharaf-Shah ibn Muhammad
19. Muhammad ibn Sharaf-Shah
20. Firuz-Shah Zarrin-Kolah
21. Awadh ibn Firuz-Shah
22. Muhammad al-Hafiz ibn Awadh
23. Salih ibn Muhammad al-Hafiz
24. Qutb al-Din ibn Salih
25. Sheikh Amin al-Din Jibril ibn Qutbuddin
26. Sheikh Safi al-Din Ishaq
27. Sheikh Sadr al-Din Musa
28. Sheikh Khoja Ala al-Din Ali
29. Sheikh Ibrahim Shah
30. Sheikh Junayd
31. Sheikh Haydar
32. Shah Ismail
33. Shah Tahmasp
34. Shah Mohammad Khodabanda
35. Hamza Mirza
36. Ismail Mirza
37. Hijazi ibn Ismail
38. Muhammad ibn Hijazi
39. Jaber ibn Muhammad
40. Muhammad ibn Jaber
41. Taleb ibn Muhammad
42. Muhammad ibn Taleb Jaber Al Safa

== See also ==
- List of historians
