= Matn al-Lugha =

Arabic dictionary

Matn al-Lugha (Arabic: متن اللُّغة; "Corpus of the Language") was one of earliest modern monolingual dictionaries of the Arabic language, written by Lebanese linguist Sheikh Ahmed Rida, an important figure of the Arab literary renaissance. The five-volume dictionary is considered as one of the most influential resources in the history of the Arabic language lexicography.
