= Hassan Kamel Al-Sabbah =

Lebanese engineer, mathematician and inventor

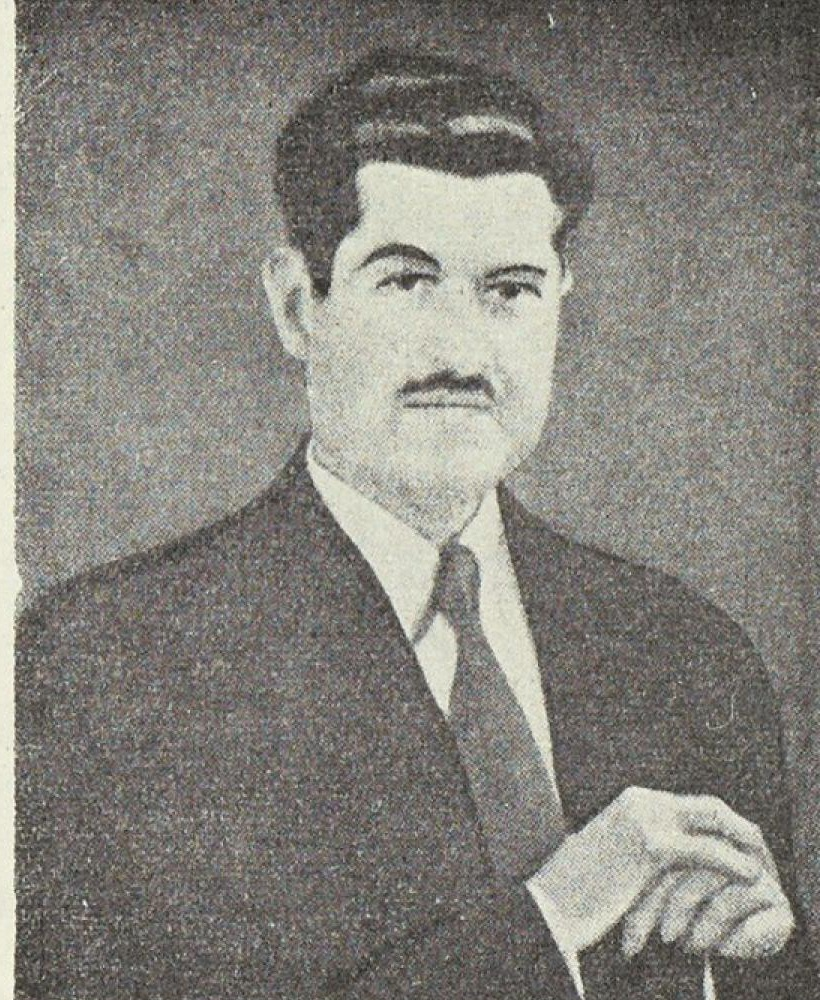
- Portrait of Al-Sabbah
- Born: August 1894; Nabatieh, Lebanon
- Died: 31 March 1935 (aged 40); Lewis, United States
- Occupations: electrical and electronics research engineer, mathematician and inventor.

Hassan Kamel Al-Sabbah (Arabic: حسن كامل الصباح; August 16, 1894 – March 31, 1935) was a Lebanese electrical and electronics research engineer, mathematician and inventor. He was born in Nabatieh in present-day Lebanon. (citation needed)

== Biography ==
He studied at the American University of Beirut. In 1916, he was conscripted into the Ottoman army, and worked as a telegraph operator. He later taught mathematics in Damascus, Syria, and at the American University of Beirut.

In 1921, he travelled to the United States and for a short time studied at the Massachusetts Institute of Technology before joining the University of Illinois in 1923. He joined the vacuum tube department of the Engineering Laboratory of the General Electric Company at Schenectady, New York, in 1923, where he had engaged in mathematical and experimental research, principally on rectifiers and inverters. He received 43 patents covering his work. Among the patents were reported innovations in television transmission (no reliable sources confirm this information). (invalid citation)

He died in an automobile accident at Lewis near Elizabethtown, New York. His body was buried at the Nabatieh Cemetery in his hometown Nabatieh, Lebanon.

He was the nephew of linguist and writer Sheikh Ahmad Rida.

== Legacy ==
On 2 August 2023, to commemorate Ahly Nabatieh's first season in the Lebanese Premier League and their 55th anniversary, the club unveiled a new logo featuring Hassan Kamel Al-Sabbah.
