= Ahmed Aref El-Zein =

Muslim scholar (1881–1960)

Sheikh Ahmed Aref El-Zein شيخ أحمد عارف الزين
- Sheikh Ahmed Aref El-Zein
- Born: Ahmed Aref El-Zein (أحمد عارف الزين); 10 July 1884; Shhur شحور, Lebanon
- Died: 13 October 1960 (aged 76); Shrine of Imam Ali Al-Rida in Kharasan, Iran
- Occupations: Writer, intellectual, theologian

Sheikh Ahmed Aref El-Zein (10 July 1884 – 13 October 1960) (Arabic: شيخ أحمد عارف الزين) was a Shi'a intellectual from the Jabal Amil (جبل عامل) area of South Lebanon. He was a reformist scholar who engaged in the modernist intellectual debates that resonated across Arab and Muslim societies in the early 20th century. Disappointed by the lack of education and prosperity of his community under Ottoman rule, he collaborated with other local scholars on interaction with reform movements underway in Damascus, Baghdad and Cairo. By founding the monthly magazine Al-Irfan, he is credited with bringing literary edification and news of scientific innovations to his community and others across the Arab-speaking world. He published a weekly paper, Jabal Amil for a year, wrote several books and established the first printing press in South Lebanon. He promoted education for both sexes in his conservative society and helped female authors by publishing their material under their real names or pseudonyms. He was a pillar in the national Syrian-Arab movement against Ottoman rule in the later years of the Sultanate and resisted the French mandate by advocating independence for Lebanon. He sought educational reforms and the reconciliation of Islamic values with Western ideas of liberty and democracy.

== The early years ==
El-Zein was born in Shhur, South Lebanon on 10 July 1884 (16 Ramadan 1301 a.h.). There were no schools in his village so he was sent to a single-teacher school in a nearby village where he was taught reading, the Koran and basic writing skills. His family moved to Sidon (the third largest city in Lebanon) where he attended the Rushdiya public school for four years. At the age of 11, his father sent him to Nabatiya where he attended Al-Hamidiya religious institution and was schooled in the Arabic language. He was tutored in Turkish and Persian and later studied Islamic jurisprudence with the scholar Sayed Abd-al-Hussein Sharaf-El-Deen. He returned to Sidon in 1904 where he continued his religious education and took French and English language instruction.

He spent his professional life fighting for the rights of the under-privileged in his community and exposing Lebanon's Shi'a to the brewing reformist ideas of the era and the latest innovations in science and technology.

He married his cousin Amira Ismail El-Zein in 1904. They had three sons (Adeeb, Nizar and Zayd) and five daughters (Adeeba, Selma, Fatima, May and Azza).

== Literary contributions ==
=== Early career ===
El-Zein worked as a correspondent for several newspapers published in the Lebanese capital Beirut including Thamarat Al-Funoon, Al-Ittihad Al-Othmani, and Hadikat Al-Akhbar.

=== Al-Irfan ===
On 5 February 1909, El-Zein published the first issue of Al-Irfan, an Arabic-language monthly "Scientific, Historical, Literary and Sociological Review." This introduced the world to the Shi'a community in Lebanon and farther afield in Iraq and Iran and debated issues of concern to Shi'a and Arabs. The magazine was printed in Beirut for the first two years. In 1910 El-Zein commissioned his own printing press in Sidon where the monthly was printed until the 1960s. It was published 10 times a year until after the death of the founder's son Nizar Al-Zein in 1981. Afterwards, it was published quarterly until 1987 and then resumed between 1992 and 1996.

In his publication for the Center for Lebanese Studies at Oxford "Aspects of Shi'i Thought From the South of Lebanon," Chibli Mallat says the magazine "epitomized an era and an area," taking advantage of the 1908 Ottoman constitutional revolution and a "new atmosphere of freedom of expression started in Istanbul." He posited that the contributors to the magazine and the debates played out within its pages "reflected, and to an extent shaped, history to come," as Al-Irfan became the "point of convergence" for the Shi'a writers on politics and social affairs. Its influence can be seen in Lebanese Shi'a political and religious writings throughout the twentieth century.

=== Other publications ===
In addition to the numerous articles (literary, fiction, political and religious) and poetry that he published in his monthly journal and in a weekly paper Jabal Amil that he published from 28 December 1911 to 5 December 1912. He wrote:

- A book: Tarikh Saida (The history of Sidon) in 1913.
- A book: Mukhtasar Tarikh Al-Shi'a (A Brief History of the Shi'a) in 1914.
- A short story, Al-Hub al-Sharif (Honest Love – A Literary Ethical Love Story) in 1921.

He also edited and published:

- Al-Wasata Bayn Al-Mutanabi wa Khosomoh (The Mediation between Al-Mutanabi and his Opponents).
- Majma' Al-Bayan Fi Tafseer Al-Quran (The Confluence of Knowledge in the Interpretation of the Quran).

== Death ==
He died 13 October 1960 (22 Rabi Al-Thani 1380) while on a visit to the shrine of Imam Ali al-Rida in Khorasan, Iran. He was buried inside the shrine.
