= Stefan Winter (historian) =

Canadian historian

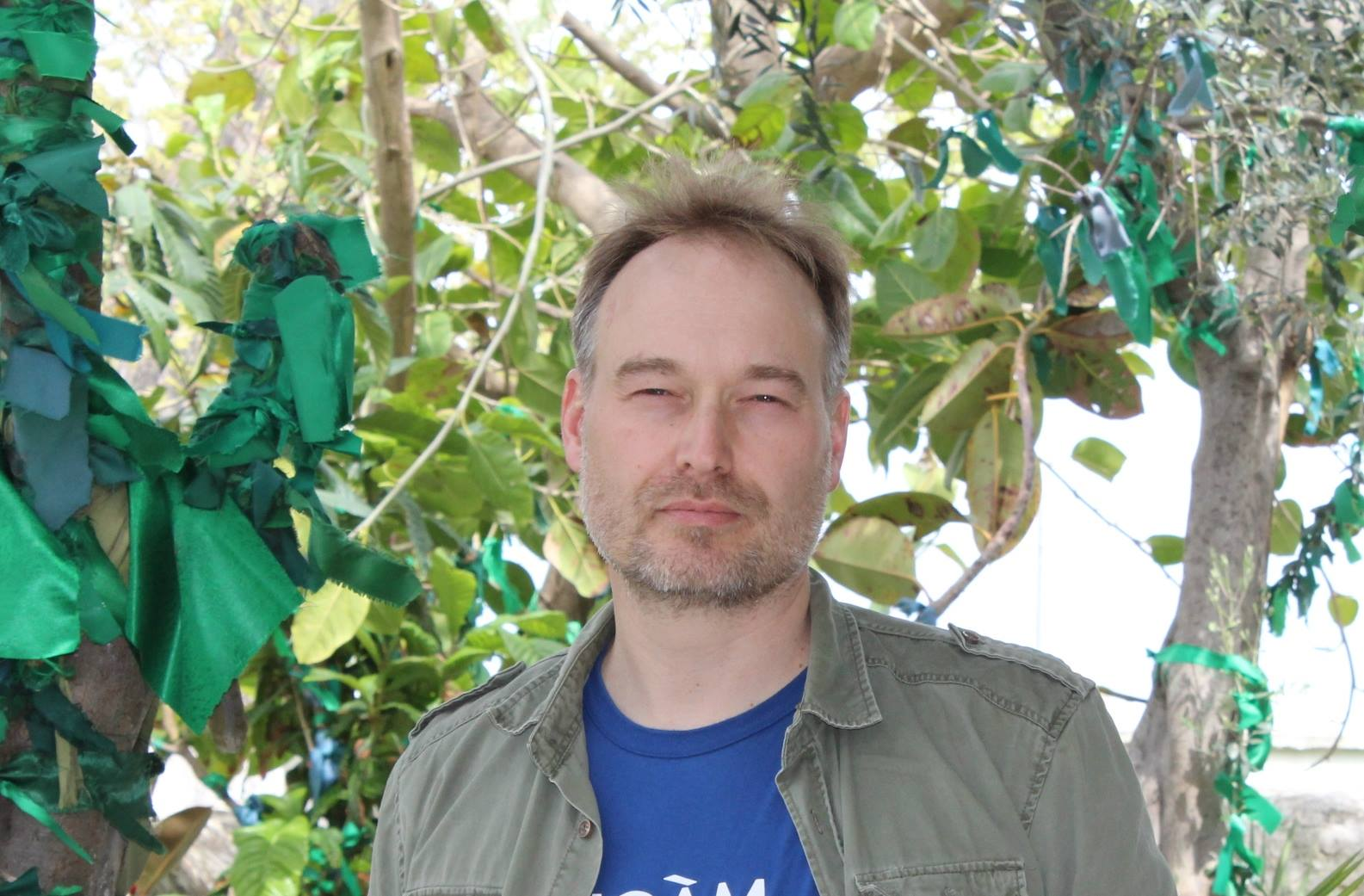
- Born: August 16, 1970 (age 56)
- Occupations: Academic and Scholar

Stefan Winter is a Canadian historian specialising in the study of Ottoman Syria. He teaches at the Université du Québec à Montréal and has been visiting professor at Koç University in Istanbul. His research concentrates on Shi‘i, Bedouin and Kurdish principalities in northern Syria and southern Anatolia and has been published by Cambridge University Press, Princeton University Press and in a number of academic journals. His work won the Syrian Studies Association's prize for best dissertation in 2002 and the Ottoman and Turkish Studies Association's Fuat Köprülü Award in 2017.

== Education ==
Born into a German-speaking family established in Québec since 1970, Stefan Winter completed his school education with a Diplôme d’études collégiales (DEC) in Commerce at CÉGEP St.-Lawrence in Sainte-Foy before studying at the University of Toronto (BA, Middle East and Islamic Studies, 1994), Universität Erlangen (MA, Political Science, 1996), the Institut français d’études arabes in Damascus, Bilkent University in Ankara, and the University of Chicago (PhD, History, 2002).

== Teaching ==
Stefan Winter has been professor of history (professeur régulier, Département d’histoire) at the Université du Québec à Montréal (UQÀM) since 2004. He also served as director of the Groupe d’études turques et ottomanes (GÉTO) from 2006 to 2018. He was invited professor (Directeur d’études invité) at the École pratique des hautes études (EPHE) in 2007 and at the École des hautes études en sciences sociales (EHESS) in Paris in 2012 and 2018. In 2014-15 he was associate researcher at the History Department of Bilkent University in Ankara and has been visiting professor of history at Koç University since 2018.

== Research ==
Stefan Winter's research revolves around Ottoman policies toward rural and tribal communities in the Syrian-Lebanese-southern Anatolian hinterland. His work has been funded by the Fonds québécois de la recherche sur la société et la culture (FQRSC), the Social Sciences and Humanities Research Council (SSHRC) of Canada and the Scientific and Technological Research Council of Turkey (TÜBİTAK).

== Main publications ==
- The Shiites of Lebanon under Ottoman Rule, 1516-1788 (Cambridge University Press, 2010) The Shiites of Lebanon under Ottoman Rule, 1516–1788
- A History of the ‘Alawis: From Medieval Syria to the Turkish Republic (Princeton University Press, 2016) A History of the ‘Alawis | Princeton University Press
- (edited with Mafalda Ade) Aleppo and its Hinterland in the Ottoman Period / Alep et sa province à l’époque ottomane (E.J. Brill, 2019) Aleppo and its Hinterland in the Ottoman Period / Alep et sa province à l’époque ottomane
- Rural Society in Western Syria in the Early Modern Period (The Isis Press, Istanbul, 2022)
- (edited with Zainab HajHasan) Syrian-Kurdish Intersections in the Ottoman Period (University of Toronto Press, 2024) University of Toronto Press - Syrian-Kurdish Intersections in the Ottoman Period

Journal articles: Stefan Winter - Academia.edu
