= Jabal Amil =

Region of southern Lebanon

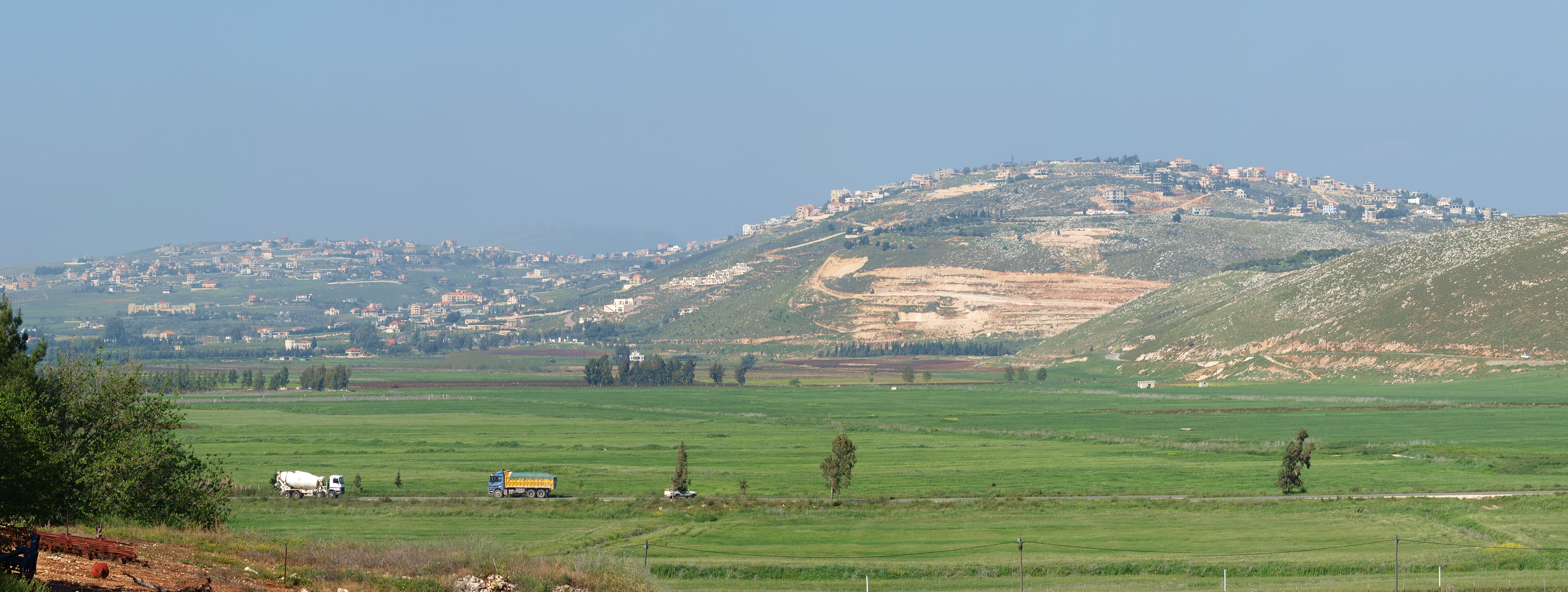
The village of Khiam, near the city of Nabatieh in the Jabal Amil region

Jabal Amil (Arabic: جبل عامل, romanized: Jabal ʿĀmil; also spelled Jabal Amel and historically known as Jabal Amila) is a cultural and geographic region in Southern Lebanon largely associated with its long-established, predominantly Twelver Shia Muslim inhabitants. Its precise boundaries vary, but it is generally defined as the mostly highland region on either side of the Litani River, between the Mediterranean Sea in the west and the Wadi al-Taym, Beqaa and Hula valleys in the east.

The Shia community in Jabal Amil is thought to be one of the oldest in history. In the 10th century, several Yemeni tribes with Shi'ite inclinations, including the 'Amila tribe, had established themselves in the region. 'Amili oral tradition and later writings assert that a companion of the Islamic prophet Muhammad and an early supporter of Ali, Abu Dharr al-Ghifari (d. AD 651), introduced Shi'ism to the area. Although there is frequent occurrence of this account in many religious sources, it is largely dismissed in academia, and historical sources suggest Shia Islam largely developed in Jabal Amil between the mid-8th and 10th centuries (750–900). Twelver Shia tradition in southern Lebanon credits the Amila, as the progenitors of the community, by having sided with the faction of Ali in the mid-7th century.

== Name ==
The region derives its name from the Amila, an Arab tribe that had been affiliated with the Ghassanid client kings of the Byzantine Empire and that moved into the region and neighboring Galilee after the 7th-century Muslim conquests. Although speculative, Twelver Shia tradition in southern Lebanon credits the Amila as the progenitors of the community, by having sided with the faction of Ali in the mid-7th century.

== Geographic definition ==
=== Early Muslim geographers' descriptions ===
The 10th-century Jerusalemite geographer al-Muqaddasi describes 'Jabal Amila' as "a mountainous district" overlooking the Mediterranean sea and connected to Mount Lebanon. It contained "many fine villages" and springs. Its fields were rain-dependent, and grapes, olives, and other fruits were grown there. It was the source of the highest-quality honey in Syria, along with that of Jerusalem. Jabal Amila, and the district of Jabal Jarash to the southeast, on the other side of the Jordan River, were the largest sources of revenue for Tiberias, the capital of Jund al-Urdunn (the Jordan [River] District). He mentions that another highland region, between Tyre, Sidon and Qadas, was known as 'Jabal Siddiqa' after a holy person's tomb in the district that was visited annually by throngs of local pilgrims and Muslim officials. Qadas is also mentioned by him as belonging to Jabal Amila.

The Damascene geographer al-Dimashqi described Jabal Amila in 1300 as a district in the Safad Province characterized by its abundant vineyards and olive, carob and terebinth groves, and populated by Twelver Shia Muslims. He also notes the neighboring highland districts of Jabal Jaba, Jabal Jazin and Jabal Tibnin whose inhabitants were also Twelver Shia and whose lands contained considerable springs, vineyards, and fruit groves. The ruler of Hama and scholar Abu'l-Fida (d. 1341) noted that Jabal Amila "runs down the coast as far south as Tyre and was home to the Shaqif Arnun fortress (Beaufort Castle).

=== Modern definition ===
According to the historian Tamara Chalabi, defining Jabal Amil is "difficult" as the region was not generally recognized as a distinct geographic or political entity. Rather, its identity, and by extension its definition, is derived from its largely Twelver Shia Muslim inhabitants, who historically referred to themselves as 'Amilis'. The scholar Marilyn Booth calls it "a terrain of identity, its 'boundaries' somewhat indefinite". In the definition generally accepted by its Twelver Shia community, the Jabal Amil is roughly 3,000 square kilometres (1,200 mi^{2}) and bound by the Awali River north of Sidon, which separates it from the Chouf highlands of Mount Lebanon, and the Wadi al-Qarn in Upper Galillee to the south. In this definition, the region is bound in the west by the Mediterranean Sea and in the east by the valley regions of Wadi al-Taym, the Beqaa, and the Hula. The Litani River cuts the region into northern and southern parts. The southern part is additionally known as Bilad Bishara.

According to the scholar Chibli Mallat, while the traditional definition of Jabal Amil includes the cities of Sidon and Jezzine, other, more limited definitions exclude them, defining them as separate areas. The traditional definition also includes parts of modern Israel, including the former villages of al-Bassa and al-Khalisa, and the villages of Tarbikha, Qadas, Hunin, al-Nabi Yusha', and Saliha, whose inhabitants had been Twelver Shia before their depopulation in the 1948 Palestine war. In the definition of Lebanon specialist Elisabeth Picard, the northern boundary of Jabal Amil is formed by the Zahrani River, south of Sidon. The historian William Harris defines it as the hills south of the Litani, which "grade into the Upper Galilee". According to Stefan Winter, Jabal Amil is traditionally defined as the predominantly Twelver Shia-populated, highland region southeast of Sidon. A prominent native scholar of Jabal Amil, Suleiman Dahir, defined it in 1930 as a much larger area, encompassing Jezzine in the Chouf, Baalbek in the northern Beqaa, and the Hula.

== History ==
Historical accounts suggest a Shiite presence at Jabal Amil by the 10th century, with the arrival of Shia-oriented Yemeni tribes like the Amilah. However, local traditions claim an even earlier conversion to Twelver Shi'ism by a companion of the Prophet Muhammad, Abu Dharr al-Ghifari.

Despite claims of being the earliest Shi'ite center, evidence points to Hillah in Iraq as a prominent center of religious learning for early Amili scholars (12th–14th centuries). It wasn't until the 14th century that Jabal Amil saw the rise of its own scholarly institutions and a surge in the number of Shi'ite scholars. This culminated in the 15th and 16th centuries, when Jabal Amil became the leading center of Shi'ite learning, with a focus on legal, linguistic, and doctrinal studies. However, by the 16th century, economic and political factors led to a decline in these institutions and a mass migration of Amili scholars – particularly to Safavid Iran – that lasted for about two centuries. The Safavids' invited Shi'ite scholars from Jabal Amil to their court to legitimize their rule over predominantly Sunni Persia and promote Shi'ite conversion.

Much like Mount Lebanon served as a haven for Christians in the Levant, particularly Maronites, as well as the Druze, Jabal Amil became a refuge for Shia communities, offering relative safety from Sunni rule and intermittent persecution, especially following the restoration of Sunni dominance in the Levant after the fall of Crusader rule.

== Mount Amel Castles ==
Mount Amel Castles
UNESCO World Heritage Site
- Criteria: Cultural: (ii)(iv)
- Reference: 1810
- Inscription: 2026 (48th Session)
- Area: 10.48 ha (25.9 acres)
- Buffer zone: 48.14 ha (119.0 acres)

The Mount Amel Castles comprise five fortified sites in southern Lebanon: Beaufort, Toron, Dubieh, Maron, and Chamaa Castles. Built and adapted from the medieval period to the 19th century, they formed a strategic defensive and administrative network influenced by Crusader, Ayyubid, Mamluk, Ottoman, and local rulers. In July 2026, they were designated a UNESCO World Heritage Site and subsequently classified as endangered.

Locations of the UNESCO World Heritage Site Mount Amel Castles
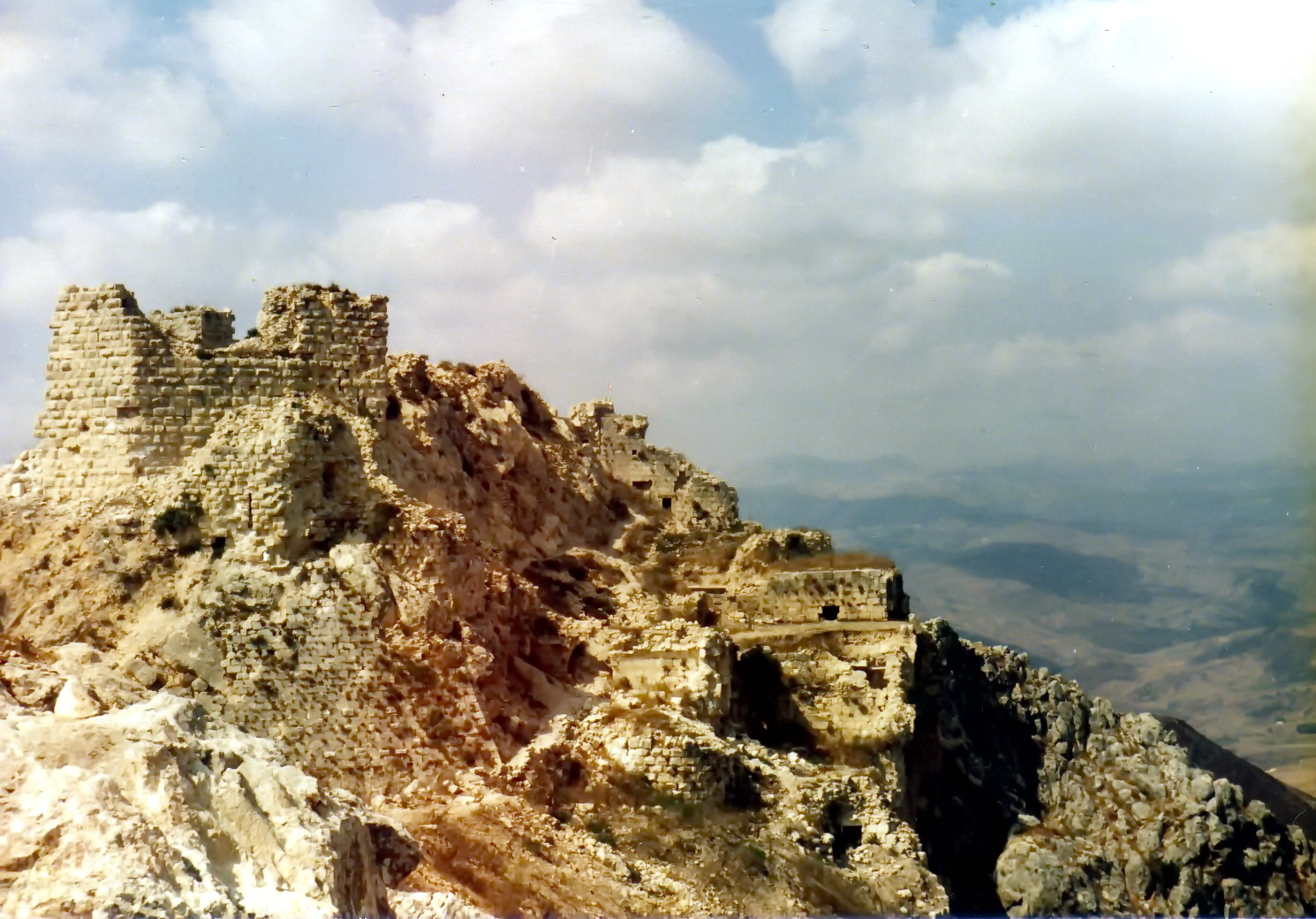
Beaufort

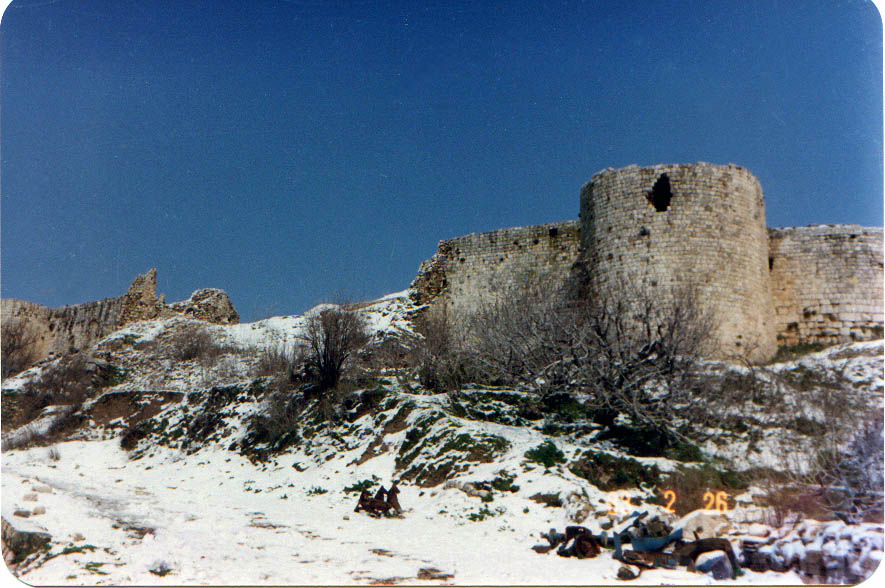
Toron

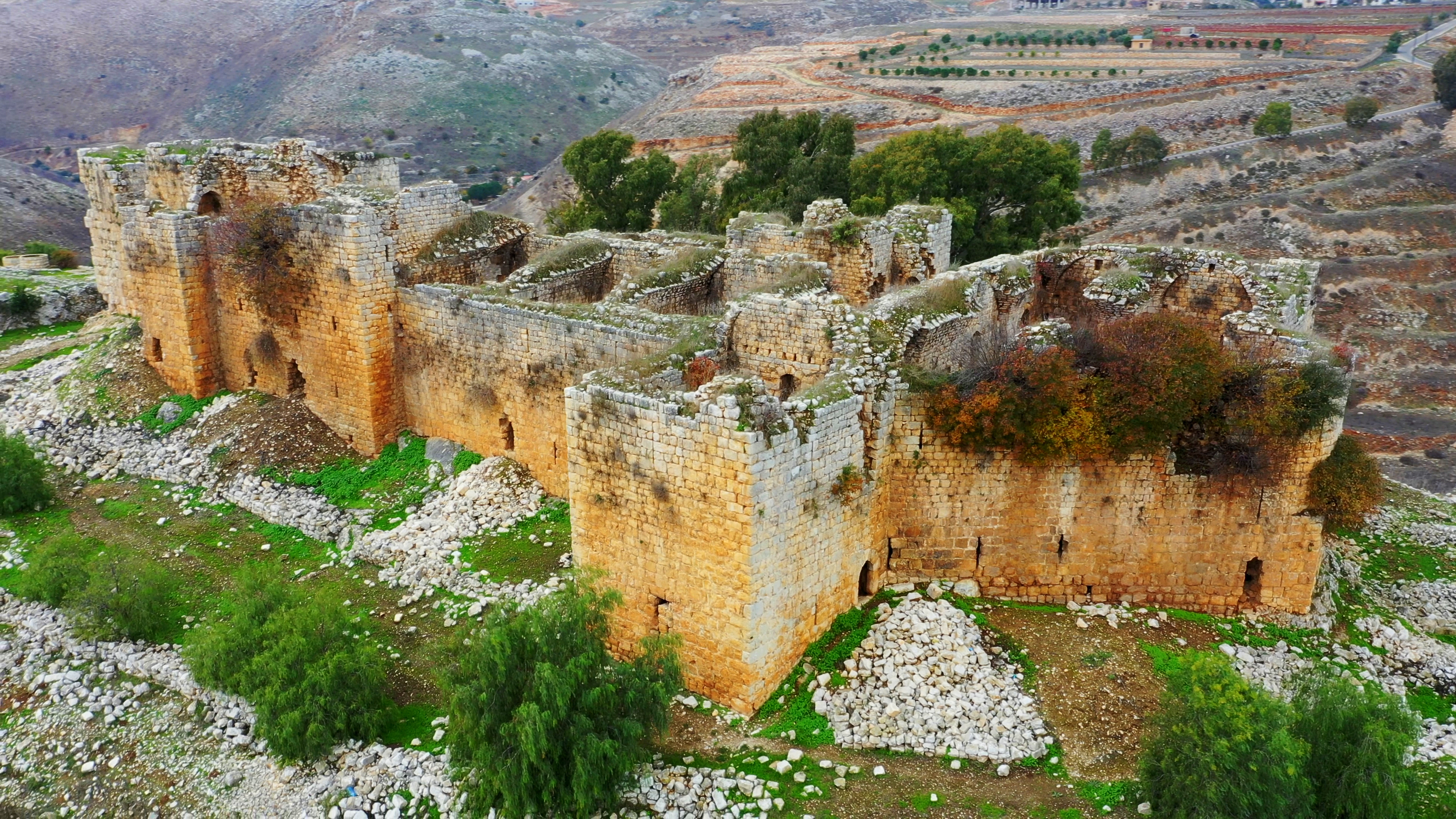
Dubieh

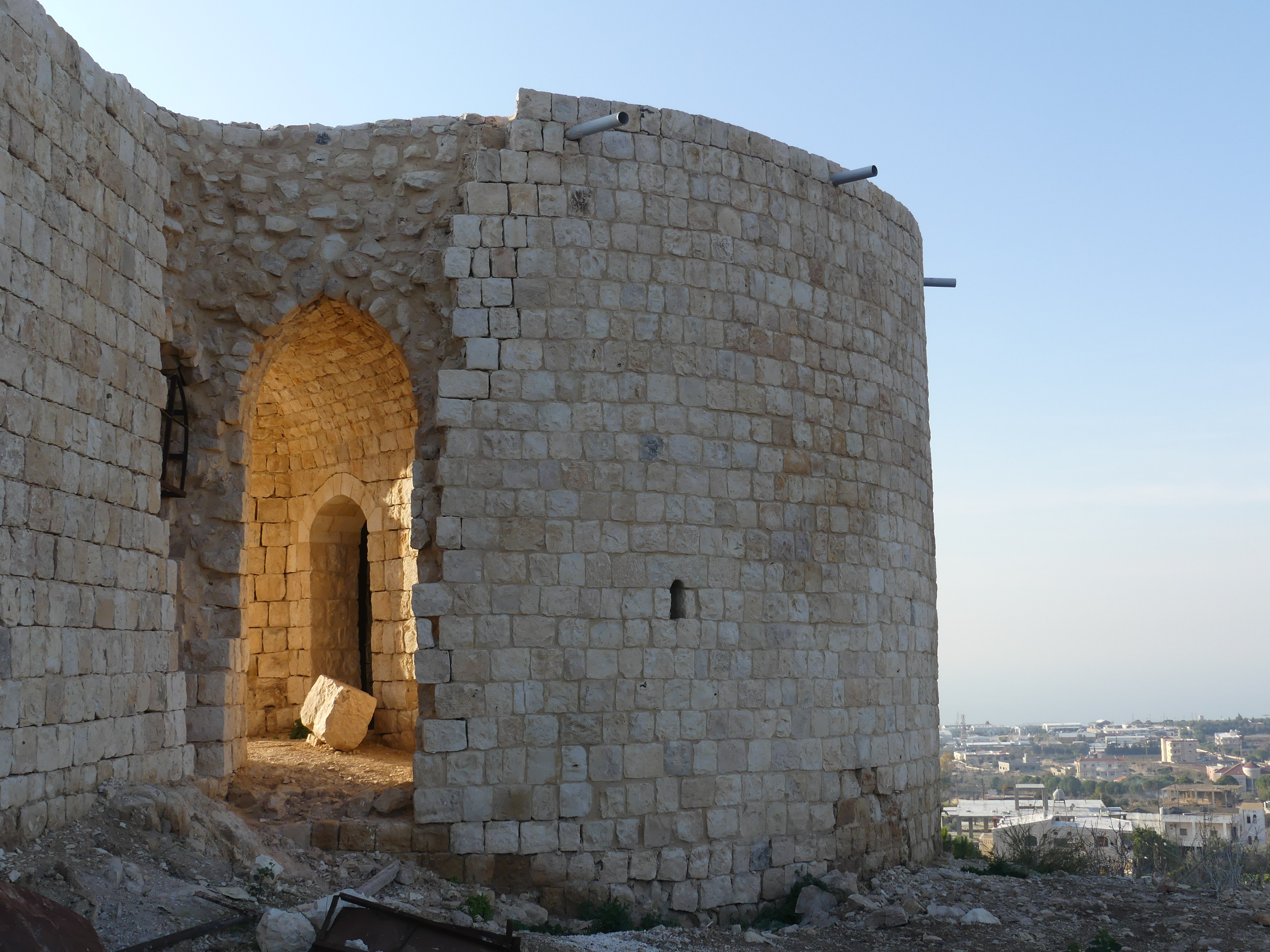
Chamaa

== Notable residents ==
- Twelver Shia scholar, Al-Hurr al-Amili (1624–1693)
- Nuclear physicist, Rammal Hassan Rammal (1951–1991)
- Shi'a Islamic scholar, Abd al-Husayn Sharaf al-Din al-Musawi (1872–1957)
- Ottoman-era Shia leader from El Assaad Family, Nasif al-Nassar (1749–1781)
- Secretary General of Hezbollah, Hassan Nasrallah (1960–2024)
- Scientist, Hassan Kamel Al-Sabbah (1894–1935)
- Shi'a Islamic Poet and Scholar Sheikh Bahaddin al-Amili (1547–1621)
- El Zein family
- Twelver Shia Scholar Sayyid Mohsen al-Amin (1867–1952)
- former minister and member of parliament Abdallah al Amin (1946–2023)

== Bibliography ==
- Booth, Marilyn (2021). The Career and Communities of Zaynab Fawwaz: Feminist Thinking in Fin-de-siècle Egypt. Oxford: Oxford University Press. ISBN 978-0-19-284619-8.
- Chalabi, Tamara (2006). The Shi'is of Jabal Amil and the New Lebanon: Community and Nation State, 1918-1943. New York and Hampshire: Palgrave Macmillan. ISBN 978-1-349-53194-3.
- Harris, William (2012). Lebanon: A History, 600–2011. New York: Oxford University Press. ISBN 978-0-19-518111-1.
- Mallat, Chibli (1988). Shi'i Thought from the South of Lebanon (PDF). Oxford: Centre for Lebanese Studies. ISBN 9781870552073.
- Picard, Elisabeth (1993), The Lebanese Shi'a and Political Violence, UNRISID
- Strange, le, G. (1890). Palestine Under the Moslems: A Description of Syria and the Holy Land from A.D. 650 to 1500. Committee of the Palestine Exploration Fund.
- Winter, Stefan (2010). The Shiites of Lebanon under Ottoman Rule, 1516–1788. Cambridge: Cambridge University Press. ISBN 978-0-521-76584-8.
