= El Zein family =

Lebanese family

El Zein الزين
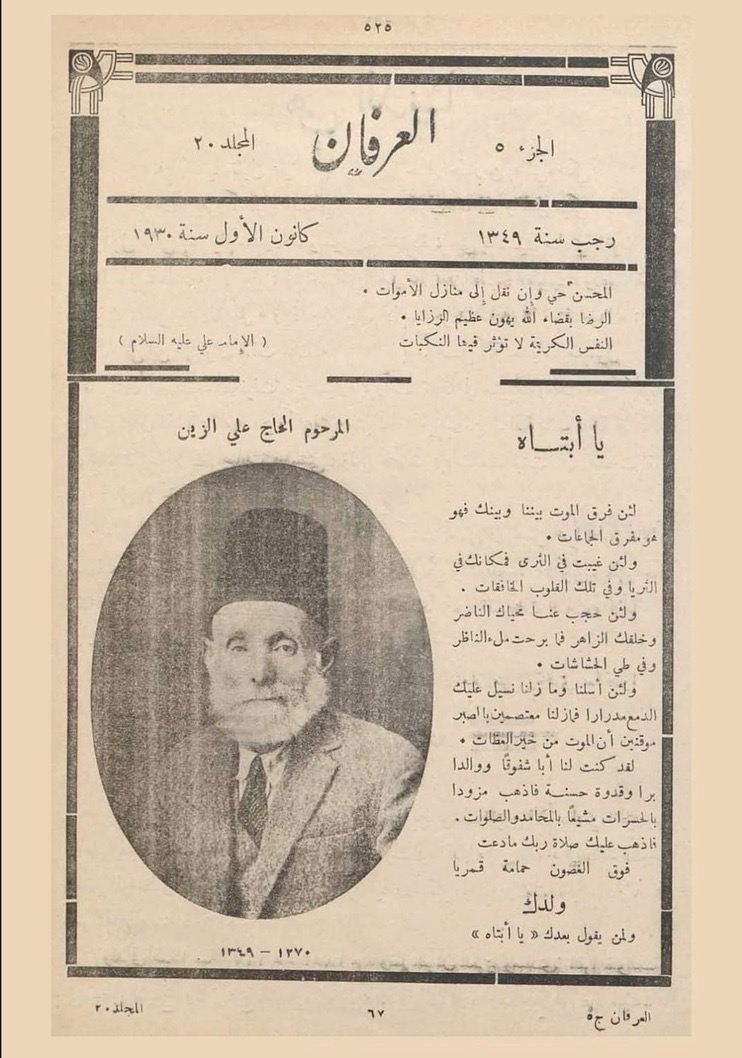
- Page of Al-Irfan newspaper magazine 1909
- Country: Lebanon
- Current region: Jabal Amil, modern-day South Lebanon
- Origin: Medina, Saudi Arabia
- Titles: Bek or Bey; Sheikh; Efendi
- Connected families: El Khalil

The El Zein or Al-Zayn (Arabic: الزين) family is a prominent feudal Lebanese family with large estates in Jabal Amil (southern Lebanon), mainly in Shehour, Jebchit, and Kfar Reman. Members of the family now reside in different locations of Lebanon and among the Lebanese diaspora.

The family traces its lineage to Zain Al-Abidin Al-Ansari Al-Khazraji, a descendant of Sa’d ibn 'Ubadah, a companion of the Prophet Muhammad, and leader of the Khazraj tribe, who settled in Jabal Amil during Saladin's campaign in the 12th century.

Historically, members of the El Zein family held social and political positions due to their vast feudal estates in the Jabal Amil region. In the 18th century, Sheikh Ali El Zein "Al-Kabir", also referred to as the "Proprietor of Shehour", led the local resistance against the Ottoman governor Jazzar Pasha's invasion of Jabal Amil under the leadership of Nasif Al-Nassar.

The family contributed to intellectual and cultural advancements through initiatives and publications such as the magazine Al-Irfan, founded in 1909, which addressed topics relevant to Ottoman, Arab, and inter-communal Lebanese communities. Members of the family have authored numerous works on the history of Jabal Amil, other writings in Lebanon, and abroad. In 2024, Lebanese-Australian author Abbas El Zein received two awards for his English-language memoir.

== Origins ==
According to the scholar and historian Sheikh Ali Sebiti in his work The History of the Families of Jabal Amel (تاريخ عائلات عامل), the El Zein family descends from Zain Al-Abidin, known as Al Zain Al-Ansari Al-Khazraji. He originated from Medina and was a descendant of Sa’d ibn 'Ubadah, a companion of the Prophet Muhammad, and leader of the Khazraj tribe.

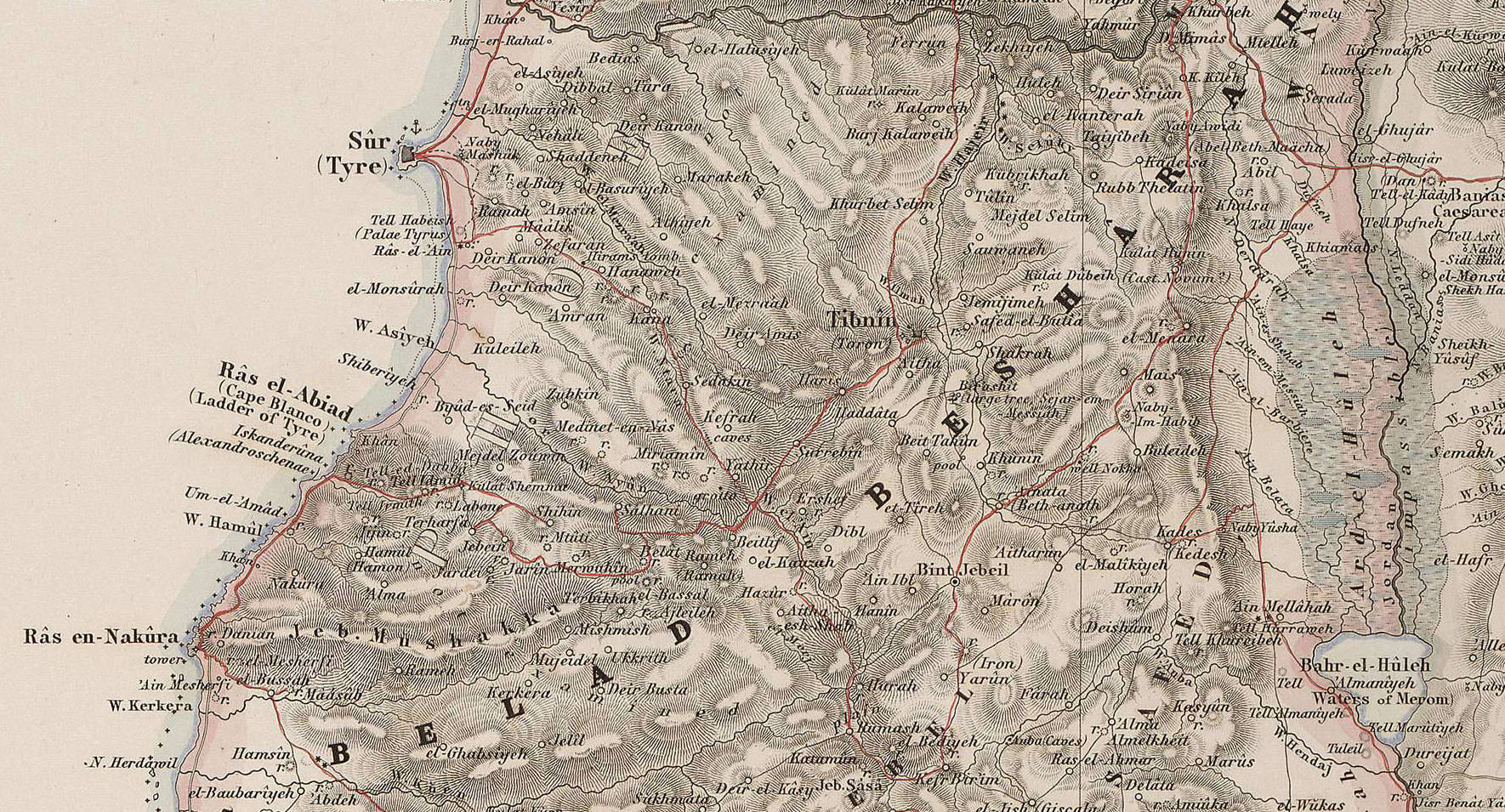
Belad Besharah in the 1858 van de Velde maps

It is reported that Zain Al-Abidin migrated from Medina to Egypt, and then to Syria. He served as one of Saladdin's commanders during the 1178 campaign in Palestine and Syria, alongside Prince Abi Al-Qasim Al-Hasani, who oversaw the coast of Tyre. Hossam Al-Din Bishara, Saladdin's nephew, ruled the Beshara region (southern Lebanon), while Zain Al-Abidin was appointed governor of the Tebnine fortress.

== Zein Al-Din El Zein ==
Sheikh Khalil bin Musa bin Yusuf El Zein, a descendant of Zein Al-Abidin, settled in the village of Shehour where his son, Sheikh Zein Al-Din El Zein, was born in 1747. Zein Al-Din was sent to Najaf in Iraq, where he studied jurisprudence and the science of Hadith for fifteen years.

Upon returning to Shehour, he undertook religious responsibilities and community leadership. He was executed by the Ottoman governor Jazzar Pasha, who deemed him a threat, burning his personal library of more than 3,000 volumes in the process. Zein Al-Din El Zein left behind five sons, including Ali El Zein "Al Kabir".

== Role of Ali El Zein “Al Kabir” ==
Sheikh Ali El Zein "Al-Kabir", known as the "Proprietor of Shehour", managed local affairs under Ottoman rule, in cooperation with Acre's governors after succeeding his father Sheikh Zein Al-Din El Zein. The Sublime Porte (Ottoman central authority) entrusted him with regional administration in exchange for an annual tax. His authority extended along the coast from Sidon to Naqoura, and inland from Shehour to Baraachit.

In 1776, Ahmad Pasha “Al-Jazzar” (the Butcher), became governor of Acre and ruler of the region. Tensions arose between him and the residents of Jabal Amel due to his imposition of harsh oppressive policies and increased taxes.

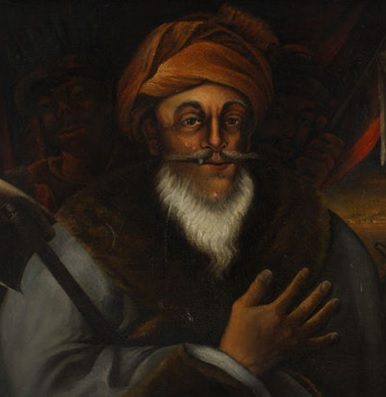
Ahmad Pasha Al-Jazzar

In 1783, local leaders assembled in Shehour. Hamza bin Muhammad Al-Nassar and Sheikh Ali El Zein “Al Kabir” led the opposition and organized the defense campaign against Jazzar Pasha under Nasif Al-Nassar's leadership. Their forces attacked Jazzar's officials in Tebnine, killing the local governor, and his aides, then seizing the royal treasury.

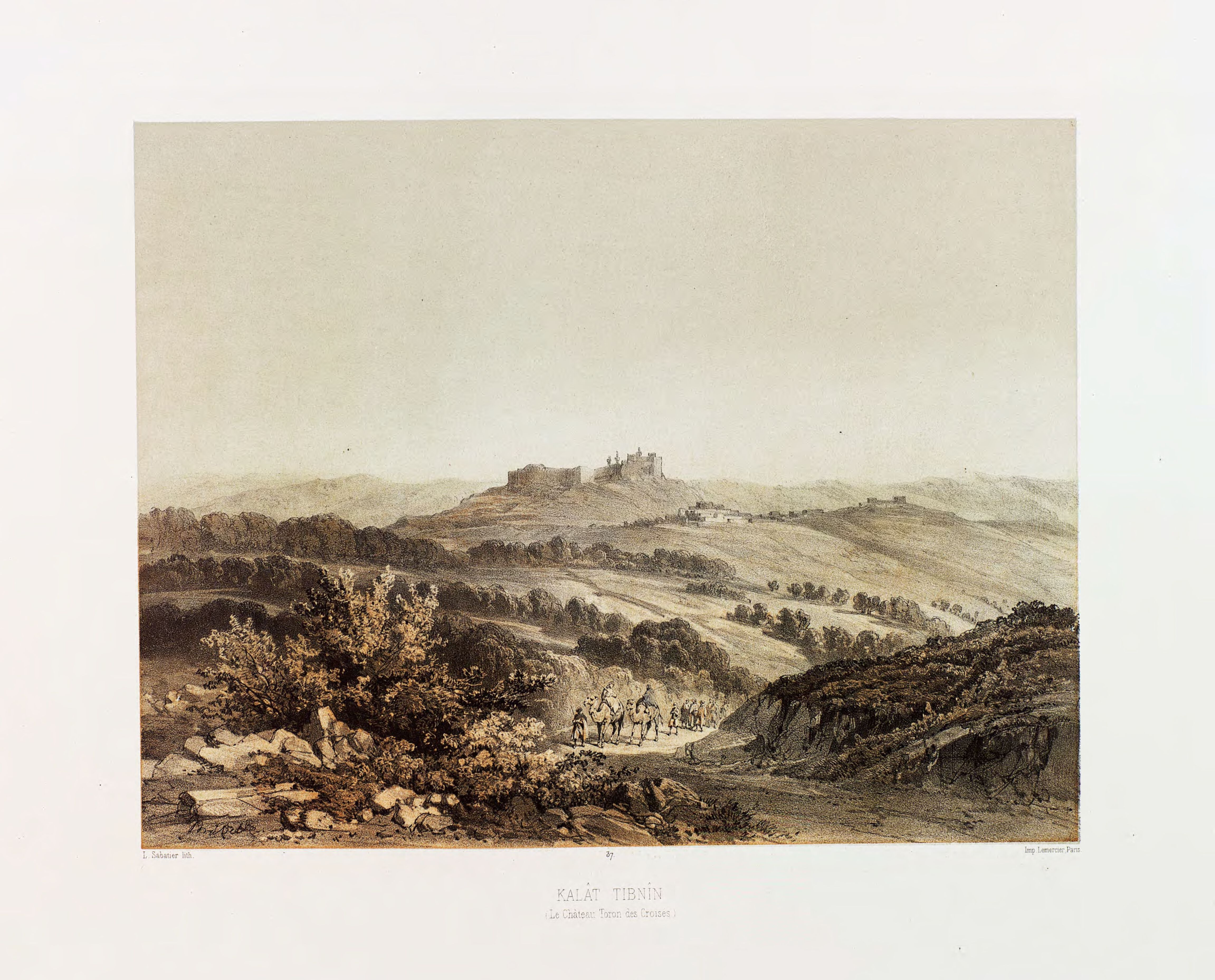
Tebnine Fortress

Jazzar Pasha responded by sending forces to Shehour, resulting in the death of Hamza Al-Nassar. Sheikh Ali El Zein and his companions first fled to Iraq, then to Iran, and eventually to India where one of the Indian Maharajas appointed him as a vizier eventually returning to his homeland after the British invasion of India. Peace was not restored to Jabal Amil until Jazzar died in 1804. During the subsequent administration of Suleiman Pasha, a meeting attended by Bashir Al-Shehabi and Faris Nassif Al-Nassar ended with a general pardon, and the restitution of confiscated properties to original owners.

== Suleiman bin Ali El Zein ==
Sheikh Suleiman El Zein, son of Ali El Zein “Al-Kabir”, had assumed his father's leadership following his death in 1838. He was a poet and a patron of the Jbaa religious school founded by Sheikh Abdullah Nehme. He established strong relations with officials such as Fuad Pasha, a representative of the Ottoman Grand Vizier. Later in life, Suleiman relocated to Sidon where he became involved in commerce, contributed to social, and economic development in the region.

Following his death in 1872, Suleiman's children managed the family's leadership responsibilities, each settling in different villages: Hussein in Jebchit, Muhammad and Ismail in Kfar Reman, and Ali in Shehour.

== Notable descendants of Hussein El Zein ==
Sheikh Hussein bin Suleiman El Zein, referred to as "Abu Khalil," was a scholar and student of Sheikh Abdullah Nehme at the Jbaa Religious School. He later settled in the village of Jebchit, where he resided until he died in 1884. He had two sons: Khalil and Abdel-Karim.

Sheikh Khalil bin Hussein El Zein – A scholar in Islamic jurisprudence who studied under Musa Shararah and had five children, including Muhammad bin Khalil.

Sheikh Muhammad bin Khalil El Zein – Specialized in Islamic studies in Najaf before returning to Beirut. He founded the Guidance and Enlightenment Society (جمعية الهداية والإرشاد), focusing on inter-sectarian dialogue. He authored several works, including The History of Islamic Sects (تاريخ الفرق الإسلامية) and Islamic Principles and Branches (لأصول والفروع الإسلامية).

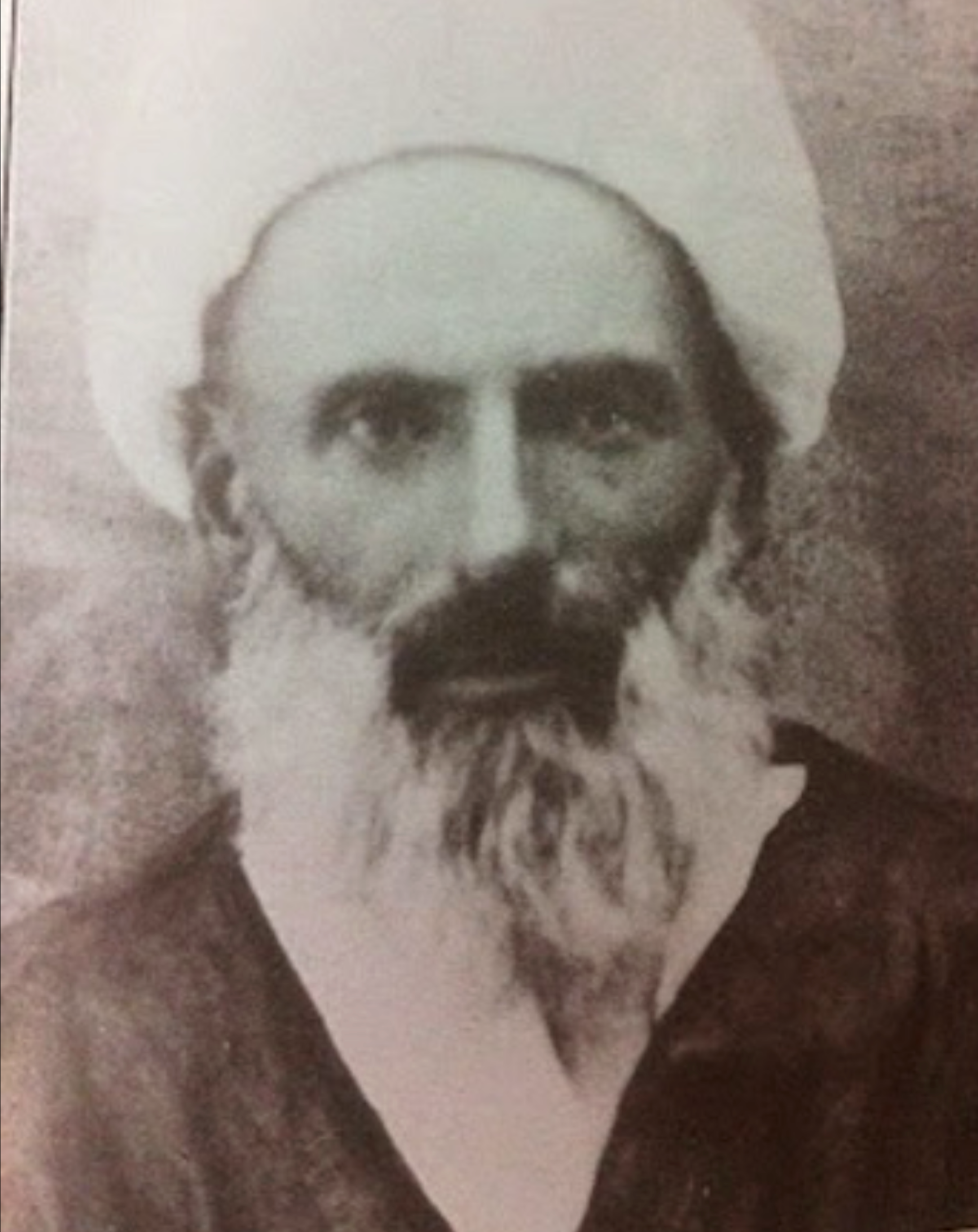
Sheikh Abdul-Karim El Zein

Sheikh Abdul-Karim bin Hussein El Zein – A scholar, poet, and writer, known for his ownership of large estates, he authored numerous works in theology, literature, and medicine. He studied in Najaf under scholars of Islamic jurisprudence and principles for 20 years before returning to Jebchit, where he succeeded his father. Sheikh Abdul-Karim opposed Ottoman rule and was accused of involvement in secret societies, narrowly escaping execution in 1915. He died in 1941, leaving behind three sons: Muhammad Hussein, Ali, and Jaafar.

Sheikh Muhammad Hussein bin Abdul Karim El Zein – A religious scholar, poet, judge, and author, best known for The Rightly Guided Caliphs (الخلفاء الراشدون) and Shia in History (الشيعة في التاريخ). He studied in Najaf and later served as a judge in Marjeyoun and Nabatiyeh.

Sheikh Ali bin Abdul-Karim El Zein (died 1984) – A revisionist historian and critic who was the founder of the Ameli Literature League in 1936 (عصبة الأدب العاملي سنة ١٩٣٦). His works include In Search of Our History (للبحث عن تاريخنا) and others.

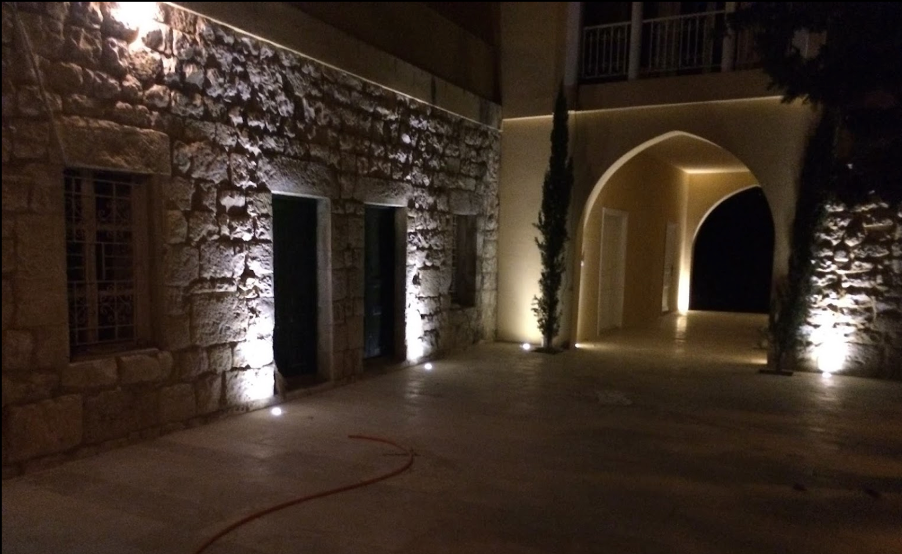
El Zein family residence in Jebchit (دار آل الزين في جبشيت)

Dr. Hassan bin Ali El Zein – Author and previous editor-in-chief of Al-Irfan magazine. His works include The Legal Status of Christians and Jews in the Islamic State until the Ottoman Conquest (Les conditions juridiques des juifs et des chrétiens en pays d'Islam, jusqu'à la conquete Ottomane), which was his doctoral thesis (Doctorat d'Etat) in the Sorbonne University in Paris.

Jehad El Zein – Son of Hassan, is a political writer in the Middle East, poet, analyst, former editor of As-Safir newspaper, and current writer for An-Nahar newspaper.

Abbas El Zein – Son of Hassan, is a professor at the University of Sydney and award-winning non-fiction writer in Australia. His works include the books Leave to Remain and Bullet Paper Rock.

== Notable descendants of Ismail El Zein ==
Sheikh Ismail Suleiman El Zein was a Lebanese merchant, politician, and landowner. He inherited his father Suleiman El Zein's estates and political leadership, expanding his land acquisitions, including the village of Kfar Reman, through trade ventures. In 1909, Ismail was assassinated following accusations of oppressive behaviour towards his workers. His sons include Hussein, Youssef Bek, and Hassan Efendi, whose grandson was the Lebanese Army Colonel Rafic El Zein.

Hajj Hussein bin Ismail El Zein was a politician, born in 1876 in the town of Kfar Reman. He established the first charitable school in Nabatiye and held several positions during the French Mandate period, including Member of the Administrative Committee for the South (1920–1922), Member of the Senate (1926–1927), and Member of the First Chamber of Deputies (1927–1929).

=== Youssef Bek El Zein ===
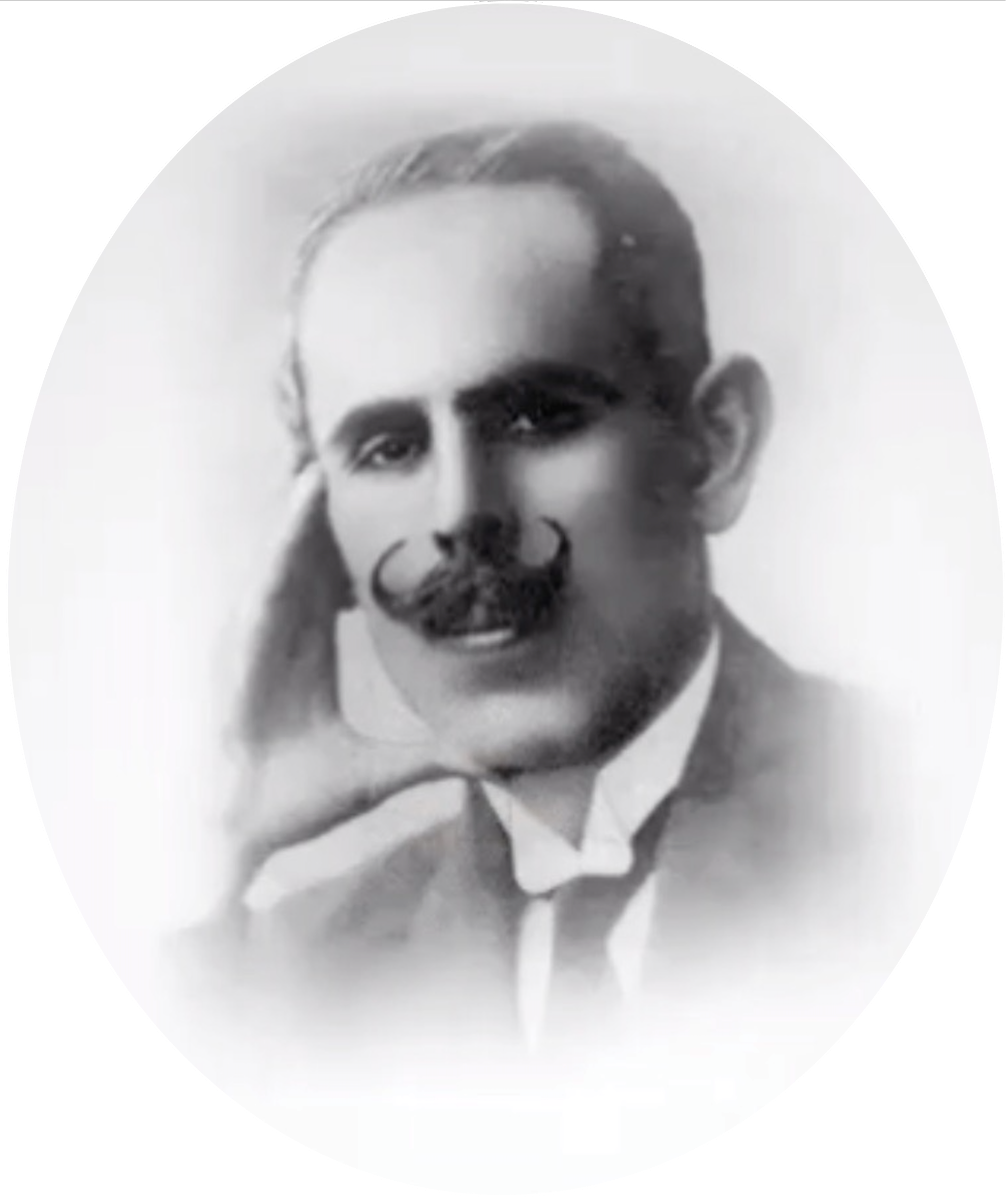
Youssef Bek El Zein

Youssef Bek bin Ismail El Zein was a politician and za’im of Kfar Reman. He inherited significant estates from his father, Ismail El Zein, and focused on politics rather than commerce or agriculture.

Serving in the first advisory council for Nabatieh and the first representative council in 1922, he was elected to the Lebanese Parliament in 1926. He maintained his representation of Nabatiyeh until his death. After the decline of the El Assaad family's political influence, Youssef Bek became the dominant political leader in southern Lebanon. His achievements included renovating the Al-Hamidiya School in Nabatiyeh, supporting the Maqasid Charity Association, and financing a major water project in 1925 to supply Nabatieh and its surroundings. Three of his sons followed in his footsteps as parliamentarians: Abdul Latif, Abdul Majeed, and Abdul Karim El Zein.

Abdul Latif Bek bin Youssef El Zein – Politician and former member of the Lebanese Parliament. He studied law at the Collège de la Sagesse and Saint Joseph University in Beirut, and held office as a member of the Lebanese Parliament from 1960 until 2018. He also served as Lebanon's minister of agriculture.

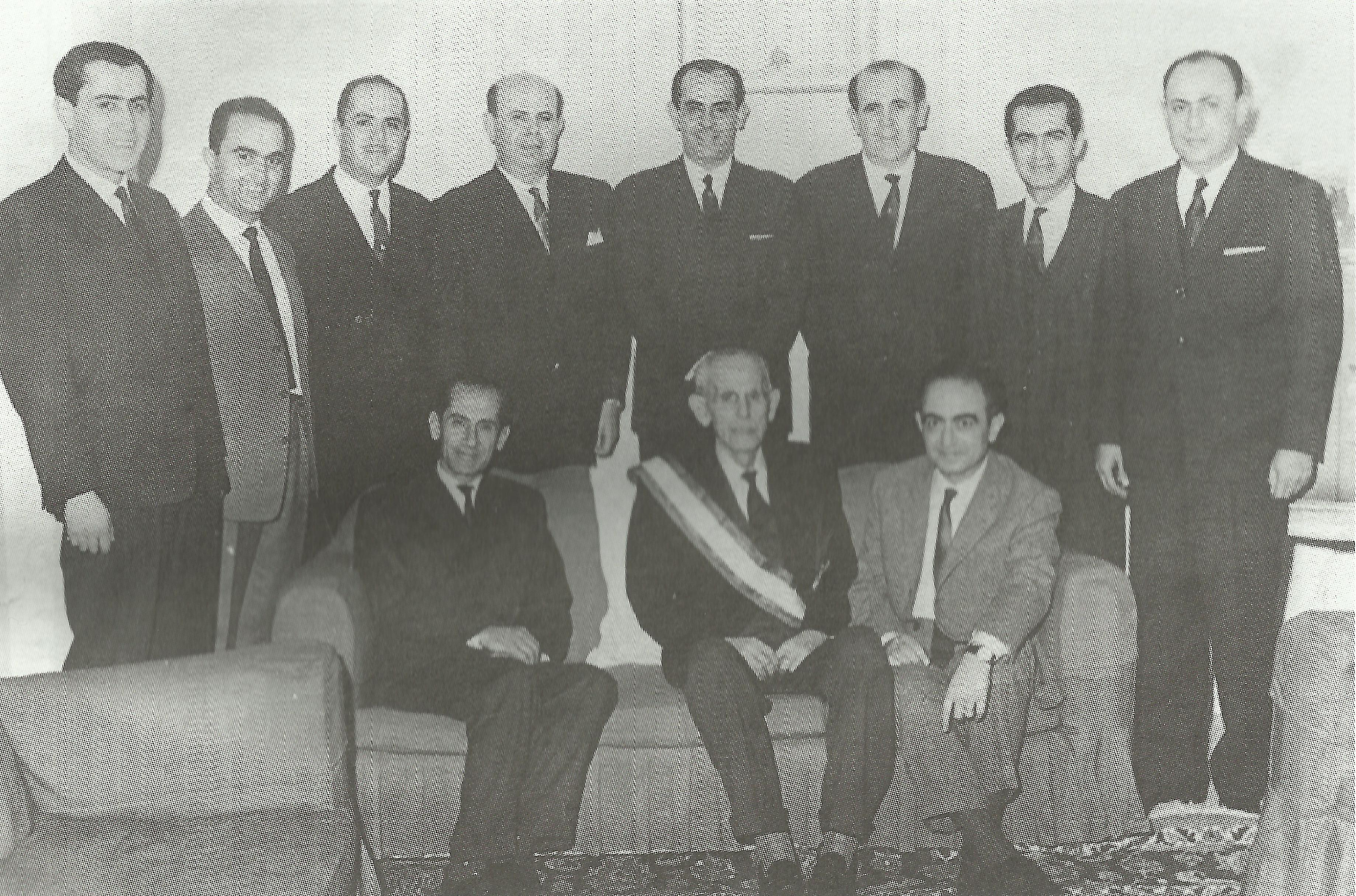
Youssef Bek El Zein with his children

Abdul Majeed Bek bin Youssef El Zein – Officer in the Internal Security Forces, politician, and former Member of the Lebanese Parliament. He entered politics after resigning from the military and served on the parliamentary committees for foreign affairs and defence, serving as an MP until 1972.

Abdul Karim Bek Youssef bin Youssef El Zein – Soldier, politician, and former Member of the Lebanese Parliament. He graduated from the Military Academy with the rank of lieutenant. He was elected as a Member of the Lebanese Parliament in 1964, representing the Zahrani district in southern Lebanon, and served on the Parliamentary Committees for Finance and Budget as well as Agriculture.

== Notable descendants of Muhammad El Zein ==
Sheikh Muhammad bin Suleiman El Zein, along with his brother Abu Khalil, studied in Jbaa. He authored a book on jurisprudence titled Rasa'il fi al-Fiqh (رسائل في الفقه) and another book titled Sharh al-Nizam (شرح النظام) along with other works. He was born in Sidon in 1830 and died there in 1902. He travelled to Najaf but returned upon his father's death without completing his studies there. He had five children, including Muhammad Rida bin Muhammad El Zein.

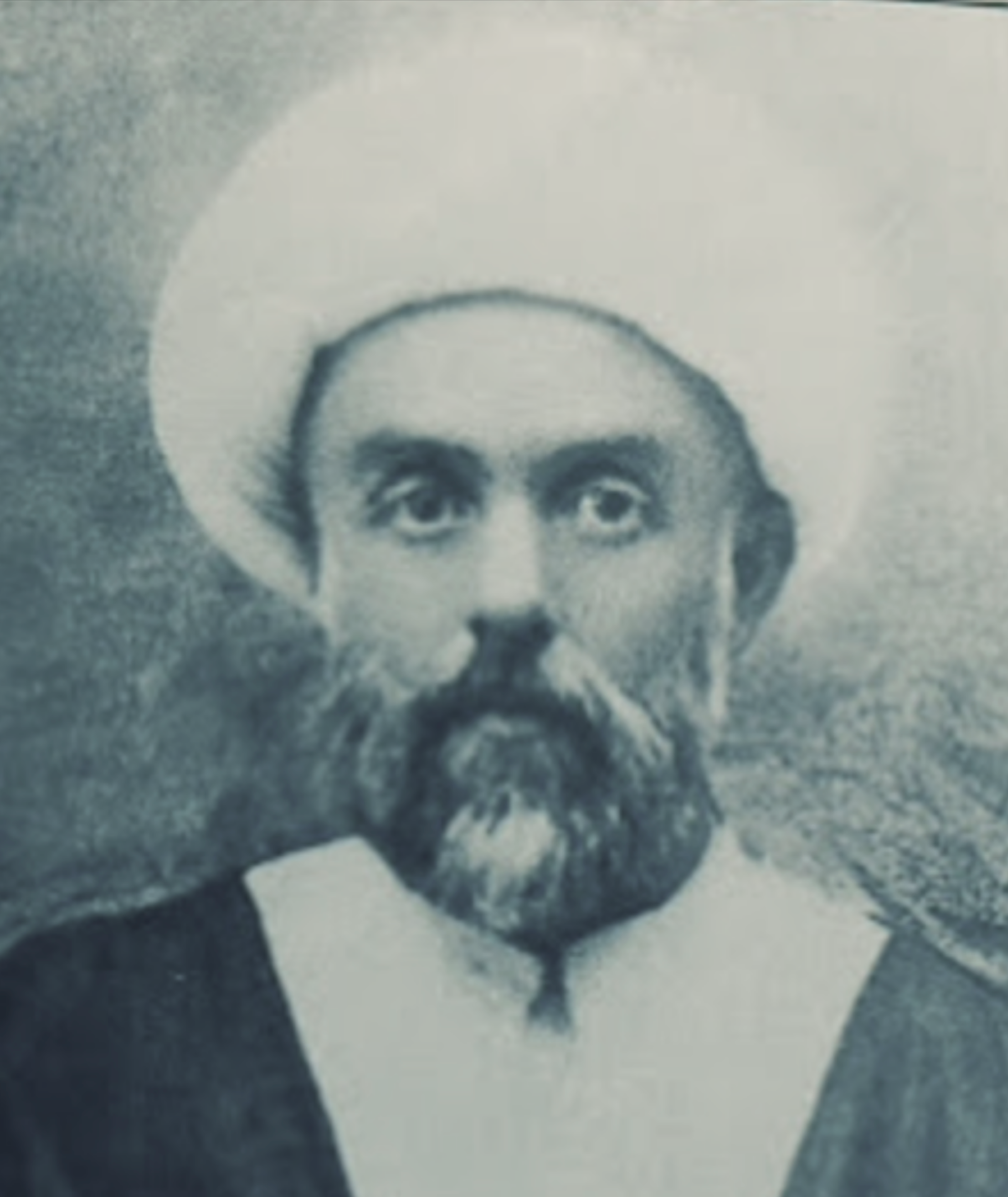
Sheikh Muhammad Rida El Zein

=== Sheikh Muhammad Rida bin Muhammad El Zein ===
Sheikh Muhammad Rida El Zein was a scholar, poet, and teacher. After completing his early education in Sidon and Nabatiyeh, he traveled to Najaf in 1898 where he studied under scholars such as Muhammad Kazim al-Khurasani and Fethullah Isfahani. He worked as a trader in Baghdad and later returned to South Lebanon, settling in Kfar Reman and working as a judge in Nabatieh.

His poetry compositions addressed themes such as religion, hardship, brotherhood, social issues, wisdom, and moral guidance. He participated in literary debates, and among his writings are Islamic History (التاريخ الإسلام) and The El Zein family in History (آل الزين في التاريخ). He died in 1946 and was buried in Kfar Reman.

== Notable descendants of Ali El Zein ==
Hajj Ali bin Suleiman El Zein was born in Sidon in 1860. He moved to the town of Shehour, where he resided and managed his father's extensive properties in Jabal Amil, dying in 1931, leaving behind four sons, namely, Labib, Atif, Abdel-Ala'a and Ahmad Aref.

=== Sheikh Ahmad Aref bin Ali El Zein ===
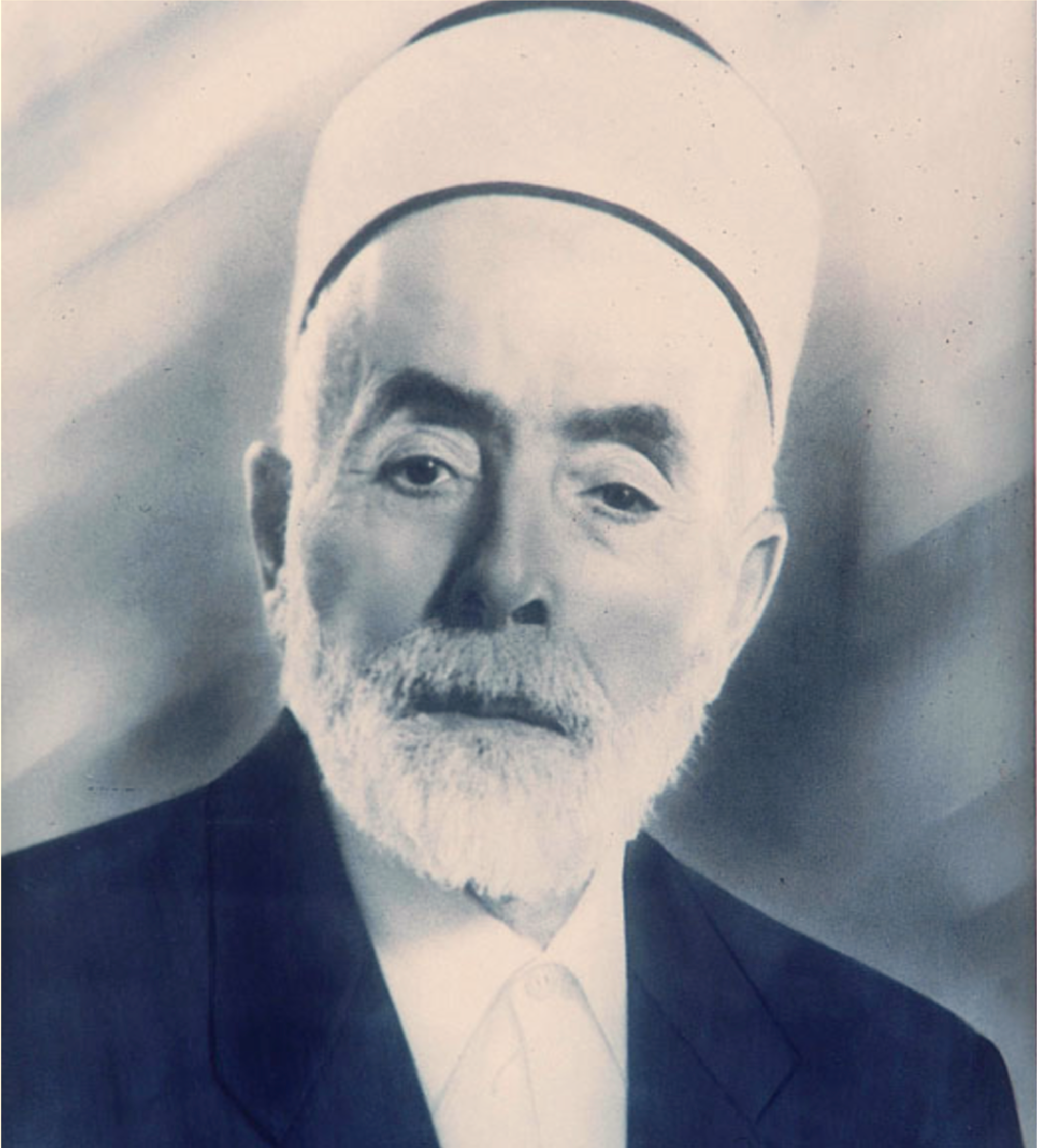
Sheikh Ahmad Aref El Zein

Sheikh Ahmad Aref El Zein was a writer, journalist, and reformist from Shehour. He sought educational reforms and the reconciliation of Islamic values with Western ideas of liberty and democracy. He founded Al-Irfan magazine (1909) and Jabal Amel newspaper (1911), contributing to cultural and political thought in the region. El Zein actively participated in various reformist and revolutionary organizations, including the Arab Youth Society and the League of the Arab Revolution. He was a pioneer of the Shiite religious Nahda.

He was imprisoned multiple times under Ottoman rule and later during the French Mandate due to his support for the Syrian Revolution, and opposition to colonialism. El Zein advocated for educational, agricultural, and administrative reforms. He authored several notable works and also published and edited key literary and religious texts through the printing press of Al-Irfan. Ahmad Aref El-Zein died on October 15, 1960, during a trip to Iran, where he was visiting the cities of Qom and Mashhad. He was buried in the shrine of Imam Reza in Mashhad with the approval of Mohammad Reza Pahlavi.

Sameh Atef El Zein – Writer and author of works such as Islam and Human Ideology.

== See also ==
- Ahmad El Zein – actor in Lebanon and the Arab world
- Ali El Zein – Lebanese actor
- Sarah El Zein – poet and writer in the Arab world.
- Tamara El Zein – current environmental minister in Prime Minister's Salam's cabinet.
- List of political families in Lebanon
- Jabal Amil
- Safed Sanjak
- Al-Irfan
- Shehour
- Kfar Reman
- Belad Bechara
- Jebchit

== Bibliography ==
- Sbeiti, Ali. تاريخ عائلات عامل للشيخ علي سبيتي [The History of the Families of Jabal Amel] (in Arabic)
- أحمد, خليل، خليل (2006). الكوميديا السياسية: وجوه في مرآتي (in Arabic). AIRP. ISBN 978-9953-36-873-3.
- خازم, يوسف (2017-01-01). عبد الكريم الخليل: مشعل العرب الأول، 1884 - 1915 (in Arabic). Al Manhal. ISBN 9796500283012.
- al-Dīn, ʻAbd Allāh Sharaf (1991). مع موسوعات رجال الشيعة (in Arabic). الإرشاد للطباعة والنشر
- فواز ،الدكتور, حكمت كشلي (1996-01-01). الشيخ أحمد رضا وجهوده المعجمية - جزء - 5 / مجموعة دراسات معجمية (in Arabic). Dar Al Kotob Al Ilmiyah دار الكتب العلمية.
- Al-Sallabi, Ali Mohammad; الصلابي, علي محمد محمد (2024-01-01). Salahaddin al-Ayyubi | صلاح الدين الأيوبي وجهوده في القضاء على الدولة الفاطمية وتحرير بيت المقدس (in Arabic). Asalet Yayınları. ISBN 978-625-6752-96-2.
- IslamKotob. الموسوعة الشاملة في تاريخ الحروب الصليبية - ج 19 (in Arabic)
- IslamKotob. معجم المؤلفين - ج1 (in Arabic)
- الأميني النجفي, عبد الحسين. شهداء الفضيلة لآية الله [The Martyrdom of the Virtuous, Abdul Hussein Al-Amini Al-Najafi] (in Arabic).
- Ziriklī, Khayr al-Dīn (2002). al-Aʻlām: al-Dahhān-ʻAbd al-Salām (in Arabic). Dār al-ʻIlm lil-Malāyīn.
- خليل, أرزوني، (2001). تاريخ شحور الاجتماعي، ٠٠٩١-٠٠٠٢: خطط دار العز (in Arabic). دار الإنسانية
- القادر, با مطرف، محمد عبد (1980). الجامع: جامع شمل أعلام المهاجرين المنتسبين إلى اليمن وقبائلهم (in Arabic). الجمهورية العراقية، وزارة الثقافة، دار الرشيد للنشر
- سعيد, طريحي، محمد (2005). أعلام الهند (in Arabic). مؤسسة البلاغ ISBN 978-90-809737-2-5.
- Ǧūda, Aḥmad Ḥasan (1987). Revolt in Palestine in the eighteenth century: the era of Shaykh Zahir al-ʿUmar. Leaders, politics and social change in the Islamic world. Princeton, NJ: Kingston Pr. ISBN 978-0-940670-11-2.
- Winter, Stefan (2010-03-11). The Shiites of Lebanon under Ottoman Rule, 1516–1788. Cambridge University Press. ISBN 978-1-139-48681-1.
- Harris, William (2012-06-12). Lebanon: A History, 600 - 2011. Oxford University Press. ISBN 978-0-19-972059-0.
- منار الهدى، دروس تمهيدية في المعارف الإسلامية / تأليف مركز المعارف للتأليف والتحقيق [Manar Al-Huda: Introductory Lessons in Islamic Knowledge, authored by the Center for Composition and Research] (in Arabic).
- تكملة أمل الآمل - السيد حسن الصدر - باب العين - ترجمة رقم 248
- الأمين, السيد محسن. خطط جبل عامل [The Lines of Jabal Amel by Sayyed Mohsen Al-Amin] (in Arabic).
- Amīn, Ḥasan (1972). دائرة المعارف الإسلامية الشيعية (in Arabic).
- من دفتر الذكريات الجنوبية (in Arabic). دار الكتاب اللبناني،. 1981.
- Ṣafaḥāt min tārīkh jabal ʻĀmil (in Arabic). Dār al-Fārābī. 1979.
- Buckingham, James Silk (2011-12-29). Travels in Palestine, through the Countries of Bashan and Gilead, East of the River Jordan. Cambridge University Press. doi:10.1017/cbo9781139162456. ISBN 978-1-108-04217-8.
- Mishāqa, Mikhāyil (1988-01-01). Murder, Mayhem, Pillage, and Plunder: The History of the Lebanon in the 18th and 19th Centuries by Mikhāyil Mishāqa (1800-1873). SUNY Press. ISBN 978-0-88706-712-9.
- Nahel, Osama Abu (15 April 2021). The Feudal Rule of Mutawila of Jabal Amel under the Ottoman Era 1804-1830 A.D (published 2021) doi:10.21021/osmed.789531.
- El Amine, Mohamed Mohsen, أعيان الشيعة للسير محمد محسن الامين [A‘yan Al-Shia Vol. 7,8,9] (in Arabic).
- موسوعة قرى ومدن لبنان ج ١٥ [Mawsu‘at Qura wa Madan Lubnan] (in Arabic)
- Sulaymān, Ibrāhīm Āl (1995). بلدان جبل عامل: قلاعه ومدارسه وجسوره ومروجه ومطاحنه وجباله ومشاهده (in Arabic). مؤسسة الدائرة،
- IslamKotob. معجم الأدباء من العصر الجاهلي حتى سنة 2002 - ج 5 - ك - محمد علي جماز (in Arabic).
- Ajami, Fouad (2012-05-03). The Vanished Imam: Musa al Sadr and the Shia of Lebanon. Cornell University Press. ISBN 978-0-8014-6507-9.
- كوثراني, وجيه; السياسات, المركز العربي للأبحاث ودراسة (2014-01-01). إشكالية الدولة والطائفة والمنهج في كتابات تاريخية لبنانية: من لبنان الملجأ إلى بيوت العنكبوت (in Arabic). المركز العربي للأبحاث ودراسة السياسات. ISBN 978-9953-0-2931-3.
- دليل جنوب لبنان كتابا - المجلس الثقافي للبنان الجنوبي - الرقم 341
- El-Zein, Abbas (2009) Leave to Remain, A Memoir, first published by University of Queensland Press, 2009, 304 pages ISBN 9780702236921; republished by Untapped in 2022.
- حوار الأيام (in Arabic). Al Manhal. 2014-01-01. ISBN 9796500276519.
- Mazraʻānī, ʻAlī Ḥusayn; حسين, مزرعاني، علي (2002). قضاء النبطية في قرن ١٩٠٠-٢٠٠٠ (in Arabic). ع.‌ح. مزرعاني،.
- كتاب "عبد المجيد الزين" - لا ناشر - إعداد وإصدار رابطة آل الزين
- محسن, ضاهر، عدنان (2007). المجعم النيابي اللبناني: سيرة وتراجم اعضاء المجالس النيابية واعضاء مجالس الادارة في متصرفية جبل لبنان، 1861-2006 (in Arabic). ع. ضاهر ور. غنام،. ISBN 978-9953-0-0828-8.
- الشيخ أحمد رضا - حوادث جبل عامل - تحقيق منذر جابر.
- سليمان, ظاهر، (2006). معجم قرى جبل عامل (in Arabic). مؤسسة الإمام الصادق للبحوث في تراث علماء جبل عامل
- طرائف نبطانية (in Arabic). 2009.
- مذكرات جبل عامل - الشيخ أحمد رضا - إصدار دار النهار (in Arabic).
- Zakhyā, Zakhyā Mīshāl (1972). Hayātunā al-barlamānīyah min khilāl niṣf qarn (in Arabic).
- حمدان, طليع كمال (2017-01-01). تطور البنية المجتمعية في الجنوب اللبناني بين 1943 - 1975 (in Arabic). Al Manhal. ISBN 9796500279008.
- كتاب تكملة أمل الآمل للسيد حسن الصدر - ترجمة رقم 332
- عبد الله الخاقاني (2000). موسوعة النجف الأشرف؛شعراء النجف في القرن الرابع عشر. بيروت، لبنان: دار الأضواء. ج. المجلد التاسع عشر.
- السيد, فؤاد صالح (2015-01-01). أعظم الأحداث المعاصرة ( 1900 - 2014 م ) (in Arabic). Al Manhal. ISBN 9796500148564.
- الكرملى, انستاس مارى. لغة العرب - السنة الثالثة (in Arabic). ktab INC.
- Humayid, Ayoub (1986), "Sheikh Ahmed Aref El-Zein, Founder of Al-Irfan", Al-Irfan.
- Dagher, C. (2002-01-04). Bring Down the Walls: Lebanon's Post-War Challenge. Springer. ISBN 978-0-230-10919-3.
- Nahhas, Raghda (1996). The Reformist Sheikh from Jabal Amil (Masters of Arts thesis). American University of Beirut.
