= Rabi' al-Abrar =

Classic books written about Islam

Rabi al-Abrar wa nusus al-Akhbar (Arabic: ربيع الأبرار و نصوص الأخبار) are classical books written about Islam by Mu'tazili Islamic Scholar Zamakhshari.

Other transliterations include "Rabi ul-Abrar", "Rabi' al-Abrar", "Rabi-ul-Abrar", "Rabi'ul Abrar" and "Rabi' ul Abrar".

== Impact ==
It has been used as a reference by books such as Peshawar Nights and scholars like Badruddin Shibli (died 769 A.H.)

== Translations ==
An abridged English translation of this five volume work was published in a single volume in 2023. Selections from the Spring Garden of the Virtuous is the title of the translation and the translator has made it available as an open-access text through his website.
