= A Shi'i–Sunni dialogue =

Book by Abd al-Husayn Sharaf al-Din al-Musawi

A Shī‘ī–Sunnī Dialogue, also translated as The Right Path, is a book written by the Lebanese Shī‘ī cleric and religious authority ‘Abdul-Ḥusayn Sharaf ad-Dīn al-Mūsawī in Arabic as al-Murāja‘āt (Arabic: المراجعات), then it has been translated to more than ten languages including English.

According to the author, he visited Egypt on 1913, and met Salīm al-Bishrī, who was the head of al-Azhar University, and had long discussions with him regarding controversial issues between Shī‘īs and Sunnīs. The outcome of their discussions and long correspondence resulted in this book, which is highly recognized and circulated among Shī‘īs.

== Format ==
The book takes the form of a collection of a series of 112 written communications between ‘Abdul-Ḥusayn Sharaf ad-Dīn al-Mūsawī (signing with the first letter of his name 'Sh') and Salīm al-Bishrī (signing with the letter 'S') (the letters sh and s also possibly allude to the Shī‘ī–Sunnī nature of the dialogue).

== Criticism ==
The book has been thoroughly criticised by Sunnī Muslims such as in the books Al-Bayyināt fi-r-Raddi 'alā Abātīli-l-Murāja‘āt (2 volumes) by Mahmood Al-Zu'bee in Arabic and Shattering the Mirage: A Response to Abd al-Husayn Sharaf al-Din al-Musawi’s al-Murāwja‘āt in English which is still in progress.

== Editions ==
- It is translated from the Arabic by Yasin T. al-Jibouri and published in May 1994 by the Imam Husayn (as) Islamic Foundation, Beirut, Lebanon.
- Ansariyan Publications published it in 2001 then in 2005 then in 2008
- World Federation of KSI Muslim Communities

== See also ==
- Peshawar Nights
