= Abd al-Husayn Sharaf al-Din al-Musawi =

Islamic scholar

Al-Sayyid 'Abd al-Husayn al-Sharaf al-Din al-Musawi al-'Amili
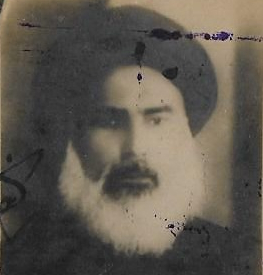
- Title: Sayyid, Allamah, Mujtahid

Personal life
- Born: 1872, Kadhimiya, Baghdad, Ottoman Iraq
- Died: 31 December 1957 Lebanon
- Resting place: Najaf, Iraq
- Era: Late modern period
- Region: Middle East
- Main interest(s): Kalam, Tafsir, Hadith, Ilm ar-Rijal, Usul, Fiqh, Dawah, Pan-Islamism
- Notable work(s): al-Muraja'at, Masa'il Fiqhiyya, al-Fusul al-Muhimah fi Ta'lif al-Ummah, Al-Nass wa l-ijtihad, Al-Kalimat al-gharra' fi tafdil al-Zahra, others

Religious life
- Religion: Islam
- Denomination: Shia Islam
- Jurisprudence: Twelver Ja'fari jurisprudence

Muslim leader
- Influenced by: Akhund Khorasani, Fath Allah Gharawi Isfahani, Mohammed Kazem Yazdi, Mirza Husain Noori Tabarsi

Ayatollah Al Sayyed Abd al-Husayn Sharaf al-Din al-Musawi, (Abdel Hussein Charafeddine, Sharafeddine, or Sharafeddin) (Arabic: آية اللّٰه السيد عبدالحسين شرف الدين الموسوي العاملي (المقدس)), was a Shi'a Twelver Islamic scholar who has widely been considered a social reformer, activist, and modern founder of the city of Tyre in Southern Lebanon. He was known for his nonviolent efforts against the French mandate in Lebanon, for which the French encouraged an unsuccessful assassination attempt against him.

== Biography ==
=== Family background ===
Born 1872 in Kadhimiya in the Ottoman Iraq to a Lebanese family of prominent religious scholars. His father al-Sayyid Yusuf Sharaf al-Din was from the village of Shuhur in Jebel Amel, the Shia area of what is now Southern Lebanon, and studied in Najaf, whilst his mother was Zahra Sadr, the daughter of Ayatollah al-Sayyid Hadi al-Sadr and the sister of al-Sayyid Hasan al-Sadr, the well-known Shiite scholar (author of the book Ta'sis al-Shi'a li 'ulum al-Islam) and the cousin of Sayyid Musa Sadr's grandfather. His family's lineage goes back to Ibrahim ibn Musa al-Kazim, the son of Imam Musa al-Kadhim.

=== Ottoman Iraq and Lebanon ===
When he was one year old, his father moved the family to Najaf in order to pursue Islamic studies. When he was 8 years old, the family returned to Lebanon. He married at age 17, and at the age of 20 went back to Iraq in order to study at clerical seminaries in Samarra and Najaf, where he stayed for twelve years until he became a mujtahid (independent reasoning in legal issues) at the age of 32.

"His religious studies were not confined to Shi'ism but also included Zaidism and Sunnism."

He then returned to Lebanon and first based himself in his father's home village of Shuhur and then in Tyre/Sour where he became known locally known in short time. There he founded a religious community centre. Later, the highest ranking religious authority in Lebanon, Sayyid 'Ali al-Amin, authorized (Arabic: Ijazah) him to issue fatawa (juridical rulings). In 1908 (1326 AH), Sayed Sharafeddin played a decisive role in the power struggle which was triggered by the 1908 Young Turk Revolution and its call for elections to an Ottoman parliament. In Jabal Amel the political wrestling took place between Rida al-Sulh of a Sunni dynasty from Sidon and Kamil Al-As'ad from the Shiite dynasty of Ali al-Saghir on the other side. The former had sidelined the Al-As'ad clan in the coastal region with support from leading Shiite families like the al-Khalil clan in Tyre, whereas the latter still dominated the hinterland. Sharafeddin tipped the balance in favour of the Al-Asa'ads.

"He achieved his prominent position in the community through his reputation as a widely respected 'alim [religious scholar] whose books were taught in prominent Shi'ite schools such as Najaf in Iraq and Qum in Iran."

In addition to his engagement in social work in Sur and Jabal 'Amil, Sayyid Sharaf al-Din continued his efforts writing and publishing. In 1910 (1327 AH), he published Issues important for uniting the Ummah (al-Fusul al-Muhimah fi Ta'lif al-Ummah).

In 1913 (1331 AH), he had the opportunity to implement his views on Muslim unity. He visited Egypt and met Shaykh Salim al-Bishri, the head of al-Azhar Mosque. The outcome of their discussions and long correspondence was the book al-Muraja'at. The book includes 112 correspondences between Sharaf al-Din and the Mufti of al-Azhar University, al-Shaykh Salim al-Bishri. The correspondences are concerned with the issue of caliphate and Imamate from a Shiite viewpoint; Sunni and Shiite arguments are examined and criticized in this book by appeals to verses of the Quran and reliable sources of Sunni hadiths.

One of the steps he took to unite the Muslim ummah was choosing the 12th of Rabi' al-Awal to celebrate the birthday of Muhammad rather than 17th of Rabi' al-Awal.

He deliberately chose this date because it was the one recognized by the Sunni Muslims, and he wished to bring all the Muslims, Shi'is and Sunnis, closer to each other. After observing this event in his mosque, Sayyid Sharaf al-Din would go the Sunnis to celebrate the occasion with them.

=== Pan-Arab Kingdom of Syria - French-British OETA (1918–1920) ===
After the collapse of the Ottoman Empire at the end of the First World War and the declaration of Arab Kingdom of Syria under Faisal I following the conquest of the Levant by the Sharifian Army with support from the British Empire, Sharafeddin became the leading prominent supporter of unity within a Greater Syria and organiser of nonviolent resistance against the French ambitions in Jabil Amil. In early 1920 (1338 A.H.), Sharafeddin led a Shia delegation to Damascus to make the case for unity with Syria.

When the King-Crane Commission of the United States government visited the region in 1337 A.H. (1919), Sharafeddin demanded US-support for a united Syria with Faisal as king:

"This angered the French who apparently encouraged an unsuccessful attempt to assassinate Sharaf al-Din."

In April 1920, he organized the Wadi al-Hujeir conference, declaring opposition to French rule and loyalty to Faisal. The pan-Arabist rule ended already after less than two years and France proclaimed the new State of Greater Lebanon under French colonial mandate. Sharafeddin was forced to flee:

"His home in Tyre was looted by French soldiers, his books and manuscripts were confiscated, another home in a neighboring village was burned. He fled to Damascus, but had to quit that city for Egypt and then for a brief stay several months in Palestine".

=== French Mandate colonial rule (1920–1943) ===
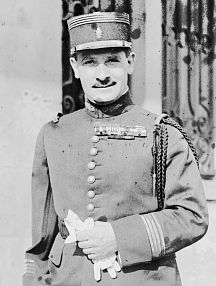
Russian-born Zinovi Pechkoff, who had been a protege of writer Maxim Gorky, photographed in 1926

On the first of September 1920, the French colonial rulers proclaimed the new State of Greater Lebanon under the guardianship of the League of Nations represented by France. The French High Commissioner in Syria and Lebanon became General Henri Gouraud. Tyre and the Jabal Amel were attached as the Southern part of the Mandate. When Gouraoud invited Sayed Sharafeddin back, he returned to Tyre in June 1921. Subsequently, Sharafeddin reached "rapprochement" with the colonial regime and even entertained friendly relations with the military governor of South Lebanon, Zinovi Pechkoff, whom he would regularly invite as guest of honour to religious events in Tyre.

Thus, Sharafeddin soon resurged as the most defining character for the development of modern Tyre, first as head of the municipal council until 1926 (1344 A.H.).

During the hajj rituals of 1340 A.H. (1922), Sharaf al-Din was invited by Malik Husayn, the king of Arabia, to lead the congregational prayers in Masjid al-Haram in which Shiite and Sunni Muslims attended.

In 1346 A.H. (1928), the first Shi'a mosque in Tyre was constructed, using local traditional architecture and centered around two Roman granite columns. It was named Abdel Hussein Mosque after Sharafeddine.

In late 1355 A.H. (1937), he went to Iraq to visit the holy shrines there, and in 1356 A.H. (1937–38) he went to Iran to visit the holy shrines in Qom and Mashhad as well as the Islamic Seminary of Qom.

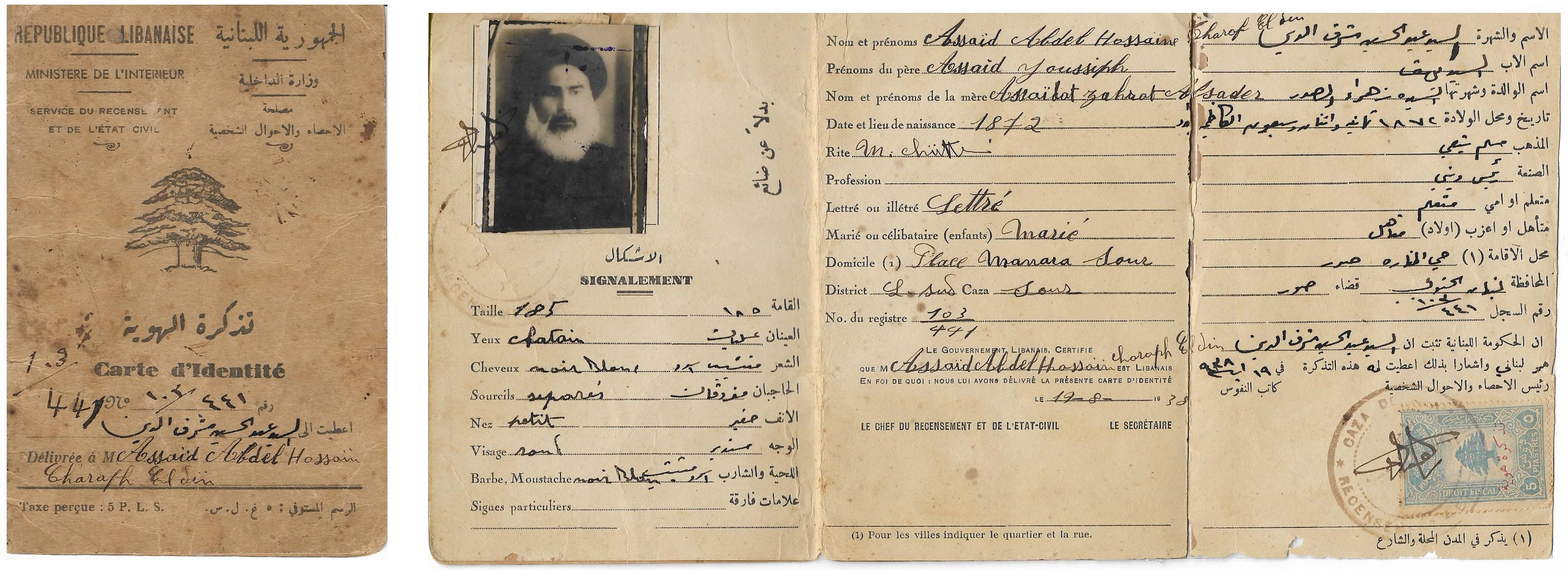
Sharafeddin's 1938 passport.

In the same year Sharafeddine founded a school for girls, the first primary school in South Lebanon altogether. It soon expanded, not least thanks to donations from merchants who had emigrated from Tyre to Western Africa and made their fortunes there. And it soon "became a nucleus for political activity in Tyre in particular and Jabal 'Amil as a whole".

In 1365 A.H. (1946), he founded a charity institute to help people in need, and in the last years of his life, he wrote the book, al-Nass wa l-ijtihad.

Sharaf al-Din died in 1957 in Lebanon. He is buried near the Imam Ali Mosque in Najaf.

Shortly before his death, Sharafeddine nominated Sayyid Musa Sadr as his successor.

== Legacy ==
=== Works ===
- Issues important for uniting the Ummah (al-Fusul al-Muhimah fi Ta'lif al-Ummah), a book which emphasized the necessity to unite the Muslims. In this text, he addressed the disputes and differences between the Shi'is and the Sunnis.

الفصول المهمة في تأليف الأمة

- A Shi'i-Sunni dialogue (al-Muraja'at)

المراجعات

- Questions on Jurisprudence (Masa'il Fiqhiyya)

مسائل فقهية

- Al-Nass wa l-ijtihad

...and others. النص و الإجتهاد

- Abo Huraira; a study about a man of hadeeth

ابو هريرة

- The Truthful Word in Preference of the Zahraa (pbuh) (Al kalima Al gharra' Fi Tafdeel Al zahraa (pbuh))

== See also ==
- List of Islamic scholars
- Hibatuddin Hosseini Shahrestani

The official website: https://imamsharafeddine.org/
