= Kfar Reman =

Kfar Reman كفررمان Kfar Roummâne
- Municipality
- Location in Lebanon
- Coordinates: 33°23′10.2″N 35°29′47.8″E
- Grid position: 127/161 L
- Country: Lebanon
- Governorate: Nabatieh Governorate
- District: Nabatieh District

Area
  - Total: 5.444 sq mi (14.10 km^{2})
- Elevation: 1,480 ft (450 m)
- Time zone: UTC+2 (EET)
  - Summer (DST): +3

Kfar Reman or Kfarreman (Arabic: كفررمان, romanized: Kfarremān) is a municipality in the Nabatieh Governorate region of southern Lebanon; located north east of Nabatieh.

== History ==
=== Byzantine era ===
When the Ottomans arrived to the village they noticed that the mosque was built with ancient material and found that the population had vineyards and tools from the byzantine empire.

=== Ottoman era ===
In the 1596 tax records, named Kfar Rumana, it was a village in the Ottoman nahiya (subdistrict) of Sagif under the liwa' (district) of Safad, with a population of 83 households and 1 bachelor, all Muslim. The villagers taxes on goats and bee hives, occasional revenues, a press for olive oil or grape syrup, in addition to a fixed sum; a total of 4,094 akçe.

In 1875, Victor Guérin found the village to have 180 Metuali inhabitants. The village had a mosque constructed with ancient materials.

Historically, it has been the hometown of some members of the El Zein family, such as Ismail El Zein, Youssef El Zein, Sheikh Muhammad Rida El Zein and their descendants.

=== Modern era ===
Historically known as a prominent stronghold of the Lebanese Communist Party (LCP), earned the moniker "Kfar Moscow" (Village of Moscow) during the mid-20th century. The town's shift toward left-wing politics accelerated during the 1950s and 1960s, driven by local labor movements, agricultural mobilization among tobacco farmers, and cross-sectarian secular organizing. By the onset of the Lebanese Civil War in 1975, Kfar Roummane had established itself as a major hub for communist intellectual and militant activity in southern Lebanon. During the subsequent Israeli occupation of the region, the town served as a primary logistical and operational base for the Lebanese National Resistance Front (LNRF), a communist-led coalition founded in 1982.

On 2 November 1991 units of the South Lebanon Army (SLA) toured the villages with loudspeakers ordering villagers including a Lebanese Army unit to leave immediately in the name of the Israeli Army (IDF). In the context of eight days of continuous shelling of the Nabatieh area by the SLA and IDF many of the villagers fled, only returning after American intervention.

In the context of the 2026 Lebanon war, an Israeli airstrike led to two fatalities in late March.

On 7 September 2026, an Israeli airstrike destroyed a three-storey residential building in Kfar Roummane, killing 12 members of the Farhat family: three men, three women and six children aged between two months and 13 years. A separate Israeli strike in the town killed an 18-year-old paramedic. The attacks occurred despite a ceasefire agreed in June that was intended to halt fighting between Israel and Hezbollah.

== Demographics ==
In 2014 Muslims made up 99.20% of registered voters in Kfar Reman. 97.04% of the voters were Shiite Muslims.

== Bibliography ==
- Guérin, V. (1880). Description Géographique Historique et Archéologique de la Palestine (in French). Vol. 3: Galilee, pt. 2. Paris: L'Imprimerie Nationale.
- Hütteroth, W.-D.; Abdulfattah, K. (1977). Historical Geography of Palestine, Transjordan and Southern Syria in the Late 16th Century. Erlanger Geographische Arbeiten, Sonderband 5. Erlangen, Germany: Vorstand der Fränkischen Geographischen Gesellschaft. ISBN 3-920405-41-2.
- Rhode, H. (1979). Administration and Population of the Sancak of Safed in the Sixteenth Century (PhD). Columbia University. Archived from the original on 2020-03-01.
