= Sultan al-Wa'izin Shirazi =

Iranian Ayatollah (1894–1971)

Ayatollah Sultan al-Wa'izin Shirazi
- سلطان الواعظین شیرازی
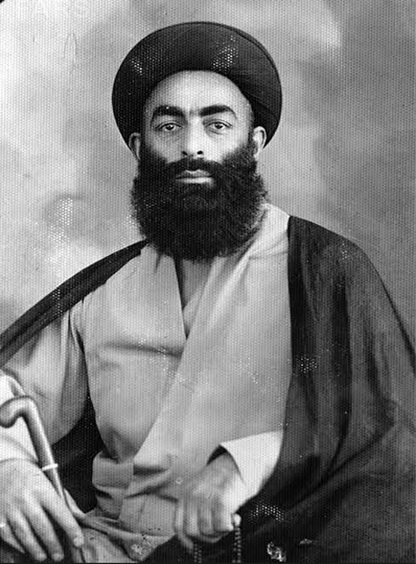

Personal life
- Born: Seyed Mohammad Shirazi; 12 May 1894 Tehran, Sublime State of Persia
- Died: 11 October 1971 (aged 77) Tehran, Imperial State of Iran
- Resting place: Fatima Masumeh Shrine, Qom
- Notable work(s): Peshawar Nights (شب‌های پیشاور); A Hundred Sultani Articles (صد مقاله سلطانی); The Liberated Group (گروه رستگاران)

Religious life
- Religion: Islam
- School: Twelver Shia Islam

Seyed Mohammad Shirazi (12 May 1894 – 11 October 1971), commonly known as Sultan al-Wa'izin Shirazi ("Prince of Preachers from Shiraz"), was a prominent Shi'a scholar. He authored Peshawar Nights, an account of a public debate between Shi'a and Sunni Muslims which took place in Peshawar over 10 nights beginning on 27 January 1927

Sultanu l-Wa'izin Shirazi was born in Tehran on 12 May 1894. After his primary school in Tehran, he moved with his father to Karbala and studied in some Hawzas.

== Overview ==
According to the book, he participated in a public debate between Shi'a Muslims and Sunni Muslims. The debate is said to have taken place in Peshawar (now in Pakistan, which at the time was part of British India) beginning on 27 January 1924. The Shi'a were victorious in debate. According to the preface:

A condition of the dialogue was that only sources acceptable to both sects would be cited. The dialogue was held in Persian, commonly understood in the city of Peshawar where some of his descendants reside. The transcript, made by four reporters and published in the newspapers daily, was published in book form in Teheran and soon became a classic authority in the East. The present work is based on the fourth edition, published in Teheran in 1971, the year in which Sultan al-Wa'izin died at the age of 75.

== See also ==
- List of Islamic scholars
