= Peshawar Nights =

Book by Sultan-ul-Wâ'idhîn Shîrâzî

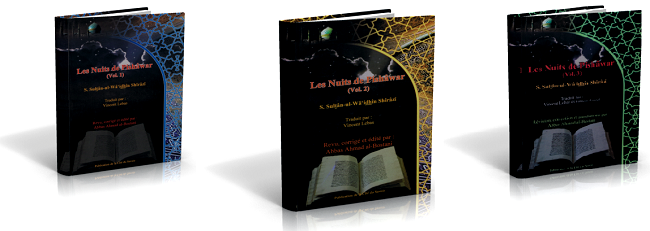
- Author: Sultan al-Wa'izin Shirazi
- Original title: شب‌های پیشاور
- Language: en
- Subject: Shia-Sunni debate
- Genre: Polemic
- Published: 1st ed. 1977
- Publication place: Iran

Peshawar Nights (شبهای پیشاور در دفاع از حریم تشیع Shab-hā-ye Pishāwar) is a written firsthand account by Sultan al-Wa'izin Shirazi ("Prince of Preachers from Shiraz"), recalling ten days of dialogues between two Sunni scholars and a Shia author about major topics relating to Shia Islam, which took place in Peshawar (now in Pakistan, which, at the time, was part of British India) beginning on 27 January 1927. The book was originally written in Persian and published in Tehran and has subsequently been translated into several languages, the first English edition was published in 1977 in Pakistan.

== Background ==
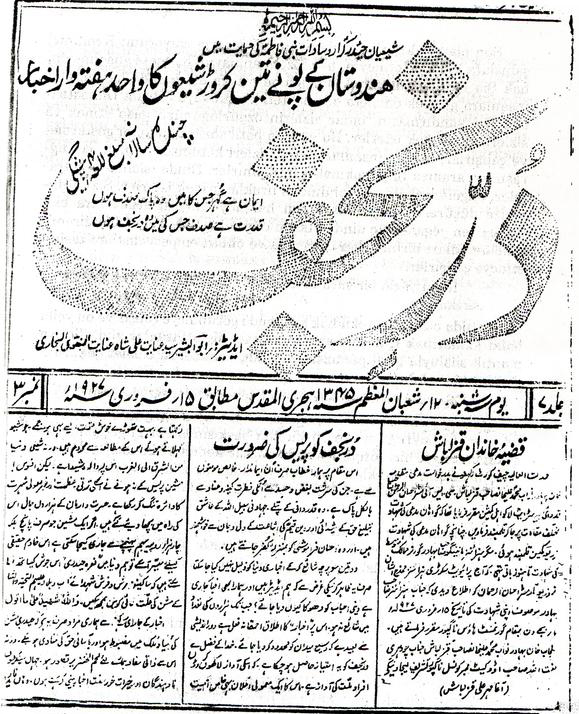
1st page

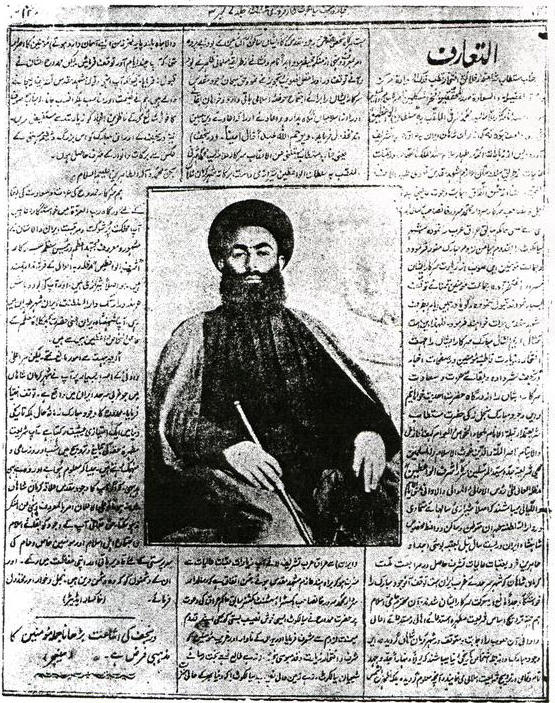
2nd page

An article about the debate in "Durre Najaf" magazine.

It recounts a public debate between Shia Muslims and Sunni Muslims, that took place in the city of Peshawar in the North-West Frontier Province of British India (present-day Khyber Pakhtunkhwa, Pakistan) for ten nights beginning on 27 January 1927. The two principal participants from the Sunni side were Hafiz Muhammad Rashid and Sheikh Abdus Salam from Kabul. The discussions were attended by approximately 200 people (Shia and Sunni Muslims) and were recorded by four reporters published following morning in the local newspapers. According to the preface:

A condition of the dialogue was that only sources acceptable to both sects would be cited. The dialogue was held in Persian, commonly understood in the city of Peshawar (Note: Persian is no longer commonly understood in Peshawar). The transcript, made by four reporters and published in the newspapers daily, was published in book form in Teheran and soon became a classic authority in the East. The present work is based on the fourth edition, published in Teheran in 1971, the year in which Sultan al-Wa'izin died at the age of 75.

== English editions ==
The title of the book is a translation of the original Persian title, Shabhaye-Peshawar. Since its first translation, printing & publishing in English, it been re-translated, re-printed & re-published across the world several times. A few of the major English publications available are:

- A digest by Peermahomed Ebrahim Trust, Pakistan from the 1970s
- A translation by Hamid Quinlan and Charles Ali Campbell, published by Ansariyan Publications, Iran, from the 1990s
- From the UK in the 2000s
- Multiple times in the 2010s:
  - In 2013, two parts; Part 1 & Part 2
  - In February 2014
  - In September 2014, two parts; Part 1 & Part 2
  - In July 2015, two parts; Part 1 & Part 2
  - In November 2015, two parts; Part 1 & Part 2
  - In 2017, two parts; Part 1 & Part 2
  - In 2018

== Translations in other languages ==
Apart from English, the book has been translated into several other languages from original Persian. It is available in:

- Persian (شب‌های پیشاور)
- English (Peshawar Nights)
- Urdu (شبہائے پشاور)
- Arabic (ليالي بيشاور)
- Azerbaijani (Pişəvər gecələri))
- French (Les Nuits de Pishawar)
- Spanish (Las Noches de Peshawar)
- Indonesian (Mazhab Syia, Mazhab Pecinta Keluarga Nabi: Kajian al-Quran dan Sunnah). In Indonesian, it was initially translated as Mazhab Syia and was reprinted in 2009 under the title Mazhab Pecinta Keluarga Nabi: Kajian al-Quran dan Sunnah.

== Book's coverage ==
The book is notable, it has not only been reprinted several times in English by different publishers across the world but also has been translated to several languages and has not only been cited by books but is also used as teaching/reference material in academia and suggested as reading material by others.

=== Citations and mentions ===
The book has been cited or mentioned by later books, journal, etc. including,

- as a reference in book 'The Twelver Shi'a as a Muslim Minority in India: Pulpit of Tears'
- as reference in footnotes in book 'The Suffering of the Ahl ul Bayt and their Followers (Shia) throughout History'
- as a reference in magazine 'The Light, Volumes 24-25'
- in bibliography in book 'Discourses of Mobilization in Post-revolutionary Iran'
- mentioned in text of book 'Shi'ism In South East Asia: Alid Piety and Sectarian Constructions'

=== Listings ===
- listed in "Accessions List, Pakistan, Volume 18, 1979"
- listed in "Forthcoming Books, Volume 35, Issue 5"

Peshawar Nights has been listed as one of the books "to understand Shia better", it is searchable and downloadable from internet free of charge.

=== Academia ===
The book has not only been catalogued by university libraries cited by books but also is used as teaching/reference material in academia and suggested as reading material,

- it is catalogued in 'The Online Books Page' of the library of University of Pennsylvania.
- it is mentioned as one of the 'contemporary material' suggested for use as teaching/reference material by University at Albany in its The Journal for Multi Media History.
- it is catalogued under 'The Shi'ite Tradition' in the 'Internet Islamic History Sourcebook' of the Fordham University

== See also ==
- A Shi'i-Sunni dialogue
