= Shehour =

Shehour شحور
- Municipality
- Nickname: Dar El Ezz (Arabic:دار العز)
- Location within Lebanon
- Coordinates: 33°18′N 35°22′E
- Grid position: 115/151 L
- Country: Lebanon
- Governorate: South Governorate
- District: Tyre

Area
  - Total: 7.8 km^{2} (3.0 sq mi)
- Elevation: 320 m (1,050 ft)

Population (7000)
  - Total: 1,375
  - Density: 180/km^{2} (460/sq mi)
- Time zone: +2
  - Summer (DST): +3
- Website: shohour.org (in Arabic)

Shehour, Shuhur, or Shhur (Arabic: شحور, romanized: Shuḥūr), is a municipality on the Litani River in the Tyre District of Southern Lebanon's South Governorate, some 95 kilometres to the south-west of Beirut, the capital city of Lebanon.

== Etymology ==
E. H. Palmer wrote that the name Shuhûr meant "mud walls", or "conspicuous part".

== History ==
=== Ottoman rule (1516-1918) ===
In 1596, it was named as a village, Ishur, in the Ottoman nahiya (subdistrict) of Tibnin under the liwa' (district) of Safad, with a population of 48 households, all Muslim. The villagers paid a fixed tax rate of 25% on agricultural products, such as wheat, barley, olive trees, goats and beehives, in addition to occasional revenues and a press for olive oil or grape syrup, and a water mill; a total of 3,067 akçe.

In 1710, Sayed Salih ibn Muhammad ibn Sharaf al-Din was born in Shehour. He went on to found a dynasty of Shiite scholars, who would play a key-role in the development of Jabal Amel (modern-day Southern Lebanon) up to today. However, Sayed Salih was persecuted during the campaigns of the Ottoman governor of Sidon, Ahmad Pasha al-Jazzar, who had the Shiite population decimated in brutal purges. One of Sayed Salih's sons was murdered and he himself imprisoned for nine years.

In the first half of the 19th century the Shiite notable Mahmoud Mazyad built a mill on the bank of the Litani River:

In 1881, the PEF's Survey of Western Palestine (SWP) described it as: "A large village with some good houses, containing about 600 Metawileh; it is situated on a hill, and has a well and cisterns in it. There are figs and olives around."

=== French Mandate colonial rule (1920–1943) ===
Soon after the French colonial rulers proclaimed the new State of Greater Lebanon under the guardianship of the League of Nations represented by France on the first of September 1920, French soldiers razed the village residence of Tyre's Imam Abd al-Husayn Sharaf al-Din al-Musawi in Shehour by setting fire to it.

== Demographics ==
In 2014 Muslims made up 99.43% of registered voters in Shehour. 97.87% of the voters were Shiite Muslims.

== Educational establishment ==
The table below provides a comparison of public and private schools locally and nationally. It can be used to assess the distribution of students between public and private institutions both locally and nationally. All data provided on education concerning the 2005–2006 school year. Since the publication of more recent figures we will strive to published online.

Educational establishments	Shehour (2005–2006)	Lebanon (2005–2006)
Number of Schools	2	2788
Public School	2	1763
Private School	Not available	1025
Students schooled in the public schools	Not available	439905
Students schooled in the private schools	Not available	471409

== Notable people ==
- al-Sayyid Yusuf Sharaf al-Din, father of Abd al-Husayn Sharaf al-Din al-Musawi
- Musa al-Sadr founder of the Amal Movement in Lebanon.

== Bibliography ==
- Conder, C.R.; Kitchener, H.H. (1881). The Survey of Western Palestine: Memoirs of the Topography, Orography, Hydrography, and Archaeology. Vol. 1. London: Committee of the Palestine Exploration Fund.
- Hütteroth, W.-D.; Abdulfattah, K. (1977). Historical Geography of Palestine, Transjordan and Southern Syria in the Late 16th Century. Erlanger Geographische Arbeiten, Sonderband 5. Erlangen, Germany: Vorstand der Fränkischen Geographischen Gesellschaft. ISBN 3-920405-41-2.
- Palmer, E.H. (1881). The Survey of Western Palestine: Arabic and English Name Lists Collected During the Survey by Lieutenants Conder and Kitchener, R. E. Transliterated and Explained by E.H. Palmer. Committee of the Palestine Exploration Fund.
- Rhode, H. (1979). Administration and Population of the Sancak of Safed in the Sixteenth Century. Columbia University. Archived from the original on 2019-04-20.
