= Abbas El-Zein =

Australian writer and academic (born 1963)

- ﻋﺒﺎﺲ اﻟﺰﻳﻦ
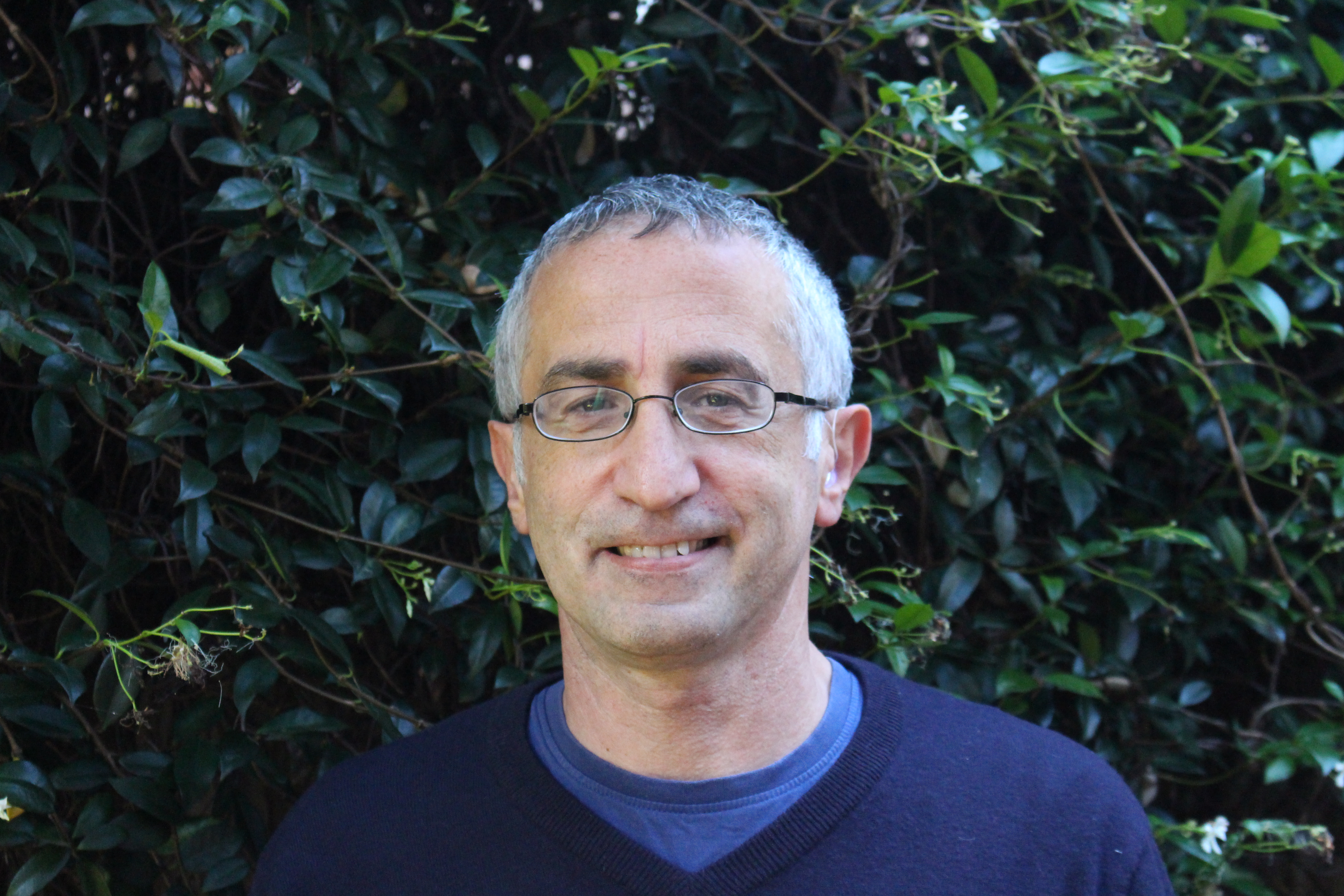
- Born: Beirut, Lebanon
- Education: American University of Beirut (BE), University of Southampton (MSc, PhD), Ecole Nationale des Ponts et Chaussées (DEA)
- Occupations: Writer and academic
- Writing career
- Notable awards: 2025 National Biography Award. 2024 Queensland Non-Fiction Book Award. 2010 New South Wales Premier Literary Award (Community Relations Commission Award).

Abbas El-Zein (Arabic: ﻋﺒﺎﺲ اﻟﺰﻳﻦ; born 1963) is an Australian writer and academic. He is the author of two acclaimed works of fiction – a novel, Tell the Running Water and a collection of short stories, The Secret Maker of the World – as well as an award-winning memoir, Leave to Remain, about growing up in civil-war Lebanon and migrating to Europe and Australia. His new book, Bullet, Paper Rock – A Memoir of Words and Wars was published on 3 April 2024 and won the 2025 National Biography Award, Australia's richest biography award, and the 2024 non-fiction book prize of the Queensland Literary Awards (the University of Queensland non-fiction Book Award). It was also shortlisted for the 2025 Douglas Stewart prize, the non-fiction category of the New South Wales literary awards.

El-Zein has published essays and articles on war, displacement and environmental decline. His work has appeared in The New York Times, The Guardian, The Age, The Sydney Morning Herald, as well as literary magazines Meanjin, Heat and Overland.

His writing is part of a body of work by a number of Anglo-Arab and Franco-Arab writers, first emerging in the 2000s, especially authors from a Lebanese background writing in English or French, post Lebanese civil war, in whose work themes of violence, loss, memory and identity are prominent. El-Zein has made numerous media appearances and, as a scholar, has authored and co-authored a large number of scientific papers on environmental sustainability, hydrology, sea level rise and development. He has lectured at the American University of Beirut and the University of New South Wales. He is professor of environmental engineering at the University of Sydney.

== Background ==
Abbas El-Zein was born and grew up in Beirut. He was twelve years of age when the Lebanese civil war broke out in 1975. He was educated at the bilingual French-Arabic school, Mission Laique Francaise. After graduating with a degree in civil engineering from the American University of Beirut in 1986, he left for the UK where he acquired Master's and PhD degrees in computational mechanics and mathematical modelling from the University of Southampton, and later, a Master's by research degree in environmental science from the Ecole Nationale des Ponts et Chaussées in Paris. He lived and worked in the UK and France for a number of years before moving to Australia in 1995. He started writing his first novel while living in the UK. In 1993, he participated in a writing workshop/retreat run by Beryl Bainbridge and Bernice Rubens at the Tŷ Newydd Writing Centre, Wales. Later, he published a number of essays in Meanjin and Heat and completed his first novel in 1998. In 2005, he won an Australia Council for the Arts grant for new work, which led to the writing of his memoir Leave to Remain in 2009.

== Awards and honours ==
- Australia Council for the Arts Grant – New Literary Work (2005)
- Leave to Remain, A Memoir: winner of New South Wales Premier Literary Award – Community Relations Commission Award (2010)
- Bullet Paper Rock – A Memoir of Words and Wars:
  - winner of the National Biography Award (2025)
  - winner of the University of Queensland Non-Fiction Book Award (2024)
  - shortlisted for the Douglas Steward Prize for non-fiction in the New South Wales literary awards (2025)

== Books ==
- Tell the Running Water, first published by Spectre, Hodder Headline, 2001, 248 pages, ISBN 0733613195; republished by Untapped in 2022.
- Leave to Remain, A Memoir, first published by University of Queensland Press, 2009, 304 pages ISBN 9780702236921; republished by Untapped in 2022.
- The Secret Maker of the World, University of Queensland Press, 2014, 192 pages, ISBN 9780702250071.
- Bullet, Paper, Rock – A Memoir of Words and Wars, Upswell Publishing, 2024, 224 pages, ISBN 978-0-6458745-3-2.
