= Dakhni Sarai =

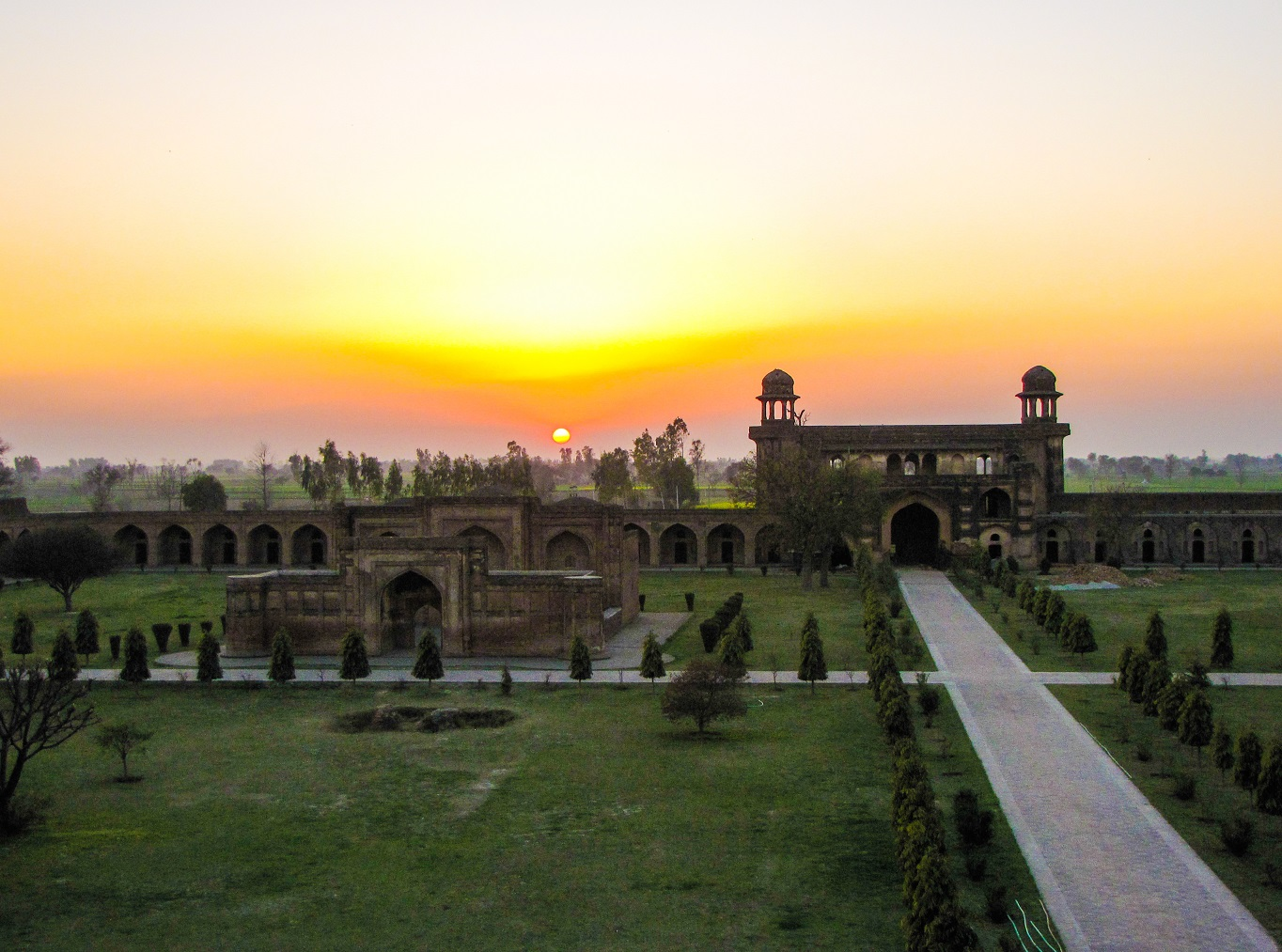
- The courtyard of the sarai. The western side and gateway is seen in the background.
- Interactive map of Dakhni Sarai
- Location: Mallian Kalan, Punjab, India
- Coordinates: 31°10′19″N 75°24′42″E
- Built: 1640
- Architectural style: Mughal architecture

Monument of National Importance
- Reference no.: N-PB-12

Dakhni Sarai, also known as Dakhini Sarai, is a caravanserai located on the outskirts of Mallian Kalan, in the Indian state of Punjab.

Located on the medieval route between Agra and Lahore, it was built in the 17th century. It is an example of Mughal architecture. It is in the form of a quadrangle, with large gateways on the eastern and western sides. A mosque is also located within the complex.

== Background ==
A caravanserai (or sarai) is a type of roadside inn, providing accommodation for travelers and caravans. During the reign of the Mughal empire, several sarais were built at regular intervals along the major highways of the empire. The Dakhni sarai is located on the medieval (now little-used) highway between Agra and Lahore.

Owing to the absence of a foundation inscription, the sarai is dated on the basis of its style. Its architectural features and designs resemble those of the Wazir Khan Mosque, suggesting that it may have been constructed around the same time, in the 1630s, and possibly commissioned by the same patron, that is, Wazir Khan. Other sources mention it having been built by Ali Mardan Khan, in 1640.

In 1870, a leper colony was established at the sarai, and it had a capacity of 300 patients.

== Description ==
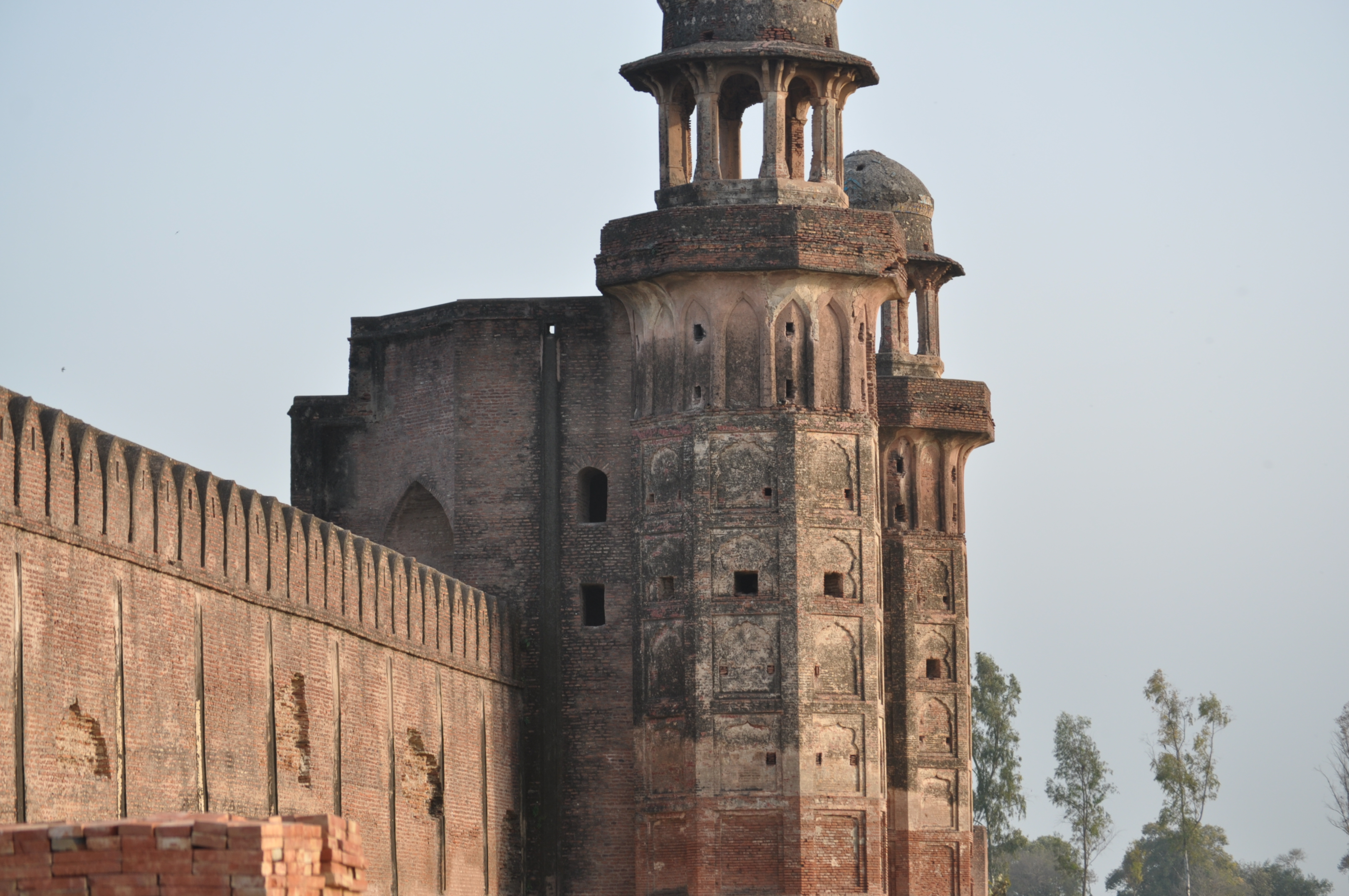
The western gateway. Each gateway is flanked by octagonal bastions which contain five levels of recessed panels, and is topped with a chhatri.

It is located on the highway between Agra and Lahore, and was intended to provide shelters to travelers along the route. The sarai is in the form of a quadrangle, with dimensions of 180 × 172 meters. It consists of a courtyard, surrounded by thirty rooms on each side. Each room is 3.8 meters long and 3.3 meters wide. An additional, larger room is located at the center of both the northern and southern sides, while large gateways are provided at the center of the eastern and western sides.

Each gateway features a central arch that serves as the entrance, flanked on both sides by smaller recessed arches. Above these, two stories of triple openings with projecting balconies are present. The openings of the middle story were adorned with jali screens, traces of which survive on the eastern gateway. At either end of each gateway, octagonal bastions are provided. Each of the bastions contain recessed panels arranged in five levels, and is topped with a chhatri.

Towards the southwest is a mosque, which is surrounded by a wall. The mosque is crowned with three domes, and its façade is flanked by two minarets. It measures 21.5 × 16 meters. To the east of the mosque are some ruins, presumably of a hammam.
