= Mohammad Nawaz =

Mohammad or Muhammad Nawaz may refer to:

- Mohammad Nawaz (cricketer, born 1970), Pakistani first-class cricketer for Faisalabad and Sargodha
- Mohammad Nawaz (cricketer, born 1974), Pakistani first-class cricketer for Faisalabad and Hyderabad
- Mohammad Nawaz (cricketer), Pakistani cricketer (born 1994)
- Mohammad Nawaz Sharif, Pakistani politician and three times elected Prime Minister
- Muhammad Nawaz, Pakistani javelin thrower
- Muhammad Nawaz (general) (1957–2011), Pakistani general
- Muhammad Nawaz Bhatti (1948–2006), Pakistani judge
- Muhammad Nawaz Khan (politician), Pakistani politician
- Muhammad Nawaz Khan (writer) (1943–2015), Pakistani writer
- Muhammad Nawaz Abbasi (born 1943), former Pakistani judge
- Mohammad Nawaz (footballer) (born 2000), Indian football goalkeeper
