= Chiniot =

City in Punjab, Pakistan

Chiniot چنیوٹ (Punjabi)
- City
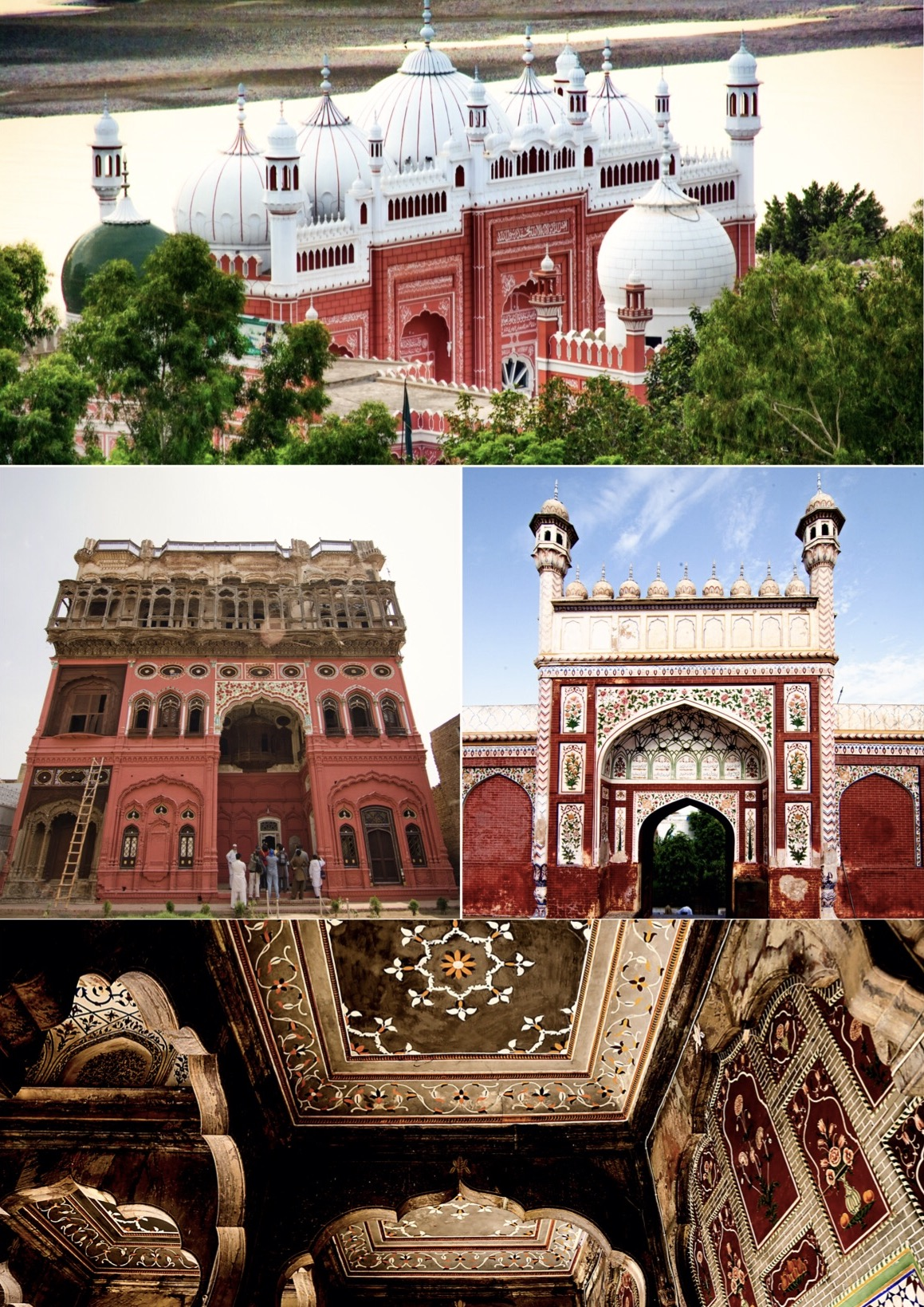
- Clockwise from top: Bu Ali Qalandar Mosque besides Chenab River, exterior and interior views of Shahi Mosque, Omar Hayat Mahal

- Municipal Committee logo

- Location of Chiniot in Pakistan Chiniot (Pakistan)
- Coordinates: 31°43′10″N 72°59′3″E
- Country: Pakistan
- Province: (Punjab, Pakistan) Punjab
- Division: Faisalabad
- District: Chiniot

Government
  - Type: Municipal Committee
  - Chairman: None (vacant)
  - Vice Chairman: None (vacant)
- Elevation: 179 m (587 ft)

Population (2023 census)
  - City: 318,165
  - Rank: 30th, Pakistan; 49th (Agglomeration)
  - Urban: 357,181
- Time zone: UTC+5 (PST)
  - Summer (DST): UTC+6 (PDT)
- Postal code: 35400
- Dialling code: 047
- Distance(s): From: • Lahore – 161 km; • Faisalabad – 38 km; • Islamabad – 283 km; • Karachi – 1,175 km; • Peshawar – 414 km; • Quetta – 871 km; • Multan – 246 km; • Muzaffarabad – 439 km; • Gilgit – 755 km
- Website: www.mcchiniot.lgpunjab.org.pk/Administrative-Setup.html

Chiniot (Punjabi / Urdu: چنیوٹ; Punjabi: [t͡ʃɐ.nĕ.joːʈᵊ]; Urdu: [ˈt͡ʃɪ.ni.joːʈ]) is a city and the administrative headquarters of Chiniot District in the province of Punjab, Pakistan. Located on the bank of the river Chenab, it is the 28th most populous city in the country.

Chiniot is known for its intricate wooden furniture, architecture, and mosques. The Shahi Mosque, Omar Hayat Haveli, Laxmi Narayan temple and the shrines of Shah Burhan and Saeen Sukh are some of the notable specimen of Chinioti architecture in the town.

== History ==
=== Early ===
The origins of Chiniot are obscure, and historical records detailing its foundation are unavailable. According to some accounts, the city was founded by an ancient princess named Chandan, who while on a hunting expedition, was charmed by the surrounding area, and ordered the construction of the settlement of Chandaniot, alternatively spelt Chandniot, named in her honour. The name Chiniot, a contracted form of the original name, eventually gained favour, though the older name had been in use until at least the 1860s.

=== Mughal ===
During the Mughal rule, Chiniot was governed as part of the subah, or province, of Lahore. The city reached its zenith during the reign of Mughal emperor Shah Jahan, under his governor of Punjab, Wazir Khan and his grand vizier, Sa'adullah Khan Chinioti, both of whom hailed from the town and constructed a number of public works in Chiniot. A son of Chinioti, Hifzullah Khan, who also served as faujdar of Chiniot, commissioned the Shahi Mosque. Chinioti artisans were renowned for their skill, and were employed in the decoration of the Taj Mahal, and the Wazir Khan Mosque in Lahore.

=== Mughal decline and Sial rule ===
Following the collapse of Mughal authority after the death of emperor Aurangzeb in 1707, the local Sial dynasty under the rule of Walidad Khan was officially granted governorship of the area. Though nominally a part of the declining Mughal realm, Walidad Khan forged a largely independent state in western Punjab that controlled the region between Mankera and Kamalia. Chiniot suffered heavily during the Durrani invasion of the late 1748.

=== Sikh ===
The Sial state around Chiniot was encroached upon by Sikh chieftains in the north, and by Multani chiefs in the south, before coming under the control of the Sikh Bhangi Misl by 1765. The Sikhs imposed an annual tribute on the Sial chief, Inayatullah Khan Sial, which he ceased paying in 1778 before also capturing Chiniot. He died in 1787, though the city had reverted to Bhangi Sikh rule before his death.

The city suffered during the Sikh Misls' period in which the region's Bhangis battled the Sukerchakia Misl. Chiniot was captured by Ranjit Singh in 1803, and thereafter became part of the Sikh Empire. The city was invested in Sial chief Ahmad Khan, who promised to pay tribute to Ranjit Singh's kingdom. Khan stopped paying tribute, and briefly seized full control of the region in 1808, but was decisively defeated by Ranjit Singh's forces in 1810.

=== British ===
The city came under British rule by 1849, and the city was constituted as a municipality in 1862. In 1875, the city's population was 11,999. During the British period, a vast network of canals was laid to irrigate Punjab, resulting in the creation of many new "canal colonies" around Chiniot. Chiniot's famous Omar Hayat Mahal was built between 1923 and 1935 for a businessman who made his fortune in Calcutta.

== Geography ==
=== Location ===
Chiniot is at the intersection of the Faisalabad–Sargodha and Lahore–Jhang roads. It is 158 km (98 mi) northwest of Lahore and 38 km (24 mi) north of Faisalabad. Chiniot city is spread over an area of 10 km^{2} (3.9 sq mi) with an average elevation of 179 metres (587 ft).

Rabwah city, the headquarters of the Ahmadiyya Community is on the other side of the Chenab River. In the center of river a worship center (or Chilla Gah) of the Sufi Bu Ali Shah Qalandar is located.

=== Topography ===
Chiniot city lies on left bank of the Chenab River, and is located on a small rocky hill. Much of the surrounding area consists of alluvial plains, interspersed with rocky outcroppings of slate and sandstone that reach up to 400 feet in height around Chiniot.

== Climate ==
Chiniot has a hot semi-arid climate (Köppen climate classification BSh). The weather in Chiniot is variable.

Climate data for Chiniot (1961-1990)
| Month | Jan | Feb | Mar | Apr | May | Jun | Jul | Aug | Sep | Oct | Nov | Dec | Year |
|---|---|---|---|---|---|---|---|---|---|---|---|---|---|
| Mean daily maximum °C (°F) | 19 (66) | 22 (72) | 27 (81) | 33 (91) | 39 (102) | 39 (102) | 35 (95) | 35 (95) | 34 (93) | 32 (90) | 27 (81) | 21 (70) | 30 (87) |
| Mean daily minimum °C (°F) | 8 (46) | 11 (52) | 16 (61) | 20 (68) | 25 (77) | 28 (82) | 27 (81) | 27 (81) | 25 (77) | 20 (68) | 14 (57) | 9 (48) | 19 (67) |
| Average rainfall mm (inches) | 18 (0.7) | 35 (1.4) | 24 (0.9) | 13 (0.5) | 17 (0.7) | 69 (2.7) | 139 (5.5) | 113 (4.4) | 56 (2.2) | 9 (0.4) | 11 (0.4) | 12 (0.5) | 516 (20.3) |
Source: My Weather

== Demographics ==
Population

Historical population

| Year | Pop. | ±% p.a. |
|---|---|---|
| 1951 | 39,042 | — |
| 1961 | 47,099 | +1.89% |
| 1972 | 70,108 | +3.68% |
| 1981 | 105,559 | +4.65% |

| Year | Pop. | ±% p.a. |
|---|---|---|
| 1998 | 172,522 | +2.93% |
| 2017 | 278,747 | +2.56% |
| 2023 | 318,165 | +2.23% |

According to the 1998 census, the population of Chiniot Tehsil was 965,124 (included urban 172,522). According to the 2023 Census of Pakistan, the city has the population of 318,165.

=== Languages ===
Urban Demography in Chiniot Tehsil (2023)
1. Punjabi (88.9%)
2. Urdu (9.45%)
3. Pashto (1.43%)
4. Other (0.19%)

According to the 2023 Census of Pakistan, Chiniot City has an overwhelmingly Punjabi-speaking population, with Punjabi spoken by 88.93% of residents. Urdu is the second most common first language at 9.45%, Pashto third with 1.43%, and an additional combined 0.19% of people spoke other languages of Pakistan.

== Economy ==
The important products of Chiniot includes silk, cotton, wheat, sugar, rice, milk, pottery, wooden furniture, etc. The city's agricultural economy is largely derived from "canal colonies" established during British rule when a vast network of canals were laid to irrigate Punjab.

Chiniot is famous for his wooden furniture, and developed as a centre of woodworking given its close proximity to the Chenab River – as timber from Kashmir would be floated down the river towards Chiniot. Chiniot's artisans are renowned for their skill, and were employed in the construction of the Taj Mahal and Wazir Khan Mosque. The city's metalworkers, along with those of Lahore, were considered the best in Punjab during the British period, and Chinioti designs and were considered superior to those of Hoshiarpur or Jalandhar. Ramzan Sugar Mills is located at Faisalabad Road.

== Education ==
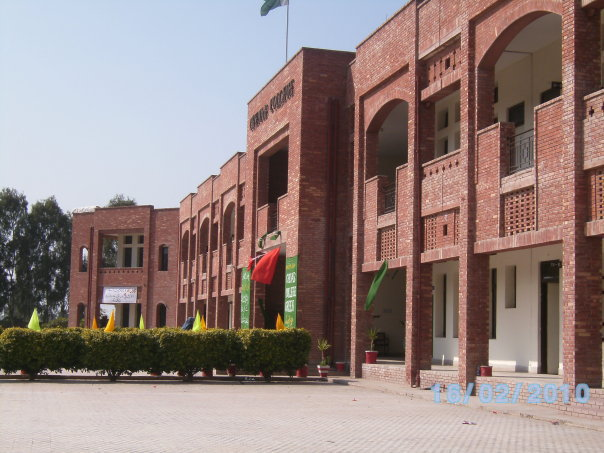
A side view of the building of Chenab College Chiniot

Educational institutions in Chiniot include

- Unified Law College, Chiniot (ULC)
- Allama Iqbal Model School, Chiniot
- Chenab College, Chiniot
- Govt Al Islah High School, Chiniot
- Govt High School Inayatpur, Chiniot
- Govt High School Salara, Chiniot
- Govt Islamia College, Chiniot
- Govt Islamia High School, Chiniot
- Govt Primary School, Shareen Awan Chiniot
- Govt Mudrassa-tul-Banat High School, Chiniot
- Superior Group of Colleges Chiniot Campus
- Khatam e Nabuwat Institute of Modern Sciences (KIMS) College, Chiniot
- Masoomeen Foundation High School, Chiniot
- Masoomeen School and College, Chiniot
- National University of Computer and Emerging Sciences (NUCES)
- Punjab College, Chiniot
- Superior Group of Colleges Chiniot Campus
- Tips College, Chiniot
- Unified P/G Science College, Chiniot

=== Libraries ===
After his death, Sheikh Omar Hayat's Haveli Omar Hayat Mahal was converted into a library by the Government of Pakistan.

== Transport and communication ==
Chiniot is connected with the rest of Pakistan by a main highway and rail line. The nearest international airport is Faisalabad International Airport, which is 48.5 km (30.1 mi) from Chiniot.

== Culture ==
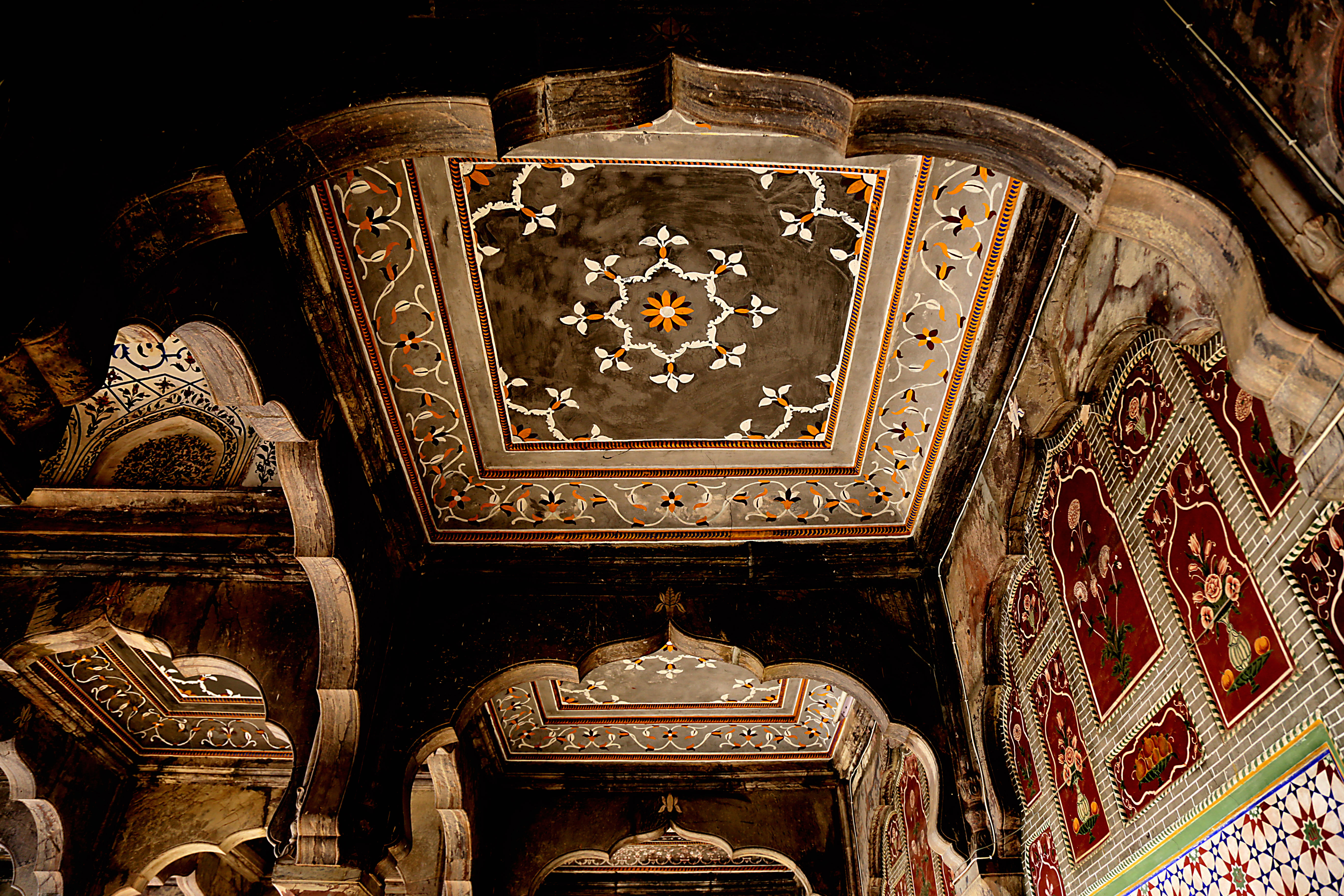
The interior of Chiniot's 17th century Shahi Mosque is richly decorated with Mughal period frescoes.

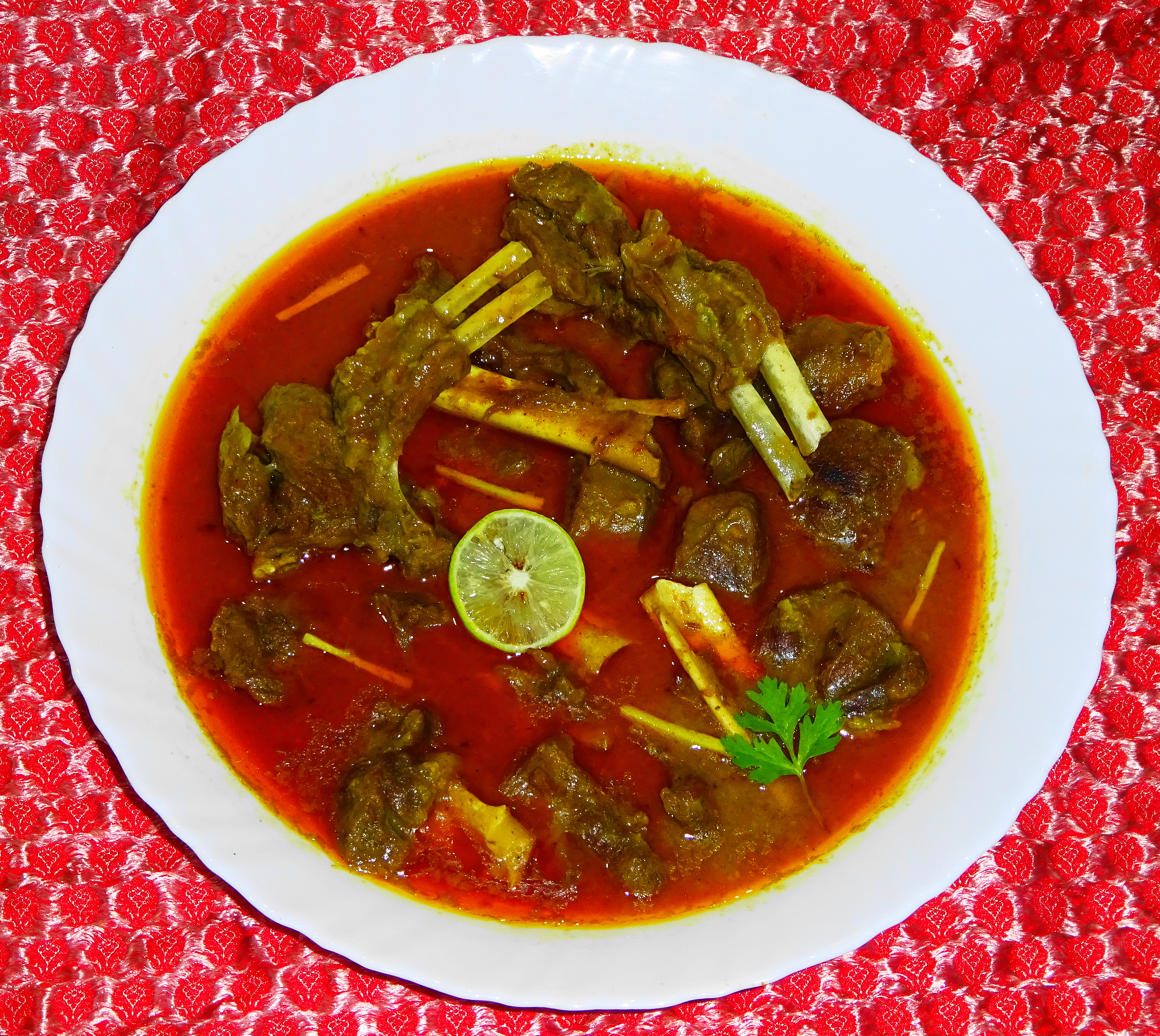
Chiniot-style 'Kunna Gosht'

=== Islamic occasions ===
In Chiniot people celebrate Islamic occasions with great arrangements. On 12 Rabi' al-awwal, 1440th birthday celebration of the Islamic Prophet Muhammad, people of Chiniot arranged a 63-maund cake, one of the largest cakes in the world.

=== Furniture ===
Chiniot is known for its furniture. Chinioti craftsmen and artisans have for centuries carved flowers and geometric patterns onto cellulose fibres. Masons from Chiniot are thought to have been employed during the construction of the Taj Mahal and Golden Temple.

=== Sport ===
Cricket is the most popular sport in Chiniot. Football is also played here. Other popular sports include hockey, volleyball, basketball, badminton, tennis, kabbadi, and horse racing.

== Notable people ==
- Ilyas Chinioti, politician (member of Provincial Assembly, Punjab)
- Manzoor Ahmad Chinioti, father of Ilyas
- Nasir Chinyoti, a famous stage drama comedy actor
- Muhammad Hussain, baseball player
- Sa'adullah Khan Chinioti, Mughal grand vizier
- Wazir Khan, a court physician in Mughal Empire, best known for commissioning Wazir Khan Mosque, Lahore
- Muhammad Masood Lali, politician (member of Provincial Assembly, Punjab)
- Mian Muhammad Mansha, businessman, owner of the MCB Bank Limited and Nishat Group
- Syed Hassan Murtaza, politician (member of Provincial Assembly, Punjab)
- Muhammad Nawaz, former Director General of Pakistan Rangers (Punjab)
- Syed Anayat Ali Shah, politician (MNA)
- Qaiser Ahmed Sheikh, politician and former President of Karachi Chamber of Commerce and Industry
- Saqlain Anwar Sipra, politician in Bhawana

== See also ==
- Bhawana
- Lalian
- Sheikhan
