= Mita Chenabi =

Punjabi poet and physician (c. 1638–1698)

Hakim Mita Chenabi (Punjabi: میتا چنابی; c. 1638– after 1698) was a 17th-century Punjabi poet and physician active during the reign of Aurangzeb. His extant works include Tuḥfat al-Panjāb (The Gift of the Punjab) and ‘Ishqīya-i Panjāb (Romance of the Punjab), both in Persian language.

== Biography ==
Chenabi was from the town of Kalaske in the Subah of Lahore. He claimed to be over 50 at the time of writing Tuḥfat al-Panjāb in 1688–89, which would put his year of birth at around 1638. He was a son of Hakim Darvish (1612– after 1656), a well known physician from Eminabad who had treated members of royal family and nobility on various occasions. Hakim Darvish was also the writer of several books on medicine, including Tībb-e-Aurang Shāhi. Like him, Chenabi trained and practiced as a physician. He also claimed to have met the emperor once.

== Tuḥfat al-Panjāb ==
Mita took his pen name from the river of Chenab. He wrote first of his two extant works, Tuḥfat al-Panjāb, in 1688–89 at his hometown of Kalaske. He divided it into four maqālas (discourses). First begins with praise to God, prophet Muhammad, the saint Baba Farid and the emperor Aurangzeb. In second he discusses his own profession of medicine, describing various diseases, their treatment and qualities which an ideal physician should profess. In third he praises his homeland of Punjab, its cities, and its eminent figures. In fourth he complains of the hardships which had fallen on the people of Punjab after the departure of emperor for the Deccan wars.

In the third discourse, titled "In the praise of Punjab and its saints" (Persian: مدح پنجاب و ستائش بزرگان پنجاب), Chenabi starts with praising the moderate climate of Punjab and states it to be the bridge between Hindustan and Iran. He later praises the city of Multan, its antiquity, and the grandeur and wealth of the city of Lahore, as well as the saints buried in the both cities. He specifically admires the mosques of Wazir Khan in Lahore and Shahi Mosque in Chiniot, and commends their builders Wazir Khan and Sa'adullah Khan. He calls Nawab Sa'adullah Khan as pride of Punjab (فخر پنجاب) and his accomplishments a source of honour for Punjabis. In the ending verses he praises the clan of Gakhars and their chief, Isalat Khan (اصالت خان), and states the clan to be the swordsmen of the Mughal rulers.

== ‘Ishqīya-i Panjāb ==
Chenabi wrote ‘Ishqīya-i Panjāb, a Persian rendering of the classic Punjabi epic of Hir and Ranjha, in 1698. "Casting the western Punjab as a frontier zone", Chenabi introduces himself as being neither from Hind nor from wilayat (foreign land), but from the "land of Chenab". Chenabi completed this work at Kot Kamalia, where Nawab Muhabbat Khan Kharral was his patron.

== Sources ==
- Shah, Zahra (November 1, 2024). "Genre, Place, and the Persian Literary Imagination in the Punjab, ca. 1650–1750". The Journal of Asian Studies. 83 (4): 980–1000. doi:10.1215/00219118-11280905. ISSN 0021-9118.
- Naushahi, Arif (January–June 2010). "مثنوی تحفة الپنجاب میں پنجاب سے متعلق اشعار" (PDF). علمی و تحقیقی مجلہ (in Urdu). 2 (1). International Islamic University, Islamabad: 127–147.
- Naushahi, Arif (2008). "تحفة الپنجاب: عالمگیری عہد میں پنجاب کی معاشرت، عمارات اور رجال پر ایک دلچسپ فارسی مثنوی". تحقیق (in Urdu). 16. Sindh University, Jamshoro: 457–486.
- Fazl-i-Haqq, Qāzī (1957). "'Ishqīya-i Panjāb yā Qisṣạ Hīr wā Māhī". In Bāqir, Muhạmmad (ed.). Punjābī Qisṣạh Fārsī Zabān Men,̣: Bi-ihtimām-i Muhạmmad Bāqir (in Urdu). Vol. 1. Lahore: Punjābī Adabī Ākādimī. OCLC 19033484.
