= Mughal Haryana =

Mughal Haryana may refer to:

- Subah of Delhi, subdivision of the Mughal Empire between 1580–1857
- Subah of Agra, province in the Mughal Empire
