= Shahi Mosque =

Mosque in Chiniot, Punjab, Pakistan

- جامع مسجد شاہی
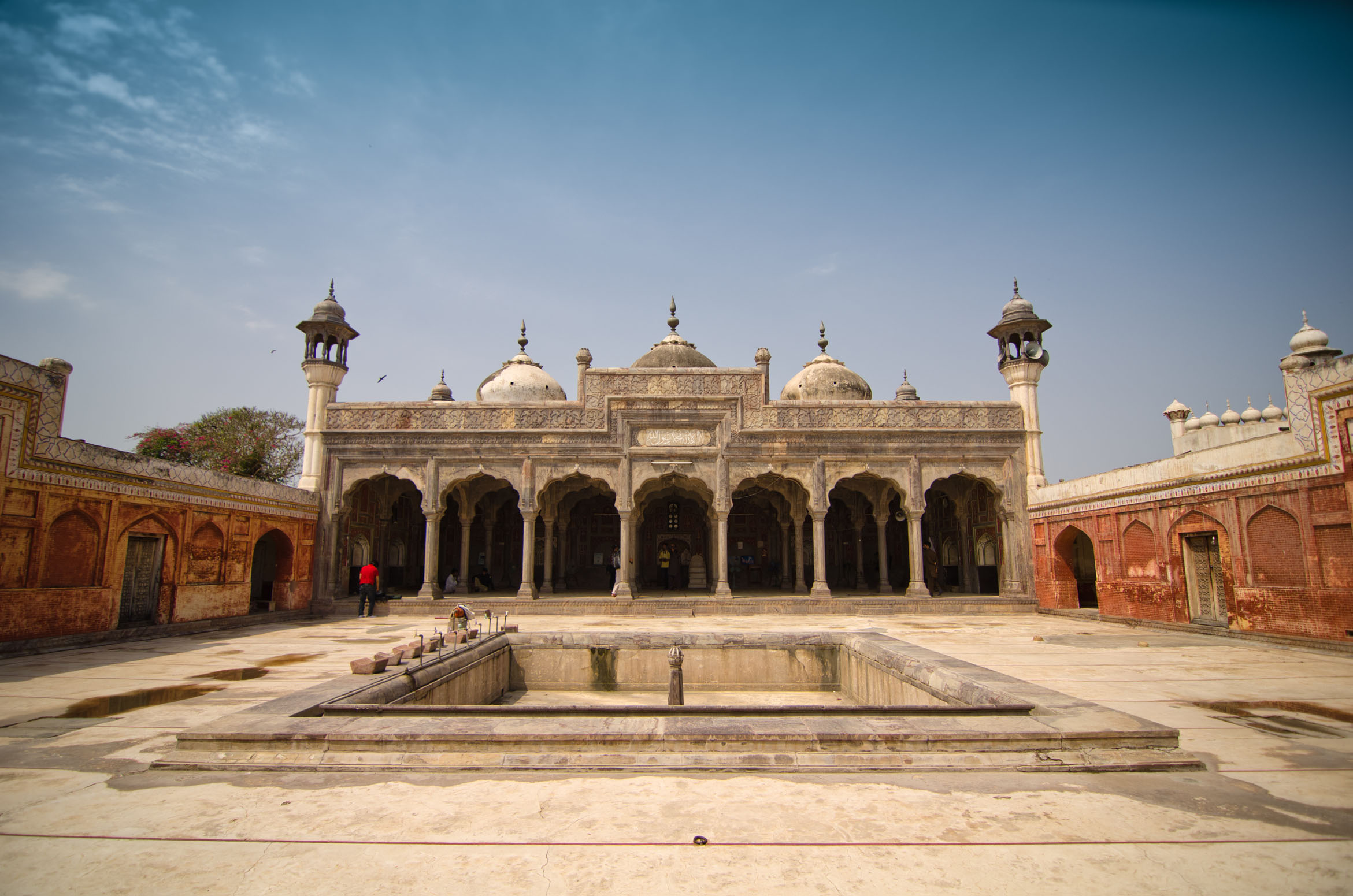
- The mosque exterior in 2012

Religion
- Affiliation: Islam
- Ecclesiastical or organizational status: Mosque
- Status: Active

Location
- Location: Chiniot, Punjab
- Country: Pakistan
- Interactive map of Shahi Mosque
- Coordinates: 31°43′12″N 72°58′37″E

Architecture
- Type: Mosque architecture
- Groundbreaking: 1646
- Completed: 1655; 371 years ago

Specifications
- Dome: Three
- Minaret: Four

Shahi Mosque (Punjabi: شاہی مسیت; Urdu: جامع مسجد شاہی) is a historic 17th century mosque located in Chiniot, Punjab, Pakistan.

Constructed between 1646 and 1655, the Mughal Grand Vizier Saadullah Khan is traditionally identified as its builder; accordingly he built the mosque at the place where he had received his education. However, the 17th-century poet Mita Chenabi attributes its construction to Nawab Hifzullah Khan, the son of Saadullah Khan, when he was the deputy-governor of Punjab.

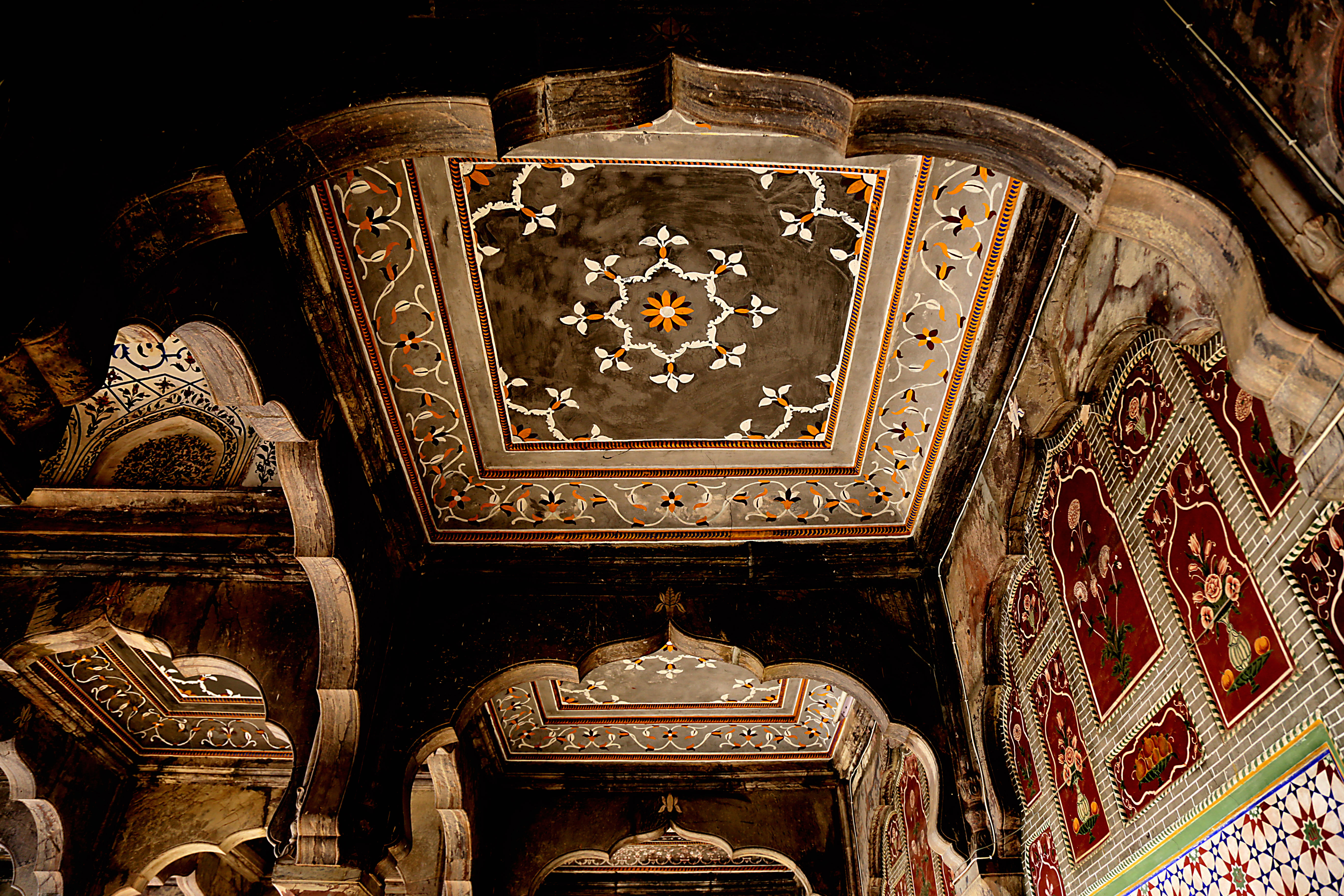
The interior of the mosque

It was constructed with the local dark grey stone known as Chinioti stone, and was designed and built by the local architects. It consists of three domes and four minarets.

== See also ==
- Islam in Pakistan
- List of mosques in Pakistan
