= Mutawassil Khan =

Mutawassil Khan, titled Rustam Jang Bahadur (died 1744) was a Mughal general in the Deccan. Mutawassil Khan rose to power under the patronage of his father-in-law and maternal cousin Nizam-ul-Mulk, accompanying him in his campaigns in the Deccan and distinguishing himself, notably at the Battle of Shakar Kheda.

== Career ==
During the emperor Muhammad Shah's reign, he accompanied Nizam-ul-Mulk Asaf Jah from Malwa to the Deccan, where he distinguished himself with valor in the battle against Sayyid Dilawar Ali Khan while leading one of the wings of the Nizam's army. In the battle with Alam Ali Khan he sustained two wounds. In recognition of his bravery, he was bestowed with a rank of 3,000, accompanied by 2,000 horsemen, the title of Bahadur, and the gifts of a flag and drums. His career saw him serve as the deputy governor of Aurangabad and later as the faujdar of Baglana. Ultimately, he was given the title of Rustam Jang and appointed as the Governor of Bijapur, where he met his demise in 1744.

== Family ==
Mutawassil Khan hailed from a distinguished lineage of notable prominence and was of Punjabi descent. His father, Hifzullah Khan, was a prominent noble of Aurangzeb Alamgir, and his grandfather, Sa'adullah Khan Chinioti, was a much-revered grand vizier of the Mughals during the reign of Shah Jahan. He married Nizam's favourite daughter Khair-un-Nisa Begum. The Nizam was his cousin, and his own son, Muzaffar Jang, succeeded him as the Nawab of Bijapur.
