= Salabat Jung =

Nizam of Hyderabad from 1751 to 1762

- Nizam-ul-Mulk; Asaf-ad-Daulah
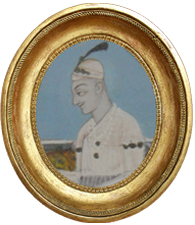

4th Nizam of Hyderabad
- Reign: 13 February 1751 – 8 July 1762
- Predecessor: Muzaffar Jung
- Successor: Mir Nizam Ali Khan, Asaf Jah II
- Born: 24 November 1718; Hyderabad, Mughal Empire (now in Telangana, India)
- Died: 16 September 1763 (aged 44); Bidar Fort
- Burial: Mecca Masjid, Hyderabad, Hyderabad State (now in Telangana, India)
- Issue: 2 sons
- House: Asaf Jahi
- Father: Asaf Jah I

Salabat Jung, born as Mir Sa'id Muhammad Khan Siddiqi Bayafandi on 24 November 1718, was the fourth Nizam of Hyderabad State. He was the third son of Asaf Jah I.

During the Second Carnatic War he was a prisoner, first in Nasir Jung's camp and later in Muzaffar Jung's camp. After Muzaffar Jung (his nephew) was killed by the Afghans on 13 February 1751, Mir Sa'id Muhammad Khan was proclaimed as the new Nizam near Lakkireddipalli Pass, by the French under Marquis de Bussy with the title Asaf-ad-Daulah, Nawab Said Muhammad Khan Bahadur, Salabat Jung, Zafar Jung, Nawab Subahdar of the Deccan. He was promoted to the title of Amir-ul-Mamalik by the Emperor Alamgir II. He was the ruler of the Hyderabad State in India from 1751 until 1762.

The Khilwath Palace of Hyderabad was built under his direction.

== Alliance with the French ==
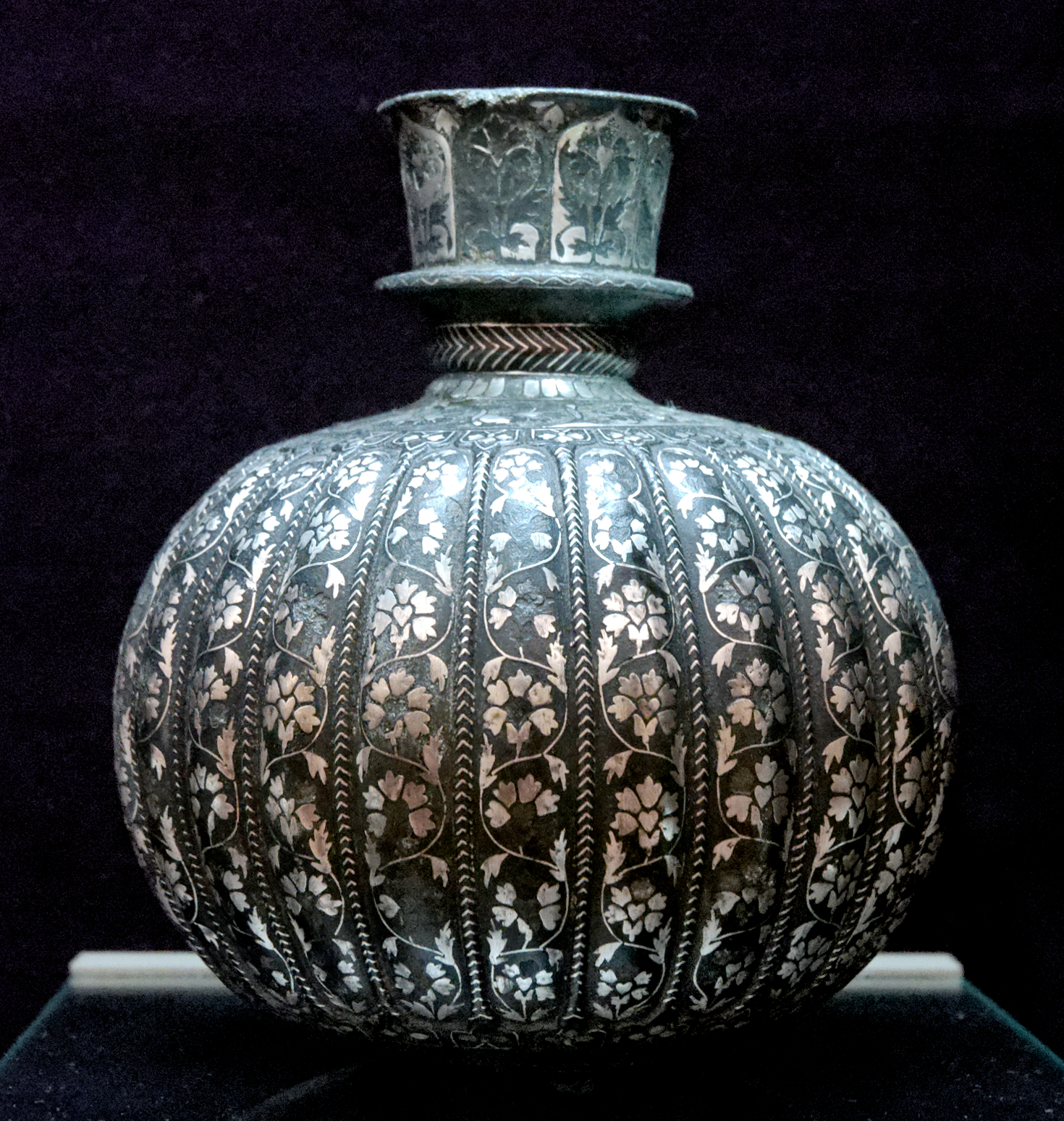
A late 18th-century Bidriware Hookah base at the Louvre provides insight into the alliance between Salabat Jung and de Bussy.

Salabat Jung agreed to retain the French in the Deccan, restoring their previous rights and privileges. He gave the title of Saif-ud-daula Umdat-ul-Mulk to de Bussy and wrote to the Mughal Emperor Alamgir II for ratification, the Mughal Emperor agreed to the decision and granted de Bussy the title of "Mansabdar of 7000" and appointed Hyder Jung as the "Vakil" (attorney) representing the French in the Mughal Empire.

This new alliance with the French had greatly contributed to the advancement of Salabat Jung's forces, in the year 1756 Salabat Jung utilised heavy muskets known as Catyocks, which were attached to the ground, it was known to have fired more rapidly than a cannon.

== Conflict with Marathas ==
In March 1751, Salabat Jung gave the French the villages of Nizampatnam and Alamanava in the Krishna district, Kondavid, Narsapur in the Godavary district, together with Yanaon and Mahfuzbandar. The extirpation of the conspirators against Muzaffar Jung was only the prelude to a more serious contest that threatened his successor to the Nizamat of Hyderabad Deccan, Salabat Jung. He had scarcely crossed the Krishna River when he was met by 25,000 Marathas under the personal command of their Peshwa, Balaji Baji Rao. The Peshwa had entered into a league with Ghazi ud-Din Khan Feroze Jung II, the elder brother of Salabat Jung; had levied a contribution of Rs. 150,000 from Aurangabad, the chief authority of which place was secretly disposed to Ghazi ud-Din Khan Feroze Jung II and now appeared as the ally of the "lawful" Nizam and as the precursor of his appearance in the territories of his father. The Maratha army however disappeared as suddenly as it had presented itself. The invasion of the Deccan by Damaji Rao Gaekwad from Gujarat had forced the Peshwa to retreat.

Salabat Jung made his entry in great pomp and took formal possession of Hyderabad. His first attention was directed to rewarding his allies. Gratuities were bestowed on the officers according to their rank from 100,000 to the commander in chief to 5,000 to each ensign. The future pay of the troops was settled with equal liberality. A communication was opened with Machilipatnam (Masulipatam) and from that port only 220 miles distant the French were supplied with recruits of men, stores and ammunition. De Bussy was thus enabled afterwards to increase his Europeans to 500 and to arm new Sipahis (Native Soldiers) whom he recruited in the country making a total of 5,000 Sipahis. Salabat Jung did not remain long at his capital. The threatened appearance of Ghazi ud-Din, the disaffection of Aurangabad, and the prospect of a renewed invasion by the Marathas required his presence on his northern frontier and he set off for Aurangabad within a month (May 1751) after his arrival.

Salabat Jung reached Aurangabad on 18 June, and in the month of August, Balaji Baji Rao having settled his internal disorders invaded and ravaged the Mughal territory at the head of 40,000 men. The character of the French auxiliaries acquired fresh lustre on this occasion. While at Aurangabad, their discipline and orderly conduct had commanded the respect of the Indians and they now established the superiority of the Salabat Jung over the Marathas. The Peshwa, meanwhile, had ordered Holkar and Scindia to join Ghazi ud-Din and to affect a junction with himself near Aurangabad, occupied by Salabat Jung and his French allies. The news of this fresh campaign dismayed the Nizam and his advisers.

De Bussy said, "Care nothing for the invading army; you will best preserve the Deccan by marching on Poona."

With audacity the French general unfolded his plan and overcame the fears of Salabat Jung. Leaving Aurangabad to its fate, the Mughal prince moved on to Golkonda, and, after some days spent there in preparation, he marched through Pabal, Khedal and Ahmednagar to Bidar on the road to Pune. As he marched, he contrived to send messages to Tarabai at Satara and received from the old queen favourable and encouraging replies.

Near Parner, de Bussy learnt of the approach of a Maratha army. Balaji, angered at the boldness of the Nizam's plan, had been sufficiently affected by it to detach 40,000 horsemen from the main army and lead them in pursuit. The Mughal forces consisted of large irregular levies, quite unfit to meet Balaji's cavalry. But with them were 500 French infantry and 5000 highly disciplined Sipahis led by French officers. On the news of the enemy's vicinity the Muslims formed up to await the Maratha attack.

De Bussy seized some heights on one of the flanks and put his field-pieces on them, so as to command the ground across which the Peshwa must charge. In support of the guns he drew up his disciplined infantry. Balaji attacked the Mughals in the usual Maratha fashion, testing the whole line before charging home. But these proved bad tactics in face of the rapid shooting of the French cannon and the continuous fire of their drilled riflemen. The Maratha army, after suffering some loss, disappeared.

De Bussy led the Mughals on Pune, destroying all the villages through which they passed. The Peshwa retaliated by getting his agents to spread among the Mughals rumours of intended French treachery. De Bussy's answer was a brilliant coup de main. On 22 November, the Marathas were engaged at Kukadi in devotions inspired by an eclipse of the moon. Balaji, like most members of his family, was strict in his religious beliefs and encouraged his soldiers to pray to their gods, to secure an early release of the moon from the clutches of the demon Ketu. While so engaged, they were surprised by de Bussy's attack. The Maratha army did not suffer heavily, but they abandoned their camp, from which the plundering Mughals secured a considerable booty. Among their trophies were the golden utensils used by Balaji Baji Rao for himself and for his gods.

On 27 November 1751, the French general took and sacked Ranjangaon and utterly destroyed Talegaon Damdhere. De Bussy's plan of campaign had succeeded. So far from invading the Nizam's dominions, Balaji Baji Rao was perplexed how to save Pune. He reinforced his army by summoning to it the Scindia contingent, led by Dattaji and Mahadaji Shinde, two sons of Ranu Scindia, and on 27 November 1751, he attacked the Mughal army on the banks of the Ghodnadi river with the utmost determination. The Maratha attack was led by Mahadji Purandare, Dattaji, Mahadaji Shinde, and Kanher Rao Trimbak Ekbote, better known as Kanher Rao Phakde, a native of Purandar. So vigorous was the Maratha charge that Salabat Jung's levies were completely overwhelmed. The day was saved by de Bussy again. Changing his front, he brought his guns to bear on the flank of the charging cavalry with such effect that he enabled the Mughals to rally, and although the Maratha losses were far less than those of their enemies, they eventually withdrew from the field, taking with them Salabat Jung's howdah, four elephants and seven hundred horses. The next day de Bussy pressed on to Koregaon Bhima on the Bhima River, a little town only 16 miles from Pune.

Balaji Baji Rao now decided to follow his foe's example and save his capital by carrying the war into Nizam's country. He directed Sadashivrao Bhau to enter into negotiations with the Nizam's Hindu diwan, Ram Das, to whom Joseph François Dupleix had given the title of Raja Raghunath Das. The plenipotentiaries met, but the negotiations, no doubt at Balaji' s orders, were deliberately drawn out. Before any settlement was arrived at, the Nizam was dismayed to hear that the fort of Trimbak had been escaladed by a Maratha officer.

While the Nizam vainly protested against the outrage and demanded the return of his property, news reached him that Raghuji I was over-running, on his eastern frontier, the whole country between the Painganga River and the Godavari River.

At the same time the Peshwa's agents fomented the discontent of the Mughal soldiery, by charging de Bussy with embezzling their pay, which they had not received for several months. Salabat Jung's confidence in his French general was shaken and he ordered a retreat to Ahmednagar. Having reached that town in safety, the Nizam's courage returned. He replenished his ammunition and collected siege guns for the recapture of Trimbak. He set out northwards, but he was so harassed on his march that he abandoned his enterprise and once again sought de Bussy's counsel. That sagacious soldier saw that it was useless to continue the march on Trimbak. It was useless also to march on Poona, for the Mughals had turned their backs on it and were now 60 miles away. He advised Salabat Jung to ask for an armistice and thus secure his retreat to his own dominions. The Nizam took his advice. On 7 January 1752, Balaji at Shingwa accepted an armistice in return for a promised cession of land. Salabat Jung sent some cakes, and his diwan, Raja Raghunath Das, sent some tulsi leaves as a proof of their good faith; and the defeated Nizam and French army retreated across their own frontier.

During this period the Salabat Jung's government was entirely in the hands of the French. De Bussy personally commanded the army and controlled the civil administration through his agent Raja Raghunath Das. Salabat Jung did not hesitate to address Joseph François Dupleix as his protector and to acknowledge that himself and his states were entirely at his disposal. Salabat Jung ceded a territory round Machilipatnam to the French in September 1751 and conferred the government of the Carnatic on Dupleix and his successors in February 1752. It was probably not intended by Dupleix to displace Chanda Sahib who was yet alive.

== Feroze Jung II's Deccan Expedition and Unrest in Aurangabad ==
Despite his initial victories against the Marathas, Salabat Jung had to retreat to protect his dominions from the North. His army was mutinous for want of pay, and during the homeward march Raja Raghunath Das was assassinated by some Afghan soldiers in April 1752, with whose commander he had quarrelled. The French received a serious shock from the death of Raghunath Das. Salabat Jung was provided with another councillor in whom de Bussy had even more confidence than the recently deceased Ragunath. This was Haider Jung of Machilipatnam, who had earlier entered into the service of the French and learned their language. His abilities attracted the notice of Dupleix and his judgment and fidelity while with Bussy had raised him to great power and high honours. But, to fill the part of minister, it was necessary to find a man of rank who should be able to regulate the mutinous army and embarrassed finances and willing at the same time to be entirely subservient to the French.

The predominance of a body of foreigners and the elevation of their upstart dependents had unavoidably proved disgusting to the nobility of Salabat Jung's court and was felt most by those who but for them would have been at the head of the state. The two most distinguished men of this class were Shah Nawaz Khan Dakhani and Rukan ud-Daulah Syed Lashkar Khan. Shah Nawaz had been minister of Nasir Jung while governing the Deccan as his father's deputy. He joined the prince in his rebellion in 1741 and although his life was spared after the victory of Nizam-ul-Mulk Asaf Jah I, he remained for some years in disgrace. He employed that period in writing a biography of the principal nobles of the preceding age which has contributed more than his political transactions to preserve his reputation in India. On the accession of Nasir Jung he became prime minister and on his death he fled to a hill fort in the Carnatic. He was pardoned and reconciled to Muzaffar Jung through the intervention of Dupleix and probably expected to be restored to his former power. Finding the whole administration committed to Raghunath Das, he became discontented and obtained permission to retire to Aurangabad where he became the head of a party opposed to the French and was the principal mover of the intrigues in that city in favour of Ghazi ud-Din Khan Feroze Jung II. De Bussy was too well aware of Salabat Jung's hostility to trust him with the office of prime minister, but thought it expedient to disarm his opposition by appointing him governor of the province of Hyderabad. Rukan ud-Daulah had also held a high office under Nasir Jung and was no less inimical than Shah Nawaz to the French ascendancy but he had concealed his sentiments with more care; had always been employed under Salabat Jung's government and now appeared to Bussy to be a suitable person to place at the head of the administration. He was accordingly made minister and the French influence seemed as great as ever.

But events in Delhi were going in a different direction. Safdar Jung was the new Vizier of the Mughal Empire and the Amir ul-Umara Ghazi ud-Din Khan Feroze Jung II felt slighted on being left out as the heir to Nizamat of Hyderabad. The motives which led to his acquiescence in the accession of Nasir Jung ceased with that prince's life. The weakness of Salabat Jung's title invited him to assert his own. He therefore solicited the Emperor's nomination to the governorship of the Deccan and at the same time entered on negotiations with Balaji Baji Rao for the purpose of obtaining his support. He left his son, Shihab ud-Din Muhammad Khan, as his deputy in the office of Mir Bakhshi, and proceeded towards the Deccan, taking with him Malhar Rao Holkar, on the promise of paying him money upon his arrival at home. He was acknowledged at Burhanpur by the troops on that frontier. He was joined by the Maratha Peshwa, Balaji Baji Rao in person and when he arrived at Aurangabad on 29 September 1752 his force computed to amount to 150,000 men.

When intelligence of his arrival reached Hyderabad, Salabat Jung, marched out with a great force to oppose his elder brother. Malhar Rao Holkar, being informed of these designs, and seeing that war between the two brothers was imminent, took the opportunity of asking for Khandesh and Khanpur, which were old dependencies of Aurangabad. He foresaw that the struggle with Salabat Jung would be severe, and he deemed it prudent to refrain from taking any part in it.

Ghazi ud-Din Khan had appeared with one of the largest armies ever assembled in the Deccan and it was thought that his succession was inevitable. But no fighting had taken place between the rivals, when Ghazi ud-Din died on 16 October 1752. Muhammad Ibrahim Khan, carried his coffin to Delhi. They also carried with them his money and valuables, exceeding a Rs. 10,000,000 in amount, and delivered them over to his son Shihab ud-Din Muhammad Khan. This young man, whenever his late father was absent, had deemed it best for his interests to be constant in his attentions to Safdar Jung, and by this conduct he had gained the favour of that minister, who showed him great kindness. When the intelligence of his father's death arrived, he communicated the fact to Safdar Jung before it was generally known, and from that day the minister called him his "son". By the minister's influence, he was appointed Mir Bakhshi, and received the title of Amir-ul-Umara Imad-ul-Mulk Ghazi ud-Din Khan Feroze Jung III.

But the Maratha leaders insisted on his carrying out Ghazi ud-Din Khan's engagements. In this they were supported by the Mughals of Burhanpur, who, after the help given by them to Ghazi ud-Din, were afraid to remain Salabat Jung's subjects. The Nizam left the decision to de Bussy. The French general preferred a solid peace to a doubtful war and advised the surrender of a considerable tract of land, provided Raghuji Bhonsle first withdrew from the eastern provinces. Balaji ordered Raghu Bhonsle to do so. He complied.

Thus, in spite of de Bussy's genius and of French valor, the Peshwa acquired in this war the sacred town and fort of Trimbak and the whole country west of Berar from the Tapti to the Godavari. This treaty is known in history as the Treaty of Bhalki (November 1752).

With the death of Ghazi ud-Din Khan, Salabat Jung remained the uncontested Nizam of Hyderabad Deccan. De Bussy advised Salabat Jung to move back to Hyderabad with him, to which he agreed.

== Conquest of Northern Circars by the French ==
The acquisition of the Northern Circars is an important landmark in the history of the French in India. It placed at their disposal a contiguous territory of 470 miles of sea coast stretching from Orissa to the Coromandel Coast. These territories were also noted for their economic wealth; Machilipatnam was noted at this period for its dyeing and printing industry, while Rajahmundry abounded in rich teak forests. Srikakulam (Chicacole) was a rice-producing area. The presence of the Eastern Ghats made this region unvulnerable to outside attack. The Eastern Ghats abounded in thick bamboo forests, and in those days of infantry and cavalry warfare, it was difficult for the enemy to penetrate through them.

The acquisition was made possible by the uprising of Syed Lashkar Khan who was bitterly opposed to the French predominance and other noblemen in the region. The treasury of the Nizam, was almost empty and the Nizam's troops had not been paid for six months. Salabat Jung found it still more difficult to pay the French detachment, and their pay was in arrears for two months. The French Sipahis, threatened to rebel, if their arrears were not paid, and Salabat Jung was forced to pay their salaries by raising a loan of 150,000 Rupees from the local Circars and from the revenue of Hyderabad. But the troops of the Nizam had to go without their pay. So, these soldiers started clamouring for the payment of their arrears and refused to go on the proposed Carnatic expedition unless their arrears were cleared. The general discontent was so great in the Nizam's army that even the nagar-beaters and camel drivers took a solemn oath not to proceed to the Carnatic until their salaries were paid. The Mughal soldiers openly went about saying, that the French were robbing the Nizam of his riches, which the family had accumulated for the past 60 years, while the subjects of the Nizam, were starving. Their discontent was so great, that they went to the extent of threatening the life of Rumi Khan Fransisi, the agent of the French. De Bussy was ordered to ask Salabat Jung for the grant of the four Northern Circars, namely Ellore, Mustafanagar, Rajahmundry, and Srikakulam (Chicaole), towards the maintenance of the French detachment. De Bussy moved the matter with Salabat Jung, but Syed Lashkar Khan, saw, that the consideration of the matter was postponed for the time being and before Bussy could further move in the matter, he had to go to Machilipatnam on account of his illness.

Taking advantage of the financial distress of the Nizam and the general indiscipline that had crept into the French forces, Syed Lashkar Khan used all his ingenuity to make the French unpopular and their stay, untenable in the Deccan. He started exploring his moorings in a very cautious manner. Early in April 1753 he appealed to the British, to leave no stone unturned and to assist him to expel the French. The letter of Syed Lashkar Khan was intercepted by the spies of Dupleix but Syed Lashkar Khan, even after knowing it, did not desist from intriguing against the French. Though the plans of Syed Lashkar Khan against the French were welcome to the English, they could not send him any material help owing to their preoccupations in the Carnatic affairs. Syed Laskhar Khan tried to harass the French by with-holding their salaries. To the original detachment of 300 Europeans and 2000 Sipahis, Bussy added further a battalion of 5000 Sipahis, and all these were entirely under the personal command of Bussy. All together, their salaries amounted to, Rs. 250,000, per month.

Bussy, accordingly started from Machilipatnam on 25 June 1753, and reached Hyderabad on 15 July 1753. He arrived in Hyderabad with the firm resolve not to leave the Deccan unless the financial condition of the Nizam warranted such a step. On his arrival he found that the French commandant Goupil was busy elsewhere, collecting the revenues, and that great confusion and disorder prevailed in the French ranks. He soon restored order and discipline among the 500 Europeans and 4000 Sipahis who were in Hyderabad and opened negotiations with the Qiladar, Mahmud Hussain. The latter, realising that Bussy was not the man to mince matters, arranged the necessary money for the payment of the French troops. Bussy, cleared the arrears of pay of the troops partly by raising money from the Bankers and partly by advancing from his own private funds.

De Bussy then called upon Goupil and Mainville to submit accounts of the money, so for, collected by the French troops. He found on a careful scrutiny of the accounts submitted that the French had over-reached themselves in collecting taxes, and that they extorted gratuities from the Nawabs and Palaiyakkarars (polygars) and oppressed the people in general. When Dupleix was informed of this he sent the following letter of admonition to the French officers;

I have been informed that several of you have worried and tried the Nawab and other lords by the irksome demands for gratuities, almost always ill-founded. As such a procedure can be nothing else than extremely harmful to the transactions of the Company as also to the glory of the King and the nation, as it tends to bring disgust even to the very ones who much need our protection. It is absolutely essential to prohibit in the future all endeavours which have the slightest appearance of a solicitation and to forbid visits to the lords except after receiving the sanctum of the commander. Moreover, you are warned, that you are all bound to consider yourself as being directly in the service of the king and the Company that you must deem yourself very fortunate to draw the higher salaries which you receive and that on no account you should think of gratuities except in so far as circumstances may allow and that they shall be freely granted by those who have the power to do so. The King, the Company and I will it so and whosoever does not submit shall be a rebel.

De Bussy realised that the irresponsible and arrogant manner of the French soldiers had alienated the people from them and that intrigues were afoot in the court against the French. Syed Lashkar Khan, the Marathas, especially Janu Nimbalkar and Raja Ram Chander, and the English at Fort St. George were interested in ousting, the French power from the Deccan. Syed Lashkar Khan, even after the arrival of Bussy, did not desist from plotting against the French. He induced Salabat Jung to write to Dupleix that the arrears, due to the French troops must be deducted From the Rs. 5,000,000 that Dupleix owed to the Nizam, as his deputy in the Carnatic. He also proposed that during the rainy season the French troops should be stationed at Machilipatnam so that they could collect the revenues with greater ease. Syed Lashkar Khan, though he advised the French in the above manner, at the same time sent secret instructions to the zamindars on the East Coast not to pay taxes to the French and to attack the French jagirs in the various districts. Encouraged by such messages, Raja Ram Chander of Ongole seized Bandurti with the help of the English.

Syed Lashkar Khan also put two younger brothers of Salabat Jung, Nizam Ali Khan and Basalat Jung into prison in the Fort of Daulatabad on the plea that the latter were intriguing with de Mainville and ordered the French Commandant to return forthwith to Hyderabad.

He also made Salabat Jung to write to Bussy, suggesting that the French should stay, during the monsoons in Machilipatnam and that the Nizam would call them whenever he required their assistance. Apart from this, no sooner did he hear that Mahmud Hussain, the Qiladar of Hyderabad, had assisted Bussy in arranging the loans for the payment of the French troops, than he got him replaced by a new Governor. Seeing these manoeuvres, De Bussy decided to deal with Syed Lashkar Khan, in a very drastic manner. He decided to adopt one of the following three courses; namely; to demand from the Nizam fresh territories lo maintain, the French forces and if the Subah refused to grant them, to seize certain territories and attach them to Machilipatnam which was under Moracin and inform Salabat Jung that those territories would be safe guarded by the French for the Nizam. But if either of these plans failed, Bussy, even decided to get the help of the Peshwa, against the Nizam in exchange for Surat being ceded to the Marathas. On being informed of these plans, Dupleix fully concurred with them and he sent to Bussy an additional force of 350 men. Of these, Bussy, dispatched 150 men to Machilipatnam, under the command of the Marquis of Conflans.

Feeling himself sufficiently strong, Bussy now decided to march against Aurangabad. Prior to this, he sent a letter to Salabat Jung, in which he reminded him that if he became the Deccan Subahdar it was mainly due to the efforts of the French. Saunders, the English Governor, remarked;

The weakness of the Moors is now known and it is certain any European nation resolved to wage war on them with a tolerable force may overrun the whole country.

De Bussy in Aurangabad in November 1753. His journey to Aurangabad was full of obstacles and he had to meet the silent opposition of the people, inspired by the manoeuvres of Syed Lashkar Khan. Seeing this, Bussy decided to enter Aurangabad in full battle array; Syed Lashkar Khan seeing the preparations made by Bussy decided to yield and opened negotiations with the latter. On Bussy's arrival, Syed Lashkar Khan at the head of 21 nobles mounted on elephants went to receive him. Bussy, when he met them, contrived to arrange their order of arrival in such a manner that they had to dismount first as though doing obeisance to the French General.

On approaching Bussy, the Diwan, Syed Lashkar Khan dismounted from his elephant and bowed to the French General, seeing which, the other Deccan nobles followed suit. Bussy, getting down from his elephant embraced the Diwan. The latter then offered to surrender his official seals as a token of his resignation. De Bussy perceived that Syed Lashkar Khan was popular with the people, and whatever intrigues he had carried on against the French he had done for the noble purpose of ridding his country and his ruler of foreign domination. De Bussy realised that however much he desired to get rid of the minister, making him resign openly was not the proper method. Hence he refused to accept the seals, and mildly hinted to the Diwan, that he would be satisfied with the cession of the Northern Circars to the French.

The Northern Circars, constituted the most fertile coastal strip of the Nizam's Dominions. They were watered by the three important rivers of the Deccan, the Krishna River, the Godavari and the Gundlakamma. Syed Lashkar Khan was loath to part with those fertile regions and he asked De Bussy, whether he would not be satisfied with territorial grants in the interior; but on finding that Bussy had set his heart on the acquisition of the Northern Circars alone, he gave way. On 23 November, a grand court was held at Aurangabad, and the treaty of Aurangabad, was signed between Salabat Jung and the French. By this treaty the four Northern Circars, Ellore, Mustafanagar (Kondapalli) Rajahmundry and Srikakulam (Chicacole) were granted to the French. The Sarkars were personally conferred on Bussy towards the maintenance of the French troops. It was also decided that the revenues of the Circars should be spent exclusively for disbursing the pay of the French troops.

At this period a Mughal Governor Jafar Ali, was in charge of the revenue administration of the Circars. So it was settled that if Jafar Ali, failed to remit the revenues to Bussy within the stipulated time, the sum should be made good from the treasury of the Nizam. Secondly, the safety of the person of Salabat Jung was entrusted to the care of the French, and further, it was agreed that the Nizam should not interfere in the administration of the Subah of Carnatic. It was also mutually agreed, that in matters of general administration also, the Nizam should govern the country in accordance with the wishes of De Bussy. De Bussy in his turn agreed to support and befriend Syed Lashkar Khan. Soon after receiving the patent for the Sarkars, Bussy, instructed the French agent at Machilipatnam to take charge of those territories, and he dispatched 150 Europeans and 2500 Sipahis to French commander Moracin at Machilipatnam, to bring those territories under the French control.

== Death ==
Salabat Jung was deposed by his brother, Asaf Jah II Mir Nizam Ali Khan Siddiqi, on 8 July 1762. He was ordered held in Bidar Fort prison, where he was killed on 16 September 1763. He was buried at Bidar outside the dargah of Multani pasha (bustan e Asifia by manik rao vital rao).

Salabat Jung Asaf Jahi dynasty
Preceded by Muzaffar Jung	Nizam of Hyderabad; 13 February 1751 – 8 July 1762	Succeeded by Mir Nizam Ali Khan, Asaf Jah II
