= Agra Subah =

Province in the Mughal Empire

- 1558–1761
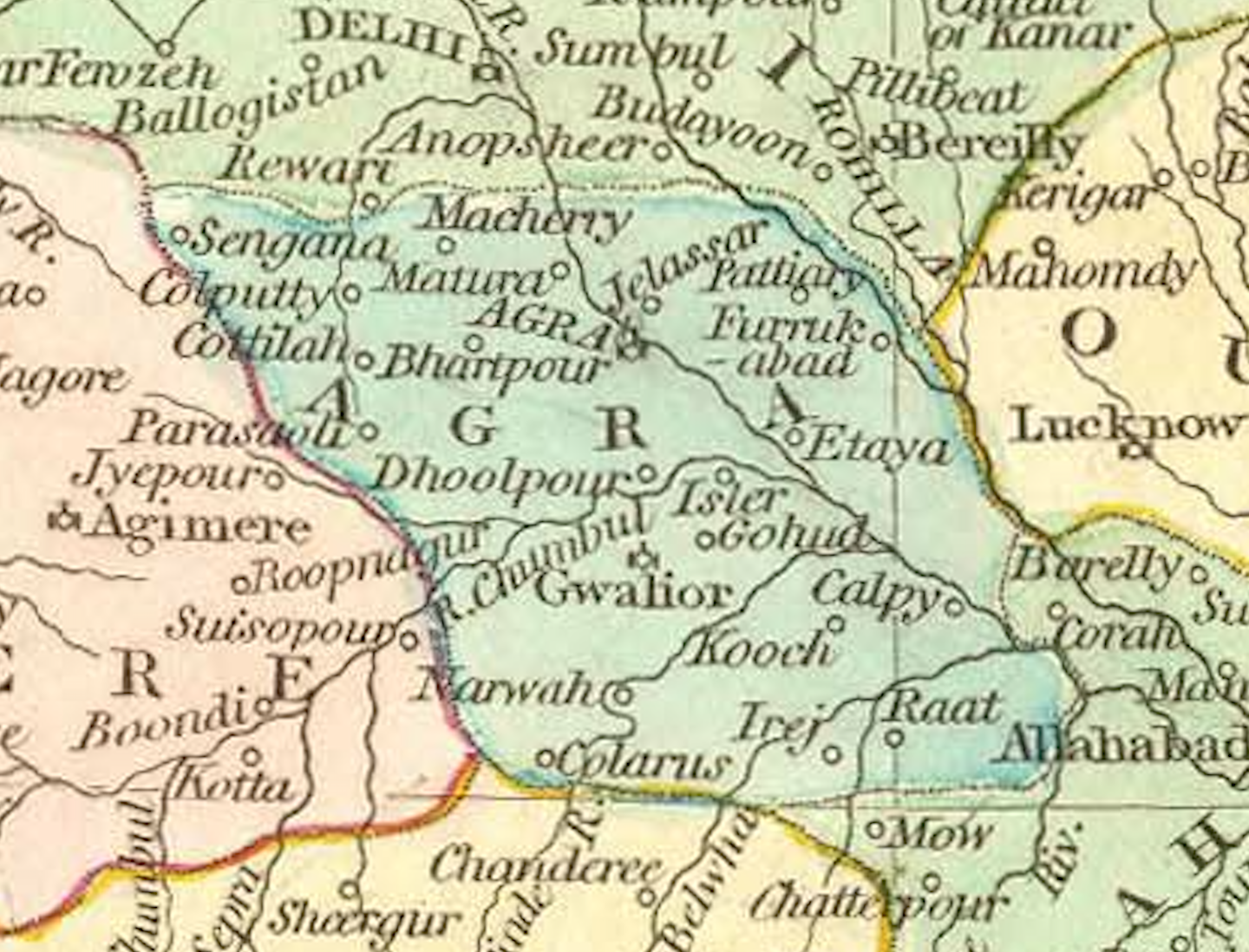
- Agra Subah depicted in map of Mughal Empire by Robert Wilkinson (1805)
- Capital: Agra
- Subahdar
- Historical era: Early-modern period
  - Established: 1558
  - Suraj Mal's conquest of Agra: 12 June 1761

Area
  - 1601: 46,417 sq mi (120,220 km^{2})
Preceded by	Succeeded by
Delhi Sultanate	Bharatpur State; Maratha Confederacy
- Today part of: India

The Agra Subah (Persian: صوبه آگره) was a subah (province) of the Mughal Empire established during the reign of Akbar. It was one of the empire's principal administrative divisions. To the north it bordered Delhi and Awadh, to the east Allahabad, and to the south and west Malwa and Ajmer. Its capital was at Agra, an important administrative center of the empire which was expanded under Mughal rule.

== Administrative divisions ==
The province was divided into 13 sarkars during the reign of Akbar.

Sarkar
Agra (capital)
Kalpi
Kannauj
Kol
Gwalior
Erach
Payanwan
Narwar
Mandlaer
Alwar
Tijara
Narnaul
Sahar

== Subahdars ==
=== Under Shah Jahan ===
Qasim Khan

Wazir Khan

Islam Khan

Safdar Khan

Syed Khan Jahan

Azam Khan

Saif Khan

Raja Bethal Das

Shaikh Farid

=== Others ===
Qasim Khan Juvayni

Wazir Khan (Lahore), 1628-1631

Rajaram II of Satara
