= Ilyas Chinioti =

Pakistani politician

Member of the Provincial Assembly of the Punjab
- In office 15 August 2018 – 14 January 2023
- Constituency: PP-94 Chiniot-II
- In office 2008 – 31 May 2018
- Incumbent
- Assumed office 24 February 2024

Personal details
- Born: 31 December 1961 (age 64) Chiniot, Punjab, Pakistan
- Party: PMLN (2008-present)
- Children: 6
- Parent: Manzoor Ahmad Chinioti (father)

Al-Haaj Muhammad Ilyas Chinioti is a Pakistani politician who has been a Member of the Provincial Assembly of the Punjab, from 2008 to May 2018 and from August 2018 till January 2023.

== Early life and education ==
He was born on 31 December 1961 in Chiniot, Punjab to Maulana Manzoor Ahmad Chinioti, an Islamic scholar and politician.

He obtained his Master's degree in Arabic from Wifaq-ul-Madaris Al-Arabia, Multan in 1983, a Diploma in Arabic Language from Umm al-Qura University, Makkah, Saudi Arabia in 1986 and his master's degree in Islamic Studies from University of the Punjab, Lahore in 2008.

== Political career ==
He was elected to the Provincial Assembly of the Punjab as a candidate of Pakistan Muslim League (N) (PML-N) from Constituency PP-73 (Jhang-I) in the 2008 Pakistani general election.

He was re-elected to the Provincial Assembly of the Punjab as a candidate of PML-N from Constituency PP-73 (Jhang-I) in the 2013 Pakistani general election.

He was re-elected to Provincial Assembly of the Punjab as a candidate of PML-N from Constituency PP-94 (Chiniot-II) in the 2018 Pakistani general election.

== Books ==
Among his books feature The Case of Hazrat Essa in the Court of Christians (2011) and Arbaeen-e-Khatam-e-Nabuwat (2014).
