= Muzaffar Jang Hidayat =

Nizam of Hyderabad from 1750 to 1751

- Nizam-ul-Mulk
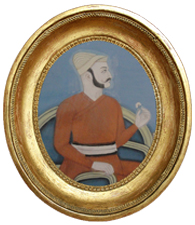
- Muzaffar Jang Hidayat

3rd Nizam of Hyderabad
- Reign: 16 December 1750 – 13 February 1751
- Predecessor: Nasir Jung
- Successor: Salabat Jung
- Died: 13 February 1751
- Father: Mutawassil Khan
- Mother: Khair-un-nisa Begum
- Religion: Islam

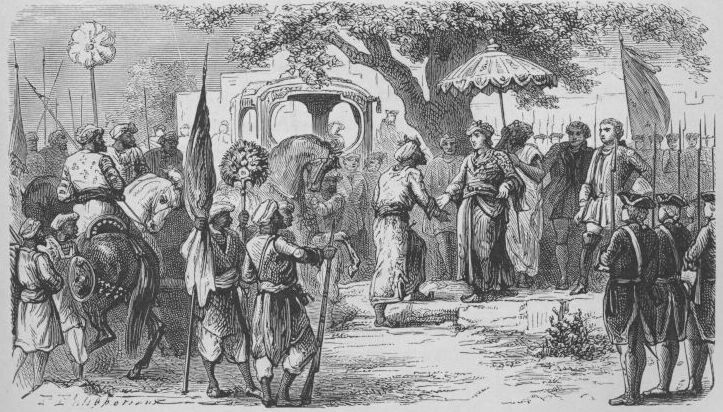
Dupleix meeting the Subahdar of the Deccan, Muzaffar Jung.

Muhyi ad-Din Muzaffar Jang Hidayat (died 13 February 1751) was the Mughal Subahdar of Deccan and the third Nizam of Hyderabad from 1750 until his death in 1751.

He had taken up the title of Nawab Khan Bahadur, Muzaffar Jung, Nawab Subadar of the Deccan. However, he is better known as Muzaffar Jung.

== Early life ==
Muzaffar Jung was born to Nawab Mutawassil Khan, the Naib Subahdar of Bijapur, and his wife Sahibzadi Khair-un-Nisa Begum, the daughter of Nizam-ul-Mulk. He was a great-grandson of Sa'adullah Khan Chinioti, the last Grand Wazir of Shah Jahan.

== Reign ==
As per the 1749 British records of Fort St. George, Nizam-ul-Mulk even thought about installing Muzaffar Jung when he was dissatisfied with the conduct of Nasir Jung. He gave up that idea due to possible serious repercussions and reconciled with Nasir Jung. He recommended for bestowing the Circars of Adoni and Raichur to Muzaffar Jung with acceptance of the Padishah.

Initially, he was appointed to an Imperial mansab of 3,000 zat and 2,000 sowar, he was appointed as the Governor of Carnatic, later promoted to 4,000 zat on his appointment to Bijapur. He was Subadar of Bijapur after the death of his father. When his grandfather Nizam-ul-Mulk died in 1748, he decided to stake his claim to the throne in opposition to his uncle, Nasir Jung. This resulted in the first major direct involvement of the Europeans in Indian domestic politics. He joined hands with his Carnatic ally Chanda Sahib and the French while Nasir Jung joined hands with his Carnatic ally Muhammad Ali Khan Walajah and the British. Eventually, the serious situation in Deccan and Carnatic would result in the Second Carnatic War. During the war Muzaffar Jung was briefly captured in March, 1750 after the Battle of Villianur. But after the assassination of Nasir Jung, he was released and took the throne of Hyderabad, 16 December 1750. He granted territories and titles to Dupleix and the French on 31 December 1750.

== Death ==
While Muzaffar Jung's relations with the French were sound, he failed to assuage his Afghan allies in a similar way. The resulting disagreement escalated into the Battle of Lakkireddipalli Pass in the Rayachoti taluka, Kadapa district. In the conflict, the Nawab of Kurnool struck him in the head with a spear, 13 February 1751 killing him instantly. Muzzafar Jung's death lead to the deaths of the Nawab of Kurnool, Himmat Bahadur and Nawab of Savanur, Abdul Majid Khan I.

At this critical juncture in history the French commander De Bussy made the decision to install Salabat Jung as the new Nizam.

== Family ==
Muzaffar Jung had only one son, Nawab Muhammad Sa'ad ud-din Khan Bahadur, who was a minor at the death of his father in February 1751. He became Subedar of Bijapur in 1751, and died later from smallpox.

== Positions held ==
Muzaffar Jang Hidayat
Preceded by Nasir Jung Mir Ahmad	Nizam of Hyderabad; 16 December 1750 – 13 February 1751	Succeeded by Asif ad-Dawlah Mir Ali Salabat Jung
Preceded by Nawab Talib Muhi ud-din Mutawassil Khan Bahadur	Subedar of Bijapur ? – 13 February 1751	Succeeded by Nawab Muhammad Sa'ad ud-din Khan Bahadur

== See also ==
- Hyderabad State
- Nizam
