= Muhammad Masood Lali =

Muhammad Masood Lali محمد مسعود لالی

Muhammad Masood Lali (Punjabi, Urdu: محمد مسعود لالی)(born 21 August 1951) is a Pakistani politician from Kanwain Wala, Chiniot.

== Early life and education ==
He was born on 21 August 1951 in Chiniot District. He is an agriculturist by profession. He is educated from GCU, Lahore of Master in Political science. He belongs to Lali, a Jat clans tribe in Chiniot District.

== Early in politics ==
He has been the Chairman of union councils in his area 3 times in his life. He has been also Naib Nazim of Chiniot Tehsil (2002–2005).

== Political career ==
He elected in 2008 Pakistan general elections for the seat of MPA from constituency no. PP-80 (Jhang-VIII). He was elected from the party Pakistan Muslim League (N).

== See also ==
- Chiniot
- Pakistan Muslim League (N)
