= Omar Hayat Mahal =

- عمر حیات محل
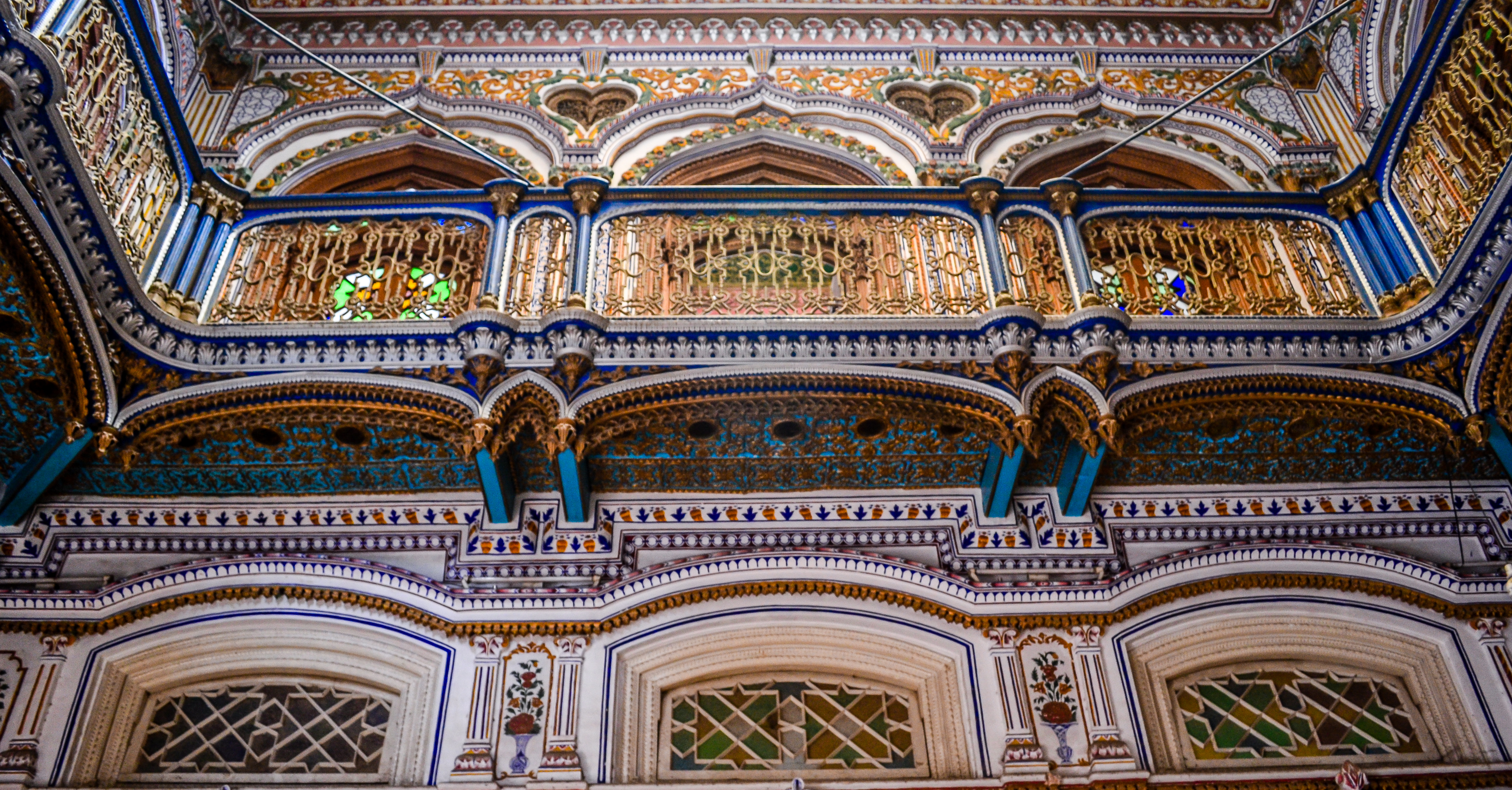
- Interior view of the mansion
- Interactive map of the Omar Hayat Mahal area
- Alternative names: Umer Hayat Mahal; Gulzar Manzil

General information
- Type: Haveli
- Architectural style: Indo-Saracenic Revival, Mughal Revival
- Location: Chiniot, Pakistan
- Coordinates: 31.719217°N 72.980056°E
- Construction started: 1923
- Completed: 1935
- Cost: Rs 200,000 (1935)
- Client: Sheikh Omar Hayat Vohra
- Owner: Municipal Committee Chiniot

Technical details
- Material: Wood, Brick, Stucco
- Floor count: 5 (original)

Omar Hayat Mahal (Urdu: عمر حیات محل), also spelt Umer Hayat Mahal, and alternatively known as Gulzar Manzil, is an early 20th-century wooden haveli mansion in Chiniot, Pakistan.

Construction of the mansion was started in 1923, and completed by 1935. The mansion, originally 5-storeys tall, was built by Sheikh Omar Hayat – a Chinioti businessman who had made his fortune in Calcutta. The edifice displays outstanding examples of Chiniot's local woodworking craftsmanship, and has been described as an "ornament" of a building on account of its lavishly decorated interior.

== History ==
Sheikh Omar Hayat Vohra migrated from Chiniot to Calcutta in the late 19th century after being ostracised for marrying against his family's wishes. Large numbers of Chiniot's Sheikh tribe had settled in Calcutta during the British era.

Sheikh Omar's first son, Gulzar Vohra, was born in 1920, prompting Sheikh Omar's decision to return to his hometown, where he decided to construct a magnificent palace that would feature the best of Chiniot's craftsmanship.

Syed Hassan Shah was assigned the task of the mansion's construction. He gathered the best artisans from Chiniot, as well as from other places, who continued working for 10 years to complete the structure. Rahim Bakhsh Pirjha and Elahi Bakhsh Pirjha, masters in the manabat kari style of wood carving, carried out much of the mansion's woodwork. Ahmad Din completed the brickwork, while the celebrated artist Niaz Ahmad Jalandari did the stucco-work. Another celebrated artist, Jan Muhammad, painted the mansion's frescoes.

The mansion was habitable by 1930, and described as a 'local wonder' by the British authors of the District Gazetteer of Jhang. It was completed in 1935 - at a cost of 200,000 rupees. Sheikh Omar died shortly after its completion in 1935.

Sheikh Omar Hayat's only son, Gulzar Vohra, was married in the mansion in an extravagant ceremony in 1937. Gulzar was found dead in the palace the very next day of his marriage, possibly due to carbon monoxide poisoning as a result of large volumes of coal that had been burned for the celebration. He was buried in the courtyard of the ground floor of the palace, alongside the grave of his mother Fatima who later passed.

Hayat Vohra's relatives abandoned the mansion, associating it with bad luck. Servants continued living there for a couple of years, though no family members laid claim to the building. In 1940, the Anjuman-e-Islamia organisation opened a school in the building. An orphanage was established in 1948 by Sheikh Muhammad Amin, though it was shifted in 1950, leaving the building abandoned once again. Local scavengers later dismantled some of the mansion's decorative elements, and sold them to collectors in other cities.

Two levels of the mansion was removed in the 1970s due to its state of dangerous disrepair, while another level had to be abandoned following severe rains in 1993. The building was brought under government control in 1989, with large portions repaired by the mid-1990s with funds raised by the local community. The mansion is now used as a cultural centre and library.

== Architecture ==
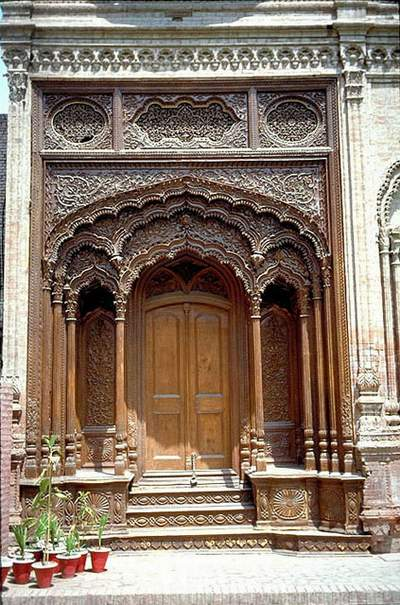
Front Door.

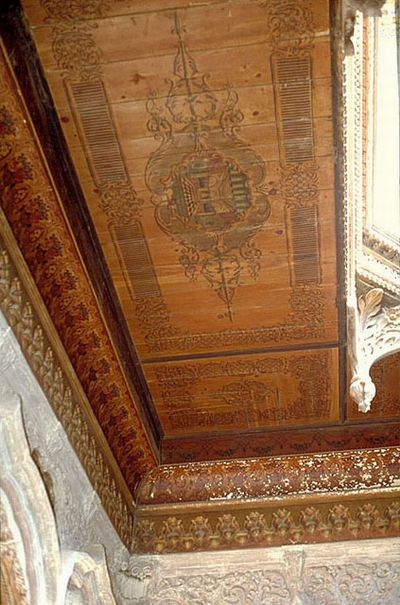
Beautiful carvings on ceiling and walls.

The palace's building is perhaps the last of Mughal's architectural style, or a Mughal Revival building ("revival" buildings are interpretations of an old architectural style by people of a later era). Unique carving cuts on the doors, windows and jhirokas reflect a colour of their own. The roofs, balconies, stairways, terrace and the stucco designs make a perfect interior. The facade of the building is decorated with a fine inlay of bricks, the dazzling shine of marble and picturesque shades help it rank among the great palaces of Mughal era landlords.

== Conservation ==
Later on this placed was occupied by Qabza mafia who destroyed most of the building However seeing death of its glory in 1989, M. Athar Tahir, the then deputy commissioner of Jhang, took note of the mansion's poor state. He removed the encroachments, and brought the building under government ownership. Muhammad Amjad Saqib, Chiniot's assistant commissioner, led a fundraising effort to raise money for the mansion's repair, and started its restoration with an expenditure of Rs1,700,000.

On 7 June 1990, it was decided that the Gulzar Manzil be acquired for the people, be conserved and restored. By the mid 1990s, large portions of the mansion had been repaired or restored, although the quality of some restoration works was poor.

Upon completion, it was decided that the mansion would be accorded a more dynamic role in the life of Chiniot, and thus a massive fund-raising drive was initiated for its conversion into a library and cultural centre. With the help of philanthropists and municipal authorities, the conversion efforts commenced on 14 August 1990. A rare collection of thousands of books and subscription for seven dailies was introduced to learners and It was publicly opened the then Punjab Governor, Mian Muhammad Azhar.

Keeping the vision and wishes of its owner in view, the library in the Gulzar Manzil was named after Sheikh Omar Hayat. In 1997 the municipal committee refused to bear the expenses and terminated the subscription of newspapers and other reading materials. At present the palace is again in disrepair, though the facade and interiors are well-maintained. The upper-most floors remain in a state of disrepair, however.
