= Manzoor Ahmad Chinioti =

Pakistani politician

Maulana Manzoor Ahmad Chinioti
- مولانا منظور احمد چنیوٹی

Member of the Provincial Assembly of the Punjab
- In office 1985–1988
- In office 1988–1990
- In office 1997–1999

Personal life
- Born: 31 December 1931 Chiniot, Punjab, British India
- Died: 27 June 2004 (aged 72) Lahore, Punjab, Pakistan
- Cause of death: Kidney failure
- Children: Ilyas Chinioti
- Parent: Haji Ahmad Bakhsh (father)
- Citizenship: British Indian (1931-1947); Pakistani (1947-2004)
- Political party: Jamiat Ulema-e-Islam
- Notable idea: International Khatme Nabuwat Movement
- Education: Sindh Madressatul Islam University; Jamia Taleem ul Quran Rawalpindi

Religious life
- Religion: Islam
- Denomination: Sunni
- Institute: Jamia Arabia Chiniot; Jamia-tul-Madina
- Founder of: Jamia Arabia Chiniot; Idara Markazia Dawat o Irshad Chiniot
- Movement: Khatam an-Nabiyyin

Manzoor Ahmad Chinioti (Urdu; مولانا منظور احمد چنیوٹی) (born; 31 December 1931– 27 June 2004) was a Pakistani Islamic scholar, politician and writer.

== Early life and education ==
Manzoor Ahmad Chinioti got his education from Sindh Madressatul Islam University, and Jamia Taleem ul Quran Rawalpindi. He founded Jamia Arabia Chiniot.

== Academic career ==
He served as visiting professor at Jamia-tul-Madina.

== Political career ==
He served as a councilor in his hometown and chairman of the Chiniot Municipal Committee in 1993. He was also elected Member of the Provincial Assembly of the Punjab in 1985, 1988 and 1997.

He also served as the central leader of the International Khatme Nabuwat Movement.

== Death ==
He died on 27 June 2004.

== Writings ==
He authored a variety of religious treatises, pamphlets, and books—primarily defending the Finality of Prophethood (Khatm-e-Nubuwwat) and critiquing the Ahmadiyya movement. His works were frequently published via Islamic publishing outlets and circulated in Urdu-speaking Pakistani religious circles.

- خَسُوف و کَسُوف (Khasūf o Kasūf, "Eclipse and Solar Eclipse") – English-language treatise ddressing theological interpretations of eclipses in Islamic tradition.
- پیغامِ ہدایت (Paighām‑e‑Hidāyat, "Message of Guidance") – Urdu booklet on spiritual and doctrinal guidance.
- مقالاتِ ختمِ نبوت (Maqālāt‑e‑Khatm‑e‑Nubuwwat, "Articles on the Finality of Prophethood") – Compilation of writings on defending the doctrine of Khatm‑e‑Nubuwwat.
- مناظرے ناروے (Munāzra‑e‑Norway, "Debate in Norway") – Record of a debate held in Norway on the Ahmadis, documenting theological refutations in Urdu.

Additionally, Chinioti produced numerous Urdu and English pamphlets, audio lectures, and fatwas.

== See also ==
- List of Deobandis
