= Thaheem (tribe) =

Jat tribe found in Punjab and Sindh, Pakistan

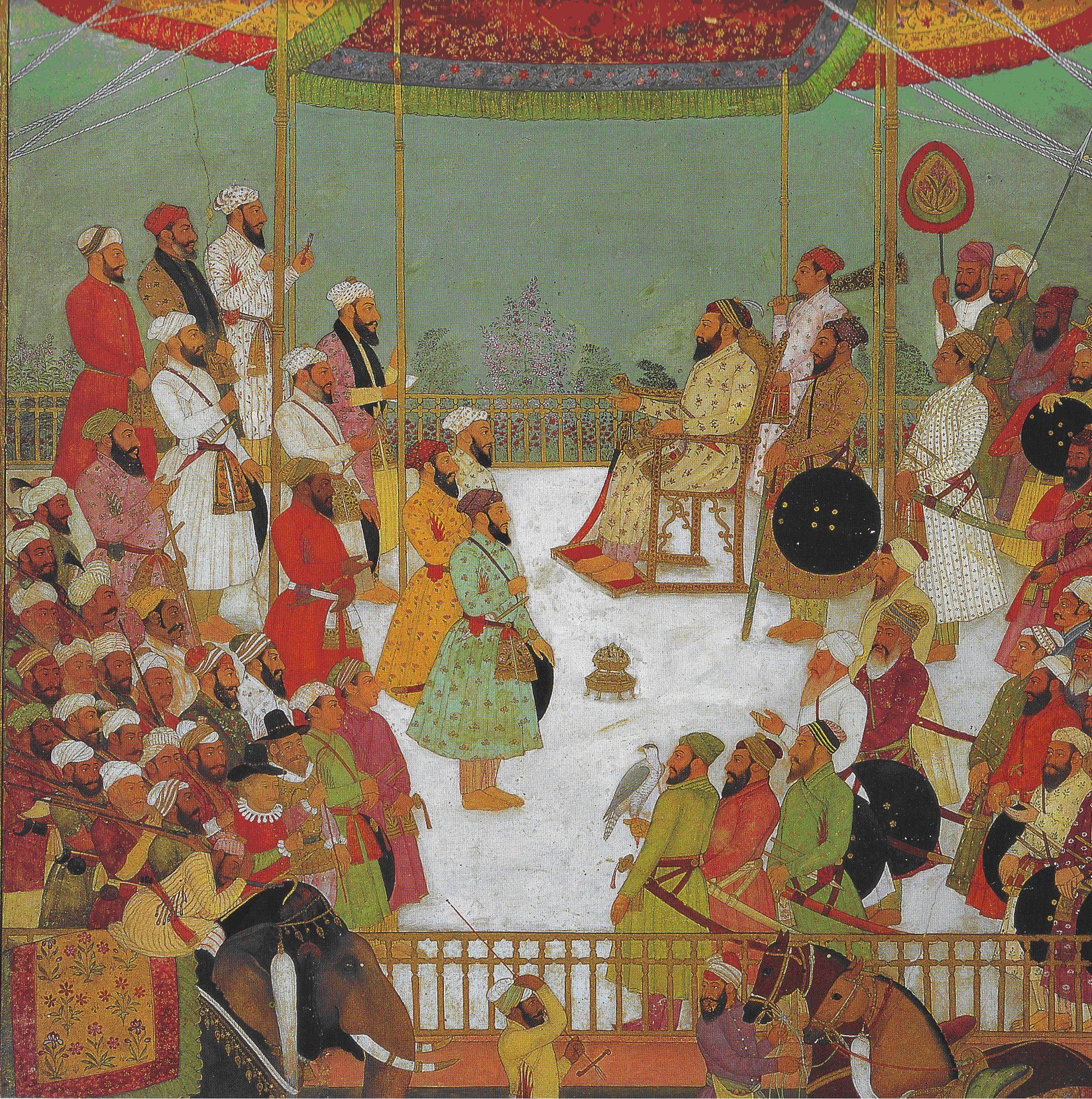
Grand Vizier Saadullah Khan Thahim meeting with his officials

The Thaheem‌ (sometimes spelled "Thahim") is a historical tribe and surname present in the Sindh and Punjab provinces of Pakistan. They are a tribe of Jats and are considered a politically dominant caste in Sindh. The historical tombs of the nobles of the Thaheem tribe martyred during a battle between Kalhoras and Durrani Afghans are situated in Garhi Yasin, Shikarpur District. They are locally called Bohi Quba. In 2023, 15 armed members of the Thaheem tribe attacked a village in Jacobabad in a tribal clash. As of 2019, the chief of the tribe was Sardar Abdul Nabi Khan Thaheem.

== See also ==
- Saadullah Khan Thahim
- Muslim Jats
