= Hifzullah Khan =

Mughal official (died 1701)

Mughal governor of Kashmir
- In office 1686–1690
- Monarch: Aurangzeb
- Preceded by: Ibrahim Khan
- Succeeded by: Muzaffar Khan

Mughal governor of Thatta
- In office 1691–1701
- Preceded by: Abu Nusrat Khan
- Succeeded by: Saeed Khan

Personal details
- Died: 1701 Thatta Subah, Mughal Empire
- Children: Mutawassil Khan; Hifzullah Khan Babar Jang; Talib Muhiuddin Khan; Harz Ullah Khan

Hifzullah Khan, also known as Mian Khan, was a 17th-century noble who was appointed governor of several Mughal provinces during the reign of Aurangzeb Alamgir. He remained the naib subahdar of Lahore, subahdar of Kashmir, and later Sindh, where he died in 1701.

== Career ==
During the tenure of Hifzullah Khan as the governor of Kashmir, the raja of Jammu broke out into open revolt against Mughals. He was reduced to submission by Hifzullah Khan.

== Family ==
Hifzullah Khan was a son of Sa'adullah Khan Chinioti, a Punjabi Muslim noble in the court of Shah Jahan and his grand vizier. His mother was a great-granddaughter of Pir Roshan. His son Mutawassil Khan was married to Nizam ul-Mulk's daughter Khair-un-Nisa Begum, and their son Muzaffar Jung later became Nizam of Hyderabad.

Hifzullah Khan's second son, known as Hifzullah Khan Babr Jang, was the commander of 3,000 with 2,000 horsemen in Hyderabad and the faujdar of Kara. He died childless in 1754. His third son was Talib Muhiuddin Khan Bahadur, who, with his brother Harz Ullah Khan Bahadur had joined Asaf Jah's court. Talib distinguished himself as an administrator, and was appointed the deputy governor of Bijapur. Talib's son Hasan Muhiuddin Khan was also appointed the qiladar of Mahwat.
