= Mallian Kalan =

Mallian Kalan ਮੱਲੀਆਂ ਕੱਲਾਂ
- Village
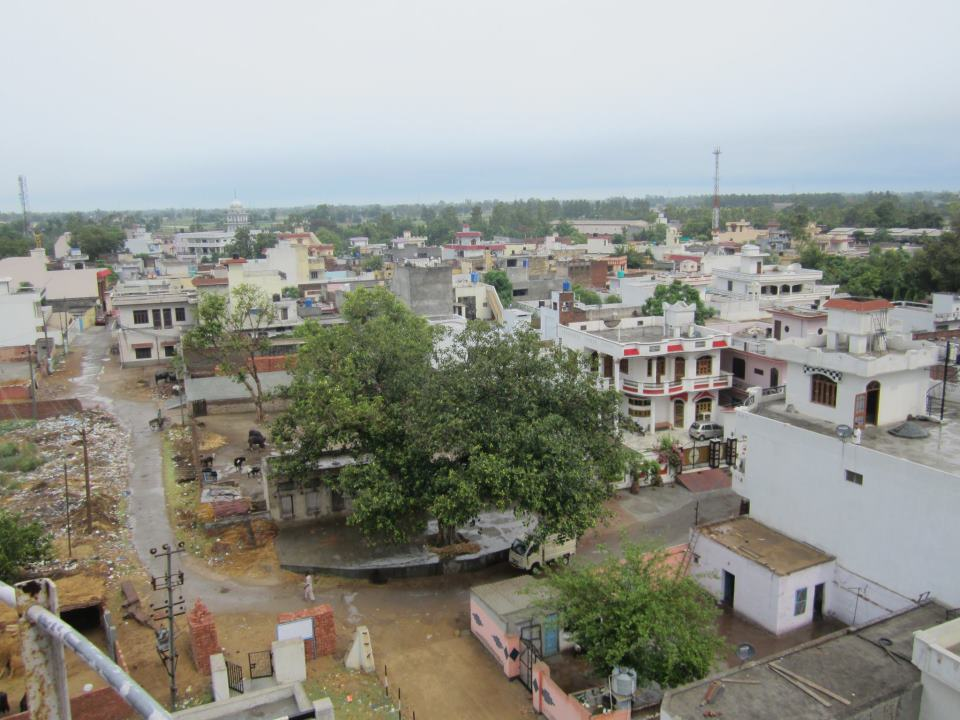
- Mallian Kalan
- Nickname: Mallian
- Location in Punjab, India Mallian Kalan (India)
- Coordinates: 31.1826632°N 75.4123878°E
- Country: India
- State: Punjab
- District: Jalandhar

Government
  - Type: Panchayati raj (India)
  - Body: Gram panchayat
  - Sarpanch: AMARJEET SINGH

Population (2011)
  - Total: 1,400

Languages
  - Official: Punjabi
- Time zone: UTC+5:30 (IST)
- Postal code: 144623

Mallian Kalan (Punjabi: ਮੱਲੀਆਂ ਕੱਲਾਂ, Hindi: मलीयॅा कलां) is a village tehsil Nakodar Jalandhar district in the Indian state of Punjab. Kalan is Persian language word which means Big and Khurd is Persian word which means small when two villages have same name then it is distinguished with Kalan or Khurd. Most of the population are Malhi.

The village is almost 431 km from Delhi, 33 km from Jalandhar 9 km from Nakodar and about 103 km from Amritsar. Surrounding villages include Talwandi Salem, Jahangir, Kang Sahib Rai, Mallian Khurd, Heran, Husainpur, Gill, Nur Pur Chatha, Ugghi and Khanpur Dhadda. The Town is of considerable antiquity and had been held in succession by three different generations and then by the Hindu, traces of whom still exist in the extensive ruins by which the town is surrounded

== Schools in Mallian Kalan ==
- Govt. Sen. Sec School
- Govt. Elementary School

== Popular religious places ==
- Singh Sabha Gurudwara
- Darghaa Baba Sarfree Ji

== Games in the village ==
- Cricket
- Football
- Kabaddi
- Volleyball.
