= Wazir Khan (Lahore) =

Physician and official in Mughal Empire (1560–1641)

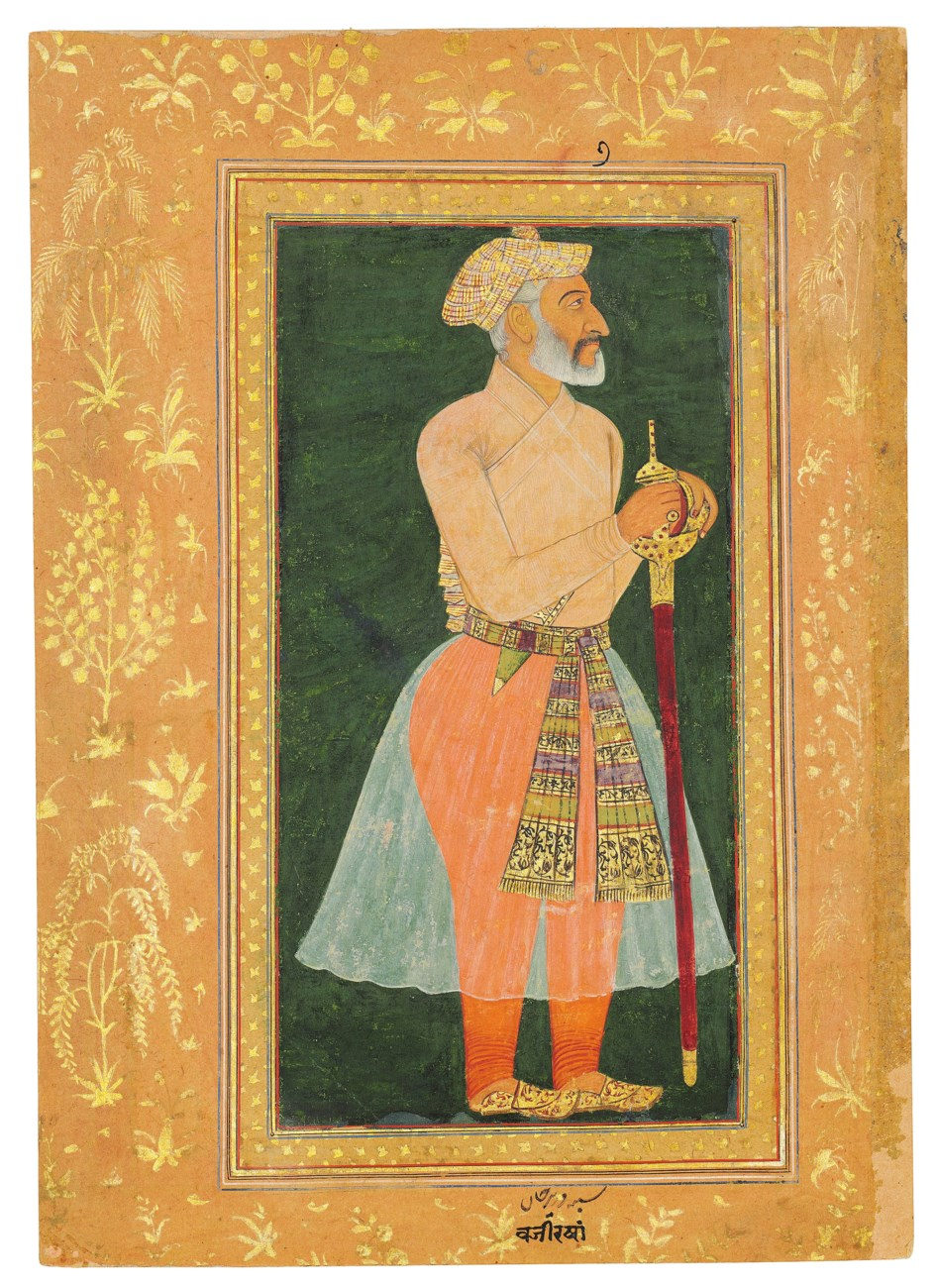

Grand Vizier
- In office 1627–1628
- Preceded by: Abu'l-Hasan Asaf Khan
- Succeeded by: Azam Khan

Subahdar of Agra
- In office 1628 – 1631; 1640–1641
- Preceded by: Qasim Khan
- Succeeded by: Islam Khan

Subahdar of Lahore
- In office 1631–1639
- Preceded by: Abu'l-Hasan Asaf Khan
- Succeeded by: Ali Mardan Khan

Personal details
- Born: Shaikh Ilam-ud-din Ansari c. 1560 Chiniot, Lahore Subah, Mughal Empire
- Died: 1641 (aged 80–81) Agra, Agra Subah, Mughal Empire
- Occupation: Subahdar

Shaikh Ilam-ud-Din Ansari (c. 1560–1641), better known by his royal title Wazir Khan, was a physician and official in the Mughal Empire who was the subahdar of Subah of Lahore during 1631–1639. He was also appointed twice the governor of Agra Subah and held the office of grand vizier for a brief period after the accession of Shah Jahan in 1627/1628.

== Biography ==
Wazir Khan was born in a Punjabi Muslim family hailing from the city of Chiniot in the Lahore Subah. He was a son of Shaikh Abdul Latif bin Shaikh Hisamuddin, a native of Chiniot. During his prime, he expressed his skills in the field of medicine, catching attention and the patronage of Shah Jahan. His medical skills coupled with a understanding of the temperament of Shah Jahan led to his appointment as Superintendent of the Camp Court. Notable for his judicious resolution of conflicts and unwavering integrity, he secured a notable standing in the Prince's regard. His contributions during the campaign against the Rana, notably as the Divan-i-Buyutat, were invaluable, earning him significant promotion within the ranks. During the Prince's stay at Junair, Wazir Khan ascended to the prestigious position of the Divan, marking a significant elevation in his status. At that juncture, only Mahabat Khan held a higher rank among the Prince's retinue. He was later given a command of 7000. He remained Chief Qadi at Lahore for some time.

From 1628 to 1631 he served as the governor of Agra after which he was appointed as the governor of Lahore. He held this post until approximately 1640/1641, when he was reappointed as governor of Agra, but died of colic after only ten months. His son Salah Khan served as Mir Tuzuk in the reign of emperor Aurangzeb, and died in 1694.

== Sikh accounts ==
According to Sikh texts and tradition, Wazir Khan was a supporter of the Sikh community and even a Sikh himself. Sikh tradition says he had been an admirer of Guru Arjan because of the prayer Sukhmani Sahib which is said to have given him relief. After which he had become a Sikh. Thus when Guru Arjan was to be executed by the Mughal emperor he did everything he could to save the Guru, but it was in vain. During the time of Guru Hargobind Wazir Khan kept his support of the Guru. When the Guru was arrested by the emperor Shah Jahan, Wazir Khan begged for the Guru's release. After the first battle between the Sikh and the Mughals Khan convinced Shah Jahan that there wasn't value in taking further action against the Guru. He said, "Sire, the Guru is not a rebel and hath no design on thine empire. He hath ever been the support of the state... Is it not a mircale that with not fully seven hundred men he destroyed an army of seven thousand." Hearing this the emperor was convinced to take no further action against the Guru.

== Architectural works ==
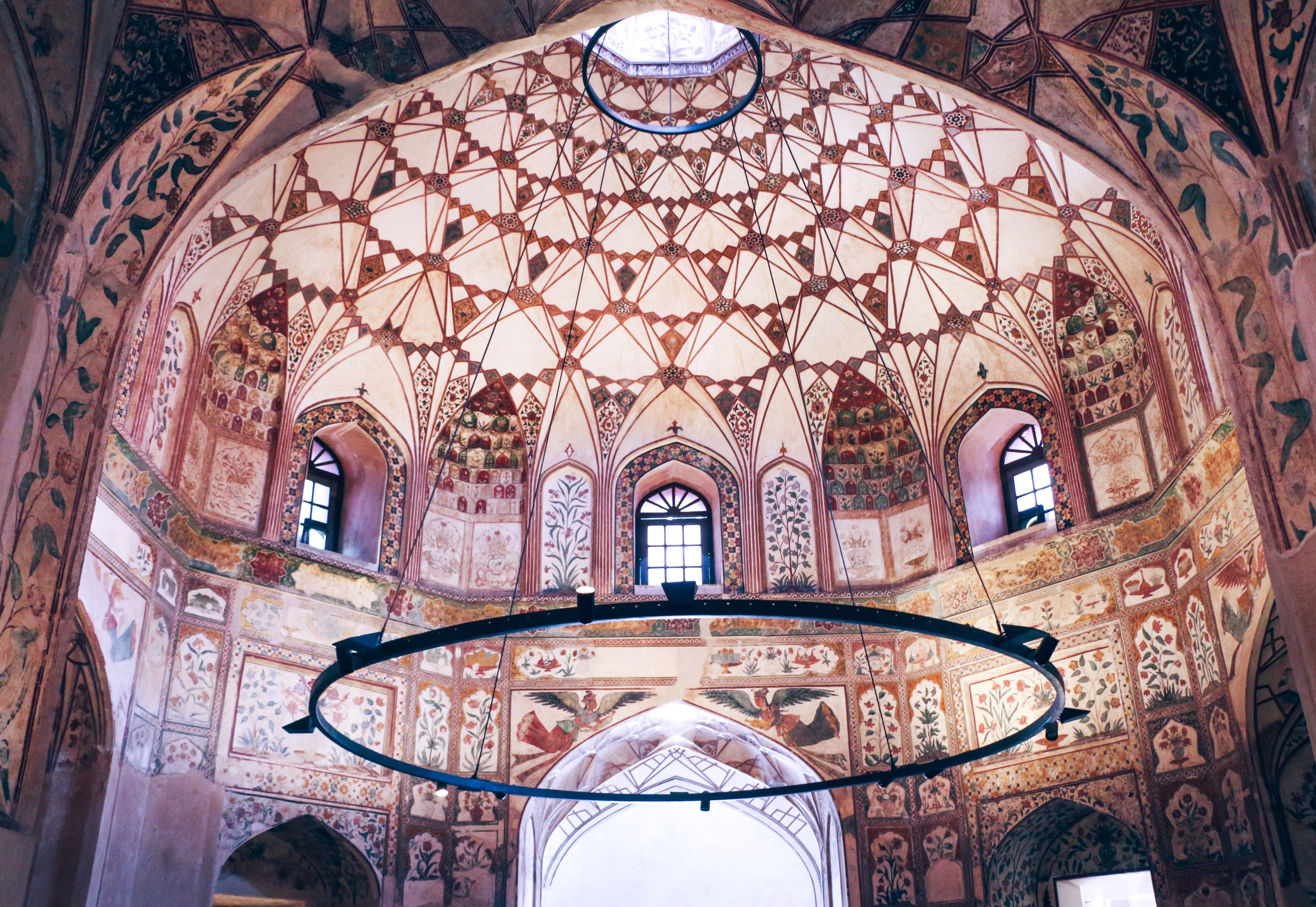
Central dome of the Wazir Khan Hammam

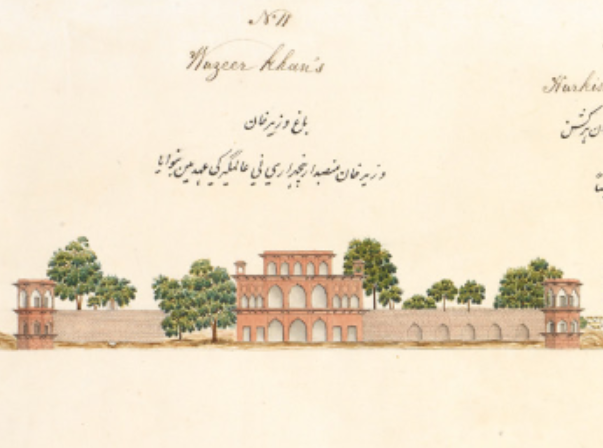
Garden of Wazir Khan, Agra artist, c. 1830

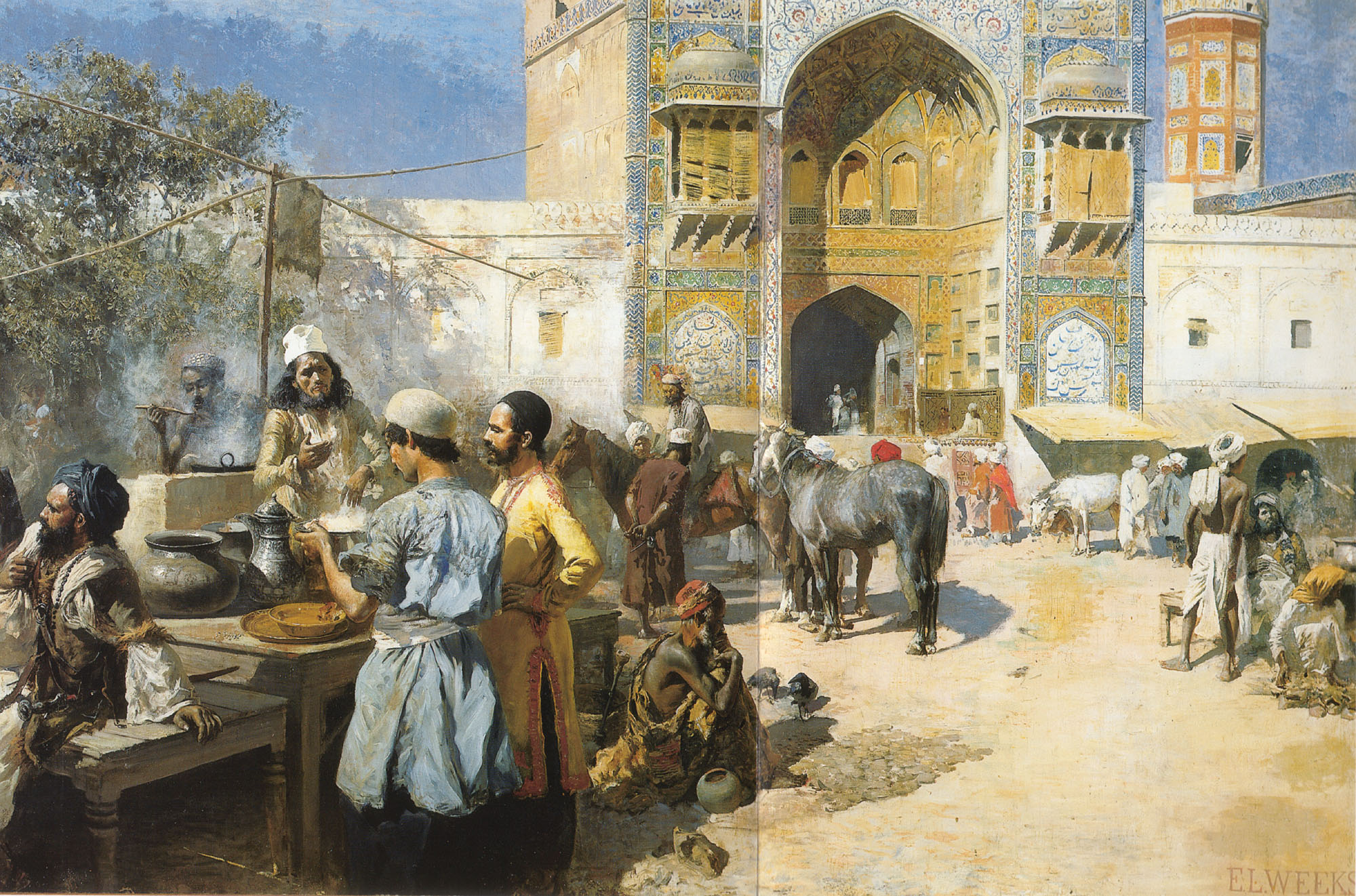
Wazir Khan Mosque in Lahore

Wazir Khan undertook extensive construction projects, including the establishment of baths, markets, and various other edifices in Lahore. In his hometown Chiniot, he erected a strong brick fort alongside other notable structures, and gifted them to the local populace. Wazir Khan was praised by his near contemporary poet Mita Chenabi in his Tuḥfat al-Panjāb for building the Wazir Khan Mosque and founding the city of Wazirabad. He was also responsible for the construction of the Shahi Hammam in Lahore, also known as the Wazir Khan Hammam. He was one of the nobles to build a haveli (mansion) as well as a garden in the city of Agra, where he was twice governor. It is known as the Bagh-i-Wazir Khan. He built another garden in Lahore, known as Nakhlia-i-Wazir Khan, in 1634. Although the garden does not exist any longer, its baradari survived and today serves as the reading room of the Punjab Public Library.
