= Chaumuhan tehsil =

Chaumuha Tehsil
- Tehsil
- Chaumuha Tehsil Location in Uttar Pradesh, India
- Coordinates: 27.620170°N 77.581235°E
- Country: India
- State: Uttar Pradesh
- District: Mathura
- Elevation: 184 m (604 ft)

Population (2011)
  - Total: 13,173

Languages
  - Official: Hindi, English
- Time zone: UTC+5:30 (IST)
- Postal code: 281202
- Telephone code: 05663
- Vehicle registration: UP85 XXXX
- Sub-district code: 09140002
- Website: Tehsil Divas Official Website

Chaumuha Tehsil is a small tehsil in Mathura District of Uttar Pradesh. Its headquarters is Chaumuha town. It belongs to Agra Division. Chaumhha Tehsil is located on National Highway 2 between Kosi Kalan & Mathura. It is 19 km from Mathura.
