= Syed Hassan Murtaza =

Pakistani politician

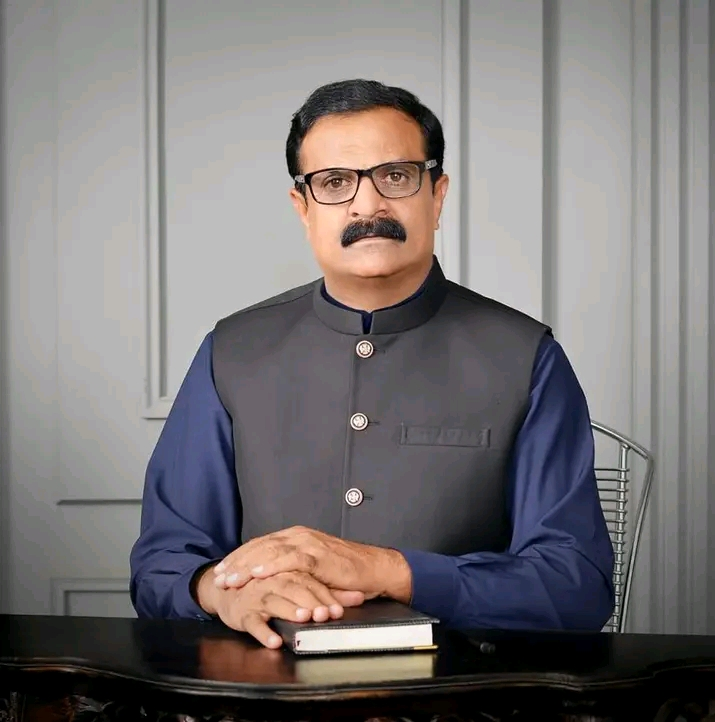

Member of the Provincial Assembly of the Punjab
- In office 15 August 2018 – 14 January 2023
- Constituency: PP-95 Chiniot-III
- In office 9 April 2008 – 20 March 2013
- Constituency: PP-74 (Jhang-II)
- In office 25 November 2002 – 17 November 2007
- Constituency: PP-74 (Jhang-II)

Personal details
- Party: PPP

Syed Hassan Murtaza (Punjabi: سید حسن مُرتضا) is a Pakistani politician who had been a member of the Provincial Assembly of the Punjab from August 2018 till January 2023. He served as the Parliamentary Leader of Pakistan Peoples Party in Punjab.

== Political career ==
He is elected to the Provincial Assembly of the Punjab as a candidate of Pakistan Peoples Party from Constituency PP-95 (Chiniot-III) in the 2018 Punjab Provincial Elections.

He was elected to the Provincial Assembly of the Punjab as a candidate of Pakistan Peoples Party from Constituency PP-74 (Jhang-II) in the 2008 Punjab Provincial Elections.

He was elected to the Provincial Assembly of the Punjab as a candidate of Pakistan Peoples Party from Constituency PP-74 (Jhang-II) in the 2002 Punjab Provincial Elections.

He previously served as a Member of District Council, Jhang during 1991 till 1992 and as Nazim Union Council No.18, Jhang during 2001 until 2002.
