= Muhammad Nawaz (general) =

Pakistani army officer (1957–2011)

Muhammad Nawaz HI(M) Sbt
- محمد نواز
- Born: Muhammad Nawaz; 1 January 1957; Chiniot, Punjab, Pakistan
- Died: 1 June 2011 (aged 54); Layyah, Punjab, Pakistan
- Burial place: Buried in Chak 126 JB, Chiniot (ancestral graveyard) with his son
- Alma mater: Command & Staff College Quetta (MSc War Studies); Iranian Command & Staff College; National Defence College (BS War Studies)
- Children: 4 (one capt Asif Nawaz martyred with him) Ahmed nawaz Amna nawaz Ayesha nawaz
- Relatives: Captain Asif Nawaz (son) Ahmad nawaz (son) (businessman in sharja and Dubai)
- Military career
- Allegiance: Pakistan
- Branch: Pakistan Army
- Service years: 1978–2011
- Rank: Major General
- Nickname: Nawaz
- Service number: PA-19217
- Unit: 14 FF Regiment
- Commands: DG Rangers (Punjab); Commander 31st IND Infantry BRIG; Commander 40th Infantry Div. (Okara); Instructor Command & Staff College; Instructor School of Armour & MW; Deputy DG ISI; Defense & Army Attaché at PAK Embassy Tehran; Staff Officer HQ MODA (Saudi Arabia); BRIG Major 44th Light Infantry Div.
- Conflicts: Operation al-Mizan; Siachen Offense; Indo-Pakistani War of 1999
- Awards: Hilal-i-Imtiaz (Military); Sitara-e-Basalat

Muhammad Nawaz HI(M) Sbt (Urdu: محمد نواز; 1 January 1957 – 1 June 2011) was a two star general officer of the Pakistan Army.

== Personal life ==
He was married and had two daughters and one son.

== Military career ==
Nawaz was accepted into the Pakistan Military Academy (PMA) in 1978 into the 61st PMA Long Course. After successfully completing his military training, he was commissioned into the Pakistan Army on 27 March 1980 and was inducted into the 14 Frontier Force Regiment. He obtained his BSc in War Studies from the Command and Staff College and his MSc degree in War Studies from the National Defence University, Islamabad.

As well as active service with his own unit Regiment 14 FF, he served as DG Rangers (Punjab), Commander 31st Independent Infantry Brigade, Commander 40th Infantry Division Okara, Instructor at Command & Staff College Quetta and School of Armour & Mechanized Warfare, Deputy Director General ISI, Defense & Army Attaché at PAK Embassy in Tehran, and Staff Officer at the Headquarters of the Ministry of Defense of Saudi Arabia

He was promoted to the rank of Major general on 8 August 2008. After this promotion he was posted as a general officer commanding the 40th Infantry Division, Okara, and later on as director general of the Punjab Rangers.

== Death ==
While he was on duty traveling to meet with troops of the Pakistan Rangers, the helicopter he was in crashed in the Indus River due to bad weather. Nawaz, along with the rest of the crew, died on impact. Among the crew was his son Capt Asif Nawaz, Pilot Lieutenant Colonel Syed Amir Abbas, and Airman/Technician Subedar Abadullah. Nawaz was buried with his son in his home town, Chak 126 JB in Chiniot, with full military honours.
