= Mohammad Nawaz (cricketer, born 1974) =

Pakistani cricketer (born 1974)

Personal information
- Born: 3 October 1974 (age 52); Faisalabad, Pakistan
- Batting: Right-handed
- Bowling: Right arm off-break
- Source: Cricinfo, 1 March 2016

Mohammad Nawaz (3 October 1974) is a Pakistani former first-class cricketer who played for Sargodha and Hyderabad cricket teams. He played 51 first-class and 27 List-A cricket matches.
