= Sa'adullah Khan Chinioti =

Mughal Grand Vizier (1591–1656)

Sa'adullah Khan
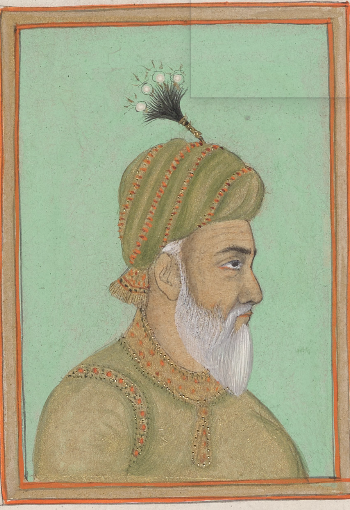
- Bust Portrait of Saadullah Khan c.16–17th century

Grand Vizier
- In office 1645 – April 1656
- Monarch: Shah Jahan I
- Preceded by: Islam Khan Mashadi
- Succeeded by: Mir Jumla II

Personal details
- Born: c. 1591 Chiniot, Lahore Subah, Mughal Empire (present-day Punjab, Pakistan)
- Died: April 1656 (aged 65–66) Delhi, Delhi Subah, Mughal Empire
- Relations: Amir Bakhsh (father); Ghazi ud-Din Khan (son-in-law)
- Children: Hifzullah Khan; Lutfullah Khan; Safiya Khanum

Military service
- Branch/service: Mughal Army
- Years of service: 1645–1656
- Battles/wars: Balkh campaign (1646–1647); Kandahar campaign (1649–1653)

Sa'adullah Khan Chinioti, also known as Allami Sadullah Khan (c. 1591 – April 1656), was a scholar and official in the Mughal Empire. He served as the grand vizier and Vakil-i-Mutlaq of Shah Jahan from 1645 until his death in 1656.

== Biography ==
Sa'adullah Khan was born in 1591 at Chiniot, Lahore Subah, into a Muslim Punjabi Jat family from the Thahim clan. His father Amir Bakhsh was a cultivator by profession.

In his youth Sa'adullah Khan went to study at Lahore under Shaykh Kamal al-Din, a well-known scholar who had had intellectuals like Abdul Hakim Sialkoti and Ahmad Sirhindi as his pupils, among others. For a while he taught at the madrasa of Wazir Khan at Lahore and later went to Delhi, where he became tutor of children of Abu'l-Hasan Asaf Khan.

Sa'adullah Khan first entered in the Mughal bureaucracy in December 1641 on the recommendation of the Sadr-us-sudur Musavi Khan; an allowance was fixed for him and he was given a robe and a horse. Soon he was appointed as the arz-i-mukarrar and was given the mansab of 1000 zat and 200 sowar (1000/200). After serving for a short period in this post he was given the post of darogha-i-daulat khana-i-khas (superintendent of royal apartments) and rewarded with the title of Khan. In 1643 his rank was increased to 1500/300. In the same year he was made the Mir-i-Saman, a minister of great importance, second only to the Wazir. In 1645 Sa'adullah was granted the post of Diwan-i-Khalisa; he was also given the charge of drafting royal orders, with a mansab of 4000/1000. He worked for 46 days in this position before being appointed as the Grand Vizier, with his mansab ultimately reaching 7000/7000. Sa'adullah Khan would remain the Grand Vizier until his death in 1656.

=== Prime Minister ===
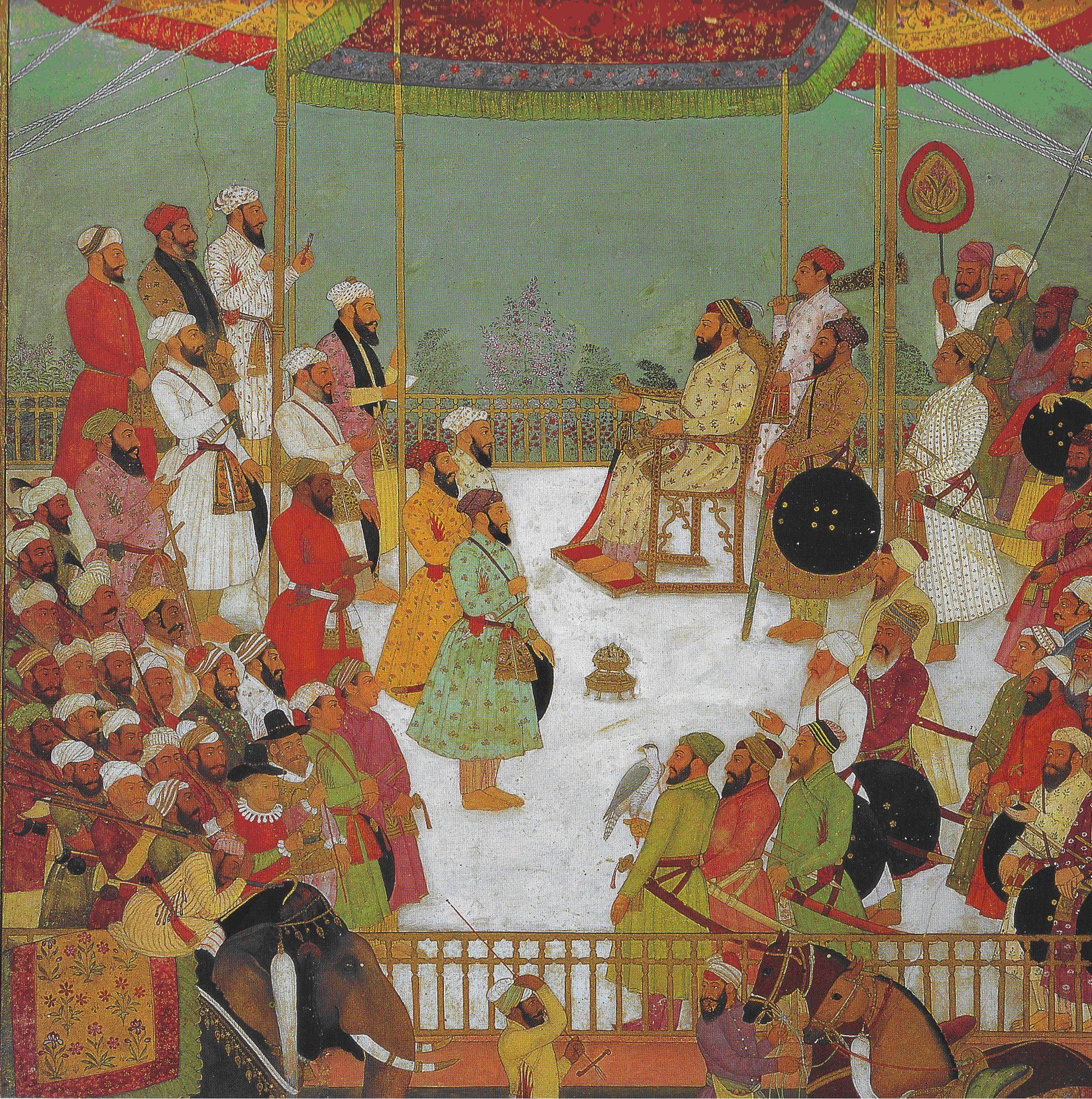
Sadullah Khan meeting his officials c.1655

In the year 1645, the incumbent prime minister Islam Khan was made to vacate his position and take up governorship in the Deccan region by Shah Jahan. By this time, Sa'adullah Khan had become widely respected for his intelligence and talent, which had enabled his ascent in the Mughal administration despite a lack of political or family connections. He was appointed as the new Prime Minister.

A year after his appointment, Sa'adullah Khan handled administrative issues regarding Shah Jahan's Balkh and Badakhshan campaigns. Sa'adullah Khan was sent to Balkh to manage the country and make the revenue settlements. Prince Murad Baksh was relieved of his command while Vizier Sa'adullah only took 22 days to settle the administrative affairs and returned to Kabul. He was subsequently rewarded with a khilat and an increase of 1000 in his mansab for managing the situation efficiently and saving the Mughals from a disaster in Balkh region. From 1649 to 1653 Sa'adullah Khan was involved in the year-long sieges of Kandahar along with prince Aurangzeb. In 1654, he laid siege to the Chittor Fort in Mewar upon the royal orders, in response to provocations from Raj Singh I.

Sa'adullah Khan was considered among the four most powerful mughal nobles during Shah Jahan's rule. He held the rank of 7,000 zat and 7,000 sowar under his command, the highest of any non-royal.

== European accounts ==
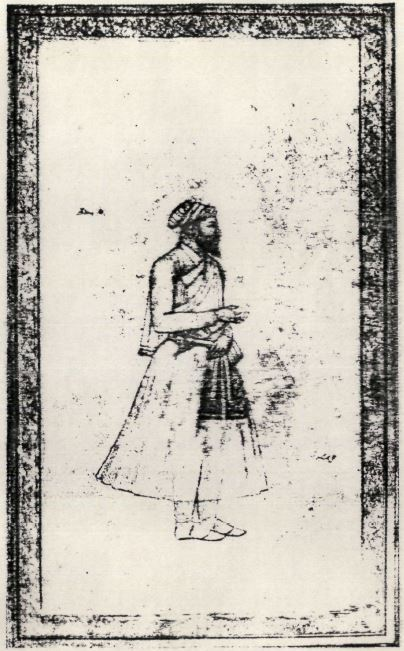
Miniature painting of Sadullah Khan

First-hand accounts of European travelers visiting the Mughal court have praised Sa'adullah Khan. He has been described as a "man esteemed by the king and the whole court" by the Italian traveler Nicolas Manucci, who also relates the events of the rebellion of the Bundela Rajputs which was successfully put down by Sa'adullah Khan. Francois Berner, a French physician and traveller noted that the Mughals considered Sa'adullah Khan to be the most accomplished statesman in all of Asia, his closeness to the Emperor Shah Jahan is mentioned in the work Travels in the Mogul Empire. A Dutch envoy Joan Tack accused him of harboring an inherent hostility toward Europeans, notably citing his role in expelling the Portuguese from Bengal. He labeled Sa'adullah Khan a "hereditary enemy of Christians" and portrayed him as a symbol of Mughal despotism. In this portrayal, Sa'adullah Khan is cast as the de facto ruler of the empire, wielding near-autocratic control over its political machinery, symbolizing the centralized authority of the Mughal state.

== Family ==
Sa'adullah Khan had married the daughter of Karimdad Ansari, who was a son of Pir Jalaluddin and a grandson of Bayazid Ansari. His two sons Lutfullah Khan and Hifzullah Khan were appointed to high positions during Aurangzeb's reign, while his daughter Safiya Khanum was married to Ghazi ud-Din Khan, another prominent noble.

== Death ==
Sa'adullah Khan served as prime minister of the Mughal Empire until his death in April 1656. His passing was widely mourned within the Mughal court, including by Emperor Shah Jahan, who issued a public eulogy announcing his death.

== Works and legacy ==
Sa'adullah Khan's reputation as a administrator endured for generations. His accomplishments were stated to be a source of honour for Punjabis by his near contemporary poet Mita Chenabi in his Tuḥfat al-Panjāb. He has been called as the best of the Mughal grand viziers by Ibn Hasan. According to an anecdote from the reign of Emperor Bahadur Shah I (1707–1712), Aurangzeb's successor, when a later vizier, Hidayatullah Khan Kashmiri, sought the prestigious title of Sa'adullah Khan, the emperor replied that it was "not easy to be a Sa'adullah Khan, let him be known as Sa'idullah Khan".

A collection of his letters was edited and published by the University of the Punjab in 1968. Sa'adullah Khan established the town of Sadabad in India and is also credited with the construction of Shahi Mosque in his hometown, Chiniot.
