= Saqib Khan Chadhar =

Pakistani politician

Member of the Provincial Assembly of the Punjab
- Incumbent
- Assumed office 24 February 2024
- Constituency: PP-97 Chiniot-IV

Personal details
- Born: Muhammad Ali Saqib Khan; June 6, 1990 (age 36) Mangeni, Bhawana Tehsil
- Citizenship: Pakistani
- Party: PMLN (2024-present)
- Spouses: Mehreen Khan; Sumaira Chadhar
- Occupation: Agriculturist, Politician, Businessman

Muhammad Saqib Khan Chadhar is a Pakistani politician and a Member of Provincial Assembly of the Punjab (MPA). He was elected as an independent candidate in 2024 and joined the Pakistan Muslim League (N).

== Early life ==
Chadhar was born on 6 June 1990 in Mangeni, Bhawana Tehsil to Muhammad Altaf Khan, a landlord.

== Political career ==
After a heat-up campaign in the constituency PP-97 Chiniot-IV in February 2024, Chadhar was elected to the Provincial Assembly of the Punjab as an independent candidate in the 2024 Pakistani general election. He received 42,959 votes and defeated both of the former members Saqlain Anwar Sipra, a candidate of Pakistan Muslim League (N) (PML-N), and Saleem Bibi Bharwana, a candidate of Pakistan Tehreek-e-Insaf (PTI).

On 11 February, it was officially announced that all three independent elected members of the Provincial Assembly of the Punjab from the different constituencies of Chiniot district, including Chadhar, have joined the PML-N party after meeting with the party President, Shehbaz Sharif.
