= NA-94 Chiniot-II =

Constituency of the National Assembly of Pakistan

- Constituency for the National Assembly of Pakistan
- Region: Chiniot Tehsil and Bhawana Tehsil (partly) of Chiniot District
- Electorate: 447,538

Current constituency
- Party: Pakistan Muslim League (N)
- Member: Qaiser Ahmed Sheikh
- Created from: NA-86 Jhang-I; NA-87 Jhang-II

NA-94 Chiniot-II (این اے-94، چنیوٹ-2) is a constituency for the National Assembly of Pakistan. It comprises Chiniot Tehsil and some areas of Bhowana Tehsil. The constituency was formally known as NA-86 (Jhang-I) before the 2018 delimitations. The creation of Chiniot District in 2009 from areas previously included in Jhang District mandated this change in nomenclature.

== Members of Parliament ==
=== 2018–2023: NA-100 Chiniot-II ===
Election	Member	Party
2018	Qaiser Ahmed Sheikh	PML (N)

=== 2024–present: NA-94 Chiniot-II ===
Election	Member	Party
2024	Qaiser Ahmed Sheikh	PML (N)

== Election 2002 ==
General elections were held on 10 October 2002. Muhammad Tahir Shah of PML-Q won by 53,639 votes.

General election 2002: NA-86 Jhang-I
Party	Candidate	Votes	%	±%
PML(Q)	Muhammad Tahir Shah	53,639	42.33	
TI	Qaiser Ahmed Sheikh	40,888	32.27	
MMA	Maulana Muhammad Rehmat Ullah	29,336	23.15	
Others	Others (three candidates)	2,843	2.25	
Turnout		130,216	51.61	
Total valid votes		126,706	97.30	
Rejected ballots		3,510	2.70	
Majority		12,751	10.06	
Registered electors		252,313		

== Election 2008 ==
General elections were held on 18 February 2008. Syed Anayat Ali Shah of Pakistan Peoples Party Parliamentarian (PPPP) won by 57,583 votes.

General election 2008: NA-86 Jhang-I
Party	Candidate	Votes	%	±%
PPP	Syed Anayat Ali Shah	57,583	41.52	
PML(Q)	Muhammad Tahir Shah	40,829	29.44	
Independent	Qaiser Ahmed Sheikh	39,605	28.56	
Independent	Muhammad Ashraf Khan Chadhar	669	0.48	
Turnout		138,686	45.14	
Total valid votes		138,686	100	
Rejected ballots		0	0	
Majority		16,754	12.08	
Registered electors		307,209		
PPP gain from PML(Q)				

== Election 2013 ==
General elections were held on 11 May 2013. Qaiser Ahmed Shaikh of PML (N) won by 77,512 votes and became the member of National Assembly.

General election 2013: NA-86 Jhang-I
Party	Candidate	Votes	%	±%
PML(N)	Qaiser Ahmed Sheikh	77,908	43.26	
PPP	Zulfiqar Ali Shah	46,917	26.05	
PTI	Syed Anayat Ali Shah	25,256	14.02	
Independent	Sheikh Kaiser Mehmood	19,257	10.69	
Others	Others (twelve candidates)	10,746	5.98	
Turnout		185,911	64.26	
Total valid votes		180,084	96.87	
Rejected ballots		5,827	3.13	
Majority		30,991	17.21	
Registered electors		289,317		
PML(N) gain from PPP				

== Election 2018 ==
General elections were held on 25 July 2018.

General election 2018: NA-100 Chiniot-II
Party	Candidate	Votes	%	±%
PML(N)	Qaiser Ahmed Sheikh	76,415	34.16	
PTI	Zulfiqar Ali Shah	75,559	33.78	
PPP	Syed Anayat Ali Shah	40,542	18.12	
Others	Others (ten candidates)	23,971	10.72	
Turnout		223,684	61.68	
Rejected ballots		7,197	3.22	
Majority		856	0.38	
Registered electors		362,673		
PML(N) hold		Swing	N/A	

== Election 2024 ==
General elections were held on 8 February 2024. Qaiser Ahmed Sheikh won the election with 79,623 votes.

General election 2024: NA-94 Chiniot-II
Party	Candidate	Votes	%	±%
PML(N)	Qaiser Ahmed Sheikh	79,623	32.02	▼2.14
PTI	Muhammad Khalid (Note: Filed nomination papers as PTI candidate but ECP allowed him to run as an Independent)	72,476	29.14	▼4.64
PPP	Syed Anayat Ali Shah	69,452	27.93	▲9.81
TLP	Rehmat Ullah	13,772	5.54	▲2.42
Others	Others (seventeen candidates)	13,355	5.37	
Turnout		256,483	57.31	▼4.37
Total valid votes		248,678	96.96	
Rejected ballots		7,805	3.04	
Majority		7,147	2.87	▲2.49
Registered electors		447,538		
PML(N) hold		Swing	N/A	

== See also ==
- NA-93 Chiniot-I
- NA-95 Faisalabad-I
