= PP-97 Chiniot-IV =

Constituency of the Punjabi Provincial Legislature, Pakistan

- Constituency for the Provincial Assembly of Punjab
- Region: Lalian Tehsil (partly) and Bhawana Tehsil (partly) including Bhawana city of Chiniot District

Current constituency
- Created from: PP-75 Jhang-III (2002-2018); PP-96 Chiniot-IV (2018-2023)

PP-97 Chiniot-IV (پی پی-97، چنيوٹ-4) is a Constituency of Provincial Assembly of Punjab. It includes the regions of Lalian Tehsil (partly) and Bhawana Tehsil (partly) including Bhawana city of Chiniot District.

== General elections 2024 ==
Provincial election 2024: PP-97 Chiniot-IV
Party	Candidate	Votes	%	±%
Independent	Muhammad Saqib Khan	42,976	35.57	
PML(N)	Muhammad Saqlain Anwar	37,759	31.25	
Independent	Saleem Bibi (Note: Filed nomination papers as PTI candidate but ECP allowed him to run as an Independent)	31,433	26.02	
TLP	Muhammad Sarfraz	2,692	2.23	
Independent	Ali Humayon Sipra	2,370	1.96	
Others	Others (twelve candidates)	3,583	2.97	
Turnout		125,552	60.86	
Total valid votes		120,813	96.23	
Rejected ballots		4,738	3.77	
Majority		5,217	4.32	
Registered electors		206,286		
hold				

== General elections 2018 ==
In 2018, the constituency was PP-96 Chiniot-IV. Saleem Bibi Bharwana was elected to the Provincial Assembly of the Punjab as a candidate of the Pakistan Tehreek-e-Insaf (PTI).

Provincial election 2018: PP-96 Chiniot-IV
Party	Candidate	Votes	%	±%
PTI	Saleem Bibi	29,738	26.90	
PML(N)	Muhammad Saqlain Anwar	26,474	23.95	
Independent	Mukhtar Anmad	20,552	18.59	
Independent	Qamar Abbas Chadhar	6,411	5.80	
PPP	Muhammad Aurangzaib	6,247	5.65	
Independent	ijaz Hussain	6,115	5.53	
PNML	Ali Hamayon Sipra	4,071	3.68	
TLP	Bakhtiar Anmed Khan	3,183	2.88	
Independent	Saqlain Nawaz	2,067	1.87	
Independent	Zulfiqar Ali	1,658	1.50	
Independent	Imtiaz Ahmad Lali	1,306	1.18	
MMA	Abdul Qayyum	1,206	1.09	
Others	Others (four candidates)	1,517	1.38	
Turnout		115,548	61.94	
Total valid votes		110,545	95.67	
Rejected ballots		5,003	4.33	
Majority		3,264	2.95	
Registered electors		186,557		

== General elections 2013 ==
In 2013, the constituency was PP-75 (Jhang-III). Imtiaz Ahmad Lali was elected to the Provincial Assembly of the Punjab as a candidate of the Pakistan Muslim League (N).

Provincial election 2013: PP-75 Jhang-III
Party	Candidate	Votes	%	±%
PML(N)	Imtiaz Ahmad Lali	54,764	58.89	
Independent	Malik Ghulam Abbas Nissoana	28,298	30.43	
PTI	Hina Anwar Makhdoom	4,085	4.39	
Independent	Syed Zahid Hussain IND	3,573	3.84	
Independent	Qari Shabbir Ahmad Usmani	1,139	1.22	
Others	Others (seven candidates)	1,128	1.21	
Turnout		96,425	52.85	
Total valid votes		92,987	96.43	
Rejected ballots		3,438	3.57	
Majority		26,466	28.46	
Registered electors		182,439		

== General elections 2008 ==
In 2013, the constituency was PP-75 (Jhang-III). Saqlain Anwar Sipra was elected to the Provincial Assembly of the Punjab as a candidate of the Pakistan Muslim League (N).

Contesting candidates	Party affiliation	Votes polled
Saqlain Anwar Sipra	Pakistan Muslim League (Q)	24,298
Mehar Muhammad Nawaz	Independent	21,296
Muhammad Sarfaraz Khan Jappa	Pakistan Peoples Party	19,916

== See also ==
- PP-96 Chiniot-III
- PP-98 Faisalabad-I
