= Sheikhan, Pakistan =

Town in Punjab, Pakistan

Sheikhan
- Town
- Location within Pakistan
- Coordinates: 31.60°N 72.46°E
- Country: Pakistan
- Province: Punjab
- Elevation: 152 m (499 ft)

Population (2017 Census of Pakistan)
  - Total: 556,147 (Chiniot Tehsil population)
- Time zone: UTC+5 (PST)

Sheikhan (Punjabi and Urdu: شیخن) is a town in the Tehsil and District Chiniot in Punjab province of Pakistan.

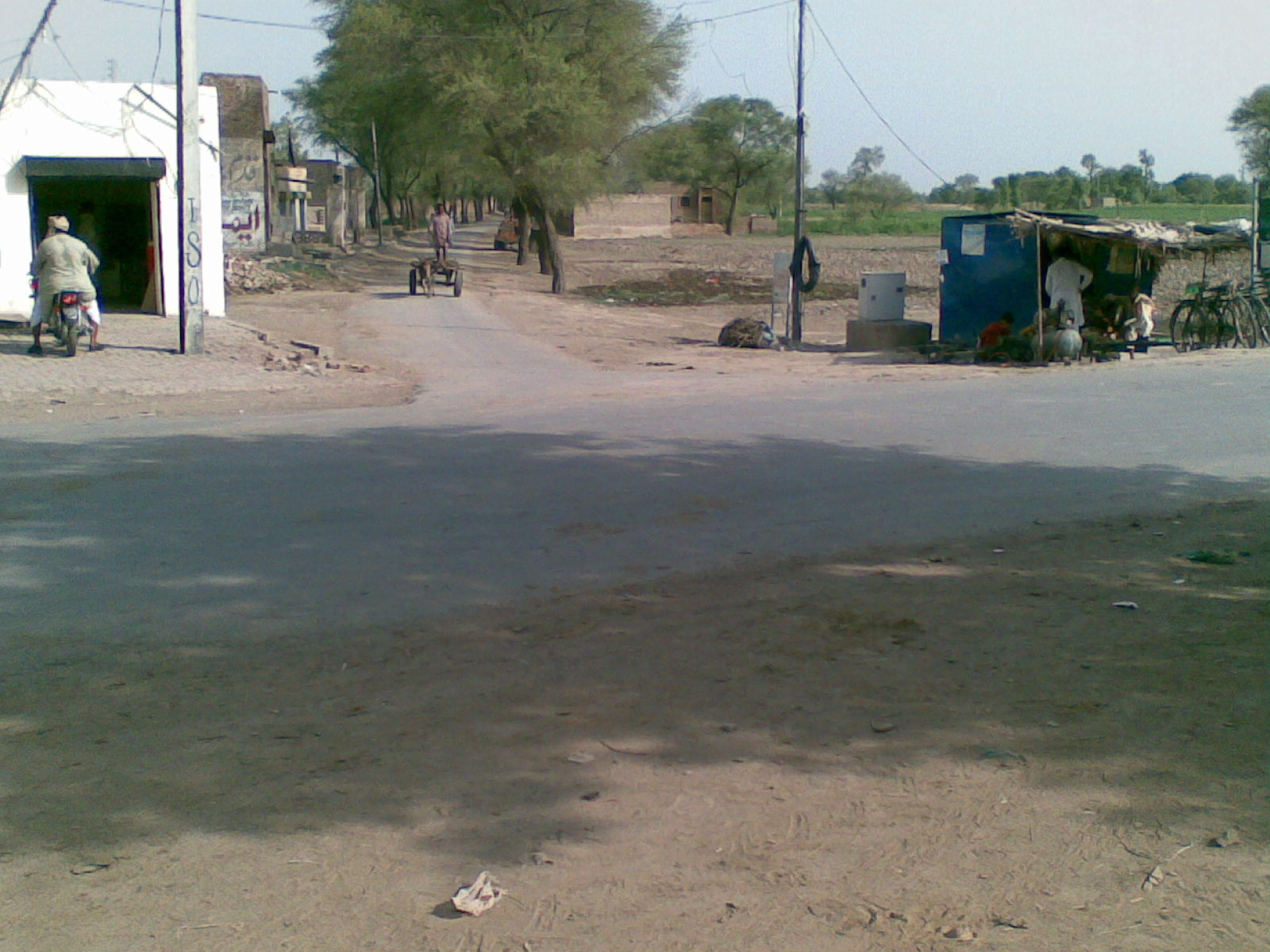
Ali Chowk Adda Sheikhan. The road heading towards Sheikhan Village.

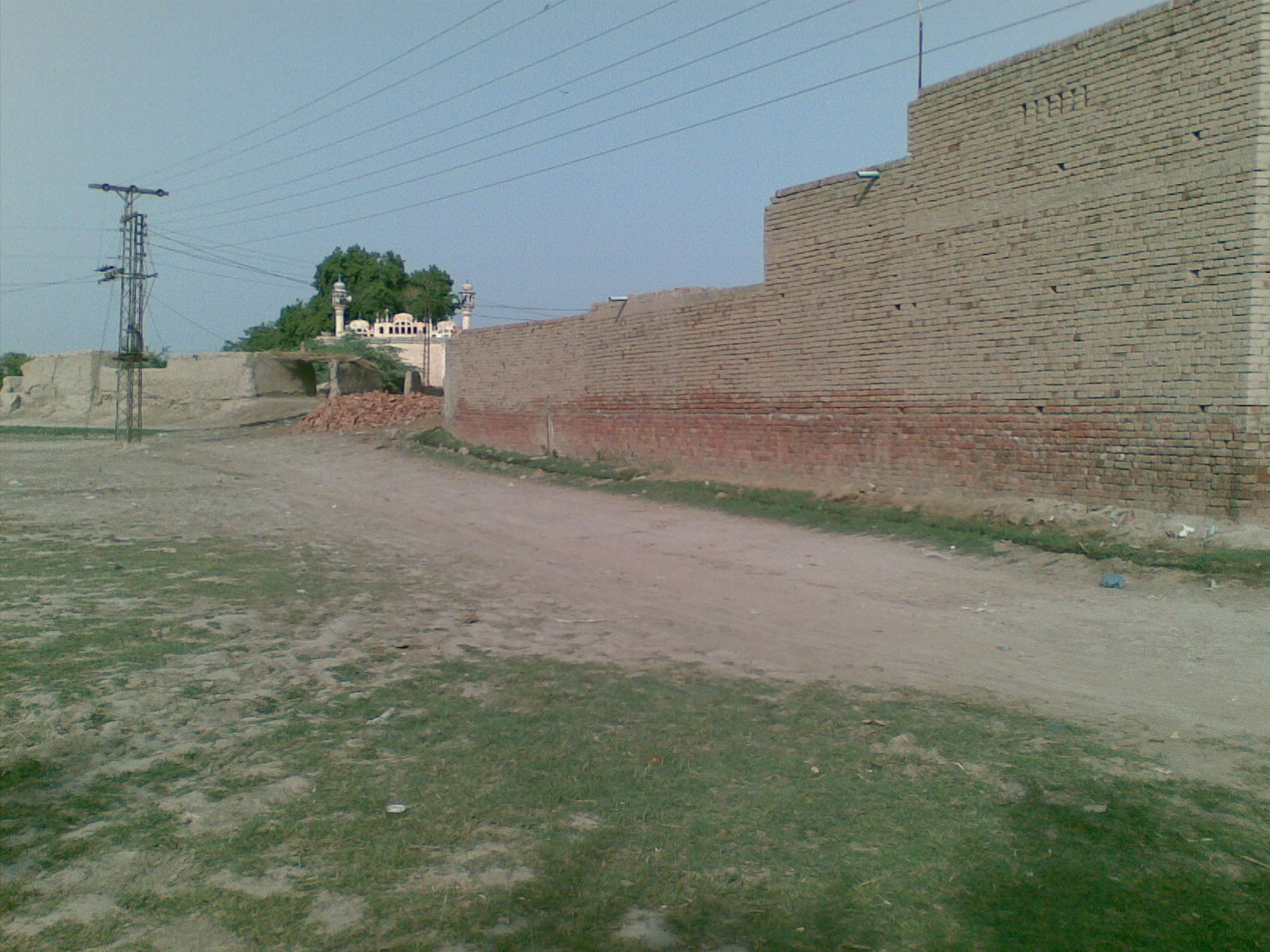
Beside the graveyard near Malang Morr in Sheikhan

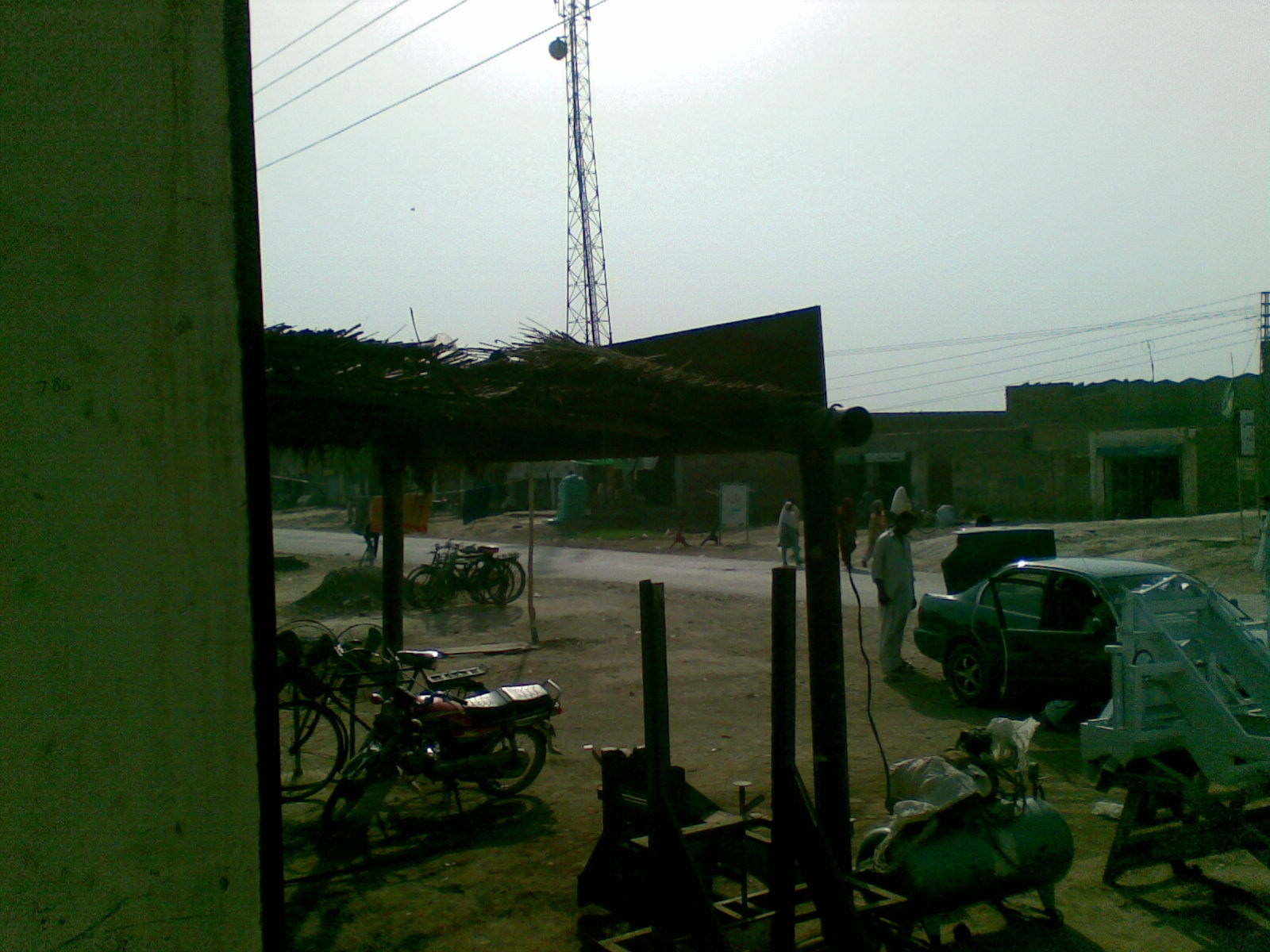
North side of Adda Sheikhan, a view opposite Old Habib Bank Branch at Lalian-Jahng road.

Until 2009, new Chiniot District was not formed by the government and Chiniot Tehsil was part of Jhang District.

== Geography ==
=== Southern side ===
The village Sheikhan is situated some distance 2.5 kilometres (1.6 mi) from the right bank of the river Chenab (Chanhan) in the Utar region which flows in the southeast of the village. A rain pond (talaab) is also located a half-mile from the village on the southern side, called Sangar.

=== Northern side ===
On the north side, a canal flowing from the river Jhelum (Vehat) provides water to village lands for cultivation. Most of the population lives in old villages, while a colony was also settled by former prime minister Zulfikar Ali Bhutto in the 1970s for non-landowners. A number of the population also lives on the north side crossing the canal after the development of a link road between Jhang and Lalian, which is called Adda Sheikhan.

=== Adjoining villages ===
Bhawana is just 28 kilometres (17 mi) from Sheikhan. Adjoining villages to the west are Ratta Matta.

== Vegetation ==
Being an agricultural area, most of the land is ploughed but uncultivated/barren land is still found, especially near the riverbanks. Different kinds of trees, grasses and shrubs are found here.

=== Trees ===
Kikar, talhi, jand, pippal, bohar, vann.

=== Shrubs ===
Karil, akk, etc.

=== Grasses ===
Lunak, dhaman, etc.

=== Herbs ===
Hermal

== Area politicians ==
- Saqlain Anwar Sipra, Member Profile, Provincial Assembly of Punjab (constituency PP-76 Chiniot-IV-Cum Jhang) (2013–2018)
