= Mouza Talib =

- Village
- Location within Pakistan
- Coordinates: 31.29°N 72.50°E
- Country: Pakistan
- Province: Punjab
- District: Chiniot
- Time zone: UTC+5 (PST)

Mouza Talib is a village in District Chiniot, Punjab, Pakistan. Located on Chak Jhumra Road, it is Chiniot Tehsil's Union Council # 13 and 8 km away from Faisalabad-Pindi Bhattian Motorway's (M3) Sahianwala Interchange. Its latitude is 31° 41' 28.08"N, and longitude is 73° 0' 59.49"E. Via M3, Talib is 140 kilometers from Lahore and 30 kilometers from Faisalabad. Nearby towns are Chak Jhumra, Chiniot, Sargodha, Lalian, Bhawana, Rabwah (Chenab Nagar), Faisalabad and Pindi Bhattian. By road, Talib is connected to Barnala, Chak Jhumra, and Chiniot. The most famous things in Talib are Darbar Baba gard Ali, Canal Bridge, Government Primary school for Boys Girls and Government Middle school for girls.

== Before 1947 ==
Mouza Talib' was inhabited by two young men from the Khokhar clan during Raja Ranjit Singh's rule over Punjab, they got married in a nearby locality and the population rose in the following years. Before the independence of Pakistan in 1947 era when India was a British colony Hindu Khatri were also living in the village and most of them were land lords with control over business and agriculture, and their terms with the Muslim community were not good, for instance, Muslims had to slaughter cows or bulls on their marriages by ensuring Hindus were out of sight to avoid any possible fight.

== Independence of 1947 ==
On 14–15 August 1947, Pakistan and India came into being respectively. Those Hindu Khatris migrated to India, leaving behind their property both (residential and agricultural) and it went into the hands of local Muslims, mainly Khokha's and Harals. The Government of Pakistan asked them to leave this village in advance for the migrants they were expecting to pound in from India, and offered them to possess a newly allocated village, Khichian, near Brnala, but they declined to do so and consequently had to leave agricultural lands for the migrants, mainly Gujjars and Arain. By this time the previous offer by the Government for a new village also lapsed. So the locals once again became dependent.

== After 1947 ==
The immigrants and locals could not be adjusted on the go and developed some sort of enmity because of clashes in customs, language and wealth level, but the locals went on working hard in the later years, while others mainly Gujjars were enjoying the pleasures of life; this slowly but steadily changed the ultimate uphold of lands in favour of locals.

== Castes ==
This village consists of four major families

- Khokhar
- Gujjar,
- Haral, and
- Arain

other supporting castes include

- Kumar
- Nai
- Tarkhan
- Muslim Shaikh
- Lohar
- Machi
- Awan
- Aasi
- Changur
- Miraci
- Badher
- Tarrar

== Facilities ==
This multi-ethnic population numbers near 7000 and much of this population is illiterate, and conditions of public facilities are poor. A Civil hospital exists three kilometers away from the main population area. Water sanitation and drainage are the burning issues these days.

== Economy ==
The economy is meager and agricultural mostly. Some people are Government employees. A canal from Jhang Branch passes through the village. Irrigation water for land comes from this canal, also the land is very fertile. Some people go to Faisalabad, Lahore and Karachi for earning wages.

== Professions ==
- Farming
- Government Employment
- Trading (milk, charra, animals)
- In service sector (bankers, electricians)
- Manufacturing sector (rice mill employees, textile mill employees)
- Artisans (wood carvers, tailors)
- others

== See also ==
- Chiniot
- Chiniot District
- Chiniotis
- Chiniot Tehsil
