= Sheykhan =

Sheykhan or Shaikhan (Persian: شيخان) may refer to various places in Iran:

- Sheykhan, Gilan
- Shaikhan, Dalahu, Kermanshah Province
- Sheykhan, Kurdistan, Iran
- Sheykhan, Razavi Khorasan
- Sheykhan Karag, Sistan and Baluchestan Province
- Sheykhan, South Khorasan
- Sheykhan, Mahabad, West Azerbaijan Province
- Sheykhan, Oshnavieh, West Azerbaijan Province
- Sheykhan-e Davud Khuni

== See also ==
- Deh-e Sheykhan (disambiguation)
- Sheikhan, Pakistan, in Pakistan
