= Barana =

Village in Chiniot District, Punjab, Pakistan

Coordinates: 31°46′N 72°36′E

- Union council
- Interactive map of Barana
- Country: Pakistan
- Region: Punjab
- District: Chiniot
- Tehsil: Lalian

Population (2017 Census of Pakistan)
  - Total: 4,674
- Time zone: UTC+5 (PST)

Barana is a union council of Lalian Tehsil in Chiniot District, Punjab province, Pakistan.

Until 2009, Barana was a union council of Chiniot Tehsil, Jhang District. In 2009, Chiniot Tehsil was upgraded to a district, Lalian became a tehsil of the newly formed district.

Barana lies on the district's boundary with Sargodha District and is situated in Bhatiore region. This town is also a part of Kirana Bar.

== See also ==
- Chenab River
- Bhawana
