= Kot Nijabat =

- Village
- Nickname: Nabu Kot
- Location within Pakistan
- Coordinates: 31.58°N 72.67°E
- Country: Pakistan
- Province: Punjab
- District: Chiniot
- City: Bhawana City
- Time zone: UTC+5 (PST)
- Postal code: 35350
- Dialling code: 047

Kot Nijabat (Urdu: كوٹ نجابت) is a village of Bhawana city of Chiniot District in Punjab, Pakistan. The village is located 4 km away from New Lari Adda (new bus stand) of Bhawana on the Jhang–Chiniot Road towards Chiniot.

== Location ==
It is located on the bank of Chenab River on the Jhang–Chiniot Road.
