= Adlana =

- Town
- Mouza Adlana
- Location within Pakistan
- Coordinates: 31.29°N 72.50°E
- Country: Pakistan
- Province: Punjab

Government
  - Chairman: Mahar Dilawar Khan Jappa

Population (2023)
  - Total: 10,000
  - Density: 45/km^{2} (120/sq mi)
- Time zone: UTC+5 (PST)
- Postal Code: 35360
- Calling code: 047
- Number of towns: Mahmand Abad, Malkoka, Haji Abad, Abbas Pur, Chakki Wala, Mahal Wasawa, Lund, Malkuka Khu, Vehra
- Number of Union Councils: 26

Mouza Adlana is a town in Bhawana Tehsil of Chiniot District, Punjab, Pakistan. It is situated approximately 29 km from Chiniot city and about 16 km from Bhawana.

Adlana's population consists substantially of the Jappa Rajput tribe; other groups include the Kumhar, Nai, Tarkhan, Muslim Shaikh, Lohar, Machi, and Miraci.

== Facilities ==
Adlana has one girls primary school, one boys high school and a basic health unit hospital. There are multiple shops related to domestic products buying. One cemetery near the Adlana village has graves approx 100 years old.
