= Mauza Sulemaan =

Mauza Sulemaan موضع سلیمان
- Village
- Location in the area of Bhawana
- Coordinates: 31°30′12″N 72°29′57″E
- Country: Pakistan
- Province: Punjab
- District: Chiniot
- Tehsil: Bhawana

Mauza Sulemaan (Urdu: موضع سلیمان) is a village in Chiniot District in Punjab province of Pakistan. The village is 18 km from Bhawana City, the headquarter of Bhawana Tehsil of Chiniot district.

A 200-year-old Hindu temple in the village has deteriorated amid lack of maintenance.
