= Nithar Ke =

- Village
- Location within Pakistan
- Coordinates: 31.29°N 72.50°E
- Country: Pakistan
- Province: Punjab
- District: Chiniot
- Tehsil: Bhawana
- Time zone: UTC+5 (PST)

Nithar Ke (Punjabi, Urdu: نٹھر کے) is a village of Bhawana tehsil in Chiniot district, Punjab, Pakistan. Its population is approximately 2,000. The nearest big city is Bhawana.
