= Salara, Punjab =

Village in Punjab, Pakistan

Salara
- Village
- Location within Pakistan
- Coordinates: 31.29°N 72.50°E
- Country: Pakistan
- Province: Punjab
- District: Chiniot

Population (2017 Census of Pakistan)
  - Total: 4,992
- Time zone: UTC+5 (PST)

Salara also known as Salaray is a village located near Aminpur, a small town in Chiniot District of Punjab, Pakistan.

Salaray village used to be part of Chiniot Tehsil of Jhang District; it was made part of Chiniot District when the tehsil was upgraded as a district in 2009.
