= Lali (tribe) =

Clan in Punjab, Pakistan

- Jāti: Jat
- Religions: Islam, Sikhism, Hinduism
- Languages: Punjabi
- Country: Pakistan
- Region: Punjab
- Ethnicity: Punjabi
- Family names: yes

The Lali, sometimes written as Lalee, are a Jat clan, found mainly in Chiniot District of Punjab, Pakistan. Wali Muhammad Lali from Lalian was the most powerful figure of history of Lali family.

== History ==
The Lali are one of a number of Jat clans that have lived in the Kirana Bar for centuries. The tribe has produced a famous Sufi saint, Mian Muhammad Siddique Lali, who has given them a status of sanctity among the other Bar tribes.

Their traditional seat of power was the village of Kawenwala, but this was reduced to a petty chieftainship with the arrival of the British. This village has many people from Lali tribe even today. The Lalis also founded the town of Lalian, literally the place of the Lali, where many Lalis still live. Members of the clan have won many elections from the constituency around Lalian Tehsil which has made them politically strong in the area.

The Lalis also have a few settlements outside Chiniot District, for example in Sargodha District.

== Notable people ==
- Ghulam Muhammad Lali, Member of National Assembly of Pakistan from Chiniot District, Punjab, Pakistan
- Imtiaz Ahmad Lali, Member, Provincial Assembly of the Punjab (2013–2018)
- Taimoor Ali Lali, Member, Provincial Assembly of the Punjab (2018 – present)
