= Hakmey Wala =

Village in Chiniot District, Punjab, Pakistan

- Village
- Location within Pakistan
- Coordinates: 31°36′13″N 72°43′35″E
- Country: Pakistan
- Province: Punjab
- District: Chiniot

Hakmey Wala (Punjabi: حاکمےوالا), also known as Chak No. 187/JB, is a village of Bhawana Tehsil, Chiniot District in the Punjab province of Pakistan. The village is located near Aminpur road. The population of Hakmey Wala is 3,488, per the 2017 Census of Pakistan.
