= NA-93 Chiniot-I =

Constituency of the National Assembly of Pakistan

- Constituency for the National Assembly of Pakistan
- Region: Lalian Tehsil and Bhawana Tehsil (partly) of Chiniot District
- Electorate: 437,041

Current constituency
- Party: Pakistan Tehreek-e-Insaf
- Member: Ghulam Muhammad Lali
- Created from: NA-88 Jhang-III

NA-93 Chiniot-I (این اے-93، چنیوٹ-1) is a constituency for the National Assembly of Pakistan. It comprises Lalian Tehsil, the city of Rabwah and a majority of Bhawana Tehsil. The constituency was formally known as NA-88 (Jhang-III) before the 2018 delimitations. The creation of Chiniot District in 2009 from areas previously included in Jhang District mandated this change in nomenclature.

== Members of Parliament ==
=== 2018–2023: NA-99 Chiniot-I ===
Election	Member	Party
2018	Ghulam Muhammad Lali	PTI

=== 2024–present: NA-93 Chiniot-I ===
Election	Member	Party
2024	Ghulam Muhammad Lali	PTI

== Election 2002 ==
General elections were held on 10 October 2002. Ghulam Bibi Bharwana of PML-Q won by 55,851 votes.

General election 2002: NA-88 Jhang-III
Party	Candidate	Votes	%	±%
PML(Q)	Ghulam Bibi Bharwana	55,851	44.26	
PPP	Syed Asad Hayat	38,983	30.89	
NA	Mehr Muhammad Nawaz Bharwana	17,866	14.16	
Independent	Mehr Muhammad Zafer Ullah Khan	12,223	9.69	
PML(N)	Ali Hamayun Sipra	1,267	1.00	
Turnout		130,048	49.76	
Total valid votes		126,190	97.03	
Rejected ballots		3,858	2.97	
Majority		16,868	13.37	
Registered electors		261,341		

== Election 2008 ==
General elections were held on 18 February 2008. Ghulam Bibi Bharwana of PML-Q won by 63,515 votes.

General election 2008: NA-88 Jhang-III
Party	Candidate	Votes	%	±%
PML(Q)	Ghulam Bibi Bharwana	63,515	44.72	
PPP	Syeda Sughra Imam	55,621	39.16	
Independent	Syed Asad Hayat	21,874	15.40	
Independent	Muhammad Javid Arif Gondal	1,012	0.72	
Turnout		148,479	48.29	
Total valid votes		142,022	96.65	
Rejected ballots		6,457	3.25	
Majority		7,894	5.56	
Registered electors		307,499		
PML(Q) hold				

== Election 2013 ==
General elections were held on 11 May 2013. Ghulam Bibi Bharwana of PML-N won by 87,002 votes and became the member of National Assembly.

General election 2013: NA-88 Jhang-III
Party	Candidate	Votes	%	±%
PML(N)	Ghulam Bibi Bharwana	87,466	50.79	
Independent	Syed Asad Hayat	68,886	40.00	
Others	Others (nine candidates)	15,849	9.21	
Turnout		179,510	64.58	
Total valid votes		172,201	95.93	
Rejected ballots		7,309	4.07	
Majority		18,580	10.79	
Registered electors		277,976		
PML(N) gain from PML(Q)				

== Election 2018 ==
General elections were held on 25 July 2018.

General election 2018: NA-99 Chiniot-I
Party	Candidate	Votes	%	±%
PTI	Ghulam Muhammad Lali	81,330	39.33	
Independent	Ghulam Abbas	64,307	31.10	
PPP	Makhdoomzada Syed Asad Hayat	22,324	10.80	
PML(N)	Rehan Qaiser	21,702	10.49	
Others	Others (six candidates)	17,129	8.28	
Turnout		214,119	55.56	
Total valid votes		206,792	96.58	
Rejected ballots		7,327	3.42	
Majority		17,023	8.23	
Registered electors		385,377		
PTI gain from PML(N)				

== Election 2024 ==
General elections were held on 8 February 2024. Ghulam Muhammad Lali won the election with 94,406 votes.

General election 2024: NA-93 Chiniot-I
Party	Candidate	Votes	%	±%
PTI	Ghulam Muhammad Lali (Note: Filed nomination papers as PTI candidate but ECP allowed him to run as an Independent)	94,406	41.26	▲1.93
Independent	Ghulam Abbas	59,909	26.18	▼4.92
Independent	Ghulam Bibi Bharwana	42,432	18.54	
PML(N)	Syed Muhammad Raza Bukhari	13,485	5.89	▼4.60
Others	Others (ten candidates)	18,576	8.12	
Turnout		238,030	54.46	▼1.10
Total valid votes		228,808	96.13	
Rejected ballots		9,222	3.87	
Majority		34,497	15.08	▲6.85
Registered electors		437,041		

== See also ==
- NA-92 Bhakkar-II
- NA-94 Chiniot-II
