= Langar Makhdoom =

Langar Makhdoom لنگر مخدوم
- Village
- Location in Pakistan
- Coordinates: 32°11′18″N 73°01′43″E
- Country: Pakistan
- Province: Punjab
- District: Chiniot

Langar Makhdoom is a village of Chiniot District in Punjab, Pakistan.

Langar Makhdoom is the first village of Lalian Tehsil, where the boundary of Chiniot District starts. Langar Makhdoom QH (Qanoongo Halqa) has a population of 52,578 with a literacy rate of 43.30%. The population is 99.85% Muslim. The area is 39696 Acres. 4,533 people are age 60 and above. Village has one government high school, one middle school for girls, and two primary schools, as well as a Basic Health Unit with maternity services and a veterinary hospital. The village has a Jama Masjid, named Masjid Burhan ud din, in the memory of Makhdoom Burhan Ud Din the saint (Sufi or Peer) of the area. Castes represented include Makhdoom, Gondal, Rehan, Khokhar, Qazi, Arain, Ranjha, Bhatti (Kumhaar, Lohaar, Tirkhan, Pawli, Mochi, Sonaar, Bar, Dhabbay), Muslim Shaikh, Shaikh, Gujjar, Awan, Muhajir, Lak, Taili, and Tonday.

The village is surrounded by agricultural areas, and the majority of the populace engages in farming. The village produces wheat, rice, sugarcane, citrus fruit, watermelons and vegetables. Other occupations include politics, military, and civil services, such as police, irrigation, Water & Power Development Authority, communication, healthcare, construction, business, education, and judiciary, as well as a few working abroad, mainly in the United States, Canada, Saudi Arabia, Netherlands, Italy, Spain and the United Kingdom. The village has a modern sewerage system, but the structure is old.
