= Pathan Kot =

Pathankot
- Town
- —Town of Bhawana—
- Location within Pakistan
- Coordinates: 31.34°N 72.39°E
- Country: Pakistan
- Province: Punjab
- District: Chiniot
- City: Bhawana City
- Time zone: UTC+5 (PST)
- Postal code: 35350
- Dialling code: 047

Pathan Kot is a town near Bhawana, in Chiniot tehsil of Punjab, Pakistan. It is located on the Jhang–Chiniot Road, 16 km from Bhawana city towards Chiniot.
