= Jamia Abad =

Jamia Abad جامع آباد
- Town
- Location on Jhang Chiniot road, Pakistan
- Coordinates: 31°36′13″N 72°43′35″E
- Country: Pakistan
- Province: Punjab
- District: Chiniot
- Tehsil: Bhawana
- Dialling code: 47

Jamia Abad (also Jamiabad) (Urdu: جامعﺁباد, Punjabi: جامیاباد) is a town of Bhawana, in Chiniot District of Punjab, Pakistan. It is located near Jhang-Chiniot Road 9 km away from Bhawana towards Chiniot and 56 km from Faisalabad.

== Location ==
The town is located on the Jhang-Chiniot Road approximately 13 km from Chenab River.
