= Hussainabad, Punjab =

Village in Bhawana, Chiniot District, Punjab, Pakistan

Hussainabd Bhawana
- Town
- Nickname: Nalka Adda
- Location within Pakistan
- Coordinates: 31.51°N 72.56°E
- Country: Pakistan
- Province: Punjab
- District: Chiniot District
- City: Bhawana City

Government Bhawana
  - Type: Town

Hussainabad (also called Nalka Adda) (Urdu: حسينﺁباد) is a town of Bhawana City, in Chiniot District, Punjab, Pakistan. Agriculture is the main vocation.

== Location ==
The town is located on Jhang–Chiniot Road, 10 km from Bhawana towards Jhang. It is located on the bank of Chenab River.
