= Mangoana =

- Village
- Location within Pakistan
- Coordinates: 31.29°N 72.50°E
- Country: Pakistan
- Province: Punjab
- District: Chiniot
- Time zone: UTC+5 (PST)

Mangoana is a locality close to the city of Bhawana in Chiniot District, Punjab, Pakistan. It is situated in the center of Bhawana and Painsra.

Among Mangoana's educational facilities is a Government girls' primary school, the Alfalah Public Model School, which is supervised by Muhammad Ashraf Haral. The late Hafiz Ghulam Hussain started "Madrasaa Al Ayesha Sadiqah" for girls. Ghulam Hussain and Javaid Iqbal Sialvi performed services in the education field for the whole village. Javaid Iqbal Sialvi constructed another Madrasaa Al-Fatima tu-Zahra (religious school) for girls in 2008. These two institutions are in progress and contribute to girls education. Al-Fatima English Grammar School is famous for primary education.Al- Fatime Girls High school affiliated with Faisalabad Board. A new college constructed in Mangoana village in 2021, the Bakhtawar Girls College, useful for girls unable to travel far from their homes to study. Muhammad Rafique has sole credit for establishing such a big educational complex in Mangoana. Mangoana produces many officers, IT specialist, judges and other well educated people.

The main castes of this village are Hanjra, Haral, Chadhar, Rajoka, Sahmal and Bar. The name of an administrative subdistrict (Note: Shown in 1998 Census report as "Mangoana QH". In Pakistan "QH" denotes Qanungo Halqa, an administrative subdistrict).) with a population in 1998 of 74,753.
