= Tahli Mangeni =

- Town
- Location within Pakistan
- Coordinates: 31°36′13″N 72°43′35″E
- Country: Pakistan
- Province: Punjab
- District: Chiniot

Talhi Mangini (Punjabi: ٹهلي منگيني) is a town of Bhawana tehsil of Chiniot District in Punjab, Pakistan. It is located on the left bank of Chenab River.

== Introduction ==
The residents of the town are Chadhar, Syed and Thabal tribes. This is a cultural area of Bhawana.

== See also ==
- Bhawana
- Bhawana Tehsil
- Chiniot
- Chiniot District
