= Taja Berwala =

- Village
- Location within Pakistan
- Coordinates: 31.29°N 72.50°E
- Country: Pakistan
- Province: Punjab
- District: Chiniot
- Tehsil: Bhawana
- Time zone: UTC+5 (PST)

Taja Berwala, also spelled as Taja Barwala, is a town of Bhawana Tehsil in the Chiniot District of Punjab province, Pakistan. It is located on the left bank of the river Chenab.

== Demographics ==
The population of the village, according to 2017 census, was 4,256.
