= Lalian =

Town in Punjab, Pakistan

Lalian لالیاں
- Town
- Location in the Pakistan
- Coordinates: 31°49′31″N 72°48′10″E
- Country: Pakistan
- Province: Punjab
- District: Chiniot
- Established: 2 February 2009

Government
  - Type: Municipal council
- Elevation: 171 m (561 ft)

Population (2023 Census of Pakistan)
  - Total: 52,542
- Time zone: UTC+5 (PST)
  - Summer (DST): UTC+6 (PDT)
- Dialling code: 047

Lalian (Punjabi: لالیاں) is a town in Lalian Tehsil of the Chiniot District in Punjab, Pakistan. It is located at 31°49'21N 72°47'50E at an altitude of 171 metres (564 feet) on the Faisalabad-Sargodha road.

Until 2009, Lalian was a town of Chiniot Tehsil which was part of Jhang District pre-2009. When Chiniot District was formed in 2009, Lalian became its tehsil.

== Demographics ==
Population

Historical population
Year	Pop.	±%
1972	10,578	—
1981	16,977	+60.5%
1998	28,794	+69.6%
2017	45,411	+57.7%
2023	52,542	+15.7%

According to official 2023 census results, the population of Lalian city is 52,542.

== History ==
Initially, this place was a village with land mainly owned by Lali clan, and a place where different sub-tribes of the Lali clan used to reside. Lalis remain a politically influential clan of the area. Details about the clan are to be found in books named Kulyat-e-Sadiqqui, and Kulyat-e-Lali, by Professor Riaz Ahmed Shad. The author has traced the history of Lali clan and linked them with the great Muslim hero, Tipu Sultan.

The police station of Lalian was established in 1867 during the British rule, the high school was also established during the British rule in 1918 as was the Rural Health Center. It has a technical training center managed under TEVTA and also has a veterinary hospital. NADRA office is shifted to Lalian on 11 July 2011 which is operating near the grain market.

== Government ==
Lalian was formed via town committee along with Garh Maharaja in 1928, and with the establishment of Chiniot District, it became tehsil in 2009.

The overall incharge of the Tehsil is Assistant Commissioner by his designation. The following Assistant Commissioners have served in Sub Division Lalian since its creation.

Assistant Commissioner	From	To
Tariq Khan Niazi	10.10.2009	15.08.2011
Sheikh Muhammad Tahir	18.08.2011	26.08.2011
Javed Ahmad Tatla	26.08.2011	11.04.2013
Saif Ullah Gill	12.04.2013	28.08.2013
Azam Kamal	28.08.2013	02.12.2013
Mian Usman Ali	02.12.2013	31.07.2015
Khawaja Muhammad Waqar	02.02.2013	31.08.2015
Kashif Raza Awan	25.08.2016	26.10.2018
Liaqat Ali Kalhoro	27.10.2018	to date

== See also ==
- Lalian Tehsil
- Chiniot
- Chiniot Tehsil
- Bhawana
- Bhawana Tehsil
- Sheikhan
