= Arbianwala =

- Town
- Location in Pakistan
- Coordinates: 29.39°N 71.31°E
- Country: Pakistan
- Province: Punjab
- District: Chiniot
- City: Bhawana
- Elevation: 107 m (351 ft)
- Time zone: UTC+5 (GMT)

Arbianwala is a small village in the vicinity of Bhawana in Chiniot District, Punjab, Pakistan.

It is located at 29°39'15N 71°31'40E with an altitude of 107 meters (354 feet).

The village is so named because much of its population is from Arbi, a tribe of the southern Punjab. Other inhabitants of the village belong to the Syed, Chuchkana, Naul, Chadhar, and Jappa tribes/ clans.
