= Thatta Jhamb =

- Village
- Location within Pakistan
- Coordinates: 31.29°N 72.50°E
- Country: Pakistan
- Province: Punjab
- District: Chiniot
- Time zone: UTC+5 (PST)

Thatta Jhamb (Punjabi: ٹھٹہ جھانب) is a small village in Bhawana Tehsil in Chiniot District of Punjab, Pakistan. The village is located near Jhang-Chiniot Road. The villagers are mostly from the Klasan, Jappa and Chadhar castes.
