= PP-96 Chiniot-III =

Constituency of the Punjabi Provincial Legislature, Pakistan

- Constituency for the Provincial Assembly of Punjab
- Region: Chiniot Tehsil (partly) and Bhawana Tehsil (partly) of Chiniot District

Current constituency
- Created from: PP-74 Jhang-II (2002-2018); PP-95 Chiniot-III (2018-2023)

PP-96 Chiniot-III (پی پی-96، چنيوٹ-3) is a Constituency of Provincial Assembly of Punjab.

== General elections 2024 ==
Provincial election 2024: PP-96 Chiniot-III
Party	Candidate	Votes	%	±%
Independent	Zulfiqar Ali Shah	52,802	42.05	
PPP	Syed Hassan Murtaza	43,255	34.45	
Independent	Muhammad Hussain (Note: Filed nomination papers as PTI candidate but ECP allowed him to run as an Independent)	18,771	14.95	
Independent	Tahir Nawaz	5,179	4.13	
TLP	Syed Nadeem Ali Shah	3,119	2.48	
Others	Others (seven candidates)	2,433	1.94	
Turnout		130,386	61.38	
Total valid votes		125,559	96.30	
Rejected ballots		4,827	3.70	
Majority		9,547	7.60	
Registered electors		212,438		
hold				

== General elections 2018 ==
Provincial election 2018: PP-95 Chiniot-III
Party	Candidate	Votes	%	±%
PPP	Syed Hassan Murtaza	38,115	34.77	
Independent	Muhammad Rehmat Ullah	34,144	31.15	
PTI	Syed Muhammad Qaim Raza	22,451	20.48	
Independent	Muhammad Haroon	11,427	10.42	
Others	Others (five candidates)	3,485	3.18	
Turnout		114,526	63.47	
Total valid votes		109,622	95.72	
Rejected ballots		4,904	4.28	
Majority		3,971	3.62	
Registered electors		180,434		

== General elections 2013 ==
Provincial election 2013: PP-74 Jhang-II
Party	Candidate	Votes	%	±%
PML(N)	Muhammad Rehmat Ullah	38,230	43.81	
PPP	Syed Hassan Murtaza	32,659	37.43	
PTI	Muhammad Afzal Shah	6,742	7.73	
Independent	Sardar Sayad Fazal Abbas	6,606	7.57	
JI	Syed Noor Ul Hassan Shah	1,147	1.31	
Others	Others (eleven candidates)	1,880	2.15	
Turnout		90,798	64.68	
Total valid votes		87,264	96.11	
Rejected ballots		3,534	3.89	
Majority		5,571	6.38	
Registered electors		140,379		

== General elections 2008 ==
Contesting candidates	Party affiliation	Votes polled

== See also ==
- PP-95 Chiniot-II
- PP-97 Chiniot-IV
