= Muhammad Nafi' =

Pakistani Islamic scholar (1915–2014)

Maulana Muhammad Nāfiʿ
- Born: 1915; Muhammadi Sharif, Jhang district, British India (now Chiniot district, Pakistan)
- Died: 30 December 2014 (aged 98–99); Faisalabad, Pakistan
- Occupations: Islamic scholar, researcher, author
- Movement: Deobandi, Khatme Nubuwwat

Academic background
- Education: Darul Uloom Deoband
- Influences: Izaz Ali Amrohi, Ibrahim Balyawi, Muhammad Shafi

Academic work
- Discipline: Islamic jurisprudence,
- Sub-discipline: Hadith, Seerah, Aqeedah
- School or tradition: Hanafi
- Notable works: Ruhamāʾ-u-Baynahum, Sīrat-e-ʿAlī al-Murtaḍā, Banāt-e-Arbaʿah, Sīrat-e-Amīr Muʿāwiyah

Muhammad Nāfiʿ (1915 – 30 December 2014), known as Maulana Muhammad Nāfiʿ, was a Pakistani Islamic scholar, researcher, and author. He was an alumnus of Darul Uloom Deoband and contributed to Islamic scholarship through his writings on various religious topics. His notable works include Ruhamāʾ-u-Baynahum, Sīrat-e-ʿAlī al-Murtaḍā, Banāt-e-Arbaʿah, Sīrat-e-Ḥasanayn Sharīfayn, and Sīrat-e-Amīr Muʿāwiyah.

== Early life and education ==
Muhammad Nāfiʿ was born in 1915 in Muhammadi Sharif, Jhang District, British India (present-day Chiniot District, Punjab, Pakistan).

He memorized the Quran in 1933 (1352 AH) under the guidance of his father. He then studied elementary Islamic texts under Allah Jawaya Shah (d. 1362 AH) and his elder brother Muhammad Zakir.

He later enrolled at Madrasah Ishāʿat al-ʿUlūm in Lyallpur (now Faisalabad), where he studied subjects such as Arabic grammar and Islamic jurisprudence. Afterward, he continued his education at Darul Uloom Jamia Muhammadi Sharif in Mohammadi Sharif, Jhang District, where he studied under scholars including Qutbuddin Achhalvi and Sher Muhammad.

Seeking further education, he studied in Wan Bhachran (Mianwali District) and Ani (Gujrat District) under scholars such as Ghulam Yasin and Waliullah Gujrati, covering subjects including Hadith and Islamic law.

In 1941 (1362 AH), he enrolled at Darul Uloom Deoband, where he studied Hadith, Fiqh, and Tafsir under scholars such as Izaz Ali Amrohi, Ibrahim Balyawi, Mufti Riazuddin Bijnori, and Muhammad Shafi. He completed his studies in 1943 (1363 AH) and received his graduation certificate (Sanad No. 13054).

At the Deoband seminary, he had the contemporaneity of Khawaja Khan Muhammad and Muhammad Sarfaraz Khan Safdar.

== Career ==
After completing his education, Nāfiʿ joined Darul Uloom Jamia Muhammadi in Muhammadi Sharif as a teacher and later became its administrator. He was also associated with Tanzeem Ahl-e-Sunnat Pakistan and contributed to various religious publications, including Al-Faruq and Al-Dawah.

In 1953, he participated in the Khatm-e-Nubuwwat Movement against the Ahmadiyya community, leading to his imprisonment for three months in Jhang and Lahore's Borstal Jail.

== Works ==
Nāfiʿ authored several books on Islamic history, Hadith, and theology. Some of his notable works include:

- Ruhamāʾ-u-Baynahum (3 volumes)
- Sīrat ʿAlī al-Murtaḍā
- Sīrat Amīr Muʿāwiyah
- Sīrat Ḥasanayn Sharīfayn
- Hazrat Abu Sufyan aur Unki Ahliya
- Banāt-e-Arbaʿah
- Aẓmat-e-Ṣaḥāba
- Masʾala-e-Aqribāʾ Parwari
- Masʾala-e-Khatm-e-Nabuwwat aur Salaf-e-Ṣāliḥīn
- Makātīb-e-Nafiʿ (compiled by Muhammad Usman)
- Ḥadīth-e-Thaqalayn

== Death ==
Nāfiʿ died on 30 December 2014 in Faisalabad, Pakistan, at the age of 99.
