= Samunder =

Pakistani village

- Village
- Location within Pakistan
- Coordinates: 31.598°N 72.681°E
- Country: Pakistan
- Province: Punjab
- District: Chiniot
- Time zone: UTC+5 (PST)

Moza Samunder is a village located approximately 6.5 km from Lari Adda Bhowana, in Chiniot District of Punjab, Pakistan.

The Hanjra family, the village’s sole landholders, owns vast areas of land. The family descends from Sufi Islamic scholar Hafiz Mian Barkhurdar and is well known for their intellect and educational contributions, which are said to have inspired the village's name, "Samunder," symbolizing depth of knowledge and wisdom.

While agriculture has traditionally been the main occupation, the newer generation, despite its strong educational background, is increasingly working in government and private sectors, as well as running their own businesses. Hanjra family is also known as jutt the most cheerful
