= Rashida, Punjab =

Rashida رشیدہ
- Village

Rashida (Urdu: رشیدہ) is a village in the tehsil and district of Chiniot in Punjab, Pakistan. Located on the Jhang–Chiniot Road, the village has an approximate population of 2,000.
