= PP-95 Chiniot-II =

Constituency of the Punjabi Provincial Legislature, Pakistan

- Constituency for the Provincial Assembly of Punjab
- Region: Chiniot Tehsil (partly) including Chiniot city of Chiniot District

Current constituency
- Created from: PP-73 Jhang-I (2002-2018); PP-94 Chiniot-II (2018-2023)

PP-95 Chiniot-II (پی پی-95، چنيوٹ-2) is a Constituency of Provincial Assembly of Punjab.

== General elections 2024 ==
Provincial election 2024: PP-95 Chiniot-II
Party	Candidate	Votes	%	±%
PML(N)	Muhammad Ilyas	36,794	30.10	
Independent	Shoukat Ali (Note: Filed nomination papers as PTI candidate but ECP allowed him to run as an Independent)	29,715	24.31	
Independent	Muhammad Imran Ali	28,043	22.94	
PPP	Syed Kaleem Ali Ameer	21,256	17.39	
TLP	Sher Gul Khan	3,217	2.63	
Others	Others (twelve candidates)	3,221	2.63	
Turnout		126,331	53.74	
Total valid votes		122,246	96.77	
Rejected ballots		4,085	3.23	
Majority		7,079	5.79	
Registered electors		235,100		
hold				

== General elections 2018 ==
Provincial election 2018: PP-94 Chiniot-II
Party	Candidate	Votes	%	±%
PML(N)	Muhammad Ilyas	52,745	49.25	
PTI	Ali Hassan Raza Qazi	22,366	20.89	
PPP	Syed Kaleem Ali Ameer	20,169	18.83	
AAT	Intazar Hussain	3,509	3.28	
TLP	Ghulam Mustafa	3,294	3.08	
Independent	Syed Anjum Ali Ameer	2,133	1.99	
Others	Others (ten candidates)	2,873	2.68	
Turnout		109,661	60.17	
Total valid votes		107,089	97.66	
Rejected ballots		2,572	2.34	
Majority		30,379	28.36	
Registered electors		182,239		

== General elections 2013 ==
Provincial election 2013: PP-73 Jhang-I
Party	Candidate	Votes	%	±%
PML(N)	Muhammad Ilyas	47,300	46.02	
PTI	Hassan Ali Qazi	18,746	18.24	
PPP	Syed Kaleem Ali Ameer	18,451	17.95	
Independent	Intazar Hussain	8,473	8.24	
Independent	Javed Iqbal Qamar	2,799	2.72	
Independent	Shahana Hameed	1,799	1.75	
Independent	Ali Ameen	1,164	1.13	
Independent	Mubashar Ahmad	1,061	1.03	
Others	Others (seventeen candidates)	2,992	2.91	
Turnout		106,410	63.79	
Total valid votes		102,785	96.59	
Rejected ballots		3,625	3.41	
Majority		28,554	27.78	
Registered electors		166,805		

== General elections 2008 ==
Contesting candidates	Party affiliation	Votes polled

== See also ==
- PP-94 Chiniot-I
- PP-96 Chiniot-III
