= Darutta =

Pakistani village

Darutta داروٹہ
- Village
- Location on Jhang Chiniot road, Pakistan
- Coordinates: 31°37′12″N 72°45′53″E
- Country: Pakistan
- Province: Punjab
- District: Chiniot District
- Tehsil: Bhawana

Darutta (Urdu: داروٹہ, Punjabi: دروٹا) is a village in Bhawana city of Chiniot District in Punjab, Pakistan. The 1,000 households in the village have 8 members per household on average.

Due to wastewater from the nearby Ramzan Mills, the groundwater quality in the village is severely affected. As a result, one in five people in Darutta suffers from hepatitis.

== Main tribes ==
- Kharal
- Mumbarr (Rind)

== Main personalities ==
- Noor Ahamd Khan Mumbarr (Late.dep.sectry finance Pakistan)
- Rai Fazal Abbas Kharal
- Khan Yousaf Khan Mumbarr
- Rai Iqbal Khan Kharal
- Rai Shahid Kharal (ex.gen. councilor)
- Khan Yaqoob Khan Mumbarr
- Manak Khan Mumbarr (ex. councilor)
