= Thatta (disambiguation) =

Thatta is a city in Sindh, Pakistan.

Thatta may also refer to:

- Thatta District, an administrative unit of Sindh, Pakistan
- Thatta, Attock, a town in Punjab, Pakistan
- Thatta Jhamb, a village in Punjab, Pakistan
- Thatta, Sultanpur Lodhi, a village in Punjab, India

== See also ==
- Thattamala, a neighbourhood in Kollam, India
