= Rajoka =

Village in Pakistan

Coordinates: 31°35′41.36″N 72°55′26.07″E

Rajoka is a village of Bhawana Tehsil in Chiniot District, of Punjab, Pakistan.
