= PP-94 Chiniot-I =

Constituency of the Provincial Assembly of Punjab

- Constituency for the Provincial Assembly of Punjab
- Region: Lalian Tehsil (partly) of Chiniot District

Current constituency
- Created from: PP-80 Jhang-VIII (2002-2018); PP-93 Chiniot-I (2018-2023)

PP-94 Chiniot-I (پی پی-94، چنيوٹ-1) is a Constituency of Provincial Assembly of Punjab.

== General elections 2024 ==
Provincial election 2024: PP-94 Chiniot-I
Party	Candidate	Votes	%	±%
Independent	Taimoor Ali Lali	47,935	44.30	
Independent	Imtiaz Ahmad Lali	47,153	43.58	
PML(N)	Shah Behram Bral	4,129	3.82	
Independent	Syed Muhammad Hassan Nawaz (Note: Filed nomination papers as PTI candidate but ECP allowed him to run as an Independent)	3,250	3.00	
Others	Others (ten candidates)	5,731	5.30	
Turnout		112,798	48.88	
Total valid votes		108,198	95.92	
Rejected ballots		4,600	4.08	
Majority		782	0.72	
Registered electors		230,755		
hold				

== General elections 2018 ==
Provincial election 2018: PP-93 Chiniot-I
Party	Candidate	Votes	%	±%
Independent	Taimoor Ali Lali	46,773	48.59	
PTI	Muhammad Haider Lali	40,819	42.41	
PPP	Aamir Nawaz	2,236	2.32	
Independent	Ghulam Muhammad	2,173	2.26	
Others	Others (eleven candidates)	4,255	4.42	
Turnout		98,897	49.74	
Total valid votes		96,256	97.33	
Rejected ballots		2,641	2.67	
Majority		5,954	6.18	
Registered electors		198,820		

== General elections 2013 ==
Provincial election 2013: PP-80 Jhang-VIII
Party	Candidate	Votes	%	±%
PML(N)	Khalid Ghani Chaudhry	27,639	32.62	
PML(Q)	Hafiz Muhammad Qamar Hayat Kathia	22,724	26.82	
Independent	Mian Muhammad Asif Kathia	21,007	24.80	
Independent	Ali Abbas Khan Kamlana Sial	7,339	8.66	
Independent	Muhammad Saeed Akhtar	2,054	2.42	
PTI	Muhammad Safder Riaz Cheema	1,963	2.32	
Others	Others (five candidates)	1,993	2.35	
Turnout		88,483	64.67	
Total valid votes		84,719	95.75	
Rejected ballots		3,764	4.25	
Majority		4,915	5.80	
Registered electors		136,830		

== General elections 2008 ==
Contesting candidates	Party affiliation	Votes polled

== See also ==
- PP-93 Bhakkar-V
- PP-95 Chiniot-II
