= Shekhan =

Shekhan may refer to:

- Al-Shikhan, a district and city in the Ninewa Governorate of Iraq
- Shekhan District, a district in the Ninewa Governorate of Iraq

== See also ==
- Sheykhan (disambiguation)
