= Taimoor Ali Lali =

Pakistani politician

Member of the Provincial Assembly of the Punjab
- Incumbent
- Assumed office 24 February 2024
- Constituency: PP-94 Chiniot-I
- In office 15 August 2018 – 14 January 2023
- Constituency: PP-93 Chiniot-I

Personal details
- Party: IPP (2025-present)
- Other political affiliations: PMLN (2024-2025); IPP (2023-2024); PMLN (2022-2023); PTI (2018-2022); IND (2018)

Taimoor Ali Lali is a Pakistani politician of Lali clan in Chiniot District. He is an incumbent member of the Provincial Assembly of the Punjab since 8 February 2024. He also had been a member of the Provincial Assembly of the Punjab from August 2018 till January 2023.

== Political career ==
He was elected to the Provincial Assembly of the Punjab as an independent candidate from PP-93 (Chiniot-I) in the 2018 Punjab provincial election.

He joined Pakistan Tehreek-e-Insaf (PTI) following his election. in Pervaiz Elahi ministry, he was made the special assistant to the Chief Minister of Punjab.

He was re-elected to the Provincial Assembly of the Punjab as an independent candidate from PP-94 (Chiniot-I) in the 2024 Punjab provincial election.

He joined Pakistan Muslim League-Nawaz (PML-N) following his election.
