= School Khanoana =

School Khanoana سکول کھانوآنہ
- Village
- Location on Jhang Chiniot road, Pakistan
- Coordinates: 31°47′15.53″N 72°49′44.58″E
- Country: Pakistan
- Province: Punjab
- Tehsil: Bhawana

School Khanoana (Punjabi: سکول کھانوآنا, Urdu: سکول کھانوآنہ) is a village of Bhawana located on the Jhang-Chiniot road, in Punjab, Pakistan. It is named after the Sial (tribe) "Khanoana" residents of the area of Jhang, Chiniot and Bhawana. Talib Hussain Dard, a Punjabi folk singer, was born in this village.
