= Muhammadi Sharif =

- Town
- Location within Pakistan
- Coordinates: 31°36′13″N 72°43′35″E
- Country: Pakistan
- Province: Punjab
- District: Chiniot

Muhammadi, also known as Jamia Muhammadi Sharif, is a village of Bhawana Tehsil in Chiniot District of Punjab province, Pakistan. It is named after Mian Muhammadi Juwan (a Sufi and disciple of the saints of Multan and originally named Mian Imam Deen). The village is located 2 km from the left bank of the Chenab River. The village is the home of Mualana Muhammad Zakir, a religious leader and politician. His son, Muhammad Rahmat-ul-Allah Khokhar (remained MNA), is also a politician. This village has a famous Dar-ul-uloom which has produced many religious scholars.
