= Chak 226 JB =

Village in Punjab, Pakistan

Chak No 226 Jb Bharwana (بھروآنہ) is a village in Bhawana Tehsil, district Chiniot, Punjab, Pakistan. It is located on Mangoana-Jhang Link Road.

There are two mosques in this village, one located in the older part of the village, known as Purani Abadi, and the other is the new adjacent settlement, known as Nayi Abadi.

== Education ==
Two Govt Primary schools for boys and girls are located in Village. And one Private school Al Ameeq Memorial Public School is also built for proper education as well as Islamic education for children of the village.

== Constituency ==
Mr. Javaid Iqbal Bharwana (Assistant Director) Price Control & Commodity Management Department, Govt. of Punjab is a notable person in this village.
