= Deh-e Sheykhan =

Deh-e Sheykhan (Persian: ده شيخان) may refer to:

- Deh-e Sheykhan, Kohgiluyeh and Boyer-Ahmad
- Deh-e Sheykhan, Lorestan
