= Wara Thatta Muhammad Shah =

Village in Chiniot District, Punjab Province, Pakistan

Coordinates: 31.5492°N 72.5350°E

Wara Thatta Muhammad Shah is a village in Chiniot District, Punjab Province, Pakistan.

== Demographics ==
According to the 2017 census, the village population was 15,218.
