= Rao Bagh =

- Town
- Location within Pakistan
- Coordinates: 31°36′13″N 72°43′35″E
- Country: Pakistan
- Province: Punjab
- District: Chiniot

Rao Bagh (Urdu: راؤ باغ) is a town in Chiniot District, of Punjab, Pakistan. It is located 4 km (2.5 mi) from the city of Chiniot towards Lahore.
