= Ratta Matta =

- Union council and town
- Location within Pakistan
- Coordinates: 31°34′N 72°25′E
- Country: Pakistan
- Province: Punjab
- District: Jhang

Ratta Matta is a town and Union council of Jhang District in the Punjab province of Pakistan located on the Jhang-Lalian road. Ratta and Matta are separate towns. Before the land reforms of Ayub Khan, Syed Waris Shah of the town held proprietorship of 12 villages, including Ratta, Matta, Hashim Wala, Rajay Wala, Khalar Awan, Panjgirain, Shergarh, Langar Awan Kay Jhugay and Pippal Bhutta. The union council contains mustard fields. There are two connected towns named Ratta, Ratta Syedan and Ratta Khokharan.
