= Shabbir Abad =

- Town
- Location within Pakistan
- Coordinates: 31°25′01″N 72°15′45″E
- Country: Pakistan
- Province: Punjab
- District: Jhang
- Time zone: UTC+5 (PST)

Shabbir Abad is a town of Jhang District, in Punjab, Pakistan, located on the Jhang–Chiniot Road.
