= Ballowana =

- Village
- Location within Pakistan
- Coordinates: 30°53′05″N 72°26′25″E
- Country: Pakistan
- Province: Punjab
- District: Faisalabad
- Time zone: UTC+5 (PST)

Ballowana is a village of Faisalabad District near the town of Painsra in central Punjab, Pakistan.
