= Maulana Muhammad Rehmat Ullah =

Pakistani politician

Member of the Provincial Assembly of the Punjab
- In office 29 May 2013 – 31 May 2018

Personal details
- Born: 27 January 1935 (age 91)
- Party: Pakistan Muslim League (Nawaz)

Punjab Assembly Lahore

Maulana Muhammad Rehmat Ullah is a Pakistani politician who was a Member of the Provincial Assembly of the Punjab, between 1985 and May 2018.

== Early life and education ==
He was born on 27 January 1935.

He has received Islamic education.

== Political career ==
He was elected to the National Assembly of Pakistan from Constituency NA-64 (Jhang-II) in 1985 Pakistani general election.

He ran for the seat of the National Assembly from Constituency NA-67 (Jhang-II) as a candidate of Islami Jamhoori Ittehad (IJI) in the 1988 Pakistani general election but was unsuccessful. He received 42,107 votes and lost the seat to Abida Hussain. After the 1988 Pakistani general election he was elected in by election as MNA candidate of PPP Muhammad Ali shah was defeated by him.

He was re-elected to the National Assembly from Constituency NA-67 (Jhang-II) as a candidate of IJI in the 1990 Pakistani general election. He secured 57,263 votes and defeated his closest contender Syed Asad Hayat, a candidate of the Pakistan Democratic Alliance (PDA).

He ran for the seat of the National Assembly from Constituency NA-67 (Jhang-II) as a candidate of Pakistan Muslim League (N) (PML-N) in the 1993 Pakistani general election but was unsuccessful. He received 49,152 votes and lost the seat to candidate, of the PDA, Syed Asad Hayat.

He was re-elected to the National Assembly from Constituency NA-67 (Jhang-II) as a candidate of PML-N in the 1997 Pakistani general election. He secured 52,911 votes and defeated Syed Asad Hayat, a candidate of the Pakistan Peoples Party (PPP).

He ran for the seat of the National Assembly from Constituency NA-86 (Jhang-I) as a candidate of Muttahida Majlis-e-Amal (MMA) in the 2002 Pakistani general election but was unsuccessful. He received 29,336 votes and lost the seat to Mohammad Tahir Shah, a candidate of the Pakistan Muslim League (Q) (PML-Q). In the same election, he ran for the seat of the Provincial Assembly of the Punjab as an independent candidate from Constituency PP-74 (Jhang—II) but was unsuccessful. He received 111 votes and lost the seat to Syed Hassan Murtaza, a candidate of the PPP.

He ran for the seat of the Provincial Assembly of the Punjab as an independent candidate from Constituency PP-74 (Jhang-II) in the 2008 Punjab provincial election but was unsuccessful. He received 31,722 votes and lost the seat to Syed Hassan Murtaza, a candidate of PPP.

He was elected to the Provincial Assembly of the Punjab as a candidate of PML-N from Constituency PP-74 (Chiniot-II) in the 2013 Punjab provincial election. He received 38,230 votes and defeated Syed Hassan Murtaza, a candidate of PPP.
