= Board of Investment (Pakistan) =

Pakistani investment promotion agency

Prime Minister's Office - Board of Investment (BOI)
- Type: Pakistan Government
- Founded: October 1992 (as Pakistan Investment Board)
- Headquarters: Islamabad
- Key people: Qaiser Ahmed Sheikh
- Products: Inward Investment support
- Website: www.invest.gov.pk

The Board of Investment (BOI; Urdu: ہیئتِ پاکستان برائے سرمایہ کاری) is the premier investment promotion agency of Pakistan working under the administrative control of the Prime Minister’s Office and is mandated to promote and facilitate both local & foreign investment. The Board of Investment is a member of the World Association of Investment Promotion Agencies (WAIPA).

== Ease of doing business ==
According to the World Bank’s Doing Business Report, 2020, Pakistan is No. 1 in terms of big jump in ranking of ease of doing business index (EoDB) among 11 biggest economies. Pakistan is the top reformer in South Asia and among the top 20 EoDB reformers. The reforms were recognized in the fields of starting a business, trade across borders, getting electricity, dealing with construction permits, registering properties and paying taxes.

The next step is to cut out redundant regulations and remove unnecessary permissions/ NOCs and inspections under the BOI's new "Better Business Regulatory Initiative".

== Structure ==
Board members
Sr. No.	Name and Designation	Composition of the Board
Public Sector
01.	Shehbaz Sharif, Prime Minister	President of the Board
02.	Muhammad Aurangzeb, Minister of Finance	Member
03.	Aleem Khan, Minister of the Board of Investment	Member
04.	Jam Kamal Khan, Minister of Commerce	Member
05.	Ishaq Dar, Minister of Foreign Affairs	Member
06.	Rana Tanveer Hussain, Minister of Industries and Production	Member
07.	Awais Leghari, Minister of Energy	Member
08.	Shaza Fatima Khawaja, Minister for Information Technology & Telecommunication	Member
09.	Jameel Ahmed, Governor of the State Bank of Pakistan	Member
10.	Rashid Langrial, Chairman of the Federal Board of Revenue	Member
11.	Qaiser Ahmed Sheikh, Chairman of the Board of Investment	Member
12.	Captain (r) Muhammad Mehmood, Secretary BOI	Secretary of the Board
Private Sector
13.	Faisal Jawed, Director of the Din Group of Companies	Member
14.	Muhammad Imran Masood, Executive Director, Integrators (Pvt) Ltd	Member
15.	Asad Saleem Rehman, Director, Saleem Group of Industries	Member
16.	Khalid Mahmood, CEO, Getz Pharma Pvt Ltd	Member
17.	Syed Muhammad Talib Rizvi, Executive Director/COO, Banking & Fintech	Member
18.	Muhammad Yawar Irfan Khan, Chairman, Irfan Group of Companies	Member
19.	Asif Peer, CEO/Managing Director at Systems Limited Pakistan	Member
20.	Chaudhry Zulfiqar Ali Anjum, Chairman, S.M Group of Industries	Member
21.	Engr. Harris Naeem, CEO, HTMA (Pvt.) Ltd. Pakistan	Member
22.	Syed Hasnain Ibrahim Kazmi, Advocate, Supreme Court of Pakistan	Member
23.	Malik Muhammad Awais Khalid, Awais Khalid & Associates	Member
24.	Ayla Majid, Founder & CEO, Planetive Pakistan	Member
25.	Eyab Ahmed, Group PR Manager, Agency 21 International and Garana.com	Member
26.	Naveed Qamar, Special Assistant to CM Sindh on Investment and PPP Projects	Member

=== Departments and wings ===
- Investment Promotion Wing (IP)
- Ease of Doing Business and Better Business Regulatory Initiative Wing (EoDB / BBRI)
- Project Management Unit (PMU), China Pakistan Economic Corridor (CPEC) Industrial Cooperation
- Special Economic Zones Wing (SEZs)
- Administration & Management Information System Wing (Admin/MIS)
- Investment Policy, Legal & Research (PLR)
- Facilitation Wing
- Regional Offices

== Services ==
The wide range of professional services provided by Board of Investment includes disseminating information on the opportunities for investment and facilitating companies that are looking for project sites, joint venture partners and other resources. It promotes Pakistan as an investment destination through networking, conferences and events, media relations, Pakistan’s diplomatic missions abroad, and thought leadership.

The Board of Investment acts as a focal point of contact for prospective investors, both domestic and foreign to provide them with all necessary information and assistance in coordinating with other Government Departments/Agencies.

The Board of Investment also evaluates applications of investors for the Work / Business Visa, Branch / Liaison Office and Airport Entry Passes.

== Contacting Board of Investment ==
Board of Investment's global network will show companies why Pakistan is an ideal strategic choice for growth. By contacting the nearest Pakistani Embassy, High Commission, or Consulate, a company can get the information and assistance they need to make the right decisions.

Business leaders from across the globe work with the Board of Investment as "Honorary Investment Counsellors". They promote Pakistan internationally and highlight investment opportunities but also offer business experience and knowledge gained across a range of sectors and geographical markets.

The Board of Investment has specialist staff located at the head office in Islamabad along with offices in each of Pakistan’s four provinces.

== See also ==
- Investment promotion agency
