= Kheiwa =

Kheiwa کھیوہ
- Town
- Location on Jhang Chiniot road, Pakistan
- Coordinates: 31°45′22.89″N 72°46′28.99″E
- Country: Pakistan
- Province: Punjab
- District: Jhang

Khewa (Urdu, Punjabi: کھیوہ) is a town of Jhang District located on Jhang-Chiniot Road, in Punjab, Pakistan. It is part of Jhang Tehsil.
