= Syed Anayat Ali Shah =

Pakistani politician

Syed Inayat Ali Shah

Member of the National Assembly of Pakistan
- In office 2008–2013

Personal details
- Born: 30 October 1955 (age 70) Chiniot, Punjab, Pakistan
- Party: TLP (2025-present)
- Other political affiliations: PPP (2018-2025); PTI (2013-2018); PPP (2002-2013)

Syed Inayat Ali Shah (Punjabi, Urdu: سید عنایت علی شاہ) is a politician from Chiniot. He remained a Member of the National Assembly of Pakistan from 2008 till 2013, elected in the 2008 Pakistani general election from NA-86 (Chiniot-I). He belongs to Pakistan Peoples Party.

== Political career ==
Shah was elected to the National Assembly of Pakistan from Constituency NA-86 Chiniot-I as a candidate of Pakistan People's Party (PPP) in the 2008 Pakistani general election. He received 65,322 votes and defeated Qaiser Ahmed Sheikh.

Shah ran for the seat of the National Assembly from Constituency NA-86 (Chiniot-I) as a candidate of PPP in the 2013 Pakistani general election, but was unsuccessful. He received 40,199 votes and lost the seat to Qaiser Ahmed Sheikh.

== See also ==
- Chiniot
- Pakistan Tehreek-e-Insaf
