= Hersa Shaikh =

Town in Pakistan

Coordinates: 31.792°N 73.128°E

Hersa Shaikh is a town in Chiniot District, Punjab (Pakistan) that is home to the Nekokara people. The town has a population of over 7,000 people.

Also known as the "Place of Three Saints", which is a compound of the Persian words her, seh, and sheikh. The saints for whom the village is known for are Saadan Jawaan aka Sheikh Sa'ad (RA), Hazrat sheikh Firoz (also known as sheikh harar), and Mohammad panah, a teenager who lived in the village long ago.

His direct descendants, a group known as the Nekokara (the Pure one) mainly reside in Hersa Sheikh and the surrounding areas. The Nekokara are a tribe that claims descent from the Banu Hashim clan (the clan of the Prophet) of the Quraish. According to some traditions, the word nekokara in the local dialect of Punjabi means the “doer of good”, and was given to an ancestor of the tribe on account of some good deed. However, it is believed that they are descended from Uqeel Bin Abu Talib, the cousin of the Prophet, who was giving the name Nekokara by the Prophet.

The Nekokara are primarily concenterated in the Chiniot and Sargodha districts, with a few holding lands in the Hafizabad and Jhang districts. In Chiniot, their main villages are Hersa Sheikh, Chauntrewala, Thatta Karam Shah, Taliyal, and Zakhera.
