= Qaiser Ahmed Sheikh =

Pakistani politician

Board of Investment (Pakistan)
- Incumbent
- Assumed office 27 February 2025
- President: Asif Ali Zardari
- Prime Minister: Shehbaz Sharif
- Preceded by: Aleem Khan

Ministry of Maritime Affairs (Pakistan)
- In office 11 March 2024 – 27 February 2025
- Preceded by: Shahid Ashraf Tarar
- Succeeded by: Muhammad Junaid Anwar Chaudhry

Member of the National Assembly of Pakistan
- Incumbent
- Assumed office 29 February 2024
- Constituency: NA-94 Chiniot-II
- In office 13 August 2018 – 10 August 2023
- Constituency: NA-100 (Chiniot-II)
- In office 1 June 2013 – 31 May 2018
- Constituency: NA-86 (Jhang)
- In office 1 February 1997 – 12 October 1999
- Constituency: NA-86 (Jhang)

Personal details
- Born: 12 September 1946 (age 80)
- Party: PMLN (1993-present)

Qaiser Ahmed Sheikh (Urdu: قیصر احمد شیخ; born 12 September 1946) is a Pakistani businessman and politician who is currently serving as Chairman of the Board of Investment since 2025. Previously, he served as Federal Minister of Maritime Affairs, from 2024 to 2025. He had been a member of the National Assembly of Pakistan, from August 2018 to August 2023. Previously he was a member of the National Assembly from June 2013 to May 2018.

== Early life ==
He was born on 12 September 1946. He belongs to the Shaikh community of Chiniot, Punjab that has played a significant role in the development of trade and industry across the Indian subcontinent since the 19th century. In Pakistan, members of this community have made substantial contributions to economic activity, particularly in sectors such as textiles, chemicals, leather (tanneries), and foreign trade.

== Business career ==
Sheikh has had a long-standing career as a business executive and industrialist, marked by significant collaborations with multinational corporations. As chief executive officer, he established joint ventures that brought foreign investment and industrial growth to Pakistan. One such venture was Qaiser LG Petrochemicals (Pvt.) Ltd., a chemical manufacturing company producing Di Octyl Phthalate (D.O.P) and Butyl Acetate, formed in collaboration with the LG Group, a leading South Korean conglomerate. He also founded Qaiser Noman Bernas (Pvt.) Ltd. in partnership with Bernas, a semi-government Malaysian enterprise that holds exclusive rights to import rice into Malaysia. Under his leadership, Qaiser Noman Bernas earned multiple accolades, including export trophies from the president and prime minister of Pakistan for five consecutive years, from 2000 to 2004, recognizing its contributions to the country's export sector. These joint ventures reflect Sheikh’s role in attracting foreign investment to Pakistan, particularly in the fields of chemical manufacturing and agricultural trade.

In addition to these partnerships, Sheikh has overseen the operations of other companies. Qaiser Brothers (Pvt.) Ltd., established in 1967, is an international trading firm. He is also associated with Gadoon Industries (Pvt.) Ltd., a manufacturing company that produces plastic sheets and bags for commercial use.

He has also served as president of Karachi Chamber of Commerce and Industry.

== Political career ==
Sheikh contested elections for the National Assembly of Pakistan in the years 1993, 1997, 2002, and 2008. He was elected to the National Assembly in 1997 as an independent candidate, during an election in which only the Pakistan Muslim League-Nawaz (PML-N) secured National Assembly seats from Punjab. Notably, no other political party besides PML-N managed to win a seat in Punjab that year, making Sheikh's victory as an independent particularly significant.

He distinguished himself as one of the very few politicians with a business background to be elected from a rural constituency, traditionally dominated by feudal political families. His success in this landscape reflected a shift in voter preference and the growing influence of candidates outside the traditional political elite. As a parliamentarian, Sheikh gained recognition for his philanthropic approach to public service. He donated all of his parliamentary remuneration, travel allowances, and benefits to development initiatives in Pakistan, encouraging other financially stable members of the National Assembly to follow suit.

He was elected to the National Assembly of Pakistan as a candidate of Pakistan Muslim League (N) (PML-N) from Constituency NA-86 (Jhang) in the 2013 Pakistani general election. He received 77,512 votes and defeated Zulfiqar Ali Shah, a candidate of Pakistan People's Party (PPP).

He was re-elected to the National Assembly as a candidate of PML-N from NA-100 (Chiniot-II) in the 2018 Pakistani general election. He received 76,415 votes and defeated Zulfiqar Ali Shah, a candidate of Pakistan Tehreek-e-Insaf (PTI).
