= Sheykhan Karag =

Sheykhan Karag شيخان كرگ
- Village
- Location within Iran
- Coordinates: 25°24′32″N 61°21′06″E
- Country: Iran
- Province: Sistan and Baluchestan
- County: Chabahar
- Bakhsh: Dashtiari
- Rural District: Sand-e Mir Suiyan

Population (2006)
  - Total: 430
- Time zone: UTC+3:30 (IRST)
  - Summer (DST): UTC+4:30 (IRDT)

Sheykhan Karag (Persian: شيخان كرگ, also Romanized as Sheykhān Karag; also known as Karag and Sheykhān Gorg) is a village in Sand-e Mir Suiyan Rural District, Dashtiari District, Chabahar County, Sistan and Baluchestan Province, Iran. At the 2006 census, its population was 430, in 88 families.
