= Deh-e Sheykhan, Kohgiluyeh and Boyer-Ahmad =

Deh-e Sheykhan ده شيخان
- Village
- Country: Iran
- Province: Kohgiluyeh and Boyer-Ahmad
- County: Kohgiluyeh
- Bakhsh: Central
- Rural District: Doshman Ziari

Population (2006)
  - Total: 161
- Time zone: UTC+3:30 (IRST)
  - Summer (DST): UTC+4:30 (IRDT)

Deh-e Sheykhan (Persian: ده شيخان, also Romanized as Deh-e Sheykhān) is a village in Doshman Ziari Rural District, in the Central District of Kohgiluyeh County, Kohgiluyeh and Boyer-Ahmad Province, Iran. At the 2006 census, its population was 161, in 35 families.
