= Ghulam Muhammad Lali =

Pakistani politician

- غلام محمد لالی

Member of the National Assembly of Pakistan
- Incumbent
- Assumed office 29 February 2024
- Constituency: NA-93 Chiniot-I
- In office 13 August 2018 – 10 August 2023
- Constituency: NA-99 (Chiniot-I)
- In office 1 June 2013 – 31 May 2018
- Constituency: NA-87 (Chiniot-II Cum-Jhang)

Personal details
- Born: 4 March 1968 (age 58) Chiniot, Punjab, Pakistan
- Party: PTI (2018-present)
- Other political affiliations: PMLN (2013-2018)

Ghulam Muhammad Lali (Urdu: غلام محمد لالی; born 4 March 1968) is a Pakistani politician who has been a member of the National Assembly of Pakistan since February 2024 and previously served in this position from June 2013 till May 2018 and August 2018 till August 2023. He is also the tribal chief of the Lali clan.

== Early life ==
He was born on 4 March 1968. He completed his studies from Sargodha and Lahore.

== Political career ==
He was elected to the National Assembly of Pakistan as a candidate of Pakistan Muslim League (N) (PML-N) from Constituency NA-87 (Chiniot-II Cum-Jhang) in the 2013 Pakistani general election. He received 94,234 votes and defeated Faisal Saleh Hayat, an independent candidate.

In October 2017, he was appointed as Federal Parliamentary Secretary for Defence Production.

In June 2018, he quit PML-N and joined Pakistan Tehreek-e-Insaf (PTI).

He was re-elected to the National Assembly as a candidate of PTI from Constituency NA-99 (Chiniot-I) in the 2018 Pakistani general election. He received 81,330 votes and defeated Ghulam Abbas, an independent candidate

He was re-elected to the National Assembly as an independent candidate supported by PTI from NA-93 Chiniot-I in the 2024 Pakistani general election. He received 94,496 votes and defeated Ghulam Abbas, an independent candidate.
