= Aminpur Bangla, Faisalabad =

Pakistani town in Faisalabad District

Aminpur امین پور
- Location within Pakistan
- Coordinates: 31.49°N 72.86°E
- Country: Pakistan
- Province: Punjab
- Time zone: UTC+5 (PKT)

Aminpur Bangla (Punjabi, Urdu: امین پور بنگلہ) or simply Aminpur is a town of Faisalabad district situated on its outskirts and touching the boundary of Chiniot district of Punjab province in Pakistan.

It is the part of Faisalabad's NA-106 and PP-109 constituencies of the National Assembly of Pakistan and Provincial Assembly of Punjab, respectively.
