= Deh-e Sheykhan, Lorestan =

Deh-e Sheykhan ده شيخان
- Village
- Location within Iran
- Coordinates: 33°50′41″N 48°51′30″E
- Country: Iran
- Province: Lorestan
- County: Borujerd
- Bakhsh: Central
- Rural District: Valanjerd

Population (2006)
  - Total: 386
- Time zone: UTC+3:30 (IRST)
  - Summer (DST): UTC+4:30 (IRDT)

Deh-e Sheykhan (Persian: ده شيخان, also Romanized as Deh-e Sheykhān and Deh Shikan) is a village in Valanjerd Rural District, in the Central District of Borujerd County, Lorestan Province, Iran. At the 2006 census, its population was 386, in 101 families.
