= Makhdoom (clan) =

Punjabi tribe

Makhdoom or Makhdum is a clan found mainly in South Punjab, Pakistan.
