= Sheykhan, South Khorasan =

Sheykhan شيخان
- Village
- Location within Iran
- Coordinates: 33°02′14.7″N 59°23′05.2″E
- Country: Iran
- Province: South Khorasan
- County: Birjand
- Bakhsh: Central
- Rural District: Kahshang

Population (2016)
  - Total: 118
- Time zone: UTC+3:30 (IRST)
  - Summer (DST): UTC+4:30 (IRDT)

Sheykhan (Persian: شيخان, also Romanized as Sheykhān and Shaikhān) is a village in Kahshang Rural District, in the Central District of Birjand County, South Khorasan Province, Iran. At the 2016 census, its population was 118, in 31 families.
