= Qaleh Sheykhan =

Qaleh Sheykhan قلعه شيخان
- Village
- Location within Iran
- Coordinates: 35°28′03″N 46°39′28″E
- Country: Iran
- Province: Kurdistan
- County: Sanandaj
- Bakhsh: Kalatrazan
- Rural District: Kalatrazan

Population (2006)
  - Total: 221
- Time zone: UTC+3:30 (IRST)
  - Summer (DST): UTC+4:30 (IRDT)

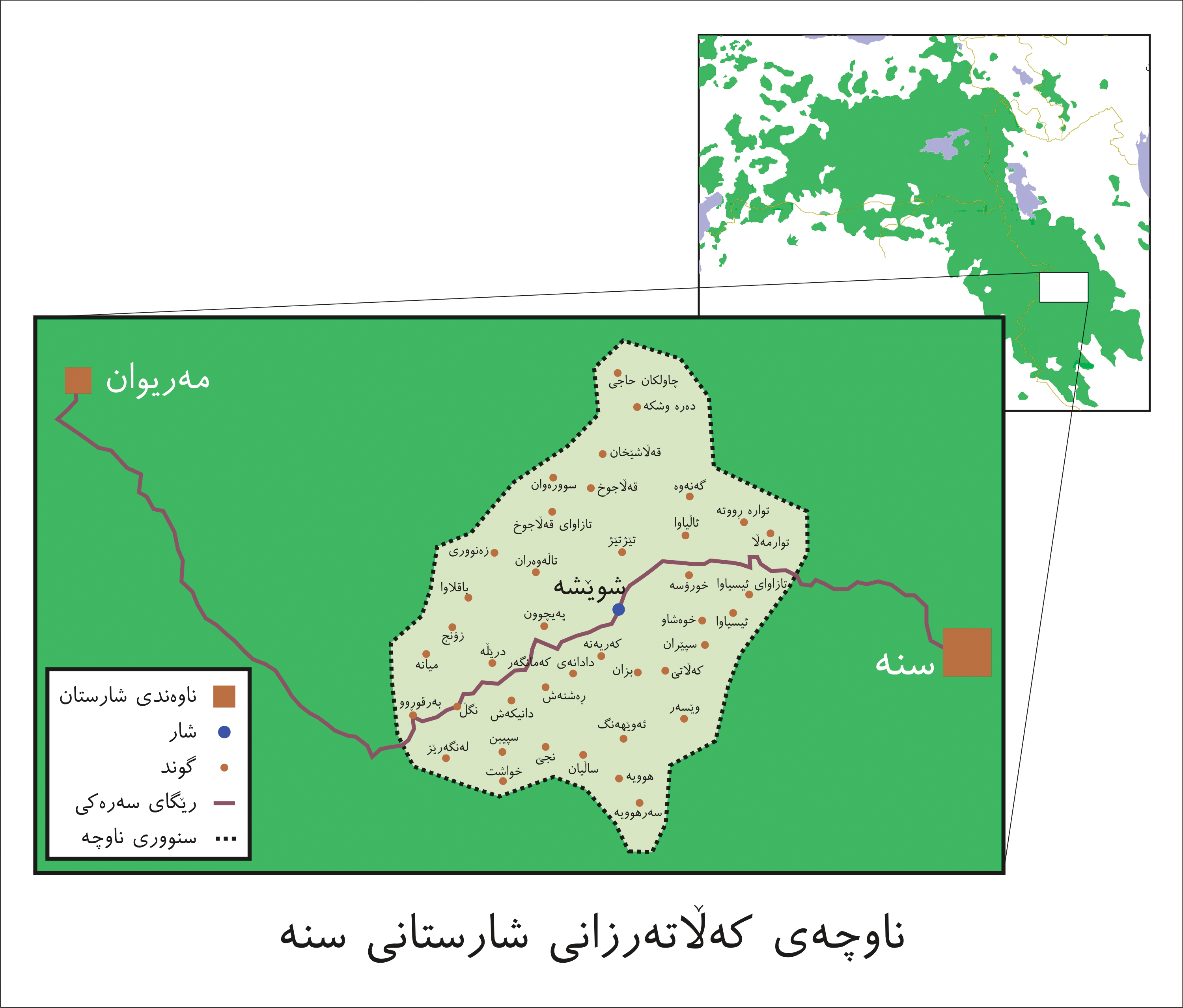

Qaleh Sheykhan (Persian: قلعه شيخان, also Romanized as Qal‘eh Sheykhān, Qal‘eh Shaikhān, and Qal‘eh-ye Sheykhān; also known as Sheykhān) is a village in Kalatrazan Rural District, Kalatrazan District, Sanandaj County, Kurdistan Province, Iran. At the 2006 census, its population was 221, in 52 families. The village is populated by Kurds.
