= Saleem Bibi Bharwana =

Pakistani politician

Member of the Provincial Assembly of the Punjab
- In office 15 August 2018 – 14 January 2023
- Constituency: PP-96 Chiniot-IV

Personal details
- Party: PTI (2018-present)
- Children: Ghulam Bibi Bharwana

Saleem Bibi Bharwana is a Pakistani politician who had been a member of the Provincial Assembly of the Punjab from August 2018 till January 2023.

== Early life ==
She was born on 1 January 1957 in Jhang, Pakistan.

== Political career ==
She was elected to the Provincial Assembly of the Punjab as a candidate of the Pakistan Tehreek-e-Insaf (PTI) from PP-96 (Chiniot-IV) in the 2018 Punjab provincial election.
