= Jhang–Chiniot Road =

Road in Pakistan

- Chiniot–Jhang Road

Route information
- Maintained by National Highway Authority
- Length: 50.3 mi (81.0 km)
- Existed: 1998–present

Major junctions
- From: Chiniot Mor
- To: Khatm-e-Nabuwat Chowk

Location
- Country: Pakistan
- Districts: Jhang and Chiniot
- Major cities: Bhawana, Chiniot and Jhang
- Towns: Jamiabad, Kheiwa, Nalka Adda and Shabbir Abad

Highway system
- Roads in Pakistan

The Jhang-Chiniot Road (or Chiniot-Jhang road) is a provincial highway in Punjab, Pakistan. The 81 km long road connects the cities of Jhang and Chiniot.

== Companies ==
Companies based along the road:

- Ramzan Sugar Mills, Bhawana

== Education ==
Educational institutions located on the road are:

- Chenab College, Chiniot (3 km besides the road)
- Chenab College, Jhang
- University of Veterinary and Animal Sciences Jhang Campus
- Ghazali Inter College, Bhawana
- Govt. High School Rashida, Rashida (10 km from Chiniot )

== Populated places ==
Cities, towns and villages situated by this road are:

- Bhawana (major city)
- Chiniot (major city)
- Jamia Abad
- Jhang (major city)
- Kheiwa
- Rashida (village)
