= Saqlain Anwar Sipra =

Pakistani politician

Member of the Provincial Assembly of the Punjab
- In office 2013 – 31 May 2018
- Constituency: PP-76 (Chiniot-IV-Cum-Jhang)
- In office 2008–2013
- Constituency: PP-75 (Jhang-III)
- In office 2002–2007
- Constituency: PP-75 (Jhang-III)

Personal details
- Born: 14 August 1977 (age 49) Jhang
- Party: Pakistan Muslim League (N) (2013-present)
- Education: Government College Lahore (GC)

Muhammad Saqlain Anwar Sipra is a Pakistani politician who had been a Member of the Provincial Assembly of the Punjab, from 2002 to May 2018.

== Early life and education ==
He was born on 14 August 1977 in Jhang.

He graduated in 1997 from Government College, Lahore and has the degree of Bachelor of Arts.

== Political career ==
He was elected to the Provincial Assembly of the Punjab as an independent candidate from Constituency PP-75 (Jhang-III) in the 2002 Pakistani general election. He received 21,708 votes and defeated Mehr Muhammad Nawaz Bharwana, a candidate of the National Alliance.

He was re-elected to the Provincial Assembly of the Punjab as a candidate of Pakistan Muslim League (Q) from Constituency PP-75 (Jhang-III) in the 2008 Pakistani general election. He received 24,298 votes and defeated Mehr Muhammad Nawaz Bharwana, an independent candidate.

He was re-elected to the Provincial Assembly of the Punjab as a candidate of Pakistan Muslim League (N) from Constituency PP-76 (Chiniot-IV-Cum-Jhang) in the 2013 Pakistani general election. In December 2013, he was appointed as Parliamentary Secretary for Auqaf and religious affairs.
