= Imtiaz Ahmad Lali =

Pakistani politician

Member of the Provincial Assembly of the Punjab
- In office 29 May 2013 – 31 May 2018

Personal details
- Born: 1 November 1957 (age 69) Chiniot, Punjab, Pakistan
- Party: JUI (F) (2025-present)
- Other political affiliations: PMLN (2013-2025)

Imtiaz Ahmad Lali is a Pakistani politician who was a Member of the Provincial Assembly of the Punjab, from May 2013 to May 2018.

== Early life and education ==
He was born on 1 November 1957 in Chiniot.

He graduated from Forman Christian College in 1977 and has a degree of Bachelor of Arts.

== Political career ==
He was elected to the Provincial assembly of the Punjab as an independent candidate in 1997 and again in 2002 from constituency [jhang-|||]. He was elected to the Provincial Assembly of the Punjab as a candidate of Pakistan Muslim League (Nawaz) from Constituency PP-75 (Jhang-III) in the 2013 Pakistani general election.
