= Lalian Tehsil =

Tehsil in Punjab, Pakistan

Lalian Tehsil تحصيل لالیاں
- Tehsil
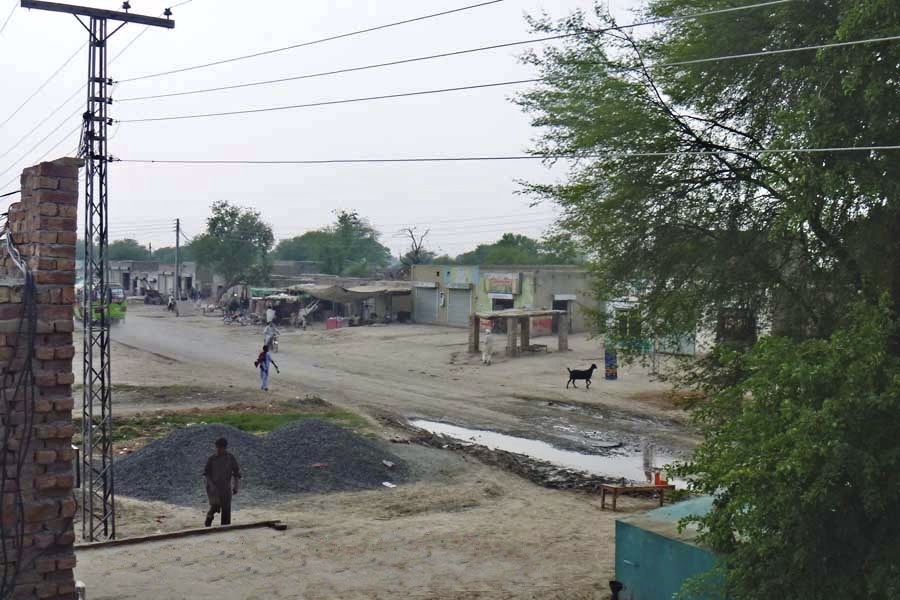

- Location in the Pakistan Lalian Tehsil (Pakistan)
- Coordinates: 31°49′31″N 72°48′10″E
- Country: Pakistan
- Province: Punjab
- District: Chiniot

Government
  - Type: Tehsil
  - City Council: Members' List: •; •; •; •; •; •; •; •; •

Population (2017)
  - Tehsil: 439,323
  - Urban: 109,714
  - Rural: 329,609
- Time zone: UTC+5 (PST)
  - Summer (DST): UTC+6 (PDT)
- Dialling code: 047

Lalian Tehsil (Urdu: تحصيل لالیاں) is a tehsil of the Chiniot District and a city in Punjab, Pakistan. It is located on Sargodha road, 22 km from Chiniot. It became a tehsil of Chiniot District on 2 February 2009. Prior to this, it was a known town in the Chiniot Tehsil and with the addition of 12 more union councils, it became a Tehsil with a large number of people in towns and villages.

== Demography ==
Punjabi is the major language of this sub-district.

Languages by number of speakers in the Lalian Tehsil
1. Punjabi (95.2%)
2. Urdu (3.00%)
3. Other (1.77%)

== See also ==
- Lalian
- Chiniot
- Chiniot District
- Bhawana
- Rabwah
