= Bhawana Tehsil =

Tehsil sub-division in Punjab, Pakistan

Bhawana Tehsil تحصیل بھوانہ Bhowana Tehsil
- Tehsil
- Location on Jhang Chiniot road, Pakistan Bhawana Tehsil (Pakistan)
- Coordinates: 31°33′58″N 72°38′46″E
- Country: Pakistan
- Province: (Punjab, Pakistan) Punjab
- District: Chiniot
- Capital: Bhawana
- Established: February 2, 2009

Government
  - Type: Tehsil Municipal Administration

Area
  - Tehsil: 879 km^{2} (339 sq mi)
  - Urban: 10 km^{2} (3.9 sq mi)
- Elevation: 157 m (515 ft)

Population (2023)
  - Tehsil: 428,617
  - Density: 488/km^{2} (1,260/sq mi)
  - Urban: 39,270 (9.16%)
  - Rural: 389,347 (90.84%)

Literacy (2023)
  - Literacy rate: 48.94%
- Time zone: UTC+5 (PST)
  - Summer (DST): UTC+6 (PDT)
- Postal code: 35350
- Dialling code: 047

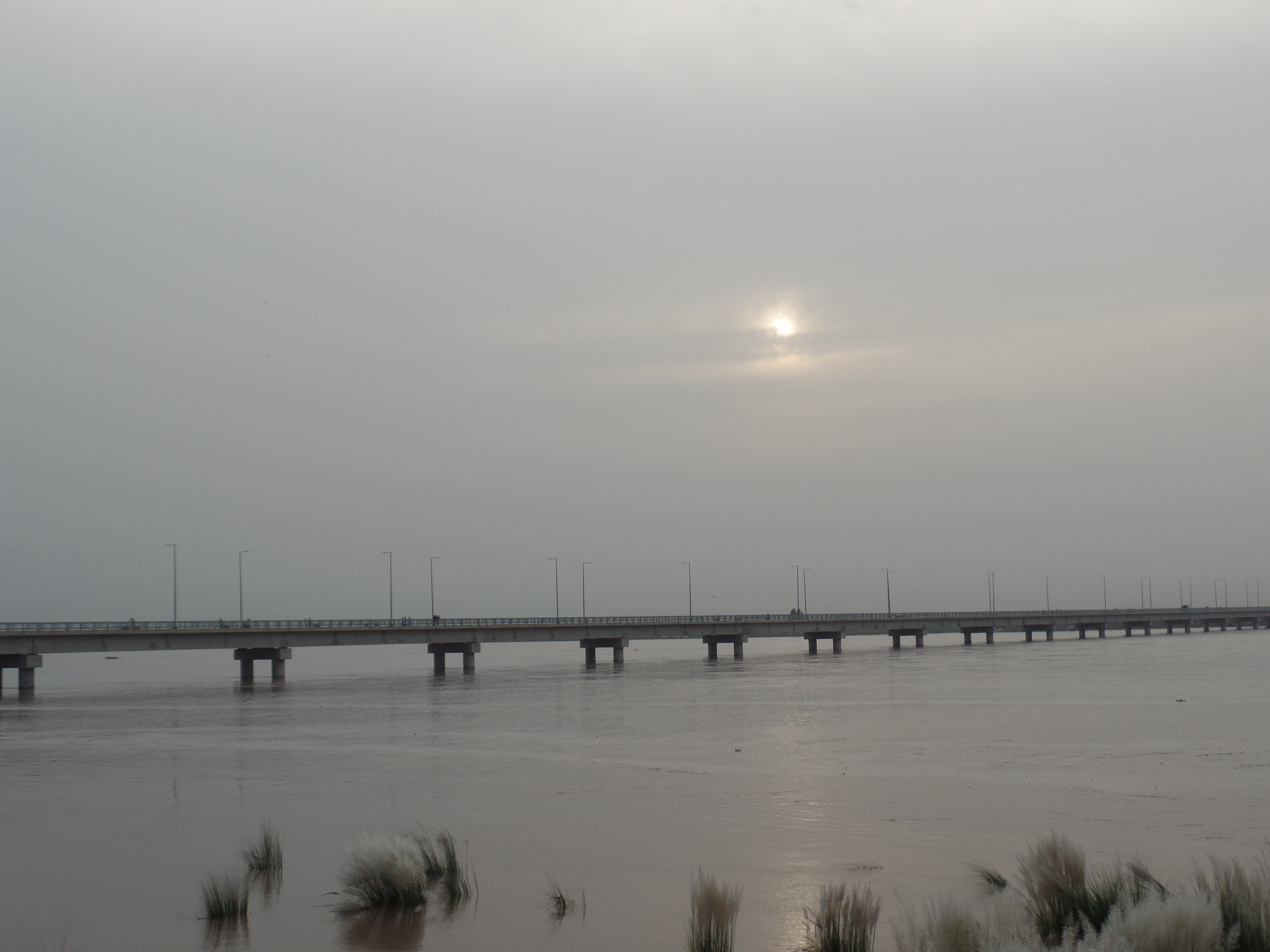
A bridge in Bhawana Tehsil over Chenab River

Bhawana (also spelled as Bhowana) (Punjabi, Urdu: تصیل بھوانہ) is a sub-division (tehsil) of Chiniot District in Punjab, Pakistan. Before February 2009, it was a part of Jhang district as a sub-division (sub-tehsil) of Chiniot Tehsil.

== Bhawana City ==
Bhawana (also spelled as Bhowana) (Punjabi: بھوآنہ, Urdu: بھوانہ) is the capital city of Bhawana Tehsil of Chiniot District. It is located on the Jhang Chiniot Road on the left bank of the Chenab river. It is situated 37 km from Chiniot, 50 km from Faisalabad, 48 km from Jhang and 70 km from Sargodha. Much like the rest of Punjab's plains, the tehsil experiences long and intense summers, and relatively short but cold winters.

== Demographics ==
=== Population ===
Historical population
Year	Pop.	±% p.a.
1951	...	—
1961	...	—
1972	...	—
1981	...	—
1998	...	—
2017	373,841	—
2023	428,617	+2.31%

As of the 2023 census, Bhawana tehsil has a population of 428,617, of which 39,270 (nearly 9.16%) is urban and 389,347 is rural.

As of the 2023 census, Bhawana Tehsil has a total literacy rate of 48.94%, with male literacy at 61.48% and female literacy at 36.07%.

== Villages and towns ==
- Harsa Buliah
- Lodhia
- Kot Sahib
- Hussain Khan
- Tibi Kamoka
- Jani Shah
- Sadev
- Hid
- Nur Allah Dad
- Adlana
- Thatta Rasalu
- Sambhal
- Fateh Kot Taja
- Shah Fateh Ali
- Thatta Kundal
- Darohata Kharlan
- Harsah Nahre
- Bulharke
- Sajjanke
- Abhulke
- Kurk Mohammadi
- Ubhan
- Malake Rajoke
- Saike Saloke
- Barkhurdar
- Kotla Shahzada
- Thatta Luna
- Saghar Wale
- Samundar
- Thatta Jhamb
- Chak No. 466/Jb
- Chak No. 189/Jb
- Thatta Fateh Ali
- Chak No. 158/Jb
- Chak No. 188/Jb
- Chak No. 156/Jb
- Chak No. 155/Jb
- Chak No. 154/Jb
- Chak No. 157/Jb
- Chak No. 234/Jb
- Chak No. 237/Jb
- Chak No. 235/Jb
- Chak No. 206/Jb
- Chak No. 236/Jb
- Chak No. 184/Jb
- Chak No. 185/Jb
- Chak No. 204/Jb
- Chak No. 197/Jb
- Chak No. 200/Jb
- Chak No. 199/Jb
- Chak No. 201/Jb
- Chak No. 207/Jb
- Chak No. 239/Jb
- Chak No. 208/Jb
- Chak No. 238/Jb
- Chak No. 186/Jb
- Chak No. 240/Jb
- Chak No. 203/Jb
- Chak No. 202/Jb
- Chak No. 249/Jb
- Chak No. 212/Jb
- Chak No. 247/Jb
- Chak No. 245/Jb
- Chak No. 205/Jb
- Chak No. 198/Jb
- Chak No. 210/Jb
- Chak No. 211/Jb
- Chak No. 209/Jb
- Chak No. 242/Jb
- Chak No. 244/Jb
- Chak No. 241/Jb
- Chak No. 243/Jb
- Chak No. 226/Jb
- Chak No. 225/Jb
- Chak No. 246/Jb
- Chak No. 227/Jb
- Chak No. 228/Jb
- Chak No.187/Jb
- Chak No.221/Jb
- Chak No.190/Jb
- Chak No.191/Jb
- Chak No.192/Jb
- Chak No.224/Jb
- Chak No.222/Jb
- Chak No.223/Jb
- Bunga
- Nitharke
- Chak No.193/Jb
- Chak No.194/Jb
- Chak No.195/Jb
- Chak No.229/Jb
- Chak No.196/Jb
- Naushehra
- Taja Barwala
- Lodhre
- Maingni
- Tahli
- Ahmad Wala
- Thatta Mohammad Shah
- Suleman
- Maral Wala

== Infrastructure ==
=== Dost Muhammad Lali Bridge ===
Tehsil also has a small bridge over Chenab River known as Dost Muhammad Lali Bridge named after former provincial assembly member Dost Muhammad Lali, father of Imtiaz Ahmad Lali and uncle of Muhammad Masood Lali and Ghulam Muhammad Lali. The bridge was in the news headlines in 2021, when a boat carrying 12 members of two families capsized in the river and only 4 people could be rescued.

=== Tehsil Headquarter Hospital ===
Tehsil also has a THQ hospital in Bhawana city. On July 26, 2023 then caretaker Chief Minister Punjab Mohsin Naqvi visited the hospital to assess the post-rain situation of the area.

=== Roads ===
- Bhawana-Aminpur Road
- Bhawana-Jhang Road
- Bhawana-Chiniot Road
- Bhawana-Painsra Road
