= Chiniot Tehsil =

Chiniot Tehsil تحصیل چنیوٹ
- Tehsil
- Country: Pakistan
- Region: (Punjab, Pakistan) Punjab
- District: Chiniot
- Tehsil capital: Chiniot
- Towns: 1
- Union councils: 44

Population (2017)
  - Tehsil: 556,147
  - Urban: 278,747
  - Rural: 277,400
- Time zone: UTC+5 (PST)
  - Summer (DST): UTC+6 (PDT)

Chiniot (Urdu: تحصیل چنیوٹ) is a tehsil of Chiniot District in the Punjab province of Pakistan.

Prior to February 2009, the area of this tehsil and the present Chiniot district was a tehsil of Jhang District. The present Chiniot tehsil is subdivided into 44 Union Councils.
