= Bhawana =

Bhawana بھوآنہ بھوانہ
- City
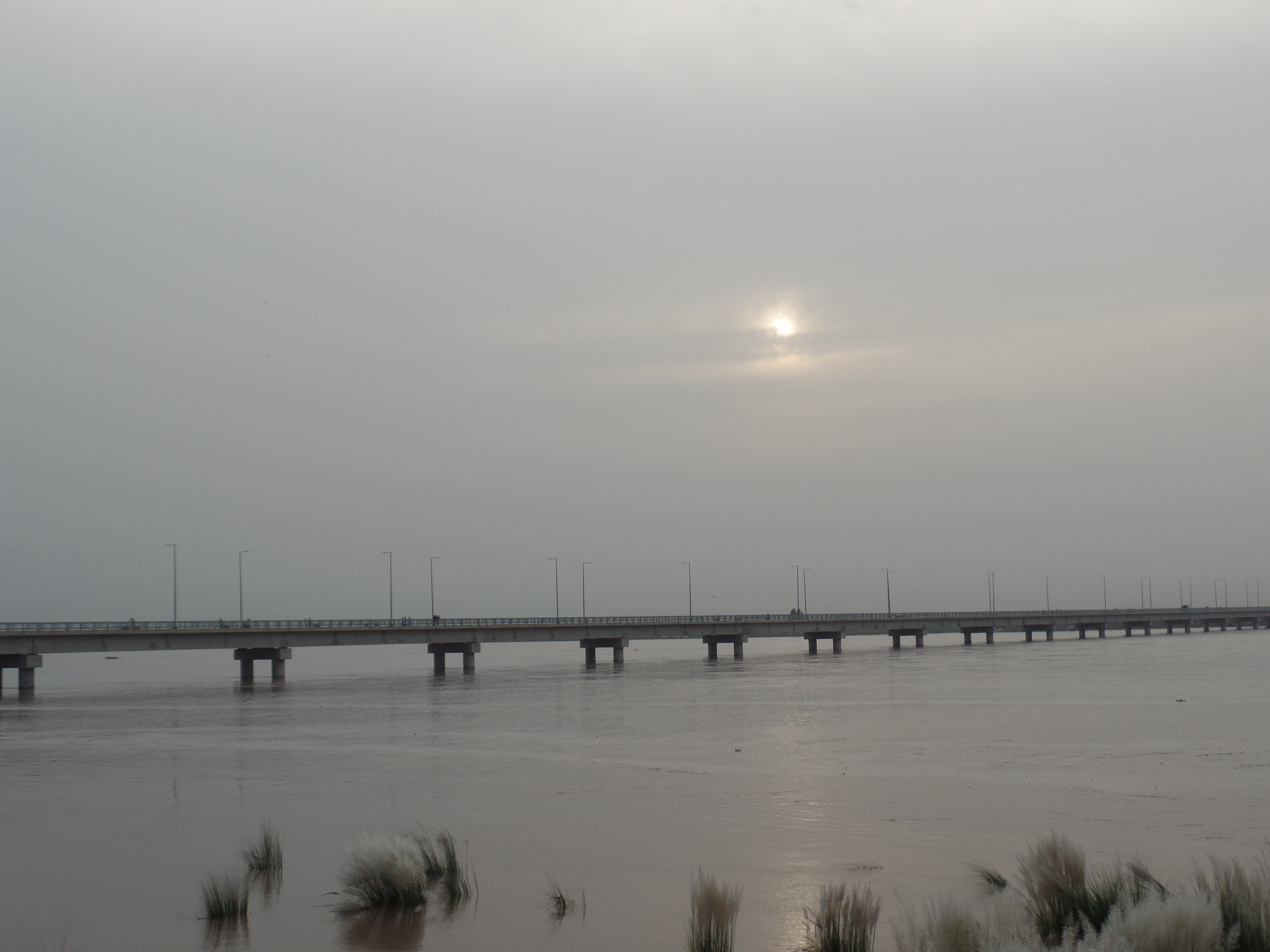
- Nickname: Bhowana
- Location in Punjab, Pakistan
- Coordinates: 31°33′58″N 72°38′46″E
- Country: Pakistan
- Province: Punjab
- District: Chiniot
- Tehsil: Bhawana
- Established: 2 February 2009

Government
  - Type: Tehsil

Area
  - City: 40 km^{2} (15 sq mi)
  - Urban: 10 km^{2} (3.9 sq mi)
- Elevation: 157 m (515 ft)

Population (2017)(Approximately)
  - City: 373,841
  - Density: 9,300/km^{2} (24,000/sq mi)
  - Urban: 265,687
- Time zone: UTC+5 (PST)
  - Summer (DST): UTC+6 (PDT)
- Postal code: 35350
- Dialling code: 047

Bhawana (also spelled as Bhowana) (Punjabi: بھوآنہ, Urdu: بھوانہ) is a city and administrative capital of Bhawana Tehsil of Chiniot District in Punjab, Pakistan. It is located on the bank of the Chenab river, bounded by the cities of Faisalabad, Jhang, and Chiniot.

== Geography and climate ==
Bhawana is located on the Jhang-Chiniot Road on the left bank of the Chenab river. Recently, with a budget of 250 million rupees, a bridge from Bhawana to Kalri has been constructed over the Chenab. The soil is fertile, and the city depends considerably on agriculture to bolster its economy. It is situated 37 km from Chiniot, 50 km from Faisalabad, 48 km from Jhang and 70 km from Sargodha. Its weather is similar to that of much of the plains of Punjab, with long and intense summers, and relatively short but cold winters.

== See also ==
- Economy of Faisalabad
- List of schools in Pakistan
- Mandi Shah Jeewna
- Sheikhan
- Sial Sharif
- Sultan Bahu
