= Chiniot District =

District in Punjab, Pakistan

Coordinates: 31°43′12″N 72°58′48″E

Chiniot District ضلع چنیوٹ
- District of Punjab
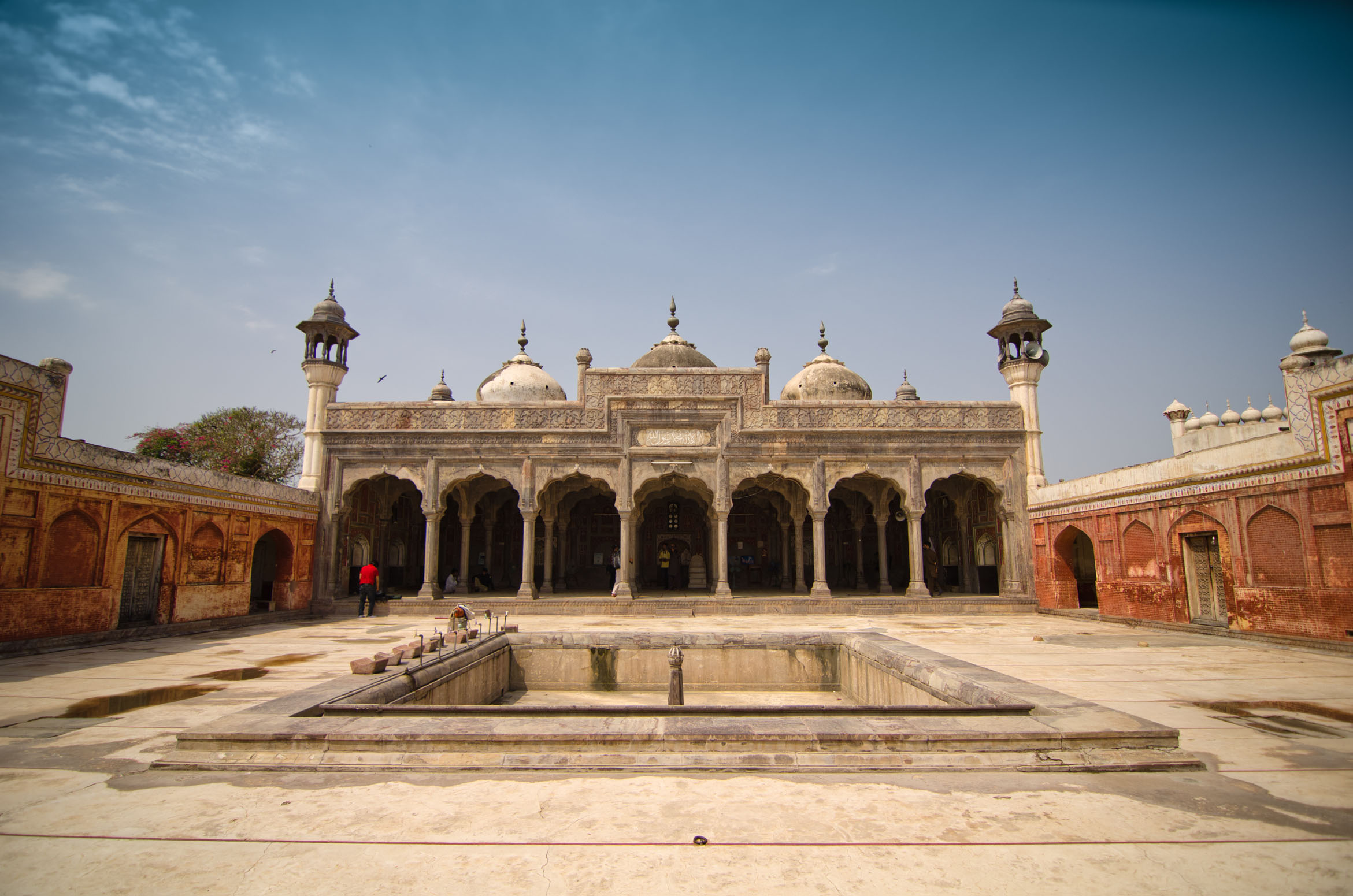
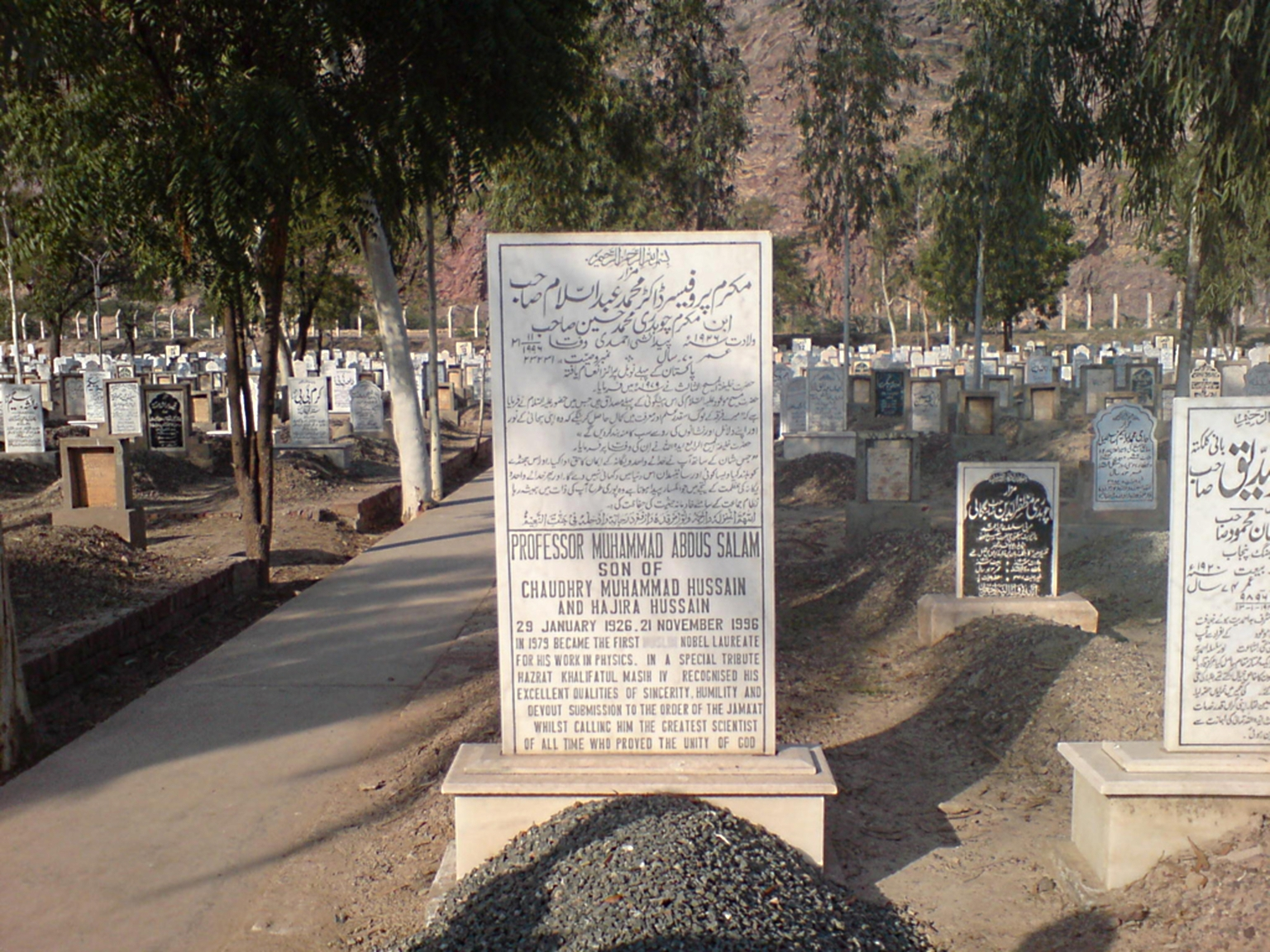
- Top: Shahi Masjid, Chiniot; Bottom: Grave of Abdus Salam

- Map of Punjab with Chiniot District highlighted
- Country: Pakistan
- Province: Punjab
- Division: Faisalabad Division
- Established: 1 July 2009
- Headquarters: Chiniot

Government
  - Type: District Administration
  - Deputy Commissioner: Ayesha Rizwan
  - District Police Officer: Dr. Naveed Atif
  - CEO District Health Authority: Dr. Saqib Munir
  - District Health Officer: Dr. Mursaleen

Area
  - District of Punjab: 2,643 km^{2} (1,020 sq mi)

Population (2023)
  - District of Punjab: 1,563,024
  - Density: 591.4/km^{2} (1,532/sq mi)
  - Urban: 491,672 (31.45%)
  - Rural: 1,071,352 (68.55%)

Literacy
  - Literacy rate: Total: (55.05%); Male: (64.64%); Female: (45.19%)
- Time zone: UTC+5 (PST)
- Area code: 0466
- Number of Tehsils: 3
- Website: chiniot.punjab.gov.pk

Chiniot District (Punjabi and Urdu: ضلع چنيوٹ), is a district in the Punjab province of Pakistan. It became the district in July 2009. Before this, it was a tehsil of Jhang District.

== History ==
Chiniot region was an agricultural region with forests during the Indus Valley civilization. The Vedic period is characterized by Indo-Aryan culture that migrated from Central Asia and settled in Punjab region. The Kambojas, Daradas, Kaikayas, Madras, Pauravas, Yaudheyas, Malavas and Kurus invaded, settled and ruled ancient Punjab region. After overrunning the Achaemenid Empire in 331 BCE, Alexander marched into present-day Punjab region with an army of 50,000. The Chiniot region was ruled by Maurya Empire, Indo-Greek kingdom, Kushan Empire, Gupta Empire, White Huns, Kushano-Hephthalites and Shahi kingdoms.

In 997 CE, Sultan Mahmud Ghaznavi, took over the Ghaznavid dynasty empire established by his father, Sultan Sebuktegin. In 1005, he conquered the Shahis in Kabul in 1005, and followed it by the conquests of Punjab region. The Delhi Sultanate and later Mughal Empire ruled the region. The Punjab region became predominantly Muslim due to missionary Sufi saints whose dargahs dot the landscape of Punjab region.

After the decline of the Mughal Empire, the Sikh Empire conquered Narowal District. The Muslims faced restrictions during the Sikh rule. The British took over Chiniot District in 1848.

The predominantly Muslim population supported Muslim League and Pakistan Movement. After the independence of Pakistan in 1947, the minority Hindus and Sikhs migrated to India while the Muslim refugees from India settled in the Chiniot District.

"Chiniot" name is from Chandan Khan (sister of Malik Machchhe Khan), Raja of Chiniot, a Khokhar rajput clan. Mari tappa (founded by the rajput Raja Badal Khan Khokhar) was not then populated, but Andheri was flourishing, and north of it lay the Dhaular, or abode of Rani Chandan, which was called Chandniot, now Chiniot. Or some say its name is based on as, literally "OT" (Behind/Across) of "CHIN-ab river", hence Chiniot. According to Sir Denzil Ibbetson. Panjab Castes, A glossary of tribes and castes of Punjab by H.D. ROSE. Chiniot was known for its master crafted furniture, not only in Pakistan, but all over the world. Its highly special and master craft Jharokhas are known in the whole country.

On 1 July 2009, Chief Minister Shahbaz Sharif formally approved the creation of Chiniot as the 36th district of Punjab province on behalf of MPA IMTIAZ AHMAD LALI & Molana Ilyas Ahmed Chinioti. Calls for Chiniot to be made a district date back to 2005, when a movement was a launched to elevate the former tehsil to district level. The movement died down when the public were assured the next Nazim would be from Chiniot – however this was not to be the case.

== Administration ==
The district is administratively divided into the following tehsils (subdivisions):

Tehsil	Area (km²)	Pop. (2023)	Density (ppl/km²) (2023)	Literacy rate (2023)	Union Councils
Bhowana	879	428,617	487.62	48.94%	...
Chiniot	709	633,621	893.68	57.31%	...
Lalian	1,055	500,786	474.68	57.26%	...

== Demographics ==
=== Population ===
Historical population
Year	Pop.	±% p.a.
1951	329,615	—
1961	396,948	+1.88%
1972	570,775	+3.36%
1981	694,080	+2.20%
1998	965,124	+1.96%
2017	1,368,659	+1.86%
2023	1,563,024	+2.24%

As of the 2023 census, Chiniot district has 256,438 households and a population of 1,563,024. The district has a sex ratio of 102.41 males to 100 females and a literacy rate of 55.05%: 64.64% for males and 45.19% for females. 417,070 (26.68% of the surveyed population) are under 10 years of age. 491,672 (31.46%) live in urban areas.

=== Religion ===
Religion in Chiniot district (2023)
Religion	Percent
Islam	95.35%
Ahmadiyya	4.3%
Christianity	0.33%
Other	0.02%

Muslims are the majority community in the district. Unlike the rest of Pakistan, Chiniot district has a sizeable Ahmadi community as the location of Rabwah, the main settlement of the Ahmadis after Partition.

Religion in contemporary Chiniot District
Religious group	1941		2017		2023	
Religious group	Pop.	%	Pop.	%	Pop.	%
Islam	276,745	86.98%	1,306,663	95.47%	1,490,359	95.35%
Hinduism (Note: 1941 census: Including Ad-Dharmis)	39,219	12.33%	62	0%	132	0.01%
Sikhism	2,188	0.69%	—N/a	—N/a	14	0%
Christianity	23	0.01%	2,174	0.16%	5,211	0.33%
Ahmadi (Note: Ahmadis were declared non-Muslims in Pakistan prior to the 1972 census and from then have been enumerated separately.)	—N/a	—N/a	59,748	4.37%	67,223	4.3%
Others (Note: Including Jainism, Buddhism, Zoroastrianism, Judaism, or not stated)	8	0%	12	0%	85	0.01%
Total Population	318,183	100%	1,368,659	100%	1,563,024	100%
Note: 1941 census data is for Chiniot tehsil of erstwhile Jhang district, which roughly corresponds to contemporary Chiniot district. District and tehsil borders have changed since 1941.

=== Language ===
Languages of Chiniot district (2023)
1. Punjabi (95.1%)
2. Urdu (3.41%)
3. Pashto (1.14%)
4. Others (0.37%)

At the time of the 2023 census, 95.08% of the population spoke Punjabi, 3.41% Urdu and 1.14% Pashto as their first language.

== Fauna and flora ==
The fauna and flora of the district include: Jand trees (Prosopis spicigera), Karir (Capparis aphylla), Beri (Ziziphus jujuba), Van (Salvadora abeoides), Kikar (Acacia arabica), Shisham (Dalbergia ) and Aak (Calotropis hamiltoni) are found within the district.

== Architecture ==
The Omar Hayat Mahal (also known as Gulzar Manzil), is a 19th-century palace in Chiniot. (Badshahi Masjid) it was built by Nawab Saad Ullah Khan who was minister of Shah Jahan. It has same architecture as Shahi Masjid Lahore. Nawab Saad Ullah was minister in the cabinet of the Mughal Empire.

Important Village: Bhowana is one of the most famous towns of Chiniot District due to its ability to produce many Civil Service of Pakistan officers.

== Towns ==
- Hersa Shaikh

Fateh Kot taja

== See also ==
- Chiniot
- Faisalabad Division
- Chiniot railway station
- Chenab College, Chiniot
- Districts of Pakistan
- Punjab, Pakistan
- Sangla Hill–Kundian Branch Line
