= List of libraries in Pakistan =

This is a list of major libraries in Pakistan.

== Libraries ==
Libraries in Pakistan
Library	City/Town	Province/Region	Neighborhood / Address	Affiliation / Owner	Type	Founded	Notes/References
Al-Firdous Baldia Public Library	Karachi	Sindh	Chandni Chowk, Baldia Town	District Municipal Corporation (DMC) West (municipal)	Public	c. 1985	Built in the mid-1980s; municipal library under local government.
Al-Huda Library	Karachi	Sindh	Nazimabad (UC-11, Liaquatabad Town)	City District Government Karachi / DMC Central (municipal)	Public (Women)	2005	The first women's library established at Nazimabad UC-11; also listed among municipal libraries.
Allama Iqbal Library	Karachi	Sindh	—	District Municipal Corporation (DMC) East (municipal)	Public	—	Listed as a municipal library under DMC East.
Allama Shabir Ahmad Usmani Library	Karachi	Sindh	Nazimabad	District Municipal Corporation (DMC) Central (municipal)	Public	—	Appears in municipal list for DMC Central.
Bedil Library	Karachi	Sindh	Sharfabad, Gulshan Town	Community / volunteer-run	Public	1974	
Board of Intermediate Karachi Library	Karachi	Sindh	North Nazimabad	Board of Intermediate Education Karachi	Government / Board	—	
Central Library, Korangi No.5	Karachi	Sindh	Korangi No.5	District Municipal Corporation (DMC) Korangi (municipal)	Public	2017 (model library inaugurated)	Mayor inaugurated a new "model library" in Korangi; municipal libraries are run by DMCs.
Children Library	Karachi	Sindh	Nazimabad	Karachi Municipal Corporation (municipal)	Public (Children)	—	Karachi's public/children's libraries fall under the city administration/KMC.
Defence Central Library (DHA)	Karachi	Sindh	Sunset Boulevard, Phase II, DHA	Defence Housing Authority	Public / Membership	1991	
Mahmood Hussain Central Library	Karachi	Sindh	University of Karachi, Gulshan Town	University of Karachi	University	1952	
Faiz-e-Aam Library	Karachi	Sindh	Lyari Town	District Municipal Corporation (DMC) South (municipal)	Public	—	Listed among DMC South's municipal libraries.
Ghalib Library	Karachi	Sindh	Nazimabad	—	Public	1971 (opened); 1972 (inaugurated)	
Ghulam Husain Khaliq Dina Hall Library	Karachi	Sindh	Saddar Town	Karachi Metropolitan Corporation	Public	—	See Khaliq Dina Hall.
Hashim Gazder Library	Karachi	Sindh	Jamila Street, Ranchore Lines	District Municipal Corporation (DMC) South	Public	—	
Hasrat Mohani Library	Karachi	Sindh	Liaquatabad No.9, Liaquatabad	Municipal (Liaquatabad Town / DMC Central)	Public	—	
Hungorabad Library	Karachi	Sindh	Hungorabad, Lyari Town	—	Public	—	Listed among Lyari’s major libraries.
Iqbal Shaheed Library	Karachi	Sindh	Behar Colony, Lyari Town	—	Public	—	Noted among Lyari’s long-standing local libraries.
Iqra Library	Karachi	Sindh	New Kumhar Wara, Lyari Town	—	Public	—	Listed among Lyari’s major libraries.
Jehangir Park Reading Room Library	Karachi	Sindh	Jehangir Park, Saddar Town	Karachi Metropolitan Corporation	Public / Reading Room	—	
Karachi Metropolitan Corporation Library	Karachi	Sindh	Shahrah-e-Liaquat, Saddar Town	Karachi Metropolitan Corporation	Public	—	Identified historically as the Frere Market/KMC public library on Shahrah-e-Liaquat.
KMC Children Library	Karachi	Sindh	near Hadi Market, Nazimabad	Karachi Metropolitan Corporation	Public (Children)	—	
Kutub Khana Khas Anjuman-e-Taraqqi-e-Urdu Pakistan	Karachi	Sindh	Baba-e-Urdu Road, Saddar Town	Anjuman Taraqqi-i-Urdu	Research / Cultural	—	
Liaquat Hall Library	Karachi	Sindh	Abdullah Haroon Road, Saddar Town	Karachi Metropolitan Corporation	Public	—	
Liaquat Memorial Library	Karachi	Sindh	Stadium Road, Gulshan Town	Culture, Tourism, Antiquities & Archives Dept., Government of Sindh	Public	1950	
Lyari Municipal Library	Karachi	Sindh	Old Slaughter House, Lyari Town	Karachi Metropolitan Corporation (Municipal)	Public	—	
Lyari Text Book Library	Karachi	Sindh	Chakiwara, Lyari Town	—	Public / Textbook	—	It is popularly known as the Mulla Fazil Hall Library and serves students needing textbooks.
Main Library, Aga Khan University	Karachi	Sindh	Stadium Road, Gulshan Town	Aga Khan University	University	—	
Main Library, Hamdard University	Karachi	Sindh	Madinat al-Hikmat, Muhammad Bin Qasim Ave.	Hamdard University	University	1989	It is among the city’s largest academic libraries.
Main Library, NED University of Engineering & Technology	Karachi	Sindh	University Road	NED University of Engineering & Technology	University	—	
Moosa Lane Reading Room Library	Karachi	Sindh	Moosa Lane, Lyari Town	—	Public / Reading Room	—	Listed among Lyari’s network of local libraries/reading rooms.
Moulana Hasrat Mohani Library	Karachi	Sindh	Usmanabad, Lyari Town	District Municipal Corporation South (Karachi)	Public	—	
Mujahid Park Library	Karachi	Sindh	Rexer Line, Lyari Town	District Municipal Corporation South (Karachi)	Public	—	
Nasir-Arif Hussain Memorial Library & Research Center	Karachi	Sindh	Gulberg Town	Khidmat-i-Khalq Foundation (KKF)	Public / Research	2011	
National Book Foundation Library	Karachi	Sindh	Braille Complex Building, near PTV Station, Stadium Road	National Book Foundation	Public	—	
Nawa Lane Library	Karachi	Sindh	Gabol Park, Lyari Town	District Municipal Corporation South (Karachi)	Public	—	
Noorani Welfare Library	Karachi	Sindh	Ranchore Line, Lyari Town	—	Public	—	
Pakistan Arab Cultural Association Library	Karachi	Sindh	Iftikhar Chambers, Altaf Road	Pakistan Arab Cultural Association	Cultural	—	
Rangoon Wala Hall & Community Centre Library	Karachi	Sindh	Dhoraji Colony	Rangoonwala Trust	Public / Community	—	
Sardar Abdul-Rab Nishtar Library	Karachi	Sindh	near Lyari General Hospital, Lyari Town	District Municipal Corporation South (Karachi)	Public	—	
Satellite Library	Karachi	Sindh	Sango Lane, Lyari Town	District Municipal Corporation South (Karachi)	Public	—	
Kharader Library and Reading Room	Karachi	Sindh	Kharadar	Ismaili community	Community / Academic	1908	First Ismaili library in Karachi; also associated with Kharadar Ismaili Jamat Khana.
Sheikh Mufeed Library	Karachi	Sindh	Islamic Research Center, Allama Ibne Hassan Jarchvi Road, Federal B. Area	Islamic Culture & Research Trust (ICRT)	Research / Religious	—	
Shohada-e-Pakistan Library	Karachi	Sindh	Usmanabad, Lyari Town	District Municipal Corporation South (Karachi)	Public	—	
Sindh Archives	Karachi	Sindh	Clifton Town	Government of Sindh	Archives	—	—
Super Market Library	Karachi	Sindh	Super Market, Liaquatabad	Karachi Metropolitan Corporation (District Central)	Public	—	
Taimuriya Library	Karachi	Sindh	North Nazimabad (Block L, Shahrah-e-Sher Shah Suri)	District Central Administration (municipal)	Public	—	
Umer Lane Library	Karachi	Sindh	Umer Lane, Lyari Town	District Municipal Corporation (DMC) South	Public	—	
Abdul Karim Gadai Municipal Library	Jacobabad	Sindh	Municipal Committee Building	Municipal Committee, Jacobabad	Public	1988	
H.M. Khoja Library	Nawabshah (Benazirabad)	Sindh	—	District Administration, Shaheed Benazirabad	Public	—	
Central Library, QUEST University	Nawabshah (Benazirabad)	Sindh	Main Campus, Sakrand Road (near Multipurpose Hall)	Quaid-e-Awam University of Engineering, Science & Technology	University	—	
Main Library, University of Agriculture	Peshawar	Khyber Pakhtunkhwa	—	The University of Agriculture, Peshawar	University	—	
Main Library, University of Engineering & Technology	Peshawar	Khyber Pakhtunkhwa	—	University of Engineering and Technology, Peshawar	University	—	
Main Library, University of Peshawar	Peshawar	Khyber Pakhtunkhwa	—	University of Peshawar	University	—	
Islamia College University Central Library	Peshawar	Khyber Pakhtunkhwa	—	Islamia College University	University	—	
PDA Public Library	Peshawar	Khyber Pakhtunkhwa	Hayatabad	Peshawar Development Authority	Public	—	
Mardan Public Library	Mardan	Khyber Pakhtunkhwa	Directorate of Archives, Shami Road	Directorate of Archives & Libraries KP	Public	1990	
Jinnah Municipal Library	Kohat	Khyber Pakhtunkhwa	Shah Faisal Gate	Municipal Committee	Public	—	
Main Library, Ghulam Ishaq Khan Institute	Topi (Swabi)	Khyber Pakhtunkhwa	—	GIKI	University	—	
Municipal Committee Library	Mansehra	Khyber Pakhtunkhwa	Upper Kashmir Road (housed in former 1937 gurdwara building)	Municipal Committee	Public	—	
Municipal Public Library	Mingora (Swat)	Khyber Pakhtunkhwa	—	Municipal Committee	Public	—	
Swat Public Library	Swat	Khyber Pakhtunkhwa	—	Directorate of Archives & Libraries KP	Public	—	
Peshawar Public Library	Peshawar	Khyber Pakhtunkhwa	—	Directorate of Archives & Libraries KP	Public	—	
Mardan Public Library (District)	Mardan	Khyber Pakhtunkhwa	—	Directorate of Archives & Libraries KP	Public	—	
Abbottabad Public Library (District)	Abbottabad	Khyber Pakhtunkhwa	Jalal Baba Auditorium Complex	Directorate of Archives & Libraries KP	Public	—	
Kohat Public Library (District)	Kohat	Khyber Pakhtunkhwa	—	Directorate of Archives & Libraries KP	Public	—	
Ghazi Public Library	Ghazi	Khyber Pakhtunkhwa	—	Directorate of Archives & Libraries KP	Public	—	—
Swabi Public Library	Swabi	Khyber Pakhtunkhwa	—	Directorate of Archives & Libraries KP	Public	—	—
Khushal Khan Khattak Memorial Library	Akora Khattak	Khyber Pakhtunkhwa	—	—	Public / Memorial	—	—
Chitral Public Library	Chitral	Khyber Pakhtunkhwa	—	Directorate of Archives & Libraries KP	Public	—	—
Iqbal Municipal Library	Murree	Punjab	—	Municipal Committee	Public	—	—
Masood Jhandir Research Library	Mailsi (Vehari)	Punjab	—	Private / Research	Research	—	—
Omar Hayat Mahal Library	Chiniot	Punjab	Omar Hayat Mahal	Municipal / Cultural	Public	—	—
Central Library Bahawalpur	Bahawalpur	Punjab	—	Municipal / Govt. of Punjab	Public	—	—
e-Library, Bahawalpur	Bahawalpur	Punjab	—	Punjab IT Board & Sports Board Punjab	Digital / Public	—	
Allama Iqbal Library	Faisalabad	Punjab	—	Municipal	Public	—	
Municipal Library	Faisalabad	Punjab	—	Municipal	Public	—	
Central Library, University of Agriculture, Faisalabad	Faisalabad	Punjab	—	University of Agriculture, Faisalabad	University	—	—
e-Library, Faisalabad	Faisalabad	Punjab	—	Punjab IT Board & Sports Board Punjab	Digital / Public	—	
Chenab Club Library	Faisalabad	Punjab	—	Chenab Club	Membership	—	—
POF Central Library	Taxila / Wah Cantt.	Punjab	Wah Cantt.	Pakistan Ordnance Factories	Institutional	—	—
F.G. Degree College Library	Taxila / Wah Cantt.	Punjab	Wah Cantt.	Federal Government Degree College	College	—	—
Station Library, Heavy Industries Taxila Cantt	Taxila / HIT	Punjab	HIT Cantt.	Heavy Industries Taxila	Institutional	—	—
Govt. Public Library	Toba Tek Singh	Punjab	Iqbal Bazaar	Municipal	Public	—	—
e-Library, Toba Tek Singh	Toba Tek Singh	Punjab	—	Punjab IT Board & Sports Board Punjab	Digital / Public	—	
Atomic Energy Minerals Centre Library	Lahore	Punjab	—	Pakistan Atomic Energy Commission	Institutional	—	—
Babar Ali Library	Lahore	Punjab	Aitchison College	Aitchison College	College	—	—
Dr Baqir's Library	Lahore	Punjab	—	—	Private / Public	—	—
Dyal Singh Trust Library	Lahore	Punjab	—	Dyal Singh Trust	Public	1908	Established per will of Sardar Dyal Singh Majithia.
The Ewing Memorial Library	Lahore	Punjab	Forman Christian College	Forman Christian College (A Chartered University)	University	1943	—
Government College Library	Lahore	Punjab	Government College University, Lahore	GCU Lahore	University	—	—
Islamia College Library	Lahore	Punjab	Islamia College (Lahore)	Islamia College	College	—	—
Lahore University of Management Sciences Library	Lahore	Punjab	Lahore University of Management Sciences	LUMS	University	—	—
Library Information Services, CIIT Lahore	Lahore	Punjab	—	CIIT Lahore	University	—	
National Library of Engineering Sciences	Lahore	Punjab	UET Lahore	UET Lahore	University	—	
Pakistan Administrative Staff College Library	Lahore	Punjab	—	National School of Public Policy	Institutional	—	—
People's Bank Library	Lahore	Punjab	—	—	Institutional	—	—
Provincial Assembly of the Punjab Library	Lahore	Punjab	—	Provincial Assembly of the Punjab	Legislative	—	—
Punjab Public Library, Lahore	Lahore	Punjab	—	Govt. of Punjab	Public	—	—
Punjab University Library	Lahore	Punjab	University of the Punjab	University of the Punjab	University	—	—
Quaid-e-Azam Library	Lahore	Punjab	Bagh-e-Jinnah	Govt. of Punjab	Public	—	—
e-Library, Lahore	Lahore	Punjab	—	Punjab IT Board & Sports Board Punjab	Digital / Public	—	
Government Jinnah Public Library	Sahiwal	Punjab	—	Municipal	Public	—	—
e-Library, Sahiwal	Sahiwal	Punjab	—	Punjab IT Board & Sports Board Punjab	Digital / Public	—	
Government Urdu Adab Library	Sahiwal	Punjab	—	Municipal	Public	—	—
Jinnah Hall Library	Sargodha	Punjab	—	Municipal	Public	—	—
Central Library, University of Sargodha	Sargodha	Punjab	—	University of Sargodha	University	—	
e-Library, Sargodha	Sargodha	Punjab	—	Punjab IT Board & Sports Board Punjab	Digital / Public	—	
Garrison Public Library	Multan	Punjab	—	Pakistan Army / Garrison	Public	—	—
e-Library, Multan	Multan	Punjab	—	Punjab IT Board & Sports Board Punjab	Digital / Public	—	
Municipal Library Rawalpindi	Rawalpindi	Punjab	—	Municipal	Public	—	—
Cantonment Public Library	Rawalpindi	Punjab	—	Rawalpindi Cantonment Board	Public	—	—
BUITEMS Library	Quetta	Balochistan	Quetta	BUITEMS	University	—	—
Cantonment Public Library	Quetta	Balochistan	Shahrah-e-Aziz Bhatti	Cantonment Board	Public	—	—
Quaid-e-Azam Library	Quetta	Balochistan	—	Municipal / Govt. of Balochistan	Public	—	—
Main Library, University of Balochistan	Quetta	Balochistan	—	University of Balochistan	University	—	—
Library of Cadet College Mastung	Mastung	Balochistan	—	Cadet College Mastung	Military College	—	—
Municipal Public Library	Mastung	Balochistan	—	Municipal Committee	Public	—	—
Sarawan Digital Library	Mastung	Balochistan	—	—	Digital / Public	—	—
LUAWMS Library	Lasbela	Balochistan	—	LUAWMS	University	—	—
Sassuli Library	Winder	Balochistan	Winder	—	Public	—	—
Molana Abdul Haq Library	Turbat (Kech)	Balochistan	Turbat	—	Public	—	—
PHRC Central Library	Islamabad	Islamabad Capital Territory	—	Pakistan Health Research Council	Institutional	—	
National Library of Pakistan	Islamabad	Islamabad Capital Territory	—	Cabinet Division / Government of Pakistan	National Library	—	
Islamabad Public Library	Islamabad	Islamabad Capital Territory	—	Metropolitan Corporation Islamabad	Public	—	
Islamabad Community Library	Islamabad	Islamabad Capital Territory	Sector F-11 Markaz	MCI / Community	Public	—	
Islamabad Community Library	Islamabad	Islamabad Capital Territory	Sector G-7, near Iqbal Hall	MCI / Community	Public	—	
Islamabad Community Library	Islamabad	Islamabad Capital Territory	Sector G-8/2	MCI / Community	Public	—	
Islamabad Community Library	Islamabad	Islamabad Capital Territory	Sector G-11 Markaz	MCI / Community	Public	—	
Islamabad Community Library	Islamabad	Islamabad Capital Territory	Sector I-8 Markaz	MCI / Community	Public	—	
Islamabad Community Library	Islamabad	Islamabad Capital Territory	Sector I-10/1	MCI / Community	Public	—	
ISSI Library	Islamabad	Islamabad Capital Territory	Institute of Strategic Studies, Atatürk Ave., F-5/2	Institute of Strategic Studies, Islamabad	Institutional	—	—
National Library of Agricultural Science (NARC)	Islamabad	Islamabad Capital Territory	NARC, Park Road, Chack Shahzad	Pakistan Agricultural Research Council	Research	1982	

== See also ==
- Copyright law of Pakistan
- List of libraries in Lahore
- Library associations in Pakistan
- List of archives in Pakistan
- Mass media in Pakistan
- List of libraries
