= Cantonment Public Library =

Public library in Pakistan

- 33.59628°N 73.04611°E
- Location: Mall Road, Rawalpindi Cantonment, Punjab, Pakistan, Pakistan
- Type: Public
- Established: 1891

Collection
- Items collected: Books
- Size: 50,000

Access and use
- Population served: 2,098,231
- Members: 1500

Cantonment Public Library (Urdu: کتابخانه عامه کنٹونمنٹ), formerly known as Lansdowne Trust Library, is a public library in Rawalpindi, Pakistan. It was established in 1891 and has a collection of around 50,000 books and 1500 members.

== History ==
In 1891, two brothers, Sardar Kirpal Singh Rai Bahadar and Sardar Sujan Singh Rai Bahadar, established a trust known as The Lansdowne Trust in the Rawalpindi Cantonment. The trust laid the foundation of the Odeon Cinema, Shah Baloot Park, and a library. The library was originally given the name Lansdowne Trust Library in honor of the viceroy Lord Henry Petty-Fitzmaurice, 5th Marquess of Lansdowne. In the beginning, it was located at a place on the Kashmir road, but later in 1980, was shifted to its current place on the Mall. The library started with a collection of 5,000 books. In 1983, the president Zia-ul-Haq provided Rs1.8 million for the renovation of the library building.

In 2022, a controversy was raised when the Rawalpindi Cantonment Board converted the main hall of the library into a computer office and erased the 124-year-old library's name from the building without any prior approval from the Lansdowne Trust.

== Services and facilities ==
More than 50,000 books on various subjects, including 25,000 in English and 25,000 in Urdu, are currently held in the library. There are 300 active members and 1500 general members. However, due to a lack of patron interest and inadequate facilities, the library's membership is on decline.

The library's upper level and ground floor are set aside for study and research purposes, with separated parts for English and Urdu. It has a separate room for ladies and children. Additionally to Braille for blind learners, the library also provides books for special individuals.

== See also ==
- List of libraries in Pakistan
