= List of libraries in Lahore =

This is a list of libraries located in Lahore, Pakistan. It includes both public lending libraries and research libraries.

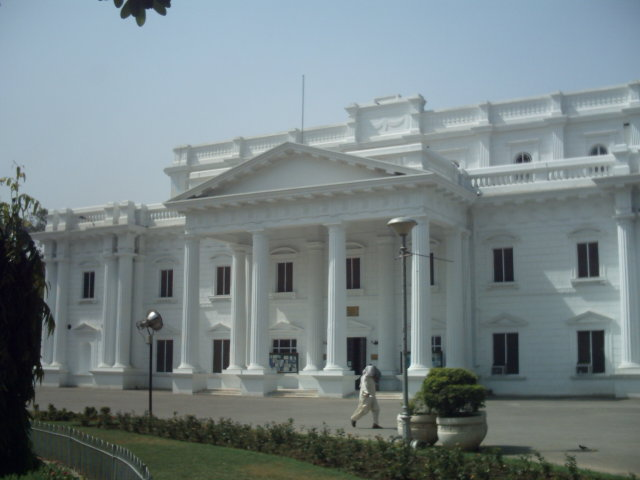
The Quaid-e-Azam Library in Bagh-e-Jinnah

- Atomic Energy Minerals Centre Library
- Model Town Library
- ITU-Library & Learning Resource Centre
- Babar Ali Library, Aitchison College
- Defence Public Library Complex
- Dr Baqir's Library
- Dyal Singh Trust Library
  The Dyal Singh Trust Library was established in Lahore in 1908 in pursuance of the will of the Sardar Dyal Singh Majithia. It was first set up in the Exchange Building, which was the residence of Sardar Dyal Singh.
- The Ewing Memorial Library
  The Ewing Memorial Library was built in 1943 and named for Dr. Sir J.C.R. Ewing, the second Principal of the college
- Islamia College Library, Islamia College
- Government College Library, Government College University
- Lahore University of Management Sciences Library, Lahore University of Management Sciences
- National Library of Engineering Sciences
  The national library of the university has a seating capacity of about 400 readers at its different floors.
- Pakistan Administrative Staff College Library
- People's Bank Library
- Provincial Assembly of the Punjab Library
- Punjab Public Library
- Quaid-e-Azam Library
  A highly detailed model of a newly constructed library was named as Quaid-e-Azam Library, after Muhammad Ali Jinnah. It is located at Bagh-e-Jinnah, which was once known as Lawrance Gardens.

== See also ==
- List of educational institutions in Lahore
- List of libraries in Pakistan
- List of universities in Lahore
- Origin of Lahore
- History of Lahore
