= Municipal Library Rawalpindi =

Public library in Pakistan

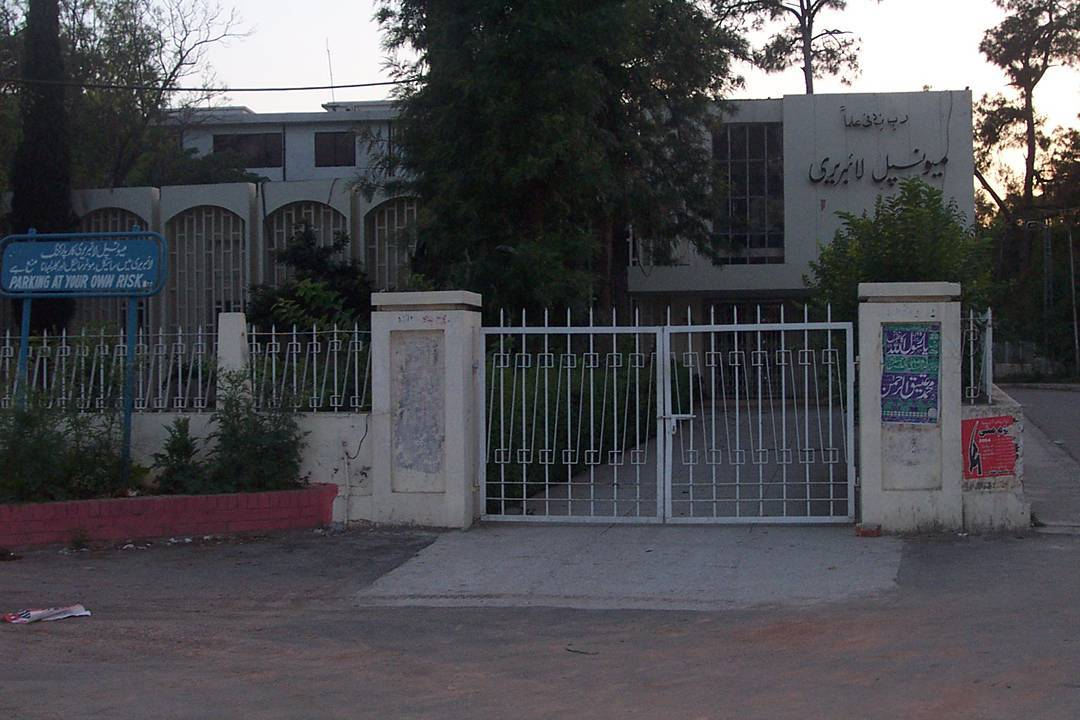
- Municipal Library Rawalpindi
- 33.6054°N 73.0651°E
- Location: Liaqat Bagh, Rawalpindi, Pakistan
- Type: Public
- Established: 1873

Collection
- Items collected: Books, magazines, journals, newspapers
- Size: 40,000

Access and use
- Population served: 2,098,231
- Members: 200

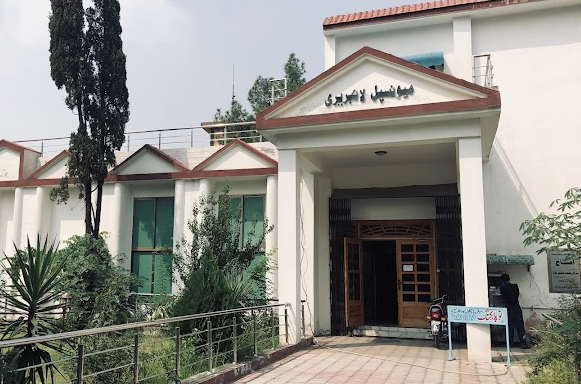
Another view of the library

Municipal Library Rawalpindi (Urdu: میونسپل لائبریری راولپنڈی) is a public library in Rawalpindi, Pakistan. Founded in 1873, it is located at Murree road, adjacent to Liaqat National Bagh. The library currently has a collection of around 40,000 books.

== History ==
When the Rawalpindi Municipal Corporation was established in 1868 during the British rule, a public library was also founded five years later to run under the corporation. Initially, it started inside the building of the Rawalpindi Press Club with only 1,000 books and 25 members. Later in 1968, the library was shifted to its current place at Murree road, Rawalpindi, in a new building. In 1982, the president Zia-ul-Haq sanctioned a big grant for the expansion and renovation of the library. As a result, the library once grew up having around 80,000 books and 7000 members. But it declined both in the number of books and active members during the following decades.

When in early 1980s, the president Zia-ul-Haq implemented Zakat system in the country, this library was also the first structure to be utilized for the purpose.

The library's structure received severe damage during the 2001 flooding in the city. Eventually, it had to be re-constructed in 2017–18 with the help of Rs. 23.6 million funding from the World Bank. It was re-opened for the public in January 2019.

In December 2021, the upper hall of the library caught fire sparked by short-circuit, turning hundreds of books and magazines into ashes.

== Services and facilities ==
The Municipal Library Rawalpindi provides over 40,000 books in various categories for the members. Around 2000 reference books, including dictionaries, encyclopedias and others, are also available. The general public can have access to all the notable national newspapers and magazines, both in English and Urdu languages.

The library has three large halls with lined-up tall bookcases.

== See also ==
- List of libraries in Pakistan
