= Quaid-e-Azam Library =

Library in Lahore, Pakistan

- کتب خانہ قائدِ اعظم
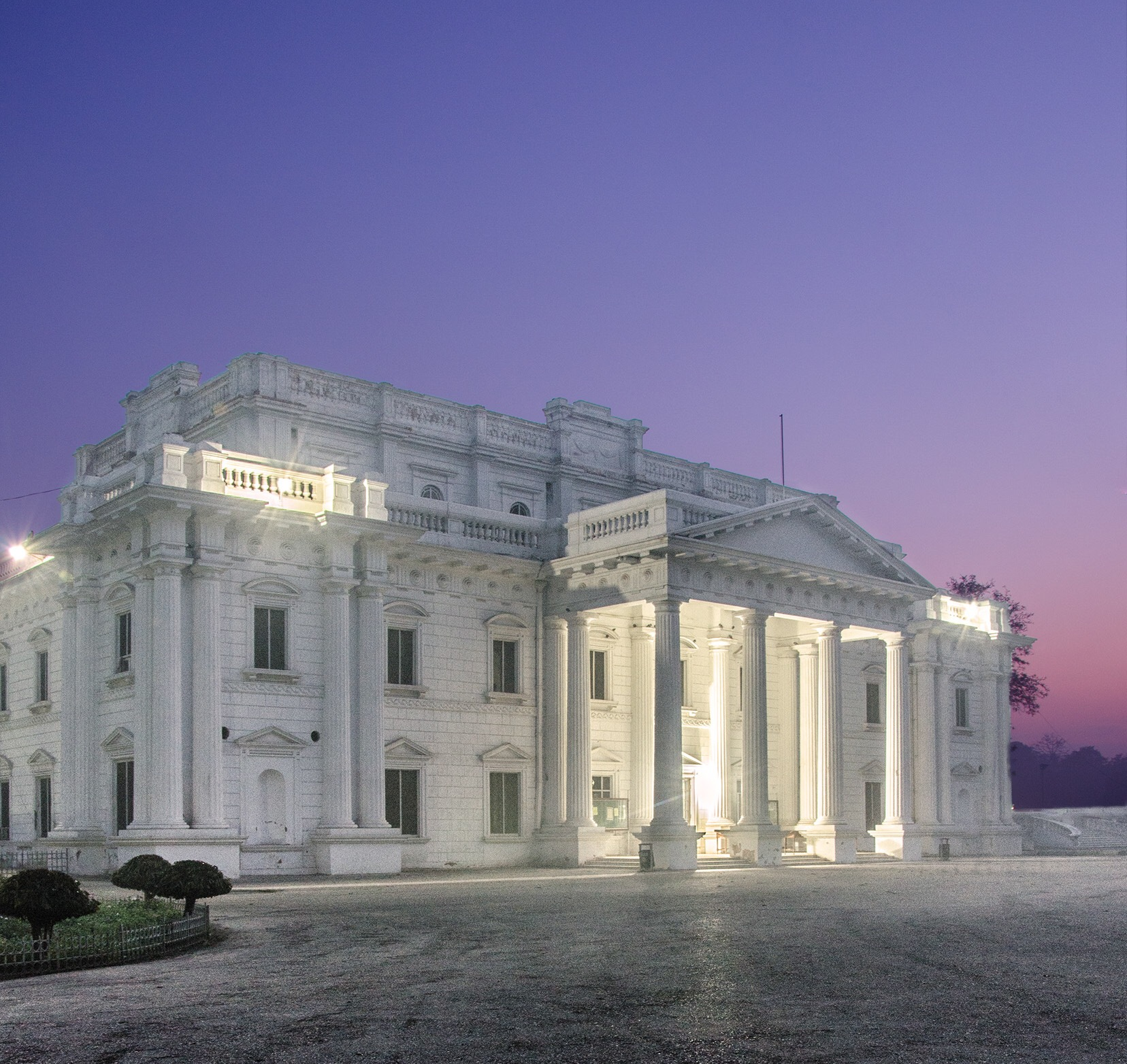
- Lawrence Hall (left) and Montgomery Hall (right), now the Quaid-e-Azam Library
- 31°33′46″N 74°20′30″E
- Location: Bagh-e-Jinnah, Lahore, Punjab, Pakistan
- Type: Public reference library
- Established: 25 December 1984 (library); Buildings completed 1866

Collection
- Size: 141,000 volumes (2022)
- Legal deposit: No

Access and use
- Access requirements: Open membership (ID required)
- Members: ≈ 17,000 (2022)

Other information
- Director: Board of Governors (Chair: Chief Minister, Punjab)
- Website: qal.punjab.gov.pk

The Quaid-e-Azam Library (Urdu: کتب خانہ قائدِ اعظم) is a public library in located within the Bagh-e-Jinnah in Lahore, Punjab, Pakistan. The library was constructed in the mid 19th century during the British Raj and consists of Victorian era Lawrence and Montgomery Halls. The library has a collection of 125,000 books in English, Urdu, Arabic and Persian.

== History ==
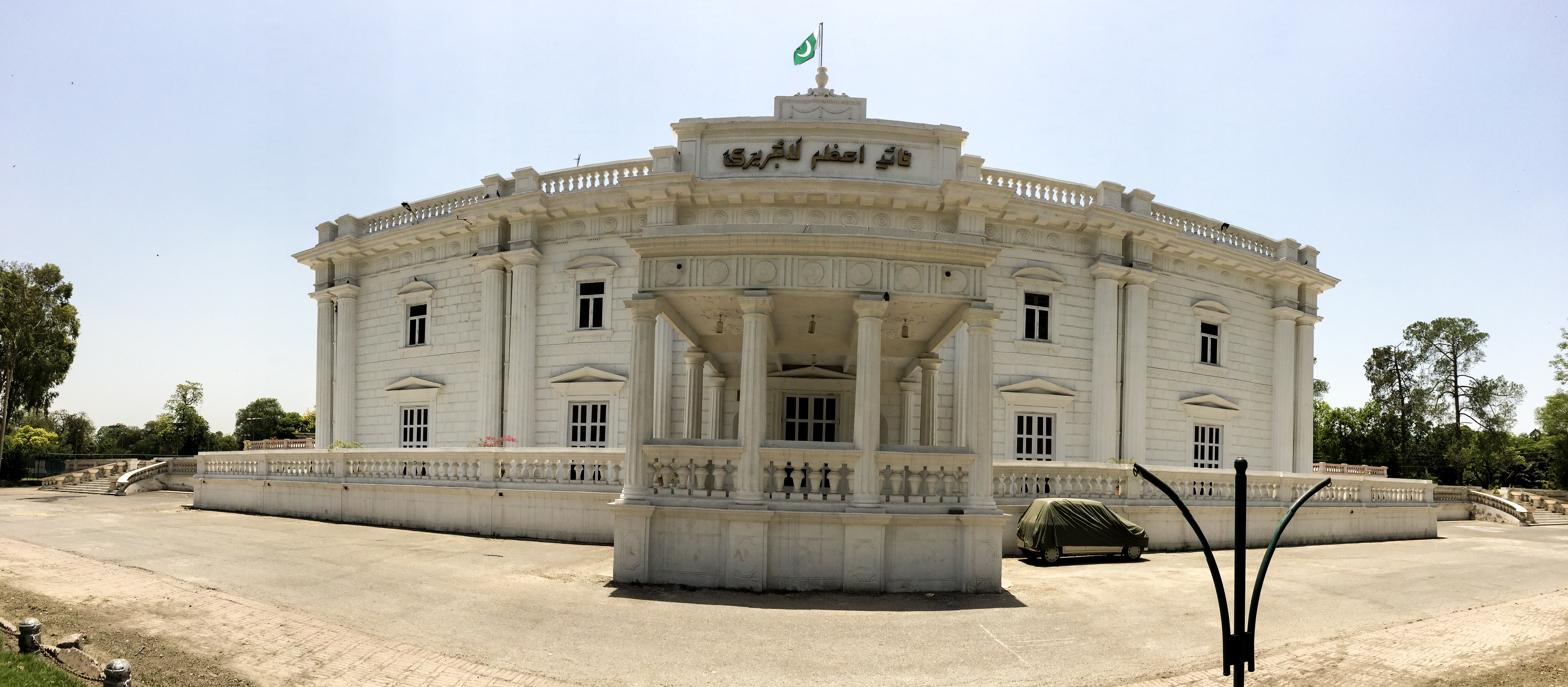

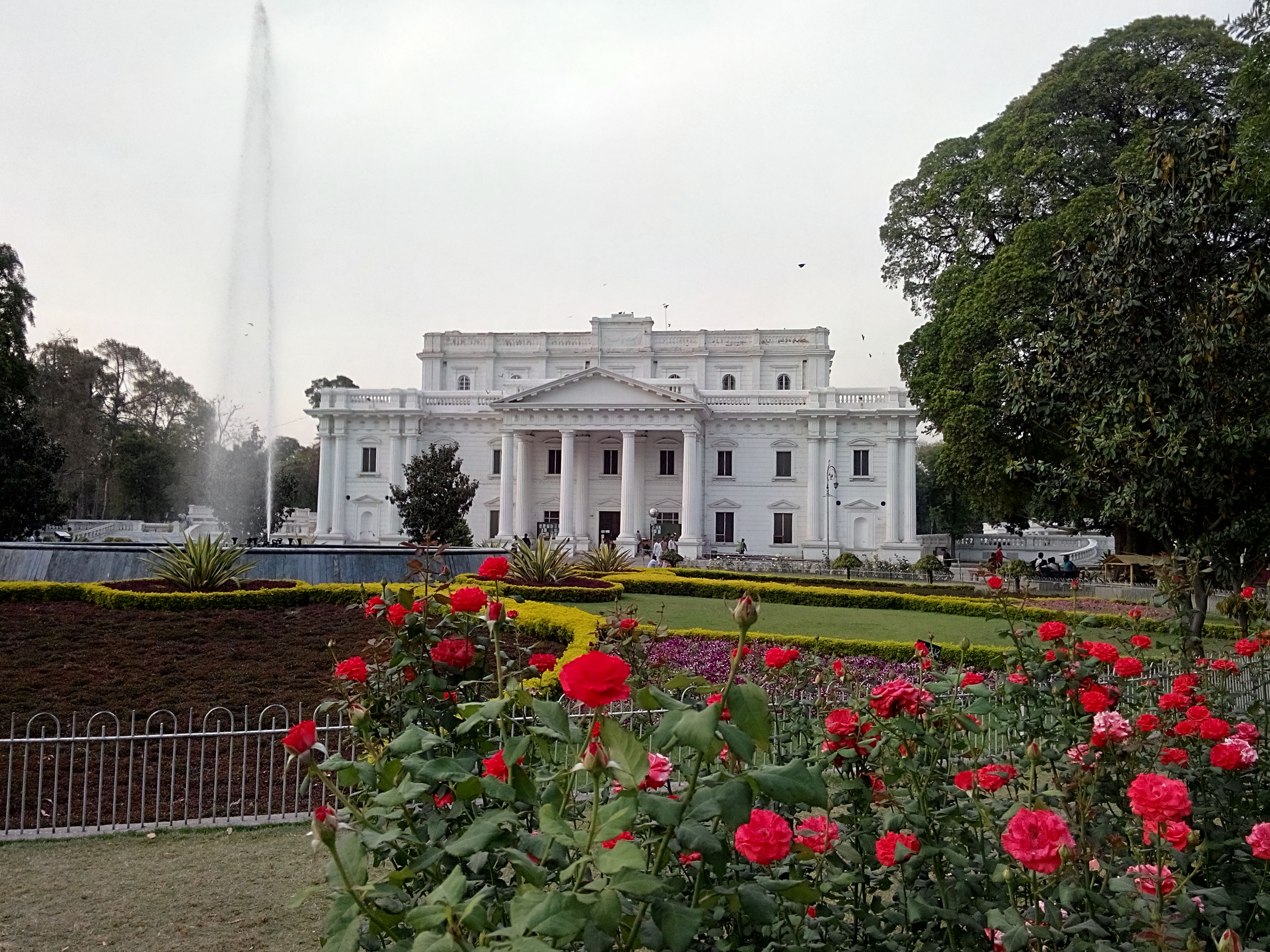

The complex includes two halls, the first was built in memory of John Laird Mair Lawrence, 1st Baron Lawrence, and the second in memory of Robert Montgomery Martin. It was built in 1866 at the initial cost of Rs.108,000, contributed by the Punjab Chiefs and leading Lahore citizens. The conformity of style with the earlier building was ensured by G. Stone who, in order to present a single unified whole, linked the space between the two halls by a covered corridor. a park previously known as "Lawrence Gardens".

The original curved roof of the Montgomery Hall was disassembled and substituted in 1875 with a teak floor for singing and dancing. The roof was coated, stimulated and corrugated with a decorative carved wooden cling stunningly painted in Egyptian and Italian patterns and fitted with glass windows. On May 1, 1878, the services of the halls, library and the reading room officially got the name of “Lahore and Mian Mir Institute.” The amenities, particularly the elitism of the place, turned it into a club where the people started getting registered as members. The name was changed to “Lahore Gymkhana Club” on January 23, 1906.

In January 1972, the Lahore Gymkhana Club was shifted to Upper Mall and the building became an academy for administrative training by the government of Pakistan only to on May 17, 1981, renovation of the building was started to turn it into a public library. On December 25, 1984, the then President General Muhammad Zia-ul-Haq officially inaugurated the Quaid-e-Azam Library.

In 2013, the government constructed two basements on the western and eastern sides of the library to add 20,000 sq. meters of reading space.

Today, The Quaid-e-Azam Library is an autonomous body functioning under a board of governors headed by CM.

== Architecture ==
The complex included two halls, namely the Montgomery Hall and Lawrence Hall. They are built in the neoclassical style.

The original features of the Old Gymkhana building were restored after extensive labor. Library now has a capacity for 1000 readers and storage space for more than 300,000 lac books, after the construction of two basements. The floor area of the building including basement is spanned over 70,000 sq. ft.

== Library ==
As of 2022, the library has 141,000 volumes, both in English and Urdu languages. Nearly three thousand books are added to the library annually. It has more than 17,000 people enrolled as the members of the library. The Lawrence Hall is normally used as an assembly room for public meetings, theatrical and musical amusements. Nearly 19,000 people visit the library annually. It is a non-lending library.

== Services at QAL ==
Computer Lab

A computer lab consisting of 50 latest computers offers internet, e-mail, educational downloads, HEC digital resources, and other information to the members of library. All services including usage of computer and internet are free of cost. The computer lab has been serving as a resource center for reference materials to scholars, researchers and graduate students of colleges and universities across the country.

CSS Study Room A separate room is reserved for the members who are willing to appear in Central Superior Services, Provincial Management Services or other competitive examinations. This room contains a special collection of books for preparation.

List of Newspapers

Quaid-e-Azam Library is spending a lot of money on maintaining a huge collection of newspapers for its members and readers. Approved List of Newspapers 2021 (Foreign + Local)

== See also ==
- List of libraries in Lahore
- List of libraries in Pakistan
