= Cantonment General Hospital, Rawalpindi =

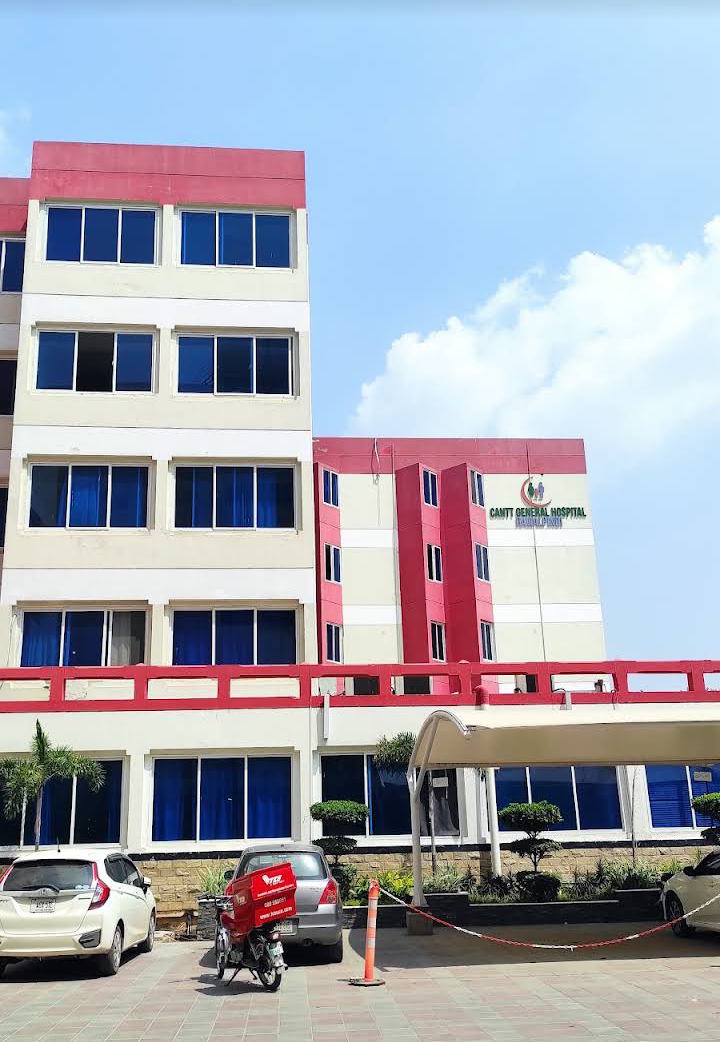

Geography
- Location: Rawalpindi, Pakistan
- Coordinates: 33°35′55″N 73°03′03″E

Organisation
- Care system: Public
- Affiliated university: Pakistan Army

History
- Construction started: 1901

Links
- Website: rcb.gov.pk/en/cantonment-general-hospital
- Lists: Hospitals in Pakistan

Cantonment General Hospital (Urdu: کنٹونمنٹ جنرل ہسپتال، راولپنڈی) is a Pakistan Army hospital in Rawalpindi Cantonment, Pakistan.

== History ==
In 1901, a small dispensary located on Hospital Road in the Rawalpindi Cantonment started operations. The dispensary, initially housed in the old barracks of British forces, was established to provide medical services to these residents, thus eliminating their need to travel into the city for healthcare. Over time, the dispensary developed into a hospital particularly recognized for its maternity services.

Following the 1947 partition, the dispensary was developed into a 20-bed hospital. Its expansion continued in 1989, with the construction of a new building on land donated by the former federal minister, Raja Shahid Zafar. This allowed the hospital to operate an 80-bed capacity during a single shift.

In 2018, the federal government designated Rs560 million for the hospital's renovation. After the completion of renovation project, the hospital's capacity to 500 beds.
