= Balochistan University of Information Technology, Engineering & Management Sciences =

University in Pakistan

Coordinates: 30.26886°N 66.94413°E

Balochistan University of Information Technology, Engineering and Management Sciences (BUITEMS)
- د بلوچستان د معلوماتي ټکنالوژۍ، انجینرۍ او مدیریت علومو پوهنتون (BUITEMS) دانشگاه انفارمیشن ٹیکنالوجی، انجینئرنگ ءُ مینجمنٹ بلوچستان (BUITEMS) دانشگاه فناوری اطلاعات، مهندسی و علوم مدیریتی بلوچستان (BUITEMS)
- Other name: BUITEMS
- Motto: Quality and Excellence in Education
- Type: Public
- Established: 2002
- Accreditation: Higher Education Commission of Pakistan, Pakistan Engineering Council
- Academic affiliations: Association of Commonwealth Universities, World Confederation of Businesses, American Society for Quality, United Nations Academic Impact, International Association of Universities
- Endowment: Rs. 30 million
- Chancellor: Governor of Balochistan
- Vice-Chancellor: Dr. Khalid Hafeez (T.I.)
- Academic staff: 572
- Students: 9197
- Location: Quetta, Balochistan, Pakistan
- Campus: Takatu Campus (104 acres [42 ha]), Jinnah Campus (20 acres [8.1 ha]), Chiltan Campus, Zhob Campus
- Colours: Blue and gold
- Website: www.buitms.edu.pk

The Balochistan University of Information Technology, Engineering, and Management Sciences (BUITEMS) is a public research university in Quetta, Balochistan, Pakistan. The Government of Balochistan chartered the university in 2002. The university officially commenced its academic activities in 2002 with three undergraduate programs in computer science, computer engineering and business administration with an initial enrollment of 90 students. The university is structured around four campuses that focus on engineering, information technology business, arts, and life sciences consisting of 30 academic programs at undergraduate and graduate levels. As of spring 2017, the university has grown to a student strength of 9,197, and a faculty of 600.

== Campuses ==
BUITEMS has four campuses: the City Campus which houses the Faculty of Management Sciences; the Takatu Campus, accommodating the Faculty of Information and Communication Technology, the Faculty of Life Sciences and Informatics, the Faculty of Arts and Basic Sciences and the Faculty of Engineering; the Chiltan Campus which is being developed as research forum and laboratories of the Faculty of Life Sciences and Informatics. and the Zhob Campus which accommodates BS programs in economics, business administration, and computer science.

=== Central Campus ===
The Takatu Campus is the academic central campus and is on 44 ha (108 acres), it is the largest among the four campuses and is second largest in the province area wise. The campus is situated on Quetta Chaman Road in the northwest of the city. Along with four faculties, the campus houses the central administration of the university as well as provide student dormitories, bachelor lodges, and homes to staff with families.

=== Non-central campuses ===
The university operates on three sub-campuses namely City campus, Chiltan campus, and Zhob campus. City campus is the founder building of BUITEMS allocated by the provincial cabinet of Balochistan. The building was formerly Primary Education Directorate. The Chiltan campus is spread over a 61 ha (150 acres) and is situated at Regional Cooperation for Development Highway, Quetta. The campus is reserved for research studies on Bioinformatics, agricultural technologies, medical diagnostics and environment management. It has tube wells, greenhouses, tissue culture laboratories and research farms facilities for the students. University College of Zhob BUITEMS is a recently developed campus it is situated in District Zhob, Balochistan. The campus offers undergraduate programs in Economics, Business Administration, and Computer Science and is functional since spring 2018.

== Academics ==
BUITEMS follows a quarter system with spring quarter commencing in early March and fall quarter starting in mid-August. The university follows a full-time, four-year undergraduate program except for Bachelors of Architecture which is a five-year long program. The undergraduate programs are eight semesters long with each semester spread over eighteen weeks. Undergrad students are required to take 15-18 credit hours every semester and 6 credit hours at end of the program for a final year project. The graduate programs are two years long with a minimum duration of 1.5 years. Grad students enroll for the courses that make up to a maximum of 12 credit hours in a single semester. They have to complete 24 credit hours course work and six credit hours research thesis for the completion of their degree. As of 2017 BUITEMS has a 14:1 student-teacher ratio.

== University authorities and administration ==
=== The Senate ===
The BUITEMS Senate is the authoritative body, with 17 members. It is responsible for the governance of the university and reflects university-wide policies. The Chancellor of the university chairs the Senate and has the supervision powers over the university. The Vice-Chancellor and other university authorities are held accountable for all functions of the university.

=== BUITEMS syndicate ===
The syndicate is the top executive body of the university. The body has 15 members and is primarily responsible for raising education levels including teaching, research, and publications. They supervise university property and general affairs related to students and staff.

=== Selection board ===
BUITEMS has a fully authorized employee and staff selection board. It is a 12-member body composed of Vice-chancellors of the major provincial institutes as well as heads of the five faculties. The board is headed by Vice Chancellor and is solely responsible for hiring new academic and administrative staff members.

== Faculties ==
=== Faculty of Basic Sciences ===
- Mathematics
- Physics
- Chemistry

=== Faculty of Engineering and Architecture ===
- Chemical Engineering
- Textile Engineering
- Petroleum & Gas Engineering
- Mining Engineering
- Geological Engineering
- Civil Engineering
- Mechanical Engineering
- Architecture

=== Faculty of Information & Communication Technology ===
- Electrical Engineering
- Telecom Engineering
- Computer Engineering
- Electronics Engineering
- Computer Science
- Information Technology
- Software Engineering

=== Faculty of Management Sciences ===
- Management Sciences
- Economics
- Public Administration
- Bachelor of Law
- Education

=== Faculty of Life Sciences and Informatics ===
- Biotechnology and informatics
- Microbiology
- Environmental Sciences
- Environmental Management and Policy

== Basics ==
=== Libraries ===
BUITEMS has one central library with 40,000+ books. The individual campuses house a number of small departmental libraries. The libraries also provide students with free access to a world of books through digital library access. The books in the central library are managed through a fully automated library management system that assists in finding a book anywhere from the campus.

=== Art galleries ===
The main campus has a number of art galleries showcasing the collection of modern art ranging from artifacts, paintings, and sculptures made by the students of Faculty of Arts and Basic Sciences. Ir-relative of the course, students of other faculties also spend time and receive their share learning and knowing arts at the galleries.

=== Research center and senior design labs ===
The university provides resources and facilities for carrying out graduate research and undergraduate final year projects. The central research center was inaugurated in 2015 and is dedicated for graduate students to work at their designated research desks each equipped with computing and other related resources. For undergrad students, the campus holds senior design labs, workshop labs, and experimental laboratories where students are provided to work on their undergraduate projects.

== Research and reputation ==
The institute's research activities are governed by the Office of Research, Innovation, and Commercialization (ORIC) led by Dr. Anayatullah Baloch. It is responsible for promoting and enhancing quality research activities and publications. The office assists in Board of studies and conducts Advanced Studies and Research Board (ASRB) meetings to review research projects and coordinate with the academic departments for holding research activities. Research funding are sponsored by different national and international sponsoring agencies including Higher Education Commission, ALP (Agricultural Linkage Program), Ministry of Science & Technology, Pakistan Science Foundation (PSF), International Science Foundation, World Health Organization (WHO), FAO / International Atomic Energy Agency (IAEA), International Fund for Agricultural Development (IFAD), and NIH USA. The Research Grants Program provides support for research projects in the following fields of Biotechnology and Informatics, Basic and Applied Sciences, Engineering, Information Technology, Administrative Sciences, and Arts. Projects funded by ORIC mainly focus national interest and funds both academic and industrial projects. In the 2012-2017 session, the university spent 10501691.63 RS in research.
