= Odeon Cinema, Rawalpindi =

Theatre in Rawalpindi, Pakistan

Odeon Cinema
- Interactive map of the Odeon Cinema area

General information
- Location: Mall Road, Rawalpindi, Pakistan
- Coordinates: 33°35′45″N 73°02′47″E
- Opened: 1891

Odeon Cinema is a historic cinema located in Rawalpindi Cantonment, Punjab, Pakistan.

== History ==
In 1891, the Lansdowne Trust Rawalpindi was established by Rai Bahadur Sardar Kirpal Singh and Rai Bahadur Sardar Sujan Singh, with an administrative committee including the general officer commanding, the Rawalpindi commissioner, the deputy commissioner, and trust members. The theatre was constructed in 1897 and initially showcased silent films.

The original building of the trust was converted into a cinema house by the trustee in 1912. The cinema was damaged by fire in 1946 and remained unrestored until 1949. After a fire caused by a short circuit, the cantonment management took control of the cinema, constructed a central gate, and expanded into adjacent offices.

In the 1960s, the restored building was named Odeon Cinema by the then tenant.

In 2008, the cinema was closed to the public by order of Station Commander Brigadier Sajjad Azam due to the leaseholder's failure to pay the annual rent.

Odeon Cinema historically screened English, Urdu, and Punjabi films.
