= Dyal Singh Trust Library =

- کتب خانہ دیال سنگھ ٹرسٹ
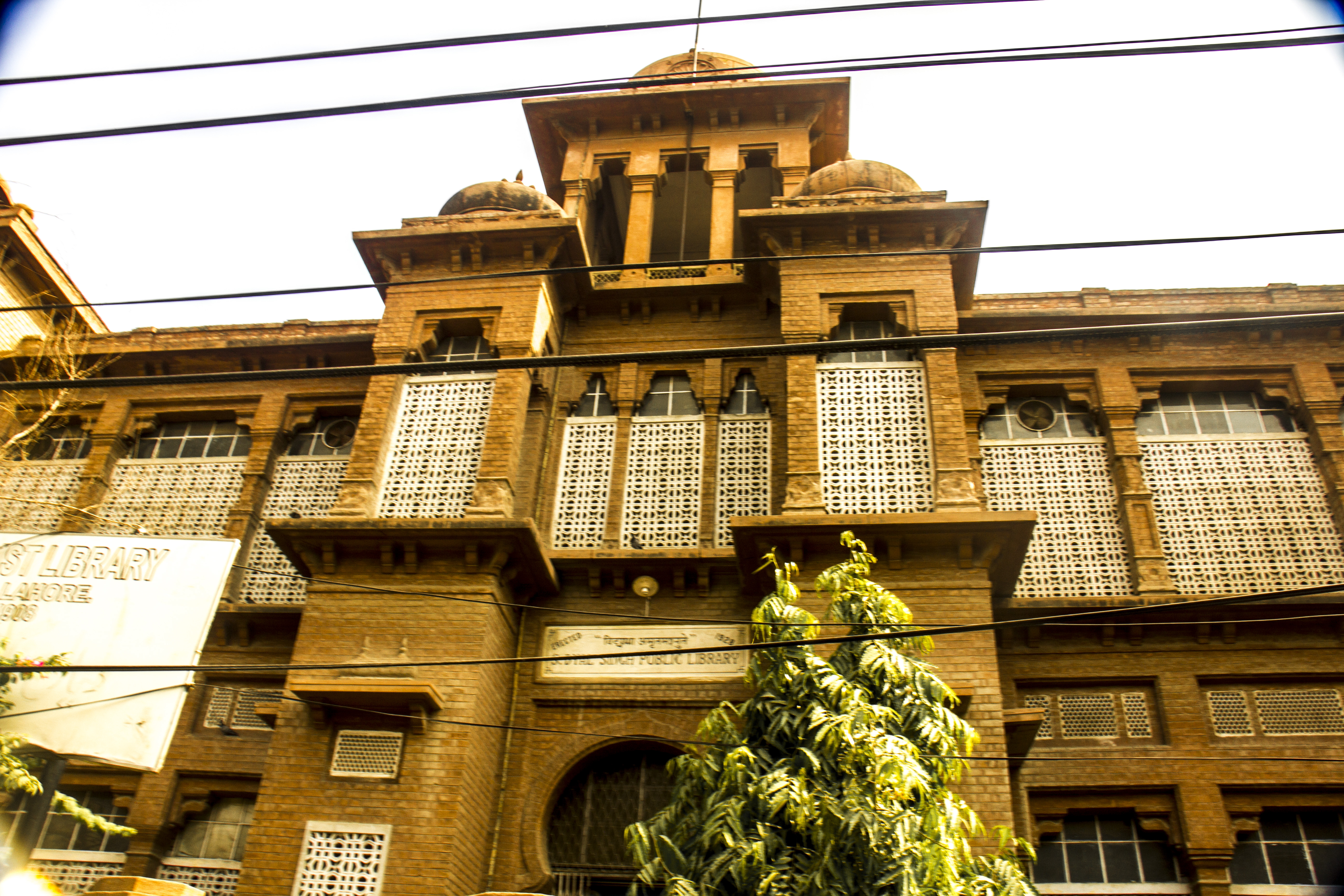
- 31.56977761945715°N 74.32221261660517°E
- Location: Lahore, Punjab, Pakistan, Pakistan
- Established: 1908

The Dyal Singh Trust Library is a public library located in Lahore, Pakistan.

== History ==
It was established by Sardar Dyal Singh Majithia in Lahore in 1908. The library was initially established in the residence of Sardar Dyal Singh Majithia, and upon completion of the existing building it was shifted there.

An initial amount of RS 60,000 was granted for the books and financial requirements of the library.

== See also ==
- List of libraries in Lahore
