= World Confederation of Businesses =

International organization for businesses

- Company type: Private company
- Industry: Business Organization
- Founded: 2004; 22 years ago
- Founder: Jesus Moran
- Headquarters: Houston, United States
- Services: Bizz awards, CSR certification, Bizznews, WORLDCOB Trust Seal, Bizzevents
- Website: www.worldcob.org

The World Confederation of Businesses (WORLDCOB) is an American business organization founded in 2005 that awards the annual Bizz Awards and other certifications. The ceremony is hosted annually in three different cities, one for Europe, one for Americas, and the one for the joined region of Asia, Middle East and Africa.

== History ==
The company was founded on September 9, 2004, in Houston, Texas by Jesus Moran under the name of "MPBM. Co". Authorization was requested for the use of the name World Confederation of Businesses as the Trade name of "MPBM. Co".

WORLDCOB has a governing body consisting of the chairman, vice chairman, and the board of directors, made up of a multidisciplinary team with experience in the field of business consultancy and advisory. The main offices were set up in Houston, Texas and Lima, Peru.

In 2005 the company launched the Bizz Awards programme. WORLDCOB is a participant of the United Nations Global Compact since 2008.

In 2019, the organization announced the launching of Worldcob Trust Seal (WTS), a service that verifies the legal and operational status of a business.

In 2024, the World Confederation of Businesses (WORLDCOB) celebrated its 20th anniversary as a global business organization. The main celebration was held in Singapore.

In 2025, the 20th anniversary of THE BIZZ Awards was marked with a special edition held in Cusco, Peru, from August 24 to 27. The event brought together award recipients, international participants, and members of WORLDCOB.

== The BIZZ Awards Ceremonies ==
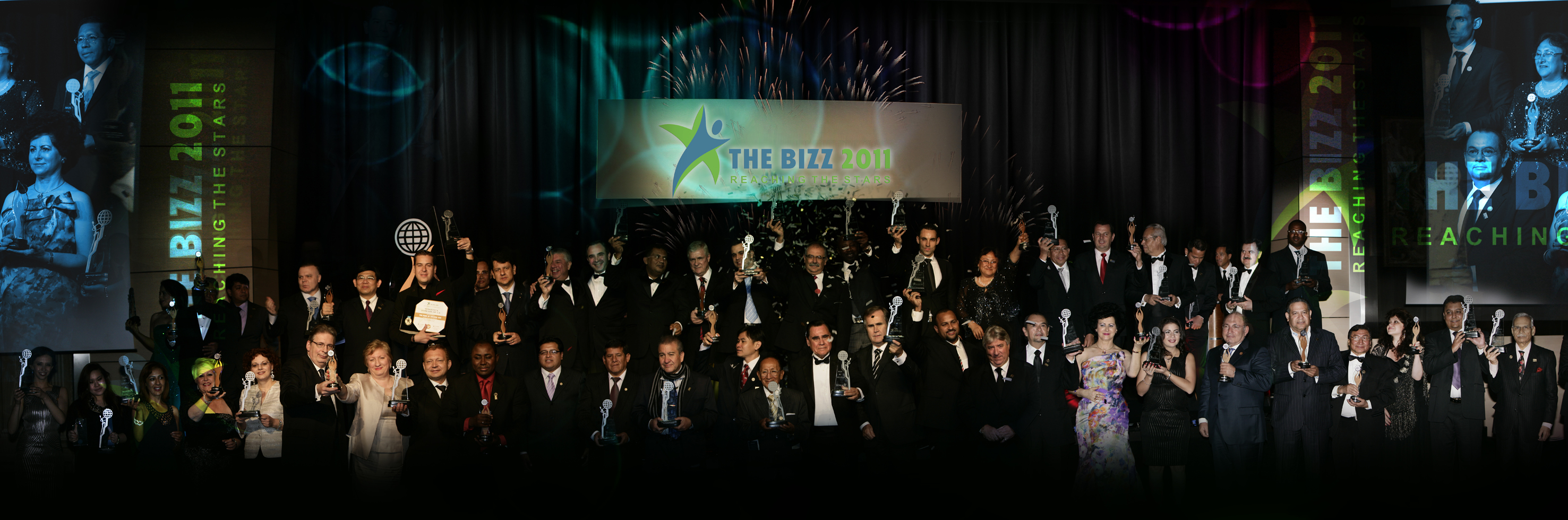
Award winners at the 2011 Bizz Awards

Since 2005, THE BIZZ Awards by WORLDCOB have recognized business excellence in companies across over 130 countries. The award is typically hosted three times a year in different global regions—Europe, the Americas, and Asia/Middle East/Africa—with an additional flagship event known as THE BIZZ Signature.

The Bizz Awards ceremony was hosted in Houston (2005), New York City (2006), Punta Cana (2007), Panama City (2008), Cuzco, Peru (2009), Houston again (2010), Rome (2011), Bahamas (2012), Los Cabos, Dubai and Paris (2013), Abu Dhabi, Hawaii, Venice (2014), Muscat, Las Vegas, Athens (2015), Marrakesh, Washington D.C. and Monte Carlo (2016), Dubai, St. Thomas and Bucharest (2017), Hong Kong, Miami Beach and Prague (2018), Madrid, Johannesburg and San Francisco (2019), virtual (COVID-19 pandemic) (2020), Istanbul, Toronto, Cape Town (2021), Amsterdam, Seoul, Santiago (2022), Lisbon, Houston, Singapore (2023), Dubai, Atlanta, Singapore (2024), Cusco, Peru (20th Anniversary of THE BIZZ Awards) (2025).

== Award ==
- Martin Rowinski & Boardsi (USA) – Recognized at THE BIZZ 2022 in Las Vegas for visionary entrepreneurship.
- Dubai Taxi Corporation (UAE) – Honored for Innovative Service Delivery in 2023.
- Certis Lanka Security Solutions (Sri Lanka) – Received the “Peak of Success” award in 2023.
- FITC Nigeria & Chizor Malize – Honored with the Business Excellence Award and African Woman of the Year Leadership Award in 2024.
- Adzi Trims (Bangladesh) – Awarded the BIZZ Entrepreneurial Award at the 2023 event in Astana, Kazakhstan.
- Vega Real (Dominican Republic) – Received the "Be a Legend" recognition in 2023.
- Comfenalco Quindío (Colombia) – Awarded the BIZZ Award in the *Inspirational* category during the 20th anniversary celebration in Cusco on August 27, 2025.
- Fábrica de Licores del Tolima (Colombia) – Recognized for business excellence in 2025 at the Atlanta edition of THE BIZZ.
- Coopnama (Dominican Republic) – Received the BIZZ Award in the United States in 2023.
- Qatar Credit Bureau (Qatar) – Recognized in 2021 for achievements in financial services.
- JTA Holding (Qatar) – Named “Inspirational Company of the Year” in 2021.
- Astana Awards 2023 (Kazakhstan) – Hosted over 100 companies from more than 40 countries.

== Brands and services ==
The World Confederation of Businesses (WORLDCOB) operates a portfolio of global brands and services to promote business excellence, corporate responsibility, networking, and organizational credibility.

=== THE BIZZ Awards ===
WORLDCOB organizes THE BIZZ Awards, an international business recognition program that highlights companies for their performance in areas such as leadership, management systems, innovation, creativity, and corporate social responsibility. Since 2005, the awards have taken place in more than 35 cities across five continents.

=== WORLDCOB-CSR 2011.3 Certification ===
Since 2011 the organization has also been the certifying body for the Worldcob certification in corporate social responsibility (WORLDCOB-CSR). The certification lasts for a single year, and is determined after an audit of corporate documents by the organization. The organization states that it has over 3000 members in over 130 countries. It launched a business-to-business online platform in 2009, where members contact each other and conduct various business transactions. The congress also holds the CSR Workshop Tour.

The organization has developed WORLDCOB-CSR.2011.03 Standard Certification, an International Standard which is validated by the British Standard Institute.

=== BIZZEVENTS ===
WORLDCOB operates BIZZEVENTS, a division focused on organizing virtual, hybrid, and in-person business events such as forums, conferences, product launches, and expos for member companies.

=== BIZZNEWS ===
BIZZNEWS is WORLDCOB’s digital publication, featuring news, articles, interviews, and updates on business topics, corporate social responsibility practices, and profiles of award recipients.

=== WORLDCOB Trust Seal (WTS) ===
The WORLDCOB Trust Seal is a certification program that confirms a company’s legal existence and business credibility in its country of registration. It is intended to support trust-building with international partners, clients, and investors by verifying compliance with local regulations.
