= Rawalpindi Cantonment =

- Urban
- Location within Punjab, Pakistan Location within Pakistan
- Coordinates: 33°35′45″N 73°02′46″E
- Country: Pakistan
- Province: Punjab
- District: Rawalpindi District

Government
  - President RCB: Brig. Ijaz Qamar Kiani

Area
  - Total: 41.16 km^{2} (15.89 sq mi)
- Elevation: 487 m (1,598 ft)

Population (2023)
  - Total: 740,483
  - Density: 17,990.4/km^{2} (46,595/sq mi)
- Time zone: UTC+5 (PST)
- Postal code: 46000
- Calling code: 051
- Website: rcb.gov.pk

Rawalpindi Cantonment (Urdu: چھاؤنی راولپنڈی) is a large military town located in Rawalpindi, Punjab province, Pakistan. The headquarters of the Pakistan Army, which are known as the General Headquarters (GHQ), are located in the nearby Chaklala Cantonment. It covers an area of 41.16 km^{2} (15.89 sq mi). The population of the town is 740,483 according to the 2023 census.

Rawalpindi Cantonment is one of the three components of Rawalpindi Tehsil (sub-district) together with Rawalpindi Metropolitan Corporation and Chaklala Cantonment. The tehsil is part of the wider Islamabad–Rawalpindi metropolitan area, which has a population of more than 6 million people. It is situated on the Grand Trunk Road and on Railway Line 1, the main railway line of the country. The town has its own railway station, Rawalpindi railway station, and its own hospital, Cantonment General Hospital.

== History ==
In 1901 the cantonment, with its population of 40,611, was the most important in India. It contained an arsenal, one battery of horse and one of field artillery, one mountain battery, one company of garrison artillery, and one ammunition column of field artillery; one regiment of British and one of local cavalry; two of British and two of local infantry; and two companies of sappers and miners, with a balloon section. It was the winter headquarters of the Northern Command, and of the Rawalpindi military division. The cantonment also contained an English and several Anglo-vernacular middle schools, and an English convent school for girls.

== Layout today ==
Initially, Rawalpindi Cantonment was the only one in Rawalpindi city and the largest in Pakistan. However, this was one of the most poorly managed cantonments and it was facing administrative challenges due to its size, area and population. Therefore, during General Pervez Musharraf's era, Rawalpindi Cantonment was split into Rawalpindi Cantonment and Chaklala Cantonment. The northern and eastern parts of the city around the airport were included in Chaklala Cantonment, while the western and southern parts of Rawalpindi Cantonment remained as is.

Following the partition, a number of streets and neighborhoods in Rawalpindi Cantonment underwent a renaming process. Mayo Road was renamed Rashid Minhas Road, Wynne Thomas Road became Sarwar Road, and Craig Road was changed to Sir Syed Road. Macdonald Road was renamed Tufail Road, while Napier Road became Iftikhar Janjua Road.

Also, Clyde Road was changed to Aziz Bhatti Road, Church Road to Tamiz-ud-Din Road, and Victoria Road to Sharif Road. Cunningham Road was renamed Kashmir Road, Lawrence Road became Haider Road, and Edward Road was changed to Bank Road. Lastly, Nicholson Road was renamed Taimoor Road.

== See also ==
- Odeon Cinema, Rawalpindi
