= Bagh-e-Jinnah, Lahore =

Historical park in the city of Lahore, Pakistan

Bagh-e-Jinnah باغِ جناح
- باغِ جناح
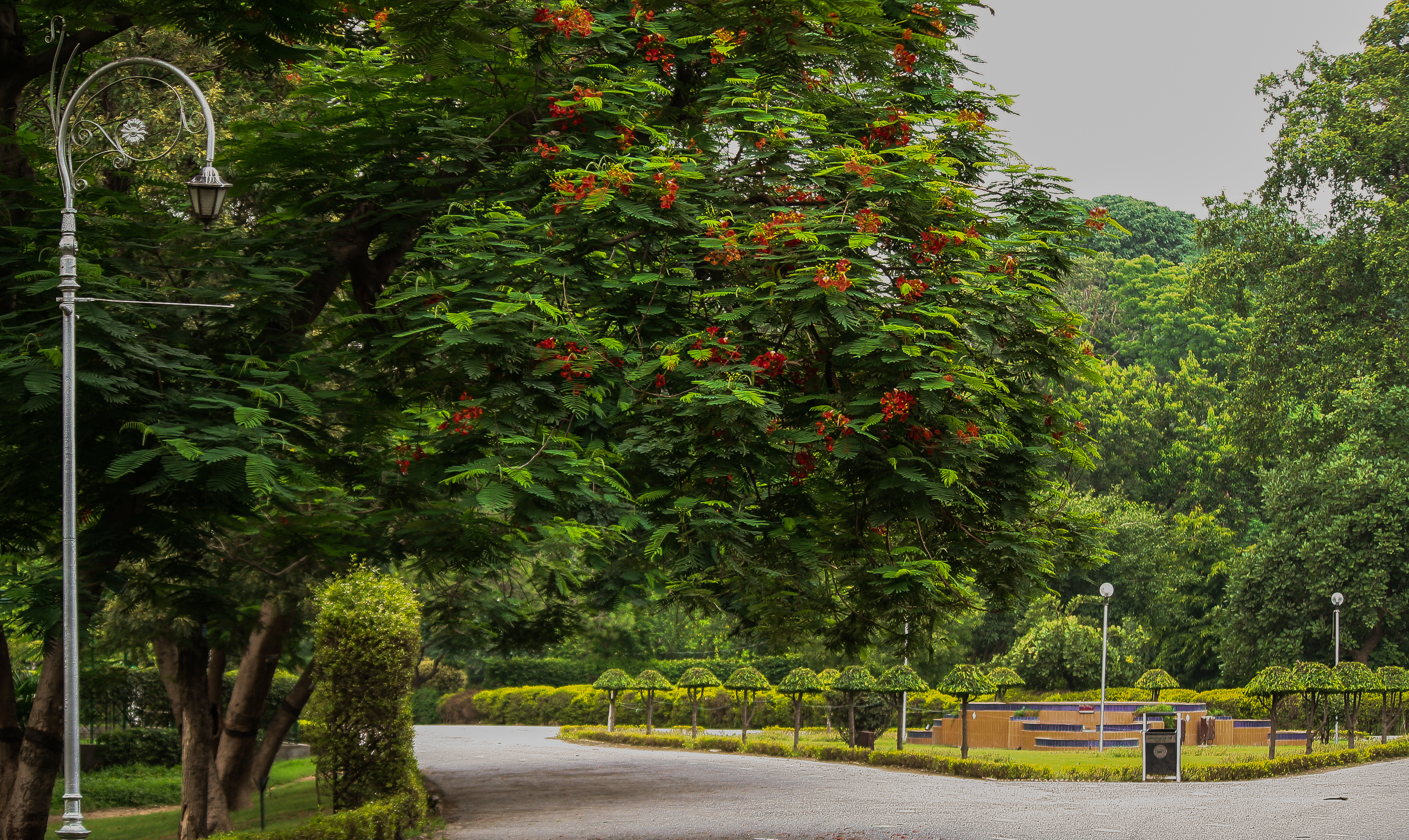
- Interactive map of Bagh-e-Jinnah باغِ جناح
- Location: The Mall, Lahore, Punjab, Pakistan
- Coordinates: 31.5537°N 74.3313°E
- Area: 0.57 km2
- Established: 1860
- Etymology: The Garden of Jinnah is named after Quaid-e-Azam Muhammad Ali Jinnah, founder of Pakistan. Earlier, it was named after John Lawrence, Viceroy of India.
- Administrator: Parks and Horticulture Authority

Bagh-e-Jinnah (Urdu: باغِ جناح, lit. 'Jinnah Garden'), formerly known as Lawrence Gardens, is a historical park in the city of Lahore, Pakistan. The large green space contains a botanical garden, Masjid Dar-ul-Islam, and Quaid-e-Azam Library.

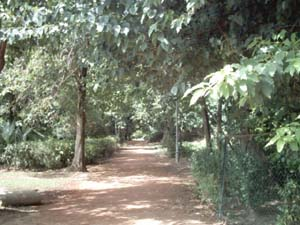
Walking trail in Bagh-e-Jinnah

There are also entertainment and sports facilities within the park: an open-air theater, a restaurant, tennis courts and the Gymkhana Cricket Ground. It is located on Lawrence Road next to Lahore Zoo, directly across from the Governor's House on The Mall.

== History ==
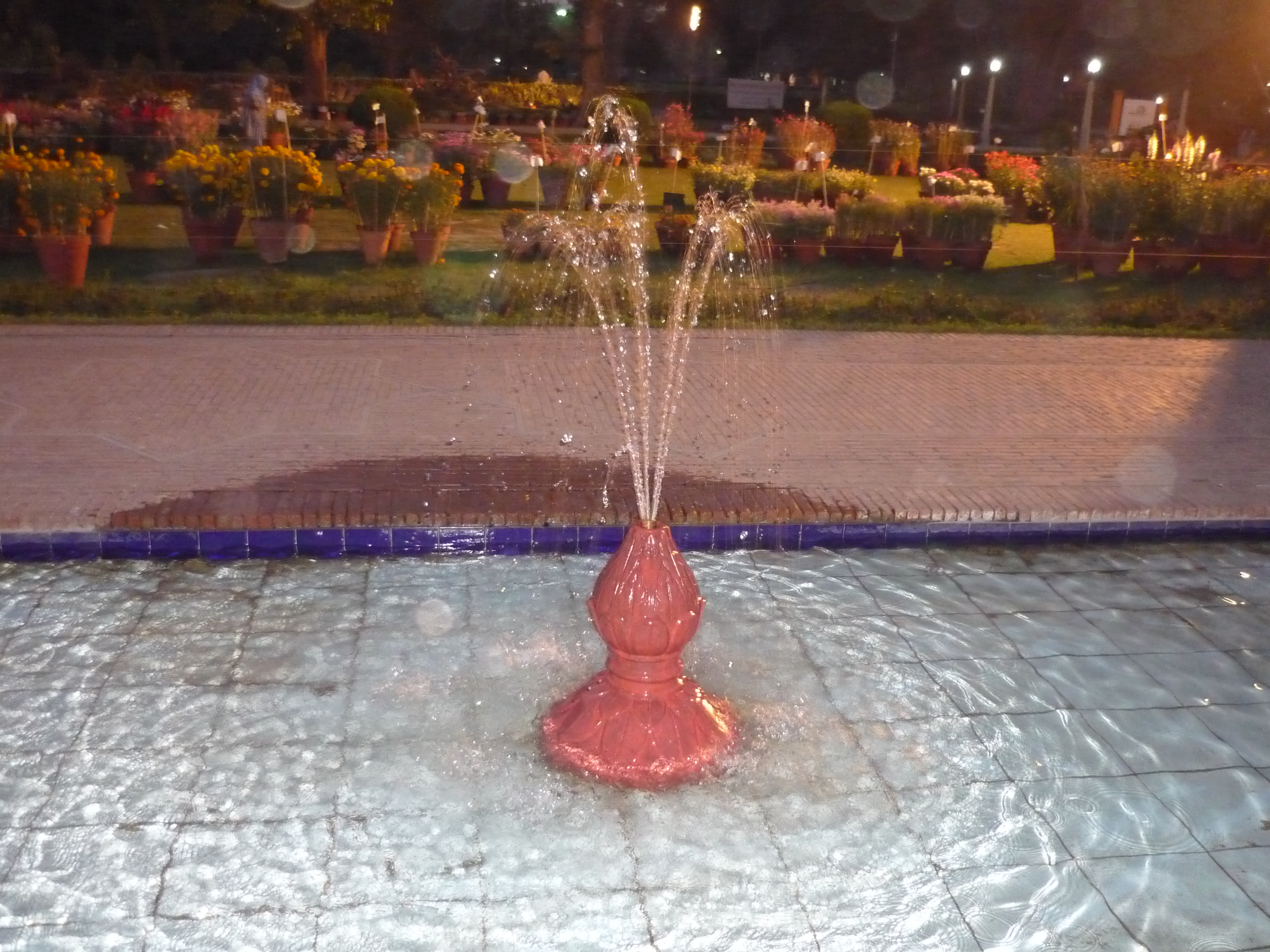
A fountain in the Bagh-e-Jinnah park

The site was originally occupied by the Agri-Horticultural Society of the Punjab and had been planned as a botanical garden modelled on Kew Gardens in London. The garden was named after John Lawrence, 1st Baron Lawrence, who served as the first Chief Commissioner and then Lieutenant Governor of the Punjab, and who later became Viceroy of India from 1864 to 1869.

By 1860, when the first part of Lawrence Gardens had been laid out, the site had become a wilderness, partly used as a menagerie and the rest as a pleasure ground for badminton, archery and cricket. The first tree planted in the garden was in January 1862 and that same year Lawrence Hall was constructed for holding public meetings and theatrical entertainment. In 1866 Montgomery Hall was also completed and in 1868 the site enlarged through the purchase of land to the south of the gardens. By 1876 the garden contained 80,000 trees and shrubs of 600 different species including trees from the plains of India, Austria, Syria, and southern Europe.

At the beginning of the twentieth century, Lawrence Garden began selling plants it had grown to the general public. Fruit trees were imported from across the British Empire, including grapes and mulberries from Kabul, peaches from Agra, and plantains from Calcutta. In 1904 the Department of Agriculture became responsible for maintenance of the garden and since 1912 approximately seven acres have been managed by Government College University, Lahore.

Following Partition and the creation of Pakistan, Lawrence Gardens was renamed Bagh-e-Jinnah in honour of Muhammad Ali Jinnah. A statue of Lawrence, standing outside the nearby Lahore High Court, was removed in August 1951 and later moved to Foyle and Londonderry College in Northern Ireland. Lawrence and Montgomery Halls were repurposed for the Quaid-e-Azam Library in 1984.

== Geography ==
The gardens are currently situated within 0.57 square kilometres (141 acres). The site was originally larger, consisting of 0.71 square kilometres (176 acres), however part of the land was given to Lahore Zoo, and for local development.

== Botany ==
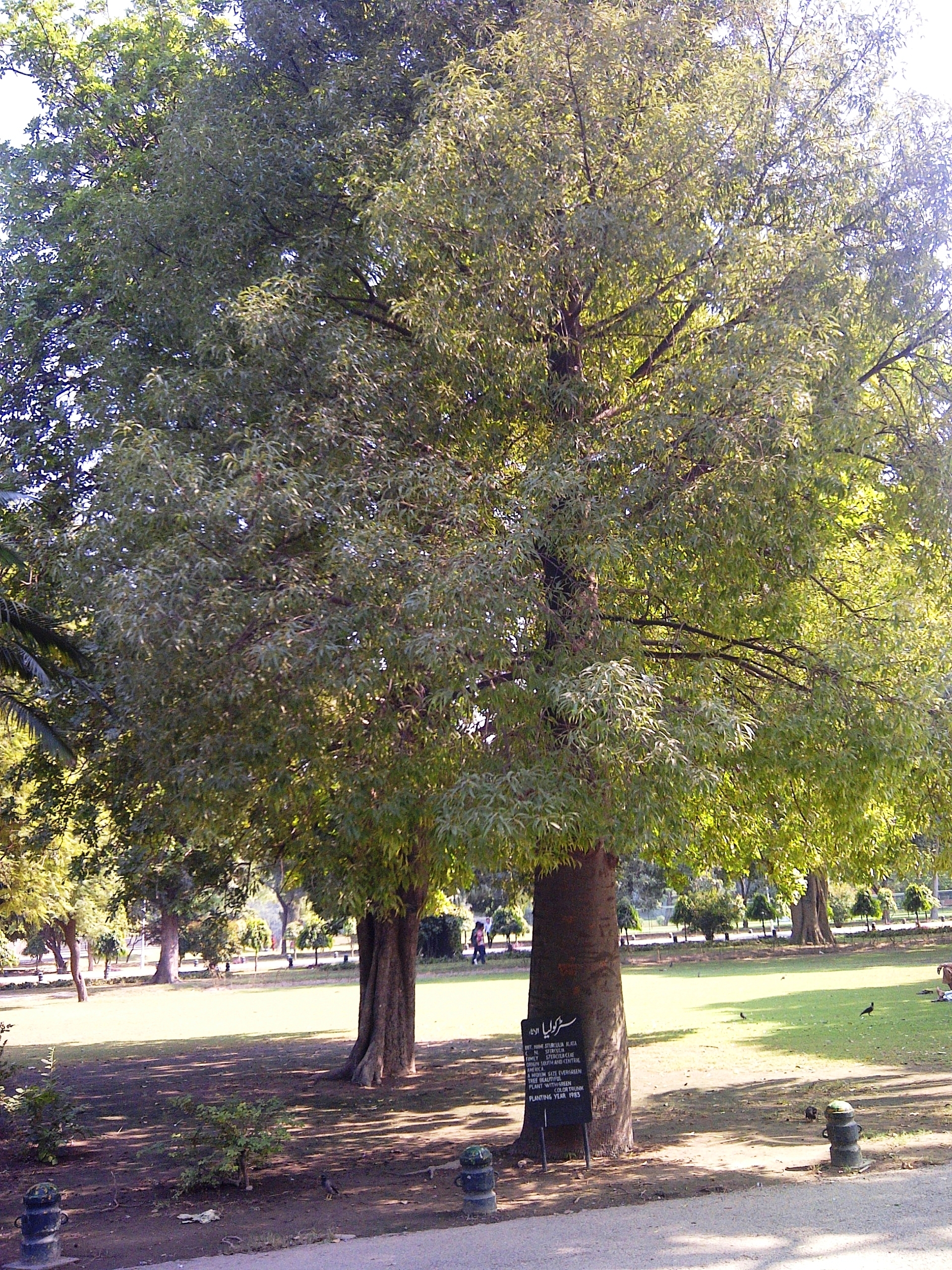
Pterygota alata in Bagh-e-Jinnah

It has almost 150 varieties of trees, 140 types of shrubs, 50 types of creepers, 30 palms, almost 100 succulent and about the same number of indoor plants, along with many varieties of annual flowers. The garden is known for its Chrysanthemum shows; it was the first institute to start growing chrysanthemum and has a large number of varieties. It has 3 nurseries and 4 hillocks.

== Information and services ==
- Bagh-e-Jinnah has two libraries, Quaid-e-Azam library and Darussalam in it.
- Regarding collection of trees, shrubs and climbers a book has been published by Ch. Muhammad Tariq (DDA Jinnah Garden, Muhammad Ramzan Rafique (Agricultural Officer) and Dr. Muhammad Afzal (Instructor). (Flora of Jinnah Garden) This book contains common name, botanical name, flower time, type of plant (deciduous or evergreen), flowering colour of each plant along with its picture. Furthermore, this book contains selective pictures from the palm garden, annual flowers in this garden. This book can be obtained from the office of Jinnah Garden.
- The park receives a nostalgic mention of the 1970s and 1980s life in Bano Qudsia's Urdu novel Raja Gidh.
- The Park has a Tomb of a saint named Peer Sakhi Abul Faizul Hassan commonly known as Baba Turat Muraad Shah, with a heavy number of visitors.
- The park has a track of 2.65 kilometres (1.65 mi).

== Cricket ground ==
Bagh-e-Jinnah, Lahore
- Interactive map of Bagh-e-Jinnah, Lahore
- Location: Lahore, Punjab, Pakistan
- Owner: Pakistan Cricket Board
- Surface: Grass

Bagh-e-Jinnah park is a famous cricket ground since 1885, built for the entertainment of government officers and civil servants. Lahore Gymkhana Club had regular fixtures here. The ground played host to friendly matches, competitive fixtures and host to Pakistan's first unofficial Test against the West Indies in 1948. A few more unofficial Tests later, Bagh-e-Jinnah became a Test venue when Pakistan took on India in 1954–55. New Zealand and West Indies also played a Test here before Bagh-e-Jinnah lost its Test status as it played second fiddle to Gaddafi Stadium but still hosts tour matches involving visiting nations, especially England.

== Gallery ==
Below are some pictures of Bagh-e-Jinnah:

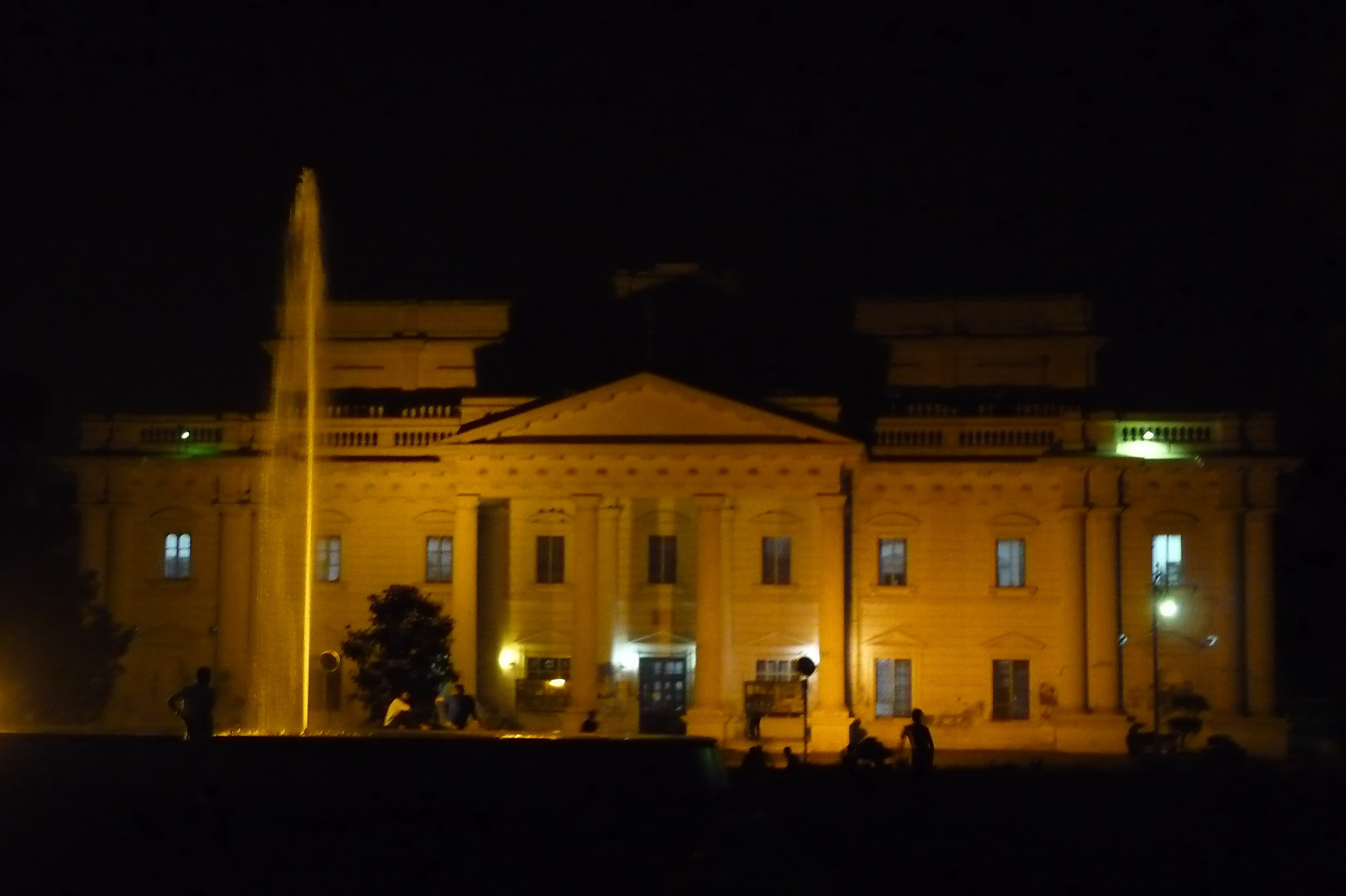
Quaid-e-Azam Library

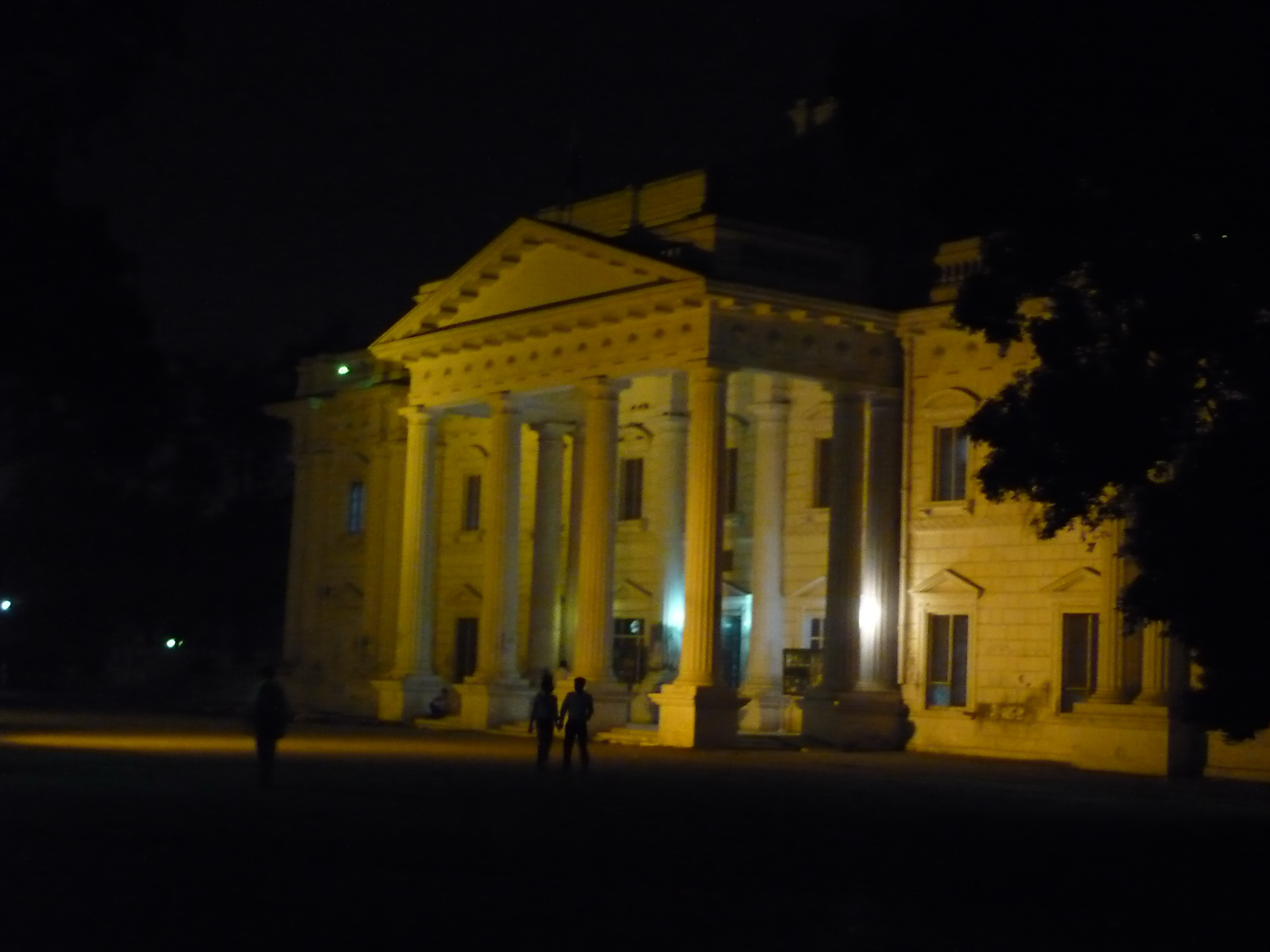
Quaid-e-Azam Library

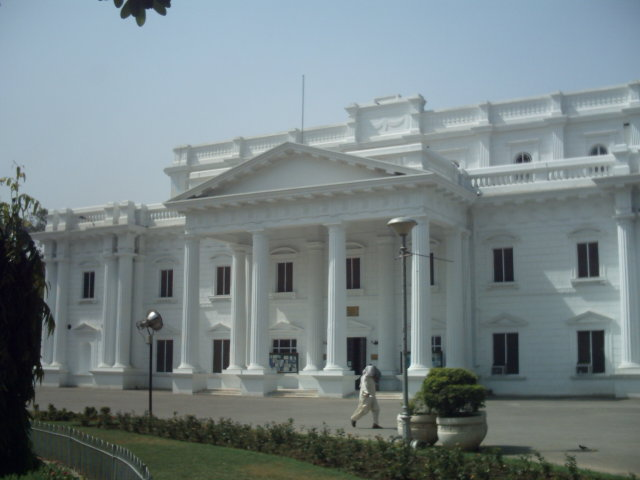
Quaid-e-Azam Library

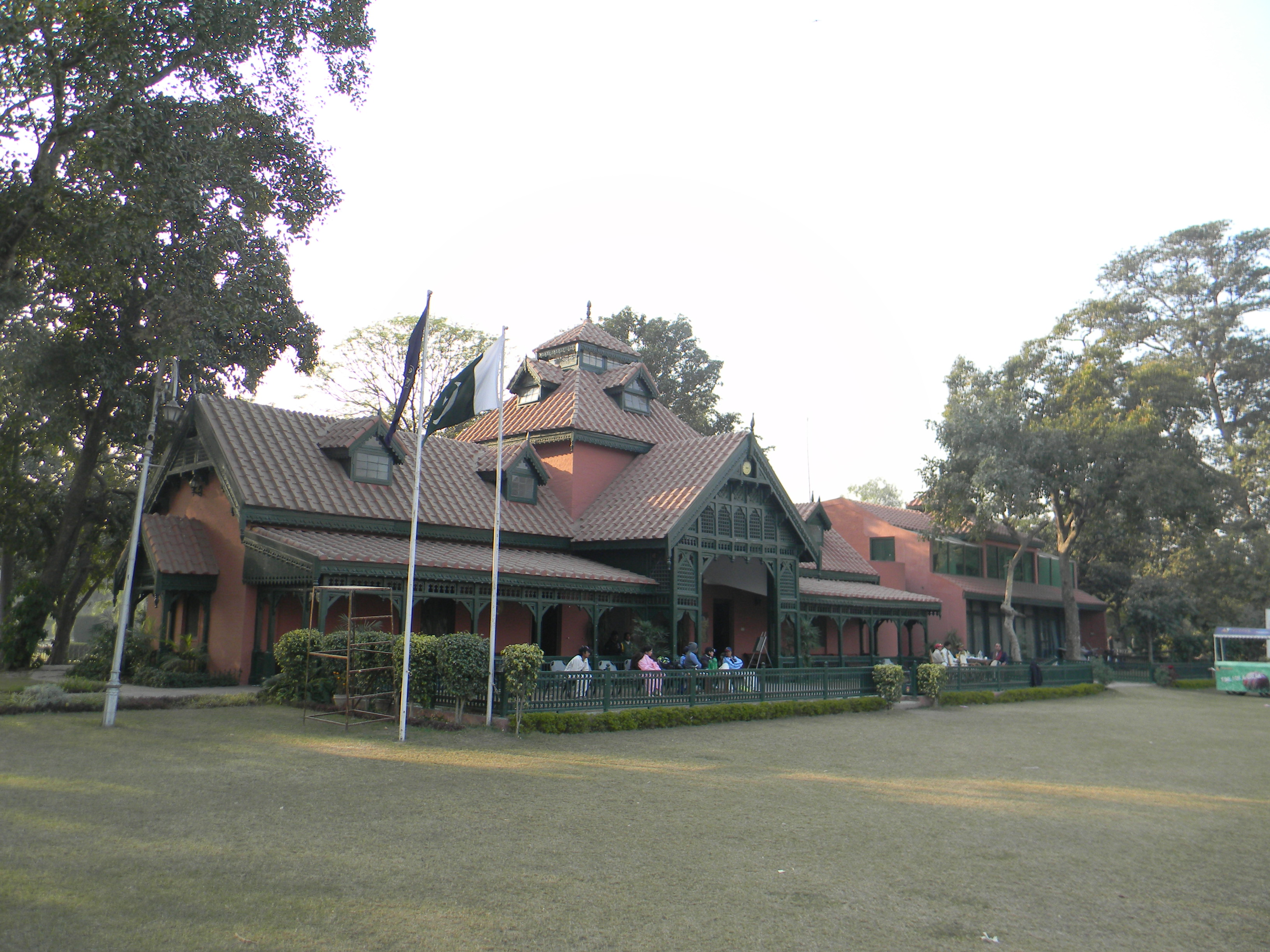
Cricket Ground Pavilion

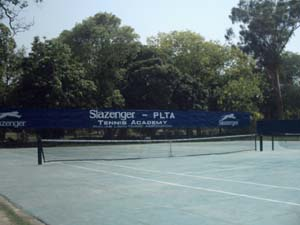
Tennis courts

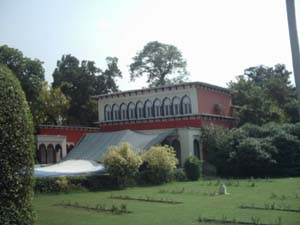
The mosque

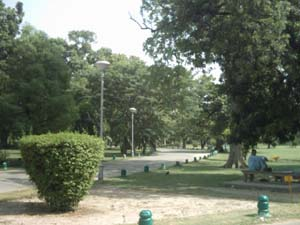
Walking Trail

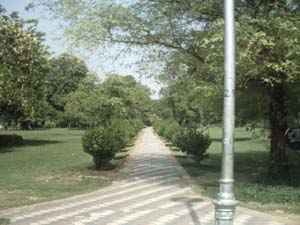
Walking Trail

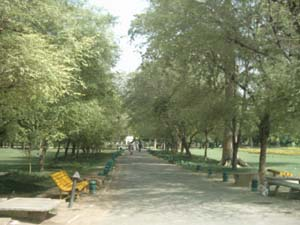
Walking Trail

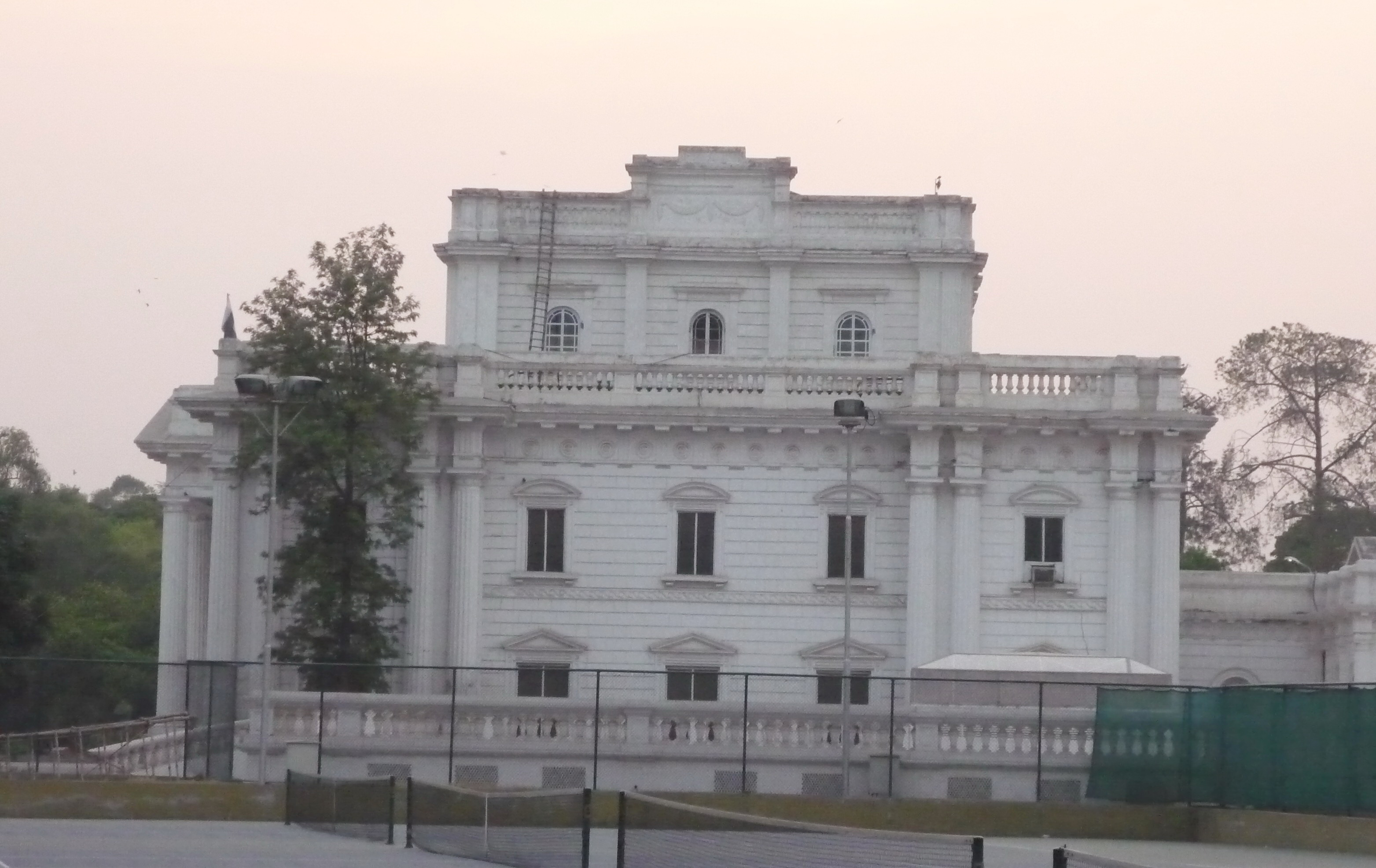
Side view of Library

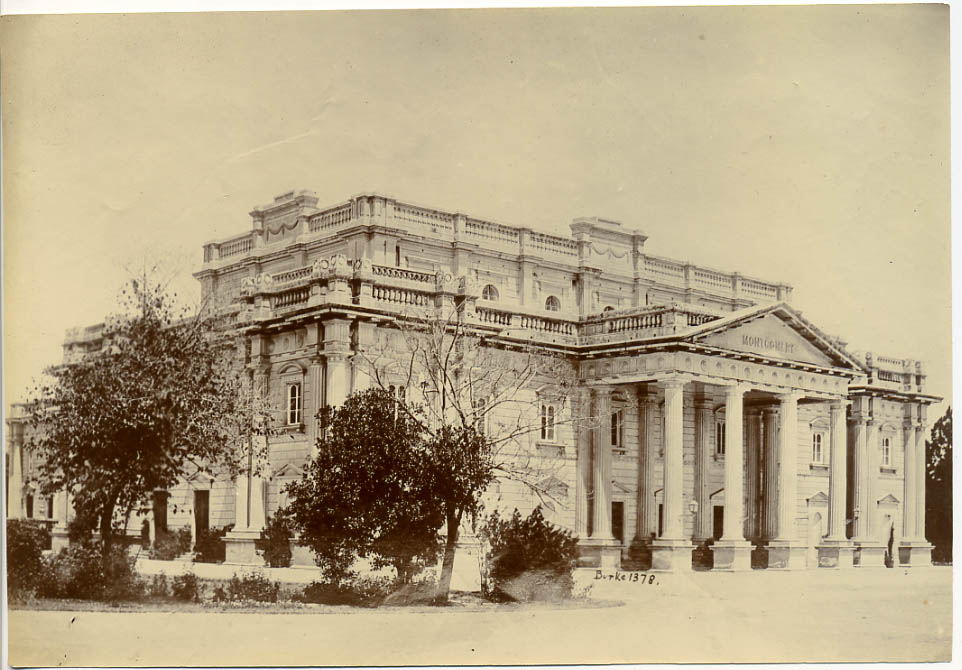
Montgomery Hall 1890s taken by John Burke

== See also ==
- Bāgh
- List of parks and gardens in Lahore
- List of parks and gardens in Pakistan
- List of parks and gardens in Karachi
