= Punjab Public Library, Lahore =

Historic Public Library in Lahore, Pakistan

Govt. Punjab Public Library
- گورنمنٹ. پنجاب پبلک لائبریری
- 31.56796432865095°N 74.30904311656111°E
- Location: Punjab, Pakistan
- Type: Public library
- Established: 1884
- Reference to legal mandate: No 2798

Punjab Public Library is a public library located in Lahore, Pakistan. It was established on 8 November 1884 upon the instructions of the Lieutenant Governor of the Punjab. It was registered under the Societies Registration Act of 1860.

== History ==
The library began operations in the Wazir Khan Baradari (built 1635), an imperial building built by Nawab Wazir Khan, the governor of Lahore, during Emperor Shahjahan's reign with the assistance of the government of the Punjab. Its purpose is to be a public library and reading room.

Other library blocks were built in 1939. A block housing the auditorium and Bait-ul-Quran section was constructed in 1968 and inaugurated by General Mohammad Musa, then governor of West Pakistan.

Punjab Public Library lies in the heart of the city of Lahore at Library Road near the Lahore museum, off Shahrah-e-Quaid-e-Azam. It is surrounded by educational institutions and the Punjab University (Old Campus). The commercial centre of Anarkali, the main offices of the Metropolitan Corporation Lahore (Town Hall) and the provincial government offices, i.e., the Civil Secretariat, are a short distance from this building.

The library holds a collection of books in all fields of knowledge in English, Urdu, Persian, Arabic and Punjabi. Its total collection is about 0.3 million volumes and includes books; bound volumes of back numbers of magazines and newspapers; reports; the old gazettes of Punjab, Pakistan and undivided India; and more than 1500 manuscripts. The library receives 170 magazines, 24 journals by subscription and the rest as free copies. 12 dailies are received in the library.

== Aims and objectives ==
- To provide a public library for the use of all classes of people in the province which contain official publications as well as general literature, both Oriental and Occidental.
- To provide a reading room open to the public, free of charge.
- To contribute to the intellectual advancement of the country.
- To make accessible at one place information that may be required for historical research, or for any other enquiry that depends upon records rather than upon experience.

== Library administration ==
Govt. Punjab Public Library, Lahore, is under the administrative control of the Education Department, Government of the Punjab, Lahore. The Punjab government, vide notification No.SO(A-IV)2-24/2009 dated 25.02.2010, has constituted the following board of governors of the Government Punjab Public Library, Lahore, under the Punjab Government Educational and Training Institutions Ordinance, 1860 (West Pakistan Ordinance No.XI of 1960):

Chief Secretary Punjab, Government of the Punjab, Lahore	Chairman
Secretary Higher Education Department, Government of the Punjab, Lahore	Official member
Secretary School Education Department, Government of the Punjab, Lahore	
Secretary Finance, Government of the Punjab, Lahore	
Secretary Information, Culture & Youth Affairs Department, Government of the Punjab, Lahore	
Director General, Public Libraries, Punjab, Lahore	
Director, Local Fund Audit, Government of the Punjab, Lahore	-
Dr. Khalid Mahmood, chairman, Library Science Department, University of the Punjab, Lahore	Non-official member
Inayat Ullah, retired Federal Secretary, 78/5, Muneer Road, Lahore Cantt	
Mian Allah Nawaz, Chief Justice (R), Lahore High Court, 362-G-III, Johar Town, Lahore	
Khawaja Haris Ahmad, Advocate, Lahore	
Sohail Umar, Director Iqbal Academy, Egerton Road, Lahore	
Arifa Syeda Zohra, Educationist, Lahore	
Chief Librarian/Secretary, Government Punjab Public Library, Lahore	Member/Secretary

== Membership ==
Borrowing facilities are provided to members only.

Membership category	Security fee (refundable)	Annual fee
General membership	Rs. 1000	Rs. 300
Student membership	Rs. 500	Rs. 50
Child membership	Rs. 500	Rs. 50
Life membership	Rs. 5000 (one donation only)	

== Sections ==
The library has the following sections:

Acquisition section

This is used for acquiring books for the library from booksellers. The selection of books is made by a book purchase committee which also includes subject specialists. Readers' suggestions are given consideration when purchasing books for the library. A book selection policy is followed for the purchase of books, and government procedures are followed for payment of the bills. Books are accessioned here, payments are made and the material is then sent to the technical section for processing. Suggestion books to be used for suggesting books for the library or making other proposals are provided.

Technical section

Books and other material received from the acquisition section are provided with labels and stamps and are classified and catalogued. D.D.C. 20th Edition is used for subject analysis while A.A.C.R-2 is followed for cataloguing. Cards are typewritten. Reference material is kept in the reference section and all other books are sent to the library shelves for circulation.

Circulation section

On the first floor of the English section there is an English counter at which books for home study are issued and received back. Oriental language books are issued at the counter in the Oriental section. Approximately 250 books are issued or received back at these counters every day.

Reference section

The reference section is frequented by students, research scholars and the public throughout the library working hours. It contains reference works such as encyclopaedias, dictionaries, yearbooks, directories, almanacs, atlases, gazetteers, etc. along with reference works in subject fields. The official gazettes of Punjab and Pakistan kept in this section are important sources of information for many people of the city and rural areas of various districts of Punjab. Bound files of newspapers are available.

The section serves its readers by providing census reports, patents and designs, and back numbers of English magazines. This section is useful for students preparing for such competitive examinations as CSS and PCS. The section is staffed by library professionals and information specialists.

The Bait-ul-Quran

This section of the library was established in 1968 by Mukhtar Masood, then commissioner of the Lahore Division, and inaugurated by then governor of West Pakistan, General Muhammad Musa. It contains manuscripts of the Quran, some dating back to 500 years. The section houses copies of handwritten and printed Qurans collected from all over Pakistan, e.g., the photocopies of the Quran remained under recitation of Usman Ghani, Amam Jaffer Sadiq, Molana Rom, Tipu Sultan and a hand written Quran by Aurangzeb Alamgir, Emperor of India. Translations and commentaries of the Quran in different languages and other works of Quranic literature are placed in this section for the use of research scholars. A mural painting by an artist of Pakistan, Shakir Ali, depicts Quranic Ayats in fine calligraphy and decorates the section.

Children's section

A separate children's section was established in March 1982. Material comprises illustrated books, children encyclopaedias and dictionaries, science and adventure books, illustrated fiction, biographies, historical and Islamic books, books on Quaid-e-Azam and Allama Muhammad Iqbal, as well as on Pakistan, both in English and Urdu languages. it contains about 6,000 volumes.

Oriental section

The section has about 125,000 volumes in languages including Urdu, Persian, Arabic, Punjabi, Pushto, Sindhi and Balochi.

Some rare books possessed by the section have been bound in cloth and leather. The building has now fallen short of its requirements with respect to additional books and the increasing number of readers.

Computer section and e-library

The computer section of the library was established in 1993 and became functional in 1996. A catalogue of the books in the library has been computerized and readers have been provided browsing facility on computers.

Internet service is provided to the public at a nominal charge of Rs. 10/- per hour. CD writing and printing is available in the section.

AVA section

The section contains microfilm readers, microfilm reader/printers, TV and VCR equipment with more than 600 video films available. An LCD TV has been provided in the section by courtesy of the Punjab Library Foundation.

Other sections of the library are:

- Bindery
- Account section
- Hindi, Gurumukhi, Sanskrit section
- Records section
- Gazetteer/gazette, report section
- Old newspaper & magazine section
- Braille section

== Collections ==
Collections which have been donated are as follows:

- Riffat Sultana Memorial Collection: This is the largest collection donated to this library by any individual. Dr. Mumtaz Hassan, a scholar and governor, State Bank of Pakistan, donated about 9,000 volumes to the library in the memory of his daughter, Riffat Sultana. The collection has been placed in a section known as the Riffat Sultana Memorial Collection. It has been functioning in the library since 1963.
- Prof. Abdul Qadir Collection
- Mulana Muhammad Ali Qasuri Collection
- Abdul Hamid Collection
- Dr. Azhar Ali Collection

== Facilities ==
- Book reservation: Books can be reserved in both the English and Oriental sections of the library. As soon as a book which has been reserved is received back in the library, the borrower is informed of its availability.
- Photocopying: The library has two photocopying machines for providing readers with photocopies of required material.
- Library catalogue: Dictionary catalogues have been provided for the English and Oriental sections as well as the other collections of the library. Books can be searched by consulting the catalogues for authors, titles or subjects. The computerized catalogue is also available at the circulation desk.
- Reader/reference services: Reader/reference assistance is available for students, readers and research scholars.
- Cultural activities: To make the library a hub of cultural activities, a series of lectures has been started on educational, literary, Islamic and library topics for readers, students and scholars. Scholars and persons of repute are invited to deliver these lectures.

== Classification scheme ==
For arrangement of reading material the Dewey Decimal Classification scheme is followed. The 19th edition of this scheme is being used along with AACR2 and the 15th edition of the Sears List of Subject Headings. Sometimes a number which is difficult to build from the 19th edition is built from the 20th edition.

== Funding ==
The Punjab government provides an annual grant-in-aid amounting to Rs. 16 million. Another source of income is the nominal membership fee.

== Presidents of the Managing Committees ==
Name	Designation	Period
Rai Bahadur Sir P. Chatterjee	Judge, Chief Court Punjab	1900–1917
Mr. Justice Sir Shadi Lal	Chief Judge High Court, Punjab	1917–1933
Justice Kanwar Dalip Singh	Judge, High Court, Punjab	1933–1947
Mian Bashir Ahmad	Editor, Hamayun	1947–1949
Justice S.A. Rahman	Judge, High Court, Lahore	1949–1956
Mian Bashir Ahmad	Editor, Hamayun	1956–1966
Mukhtar Masood	Commissioner, Lahore	1966–1969
Malik Abdul Latif Khan	Secretary Education, Government of the Punjab	1969–1970
Dr. Z.A.Hashmi		1969–1970
Namdar Khan		1970–1972
Prof. M. Rashid		1972–1975
Dr. M. Tariq Siddiquei		1975-1975
Prof. M. Rashid		1975–1977
Muhammad Siddiq Chaudhry		1977–1978
M.H. Jafry		1978-1978
Prof. Abdul Qayyum Qureshi		1978-1978
Brig. Muhammad Ikram Amin		1978–1980
Muhammad Azhar		1980-1980
Muhammad Safdar Kazmi		1980–1981
Ahmad Sadik		1981–1984
Syed Asad Ali Shah		1984-1984
Karamat Ali Khan		1984–1986
Haji Muhammad Akram		1986–1987
Jiwan Khan		1987–1988
Sheikh Zahoor-ul-Haq		1988–1989
Tariq Sultan		1989–1991
Ameenullah Chaudhry		1991–1992
Tanvir Ahmad Khan		1992–1996
Tasneem Noorani		1996–1998

== Librarians and Chief Librarians ==
Name	Designation	Period
Lala Kirpa Ram	Librarian	1886–1913
Lala Labhu Ram	Librarian	1913–1921
Vidya Saggar Gorawara	Librarian	1921–1923
Lala Ram Labhaya	Librarian	1923–1947
Khawaja Nur Elahi	Librarian	1947–1966
Sh. Zia-ul-Haq	Librarian	1966–1979
Muhammad Aslam	Acting Librarian	1979-1979
Abdul Nasr	Acting Librarian	1979-1979
Muhammad Riaz	Librarian	1979–1982
Muhammad Aslam	Secretary/Chief Librarian	1982–1988
S. Maqsood Ali Kazmi	Secretary/Chief Librarian	1988–1994
Hafiz Khuda Bakhsh	Act. Secretary/Chief Librarian	1994–1995
S. Maqsood Ali Kazmi	Secretary/Chief Librarian	1995–1998
Hafiz Khuda Bakhsh	Act. Secretary/Chief Librarian	1998–2000
Zil-e- Hasnain	Chief Librarian (Acting Charge)	2001–2009
Azra Usman	Chief Librarian (Acting Charge)	2010–2015
Nusrat Ali Aseer	Chief Librarian (Acting Charge)	2015-2015
Dr. Zaheer Ahmad Babar	Chief Librarian/Secretary BOG/DGPL Punjab	July 2015- July 2018
Abdul Ghafoor	Chief Librarian (Additional Charge)	July 2018- to date
