= Baradari (building) =

Type of building

Baradari, also spelt as Bara Dari, is a building or pavilion with twelve doors designed to allow free flow of air. The structure has three doorways on every side of the square-shaped structure.

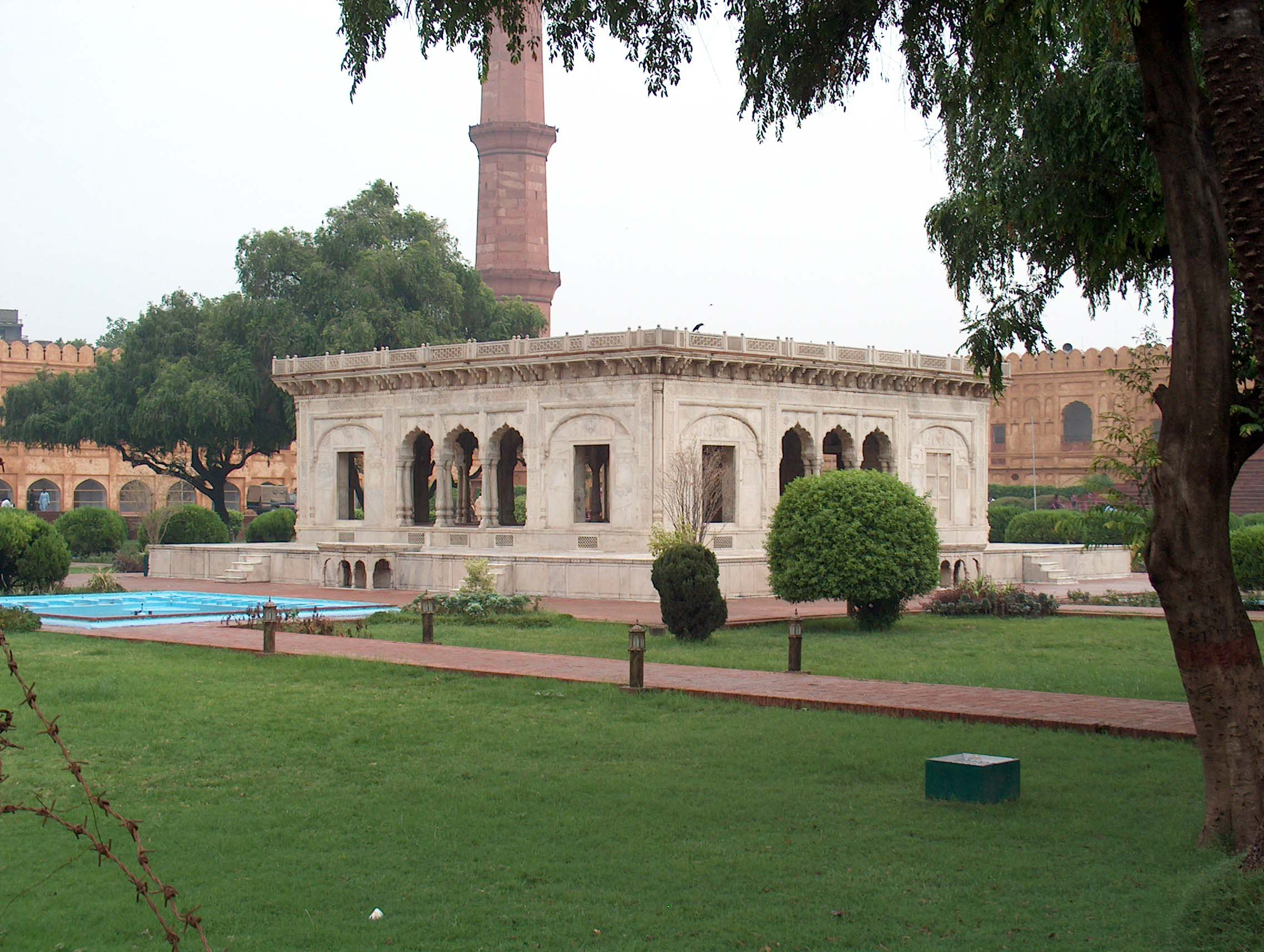
Hazuri Bagh Baradari in Hazuri Bagh, Lahore, Pakistan

Because of their outstanding acoustic features, these buildings were particularly well-suited for mujra dance or courtesan dance performances by the noble courtesans. They were also well-suited for live performances and private concerts by various musicians and poets in front of the ruling kings of the time. They were also valued for their fresh air during hot summers of India. Bara in Urdu/Hindi means Twelve and the word Dar means 'door'.

== Notable examples ==
Some of the historic baradaris include Taramati Baradari, Hazuri Bagh Baradari, Wazir Khan Baradari, Goshamahal Baradari, Lucknow Baradari, Baradari at Hiran Minar, Baradari at Daulatabad Fort, and Baradari at Palace of Man Singh I at Amber Fort, among others.

== Gallery ==
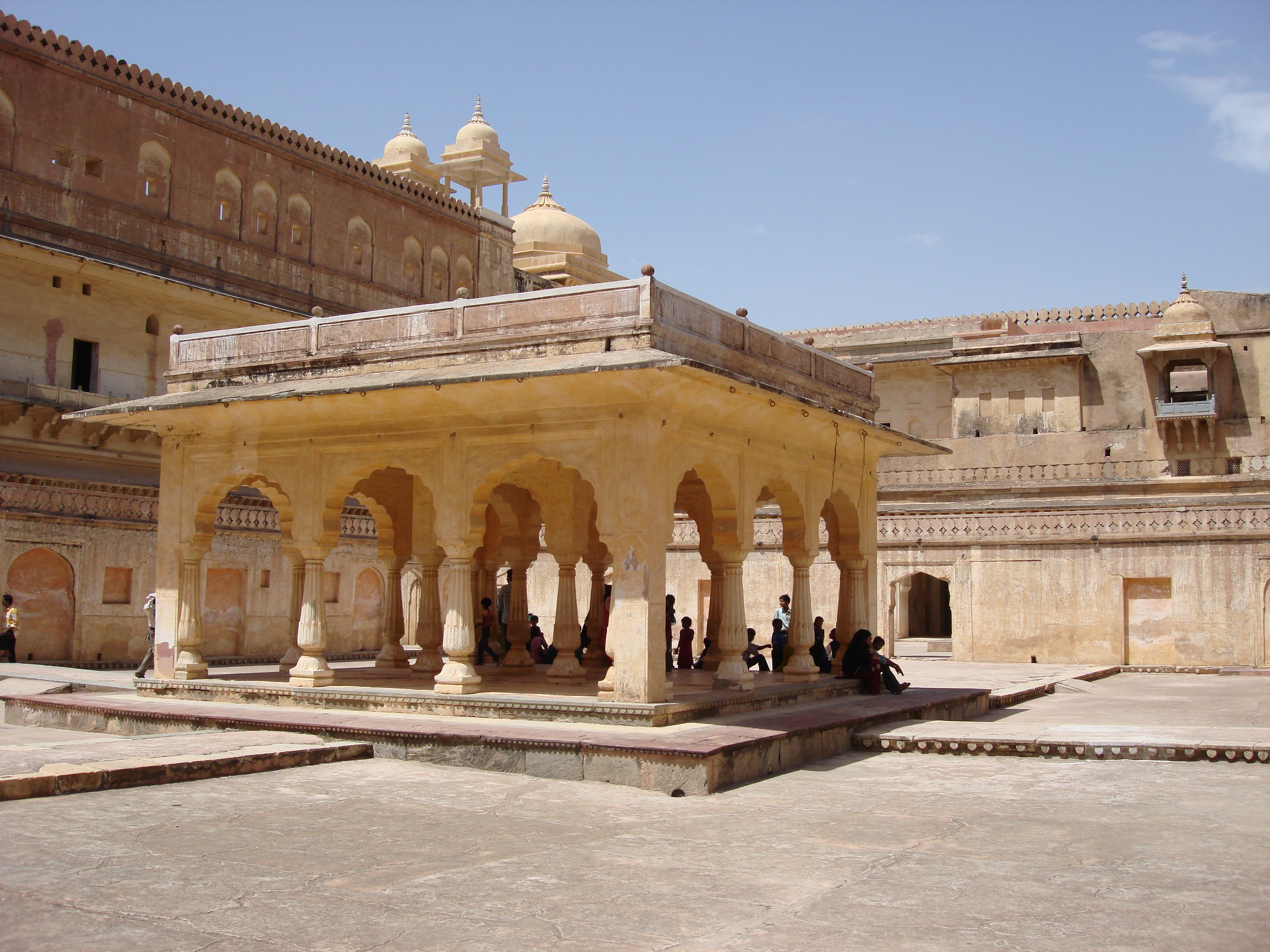
Baradari at Mansingh Mahal, Amber Fort, Jaipur

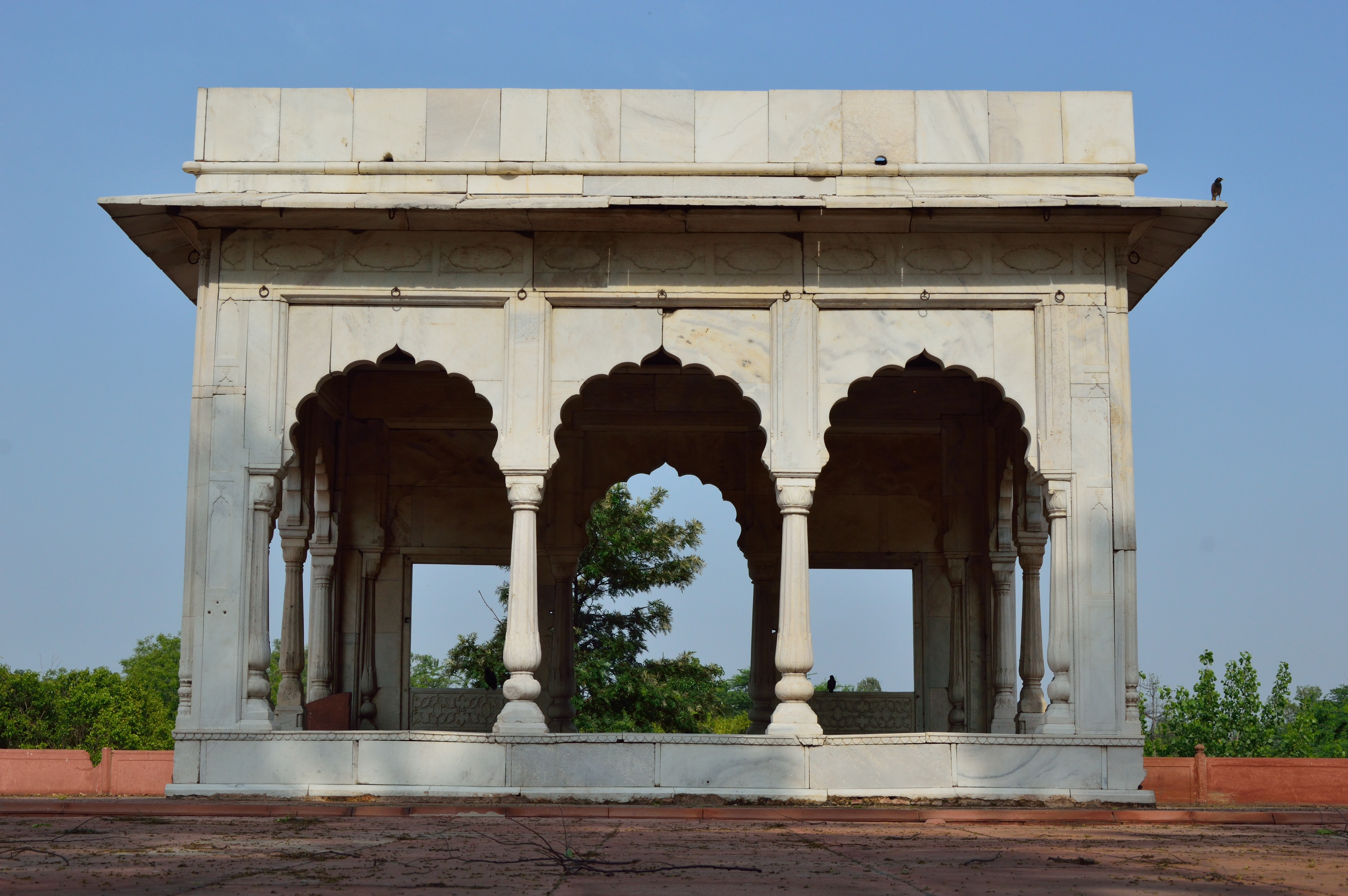
Heera Mahal Baradari, Red Fort, Delhi

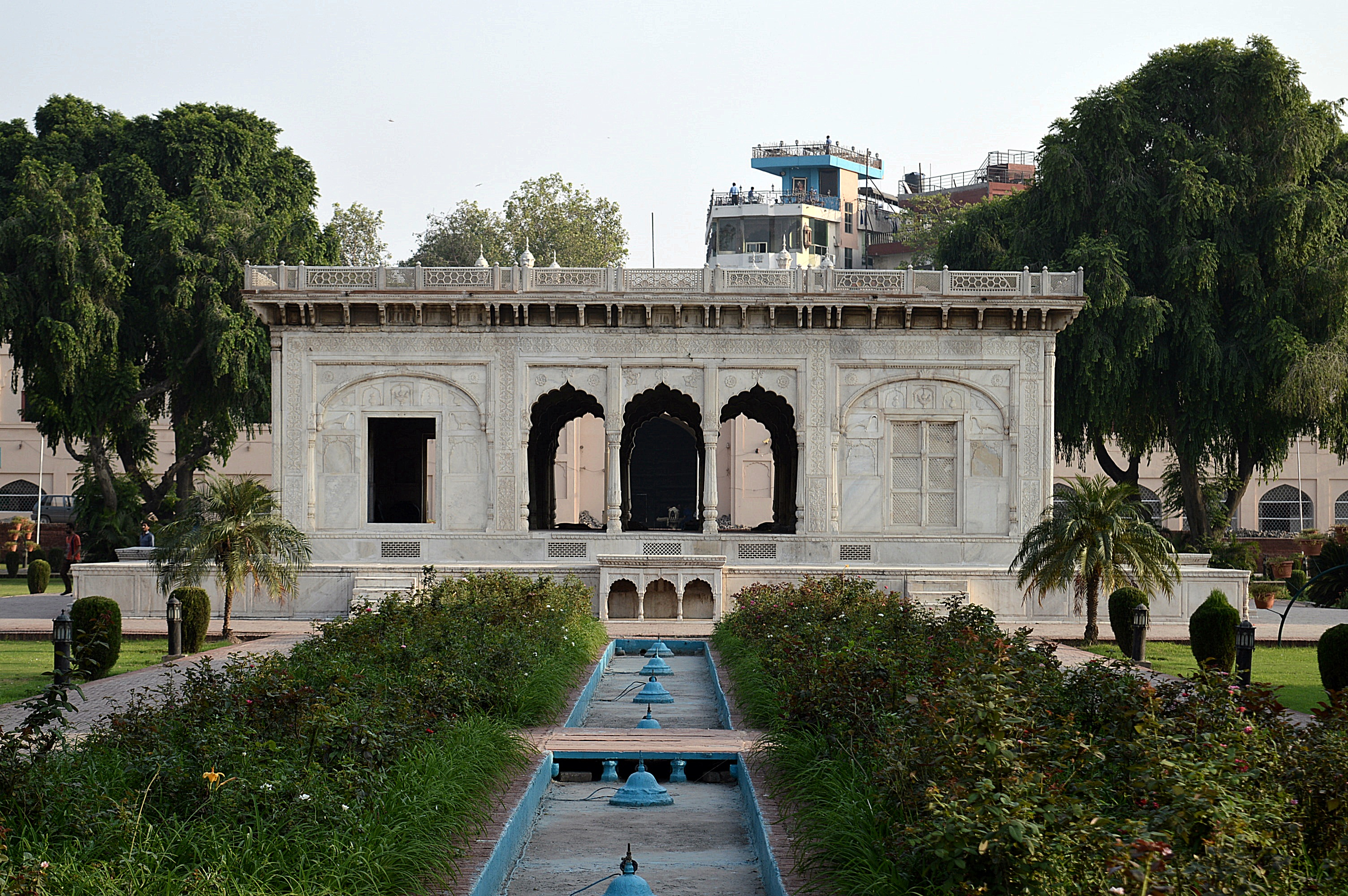
Hazuri Bagh Baradari, Hazuri Bagh, Lahore

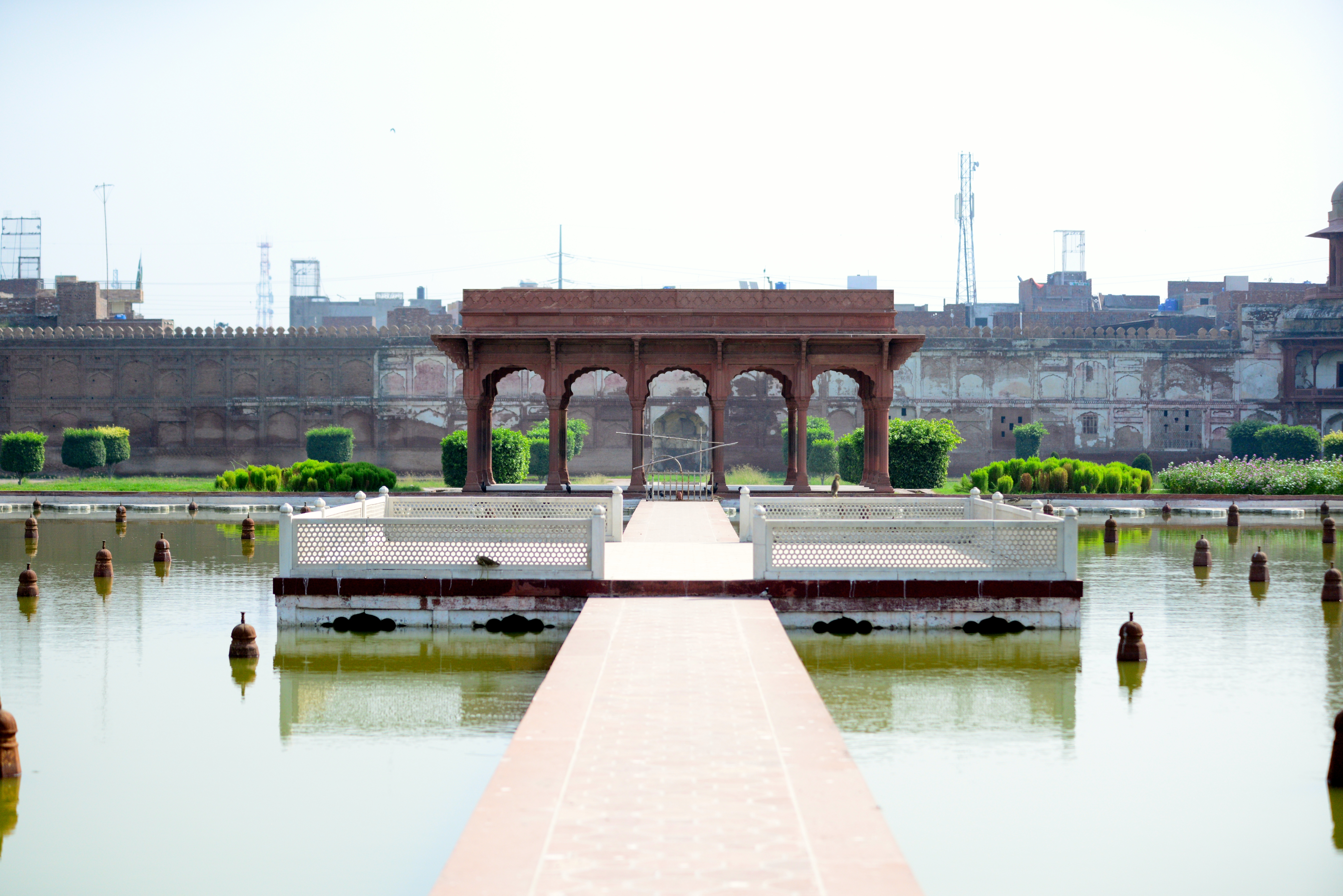
Baradari at Shalimar Gardens, Lahore

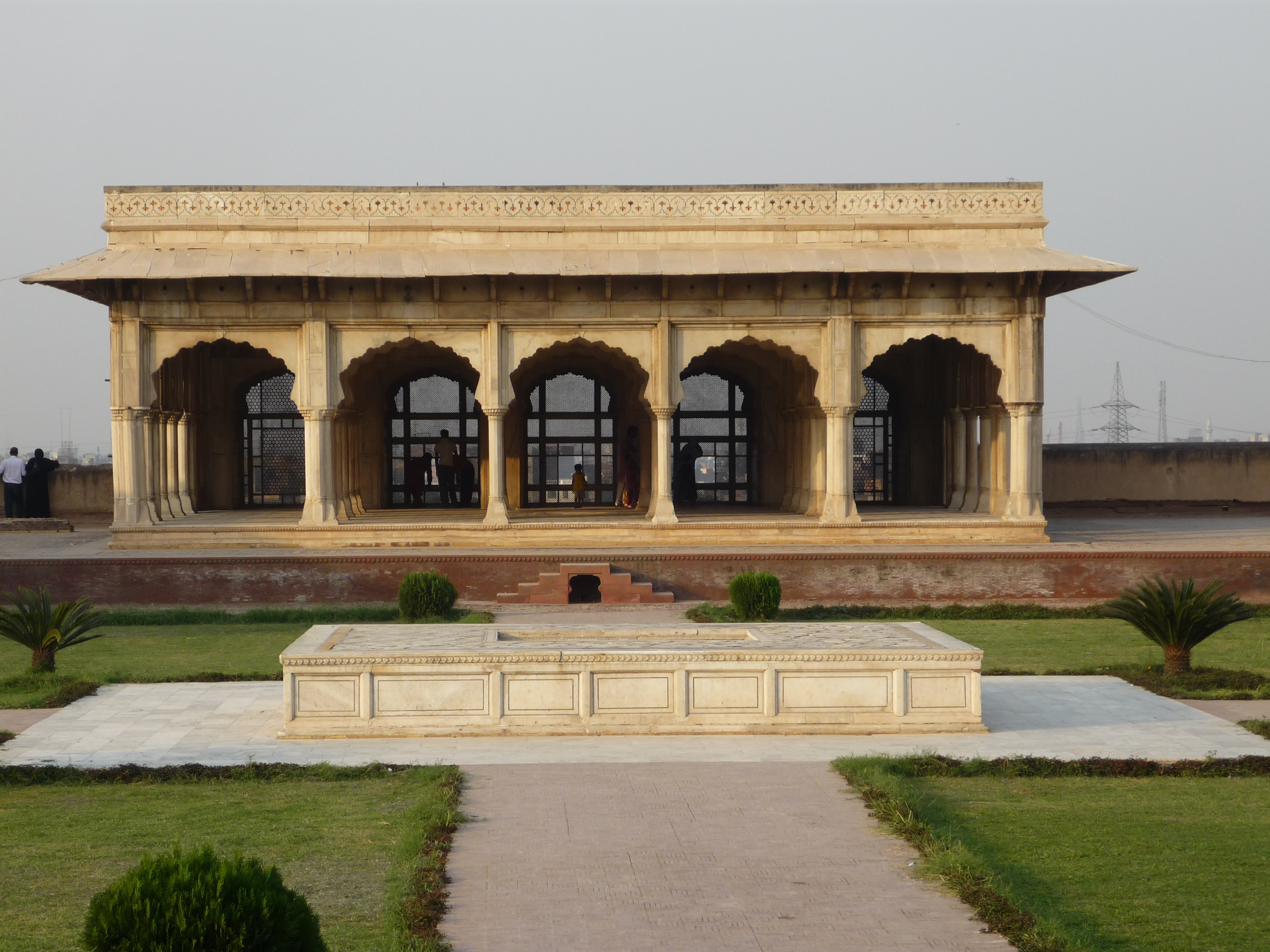
Lahore Fort Baradari

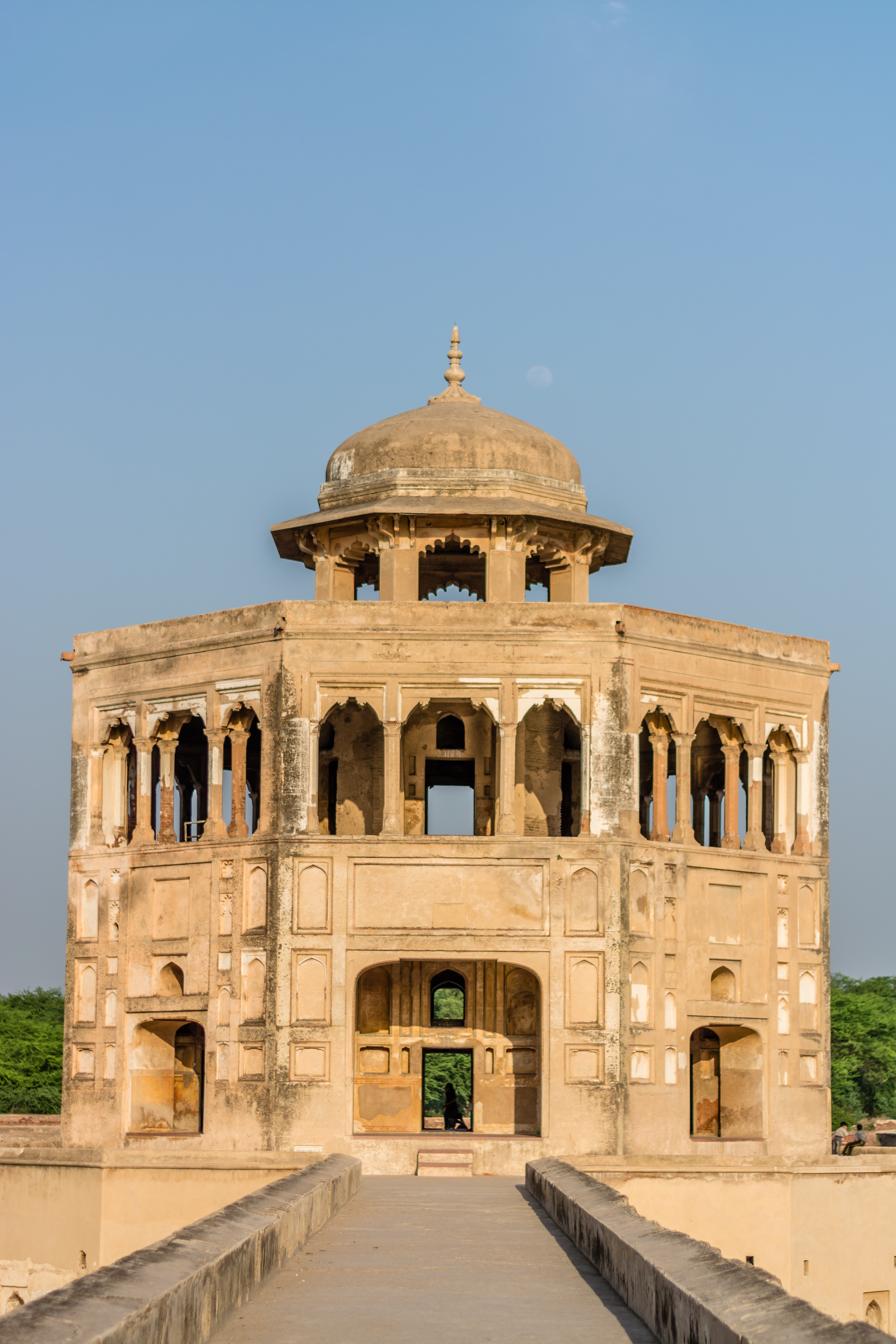
Baradari at Hiran Minar, Sheikhupura, Pakistan

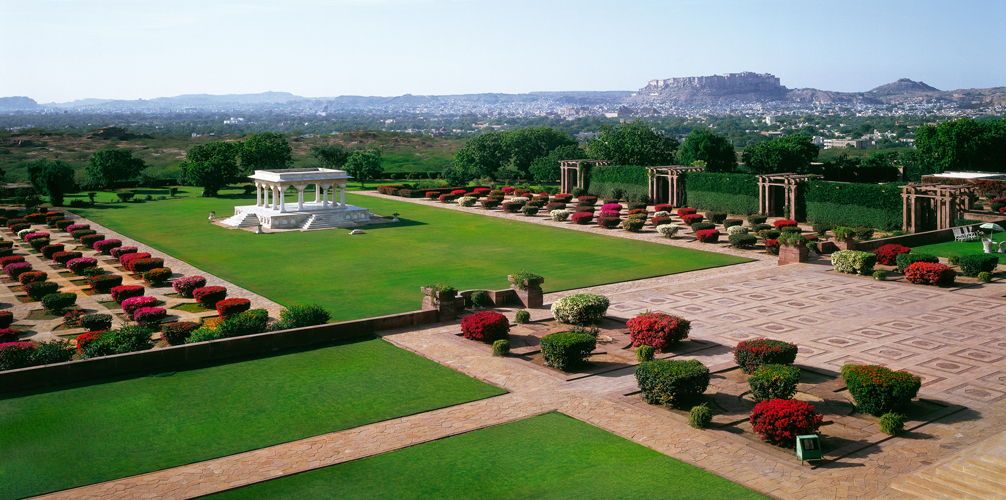
Baradari at Umaid Bhawan Palace, Jodhpur

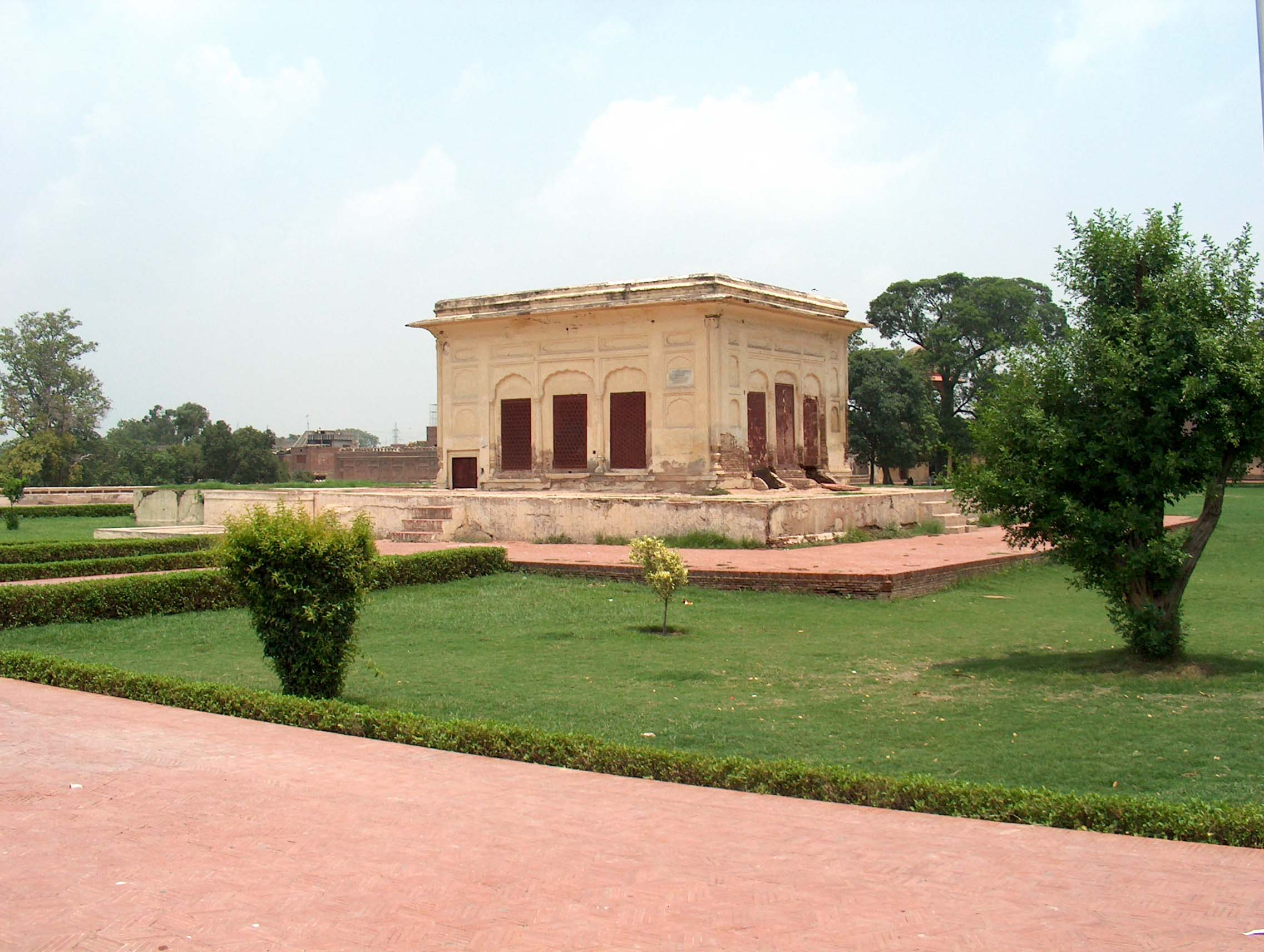
Baradari at Shalimar Gardens, Lahore

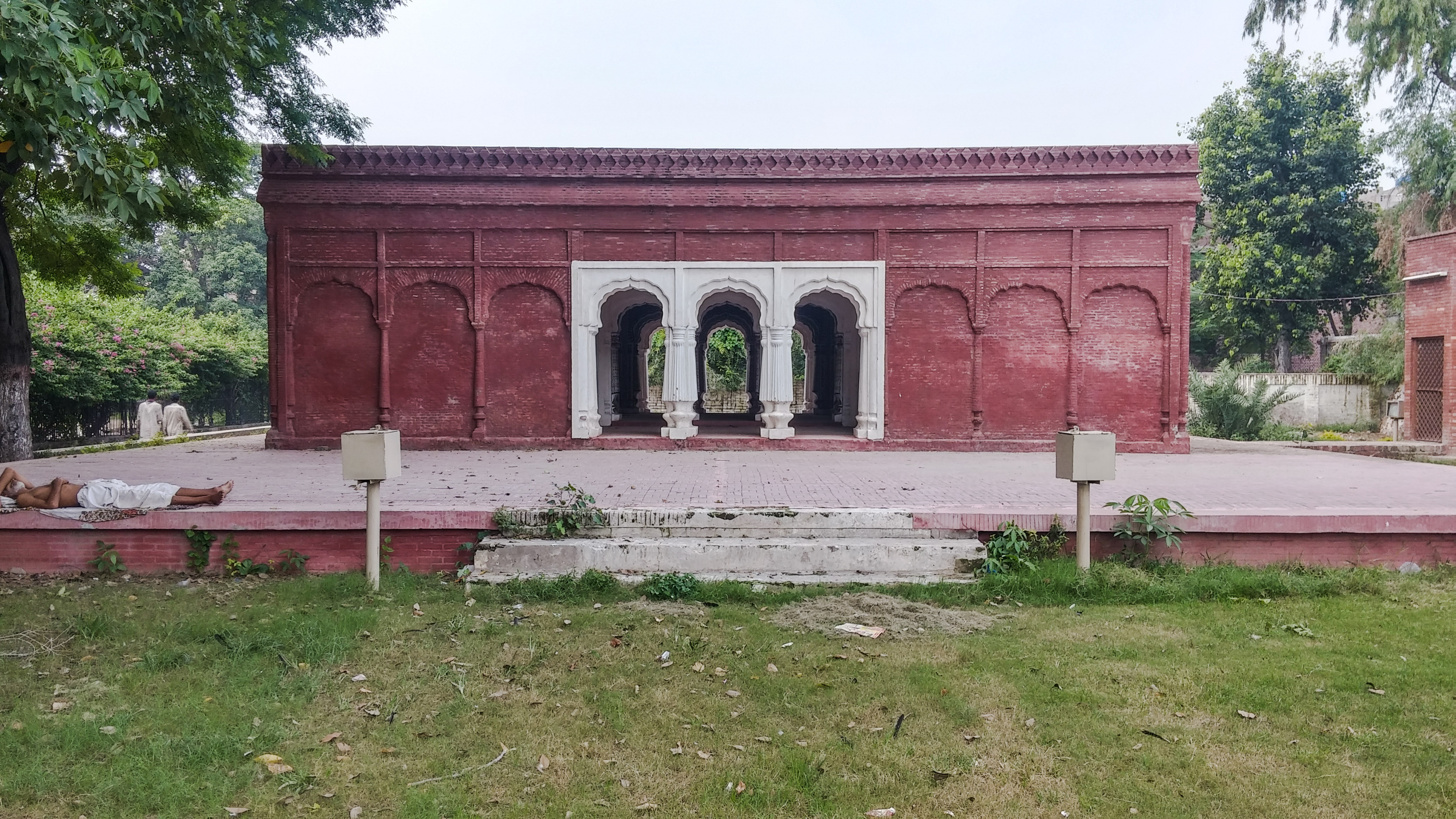
Sheranwala Bagh Baradari, Gujranwala

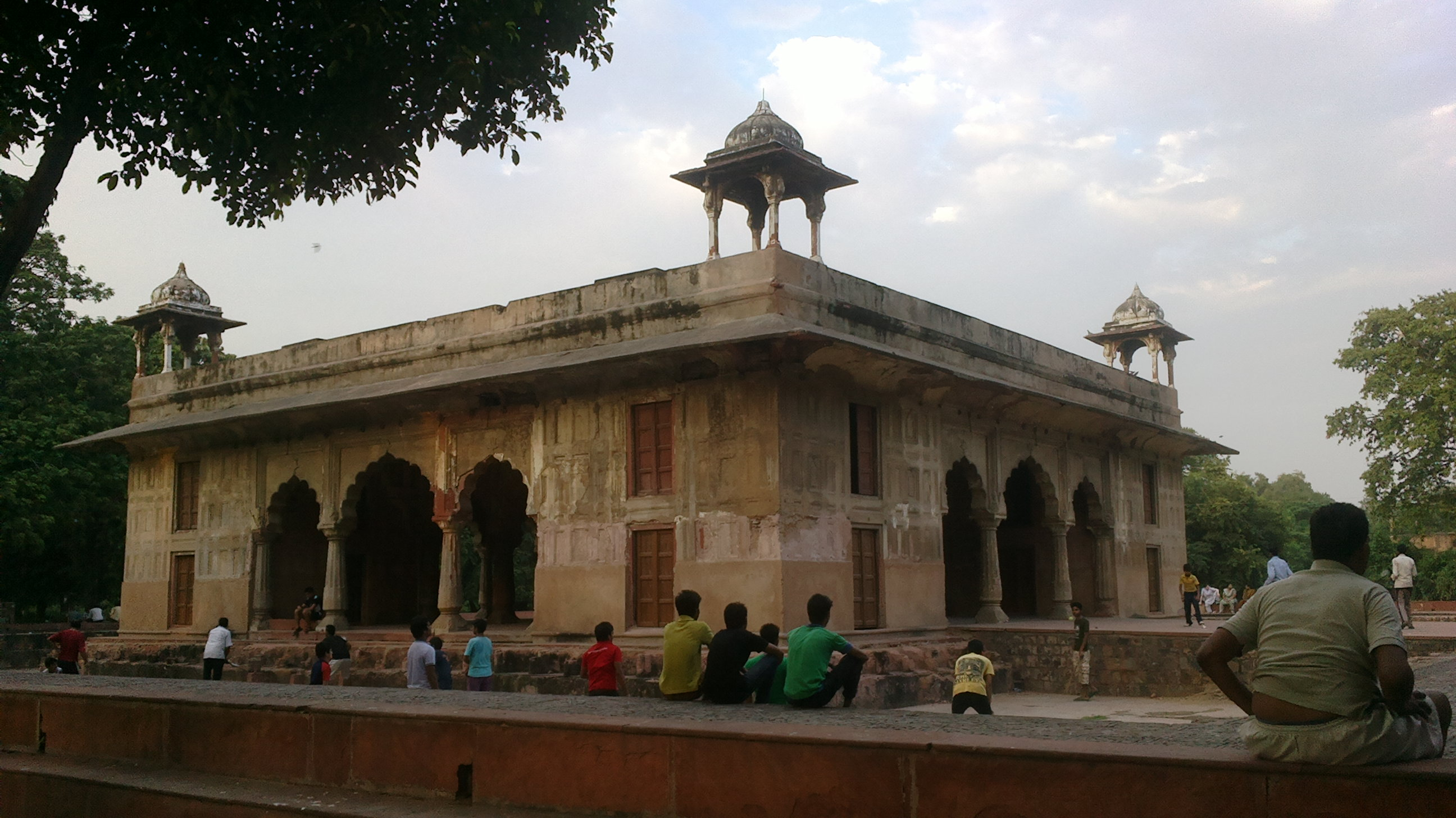
Baradari at Roshanara Bagh, Delhi

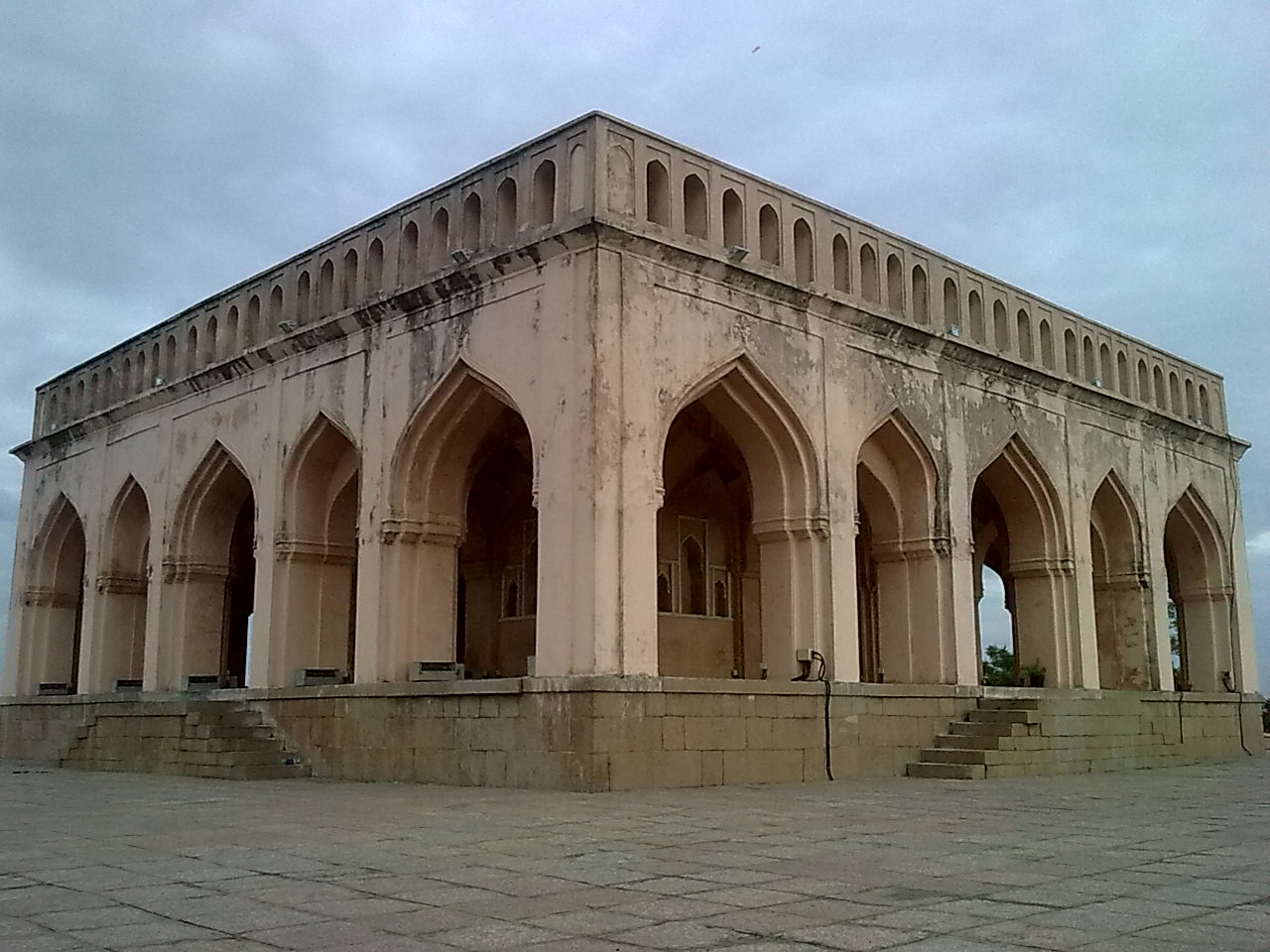
Taramati Baradari, Hyderabad

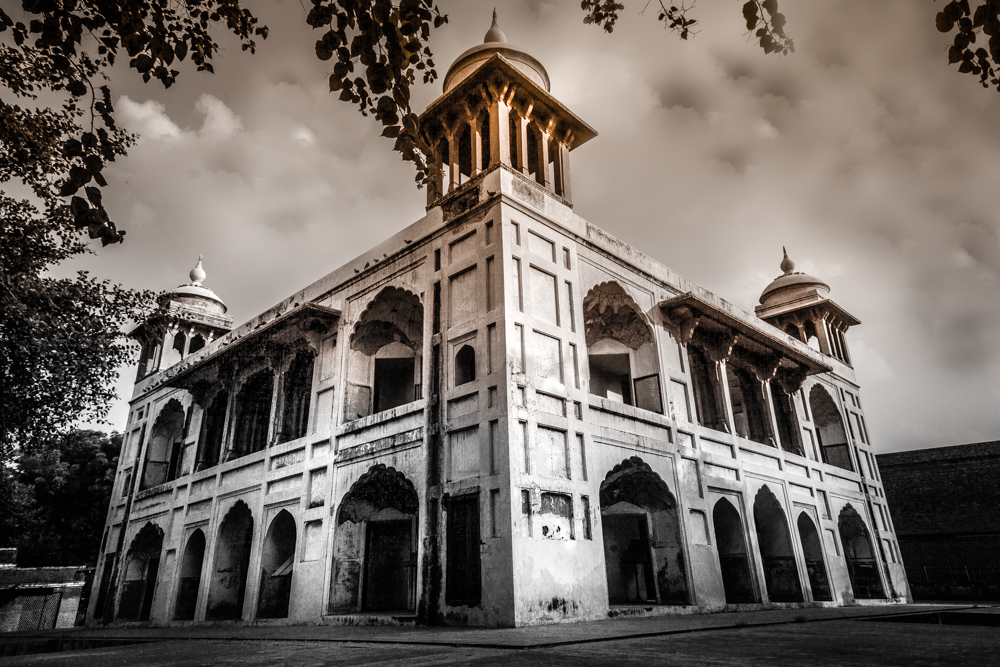
Wazir Khan Baradari, Lahore

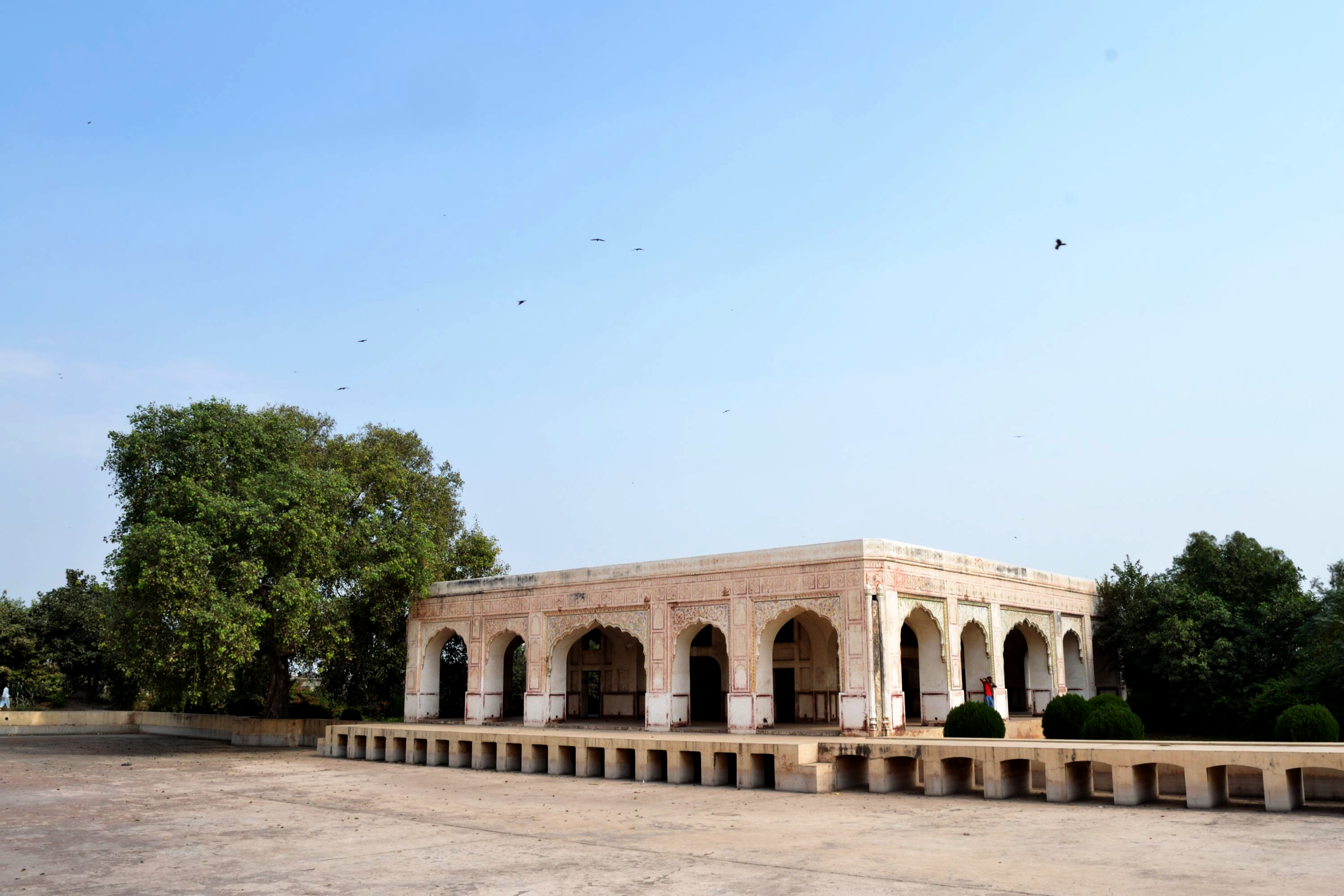
Baradari of Kamran Mirza, Lahore

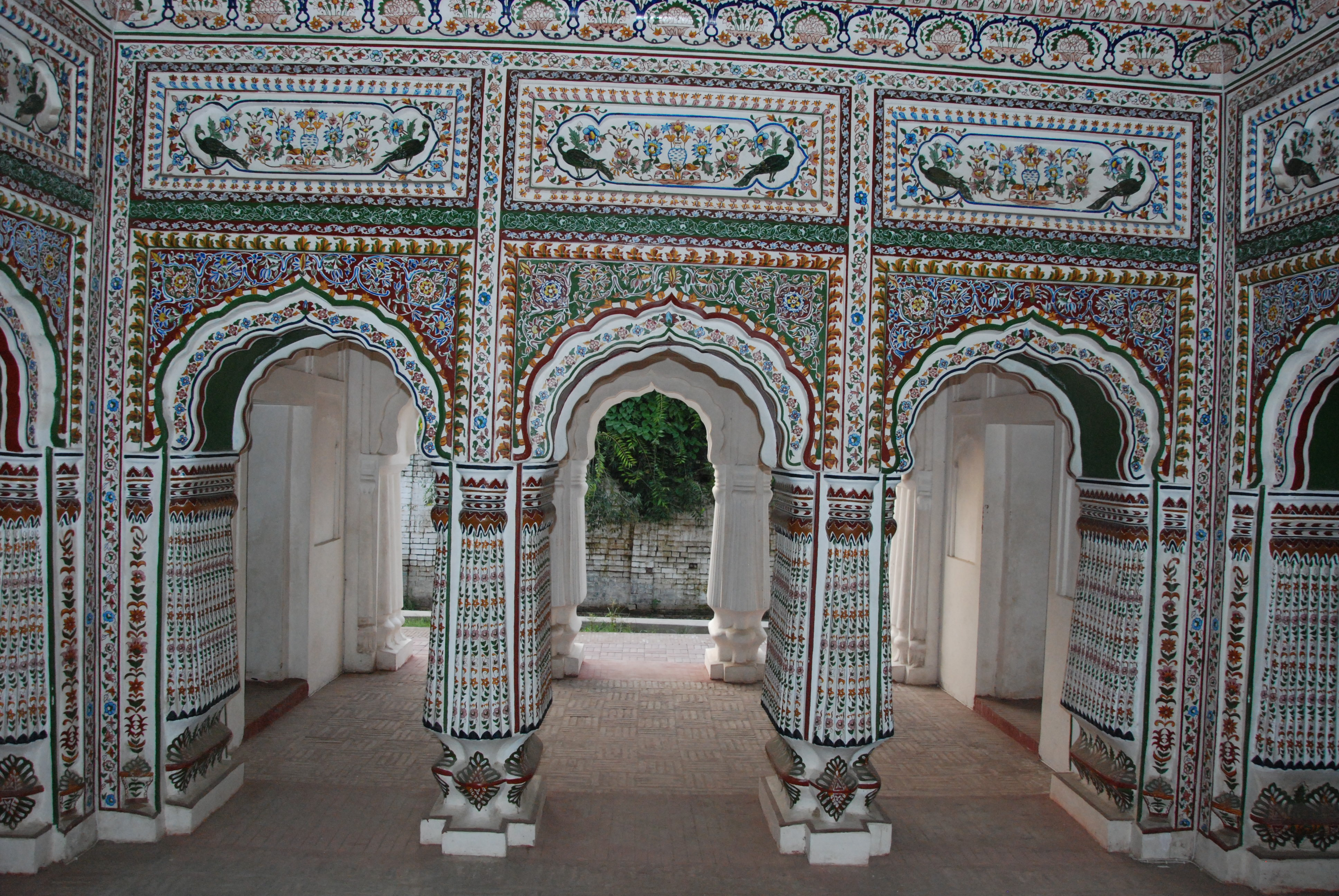
Inner View of Baradari at Sherawala Garden, Gujranwala

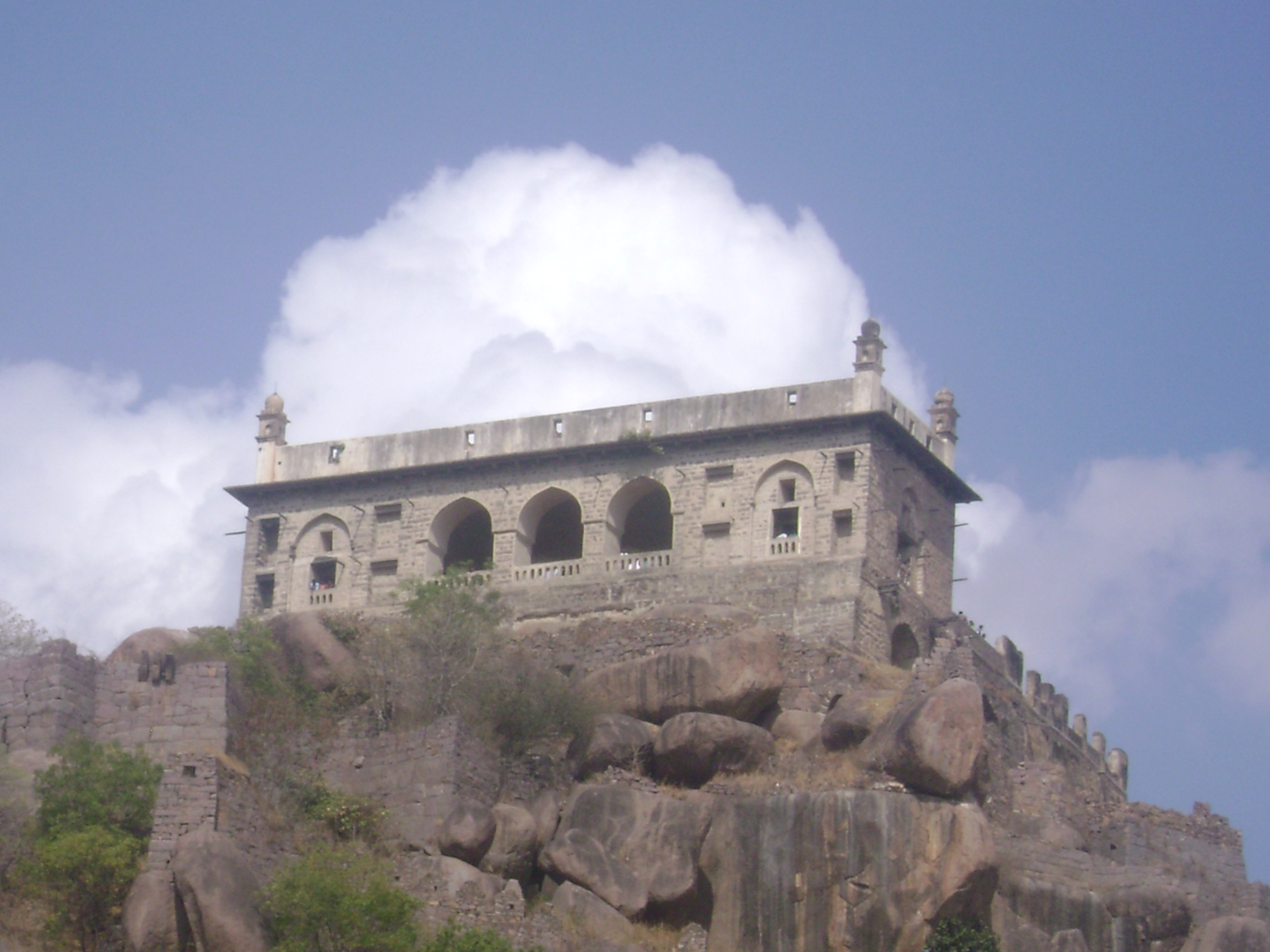
Baradari of the Golconda Fort

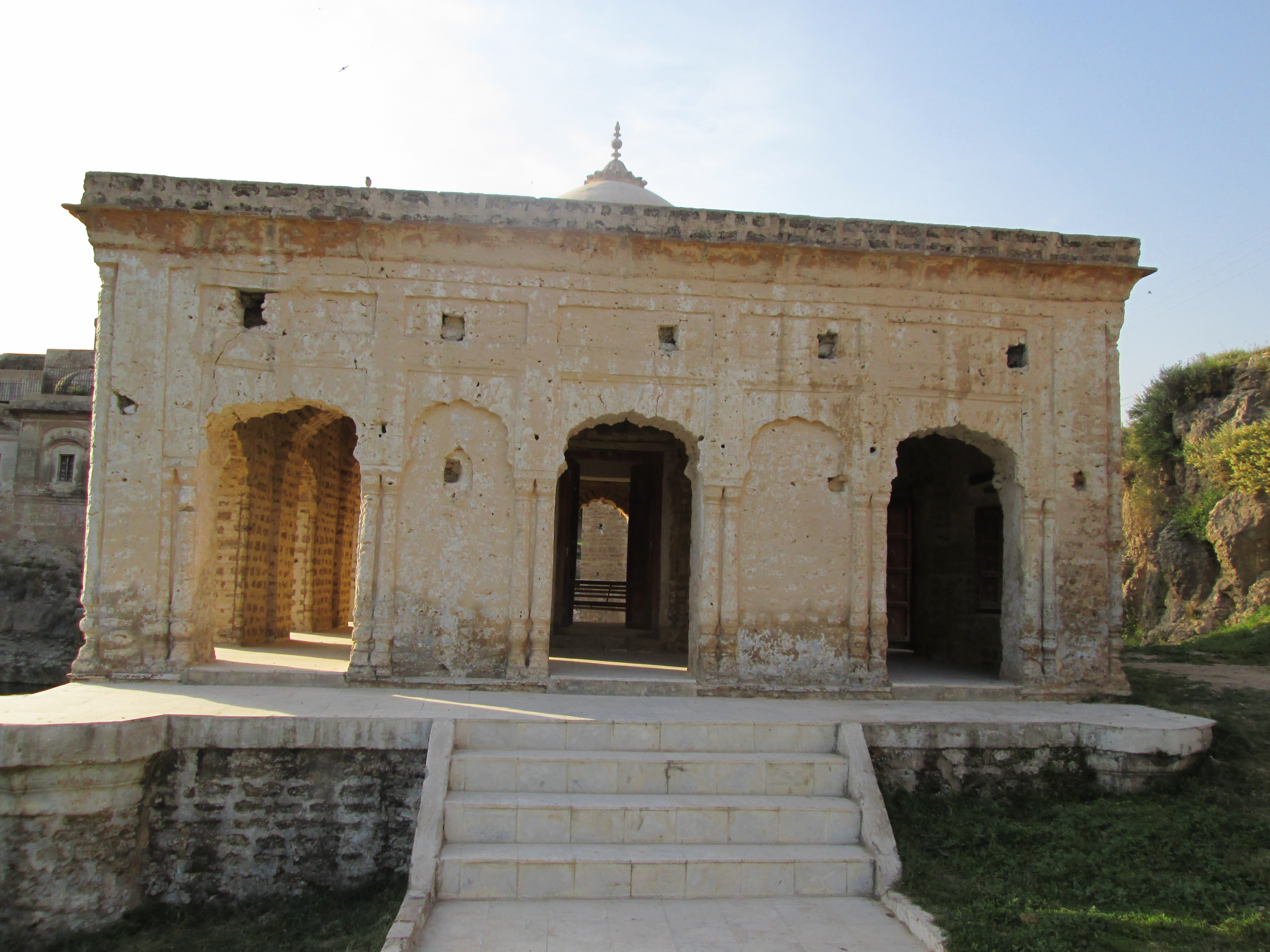
Baradari at Katasraj Mandir, Choa Saidanshah, Chakwal, Punjab, Pakistan

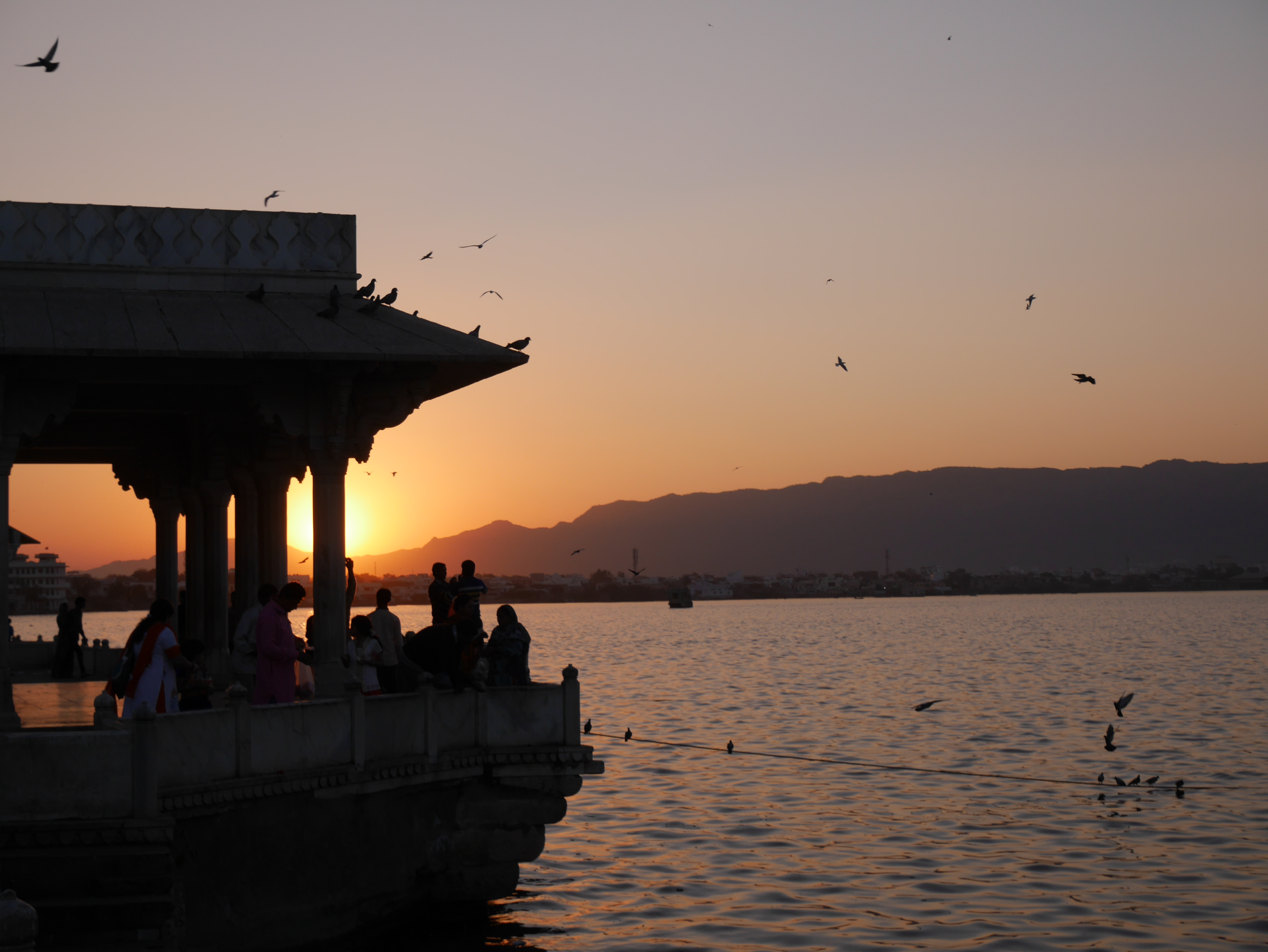
Baradari at Ana Sagar, Ajmer.
