= Wazir Khan Baradari =

Pavilion in Lahore, Pakistan

- وزیر خان بارہ دری
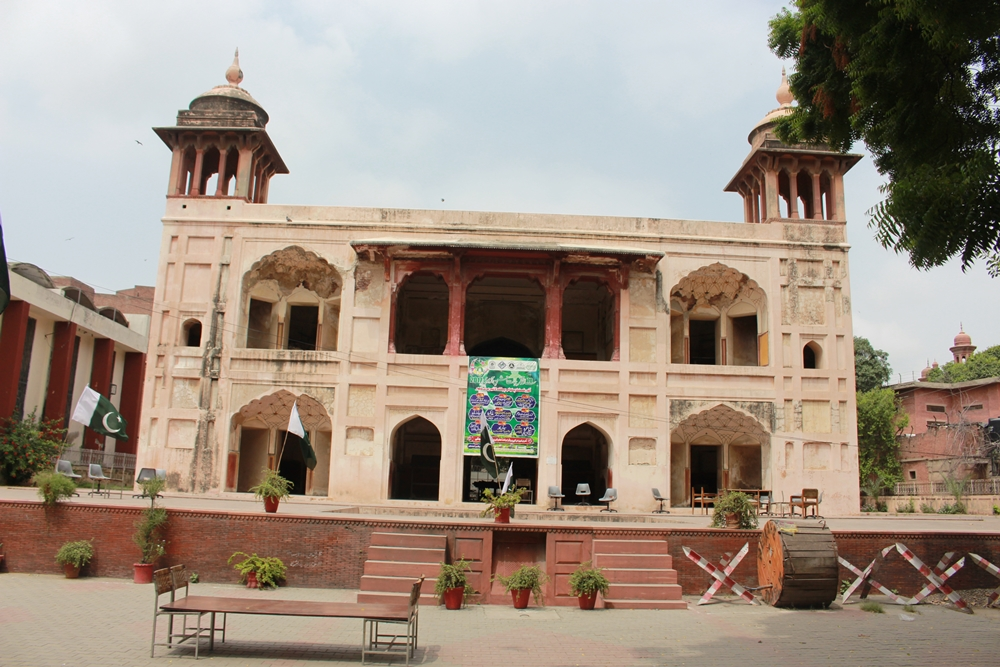
- Interactive map of Wazir Khan Baradari
- Location: Lahore, Punjab, Pakistan
- Coordinates: 31.567725123°N 74.307785471°E
- Type: Baradari
- Completion date: 1634–1635; 391 years ago

The Wazir Khan Baradari (Urdu: وزیر خان بارہ دری) is a two-storey baradari located between National College of Arts and Tollinton Market in Anarkali, Lahore, Pakistan. It was built by Wazir Khan, the governor of Punjab during the reign of Shah Jahan, as a summer pavilion in his Nakhlia Garden in 1635. Today it serves as the reading room of Punjab Public Library.

The garden in which it once stood, known as Nakhlia due to abundance of date palms, has since disappeared as has its high dome. During the Sikh period it was used as cantonment for Sikh soldiers and sustained much damage. After Punjab was annexed by the British it served as the Settlement Office and later as the first Telegraph Office in Lahore. Before the construction of present building of Lahore Museum it also hosted a museum. In 1885 the Punjab Public Library was inaugurated and the baradari has since acted as its reading room.

The baradari consists of 12 arched openings. It consists of a central hall surrounded by galleries. Each of its four corners has a square chhatri.

It is a federally protected historical site under The Antiquity Act 1975. In 2024 the Walled City of Lahore Authority (WCLA) started conservation work on the baradari with an estimated cost of 166.8 million rupees which is expected to complete by June 2026. It will also include revival of literary activities at the baradari and restoration of its frescoes.

== Images ==
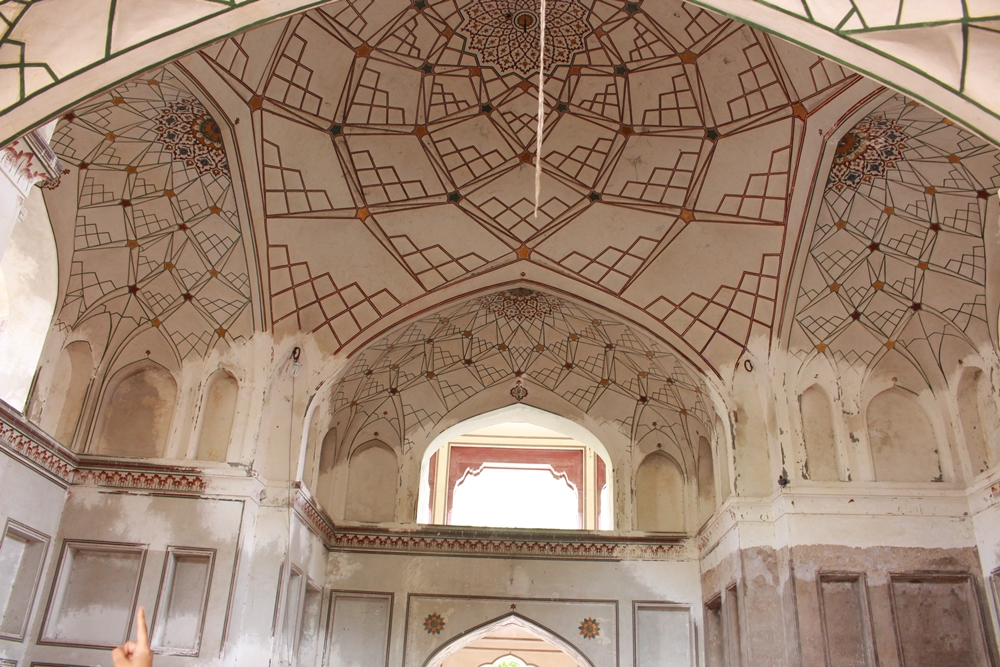
The Frescco art inside Baradari Wazir Khan Lahore

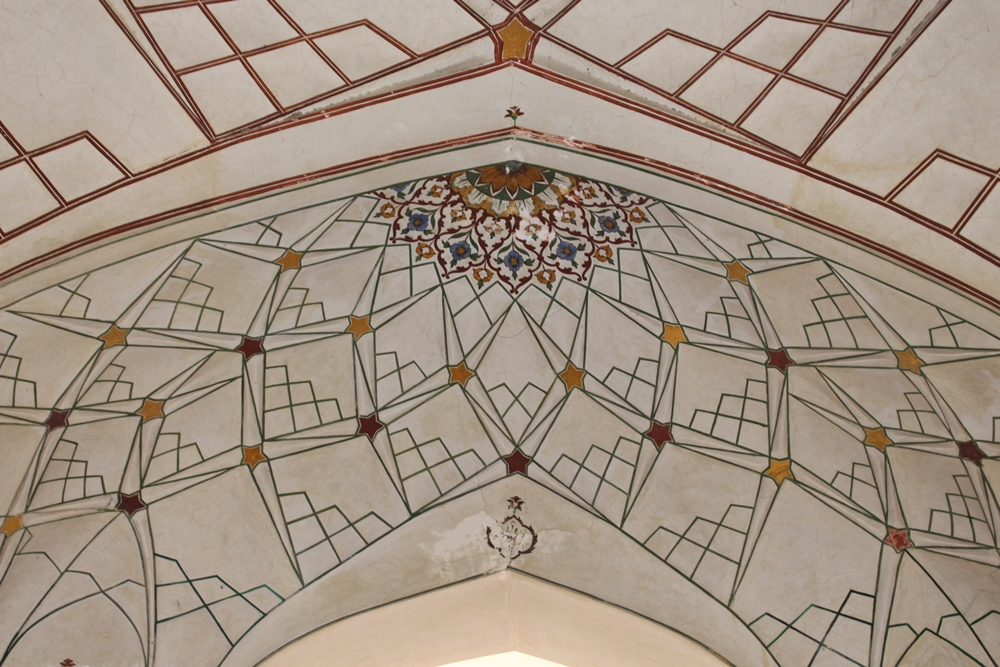
Fressco art inside Baradari Wazir Khan Lahore

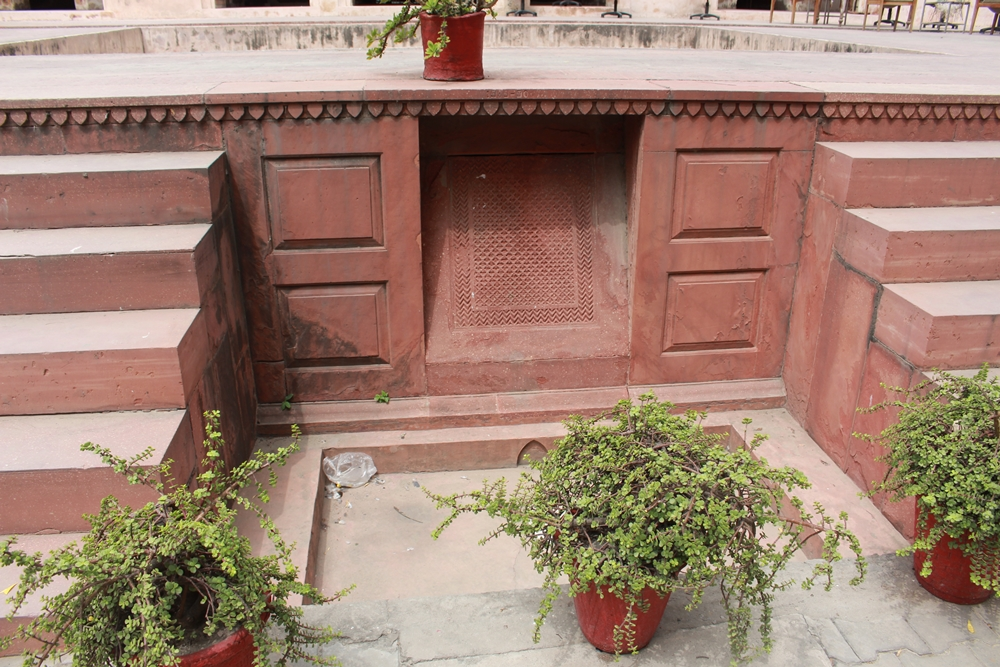
Water fall outside Baradari Wazir Khan Lahore

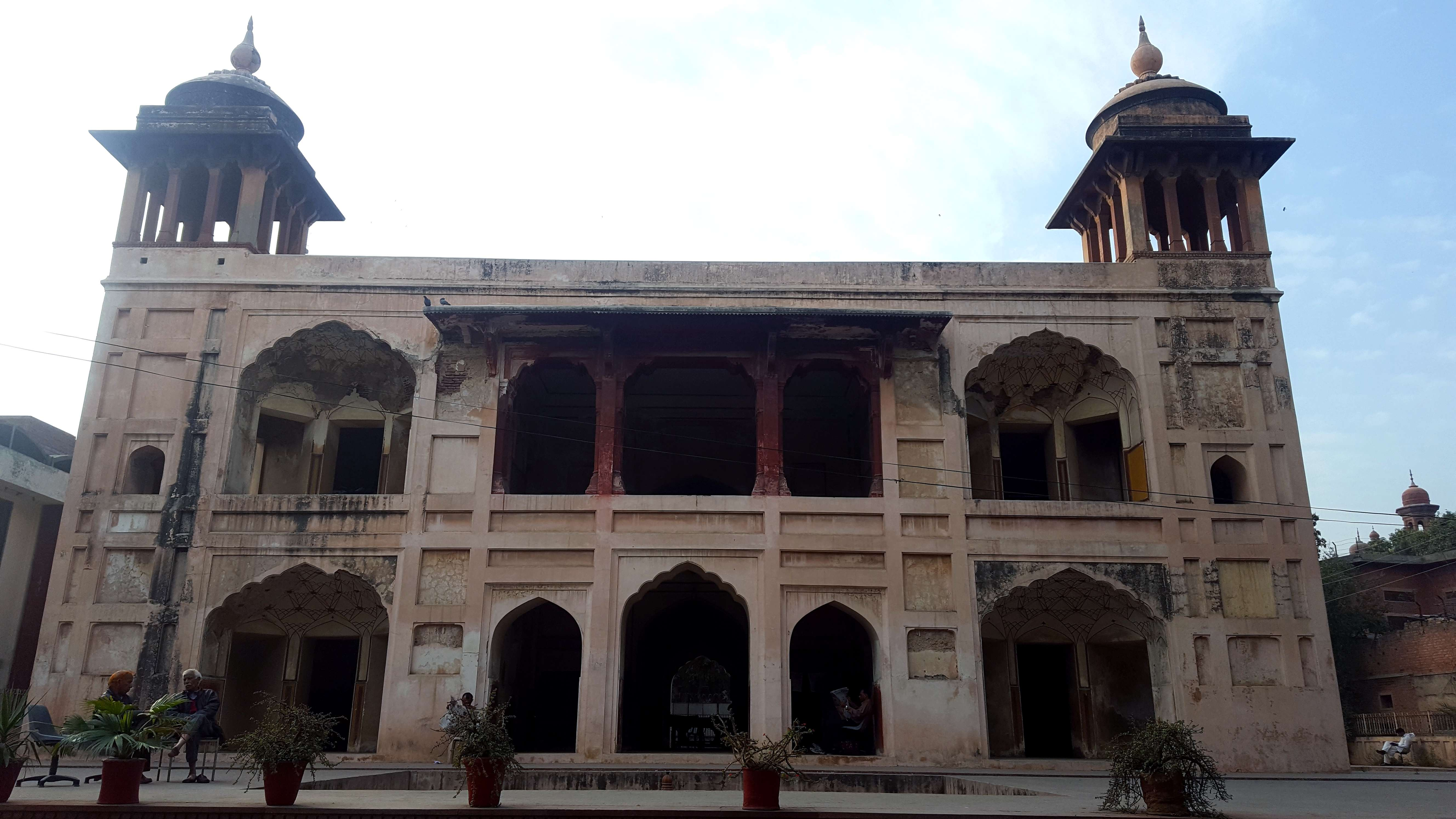
Wazir Khan's Baradari
