= Mukhtar Masood =

Pakistani writer and diplomat

Mukhtar Masood مختار مسعود
- Born: 15 December 1926; Sialkot, British India (now in Pakistan)
- Died: 15 April 2017 (aged 90); Lahore, Pakistan
- Occupations: Writer; Civil servant Bureaucrat
- Parent: Shaikh Ataullah (father)
- Writing career
- Notable work: Awaz e Dost
- Notable awards: Sitara-i-Imtiaz

Mukhtar Masood (15 December 1926 – 15 April 2017) was a Pakistani Urdu writer and bureaucrat.

== Early life and career ==
Born in Sialkot, Punjab, British India on 15 December 1926, to Shaikh Ataullah (1896 - 1968), a well-known literary scholar and professor of economics at the Aligarh Muslim University originally from Jalalpur Jattan in the Gujrat district of Punjab, Masood was a graduate of the Aligarh Muslim University as well in 1948. He migrated to Pakistan in 1948 after the partition of India. In 1949, he passed the Central Superior Services (CSS) examination and went on to serve at different important positions such as commissioner and federal secretary.

During his career, he served as chairman of both the Pakistan Industrial Development Corporation (PIDC), and the Agricultural Development Bank of Pakistan and secretary-general of the Regional Cooperation for Development (RCD).

He wrote four books – Awaz-e-Dost, Safer Naseeb, Loh-e-Ayyam, and Harf-e-Shouq – all of which are highly regarded in literary circles of Pakistan. His last book, Harf-e-Shouq, was published in July 2017.

He played an important role in the construction of the Minar-e-Pakistan historic monument in Lahore, Pakistan. He was serving as Lahore's deputy commissioner at that time and took keen interest in the execution of the construction project. This historic national monument was constructed in the 1960s during the Ayub Khan's regime. His contribution in construction of Mangla and Tarbela Dams of Pakistan is also vital. He established a state-of-the-art school and college at Chowki Village of Azad Jammu & Kashmir, Pakistan and also donated all his personal books and library to the said school. He was a real patriot and a true Pakistani.

== Awards and recognition ==
- To honor his contributions to Pakistani literature, he was awarded Sitara-i-Imtiaz (Star of Excellence) Award by the President of Pakistan in 2004.
- 'Aalmi Frogh-e-Urdu Adab' (World Promotion of Urdu Literature) Award in 2010.

== Death ==
He died in Lahore, Pakistan on 15 April 2017. Among the survivors are two sons and a daughter.

== Bibliography ==
=== Books by him ===
- Eye witnesses of history; a collection of letters addressed to Quaid-i-Azam, 1968. Edited by Mukhtar Masood.
- Āvāz-i dost, 1973. An account of the Pakistan Movement.
- Safar naṣīb, 1981. Reminiscences of a Pakistani civil service officer; include travel impressions of different parts of the world.
- Lauḥ-i ayyām, 1996. On the Islamic revolution of Iran, 1979, written by a civil servant who had been there for four years during the revolution.
- Ḥarf-i shauq, 2018. Autobiographical reminiscences of an Urdu author and ex-civil servant of Pakistan, with special reference to his college life at Aligarh Muslim University, include one chapter on Sir Sayyid Aḥmad K̲h̲ān̲ (1817–1898).

=== Books about him ===
- Muk̲h̲tār Masʻūd kā uslūb, 2013, by Alt̤āf Yūsufzaʼī. Critical study of his works.
