= Kashi Kari =

Pakistani craft

Kashi Kari, also known as Kashigari or Kashee, is a craft of glazing and ornamenting fired-clay tiles for architectural decoration.

== Etymology ==
The Persian noun kāshi ("tile") is widely believed to derive from the city of Kashan, a medieval centre of ceramic production; kāri means "work" or "craft", so kāshi kāri denotes "tile-work". In Sindhi and Punjabi usage, the term extends to under-glaze painted pottery as well as to faience mosaics, and the craftsmen are called kashigars.

== History ==
Persian potters were recorded at Multan by the early 13th century, and the mausoleum of the Sufi saint Bahauddin Zakariya (built c. 1262) is often cited as the subcontinent's earliest glazed-tile monument. The craft flourished under the Mughal emperors: in Lahore the Wazir Khan Mosque (1634–41) exhibits the most extensive faience revetment of any Mughal building, while its adjoining Shahi Hammam retains cuerda seca soffits. In Sindh, Emperor Shah Jahan commissioned the red-brick and blue-tile Shah Jahan Mosque at Thatta (1644–59), whose 93 domes and 33 arches were clad with tiles fired in Hala.
