= Shahi Hammam =

Shahi Hammam شاہی حمام
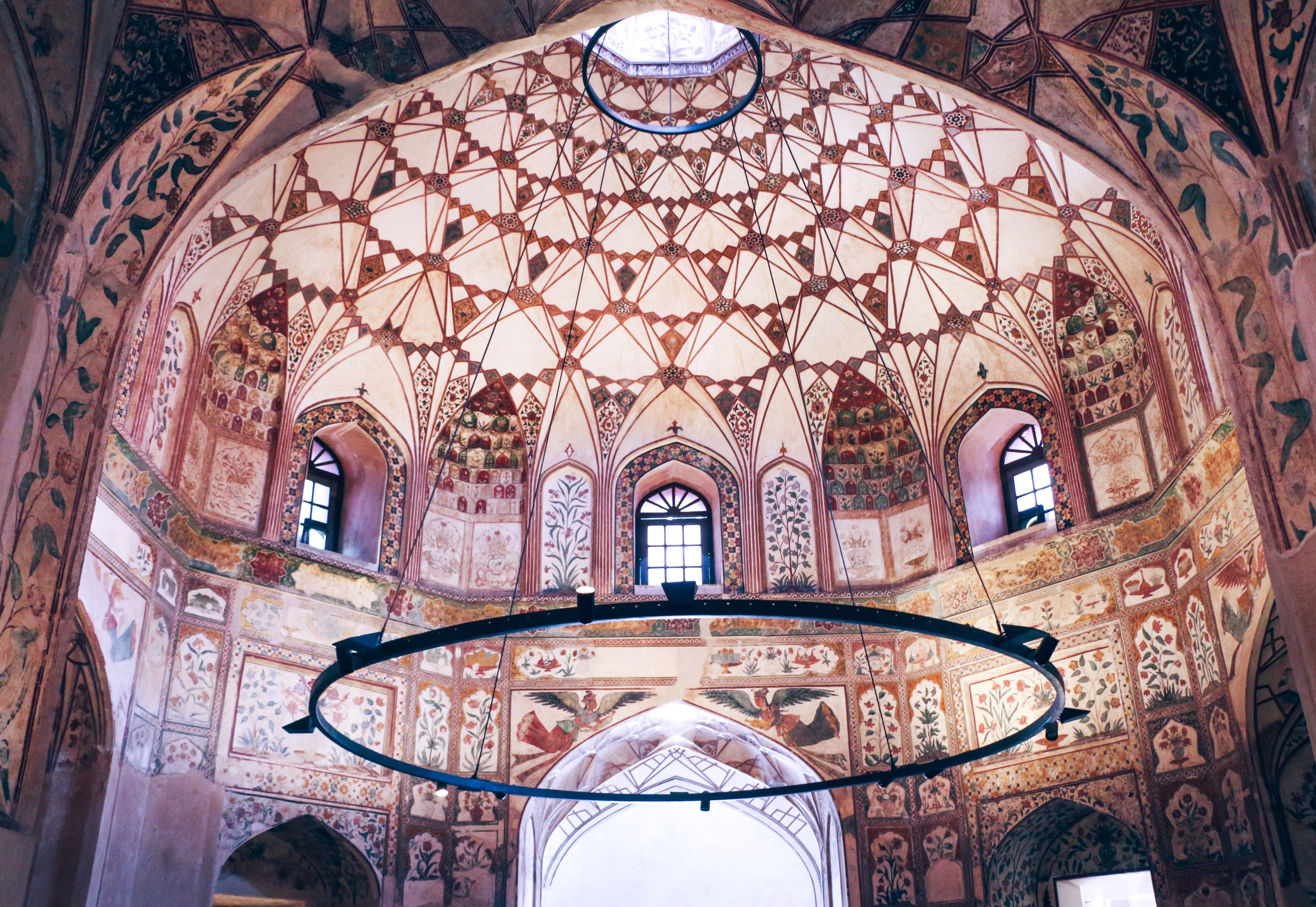
- The central chamber of the Shahi Hammam
- Interactive map of the Shahi Hammam شاہی حمام area

General information
- Location: Lahore, Punjab Pakistan, Delhi Gate
- Coordinates: 31.582096°N 74.325974°E
- Opened: 1635; 391 years ago
- Renovated: 2015
- Operator: Walled City of Lahore Authority

Other information
- Facilities: Formerly steam bath, hot room, cold room

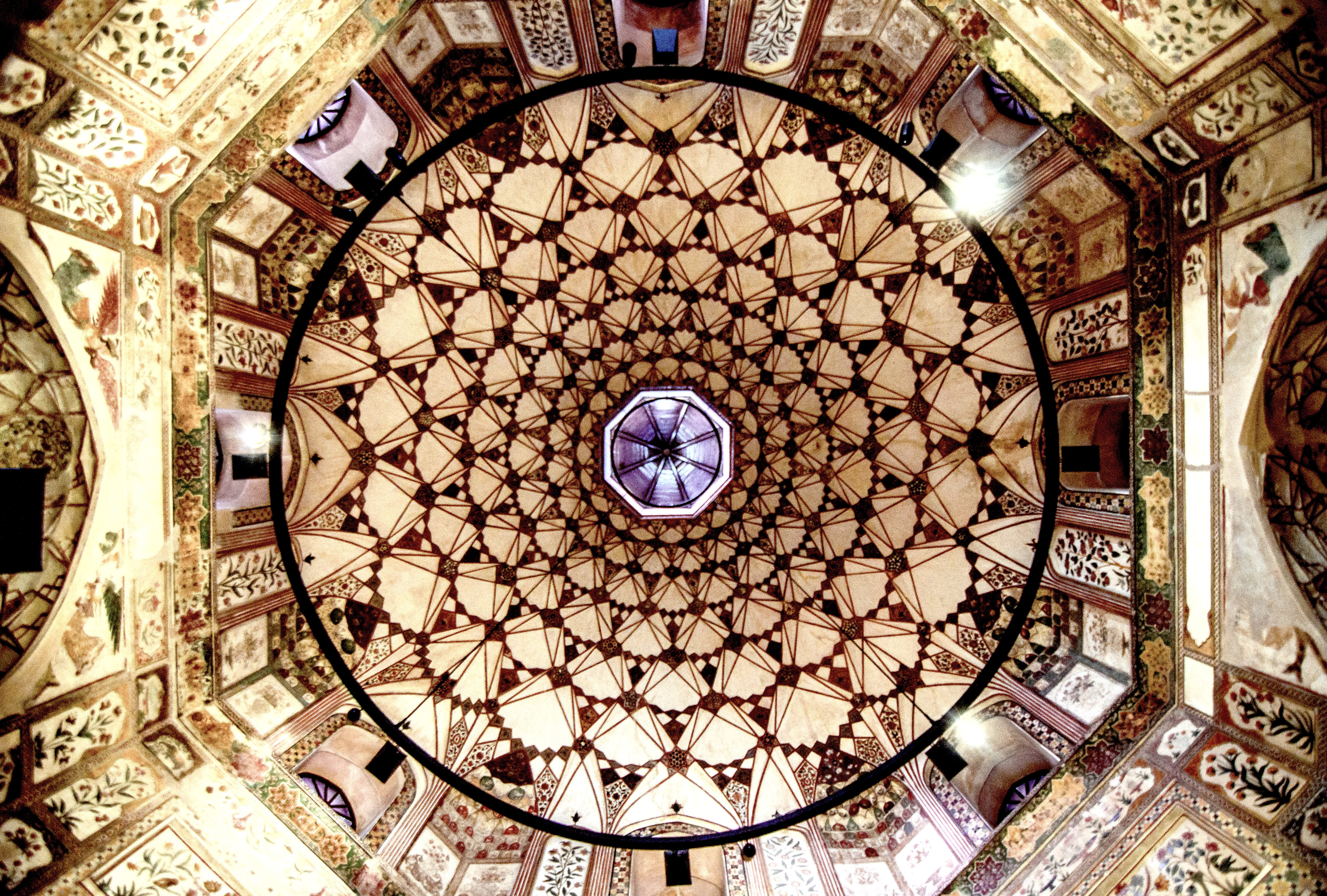
Frescoes under the main dome have been preserved and restored.

The Shahi Hammam (Punjabi: شاہی حمام, romanized: Shā(h)ī (H)a'mām; Urdu: شاہی حمام, romanized: Shāhī Hamām; lit. 'Royal Baths'), also known as the Wazir Khan Hammam, is a hammam which was built in Lahore, Punjab, Pakistan, in 1635 C.E. during the reign of Emperor Shah Jahan. It was built by chief physician to the Mughal Court, Ilam-ud-din Ansari, who was widely known as Wazir Khan. The baths were built to serve as a waqf, or endowment, for the maintenance of the Wazir Khan Mosque.

No longer used as a hammam, the baths were restored between 2013 and 2015 by the Aga Khan Trust for Culture and the Walled City of Lahore Authority, with much of the funding provided by the government of Norway. The restoration project was given an Award of Merit by UNESCO in 2016 for the hammam's successful conservation which returned it to its "former prominence."

== Location ==
The Shahi Hammam is located just within the Walled City of Lahore, steps away from the Delhi Gate. The Shahi Hammam is the last remaining Mughal-era hammam in Lahore.

== Background ==
During the Mughal era, Persian-style hammams were introduced although they never achieved the same levels of popularity in the Mughal Empire as they did in Persia.

== History ==
The Shahi Hammam was built in 1635 by Ilam-ud-din Ansari, Governor of Lahore, as part of an endowment which included the Wazir Khan Mosque. The baths fell into disuse by the 18th century during the decline and fall of the Mughal Empire. From the early British period onwards, the building was used for different purposes - as a primary school, dispensary, and recreational centre as well as an office for the local municipality. Additionally, shops were built into the building’s northern, western and southern façades.

Excavations as part of restoration works completed in 2015 revealed that substantial parts of the building had previously been demolished, likely to make way for the reconstruction of Delhi Gate in the 1860s.

== Layout ==
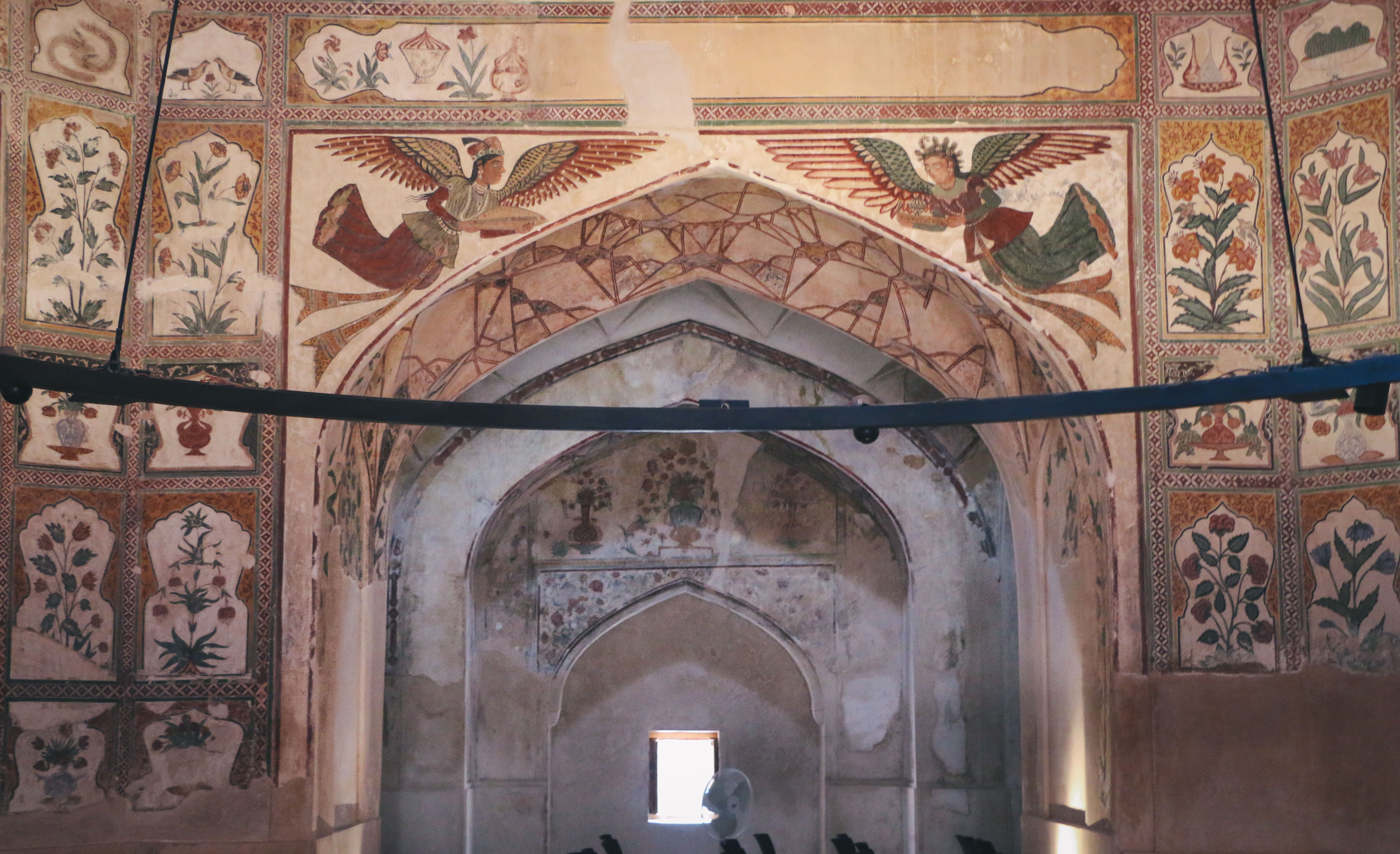
Some walls were adorned with Mughal-era frescoes which still remain intact.

The hammam consisted of three parts: the jama khana (dressing area), nim garm (warm baths), and garm (hot baths). The baths were gender segregated, and contained a reception chamber as well as a small prayer room.

=== Architecture ===
In keeping with Persian tradition, the baths were illuminated by sunlight which filtered through several openings in the bath's ceiling which also aided ventilation. Most of the hammam's interior was preserved intact, and several Mughal era frescoes have been preserved. As the façade had few windows, merchant shops were permitted to operate along the hammam's outer walls.

== Conservation ==
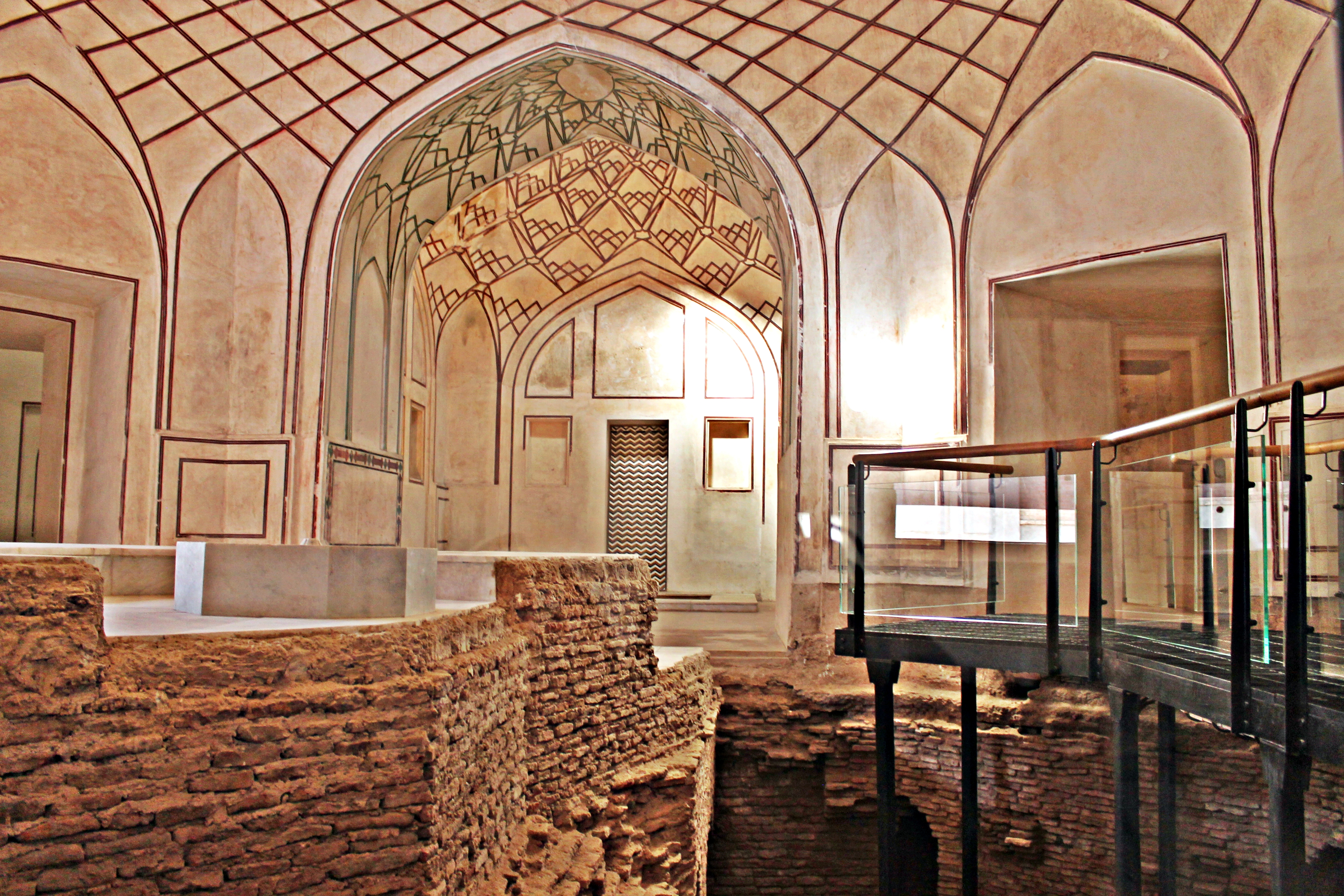
The hammam was recently renovated.

The Aga Khan Trust for Culture (AKTC), with funding from the government of Norway, began restoration works at the baths to conserve the space, restore the original layout of the building, and to uncover and preserve Mughal-era frescoes which decorated the building's walls. Works were completed in 2015, and are the improvements are said to have changed the surroundings "dramatically."

In 2016, UNESCO awarded the Shahi Hamam restoration project an Award of Merit for its "high degree of technical proficiency" and "for returning the ornate Shahi Hammam to its former prominence."

Excavations have unearthed a water heating structure, drainage systems, and under-floor remains of its hypocausts.

== Gallery ==
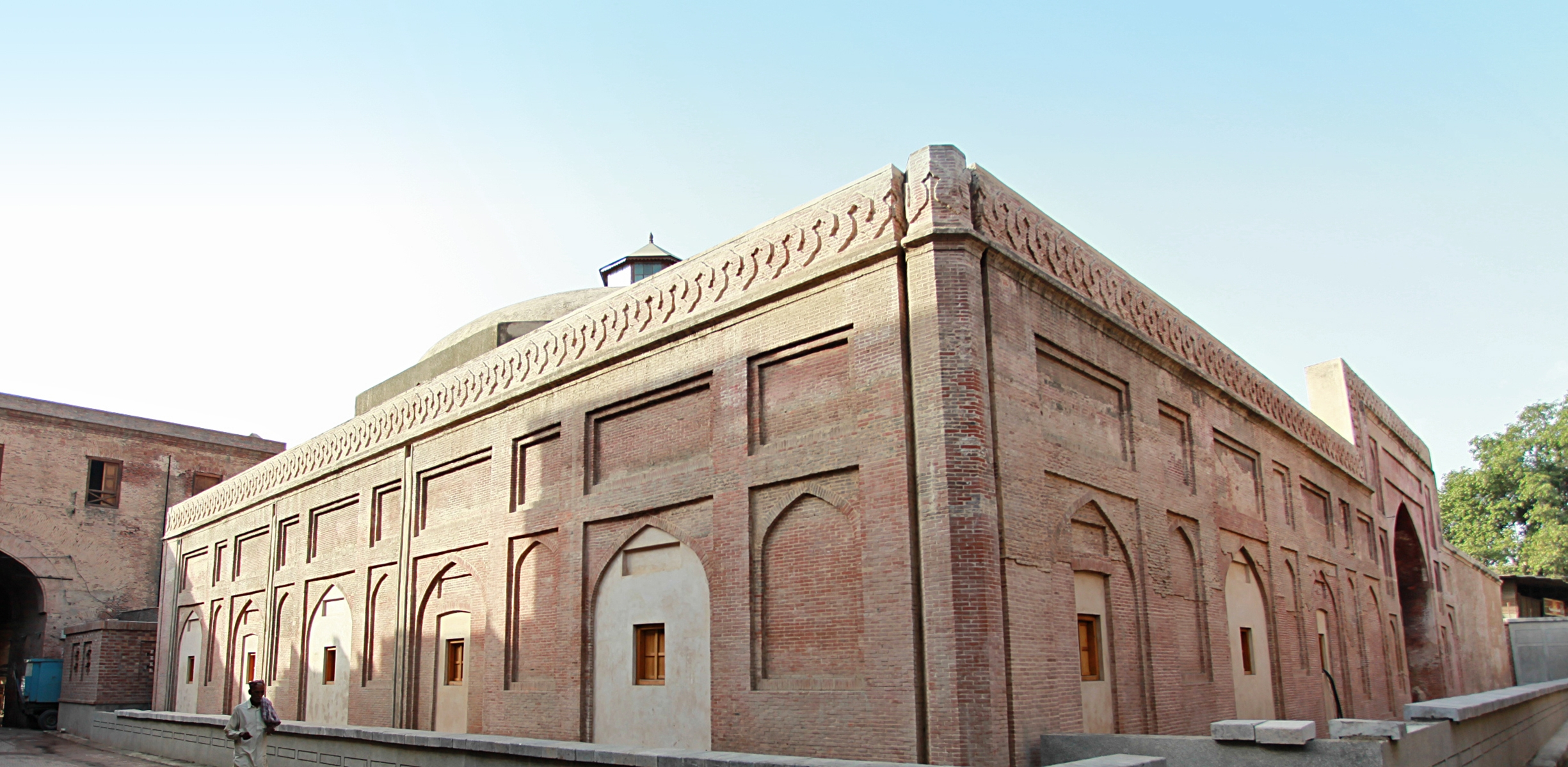
The baths' exterior has been restored

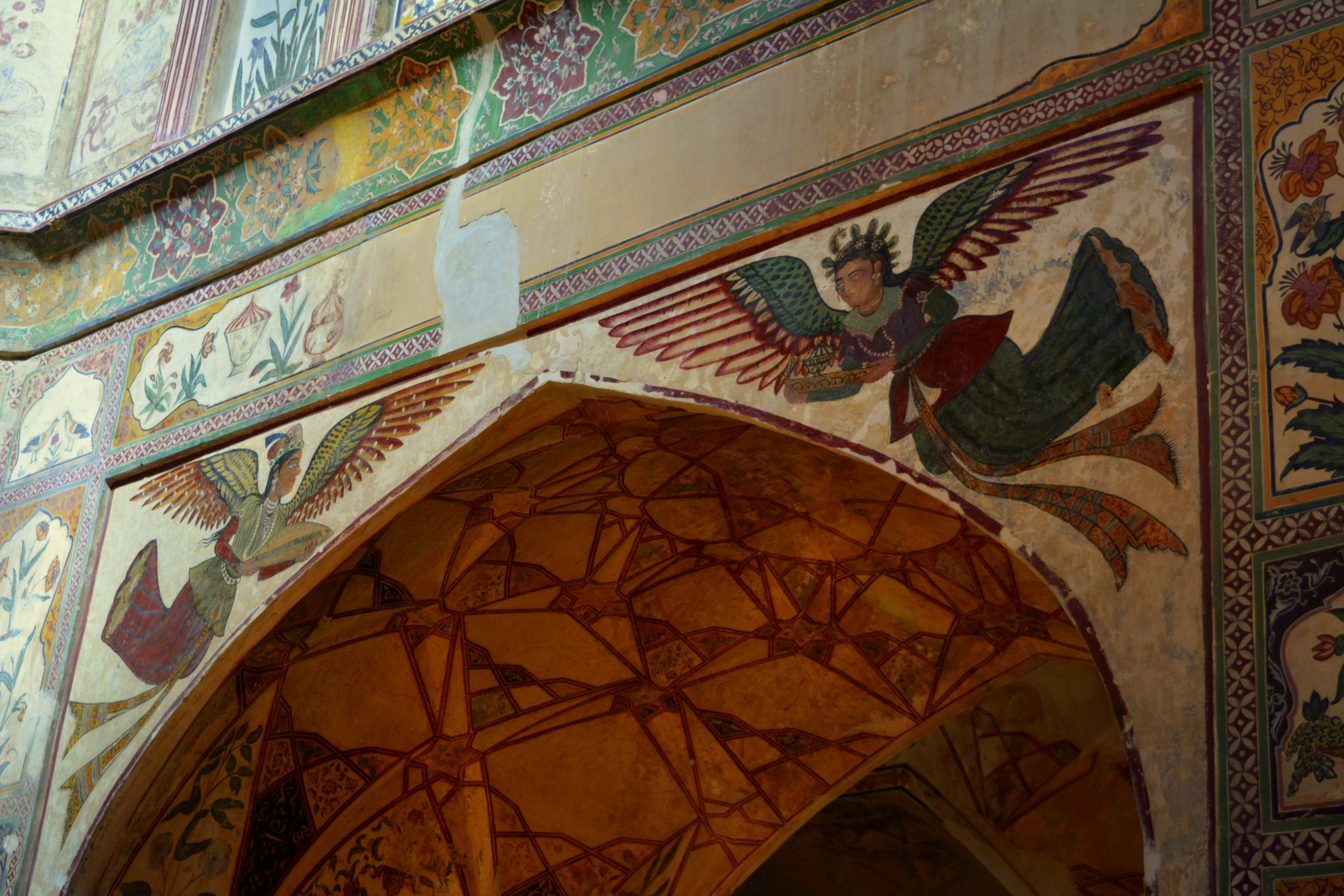
The baths feature frescoes depicting winged angels

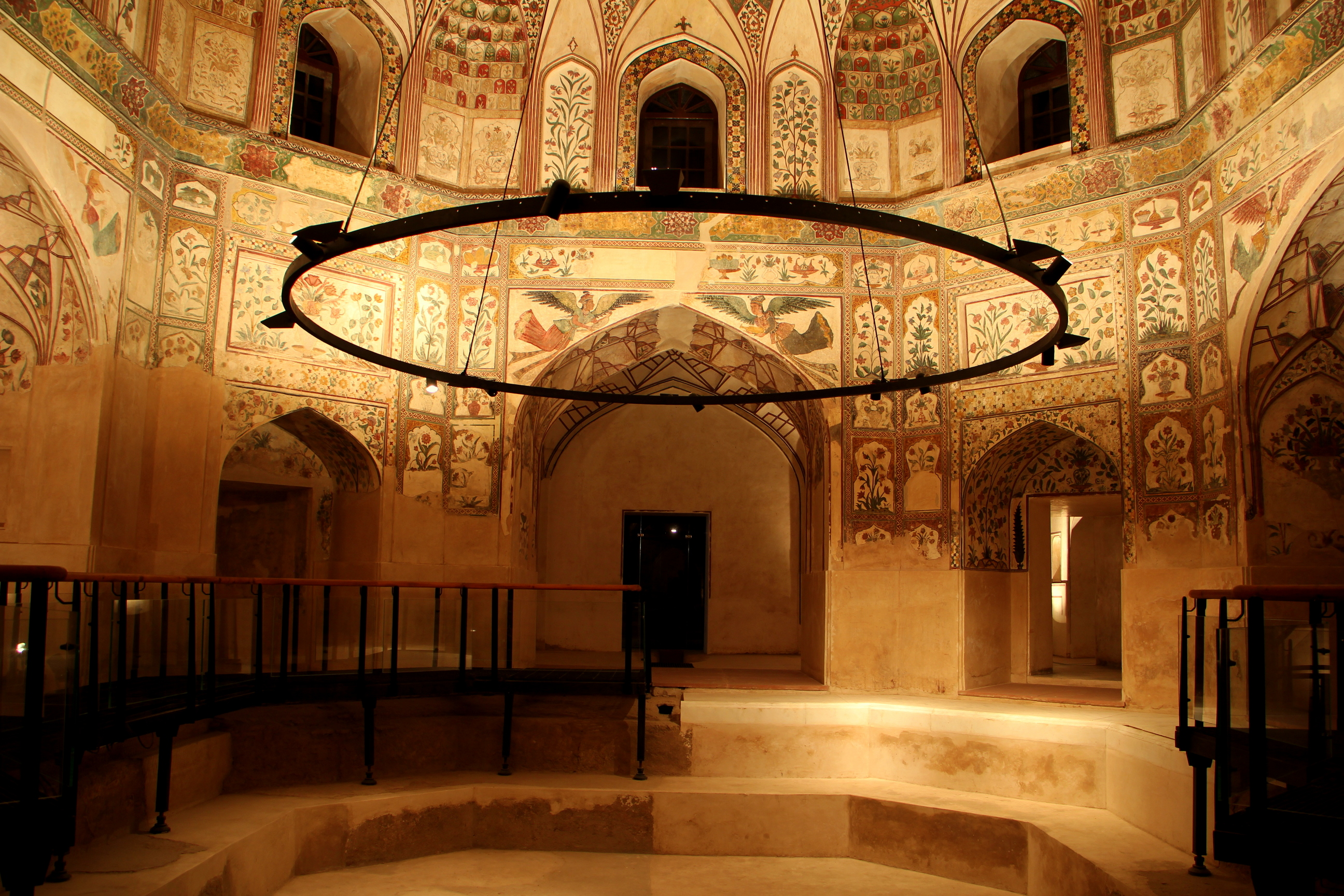
The baths' cold chamber is elaborately decorated with frescoes

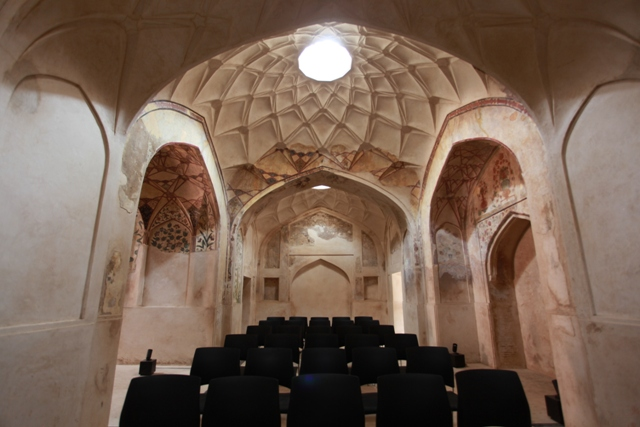
Side chambers are used as an auditorium

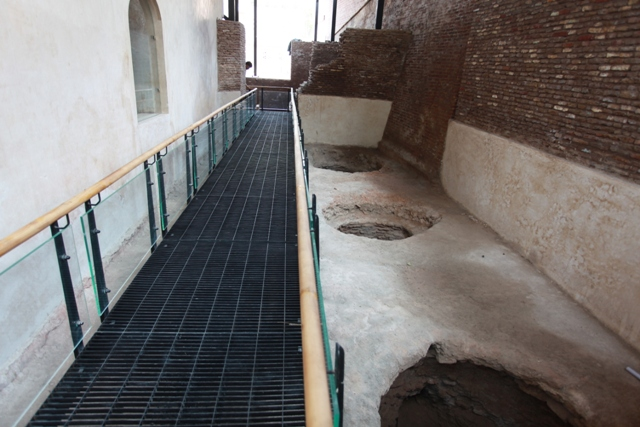
Elevated walkways have been constructed to avoid damage to the restored site

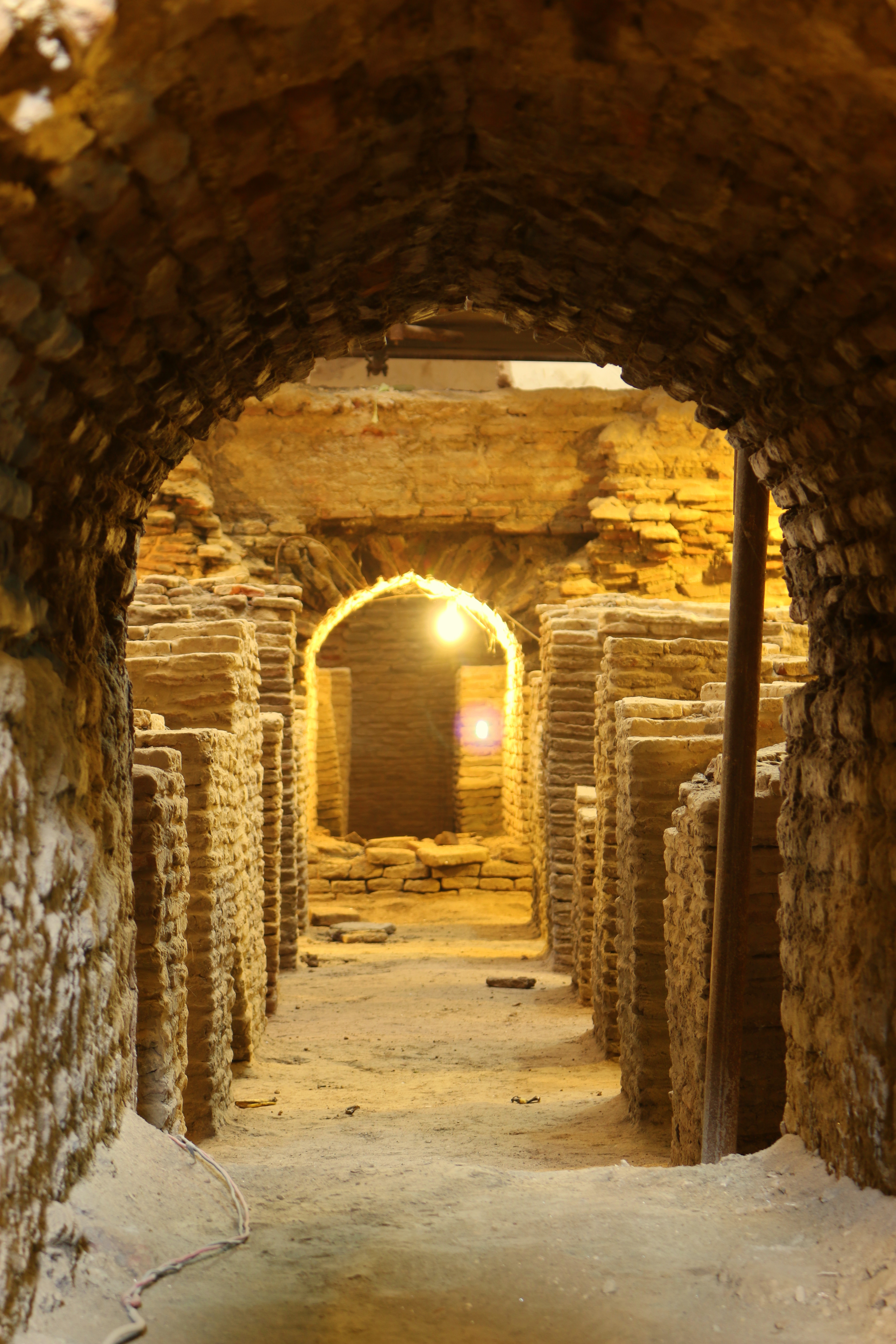
The bath's lower levels have been exposed

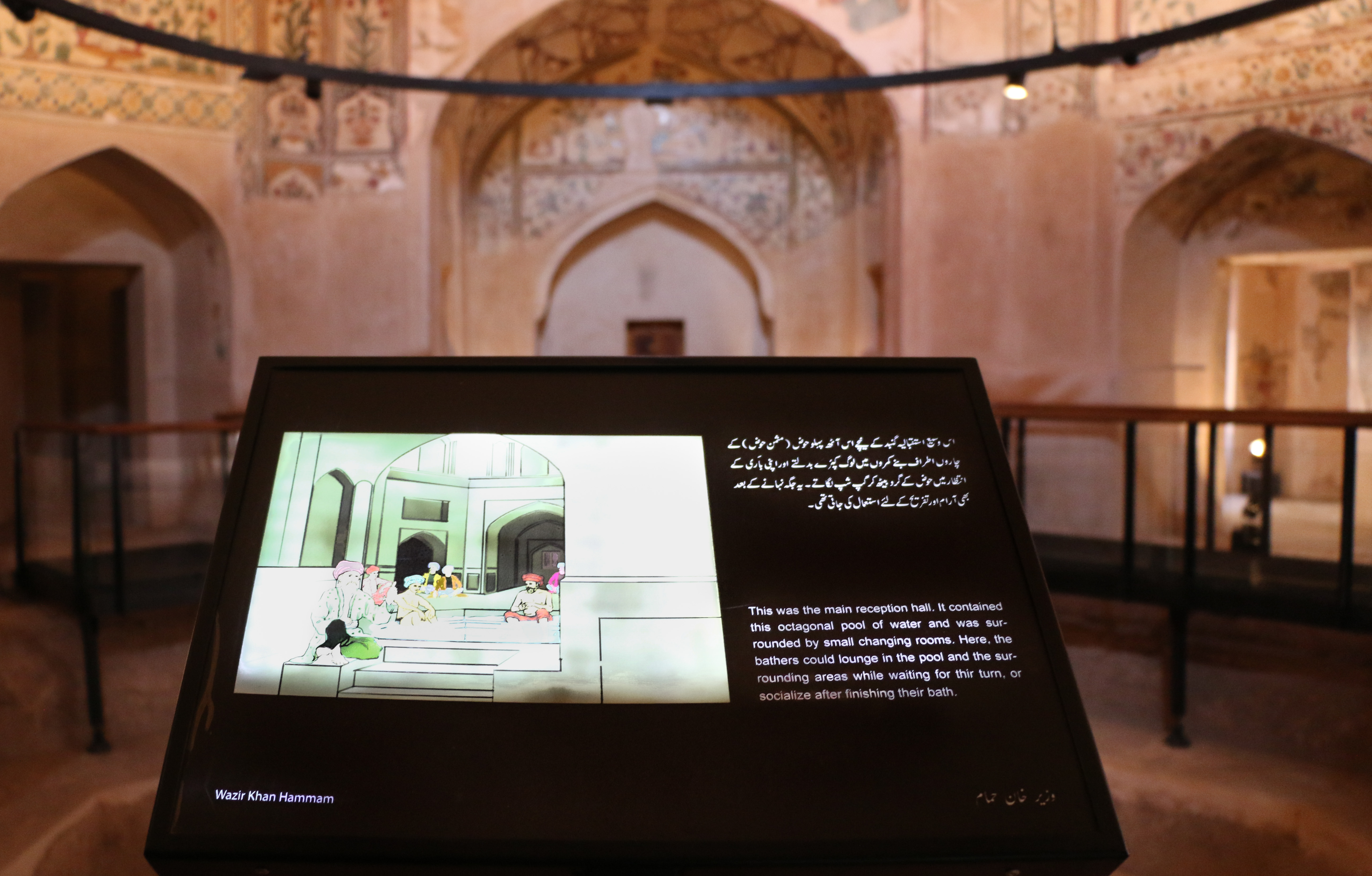
The baths feature new informational displays

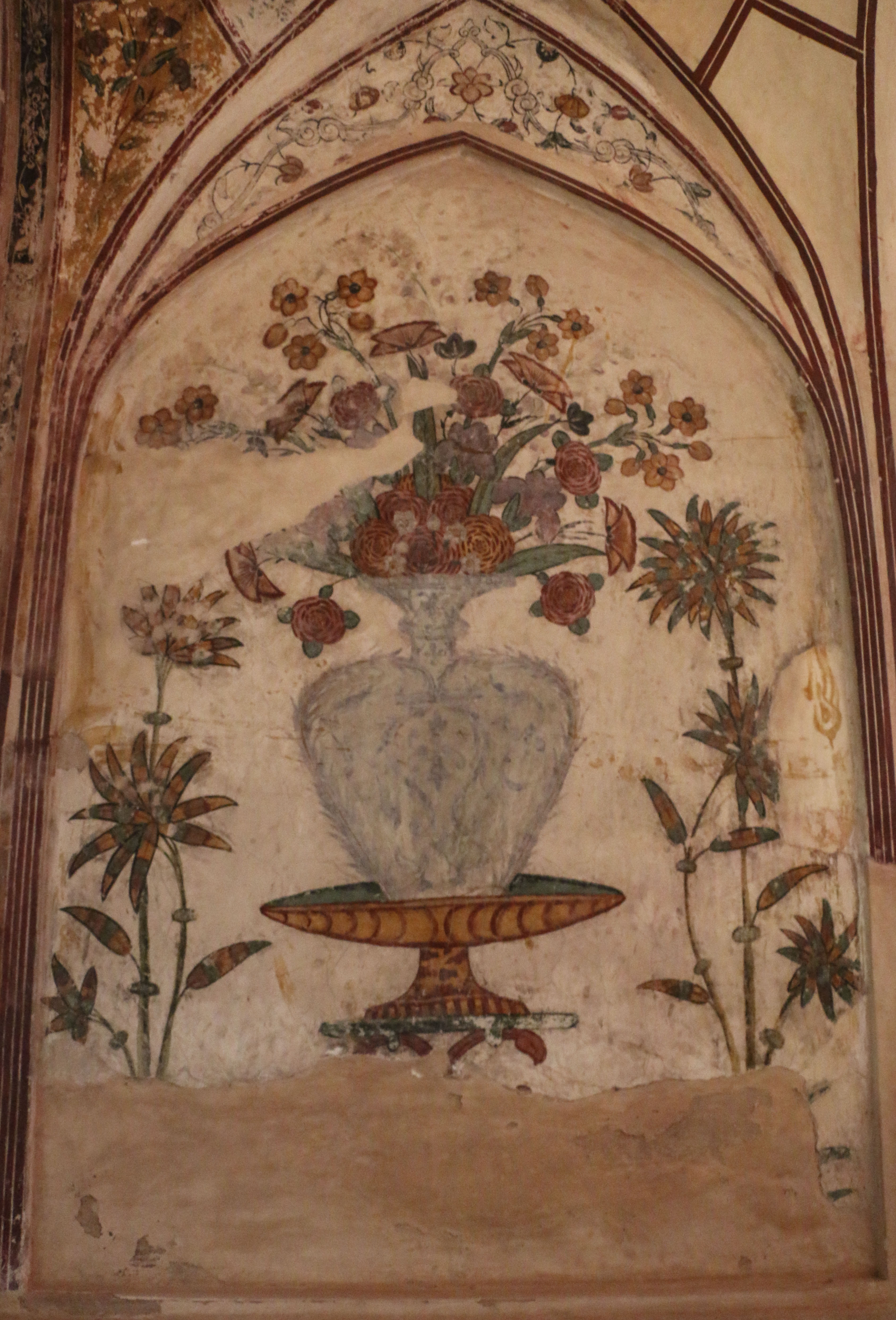
Examples of the baths' frescoes

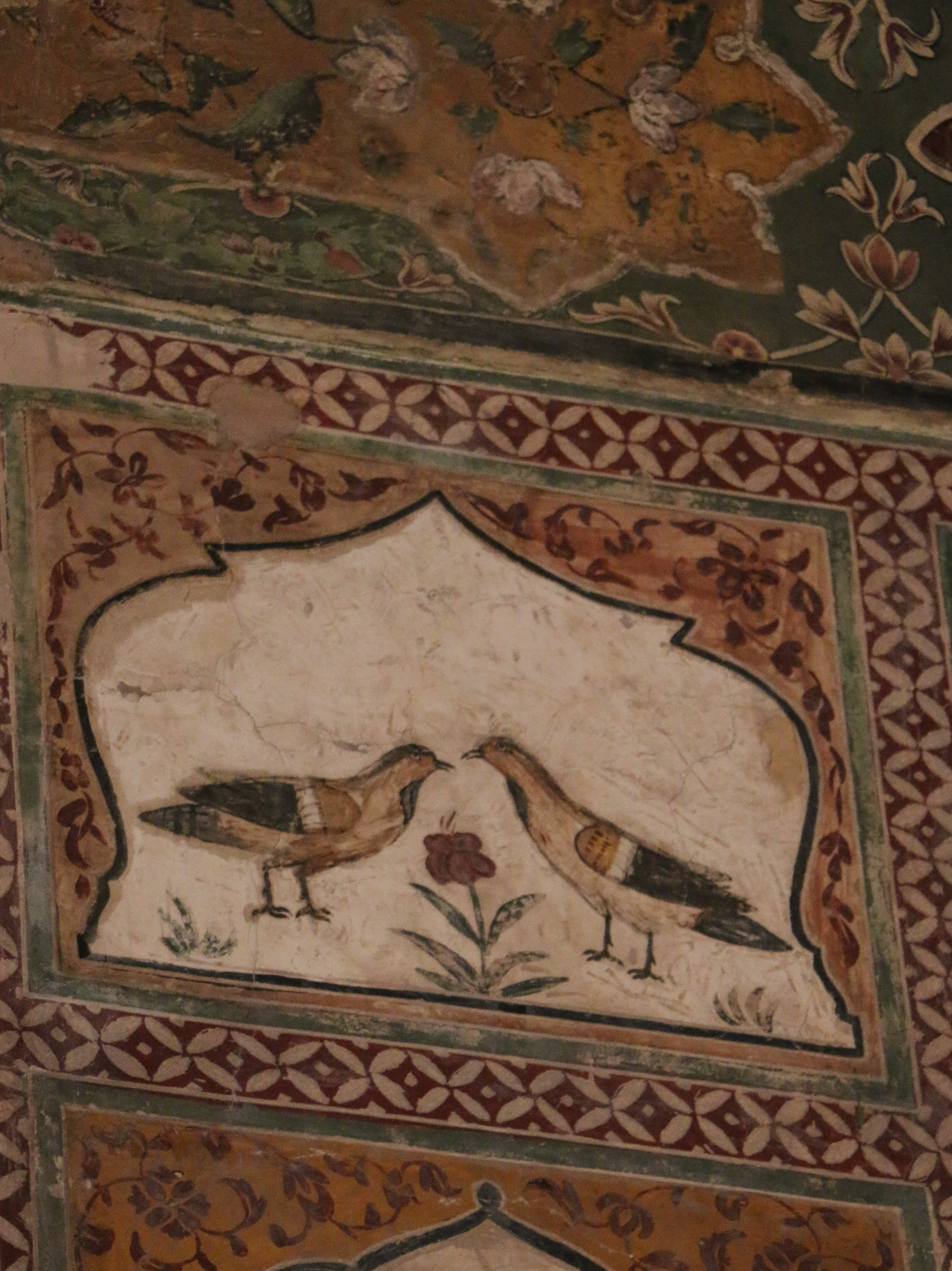
Examples of the baths' frescoes

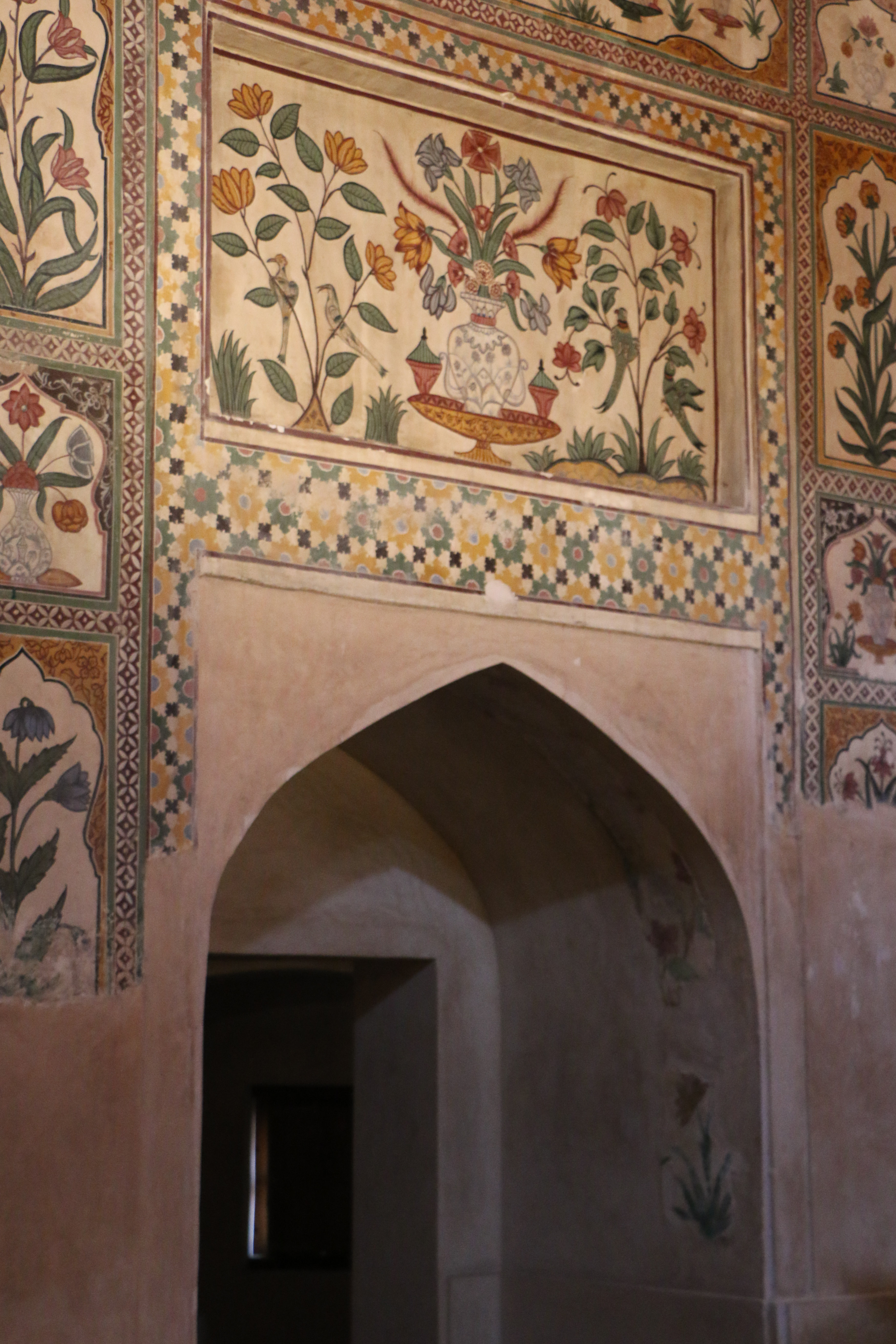
Examples of the baths' frescoes

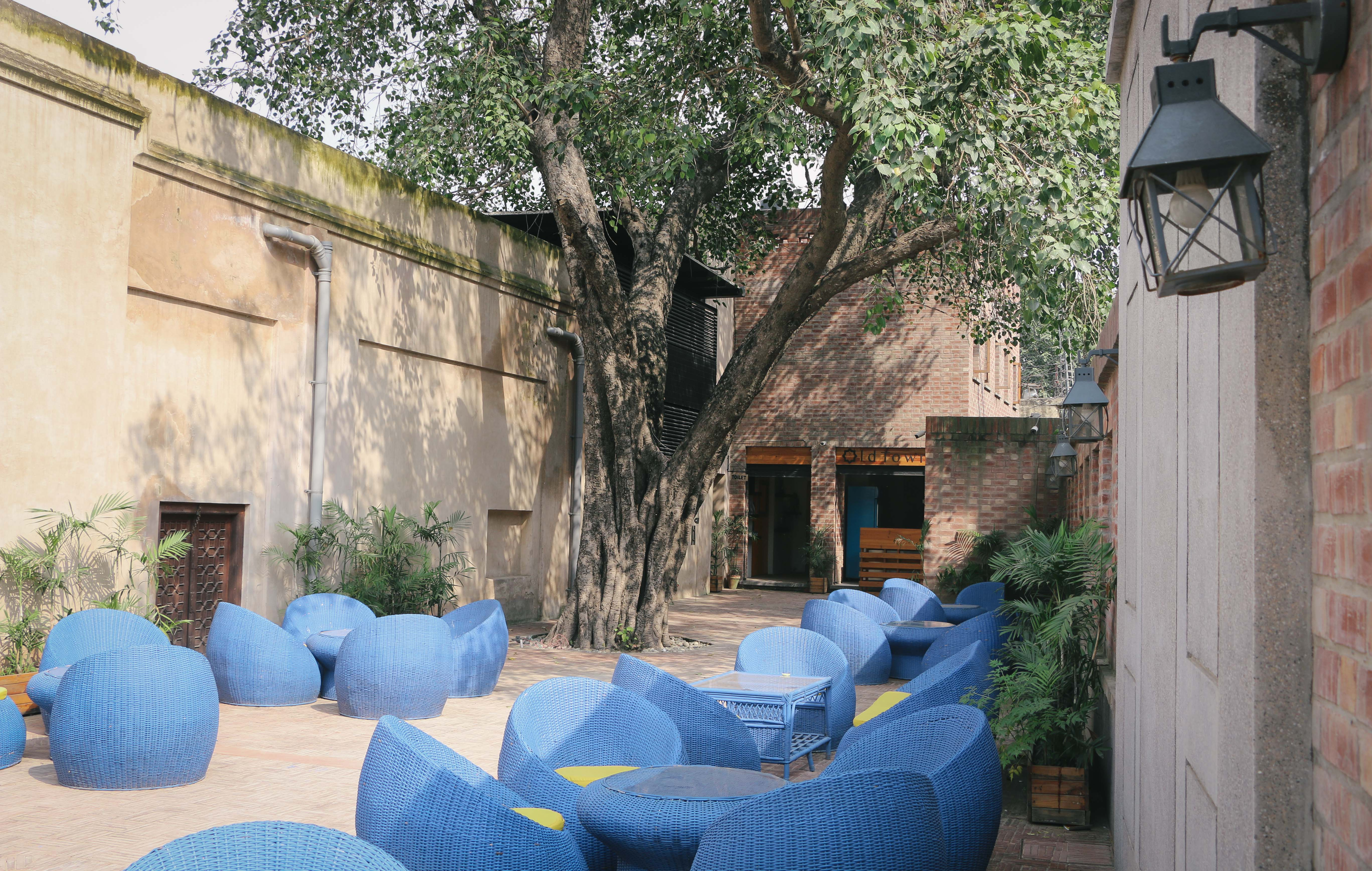
The baths feature a cafe

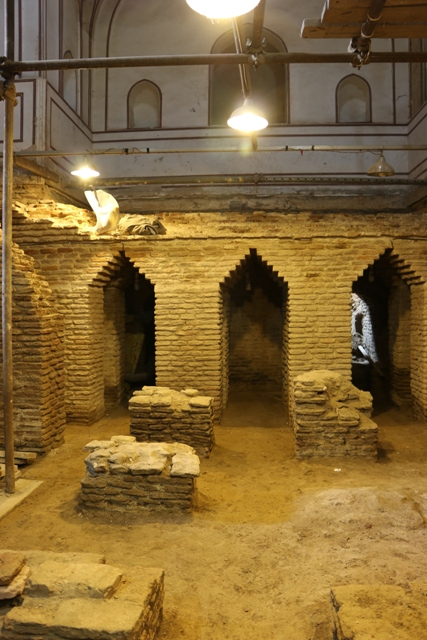
Hypocausts

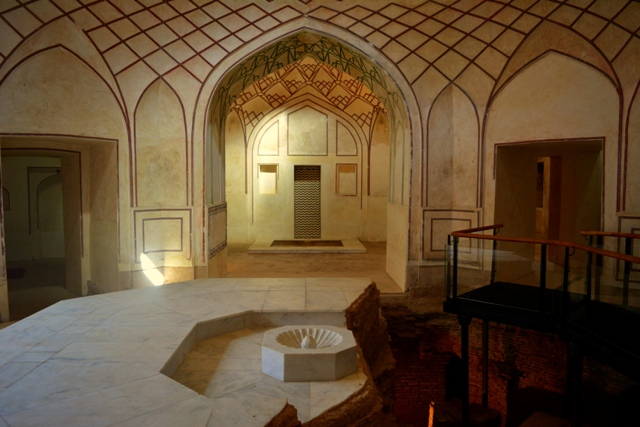
The steam bath features more reserved embellishments

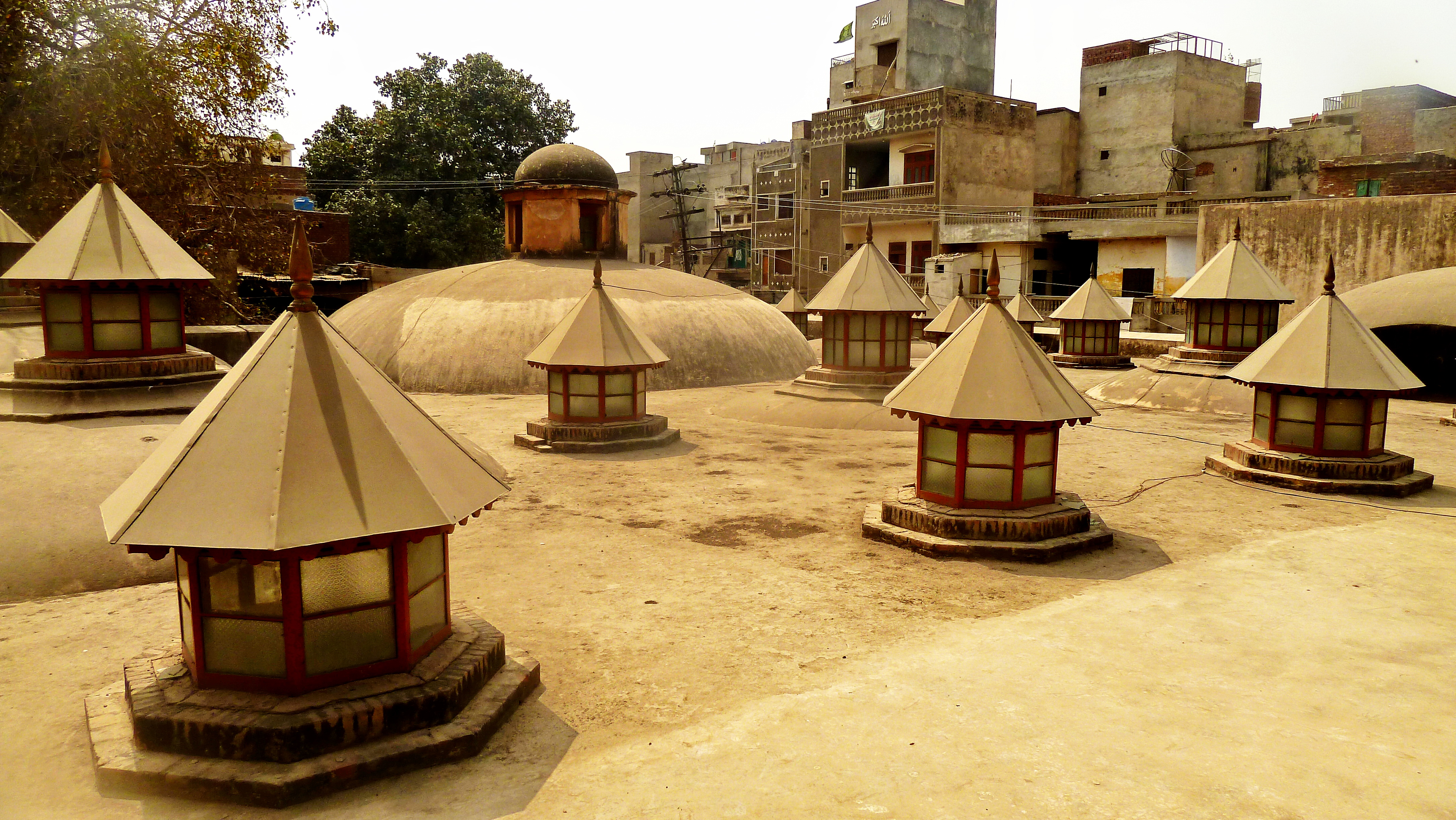
Dome and exhaust vents in the roof of the Shahi Hammam

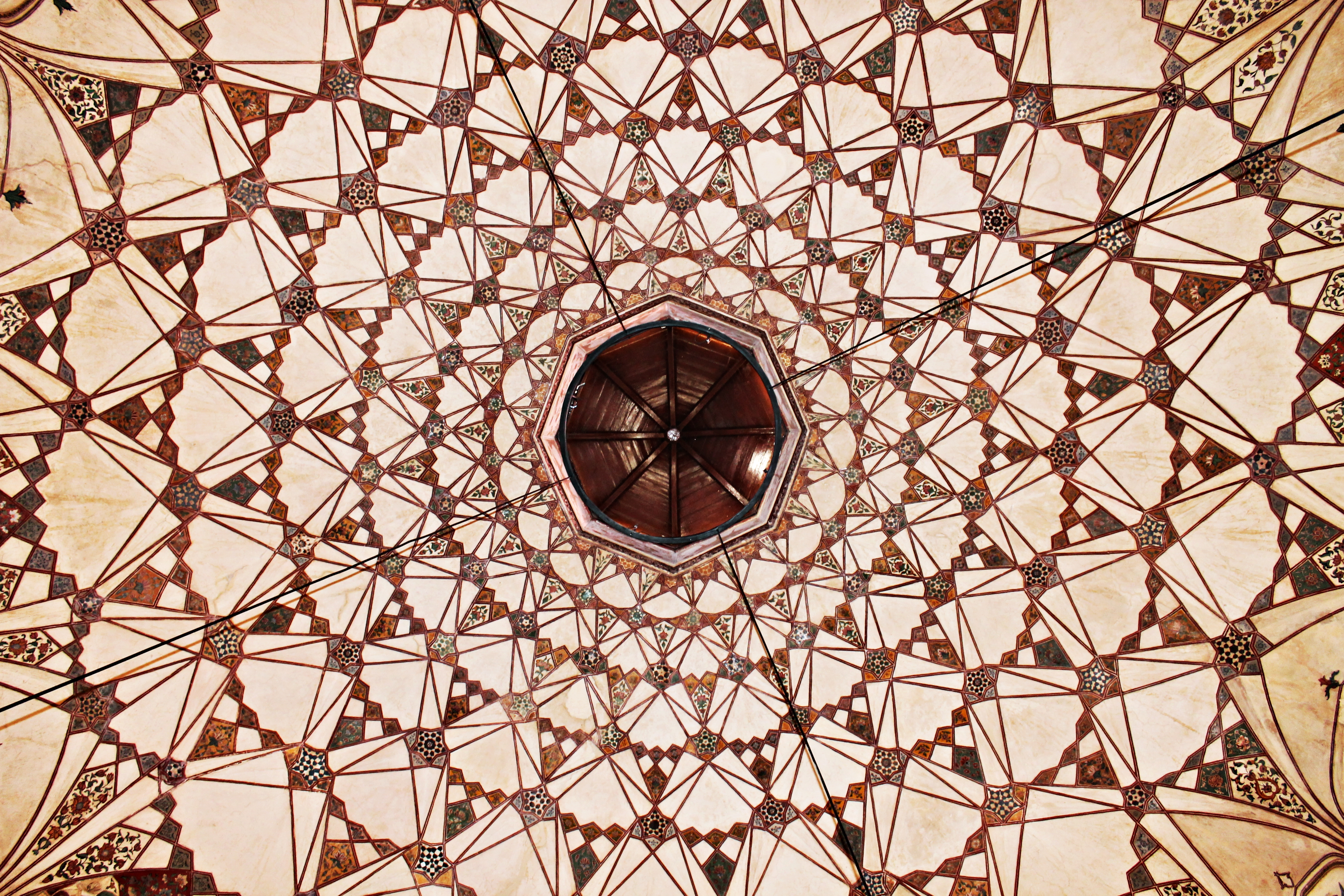
The central dome of the cold chamber features geometric frescoes

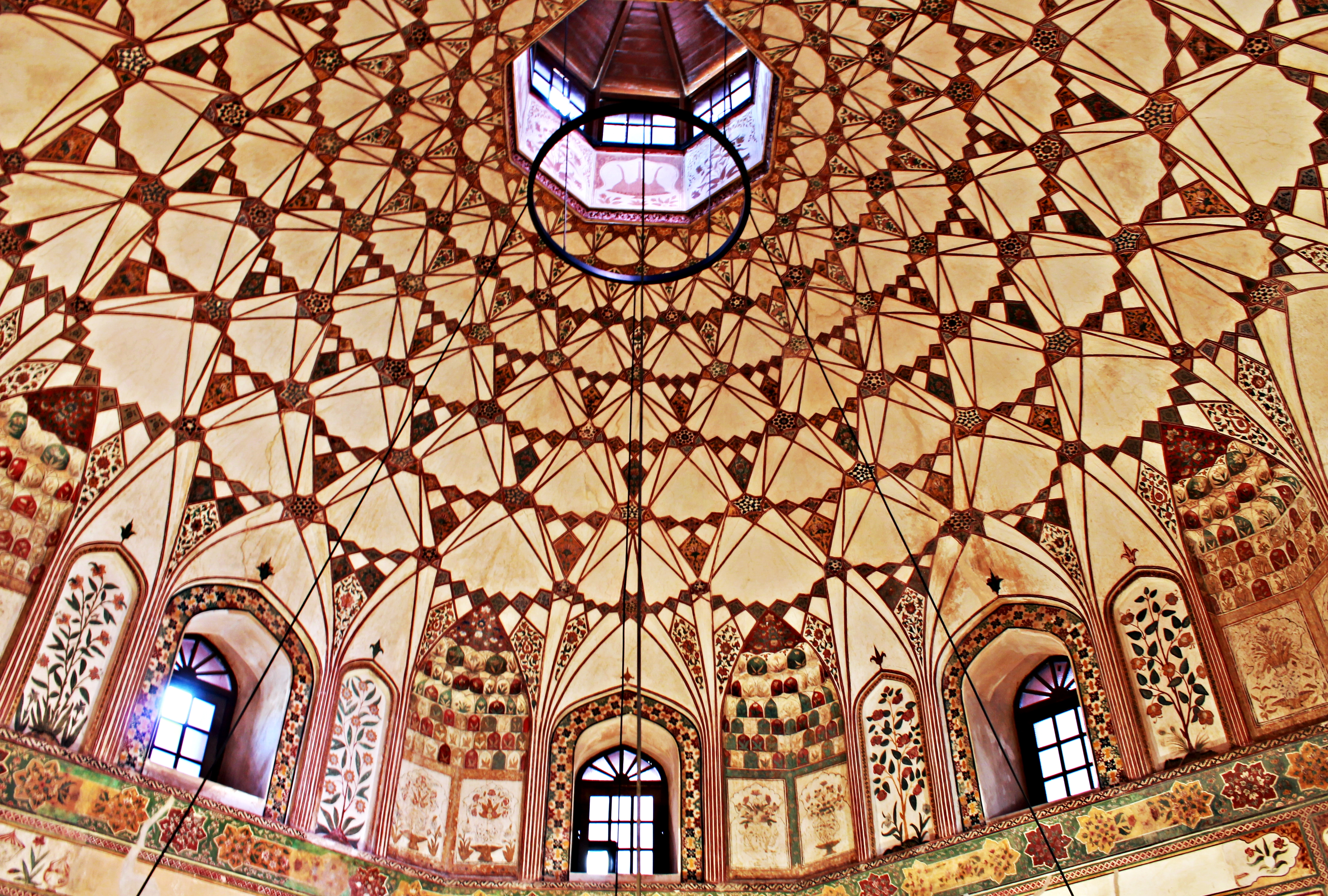
The central dome of the cold chamber features geometric frescoes

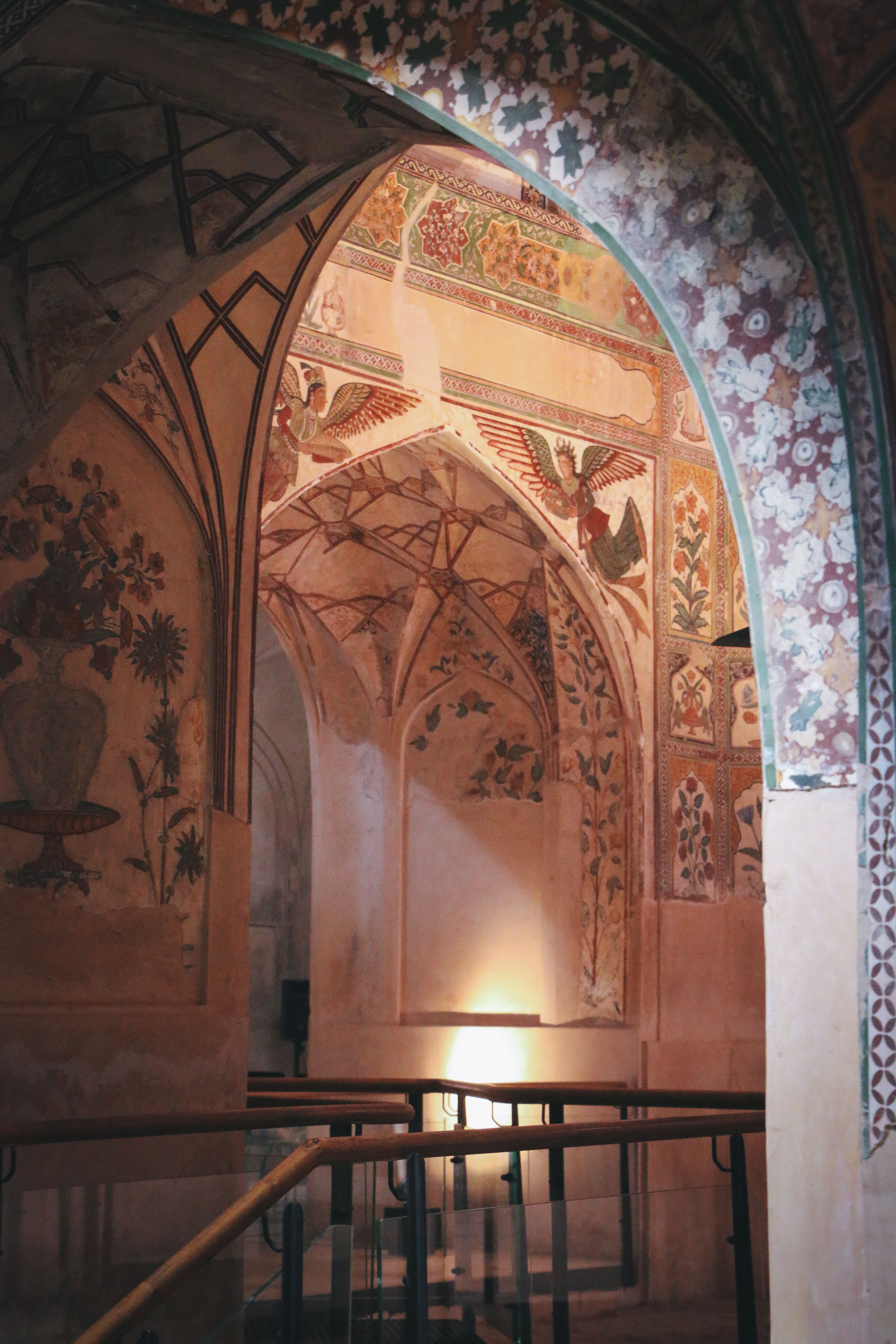

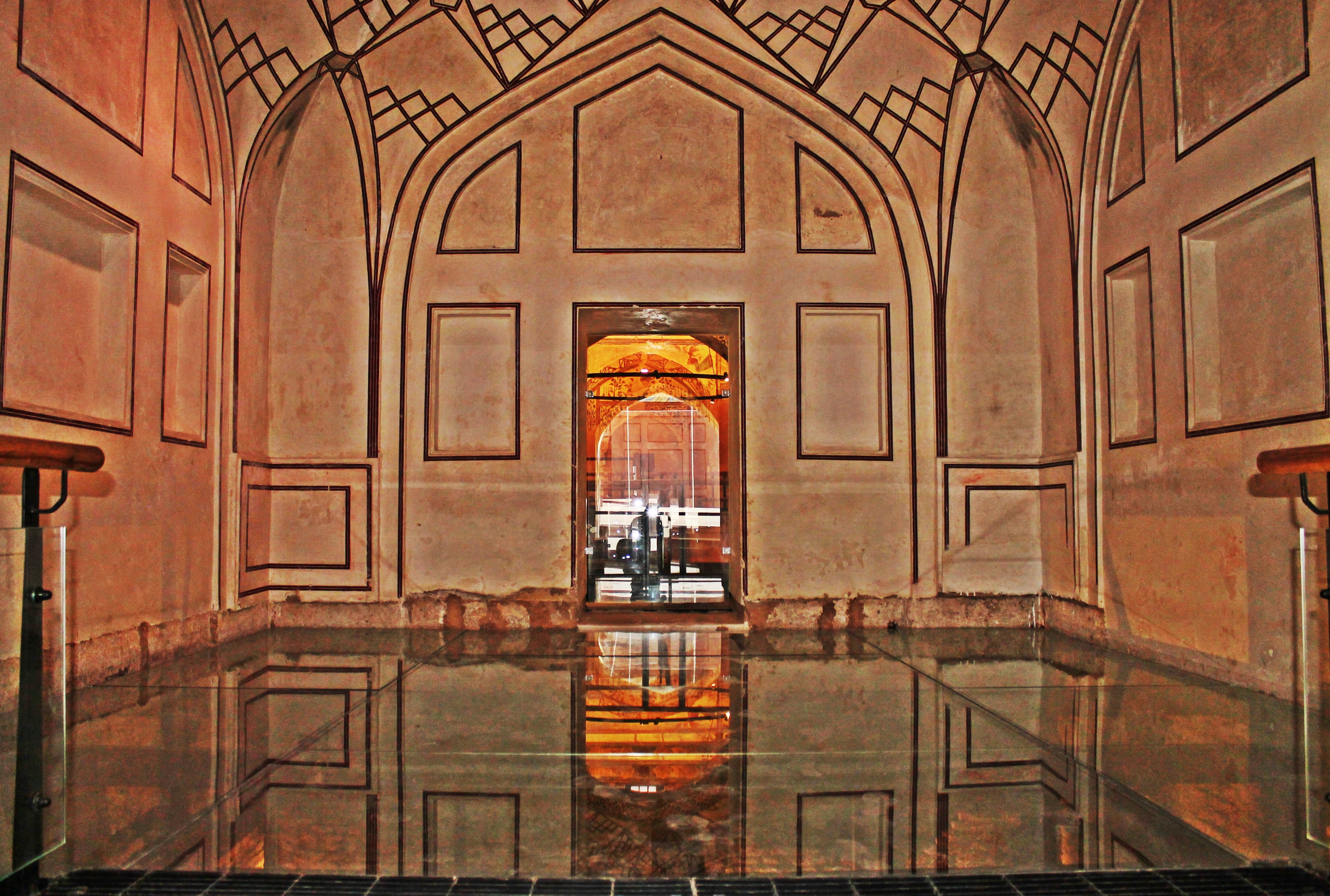
Some excavated portions are now covered by protective glass for visitors to stand on.

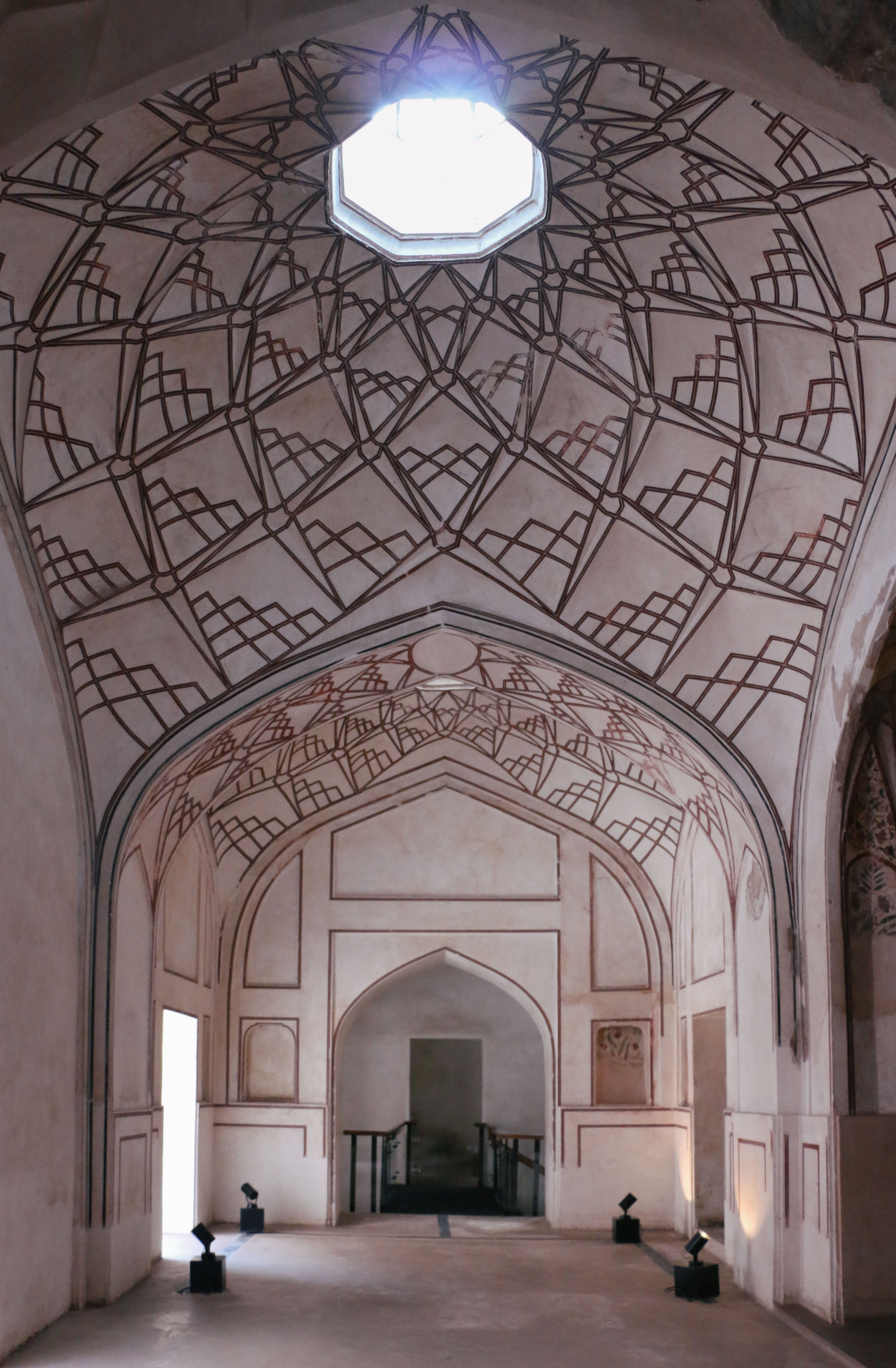
Side chambers also feature geometric ceiling designs
