= Bar Region =

Region in Punjab, Pakistan

Bar region
- Cultural region of Punjab
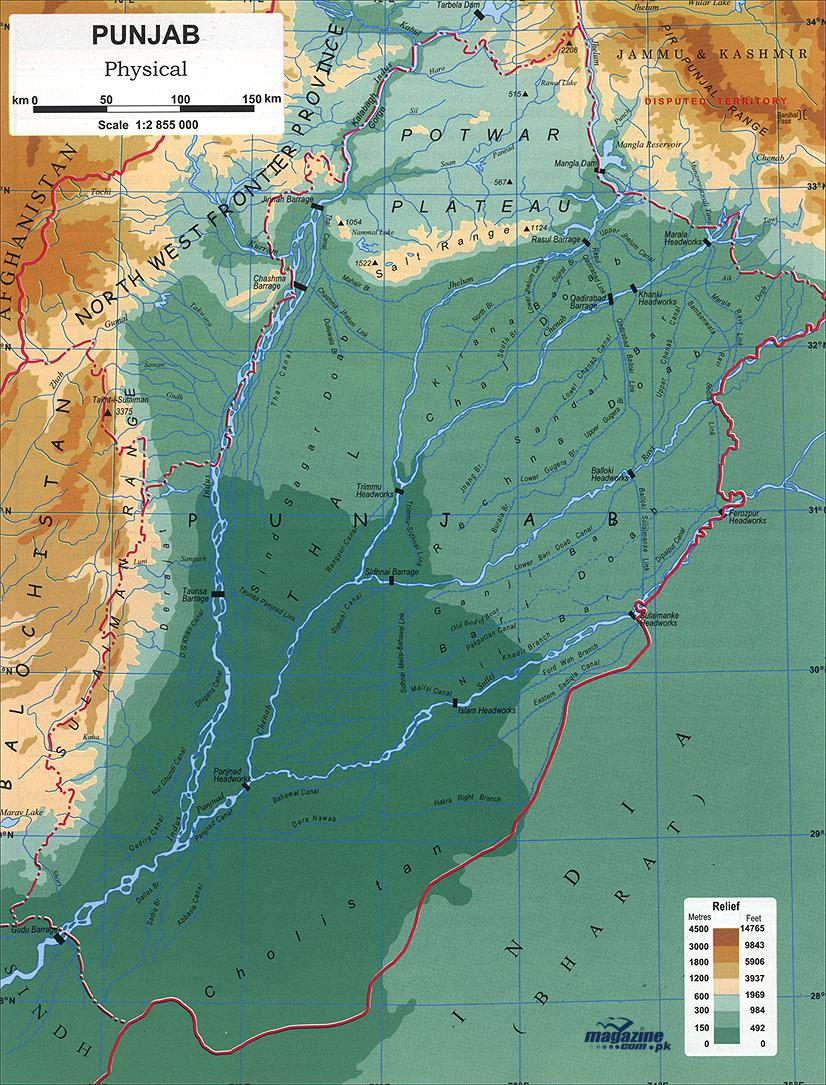
- A detailed physical map of the Punjab region, highlighting the Bar subregions between the Jhelum and Sutlej rivers.
- Country: Pakistan
- Province: Punjab

The Bar Region, or the Bars (Bār) (Punjabi: بار (Shahmukhi); Punjabi pronunciation: [bäːɾə̆]), is an upland plain region of historically uncultivated tracts between rivers located between the Jhelum and the Sutlej in the Punjab region of Pakistan. It includes several subregions such as Kirana Bar, Sandal Bar, Ganji Bar, and Neeli Bar. J. S. Grewal defines the term bār as referring to "the upland between two river valleys in the Punjab plains".

The area consists of agricultural land that was cleared in the nineteenth century for the then 'new' canal irrigation system that the British were developing at the time. The soil of the Bar Region is fertile. The plains of fertile land have been created by the stream deposits driven by the many rivers flowing from the Himalayas. The region is predominantly inhabited by ethnic Punjabis, with various local Punjabi tribes. Punjabi is the dominant language, with major spoken dialects including Jhangvi, Shahpuri, Dhanni, and Majhi. The origin of the Punjabi folktales of Heer Ranjha and Mirza Sahiban also lie in this region.

The natural boundaries of the Bar region stretch from the Jhelum River in the north to the Sutlej River in the south. It is divided into sub-regions: the Kirana Bar between the Jhelum River and the Chenab River, the Sandal Bar between the Chenab River and the Ravi River, the Ganji Bar between the Ravi River and the old bed of the Beas River, and the Neeli Bar between the old bed of the Beas River and the Sutlej River.

== Etymology ==
The term Bar in Punjabi refers to land beyond settled areas, typically describing wilderness or uncultivated plains. Some suggest it may derive from the Arabic word barr, meaning "barren land" or "uncultivated land", though this origin is considered doubtful.

The term "Bāṛ" is commonly linked to the Sanskrit root "Vri," meaning "to cover" or "to enclose," which relates to terms like "Bár (fence)," "Bári (garden)," and "Bir (forest)." These terms are associated with boundaries, enclosures, or spaces that separate cultivated land from natural areas.

Overall, "Bāṛ" refers to a boundary or enclosed space, often separating human settlements from wilderness or uncultivated land.

== History ==
The Bar Region, located in present-day Punjab Province of Pakistan, has a history that dates back to the time of the Harappan Civilization, with its earliest settlements dating to around 2600 BC. Over time, the area evolved through various cultural and agricultural phases, and today remains an important part of Punjab, known for its fertile lands and historical significance.

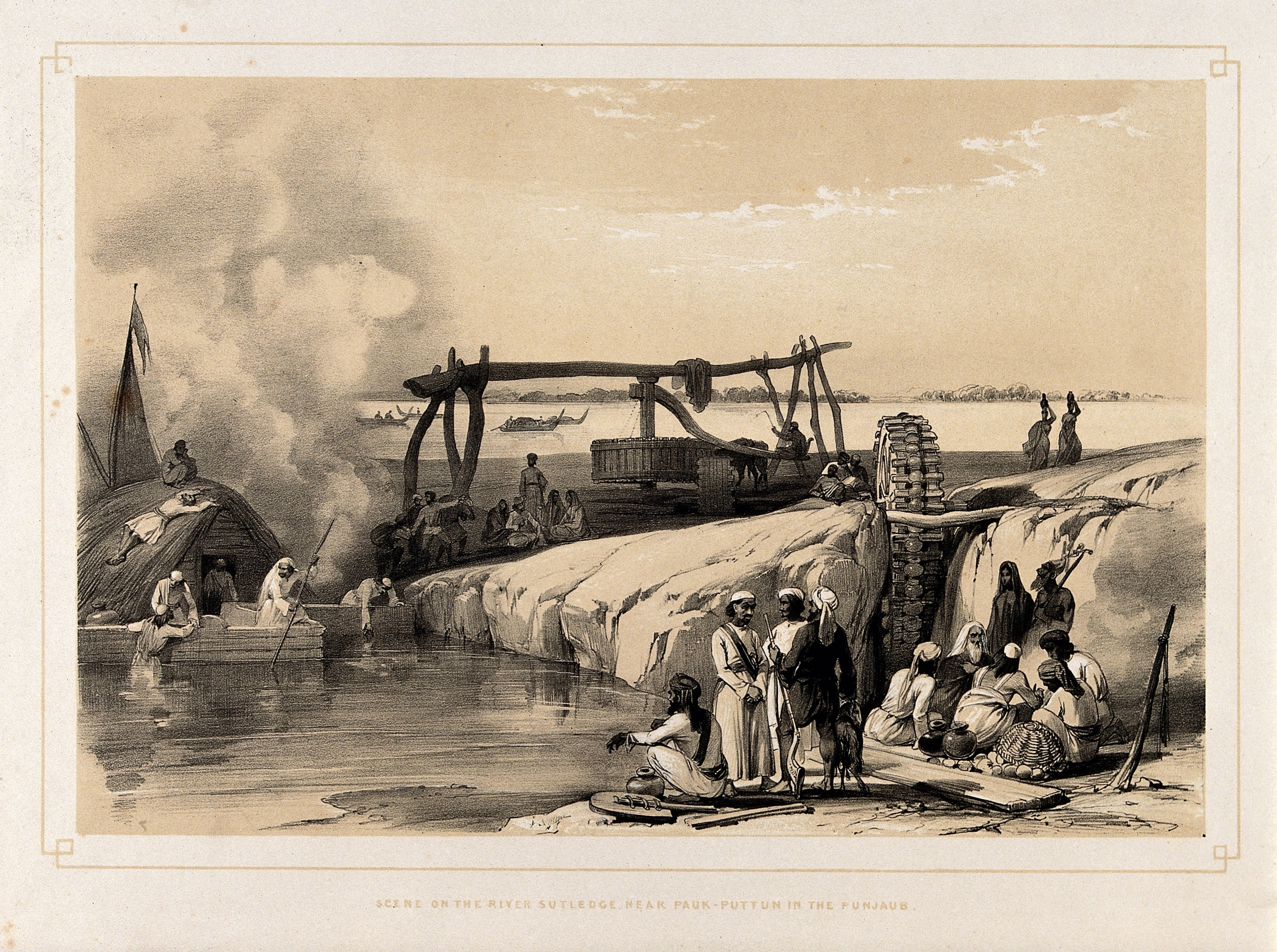
Scene on the River Sutlej near Pakpattan in the Punjab.

The Bar region was historically a sparsely populated tract of land between Punjab's rivers. Due to low rainfall, pastoral nomadism was supported by herding goats and camels. Communities moved seasonally between riverine areas in the dry months and the Bar and Thal lands after the rains, remaining within the Punjab plains year-round—unlike the nomads of Balochistan and Afghanistan.

It has been of note that, "...of sparsely populated land, the Barr country between the five rivers. This area, though possessing excellent natural soils for agriculture, was but little cultivated owing to the very scanty rainfall that has always characterized the western Punjab. The Barr country could and did, however, support an ecological system less demanding of the land than peasant agriculture. This was a type of pastoral nomadism based primarily on the herding of goats and camels.²⁹ Unlike the nomadism of Baluchistan or Afghanistan, where pastoral tribes move between plains in the wet winter season and the mountains in the dry season, the pastoralists of the western Punjab “moved only down to the riverain [sic] in the hot dry months and returned to the Barr and thāl after rains, never leaving the Punjab plains and covering at the most a distance of less than one hundred miles.”³⁰ This pattern placed the peoples of the Barr country in a symbiotic relationship with the settled peoples of the riverine area. The pastoralists needed access to the rivers for their herds, which placed them in a position of potential conflict with the riverine peoples, but they were nevertheless dependent upon the agrarian-based urban centers for trade. Moreover, and this is an important theme to which I shall return shortly, they were also dependent upon the riverine peoples for providing the rituals and belief structures that made up their religious system."

Many tribes of the region embraced Islam during the medieval period. According to the Jawahir-i-Faridi, Jat clans such as the Khokhars, Bhattis, Dhudhis, Hans, Johiyas, and Wattus converted during the time of Baba Farid. Over time, some of these tribes established their Muslim-ruled polities, including the Sial dynasty, the Pakpattan State, and the Johiyas, who ruled parts of the Jangladesh region.

Describing the region, historian David Gilmartin notes:

"...were those pastoralists who circulated within the great Punjab Barrrs, the arid doabs between the five rivers crossing the heart of western Punjab. These were the great pastoral "tribes" of the Sutlej, Ravi, and Chenab, whose migrations extended at the time of annexation to within thirty miles of Lahore: the Kharrals, the Khatias, the Wattus, the Sials, and many others. They moved annually from fixed camps in the high Barrr (known as rahnas among the cattle nomads and jhoks among the camel nomads) down to summer pastures along the rivers. As the settlement officer of Gugera observed, "[T]he immense herds of cattle, which roam about the centre of both the Barree and Rechna Doab, remain in the vicinity of these Ruhnas from the commencement of the rains till the end of February." Then, when pasturage disappeared in the Barr as the summer approached, they moved down toward the banks of the rivers, where vegetation moistened from the previous year's floods survived the hot weather."

During the 18th century, the Bar region witnessed upheaval during the Nader Shah invasion of 1739. The Gondal chiefs resisted his forces and helped prevent the devastation of Gondal Bar. In both Gondal and Sandal Bars, his army encountered small but organized local resistance.

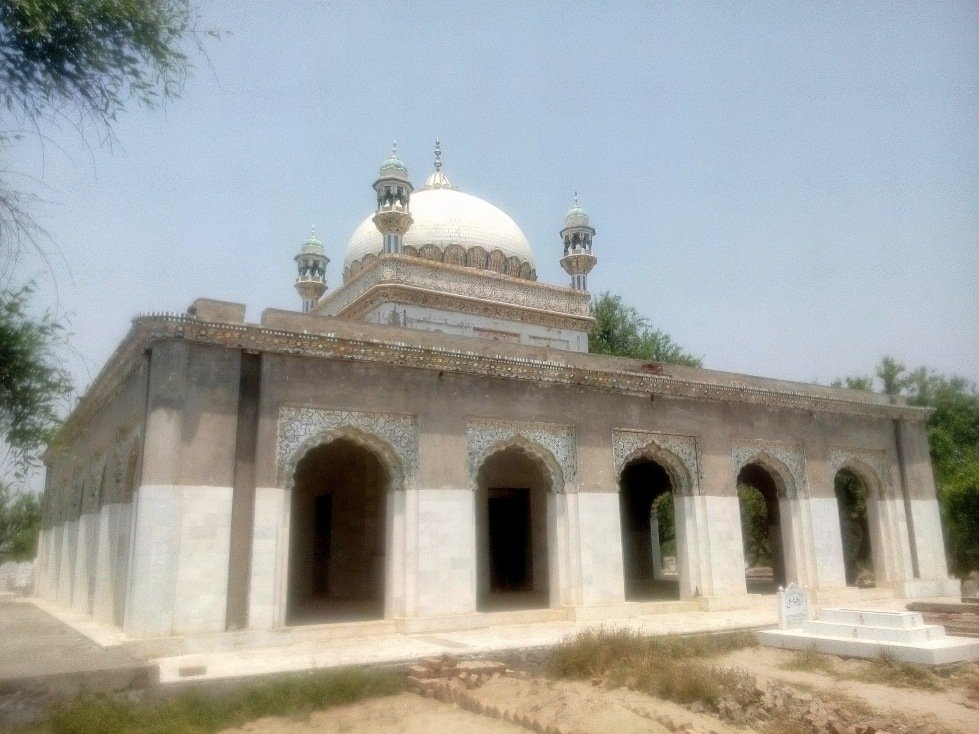
Tomb of Rai Ahmad Khan Kharal in Jhamra

In the colonial period, the Bar region remained a center of resistance to British authority. Rai Ahmad Khan Kharal, a prominent chieftain of the Kharal tribe from Jhamra in Sandal Bar, led a major rebellion during the Indian Rebellion of 1857. Several Bar tribes, including the Watto, Fatyana, Baghela, Kathia, and Johiya supported him.

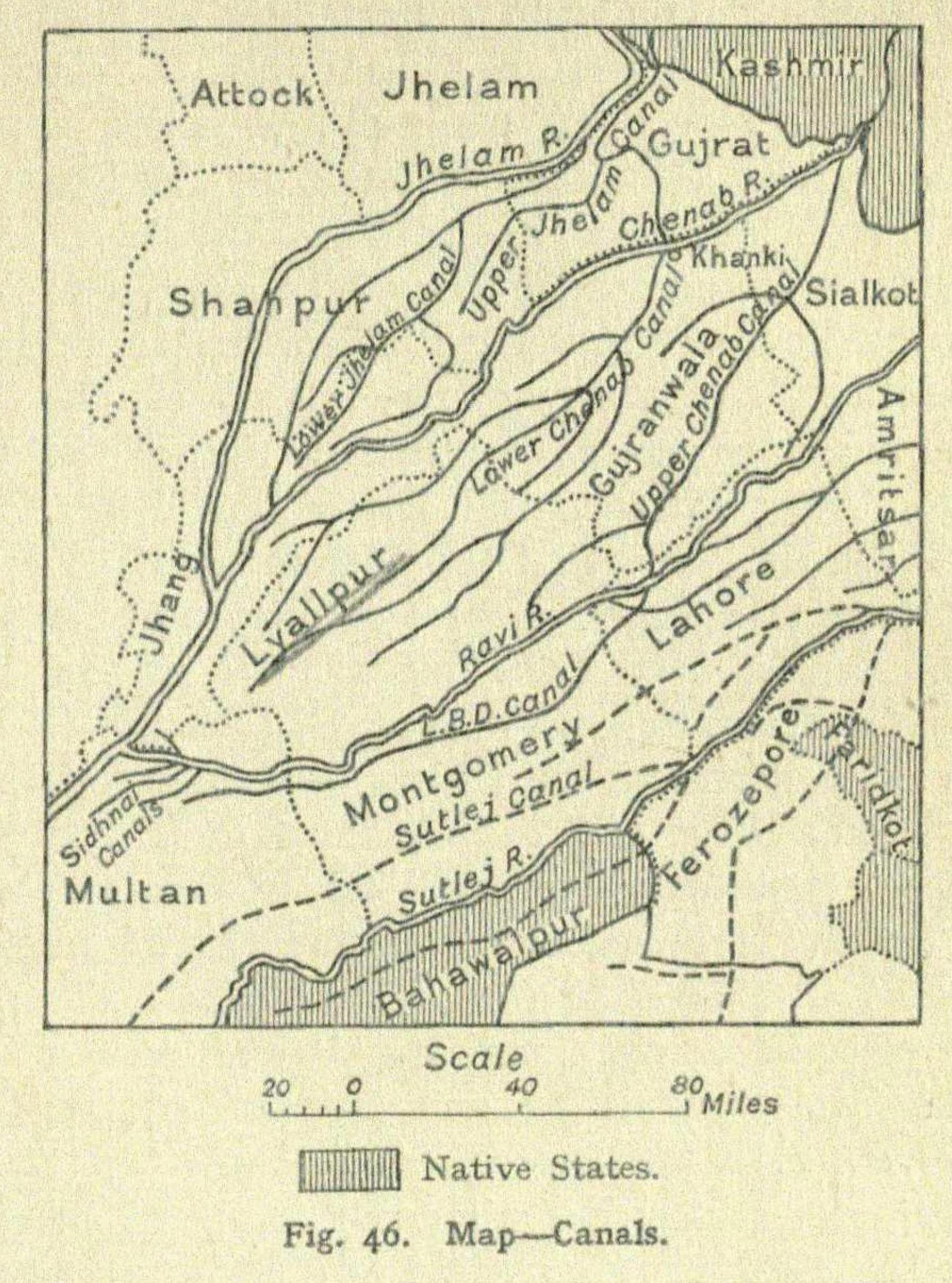
Map of canals in the western part of Punjab Province, British India, published in 'The Panjab, North-West Frontier Province and Kashmir' (1916)

The British established a network of canal colonies across the Bar region. These projects transformed the landscape and attracted settlers from other parts of Punjab, turning the area into a fertile and agriculturally productive zone.

== Demographics ==
Punjabis are native people of the region and speak Jatki dialect, along with closely related subdialects such as Jhangvi and Shahpuri.

The major tribes of the region include: Bhattis, Bullas, Chadhars, Chaughtas, Gondals, Johiyas, Kathias, Khokhars, Kharals, Ranjhas, Sials, Tarars,Wattus and Thaeems.

== Sub-regions of the Bar Region ==
Kirana Bar (Kɪrāṇā Bār; Punjabi: کرانہ بار (Shahmukhi); Punjabi pronunciation: [kɪɾɑːnɑː bɑːɾ]) or Gondal Bar (Gōndal Bār; Punjabi: گوندل بار (Shahmukhi); Punjabi pronunciation: [ɡəndəl bɑːɾ]) is located between the Jhelum River and the Chenab River. It includes the central and southern parts of Chaj Doab and includes the modern-day districts of Mandi Bahauddin, Sargodha, Gujrat (southern parts), and the western parts of Chiniot (such as Lalian), along with parts of Jhang District. The region is named after the Kirana Hills, a mountain range located in the area, and is also referred to as Gondal Bar after the Gondal Punjabi Jat clan that dominated the region. The land is known for its agricultural richness, particularly after the introduction of canal irrigation.

Sandal Bar (Sāndal Bār; Punjabi: ساندل بار (Shahmukhi); Punjabi pronunciation: [ˈsændəl bɑːɾ]) is located between the Chenab and Ravi rivers, covering parts of Rechna Doab. It includes the modern-day districts of Faisalabad, Jhang, Toba Tek Singh, Nankana Sahib, Chiniot, Hafizabad, Khanewal, Vehari, Toba Tek Singh, and parts of Sheikhupura (specifically Safdarabad and Sheikhupura). The region is named after Sandal, the grandfather of the 16th-century Punjabi chieftain Dulla Bhatti, known for his rebellion against the Mughal Empire. Rai Ahmad Khan Kharal, a Punjabi Muslim chieftain of the Kharal tribe, hailed from this region and led the resistance against British rule. He was a prominent figure in the Sandal Bar, and after his martyrdom, he became a folk hero in Punjabi literature.

Neeli Bar (Nīlī Bār; Punjabi: نیلی بار (Shahmukhi); Punjabi pronunciation: [niːlī bɑːɾ]) is located between the old bed of the Beas and the Sutlej River. It includes the modern-day districts of Vehari, Pakpattan, and Okara (specifically the Dipalpur tehsil).

Ganji Bar (Gaṅjī Bār; Punjabi: گنجی بار (Shahmukhi); Punjabi pronunciation: [ɡənʤī bɑːɾ]) is located between the Ravi and the old bed of the Beas River. This region includes the modern-day districts of Khanewal, Sahiwal, and the cities of Okara (Renala Khurd and Okara, including parts of the Dipalpur tehsil of Okara District). The area is known for its fertile soil, which became suitable for agriculture after the introduction of irrigation systems.

== Districts of the Bar Region ==
The indigenous people of the Bar region speak the Jatki dialect of Punjabi, which includes sub-dialects such as Jhangvi, Shahpuri, and Dhani. While Dhani is not spoken in the natural Bar region, areas outside its boundaries that speak the Dhani and Shahpuri sub-dialects are still considered part of the Bar due to cultural and linguistic ties.

The following districts are classified as Bar:

Bar districts of Punjab, Pakistan
Faisalabad
Jhang
Toba Tek Singh
Hafizabad
Okara
Vehari
Khanewal
Pakpattan
Sargodha
Chiniot
Nankana Sahib
Bahawalnagar
Mandi Bahauddin
Sahiwal
Bahawalpur (only Hasilpur and Khairpur Tamewali)
Sheikhupura (only Safdarabad and Sheikhupura)
Chakwal
Talagang
Jhelum (only Pind Dadan Khan and Khewra)
Attock (where Jatki dominates, with 65% of the district's population speaking it)
Khushab

== See also ==
- Baar di boli
- Kirana Bar
- Sandal Bar
- Ganji Bar
- Neeli Bar
- Doab
