= Bari Doab =

Region of Punjab

- Natural region
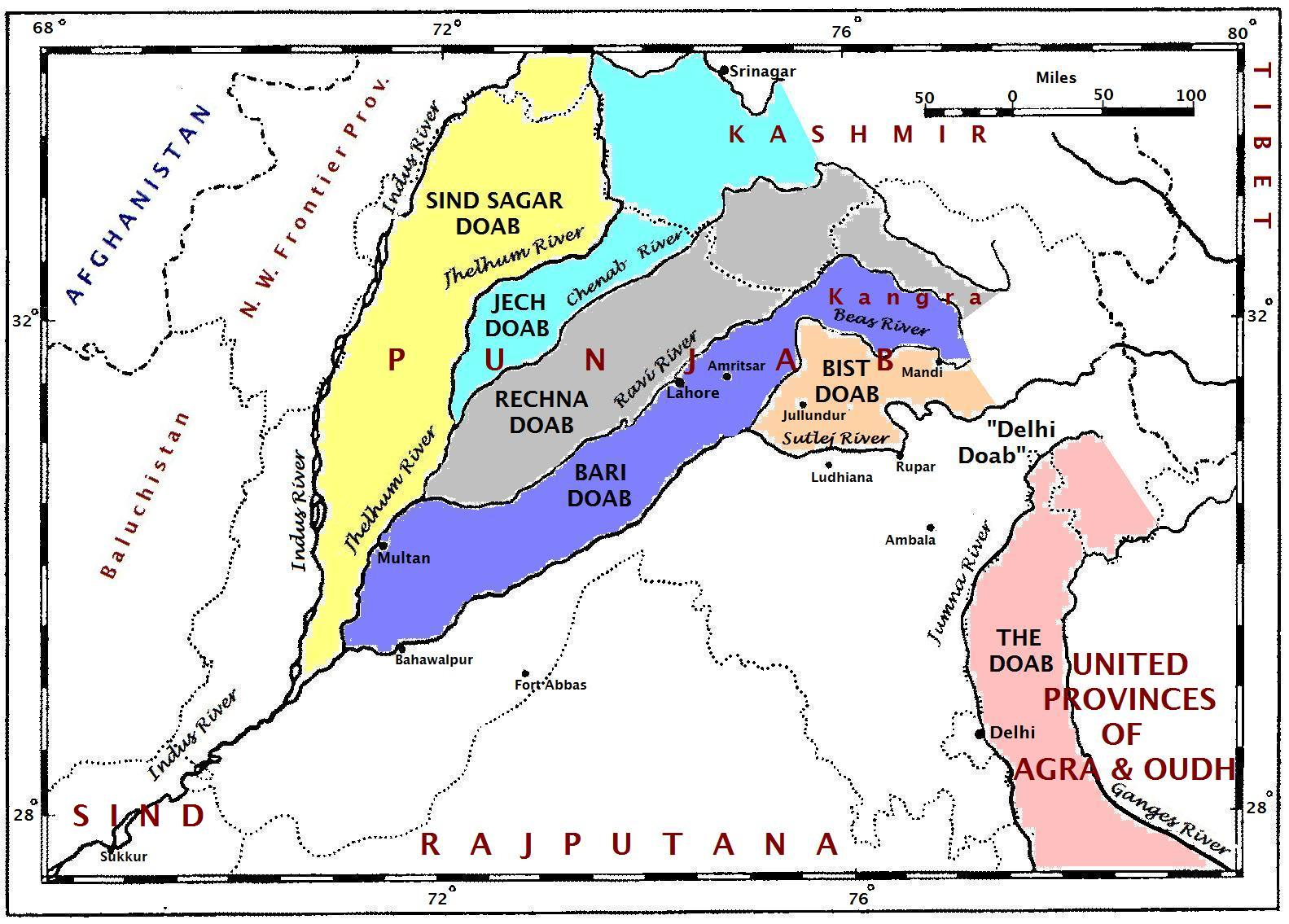
- A map of the Punjab region c. 1947 showing the different doabs
- Interactive map of Bari Doab
- Country: Pakistan
- Province: Punjab

The Bari Doab is one of the Punjab doabs located in the upper south-east corner of Punjab, Pakistan. The doab lies between the Beas/Sutlej and Ravi rivers. A considerable portion of the Bari Doab is in the Majha region.

== Hydrology ==
Historically, the Beas river used to flow through the middle of the Bari Doab, splitting the region in two into the Ganji and Neeli bars, however the Beas river has since shifted its course. The flow of the Beas river, which ran through the high-bar of the Bari Doab, shifted between 1750 and 1800, with it being captured by the Sutlej river, after many previous changes to its flow throughout the preceding centuries.

== Geography ==
The upper-area of the doab consists of Kasur, Okara, Sahiwal, Pakpattan, and Vehari districts, which is well-irrigated and under agriculture. The southwestern part of the region approaches the Bahawalpur desert and becomes increasingly arid and sparsely populated.

== See also ==
- Bar Region
