= Kharal =

Punjabi tribe

‌Kharal‌
- Jāti: Rajput, Jats
- Religions: Islam
- Languages: Punjabi, mainly Baar di boli
- Country: ‌Pakistan
- Feudal title: ‌Rai

Kharal (Punjabi: کھرَل) is a Muslim tribe predominantly found in the Sandal Bar region of Punjab.

== History and description ==
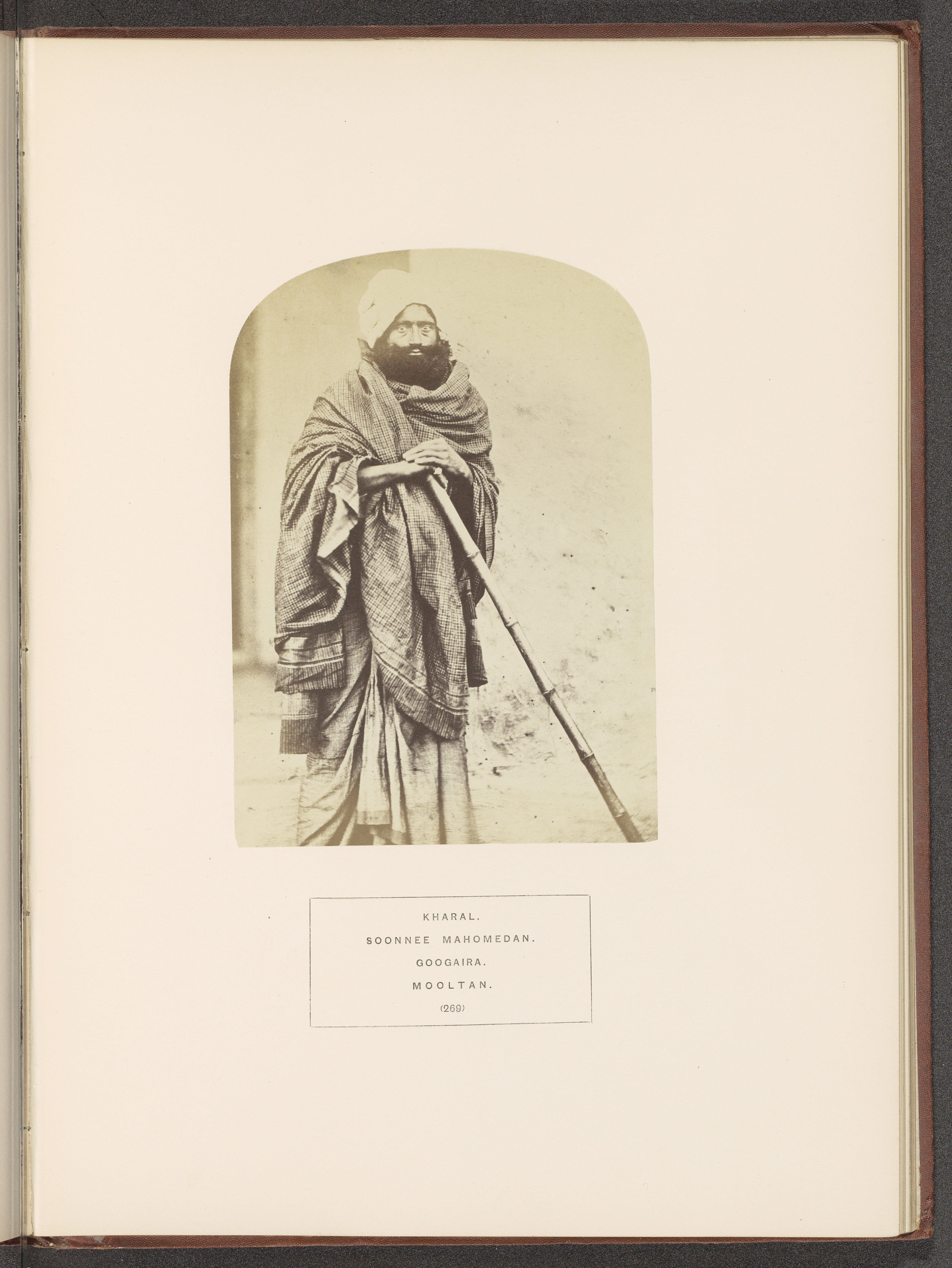
Kharal tribesman of Gogairah

The Kharals predominantly inhabit the western plains of Punjab that lie below the Salt Range and its surrounding areas. The Kharals seem to be most concentrated in the Ravi River Valley between Lahore and the former Montgomery District, this corresponds well to Ain-i-Akbari (1595 CE) listing of Kharal Zamindaris in different Parganas. Additionally, Kharals were designated as a Martial race being known for their bravery and fierceness.

Modern Indian and Pakistani census reports mention Kharals as Rajputs though a journal by Government College University listed Kharals along other tribes as Jats.

Rai Ahmad Khan Kharal is a historical personality, who was the chieftain of the Kharal tribe, who revolted against the British in the 1857 revolt, where he consequently took leadership of the many local tribes in the region. He was killed while offering afternoon prayers by the British on September 21, 1857.

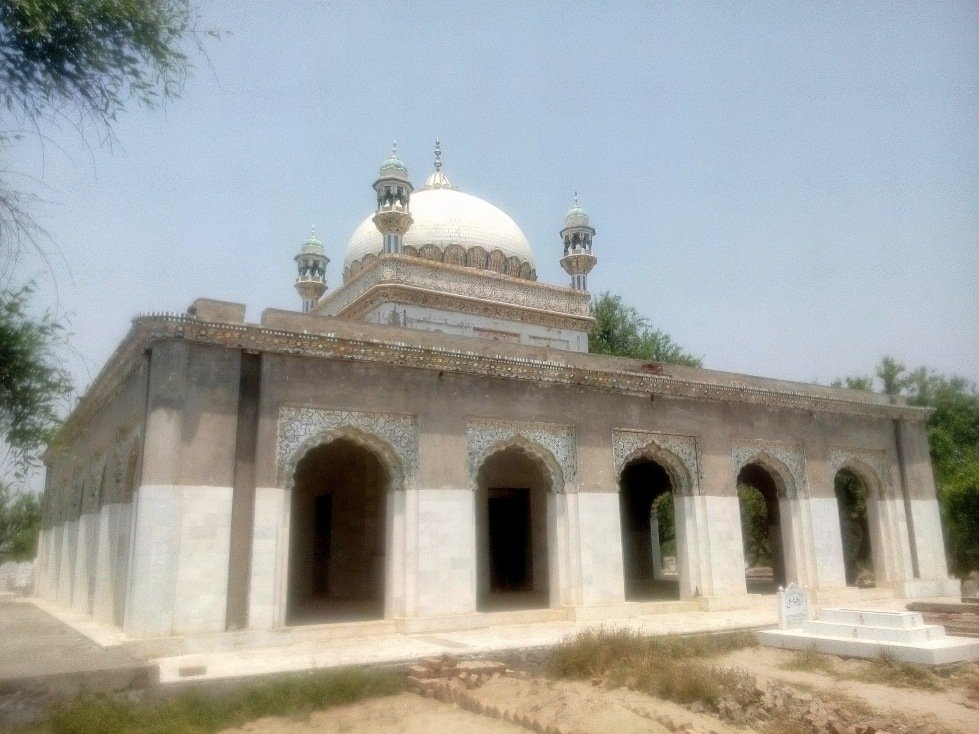
Tomb of Rai Ahmad Khan Kharal in Jhamra

The Kharals are also famous in the Indian subcontinent due to the one of the greatest and tragic Punjabi romances called Mirza Sahiban. According to the story of Mirza Sahiban as narrated by the Punjabi writer Pilu, the story's protagonist is Mirza, son of the chief of the Kharal of Danabad, who falls in love with his cousin Sahiban, of the Sial tribe. To date there have been many film adaptations in both Pakistan and India of the Story of Mirza and Sahiban.

== Subclans ==
The Kharals have numerous subdivisions more than 150 and clans some of which include Nuwenke, Rehman e (ky), Tule, Basheraky, Ablana, Mangera, Chimnay, Sheraky, Goggara, Lakhera, Upera, Lakhera, Peroka, Jalab ke, Begeke, Randhaira, Lalhaira, Rubera, Sahi, Lodike[y], Dehar, Churiara, Khar, Bhandra, Daulke[y], Sherke[y] and Gogera; the Kharals use many titles including Rai, Chaudhry and Malik but Rai is mostly used.

- Khar (Punjabi: کھر) is a Punjabi Jat tribe found in Pakistan and is considered among the prominent tribes of Muzaffargarh District. They are a branch of the larger Kharal tribe and multiple legends exist as to why their name was shortened from Kharal to Khar.

== Notable people ==
- Rai Ahmad Khan Kharal, Ruler (nawab) of Jhamra, chieftain of the Kharal tribe.
- Khalid Ahmed Kharal, Former Federal Minister of Information of Pakistan, former Secretary General of Pakistan People's Party, former ankhpal kharalCivil Services Officer.
- Naseem Kharal, Sindhi landlord and short story writer.
- Rai Mansab Ali Khan, Former Provincial Minister for Social Welfare, former Member of the Provincial Assembly of the Punjab.
- Ghulam Mustafa Khar, Feudal Lord, Former Governor of Punjab, former Chief Minister of Punjab.
- Ghulam Noor Rabbani Khar, Former Member of National Assembly of Pakistan.
- Hina Rabbani Khar, Former Minister of State for Foreign Affairs, Member of National Assembly of Pakistan.
- Malik Ghulam Raza Rabbani Khar, Former Member of National Assembly of Pakistan.
- Malik Ghulam Arbi Khar, Former Member of National Assembly of Pakistan
- Malik Ghulam Raza Rabbani Khar, Member of National Assembly of Pakistan.
- Rai Ghulam Mujtaba Kharal, Former Member of National Assembly of Pakistan.
- Rai Usman Khan Kharal, Former Member of the Provincial Assembly of the Punjab.
- Rai Haider Ali Khan Kharal, Former Member of the Provincial Assembly of the Punjab.
- Naeem Ahmed Kharal, Former Member of the Provincial Assembly of Sindh.

== External links‌ ==
- ‌Kharal and Berkley (19th century British ‌India) on Dawn (newspaper‌)
