= Kirana Bar =

Region in Punjab, Pakistan

Kirana Bar or Gondal Bar (also spelt Karana; Punjabi: کرانہ بار) is the section of the Bar region in western Punjab Punjab in Pakistan located between the rivers Jhelum and Chenab. It comprises the central and southern parts of Jech Doab, and corresponds to the present-day Mandi Bahauddin, Sargodha and Gujrat districts in Pakistani Punjab.

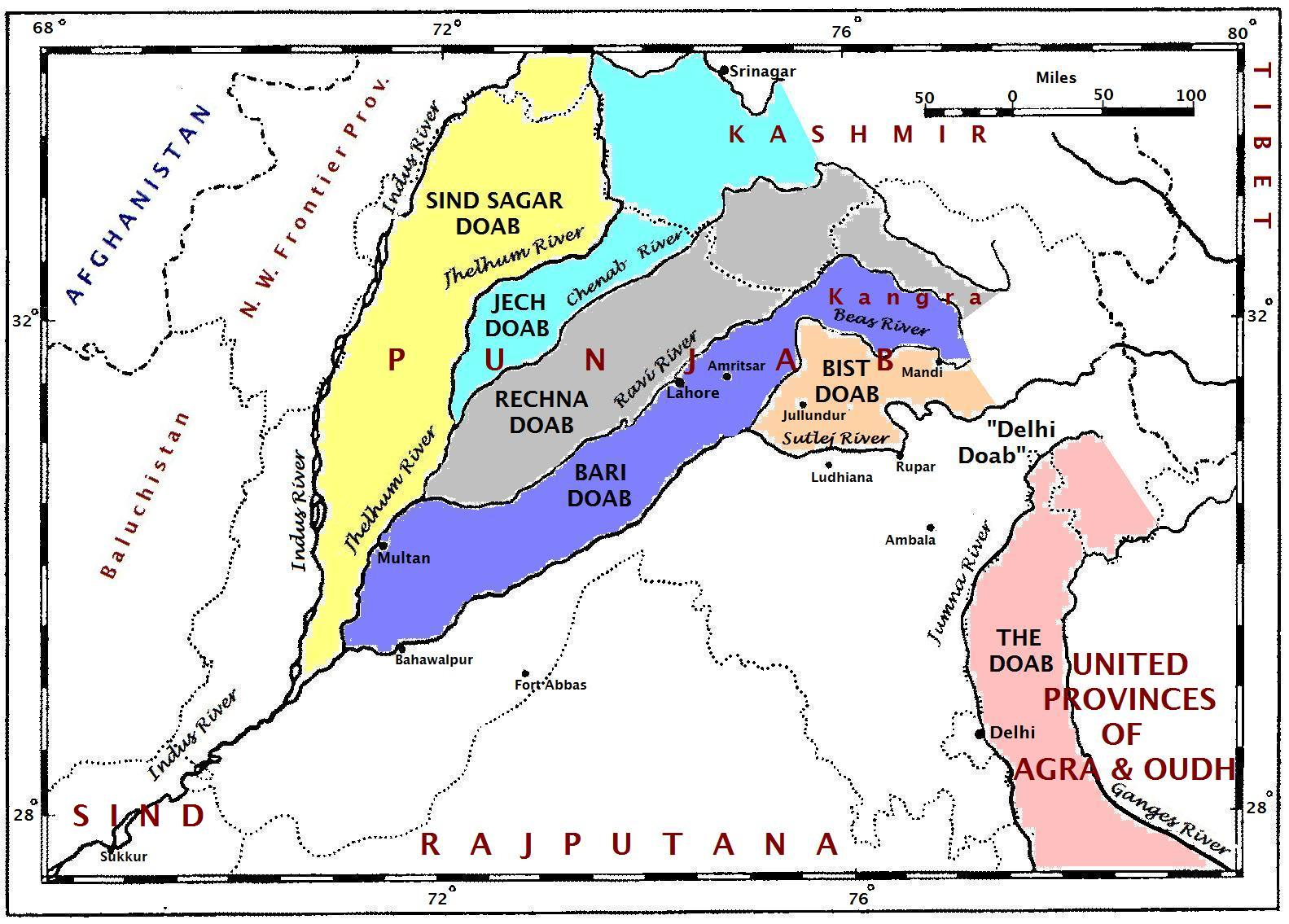
The Kirana bar falls within the lower half of Jech Doab (blue colour) in this map

Kirana Bar is named after Kirana Hills, a mountain range present in the region. It is also known as Gondal Bar, after the Punjabi Muslim Jat clan of Gondals who held the tract in the 18th century.

Since the Gondal families were Zaildar at the time of British rule, the first-born son of the Zaildar was given the title Sahibzada.

The lands of the Kirana Bar to the east and south of the hills are of superb quality for agriculture. After slight showers of rain, the whole land is carpeted with grass. Better rain crops are grown here than in the Sandal Bar. To the west of Kirana and westwards until the villages near the Jhelum river are reached, the bar soil deteriorates, and more and more kallar (water logging) is found. The Kirana Bar is demarcated from the 'Utar' (North) by the same fall or slope as the Sandal Bar. Generally, this ledge forms the boundary between the villages and the Government waste grounds. But few villages possess lands beyond the high bank, or 'Nakka' as it is called. The flora of this Bar is much the same as that of the Sandal Bar.

== See also ==
- Sandal Bar
- Mountain ranges of Pakistan
- List of mountains in Pakistan
