= Indo-Gangetic Plain =

Geographical plain in South Asia

Coordinates: 27°N 80°E

- Geographical region
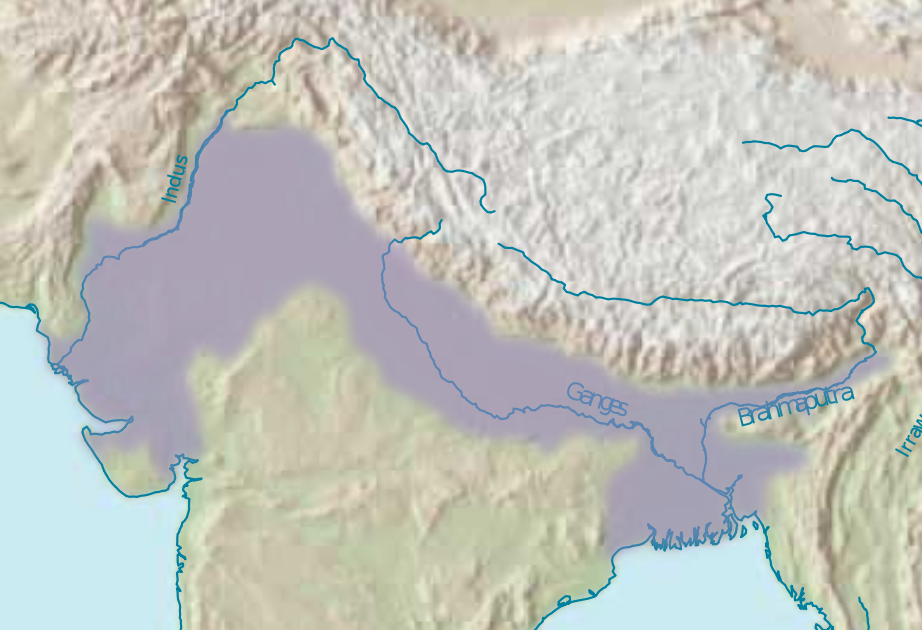
- Map of the Indo-Gangetic Plain
- Country: India, Pakistan, Bangladesh, Nepal, Bhutan

Area
  - Total: 700,000 km^{2} (270,000 sq mi)

The Indo-Gangetic Plain, also known as the North Indian Plain or the Indus-Gangetic Plain, is a fertile plain spanning 700,000 km^{2} (270,000 sq mi) across the northern, north-western and north-eastern part of South Asia. It encompasses northern, western and eastern India, eastern Pakistan, southern Nepal and Bhutan, and almost all of Bangladesh. It is named after the two major river systems that drain the region–Indus and Ganges.

It stretches from the Himalayas in the north to the northern edge of the Deccan Plateau in the south, and extends from North East India in the east to the Iranian border in the west. The region is home to many major cities and nearly one-seventh of the world's population. As the region was formed by the deposits of the three major rivers–Indus, Ganges and Brahmaputra, the plains consist of the world's largest expanse of uninterrupted alluvium. Due to its rich water resources, it is one of the world's most densely populated and intensely farmed areas.

== History ==
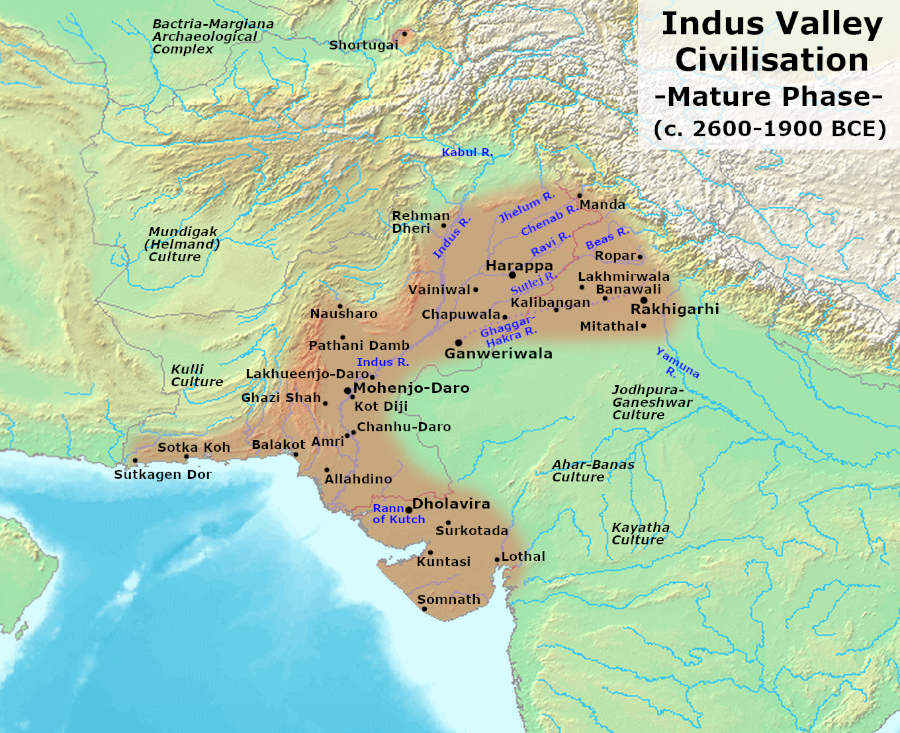
Extent of the Indus Valley Civilisation on the western part of the plains.

The region was home to the Indus Valley Civilisation in 3000 BCE, which was one of the earliest human settlements in the Indian subcontinent. During the Vedic period (c. 1500 – 600 BCE), the region was referred to as "Aryavarta" (Land of the Aryans). According to Manusmṛti (2.22), 'Aryavarta' is "the tract between the Himalaya and the Vindhya ranges, from the Eastern Sea (Bay of Bengal) to the Western Sea (Arabian Sea)". The region was part of what was historically referred to as Hindustan, a term used to refer to the whole of the Indian subcontinent. The term "Hindustani" is also commonly used to refer to the people, music, and culture of the region.

The fertile terrain facilitated the rise and expansion of various empires such as the Mauryas, Kushan, Guptas, all of whom had their demographic and political centers in the Indo-Gangetic plain. The Maurya Empire existed from 4th to 2nd century BCE and unified most of the Indian subcontinent into one state, and was the largest empire ever to exist on the Indian subcontinent. The Kushan Empire expanded out of what is now Afghanistan into the northwest of the Indian subcontinent in the middle of the 1st century CE. Maritime trade along the Silk Road flourished during the period. The Gupta period existed from the 4th to 7th century CE and is noted for its arts, architecture and science.

In the 12th century CE, much of the region was ruled by the Rajputs. In 1191 CE, the Rajput king Prithviraj Chauhan unified several Rajput states and defeated the invading army of Shihabuddin Ghori in the First Battle of Tarain. However, Shihabuddin defeated the Rajputs in the Second Battle of Tarain, which led to the rise of the Delhi Sultanate in the region in the 13th century CE. In 1526 CE, Babur swept across the Khyber Pass and established the Mughal Empire, which ruled for almost the next three centuries.

The Maratha Empire founded by Chatrapati Shivaji, briefly captured the region in the early 18th century CE. The Sikh Empire was established by Ranjit Singh around the same time in the north western part of the region. The Europeans arrived in the end of the 15th century CE in peninsular India. The English East India company's victory in the Battle of Plassey (1757) and Battle of Buxar (1764) consolidated the company's power in the lower Gangetic plain. With the defeat of the Marathas, the entire region came under the control of British Raj and remained same until the Indian Independence in 1947.

== Geology ==
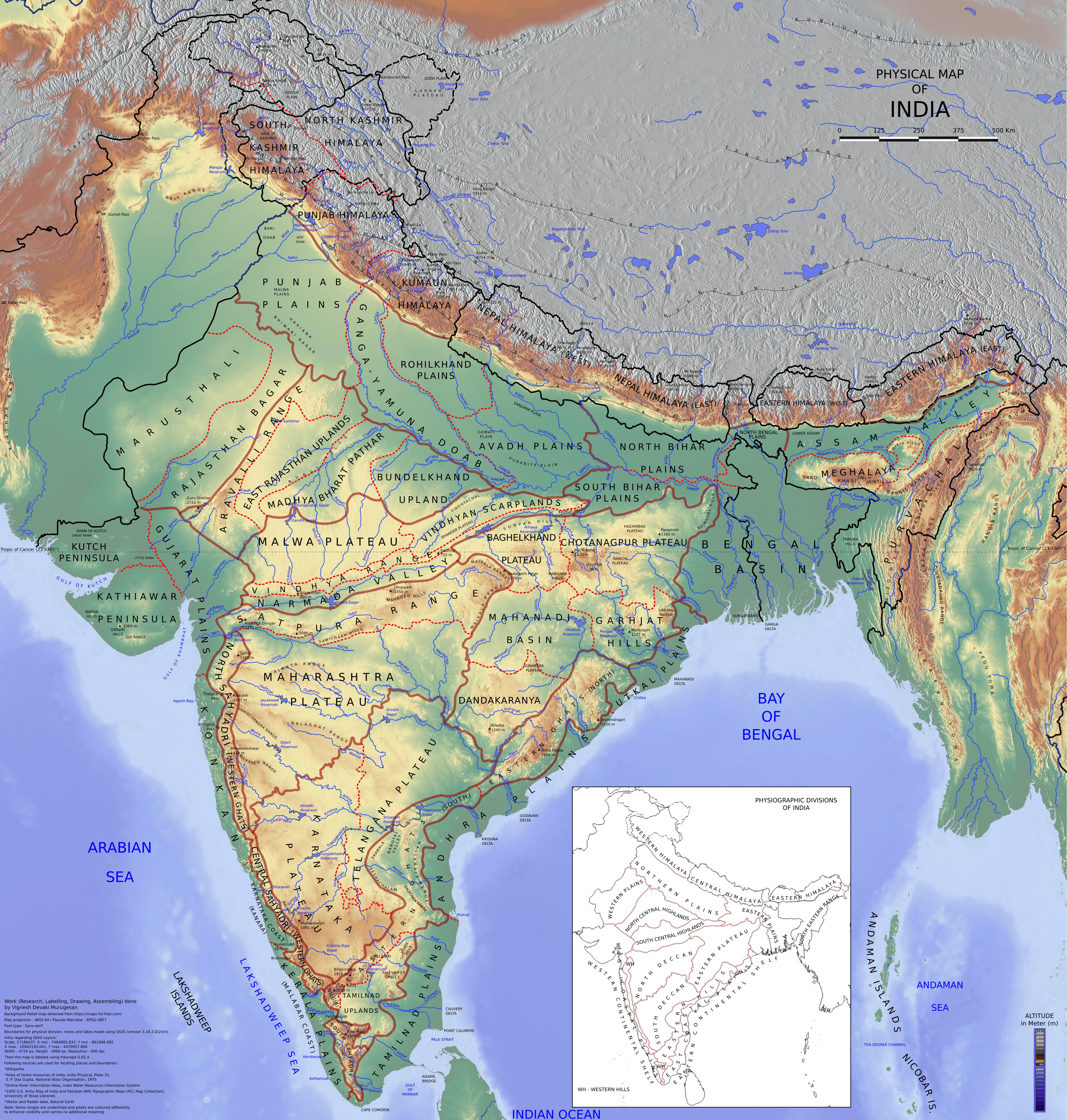
Physical map of India, showing the different regions.

The plains were named after the two major river systems that drain the region–Indus and Ganges. The region was formed as a result of continuous deposition of silt by the major river systems of Indus, Ganges and Brahmaputra in the depression that existed between the Himalayas in the north and Deccan Plateau in the south. There are different theories about how the depression was formed. Darashaw Wadia, said the depression was a furrow that existed since the formation of the plateau in the south and the mountains in the north. Edward Suess suggested that the depression was a large syncline that was formed when the southward advance of the Himalayas was blocked by the Indian landmass.

Sydney Burrard opined that the region was a deep rift that existed in the Earth's crust, which was subsequently filled with alluvium. He also pointed out the existence of other rift valleys in the Himalayan and Deccan plateau region. However, geologists such as Ferdinand Hayden and Richard Oldham have rejected this stating that there is no evidence of existence of a rift valley and that the existence of such a large rift valley is not possible. According to the recent research, sediment deposited at the bed of the pre-historic Tethys Sea folded towards the northern end due to the northward drift of the Indian plate and a trough was formed later due to the emergence of the Himalayas in the north. Beneath the silt deposition, the region rests on hard crystalline rocks which connect the Himalayan region with the peninsula. As the region was formed by the deposits of major rivers, the plains consists of the world's largest expanse of uninterrupted alluvium.

== Geography ==
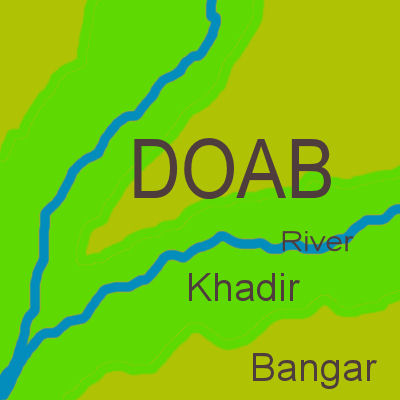
In a doab, khadar (green) lies next to a river, while bangar (olive) has greater elevation and lies further.

The fertile plains span 700,000 km^{2} (270,000 sq mi) across the northern and north-eastern part of the Indian subcontinent. It encompasses northern and eastern India, eastern Pakistan, southern Nepal, and almost all of Bangladesh. Its stretches from the Himalayas in the north to the Vindhyas and Satpura and the Chota Nagpur Plateau in the south, and extends from North East India in the east to the Iranian border in the west. The region is home to many major cities and nearly one-seventh of the world's population. In India, it mainly encompasses the states and union territories of Rajasthan in the west, Punjab, Haryana, Chandigarh, and Delhi in the north west, Uttar Pradesh in the north, Bihar and West Bengal in the east, and Assam in the north east.

The Indo-Gangetic Plain is divided into two drainage basins by the Delhi Ridge, which is a northern extension of the Aravalli Hills. The western part is drained by the Indus, and the eastern part consists of the Ganga–Brahmaputra river systems. The plains encompassed four distinct geographical regions:

- Bhabar: It is a narrow region about 7–15 km (4.3–9.3 mi) wide, located immediately below the foothills of the Himalayas. The stretch is highly porous and is largely made up of stones and rocks carried by the rivers. Most streams disappear underground in the region.
- Terai: It is the second strip that lies next to the Bhabar region. The region is largely made up of new silt deposited by the streams and rivers which reappear. It receives heavy rains for most of the year and consists of thick wet evergreen vegetation.
- Bangar: The third strip consists of older alluvium deposited by the rivers and forms the major fertile region of the flood plains. It also consists of laterite deposits.
- Khadir: The last region encompasses low-lying areas south of the Bangar belt. It is largely composed of new silt carried by the rivers while flowing through the upper part of the plains.

== Hydrography and climate ==
The region is drained by three major river systems and has a high ground water table. Due to its rich water resources and fertile alluvial soil, it is one of the world's most densely populated and intensely farmed areas. The amount of rainfall varies across the plan, with the eastern part of the plains receiving 64–102 cm (25–40 in) of rainfall annually, which reduces when moving towards the west. The eastern part of the plain, which receives heavy rainfall during the monsoon after summer, commonly results in floods and inundations. As the rainfall decreases towards the west, the western region encompasses drier areas such as the Thar desert. However, the northernmost parts of the plain, along the foothills of the Himalayas, receives about 130 cm (50 in) of rainfall. Wheat, barley, and millet are the main crops in the drier western parts of the plain, while rice predominates in the wetter east and northern regions of the plain.

== Sub-divisions ==
The region can be sub-divided into various geographical units such as the Sindh Plains, and the Indus Delta in Pakistan; Rajasthan Plain, and Punjab-Haryana Plain in India and Pakistan, Ganges Plain in India and Bangladesh, Brahmaputra Valley in India, Terai region in Nepal, and the Ganges-Brahmaputra Delta in India and Bangladesh.

=== Sindh Plains ===
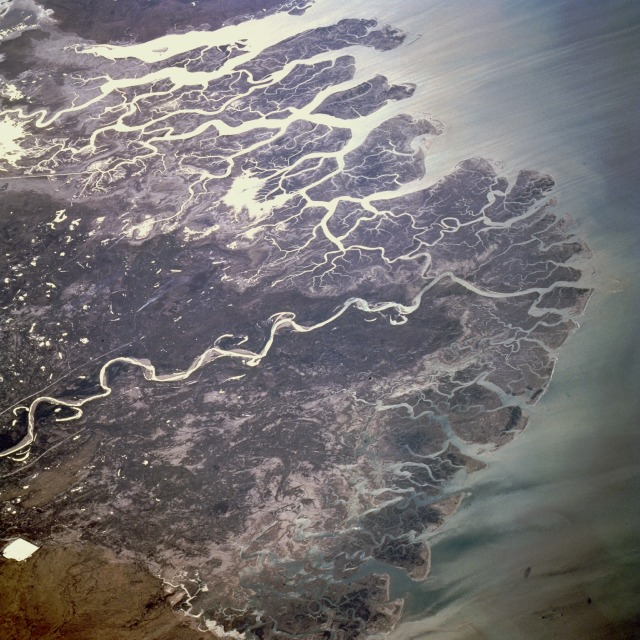
Indus River Delta

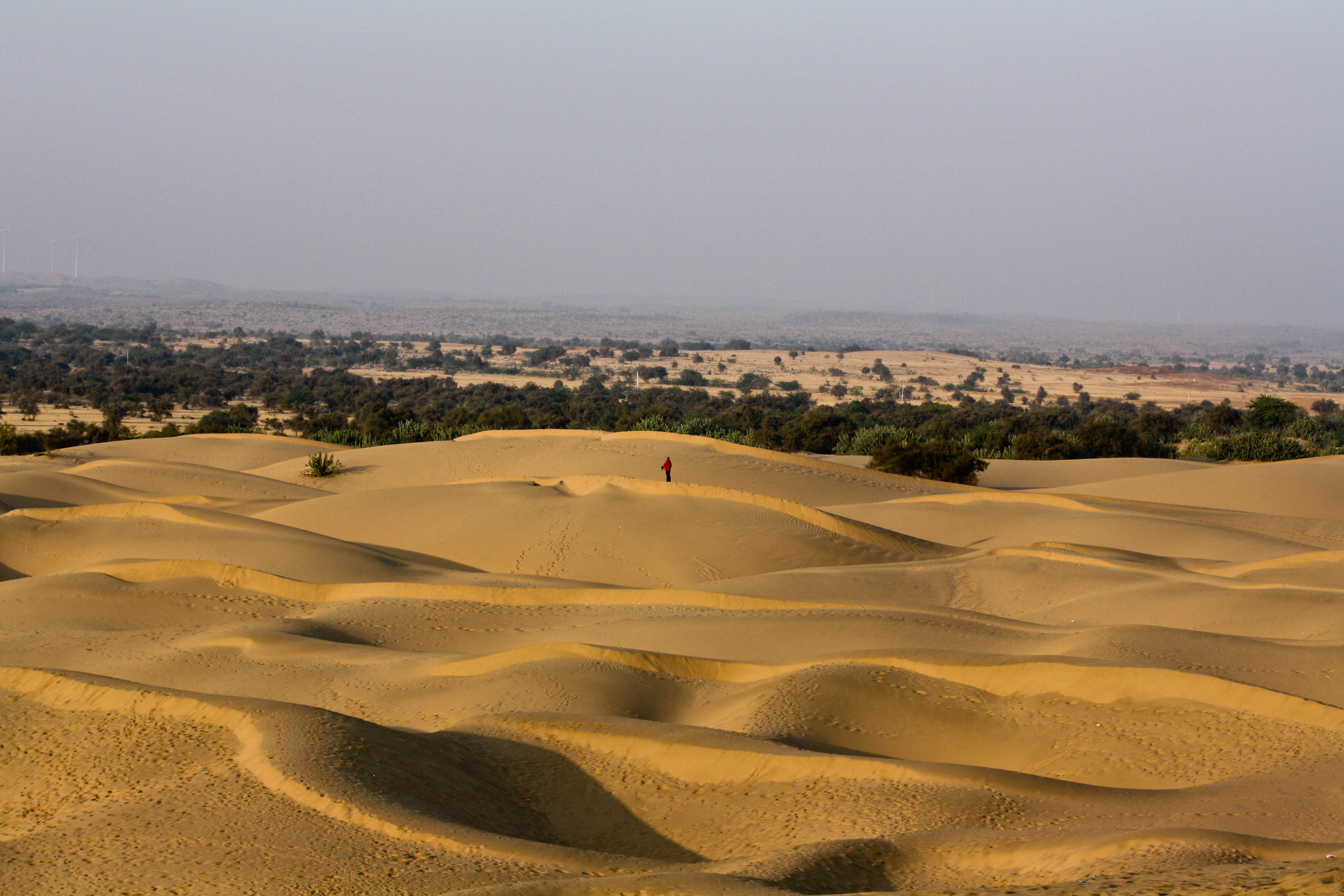
Thar Desert

The Sindh Plains forms the western part of the plains and encompasses the Sindh region of Pakistan to the west of the Thar Desert with the Punjab Plains in the north and the Indus River Delta in the south. The region receives about 13 in (330 mm) of rain annually, mostly from June to September. The economy is largely based on agriculture.

=== Indus Delta ===
The Indus River Delta encompasses the region where the Indus River flows into the Arabian Sea. Most of the delta lies in the southern Sindh province of Pakistan with a small portion in the Kutch region of India. The delta covers an area of about 41,440 km^{2} (16,000 sq mi), and is approximately 210 km (130 mi) across where it meets the sea. The climate is arid, the region receives only 25 and 50 cm (9.8 and 19.7 in) of rainfall. Since the 1940s, the delta has received less water as a result of large-scale irrigation works capturing large amounts of the Indus water before it reaches the delta. The region is home to the largest arid mangrove forests in the world. The population of the active part of the delta was estimated at 900,000 in 2003 with fishing being the major industry.

=== Rajasthan Plain ===
The Rajasthan Plains form the western extreme of the plains in India and is mostly composed of Thar Desert, (Note: The Thar Desert is sometimes classified as a separate geographical entity from the Indo-Gangetic plains due to its distinct topography compared to rest of the plains.) which occupies an area of 200,000 km^{2} (77,000 sq mi) stretching across 650 km (400 mi). About three-fourth of the plains lie in India and rest in Pakistan. In India, two-thirds of the region is part of western Rajasthan, extending to the west of Aravalli Hills and rest form parts of Haryana, Punjab and Gujarat. The region has an average elevation of 325 m (1,066 ft) which reduces from east to west, reaching about 150 m (490 ft) towards the Indus delta and the Rann of Kutch. The western part of the region is covered by shifting sand dunes (dharian) and the eastern part of the region (Rajasthan Bagar) is rocky. The region is largely arid with seasonal streams uch as Luni supporting limited agriculture.

=== Punjab and Haryana Plain ===
The Punjab–Haryana Plain lies to the east and north east of the Rajasthan Plain. It extends for a length of 640 km (400 mi) in a north west to south east orientation till the Aravalli Hills and is about 300 km (190 mi) wide stretching from Haryana in India into Pakistan's Punjab Province. The elevation varies from 275 m (902 ft) in the north to 176 m (577 ft) in the south west. The left quarter of the region is drained mainly by the tributaries of Indus–Ravi, Beas, and Sutlej and the Yamuna waters a small portion on the eastern border. The in-between land which encompasses the city of Delhi, largely consists of no major streams except the seasonal Ghaggar River, and Sahibi River. The region has a humid subtropical climate with dry winters and receives the major part of rainfall during the southwest monsoon between July and September.

=== Ganges Plain ===
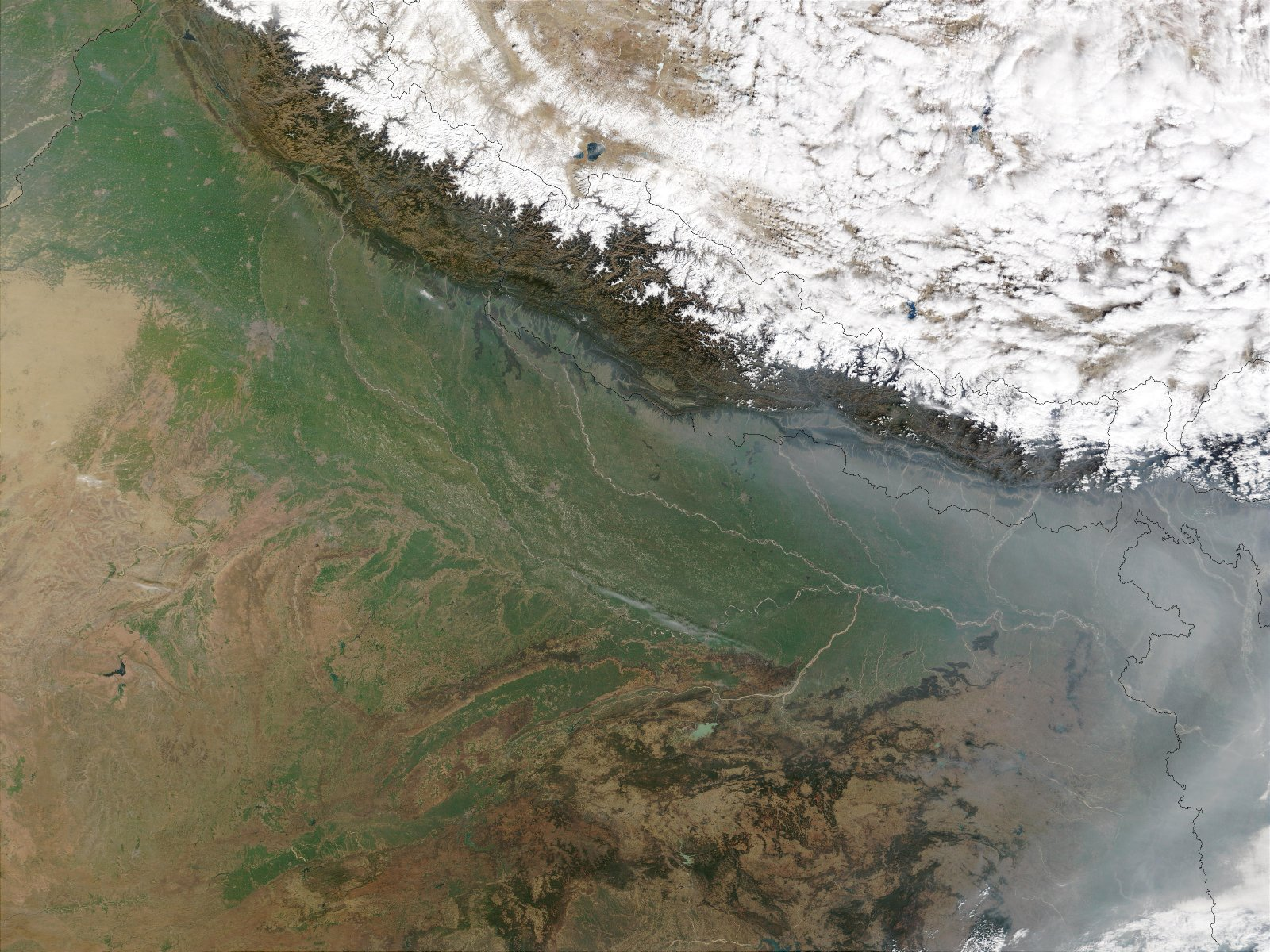
Ganges Plains encompassing the eastern part of the Indo-Gangetic Plain over northern and eastern India.

The Ganges Plain forms the largest sub-unit of the plains and encompasses an area of 375,000 km^{2} (145,000 sq mi) across the states of Uttar Pradesh, Bihar, and West Bengal. The Ganges along with its tributaries such as the Yamuna, Gomti, Ghagara, Gandak, Chambal, Kosi, and Sone drain the region. The various rivers and streams originating from both the Himalayas and the Deccan Plateau contribute to fertile soil in the region. The region gently slopes towards the south east and consists of three regions: Upper, Middle and Lower Ganges Plains. The Upper Ganges Plain stretches 149,000 km^{2} (58,000 sq mi) from the Shivalik range in the north and the Deccan Plateau in the south with the Yamuna River forming the rough western boundary. The region extends 550 km (340 mi) in the north–south direction and is about 380 km (240 mi) wide with an average elevation of 100–300 m (330–980 ft).

The Middle Ganges Plain stretches to the east of the Upper Ganges plain and forms part of eastern Uttar Pradesh and Bihar. It covers an area of 144,000 km^{2} (56,000 sq mi), stretching 330 km (210 mi) in north–south direction and 600 km (370 mi) in the east–west direction. The elevation varies from 100 m (330 ft) in the western boundary to 30 m (98 ft) towards the south east. This plain is largely drained by Ghaghara, Gandak and Kosi rivers. The Lower Ganges Plain includes parts of Bihar, West Bengal and most of Bangladesh. It stretches for 81,000 km^{2} (31,000 sq mi) along a 580 km (360 mi) stretch from the foothills of the Himalayas in the north to the Bay of Bengal in the south, and extends between the Chota Nagpur Plateau in the west and Bangladesh's eastern boundary with India. The average elevation is 50 m (160 ft) along the western boundary.

=== Brahmaputra Valley ===
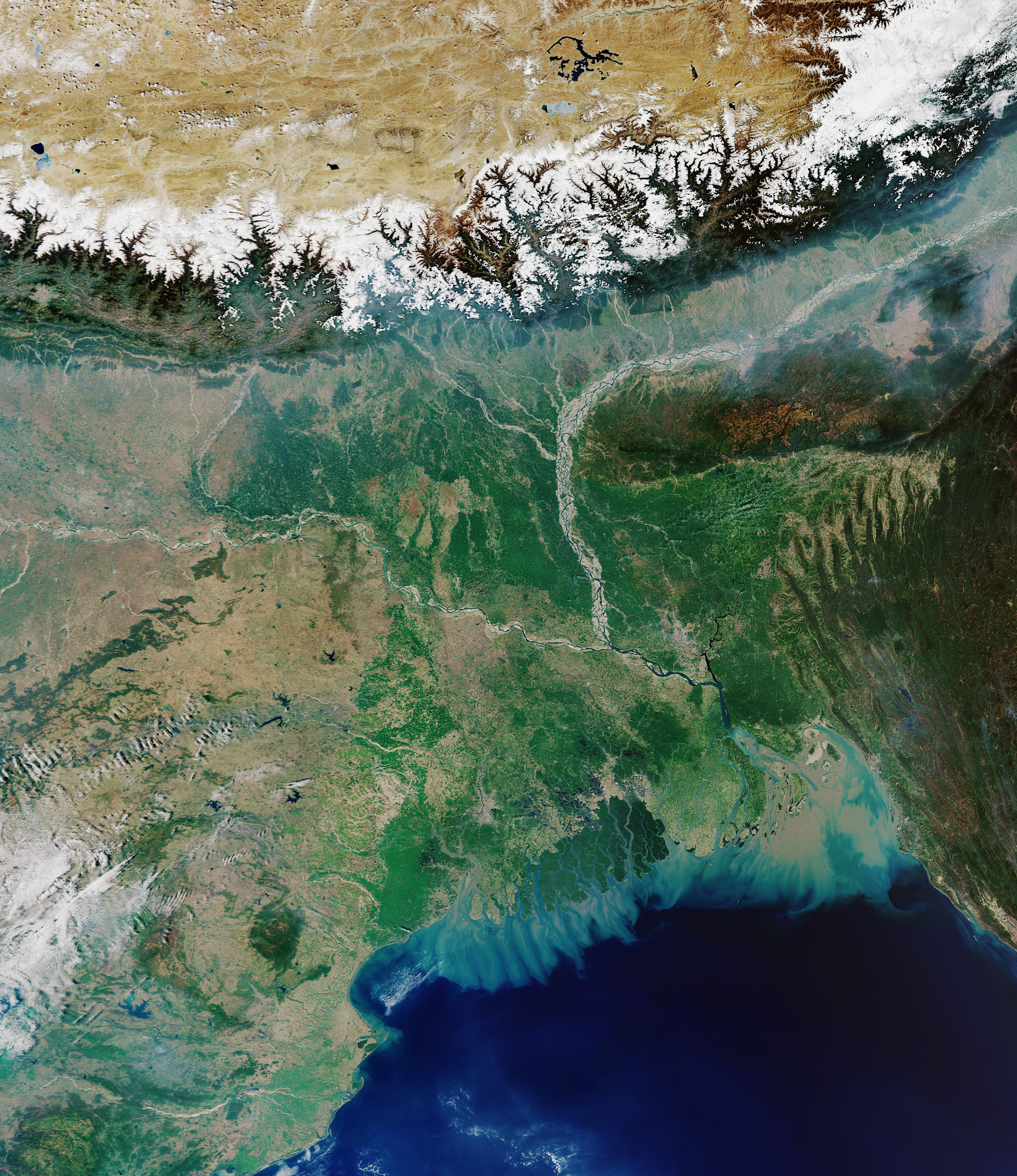
Ganges-Brahmaputra Delta

The Brahmaputra Valley largely covers the Indian state of Assam and is an eastern extension of the plains. It stretches from the Eastern Himalayas in Arunachal Pradesh in the north, to the Garo-Khasi-Jaintia and Mikir Hills in the south. It has the Patkai and Naga Hills to the east and the boundary of the Lower Ganga Plain to the west. The region covers an estimated 56,000 km^{2} (22,000 sq mi) and is watered by Brahmaputra and its tributaries. The elevation varies from 130 m (430 ft) in the east to 30 m (98 ft) in the west.

=== Ganges-Brahmaputra Delta ===
The Ganges-Brahmaputra Delta is the river delta formed by the Ganges and Brahmaputra rivers when they enter the Bay of Bengal. Spread over the Bengal region, consisting of Bangladesh and the Indian state of West Bengal, it is the world's largest river delta and is one of the most fertile regions of the plains. The delta stretches from about 260 km (160 mi) from the Hooghly River in the west to the Meghna River in the east. It encompasses an area of more than 100,000 km^{2} (39,000 sq mi) with two-thirds of it in Bangladesh. It is also one of the most densely populated regions in the world with more than 130 million inhabitants. The area is prone to heavy tropical cyclones. Agriculture and fishing form important part of the economy in the region.

== See also ==
- Ecoregions
  - Lower Gangetic Plains moist deciduous forests
  - Northwestern thorn scrub forest
  - Terai–Duar savanna and grasslands
  - Upper Gangetic Plains moist deciduous forests
- Eastern Coastal Plains
- Western Coastal Plains

== Bibliography ==
- Jadunath Sarkar (1960). Military History of India. Orient Longmans. ISBN 9780861251551.
- Satish Chandra (2006) [First published 1997]. Medieval India: From Sultanat to the Mughals-Delhi Sultanat (1206–1526) (3rd ed.). Har-Anand. ISBN 978-81-241-1064-5.
