= Punjab Plain =

Geographical terrain of the Indian subcontinent

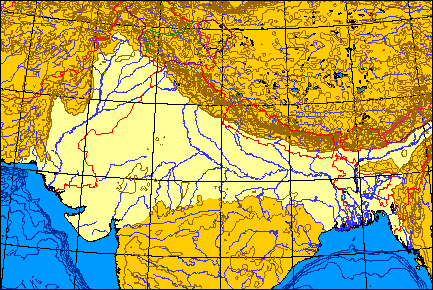
The Punjab Plain forms the western part of the Indo-Gangetic Plain pictured in this image.

The Punjab Plain is a large alluvial plain in northwestern India and eastern Pakistan. The plain includes the Indian states of Punjab and Haryana and the union territory of Delhi, excluding the Shahdara district, and the eastern part of Pakistani Punjab. This plain is around 200–300 meters above mean sea level. The plain is the western part of the Indo-Gangetic Plain, and is bounded by the Sivalik Hills in the north, the Yamuna River in the east, the Thar Desert of Rajasthan to the south, the Ravi River to the northwest and Sutlej River to the southwest. The plain is extensively farmed for cereals and cotton.

== Terminology ==
Doab: The land formed of alluvium in between two rivers known as Doab is found here. 'Doab' is made up of two words — 'do' meaning two and 'ab' meaning water. Similarly 'Punjab', is also made up of two words — 'Punj' meaning five and 'ab' meaning water.

Bār: The upland area between two river valleys in the Punjab plains.

Bangar: The flood plains formed due to deposition of older alluvium is known as Bhangar.

Bet: The flood plains seen here which are formed due to repeated deposition of new alluvium during each flood is known as Bet. The plains are in the plain biomes.

== See also ==
- Punjab Hills
- Hill States of India
