= Ganji Bar =

Region in Punjab, Pakistan

Coordinates: 30°39′50″N 73°06′22″E

Ganji Bar is the lower valley region from the old flow of the rivers Satluj and river Beas or river Hakra to river Ravi in Punjab, Pakistan. There was a high ridge in the middle of Montgomery (Sahiwal), Sahiwal District, old Gogaira district (now Sahiwal Division). This high land runs from northeast to southwest. it was also called Dhaya. Dhaya is a term applied to a slope to the top of the ridge from the low lands at foot. This ridge occupied the middle part of the area and its top was called Ganji Bar. The soul of the ridge was inferior and saline. But on the other hand, it was a view that with a plentiful supply of water and good cultivation the greater position of the land could be brought to bear fair crops. Ganji Bar was the only Bar for its elevated situation, the aridest and naturally barren portion of the Bari Doab. But it was a fact that all this Jungle of Bar was composed of good quality soil which only requires irrigation to produce many crops. Ravi Bar was a dense forest. It is 40 miles from Chatuchak, a village in Gogaira, to Harappa. This entire portion is called Ganji Bar.

== Etymology ==
Ganji Bar was the only famous bar of Bari Doab. Ravi and Bias Bar are the Bars that are not discussed by the local researchers. Ganji Bar begins from the Twin Bridge (Jorian Pull), a stop before Akhterabad town on Lahore- Multan road. According to Dr. Harkerat Singh, there is a ridge of 7 to 8 miles in width in the middle of Bar. It is uncultivated, it looks like a barren land. Karer is the plant mostly found here. This is in the middle of Bar and goes from east to the south throughout the Bar. This was the reason, it is called Ganji (Bare) bar as it has a head without cultivation like a human head without hair. This way it is called Ganji Bar.

But another scholar called it Ganji as it is a word derived from the Persian word Ganj which means treasure. According to him, this tract of land was very rich, only waiting for proper sources of water. As the British made settlement here in the 2nd decade of the 20th century, it became the food basket of India. It was a land rich in cotton crop. So it was named Ganji Bar. This opinion is more reliable as it tells the real meanings of Ganji.

== Satgarah ==
Another place in Ganji Bar is Satgarah. It is also described in 'Ain-Akbari'. It was a projecting point of the high bank which marks the limits of widening of the Ravi on the east. The name means seven castles, but these no longer exist. There is an old brick fort and several isolated mounds. Which marks the site of an ancient city. This old city of Ganji Bar was the center of politics during Mughal rule. Sardar Mir Chakar Rind made it the capital of his rule in this area. Mughal emperor Humayun got refuge here.

== Important personalities ==
The formidable Mallians of Sandal and Ganji Bars ferociously fought Alexander, on his way back home, along the river Ravi. Alexander himself was struck with a near-fatal arrow by the Mallians in Multan.

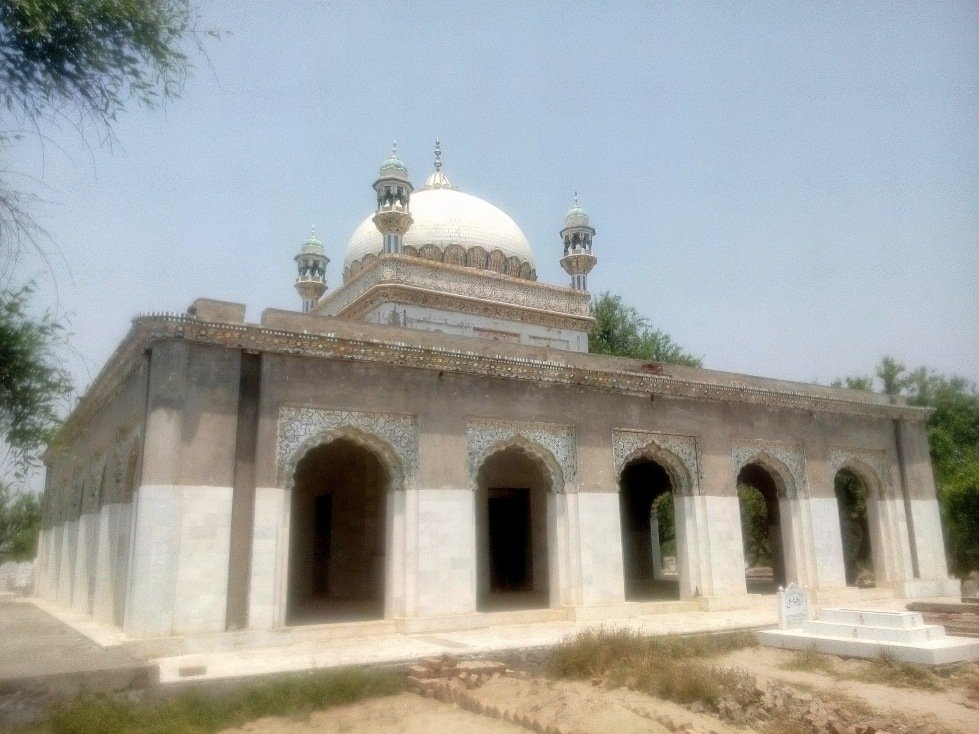
Tomb of Rai Ahmad Khan Kharal in Jhamra

The Ganji Bar was home to Rai Ahmed Khan Kharal who fought the British colonialists in the 19th century.

Baba Farid (1188 – 1266), Sufi saint, the pioneer of the Punjabi literary tradition, after shifting from royalty-infested Delhi to Pakpattan (Ajodhan) lived on the borders of Nili and Ganji Bars. He, in his couplets, employs a blend of Multani and Lehndi dialects of the Punjabi language.

We find yet another poet, Ali Haidar Multani, whose classical verses carry the spontaneity and sweetness of folk songs.

Mian Mohammad Bakhsh who did not live in Ganji Bar, too, had a fascination for it: ‘deer munching your grass in the Bar beware; the hunter is all set to breathe down your neck'.

Baba Talib Jatoi, a Punjabi language poet from Ganji Bar.

== Role in War of Independence 1857 ==
Many people participated in the War of Independence 1857 in the Bar area including one of its leaders from the Ganji Bar region Rai Ahmad Khan Kharal. District headquarter Gogaira was the center of the war. It is situated in Ganji bar. Other cities of Ganji Bar were Harappa, Chichawatni, and Kamalia. When British annexed Punjab in 1849, the District Headquarters of this area was Pakpattan. It consisted of the present Sahiwal division. Now it consists of three districts Sahiwal, Okara and Pakpattan. After defeating Sikhs, the British made Gogaira its District headquarter which was on the southern bank of River Ravi. It was the root of communication through River Ravi and road along with Ravi from Lahore to Multan and Karachi. It was also on the military road from Lahore to Multan. It was called Kakhan Wali Sarak (Road of Straws). It is about 30 miles from Sahiwal to Ravi. In 1855 twenty villages were included in the Gogaira district from Lahore. It had five Tehsils Syed wala, Gogaira, Harappa, Pakpattan, and Hujra with 1446 villages and a total area of 1138620 acres. Headquarters of the District were shifted to the village Sahiwal and it became Montgomery in 1865 after the name of Governor Punjab Sir R Montgomery.

== Bars ==
Bar in the Punjabi language means a threshold, an outer space, an area away from the human settlement, a barrier between populated area and wild forest, a natural jungle, etc. The dominant culture of this region is Bari Culture and native language spoken is Punjabi, spoken with various dialects. After the introduction of the canal system, many lands of this area were granted to people mostly belong to various districts of Eastern Punjab.
