= Sandal Bar =

Region in Punjab, Pakistan

Sandal Bar Jungle Bar
- Geographic region of Punjab
- Faisalabad Division
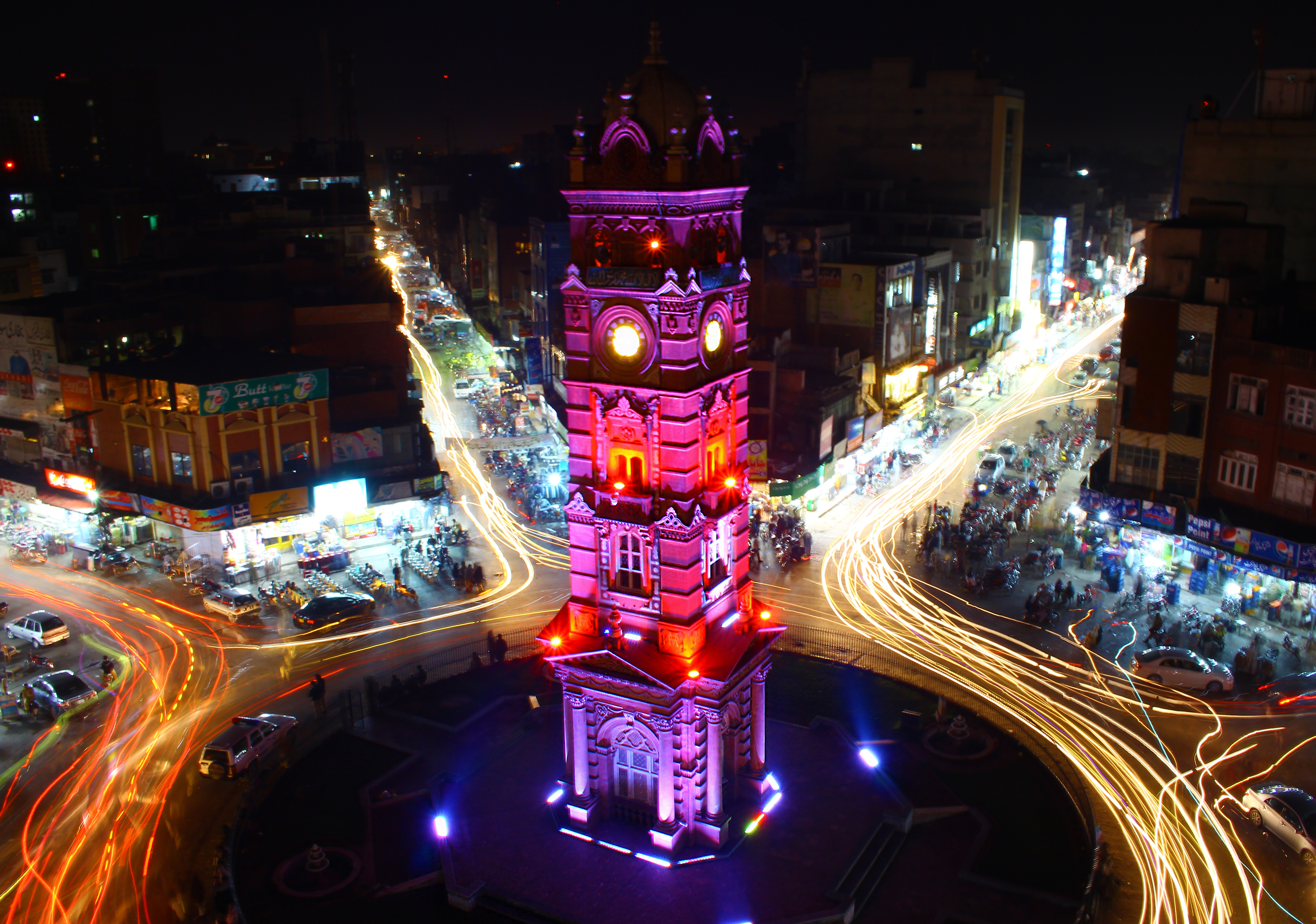
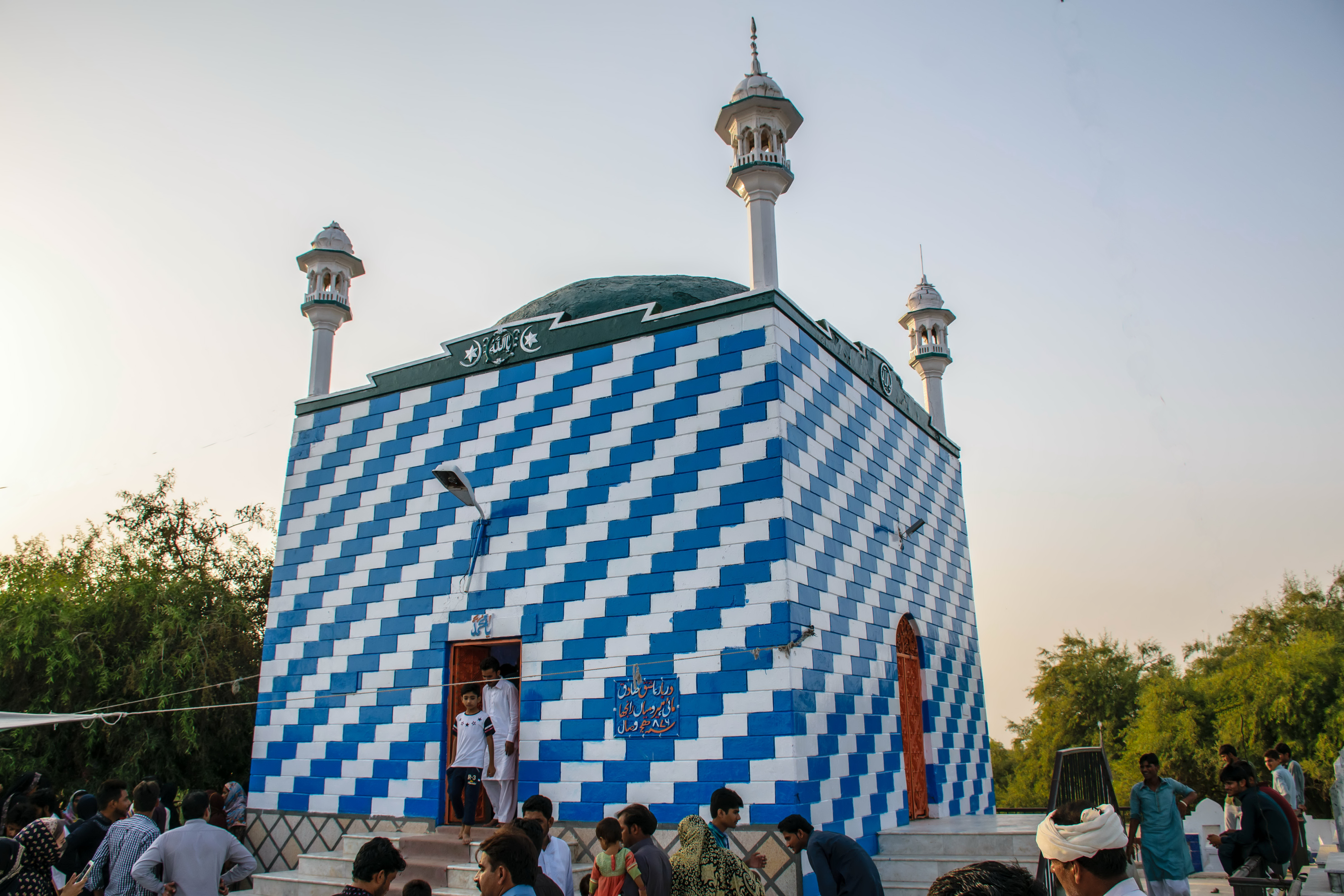
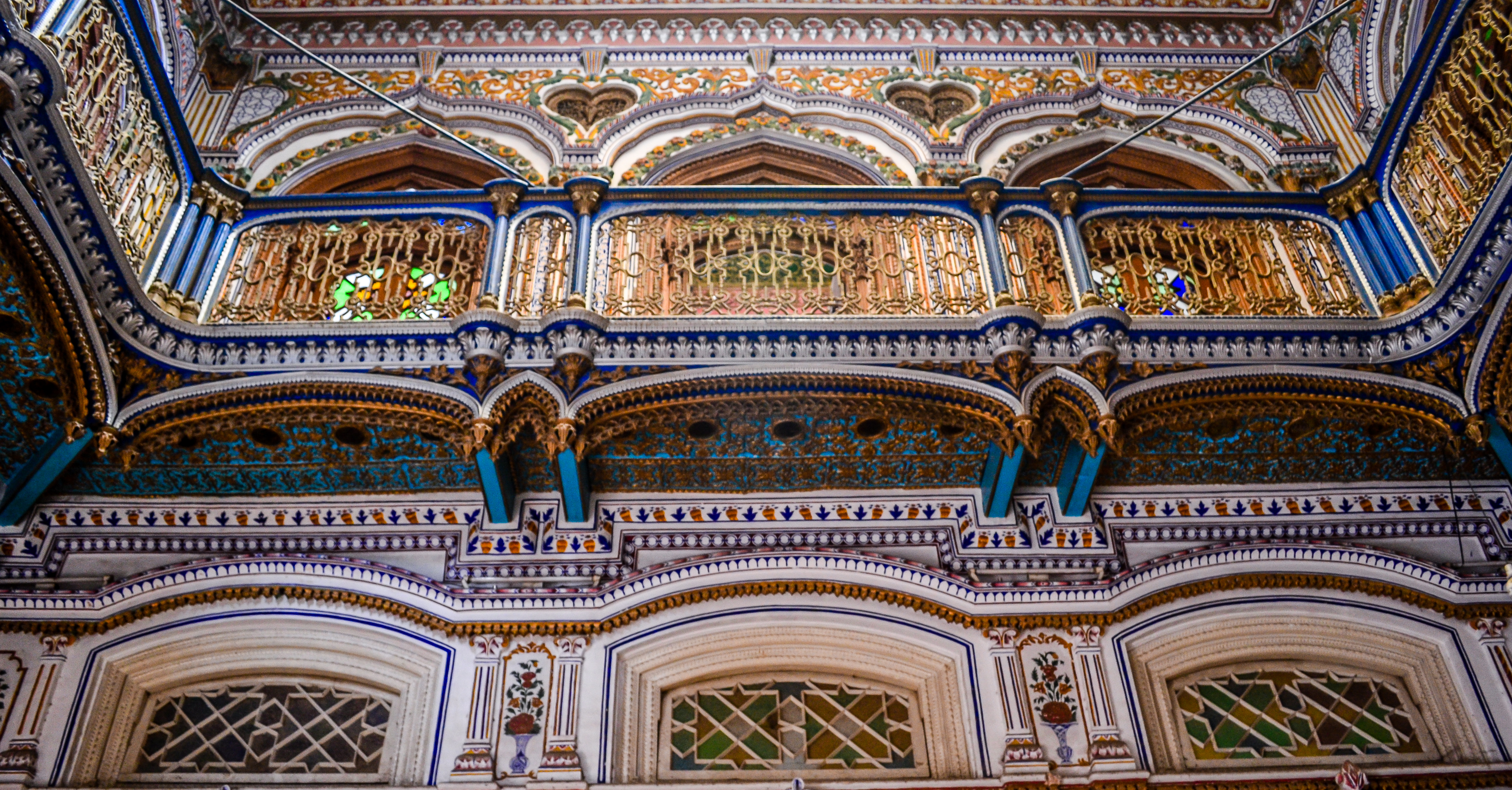
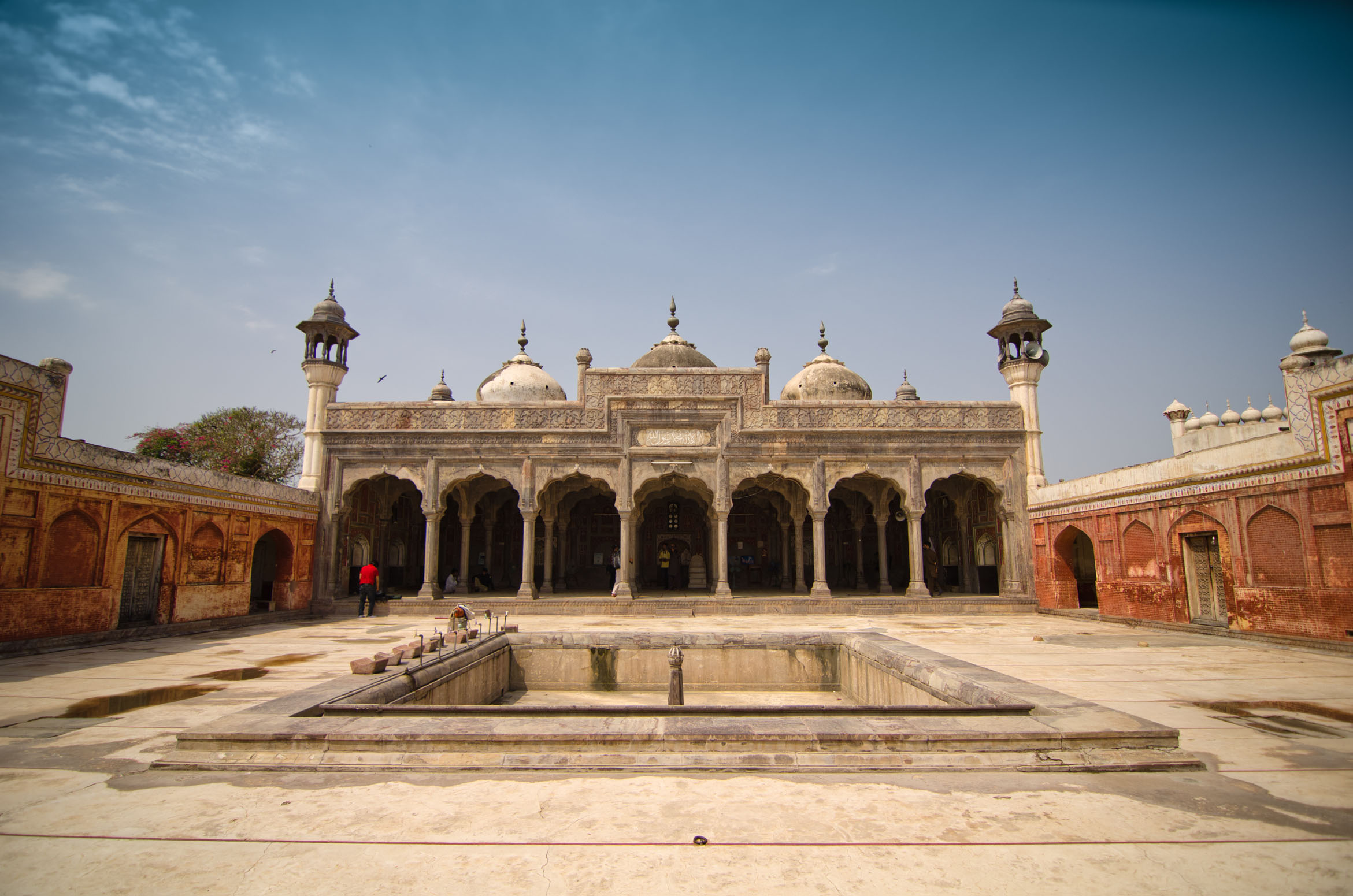
- Clockwise from top: Clock Tower, Faisalabad, Heer and Ranjha's Tomb, Jhang, Omar Hayat Mahal Chiniot , Shahi Mosque Chiniot.

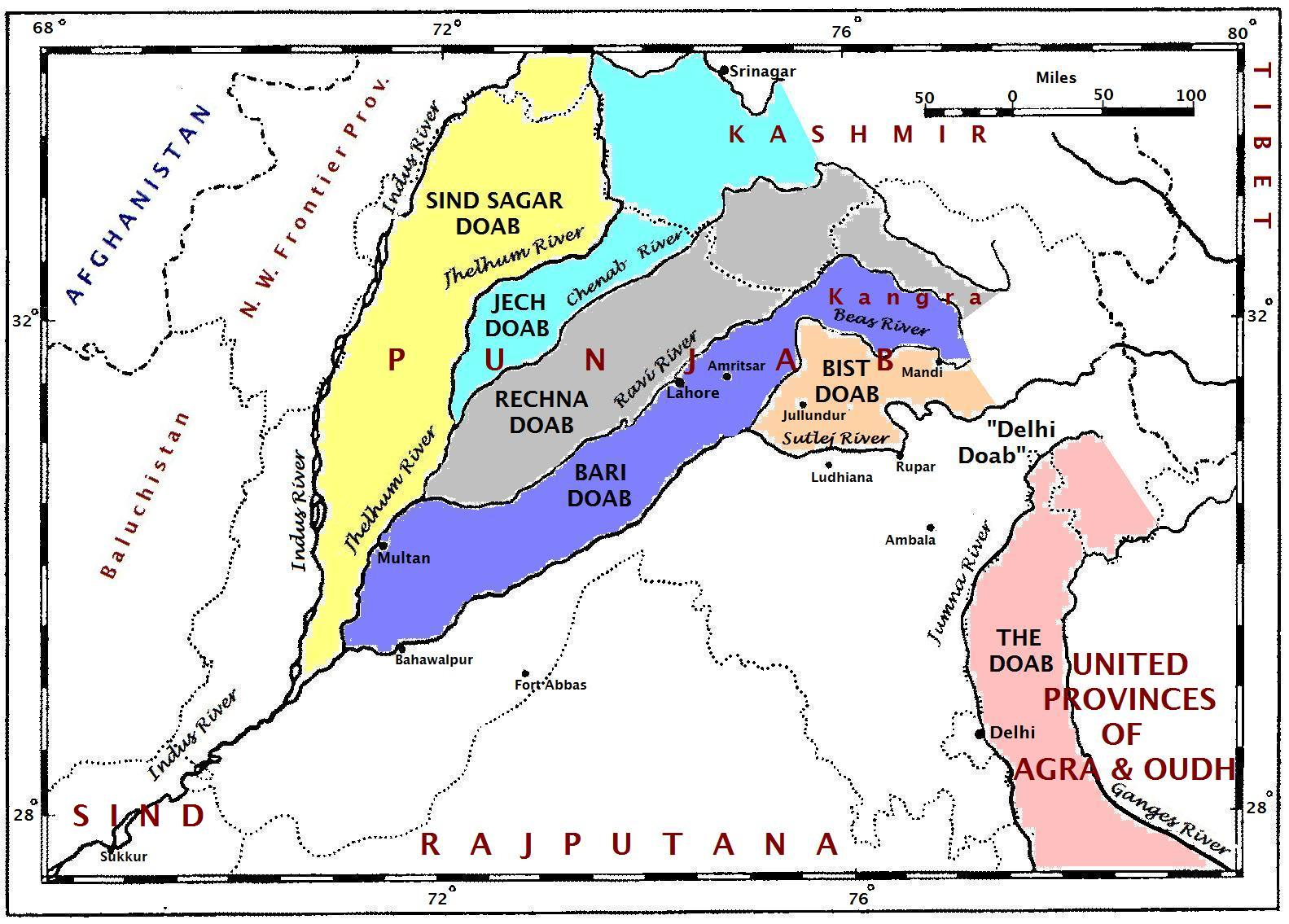
- The Sandal bar falls within the lower half of Rechna Doab (grey colour) in this map
- Country: Pakistan
- Province: (Punjab, Pakistan) Punjab
- District(s): Faisalabad District; Jhang District; Toba Tek Singh District; Chiniot District
- Largest cities: Faisalabad; Jhang; Toba Tek Singh; Chiniot
- Named for: Sandal Bhatti

Area
  - Total: 17,917 km^{2} (6,918 sq mi)

Population (2023)
  - Total: 16,228,526
  - Density: 905.71/km^{2} (2,345.8/sq mi)

Languages
  - Official: Punjabi
- Time zone: UTC+05:00 (PKT)
- Largest airport: Faisalabad Airport
- Website: faisalabad.punjab.gov.pk

Sandal Bar (Punjabi: ساندل بار), also known as the Jungle Bar, is the section of the Bar region in western Punjab in Pakistan and is located between the rivers Ravi and Chenab, and comprises the southern part of Rechna Doab.

== Etymology ==
Sandal Bar is named after Sandal, grandfather of the 16th-century Punjabi chieftain Dulla Bhatti who, according to the popular folklores, led a revolt against the Mughal rule in the Sandal Bar during the reign of Akbar.

== Geography ==
It corresponds to the present-day Faisalabad, Jhang, Toba Tek Singh and Chiniot districts in Pakistani Punjab.

== History ==
=== Medieval era ===
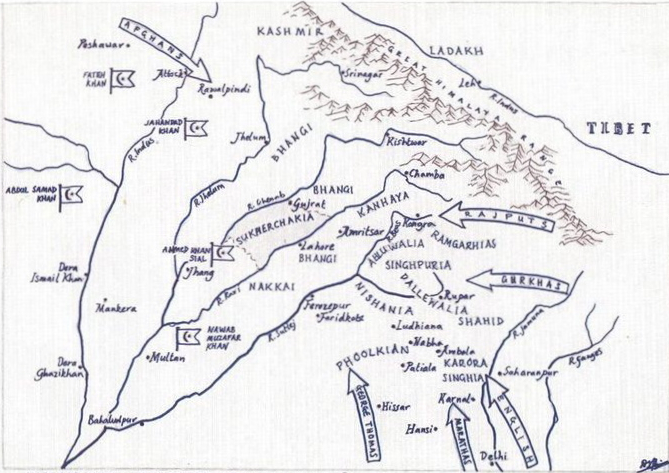
Map of Punjab in 1780, depicting Sial capital of Jhang in the Rachna Doab.

Jhang has been historically the stronghold of the Punjabi Sial tribe for centuries. The 13th Sial chief, Walidad Khan, established a strong regional state in the early-18th century following the decline of the Mughal Empire, which was supported by a large agricultural base along river Chenab. He gradually gained control of the lower Rachna Doab, including the cities of Chiniot, Pindi Bhattian, Jhang and Mankera. The next chief, Inayatullah Khan (r. 1747–1787), was a successful general who won 22 battles against Bhangi Misl and the Multan chiefs. His son, Sultan Kabir Khan was a mild ruler and his reign was peaceful. In 1798, he abdicated in the favour of his son, Ahmed Khan, who proved to be the last Sial ruler.

=== Sikh invasions and rule ===
In 1803, the Sikh ruler, Ranjit Singh, sent his agents to Jhang to demand tribute from Ahmed Khan. Upon his refusal Ranjit Singh marched with his Khalsa Army to Jhang. Ahmed Khan collected a force consisting of Sials, Kharrals and Bharwanas, but was defeated, ultimately being forced to pay a tribute of 60,000 rupees per year. Ranjit Singh annexed the Sial capital of Jhang in 1807, on the pretext that Ahmad Khan Sial was making an alliance with Muzaffar Khan Sadozai of Multan and had signed a secret treaty with the latter. However, Ahmed Khan seized control of Jhang again in 1808 with the help of Pathans of Multan. Ranjit Singh again invaded Sial-ruled territories in 1817 while going on campaign against the Nawab of Multan, and defeated the Sials. The Sial rule came to end in 1818, and Ahmed Khan was awarded a small jagir by Ranjit Singh worth 12,000 rupees in the Amritsar District as compensation.

=== British annexation ===
At the conclusion of the Second Anglo-Sikh War in 1849, the entire Punjab region became administered as Punjab province, firstly by the East India Company and after 1858 as part of the British Raj.

=== War of Independence of 1857 ===
On July 8, the British arrested a large number of Johiya tribesmen, women and children after they refused to pay the heavy taxes. When Ahmad Khan Kharal received the news, he planned to break into the Gugera Jail and rescue the innocent people imprisoned there. With help of his Baghela, Fatyana, Wattoo and Kathia allies, Ahmad Khan Kharal attacked the jail around 26 July. According to British records, 17 prisoners were killed, 33 were injured and 18 fled; native accounts held that 145 prisoners died and over a hundred East India Company troops were also killed. The British arrested Ahmad Khan Kharal but released him due to the pressure from local tribesmen and insufficient evidence available to charge him. Kharal continued resisting against the British after being released.

In order to arrest Ahmad Khan Kharal, Berkley attacked Jhamra but was unsuccessful although he imprisoned 20 civilians including Ahmad Khan Kharal's youngest son Bala Khan Kharal. The British also took with them a large number of cattle. Ahmad Khan Kharal with the help of Baghela, Kathia, Wattoo, Fatayana and Joiya tribesmen started a guerrilla campaign against the British. According to the Punjab government records, the rebels numbered 20,000 to 30,000 men at their height. Colonial official John Cave-Browne wrote that these rebels took refuge in thick jungles and grass and attacked in groups of 3,000–5,000 guerrillas. The sound of drum beating was the sign that they would attack. The connection of Jhang to Lahore was completely cut on account of their actions. Ahmad Khan Kharal planned a major assault on Gugera with other tribal leaders in a secret meeting but the information was leaked by Sarfraz Kharal of Kamalia to the British. The British prepared themselves to face the upcoming assault and when the rebels attacked they were repulsed with heavy losses.

Ahmad Khan Kharal with his companions retreated to the jungles of Gashkori and continued the guerrilla warfare. The British received news about Ahmad Khan Kharal's presence in the jungles of Gashkori and a force under Captain Black was sent there. The detachment succeeded in killing Ahmad Khan Kharal while he was offering afternoon prayers on 21 September 1857. Many of his close companions, such as his deputy Sarang Khan Kharal, were also killed in this engagement.

Acknowledging the profound impact of the fallen chief, Lieutenant N.W. Elphinstone wrote in his official report:

This expedition, though attended with severe loss on our side, thus ended in irreparable disaster for to the insurgents. Ahmad Khan (Kharral) had been chief instigator of the movement; his reputation for success in former insurrections was considerable, and his influence over the tribes on the Ravee unbounded.

Murad Fatyana, a trusted associate of Ahmad Khan Kharal, took revenge of Ahmad Khan's killing and killed Lord Berkley alongside fifty Anglo-Indian troops in a successful attack two days after Kharal's death. The rebellion continued until it was put down in 1858 by the British reinforcements.

=== British Raj ===
Until the late-19th century it was sparsely populated, when it was brought under irrigation after the establishment of Chenab Colony (Lyallpur) in 1892.

In the 1880s, the Punjab government began an irrigation scheme to cultivate large tracts of western Punjab through the creation of canal colonies. The Chenab colony was the largest of these colonisation projects, and covered the entirety of the Lyallpur District. Popham Young, the colonisation officer, managing the project, identified the site of the current city to establish headquarters for the colony.

== Notable people ==
- Rai Ahmad Khan Kharal
- Murad Fatyana
- Inayatullah Khan Sial
