= Kathia =

Muslim tribe of Pakistani Punjab

Kathia, Punjab
- Jāti: Rajput
- Religions: Islam
- Languages: Punjabi
- Country: Pakistan
- Region: Punjab
- Ethnicity: Punjabi
- Family names: Yes

The Kathia is a Muslim tribe of Pakistani Punjab. Many leaders of Kathia tribe were main participants in the Indian Rebellion of 1857 led by Rai Ahmad Khan Kharal.

== Present Circumstances ==
Today, they are mainly scattered around the banks of River Ravi and Chenab. Here they are politically active and contest on different seats of National and Provincial Assemblies. Even today their main source of income depends on agricultural and cattle farming and are regarded as respectable Zamindars of their areas.

Ghulam Farid Kathia is a Pakistani politician who had been a member of the National Assembly of Pakistan from 2008 to 2013.

Muhammad Qamar Hayat Kathia, son of Mian Khizar Hayat Kathia, was born on August 24, 1975, at Tehsil Shorkot, District Jhang. He obtained the degree of lora lehson. in 2002 from Baha-ud-Din Zakariya University, Multan. An agriculturist, who served as Nazim, Union Council No.112, Jhang during 2001–2002. He has been elected as Member, Provincial Assembly of the Punjab in General Elections 2002; and is functioning as Parliamentary Secretary since January 22, 2004.

Muhammad Asif, son of Mr Zulfiqar Ali, was born on February 18, 1963, at Shorkot City and graduated in 1984 from University of the Punjab, Lahore. He remained Nazim Union Council Jhang during 2003–04. An agriculturist, who has been elected as Member Provincial Assembly of the Punjab in General Elections 2018.

Irfan Ali Kathia, Director General PDMA Lahore also worked as Deputy Commissioner Bahawalpur

Khizar Hayat Kathia, X-Member District Govt Toba Tek Singh

Shahid Abbas Kathia, Metropolitan Corporation Lahore (MCL) Chief Officer

Tariq Mehmood Kathia, Brigadier Pakistan Army Hilal-e-Imtiaz (Military) Sitara-e-Imtiaz

Fareed Abbas Kathia, candidate for Provisional Assembly from PPP 2024 From Bhussi kathian PP123

Iqbal Hussain Kathia, IB, Federal Government

Ali Abbas Kathia, Assistant Conservator of Forests (AC Forest), Khanaiwal, Punjab, Sub-Division Forest officer Gujranwala (Also worked as Sub Division Forest officer Narowal, Sialkot )

Mrs Ali Abbas Kathia, Assistant Conservator of Forests (AC Forest), Punjab

Muhammad Afzal Kathia, Fesco Executive Engineer Faisalabad

Wajahat Hassan Kathia, Aircraft Design Engineer, Zhejiang Loong Town Intelligence, Shanghai

Shan Ul Haq, Superintendent Inland Revenue, FBR Pakistan

Zulfiqar Ali Kathia, SDO Wapda Kamalia City

M ALi zain Kathia, SDO, Wapda, Punjab

Ghulam Hussain Kathia, ADLR Land Record Shorkot, Pirmahal

Amir Kathia, Assistant Conservator of Forests (AC Forest), Punjab

Muhammad Ali kathia Advocate, Pirmahal Bar

Saqib Abbas Kathia, Advoacte, Kamalia Bar, President Kamalia Bar

Dr Hassan Kathia, Shaikh Zayed Hospital, lahore

Hassan Kathia, Superintendent jail, Punjab

Dr Mujahid Kathia, Lahore
