= Gondal (clan) =

Jat clan

Gondal is a Punjabi Jat clan from Gujrat, Sargodha and Mandi Bahauddin districts of Punjab, Pakistan; it is also present in Punjab, India. The Gondal Bar is named after them.

== History ==
In the early 18th century, Gondals resided in the tract of land between Jhelum and Chenab, roughly from present-day Shahpur to Gujrat. In his Nadir Shah di Vaar, Gondals are mentioned by the poet Najabat, who witnessed the invasion of Nadir Shah in 1739, to be one of the several Punjabi tribes who confronted the Persian army under their leaders Dilloo and Saidoo and did not allow it to pass through Gondal Bar, hence saving it from the devastation which fell upon Gakhars, Khattars and Ghebas:

Original Punjabi
دو باریں راہ نیں گوندلاں، لاجپوتاں آہے
تے دلو تے سیدو وڈھیاں آسمانیں سائے
اوہناں ہمت کیتی سورمیاں چک سیوں لنگھائے
Roman transliteration

dobarein rah nee Gondlan Lajputan aahay

tay Dillu tay Saidu waddhian asmaneen sa-ay

ohna himmat keetee soormian chik seeon langha-ay

English translation

Alongside the road were the Gondal Rajputs,

Dilloo and Saidoo had risen to the sky,

[Their] sharp lances pierced the hearts and made the troops shriek

== Notable people with this surname ==
- Nazar Muhammad Gondal (born 1950), Pakistani politician
- Usman Gondal (born 1987), Pakistani footballer
- Khalid Mahmood Gondal (born 1949), Pakistani civil servant
