= Rai Usman Khan =

Pakistani politician

Rai Muhamamd Usman Khan Kharal

Member of the Provincial Assembly of the Punjab
- In office 29 May 2013 – 31 May 2018

Personal details
- Born: 9 September 1972 (age 54) Faisalabad
- Party: Pakistan Muslim League (Nawaz)

Rai Muhamamd Usman Khan Kharal (born 9 September 1972) is a Pakistani politician who was a Member of the Provincial Assembly of the Punjab, from May 2013 to May 2018.

== Early life and education ==
He was born on 9 September 1972 in Faisalabad.

He has a degree of Bachelor of Arts which he obtained in 1995 from University of the Punjab.

== Political career ==
He was elected to the Provincial Assembly of the Punjab as an independent candidate from Constituency PP-56 (Faisalabad-VI) in the 2013 Pakistani general election. He joined Pakistan Muslim League (N) in May 2013.
