= Rai Mansab Ali Khan (politician, born 1948) =

Pakistani politician

Member of the Provincial Assembly of the Punjab
- In office 29 May 2013 – 31 May 2018

Personal details
- Born: 18 August 1948 (age 78) Multan
- Party: Pakistan Muslim League (N)

Rai Mansab Ali Khan is a Pakistani politician who was a Member of the Provincial Assembly of the Punjab, from 2002 to 2007 and again from May 2013 to May 2018.

== Early life and education ==
He was born on 18 August 1948 in Multan.

He has a degree of Bachelor of Arts and a degree of Bachelor of Laws which he obtained in 1982 from Government Wilayat Hussain College in Multan.

== Political career ==
He was elected to the Provincial Assembly of the Punjab as a candidate of Pakistan Peoples Party (PPP) from Constituency PP-202 (Multan-IX) in the 2002 Pakistani general election. He received 27,260 votes and defeated a candidate of Pakistan Muslim League (N) (PML-N). From 2002 to 2007, he served as Parliamentary Secretary for Cooperatives.

He ran for the seat of the Provincial Assembly of the Punjab as a candidate of Pakistan Muslim League (Q) from Constituency PP-202 (Multan-IX) in the 2008 Pakistani general election but was unsuccessful. He received 16,693 votes and lost the seat to a candidate of PPP.

He was re-elected to the Provincial Assembly of the Punjab as a candidate of PML-N from Constituency PP-202 (Multan-IX) in the 2013 Pakistani general election.
