= Dulla Bhatti =

Punjabi folk hero

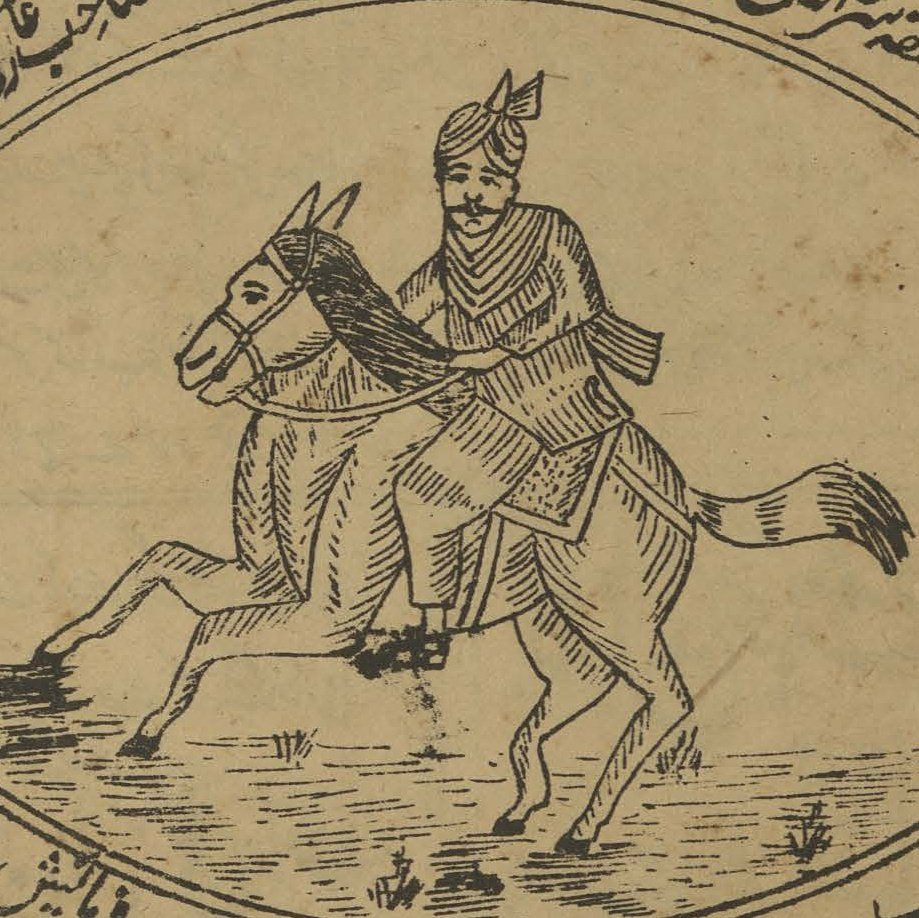
Equestrian depiction of Dulla Bhatti from a qissa.

Rai Abdullah Khan Bhatti popularly known through his moniker Dulla or Dullah Bhatti, is a folk hero in Punjabi folklore. He is said to have led a revolt against Mughal rule during the reign of Emperor Akbar. Dulla Bhatti is entirely absent from the recorded history of the time, and the only evidence of his existence comes from Punjabi folk songs. The deeds of Bhatti are recounted in folklore and took the form of social banditry. According to Ishwar Dayal Gaur, although he was "the trendsetter in peasant insurgency in medieval Punjab", he remains "on the periphery of Punjab's historiography".

== Folklore ==
Abdullah Bhatti was a Punjabi Muslim Rajput of the Bhatti tribe. Abdullah Bhatti lived at Pindi Bhattian in Punjab, and came from a family of hereditary local rural chiefs of the zamindar class. Both his father, Farid, and his grandfather, variously called Bijli or Sandal, (Note: Surinder Singh's analysis of regional folklore names Bhatti's grandfather as Sandal and suggests the possibility, given the influence that he had in the region, that the area of Sandal Bar is named after him.) were executed for opposing the new and centralised land revenue collection scheme imposed by the Mughal emperor Akbar. Dulla was born to Ladhi four months after the death of his father.

Akbar's son, Shaikhu (later known as Jahangir), was born on the same day. Advised by his courtiers that Shaikhu's future bravery and success would be ensured if the child was fed by a woman whose own son was born on same day (which happens to be Dhulla Bhatti), Akbar gave that responsibility to Ladhi despite her connection to a man who had rebelled against the Mughal throne. This decision appears to have its basis in realpolitik: Akbar perceived that Ladhi was resentful, that Bhatti might become the third generation of rebels and that Akbar's royal favour might offset this.

A part of the royal patronage was that Bhatti attended school. Although, at that time, unaware of the fate of his ancestors, he refused to accept the strictures that were intended to mould him into a good citizen and objected to being a part of an establishment that was designed to produce elites. He left to engage instead in childish mischief-making.

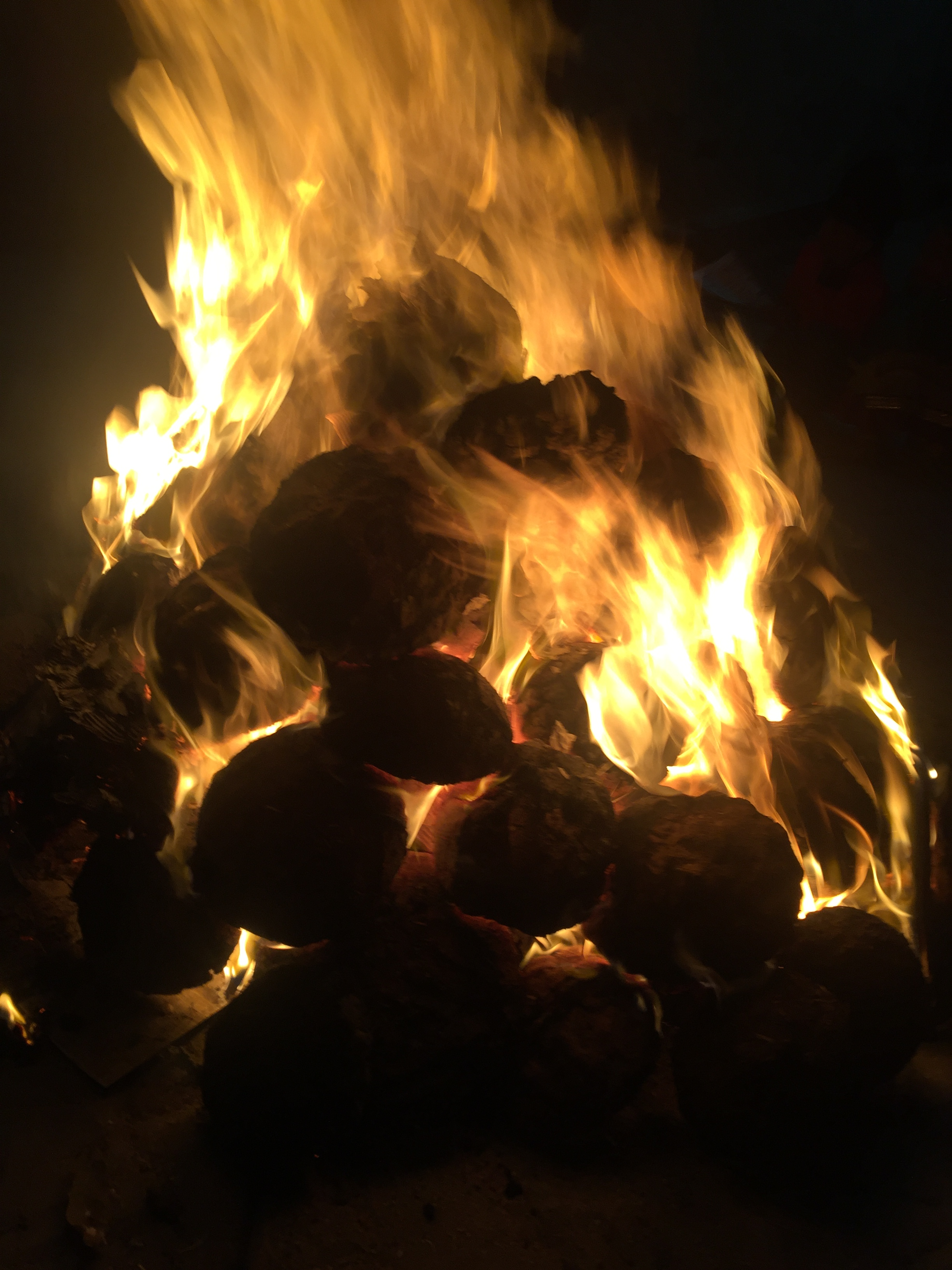
Lohri bonfire, it is celebrated in the wider Punjab region in remembrance of Dulla Bhatti

A chance remark led to Ladhi having to explain the fate of Farid and Bijli to her son. Gaur says that this caused his general anti-authoritarian, rebellious nature to "crystallise" with the Akbar regime as its target, although not as a means of revenge specifically for the deaths of his relatives but in the wider sense of the sacrifices made by rural people generally. Bhatti saw this, says Gaur, as a "peasant class war".

=== Banditry ===
Bhatti's class war took the form of social banditry, taking from the rich and giving to the poor. (Note: Social bandit is a concept devised by Eric Hobsbawm, defined as "peasant outlaws whom the lord and state regard as criminals, but who remain within peasant society, and are considered by their people as heroes, as champions.") Folklore gave him a legendary status for preventing girls from being abducted and sold as slaves. He arranged marriages for them and provided their dowries.

In one incident, Prince Salim crossed over into Dulla Bhatti’s territory during a hunt. Releasing him, Bhatti argued that his conflict was with the emperor, not his son. On another occasion, it is also said that Akbar got away from his guards and was apprehended by the soldiers of Dulla Bhatti. Akbar posed as the Mughal court jester when brought before Dulla Bhatti, which allowed him to be freed.

His efforts may have influenced Akbar's decision to pacify Guru Arjan Dev, and through Guru Arjan Dev's influence the people of Bari Doab, by exempting the area from the requirement to provide land revenues.

=== Death ===
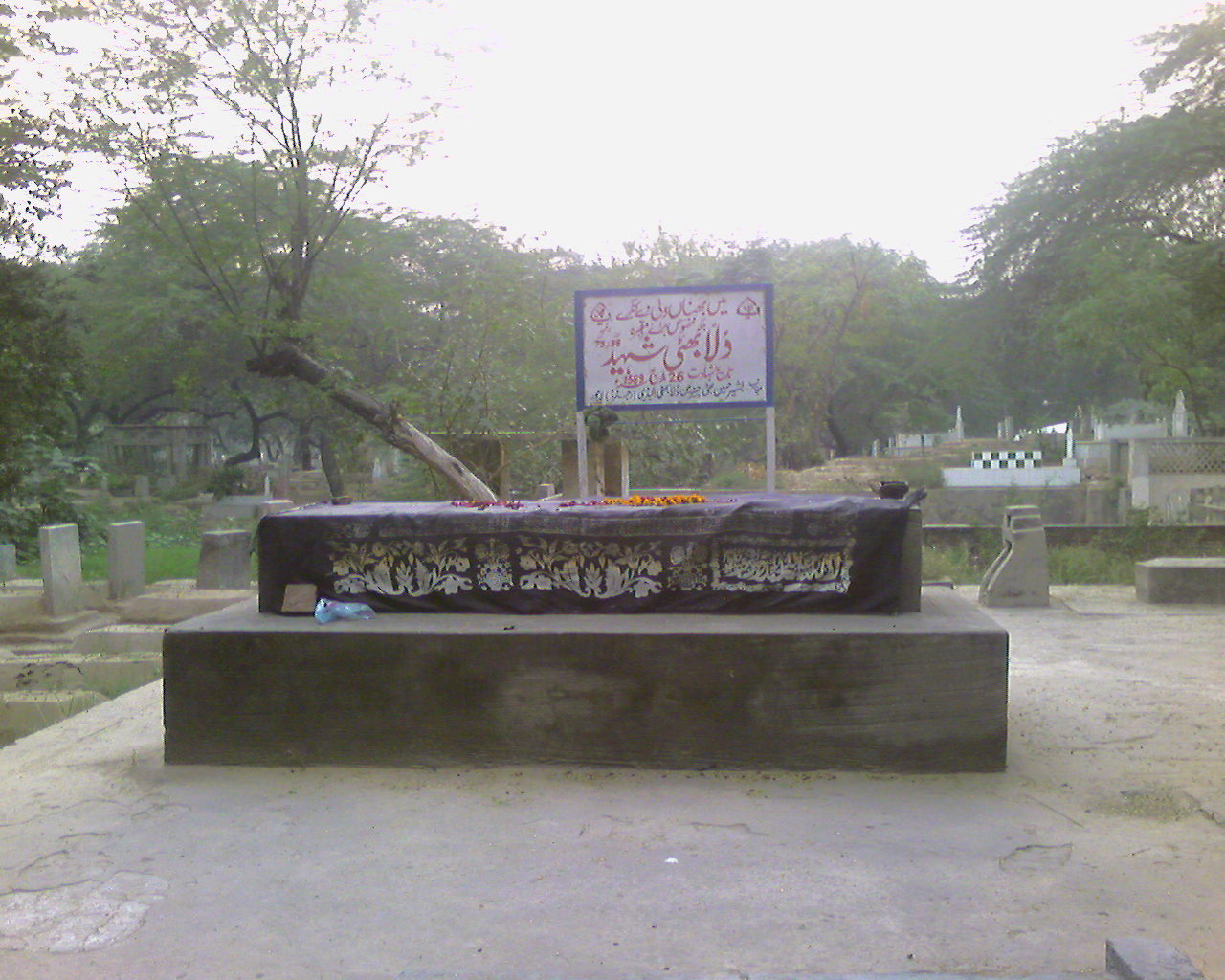
Grave said to be of Dulla Bhatti at Miani Sahib Graveyard

The end for Bhatti came in 1599 when he was hanged in Lahore. Akbar had hoped to make an example of him at the public execution, expecting that he would quake with fear, but Bhatti was steadfast in his resistance to the end. Bhatti's last words were abuses against Akbar. Shah Hussain, a Sufi poet, recorded his purported last words as being "No honourable son of Punjab will ever sell the soil of Punjab".

== Legacy ==
A fragments of the vars (medieval poetry put to music) concerning Dulla Bhatti have survived to the present day. and dhadi Performances recounting his exploits have become less common.

The memory of Bhatti as a saviour of Punjabi girls is recalled at the annual Lohri celebrations in the region to this day, although those celebrations also incorporate many other symbolic strands. The song "Sundri-Mundri" is sung during the celebrations and is a tribute to him. Among the significant modern literature inspired by the life is Takht-e-Lahore, a 1973 play written by Najam Hussein Syed. A novel based on the life of Dulla Bhatti has been written by Baldev Singh Sadaknama.

A number of Indian Punjabi-language films have been produced on his life, including – Dulla Bhatti (1966) by Baldev R. Jhingan, Dulla Bhatti (1998) by Pammi Varinder, Dulla Bhatti (2016) by Minar Malhotra. Two Pakistani films, Dulla Bhatti (1956) by M. S. Dar and Agha G. A. Gul and Dulla Bhatti (1984) by M. Akram, have also been made.

== See also ==
- Rai Ahmad Khan Kharal
- Nizam Lohar
- Jagga Jatt
- Malangi
