= Baar di boli =

Punjabi dialect

Baar di boli (Punjabi: Bār dī bōlī, lit. 'dialect of the Bar') (Note: Shahmukhi: بار دی بولی, Gurmukhi: ਬਾਰ ਦੀ ਬੋਲੀ) is a Punjabi term used to refer to the manner of the Punjabi language that is spoken in the Bar region, an area of Central Punjab in the Pakistani province of Punjab.
