= Neeli Bar =

Region in Punjab, Pakistan

Neeli Bar (Urdu: نیلی بار) is a geographical region in Punjab, Pakistan, located between the rivers Ravi and Satluj.

"Bar" is the name given to areas in Punjab which were thick forests before the arrival of the modern canal irrigation system. Its soil is very fertile, as this plain is formed by the mud that has been collected over millennia by rivers flowing from the Himalayas. This region consists of the districts Sahiwal, Okara and Pakpattan in Pakistani Punjab. This region is famous for the domestic water buffalo breed, the Nili-Ravi.

== History ==
This area was the hub of famous war of Independence of 1857, which was led in this area by Rai Ahmad Khan Kharal.

Neeli Bar derives its name from the blue (Punjabi: Neela) colour of river Sutlej. The region is particularly well-known for the water buffalo breed, the Nili-Ravi. Like the rest of Bar region, Neeli Bar was sparsely populated until the agricultural colonisation of the area in 1926, when Nili Bar Colony was established.

== Language and culture ==
The native language spoken in the area is Punjabi, which is a common language of the Bar area, with various dialects. Punjabi Bar culture is the native culture of the region.
