= Kamalia =

City in Punjab, Pakistan

Kamalia کمالیہ
- City
- Location in Pakistan Kamalia (Pakistan)
- Coordinates: 30°44′N 72°39′E
- Country: Pakistan
- Province: (Punjab, Pakistan) Punjab
- Division: Faisalabad
- District: Toba Tek Singh
- Tehsil: Kamalia
- Union Council: 9 (Urban) + 16 (Rural)

Government
  - Type: Municipal Committee
  - Administrator: Erum Shehzadi
  - Chief Officer: Ali Raza

Area
  - City: 486 km^{2} (188 sq mi)
  - Metro: 55 km^{2} (21 sq mi)
- Elevation: 160 m (520 ft)

Population (2023)
  - City: 166,617
  - Rank: 67th in Pakistan; 42nd in Punjab
  - Density: 343/km^{2} (888/sq mi)
- Time zone: PKT
- Postal code of Kamalia City: 36350
- Area code: 046

Kamalia (Punjabi: کمالیا, Urdu: کمالیہ) is a city in the Toba Tek Singh District of Punjab Province, Pakistan. It is the administrative center of Kamalia Tehsil. It is the 67th most populous city of Pakistan.

== History ==
Kamalia is an ancient city, existing at least before 325 BC. According to Alexander Cunningham, Kamalia was likely a settlement encountered by Alexander the Great in his campaign against the Malli.

The modern settlement of Kamalia was founded in the 14th century by Kamal Khan, a chief of the Kharal Tribe. It was situated 60 km from Jhang, where the Sials lived. The Lekhari or Kamalia Kharals of the lower Ravi quarreled with the Upera Kharals of the upper Ravi. Kamalia remained under Kharal rule until Walidad Khan, the thirteenth chief of Jhang, took possession of the town from Sadaat Yar Khan. Walidad Khan ruled until his death in 1747, after which his successor, Inayat Khan, restored Kharal control. This period lasted for about a generation. Following the death of Nahar Singh, the chief of Nakai Misl, in a battle at Kamalia against the Kharrals in 1768, the town came under the Sikh Confederacy, specifically the Nakai Misl, led by Ran Singh.

When Shah Zaman of the Durrani Empire invaded Punjab, Muzaffar Khan, Governor of Multan taking advantage of the situation marched to Kamalia and expelled the Sikhs and reinstated the Kharal leader Sadaat Yar Khan II, but he did not hold his position for very long. In 1803, Ranjit Singh annexed Kamalia to the Sikh Empire, although he was reinstated by Ranjit Singh who gave him proprietary rights to 40 villages, which were then passed to his son, Muzaffar Khan.

Muhammad Sarfraz Khan, the brother of Muzaffar Khan was loyal to the British. During the Second Anglo-Sikh War, he gave assistance to the British and attacked the Sikhs. During September 1857 Sarfraz Khan informed the British of the activities freedom fighters of Rai Ahmed Khan Kharal in Montgomery District, which acted crucial in his defeat. During the war, Kamalia was seized under the control of the freedom fighters twice, but the British reoccupied it both times. Kamalia was thoroughly sacked during the Indian Revolt of 1857. Muhammad Sarfaraz Khan was succeeded by his son Sadaat Ali Khan.

In the early 20th century, Kamalia remained under the influence of the Kharals, under the British Rule, and was situated in Montgomery District. The municipality of Kamalia was constituted on 29 July 1868. By January 1907, due to heavy debts incurred by the Kharals, the government advanced a loan of one lakh rupees and placed the Kamalia estate under the Court of Wards. This arrangement continued until 1916, after which the estate was released and then partitioned.

On 6 April 1921, a riot broke out in Kamalia over a dispute between The Akalis and Sehajdhari Sikh Party over the ownership of the Prem Sati Gurdwara, which had been previously transferred to the Akalis.

Following the partition, members of the Kharal family continued to hold proprietary rights in Kamalia and its surrounding villages, with some also serving in administrative roles.

== Etymology ==
The present name of the city Kamalia is derived from its 14th century ruler Kamal Khan Kharal.

== Climate ==
Kamalia has a hot desert climate (Köppen BWh). Summers are long and intense, with average highs from April to July routinely surpassing 40 °C, and extreme peaks reaching 48 °C. Winters are brief and mild, with daytime temperatures between 15–25 °C and occasional night lows around 5 °C.

Annual rainfall averages 250–300 mm, with the majority falling during the monsoon season (July–August). Dust and sand storms are common in the pre-monsoon and monsoon months (April–August), due to the region’s arid nature.

Kamalia

Climate chart (precipitation, max. and min. temperature)
| J | F | M | A | M | J | J | A | S | O | N | D |
| 9 21 8 | 15 24 11 | 23 30 15 | 13 36 22 | 13 42 28 | 19 43 31 | 58 40 32 | 47 39 29 | 29 38 26 | 5 35 21 | 2 28 15 | 4 23 10 |
- █ Average max. and min. temperatures in °C
- █ Precipitation totals in mm
Imperial conversion
| J | F | M | A | M | J | J | A | S | O | N | D |
| 0.4 70 46 | 0.6 75 52 | 0.9 86 59 | 0.5 97 72 | 0.5 108 82 | 0.7 109 88 | 2.3 104 90 | 1.9 102 84 | 1.1 100 79 | 0.2 95 70 | 0.1 82 59 | 0.2 73 50 |
- █ Average max. and min. temperatures in °F
- █ Precipitation totals in inches

== Demographics ==
Population

Historical population

| Year | Pop. | ±% p.a. |
|---|---|---|
| 1868 | 5,695 | — |
| 1881 | 7,594 | +2.24% |
| 1891 | 7,490 | −0.14% |
| 1901 | 6,976 | −0.71% |
| 1911 | 8,237 | +1.68% |
| 1921 | 8,916 | +0.80% |
| 1931 | 13,220 | +4.02% |
| 1941 | 14,295 | +0.78% |

| Year | Pop. | ±% p.a. |
|---|---|---|
| 1951 | 28,636 | +7.19% |
| 1961 | 35,248 | +2.10% |
| 1972 | 50,934 | +3.40% |
| 1981 | 61,107 | +2.04% |
| 1998 | 97,324 | +2.78% |
| 2017 | 135,641 | +1.76% |
| 2023 | 166,617 | +3.49% |

The estimated population for 2025 according to Municipal Committee of Kamalia is 172,432.

Languages

Languages of Kamalia MC (2023 Census)
1. Punjabi (95.3%)
2. Urdu (3.90%)
3. Others (0.80%)

=== Religion ===
Religious groups in Kamalia (1868–2023)
| Religious group | 1868 | | 1881 | | 1891 | | 1901 | | 1911 (Note: The sudden change in population percentages of the Sikh and Hindu population between the 1901 and 1921 censuses is likely due to a difference in the definition of a Sikh and a Hindu.) | | 1921 | | 1931 | | 1941 | | 1951 | | 1998 | | 2017 | | 2023 | |
| Religious group | Pop. | % | Pop. | % | Pop. | % | Pop. | % | Pop. | % | Pop. | % | Pop. | % | Pop. | % | Pop. | % | Pop. | % | Pop. | % | Pop. | % |
|---|---|---|---|---|---|---|---|---|---|---|---|---|---|---|---|---|---|---|---|---|---|---|---|---|
| Islam | 2,706 | 47.52% | 4,227 | 55.66% | 3,670 | 49% | 3,358 | 48.14% | 4,114 | 49.95% | 4,221 | 47.34% | 5,940 | 44.93% | 6,011 | 42.05% | 28,457 | 99.37% | 124,897 | 97.9% | 134,443 | 99.09% | 164,520 | 98.74% |
| Hinduism | 2,953 | 51.85% | 3,295 | 43.39% | 3,701 | 49.41% | 3,516 | 50.4% | 2,476 | 30.06% | 4,379 | 49.11% | 5,625 | 42.55% | 6,903 | 48.29% | 0 | 0% | 8 | 0.01% | 6 | 0% | 2 | 0% |
| Sikhism | 36 | 0.63% | 66 | 0.87% | 119 | 1.59% | 102 | 1.46% | 1,644 | 19.96% | 316 | 3.54% | 1,646 | 12.45% | 1,302 | 9.11% | – | – | – | – | 0 | 0% | 2 | 0% |
| Christianity | 0 | 0% | 0 | 0% | 0 | 0% | 0 | 0% | 3 | 0.04% | 0 | 0% | 9 | 0.07% | 75 | 0.52% | – | – | 2,521 | 1.98% | 1,196 | 0.88% | 2,083 | 1.25% |
| Ahmadiyya | – | – | – | – | – | – | – | – | – | – | – | – | – | – | – | – | – | – | 152 | 0.12% | 29 | 0.02% | 7 | 0% |
| Others | 0 | 0% | 6 | 0.08% | 0 | 0% | 0 | 0% | 0 | 0% | 0 | 0% | 0 | 0% | 4 | 0.03% | 179 | 0.63% | 3 | 0% | 0 | 0% | 3 | 0% |
| Total population | 5,695 | 100% | 7,594 | 100% | 7,490 | 100% | 6,976 | 100% | 8,237 | 100% | 8,916 | 100% | 13,220 | 100% | 14,295 | 100% | 28,636 | 100% | 127,581 | 100% | 135,674 | 100% | 166,617 | 100% |

== Notable people ==
- Amjad Saqib
- Riaz Fatyana
- Brijmohan Lall Munjal
- Khalid Ahmed Khan Kharal
- Muhammad Ahmad Ludhianvi
- Amir Habibullah Khan Saadi
- Rai Ahmad Khan Kharal
- Ashfa Riaz Fatyana
- Asad Ur Rehman
- Nazia Raheel
