= Rai Ahmad Khan Kharal =

Punjabi tribal chieftain and folk hero (c. 1776–1857)

- Nawab of Jhamra; Sardar; Ravi da Raath (King of Ravi)
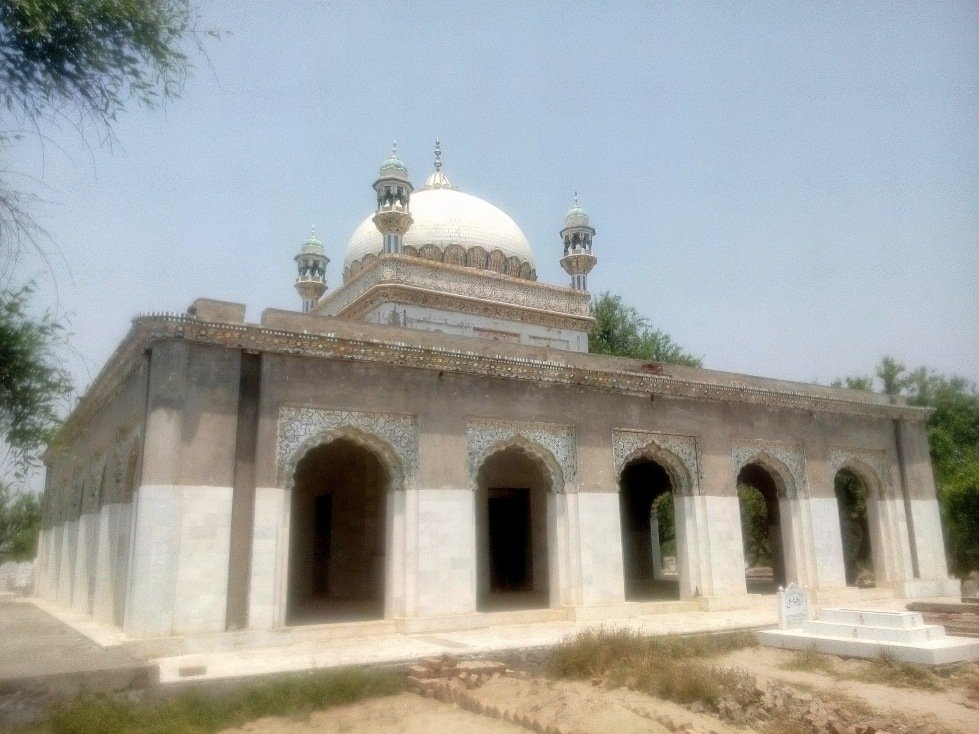
- Tomb of Rai Ahmad Khan Kharal in Jhamra
- Born: c. 1776; Jhamra, Sial State (present-day Faisalabad District, Punjab, Pakistan)
- Died: 21 September 1857 (aged 80–81); Gogera, Punjab Province, British India (present-day Okara District, Punjab, Pakistan)
- Burial: 1857; Jhamra, Punjab
- Dynasty: Kharal
- Father: Rai Nathu Khan Kharal
- Mother: Fateh Bibi Kamoka
- Religion: Sunni Islam
- Occupation: Chieftain; freedom fighter; soldier

Rai Ahmad Khan Kharal (Note: Punjabi: رائے احمد خاں کَھرل, pronounced [ɾaːeː ɛɦməd̪ xãː kʰəˈɾəl]) (c. 1776 – 21 September 1857) was a Punjabi Muslim chieftain of the Kharal tribe who led a tribal rebellion in the Bar region of Punjab against the East India Company, during the Rebellion of 1857. He is regarded as a martyr and a folk hero.

In the early 19th century, Kharal fought against the rising Maharaja Ranjit Singh. According to the local historical accounts, when Ranjit Singh offered Ahmad Khan Kharal a gift, he instead requested the release of Muslim prisoners and captives held by the Sikh authorities, which was granted. Ranjit Singh is also reported to have avoided direct confrontation with Kharal by bypassing his territories. As an elderly man in his late seventies, he raised rebellion against the British Empire and died fighting against the British forces.

== Biography ==
Ahmad Khan Kharal was born in Jhamra, near Tandlianwala, Faisalabad District into a landowning family of the Kharal tribe which was prominent in the Bar region. The Kharals are held to have embraced Islam under the influence of Sufi mystic Baba Farid.

The Kharals had vied for dominance with other Bar tribes such as the Baghela, Kathia, Wattoo, Fatyana and others. Ahmad Khan Kharal was able to maintain influence and control over all of the Sandal Bar.

Leopold Oliver Fitzhardinge Berkeley, also known as Lord Berkley, was the Assistant Commissioner of Gogera in 1857. He held a meeting with important personalities of Gogera including Ahmad Khan Kharal. Berkley demanded all the leaders to supply the British with men and horses to crush the ongoing revolt. To this, Ahmad Khan Kharal replied: "Kharals do not share women, horses and land with anyone" and left.

=== Role in the Revolt of 1857 ===
On July 8, the British arrested a large number of Johiya tribesmen, women and children after they refused to pay the heavy taxes. When Ahmad Khan Kharal received the news, he planned to break into the Gugera Jail and rescue the innocent people imprisoned there. With help of his Baghela, Fatyana, Wattoo and Kathia allies, Ahmad Khan Kharal attacked the jail around 26 July. According to British records, 17 prisoners were killed, 33 were injured and 18 fled; native accounts held that 145 prisoners died and over a hundred East India Company troops were also killed. The British arrested Ahmad Khan Kharal but released him due to the pressure from local tribesmen and insufficient evidence available to charge him. Kharal continued resisting against the British after being released.

In order to arrest Ahmad Khan Kharal, Berkley attacked Jhamra but was unsuccessful although he imprisoned 20 civilians including Ahmad Khan Kharal's youngest son Bala Khan Kharal. The British also took with them a large number of cattle. Ahmad Khan Kharal with the help of Baghela, Kathia, Wattoo, Fatayana and Joiya tribesmen started a guerrilla campaign against the British. According to the Punjab government records, the rebels numbered 20,000 to 30,000 men at their height. Colonial official John Cave-Browne wrote that these rebels took refuge in thick jungles and grass and attacked in groups of 3,000–5,000 guerrillas. The sound of drum beating was the sign that they would attack. The connection of Jhang to Lahore was completely cut on account of their actions. Ahmad Khan Kharal planned a major assault on Gugera with other tribal leaders in a secret meeting but the information was leaked by Sarfraz Kharal of Kamalia to the British. The British prepared themselves to face the upcoming assault and when the rebels attacked they were repulsed with heavy losses.

Ahmad Khan Kharal with his companions retreated to the jungles of Gashkori and continued the guerrilla warfare. The British received news about Ahmad Khan Kharal's presence in the jungles of Gashkori and a force under Captain Black was sent there. The detachment succeeded in killing Ahmad Khan Kharal while he was offering afternoon prayers on 21 September 1857. Many of his close companions, such as his deputy Sarang Khan Kharal, were also killed in this engagement.

Acknowledging the profound impact of the fallen chief, Lieutenant N.W. Elphinstone wrote in his official report:

This expedition, though attended with severe loss on our side, thus ended in irreparable disaster for to the insurgents. Ahmad Khan (Kharral) had been chief instigator of the movement; his reputation for success in former insurrections was considerable, and his influence over the tribes on the Ravee unbounded.

Murad Fatyana, a trusted associate of Ahmad Khan Kharal, took revenge of Ahmad Khan's killing and killed Lord Berkley alongside fifty Anglo-Indian troops in a successful attack two days after Kharal's death. The rebellion continued until it was put down in 1858 by the British reinforcements.

=== Death ===
Ahmad Khan Kharal’s head was decapitated and put on display at Gugera Jail. A few days later, one of his supporters stole the head and buried it in his ancestral graveyard in Jhamra. The local dhola poems describe that:

احمد خاں شہید ہویا تاں سِر پَنجاب دے نوُں جا گھَتیا اے ہَتھ

With Ahmad Khan's martyrdom, Britain has lowered the head of Punjab.

== See also ==
- Dulla Bhatti
- Bhagat Singh
