= Ali Sher Hyderi =

Pakistani politician

Imam Ahle Sunnat Allamah Mawlānā Ali Sher Hyderi علی شیر حیدری
- Official portrait

Chief of Ahle Sunnat Wal Jamaat
- In office 2003–2009
- Preceded by: Azam Tariq
- Succeeded by: Ahmed Ludhianvi

Sarparast-e-Aala of Millat-i-Islamia
- In office 1997–2003
- Preceded by: Ziya ur-Rahman Faruqi
- Succeeded by: Khalifa Abdul Qayyum

Chancellor of Jamia Hydria, Khairpur
- In office 1989–2009
- Preceded by: None (office created)
- Succeeded by: Sanaullah Jawari

Personal life
- Born: 12 July 1963 Khairpur, Sindh, Pakistan
- Died: 17 August 2009 (aged 45–46) Khairpur District, Sindh, Pakistan
- Cause of death: Assassinated during an Ambush
- Resting place: Jamia Hydria, Sindh
- Citizenship: Pakistani
- Political party: Ahle Sunnat Wal Jamaat (2005-2009) Millat-i-Islamia (2002-2005) Sipah-e-Sahaba (1987-2002)
- Education: Jamia Uloom-ul-Islamia

Religious life
- Religion: Islam
- Denomination: Sunni
- Jurisprudence: Hanafi
- Tariqa: Qadiri
- Movement: Deobandi

Muslim leader
- Disciple of: Mawlana Abdul Karim Qurayshi of Ber Sharif

Ali Sher Hyderi (Note: Urdu: علی شیر حیدری) (c. 1963 – 17 August 2009) was a Pakistani Islamic scholar, author and a Religio-political figure who served as the chief of Ahle Sunnat Wal Jama'at (ASWJ).

Hyderi became the chief of Sipah-e Sahaba, an Islamist organisation that was banned as a terrorist group in 2002, following the death of its previous leader, Azam Tariq, in an ambush in 2003.

He had previously also served as the Sarparast-e-Aala (patron-in-chief) of both the Sipah Sahaba and Millat-i-Islamia.

== Early life and education ==
Born in 1963 in Khairpur, he received his early education at a government primary school before continuing his studies at various madrasas, including Islamic institutions in Kolab Jial, Therhi, and later in Karachi at Jamia Uloom al-Islamia.

== Career ==
In 1987, he joined the newly formed Sipah-e-Sahaba (SSP). Within the organization, he became a close associate of its founder, Haq Nawaz Jhangvi, and later of Azam Tariq.

He initially served as the head of the Sindh division of Sipah-e-Sahaba (SSP). Regarded as the organization's spiritual leader, he was known for participating in public theological debates (munazaras) and authoring numerous books on his ideology.

In 1997, he was appointed as its Sarparast-e-Aala (Patron-in-Chief), a position he retained after the SSP was banned and it re-emerged as Millat-i-Islamia.

== Chief of Sipah-e Sahaba ==
Hyderi speaking to his followers, accompanied by his deputy, Ahmed Ludhianvi (right)

Following the assassination of his predecessor, Azam Tariq, by unknown assailants in Islamabad on 6 October 2003, Hyderi was appointed as the party's overall leader and chief. He subsequently named Ahmed Ludhianvi as his deputy.

In July 2008, Hyderi addressed a memorial held for Abdul Rashid Ghazi, the cleric of the Lal Masjid who was killed in a military operation the previous year.

== Arrest and release ==
On 20 July 2005, Hyderi was arrested by authorities during a nationwide crackdown in which over 200 suspected militants were detained. His arrest took place at his seminary in Khairpur.

On 15 February 2006, the Sindh High Court ordered the release of Hyderi. Upon his release from Khairpur Central Jail, he was greeted by a crowd of supporters and students at the Madressah Jamia Hyderia.

== Assassination ==
On 17 August 2009, at approximately 2:00 a.m, His convoy was ambushed by more than twenty suspected Sipah-e-Muhammad-affiliated armed men near Khairpur as he was returning from a religious event in a nearby village. The assailants, who had lying in wait, specifically targeted his vehicle, initiating a firefight with his security guards. Haideri was killed in the exchange of fire.

His funeral was held at Jamia Hydria and attended by thousands. The funeral prayer was led by Ahmed Ludhianvi, who succeeded him as the organization's chief.

The killing triggered unrest in interior Sindh and Karachi, resulting in the deaths of two protesters and injuries to several others. Concurrent protests were reported across the country, including in Islamabad, Gilgit, and numerous other urban centers. The city of Jhang also experienced significant tension.

The assassination was condemned by Sindh Chief Minister Syed Qaim Ali Shah, who issued a public statement expressing his deep sorrow and condolences to the victim's family. He characterized the killing as a conspiracy by "anti-state forces" aimed at inciting religious violence within the country.

In 2017, a memorial was ceremony is held in his honor at his seminary in Khairpur.

== Books ==
=== By him ===
- Kkutbaat E Haidri
- Fatawa Takfeer Rawafiz

=== About him ===
- Allama Ali Sher Haideri Hayaat Khidmaat (Urdu: علامہ علی شیر حیدری حیات خدمت), Muhammad Younas Qasmi (2010)

== See more ==
- List of Deobandis
