= Isar ul-Haq Qasmi =

Pakistani Islamic cleric

Isar-ul-Haq Qasmi

Chief of the Sipah-e-Sahaba
- In office 1990–1991
- Preceded by: Haq Nawaz Jhangvi
- Succeeded by: Zia ur Rehman Farooqi

Member of National Assembly of Pakistan
- In office 1990–1991
- Preceded by: Sayeda Abida Hussain
- Succeeded by: Azam Tariq

Personal life
- Born: 1964 Samundri, Punjab, Pakistan
- Died: 1991 (aged 26–27)
- Cause of death: Assassination by Gunshots

Religious life
- Religion: Islam
- Denomination: Sunni
- Jurisprudence: Hanafi
- Movement: Deobandi

Isar-ul-Haq Qasmi (Urdu: ایثار الحق قاسمی; died 1991) was a Pakistani Islamic scholar and Religio-political figure, who was a member of Sipah-e-Sahaba and had been a member of the National Assembly of Pakistan between 1990 and 1993 representing the Jhang constituency.

== Early life and education ==
Qasmi was born in 1964 to a family which migrated from Ambala and settled in Samundri, Punjab, at the Partition, with a father who worked in the Middle East for years (like many SSP members). He was educated in three madrasas in Lahore, and at first pursued a business career but then decided to become khatib (preacher) in an Okara mosque from 1985 onward, where he also established a madrasa, and he would soon gain a reputation for his clashes with the local police, before moving to Jhang at the request of Haq Nawaz Jhangvi, to preach in one of the market-towns of the district.

His family was Punjabi Rajput.

== Political career ==
He was elected to the National Assembly of Pakistan as a candidate of Islami Jamhoori Ittehad (IJI) in the 1990 Pakistani general election. He received 62,486 votes and defeated Nawab Amanullah Khan Sial of the Pakistan Democratic Alliance (PDA).

== Assassination ==
He was killed in 1991 by suspected Shia militants during a by-election in Jhang.

== See also ==
- Azam Tariq
- Haq Nawaz Jhangvi
