= Ziya ur-Rahman Faruqi =

Pakistani Islamic scholar

Mawlānā Zia ur Rehman Farooqi
- ضیاءالرحمن فاروقی

Chief of Sipah-e-Sahaba
- In office 1991–1997
- Preceded by: Isar ul Haq Qasmi
- Succeeded by: Azam Tariq

Sarparast-e-Aala of Sipah-e-Sahaba
- In office 1994–1997
- Preceded by: None (office created)
- Succeeded by: Ali Sher Hyderi

Personal life
- Born: 4 March 1953 Samundri, Punjab, Dominion of Pakistan
- Died: 18 January 1997 (aged 43) Lahore, Punjab, Pakistan
- Cause of death: Assassination by Explosion
- Parent: Maulana Muhammad Ali Janbaz (father)
- Education: University of the Punjab; Jamia Khairul Madaris
- Known for: co-founding of Sipah-e-Sahaba Pakistan

Religious life
- Religion: Islam
- Denomination: Sunni
- Jurisprudence: Hanafi
- Movement: Deobandi

Zia ur Rehman Farooqi (Urdu: ضیاءالرحمن فاروقی; 1953 – 18 January 1997) Pakistani Islamic scholar and a Religio-political figure who was the co-founder and the chief of Sipah-e-Sahaba Pakistan.

He had also served as the Sarparast-e-Aala (patron-in-chief) of the organization from 1994 to 1997.

In 1997, Farooqi was assassinated in a bombing at a court in Lahore. The attack occurred during a court hearing. Sipah-e-Sahaba accused its rival group, Sipah-e-Muhammad, of carrying out the assassination.

== Early life and education ==
Farooqi was born on March 4, 1953, in Khanewal, into a Deobandi family. His father, Maulana Muhammad Ali Janbaz, was an active member of the Majlis Ahrar-e-Islam and was imprisoned in Sukkur Central Jail at the time of Farooqi's birth.

Farooqi received his primary education in his hometown. He then studied Quranic memorization at Jamia Rashidiya in Sahiwal.

For his formal religious education, he attended Darul Uloom Kabirwala and completed his Dars-e-Nizami from Jamia Khair-ul-Madaris in Multan.

In addition to his religious qualifications, Farooqi earned a Bachelor of Arts (BA) degree with distinction from Punjab University.

== Early religious and political career ==
He entered politics as a member of the Jamiat Ulema-e-Islam (JUI). He was a leading figure in Mufti Mahmood's election campaign during the 1970 general elections.

After Mahmood assumed the office of Chief Minister of Khyber Pakhtunkhwa, Farooqi worked closely with him and was appointed to the position of provincial leader within the party.

== Joining Sipah-e-Sahaba ==
After initially being associated with the Jamiat Talba-e-Islam and Jamiat-ul-Ulema-e-Islam, Farooqi became a colleague of Haq Nawaz Jhangvi. He left the Jamiat to co-found the Sipah-e-Sahaba (SSP) with Jhangvi, playing a key role in expanding the organization from Jhang to a national level. During this period, he was also associated with the Majlis Ahrar-e-Islam.

== Leadership of Sipah-e-Sahaba ==
Following the killings of Jhangvi and Isar-ul-Haq Qasmi in 1991, Farooqi was appointed as the chief of the organization while he was on a Tablighi tour in Bangladesh.

Upon his return to Pakistan, Farooqi faced significant legal challenges. He was placed under house arrest by authorities for nearly three years and was repeatedly restricted from international travel.

According to sources, Farooqi aspired to establish a university aimed at producing scholars who could articulate Islamic teachings to non-Muslim countries in their native languages. As part of this objective, he proposed expanding the existing Jamia Umar Farooq Islamia into a larger institution, tentatively named Umar Farooq Islamic University. He reportedly acquired 42 kanals of land in Faisalabad for the project and sought significant funding from his organization.

== Arrest and Assassination ==
On 20 November 1995, Farooqi and Azam Tariq, were arrested and jailed in a crackdown targeting the organization for its anti-Shia activities.

While appearing at the Sessions Court in Lahore in February 1997, a large explosion occurred. The blast killed Farooqi and seriously injured Tariq. Following the killing of Farooqi, Tariq was appointed as the new leader of the organization.

== Writings ==
He has authored more than 60 religious books on various subjects. His two famous books, "The Leaders and the Prophets" and "Faisal, a Bright Star", were awarded prizes by the Saudi government and the International Research Center, respectively.

Some of his books include:

- شہید کربلا
- سیدہ فاطمہ
- تاریخی دستاویز
- خطابات منبر و محراب
- خطبات فاروقی
- جواہرات فاروقی
- عائشہ صدیقہ
- ابوبکر صدیق
- عمر فاروق
- سیدنا عثمان غنی
- سیدنا علی المرتضی
- سیرت النبی
- رہبر و رہنما
- فیصل ایک روشن ستارہ
