= PP-127 Jhang-III =

Constituency of Provincial Assembly of Punjab

- Constituency for the Provincial Assembly of Punjab
- Region: Jhang city in Jhang District

Current constituency
- Member: Sheikh Muhammad Akram
- Created from: PP-76 Jhang-IV (2002-2018); PP-126 Jhang-III (2018-2023)

PP-127 Jhang-III (پی پی-127، جھنگ-3) is a Constituency of Provincial Assembly of Punjab, Pakistan. Located in the Jhang District, it primarily represents Jhang City.

== General elections 2024 ==
Provincial election 2024: PP-127 Jhang-III
Party	Candidate	Votes	%	±%
PTI	Sheikh Muhammad Akram (Note: Filed nomination papers as PTI candidate but ECP allowed him to run as an Independent)	50,404	39.61	
Independent	Masroor Nawaz Jhangvi	40,127	31.53	
PML(N)	Rashida Yaqub	16,230	12.75	
PRHP	Muhammad Ahmed Ludhianvi	10,182	8.00	
PPP	Nasir Abbass	2,611	2.05	
TLP	Safder Ali	2,334	1.83	
Others	Others (thirty candidates)	5,379	4.23	
Turnout		131,091	47.67	
Total valid votes		127,267	97.08	
Rejected ballots		3,824	2.92	
Majority		10,277	8.08	
Registered electors		274,992		
hold				

== General elections 2018 ==
Provincial election 2018: PP-126 Jhang-III
Party	Candidate	Votes	%	±%
Independent	Moavia Azam Tariq	65,646	50.87	
Independent	Sheikh Sheraz Akram	32,934	25.52	
Independent	Abu Al Hasan	16,602	12.86	
PML(N)	Asif Ali Shahid	7,991	6.19	
Others	Others (fourteen candidates)	5,882	4.56	
Turnout		132,010	54.37	
Total valid votes		129,055	97.76	
Rejected ballots		2,955	2.24	
Majority		32,712	25.35	
Registered electors		242,804		

== General elections 2013 ==
Provincial election 2013: PP-76 Jhang-IV
Party	Candidate	Votes	%	±%
PML(N)	Muhmmad Saqlain Anwar Sipra	28,396	29.16	
Independent	Mehr Muhammad Nawaz Khan Bharwana	28,136	28.89	
PTI	Muhammad Abuzar Bharwana	13,432	13.79	
Independent	Mehr Muhammad Sarfaraz Khan Jappa	12,330	12.66	
Independent	Ch. Qamar Aftab Chaddhar	9,365	9.62	
Independent	Ijaz Hussain	2,408	2.47	
JI	Mian Abdul Razaq Hanjra	1,431	1.47	
Others	Others (seven candidates)	1,888	1.94	
Turnout		101,664	65.10	
Total valid votes		97,386	95.79	
Rejected ballots		4,278	4.21	
Majority		260	0.27	
Registered electors		156,162		

== General elections 2008 ==
Contesting candidates	Party affiliation	Votes polled
Muhammad Anas Khan	Lashkar e Jhangvi	70,764

== See also ==
- PP-126 Jhang-II
- PP-128 Jhang-IV
