= Sipah-e-Muhammad Pakistan =

Pakistani Shia vigilante network

Sipah-e-Muhammad سپاہ محمد صلی الله علیہ وآلہ وسلم
- Leader: Allama Mureed Abbas Yazdani X
- Founders: Allama Mureed Abbas Yazdani; Maulana Syed Ghulam Raza Naqvi; Moulana Munawwar Abbas Alvi
- Founded: 1994 (officially)
- Split from: Tehreek-e-Jafaria
- Succeeded by: Liwa Zainebiyoun; Islami Tehreek Pakistan
- Headquarters: Thokar Niaz Beg, Lahore, Pakistan (former/historical)
- Ideology: Protection of Shia Muslim community from sectarian violence; Extermination of the sectarian anti-Shia figure's from Pakistan; Shia Islamism
- Religion: Shia Islam
- National affiliation: Tehreek-e-Jafaria Pakistan (allegedly); Shia Ulema Council
- International affiliation: Axis of Resistance
- Colors: Black and Yellow
- Slogan: "Far from us is Oppression ." (Arabic: هيهات منا الذلة)
- Parliament of Pakistan: 0 / 342

Party flag

Sipah-e-Muhammad Pakistan (S.M.P) (Urdu: سپاہ محمد پاکستان; Arabic: جنود محمد; English: Soldiers of Muhammad) is a Shia Pakistani organization and former political party-turned-vigilante assassin network and militant organization.

It has claimed credit for a series of target killings of the leaders of anti-Shia groups Sipah-e-Sahaba and Lashkar-e-Jhangvi.

It was founded by Pakistani Shia cleric Allama Syed Mureed Abbas Yazdani in 1993 to counter the anti-Shia violence in Pakistan and was headquartered in Thokar Niaz Beg, Lahore.

== History ==
Maulana Mureed Abbas Yazdani with his colleagues separated from Tehreek-e-Jafria Pakistan and formed the Sipah-e-Muhammad Pakistan in 1993 or 1994 in order to protect Shia Muslim community of Pakistan and to counter sectarian violence against the Pakistani Shia Muslims orchestrated by Takfiri deobandi groups such as Sipah-e-Sahaba or Lashkar-e-Jhangvi, It is involved in the assassination of sectarian clerics, activist's and other figures that are responsible for the anti-Shia violence in Pakistan.

The formation of Sipah-e-Muhammad was part of a growing wave of Violent anti-shia incidents in Pakistan since 1980s by the sectarian Salafi, Wahabhi, Deobandi and Barelvi groups. Specifically, Sipah-e-Sahaba and Lashkar-e-Jhangvi which played a significant role in instigating and carrying out attacks on Shia Muslims in Pakistan. At the end of 1989 following the assassination of top Anti-Shia sectarian cleric Haq Nawaz Jhangvi by suspected Shia militants sparked the armed sectarian conflict in Pakistan between the Shiites and Sunnis all over the country, as Shia Muslim community also picked up arms and formed militias for self-defence in order to protect themselves from the Anti-Shia sectarian groups.

According to Moulana Munawwar Abbas Alvi, a close colleague of Yazdani and founding member of the Sipah-e-Muhammad:

"The Shia youth would have not picked up the weapons if they never have experienced insecurity and persecution from the sectarian groups during the 1980s because the government had failed to provide proper protection to the patriotic Shia Muslims of Pakistan and sectarian groups were operating in the country without any restrictions, so we had no choice other than forming militant organizations for self-defence. Our fight is against sectarian terror groups, not the State of Pakistan, nor our anti-sectarianist Sunni brothers".

It is alleged that the Sipah-e-Muhammad Pakistan is the armed wing of Tehreek-e-Jafria Pakistan, The main Shiite political party of Pakistan. Its leader was Ghulam Raza Naqvi who was imprisoned in 1996 and released in 2014. Since his death in 2016, it is unclear who leads the group.

It was alleged Yazdani's nephew Malik Muhammad Wasi-ul-Baqir was attempting to take control of Sipah-e-Muhammad.

== Activities ==
=== Aim ===
Sipah-e-Muhammad's primary aim was to target the sectarian leadership of the banned Deobandi terrorist organizations Sipah-e-Sahaba or Lashkar-e-Jhangvi in retaliatory actions for targeting Shia Muslim community. However, with the subsequent rise in the violence against Shia Muslims, it claimed to have been reforming.

=== Target killings and militancy ===
According to a Mapping Militant Organizations writing from Stanford University, the "primary methods" of Sipah-e-Muhammad are targeted killings of prominent Anti-Shia figures – the notable targets of such killings of Sipah-e-Muhammad are Zia ur Rehman Farooqi, Azam Tariq, Riaz Basra and Ali Sher Hyderi including Masood ur Rehman Usmani and Salim Khatiri. The top leaders of Sipah-e-Sahaba or Lashkar-e-Jhangvi were targeted by the Sipah-e-Muhammad for their beliefs and activities against the Shia Muslim community of Pakistan.

=== Arrests of members ===
On the 3rd of August, 2024, the Counter Terrorism Department (CTD) of Punjab arrested 3 people who were associated with 3 separate banned organizations from 3 separate locations, in order to thwart what they called "a significant terror plot". These were:

- Abdul Wahab from Chakwal who was associated with LeJ (Lashkar-e-Jhangvi).
- Saifullah from Faisalabad who was associated with ISPP (Islamic State – Pakistan Province).
- Khurram Abbas from Khushab who was associated with SMP (Sepah-e-Muhammad Pakistan).

The CTD recovered large caches of prohibited materials from the arrested, including 1,625 grams of explosives, three hand grenades, two IED bombs, three detonators, eight feet of safety fuse wire, 12 pamphlets, 10 stickers, and Rs 22,250 in cash.

== Headquarters ==
The movement had strong presence in the Shia communities in Pakistan, especially in the Shia-majority town of Thokar Niaz Beg in Lahore where it ran a "virtual state within a state" mainly in the 1990s. The group had established a stronghold of where it was headquartered in Thokar Niaz Beg in the 1990s until the collapse of its presence there by 2007 or 2010.

== Affiliations ==
Sipah-e-Muhammad was alleged to have ties with Iran.

== Designation ==
The Government of Pakistan designated Sipah-e-Muhammad a terrorist organization in on 14 August 2001 under the Anti-Terrorism Act 1997.

== See also ==
- Shia Islam in Pakistan
- Majlis Wahdat-e-Muslimeen
- Islami Tehreek Pakistan
- Shia Ulema Council
- Tehrik-e-Jafaria
- Imamia Students Organisation
- Liwa Zainabiyoun
