= Aurangzeb Farooqi =

Pakistani cleric and politician

Mufti Aurangzeb Faruqi
- اورنگ زیب فاروقی
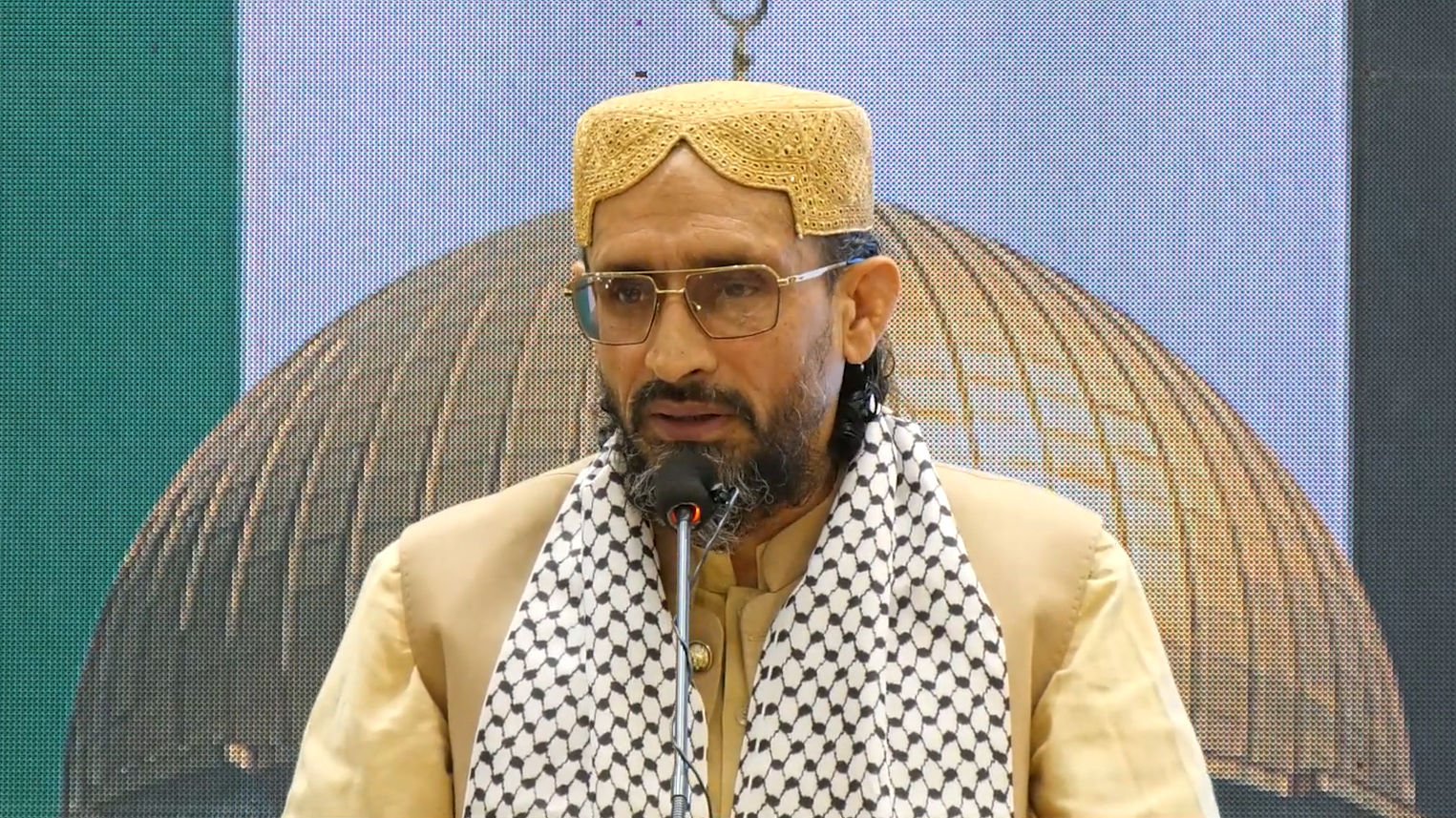
- Faruqi in 2023 during the Hurmat-e-Masjid Aqsa Conference

Chief of Ahle Sunnat Wal Jamaat
- Incumbent
- Assumed office 2014
- Preceded by: Muhammad Ahmed Ludhianvi

Head of Sipah-e-Sahaba's Karachi Division
- Incumbent
- Assumed office 2002
- Preceded by: Abdul Ghafoor Nadeem

Personal life
- Born: November 10, 1972 (age 53) Abbotabad, KPK, Pakistan
- Citizenship: Pakistani
- Political party: PHRP (2013-present) Sipah-e-Sahaba ASWJ
- Education: Jamia Uloom-ul-Islamia

Religious life
- Religion: Islam
- Denomination: Sunni
- Jurisprudence: Hanafi
- Movement: Deobandi

Aurangzeb Faruqi (Urdu: اورنگزیب فاروقی, romanized: Awrangzīb Fārūqī) is a Pakistani Islamic scholar and far-right politician who is the chief of the Ahle Sunnat Wal Jamaat (ASWJ), also known as the Sipah-e-Sahaba.

Faruqi took part in the 2024 Pakistani general election on NA-230 on the ticket of Pakistan Rah-e-Haq Party.

Farooqi is listed on Pakistan's terrorism watch, referred to as the "fourth schedule." Video recordings depict Farooqi vociferating, "Shia are infidels!" during his speeches.

== Early life and education ==
Farooqi was born on 10 November 1972 in Abbottabad, Pakistan. He completed his primary education before enrolling at Jamia Farooqia in Karachi, where he studied under Islamic scholars Saleemullah Khan and Muhammad Adil Khan. He graduated from Jamia Uloom-ul-Islamia having completed the Dars-i Nizami curriculum.

Following his education, Farooqi served as an Imam at several mosques in Karachi. During this period, he became a member of the Sipah-e-Sahaba Pakistan (SSP).

The leadership of the ASWJ (Sipah-e-Sahaba) was reorganized in 2014 after the death of Khalifa Abdul Qayyum. At an organizational meeting in Jhang, Ahmed Ludhianvi was elevated to the position of Patron-in-Chief (Sarparast-e-Aala), and Farooqi was subsequently appointed as the new Chief of the organization.

== Political career ==
Farooqi campaigned for 2013 elections but lost by 203 votes.

He again campaigned for the 2018 elections, and got 23,625 votes in PS-128, losing to MQM candidate.

== Assassination attempts ==
=== 2012 Attempt ===
On 25 December 2012, Farooqi was traveling in a motorcade through the Gulshan-e-Iqbal area of Karachi. As his convoy navigated a U-turn near a roundabout, it was ambushed by assailants. The attackers, positioned on three sides using a car and two motorcycles, opened fire with a variety of weapons, including 9mm pistols, .222 rifles, and submachine guns.

Farooqi sustained a non-life-threatening gunshot wound to the leg. The attack resulted in the deaths of at least four policemen, his driver, and 6 of his private guards.

The assassination attempt triggered large-scale protests and violence across Karachi. Supporters of Farooqi's party, the Ahle Sunnat Wal Jamaat (ASWJ), blocked roads, burned tires, and forced markets to close for a day of mourning. An alleged member of the militant organization Sipah-e-Muhammad was taken into custody on suspicion of carrying out the attack.

=== 2013 Attempts ===
Two further assassination attempts occurred in 2013. The first, on May 9, targeted his convoy as he was traveling to Landhi. Gunmen on motorcycles and in cars opened fire, wounding two policemen and two of his private guards.

A second attack followed in August near Abbas Town, Karachi, where assailants fired upon his motorcade. Although Farooqi was unharmed in both incidents, security guards returned fire during the second attack, and the assailants fled. No casualties were reported from the August attack.

=== 2015 Attempt ===
On 15 February 2015, Farooqi survived another assassination attempt in Karachi. As his convoy passed near the Quaidabad after midnight, unidentified gunmen opened fire from a nearby bridge. The attack disabled his vehicle by bursting at least one of its tires. While Farooqi escaped unharmed, several of his security guards sustained injuries.

== See also ==
- List of Deobandis
- List of people who survived assassination attempts
