= Sunni Ulema Council =

Sunni Islamist organization in Pakistan

Sunni Ulema Council Pakistan
- سنی علماء کونسل پاکستان
- Variant flag of ASWJ, often used by SUC
- Formation: 2001
- Purpose: Sunni Islamism; Anti-Shi'ism; Deobandism; Political Islam
- Headquarters: Islamabad, Pakistan
- Location: Pakistan
- Secretary General: Masood ur Rehman Usmani (till 2024)
- Sarparast: Ahmed Ludhianvi
- Leader of Punjab Division: Muhammad Ashraf Tahir
- Affiliations: Sipah-e-Sahaba; Ahle Sunnat Wal Jamaat

Sunni Ulema Council (S.U.C) (Urdu: سنی علماء کونسل; English: Council of Sunni Scholars) is a Sunni Deobandi Islamist religio-political organization in Pakistan, which is affiliated with the Ahle Sunnat Wal Jama'at (ASWJ).

The group was led by Masood ur Rehman Usmani until his assassination by unknown gunmen in Islamabad in January 2024.

It is rival group to the Shia Ulema Council. The group's political alignment was further demonstrated when it under the leadership of Muhammad Ashraf Tahir joined the Difa-e-Pakistan Council, an Islamist alliance, in late 2011. This move came amidst heightened tensions with the United States following a 2011 NATO attack on Pakistan near the Afghan border.

The organization has been the target of violent attacks, resulting in the deaths of several members and leaders. These include Salim Khatiri, its Karachi leader, who was assassinated in an attack widely attributed to Shia militants, and Masood ur Rehman Usmani, who was killed in Islamabad in January 2024.

== See also ==
- Ahle Sunnat Wal Jamaat
