= Sipra =

Jat clan of Punjab

Sipra (also known as Sapra, Sipru, Sipraw or Supra) is a Jat clan of Punjabis found in the Punjab region of Pakistan and India. The Sipras are a subclan of the Gill Jatts.

== Notable people ==
- Shaikh Bahlol Daryai, a 16th century Punjabi Sufi saint best known for founding the Bahlol shahi sect of Qadiriyya Sufi order. According to Shafqat Tanvir Mirza he was from the Spira clan. The de-facto Sultans of Mysore, Hyder Ali and Tipu Sultan, have been argued to be his descendants.
- Saqlain Anwar Sipra, former Member of Provincial Assembly of Punjab
- Haq Nawaz Jhangvi, Pakistani Deobandi cleric, founder of the anti-Shia extremist organization Sipah-e-Sahaba
- Gurpreet Kaur Sapra, Indian Administrative Service officer
- Haresh Sapra, Indian-American academic
