= Fatwas of Osama bin Laden =

Osama bin Laden authored two fatwas: the first was published in August 1996 and the second in February 1998. At the time, bin Laden was not a wanted man in any country except his native Saudi Arabia, and was not yet known as the leader of the international jihadist organization al-Qaeda. These fatwas received relatively little attention until after the August 1998 United States embassy bombings, for which bin Laden was indicted. The indictment mentions the first fatwā, and claims that Khalid al-Fawwaz, of bin Laden's Advice and Reformation Committee in London, participated in its communication to the press.

== 1996 fatwa ==
Bin Laden's 1996 fatwa is entitled "Declaration of War against the Americans Occupying the Land of the Two Holy Places". This document is sometimes called the Ladenese epistle, a term derived from bin Laden's nasab. It is a long piece, and complains of American activities in numerous countries. It was faxed to Arabic-language newspapers internationally but particularly in England. It first appeared in the London-based Arabic paper Al-Quds Al-Arabi.

== 1998 fatwa ==
The 1998 fatwa reached Al Quds Al Arabi by fax, and was signed by five people, four of whom represented specific Islamist groups. The signatories as a group were identified as the "World Islamic Front for Jihad Against Jews and Crusaders".

- Osama bin Laden
- Ayman al-Zawahiri, "emir of the Jihad Group in Egypt", probably meaning Islamic Jihad
- Ahmed Refai Taha, alias Abu Yasser, of al-Gama'a al-Islamiyya (in Egypt). His endorsement was later retracted because of the enormous unpopularity of terrorism in Egypt following the November 1997 Luxor massacre of tourists and Egyptians by al-Gama'a al-Islamiyya. Taha rationalized his signature to fellow members of the Islamic Group by saying he had only been asked over the telephone to join in a statement of support for the Iraqi people.
- Mir Hamzah, "secretary of the Jamiat-ul-Ulema-e-Pakistan"
- Fazul Rahman, "emir of the Jihad Movement", probably Harakat ul-Jihad-i-Islami or Harkat-ul-Mujahedeen (HuM).

This fatwa complains of American military presence in Saudi Arabia, the sanctions against Iraq, and American support for Israel. Claiming that the United States has been using its military bases in the Arabian Peninsula as "a spearhead through which to fight the neighboring Muslim peoples", the fatwa purports to provide religious authorization for indiscriminate killing of Americans and their allies – combatant or civilian – everywhere. It appeared in February 1998 and the embassy bombings followed in August.

=== World Islamic Front ===
The World Islamic Front is the organization that issued the World Islamic Front Statement of 23 February 1998, "Jihad Against Jews and Crusaders", listing the actions of Americans that they claim conflict with "God's order", and stating that the Front's "ruling to kill the Americans and their allies—civilians and military—is an individual duty for every Muslim who can do it in any country in which it is possible to do it." Terrorism experts consider the "World Islamic Front" synonymous with al-Qaeda.

The 9/11 Commission uses the text of the 23 February 1998 fatwa as evidence that linked Osama bin Laden, Ayman al-Zawahiri, and al-Qaeda to the September 11, 2001 attacks in New York City, Arlington County, Virginia, and near Shanksville, Pennsylvania.

=== Effects of the World Islamic Front Statement ===
The 23 February 1998 fatwa is the first known official order of the World Islamic Front. The fatwa calls upon each individual member of the existing Ummah to, "in accordance with the words of Almighty God, 'fight the pagans all together as they fight you all together,' and 'fight them until there is no more tumult or oppression, and there prevail justice and faith in God.'" The fatwa is widely regarded by terrorism experts as the founding document of the World Islamic Front.

== See also ==
- Motivations of the September 11 attacks
- List of fatwas
