= Government Islamia High School Jhang Sadar =

Government Islamia Higher Secondary School Jhang Sadar
- گورنمنٹ اسلامیہ ہائیر سیکنڈری سکول جھنگ صدر

Location
- Bhakkar Road; Jhang Sadar; Jhang Sadar, Punjab; Pakistan

Information
- School type: Government Higher Secnondary School
- Motto: نیک بنو اور ایک بنو (Be virtuous and be united)
- Established: 1905
- Staff: 51
- Teaching staff: 47
- Gender: Boys
- Enrolment: 1015 (Oct 2018)
- Emiscode: 33220026

The Govt. Islamia Higher Secondary School Jhang Sadar (گورنمنٹ اسلامیہ ہائی سکول جھنگ صدر) is a boys high school. It is the biggest school of the city and the first school of Jhang that was established for the sake of education of the children of the Muslims of this city. The school was established in 1905 as a primary school, then was upgraded to elementary school in 1908 and as a high school in 1912. The School was further upgraded to a Higher Secondary level (up to Grade XII) in 2016. The school is located on Bhakkar Road, near Thana Sadar in Jhang Sadar, Punjab, Pakistan. It has an area of 50 Kanal, 16 Marla. It has 51 faculty members and about 821 enrollment.
