= Rajanwala =

Coordinates: 30°25′N 70°44′E

Rajanwala is a town near the bank of the Chenab River in Pakistan's Jhang District. The nearest major town is Chund Bharwana. In the time of the Mughal emperor Aurangzeb, Rajanwala was a business centre, known for its market. A ritual fair was organized by Hindus in the nearby village of Massan.

== Culture ==
Agriculture is Rajanwala's main source of income. Different melā (fairs) are an important part of the town's cultural activity. The annual melā at the shrine of Syed Laal Ajmair and Saaid Jalaal is held for four days.

== Sports ==
Cricket is the most popular sport. There are two teams, Yong Jhoole Laal Cricket Club and Ali Hyder Cricket Club. Matches are held on every Eid at the Laal Ajmair Cricket Ground.

Tent pegging is the main source of amusement. Many of Rajanwala's residents have their own horses and take part. Al Rajan Sadaat Tent Pegging Club is the main representative of the area. Other traditional sports include pirr-kaudi, dhodha, pithu garam, lukan meeti, baari and bateera/kurrar larai.
