= Khalifa Abdul Qayyum =

Pakistani politician

- خلیفہ عبدالقیوم

Member of the Provincial Assembly of Khyber Pakhtunkhwa
- In office 2008–2013
- Constituency: PK-64 (D.I. Khan-I).
- Prime Minister: Yousaf Raza Gillani

Sarparast-e-Aala of Ahle Sunnat Wal Jamaat
- In office 2003–2014
- Preceded by: Ali Sher Hyderi
- Succeeded by: Ahmed Ludhianvi

Personal details
- Born: July 2, 1956 Dera Ismail Khan
- Died: 18 October 2014 (aged 58) Dera Ismail Khan
- Education: Shahadat Ul Almia
- Occupation: Politician

Khalifa Abdul Qayyum (born 2 July 1956 – 18 October 2014) was a Pakistani politician who served as a member of the Khyber Pakhtunkhwa Assembly from 2008 to 2013 and was the Sarparast-e-Aala of the Ahle Sunnat Wal Jama'at (ASWJ).

== Assassination Attempt ==
On 26 January 2009, a bomb planted on a motorcycle exploded in Dera Ismail Khan near Central Jail outside Town Hall.

Local police officer, Abdur Rasheed said, "The bomb went off minutes after a provincial lawmaker, Khalifa Abdul Qayyum, had passed by the area. It is not clear whether Qayyum was the target, but our investigation teams have rushed to the site of the blast to collect evidence."

== Death and Funeral ==
On 18 October 2014, Khalifa Abdul Qayyum died in Dera Ismail Khan District after a prolonged illness.

His funeral prayers were offered by Maulana Abdul Rauf in Islamabad. Thousands of people including Fazlur Rehman Khalil, Aurangzaib Farooqi participated.
