= Shaikh Bahlol Daryai =

Sufi saint (1515–1575)

Shaikh Muhammad Bahlol
- شیخ محمد بہلول
- Born: 921 H (1515 CE); Tibba Shah Behlol, Punjab (present-day Punjab, Pakistan)
- Died: 983 H (1575 CE) near Pindi Bhattian, Lahore Subah, Mughal Empire (present-day Punjab, Pakistan)
- Resting place: Darbar Shah Behlol, Pindi Bhattian
- Era: Early Mughal era

Shaikh Muhammad Bahlol Daryai, also known as Shah Bahlul Chinioti (d. 1575) was a 16th century Punjabi Sufi saint best known for founding the Bahlol shahi sect of Qadiriyya Sufi order and for being the spiritual teacher of Madhu Lal Hussain, one of the earliest Punjabi poets. His shrine is located near Pindi Bhattian, in Punjab, Pakistan.

== Biography ==
Tomb of Bahlol Daryai

Shaikh Bahlol was born in 1515 CE at Tibba Shah Behlol near Lalian. According to Shafqat Tanvir Mirza he was born into the Sipra Jat clan, and his father Tāni (or Tīni) was a farmer. Shaikh Bahlol was a disciple of Shah-i-Latif; after travelling widely throughout Iran, Iraq and Arabia he later settled in his ancestral village near Chiniot, where he taught Madho Lal Hussain for twelve years. Before his death he made Madhu Lal Hussain his representative in Lahore.

According to some historians, one of his descendants Muhammad Ali went to Gulbarga in Deccan whose grandson Hyder Ali, son of Fath Muhammad, later became the ruler of the Sultanate of Mysore.
