= Difa-e-Pakistan Council =

Umbrella coalition in Pakistan

Defence of Pakistan Council دفاعِ پاکستان کونسل
- Abbreviation: DPC (2011-); PADC (2001-2011)
- President: Ahmed Ludhianvi (2018-)
- Chairperson: Hamid-ul-Haq (2011-2025)
- Secretary-General: Siraj-ul-Haq
- Spokesperson: Abdul Rashid Ghazi (2001-2007)
- Founder: Sami-ul-Haq; Azam Tariq; Abdul Rashid Ghazi; Hamid Gul
- Founded: 2001 (as PADC); 2011 (as DPC)
- Succeeded by: Muttahida Majlis-e-Amal
- Ideology: Islamism; Pan-Islamism; Conservatism; Factions: Deobandism; Salafism; Islamic democracy Ahl-i Hadith; Ziaism
- Political position: Right-wing to far-right
- Religion: Islam

The Difa-e-Pakistan Council (Urdu: دفاعِ پاکستان کونسل, lit. Defence of Pakistan Council, abbreviated as DPC) formerly named Pakistan-Afghanistan Defense Council (Urdu: دفاعِ پاکستان افغانستان کونسل, abbreviated as PADC) is an umbrella coalition of more than 40 Pakistani Political and Religious right-wing groups.

The coalition advocated policies such as opposition to War in Afghanistan, closing NATO supply routes to Afghanistan and rejected granting India most-favored nation status.

The council is an alliance of right-wing groups, some of which are banned terrorist outfits and Muttahida Majlis-e-Amal was a breakaway group of the council formed in 2002. In 2001, Sami-ul-Haq was appointed the president of the council.

The organization includes leaders of Jamatud Dawa (JuD) and is led by Ahmed Ludhianvi, the leader of Sipah-e-Sahaba (SSP) and Fazlur Rehman Khalil, the founder of Harkat-ul-Mujahideen, is the vice president of the council.

== History ==
=== 2001 Establishment ===
In the wake of the September 11 attacks and the United States-led invasion of Afghanistan, a coalition of Pakistani political and Islamist figures established the Pakistan-Afghanistan Defense Council (PADC). The council served as a think tank and coordinating body for groups opposed to the war and founding members included figures such as Sami-ul-Haq, Hamid Gul, Azam Tariq, and Abdul Rashid Ghazi. The organization was eventually dissolved, and its leading members joined the Muttahida Majlis-e-Amal (MMA), a unified coalition of religious parties, ahead of the 2002 general elections.

=== 2011 Reestablishment ===
The organization was reestablished in November 2011 in response to the deaths of 24 Pakistani soldiers who were killed by American gunships and warplanes along the Afghan border.

Pakistan closed NATO supply routes to Afghanistan after the strikes but reopened the routes in July 2012 when U.S. Secretary of State Hillary Clinton apologized. In response thousands of supporters rallied in Islamabad on 9 July 2012 in protest of the government's decision to reopen the lines.

==== 2011 Members ====
According to the council's website, 36 organizations or people are part of the DPC:

1. Jamiat Ulema-e-Islam (S) (Sami-ul-Haq and Hamid-ul-Haq)
2. Jamatud Dawa (Hafiz Muhammad Saeed)
3. Jamaat-e-Islami Pakistan (Siraj-ul-Haq)
4. Ahle Sunnat Wal Jamaat (Muhammad Ahmed Ludhianvi)
5. Jamiat Ulema-e-Pakistan (Shah Ovais Noorani)
6. Ansar ul Ummah (Fazal-ur-Rehman Khalil)
7. Sunni Ittehad Council (Sahibzada Hamid Raza)
8. Markazi Jamiat Ahle Hadith (Sajid Mir)
9. Jamiat Ahle-Hadith (Ibtisam Elahi Zaheer)
10. Pakistan Ulema Council (Tahir Mehmood Ashrafi)
11. JUI-N (Maulana Asmatullah)
12. AMTKN-International (M. Ilyas Chinoti)
13. Muslim Conference AJK (Sardar Atiq Ahmed)
14. Majlis-e-Ahrar-e-Islam (Abdul Latif Khalid Cheema)
15. Mohsinan-e-Pakistan (Abdul Qadeer Khan)
16. Pakistan Muslim League - Zia (Ijaaz ul Haq)
17. Awami Muslim League (Sheikh Rasheed Ahmed)
18. Sunni Ulema Council (Muhammad Ashraf Tahir)
19. Majlis-e-Ahrar-e-Islam (Syed Muhammad Kafeel Bukhari)
20. AMTKN (Ismail Shujabadi)
21. Tehreek-e-Ittehad (Hamid Gul)
22. Pakistan Water Movement (Nasr)
23. Tehreek-e-Hurmat Rasool (Amir Hamza)
24. DPC Secretary Gen (Muhammad Yaqoob Sheikh)
25. Tehreek-e-Azaadi Kashmir (Saifullah Mansoor)
26. Muslim League-Sher-e-Bangal (Dr. Sualeh Zahoor)
27. Christian Community (Yusuf)
28. Sikh Community (Sardar Shaam)
29. Hindu Community Lahore (Manohar Chand)
30. Hindu Community Khi (Ramesh Laal)
31. Jamiat Ittehad ul Ulema – Pakistan
32. Mutahida Jamiat Ahl-e-Hadith (Naeem Badshah)
33. Jamiat Ashat Tauheed sunnah (Tayyab Tahiri)

== See also ==
- Muttahida Majlis-e-Amal
- Ahle Sunnat Wal Jamaat
