= List of fatwas =

A fatwa (Arabic: فتوى) is a non-binding legal opinion in Islam, issued by an Islamically qualified religious law specialist, known as a mufti, on a specific issue. The following is a list of notable historical and contemporary fatwas.

== Pre-19th century ==
1504 Oran fatwa

The Oran fatwa was issued in 1504 to address the crisis that occurred when Islam was prohibited in Castile in 1500–1502, and Muslims in the realm were required to convert and conform to Christianity. The fatwa sets out detailed relaxations of the sharia (Islamic law) requirements, allowing the Muslims to conform outwardly to Christianity and perform acts that are ordinarily forbidden in Islamic law, if necessary to survive. It includes relaxed instructions for fulfilling the ritual prayers, the ritual charity, and the ritual ablution, and recommendations when obliged to violate Islamic law, such as worshipping as Christians, committing blasphemy, and consuming pork and wine. The fatwa enjoyed wide currency among Muslims and Moriscos (Muslims nominally converted to Christianity and their descendants) in Spain, but its influence was limited to that country.

1727 fatwa on non-religious books

Ruling by the Ottoman chief mufti solicited by the Ottoman ruler to lend religious legitimacy to the printing of nonreligious books.

== 19th century ==
1803 fatwa against Western colonialism

Ruling by Shah Abdul Aziz in India invoking the legal theory obliging Muslims to wage war against the rulers of lands under European domination.

1804 fatwa against Western colonialism

Ruling by Usman dan Fodio in West Africa invoking the legal theory obliging Muslims to wage war against the rulers of lands under European domination.

1845 on vaccinations

Ruling by the Ottoman chief mufti solicited by the Ottoman ruler to lend religious legitimacy to vaccination.

1891 fatwa against tobacco

Ruling by the Iranian Mirza Shirazi that prohibited smoking as long as the British tobacco monopoly was in effect, and led to the tobacco protest.

== 20th century ==
1904 fatwa against Western colonialism

Ruling by the Moroccan ulama on the obligation to dismiss of European experts hired by the Moroccan government.

1907 fatwa against Western colonialism

Ruling by the Moroccan ulama on the obligation to depose the sultan on accusation that he failed to mount a defense against French aggression.

1909 fatwa deposing Abdülhamid

When the Action Army entered Istanbul, a Fatwa was issued condemning Sultan Abdülhamid, and the parliament voted to dethrone him.

1914 fatwa supporting Ottoman 'jihad' in World War I

Ruling by the Ottoman Shaykh al-Islam supporting the Ottoman sultan's proclamation of jihad to mark the entry of the Ottoman Empire into World War I.

1922 fatwa deposing Sultan Vahideddin

Mehmed VI was deposed as Sultan of the Ottoman Empire and Caliph, on a fatwa from the commissar for religious affairs.

1933 fatwa against Zionist products

Ruling by Iraqi ulama in 1933 calling on Muslims to boycott Zionist products.

1947 fatwa calling for jihad on Zionism

On December 2, 1947, the University of Al-Azhar religious scholars, the most respected in the Sunni Muslim world, called for jihad against the Zionists.

1951 fatwa on soft drinks

In September 1951, the mufti of Egypt issued a fatwa stating that both Coca-Cola and Pepsi-Cola were permissible for Muslims to drink. In order to arrive at that decision, the Department of Fatwas had the Ministry of Public Health analyze the composition of the two drinks. As they did not find the pepsin or any narcotic or alcoholic substances to be present, nor any "microbes harmful to health", the mufti found that it was not forbidden under Islamic law.

1959 fatwa on Jafari (Shia) jurisprudence

On July 6, 1959, Egypt's Sheikh Shaltout issued the al-Azhar Shia fatwa opining that: "The Jafari fiqh of the Shi'a is a school of thought that is religiously correct to follow in worship as are other Sunni schools of thought."

1974 fatwa on the Ahmadiyyah community

In April 1974 the Muslim World League issued a fatwa stating that followers of the Ahmadiyyah movement are to be considered "non-Muslims".

1980 fatwa on singing

In 1980, the Grand Imam of al-Azhar Gad al-Haq Ali Gad al-Haq issued a fatwa that "Listening to music, attending musical gatherings, and studying music of all genres and instruments is allowed as long as it is not accompanied with immoral and sinful acts, or used as a pretext to incite people towards haram (prohibited) behaviour, and it does not preoccupy a person away from observing the obligatory acts of worship (al-wajibat)".

1990s fatwa on nuclear weapons

It refers to the fatwa against the acquisition, development and use of nuclear weapons by Ayatollah Ali Khamenei. While the fatwa originally dates back to the mid-1990s, the first public issue of it is reported to be that of October 2003, which was followed by an official statement at a meeting of the International Atomic Energy Agency (IAEA) in Vienna, two years later in August 2005.

The fatwa has received criticism regarding its existence, applicability, and constancy. According to Khalaji, Khamenei may alter his fatwa under critical circumstances, in a similar manner as Khomeini did. While, according to Gareth Porter in Foreign Policy, Iran has sincerely banned the atomic bombs considering the "historical episode during its eight-year war with Iraq", when Iran never sought revenge for Iraqis chemical attacks killing 20,000 Iranians and severely injuring 100,000 more. Also, the fatwa is considered consistent with Islamic tradition.

1989 fatwa on Salman Rushdie

One of the first well-known fatwas was proclaimed in 1989 by the Iranian Ayatollah Ruhollah Khomeini, against Salman Rushdie over his novel The Satanic Verses.

1992 fatwa on Farag Foda

In June 1992, Egyptian writer Farag Foda was assassinated following a fatwa issued by ulamas from Al-Azhar who had adopted a previous fatwa by Sheikh al-Azhar, Jadd al-Haqq, accusing Foda and other secularist writers of being "enemies of Islam". The jihadist group Al-Gama'a al-Islamiyya claimed responsibility for the murder.

1996 anti-American fatwa

Issued by Osama bin Laden and Al-Qaeda. A 'Declaration of War against the Americans Occupying the Land of the Two Holy Places'.

1998 anti-American fatwa

Signed by the 'World Islamic Front for Jihad Against Jews and Crusaders' (Al-Qaeda). The five signatories were Osama bin Laden, Ayman al-Zawahiri, Ahmed Refai Taha, Mir Hamzah, and Fazlur Rehman. Decries America and Israel. Followed shortly after by the 1998 United States embassy bombings.

1998 fatwa on Abdulaziz Sachedina

In 1998, Grand Ayatollah Sistani of Iraq issued a fatwā prohibiting University of Virginia professor Abdulaziz Sachedina from ever again teaching Islam due in part to Sachedina's writings encouraging acceptance of religious pluralism in the Muslim world.

== 21st century ==
=== 2000s ===
2004 fatwa against Israeli/US goods

Yusuf al-Qaradawi released a fatwā on April 14, 2004, stating that the boycott of American and Israeli products was an obligation for all who are able, in support of the Palestinian cause.

2005 fatwa against al-Qaeda

Spanish Muslims proclaimed a fatwa against Osama bin Laden in March 2005 issued by Mansur Escudero Bedate, Secretary General of the Islamic Commission of Spain. The ruling says that Bin Laden and "his" al-Qaeda had abandoned their religion and should thus be called "al-Qaeda terrorists" without using the adjective "Islamic". The fatwa urges other Muslims to make similar proclamations. They were followed in July 2005 by the Fiqh Council of North America, a ruling council that issued a fatwa against providing support to "terrorist" groups that make up their own rules by unjustifiably referring to Islam (see Istihlal).

2005 fatwa against religious pluralism, liberalism, and secularism

2005 Amman Message (fatwa against extremist ideology)

The Amman Message was a statement signed in 2005 in Jordan by nearly 200 prominent Islamic jurists to serve as a "counter-fatwa" against a widespread use of takfir (excommunication) by jihadist groups to justify jihad against rulers of Muslim-majority countries. The Amman Message recognized eight legitimate schools of Islamic law and prohibited declarations of apostasy against them. The statement also re-asserted that fatwas can be issued only by properly trained muftis.

2007 fatwa on nuclear energy

In September 2007, the Central Java division and Jepara branch of the Indonesian organisation Nahdlatul Ulama (the Awakening of the Religious Scholars) declared the government's proposal to build a nuclear power station nearby at Balong on the Muria peninsula haram or forbidden. The fatwā was issued following a two-day meeting of more than a hundred ulama to consider the pros and cons of the proposal addressed by government ministers, scientists and critics. The decision cited both positive and negative aspects of the proposal, which it had balanced to make its judgment. Key concerns were the question of long-term safe disposal and storage of radioactive waste, the potential local and regional environmental consequences of the plant's operation, the lack of financial clarity about the project, and issues of foreign technological dependence.

2008 fatwa on smoking

In 2008, Syrian Grand Mufti Ahmad Badruddin Hassoun issued a fatwa prohibiting every type of smoking, including cigarettes and narghile, as well as the selling and buying of tobacco and any affiliation with tobacco distribution (see also smoking in Syria).

2008 fatwa on President Asif Ali Zardari

In 2008, a Pakistani religious leader issued a fatwā on President Asif Ali Zardari for "indecent gestures" toward Sarah Palin, U.S. vice presidential candidate.

2008 fatwa against terrorism

In 2008, Indian Ulama from the world-renowned seminary of Deoband have categorically issued a fatwā against terrorism and mentioned that any sort of killing of innocent people or civilians is haram (forbidden). The fatwā also clarified that there is no jihad in Kashmir or against India as freedom of religion is guaranteed by the state as any state that guarantees freedom of religion cannot have jihad sanctioned against it. This fatwā was reiterated in 2009 where Indian Home Minister P. Chidrambram hailed the move.

2009 Deoband fatwa against the Taliban

Deoband Ulama in India have repeatedly mentioned that the Taliban government in Afghanistan was un-Islamic. This was most recently reiterated at a convention in Karachi in 2009. These include the idea of establishing shariah rule with force in the name of Jihad and levying of jizya on Sikh citizens of Pakistan, which was termed as nothing more than extortion by armed gangs.

=== 2010s ===
2010 fatwa on singing

In June 2010, Shaikh Adil al-Kalbani, former imam of the Grand Mosque in Makkah (Masjid al-Haram) issued a fatwa that "There is no clear-cut religious ruling that says singing and music are not permissible in Islam".

2010 Deoband fatwa against female employment

The Darul Uloom Deoband issued a fatwa "It is unlawful for Muslim women to do job in government or private enterprises where men and women work together and women have to talk to men frankly and without a veil". However, after an angry reaction from other clerics, the media and women's groups, it clarified that it only insists women must be "covered properly".

2010 fatwa on Sunni-Shia relations

On 30 September 2010, Ayatollah Ali Khamenei issued a fatwa against insulting revered Sunni figures following the insult of Aisha by Yasser Al-Habib.

2010 fatwa against terrorism and suicide bombings

The Fatwa on Terrorism is a 600-page Islamic decree against terrorism and suicide bombings released in March 2010. This fatwa is a direct refutation of the ideology of Al-Qaeda and the Taliban. It is one of the most extensive rulings, an "absolute" condemnation of terrorism without "any excuses or pretexts" which goes further than ever and declares terrorism as kufr under Islamic law. It was produced in Canada by an influential Muslim scholar Dr Muhammad Tahir-ul-Qadri and was launched in London on March 2, 2010. Dr Qadri said during the launch "Terrorism is terrorism, violence is violence and it has no place in Islamic teaching and no justification can be provided for it, or any kind of excuses or ifs or buts." According to CNN, experts see the fatwa as a significant blow to terrorist recruiting.

2011 fatwa on Muammar al-Gaddafi

In 2011, an Egyptian Muslim cleric, Yusuf al-Qaradawi, issued a fatwa that urged soldiers to kill Muammar al-Gaddafi, the leader of Libya, if they were able to do so.

2012 fatwa on the pyramids

In 2012, Sheikh Murgan Salem al-Gohary of Egypt, a former Taliban, issued a fatwa calling for "the destruction of the Sphinx and the Giza Pyramids in Egypt", because "God ordered Prophet Mohammed to destroy idols."

2012 Saudi fatwa on foreign media

In 2012, Abdul-Azeez ibn Abdullaah Aal ash-Shaikh, the Grand Mufti of Saudi Arabia, issued a religious edict prohibiting contact and cooperation with foreign media outlets because they seek to "spread chaos and strife in Muslim lands". He added that contacting foreign media outlets to "divulge the country's secrets or address various matters" was tantamount to "treason and major crime". He said that "It is not permissible and is considered betrayal and assistance to the enemies of Islam." Also, "A believer has to help keeping security, that of his nation and community, and protecting his religion."

2012 fatwa on fasting under midnight sun

As the 2012 Ramadan fell under the northern summer, causing Muslims near or north of the Arctic Circle to be unable to eat for weeks, a fatwa by Dr. Abdullah Bin Abdul-Aziz Almosleh was implemented so that if the hours of sunlight exceeds 20 hours, Muslims could follow the time of Mecca.

2012 Indonesian fatwa on Christmas greetings

In 2012, the Indonesian Ulema Council issued an edict for Muslims not to wish Christians a happy Christmas. The edict said that wishing a happy Christmas was akin to confirming the "misguided" teachings of Christianity.

2013 fatwa on singing

In 2013, the grand mufti of Kashmir Bashir-ud-din Farooqi issued a fatwā terming singing as un-Islamic, forcing Kashmir's only all-girls rock band to abandon it.

2013 fatwa on Hamed Abdel-Samad

On 7 June 2013, Egyptian cleric and Al-Azhar professor Mahmoud Shaaban accused Hamed Abdel-Samad of committing "heresy", and stated that "he must be killed for being a heretic ... if he refuses to recant" statements from his book and lectures on Islamic Fascism. Shaaban also stated that "after he has been confronted with the evidence, his killing is permitted if the [Egyptian] government does not do it." On the same day, the Egyptian Sheikh Assem Abdel Maged declared a fatwa against the publicist. The German Federal Government called on the Egyptian government to guarantee freedom of expression and personal safety and summoned the Egyptian Chargé d'Affaires in Berlin.

2013 fatwa on terrorism and suicide bombings

On July 2, 2013, in Lahore, 50 Muslim scholars of the Sunni Ittehad Council (SIC) issued a collective fatwa against suicide bombings, the killing of innocent people, bomb attacks, and targeted killings declaring them as haram or forbidden.

2014 fatwa against illegal hunting and wildlife trade (Indonesia)

In March 2014 the Indonesian Council of Ulama (Indonesia's highest Islamic clerical body) issued a fatwa against illegal hunting and wildlife trafficking. The fatwa instructed Muslims to protect endangered species by conserving their habitat and stopping illegal trade. The World Wide Fund for Nature described the fatwa as a positive step.

2014 fatwa against ISIS

On August 27, 2014, Sheikh Abubakr Ahmad, the current Grand Mufti of India is issued the first fatwa against ISIS.

2015 fatwa against terrorism

In December 2015, about 70,000 clerics of Dargah Aala Hazrat in India issued a fatwa against terrorism and terrorist organizations like ISIS, Taliban and Al Qaeda and said these organization were not Islamic organizations.

2015 fatwa against ISIS

On March 11, 2015, Syed Soharwardy, the founder of the Islamic Supreme Council of Canada, and 37 other Muslim leaders of various Islamic sects from across Canada gathered in Calgary and issued a fatwa condemning followers of the Islamic State (ISIS) as non-Muslims. Soharwardy cited capturing opponents and beheading them, killing Muslims who disagree with ISIS's actions, destroying mosques, burning enemy soldiers alive and encouraging Muslim girls to join ISIS, among others, as acts by ISIS that violate Islamic law. Under this fatwa, anybody who even wishes to join the group will be "excommunicated from the Muslim community" and no longer considered Muslim.

2016 Fatwa of Peace for Humanity

2017 fatwa on suicide bombings

In 2017, suicide bombing in any form has also been declared haram by Indian ulama. This stand is also supported by Saudi scholars such as Shaykh Muhammad Bin Saalih al-'Uthaymeen, who have issued fatwā declaring suicide bombings are haram and those who commit this act are not shaheed (martyrs).

2018 fatwa against MMR vaccine (Indonesia)

In August 2018, The Indonesian Ulema Council issued a fatwa declaring the MMR (Measles, Mumps and Rubella) vaccine as haram, and claimed the vaccine contains traces of pork and human cells.

=== 2020s ===
2020 fatwa against visiting Al-Aqsa Mosque via 'normalized' aviation routes

The Palestinian Authority's Grand Mufti issued a fatwa banning Muslims from visiting al-Aqsa Mosque having arrived through Israeli airports by means of aviation agreements signed within the context of 'normalization' deals between Israel and Arab Gulf states.

2020 fatwa against normalization with Israel (Sudan)

Sudan's Islamic Fiqh Council, the country's highest religious authority, issued a fatwa against normalization with Israel.

2021 fatwa against normalization with Israel, call for jihad (Mauritania)

A fatwa signed by over 200 Mauritanian Muslim clerics called normalization with Israel 'A Betrayal Of Allah, His Messenger And The Muslims' and that jihad against Israel was a religious duty.

2022 fatwa against homosexuality (South Africa)

In July 2022, the South African Muslim Judicial Council (MJC) issued a fatwa on homosexuality. The fatwa clarified that Islam's primary sources of legislation are the Qur’an, Sunnah and Ijma – or scholarly consensus – all of which "unequivocally prohibit same-sex actions and, by extension, same-sex marriage".

2023 fatwa calling for military intervention by Arab and Muslim countries against Israel and for Gaza (Qatar)

On October 31, 2023, The International Union of Muslim Scholars (IUMS), in a fatwa, urged all Arab and Muslim nations to support Hamas in its military campaign against Israel, as well as the Palestinian resistance groups in the West Bank and Israel, as well as the nations that border Israel, such as Egypt, Jordan, Syria, and Lebanon.

2023 fatwa boycotting Israel-linked firms (Indonesia)

On November 10, 2023, a fatwa issued by the Indonesian Ulema Council called for the boycott of pro-Israel goods as a show of support to Palestine.

2023 fatwa for Gazans against Israel (Turkey)

On November 16, 2023, Turkey's governmental Directorate of Religious Affairs muftis meeting issued a 10-item declaration forbidding Muslims to support Israel: "Remaining indifferent to oppression and injustice, staying silent in the face of tyrants and traitors, is directly or indirectly supporting oppressors, occupiers, terrorists and killers. Supporting those who support them is also forbidden." The directorate's president earlier on November 13 said "Millions taking to the streets for Gaza and Palestine are an intifada of humanity against brutal Zionism."

2025 fatwa of jihad against Israel

On 28 March 2025, scholars from the International Union of Muslim Scholars issued a fatwa that stated, "jihad against the [Israeli] occupation is an individual obligation upon every capable Muslim" while calling upon every Muslim government to "intervene immediately" through military, economic and political means. In response, the Grand Mufti of Egypt, Nazir Ayyad, rejected the fatwa and called the action "irresponsible". He added that such actions may "endanger the security of societies and the stability of Muslim states."

== See also ==
- Islamic schools and branches
- Madhhab
- Schools of Islamic theology
- Sunni fatwas on Shias
