= Muawiya Azam =

Pakistani politician (born 1983)

Mawlana Muawiya Azam
- معاویہ اعظم
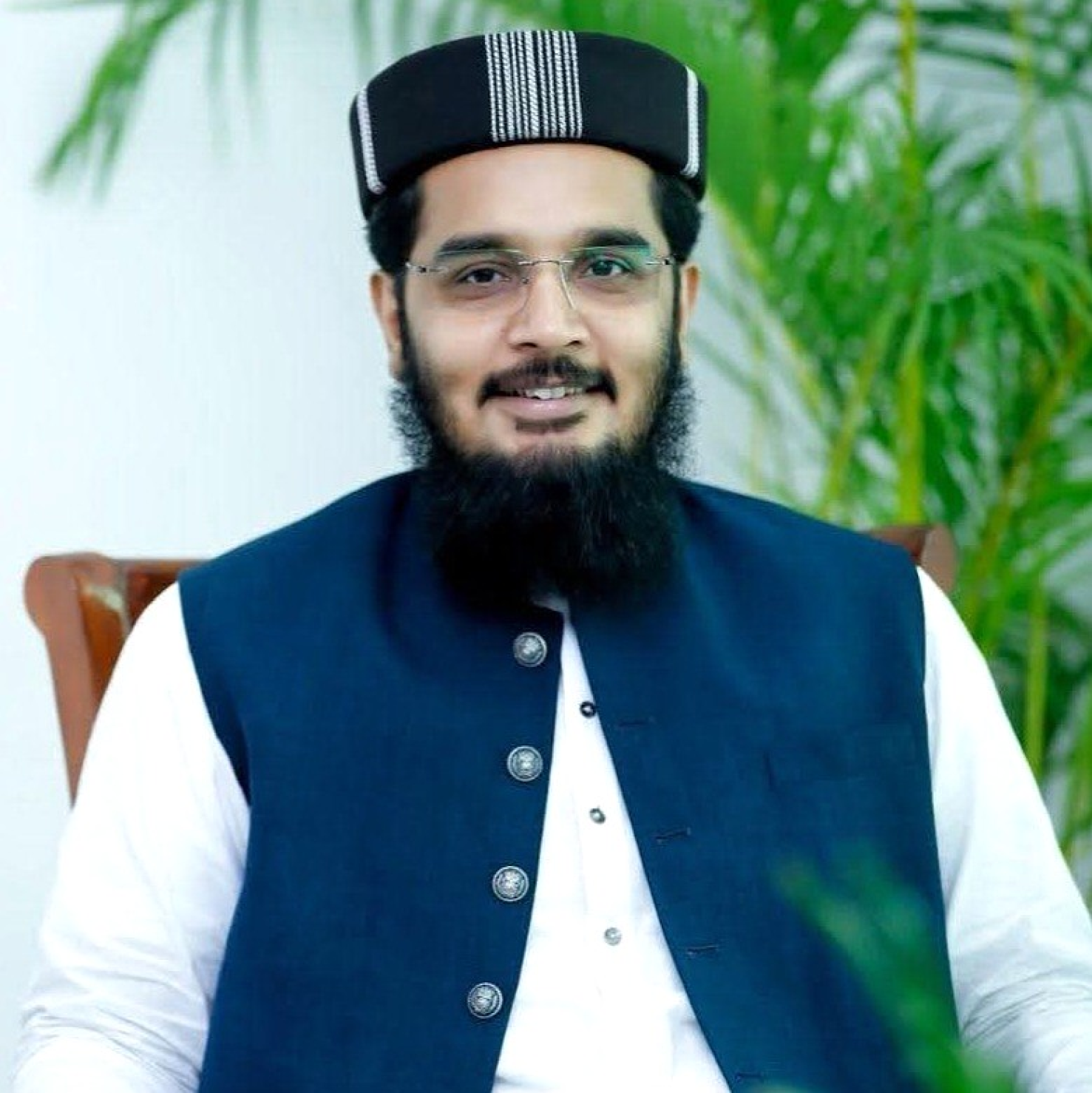

Member of the Provincial Assembly of the Punjab
- Incumbent
- Assumed office 15 August 2018
- Constituency: PP-126 Jhang-III

Personal details
- Born: 28 August 1983 (age 43) Chichawatni, Pakistan
- Party: PRHP (2012–present)
- Parent: Azam Tariq (father)
- Education: Darul Uloom Zakariyya

Muhammad Muawiya Azam Tariq (Note: Urdu: محمد معاویہ اعظم طارق) (born 28 August 1983) is a Pakistani Islamic cleric and far-right politician who served as member of the Provincial Assembly of the Punjab from 2018 to 2023. Muawiya Azam is also a senior leader of the Ahle Sunnat Wal Jamaat (ASWJ) and Pakistan Rah-e-Haq Party (PRHP).

The son of Sipah-e-Sahaba chief Azam Tariq, Muawiya Azam is known for his anti-Shia sentiment and is listed in the Fourth Schedule List under Anti-Terrorism Act 1997. Nevertheless, he remains a popular figure within Jhang District, the headquarters of his father's activities in the past.

== Early life ==
Muhammad Muawiya Azam Tariq was born on 28 August 1983 in Chichawatni, Punjab, Pakistan into a Manj Rajput family. His father, Azam Tariq, was a prominent Sunni cleric and the leader of Sipah-e-Sahaba from 1997 until his assassination in 2003.

Muawiya Azam was educated in Islamic studies in Multan at the time of his father's assassination. He later obtained the degree of Master of Arts in Islamic Studies from Zakariyya International Islamic University in South Africa.

== Political career ==
He was elected to the Provincial Assembly of the Punjab as an independent candidate from Constituency PP-127 (Jhang-III) in the 2018 Punjab provincial election. He received 65,252 votes and defeated fellow independent candidate, Sheikh Sheraz Akram. Pakistan Tehreek-e-Insaf (PTI) and Pakistan Muslim League – N (PML–N) both offered him to join the party but he instead joined Pakistan Rah-e-Haq Party (PRHP).

Muawiya Azam led demands for a university to be established in Jhang.

== Controversies ==
Muawiya Azam was arrested in January 2016 on charges on terrorism and was released more than a year later on 30 July 2017. In 2018, the Election Commission of Pakistan (ECP) rejected petitions for his disqualification.

Despite being listed in the Fourth Schedule List under Anti-Terrorism Act 1997, Azam was able to travel to Europe in 2023.

In June 2026, Muawiya Azam was among the list of Sunni clerics banned from delivering speeches in Attock due to Shia-led Muharram processions.
