= Mir Hamzah =

Pakistani Islamic jihadist

Mir Hamzah or Shaykh Mir Hamzah is a Pakistani Islamic jihadist who was one of the five signatories of a 1998 fatwa from Osama bin Laden and the World Islamic Front (Al-Qaeda). He was identified as the secretary of the Jamiat-ul-Ulema-e-Pakistan.

== See also ==
- History of Pakistan
- List of fatwas
