= Tibba Shah Behlol =

Pakistani village

- Town
- Location within Pakistan
- Coordinates: 32°13′7.32″N 73°35′11.148″E
- Country: Pakistan
- Province: Punjab
- District: Hafizabad

Area
  - Total: 25 km^{2} (9.7 sq mi)
- Elevation: 210 m (690 ft)
- Time zone: UTC+5 (PST)
- Calling code: 0547

Tibba Shah Behlol is a town near Pindi Bhattian, situated along the Chiniot-Lahore road at the coordinates 31.8450° N and 73.2104° E. The town is renowned for its association with the great Sufi master Shaikh Bahlol Daryai, after whom it was named.

The term "Tibba" refers to a raised area of land, and the town's name honors Sheikh Bahlol Qadri (d. 983 AH/1575), who resided there and whose shrine is also located at the site.

To understand the significance of the place, it is essential to explore the life and legacy of Sheikh Bahlol, which explains why the town was named in his honor.

== Background ==
The historical book Haqiqat ul Fuqara (for reference, please see the text on www.rekhta.org), authored by Sheikh Syed Mahmood, also known as Syed Muhammad Pir, in 1072 AH/1666, provides a concise yet detailed biography of the renowned saint Sheikh Bahlol Qadri.
