= Chund =

- town
- Location within Pakistan
- Coordinates: 31°25′01″N 72°15′45″E
- Country: Pakistan
- Province: Punjab
- District: Jhang
- Elevation: 152 m (499 ft)
- Time zone: UTC+5 (PST)

Chund (Chund Bhaiwāna) is a town of Jhang District in Punjab Province of Pakistan. It lies at the intersection of two main highways, the Jhang–Lalian road and Jhang–Sargodha road. Chund is situated between two rivers, the Jhehlum and the Chenab. People intending to visit towns like Shah Jewana, Marri Gujjraan, Pir Kot, Salyana, Chela, Jhagar, Haveli Sheikh Rajoo, Kala Baali, Lalian, and Pind Hassan Khan pass through Chund.

== See also ==
- Chund railway station
- Rivaz Bridge
