= Tomb of Heer Ranjha =

Historic monument and mausoleum in Jhang, Pakistan

- مقبرہ ہیر رانجھے دا (Punjabi)
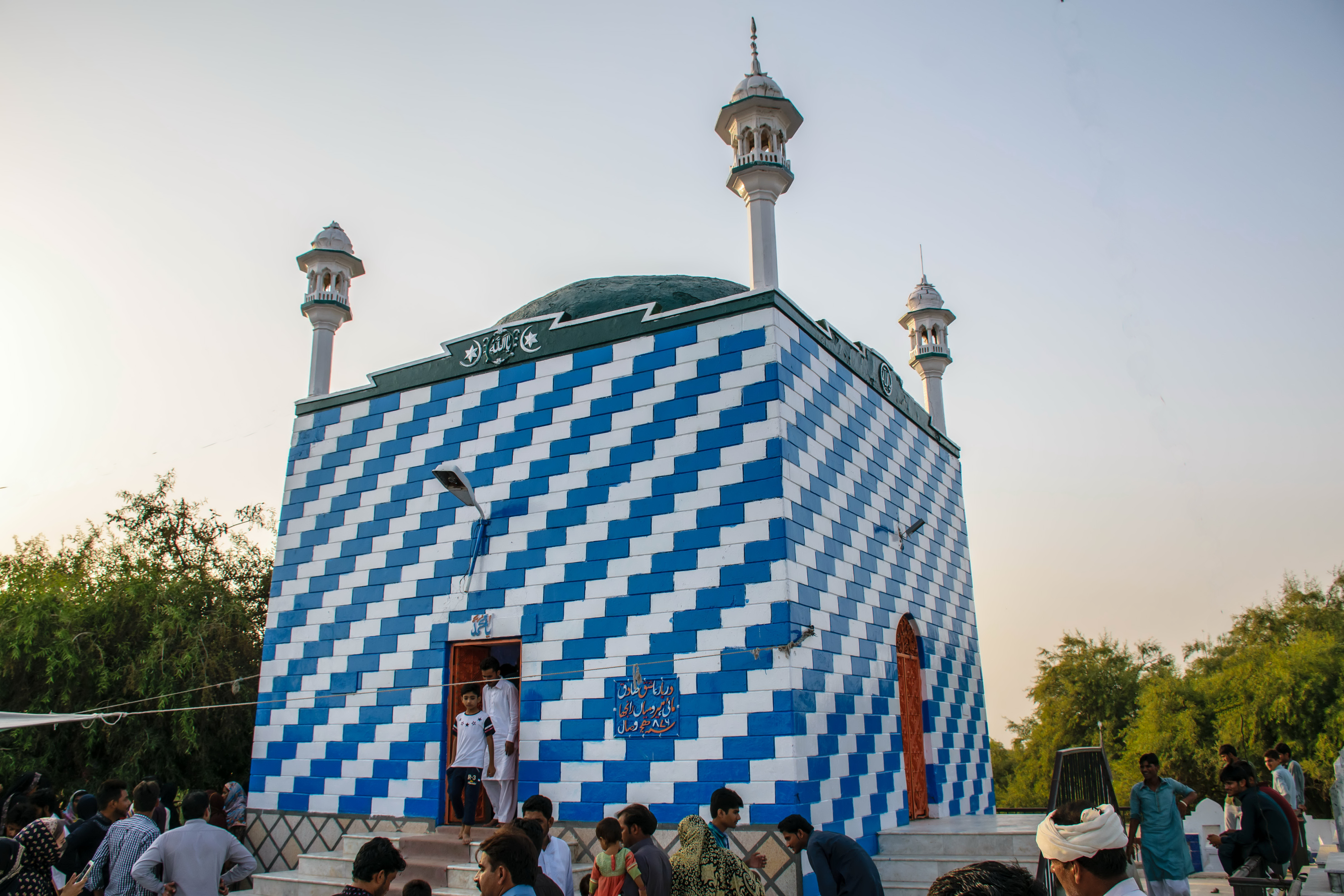
- Heer and Ranjha's tomb at Jhang
- Interactive map of Tomb of Heer Ranjha
- 31°16′31″N 72°20′13″E
- Type: Historic monument & mausoleum
- Location: Jhang, Punjab, Pakistan

History
- Built: 1471 CE

Site notes
- Architectural style: Islamic
- Governing body: Punjab Culture Department
- Owner: Government of Pakistan

The Tomb of Heer Ranjha (Punjabi: مقبرہ ہیر رانجھے دا, romanized: Maqbarā(h) Hīr Rānj(h)ē Dā) is a 15th-century historic monument and presumed mausoleum of Heer Syal and Dheedo Ranjha, from the traditional Punjabi folk tragedy of Heer Ranjha, situated in Jhang, Punjab, Pakistan.

Heer and Ranjha is one of several popular romantic works of folklore from the Indian subcontinent. There are several poetic narrations of the tragic story, the most famous being Heer by Waris Shah written in 1766. Jhang was Heer's home, therefore they were buried here. Every year during Muharram the Urs is held at the tomb.

== History ==
The exact time period of Heer and Ranjha's life is not known, however it is assumed that they lived during fifteenth century in Punjab in modern day Pakistan. The plaque at the tomb mentions 876 AH, as year of their death, which corresponds to 1471 AD. An exact date of tomb's construction is not known, it is believed that the tomb was constructed some time after their death.

== Architecture ==
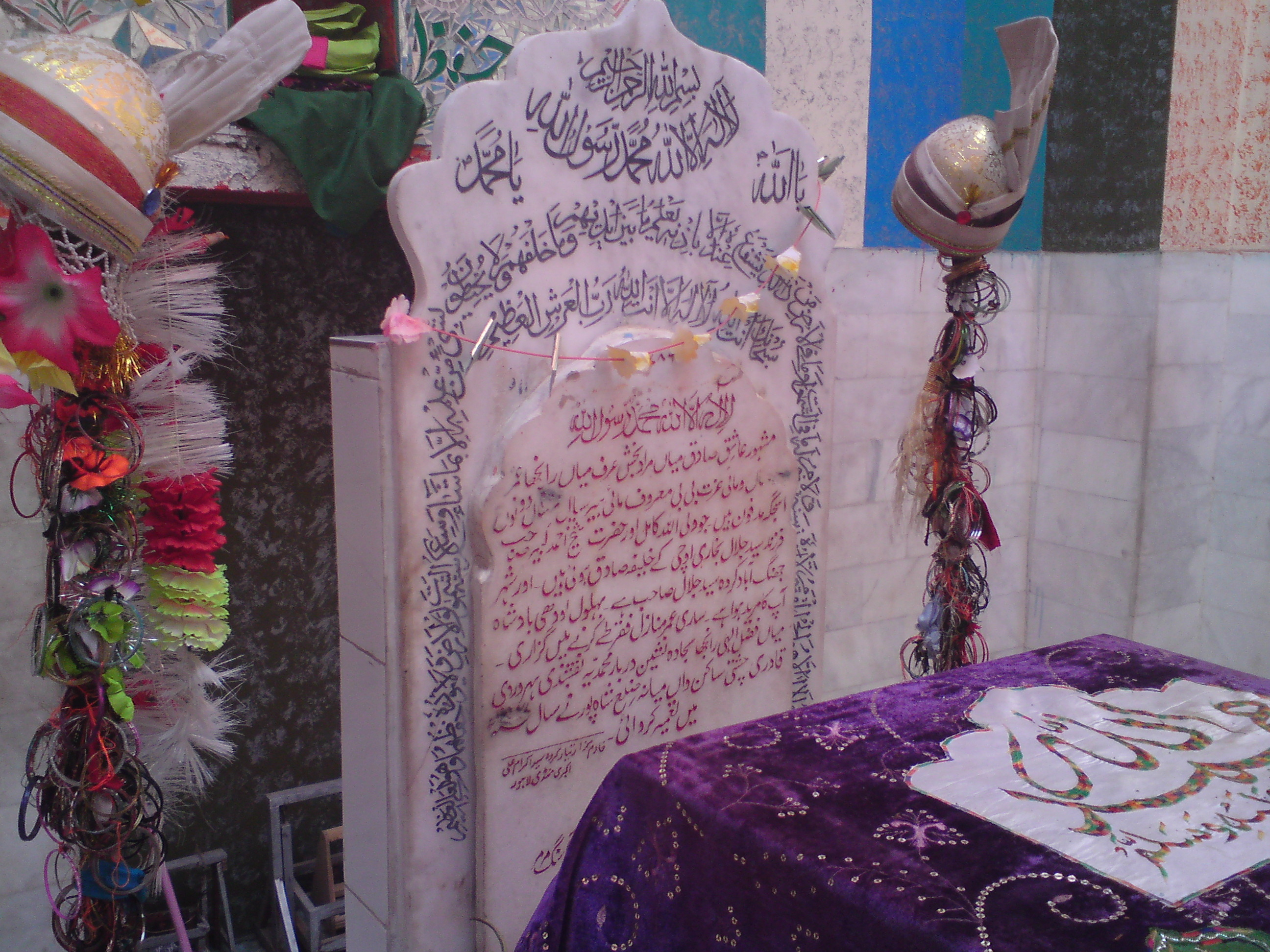
Heer Ranjha's tombstone

The tomb is built in Islamic architectural style and features a dome and small turrets at the four corners. The dome reaches little more than a foot above the spring of the arch and features a cupola in its roof. Both Heer and Ranjah are buried in a single grave inside the tomb. The grave is decorated with tiles and is marked by a marble tombstone.

== Location ==
The tomb is located in Jhang city in Punjab, Pakistan near Faisalabad road and Railway line. It is also close to Mai Heer ground and Nawaz Sharif stadium and the new sport complex.

== See also ==
- Mirza Sahiba
- Sohni Mahiwal
- Laila Majnu
