= Fazlur Rehman Khalil =

Pakistani Islamist militant leader (born 1959)

- فضل الرحمن خليل

Emir of Ansar-ul-Umma
- Incumbent
- Assumed office 2004
- Preceded by: None (office created)

Vice President of Difa-e-Pakistan Council
- Incumbent
- Assumed office 2012
- Leader: Sami-ul-Haq (2012-2018); Ahmed Ludhianvi (2018–)

Emir of Harkat-ul-Mujahideen
- In office 1996–2000
- Preceded by: Sajjad Afghani
- Succeeded by: Farooq Kashmiri

Personal details
- Born: 1963 (age 62–63) Dera Ismail Khan, Pakistan
- Party: Ansar-ul-Umma
- Education: Jamia Uloom-ul-Islamia

Military service
- Battles/wars: Soviet-Afghan War; War in Afghanistan; Insurgency in Jammu and Kashmir; Indian Airlines Flight 814; Siege of Lal Masjid

Fazlur Rehman Khalil (Urdu: فضل الرحمن خليل c. 1963) is Pakistani militant leader who founded the Harkat-ul-Mujahideen (HuM). He is the current leader of both the Difa-e-Pakistan Council and Ansar-ul-Umma, a front organization of the HuM. He also runs the Jamia Khalid Bin Walid, an Islamic seminary located in Islamabad’s Golra district town which has been accused of supporting the Tehrik-i-Taliban Pakistan.

He is sanctioned as a Specially Designated Global Terrorist under the Specially Designated Nationals and Blocked Persons List by the United States Department of the Treasury's Office of Foreign Assets Control; where he is listed as a mawlānā and qāriʾ born in 1963 in Pakistan with addresses in Rawalpindi and Islamabad. Khalil was also suspected of having masterminded the hijacking of Indian Airlines Flight 814.

He is considered to be close to the Afghan Taliban and former Pakistani Prime Minister Imran Khan.

== Early life ==
Fazal ur Rehman was born into a Pashtun family in 1963 in Dera Ismail Khan, Pakistan.

He was a student at Jamia Naumania, a madrassa in Dera Ismail Khan, when he left to join the Afghan jihad in 1981, at the age of 16, without telling his parents, while in Afghanistan he'd fight in the ranks of commanders Jalaluddin Haqqani and Yunus Khalis as well meeting Osama bin Laden, who would become a long-time friend.

He later returned to Pakistan and completed his dars-e-nizami studies at Jamia Uloom-ul-Islamia, Karachi.

== Militant activities ==
=== Harkat-ul-Jihad al-Islami ===
In 1980, He co-founded Harkat-ul-Jihad al-Islami (HuJI) alongside Qari Saifullah Akhtar; both were graduates of the Jamia Uloom-ul-Islamia in Karachi.

He alongside Sajjad Afghani, later split from HuJI to establish and lead a splinter group, Harkat-ul-Mujahedeen (HuM).

In February 2000, He stepped down as emir of HuM and his second-in-command, Farooq Kashmiri, assumed leadership of the group.

=== Al Qaeda fatwa ===
He was a signatory of the February 1998 fatwa issued by Osama bin Laden and Ayman al-Zawahiri under the banner of the "World Islamic Front." This declaration, titled "Jihad Against Jews and Crusaders," is widely considered the founding manifesto of al-Qaeda.

During an interview with the BBC News, Khalil denied any continued association with militant groups, asserting that such ties had concluded following the Afghan jihad. He refused to speak about Al Qaeda's 1998 fatwa, stating he would only discuss the matter if the interviewers could present him with a copy of the document.

=== Indian Airlines Flight 814 ===
Khalil was suspected of having masterminded the December 1999 hijacking of Indian Airlines Flight 814. Five hijackers from HuM, commandeered the flight en route from Kathmandu to Delhi, forcing it to land in Kandahar, Afghanistan. The crisis ended with the Indian government releasing three imprisoned militants including Masood Azhar, a former associate of Khalil, who however did not rejoin HuM. Instead, he founded the Jaish-e-Mohammed (JeM) in early 2000.

== Arrest ==
He was first detained by Pakistani authorities in May 2004. He was held for six months before being released due to insufficient evidence.

His case however resurfaced in June 2005 after Hamid and Umer Hayat, reported to the U.S. Federal Bureau of Investigation (FBI) that they had trained at an Al-Qaeda camp run by him. In the wake of these allegations, Rehman evaded capture by going into hiding.

== 2006 kidnapping ==
In In March 2006, Rehman and his driver were abducted by eight armed assailants from a mosque in Tarnol, approximately three miles northwest of Islamabad, while they were performing the Asr prayer. After being held for five hours and beaten, they were released on the outskirts of the city in front of a mosque.

== Siege of Lal Masjid ==
He was considered a close friend of the Lal Masjid's leader Abdul Rashid Ghazi. This relationship led the Pakistani government to task him with negotiating an end to the siege of Lal Masjid in July 2007.

In 2013, during a hearing of the murder case of Abdul Rashid Ghazi, Khalil recorded his statement to the court. He stated that Ghazi was amenable to a peaceful settlement and that he had persuaded him to agree to the government's demands, culminating in a five-point agenda to end the standoff and that Ghazi had also agreed to surrender, yet "Operation Sunrise" was carried out regardless.

== Difa-e-Pakistan Council ==
In 2012, he returned to public prominence by joining the Difa-e-Pakistan Council (DPC), a coalition of right-wing political and religious parties.

The coalition, which comprised various right-wing and religious parties, was established in the wake of the 2011 NATO attack in Pakistan, when a NATO airstrike killed several Pakistani military personnel. Among its constituent members were Jamaat-ud-Dawa and Sipah-e-Sahaba Pakistan.
