= Masood ur Rehman Usmani =

Pakistani Islamic scholar (1968–2024)

Mawlānā Masood ur Rehman Usmani
- مسعود الرحمان عثمانی

Central Secretary of Sunni Ulema Council (SUC)
- In office 2006 – 5 January 2024

Personal life
- Born: 1968 Shangla District, Khyber Pakhtunkhwa, Pakistan
- Died: 5 January 2024 Islamabad, Pakistan
- Cause of death: Assassination
- Citizenship: Pakistani
- Political party: Sipah-e-Sahaba Ahle-Sunnat-Wal-Jamat Sunni Ulema Council
- Education: Jamia Ashrafia; Darul Uloom Karachi

Religious life
- Religion: Islam
- Denomination: Sunni
- Jurisprudence: Hanafi
- Movement: Deobandi

Masood-ur-Rehman Usmani (Urdu: مسعود الرحمان عثمانی; c. 1968 – 5 January 2024) was a Pakistani Islamic scholar and political leader who served as the Central Secretary of Sunni Ulema Council.

He was a member of Ahlus Sunnah Wal Jamaat (ASWJ) and the Council of Islamic Ideology, a constituent body of Government of Pakistan.

He was assassinated on 5 January 2024 by an unknown person in Islamabad.

== Early life ==
Usmani was born in 1968 in the Shangla district of Khyber Pakhtunkhwa province, Pakistan.

He received his religious education at various madrasas, including Jamia Darul Uloom in Karachi and Jamia Ashrafia in Lahore and earned the distinguished title of "Maulana" by completing his Dars-e-Nizami scholarly program.

Usmani was arrested in April 2018 by unknown persons from Sharifabad area under Koral police station. After his disappearance, his supporters blocked the Islamabad Expressway. However, the circumstances surrounding his arrest are still unclear.

== Assassination and Funeral ==
Usmani was assassinated on 5 January 2024 by bike-borne shooters in Ghori Town, a suburb in Islamabad. He was taken to the hospital where doctors declared him dead.

Thousands of mourners attended his funeral, held a day after unidentified gunmen shot and killed him and wounded his driver, according to a statement issued by the Islamabad police.

=== Investigation ===
Immediately after the incident, a heavy police force reached the spot and cordoned off the area and an investigation has been started to arrest the accused.
