= Ghulam Raza Naqvi =

Pakistani politician

Maulana Syed Ghulam Raza Naqvi is one of the founders of the Pakistani Shia vigilante movement Sipah-e-Muhammad Pakistan (SMP), in the early 1990s (1994 in some sources), formed to counter and respond to Deobandi Sunni Muslim attacks.

Naqvi was educated in a Shia seminary in Najaf. He died whilst on a pilgrimage to the Imam Reza Shrine in Mashhad, Iran, on March 7, 2016.
