= Rivaz Bridge =

Rivaz Bridge ریواز پل
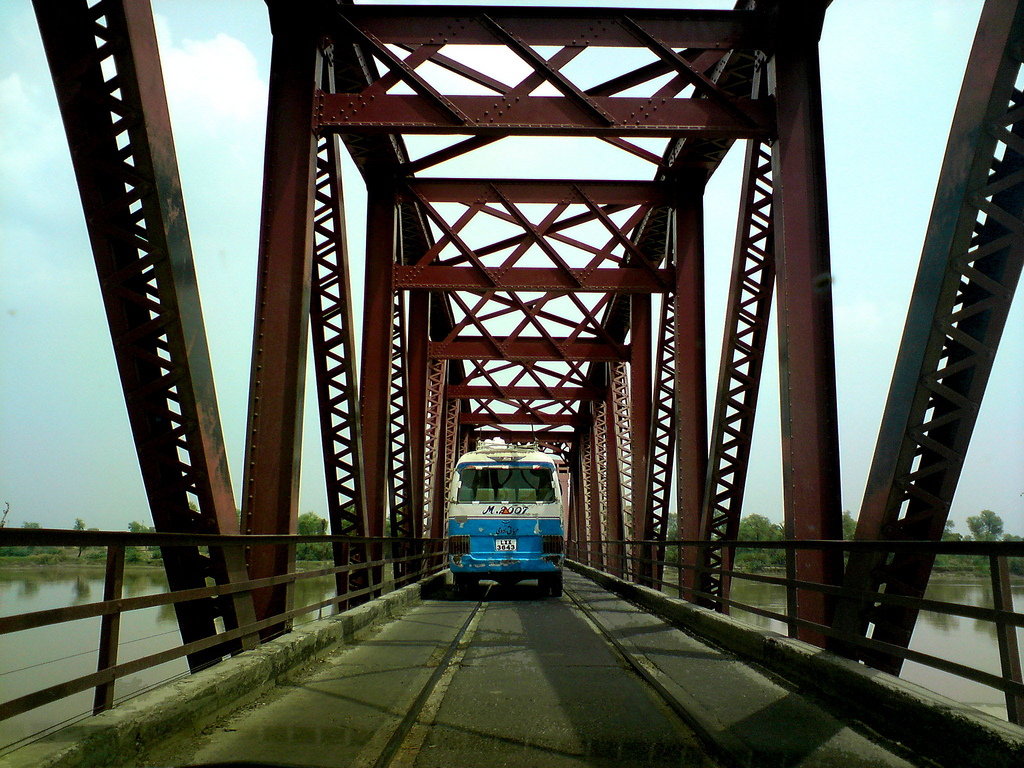
- Rivaz Bridge over the Chenab river
- Coordinates: 31°24′17″N 72°17′48″E
- Carries: Pedestrians, automobiles, rail and trucks
- Crosses: Chenab River
- Locale: Chund Bharwana, Jhang-Sargodha road
- Other name: Chund Pull
- Owner: Government

Characteristics
- Design: Beam
- Material: Concrete, metal
- Total length: 750 meters

History
- Constructed by: National Highway Authority

Location
- Interactive map of Rivaz Bridge

Rivaz Bridge, also known as Chund Bridge (Urdu: ریواز پل) is a bridge over the Chenab river. It is located near Chund, Jhang District, Pakistan. The bridge is 750 meters long. It is 14 km from Jhang.

== History ==
Built in 1905 during British India-era, Rivaz Bridge is among the oldest bridges in Pakistan.
