= Salim Khatri =

Pakistani religious leader

Mawlānā Salim Khatri

Personal life
- Born: c. 1965 Karachi, Pakistan
- Died: March 22, 2023 (aged 57–58) New Karachi Town, Karachi, Pakistan
- Cause of death: Assassination
- Political party: Sipah-e-Sahaba ASWJ Sunni Ulema Council

Religious life
- Religion: Islam
- Denomination: Sunni
- Jurisprudence: Hanafi
- Movement: Deobandi

Salim Khatri (Urdu: سلیم کھتری c. 1965 – 22 March 2023) was a Pakistani Islamic scholar and a political religious leader, considered to be an important figure for the Sunni Deobandi community in Karachi, who was well known for his opinions on religion and politics.

He was associated with the Ahle Sunnat Wal Jamaat (ASWJ) and Sunni Ulema Council, a religious and political organization in Pakistan and was a prominent figure within the organizations.

He was assassinated on 22 March 2023 by an unknown persons in Karachi.

== Assassination ==
On 22 March 2023, in Karachi, four people on two motorcycles shot Maulana Khatri five times while he was at a shop near his house in the area of the Bilal Colony of the New Karachi Town.

He was taken to the hospital but was pronounced dead. This was the second targeted killing in Karachi in two days, when a leader associated with the Sunni Ulema Council met a similar fate, being shot and killed near his home while returning from morning prayers, which made people worried about the city's safety.

=== Aftermath ===
A month later in April, Karachi police took swift action by apprehending three suspects believed to be connected to the murder. Inspector General (IG) Karachi, Javed Alam Odho, revealed that the police acted on intelligence received and organized a raid in New Karachi's Bilal Colony, successfully arresting the three individuals involved in what appeared to be a sectarian-targeted killing. Furthermore, He also raised concerns about a conspiracy that had been allegedly plotted during the Ramadan period, aimed at inciting sectarian violence. He went on to suggest that foreign intelligence agencies might have played a role in orchestrating such target killings within the city.

The news of Khatri's assassination brought a substantial gathering of ASWJ leaders and members to the hospital. They pointed fingers at anti-state elements' as the perpetrators of the attack and criticized the authorities for their inability to maintain law and order in the city. In response to this incident, protesters staged a demonstration that blocked the highway near the Edhi morgue at Sohrab Goth, where Khatri's body had been transported. This protest caused disruptions to traffic and concluded only after the police offered assurance that those responsible for the attack would face legal consequences. Many religious and political leaders were upset about Khatri's death. The ASWJ party blamed the government for the attack and accused it for not doing enough to protect the people.

== See also ==
- List of Deobandis
