= Muhammad Ahmed Ludhianvi =

Pakistani Islamic scholar and far-right politician

Mawlānā Muhammad Ahmad Ludhianvi محمد اَحْمَد لدھیانوی

Sarparast-e-Aala of Ahle Sunnat Wal Jamaat
- Incumbent
- Assumed office 2014
- Preceded by: Khalifa Abdul Qayyum

President of Difa-e-Pakistan Council
- Incumbent
- Assumed office 2018
- Preceded by: Sami-ul-Haq

Chief of Sipah-e-Sahaba
- In office 2009–2014
- Preceded by: Ali Sher Hyderi
- Succeeded by: Awrangzib Faruqi

Personal life
- Born: 10 November 1950 (age 75) Kamalia, Punjab, West Pakistan (present-day Punjab, Pakistan)
- Home town: Jhang and Kamalia
- Citizenship: Pakistani
- Political party: Rah-e-Haq Party; Sipah-e-Sahaba; Ahle Sunnat Wal Jamaat
- Education: Jamia Uloom-ul-Islamia; Jamia Qasim Ul Uloom

Religious life
- Religion: Islam
- Denomination: Sunni
- Jurisprudence: Hanafi
- Movement: Deobandi

Muslim leader
- Teacher: Mufti Mehmood

Muhammad Ahmad Ludhianvi (Urdu: محمد اَحْمَد لدھیانوی) is a Pakistani Islamic scholar and far-right politician who is the Sarparast-e-Aala of the Ahle Sunnat Wal Jama'at (ASWJ) and the President of Difa-e-Pakistan Council (DPC).

Ludhianvi had previously served as the chief of Sipah-e-Sahaba from 2009 to 2014 upon the death of Ali Sher Hyderi.

He was on the Pakistani legislature's list of persons with suspected ties to terrorism, but is considered as a moderate leader compared to the other leaders of ASWJ, and is also commonly referred as to "Safeer-e-Aman" (ambassador of peace) by his followers.

Ludhianvi has stated that he supports sectarian harmony, as long as it does not impede his group's goal of making Pakistan a Sunni Islamic state and declaring Shia a minority, like the Ahmadiyya in Pakistan.

== Education and family ==
Ludhianvi is the son of Hafiz Sadrud Din; who migrated in 1947 from Ludhiana district of Indian Punjab to Kamalia city of Pakistani Punjab. He belongs to a Punjabi Arain family.

He is related to the freedom fighter Maulana Abdul Qadir Ludhianvi. During the migration, his eldest brother died due to ailment; he was buried in the Indian Punjab.

He completed his early studies at Jamia Qasim Ul Uloom and graduated from Jamia Uloom-ul-Islamia, where he befriended Abdul Aziz Ghazi.

== Political career ==
He participated in election from Constituency NA-89 Jhang (Jhang-IV), in 2008 and 2013. He got 45,216 votes in 2008 while 71,598 votes in 2013. On 9 April 2014, he was declared as winner by an election tribunal, as his winning opponent Sheikh Mohammad Akram had been disqualified, but the decision was later cancelled by the Supreme Court of Pakistan when Akram's disqualification was waived.

In 2016, Ludhianvi was restricted to participate in bypoll election from PP-78 (Jhang) but in later he was allowed to participate by the Lahore High Court. However, he decided not to contest the election and Masroor Nawaz Jhangvi (a member of his organization) was elected as the member of Punjab Assembly.

== See also ==
- List of Deobandis
