= Masroor Nawaz Jhangvi =

Pakistani politician

Peer Mawlānā Masroor Nawaz Jhangvi
- مسرور نواز جھنگوی

Member of the Provincial Assembly of the Punjab
- In office 23 January 2017 – 31 May 2018
- Constituency: PP-79 (Jhang-VII)

Personal details
- Born: 17 January 1988 (age 38) Jhang, Punjab, Pakistan
- Party: JUI (F)
- Other political affiliations: ASWJ
- Parent: Haq Nawaz Jhangvi (father)
- Occupation: Politician
- Awards: National Peace Award (2016)

Masroor Nawaz Jhangvi (Urdu: مسرور نواز جھنگوی) is a Pakistani Islamic scholar who was a member of the Punjab Assembly from January 2017 to May 2018.

He is a son of Sipah-e-Sahaba founder Haq Nawaz Jhangvi and a member of Jamiat Ulema-e-Islam and Ahl-e-Sunnat Wal Jamaat (ASWJ).

== Political career ==
Masroor was elected as the member of the Punjab Assembly as independent. He later joined Jamiat Ulema-e-Islam (F) and was elected from PP-126 Jhang-II in by-polls election held in December 2016.

== Award ==
Jhangvi received a peace award from Minister for Religious Affairs Sardar Muhammad Yousaf at a national conference of peace held in Islamabad.

== See also ==
- List of Deobandis
