= Shafqat Tanvir Mirza =

Pakistani writer and journalist

- Born: 6 February 1932; Domeli, Jhelum District, Punjab (British India)
- Died: 20 November 2012 (aged 80); Lahore, Pakistan
- Occupations: Journalist, Writer
- Relatives: Tamkinat Ara (wife) (married in 1963); Tabashra Bano (daughter)
- Awards: Pride of Performance Award by the President of Pakistan in 2006

Shafqat Tanvir Mirza – known by many as STM (6 February 1932 – 20 November 2012) was a Pakistani writer and a journalist known for his activism for Punjabi culture and language. He was also a journalist union leader and was sent to jail twice because of his activities on behalf of newspapers he worked for.

== Early life and education ==
Belonging to a Jarral Rajput family that took the Mirza nobility title during the times of emperor Akbar, his ancestors belonged to Rajouri (now in Indian-administered Jammu and Kashmir), but Mirza himself was born in February 1932 the village of Domeli, in the Jhelum District (now in Punjab, Pakistan) while his father was born in Saman Burj, Wazirabad, into the royal Jarral exiled family, from where his father, a Range Officer in the Punjab Forest Department, was transferred to Jhelum.

Mirza studied at schools in Chakwal, Khushab, Wazirabad, Attock, Bahawalnagar and at Gordon College, Rawalpindi.

== Career ==
Mirza's earlier career centred on Rawalpindi, where he worked for the daily newspapers Tameer and Hilal, as well as at Radio Pakistan. In 1970, he joined Daily Musawat, subsequently moving on to Daily Imroze, where he became the editor. In the 1990s, Shafqat Tanvir Mirza joined the English language newspaper Dawn, where he contributed regular columns on Punjabi language and culture.

== Activities as an author and translator ==
Shafqat Tanvir Mirza was also active as an author, writing and translating a number of books. He wrote in Urdu, Punjabi and English.

- Tehreek-i-Azadi Vich Punjab da Hissa (Punjabi)
- Adab Raheen Punjab de Tareekh (Punjabi)
- Resistance Themes in Punjabi Literature (English)
- Making of a Nation (English)
- Shah Hussain, a biography of 16th-century Sufi poet (in Urdu language)
- Lahu suhag, a Punjabi translation of Blood Wedding by Garcia Lorca
- Booha Koeena, a Punjabi translation of No Exit by Jean-Paul Sartre
- Akhia Sachal Sarmast nay, a translation of the Seraiki prose of Sachal Sarmast

== Awards and recognition ==
- Pride of Performance Award by the President of Pakistan in 2006
