= Azam Tariq (religious leader) =

Pakistani politician

Mawlānā Azam Tariq
- اعظم طارق

4th Chief of Sipah-e-Sahaba
- In office 1997–2003
- Preceded by: Ziya ur-Rahman Faruqi
- Succeeded by: Ali Sher Hyderi

Member of the National Assembly of Pakistan
- In office 18 November 2002 – 6 October 2003
- Constituency: NA-115 (Jhang-II)
- In office 16 October 1993 – 5 November 1996
- Constituency: NA-68 (Jhang-III)
- In office 1991 – 18 July 1993
- Constituency: NA-68 (Jhang-III)

Personal details
- Born: Azam Tariq Manj; 10 July 1962 Chichawatni, West Pakistan, Pakistan
- Died: 6 October 2003 (aged 41) Islamabad, Pakistan
- Cause of death: Assassination by gunshots
- Party: Sipah-e-Sahaba Pakistan
- Children: Muawiya Azam
- Education: Jamia Uloom-ul-Islamia
- Occupation: Politician, cleric

Azam Tariq Manj (Note: Urdu: اعظم طارق منج) (10 July 1962 – 6 October 2003) was a Pakistani Islamic cleric and politician who served as the fourth supreme of the Sipah-e-Sahaba from 1997 until his assassination in 2003. He also served as member of National Assembly of Pakistan from 1991 to 1996 and from 2002 to 2003.

Tariq became the head of Sipah-e-Sahaba upon the death of Ziya ur-Rahman Faruqi in a February 1997 attack. He was a co-founder of the Difa-e-Pakistan Council.

On 6 October 2003, Tariq was assassinated by unknown assailants as he left the M-2 Motorway to enter the Islamabad.

== Early life and education ==
Azam Tariq Manj was born on 10 July 1962 in Chichawatni, West Pakistan into a Punjabi Rajput family belonging to the Manj tribe. His father was also a religious cleric named Muhammad Fatih Manj. The family's roots lying in the Kalyan village of the Patiala district, now in Indian Punjab, from where they moved due to the partition of India in 1947.

He studied at a local madrassa and then enrolled in the Jamia Uloom-ul-Islamia in Banuri Town, Karachi. Like most madrassa students and graduates at that time, he participated in the Soviet-Afghan jihad, and when he returned, while he was the imam of the Masjid-e-Siddiq-e-Akbar in North Karachi he formed the basis of the future SSP.

== First arrest and assassination attempt ==
Tariq was arrested and jailed on 20 November 1995 alongside Zia-ur-Rehman Farooqi by the Government of Pakistan for anti-Shia activities and in February 1997 during the appearance of both of them due to poor security measures an explosion took place in Lahore sessions court in which the Tariq was seriously injured meanwhile Farooqi was killed in this explosion, Sipah-e-Sahaba accused Sipah-e-Muhammad for the explosion and blamed it for assassination of Farooqi.

Following the killing of Farooqi the organization appointed Tariq as the new chief.

== Second Arrest ==
In August 2001, Tariq was again arrested and jailed on the charges of terrorism and was released in November 2002.

== Political career ==
Tariq was elected three times to the National Assembly of Pakistan in Jhang, even though his constituency was a predominantly Shi'a region.

He contested again in the 2002 elections while in custody and was again elected. He was released in November 2002.

== Views ==
Azam Tariq was accused of disseminating religious animosity, Tariq was also listed on Pakistan's terrorism watch for his involvement in the Sectarian violence in Pakistan against Shia Muslim community and non-Deobandi Sunnis like Sufi Barelvi sect of Sunni Islam. He once said "If Islam is to be established in Pakistan then Shi'a must be declared infidels,".

His aim was to transform Pakistan into a Sunni Deobandi Islamic state governed by strict Sharia Law through an political struggle where Shias and non-Deobandi Sunnis must be declared as the heretical and infidels or just considered to be hypocrites or munafaqeen like Ahemadis.

== Assassination ==
Tariq was shot and assassinated in an attack on 6 October 2003 alongside Islamabad by Sipah-e-Muhammad militants. as he was driving along the Srinagar Highway. his funeral was led by Abdul Rashid Ghazi inside Lal Masjid.

The assassination was part of a growing wave of violent incidents in Pakistan between the sectarian Sunni Deobandi Muslims and the Shias. Violence peaked in July 2003 with the Quetta mosque attack and the massacre of more than 50 people.

On 11 May 2017, 13 years after Tariq's assassination, the Federal Investigation Agency (FIA) arrested a suspect in his murder.

== Personal life ==
Azam Tariq had a son named Muawiya Azam, who is one of the main political leaders of the Sipah-e-Sahaba today.

== Bibliography ==
=== Books by Tariq ===
- Rūdād-i ʻIshq O Vafā, Jhang : Markazī Daftar-i Sipāh-i Ṣaḥābah, 1999-2004, around 1000 pages (in 2 volumes). Author's memoirs.
- Ahammīyat-i Hadīs̲ Dar Dīn, Kābul : Mayvand; Peshawar : Kitābkhānah-ʼi Sabā, 2005, 298 p. Importance of Hadith for Islam, in Persian.
- K̲h̲ut̤bāt-i Jarnail, al-Maʻrūf, K̲h̲ut̤bāt-i Jel, Jhang : Markazī Daftar-i Sipāh-i Ṣaḥābah, 2001. Collection of speeches written in jail (1998-1999) collected by Abū Usāmah Z̤iyāurraḥmān Nāṣir.

=== Books about Tariq ===
- Muḥammad Nadīm Qāsimī, Ḥayāt-i Aʻẓam T̤āriq, Faiṣalābād : Ishāʻatulmaʻārif, 1998, 413 p.
- Muḥammad Nadīm Muʻāviyah, Pārlīmanṭ Kā Londa : S̲ānī-i Jarnail-i Sipāh-yi Ṣaḥābah ... Ḥaz̤rat Maulānā Muḥammad Aʻẓam T̤āriq Shahīd Ke Mufaṣṣal Hālāt-i Zindagī Aur Pārlīmant Kī Taqārīr, Karāchī : Maktabah-yi K̲h̲ilāfat-i Rāshidah, 2005, 376 p.

== See more ==
- List of Deobandis
