= Haq Nawaz Jhangvi =

Pakistani Islamic scholar (1952–1990)

Chief Sipah-e-Sahaba Pakistan
- In office 6 September 1986 – 22 February 1990
- Preceded by: None (office created)
- Succeeded by: Isar ul-Haq Qasmi

Personal life
- Born: 1952 Chela, Jhang District, Punjab, Pakistan
- Died: 22 February 1990 (aged 37–38)
- Cause of death: Assassination by Gunshots
- Children: Masroor Nawaz Jhangvi
- Political party: Sipah-e-Sahaba

Religious life
- Religion: Islam
- Denomination: Sunni
- School: Hanafi
- Movement: Deobandi

Haq Nawaz Jhangvi (Punjabi/Urdu: حق نواز جھنگوی, romanized: Ḥaq Nawāz Jhangvī; 1952 – 23 February 1990) was a Pakistani and a Deobandi Islamic scholar who founded the Sipah-e-Sahaba Pakistan, a Sunni Deobandi alleged terrorist group known for its anti-Shia thoughts, on 6 September 1986.

Jhangvi was assassinated on 22 February 1990 by suspected Shia militants.

== Early life and education ==
Haq Nawaz Jhangvi was born in 1952 in Chela, a village in the Jhang District of West Punjab, into a small land-holding Punjabi family of the Jat-Sipra clan to Wali Muhammad, having memorized the Qur'an by heart in two years before studying Qur'anic recitation and Arabic grammar and then pursuing higher Islamic studies at the Darul Ulum Kabirwala, where he spent five years, and Jamia Khairul Madaris Multan, where he spent seven years, mainly focusing on hadith, becoming an Imam (prayer leader) at a Toba Tek Singh mosque and later a khatib at a Jhang mosque, in 1973.

== Career ==
Jhangvi joined the Jamiat Ulama-e-Islam during the 1970s, and before he began focusing his preaching against Shias, he was active in the Khatm-i Nabuwwat movement against Ahmadis.

After the 1979 Iranian Revolution, Jhangvi began attacking Iran by accusing it of exporting its revolution. He directed his attacks against Shia beliefs and civilians, as well as against Ayatollah Khomeini, Iran's Supreme Leader. Locally, he targeted the Shah Jewna family and the district administration and became extremely popular among local residents.

Jhangvi also began preaching and became popular among Sunni Muslims, who were willing to support him in his cause. He became vocal against local Shias. Jhangvi founded Anjuman-i Sipah-i Sahabah in Jhang on 6 September 1985.

== Assassination and legacy ==
On 23 February 1990, Jhangvi was assassinated by suspected Shia militants.

SSP members Riaz Basra and Akram Lahori formed their own organization in 1996, Lashkar-e-Jhangvi, named after Jhangvi, a group known as one of the most lethal sectarian groups in Pakistan.

Masood Azhar, a radical Islamic scholar and one of the most wanted men by India for his activities, has been described as "an old devotee of Maulana Haq Nawaz Jhangvi."

His son Masroor Nawaz Jhangvi is also a politician and want to continue his father's legacy, but describes himself as less sectarian when it comes to the Shias.

== Bibliography ==
=== Books by him ===
- K̲h̲ut̤bāt-i amīr-i ʻazīmat : bānī-i Sipāh-i Ṣaḥābah Maulānā Ḥaq Navāz Jhangvī kī maʻrikatulārāʼ taqārīr kā majmūʻah. Collections of speeches in many volumes collected by S̲anāʼullāh Sʻad Shujāʻābādī.

=== Books about him ===
- Maz̲hab ahl al-Sunnat va-al-Jamāʻat aur Maulānā Ḥaq Navāz Jhangvī kī shahādat by Qāẓī Maz̤har Ḥusain, 32 p. On his death.
- Amīr-i ʻAzīmat : ḥayāt by Muḥammad Ilyās Bālākoṭī, 319 p. Biography.

== See also ==
- List of Deobandis
