= Religion in politics =

Religion in politics covers various topics related to the effects of religion on politics. Religion has been claimed to be "the source of some of the most remarkable political mobilizations of our times". Beyond universalist ideologies, religions have also been involved in nationalist politics. Various political doctrines have been directly influenced or inspired by religions. Some religious strands support religious supremacism.

== Religious political doctrines by religion ==
=== Islam ===
Various strands of political Islam exist, with most of them falling under the umbrella term of Islamism. Graham Fuller has argued for a broader notion of Islamism as a form of identity politics, involving "support for [Muslim] identity, authenticity, broader regionalism, revivalism, [and] revitalization of the community." This frequently may take a socially conservative or reactionary form, as in wahhabism and salafism. Ideologies which espouse Islamic modernism include Islamic socialism and post-Islamism.

=== Christianity ===
Christian political movements range from Christian socialism, Christian communism, and Christian anarchism on the left, to Christian democracy on the centre, to Christian supremacy and Christian fascism on the Christian right and the Christian Identity movement.

=== Judaism ===
Religious Zionism seeks to create a religious Jewish state.

=== Sikh ===
The Khalistan movement aims to create a homeland for Sikhs.

=== Hindu ===
Hindu nationalism exists in the Hindutva movement.

== Extremism ==
Extremist forms of religious politics include religious terrorism, examples include:

- Islamic extremism and Islamic terrorism has been evident in the actions of the Islamic State, Boko Haram, the Taliban and Al-Qaeda, all of these organizations practice jihadism.
- Christian terrorism has been connected to anti-abortion violence and white supremacy.
- Jewish religious terrorism, such as the Cave of the Patriarchs massacre.
- Saffron terror describes terrorism connected to Hinduism.
- Sikh terrorism includes bombing of Air India Flight 182.

== Religious political issues ==
Religious political issues may involve, but are not limited to, those concerning freedom of religion, applications of religious law, and the right to religious education.

== Religion and the state ==
States have adopted various attitudes towards religion, ranging from theocracy to state atheism.

A theocracy is "government by divine guidance or by officials who are regarded as divinely guided". Modern day recognised theocracies include the Islamic Republic of Iran and the Holy See, while the Taliban and the Islamic State are insurgencies attempting to create such polities. Historical examples include the Islamic Caliphates and the Papal States.

Map of states with official religions.

A more modest form of religious state activity is having an official state religion. Unlike a theocracy, this maintains the superiority of the state over the religious authorities. Over 20% (a total of 43) of the countries in the world have a state religion, most of them (27) being Muslim countries. There are also 13 officially Buddhist countries such as Bhutan, while state churches are present in 27 countries.

In contrast to religious states, secular states recognise no religion. This is often called the principle of the separation of church and state. A more strictly prescribed version, Laïcité, is practiced in France, which prohibits all religious expressions in many public contexts.

Some states are explicitly atheistic, usually those which were produced by revolution, such as various socialist states or the French First Republic.

There have also been cases of states creating their own religions, such as imperial cults or the Cult of Reason.

== Religion and political behaviour ==
=== Frameworks on religion and political identity ===
Understanding religion’s impact on political behaviour is essential because of its complex relationship to the individual: for a political subject, faith is at once an ideology and an identity. As a result, political scientists are divided on whether to consider it alongside other ethnic cleavages such as race, language, caste, and tribe, or whether to recognise it as a separate, special kind of political influence.

Daniel N. Posner holds the former perspective: that religion should be conflated with identity. He underlines that identity is important in politics not because of some “passions [or] traditions it embodies”, but because it reflects “the expected behaviour of other political factors”. In such a framework, religion is treated as a fungible label that can be ‘activated’ and constitute a criterion for membership in an ethnic group.

The latter perspective has been argued by relatively recent scholars, advocating for “(More) Serious” attention to religion in Comparative Politics. Grzymala-Busse outlines three often overlooked characteristics of religion which differentiate it from other markers of identity:

1. Its power to transcend national boundaries. Religion is arguably the largest unit to which individuals claim loyalty (Islam claims roughly 1.5 billion adherents, Christianity roughly 2 billion – respectively 22% and 33% of the world’s population).
2. Its demanding commitment by followers to a specific lifestyle, affecting dress codes, diets, political views – religion proposes an alternative lifestyle defined by “supernatural” forces.
3. Its strength of resistance to secular onslaught because of abnormally “high stakes” like eternal salvation or damnation, making religion much less “pliable” than other ethnic identities.

Considering these characteristics, it becomes possible to consider religion as a unique identity variable with immense power. Several analyses even regard religion as a variable so potent that it is able to reinforce other identities, and as a result allows religious components in secular spheres of society (see: Iversen and Rosenbluth, 2006; Trejo, 2009; Grossman, 2015).

=== Impact on voter turnout in the United States ===
A large portion of existing research demonstrates that religion not only operates as an identity but also as a mechanism that shapes political participation and behavior. Research on voter turnout in the United States points to factors such as socioeconomic status, civic duty, and social networks that affect one's likelihood to vote in a given election; many of these factors can be found in or amplified by religious institutions. These religious institutions often provide dense networks that help facilitate political mobilization, which helps explain why individuals who attend religious services frequently are more likely to vote in a given U.S. election.

Additionally, research shows that religious leaders can play a role in influencing political engagement. For example, statements from Catholic bishops during the 2004 U.S. presidential election were shown to measurably affect the voters. Similarly, research on specific religious communities, such as the Mennonite church, demonstrates how internal practices and norms can shape patterns of political participation.

== Debates about religion in politics ==
There have been arguments for and against a role for religion in politics. Yasmin Alibhai-Brown has argued that "faith and state should be kept separate" as "the most sinister and oppressive states in the world are those that use God to control the minds and actions of their populations", such as Iran and Saudi Arabia. To this, Dawn Foster has responded that when religion is fully unmoored from politics it becomes all the more insular and more open to abuse.

== See also ==
- List of political ideologies § Religious ideologies
- Democracy: The God That Failed
- Secularism
- Separation of church and state
