= Sipah-e-Sahaba Pakistan =

Sunni Islamist political party in Pakistan

Sipah-e-Sahaba
- سپاہِ صحابہ
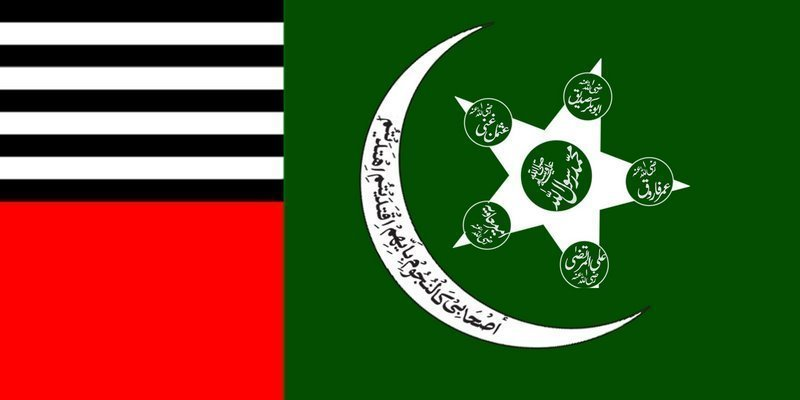
- Original flag in use from 1985 to 2003 Current flag in use since 2005
- Other name: Millat-e-Islamiyya (MI) and Ahle Sunnat Wal Jama'at (ASWJ)
- Founders: Haq Nawaz Jhangvi X Isar ul Haq Qasmi X Zia ur Rehman Farooqi X Azam Tariq X
- Political leader: Muawiya Azam
- Sarparast: Ahmed Ludhianvi; Ali Sher Hyderi X
- Split from: Jamiat Ulema-e-Islam
- Split to: Lashkar-e-Jhangvi
- Active regions: Pakistan
- Ideology: Sunni Islamism; Deobandism; Political Islam
- Status: Active (Banned in Pakistan from 2002 until 2018)
- Size: 3,000 (2026)

The Sipah-e-Sahaba (SeS or SSP), (Note: Urdu: سپاہِ صحابہ, lit. 'Army of the Prophet's Companions') (Note: briefly known as the Millat-e-Islamiyya (MeI) from 2002 to 2005) now known as the Ahle Sunnat Wal Jama'at (ASWJ), (Note: Urdu: اہل سنت والجماعت, lit. 'The People of the Sunnah') is a Sunni Deobandi Islamist socio-political organization in Pakistan. Founded by Pakistani Islamic scholar Haq Nawaz Jhangvi in 1985 after breaking away from Sunni Deobandi party Jamiat Ulema-e-Islam, it is based in Jhang, Punjab, but has offices in all of Pakistan's provinces and territories.

The group was founded as an Islamist militia. It later transitioned into a political party before being banned and designated as a terrorist organization by Pakistani President Pervez Musharraf in 2002. After being unbanned and rebranded as Ahle Sunnat Wal Jamaat, the group was again banned in 2012.

Before 2018 Pakistani general election, the Pakistani government lifted a ban on the organization and removed the terrorist designation for affiliated officials. It has significant support in Punjab and Khyber Pakhtunkhwa, as well as in Southern/coastal Sindh in Karachi. The organization was also banned by the United Kingdom, where there is a significant Pakistani diaspora population, in 2001. The group has held seats in the Government in Punjab and Pakistan National Assembly.

The organization's current political front is the Pakistan Rah-e-Haq Party, under which they contested in the 2018 general election, 2020 Gilgit–Baltistan Assembly election and the 2024 general election.

== History ==
Sipah-e-Sahaba Pakistan was formed in 1985 by Haq Nawaz Jhangvi, Ziya ur-Rahman Faruqi, Isar ul-Haq Qasmi and Azam Tariq in 1985 originally as Anjuman Sipah-e-Sahaba in Jhang, Pakistan.

The original purpose was to fight Shi'ite landlords dominance in Jhang and surrounding areas in a majority Sunni population. Later, they became violent and started to attack Shi'ite Muslims. From 1980s, they are involved in various militant activities, during which they had killed hundreds of Shias throughout Pakistan. In 2011, the group issued a statement declaring all Shias to be "wajib-ul-qatal" ("deserving to be killed"). They are operating all over Pakistan and are politically active having large vote bank in Punjab and Khyber Pakhtunkhwa (KP). They are widely organized and have more than five hundred offices throughout country. A leader of the organization was a minister in the coalition Government in Punjab in 1993 and the group has held seats in the Pakistan National Assembly.

The organization's leadership has been subject to a series of assassinations. Founder Haq Nawaz Jhangvi was killed by Shi'a militants in 1990; his successor, Isar ul-Haq Qasmi, was assassinated a year later in 1991. The next leader, Ziya ur-Rahman Faruqi, was killed in a bomb explosion at the Lahore Session Court on 19 January 1997, after which leadership passed to Azam Tariq.

Rah-e-Haq party flag

The group's decision to cease militant activities and pursue a political path in 1996 under Ziya ur-Rahman and Azam Tariq led to internal dissent. A significant faction of hardline members, opposing this shift, splintered from the group to establish the more radical Lashkar-e-Jhangvi. ASWJ later distanced itself from Lashkar-e-Jhangvi.

In 2002, Pervez Musharraf government declared the group as terrorist organization and banned it. However, later, they renamed it and relaunched it under the name of Millat-e-Islamiyya Pakistan. They were again banned in 2003.

Azam Tariq was also assassinated along with four others on 6 October 2003 in an attack widely attributed to the Shi'a militant organization Sipah-e-Muhammad. After his assassination, Ali Sher Hyderi was selected as the president and Khalifa Abdul Qayyum was appointed as sarparast-e-aala (Patron). they also changed their name to Ahle Sunnat wal Jamaat. In 2013, the group was again banned. At least as of 2014 it was still using ASWJ.

Variant of the flag used between 2002 and 2005, when the party was banned and operated under the name Millat-e-Islamiyya.

Ali Sher Haideri, led the group until he was assassinated in an ambush in 2009 on the outskirts of Khairpur, Sindh. Then Muhammad Ahmed Ludhianvi was selected as sarparast-e-aala with Awrangzib Faruqi as the president and chief of the organization. Faruqi took part in the 2024 Pakistani general election on NA-230.

The group operates throughout Pakistan and maintains political activity across several regions. It holds a particularly strong political base in Jhang, led by its primary political leader, Muawiya Azam, and in Karachi, where its regional leadership was initially held by Abdul Ghafoor Nadeem and Salim Khatri before being passed to Aurangzaib Farooqi. The organization also commands a significant vote bank in the provinces of Sindh and Khyber Pakhtunkhwa. They are widely organized and have more than five hundred offices throughout country. The founder's son, Masroor Nawaz Jhangvi, was also a member of the Punjab Assembly, serving from January 2017 until May 2018. In October 2020, SSP regional leader in Karachi Aurangzeb Farooqi gave a deadline to the Sindh government to arrest Maulana Adil Khan's killers.

== Etymology ==
The organization was founded as Sipah-e-Sahaba (SSP). (Note: also known as Anjuman Sipah-e-Sahaba (ASSP)) It has undergone several name changes, particularly in response to legal bans. Following a state ban in 2002, it operated as Millat-e-Islamia Pakistan until 2005, after which it reorganized under its current name, Ahle Sunnat wal Jamaat (ASWJ).

== Ideology and goals ==
The SSP is driven by a rigid interpretation of Deobandi Islam that considers Shias and non-Deobandi Sunnis heretical. "If Islam is to be established in Pakistan," SSP leader Azam Tariq once said, "then Shias must be declared infidels".

== Leadership ==
- Haq Nawaz Jhangvi (September 1985 to February 22, 1990): Assassinated
- Isar-ul-Haq Qasmi (February 1990 to January 1991): Assassinated
- Ziya ur-Rahman Faruqi (1991 to January 18, 1997): Assassinated
- Azam Tariq (January 1997 to October 6, 2003): Assassinated
- Ali Sher Hyderi (October 2003 to August 17, 2009): Assassinated
- Muhammad Ahmad Ludhianvi (August 2009 to present)

== Activities ==
=== Organizational infrastructure ===
According to a 2004 report, the organization had 500 offices and branches in all provinces of Pakistan including Kashmir and Gilgit-Baltistan. It also had approximately 300,000 registered workers in Pakistan and 17 branches in countries including the United Arab Emirates, Saudi Arabia, Bangladesh, Canada and the United Kingdom.

According to Jamestown Foundation reporting in 2005, the organization has a support base of tens of thousands and was estimated to include up to 6,000 "trained and professional cadres", some of whom have been implicated in sectarian violence. It is also reported to maintain around 17 branches in countries such as Saudi Arabia, Bangladesh, Canada, and the United Kingdom, describing the SSP as "the largest and most pervasive Sunni supremacist organization in the world."

=== Target killings and militancy ===
According to Stanford University's "Mapping Militant Organizations" as of February 2012, the "primary methods" of Sipah-e-Sahaba

are targeted killings of prominent Shias – including political activists, doctors, businessmen and intellectuals. In addition to targeting Shias, the SSP has also been implicated in attacks on members of the Ahmadi sect and followers of the Barelvi school of Sunni Islam. The SSP's actions have spurred a cycle of violence and assassinations and several of its leaders have been killed – including Haq Nawaz Jhangvi in 1990, Isar ul-Qasmi in 1991, Zia ul-Rehman Farooqi in 1997, and Azam Tariq in 2003.

Sipah-e-Sahaba was commonly connected to attacks including massacres, targeted killings, and inspiring lone wolf terrorist attacks against Shias, Ahmadis, and even rival Barelvi Sunnis.

Sipah-e-Sahaba was alleged to have involved in the 1998 killing of Iranian diplomats in Afghanistan.

Sipah-e-Sahaba was involved in many conflicts on the side of Sunni Islamists including the Soviet–Afghan War, Afghan Civil War (1989–1992), Afghan Civil War (1996–2001), War in Afghanistan (2001–2021), Taliban insurgency, Khyber Pakhtunkhwa Insurgency, Balochistan Insurgency, Kashmir insurgency, MQM militancy, and the Sectarian violence in Pakistan. It was known, (in these conflicts), for gathering Pakistani volunteers, particularly from Pakistan's Eastern provinces, and also for its anti-Shia rhetoric and activities.

=== Publications ===
Its regular publications include the monthlies Khilafat-e-Rashida, Aab-e-Hayat and Genius.

== Affiliations ==
- In 1996 elements within the Sipah-e-Sahaba, who did not believe the organization was violent enough, left to form the Lashkar-e-Jhangvi.
- In October 2000, Masood Azhar, founder of the banned Jaish-e-Mohammed, was quoted as saying that "Sipah-e-Sahaba stands shoulder to shoulder with Jaish-e-Muhammad in Jihad." A leaked U.S. diplomatic cable described Jaish-e-Mohammed as "another Sipah-e-Sahaba breakaway Deobandi organization."
- A diplomatic cable, originally dated 23 October 2009 and later leaked to the media, from the U.S. embassy in Islamabad indicated that Qari Hussain, a leading militant of the Tehrik-i-Taliban Pakistan, had roots in the defunct Sipah-e-Sahaba and that many of the Taliban's foot soldiers are from Sipah-e-Sahaba ranks.
- According to Animesh Roul, Ahle-Sunnat-Wal-Jamat (ASWJ) is a front group for Sipah-e-Sahab and was also banned in Pakistan for this until 2018.
