= Jhang =

City in Punjab, Pakistan

Jhang جھنگ Jhang Sadar
- City
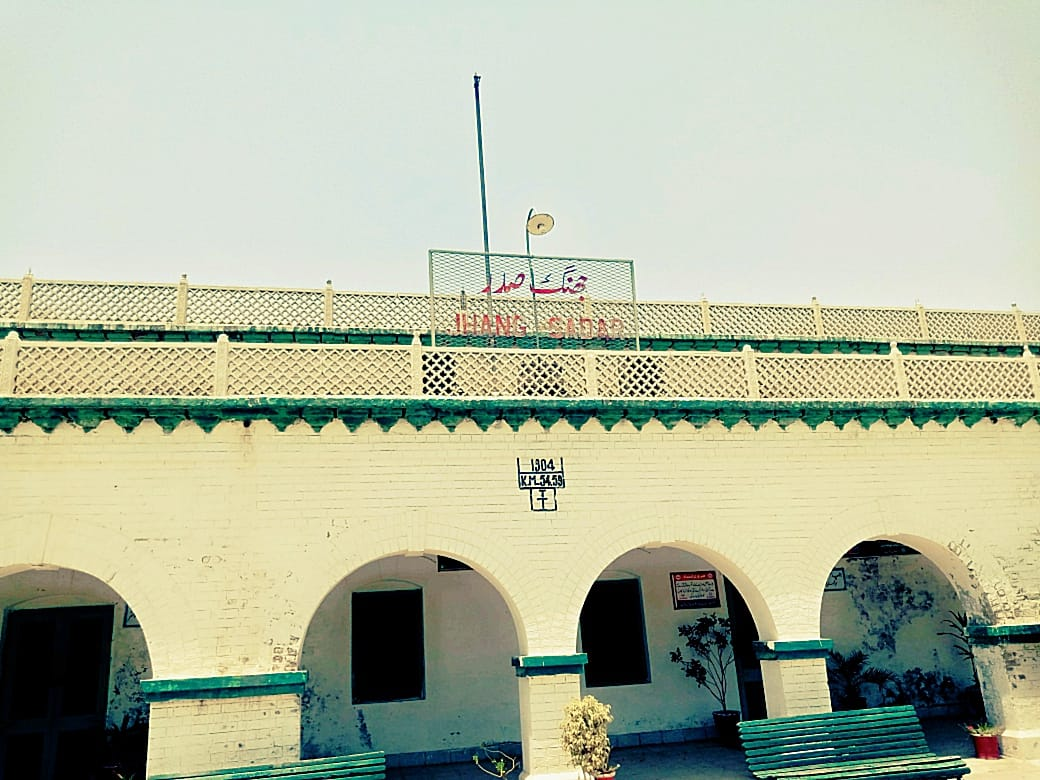
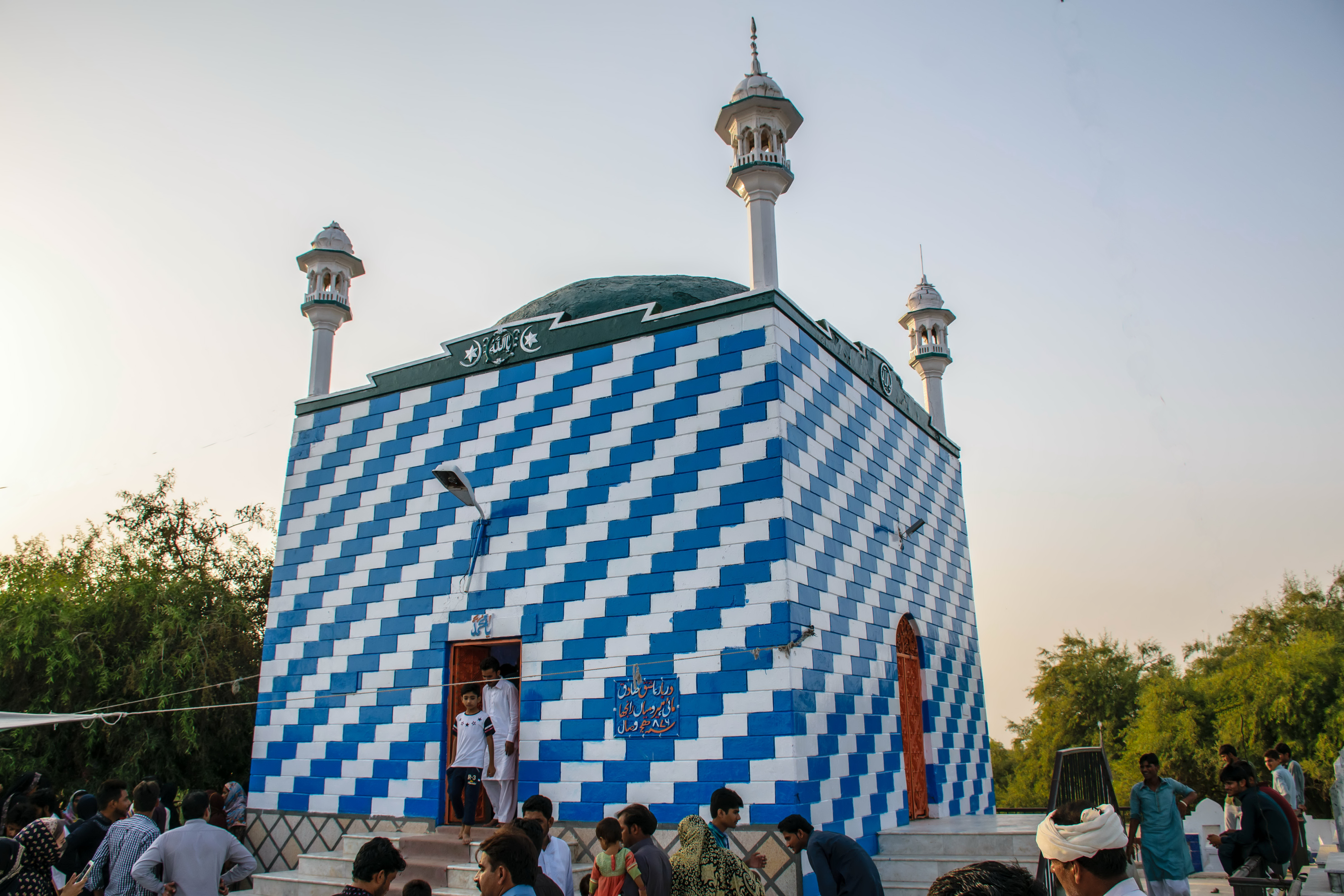
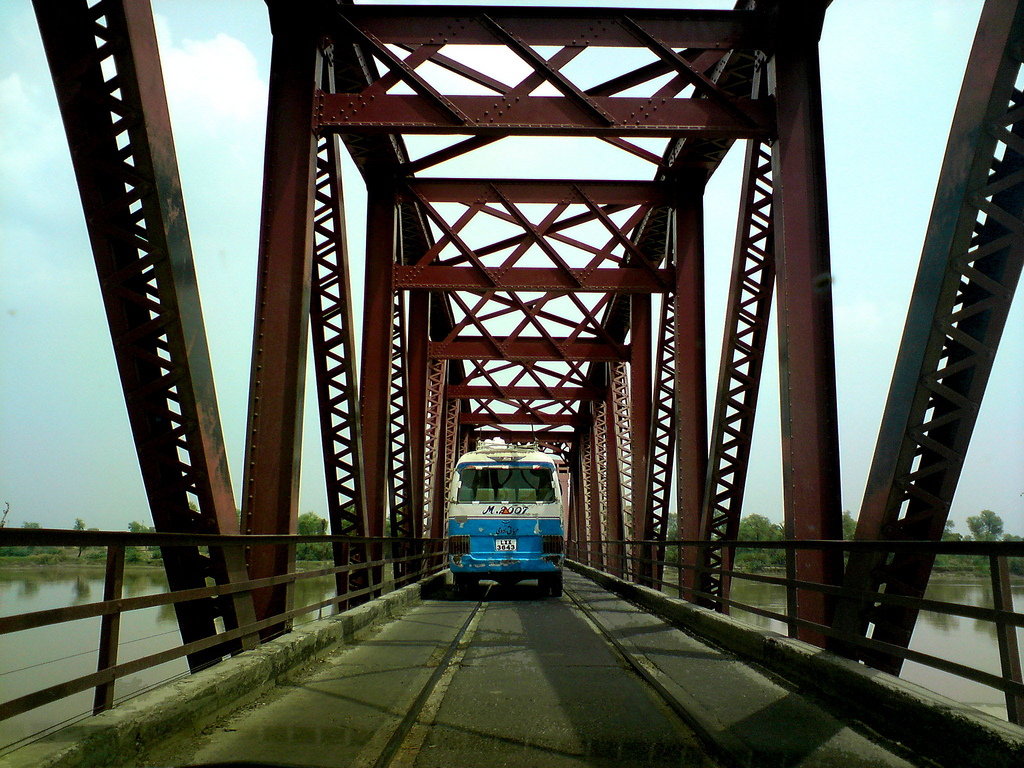
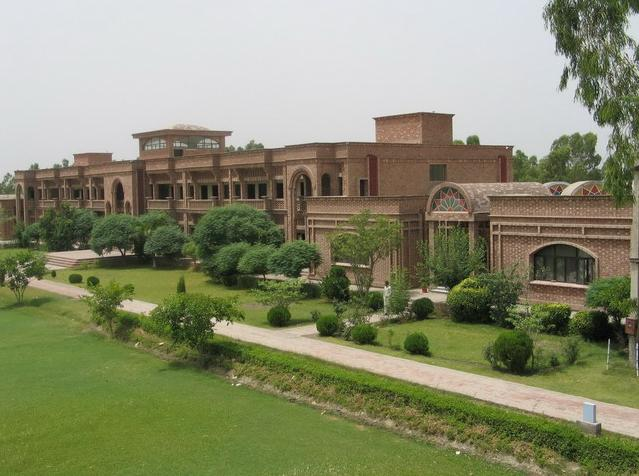
- Clockwise from top: Jhang Saddar Railway Station; Shrine of Heer and Ranjha; Chenab College; Trimmu Barrage and Rivaz Bridge

- Location within Punjab, Pakistan Location within Pakistan
- Coordinates: 31°16′10″N 72°18′58″E
- Country: Pakistan
- Province: Punjab
- Division: Faisalabad
- District: Jhang

Area
  - Total: 28.27 km^{2} (10.92 sq mi)

Population (2023)
  - Total: 606,533
  - Rank: 14th in Pakistan
  - Density: 21,460/km^{2} (55,570/sq mi)
- Time zone: UTC+5 (PST)
- Postal code: 35200
- Calling code: 047
- Website: jhang.punjab.gov.pk

Jhang (Punjabi / Urdu: جھنگ; Punjabi pronunciation: [ˈt͡ʃə̀ŋ.gᵊ]; Urdu pronunciation: [d͡ʒʱəŋɡ]) is the headquarters of the Jhang District in central Punjab, Pakistan. Situated on the east bank of the Chenab River, it is the 14th most populous city in Pakistan.

== Etymology ==
The historical name of the city and district is Jhang Sial, literally meaning the "terrain of the Sials". The word Jhang is derived from the Sanskrit word jāṅgala which means rough or forested terrain; the word Jungle shares the same root.

== History ==
The city of Jhang was built in 1288 by Rai Sial, a chief of the Sial tribe. The Sial tribe ruled this region ever since then until the last Sial ruler of Jhang, Ahmad Khan (1812 to 1822) was defeated by Ranjit Singh after fierce fighting.

Under the collective rule of the Sial khans of Jhang and other Sial sub-tribes such as the Rajbana and Bharwana, in the zenith of their power, the Sial territory of Jhang extended up to the Muzaffargarh boundary in the south, and the entirety of Chiniot, Kamalia and Kabirwala ilakas. The territory extended to parts of Bhakkar and Sargodha. The Garh Mahraja and Ahmadpur Sial ilakas were added to the possessions of the Rajbana Sial tribe who drove out the Baloch tribes to the Thal and defeated the Nawab of Multan by the mid 18th-century.

Under the British Raj, the towns of Jhang and Mighiana, lying two miles (3.2 km) apart, became a joint municipality, then known as Jhang-Maghiana.

== Geography ==
Jhang Sadr is located at 31.27 latitude and 72.33 longitude and is situated at an elevation of 158 meters above sea level.

Jhang is situated at the east bank of the Chenab River which has confluence with Jhelum at Trimmu Barrage near the town of Athara Hazari. The city was endangered in the 2014 floods but it was not flooded as the flood water was redirected towards Athara Hazari. Maghiana lies on the edge of the highlands, overlooking the alluvial valley of the Chenab, while the older town of Jhang occupies the lowlands at its foot.

== Demographics ==
Population

Historical population

Year	Pop.	±%
1951	73,397	—
1961	94,971	+29.4%
1972	131,843	+38.8%
1981	195,558	+48.3%

Year	Pop.	±%
1998	293,366	+50.0%
2017	414,131	+41.2%
2023	606,533	+46.5%

The population of city in 1998 Census of Pakistan was recorded as 293,366. According to the 2017 Census of Pakistan, the population of city rose to 414,131 with a growth of 41.17% in 19 years.

=== Languages ===
Languages of Jhang City (2023)
1. Punjabi (81.6%)
2. Urdu (17.5%)
3. Others (0.90%)

=== Religion ===
Religious groups in Jhang City (1868−2023) (Note: 1868-1941: Data for the entirety of the town of Jhang, which included Maghiana, Jhang Municipality and Jhang Civil Lines. 2017-2023: Urban population of Jhang Tehsil.)
Religious group	1868		1881		1891		1901		1911		1921		1931		1941		2017		2023	
Religious group	Pop.	%	Pop.	%	Pop.	%	Pop.	%	Pop.	%	Pop.	%	Pop.	%	Pop.	%	Pop.	%	Pop.	%
Hinduism (Note: 1931-1941: Including Ad-Dharmis)	9,760	49.67%	10,187	47.1%	11,355	48.75%	12,189	49.99%	12,395	47.83%	14,389	47.74%	16,724	46.41%	23,286	46.52%	36	0.01%	26	0%
Islam	8,942	45.51%	10,941	50.58%	11,334	48.66%	11,684	47.92%	12,707	49.04%	14,760	48.97%	18,042	50.07%	24,506	48.96%	427,008	99.43%	618,728	99.3%
Sikhism	435	2.21%	495	2.29%	573	2.46%	484	1.99%	796	3.07%	970	3.22%	1,243	3.45%	2,215	4.43%	—N/a	—N/a	5	0%
Christianity	12	0.06%	—N/a	—N/a	28	0.12%	25	0.1%	12	0.05%	13	0.04%	26	0.07%	39	0.08%	1,836	0.43%	3,879	0.62%
Jainism	—N/a	—N/a	0	0%	0	0%	0	0%	4	0.02%	7	0.02%	0	0%	5	0.01%	—N/a	—N/a	—N/a	—N/a
Zoroastrianism	—N/a	—N/a	—N/a	—N/a	0	0%	0	0%	0	0%	0	0%	0	0%	—N/a	—N/a	—N/a	—N/a	0	0%
Judaism	—N/a	—N/a	—N/a	—N/a	0	0%	0	0%	0	0%	0	0%	0	0%	—N/a	—N/a	—N/a	—N/a	—N/a	—N/a
Buddhism	0	0%	—N/a	—N/a	0	0%	0	0%	0	0%	0	0%	0	0%	—N/a	—N/a	—N/a	—N/a	—N/a	—N/a
Ahmadiyya	—N/a	—N/a	—N/a	—N/a	—N/a	—N/a	—N/a	—N/a	—N/a	—N/a	—N/a	—N/a	—N/a	—N/a	—N/a	—N/a	561	0.13%	433	0.07%
Others	500	2.54%	6	0.03%	0	0%	0	0%	0	0%	0	0%	0	0%	0	0%	0	0%	22	0%
Total population	19,649	100%	21,629	100%	23,290	100%	24,382	100%	25,914	100%	30,139	100%	36,035	100%	50,051	100%	429,441	100%	623,093	100%

== Administration ==
Jhang Saddar is the administrative center of Jhang Tehsil (a subdivision of the district). The tehsil itself is divided into 55 union councils.

== Notable people ==
=== Scientists ===
- Abdus Salam, first Pakistani Nobel Laureate (Physics).
- Yash Pal, Indian scientist.
- Har Gobind Khorana, Indian American biochemist

=== Politicians ===
- Khan Arif Khan Rajbana, former federal and provincial minister, honourable Chief Whip of All-India Muslim League and a close associate of the Quaid-e-Azam
- Syeda Abida Hussain, former Pakistani Ambassador to USA and Federal minister.
- Mian Muhammad Azam, former member of the Provincial Assembly of the Punjab.
- Faisal Saleh Hayat, former Interior Minister of Pakistan and FIFA official.
- Nazir Sultan, former Member National Assembly.
- Mahboob Sultan, Federal minister.
- Ghulam Bibi Bharwana, Member National Assembly.
- Najaf Abbas, former member of National Assembly and Provincial Assembly.
- Waqas Akram, former minister of state for Labour and Manpower
- Haq Nawaz Jhangvi, Pakistani cleric, founder of Sipah-e-Sahaba Pakistan and namesake of Lashkar-e-Jhangvi
- Azam Tariq, Pakistani politician, religious leader, member of national assembly, leader of sunni-Deoband Muslim organization 'Sipah-e-Sahaba Pakistan'
- Masroor Nawaz Jhangvi, Pakistani Islamic cleric and politician, Member of Provincial Assembly (MPA) Punjab, son of Haq Nawaz Jhangvi
- Zahoor Ahmed Sajid, former Member of Provincial Assembly.
- Syed Abid Hussain Shah, former minister of Pakistan.

=== Sports personalities ===
- Aleem Dar, cricketer and umpire
- Ghulam Shabber, UAE cricket player

=== Literary personalities ===
- Majeed Amjad, Urdu poet
- Nasir Abbas Nayyar, Pakistani Urdu language columnist
- Ishtiaq Ahmad, Urdu fiction writer

=== Artists ===
- Raghu Rai, photographer and photojournalist

=== Religious figures ===
- Sultan Bahu, founder of the Sarwari Qadiri Sufi order
- Shah Jeewna, founder of Qalandariyya Sufi order
- Muhammad Tahir-ul-Qadri, founder of the Minhaj-ul-Quran International and Pakistan Awami Tehreek
- Zulfiqar Ahmad Naqshbandi, founder of the Mahadul-Faqir Al-Islami, Jhang

=== Business people ===
- Sheikh Waqas Akram, founder of Shalimar Transport

== Sister cities ==
Jhang has one sister city:

- Madera, California
