= List of colleges in Pakistan =

These are the intermediate colleges in Pakistan.

== Public sector ==
These are the intermediate colleges in Pakistan.

== Colleges for boys ==
- Forman Christian College, Lahore
- Army Public Schools & Colleges System
- The Reader Group of Colleges, Sargodha
- Army Burnhall School and College for Boys KPK, Abbottabad
- Government Post Graduate College, Chakwal
- Adamjee Government Science College, Karachi
- Kallar Kahar Science College
- Britain International College, Multan
- Chenab College Ahmedpur Sial Ahmedpur Sial Tehsil
- Nusrat Jahan Girls College, Chenab Nagar
- Chenab College Chiniot Chiniot District
- Chenab College Jhang, Jhang District
- Chenab College Shorkot, Shorkot Tehsil
- City College of Science and Commerce Multan
- Concordia Colleges, Punjab
- D. J. Sindh Government Science College, Karachi
- Defence Authority Degree College for Men, Karachi
- Nusrat Jahan Boys College, Chenab Nagar
- Faran Model College Jhang, Jhang District
- Fazal Haq College for Boys, Mardan
- Ghazali Inter College, Bhawana
- Government College for Men Nazimabad, Karachi
- Government College of Science Wahdat Road, Lahore
- Government College of Science, Multan
- Government College University (GCU), Lahore
- Government Islamia College Civil Lines, Lahore
- Government National College, Karachi
- Islamia College Lahore, Punjab Pakistan
- Government Islamia Science College, Karachi
- Edwardes College Peshawar, Peshawar
- Paf College Risalpur, Nowshera, KPK
- Pak National College of Commerce and Sciences, Rawalpindi
- Pakistan Shipowners' College, Karachi
- Punjab Group of Colleges
- Royal Education & Law College Arifwala
- Dr Ziauddin Intermediate College, Karachi
- Government Post Graduate College Pattoki
- New Horizons Academy for Matric and Intermediate, Madina Syedan Gujrat

== Colleges for girls ==
- Army Public Schools & Colleges System

Punjab Group of Colleges

- The Reader Group of Colleges, Punjab
- Defence College for Girls, KP Mardan Cantt.
- Chenab College Ahmedpur Sial, Ahmedpur Sial Tehsil
- Chenab College Chiniot, Chiniot District
- Concordia Colleges, Punjab
- Chenab College Jhang, Jhang District
- Chenab College Shorkot, Shorkot Tehsil
- Faran Model College Jhang, Jhang District
- Govt. Degree College Phool Nagar, Kasur (Girls)
- Rana Liaquat Ali Khan Government College of Home Economics, Karachi
- Sir Syed Government Girls College
- Ghazali Inter College, Bhawana
- Government College for Girls, Peshawar Road, Rawalpindi
- Royal Education & Law College Arifwala
- Hira Girls College Bhoun Road Chakwal
- Peshawar College for Girls, Peshawar
- Federal College Risalpur, Khyber Pakhtunkhwa
- Gulberg Degree College Lahore, Lahore
- Frontier Degree College Peshawar, Peshawar
- New Horizons Academy for Matric and Intermediate Madina Syedan Gujrat

== Other colleges ==
- Greenfield College Sargodha, Sargodha
- Cadet College Rawalpindi, Chakri Pakistan
- Aga Khan Higher Secondary School, Karachi
- AIMS Science College
- Saint Mary's Law College
- Aligarh Institute of Technology, Karachi
- Bahria College, Karachi
- Multan Institute of Professional Studies
- (SM College), Gujranwala
- National College of Computer Sciences (Gujranwala)
- Professional College of Commerce and Management Sciences (Rajanpur)
- Republic College, Islamabad

Nowshera College of Nursing and Health Sciences, Akora Khattak, KP

== Military colleges ==
- Military College of Engineering, Risalpur
- Army Public College of Management Sciences
- Military College Jhelum, Jhelum District
- Military College Murree, Rawalpindi District
- Military College Sui, Dera Bugti District

== Gallery ==
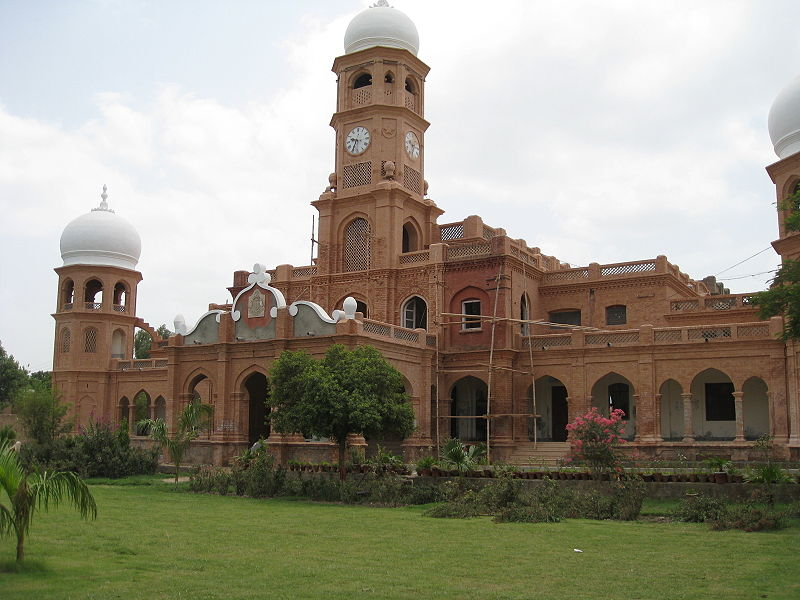
Government Sadiq Egerton College Bahawalpur

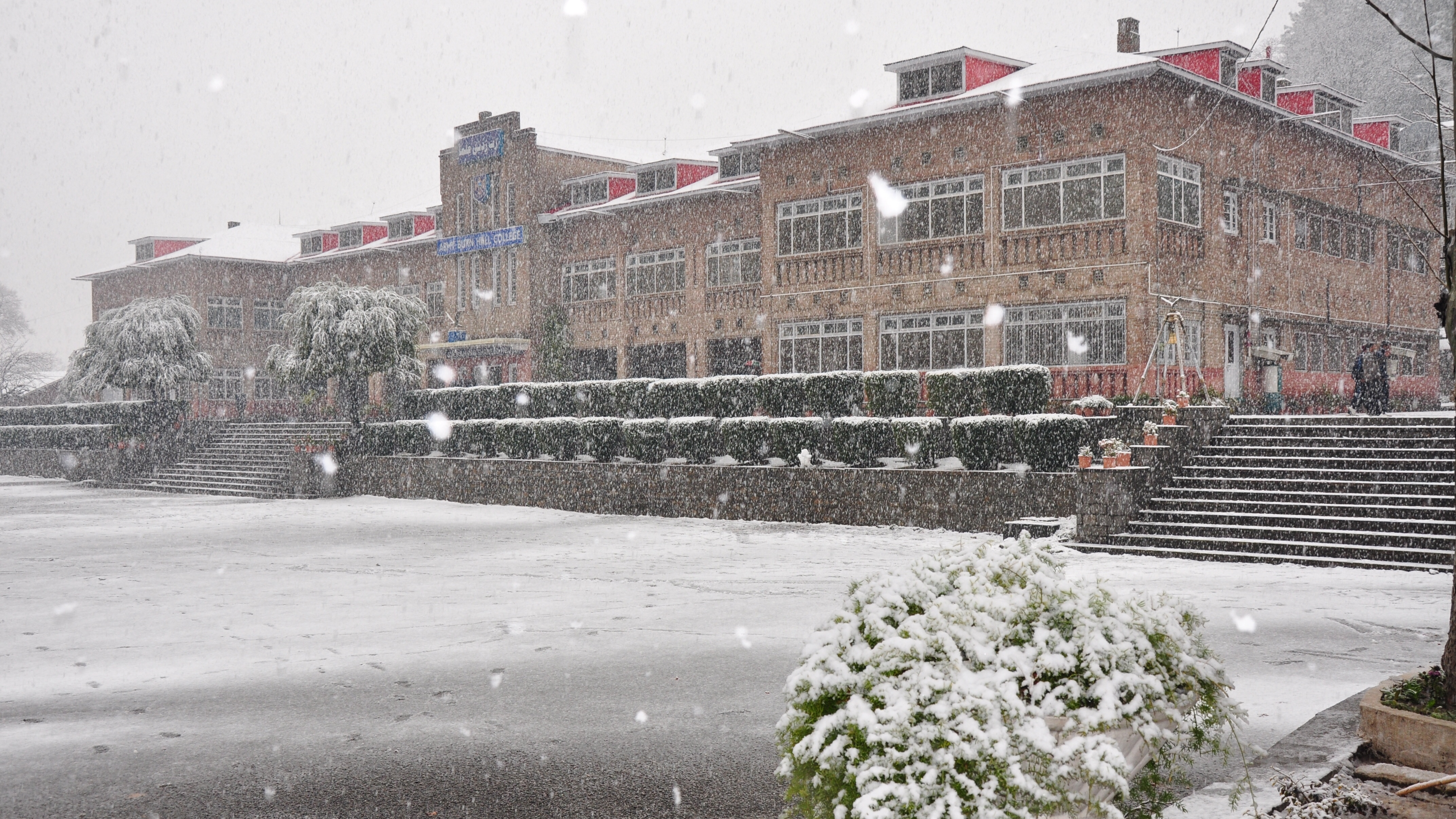
Army Burn Hall College

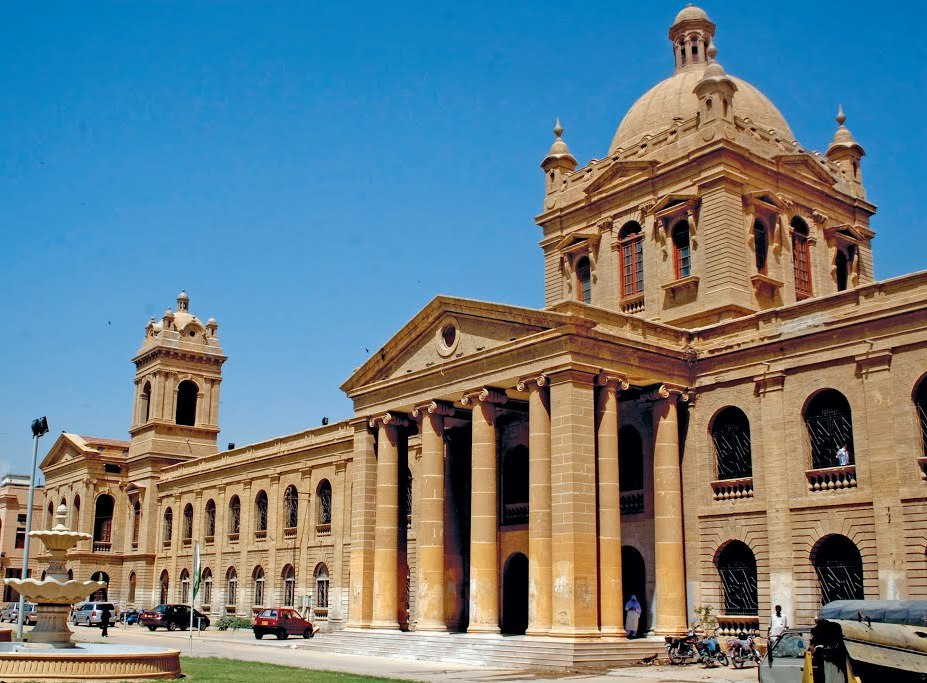
D. J. Sindh Government Science College

King Edward Medical College

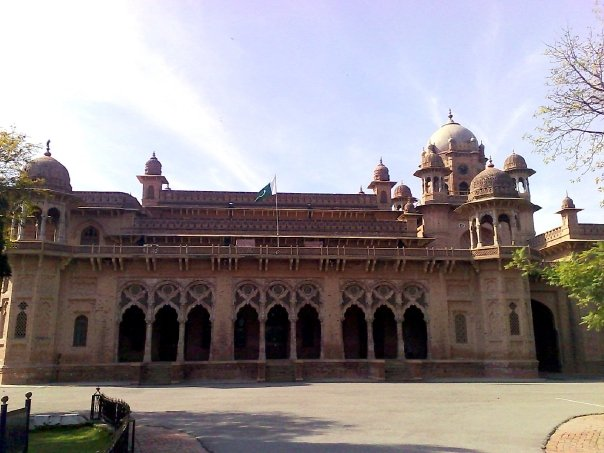
Aitchison College, Lahore

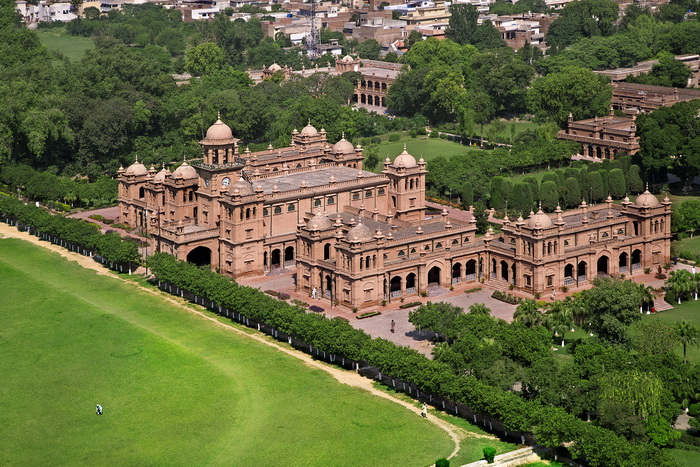
Islamia College

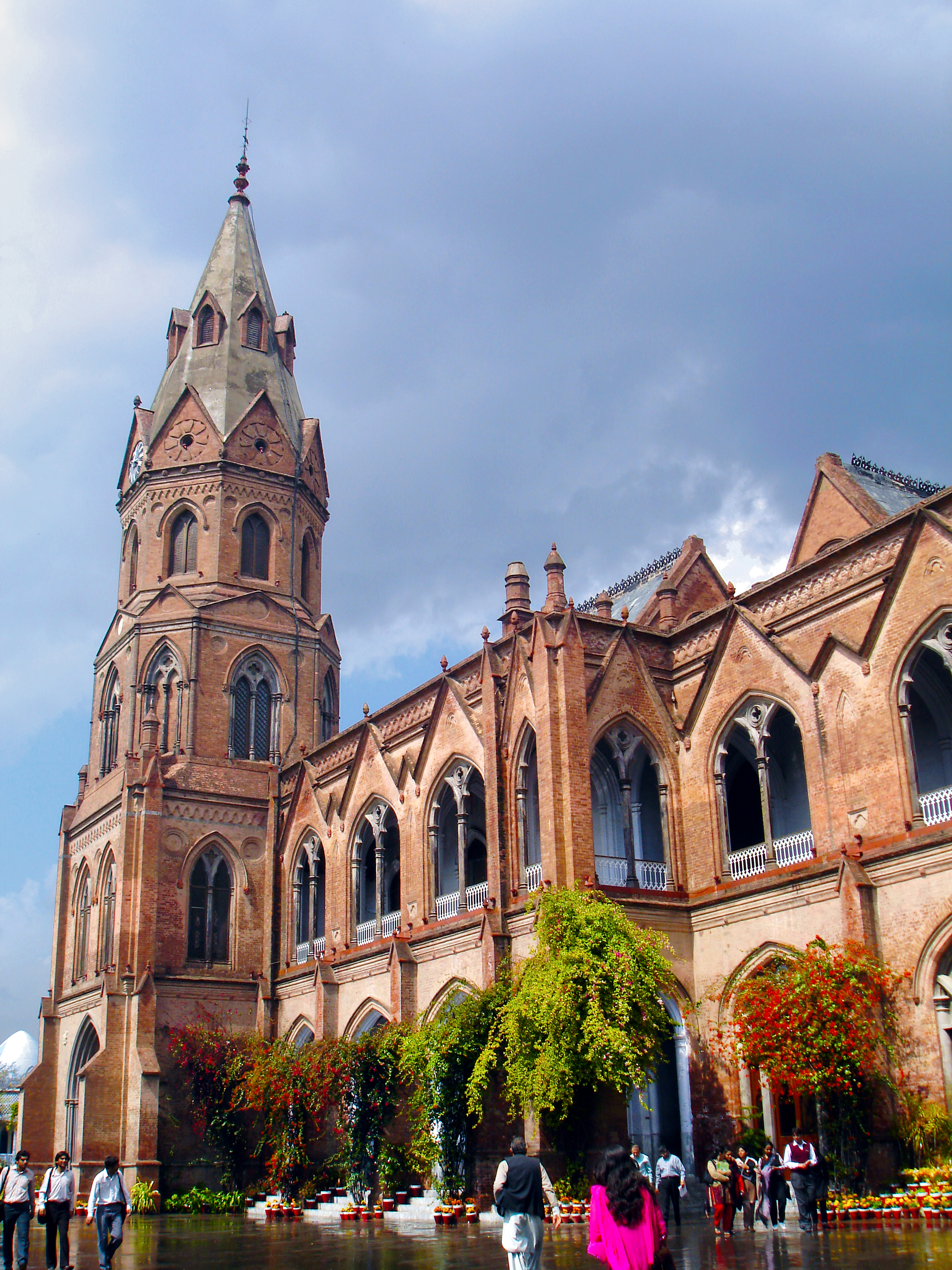
Government College, Lahore

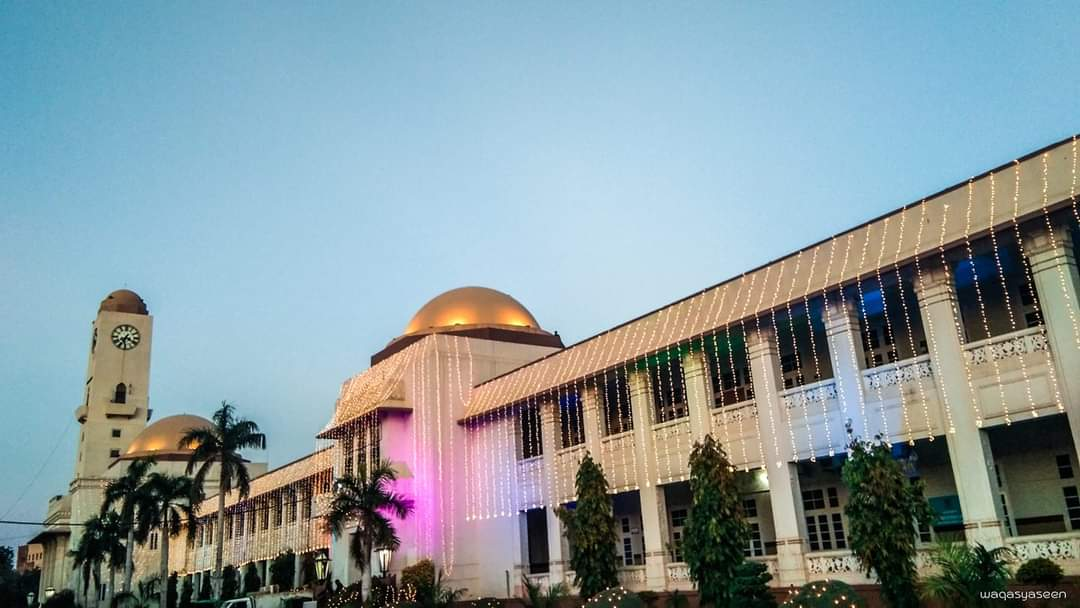
Nishtar Medical College

== See also ==
- List of universities in Pakistan
- Ragging in Pakistani colleges and universities
- Education in Pakistan
- List of law schools in Pakistan
- Government College of Women
- Government Degree Girls College
