= NA-110 Jhang-III =

Constituency of the National Assembly of Pakistan

- Constituency for the National Assembly of Pakistan
- Region: Shorkot Tehsil (partly) and Ahmadpur Sial Tehsil of Jhang District
- Electorate: 578,473

Current constituency
- Party: Pakistan Tehreek-e-Insaf
- Member: Muhammad Ameer Sultan
- Created from: NA-90 Jhang-V NA-87 Jhang-II (2002-2018); NA-116 Jhang-3 (2018-2023)

NA-110 Jhang-III (این اے-110، جھنگ-3) is a constituency for the National Assembly of Pakistan. It comprises Shorkot Tehsil (including Shorkot Cantonment), the city of Ahmedpur Sial, and some areas of Jhang Tehsil (Bagh, Kot Lakhnana, and Magiana).

== Members of Parliament ==
=== 2018–2023: NA-116 Jhang-III ===
Election	Member	Party
2018	Muhammad Ameer Sultan	PTI

=== 2024–present: NA-110 Jhang-III ===
Election	Member	Party
2024	Muhammad Ameer Sultan	PTI

== Election 2002 ==
General elections were held on 10 October 2002. Saima Akhtar Bharwana an independent candidate won by 56,647 votes.

General election 2002: NA-90 Jhang-V
Party	Candidate	Votes	%	±%
Independent	Saima Akhtar Bharwana	56,647	48.69	
NA	Sahibzada Muhammad Nazir Sultan	56,180	48.29	
MMA	Shahbaz Ahmad Gujar	3,517	3.02	
Turnout		119,254	51.63	
Total valid votes		116,344	97.56	
Rejected ballots		2,910	2.44	
Majority		467	0.40	
Registered electors		230,982		

== Election 2008 ==
General elections were held on 18 February 2008. Saima Akhtar Bharwana an independent candidate won by 64,759 votes.

General election 2008: NA-90 Jhang-V
Party	Candidate	Votes	%	±%
Independent	Saima Akhtar Bharwana	64,759	49.49	
PML(Q)	Sahibzada Muhammad Nazir Sultan	58,099	44.40	
Others	Others (three candidates)	7,991	6.11	
Turnout		135,416	49.45	
Total valid votes		130,849	96.63	
Rejected ballots		4,567	3.97	
Majority		6,660	5.09	
Registered electors		273,873		
Independent hold				

== Election 2013 ==
General elections were held on 11 May 2013. Sahibzada Nazir Sultan, an independent candidate, won by 52,105 votes and later joined the PML(N).

General election 2013: NA-90 Jhang-V
Party	Candidate	Votes	%	±%
Independent	Sahibzada Muhammad Nazir Sultan	52,105	34.13	
PML(N)	Saima Akhtar Bharwana	41,620	27.26	
MDM	Muhammad Asif Moavia Sial	37,794	24.76	
Independent	Abid Hussain Janjiana	16,762	10.98	
Others	Others (ten candidates)	4,373	2.87	
Turnout		159,910	66.95	
Total valid votes		152,654	95.46	
Rejected ballots		7,256	4.54	
Majority		10,485	6.87	
Registered electors		238,856		
Independent hold				

== Election 2018 ==
General elections were held on 25 July 2018.

General election 2018: NA-116 Jhang-III
Party	Candidate	Votes	%	±%
PTI	Muhammad Ameer Sultan	90,649	32.10	
Independent	Muhammad Asif Muavia Sial	70,842	25.09	
Independent	Ameer Abbas Sial	54,176	19.19	
Independent	Saima Akhtar Bharwana	48,731	17.26	
Others	Others (nine candidates)	17,969	6.36	
Turnout		295,248	62.15	
Total valid votes		282,368	95.64	
Rejected ballots		12,880	4.36	
Majority		19,807	7.01	
Registered electors		475,031		
PTI gain from PML(N)				

== Election 2024 ==
General elections were held on 8 February 2024. Muhammad Ameer Sultan won the election with 199,853 votes.

General election 2024: NA-110 Jhang-III
Party	Candidate	Votes	%	±%
PTI	Muhammad Ameer Sultan (Note: Filed nomination papers as PTI candidate but ECP allowed him to run as an independent)	199,853	58.81	▲26.71
PML(N)	Muhammad Asif Muavia Sial	104,422	30.73	
Others	Others (thirteen candidates)	35,581	10.47	
Turnout		351,019	60.68	▼1.47
Total valid votes		339,856	96.45	
Rejected ballots		11,163	3.55	
Majority		95,431	28.25	▲21.24
Registered electors		578,473		

== See also ==
- NA-109 Jhang-II
- NA-111 Nankana Sahib-I
