= List of schools in Punjab, Pakistan =

The following schools are located in Punjab, Pakistan.

== Schools by district ==
=== Attock ===
- Army Public School and College
- Cadet College Hasan Abdal
- The City School
- Smart School Systems
- Modern Public Schools, Shinbagh
- Dar-e-Arqam Schools
- The Hazro City Girls Higher Secondary School, Hazro
- Sir Syed School, Sanjwal Cantt
- FG Boys High School, Sanjwal Cantt
- FG Girls High School, Sanjwal Cantt

=== Bahawalnagar ===
- Ranger Public School
- Spring Tide English Immersion School
- The Core Schools
- The Educators
- Dar-e-Arqam Schools
- Government High School

=== Bahawalpur ===
- International School of Cordoba
- National Garrison Secondary School (RYK)
- Army Public School & College
- Beaconhouse School System, Model Town
- Sadiq Public School
- Dar-e-Arqam Schools
- The City School
- The Protestant Biblical Institute
- Alpina School BWP
- Dominican Convent Higher Secondary School
- The Central School
- The Educators School
- The Allied School
- Saint Dominic Convent Higher Secondary School

=== Bhakkar ===
- Government High School for Boys Bhakkar
- The Eaglets School - Piala Chowk Bhakkar
- Dar-e-Arqam Schools

=== Chiniot ===
- AL Rehman Public ElemeCampus
- School Thattha Loona
- Government High School for Boys Chiniot
- Government High School for Girls Chiniot
- Dar-e-Arqam Schools
- Chenab School
- GHS CHAK NO 241 JB (BHOWANA)
- Meraaj School (Chiniot)

=== Dera Ghazi Khan ===
- Abdalian Science Higher Secendory School (ASHSS)
- Bloomfield Hall School (BHS)
- The City School (TCS)
- The Educators
- Lyceum High School
- Garrison Public School and College
- KIPS
- Pearl Grammar Public School, Taunsa
- Dar-e-Arqam Schools
- DG School & College
- Government High School for Boys Dera Ghazi Khan
- Government High School for Girls Dera Ghazi Khan
- Ibne Sena Model School
- Modern Education School System, Dramah
- Wisdom Education System, New Model Town

=== Gujranwala ===
- Kin's International Public High School

=== Jhang ===
- Chenab College Jhang
- LIFE International School Jhang

=== Kasur ===
- Al-Falah Model High School, Bonga Balochan
- Al-Ansaar International School, Kasur
- Mayo International Higher Secondary School, Aasadabad
- Government High School for Boys, Kasur
- Govt. Boys High School, Head Balloki
- Dar-e-Arqam Schools
- Ahmad Model School System, Balloki
- Wahid Ideal School Sodiwala, Kasur

=== Khanewal ===
- EFA School System (STARS Campus)

=== Khushab ===
- Allied Schools
- Beaconhouse School System
- Dar-e-Arqam Schools
- Iqbal Public School
- The Right School (Mitha Tiwana Campus) Khushab
- Al Hasnat Public School (Bijar)
- Nobel School System (NSS) Jauharabad, Khushab

=== Layyah ===
- Faisal Public High School
- Beacon Light Public High School
- The Educators
- City Public School
- Allied School, Layyah Campus
- Allied School, Kot Sultan 03008718160
- The Spirit School System

=== Mandi Bahauddin ===
- GC Kids University Mandi Bahauddin
- Government High School for Boys Mandi Bahauddin
- Eman High School Mughal Pura
- The Educators
- Dar-e-Arqam Schools
- Rangers Public School and College Mandi Bahauddin

=== Muzaffargarh ===
- Bright Kids Galaxy School System Basira
- The Educators
- Peace Education School Alipur
- Mairi Darsgah Secondary School Kot Addu

=== Nankana Sahib ===
- Government Guru Nank High School for Boys Nankana Sahib
- Hira Public school and college
- Government girls high school
- Dar-e-Arqam Schools
- The Educators
- White Rose School System

=== Okara ===
- Divisional Public School and College, New District Complex, Okara
- IIUI Schools Okara Campus, Okara
- Beaconhouse School System, Sahiwal Road
- The City School, Okara Branch
- International School of Cordoba, Lahore Branch
- The Educators (Al-Aleem Campus), Okara Branch
- Army Public School, Okara Cantt.
- Convent Girls & Boys High School, Okara
- Cadet College Okara

=== RYK ===
- National Garrison Secondary School
- Oxbridge Secondary School/Colleges
- Army Public School
- Sheikh Zaiyad Public School
- Lahore Garamer High School
- Danish Secondary School
- Doctor Public School
- Allied Public School
- The GHS Comprehensive School

=== Sheikhupura ===
- The National Rise Model School System
- Shaheen Public School, Sharaq Pur Sharif
- The International School System
- Brookfield international grammar school
- Qaisar Girls High School (www.qs.edu.pk)

=== Toba Tek Singh ===
- Dar-e-Arqam Schools
- White Rose School System
- The Educators
- J. M. School System, Gojra
- Brain Cox School System, Toba Tek Singh
- University of Kamalia
