= Zahoor Ahmed Sajid =

Pakistani politician

Member of the Provincial Assembly of the Punjab
- In office 29 November 2002 – 18 November 2007 (14th Assembly)
- Constituency: PP-78 (Jhang-VI)

Personal details
- Born: 12 May 1946 Jhang, Pakistan
- Died: Jhang
- Resting place: Jhang
- Party: Independent
- Other political affiliations: Pakistan Tehreek-e-Insaf
- Parent: Mian Allah Yar alma_mater = Baha-ud-Din Zakariya University, Multan, University of the Punjab, Lahore (father)

Zahoor Ahmed Sajid (Urdu: ظہور احمد ساجد) was a Pakistani politician who had been a member of the Provincial Assembly of Punjab from 2002 till 2007. He also served as Member, District Council Jhang during 1987–91 and 1998–99. He was elected as Nazim Union Council No. 53, Jhang during 2001–2002.

== Early life and education ==
Zahoor was born on 12 May 1946 at Jhang into a farmer family. He obtained his early education from Jhang, LL.B. from Baha-ud-Din Zakariya University, Multan in 1982, and M.A. in political science from the University of the Punjab, Lahore in 1988.

== Political career ==
He was elected to the Provincial Assembly of the Punjab as an independent candidate from Constituency PP-78 (Jhang-VI) in General Elections 2002. He received 34,609 votes and defeated the independent candidate, Syed Sahib Sultan. He joined Makhdoom group in district nazim and councilor seats.

Zahoor was defeated by Mehr Khalid Mahmood Sargana in PP-78 (Jhang-VI) in General Elections 2008.

He served as Member District Council Jhang during 1987–91 and 1998–99. He was elected as Nazim Union Council No. 53, Jhang during 2001–2002.

He showed up for PP-128 Jhang-V and NA-116 Jhang-III seats in general election 2018. He lost PP-128 Jhang-V by Ghazanfar Abbas Shah of PTI and Muhammad ameer sultan of PTI.

His younger brother Riaz Hashmat Janjua, was Member, Provincial Assembly of the Punjab during 1985–88 and 1993–96.

== Family ==
Mian Allah Yar (Father) Hazoor Muhammad Tanvir (Brother) Riaz Hashmat Janjua (Brother)
