= Khawar Rizvi =

Pakistani poet (1938–1981)

Khawar Rizvi خاور رضوي
- سید سبط حسن رضوی
- Syed Sibte Hassan Rizvi
- Born: 1 June 1938
- Died: 15 November 1981 (aged 43); Ahmedpur, Pakistan
- Citizenship: Pakistani
- Occupations: Social security worker, Banker and Poet
- Parents: Syed Najm ul Hassan Rizvi (father); Abida Begum (mother)

Khawar Rizvi (Urdu: خاور رضوی; 1 June 1938 – 15 November 1981) was a Pakistani poet and scholar of Urdu and Persian. Born Syed Sibte Hassan Rizvi, he used the pen name "Khawar"—which means "The East" in Persian—for his poetry and essays.

== Early life and career ==
Khawar Rizvi was born into a Syed family on June 1, 1938. While some sources claim 1936, official documents indicate 1938. His mother, Abida Begum, was a poet, although most of her work was not preserved. His maternal uncle, Dr. Abul Hassan, was a poet and scholar, as was his aunt, Bano Saidpuri. Khawar Rizvi's father, Syed Najm ul Hassan Rizvi, belonged to the armed forces of Pakistan. His son, Dr. Syed Shabih ul Hassan Rizvi, is a teacher, scholar, philanthropist, and chairman of the World Future Forum, a UN-affiliated think tank.

Rizvi received his formal education at Government School, Campbellpur (now Attock), and graduated from Government College Attock. He completed postgraduate studies in literature at the University of Punjab and began his career as a teacher. He later worked in the banking sector. Reportedly motivated by his opposition to exploitation and poverty, he left his banking career despite its security. To serve the public, Khawar joined Pakistan's social security department. He was buried in the graveyard of Ahmad Pur Sial, a town in Jhang District, Pakistan. His death at 43 was widely mourned, especially in South Asia.

== Ideology and activism ==
Rizvi was associated with the Progressive Writers' Movement in the subcontinent of India and Pakistan, and opposed all forms of tyranny, dictatorship, subjugation, and exploitation. His ideology and political beliefs reportedly caused difficulties for him during the era of General Zia-ul-Haq. Rizvi advocated for freedom of expression, civil liberties, human rights, equality, and the alleviation of poverty.

== Tributes and homages ==
Khawar Rizvi’s poetry was acknowledged both during his lifetime and after his death. Several writers and poets, including Ahmad Nadeem Qasimi, Tanveer Sipra, Professor Yousuf Hassan, Amjad Islam Amjad, Munnu Bhai, and Hassan Akhtar Jalil, publicly expressed condolences following his passing. Ahmad Nadeem Qasimi published a note on Rizvi in his literary magazine Funoon, based in Lahore. Khalid Ahmad wrote an article about Rizvi's work in the Daily Jang (Karachi), while Hassan Rizvi and Azhar Javed also wrote about him in the Daily Jang (Lahore) and in the literary magazine Takhleeq, respectively. Mashal, the magazine of Government College Attock, included a section on Rizvi and his poetry. Poets such as Iqbal Kausar, Dr. Saad Ullah Kaleem, Professor Zafar Jaunpuri, and Saeed Jaunpuri also published writings discussing his literary contributions. References to Khawar Rizvi and his son, Shabih-ul-Hassan Rizvi, appear in works by Rashid Amjad, Raghab Shakeeb, and Waqar bin Ellahi. A feature about Rizvi was also included in the children's magazine Kidzine International.

"He was respected as a thinker and scholar throughout his life, though it was so short in years, but too big in deeds. Khawar Rizvi's thought was progressive, he never compromised on any subjugation. Though he was in a high position in the Social Security department, he always defended the rights of the workers. All his life he loved youth and children. He never liked disappointment and negative thinking. He was so full of life that death did not dare to enter his home, but caught him in the middle of way, far from his home in the morning and mourning hours of 15th November, 1981, when he was only 43."
