= Hasoo Balel =

Town in Punjab, Pakistan

Hassu Balail
- Town
- Location within Pakistan
- Coordinates: 31°01′29″N 72°00′22″E
- Country: Pakistan
- Province: Punjab
- District: Jhang

Population (2017 Census of Pakistan)
  - Total: 414,131 (population of Jhang city)
- Time zone: UTC+5 (PST)

Hassu Balail (حسو بلیل, Hassu Balail) is a town of Ahmadpur Sial Tehsil in Jhang District of Punjab province, Pakistan. The town is located near the River Chenab after the River Jhelum merges with the former. The town is located on the Jhang-Layyah, Jhang-Multan Road going to Jhang Sadar. Parco (Pak-Arab Refinery Company) pumping station is near this town.
