= Baloana =

Chund Bharwana
- Village
- Location within Pakistan
- Coordinates: 31°25′01″N 72°15′45″E
- Country: Pakistan
- Province: Punjab
- District: Jhang
- Time zone: UTC+5 (PST)

Baloana is a village of Jhang District, in the Punjab province, Pakistan.
