= Mochiwala =

Pakistani town

- Town
- Location in Pakistan
- Coordinates: 31°17′54″N 72°31′57″E
- Country: Pakistan
- Province: Punjab
- District: Jhang
- Time zone: UTC+5 (PST)

Mochiwala is a town in Pakistan, located 25 km from Jhang and 50 km from Faisalabad on Jhang-Faisalabad road. It is the central headquarters of this area, having facilities like education, health, a union council office, police station, and shopping market (Gojra Mor Mandi).
