= PP-128 Jhang-IV =

Constituency of the Punjabi Provincial Legislature, Pakistan

- Constituency for the Provincial Assembly of Punjab
- Region: Shorkot Tehsil (partly) in Jhang District

Current constituency
- Created from: PP-79 Jhang-VII (2002–2018); PP-128 Jhang-V (2018–2023)

PP-128 Jhang-IV (پی پی-128، جھنگ-4) is a Constituency of Provincial Assembly of Punjab, in Pakistan.

== General elections 2024 ==
Provincial election 2024: PP-128 Jhang-IV
| Party | Candidate | Votes | % | ±% |
|---|---|---|---|---|
| Independent | Ghazanfar Abbas Shah | 62,370 | 42.42 | |
| PML(N) | Khalid Mehmood Sargana | 60,008 | 40.82 | |
| Independent | Suleman Ali (Note: Filed nomination papers as PTI candidate but ECP allowed him to run as an independent) | 6,324 | 4.30 | |
| TLP | Abdul Waheed | 4,955 | 3.37 | |
| Independent | Umar Draz | 4,733 | 3.22 | |
| Independent | Mehar Shahid Saleem | 2,183 | 1.49 | |
| Others | Others (twelve candidates) | 6,452 | 4.38 | |
| Turnout | | 151,876 | 58.00 | |
| Total valid votes | | 147,025 | 96.81 | |
| Rejected ballots | | 4,851 | 3.19 | |
| Majority | | 2,362 | 1.50 | |
| Registered electors | | 261,852 | | |
| hold | | | | |

== General elections 2018 ==
Provincial election 2018: PP-128 Jhang-V
| Party | Candidate | Votes | % | ±% |
|---|---|---|---|---|
| PTI | Ghazanfar Abbas Shah | 50,198 | 40.16 | |
| Independent | Khalid Mahmood | 47,072 | 37.66 | |
| Independent | Muhammad Asif Moavia Sial | 14,776 | 11.82 | |
| TLP | Mahr Zahoor Hussain Sipra | 6,190 | 4.95 | |
| Independent | Zahoor Ahmad Sajid | 3,125 | 2.50 | |
| APML | Syed Aoun Imran Sherazi | 1,410 | 1.13 | |
| Others | Others (six candidates) | 2,215 | 1.77 | |
| Turnout | | 130,463 | 62.50 | |
| Total valid votes | | 124,986 | 95.80 | |
| Rejected ballots | | 5,477 | 4.20 | |
| Majority | | 3,126 | 2.50 | |
| Registered electors | | 208,743 | | |

== General elections 2013 ==
Provincial election 2013: PP-79 Jhang-VII
| Party | Candidate | Votes | % | ±% |
|---|---|---|---|---|
| PML(N) | Mehr Khalid Mahmood Sargana | 29,101 | 29.83 | |
| Independent | Lt. Col.(R) Ghazanfar Abbas Shah | 28,681 | 29.40 | |
| Independent | Madhu Lal Hussain | 19,261 | 19.74 | |
| PTI | Zahoor Ahmed Sajid Janjua | 10,020 | 10.27 | |
| Independent | Mehr Zahoor Hussain Sipra | 6,095 | 6.25 | |
| SIC | Ch. Mubashir Abbas Warriach | 2,167 | 2.22 | |
| Others | Others (sixteen candidates) | 2,245 | 2.30 | |
| Turnout | | 101,770 | 66.97 | |
| Total valid votes | | 97,570 | 95.87 | |
| Rejected ballots | | 4,200 | 4.13 | |
| Majority | | 420 | 0.43 | |
| Registered electors | | 151,961 | | |

== General elections 2008 ==
| Contesting candidates | Party affiliation | Votes polled |

== See also ==
- PP-127 Jhang-III
- PP-129 Jhang-V
