= CCJ =

CCJ may stand for:

- Chenab College Jhang, Institute in Pakistan
- Cadet College Jhelum, Institute in Pakistan
- Calicut International Airport, Kerala , India (IATA code: CCJ)
- Conseil consultatif sur la jeunesse, a non-governmental decision-making body in the Council of Europe.
- Caribbean Court of Justice – also "CCtJ"
- Conference of Chief Justices, in the United States
- Cornway College a private, co-educational, day and boarding school in Zimbabwe.
- Council of Christians and Jews, United Kingdom
- County Court judgment, in England & Wales, court decision that someone owes money
- Cameco, a uranium producer in Canada (NYSE symbol: CCJ)
- Callum Coleman-Jones, Australian rules footballer
- The Johnson–Corey–Chaykovsky reaction, a chemical reaction
- Criminal Courts of Justice, Dublin, the principal courts building for the criminal courts in Ireland.
