= Chak 330 GB =

Coordinates: 30°47′6.65″N 72°20′7.62″E

Chak No. 330 G.B (Urdu: راہلن), also known as Rahlan, is a village (latitude: 31.03035° and longitude: 71.2688601°) in Tehsil Pirmahal, District Toba Tek Singh in Punjab, Pakistan.

== History ==
This city started getting populated in the 1880s. The first people to settle here were five brothers with their wives who were originally from Ludhiana, Punjab, India. As time passed, many other people came here and settled. Agriculture is the main source of income here.

== Religion ==
In February 2017, the village has a population of about 5000 people. Islam is the main religion of the village as 99% population is Muslim. 1% of the population are Christians.

== Castes ==
The majority belongs to Arain sub caste (badhu) which forms 90% of the population. Other castes are in traces and called as kammi (servant group) as like other villages of Punjab, their work is to cook and serve during weddings and funerals, but this tradition is gradually vanishing. Those are Hajaam (barber), Kumhar (potter), Jaulaha (clothier), Mashki (bheesty), Lohaar (blacksmith), Tarkhaan (carpenter), Mochi (cobbler), Teli (oilman), Faqeer (one who gives bath to the deceased). There are also many local castes like Baloch, Sipra, Nonari, Gawaans, Gopay Ra etc. There is also a Syed family.

== Occupations ==
The majority of these people are linked to Agriculture. Some are contributing in other fields of life such as Government and Private sector. There are also some people who run their own businesses. Many people went abroad in the decades of 1960's, 70's and are residing mostly in UK and United States. The younger generation serving in Gulf Countries.

== Suburbs ==
The village has four suburbs.

- Kotli
- Dhoop saarri (دُھوپ سڑی)
- Azafi Aabadi (Basti)
- Samanabad

== Locus ==
The village lies on 30.785973, 72.334508, 2 km from Shorkot Rd, approximately in the center of Pirmahal and Shorkot Cantonment. In East Chak No. 331 G.B Saleem Pur is situated and Chak No. 328 G.B lies in the West. Chak No. 331 G.B Noor Pur is situated in North while suburb Kotli lies in South. There is a bus stop on Shorkot Rd which is at the pivot point of roads to Toba Tek Singh, Pir Mahal and Shorkot Cantonment. The village is also connected with a century old railway line which leads to Lahore from Shorkot Cantonment via Jaranwala, Sheikhupura. The railway station serving this and surrounding villages is known as Naeem Ishfaq Shaheed which is at the center point of Shorkot Cantonment and Pir Mahal.

== Education ==
Literacy rate of the village is more than 90%. The central suburb of the village has a Govt. Primary School for both boys & girls (1 to 5 grade), Govt. Girls High School (1 to 10 grade) and two private high schools (1 to 10 grade). Govt. Primary School is one of the best schools in the District Toba Tek Singh. A religious school (madrasa) is also providing religious education. Other suburbs of the village also have educational institutions.

== Administerial Scenario ==
The village lies in the constituency of NA-113 & PP-121. The village has a union council in suburb Kotli and known as UC-79.
