= Ghazanfar Abbas Shah =

Pakistani politician

Member of the Provincial Assembly of the Punjab
- Incumbent
- Assumed office 8 February 2024

Member of the Provincial Assembly of the Punjab
- In office 15 August 2018 – 14 January 2023
- Constituency: PP-128 Jhang-V

Personal details
- Party: IPP (2025-present)
- Other political affiliations: PMLN (2024-2025); IPP (2023-2024); PMLN (2022-2023); PTI (2018-2022)

Col.(R) Ghazanfar Abbas Shah is a Pakistani politician. He is an incumbent member of the Provincial Assembly of the Punjab since 8 February 2024. He also had been a member of the Provincial Assembly of the Punjab from August 2018 till January 2023.

== Political career ==
He ran for the seat of the Provincial Assembly of the Punjab as an independent candidate from PP-78 (Jhang-VI) in the 2008 Punjab provincial election but was unsuccessful. He received 22,808 votes and lost the seat to Mehr Khalid Mahmood Sargana.

He ran for the seat of the Provincial Assembly of the Punjab as an independent candidate from PP-79 (Jhang-III) in the 2013 Punjab provincial election but was unsuccessful. He received 28,681 votes and lost the seat to Mehr Khalid Mahmood Sargana.

He was elected to the Provincial Assembly of the Punjab as a candidate of the Pakistan Tehreek-e-Insaf (PTI) from PP-128 (Jhang-V) in the 2018 Punjab provincial election.

He was re-elected to the Provincial Assembly of the Punjab as PTI supported independent candidate from PP-128 Jhang-V in the 2024 Punjab provincial election.

He joined Pakistan Muslim League-Nawaz (PML-N) following his election.
