= Gujraniwala =

- Location within Pakistan
- Coordinates: 30.57°N 71.29°E
- Country: Pakistan
- Province: Punjab
- Elevation: 128 m (420 ft)
- Time zone: UTC+5 (PST)

Gujraniwala is a village of Jhang District in the Punjab province of Pakistan. It is located at 30°57'0N 71°29'50E at an altitude of 128 metres (423 feet).
