= Shorkot Cantonment =

Military or police quarters in Punjab, Pakistan

- Cantonment
- Location within Pakistan
- Coordinates: 31°25′01″N 72°15′45″E
- Country: Pakistan
- Province: Punjab
- District: Jhang
- Time zone: UTC+5 (PST)

Shorkot Cantonment (Urdu: شورکوٹ چھاؤنی) is a cantonment area adjacent to PAF Base Rafiqui, 16 kilometers (9.9 mi) east from Shorkot city in Jhang district of Punjab province of Pakistan.

It is famous for Pakistan Air Force Base 'Rafiqui'.

Shorkot Cantonment Junction railway station is located in this cantonment.
