= Garh Maharaja =

Garh Maharaja گڑھ مہاراجا
- City
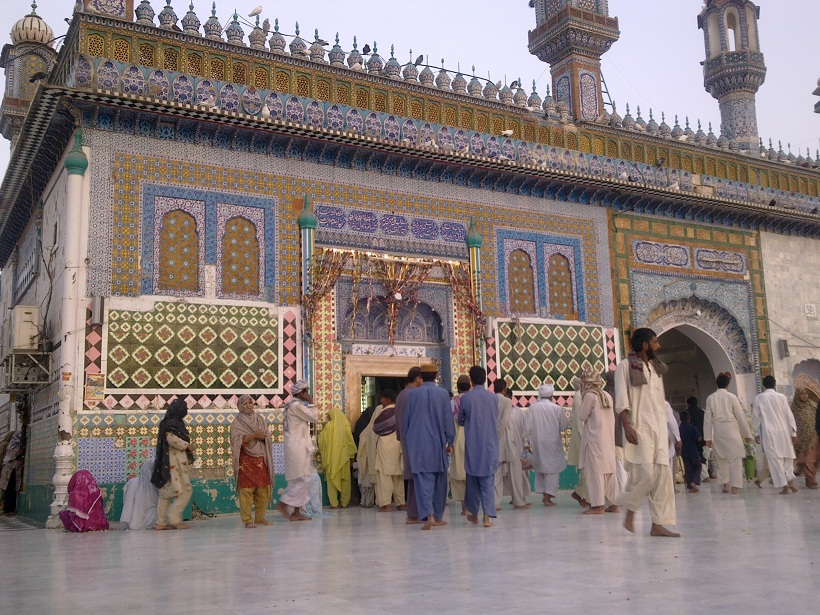
- Shrine of Sultan Bahu in Garh Maharaja

- Location within Pakistan
- Coordinates: 30.50°N 71.54°E
- Country: Pakistan
- Province: (Punjab, Pakistan) Punjab
- District: Jhang

Government
- Time zone: UTC+5 (PST)

Garh Maharaja (Urdu: گڑھ مہاراجا) is a city and Municipality in Ahmedpur Sial Tehsil in Jhang District in Punjab province of Pakistan. It is located at 30°50'0" North, 71°54'0" East. The shrine of the 17th-century mystic and Punjabi Muslim poet Sultan Bahu is located in Garh Maharaja. It is a popular and frequently-visited Sufi shrine. Garh Maharaja is located 17 km from Shorkot, 38 km Kot Bahadur Shah, and 65 km from Chowk Azam.
