= Saima Akhtar Bharwana =

Pakistani female politician

- Born: April 24, 1969 (age 57); Shorkot, Punjab, Pakistan
- Occupation: Politician

Saima Akhtar Bharwana (born April 24, 1969, in Shorkot) is a Pakistani politician. She is a former Member of National Assembly of Pakistan form Constituency NA-90 (Jhang-V).

== Early life ==
Akhtar was born on April 24, 1969, in Shorkot, Punjab to an agriculturist. In 1990, she completed her B.A from Lahore College for Women University.

== Career ==
She successfully ran for the Parliament in the 2008 general election from the constituency NA-90. She then joined Pakistan Muslim League (Q). Later in 2012 she joined Pakistan Muslim League (N). She was a runner up in the 2013 Pakistani general election.
