= Ragging in Pakistani colleges and universities =

Hazing practices in Pakistani colleges

Ragging (locally referred to as fooling) is a practice in many Pakistani colleges, universities and hostels where senior students subject freshers or junior students to various forms of harassment, humiliation, or coercion. While sometimes defended as an initiation rite or lighthearted tradition, in many documented cases, ragging has serious negative consequences, including psychological distress, academic decline, physical abuse, and violations of dignity.

The practice is prevalent in both public and private institutions, particularly in hostels and during orientation periods. Unlike in neighbouring countries such as India and Sri Lanka, where specific anti-ragging laws and helplines exist, Pakistan lacks a uniform national legislation targeting ragging directly, relying instead on general harassment policies and institutional measures.

== Background ==
Ragging in Pakistan has its roots in old educational cultures where seniority and hierarchy play a strong role. Over time, ragging has become the norm in many public and private institutions as part of the “freshers’ experience”. It can occur in academic settings, hostels/residential settings, orientation periods, and informal senior-junior interactions. Some students and institutions view milder forms of ragging as bonding or tradition. However, others view it as a serious abuse of power.

== Prevalence and forms ==
- Verbal/psychological ragging: Jokes, insults, shame, hazing, harassment that may cause fear or anxiety. For instance, newcomers may be asked to sing, dance, or perform humiliating tasks.
- Physical ragging: Includes forced physical tasks, rough behaviour, sometimes dangerous or involving chemicals or harmful substances. For instance, throwing chemical-filled water balloons, burning skin, etc.
- Sexual/gendered abuse: Cases where juniors are forced into embarrassing/gendered situations, sometimes in the presence of opposite gender classmates, or worse.
- Hostel ragging: Many incidents occur in hostels where seniors may have greater control and opportunity to impose humiliation.

== Impacts on students ==
- Psychological harm: Trauma, anxiety, depression, loss of self-esteem. In some cases, students have reported taking medication.
- Dropout or avoidance behaviour: Some students avoid continuing studies in institutions known for severe ragging, or avoid reporting incidents.
- Physical injuries: Where pranks or ragging escalate into physical assault or dangerous acts (burn injuries, scars).
- Humiliation and social stigma: Expressing embarrassment in front of colleagues, sometimes being forced into inappropriate positions.

== Notable incidents ==
=== University of Punjab ===
In the University of Punjab, the new students in the Fine Arts department were reportedly forced to undress in front of other students during ragging.

=== National College of Arts ===
In the National College of Arts (NCA), Lahore, seniors allegedly threw bags and balloons filled with chemicals/petrol at freshmen during ragging, causing burn injuries.

=== Peshawar ===
In Peshawar, some families have sought police intervention to curb fooling/ragging in colleges after severe humiliation incidents.

== Legal status and institutional responses ==
=== Lack of uniform law ===
Unlike some countries where anti-ragging laws are clearly formulated, Pakistan does not have a strong central law specifically targeting ragging across all institutions. Many calls from civil society and opinion pieces push for legislation.

=== Administrative responses ===
Some colleges and universities issue warnings, have disciplinary committees, and may suspend students. Some police involvement occurs when incidents are severe or a complaint is filed by a parent.

=== Lack of reporting or enforcement ===
Many incidents go unreported. Institutional accountability is often weak. If no one reports, elders can act with impunity.

=== Educational institutions and policies ===
Some institutions have anti-harassment policies and guidelines (especially in the HEI context) to provide a safe environment. The Higher Education Commission (HEC) sets policies for sexual harassment, etc., although ragging is less consistently regulated.
