= Defence Authority Degree College =

D A Degree College
- Khayaban-e-Rahat, Phase-6, DHA, Karachi, Pakistan

Information
- Type: Degree college
- Motto: Knowledge Is Power
- Established: 1988
- Administrator: Brig Shahid Hassan Ali
- Principal: Syed Siraj Munir
- Staff: 60
- Faculty: 39
- Enrollment: 1200
- Color: Navy Blue
- Athletics: Defencian
- Affiliation: University of Karachi; Board of Intermediate Education Karachi
- Website: dadegreecollege.edu.pk

The Defence Authority Degree College for Boys & Girls, also known as DADC, is a co-education degree college located at D.H.A., Karachi, Sindh, Pakistan.

DHA Degree College started functioning in the then SKBZ High School building in September 1988. The college was shifted to its present campus on September 3, 1990.

Like any other educational institutions of the Defence Housing Authority, the college runs under the DHA Administrator who is a serving Brigadier of the Pakistan Army. Commander 5 Corps Karachi is the President of the Executive Board of the Authority and all the educational institutions of DHA function under his guidance. The college is affiliated with the University of Karachi for Graduation and Post Graduation Programmes, and to the Board of Intermediate Education Karachi, for Intermediate programmes.
