= Muhammad Arif Khan Rajbana Sial =

Pakistani politician and chieftain

Khan Muhammad Arif Khan Rajbana Sial
- خان محمد عارف خان
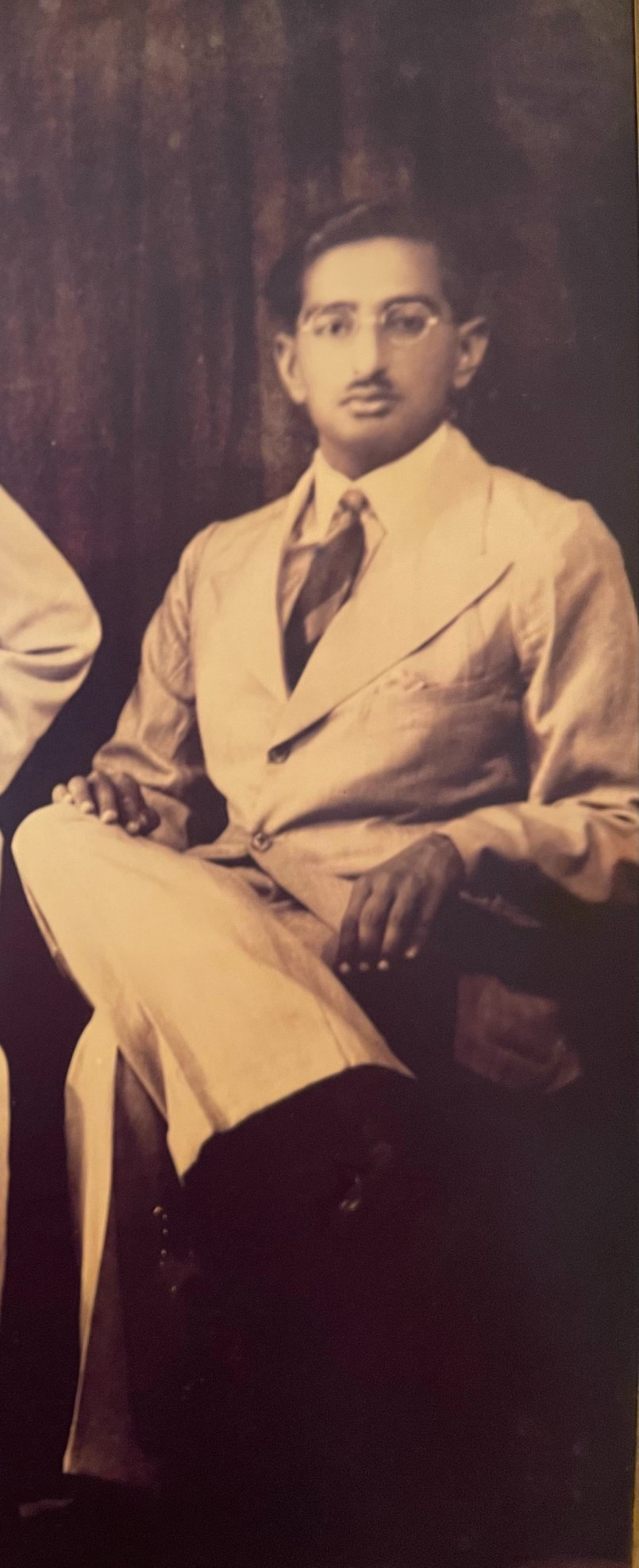

Pakistani politician

Personal details
- Born: 1913 Badh Rajbana, British India
- Died: 29 September 2010 (aged 96–97) Jhang City, Pakistan
- Resting place: Badh Rajbana, Pakistan
- Party: All India Muslim League
- Occupation: Feudal lord/politician

Khan Muhammad Arif Khan Rajbana Sial (Urdu: خان عارف خان) was a veteran politician, feudal lord and tribal chieftain from Badh Rajbana, Shorkot, Pakistan.

== Early life and education ==
Khan was educated at Aligarh Muslim University, Aligarh. With his cousin, Mahr Ghulam Abbas Khan, they inherited 30,000 acres of land each at a young age. This included the entirety of Badh Rajbana Janoobi, Badh Rajbana Shumali, Bela Badh, Khanpur, Anayat Shah, Dhoor Kot, Qasim Wala and Nawabpur villages. This area is collectively known as Badh Rajbana.

== Political career ==
He is known for being a key figure in the independence movement and a close associate of the Quaid-e-Azam Muhammad Ali Jinnah. His name is noted among the pioneers of the Pakistan Movement.

=== Political views ===
He was ardently pro-democracy and supported the vision of the Quaid. He openly and publicly opposed Field Marshal Ayub Khan while supporting the Fatima Jinnah, sister of Pakistan's founder, in the 1965 presidential election.

A pro-democracy rally led by Khan Muhammad Arif Khan in Jhang, 1963

He also played a pivotal role in defeating General Zia-Ul-Haq's candidate, Khawaja Muhammad Safdar, for the post of speaker of the National Assembly in 1985.

=== Political career ===
He was elected to the All-India Constituent Assembly in 1946 as a member of the All India Muslim League. He was elected to parliament several times, the last time from Shorkot in 1985. He was the chairman of the District Council of Jhang on numerous occasions.

He held the office of The Honourable Chief Whip for the All-India Muslim League, a position he retained till after independence. He remained the District President of Jhang for the Muslim League throughout his political career. He also served as a provincial and federal minister at various stages in his career.

== Family ==
He was the son of Nawab Mahr Khan Muhammad Rajbana Sial, who was a first-class Grand Zaildar, (which was the highest cadre) he held one of the largest zails in the province.

Khan Arif Khan was the Sardar of the prominent Rajbana Sial Tribe of Jhang.

His nephew and son in-law Khan Munawar Ali Khan Rajbana Sial has been the chairman of Tehsil Council Shorkot/Ahmedpur Sial on several occasions, as has his cousin, Mahr Ghulam Abbas Khan Rajbana Sial.

His grandson, Khan Jawad Ali Khan Rajbana Sial, is also a former parliamentarian.
