= IIUI Schools =

Coordinates: 32.424058°N 73.589902°E

- Punjab; Pakistan

Information
- Opened: April 14, 2011
- Founder: IIUI
- Status: Open
- Session: August to June
- Grades: Playgroup to O/A-levels
- Schedule: Day
- Curriculum: "IIUI Schools Curriculum"
- Colors: Yellow, Red, Light Grey
- Phone: (051) 9262226
- Location: Click to see location map

IIUI Schools, is a school system launched by International Islamic University, Islamabad in 2010 on occasion of its Silver Jubilee (1985–2010). The IIUI Schools, also known as International Islamic University Schools, are the first school system established by a university in Pakistan, aimed to assist in creating high achievers with an advanced level of independent thinking, impeccable character and remarkable confidence in line with the teachings and norms taught by Islam.

== General Information ==
=== The School Grades ===
Playgroup to O/A-levels and Matric to HSSC
IIUI Schools provide education from Playgroup to GCE O/A-levels and Matric to HSSC. Phalia Campus is now offering classes from Playgroup to O/A-levels, and will gradually extend to A-levels in the coming years.

=== Academic Year ===
The school year is divided into two terms:
First term: August to December
Second term: January to June

=== Curriculum ===
IIUI Schools follow an in-house curriculum which is designed to prepare students for IGCSE and GCE O/A-levels, and is based on international standards and core Islamic values. The IIUI Schools Curriculum focuses on practical and interactive learning programs relying not only on total learning within the classroom but also based on outside academic activities such as presentations, conferences, seminars and meetings for students of grade 1 onward.

== Subjects ==
The school offers following subjects, at different levels.

* Arabic	* General Science	* Poems & Stories
* Arts and crafts	* Geography	* Quranic Curriculum
* Citizenship	* History	* Social Studies
* English	* ICT	* Sports/ Fitness
* Environmental Studies	* Mathematics	* Urdu
* General Knowledge	* Naazra/Tajweed	

== Facilities ==
- Learning Centers
- ICT Lab
- Library
- Playground
- Tuck shop
- Transport

== Campuses of IIUI Schools ==
Some of the existing and upcoming campuses of IIUI Schools are:,

- Abbottabad Campus
- Attock Campus
- Adyala Campus, Rawalpindi
- Scheme III Chaklala Campus, Rawalpindi
- Bhalwal Campus
- Chakwal City Campus
- Chak Shahzad Campus Islamabad.
- Dera Ghazi Khan Campus
- D. I. Khan Campus
- Canal Road Campus, Faisalabad
- Civil Lines Campus, Faisalabad
- Ali Pur Chattha Campus, Gujranwala
- Gujar Khan Campus
- Gujranwala City, Campus
- Gujranwala Cantt, Campus
- Gujrat City Campus
- Hyderabad Campus
- Bhara Kahu Campus, Islamabad
- Model Town Humak Campus, Islamabad
- Shehzad Town Campus, Islamabad
- I-8 Sector Campus, Islamabad
- Jhelum Campus
- Joher Abad Campus
- Khyber Campus, Peshawar
- Larkana campus (wakeel colony Larkana 0744752052 )
- Kohat Campus
- Township Campus Lahore
- Shabzazar Campus, Lahore
- Mansehra City Campus
- Mirpur City Campus
- Mardan City Campus
- Multan City Campus
- Narowal City Campus
- Nowshera Campus
- Okara Campus
- Phalia Campus, Mandi Bahauddin
- Warsak Road Campus, Peshawar
- Khayaban-e-Sirsyed Campus, Rawalpindi
- Gulrez Housing Scheme Campus, Rawalpindi
- Gulzar-e-Quaid Campus, Rawalpindi
- Satellite Town Campus, Rawalpindi
- Tulsa Road Campus, Rawalpindi
- Westridge Campus, Rawalpindi
- Quaid-e-Azam Colony Campus, Quaid-e-Azam Colony, Chakri Road, Rawalpindi
- Rahim Yar Khan Campus
- Sahiwal Campus
- Sargodha City Campus
- Shakargarh Campus
- Sialkot City Campus
- Swabi Campus
- Swat Campus
- Talagang City Campus
- Wah Cantt Campus
- Wazirabad Campus
- Patoki Campus
- Renalakhurd Campus
- IIUI Schools, Haripur Campus Campus Address: Abdullah Street, Shakar Shah Road.
