= Government Graduate College of Science =

Graduate college in Lahore

- گورنمنٹ گریجویٹ کالج آف سائنس
- Logo of GGCS
- Other name: Government College of Science (GCS)
- Motto: سَخَّرَ لَكُم مَّا فِي السَّمَاوَاتِ وَمَا فِي الْأَرْضِ (Arabic)
- Motto in English: "Whatever is in the Earth and Heavens has been Subject to You"
- Type: Public
- Established: August 8, 1973; 53 years ago
- Affiliations: Higher Education Commission and BISE Lahore
- Principal: Prof. Skhawat Ali Dogar
- Vice-principal: Prof. Muhammad Zahid Rafiq Bhatti
- Administrative staff: 60+
- Location: Lahore, Punjab, Pakistan; 31°30′31″N 74°17′45″E
- Campus: 45 acres (18 ha); Urban
- Colors: Maroon, white and black
- Website: www.gcslahore.edu.pk

The Government Graduate College of Science, Wahdat Road (GGCS) in Lahore, Punjab, Pakistan is located along the Wahdat Road in the locality of Allama Iqbal Town (hence its name). The college was founded on 8 August 1973; Prof. M. A. Saeed was its first principal.

== The Institution ==
The college, came into being on 8 August 1973, in compliance with the orders of the then Governor of the Punjab, after merging Government Superior Science College, Lahore and Government Degree College, Wahdat Road, Lahore. At the same time the building which was constructed to house Govt. Intermediate college for Girls, Gulberg, Lahore and which remained unutilized, was also annexed to the college building and was named Government College of Science, Wahdat Road, Lahore. Thus the Government College of Science emerged from the blend of these three institutions and a renowned educationist, Prof. M.A. Saeed was appointed its first principal. The new college started functioning with new vigor, ambitions and targets. The post-graduate teaching was started in Physics (1970), Chemistry (1974), Economics and Mathematics (1994) and Zoology (2005).

== Campus ==
The college has a separate new block having master's classes in mathematics and economics and a newly constructed commerce/computer block to accommodate the increasing number of students and to introduce other teaching disciplines in future.

The college is affiliated with the Board of Intermediate and Secondary Education, Lahore and University of the Punjab for its BS four-year degree program and post-graduate classes.

== Academics ==
The BS four-year program was started in 2010 with the introduction of sixteen disciplines including English, Economics, Islamiat, BBA, Chemistry, Statistics, Physics, Sociology, Botany, Zoology, Mass Communication, Mathematics, Information Technology, Political Science, Education and Urdu.

Self supporting BS Four Years Degree Program was started in 2019. It is only for boys. The institution is currently offering Degree of English, Botany, Chemistry, BBA, Information Technology, Zoology and Physics.

The college won the Board Championship in boxing in 2004-05. To boost up the sports activity, a boxing ring has been set up on the college campus.

== History ==
The college by its present name came into being on 8 August 1973, in compliance with the orders of the then Governor of the Punjab, after merging Government Superior Science College, Lahore and Government Degree College, Wahdat Road, Lahore. At the same time the building which was constructed to house Government Intermediate college for Girls, Gulberg, Lahore and which remained unutilized, was also annexed to the college building and was named Government College of Science, Wahdat Road, Lahore. Prof. M. A. Saeed was appointed its first principal.

== Department of English ==
There is a department of English Language and Literature in the college. This department is located opposite to the principal office. The faculty of English is considered to be the most powerful in the college as they have the highest number of people in college administration. The department has around 20 members.

These are the notable teachers of this department with high repute in the education sector:

- Mr. Asif Mahmood Shaheen (Assoc. Professor And Head of Department)
- Mr. Saleem Ahsan (Assoc. Professor)
- Ms. Saima Turab (Assoc. Professor)
- Mrs. Nighat Iftikhar (Assoc. Professor)
- Mr. Rana Yousaf (Asst. Professor)
- Mrs. Hafsa Khan (Lecturer)
- Ms. Aisha (Lecturer)

== Department of Botany ==
Mr. Prof. Mukhtar Hussain Shah is the Head of Department of Botany. Following are the notable teachers and instructors of this department:

- Mst. Nasira Parveen (Assoc. Professor)
- Dr. Raza Hafeez Ahmad (Assoc. Professor)
- Dr. Mehwish (now in GCU)

== Sports and co-curricular activities ==
The college has a sports board and a societies board which organize sports and extra-curricular activities.

- Annual Sports Gala
- Hajverian Literary Week

== Notable alumni ==
- Allah Ditta Sharif
- Bilal U. Haq
- Mian Amer Mahmood
