= Mehr Khalid Mahmood Sargana =

Pakistani politician

Member of the Provincial Assembly of the Punjab
- In office 2002 – 31 May 2018

Personal details
- Born: 1 January 1968 (age 58)
- Party: Pakistan Muslim League (N)

Punjab Assembly Lahore

Mehr Khalid Mahmood Sargana is a Pakistani politician who was a Member of the Provincial Assembly of the Punjab, from 2002 to May 2018.

== Early life and education ==
He was born on 1 January 1968.

He graduated in 1992 from University of the Punjab and has the degree of Bachelor of Arts.

== Political career ==
He was elected to the Provincial Assembly of the Punjab as a candidate of Pakistan Muslim League (Q) (PML-Q) from Constituency PP-77 (Jhang-V) in the 2002 Pakistani general election. He received 37,172 votes and defeated Abol-Hassan Ansari, a candidate of Muttahida Majlis-e-Amal (MMA). In the same election, he ran for the seat of the Provincial Assembly of the Punjab as an independent candidate from Constituency PP-78 (Jhang-VI) and for the seat of the National Assembly of Pakistan from Constituency NA-89 (Jhang-IV) but was unsuccessful. He received 539 votes from Constituency PP-78 (Jhang-VI) and lost the seat to Zahoor Ahmed Sajid Janjua, a candidate of National Alliance. He received 122 votes from Constituency NA-89 (Jhang-IV) and lost the seat to an independent candidate, Muhammad Azam Tariq.

He was re-elected to the Provincial Assembly of the Punjab as a candidate of PML-Q from Constituency PP-78 (Jhang-VI) in the 2008 Pakistani general election. He received 27,286 votes and defeated Mian Zahoor Sajid, an independent candidate.

He was re-elected to the Provincial Assembly of the Punjab as a candidate of Pakistan Muslim League (N) (PML-N) from Constituency PP-79 (Jhang-VII) in the 2013 Pakistani general election. He received 29,101 votes and defeated an independent candidate, Ghazanfar Abbas Shah.
