= Sahibzada Nazir Sultan =

Pakistani politician (1944–2022)

Sahibzada Muhammad Nazir Sultan
- صاحبزادہ محمد نذیرسلطان

Member of the National Assembly of Pakistan
- In office 1 June 2013 – 31 May 2018
- Constituency: NA-90 (Jhang-II)
- In office 1988–1996
- In office 1970–1977
- In office 1977–1977

Personal details
- Born: 12 February 1944
- Died: 5 December 2022 (aged 78) Lahore, Punjab, Pakistan
- Children: Muhammad Ameer Sultan

Sahibzada Muhammad Nazir Sultan (Urdu: صاحبزادہ محمد نذیر سلطان; 12 February 1944 – 5 December 2022) was a Pakistani politician who had been a member of the National Assembly of Pakistan a number of times, between 1970 and May 2018, he is most senior parliamentarian who served in 1970 and 1977 assembly.

During this period, he won election to the National Assembly six times and was defeated thrice.

== Early life ==
Sultan was born on 12 February 1944.

== Political career ==
Sultan was elected to the National Assembly of Pakistan as a candidate of Markazi Jamiat Ulema-e-Pakistan from Constituency NW-48 (Jhang-III) in the 1970 Pakistani general election.

Sultan was re-elected to the National Assembly from Constituency NA-67 (Jhang) as a candidate of Pakistan Peoples Party (PPP) in the 1977 Pakistani general election.

Sultan was re-elected to the National Assembly from Constituency NA-70 (Jhang-V) as a candidate of PPP in the 1988 Pakistani general election. He received 61,550 votes and defeated a candidate of Islami Jamhoori Ittehad (IJI).

Sultan was re-elected to the National Assembly from Constituency NA-70 (Jhang-V) as a candidate of Pakistan Democratic Alliance (PDA) in the 1990 Pakistani general election. He received 58,892 votes and defeated a candidate of IJI.

Sultan was re-elected to the National Assembly from Constituency NA-70 (Jhang-V) as a candidate of PPP in the 1993 Pakistani general election. He received 63,516 votes and defeated a candidate of Pakistan Muslim League (N) (PML-N).

Sultan contested election for the National Assembly Constituency NA-70 (Jhang-V) as a candidate of PPP in the 1997 Pakistani general election, but was unsuccessful. He received 33,483 votes and lost the seat to a candidate of PML-N.

Sultan ran for the seat of the National Assembly as a candidate of National Alliance from Constituency NA-90 (Jhang-V) in the 2002 Pakistani general election, but was unsuccessful. He received 56,180 votes and lost the seat to an independent candidate, Saima Akhtar Bharwana.

Sultan ran for the seat of the National Assembly from Constituency NA-90 (Jhang-V) as a candidate of Pakistan Muslim League (Q) in the 2008 Pakistani general election, but was unsuccessful. He received 58,099 votes and lost the seat to Bharwana again.

Sultan was re-elected to the National Assembly as an independent candidate from Constituency NA-90 (Jhang-II) in the 2013 Pakistani general election. He received 52,476 votes and defeated Saima Bharwana. He joined PML-N in May 2013.

As of September 2017, he was the last serving member of the National Assembly who was first elected in the 1970 general election.

In May 2018, he quit PML-N and joined Pakistan Tehreek-e-Insaf (PTI).

== Death ==
Sultan died on 5 December 2022, at the age of 78.
