= Ahmadpur Sial Tehsil =

Tehsil in Punjab, Pakistan

Ahmadpur Sial Tehsil تحصِيل احمد پُور سيال
- Tehsil
- Country: Pakistan
- Province: Punjab
- District: Jhang
- Time zone: UTC+5 (PST)
- Number of towns: 1

Ahmadpur Sial (Urdu: تحصِيل احمد پُور سيال), is a tehsil in Jhang District, Punjab, Pakistan. The city of Ahmedpur Sial is the administrative capital of the tehsil. The tehsil used to be part of Shorkot Tehsil.

== History ==
The Ahmadpur and Garh Mahraja domains were added to the possessions of the Rajbana Sial tribe who had driven out the Baloch tribes to the Thal and defeated the Nawab of Multan by the late 1700s under its tribal chief, Mahr Rajab Khan Sial. The present-day Ahmadpur Sial tehsil and its surroundings constituted the tribal estate of the Rajbana tribe until the advent of the Sikh Raj. The tribe held the tract of land from their seat of power in Badh Rajbana, Shorkot up until the Kunal Khokhar, into the Muzaffargarh boundary and several outpost villages in the Thal.
