= Muhammad Ameer Sultan =

Pakistani politician

Member of the National Assembly of Pakistan
- Incumbent
- Assumed office 29 February 2024
- Constituency: NA-110 Jhang-III
- In office 15 August 2018 – 25 January 2023
- Preceded by: Sahibzada Nazir Sultan
- Constituency: NA-116 (Jhang-III)

Personal details
- Born: 22 March 1976 (age 50) Jhang, Punjab, Pakistan
- Party: PTI (2018-present)
- Parent: Sahibzada Nazir Sultan (father)

Muhammad Ameer Sultan (Urdu: محمد امیر سلطان) is a Pakistani politician who has been a member of the National Assembly of Pakistan since February 2024 and previously served in this position from August 2018 till January 2023.

== Early life ==
Ameer Sultan was born on March 22, 1976, to Muhammad Nazir Sultan. He spent most of his childhood in Lahore, and grew up in a political family. He graduated from the University of Pennsylvania with a master's degree in law in 2002.

He has a son named Sahibzada Ibrahim Sultan.

== Political career ==
He was elected to the National Assembly of Pakistan from NA-116 (Jhang-III) as a candidate of Pakistan Tehreek-e-Insaf (PTI) in the 2018 Pakistani general election. He received 90,649 votes and defeated Muhammad Asif Muavia Sial, an independent candidate.

In November 2018, he was appointed Federal Parliamentary Secretary for National Food Security and Research.

He was re-elected to the National Assembly from NA-110 Jhang-III as an independent candidate supported by PTI in the 2024 Pakistani general election. He received votes and defeated Muhammad Asif Muavia Sial, a candidate of Pakistan Muslim League (N) (PML(N)).

== More Reading ==
- List of members of the 15th National Assembly of Pakistan
