= Dar-e-Arqam Schools =

- Lahore, Punjab; Pakistan

Information
- Type: Private
- Motto: Excellence in this World & the World hereafter.
- Established: 28 December 1990
- Founder: Irfan Ahmad
- Chairman: Irfan Ahmad
- Enrollment: >Over 200,000 students
- Language: english-medium education
- Campuses: 700+
- Colors: green & white
- Website: Official website

Dar-e-Arqam Schools System (Urdu: دارِ ارقم سکولز) is one of the largest school systems in Pakistan. The first branch of this school system was inaugurated in Sargodha on 28 December 1990. Irfan Ahmad, the chairman and head of Dar-e-Arqam Schools laid its foundation with the Quranic vision of Excellence in this World and hereafter. Irfan Ahmad is an eminent scholar, islamic speaker and chairman of Dar-e-Arqam Schools Pakistan. Thereafter gradually, now the school group educates more than 450,000 students and has more than 750+ branches in 150 cities across the Pakistan.
