= Ahmadpur Sial =

Town in Punjab, Pakistan

Ahmad Pur Sial احمد پُور سیال
- Town
- Location within Pakistan
- Coordinates: 30.41°N 71.46°E
- Country: Pakistan
- Province: Punjab
- District: Jhang
- Tehsil: Ahmadpur Sial
- Elevation: 119 m (390 ft)

Population
  - Total: 31,216
- Time zone: UTC+5 (PST)

Ahmad Pur Sial (Urdu: احمد پور سیال), is a town in Jhang District in the Punjab province of Pakistan. The town is the headquarters of Ahmadpur Sial Tehsil.

== History ==
Ahmadpur and Garh Maharaja domains were added to the possessions of the Rajbana Sial tribe who had driven out the Baloch to the Thal and defeated the Muzaffar Khan Sadozai by the late 1700s under its tribal chief, Mahr Rajab Khan Sial. The tribe from then onwards held the tract of land from their seat of power in Badh Rajbana, Shorkot up to Kundal Khokhar, into the Muzaffargarh boundary and several villages in the Thal region.
