= Shorkot Tehsil =

Pakistani administrative area

Shorkot Tehsil تحصیل شورکوٹ
- Tehsil
- Tehsil Municipal Administration logo
- Country: Pakistan
- Region: (Punjab, Pakistan) Punjab
- District: Jhang
- Union councils: 29

Government
  - Type: Tehsil Municipal Administration
  - Administrator: Imran Qureshi
  - Municipal Officer: Khalid Iqbal Malik

Population (2017 Census of Pakistan)
  - Tehsil: 548,626
  - Urban: 73,741
  - Rural: 474,885
- Time zone: UTC+5 (PST)
  - Summer (DST): UTC+6 (PDT)

Shorkot (Urdu: تحصیل شورکوٹ) is a tehsil in Jhang District, Punjab, Pakistan. It is subdivided into 29 Union Councils. The city of Shorkot is the headquarters of the tehsil.

== Language ==
A Punjabi dialect of Jhangochi is spoken by the majority of the people in the rural areas, and mainstream Punjabi language in the cities of Jhang district.

== Union Councils ==
The following are a list of Union Councils that form Shorkot Tehsil:

- PO khas Allah Yar Jutta
- Alipur
- Basti Karam
- Basti Sultan
- Bohwa
- Chak 17/JB
- Chak 19/JB
- Chak 20/JB
- Chak 21/JB
- Chak 25/JB
- Chak 27/JB
- Chak 29/JB
- Chak 30/JB
- Chak 33/JB
- Chak 35/JB
- Chak 39/JB
- Chak 43/JB
- Chak 46/JB
- Chak 48/JB
- Chak 51/JB
- Chak No. 493 Batianwala
- Dhing Shah
- Jalalpur
- Jhangwala
- Karamabad
- Khurrianwala
- Miana Channu
- Shorkot city
- Sialkot
- Toba Rukan Shah
- Waryam

== Tourist attractions ==
- Shrine of Sultan Bahu, a 17th-century scholar and Punjabi Sufi poet.
- Shrine of Majhi Sultan situated in Mouza Majhi Sultan, 4 km away from Chak no 481 J.B. Botay wali, Toba Tek Singh- Majhi Sultan Road
- Shrine of Baba Jhaly Shah and Baba Chanan Shah situated in Chak no 481 J.B. Botay wali, Toba Tek Singh- Majhi Sultan Road

== Notable people ==
- Muhammad Arif Khan Rajbana Sial
- Ameer Sultan
- Sahibzada Nazir Sultan
