= Chenab College Jhang =

College in Punjab, Pakistan

- چناب کالج جھنگ
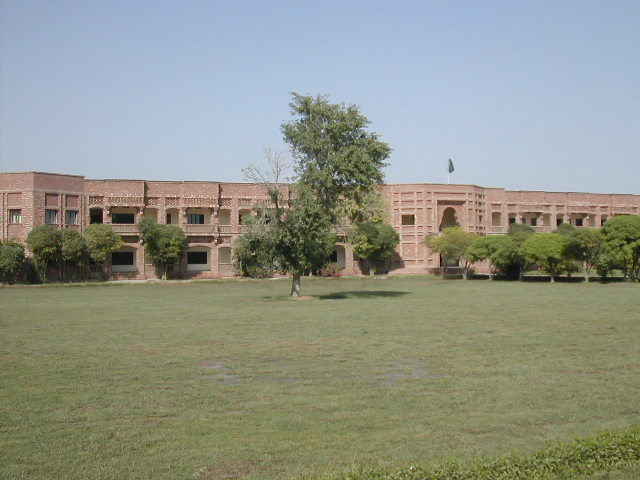
- Other name: CCJ
- Motto: Aspire and Achieve
- Type: Independent/Semigovt/Punjab
- Established: 1991
- Parent institution: Chenab College
- Affiliations: Board of Intermediate and Secondary Education, Faisalabad; Cambridge Assessment International Education
- Chairman: Babar Sahib Din
- Superintendent: Mr Arshad
- Principal: Prof. Muhammad Imran Naik
- Director: Dr. Imtiaz Mohsin
- Location: Jhang, Punjab, Pakistan; 31°20′16″N 72°22′21″E
- Campus: 150 acres (0.61 km^{2})
- Colors: Blue and yellow
- Website: www.chenab.edu.pk

Chenab College Jhang (also known as CCJ) is a public college in Jhang, Punjab, Pakistan. It was established on self-help basis in 1991. Chenab College Jhang is a main campus of Chenab College group that is 12 km (7.5 mi) from the District Courts of Jhang Saddar on Jhang-Chiniot Road. The college estate covers 208 acres (84 ha), out of which more than 150 acres (61 ha) are enclosed by boundary walls.

== Colleges ==
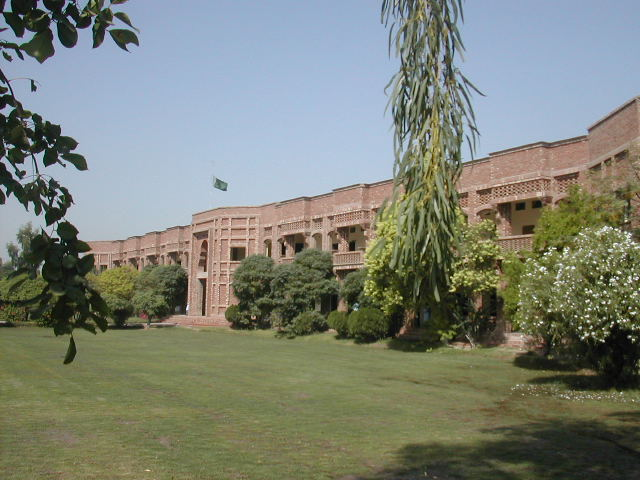
A view of the senior wing T-1 taken from near the aviary

Following Colleges are part of the Chenab College Group:

- Chenab College, Chiniot
- Chenab College, Shorkot
- Chenab College, Bhawana
- Chenab College, Athara Hazari
- Chenab College, Ahmed Pur Sial
- Chenab College, Shah Jeewna

== Board of trustees (Jhang Educational Trust) ==
Jhang Educational Trust (JET) is the monitoring authority of all the Chenab Colleges (Jhang, Shorkot, Ahmedpur Sial and Athara Hazari) and is responsible to approve major decisions relating to all matters of the institutions. Deputy Commissioner Jhang is the ex-officio chairman of the JET.

The members of the trust are:

- Deputy Commissioner (DC), Jhang (chairman)
- Additional Deputy Commissioner (Revenue), Jhang (Director)
- Additional Deputy Commissioner (General), Jhang (Vice-Chairman)
- Assistant commissioner (AC), Jhang (secretary)
- Justice Manzoor Hussain Sial, former justice of Supreme Court of Pakistan (member)
- Sahibzada Sultan Hameed, former federal secretary, labour and manpower (member)
- Additional deputy commissioner (finance & planning)
- Assistant commissioner, Ahmed Pur Sial (member)
- Assistant commissioner, Shorkot (member)
- Assistant commissioner, Athara Hazari (member)
- CEO, District Education Authority, Jhang (member)
- Deputy director (colleges), Jhang (member)
- Principal, Government Post Graduate College, Jhang (member)
