= Shorkot =

City in Punjab, Pakistan

Shorkot شورکوٹ
- City
- Location within Pakistan
- Coordinates: 30°30′N 72°24′E
- Country: Pakistan
- Province: Punjab
- District: Jhang
- Tehsil: Shorkot
- Elevation: 131 m (430 ft)

Population (2023)
  - City: 47,248
  - Metro: 604,763 (Shorkot tehsil)
- Time zone: UTC+5 (PST)
- Postal code: 35050
- Calling code: 047

Shorkot (Urdu: شورکوٹ; Punjabi: شورکوٹ) is a city in Punjab, Pakistan. Located east of the Chenab River, it serves as the headquarters of Shorkot Tehsil in Jhang District. This city is also known for being the birthplace of Peer Muhammad Sultan Bahu A mystic Punjabi poet known for writing the Kalaam Bahu

== Population ==
Census	Population
1972	9,543
1981	18,533
1998	27,276
2017	43,019
2023	47,248

== Notable people ==
- Muhammad Arif Khan Rajbana Sial
- Sahibzada Nazir Sultan
- Sahibzada Ameer Sultan

== See also ==
- Chiniot
- Bhera
