= Jhang District =

District of Punjab, Pakistan

Jhang District ضلع جھنگ
- District of Punjab
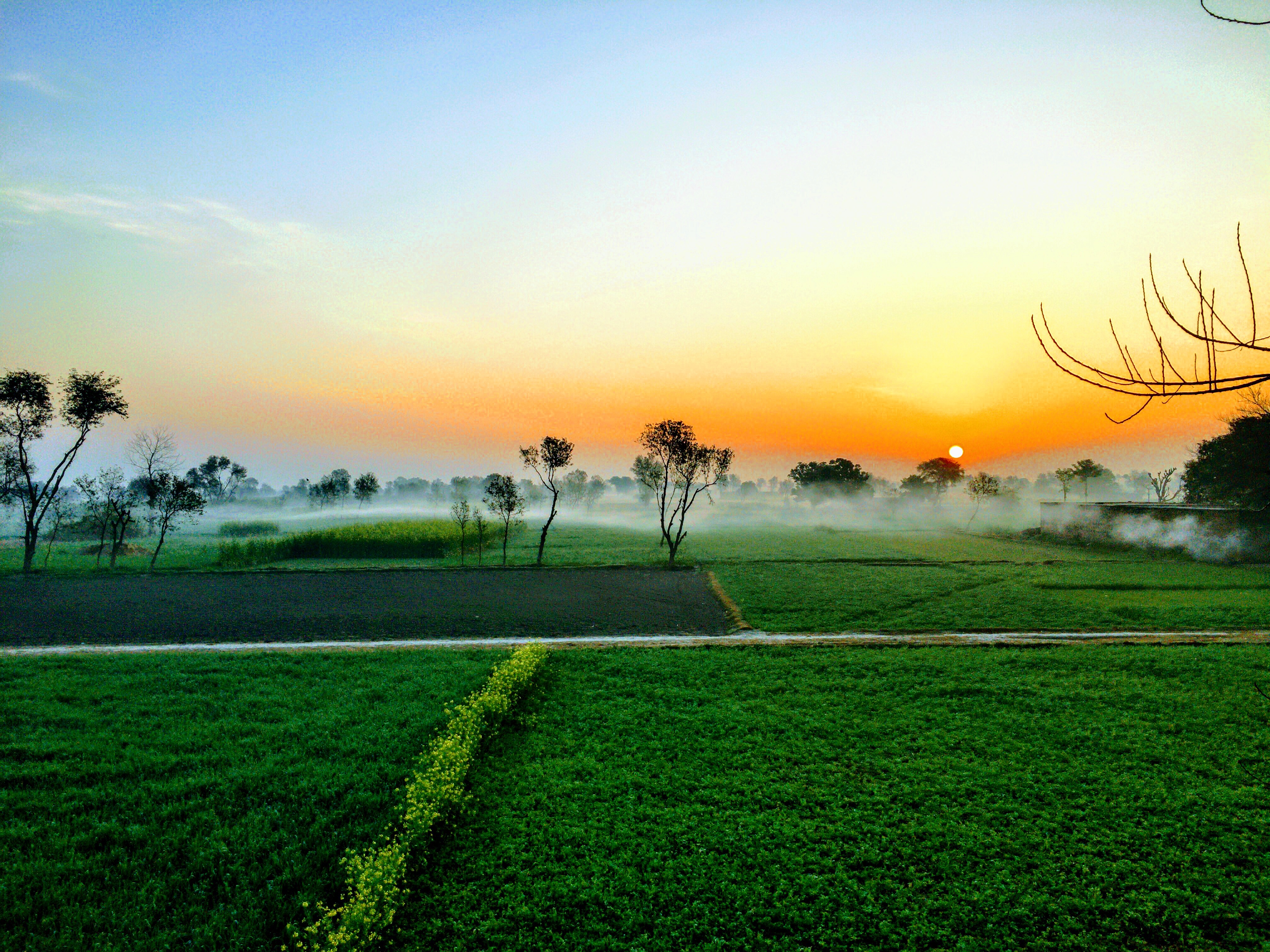
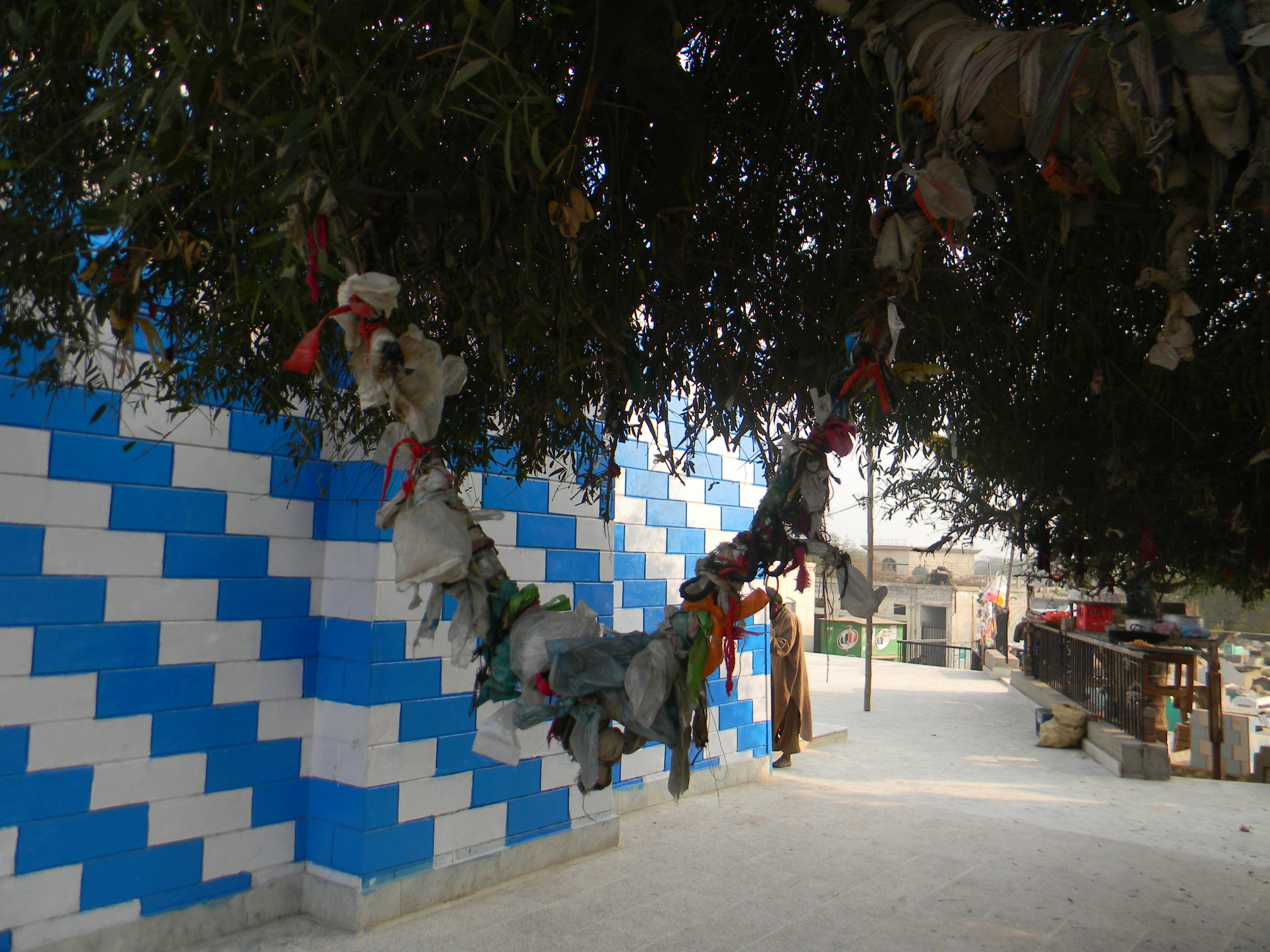
- Top: Sunrise over the countryside Bottom: Charms near the tomb of Heer Ranjha

- Flag Seal

- Map of Jhang District
- Coordinates: 30°35′N 71°39′E
- Country: Pakistan
- Province: Punjab
- Division: Faisalabad
- Established: 1849
- Headquarters: Jhang

Government
  - Type: District Administration
  - Deputy Commissioner: (Cap)R Samiullah Farooq
  - District Police Officer: N/A
  - District Health Officer: N/A

Area
  - District of Punjab: 6,166 km^{2} (2,381 sq mi)

Population (2023)
  - District of Punjab: 3,077,720
  - Density: 499.1/km^{2} (1,293/sq mi)
  - Urban: 800,926
  - Rural: 2,264,713

Literacy
  - Literacy rate: Total: (59.45%); Male: (69.09%); Female: (49.14%)
- Time zone: UTC+5 (PKT)
- Postal Code: 35200
- Area code: 047
- Constituencies: NA-108, NA-109, NA-110
- Number of Tehsils: 5
- Languages: Punjabi (95%)
- National Assembly Seats (2024): Total (3): Rah-e-Haq (0); PTI (3)
- Punjab Assembly Seats (2024): Total (7): PMLN (1); PTI (6)
- Website: jhang.punjab.gov.pk

Jhang District (Punjabi and Urdu: ضلع جھنگ) is a district of Faisalabad division in the Punjab province, Pakistan. Jhang is the capital and administrative seat of the district.

== Geography ==
Jhang District has a triangle-like shape, with its apex at the narrow southwestern corner and its base on the northeastern side. The district is traversed by two major rivers, the Jhelum and the Chenab. The Chenab, generally flowing towards the southwest, runs right down the middle of the district, practically dividing the district into two equal parts. The Jhelum enters Jhang District to the west of the Chenab and flows almost due south until it meets the Chenab at a place called Domel. The combined river takes the name Chenab, and leaves the district just to the east of the far southwestern corner of that triangle.

The geography of the Jhang district can be divided into several regions, based on the course of its two major rivers. First is the Hithar, or lowland areas that get flooded annually by the rivers. Next, there are three distinct upland areas: the Sandal Bar, to the east of the Chenab, the Kirana Bar, between the rivers, and the Thal, which is to the west of the Jhelum. These are high plateaus which slope down to the river valleys on either side. Finally, between the Hithar lowlands and the Bar and Thal uplands, there is an intermediate zone called the Utar. Each of these zones — Hithar, Utar, and the uplands — represent a different period of geological formation, with the uplands being the oldest, and they are all of alluvial origins.

=== Uplands ===
Historically, the upland zones were mostly inhabited by pastoralists who grazed their herds on the wide plains here. They lived in temporary habitations of thatched huts and moved around frequently. Under the British Raj, most of this land was held directly by the government.

==== The Sandal Bar ====
The easternmost upland area is the Sandal Bar. In the northern parts of the district, the Sandal Bar "rises abruptly from the Utar, and the summit of the dividing ledge is from 10 to 30 feet above the plain below." This sudden rise gradually lessens further south, until eventually there is no clear distinction between the Bar and the Utar. The quality of the soil generally decreases towards the south, with Kallar plains more frequent, and the better types of grass such as dhaman also become rarer.

==== The Kirana Bar ====
The Kirana Bar, which is named after the Kirana Hills, is part of the Chaj Doab between the Chenab and Jhelum rivers. Like the Sandal Bar, the Kirana Bar is generally separated from the Utar by a distinct ridge, called the Nakka. The flora is also similar between the two regions. However, the Kirana Bar has more fertile land than the Sandal Bar, and light rain showers can leave the Kirana Bar "carpeted with grass". The soil quality deteriorates to the west of the Kirana Hills, towards the Jhelum river, and more kallar soil is found.

==== The Thal ====
Not much of the Thal is included in Jhang District, although the district boundary juts out further to include more of it south of the road connecting Jhang with Dera Ismail Khan. The Thal is an elevated plateau like the Bars but with one major difference — it is almost completely covered in sand dunes, and the underlying soil only pokes out in patches. The main colour of the soil here is a light reddish brown. Well-based agriculture is done in other parts of the Thal closer to the Indus, but due to the lack of access to water, there is little to no cultivation in the parts of the Thal included in Jhang district. For the most part, this part of the Thal is a wasteland, dominated by rolling sand hills that run parallel to each other. These are interspersed with occasional patches of good soil studded with pilu bushes, which along with some trees form just about the only greenery in sight. Grass does grow abundantly after a good rain, but good rains only happen rarely.

=== Utar ===
The Utar zone is very important from a human perspective because it contains most of the district's settlements. The characteristics of this zone vary somewhat between several different areas:

==== Utar of the Sandal Bar ====
This area varies in width from 4 to 16 miles, with the average usually being about 8 miles wide. As with the Sandal Bar and the district as a whole, the soil gradually gets worse towards the south. In general, the area closest to the river bank is the most fertile, with almost continuous areas of cultivation. There are lots of wells for irrigation, each one surrounded by a cluster of trees (most commonly kikar and shisham). Going further east, the wells become less frequent and they are interspersed by patches of wasteland. Beyond this is the area where cattle graze. Closest to the border with the Bar, the distance to water is far, and the fertility of this area varies heavily depending on rainfall. Farmers try to bring rainwater down from the Bar uplands.

Towards the southern end of the district, good grassland becomes less common, and trees become mostly absent except in some depressions where water collects when it rains. The Chenab itself widens out in the south, and the Utar becomes more narrow. Traces of river action are more common here, with more depressions and sand dunes. At the far southern end of the district is a distinct area formed by relatively recent river activity; the soil here is light and sandy, and the water table is very high and close to the surface. Areas here that are not under cultivated are covered by a dense growth of sar grass.

==== Utar of the Kirana Bar ====
For the most part, the Utar on the west side of the Chenab is the same as the Utar on the east. There is a similar band of well-based agriculture on this side. Further west, in the Shah Jiwana taluka, the landscape changes to become either partially covered by sparse sar grass or otherwise bare kallar plains.

The lowest part of the triangle between the Jhelum and the Chenab is called the Vichanh, which "may be described as a dorsal ridge, covered with efflorescent saltpetre, between the fertile low-lying alluvial lands of the two rivers." This area has exceptionally sour soil and it extends as far south as Kadirpur Bakhsha.

The Utar between the Jhelum and the Kirana Bar, in the area around Kot Isa Shah, is arguably the most fertile part of the district. Agriculture flourishes here, and there are plenty of trees for some distance away from the river. To the east, farther away from the Jhelum, is an infertile zone with lots of kallar, and then comes the Kirana Bar. No clear high ridge separates this part of the Kirana Bar from the Utar. The kallar plains of the border area are interspersed by some patches of fertile soil, such as the one around the village of Bhairo.

==== Thal-Jhelum Utar (aka the Kachhi) ====
The Utar between the Thal and the Jhelum is also called the Kachhi, which refers to "a country that is contained within some strongly marked boundary, here the Thal." The name is unrelated to the Urdu word kachcha meaning "unripe" or "unformed". The Kachhi only really exists south of the village of Sherowana — north of here, the Jhelum flows right next to the Thal. South of Sherowana, though, the Kachhi is about 9 miles wide and does not get inundated by the Jhelum's floods.

A distinct feature of the Kachhi is the absence of grass. The soil is clayey, and water does not penetrate it but instead drains off into depressions. The salts left behind prevent the growth of plants, and the surface is barren as a result. The Kachhi does, however, support a "stunted forest" of jal bushes close to the Thal, and karir closer to the river.

=== Hithar ===
==== The upper Chenab valley ====
The upper Chenab Valley, before receiving the waters of the Jhelum at the Domel, is "a broad shallow stream, with a sluggish current and a licentious course. Its deposits are sandy, but its flood is extensive, and from the loose texture of the soil on its banks, the moisture penetrates far inland." The upper Chenab is contained between two well-defined banks and it rarely spills over them except at certain known points. The width between these two banks varies significantly throughout the river's course. In areas where the banks are fairly close together, the whole area between them is reliably flooded each year. In areas where the river has eroded more of the Utar and the banks are farther apart, however, the flood patterns are less predictable. In these places, in order to ensure that the water floods fields, people set up embankments across the nalas to raise the water level. The deposits left behind by the Chenab are usually very sandy, and they usually require successive deposits of silt in order to become good for agriculture. This tendency has led to a saying, "it takes gold and gives copper." The upper Chenab has "enormous powers of erosion" but it works slowly, and its flooding is fairly regular.

==== The Jhelum valley ====
Compared to the Chenab River, the Jhelum River contains a much smaller volume of water, and it flows in a much narrower channel. Since it is a fairly narrow river, islands are uncommon. The Jhelum floods a smaller area than the Chenab, but its deposits are much richer: more mud and less sand. A deposit of Jhelum silt can yield a good rice crop in its first year, unlike the Chenab. The zone on the banks of the Jhelum is "fertile, well wooded, densely cultivated, and supports a larger population than any other portion of the district."

==== The lower Chenab valley ====
Immediately downstream from the Domel, the lower Chenab begins to flood a much larger area. Large islands (called belas or bindis) form much more frequently than they do upstream. There are many channels of the river that are dry during cold weather and fill up with water whenever the water level rises. A thick lai jangal grows along the riverbank, mixed with patches of cropland. Between this band and the boundary of the Utar zone is the alluvial plain flooded by the river each year. This area is heavily cultivated, mostly for Rabi crops — generally only higher, lighter soils are used to grow autumn crops. The soil in this zone ranges from stiff clay to sand, but usually tends to be a light loam, "easily worked and retentive of moisture."

Below Shorkot, the Utar recedes, and instead of a relatively narrow band of Hithar lowlands, there is a wide floodplain with many channels that carry floodwaters inland. There is a narrow band of rich sailab land along the riverbank. Beyond this, higher ground and patches of sandy sar-covered wasteland become common. Wells for irrigation also become more common farther away from the river.

In February or March the view of this cis-Chenab portion of the district from an old mound or eminence has a peaceful beauty peculiar to itself. A sea of yellow grass rippling in the breeze, edged on the west by a silver ribbon of river, are the features that first strike the eye. Dotted over the surface are dark clumps of trees round the wells, and here and there a few groves of date palms. Towards the river long stretches of wheat are to be seen, while nearer in the cultivation is hidden from view, or only peeps out near a well or where a piece of sailáb cultivation larger than usual is found. Beyond the river rise dark against the horizon the trees growing round villages that fringe the further bank.

— Gazetteer of the Jhang District (1883), pp. 9-10

=== Climate ===
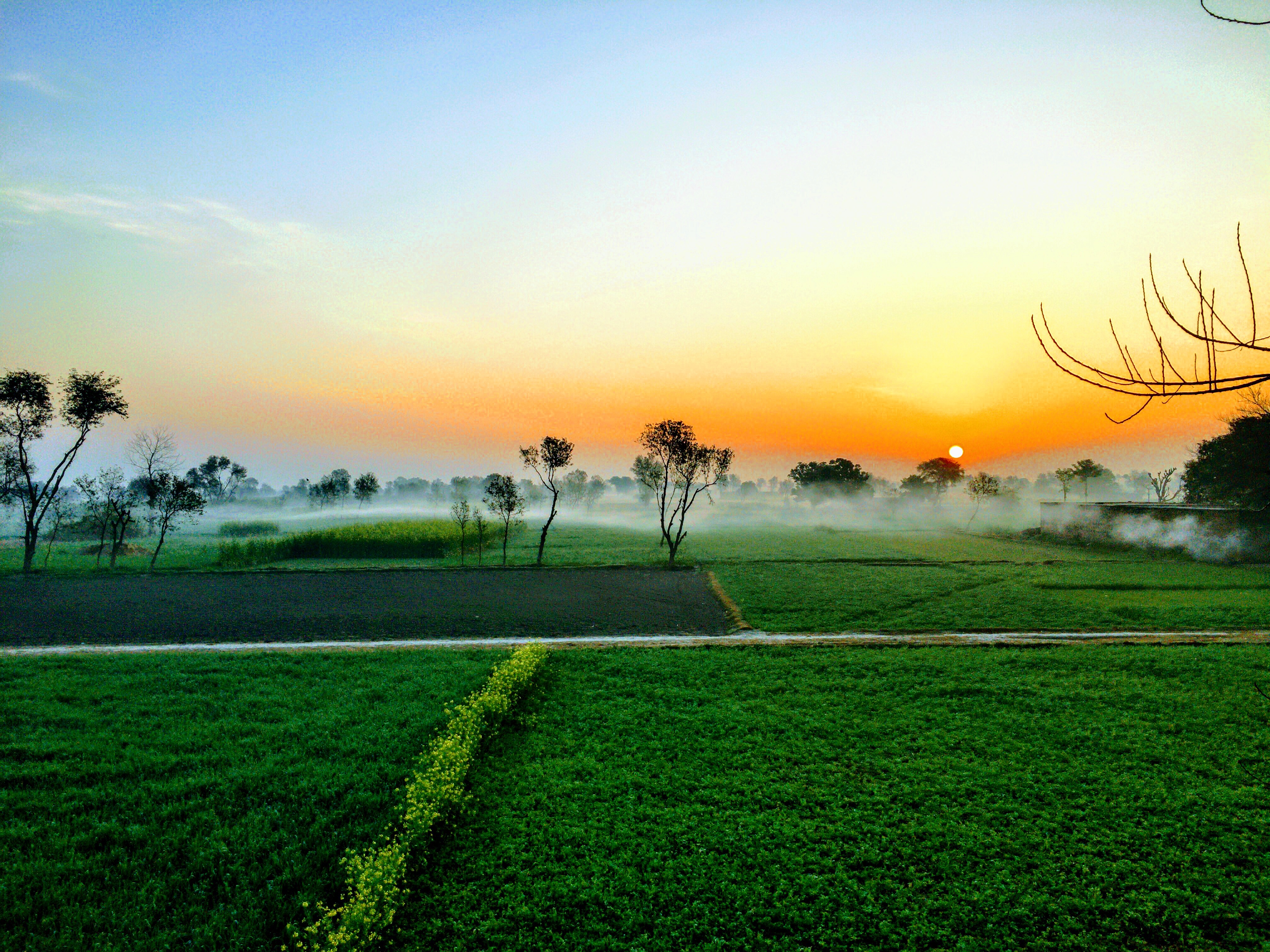
Sunrise view in a field in Jhang District, taken in 2017

The climate of Jhang District is the same as the climate for all of southern Punjab. At the start of June, the weather becomes intensely hot, and the kikar and ber trees lose all their leaves due to the heat. A hot wind blows consistently from the south and southwest throughout the month of June; the wind becomes more variable with the onset of the monsoon. Until the last few days in June, the nights are somewhat cooler than the days, and from that point on both day and night are very hot.

The monsoon rains generally start by mid-July, and then they fall constantly with few if any pauses. The rains bring a drop in temperature, and the lack of muggy weather makes Jhang District more pleasant during this period than some other areas.Jhang also holds the record for wettest monsoon ever recorded in Central Punjab.In 1908 Jhang reported a whopping 776.4mm rainfall in monsoon while its neighbouring city Faisalabad only got 429.6mm in that same year. Any pause in the rains, though, and the heat becomes intense again. The next major change usually happens in August, when the nights and mornings get cooler. When the cold weather begins depends on the amount of rainfall during August and September: if there is no rain, then the cooling happens more gradually and people stop using pankhas around early-mid October. With rain, the cold weather begins much more quickly.

Like in the rest of Punjab, cold weather in Jhang District is characterised by crisp, fresh mornings; cool, bright days; and frosty nights.However, sometimes Jhang gets exceptionally cooler due to its proximity to Thal desert with temperatures dropping below freezing. Rain generally does not fall during October and November, but it does at the end of December as well as during January and February. By the end of March, it gets noticeably warmer; April and May are both hot and dry.

=== Plants ===
==== Trees ====
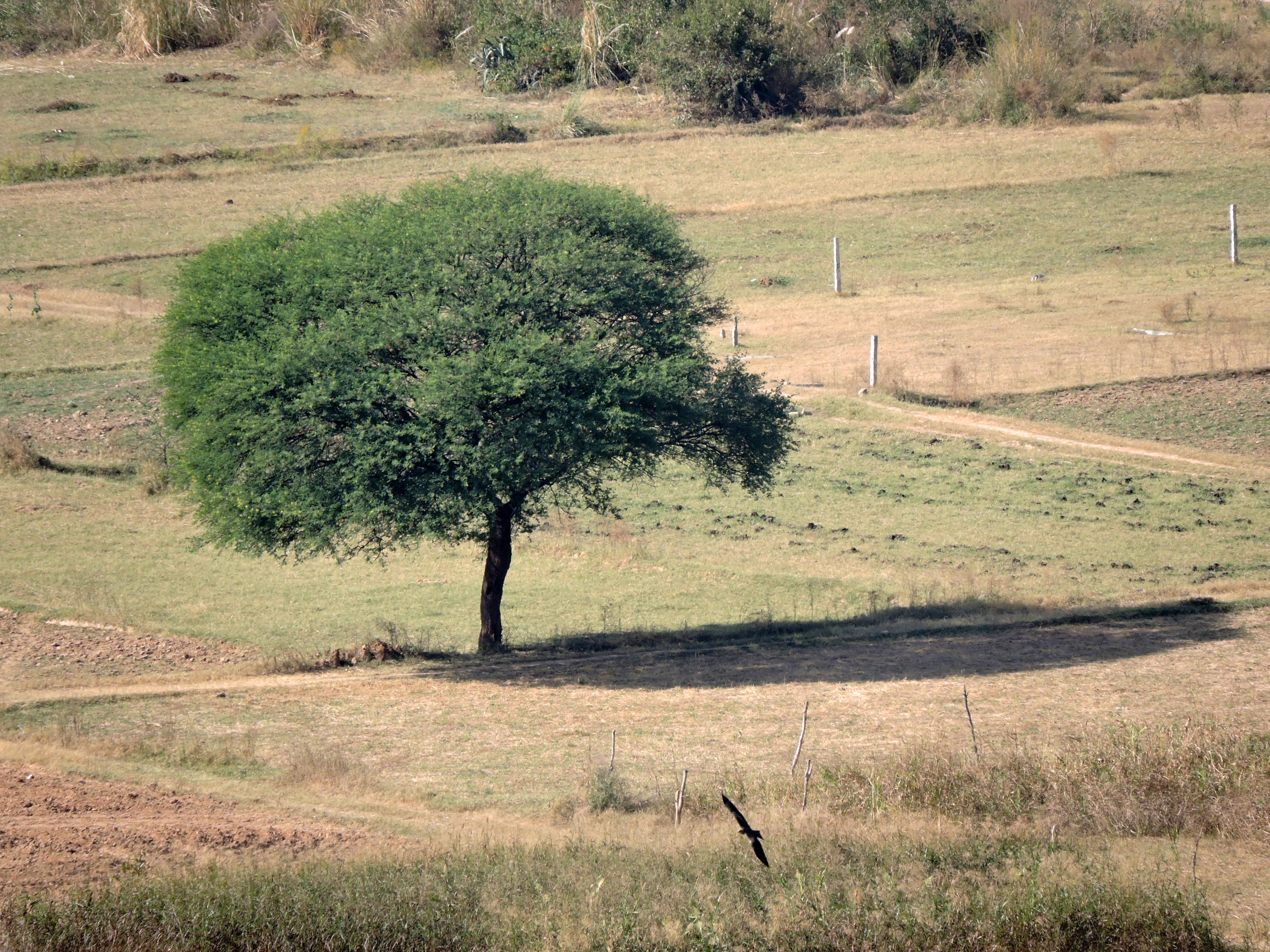
A kikar tree

The most common tree in Jhang District is the kikar (Acacia arabica), especially in the Hithar zone along the Jhelum and Chenab rivers. It grows quickly, which is the main reason why it is generally preferred as a wood tree. It is vulnerable to frost when young, but less so when mature. The tree's pods and loppings from pruning are readily eaten by sheep and goats. Kikar wood is very high quality and traditionally was used for practically every purpose, especially making wooden wheels. The bark, meanwhile, is traditionally used in tanning as well as to make spirits. The Kabuli kikar (Acacia cupressiformis) is also common in Jhang District, but it is less valued for human use.

The shisham (Dalbergia sissu), also called the tahli, is found wherever there is cultivated land, but since its roots need to get down to water for it to thrive, it is most abundant in the Hithar lowlands along the rivers. Particularly in the southern Hithar, just about every well has a bunch of shishams growing around it, and many of them can get quite big. The shisham can be found either growing straight or drooping.

The ber (Ziziphus jujuba) is a hardy tree, and it will grow just about anywhere, although it does best in the fertile soil of the Hithar. It is considered unlucky to cut down a ber, and its fruit is held in high regard. The fruit ripens around March, and it has an acidic taste.

The ukanh (Tamarix orientalis), also called the farash or the khagal, is not common except in the Bars and the Kachhi. In the Kachhi, ukanh are usually gnarled and stunted except around wells, and they are usually not chosen to be planted by people. In the Bars, the ukanh is a common sight wherever water collects or the soil is moister than usual. Its wood is hard and used for various purposes.

The jand (Acacia leucophelea) is usually encountered as a stunted bush or shrub, but in more conducive conditions it can grow into a large tree. The presence of jand shrubs is a sign of good underlying soil. Jand jangal is uncommon in the Hithar, also a dense area of it once existed near Shorkot. Like the ukanh, jands growing in the Bars generally prefer moist, low-lying areas.

The sohajna, or horseradish tree (Moringa pterygosperma), is found throughout the district, but is especially common in the Jhang tehsil. It gets pruned regularly every year, and its fruit is preserved and used in chutneys as well as to make pickles.

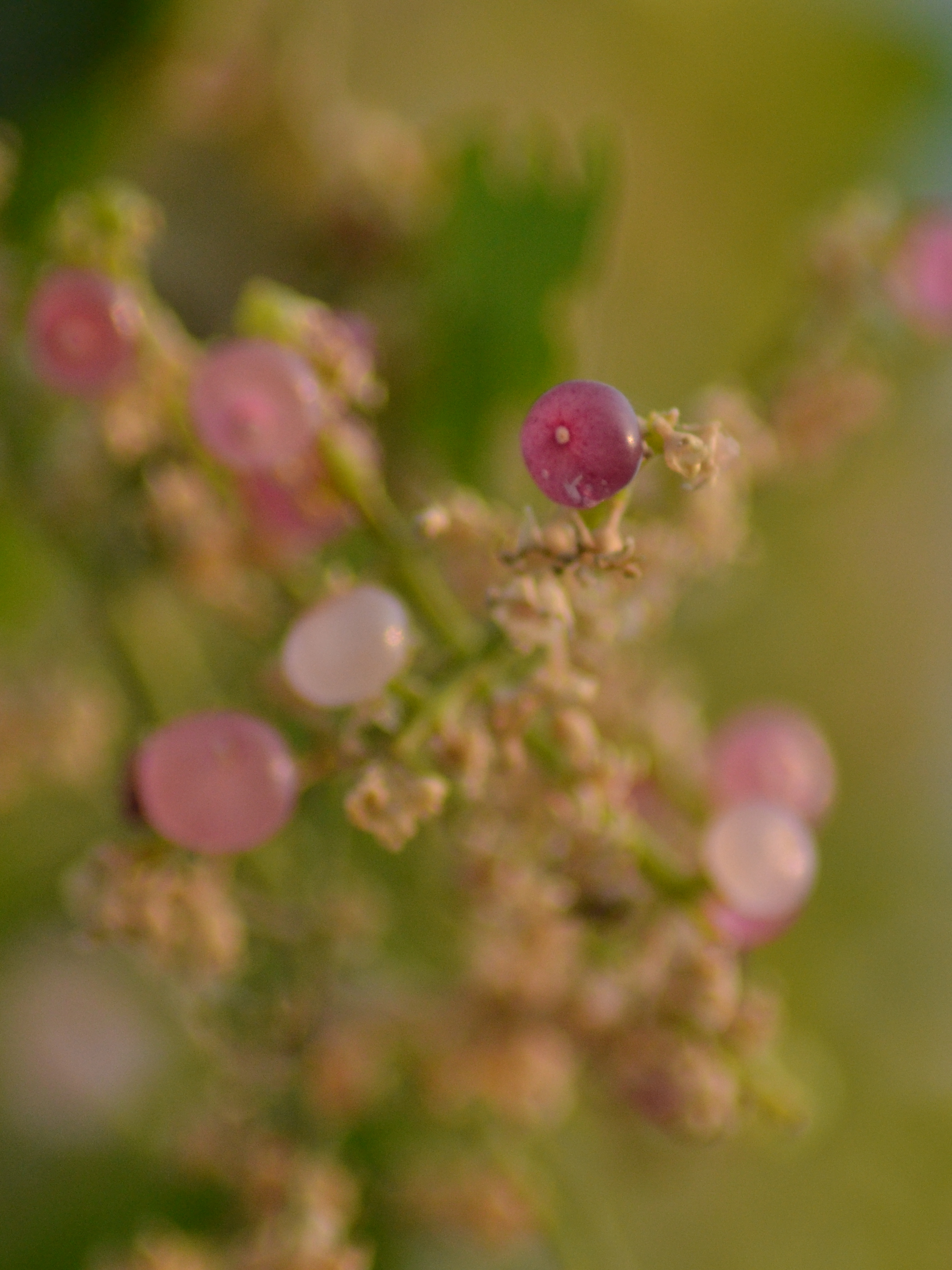
The pilu fruit

The jal (Salvadora oleoides), also called the wan or pilu, is very common throughout the district, with the largest trees generally being found in the Kachhi and the Bars. It is known by all three names, but its fruit is exclusively called pilu. There are two kinds of jal tree: the kaura jal and the miththa jal. The kaura jal's leaves are much darker, longer, and wider than the mitha jal's leaves. Cobras especially like to hide under the jal tree's roots, and camels like to eat its leaves during the first part of the hot season. The jal is well-regarded for giving good shade. Historically, cattle thieves in the Bars would frequently hide stolen animals under jal trees. The jal does not make good firewood — it produces "an enormous quantity of ash", it stinks when burned, and it doesn't give off much heat. The pilu fruit, though, is enjoyed both by people and by animals. It usually ripens around the beginning of June, and it gets gathered, dried, and stored. Livestock that eat the pilu fruit are supposed to produce sweeter milk, and more of it.

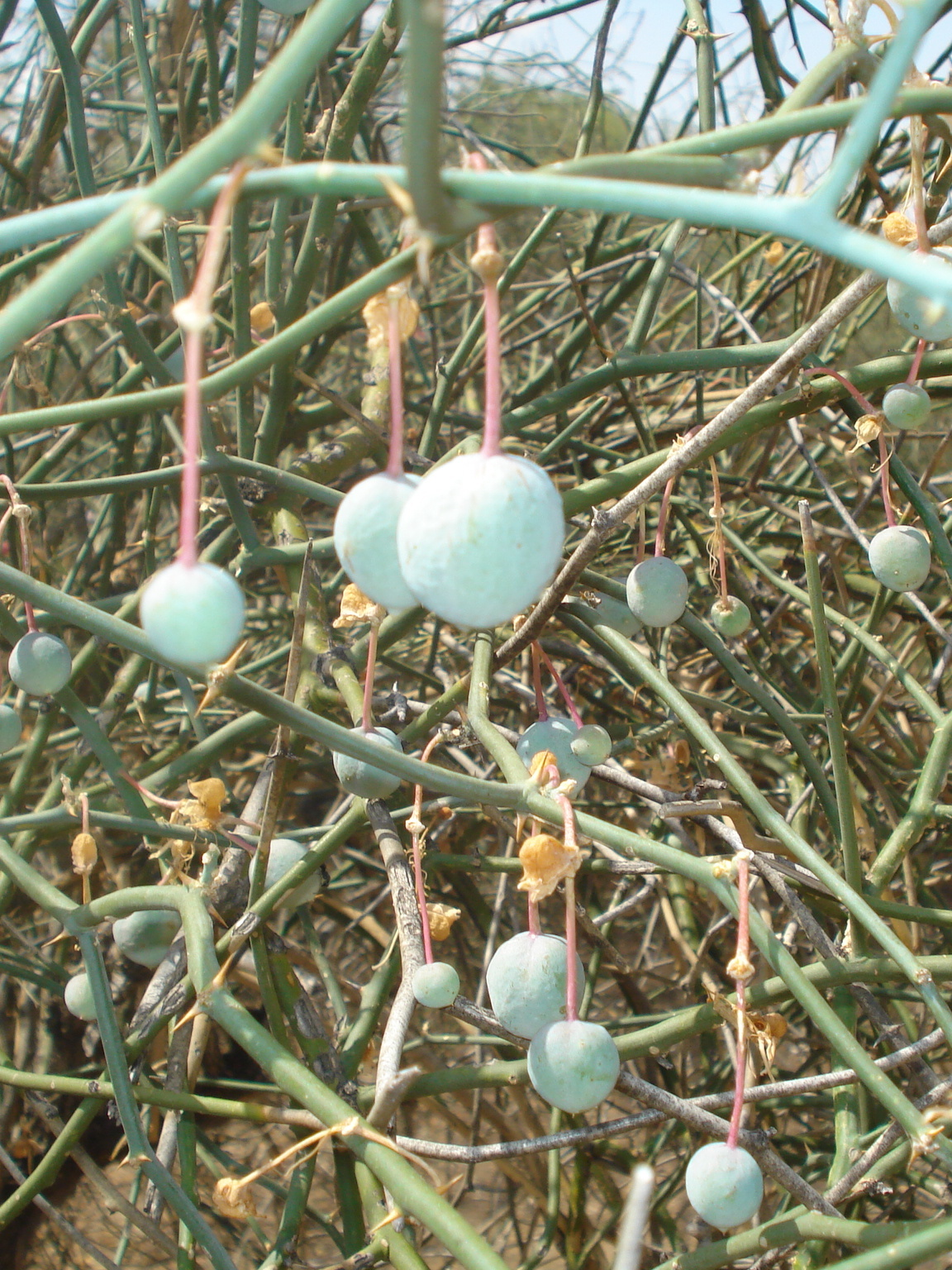
Unripe karir fruits

The karir bush (Capparis aphylla) grows alongside the jal throughout the district. Like the jal, it is especially common in the Kachhi and Bar regions. Sheep and goats readily graze off the karir, and cows will do so as well when other food is hard to come by. It has a pinkish-white flower called the bata, as well as a berry called the dehla. The dehla is eaten when ripe, but not extensively, and it is nowhere near as esteemed as ber or pilu fruit. The unripe berries are pickled or made into a tonic for horses. Karir wood is less susceptible (but not immune) to infestation by white ants than other types of wood found in the district; it gets used to make rafters for houses.

Other trees that are found in Jhang District include the siris (Acacia speciosa), which is rare but gives good shade; the bohar (Ficus indica), which is found throughout the district but especially thrives near the rivers; the pipal (Ficus religiosa), which is found throughout the district but less commonly than the bohar; the bakain (Melia azaderach); and the bahn (Populus euphratica, locally called the ubhan), which is found on some river islands, particularly just above the Domel.

==== Shrubs ====
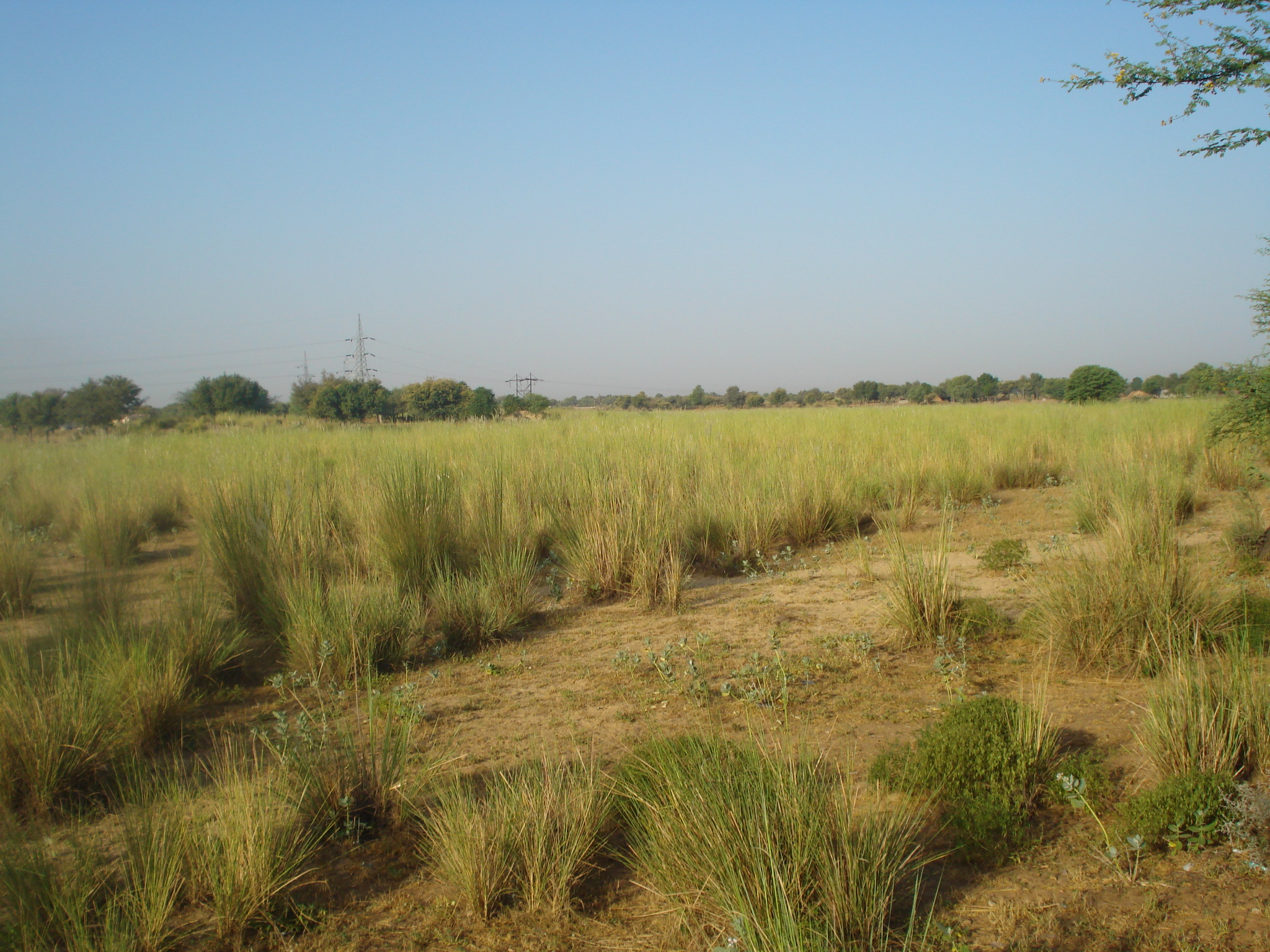
Some Tripidium bengalense plants

One of the most significant plants found in Jhang District is the buta (Tripidium bengalense, syn. Saccharum munja), which is extremely common in the Chenab valley but not so much along the Jhelum. It gets more common the further south you go. Different parts of the plant go by different names: the leaves are called sar, the flower stems are called kana and tili, and the stem sheaths are called munj. In October and November, before the kana stems are cut, they crowd one's view, and the difference after they are cut is "astonishing". During the cold season, cattle almost exclusively eat these plants. Every part of the buta plant has human uses, but the most important is the munj, which gets made into rope.

Kanh (Saccharum spontaneum) is only found in the moistest areas along the rivers. It makes the thickest jangal in the district, and it is especially liked by buffaloes for grazing as well as by wild pigs. It gets used to make pens, but not for thatching because it is too valuable.

Lana, lani, and khar are all found in Jhang District, and they are all eaten by camels. Khar is the most preferred, and lani the least. Lana comes in two varieties, called gora and mithar. Khar is used to make sajji.

Phog is mostly found in the Thal and in sandy parts of the Bars. It is rarely eaten by cattle, and it has no human use. Buin and khip are similarly useless to humans, and animals do not eat them. Ak is sometimes eaten by goats and deer if they get desperate, and it is also not useful to humans. Jawanh, or the camelthorn, is mostly found in the waste and fallow lands that get flooded by the rivers; it is a weed that causes problems for agriculture. The leh, or thistle, is another weed that grows in old sailab lands. Two more problematic weeds are the harmal and the bhukil, which are found throughout the Kachhi areas under well-based agriculture. The harmal mostly grows on fallow lands, while the bhukil grows in light sandy soil alongside crops, and it "chokes" the crops and kills them.

==== Grasses ====
Grasses are important in Jhang District because they form pasturage for livestock. The most common grass in the district is the chhimbar, which thrives in all types of soil. It grows densely, and with good rainfall it can get very tall. Lamb is a feathery grass that grows in kallar. Lunak also grows in kallar; it is tall and high quality and requires a good deal of rain to thrive. Garham somewhat resembles lunak in appearance, but is taller and stronger. It does not grow in kallar soil, but instead usually grows under bushes that have been fertilised by dung. It is not as good as lunak. Kurya is an uncommon grass, but it is high quality and makes especially good grazing for horses. Khar madhuna is a smaller grass, inferior in quality. Its seeds are shaped like a woodlouse.

The best grass of all is dhaman, which grows more in the north and less in the south. It will not grow on kallar soil. It is "a thick, juicy, pale green grass" that gets very tall with enough rain. It supposedly makes buffalo milk slightly intoxicating if they graze on it. Another good grass is pilan, which makes sweet hay and grows mixed with chhimbar and kheo. Kheo sprouts exceptionally quickly after rains; it is higher quality than murak, which also has this trait. Aleti, dedhak, and kilanj are three prostrate grasses that grow in Jhang District; all three of them are very hardy and do well during droughts. Sheep and goats eat them on the ground, while people dig them up and feed them to cattle.

Khawi grass grows in hollows where water collects, and tends to favour kallar soil. It has a fragrant smell and is coloured dark brownish-red. Cows will eat it, but only when desperate, because it is not very nutritious. Khawi grass is used to make khas-khas. Like khawi, panhi grass grows in hollows and depressions, but it sticks to better soils and does not grow in kallar. It somewhat resembles the buta in shape, although it is straight and stiff instead of drooping like the buta. Its roots are long and tough, and they are used to make rope as well as to make weavers' brushes.

=== Animals ===
Wolves are found in both the Sandal Bar and the Kirana Bar, and historically they were fairly common. Hyenas live here but have never been common. Two types of wild cats live in the district, and both of them are called the bar-billa. One type is distinguished by its long tail and is actually descended from domesticated cats that became feral. It grows larger than domesticated cats, and can run especially fast. The other type, distringuished by its short tail, is a true lynx. Jackals historically were found along the Chenab "in great numbers", but not so much in the Bars. Two different kinds of foxes also live in the district: one is a light yellowish-brown colour, and it blends in with the ground after a drought; the other one is darker in colour. Wild pigs and hares also live in Jhang District.

Birds found in the district include the houbara, which is called the obara here and is especially common throughout the district during the colder months; the coulon, or kunj, which comes here during the cold season and is most common in Hithar areas; and geese, which migrate here later than the coulon and are most common along the banks of the Jhelum and the lower Chenab. The sandgrouse is common throughout the district in November and December, and the quail is common in spring and autumn.

The most common snakes in the district include the karet and the cobra. The Bars especially are home to a large variety, including many venomous ones.

== Administrative divisions ==
This district comprises four sub-districts (or Tehsils):

Tehsil	Area (km^{2})	Pop. (2023)	Density (ppl/km^{2}) (2023)	Literacy rate (2023)	Union Councils
Shorkot	1,158	604,763	522.25	58.12%	...
Jhang	2,591	1,640,676	633.22	60.96%	...
Ahmadpur Sial	851	487,905	573.33	56.87%	...
Athara Hazari	1,566	332,295	212.19	58.05%	...
Mandi Shah Jeewna	...	...	...	...	...

== History ==
The early history of Jhang District is unclear. It is heavily intertwined with the historically dominant Sial tribe, who founded the city of Jhang in 1462. But they were not particularly powerful until the first half of the 18th century — they were originally just one of several pastoral tribes living in the area, and they were tributaries of the more powerful Nauls. Babur does not mention the Sials at all in the early-16th-century Baburnama, although he does refer to the regions of Bhera, Khushab, Chiniot, Chenab, and (possibly) Shorkot. Gradually, however, the Sials gained preeminence over the other tribes and came to collect tribute from them.

Various independent branches of the Sials existed up until the reign of Walidad Khan in the early 18th century (the exact date is not clear). Walidad Khan inherited rulership of the branch based at Jhang's fort, but he only ruled a small area at first. Other branches of the Sials at the time were based at Rashidpur, across the Chenab and close relatives (and allies) of Walidad Khan; at Massan in the Vichanh, whose ruler belonged to the Sahibana branch; and at Mirak Sial to the south, whose ruler was part of the Nithrana branch. Other independent rulers included the Mahnis of Khiwa, the Sayyids of Shah Jiwana, the Rihans of Kalowal, and the Kharals of Kamalia.

Walidad Khan was a successful ruler who ended up ruling over a large kingdom with Jhang as his capital. He died in 1747 and was succeeded as ruler by Inayatullah Khan, who was his nephew and son-in-law. Inayatullah Khan was also skilled as an administrator and military leader, but the ascendant Sikh Confederacy was beginning to impose its authority over this region. In 1760, Hari Singh of the Bhangi Misl sacked Jhang and made Inayatullah into his tributary; Inayatullah suspended paying tribute in 1778 and captured Chiniot from the Bhangis, but it had apparently come back under their control by the time he died in 1787.

Ranjit Singh, founder of the Sikh Empire, captured Chiniot from the Bhangis in 1803 and intended to attack Jhang, but the reigning Sial leader Ahmad Khan agreed to become his tributary before he did so. He paid an annual tribute of 70,000 rupees and one mare for a couple of years before Ranjit Singh invaded again. Ahmad Khan offered to pay him nazarana, but Ranjit Singh refused and went on to capture Jhang. Ahmad Khan fled to Multan, where he found refuge with the Nawab, Muzaffar Khan. Meanwhile, Ranjit Singh parcelled out the tax farming rights for the conquered Sial territory among his followers: the Vichanh area was given jointly to Dyal Singh and Fateh Singh Lamah, while the rest went to Fateh Singh Kalianwala.

Ahmad Khan and Fateh Singh Kalianwala reached an agreement in 1808; Ahmad Khan was reinstated as ruler of his former lands (at least the part that Fateh Singh held) in return for an annual payment of Rs. 70,000. Ahmad Khan then drove out the Sikh governors of the Vichanh. However, this arrangement did not last for long: after accompanying Ranjit Singh on an unsuccessful expedition against Multan in 1810, Ahmad Khan was imprisoned and taken to Lahore because Ranjit Singh suspected him of favouring the Nawab of Multan. Lala Sujan Rai was then appointed governor of Jhang. Ahmad Khan was later released and given a jagir of Rs. 1,200 at Mirowal near Amritsar; he later died in 1820.

The British annexed the Punjab in 1849 at the end of the Second Anglo-Sikh War, and at that point Jhang was constituted as one of the districts of Punjab. Jhang district was annexed by the British from its former Sikh rulers after the Second Anglo-Sikh War of 1848–1849. It was divided into the following tehsils and talukas:

Tehsils and talukas in Jhang District, c. 1800s
Tehsil	Taluka
Chiniot Tehsil	Sipra; Chiniot; Kurk; Bhowana; Kalowal; Ahmadnagar; Lalian
Jhang Tehsil	Wara, Jhang; Jhang; Gilmala; Shorkot
Kadirpur Tehsil	Mari; Kot Shakir; Kot Isa Shah; Kadirpur; Bharmi Wara; Shah Jiwana; Bhattian
Peshkari of Uch	Chauntra; Uch; Nekokara

In 1854, the Faruka taluka in the Chaj Doab was transferred out of Jhang District and into Shahpur District, and at about the same time a long strip of land on the right bank of the Ravi River was transferred out of Jhang District and into Multan District. In 1861, the ilakas of Garh Maharaja and Ahmadpur were transferred from Muzaffargarh District into Jhang District, and the ilaka of Kalowal was transferred from Shahpur District into Jhang District. At around the same time, Jhang District was redivided into three tehsils: Jhang, Chiniot, and Shorkot. Then in 1880, five villages were transferred out of Shorkot Tehsil in Jhang District and placed in the Sarai Siddhu of Multan District, so as to give Multan District control of the entire Ravi sailab.

== Demographics ==
=== Population ===
Historical population
Year	Pop.	±% p.a.
1951	534,046	—
1961	668,540	+2.27%
1972	983,818	+3.57%
1981	1,276,864	+2.94%
1998	1,869,421	+2.27%
2017	2,742,633	+2.04%
2023	3,077,720	+1.94%

As of the 2023 census, Jhang district has 491,999 households and a population of 3,065,639. The district has a sex ratio of 107.15 males to 100 females and a literacy rate of 59.45%: 69.09% for males and 49.14% for females. 837,169 (27.31% of the surveyed population) are under 10 years of age. 800,926 (26.13%) live in urban areas.

=== Religion ===
As per the 2023 census, Muslims made up almost the entire population with 99.55%.

Religion in contemporary Jhang District
Religious group	1941		2017		2023	
Religious group	Pop.	%	Pop.	%	Pop.	%
Islam	401,991	79.85%	2,734,493	99.7%	3,051,903	99.55%
Hinduism (Note: 1931-1941: Including Ad-Dharmis)	90,670	18.01%	195	0.01%	73	0%
Sikhism	10,050	2%	—N/a	—N/a	39	0%
Christianity	721	0.14%	4,900	0.18%	12,091	0.39%
Ahmadi	—N/a	—N/a	1,623	0.06%	1,313	0.04%
Others	16	0%	1,422	0.05%	220	0.01%
Total Population	503,448	100%	2,742,633	100%	3,065,639	100%
Note: 1941 census data is for Jhang and Shorkot tehsils of Jhang district, which roughly corresponds to contemporary Jhang district. District and tehsil borders have changed since 1941.

Religious groups in Jhang District (British Punjab province era)
Religious group	1881		1891		1901		1911		1921		1931		1941	
Religious group	Pop.	%	Pop.	%	Pop.	%	Pop.	%	Pop.	%	Pop.	%	Pop.	%
Islam	326,910	82.7%	344,433	78.85%	295,481	78.03%	422,468	81.95%	475,388	83.32%	552,853	83.16%	678,736	82.61%
Hinduism	64,892	16.42%	88,430	20.24%	79,650	21.03%	73,426	14.24%	85,339	14.96%	102,990	15.49%	129,889	15.81%
Sikhism	3,477	0.88%	3,941	0.9%	3,526	0.93%	19,427	3.77%	9,376	1.64%	8,476	1.27%	12,238	1.49%
Christianity	11	0%	37	0.01%	38	0.01%	201	0.04%	449	0.08%	494	0.07%	763	0.09%
Jainism	4	0%	0	0%	0	0%	4	0%	7	0%	0	0%	5	0%
Zoroastrianism	2	0%	0	0%	0	0%	0	0%	0	0%	20	0%	0	0%
Buddhism	0	0%	0	0%	0	0%	0	0%	0	0%	0	0%	0	0%
Judaism	—N/a	—N/a	0	0%	0	0%	0	0%	0	0%	0	0%	0	0%
Others	0	0%	0	0%	0	0%	0	0%	0	0%	0	0%	0	0%
Total population	395,296	100%	436,841	100%	378,695	100%	515,526	100%	570,559	100%	664,833	100%	821,631	100%
Note: British Punjab province era district borders are not an exact match in the present-day due to various bifurcations to district borders — which since created new districts — throughout the historic Punjab Province region during the post-independence era that have taken into account population increases.

Religion in the Tehsils of Jhang District (1921)
Tehsil	Islam		Hinduism		Sikhism		Christianity		Jainism		Others (Note: Including Buddhism, Zoroastrianism, Judaism, Tribals, others, or not stated)		Total	
Tehsil	Pop.	%	Pop.	%	Pop.	%	Pop.	%	Pop.	%	Pop.	%	Pop.	%
Jhang Tehsil	186,793	80.32%	41,018	17.64%	4,727	2.03%	25	0.01%	7	0%	0	0%	232,570	100%
Chinot Tehsil	186,462	88.29%	22,506	10.66%	2,131	1.01%	89	0.04%	0	0%	0	0%	211,188	100%
Shorkot Tehsil	102,133	80.55%	21,815	17.2%	2,518	1.99%	335	0.26%	0	0%	0	0%	126,801	100%
Note: British Punjab province era tehsil borders are not an exact match in the present-day due to various bifurcations to tehsil borders — which since created new tehsils — throughout the historic Punjab Province region during the post-independence era that have taken into account population increases.

Religion in the Tehsils of Jhang District (1941)
Tehsil	Islam		Hinduism		Sikhism		Christianity		Jainism		Others (Note: Including Anglo-Indian Christians, British Christians, Buddhism, Zoroastrianism, Judaism, Tribals, others, or not stated)		Total	
Tehsil	Pop.	%	Pop.	%	Pop.	%	Pop.	%	Pop.	%	Pop.	%	Pop.	%
Jhang Tehsil	259,320	79.8%	57,968	17.84%	7,564	2.33%	81	0.02%	5	0%	7	0%	324,945	100%
Chinot Tehsil	276,745	86.98%	39,219	12.33%	2,188	0.69%	23	0.01%	0	0%	8	0%	318,183	100%
Shorkot Tehsil	142,671	79.93%	32,702	18.32%	2,486	1.39%	640	0.36%	0	0%	4	0%	178,503	100%
Note1: British Punjab province era tehsil borders are not an exact match in the present-day due to various bifurcations to tehsil borders — which since created new tehsils — throughout the historic Punjab Province region during the post-independence era that have taken into account population increases. Note2: Tehsil religious breakdown figures for Christianity only includes local Christians, labeled as "Indian Christians" on census. Does not include Anglo-Indian Christians or British Christians, who were classified under "Other" category.

=== Language ===
Languages of Jhang district (2023)
1. Punjabi (93.3%)
2. Urdu (4.71%)
3. Others (1.96%)

At the time of the 2023 census, 93.33% of the population spoke Punjabi and 4.71% Urdu as their first language.

=== Historical settlement patterns ===
From the Census Report of 1881: the average size of a village was 474 people, the average distance between villages was 2.98 miles, and the average number of villages per 100 square miles was 13. The overall population density per square mile was just 69 people (63 in rural areas excluding cities), but this statistic was "in a manner misleading", since it counted large areas of arid steppe with very low populations of nomadic pastoralists. The area that was under cultivation, on the other hand, was actually fairly dense, with 557 people per square mile in rural areas (615 per square mile if urban areas are included). The average number of families per house was 1.22 in villages and 1.94 in towns; the average number of people per house was 5.74 in villages and 8.05 in towns; and the average number of people per family was 4.71 in villages and 4.14 in towns.

Historically, most villages in Jhang district were very dispersed. Instead of having a single village site, landlords and their tenants would have houses around individual wells in small hamlets, along with a shopkeeper and a few Kamins (craftsmen, service providers, and other specialists).

== Educational institutes ==
Following are some of the notable educational institutes of the district:

- Chenab College, Jhang
- Punjab College of Science, Jhang Campus

== Notable people ==
- Sultan Bahoo, a Sufi saint
- Ram Kishan, 4th Chief Minister of East Punjab
- Abdus Salam, Nobel Prize winner in physics
- Muhammad Arif Khan Rajbana Sial, politician, close associate of the Quaid-e-Azam and key figure in the Independence Movement of Pakistan
- Aleem Dar, cricket player
- Muhammad Tahir-ul-Qadri, a Sufi Scholar, Politician, Founder of Minhaj-Ul-Quran International and Pakistan Awami Tehreek
- Majeed Amjad, a famous Urdu Poet
- Syed Fakhar Ali Shah, baseball manager and former president of

Pakistan Federation Baseball

== Bibliography ==
- 1998 District Census report of Jhang. Census publication. Vol. 114. Islamabad: Population Census Organization, Statistics Division, Government of Pakistan. 2000. Archived from the original on 20 December 2016.
- Wagha, Muhammad Ahsan (1997). The development of Siraiki language in Pakistan (Ph.D.). School of Oriental and African Studies. Archived from the original on 14 February 2017.
- Maloomat e Jhang Complete Book
