= Fatyana =

Pakistani social group

The Fatyana or Fatiana (Punjabi: فتیاݨہ; Urdu: فتیانہ) are a sub-clan of the Sial tribe, mainly settled in the Sahiwal and Toba Tek Singh districts. Fatyanas were one of the clans which rose against the British during the Revolt of 1857; Murad Fatyana, a close companion of Ahmad Khan Kharral avenged his death by killing the British commissioner of Gogera.

== Notable people with the surname ==
- Murad Fatyana, Prominent freedom fighter during the Indian Rebellion of 1857
- Riaz Fatyana
- Ehsan Riaz Fatyana
- Ashifa Riaz Fatyana

== See also ==
- Bharwana
- Sargana
- Hiraj
