= List of people from Jhang =

This is a list of notable people from Jhang.

== Cricketers ==
- Aleem Dar, cricketer and world class cricket umpire who was declared as best umpire of cricket of the year for three consecutive years
- Mariam Hasan, cricketer
- Ghulam Shabber, cricketer

== Politicians and bureaucrats ==
- Khan Muhammad Arif Khan Rajbana Sial, politician and key figure in Pakistan Movement.
- Abida Hussain, politician and ambassador
- Sahibzada Muhammad Mehboob Sultan, member of National Assembly
- Javid Husain, former ambassador/diplomat
- Faisal Saleh Hayat, politician
- Ghulam Bibi Bharwana, politician
- Saima Akhtar Bharwana, politician
- Sheikh Waqas Akram, politician
- Sheikh Muhammad Akram, politician and businessman

== Scholars and Sufi ==
- Shah Jeewna, Muslim Sufi and saint
- Sultan Bahu, Muslim Sufi and saint
- Tahir-ul-Qadri, Muslim Sufi Scholar, Minhaj-ul-Quran

== Scientists, doctors & Bankers ==
- Abdus Salam, theoretical physicist, Nobel laureate, 1979
- Irshad Hussain chemist and nanomaterials scientist

== Writers and poets ==
- Majeed Amjad, Urdu language poet
- Mohsin Mighiana, writer and columnist
