= Murad Fatyana =

19th-century Punjabi Muslim Freedom fighter

- Ghazi; Mehar; Sardar
- Born: Garh Fatyana
- Died: 1869
- House: Fatyana
- Dynasty: Sial
- Religion: Sunni Islam

Murad Fatyana (Punjabi: مراد فتیاݨہ) was a Muslim freedom fighter and chieftain of the Fatyana sub-tribe of Sials.

== Role in the Gugera Rebellion ==
Murad Fatyana was a close associate of Ahmad Khan Kharal. He along with Ahmad Khan Kharal and Sarang Kharal managed to organise a decent force to battle the East India Company.

Approximately 10 separate detachments were dispatched to pursue Ahmad Khan Kharal. During a subsequent skirmish, British forces killed Ahmad Khan Kharal and Sarang Kharal.

After Kharal's death the Bar tribes desperately sought revenge from the East India Company. Bar tribes led by Fatyana vowed to do the exact same with Lord Berkley, and in a successful attack Fatyana killed Lord Berkeley and 50 other British-Indian troops.

The encounter is depicted in a ballad, which recounts Murad Fatiana's attack on Berkeley as follows:

Murad Fatyana says to Savi (his mare): "I have given you unprecedented service; I have given you the best to eat. Take me once to the English Berkeley. I want to smash his black baggi (horse-driven cart) into pieces." His mare replies: "In the name of Allah, mount my back and I will fly." Then Murad, son of Dalail, moved forward on his mare. The British fired at him and hit his left arm. He still moved forward and appeared like a lion. Then he said to Berkeley, "O Englishman! I shall take revenge for Ahmad Khan." He struck Berkeley with his pike, and the latter fell from his horse as a dyer loops out a skein from his cauldron. Murad says: "We have to face whatever is our fate, but you will never again hold your court in Gugera."
