= Sial (tribe) =

Tribe of Punjab

Sial Tribe
- Religions: Islam (majority); Sikh and Hindu (minority)
- Languages: Punjabi
- Country: India, Pakistan
- Region: Punjab
- Ethnicity: Punjabi

The Sial (or Siyal or Syal) is a Punjabi clan found in the Punjab region of the Indian subcontinent, split between India and Pakistan.

== Ethnographic classification ==
According to Bardic traditions, Sials descended from a certain Rai Shankar, a Parmar Rajput. Rai Shankar had three sons: Seo, Teo and Gheo, the ancestors of the Sial, Tiwana and Gheba clans, respectively. Denzil Ibbetson, an administrator of the British Raj, classified the Sial as a Rajput tribe. However, they are also classified as Jats.

Following the introduction of the Punjab Land Alienation Act in 1900, the authorities of the Raj classified the Sials who inhabited the Punjab as an "agricultural tribe", a term that was administratively synonymous with the "martial race" classification used for the purposes of determining the suitability of a person as a recruit to the British Indian Army.

== History ==
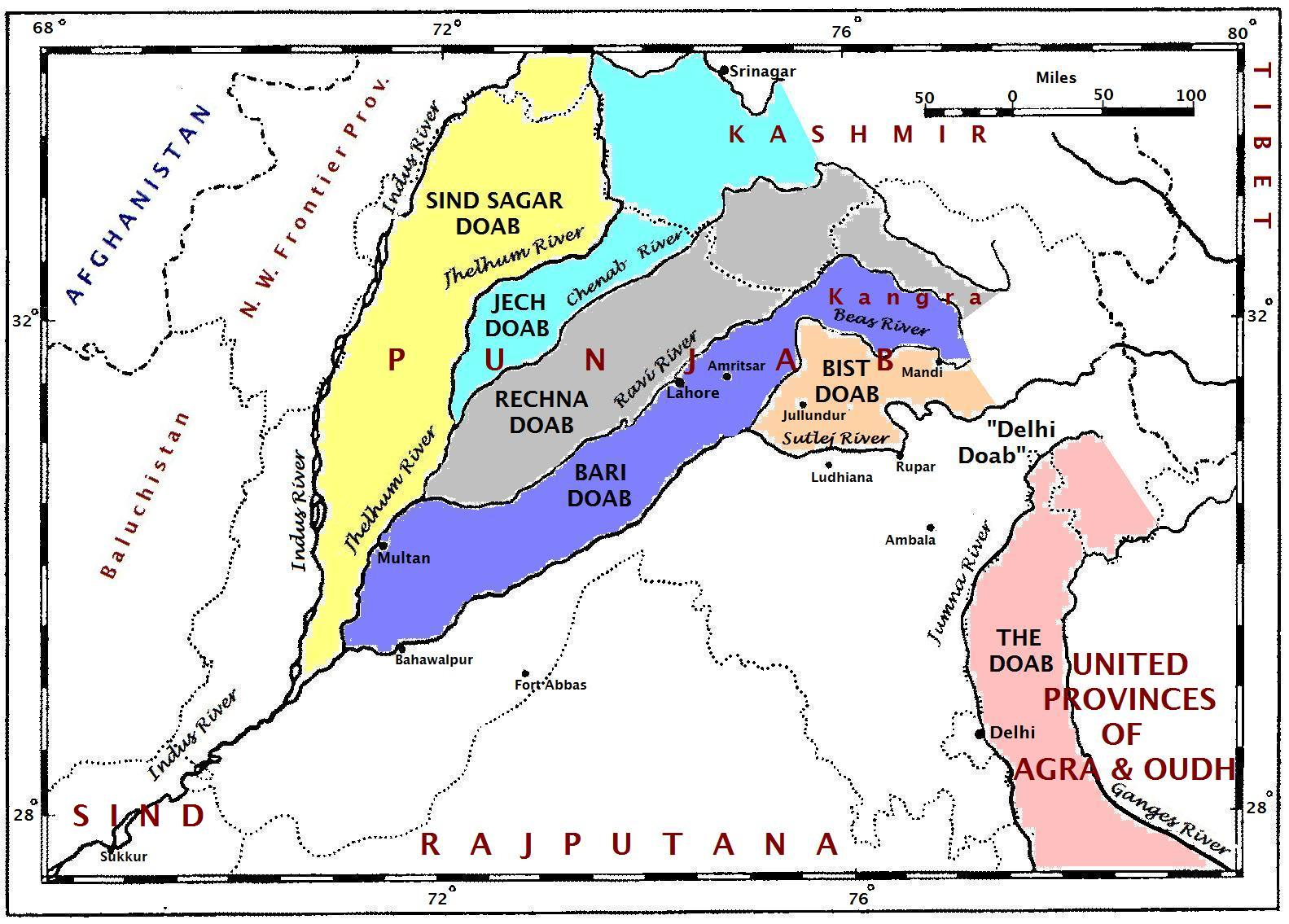
Map of doabs of Punjab

During the fifteenth- and sixteenth-century periods of the Mughal Empire, the Sial and Kharal tribes were dominant in parts of the lower Bari and Rachna doabs of Punjab. In the 18th century, Sial chief Walidad Khan gained control of Rechna Doab including the cities of Chiniot, Pindi Bhattian, Jhang and Mankera. The next chief Inayatullah Khan Sial (1747–1787) was a successful General who won 22 battles against the Bhangi Misl and Multan chiefs. In 1803, the Sial chief Ahmed Khan was forced to pay tribute to Ranjit Singh who ultimately conquered the Sial capital of Jhang in 1806. However, Ahmed Khan seized control of Jhang again in 1808 with the help of the Pathans of Multan.

The 1809 Treaty of Amritsar, agreed between Ranjit Singh, the Sikh leader, and the British, gave him a carte blanche to consolidate territorial gains north of the Sutlej River at the expense both of other Sikh chiefs and their peers among the other dominant communities. In 1816, Ahmed Khan was finally ousted, having previously been forced to pay tribute to Singh for several years. The Sials in Jhang, as in many other areas of the Punjab, had once been nomadic pastoralists. They did not necessarily cultivate all of the land they controlled and it was the actions of the Sikh Empire and, later, the land reforms of the Raj administration that caused them to turn to cultivation.

== Popular culture ==
The Heer Ranjha and Mirza Sahiban, epic poems of Punjabi literature are pieces of fictional writing which refer to the Sials, who were the dominant tribe at the time. The two heroines, Heer and Sahiban, are depicted as young and independent-minded daughters of Sial chieftains in revolt against traditional tribal conservatism.

== Clans ==
The Sial tribe has more than one hundred branches, the names of which commonly end with the suffix -ana. Some of the major clans include Bharwana, Fatiana, Sargana, Tarhana, Rajbana, Kamlana, Jangiana, Umrana, Handlana, Mukhiana, Jabboana, Daultana, Hiraj, Thiraj and Mirali. They usually use the title of Mehr except the Jangiana clan, which uses Mian.

== Notable people with this surname ==
=== Pakistani people ===
- Muhammad Arif Khan Rajbana Sial, former federal and provincial minister
- Najaf Abbas Sial (1959–2018), Member, Provincial Assembly of Punjab (2002 - 2007) from Jhang District
- Omar Sial (born 1969), Pakistani judge
- Amjad Hussain B. Sial, Pakistani diplomat
- Fateh Muhammad Sial (1887–1960), Pakistani landlord and missionary
- Ghazalla Sial, member, Provincial Assembly of Sindh (2018–2023) and (2013–2018) from Khairpur
- Ghazi Sial (1933–2019), Pakistani poet
- Khurram Abbas Sial (born 1981), Pakistani politician
- Mehr Irshad Ahmed Sial (born 1967), Pakistani politician
- Sohail Anwar Siyal (born 1975), Pakistani politician
- Swaran Lata (1924–2008), Pakistani actress
- Wahid Baksh Sial Rabbani (1910–1995), Pakistani army veteran, Islamic saint and scholar

=== Indian people ===
- Amit Sial (born 1975) Indian actor in Hindi cinema and television
- Brijender Syal (1920–2001), Indian army veteran and sculptor
- Meera Syal (born 1961), British writer and actress
- Namansh Syal (1991–2025) Indian Air Force wing commander and fighter pilot, killed in an HAL Tejas aircrash at the 2025 Dubai Airshow.
