= Chaudhry Mohammad Siddique =

Pakistani jurist

Chaudhry Mohammad Siddique was a Pakistani jurist who served on the Lahore High Court bench from 1971 to 1978. He also served as a Federal Shariat Court judge from 1981 to 1985.

== Early life and education ==
Chaudhry Mohammad Siddique was born in 1916 in Lahore. He received his L.L.B. degree from the Punjab University Law College in 1943.

== Career ==
Siddique began his legal career in Lahore in 1947. Later, he was appointed District Liaison Officer for the Ambala and Shimla districts, during which he was severely injured while assisting in the resettlement of refugees and the recovery of abducted Muslim women.

Siddique resumed his legal practice in 1949, focusing on constitutional cases, and was appointed to the Lahore High Court in 1971. He retired from the bench in 1978 and subsequently served as chairman of the Punjab Election Authority and the Appellate Tribunal Bench in 1979, and as a judge of the Federal Shariat Court from 1981 to 1985.

== Personal life ==
He had three sons: Khalil-ur-Rehman Ramday, Asad Ur Rehman, and Chaudhry Farooq who served as the Attorney General for Pakistan.
