= Bahawalnagar incident =

Alleged police misconduct in Pakistan

- Date: April 2024
- Venue: Madrassa police station, Bahawalnagar
- Location: Bahawalnagar, Punjab, Pakistan
- Cause: Alleged illegal detention of civilians by Punjab Police
- Participants: Punjab Police (Pakistan), Pakistan Army
- Outcome: Joint Investigation by Punjab Police and Pakistan Army
- Injuries: Yes

The Bahawalnagar incident took place in the city of Bahawalnagar in Pakistan, when there was a clash between the Punjab Police and the Pakistan Army, which was widely circulated on social media. The videos show people dressed in army uniforms allegedly attacking police personnel.

== Incident ==
The incident started when the Punjab Police allegedly illegally detained three citizens. In response, army personnel rescued them by raiding Madrasa police station in Bahawalnagar, which led to an attack on police personnel. Videos of the incident, which showed men in army uniforms allegedly attacking policemen, were widely circulated on social media and sparked widespread outrage from politicians.

== Response and investigation ==
In response to the incident, the Punjab Police and Pakistan Army launched a joint investigation. The police issued a statement condemning the "false propaganda" and said the matter had been exaggerated and taken out of context. The Inter-Services Public Relations (ISPR) also said that despite the matter being resolved, some elements started propaganda on social media.

=== Joint Investigation Team (JIT) ===
The Punjab government constituted a five-member Joint Investigation Team (JIT) to investigate the incident. The JIT comprises Special Home Secretary Fazlur Rehman as convener, Bahawalpur Commissioner Nadir Chatta, DIG Special Branch Faisal Raza and one member each from Inter-Services Intelligence (ISI) and Intelligence Bureau (IB).

== Reactions ==
The incident sparked a significant public response, with the Pakistan Tehreek-e-Insaf (PTI) demanding a full investigation into the incident. PTI spokesperson Raoof Hasan demanded a transparent and comprehensive inquiry and insisted that the report be made public without any alteration. The incident was also criticized by PTI leader Hamad Azhar and other politicians.
