= Sargana =

The Sargana (Punjabi: سرگاݨہ; Urdu: سرگانہ) are a sub-clan of the Sial tribe, mainly settled in the Khanewal district.

== Notable people with the surname ==
- Mehr Khalid Mahmood Sargana

== See also ==
- Bharwana
- Hiraj
