= Sheikh Muhammad Akram =

Pakistani politician

- شیخ محمد اکرم

Member of the Provincial Assembly of the Punjab
- Incumbent
- Assumed office 24 February 2024
- Constituency: PP-127 Jhang-III

Member of the National Assembly of Pakistan
- In office 1 June 2013 – 31 May 2018
- Preceded by: Sheikh Waqas Akram
- Succeeded by: Ghulam Bibi Bharwana
- Constituency: NA-89 (Jhang-I)

Personal details
- Party: PTI (2023-present)
- Other political affiliations: PMLN (2013-2018)
- Relations: Sheikh Waqas Akram (son) = Sheikh Fawad Akram (son)

Sheikh Muhammad Akram (Urdu: شیخ محمد اکرم) is a Pakistani politician who was a member of the National Assembly of Pakistan from June 2013 to May 2018. He is currently member of Punjab Assembly from the seat PP-127 Jhang-III since 24 February 2024.

== Political career ==
He was elected to the National Assembly of Pakistan as a candidate of Pakistan Muslim League (N) (PML-N) from Constituency NA-89 (Jhang-I) in the 2013 Pakistani general election. He received 75,053 votes and defeated Muhammad Ahmed Ludhianvi. In 2014, he was disqualified and unseated by an election tribunal. However, in 2016, the Supreme Court of Pakistan declared Akram as returned candidate. On 8 February 2024 Sheikh Muhammad Akram who was the candidate of Pakistan Tehreek-e-Insaf elected as PP-127 Jhang-II and defeated PML-N candidate Rashda Yaqoob and Sipah-e-Sahaba, Molana Ahmed Ludhianvi.
