= Muhammad Aurangzeb =

45th Minister of Finance (Pakistan)

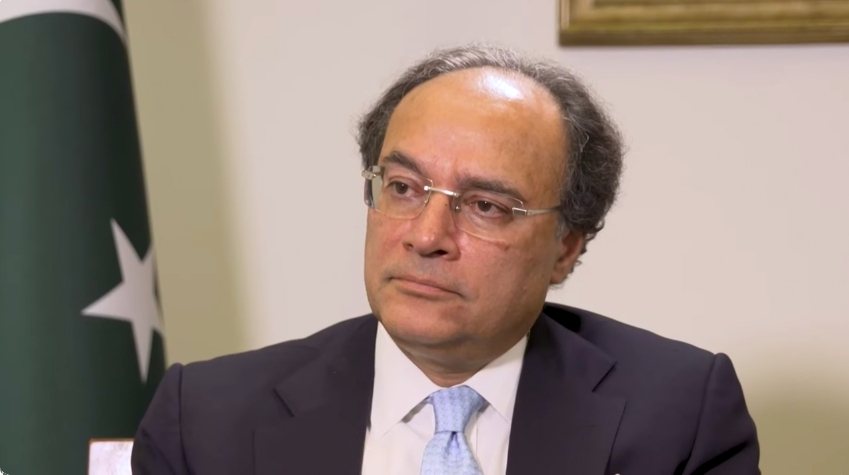

Minister of Finance
- Incumbent
- Assumed office 11 March 2024
- President: Asif Ali Zardari
- Prime Minister: Shehbaz Sharif
- Preceded by: Shamshad Akhtar

Member of the Senate of Pakistan
- Incumbent
- Assumed office 9 April 2024
- Constituency: Punjab

Personal details
- Born: June 1964 (age 62) Lahore, Punjab, Pakistan
- Party: PML(N) (since 2024)
- Relations: Khalil-ur-Rehman Ramday (uncle); Asad Ur Rehman (uncle); Chaudhry Mohammad Siddique (grandfather)
- Education: Aitchison College; Wharton School of the University of Pennsylvania
- Occupation: Banker; politician

Muhammad Aurangzeb (born 1964) is a Pakistani banker who has been serving as the finance minister of Pakistan since 11 March 2024. He previously served as the chief executive officer (CEO) and president of Habib Bank Limited from February 2018 to March 2024.

== Early life and education ==
Aurangzeb was born in June 1964 to Chaudhry Muhammad Farooq Ramday, who served twice as the Attorney-General for Pakistan.

Aurangzeb attended Aitchison College in Lahore for his early education and later went on to study at the Wharton School of the University of Pennsylvania. He graduated from the Wharton School, earning both a bachelor's degree in economics and an MBA.

== Family ==
Aurangzeb's father, Chaudhry Muhammad Farooq, served as the Attorney-General for Pakistan on two occasions: first in the caretaker government and later in the Second Nawaz Sharif ministry until Sharif was removed in the 1999 Pakistani coup d'état.

His grandfather, Chaudhry Mohammad Siddique, was a justice of the Lahore High Court. His uncle, Khalil-ur-Rehman Ramday, served as a judge of the Supreme Court of Pakistan. Another uncle, Asad Ur Rehman, served as a member of the National Assembly of Pakistan, affiliated with Pakistan Muslim League (N).

== Banking career ==
Aurangzeb began his banking career at Citibank, initially in Pakistan, and later in New York. In 2001, he joined the Dutch bank ABN AMRO in Pakistan, where he initially worked as a country manager. He later spent eight years at ABN Amro's headquarters in Amsterdam as the global head of wholesale lending and commercial client business. During his time in Amsterdam, Aurangzeb gained proficiency in the Dutch language. After leaving ABN Amro, Aurangzeb joined RBS International, where he served as the head of global banking and markets for RBS in Southeast Asia as well as country executive of Singapore until December 2010.

In 2011, Aurangzeb joined JP Morgan as the chief executive for the bank's Asia-Pacific corporate division, based in Singapore, where he served until 2018.

In February 2014, Aurangzeb received an offer to serve as the governor of the State Bank of Pakistan by the then prime minister of Pakistan, Nawaz Sharif.

In February 2018, Aurangzeb was appointed the president and CEO of Habib Bank Limited (HBL). He joined HBL shortly after the bank received a $225 million penalty from the New York State Department of Financial Services. As the president and CEO of the bank, he applied his extensive experience in leading banking and financial institutions to steer HBL towards recovery and growth. During his five-year tenure, the bank achieved significant milestones, including a profit of PKR 12 billion in its first year and a record profit of over PKR 57 billion in the latest earnings report and the bank's customer base was also expanded from 12 million in 2018 to 36 million by December 2023. Under his tenure, the bank also expanded its operations to China and he also served as the chairman of the Pakistan Banks Association and as a director of the Pakistan Business Council during the same time.

He actively supported the Charter of Business and the Charter of Economy proposed by member parties of the Pakistan Democratic Movement (PDM).

== Minister for Finance (2024–present) ==
In March 2024, it was reported that Aurangzeb was ranked among the top five highest-paid bank CEOs in Pakistan, earning an annual salary totaling PKR 352 million at Habib Bank. It was also reported that he was ready to forego his monthly salary package of PKR 30 million at Habib Bank as well Dutch nationality to take up the position of federal minister of finance in Shehbaz Sharif's second cabinet. On 11 March, he was inducted into the federal cabinet of Prime Minister Shehbaz Sharif with the status of Federal Minister. Subsequently, he resigned as HBL's president and CEO. Aurangzeb was one of the three yet-to-be-elected members appointed to Shehbaz's second-term cabinet. The other two members were Mohsin Naqvi and Ahad Cheema. As per the country's regulations, unelected cabinet members have six months to attain parliamentary status to retain their positions as federal ministers. On the same day, he renounced his Dutch citizenship and acquired Pakistani nationality. Asif Kirmani, who regarded as a close ally of Nawaz Sharif, criticized the appointment of Aurangzeb as finance minister, labeling it as an "establishment pawn." As the prime minister Shehbaz had bifurcated the Ministry of Finance, Revenue, and Economic Affairs into three divisions, the Ministry of Economic Affairs was allotted to Ahad Cheema while Aurangzeb was assigned the additional portfolio of the Revenue Division.

Aurangzeb became the third banker to assume the position of minister for finance after Shaukat Aziz (1999-2007) and Shaukat Tarin (2021-2022). In March 2024, Aurangzeb, backed by PML-N, filed his nomination papers for the 2024 Pakistani Senate election. On 2 April 2024, he was elected to the Senate of Pakistan on the technocrat seat from Punjab, receiving 128 votes.

Since sources within the PML-N indicated that there were varying opinions regarding the appointment of Aurangzeb as finance minister instead of Ishaq Dar. Ultimately, it was decided that Dar would remain involved in economic affairs, despite being appointed as the Foreign Minister. Subsequently, on 22 March, Prime Minister Shehbaz reconstituted cabinet committees, resulting in the removal of the Aurangzeb from the chairmanship of two important committees. This included the Economic Coordination Committee (ECC), which had previously been chaired by a finance minister. Additionally, Dar, despite being Foreign Minister, was appointed as the chairman of the Cabinet Committee on Privatisation (CCOP), a position formerly held by a finance minister. This restructuring indicated a reluctance to assign the ECC’s chairmanship to Aurangzeb, thereby reducing Aurangzeb's influence over economic matters. Nevertheless, the following day, Prime Minister Shehbaz decided to transfer the chairmanship of the ECC to Aurangzeb amidst criticism. However on 29 March, for the first time, the foreign minister Ishaq Dar replaced the finance minister in the Council of Common Interests.
