= Nazia Raheel =

Pakistani politician

Member of the Provincial Assembly of the Punjab
- In office 2008 – 31 May 2018
- Constituency: PP-88 (Toba Tek Singh-V)

Personal details
- Party: PMLN (2008-present)
- Other political affiliations: PMLQ (2002-2008)

Nazia Raheel (Urdu: نازیہ راحیل; born 25 January 1974) is a Pakistani politician who has been a Member of the Provincial Assembly of the Punjab, from 2008 to May 2018.

== Early life and education ==
Raheel was born on 25 January 1974 in Abbottabad.

She holds a degree of Bachelor of Arts and completed her graduation in Law and Political Science from Army Burn Hall College in 1995.

== Political career ==
She ran for a seat of the Provincial Assembly of the Punjab as a candidate for Pakistan Muslim League (Q) (PML-Q) for Constituency PP-88 (Toba Tek Singh-V) in the 2002 Pakistani general election but was unsuccessful. She received 21,623 votes and lost the seat to an independent candidate, Ashifa Riaz Fatyana.

She was elected to the Provincial Assembly of the Punjab as a candidate for Pakistan Muslim League (N) (PML-N) for Constituency PP-88 (Toba Tek Singh-V) in the 2008 Pakistani general election. She received 23,550 votes and defeated PML-Q's Ashifa Fatyana.

She was re-elected to the Provincial Assembly of the Punjab as a candidate for PML-N for Constituency PP-88 (Toba Tek Singh-V) in the 2013 Pakistani general election. She received 37,216 votes and again defeated Ashifa Fatyana, who was an independent candidate this time.

She contested the 2018 Pakistani general election as a candidate of PML-N for the constituency PP-122. She received 44739 votes and was defeated by Ashifa Riaz, a PTI candidate.

She contested the 2024 Pakistani general elections from PP-123 on a PML-N ticket. She supported an independent candidate for MNA instead of her own party’s candidate. She campaigned with Haider Ali Khan Kharal and opposed Chaudhry Asad ur Rehman, while Asad supported an independent candidate, Shahid Iqbal, who contested the elections against Nazia. She received 21,198 votes and was defeated by three other candidates, including Shahid.
