= Gheba (tribe) =

Ethnic group

Gheba (Punjabi: گھیبہ) is a Punjabi Rajput tribe native to Pindi Gheb, Talagang and Fatah Jang tehsils along Salt Range in Punjab, Pakistan.

According to the Bardic traditions, Ghebas descended from a certain Rai Shankar, a Parmar Rajput. Rai Shankar had three sons: Seo, Teo and Gheo, the ancestors of Sial, Tiwana and Gheba clans, respectively. According to J. S. Grewal Ghebas remained dominant throughout Mughal period. According to the historian H. R. Gupta the Ghebas were never conquered by the Afghans and maintained their independence against the Awan, Jodhra and Gakhar tribes, until the region was conquered by Sikh Empire in the early 19th century. Ghebas are closely related to Jodhras. Bhandial is a branch of Ghebas. The Ghebi dialect is named after the tribe.
