= Kunj-e-Qafas =

Poetry book

Kunj-e-Qafas کنجِ قفس
- Author: Fawad Hasan Fawad
- Language: Urdu
- Subject: Poetry
- Genre: Ghazal, Nazm
- Publisher: Nigarshat Publications
- Publication date: 2023
- Publication place: Pakistan
- Pages: 262

Kunj-e-Qafas is a poetry book by Fawad Hasan Fawad. Fawad's poetry in Kunj-e-Qafas reflects on his transformation from a passionate public speaker in his youth to a prisoner of conscience at the pinnacle of his public service career, who was imprisoned for his commitment to transparency and the rule of law.

His poetry represents Pakistan's change over the last five decades, beginning with romantic self-belief and progressing to a yearning for freedom of expression and thinking in today's Pakistan. His rhymes follow Urdu traditions, drawing inspiration from Mirza Ghalib, Faiz Ahmed Faiz, Ahmed Faraz, and Munir Niazi.
