= Ehsan Riaz Fatyana =

Pakistani politician

Member of the Provincial Assembly of the Punjab
- In office 29 May 2013 – 31 May 2018

Personal details
- Born: 15 December 1987 (age 38) Lahore
- Parent(s): Riaz Fatyana (father); Ashifa Riaz Fatyana (mother)

Ehsan Riaz Fatyana is a Pakistani politician who was a member of the Provincial Assembly of the Punjab, from May 2013 to May 2018.

== Early life and education ==
He was born on 15 December 1987 in Lahore to Riaz Fatyana and Ashifa Riaz Fatyana. Both his parents have been elected legislators.

He received his early education from Aitchison College.

== Political career ==
He was elected to the Provincial Assembly of the Punjab as an independent candidate from Constituency PP-58 (Faisalabad-VIII) in the 2013 Pakistani general election. He became the youngest member of the Provincial Assembly of the Punjab.

In April 2018, he joined Pakistan Tehreek-e-Insaf.
