= Sahabzada Mehboob Sultan =

Pakistani politician

Minister for States and Frontier Regions
- In office 19 November 2019 – 10 April 2022
- President: Arif Alvi
- Prime Minister: Imran Khan
- Deputy: Shehryar Khan Afridi

Minister for National Food Security and Research
- In office 5 October 2018 – 18 November 2019
- President: Arif Alvi
- Prime Minister: Imran Khan
- Succeeded by: Khusro Bakhtiar

Member of the National Assembly of Pakistan
- Incumbent
- Assumed office 29 February 2024
- Constituency: NA-108 Jhang-I
- In office 15 August 2018 – 25 January 2023
- Constituency: NA-114 (Jhang-I)
- In office 2002–2013
- Constituency: NA-91 (Jhang-VI)

Personal details
- Born: 30 September 1971 (age 55)
- Party: PTI (2018-present)
- Other political affiliations: PMLN (2013-2018); PML(Q) (2002-2008)
- Children: 1

Sahabzada Muhammad Mehboob Sultan (born 30 September 1971) is a Pakistani politician who served as the Federal Minister for National Food Security and Research, from 5 October 2018 to 18 November 2019. He has been a member of the National Assembly of Pakistan since February 2024 and previously served in this positions from August 2018 till January 2023. He was earlier a member of the National Assembly from 2002 to 2013 on PTI Ticket.

== Personal life ==
Mehboob Sultan was born on 30 September 1971 and belongs to a known political family of Pakistan. He spent most of his childhood in Lahore and studied in Aitchison College. He is a descendant of the famous Sufi mystic, poet and scholar Sultan Bahoo.

== Political career ==
Sultan was elected to the National Assembly of Pakistan from Constituency NA-91 (Jhang-VI) as a candidate of Pakistan Muslim League (Q) (PML-Q) in the 2002 Pakistani general election. He received 53,545 votes and defeated Faisal Saleh Hayat.

He was re-elected to the National Assembly from Constituency NA-91 (Jhang-VI) as a candidate of PML-Q in the 2008 Pakistani general election. He received 75,803 votes and defeated Atta Ullah Khan, a candidate Pakistan Peoples Party (PPP).

He ran for the seat of the National Assembly from Constituency NA-91 (Jhang-III) as a candidate of Pakistan Muslim League (N) (PML-N) in the 2013 Pakistani general election, but was unsuccessful. He received 87,048 votes and lost the seat to Najaf Abbas Sial.

In March 2018, he joined Pakistan Tehreek-e-Insaf (PTI).

He was re-elected to the National Assembly from Constituency NA-114 (Jhang-I) as a candidate of PTI in the 2018 Pakistani general election. He received 106,043 votes and defeated Faisal Saleh Hayat, a candidate Pakistan Peoples Party (PPP).

On 5 October 2018, Sultan was inducted into the federal cabinet of Prime Minister Imran Khan and was appointed as Federal Minister for National Food Security and Research.

He was re-elected to the National Assembly from NA-108 Jhang-I as an independent candidate supported by PTI in the 2024 Pakistani general election. He received 169,676 votes and defeated Faisal Saleh Hayat, a candidate of PML(N).

== More Reading ==
- List of members of the 15th National Assembly of Pakistan 2018-2023
