= Ashifa Riaz Fatyana =

Pakistani politician

Provincial Minister of Punjab for Women Development
- In office 13 September 2018 – 10 April 2022

Member of the Provincial Assembly of the Punjab
- In office 15 August 2018 – 14 January 2023
- Constituency: PP-122 Toba Tek Singh-V

Personal details
- Born: January 7, 1965 (age 61)
- Party: PTI (2018-present)
- Other political affiliations: Independent (2002-2018)
- Spouse: Riaz Fatyana
- Children: Ehsan Riaz Fatyana

Ashifa Riaz Fatyana (born 7 January 1965) is a Pakistani politician who has been a provincial minister from September 2018 till April 2022 and a member of the Provincial Assembly of the Punjab from August 2018 till January 2023.

== Early life and education ==
She was born on 7 January 1965.

She graduated from the University of the Punjab in 1990 from where she received the degree of Bachelor of Arts.

== Political career ==
She was elected to the Provincial Assembly of the Punjab as an independent candidate from PP-88 (Toba Tek Singh-V) in the 2002 Punjab provincial election. She received 29,559 votes and defeated Nazia Raheel. On 24 November 2003, she was inducted into the provincial cabinet of Chief Minister Chaudhry Pervaiz Elahi and was appointed Provincial Minister of Punjab for Women Development, with the additional ministerial portfolio of Human Rights.

In June 2004, she was given the additional ministerial portfolio of Social Welfare. She served as Minister for Women Development, Human Rights, and Social Welfare till 30 November 2006. On 1 December 2006, she was appointed Provincial Minister of Punjab for Women Development.

She was re-elected to the Provincial Assembly of the Punjab as a candidate of the Pakistan Tehreek-e-Insaf (PTI) from PP-122 (Toba Tek Singh-V) in the 2018 Punjab provincial election.

On 12 September 2018, she was inducted into the provincial cabinet of Chief Minister Usman Buzdar. On 13 September 2018, she was appointed Provincial Minister of Punjab for Women Development.

She ran for a seat in the Provincial Assembly from PP-122 Toba Tek Singh-V as a candidate of the PTI in the 2024 Punjab provincial election.
