= Jabboana =

- Location within Pakistan
- Coordinates: 31.06°N 72.05°E
- Country: Pakistan
- Province: Punjab
- Elevation: 149 m (489 ft)
- Time zone: UTC+5 (PST)
- Number of Union councils: 1

Jabboana is a town of Jhang District in the Punjab province of Pakistan, near the bank of the Jhelum River. It is named after Jabboana, a Sial tribe sub-clan, who are affiliated with agriculture and politics of the area. It resides in the union counsel of Jabboana. Previously, it was under Kot Murad. It has population of around 10,000 and area of 20,000 square feet. The Sial tribe has different sub tribes such as Jabboana Fatiana Soi Sial and others.
