= Sheikh Waqas Akram =

Member of National Assembly of Pakistan

- شیخ وقاص اکرم
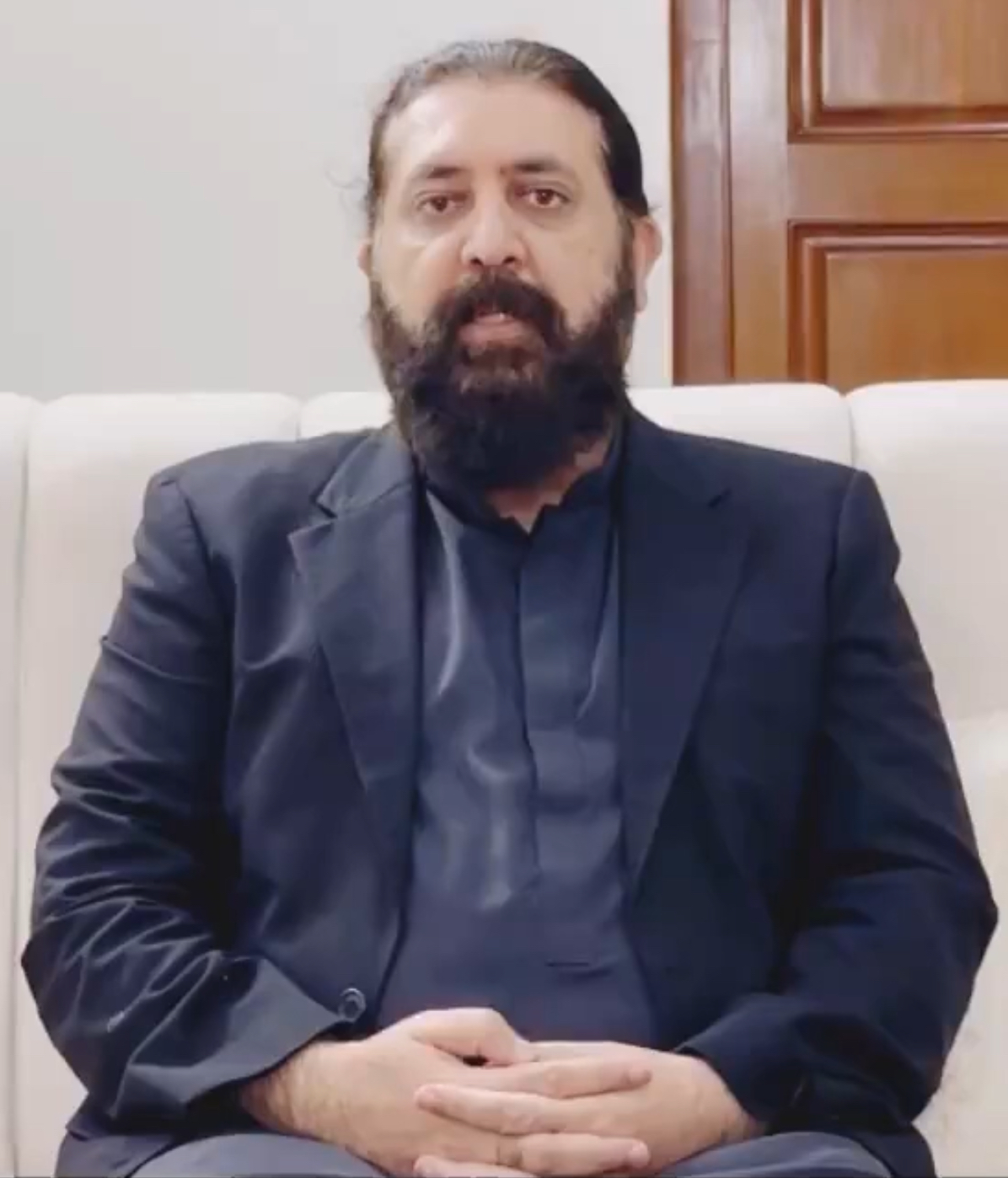

Information Secretary of PTI
- Incumbent
- Assumed office 26 September 2024
- Preceded by: Raoof Hasan

Member of the National Assembly of Pakistan
- Incumbent
- Assumed office 29 February 2024
- Constituency: NA-109 Jhang-II
- In office 17 March 2008 – 16 March 2013
- Preceded by: Himself
- Succeeded by: Sheikh Muhammad Akram
- Constituency: NA-89 Jhang-I
- In office 16 November 2002 – 15 November 2007
- Preceded by: Molana Azam Tariq Muhammad Ahmed Ludhianvi
- Succeeded by: Himself
- Constituency: NA-89 Jhang-I

Minister for Education and Trainings
- In office 26 June 2012 – 16 March 2013

Personal details
- Born: Jhang, Punjab, Pakistan
- Citizenship: Pakistan
- Party: PTI (2023-present)
- Other political affiliations: IND (2018-2023); PMLN (2013-2018); PML(Q) (2002-2013)
- Relations: Sheikh Muhammad Akram (father)

Sheikh Waqas Akram (Urdu: شیخ وقاص اکرم; born 26 August 1976) is a Pakistani politician and a member of the National Assembly of Pakistan from NA-109 Jhang-II since 29 February 2024. He previously served as a member of the National Assembly from November 2002 to November 2007 and from March 2008 to March 2013. He joined the PTI in early 2023 and was appointed as the Information Secretary of the party, which he is serving as today.

== Early life and education ==
Sheikh Waqas Akram was born on 26 August 1976 in Jhang, Punjab. His father Sheikh Muhammad Akram is also a prominent politician who was later described as having a political duo with his son Waqas.

He completed his matriculation from the Abbottabad Public School. He failed his A-level education, and subsequently tried to pass intermediate from Government College, Lahore, but failed that too.

=== Disqualification for fake degrees ===
He was disqualified for some time as he had reportedly submitted fake A-levels certificate while filing his nomination papers for elections. He has submitted multiple fake educational documents, and committed perjury for which he was disqualified for a long time.

== Business career ==
He is associated with transport businesses, notably Shorkot Transport Company, owned by his father, a large-scale Pakistani transport operator.

=== Murder case ===
In August 2019, Sheikh Waqas Akram and members of his family were implicated in a high-profile legal case following the death of motorcycle rickshaw passengers in Jhang. Akram, his father, and his brother Sheikh Fawad Akram were named in a first information report alleging that they had directed an employee of Shorkot Transport Company to run over the victims, relatives of a complainant involved in an earlier road accident case. The group was subsequently granted pre-arrest interim bail by a sessions court in Jhang while the case remained under investigation.

== Political career ==
=== Early tenure (2002–2013) ===
He entered politics as a member of the Pakistan Muslim League (Q) (PML-Q) in 2002 and won a seat in the 2008 Pakistani general election from NA-89 Jhang on a PML-Q ticket. Following his election as a member of the National Assembly of Pakistan, he was made Minister of State for Overseas Pakistanis Labor and Manpower in the PPP-led Gillani government as a coalition partner from 2011 to 2012. He then served as Federal Minister of Education and Trainings in the Raja Pervaiz Ashraf government from 2012 to 2013, again as a coalition partner to PPP, while still being a member of the PML-Q.

=== Transition to PML-N and Independent candidacy (2013–2023) ===
In March 2013, in the run up to the 2013 Pakistani general election, he joined the Pakistan Muslim League (N) (PML-N). His decision to join the PML-N came while still being an incumbent lawmaker and minister for the PML-Q. He could not take part in 2013 general elections because a returning officer rejected his nomination papers based on a letter sent by the Higher Education Commission of Pakistan (HEC) about his declared fake degrees. He later challenged his rejection in a higher court tribunal which allowed him to contest the election, though he decided not to contest the elections.

Prior to the 2018 Pakistani general election, he was offered to run as a candidate of the PML-N from NA-115 Jhang-II. Despite being described as a loyal and strong member of the PML-N, Sheikh Waqas Akram refused to contest on a PML-N ticket, and instead attempted to run in the same constituency for the Pakistan Tehreek-e-Insaf (PTI). Waqas was denied a PTI ticket, as the PTI selected Ghulam Bibi Bharwana to run from NA-115 Jhang-II. Following this, Waqas Akram opted to run as an Independent candidate from the constituency but failed to win against Ghulam Bibi Bharwana and PTI.

=== Affiliation with PTI (2023–present) ===
On 11 March 2023, Waqas Akram joined the Pakistan Tehreek-e-Insaf declaring allegiance to the Haqiqi Azadi March and the party's manifesto.

On 9 February 2024, amid the 2024 Pakistani general election, independent candidate Sheikh Waqas Akram, supported by the Pakistan Tehreek-e-Insaf (PTI), emerged victorious in the National Assembly seat for constituency NA-109 Jhang, as reported by Geo News. The election saw Waqas Akram garner 176,586 votes, defeating his closest rival, Sheikh Yaqub of the Pakistan Muslim League (N), by a margin of 114,799 votes. Waqas Akram's campaign, which focused on major problems of Jhang with the youth, resonated with voters, leading to his decisive win. With this victory, Waqas Akram becomes the new representative for NA-109 Jhang.

Waqas' father Sheikh Muhammad Akram is currently a member of the Punjab Assembly from the PTI-backed Sunni Ittehad Council.

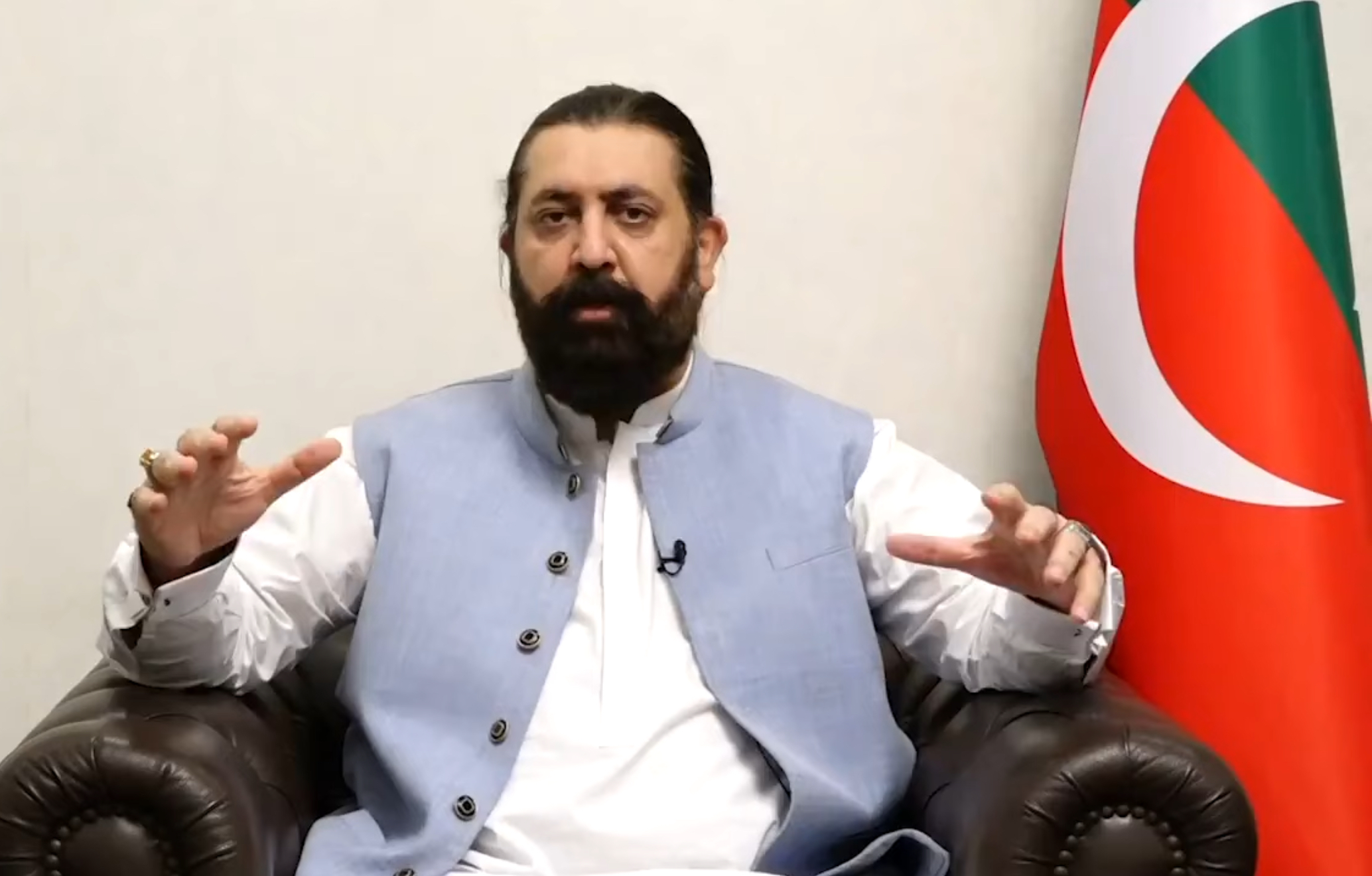
Waqas gives a statement in October 2024 as Information Secretary of Pakistan Tehreek-e-Insaf.
