= Bharwana =

The Bharwana or Bhorwana (Punjabi: بھرواݨہ; Urdu: بھروانہ) are a sub-clan of the Sial tribe, mainly settled in the villages along the river Chenab in the Jhang and Chiniot districts.

== Notable people with the surname ==
- Saleem Bibi Bharwana
- Mehar Muhammad Aslam Bharwana
- Saima Akhtar Bharwana
- Ghulam Bibi Bharwana

== See also ==
- Chund Bharwana
- Qaim Bharwana
