= NA-108 Jhang-I =

Constituency of the National Assembly of Pakistan

- Constituency for the National Assembly of Pakistan
- Region: Athara Hazari Tehsil and Jhang Tehsil (partly) of Jhang District
- Electorate: 582,504

Current constituency
- Party: Pakistan Tehreek-e-Insaf
- Member: Sahabzada Mehboob Sultan
- Created from: NA-91 Jhang-VI

NA-108 Jhang-I (این اے-108، جھنگ-1) is a constituency for the National Assembly of Pakistan. It is based on the old NA-91 with the main difference being the transfer of the city of Ahmedpur Sial to the new NA-116.

== Members of Parliament ==
=== 2018–2023: NA-114 Jhang-I ===
Election	Member	Party
2018	Sahabzada Mehboob Sultan	PTI

=== 2024–present: NA-108 Jhang-I ===
Election	Member	Party
2024	Sahabzada Mehboob Sultan	PTI

== Election 2002 ==
General elections were held on 10 October 2002. Muhammad Mehboob Sultan of PML-Q won by 53,545 votes.

General election 2002: NA-91 Jhang-VI
Party	Candidate	Votes	%	±%
PML(Q)	Sahibzada Muhammad Mehboob Sultan	53,545	39.12	
PPP	Makhdoom Syed Faisal Saleh Hayat	45,428	33.19	
Independent	Attaullah Khan	36,173	26.43	
Others	Others (three candidates)	1,730	1.26	
Turnout		140,438	53.64	
Total valid votes		136,876	97.46	
Rejected ballots		3,562	2.54	
Majority		8,117	5.93	
Registered electors		261,795		

== Election 2008 ==
General elections were held on 18 February 2008. Muhammad Mehboob Sultan of PML-Q won by 75,803 votes.

General election 2008: NA-91 Jhang-VI
Party	Candidate	Votes	%	±%
PML(Q)	Sahibzada Muhammad Mehboob Sultan	75,803	50.36	
PPP	Attaullah Khan	65,253	43.35	
PML(N)	Sahibzada Muhammad Tahir Sultan	9,458	6.28	
Turnout		155,703	48.62	
Total valid votes		150,514	96.67	
Rejected ballots		5,189	3.33	
Majority		10,550	7.01	
Registered electors		320,219		
PML(Q) hold				

== Election 2013 ==
General elections were held on 11 May 2013. Independent candidate Najaf Abbas Khan Sial won by 91,301 votes and became the member of National Assembly.

General election 2013: NA-91 Jhang-VI
Party	Candidate	Votes	%	±%
Independent	Najaf Abbas Sial	91,301	49.67	
PML(N)	Sahibzada Muhammad Mehboob Sultan	87,048	47.36	
Others	Others (five candidates)	5,457	2.97	
Turnout		190,053	68.11	
Total valid votes		183,806	96.71	
Rejected ballots		6,247	3.29	
Majority		4,253	2.31	
Registered electors		279,042		
Independent gain from PML(Q)				

== Election 2018 ==
General elections were held on 25 July 2018.

General election 2018: NA-114 Jhang-I
Party	Candidate	Votes	%	±%
PTI	Sahabzada Mehboob Sultan	106,043	35.98	
PPP	Faisal Saleh Hayat	105,454	35.78	
Independent	Aleesha Iftikhar	65,440	22.20	
Independent	Muhammad Asif Muavia Sial	9,710	3.29	
Others	Others (six candidates)	11,102	2.75	
Turnout		307,719	62.45	
Total valid votes		294,749	95.79	
Rejected ballots		12,970	4.21	
Majority		589	0.20	
Registered electors		492,782		
PTI gain from PML(N)				

== Election 2024 ==
General elections were held on 8 February 2024. Sahabzada Mehboob Sultan won the election with 169,676 votes.

General election 2024: NA-108 Jhang-I
Party	Candidate	Votes	%	±%
PTI	Sahabzada Mehboob Sultan (Note: Filed nomination papers as PTI candidate but ECP allowed him to run as an Independent)	169,676	50.65	▲14.67
PML(N)	Faisal Saleh Hayat	134,369	40.11	
Others	Others (fifteen candidates)	30,922	9.23	
Turnout		345,792	59.36	▼3.09
Total valid votes		334,967	96.87	
Rejected ballots		10,825	3.13	
Majority		35,307	10.54	▲10.34
Registered electors		334,967		

== See also ==
- NA-107 Toba Tek Singh-III
- NA-109 Jhang-II
