= Umrana Janoobi =

Pakistani village

- Village
- Location within Pakistan
- Coordinates: 31°25′01″N 72°15′45″E
- Country: Pakistan
- Province: Punjab
- District: Jhang

Area
  - Total: 10 km^{2} (3.9 sq mi)

Population
  - Total: 12,000 approx.
- Time zone: UTC+5 (PST)
- Calling code: 047

Umrana Janoobi is a village located near the confluence of Jhelum River and Chenab River in Jhang District of Punjab, Pakistan.

Umrana Sial, a sub-clan of Sial tribe is the dominant tribe in this village.

The village is divided into its main settlements:

- Basti Hamdani
- Basti Hashmani
- Basti Kharyani
- Basti Dulyani
- Basti Mumtani, also known as Raakh Wala Khoh.
- Basti Sadyani
- Basti Hamboani
- Basti Budhyani
- Basti Kamrani, also known as Kamrana /Hamaom Wala Khoh
- Basti Salyani
- Bilherr
- 5 Marla Scheme
- 7 Marla Scheme
- 40 Wala Pattan
- Bindi
- Chhallay Wala

Education:

The village has a government school up to primary level for boys and a primary level school for girls.

Health:

There is no public healthcare unit in this village. Residents use the nearest THQ hospital in Athara Hazari Tehsil, located in Wasu town.

Crops:

Wheat, Sugarcane, Rice, Cotton, etc.

Weather:

People enjoy all-weather in this area.

The temperature crosses 45 degrees at Celsius scale in Summer Season and in Winter, drops to zero.

Games:

Pehlwani, Gillidanda, Horse Riding, Kabaddi, Bhangra (music), Cricket.

Language and Culture:

Punjabi (Jhangochi dialect) and Urdu are the mostly spoken languages of this village.

Most of the people wear shalwar kameez while old age people prefer to wear chaadar (laacha and lungi) with kameez.

For footwear, people prefer "Khussa" during cultural festivals.

Religion:

100% Islam.

Nearest Places:

Jhang 35 km away by road distance.

Athara Hazari 3 km

THQ Hospital 4 km

Tehsil Offices and Police Station 3 km

Nadra Office 3 km

High School and College 3 km

Trimmu Barrage 8 km
