= Fawad Hasan Fawad =

Pakistani politician and government official (born 1960)

- فواد حسن فواد
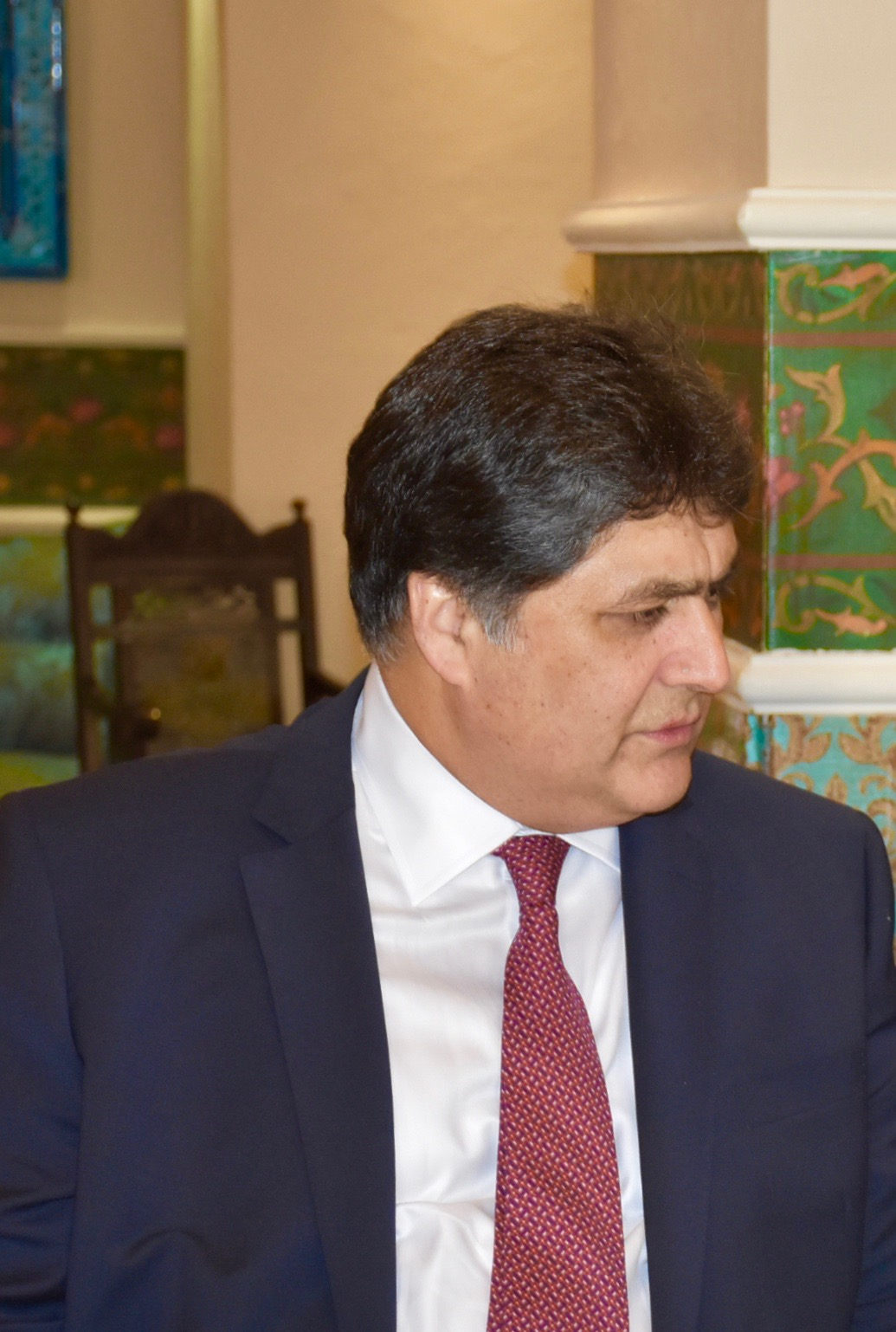

Federal Minister for Privatisation
- In office 16 September 2023 – 4 March 2024
- Prime Minister: Anwaar ul Haq Kakar
- Preceded by: Shamshad Akhtar
- Succeeded by: Aleem Khan

Federal Minister for Inter Provincial Coordination
- In office 12 December 2023 – 4 March 2024
- Prime Minister: Anwaar ul Haq Kakar
- Preceded by: Ehsan ur Rehman Mazari
- Succeeded by: Rana Sana Ullah

Director General Civil Services Academy of Pakistan
- In office 1 June 2018 – 5 July 2018
- Preceded by: Azmat Ali Ranjha
- Succeeded by: Suhail Aamir

24th Principal Secretary to the Prime Minister of Pakistan
- In office 21 November 2015 – 1 June 2018
- Preceded by: Javaid Aslam
- Succeeded by: Suhail Aamir

Personal details
- Born: Rawalpindi, Punjab, Pakistan
- Relatives: Raoof Hassan (brother); Khurshid Hasan Khurshid (brother-in-law)
- Education: King's College London
- Website: Official website

Fawad Hasan Fawad (Urdu: فواد حسن فواد) is a Pakistani public policy practitioner, former civil servant who served in BPS-22 grade as the Principal Secretary to two Prime Ministers Nawaz Sharif and Shahid Khaqan Abbasi; and later as caretaker Federal Minister for Privatisation and Federal Minister for Inter Provincial Coordination.

His work during his tenure as the Principal Secretary to the Prime Minister of Pakistan from November 2015 to June 2018 was largely focused on the fruition of the China–Pakistan Economic Corridor, effectively spearheading multiple infrastructure and energy projects and directing sector-wide investment across the nation.

Fawad was promoted to the rank of Federal Secretary in December 2017.

== Early life and education ==
Fawad was born and brought up in Rawalpindi, his father having moved from the Kashmir Valley to Sialkot before settling down in Rawalpindi, and Fawad is the youngest of five brothers. His brother Raoof Hassan, a political and security strategist, was appointed as the Central Information Secretary of Imran Khan's PTI in May 2023.

He had his education at Technical School, Tariqabad, Lalkurti and later at Sir Syed college, The Mall, Rawalpindi.

In 1982, he studied to become a lawyer (LLB) at the University of the Punjab, Lahore, in 1987-89 he trained at the Civil Services Academy, Lahore, and in 2000-2001 he did his LLM (Corporate Finance) from the King's College, University of London, UK, his fields of specialization including capital market regulation, international finance and international trade. In his early years he also played some first-class cricket with Majid Khan and participated in morning radio-shows.

== Career ==
=== Public service ===
Fawad belongs to the Pakistan Administrative Service, formerly referred to as the District Management Group and served as Director General of the Civil Services Academy from 1 June 2018 to 5 July 2018. Before joining the Civil Services Academy as Director General, he served as Principal Secretary to two Prime Ministers, Shahid Khaqan Abbasi and Nawaz Sharif. Fawad also served as Punjab's Provincial Secretary for Health, Communication & Works as well as held other portfolios.

Fawad has served in the Government of Pakistan, Government of Punjab and Government of Balochistan. He is batchmates with Zafarullah Khan (PAS), Shoaib Mir (PAS), Sikandar Sultan Raja (PAS), Tahir Hussain (PAS), Rizwan Ahmed (PAS), Suleman Khan (PSP), Jawad Rafique Malik (PAS) and Allah Dino Khawaja (PSP).

Fawad served as Secretary to Chief Minister Punjab (Implementation), and Punjab from July 2012 to April 2013. Fawad served as Joint Secretary, Economic Affairs Division from April 2013 to 4 June 2013. From July 1994 to March 1997, Fawad Hasan Fawad served as Deputy Commissioner Quetta and Lahore; being the youngest individual to do so in Pakistan's history. He also served as Principal Staff Officer to Principal Secretary to Prime Minister of Pakistan and Deputy Secretary to Chief Secretary Balochistan. Earlier, he served as Assistant Commissioner in Quetta and Hub from August 1989 to January 1993.

=== Private sector ===
His services in the financial sector included his appointment as Senior Group Advisor to the JS Group, Executive-in-Charge Infrastructure Development Division Bank Alfalah Limited from August 2005 to November 2006.

== Controversies ==
=== Corruption allegations, arrest and acquittal (2018–2023) ===
Fawad Hasan Fawad was accused of corruption and misuse of authority by Pakistan's National Accountability Bureau (NAB) in the Ashiana Housing scam. He was arrested by NAB on 6 July 2018 in the Ashiana Housing scam criminal investigation and was sent on fourteen days physical remand by an accountability court in Lahore. He directed the PLDC management to cancel the contract of Ashiana Iqbal without any inquiry. On 14 February 2019 the Lahore High Court division bench comprising Justice Malik Shahzad Ahmad Khan and Justice Mirza Viqas Rauf also granted bail to Fawad, former implementation secretary to the chief minister, in the Ashiana Housing scam, but denied him bail in another NAB reference relating to assets beyond means. On 21 January 2020 Fawad was granted bail in the Assets case by the Lahore High Court by a two-judge bench comprising Justice Muhammad Tariq Abbasi and Justice Chaudhry Mushtaq, on the grounds that no illegitimate asset belonging to him had been unearthed by the National Accountability Bureau (NAB), no charge had been framed against him and that there was no nexus between him and any asset, however he had been arrested at the inquiry stage.

On 2 February 2023, Fawad was acquitted of all charges in the assets beyond means and the Ashiana Housing cases on merit due to irrefutable documentary evidence provided by the prosecution's witnesses.

== Book ==
- Kunj-e-Qafas, Nigarshat Publications, 2023. Urdu poetry.

== See also ==
- Government of Pakistan
- Akbar Bugti
- Maleeha Lodhi
- Anwaar-ul-Haq Kakar
- Khurshid Hasan Khurshid
