= NA-107 Toba Tek Singh-III =

Constituency of the National Assembly of Pakistan

- Constituency for the National Assembly of Pakistan
- Region: Kamalia Tehsil and Pirmahal Tehsil (partly) of Toba Tek Singh District
- Electorate: 509,787

Current constituency
- Party: Pakistan Tehreek-e-Insaf
- Member: Riaz Fatyana
- Created from: NA-94 Toba Tek Singh-III

NA-107 Toba Tek Singh-III (این اے-١٠۷، ٹوبہ ٹيک سنگھ-٣) is a constituency for the National Assembly of Pakistan.

== Members of Parliament ==
=== 2018–2023: NA-113 Toba Tek Singh-III ===
Election	Member	Party
2018	Riaz Fatyana	PTI

=== 2024–present: NA-107 Toba Tek Singh-III ===
Election	Member	Party
2024	Riaz Fatyana	PTI

== Election 2002 ==
General elections were held on 10 October 2002. Riaz Fatiana an independent candidate won by 67,603 votes.

General election 2002: NA-94 Toba Tek Singh-III
Party	Candidate	Votes	%	±%
Independent	Riaz Fatyana	67,603	39.74	
PPP	Khalid Ahmed Khan Kharal	53,164	31.25	
PML(N)	Asad Ur Rehman	44,942	26.42	
Others	Others (six candidates)	4,422	2.59	
Turnout		174,949	50.85	
Total valid votes		170,131	97.25	
Rejected ballots		5,818	2.75	
Majority		14,439	8.49	
Registered electors		344,077		

== Election 2008 ==
General elections were held on 18 February 2008. Riaz Fatiana of PML-Q won by 63,444 votes.

General election 2008: NA-94 Toba Tek Singh-III
Party	Candidate	Votes	%	±%
PML(Q)	Riaz Fatyana	63,444	34.40	
PPP	Haider Ali Khan Kharal	59,348	32.18	
PML(N)	Asad Ur Rehman	59,284	32.14	
Others	Others (seven candidates)	2,354	1.23	
Turnout		190,470	60.52	
Total valid votes		184,430	96.83	
Rejected ballots		6,040	3.17	
Majority		4,096	2.22	
Registered electors		314,704		
PML(Q) gain from Independent				

== Election 2013 ==
General elections were held on 11 May 2013. Asad Ur Rehman of PML-N won by 103,581 votes and became the member of National Assembly.

General election 2013: NA-94 Toba Tek Singh-III
Party	Candidate	Votes	%	±%
PML(N)	Asad Ur Rehman	103,581	42.69	
PTI	Riaz Fatyana	66,960	27.60	
PPP	Syed Qutab Ali Shah Alias Ali Baba	66,372	27.36	
Others	Others (fourteen candidates)	5,714	2.35	
Turnout		250,918	65.08	
Total valid votes		242,627	96.70	
Rejected ballots		8,291	3.30	
Majority		36,621	15.09	
Registered electors		385,561		
PML(N) gain from PML(Q)				

== Election 2018 ==
General elections were held on 25 July 2018.

General election 2018: NA-113 Toba Tek Singh-III
Party	Candidate	Votes	%	±%
PTI	Riaz Fatyana	128,274	50.31	
PML(N)	Asad Ur Rehman	106,018	41.58	
Others	Others (thirteen candidates)	20,677	8.11	
Turnout		262,848	59.90	
Total valid votes		254,969	97.00	
Rejected ballots		7,879	3.00	
Majority		22,256	8.73	
Registered electors		438,842		
PTI gain from PML(N)				

== Election 2024 ==
General elections were held on 8 February 2024. Riaz Fatyana won the election with 129,971 votes.

General election 2024: NA-107 Toba Tek Singh-III
Party	Candidate	Votes	%	±%
PTI	Riaz Fatyana (Note: Filed nomination papers as PTI candidate but ECP allowed him to run as an independent)	129,971	45.27	▼5.04
PML(N)	Asad Ur Rehman	96,083	33.47	▼8.11
Independent	Haider Ali	16,139	5.62	
TLP	Hafiz Farrukh Saleem	14,411	5.02	▲1.87
Independent	Syed Azher Hussain Shah	12,957	4.51	
Others	Others (twenty-one candidates)	17,523	6.10	
Turnout		298,166	58.49	▼1.41
Total valid votes		287,084	96.28	
Rejected ballots		11,082	3.72	
Majority		33,888	11.80	▲3.07
Registered electors		509,787		

== See also ==
- NA-106 Toba Tek Singh-II
- NA-108 Jhang-I
