= Mukhiana =

- Village
- Location within Pakistan
- Coordinates: 31°25′01″N 72°15′45″E
- Country: Pakistan
- Province: Punjab
- District: Jhang
- Time zone: UTC+5 (PST)

Mukhiana is a village in Jhang District, Punjab, Pakistan located near the Jhang–Chiniot Road, 5 kilometres (3.1 mi) from Shabbir Abad. It is a village of the Bharwana tribe, a sub-caste of Sial, and is also known as Chak Sialan.

A boys high school, Govt High School Mukhiana, is located in the village.
