= Constituency NA-87 =

Former constituency of the National Assembly of Pakistan

Constituency NA-87 (Jhang-II)
- Former constituency for the National Assembly of Pakistan
- Region: Jhang District

Former constituency
- Abolished: 2018

Constituency NA-87 (Jhang-II) (Urdu: این اے-۸۷، جھنگ-۲) was a constituency for the National Assembly of Pakistan from 1970 to 2018. It comprised Bhowana Tehsil and some areas of Chiniot and Jhang Tehsils. Upon new delimitation in 2018, this constituency's areas were divided among NA-100, NA-115 and NA-116.

== Election 2002 ==
General elections were held on 10 Oct 2002. Makhdoom Syed Faisal Saleh Hayat of PPP won by 72,162 votes.

General election 2002: NA-87 Jhang-II
Party	Candidate	Votes	%	±%
PPP	Makhdoom Syed Faisal Saleh Hayat	76,201	50.36	
PML(Q)	Abida Hussain	65,436	43.24	
MMA	Abdul Waris	4,565	3.02	
Independent	Irfan Qaisar Sheikh	3,598	2.38	
Others	Others (three candidates)	1,520	1.00	.
Turnout		158,031	48.13	
Total valid votes		151,320	95.75	
Rejected ballots		6,711	4.25	
Majority		10,765	7.12	
Registered electors		328,321		

== Election 2008 ==
General elections were held on 18 Feb 2008. Makhdoom Syed Faisal Saleh Hayat of PML-Q won by 72,162 votes.

General election 2008: NA-87 Jhang-II
Party	Candidate	Votes	%	±%
PML(Q)	Makhdoom Syed Faisal Saleh Hayat	72,162	44.84	
PPP	Syeda Abida Hussain	56,892	35.35	
Independent	Rai Sarfraz Ahmed Bhatti	23,885	14.84	
PML(N)	Syed Raza Ali Bukhari	7,995	4.97	
Turnout		169,458	45.46	
Total valid votes		160,934	94.97	
Rejected ballots		8,524	5.03	
Majority		15,270	9.49	
Registered electors		372,743		

== Election 2013 ==
General elections were held on 11 May 2013. Ghulam Muhammad Lali of PML-N won by 93,651 votes and became the member of National Assembly.

General election 2013: NA-87 Jhang-II
Party	Candidate	Votes	%	±%
PML(N)	Ghulam Muhammad Lali	94,234	45.34	
Independent	Makhdoom Syed Faisal Saleh Hayat	80,761	38.85	
PPP	Syed Abid Hussain Imam	17,251	8.30	
JI	Ch. Sajid Ali Chadhar	11,148	5.36	
Others	Others (seven candidates)	4,469	2.14	
Turnout		216,351	58.85	
Total valid votes		207,863	96.08	
Rejected ballots		8,488	3.92	
Majority		13,473	6.49	
Registered electors		367,617		
