= Mehar (name) =

Mehar (Urdu/Punjabi: مہر) is an honorary title used in Punjab region in Pakistan and India. In Pakistan Mehar title is used by Punjabi Arain, Gujjar and Sial tribes. It maybe confused with Mahar (مھر) a sindhi tribe or Mahar (مہار) a marathi tribe

== Given name ==
- Mehar Bano (born 1984), Pakistani actress
- Mehar Chand Bhaskar, Indian weightlifter
- Mehar Singh Dahiya (1916–1945), Indian poet
- Mehar Chand Dhawan (1912–?), Indian sprinter and triple jumper
- Mehar Mittal (1934–2016), Indian Punjabi actor and producer
- Mehar Hamid Rashid, Pakistani politician
- Mehar Singh, Fijian trade unionist
- Mehar Singh (1915–1952), Indian fighter pilot

== Surname ==
- Ram Mehar (born 1934), Indian long jumper
