= Handlana =

- Village
- Location within Pakistan
- Coordinates: 31.29°N 72.50°E
- Country: Pakistan
- Province: Punjab
- District: Chiniot
- Tehsil: Bhawana
- Time zone: UTC+5 (PST)

Handlana (Urdu: ہَندلانہ) is a village of Bhawana Tehsil in Punjab, Pakistan. It is located on the road connecting Bhawana and Painsra. The village has a population of 3,500 (approximately).

The village is name after Handlana, a sub-caste of Sial tribe.
