= Qaim Bharwana =

Town in Punjab, Pakistan

- Town
- Location within Pakistan
- Coordinates: 31°25′01″N 72°15′45″E
- Country: Pakistan
- Province: Punjab
- District: Jhang

Population (2017 census)
  - Total: 2,744,085 (Jhang District)
- Time zone: UTC+5 (PST)

Qaim Bharwana is a town of Shorkot Tehsil, Jhang District in Punjab province of Pakistan.

The town was among the many areas of Shorkot Tehsil vulnerable to very high floods in the River Chenab in September 2014.
