= NA-109 Jhang-II =

Constituency of the National Assembly of Pakistan

- Constituency for the National Assembly of Pakistan
- Region: Jhang Tehsil (partly) including Jhang City and Shorkot Tehsil (partly) of Jhang District
- Electorate: 593,022

Current constituency
- Party: Pakistan Tehreek-e-Insaf
- Member: Sheikh Waqas Akram
- Created from: NA-89 Jhang-IV; NA-87 Jhang-II

NA-109 Jhang-II (این اے-109، جھنگ-2) is a constituency for the National Assembly of Pakistan. It is based on the old NA-89 with the main difference being the transfer of the town of Bagh to the new NA-116 and the inclusion of Jhang No. 2 from the old NA-87.

== Members of Parliament ==
=== 2018–2023: NA-115 Jhang-II ===
Election	Member	Party
2018	Ghulam Bibi Bharwana	PTI

=== 2024–present: NA-109 Jhang-II ===
Election	Member	Party
2024	Sheikh Waqas Akram	PTI

== Election 2002 ==
General elections were held on 10 October 2002. Maulana Muhammad Azam Tariq an independent candidate won by 41,425 votes.

General election 2002: NA-89 Jhang-IV
Party	Candidate	Votes	%	±%
Independent	Muhammad Azam Tariq	41,425	36.68	
PAT	Muhammad Tahir-ul-Qadri	34,183	30.27	
NA	Sheikh Waqas Akram	31,959	28.30	
Others	Others (twelve candidates)	5,380	4.75	
Turnout		116,472	47.63	
Total valid votes		112,947	96.97	
Rejected ballots		3,525	3.03	
Majority		7,242	6.41	
Registered electors		244,542		

== Election 2008 ==
General elections were held on 18 February 2008. Sheikh Waqas Akram of PML-Q won by 51,976 votes.

General election 2008: NA-89 Jhang-IV
Party	Candidate	Votes	%	±%
PML(Q)	Sheikh Waqas Akram	51,976	41.44	
Independent	Muhammad Ahmad Ludhianvi	45,216	36.05	
PML(N)	Dr. Abu-Ul-Hassan Ansari	15,743	12.55	
PPP	Sheikh Waqar Ahmad	9,363	7.47	
Others	Others (eight candidates)	3,123	2.49	
Turnout		130,449	41.71	
Total valid votes		125,421	96.15	
Rejected ballots		5,028	3.85	
Majority		6,760	5.39	
Registered electors		312,773		

== Election 2013 ==
General elections were held on 11 May 2013. Sheikh Muhammad Akram of PML-N won by 74,324 votes and became the member of National Assembly. However an Election tribunal on 4 April 2014 disqualified him on the charges of bogus voting and bank loan default, and named the runner up Maulana Mohammad Ahmed Ludhianvi of Ahle Sunnat Wal Jamaat as the winner.

General election 2013: NA-89 Jhang-IV
Party	Candidate	Votes	%	±%
PML(N)	Sheikh Muhammad Akram	75,053	44.53	
MDM	Muhammad Ahmad Ludhianvi	72,320	42.91	
Others	Others (nineteen candidates)	21,178	12.56	
Turnout		172,992	59.54	
Total valid votes		168,551	97.43	
Rejected ballots		4,441	2.57	
Majority		2,733	1.62	
Registered electors		290,555		

== Election 2018 ==
General elections were held on 25 July 2018.

General election 2018: NA-115 Jhang-II
Party	Candidate	Votes	%	±%
PTI	Ghulam Bibi Bharwana	91,434	36.01	
Independent	Muhammad Ahmed Ludhianvi	68,616	27.02	
Independent	Sheikh Waqas Akram	60,598	23.86	
Others	Others (eight candidates)	33,283	13.11	
Turnout		262,826	57.39	
Total valid votes		253,931	96.62	
Rejected ballots		8,895	3.38	
Majority		22,818	8.99	
Registered electors		457,988		
PTI gain from Sipah-e-Sahaba Pakistan				

== Election 2024 ==
General elections were held on 8 February 2024. Sheikh Waqas Akram won the election with 176,699 votes.

General election 2024: NA-109 Jhang-II
Party	Candidate	Votes	%	±%
PTI	Sheikh Waqas Akram (Note: Filed nomination papers as PTI candidate but ECP allowed him to run as an independent)	176,699	58.98	▲22.97
PML(N)	Muhammad Yaqub Sheikh	61,803	20.63	▲16.79
PRHP	Muhammad Ahmed Ludhianvi	36,410	12.15	
Others	Others (eighteen candidates)	24,691	8.24	
Turnout		308,690	52.05	▼5.34
Total valid votes		299,603	97.06	
Rejected ballots		9,087	2.94	
Majority		114,896	38.35	▲29.36
Registered electors		593,022		

== See also ==
- NA-108 Jhang-I
- NA-110 Jhang-III
