= Raoof Hasan =

Pakistani writer and political analyst

- رؤف حسن
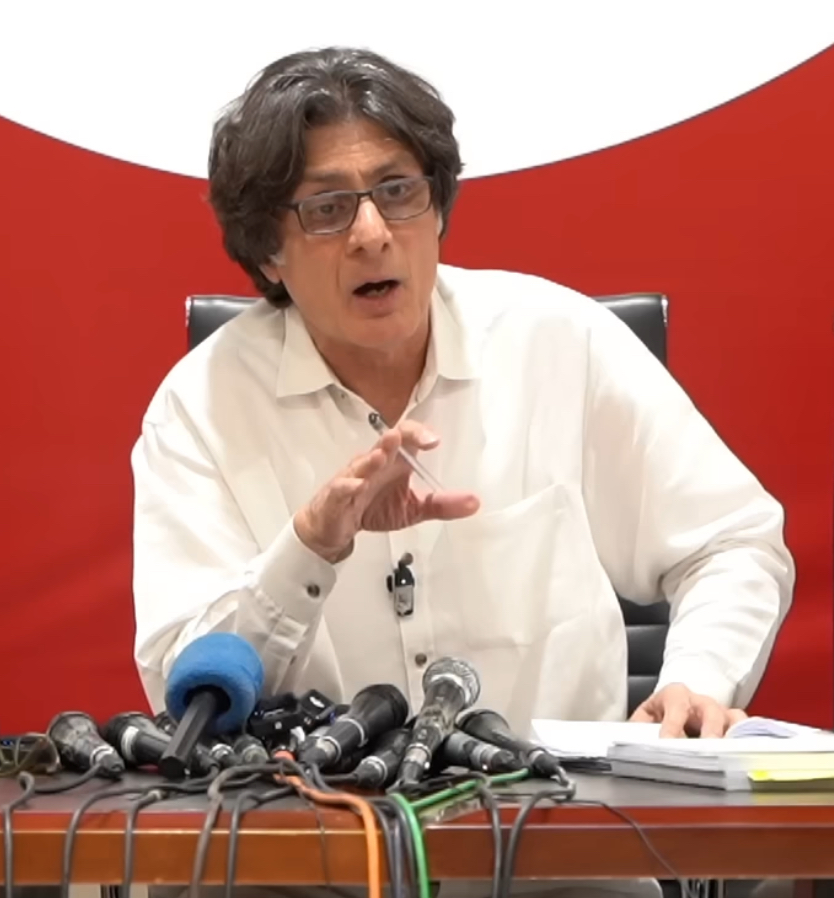

Information Secretary and Spokesperson of PTI
- In office 27 May 2023 – 26 September 2024
- Preceded by: Ali Muhammad Khan
- Succeeded by: Sheikh Waqas Akram

Personal details
- Born: Rawalpindi, Punjab, Pakistan
- Party: PTI (2023-present)
- Relations: Fawad Hasan Fawad (brother)

Raoof Hasan (Urdu: رؤف حسن) is a Pakistani writer and political analyst who previously served as the information secretary and spokesperson of PTI and also served as special assistant to Prime Minister Imran Khan.

He's the head of the PTI policy think tank as well of the Regional Peace Institute.

== Early life and education ==
Hasan was born in Rawalpindi into a family of Kashmiri descent. He is one of five brothers, including Fawad Hasan Fawad, a senior civil servant known for his association with the Sharif family.

After initially enrolling at Gordon College, Rawalpindi, he left to join the Pakistan Army. However, his military career was interrupted by an accident, leading to his departure from the Pakistan Military Academy (PMA) after approximately one and a half years. He subsequently returned to Gordon College, where he completed a Master's degree in English Literature.

In 2006, he was diagnosed with blood cancer. He spent approximately three and a half years receiving treatment at a hospital in London, followed by an extended period of recovery.

== Professional career ==
Following his graduation, he began teaching at his alma mater, Godon College, a position he held until the college was nationalized. Pursuing his interest in writing, he entered the advertising industry as a copywriter and subsequently established his own advertising agency, which he successfully ran for over twenty years.

== Political career ==
He served as the information secretary and spokesperson of Pakistan Tehreek-e-Insaf (PTI) from 27 May 2023 to 26 September 2024.

=== 2024 arrest ===
In July 2024, he was arrested for spreading anti-state propaganda.

== Political views ==
While serving as Special Assistant to Prime Minister Imran Khan, Hasan commented on the 2020–2021 U.S. troop withdrawal from Afghanistan and the Taliban's takeover. He tweeted that Afghanistan experienced a nearly seamless transition of power from the corrupt Ghani government to the Taliban, and that the U.S.-backed structure in Afghanistan had collapsed "like the proverbial house of cards."

== Writings ==
Raoof Hasan is a prolific writer and political analyst whose work spans several prominent publications. His writings often delve into themes such as governance, national identity, and socio-political dynamics. He has contributed to outlets including The News International, Geo News, Daily Times, Narratives Magazine, and Arab News. His publications include:

- Michael Kugelman and Raoof Hasan, What a Year of Track II Discussions Says About the Future of US–Pakistan Relations, War on the Rocks, 30 November 2017.

== Bibliography ==
- Mohan, C. Raja; Singh, Hernaikh, eds. (7 June 2024). Biden And Beyond: The United States Rethinks South Asia. World Scientific Publishing Company. p. 96. ISBN 978-981-12-7644-6. Archived from the original on 18 August 2024.
- Sehri, Inam R. (9 June 2022). The History of a Disgraceful Surrender (2021). Grosvenor House Publishing. ISBN 978-1-80381-129-1.
