= Khalil-ur-Rehman Ramday =

Pakistani judge (born 1945)

Khalil-ur-Rehman Ramday خلیل الرحمان رمدے

Justice of the Supreme Court of Pakistan
- In office 15 January 2002 – 13 January 2010
- President: Pervez Musharraf; Asif Ali Zardari
- Prime Minister: Zafarullah Khan Jamali; Chaudhry Shujaat Hussain; Shaukat Aziz; Muhammad Mian Soomro; Yusuf Raza Gillani

Justice of the Lahore High Court
- In office 12 October 1988 – 15 January 2002
- President: Pervez Musharraf; Rafiq Tarar
- Prime Minister: Nawaz Sharif
- Governor: Shahid Hamid; Zulfiqar Ali Khosa; LGeneral Muhammad Safdar; LGeneral Khalid Maqbool

Personal details
- Born: Khalil-ur-Rehman Ramday; 1945 (age 80–81) Lahore, Punjab, British India
- Spouse: Quratulain Ramday
- Relations: Ch. Farooq Ramday (brother); Asad-ur-Rehman Ramday (brother); Usman Ramday (brother)
- Children: Mustafa Ramday; Aamena Ramday
- Education: Punjab University (LLB and JD); Guru Nanak Dev University (DL)
- Notable Awards: Nishan-E-Imtiaz, Krishan Kishore Grover Goodwill Gold Medal

Khalil-ur-Rehman Ramday (Punjabi, Urdu: خلیل الرحمان رمدے) is a Pakistani philanthropist, and former jurist who served as senior judge of the Supreme Court of Pakistan from 2002 to 2010. He restored democracy to Pakistan with a historic judgement against military president Pervez Musharraf.

== Early life and education ==
After receiving his early education at different schools in the Punjab, Ramday matriculated from Central Model School, Lahore, and enrolled at the Government College, Lahore from where he migrated to Gordon College, Rawalpindi, on account of his father's posting in the Federal Ministry of Law.

At Gordon College, Rawalpindi, he captained the college tennis team, was judged the best overall English and Urdu debater, and also became the editor of the college magazine, "The Gordonian." He was later elected, unopposed, as the president of the college Minerva Club.

After graduation, he joined the Punjab University Law College, where he became president of PULC debating society, secretary of the Punjab University Law Society, and the editor of Law college's official magazine, "Al-Meezan". He was declared the best English debater of 1968 after winning the "Krishan Kishore Grover Goodwill Gold Medal Declamation Contest". Ramday graduated in 1968 with a top honours for best all round activities in academics, sports, and debates.

== Professional career ==
Ramday joined the legal profession at Lahore and enrolled as an advocate of the subordinate Courts in 1969. In 1971, he became an advocate of the High Court and in 1976 as an advocate of the Supreme Court. In April 1976, he was appointed Assistant Advocate General of the Punjab, was promoted to Additional Advocate General in 1984, and was finally appointed as the Advocate General in March 1987.

=== Judicial career ===
In October 1988, Justice Ramday was elevated to the bench of the Lahore High Court and was promoted to the judge of the Supreme Court of Pakistan in January 2002. He became famous for presiding over the bench in the Chief Justice of Pakistan Iftikhar Muhammad Chaudhry versus the Government of Pakistan in 2007.

On 3 November 2007, Chief of the Army declared emergency and issued a Provisional Constitutional Order (PCO). A seven panel Supreme Court bench headed by Chief Justice Iftikhar Muhammad Chaudhry declared the emergency as illegal. Justice Ramday, on principle, refused to take oath on PCO. He was declared to be not holding office of the justice any more. During the unrest that followed the imposition of emergency, he was placed under house arrest, making his grandson the youngest political prisoner in Pakistan's history.

Ramday was restored to the bench of Supreme Court on 17 March 2009 as a result of historic movement in his support that lasted for two years.

== Services ==
Ramday has remained a visiting assistant professor at the Punjab University Law College, Lahore and is a member of the visiting faculty of the Civil Services Academy of Pakistan and the National Institute of Public Administration (NIPA) at Lahore since 1982. He regularly delivers lectures at the National Defence University, Islamabad, the Administrative Staff College of Pakistan, the Naval War College and the Air Force War College of Pakistan. Outside of Pakistan, top universities including Harvard have invited him to deliver lectures to students of law.

He has also been on the board of governors of the Lahore University of Management Sciences (LUMS) and the Lahore School of Economics and has remained the chairperson of Shalamar Medical and Dental College (SMDC -LUMS). In addition, he has been a member of the syndicate of the Islamia University, Bahawalpur, and the Agriculture University, Faisalabad. He is a member of the board of governors of the Air University and the University of Modern Languages and Disciplines, Islamabad, and is a member of the syndicate of Quaid-e-Azam University, Islamabad.

In recognition of his services in the field of education especially the legal branch of education and the administration of justice, in May 2005, he was honoured with an honorary degree of Doctor of Laws by the Guru Nanak Dev University, Amritsar, which is rated amongst the top ten universities of India.

He honoured the Gurukul Kangri University at Haridwar in India, where he had been invited to talk about inter-faith harmony. On the same topic, he addressed the Rotary International South Asia Goodwill Summit, 2007 held at Delhi in February 2007.

Meanwhile, he has authored two books on Law of Evidence and Criminal Procedure which are set to be launched in May 2024. Lord Newberger who has served as President of the Supreme Court of the United Kingdom has expressed his intent to inaugurate Ramday's discourse.

== Ramday Trust ==
=== Ramday University ===
Ramday is building a university in the remote area of Thagas, Baltistan. Funded by Ramday Trust and other contributions, it will be the highest-altitude university globally at just under 11,000 ft. Prime minister Shehbaz Sharif inaugurated the university's groundbreaking in November 2024.

== Personal life ==
Ramday (Ramday is a sub caste of Arains) married the daughter of former Chief Justice of Pakistan Yaqoob Ali Khan, Quratulain Ramday. Quratulain was the chairperson of the Asia Chapter of Asia Pacific Cultural Center for UNESCO (ACCU) and the Punjab chapter of All Pakistan Women Association (APWA). She was also a member of the board of governors of Queen Mary College, Lahore. She died on Saturday, 9 January 2010, and was survived by her son, Mustafa and daughter, Aamena.

Mustafa is married to Aasma, daughter of Ch. Ahmad Saeed, who was the owner and chairman of Service Group of Pakistan, and former chairman of Pakistan International Airlines. Mustafa and Aasma have two sons named Asfandyar born on 15 January 2005, and Amnaan born on 3 August 2013. Asfandyar transferred from Aitchison College in 2018, matriculating from Marlborough College, a renowned British boarding school where he completed his O and A-Levels in 2023. Amnaan remains at Aitchison College, in Lahore. Mustafa, managing partner at Ramdays, is among the top lawyers of the country. He, like his father, remained a revered Advocate General for Punjab. Mustafa is also member Pakistan Cricket Board and of Aitchison College, Lahore.

Aamena is married to Muhammad Aurangzeb, son of Ramday's elder brother Ch. Farooq, twice the attorney general for Pakistan. Aamena and Aurangzeb have twin children, Dr. Ismaeel Aurangzeb and Jahan Ara Aurangzeb Khan, born on 5 January 1997. The twins graduated from University College London and King's College London, respectively. Aurangzeb is a graduate and MBA of the Wharton School of University of Pennsylvania. In an act of national service, with a push from Ramday, he gave up a lucrative salary of over Rs 300 million along with his Dutch nationality to serve as Federal Minister for Finance and Revenue after a rich banking career where he remained CEO of JP Morgan Asia Pacific and President and CEO of Habib Bank Limited. Apart from having been Chairman of both the Pakistan Business Council and the Pakistan Banks' Association, Aurangzeb is also the first and only Pakistani to be inducted into the Global CEO Council.

Ramday's late brother Ch. Farooq Ramday served twice as Attorney General for Pakistan under Pakistan Muslim League government. His nephew and Ch. Farooq Ramday's son, Muhammad Raza Farooq (late) was an LLM from Harvard University and also served as Advocate General for Punjab. Muhammad Raza Farooq died at a young age from a fatal heart attack in his Marriott hotel room in Islamabad, on Friday, 14 May 2010.

Brigadier Anwar-ul-Haq Ramday was also Ramday's nephew, who laid down his life in the terrorist attack on G.H.Q. Rawalpindi in 2009.

His elder brother Ch. Asad-ur-Rehman has been contesting elections for National Assembly as a candidate of Pakistan Muslim League since 1988 and also served as a federal minister.

Ramday's younger brother, Usman Mahmood, has spent his successful career working in the Middle-East, and is CEO of Zahid Group, and CEO of AJIL Financial Services Company.
