= Brijender Syal =

Indian sculptor and army officer

Capt Brijender Syal
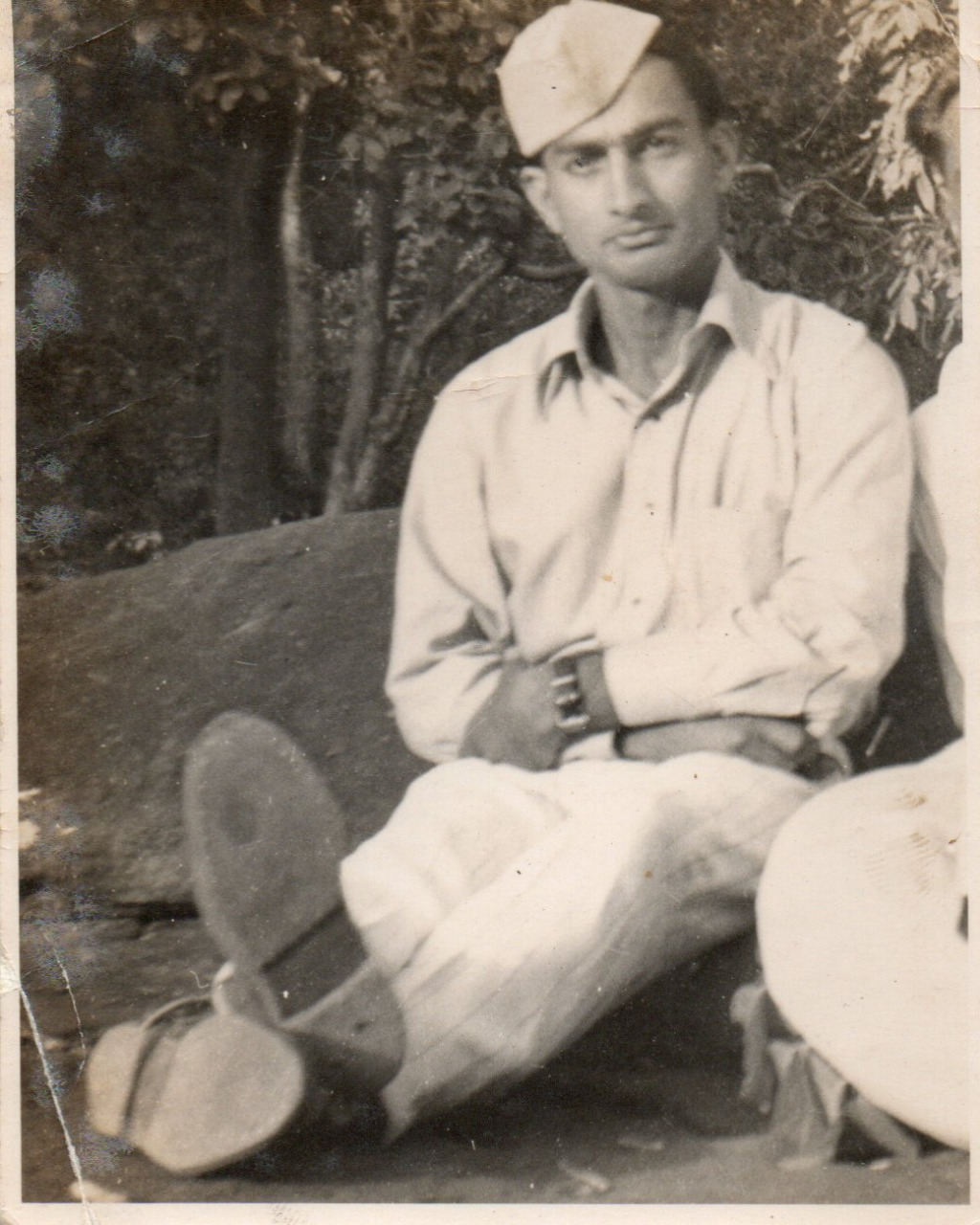
- Born: Brijender Singh Syal; January 10, 1920
- Died: January 7, 2001 (aged 80)
- Occupations: Sculptor, poet, army officer
- Known for: Stone sculptures inspired by Mirza Ghalib's poetry
- Notable work: Ghalib, a Hundred Moods (coffee table book)

Brijender Syal was an Indian sculptor and retired army officer renowned for his stone carvings interpreting and depicting the couplets of the 19th-century Urdu poet Mirza Ghalib. His exhibitions, particularly "Ghalib in Stone," and his collaboration with the Ghalib Academy in New Delhi brought him recognition for blending natural stone formations with Ghalib's verses.

== Early life and education ==
Syal exhibited a poetic inclination from his school days, deeply influenced by the works of Mirza Ghalib. During his college years at Dayal Singh College, Lahore, he actively participated in Urdu poetry competitions and won an inter-collegiate award in 1946. His passion for Urdu literature flourished during this period, laying the foundation for his later artistic interpretations of Ghalib's verses.

After graduating, Syal briefly pursued poetry, but his career trajectory shifted when he joined the Indian Army Education Corps.

== Career ==
Syal joined the Indian Army Education Corps and served until his retirement in 1975. During postings in remote areas, he collected stones and began sculpting, often humorously noted by colleagues. After retiring, he moved to Agra and dedicated himself to sculpting full-time, creating pieces inspired by Ghalib's poetry. His work gained prominence through exhibitions at the Ghalib Academy, including "Ghalib in Stone" (1978), featuring 60 carvings.

== Personal life ==
Syal married, but his wife died on 16 April 1971. Her death led him to abandon poetry and deepen his focus on sculpture. He later lived in Agra with his two daughters, one of whom became a poet and the other an artist.

== Literary contribution ==
In 1996, the Publications Division of India's Ministry of Information and Broadcasting released Ghalib, a Hundred Moods, a coffee table book featuring Syal's sculptures alongside Ghalib's verses. Syal described this as his "greatest honour."

Syal also contributed to academic efforts at the Ghalib Academy, which sought to “perpetuate Ghalib’s memory” through research and publications. His sculptures served as visual aids for scholars studying Ghalib's works, bridging poetic and artistic interpretation.

== Work on stones ==
Syal's sculptures used natural stones sourced from mountains and beaches, which he minimally altered to reflect Ghalib's themes of love and human suffering. His works are displayed in galleries, including a dedicated section in the Museum of the Ghalib Academy in New Delhi and the Rampur Raza Library in Uttar Pradesh. The gallery at the Ghalib Academy was inaugurated on December 23, 1983, by Mohammed Fazal, then a member of the Planning Commission to mark a triple anniversary event the 114th death anniversary of Mirza Ghalib, the 14th foundation day of the Ghalib academy and the 25th death anniversary of Maulana Abdul Kalam Azad. The event was attended by dignitaries such as Rajya Sabha member Najma Heptulla. He aimed to create 1,600 carvings but faced funding constraints. Notable works include:

- Being human: An insight of being human.

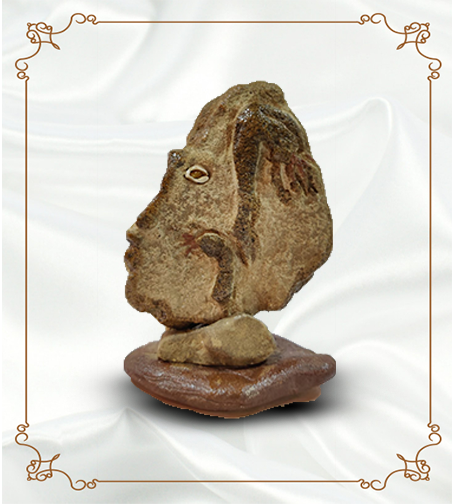
"Being Human" A stone sculpture based on a poem of Mirza Ghalib made by Captain Brijender Syal

- Panacea of Pain: A figure lost in mystical trance.

== Legacy and death ==
Syal planned to donate his works to the Raza Gallery in Rampur. His sculptures remain part of the Ghalib Museum's permanent collection. Brijender Syal died on January 7, 2001.
