= Najaf Abbas Sial =

Pakistani politician (1959–2018)

- نجف عباس سیال

Member of the National Assembly of Pakistan
- In office 1 June 2013 – 31 May 2018
- Constituency: NA-91 (Jhang-III)

Personal details
- Born: 22 May 1959
- Died: 11 November 2018 (aged 59) Jhang, Pakistan
- Party: Pakistan Muslim League (N)

Najaf Abbas Sial (Urdu: نجف عباس سیال; 22 May 1959 – 11 November 2018) was a Pakistani politician who was a member of the National Assembly of Pakistan from June 2013 to May 2018 and a Member of the Provincial Assembly of the Punjab from 2002 to 2013.

== Early life and education ==
Sial was born on 22 May 1959.

He did Bachelors of Arts from Government Emerson College, in Multan in 1978.

== Political career ==
He was elected to the Provincial Assembly of the Punjab as candidate of Pakistan Muslim League (Q) (PML-Q) from Constituency PP-83 (Jhang-XI) in the 2002 Pakistani general election. He received 28,742 votes and defeated an independent candidate, Talib Raza Khan Sial.

He was re-elected to the Provincial Assembly of the Punjab as candidate of PML-Q from Constituency PP-83 (Jhang-XI) in the 2008 Pakistani general election. He received 42,366 votes and defeated Muhammad Aoan Abbas, a candidate of Pakistan Muslim League (N) (PML-N).

He was elected to the National Assembly of Pakistan as an independent candidate from Constituency NA-91 (Jhang-III) in the 2013 Pakistani general election. He received 91,301 votes and defeated Muhammad Mehboob Sultan, a candidate of PML-N. He joined PML-N in May 2013.

== Death ==
He died on 11 November 2018 due to cardiac arrest in District Jhang.
