= Hiraj =

Sub-clan of the Sial tribe

The Hiraj or Haraj (Urdu: ہراج) are a sub-clan of the Sial tribe, mainly settled in the Kabirwala Tehsil of Khanewal district.

== Notable people with the surname ==
- Raza Hayat Hiraj
- Muhammad Akbar Hayat Hiraj
- Hamid Yar Hiraj
- Asghar Hayat Hiraj
- Amir Hayat Hiraj
