= Asad Ur Rehman =

Pakistani politician (born 1942)

Member of the National Assembly of Pakistan
- In office 1 June 2013 – 31 May 2018
- Constituency: NA-94 (Toba Tek Singh-III)

Personal details
- Born: 2 September 1942 (age 84)
- Other political affiliations: Pakistan Muslim League (N)
- Relations: Khalil-ur-Rehman Ramday (brother); Muhammad Aurangzeb (nephew)

Chaudhry Asad Ur Rehman Ramday (Urdu: چوہدری اسد الرحمٰن; born 2 September 1942) is a Pakistani politician who had been a member of the National Assembly of Pakistan, from 1988 to 1993, from 1997 to 1999 and again from June 2013 to May 2018.

== Early life and family ==
Ramday was born on 2 September 1942. His father, Chaudhry Muhammad Siddique Ramday, was a justice of the Lahore High Court. His brother Chaudhry Muhammad Farooq Ramday served as the Attorney-General for Pakistan on two occasions: first in caretaker ministry of Moeen Qureshi from July 1993 to August 1993, and later in the Second Nawaz Sharif ministry from April 1997 until he was removed following a military coup on 15 October 1999. Another brother, Khalil-ur-Rehman Ramday, served as a judge of the Supreme Court of Pakistan.

== Political career ==
He was elected to the National Assembly of Pakistan as a candidate for Islami Jamhoori Ittehad (IJI) for Constituency NA-71 (Toba Tek Singh) in the 1988 Pakistani general election. He received 65,430 votes and defeated Khalid Ahmad Khan, a candidate of Pakistan Peoples Party (PPP).

He was re-elected to the National Assembly as a candidate for IJI for Constituency NA-71 (Toba Tek Singh) in 1990 Pakistani general election. He received 65,540 votes and defeated Javed Ahmad Khan, a candidate of Pakistan Democratic Alliance (PDA).

He ran for the seat of the National Assembly as a candidate for Pakistan Muslim League (N) (PML-N) for Constituency NA-71 (Toba Tek Singh) in the 1993 Pakistani general election but was unsuccessful. He received 57,43 votes and lost the seat to Khalid Ahmad Khan Kharal, a candidate of PPP.

He was re-elected to the National Assembly as a candidate for PML-N for Constituency NA-71 (Toba Tek Singh) in the 1997 Pakistani general election. He received 77,777 votes and defeated Khalid Ahmad Khan Kharal, a candidate of PPP.

He served as federal minister of state.

He ran for the seat of the National Assembly as a candidate of PML-N from Constituency NA-94 (Toba Tek Singh-III) in the 2002 Pakistani general election, but was unsuccessful. He received 44,942 votes and lost the seat to Riaz Fatyana.

He ran for the seat of the National Assembly as a candidate of PML-N from Constituency NA-94 (Toba Tek Singh-III) in the 2008 Pakistani general election, but was unsuccessful. He received 59,284 votes and lost the seat to Riaz Fatyana.

He was re-elected to the National Assembly on a candidate of PML-N from Constituency NA-94 (Toba Tek Singh-III) in the 2013 Pakistani general election. He received 103,581 votes and defeated Riaz Fatyana.

He ran as the candidate of PML-N from Constituency NA-94 (Toba Tek Singh-III) in the 2024 Pakistani general election. He received 77,455 votes and lost the seat to Riaz Fatyana of PTI.
