= Riaz Fatyana =

Pakistani politician

Member of the National Assembly of Pakistan
- Incumbent
- Assumed office 29 February 2024
- Constituency: NA-107 Toba Tek Singh-III
- In office 13 August 2018 – 25 January 2023
- Preceded by: Asad Ur Rehman
- Constituency: NA-113 (Toba Tek Singh-III)
- In office 16 November 2002 – 16 March 2013
- Constituency: NA-94 Toba Tek Singh-III

Personal details
- Born: 18 January 1958 (age 68) Kamalia, Punjab, Pakistan
- Party: PTI (2013-present)
- Other political affiliations: PML(Q) (2013-2013); IND (2002-2013)
- Education: University of the Punjab

Riaz Fatyana (born 18 January 1958 in Kamalia, Punjab, Pakistan) is a Pakistani politician who has been a member of the National Assembly of Pakistan since February 2024 and previously served in this position from August 2018 to January 2023 and 16 November 2002 to 16 March 2013.

== Personal life ==
Riaz Fatyana is a psychologist by profession. He obtained his B.A. Hons. Political Science and MSc.Applied Psychology degrees from University of the Punjab in 1979 and 1983 respectively, followed by an LL.B degree from University of Sindh in 1985.

== Political career ==
Fatyana changed political parties often, joining parties likely to come to power. He started his career by being elected as a member of provincial assembly on a ticket from Pakistan Muslim League-N. Later he was elected a member of National Assembly on a ticket of Pakistan Muslim League (Q) from NA-94 (Toba Tek Singh). Fatyana in 2013 quit the Pakistan Muslim League (Q) due to conflict with Chaudhry Prevez Elahi and other party leaders. Fatyana was elected for 3 terms as Member of the Punjab Provincial Assembly 1988–1990, Punjab Provincial Assembly 1990–1993 and Punjab Provincial Assembly 1993–1996. He is a former member National Assembly, and he was a Chairman of National Assembly Standing Committee on human rights as well as Parliamentarians Commission for Human Rights. He served as President of the Pakistan Psychologists Association and Senior Deputy Chief Commissioner of Pakistan Boy Scouts Association. He also served in the All Pakistan Muslim League Student Federation. He has also served as the Provincial Minister of Education, Finance and information Punjab. In 2013 elections he was elected as an independent candidate. In January 2015 Riaz Fatyana joined Pakistan Tehreek-e-Insaf (PTI).

Riaz Fatyana was nominated as a candidate of PTI from NA-113 (Toba Tek Singh-III) and he contested against PML-N's rival Asad Ur Rehman and won the seat.

He served as the member of NACTA and Convener Taskforce On Sustainable Development Goals Pakistan, Chairman National Assembly Standing Committee on Law & Justice Pakistan, Member Public Accounts Committee/ Convener Sub Committee. Fatyana has been accused of making vilifying remarks about federal cabinet members.

He was re-elected to the National Assembly in the 2024 Pakistani general election from NA-107 Toba Tek Singh-III as an independent candidate supported by PTI. He received 129,971 votes and defeated Asad Ur Rehman, a candidate of PML(N).

== See also ==
- List of members of the 15th National Assembly of Pakistan
