= Ghulam Bibi Bharwana =

Pakistani politician

- غلام بی بی بھروانہ

Member of the National Assembly of Pakistan
- In office 13 August 2018 – 10 August 2023
- Constituency: NA-115 (Jhang-II)
- In office 1 June 2013 – 31 May 2018
- Constituency: NA-88 (Jhang-III)
- In office 18 November 2002 – 31 May 2013
- Constituency: NA-87 (Jhang-II)

Personal details
- Born: 5 May 1970 (age 56)
- Party: IPP (2025-present)
- Other political affiliations: PTI (2018-2023)
- Parent: Saleem Bibi Bharwana (mother)

Ghulam Bibi Bharwana (Urdu: غلام بی بی بھروانہ; born 5 May 1970) is a Pakistani politician who had been a member of the National Assembly of Pakistan from August 2018 till August 2023. Previously she was a member of the National Assembly from 2002 to 31 May 2018.

== Early life ==
She was born on 5 May 1970.

She received her Bachelor of Arts degree from Lahore College for Women and the Bachelor of Laws degree from the University of Punjab.

== Political career ==
She was elected to the National Assembly of Pakistan as a candidate of Pakistan Muslim League (Q) (PML-Q) from Constituency NA-87 (Jhang-II) in the 2002 Pakistani general election. She served as Minister of State for Education.

She was re-elected to the National Assembly as a candidate of PML-Q from Constituency NA-87 (Jhang-II) in the 2008 Pakistani general election.

She was re-elected to the National Assembly as a candidate of Pakistan Muslim League (N) from Constituency NA-88 (Jhang-III) in the 2013 Pakistani general election. She announced to resign from her National Assembly seat in protest in December 2017.

In May 2018, she quit PML-N and joined Pakistan Tehreek-e-Insaf (PTI).

She was re-elected to the National Assembly as a candidate of PTI from NA-115 (Jhang-II) in the 2018 Pakistani general election.

She is running for a seat in the Provincial Assembly of the Punjab from PP-126 Jhang-III as a candidate of the PTI in the 2024 Punjab provincial election.
