= PP-212 Khanewal-VIII =

Constituency of the Punjabi Provincial Legislature, Pakistan

- Constituency for the Provincial Assembly of Punjab
- Region: Kabirwala Tehsil (partly) including Kabirwala city of Khanewal District

Current constituency
- Created from: PP-213 Khanewal-II (2002-2018); PP-204 Khanewal-II (2018-2023)

PP-212 Khanewal-VIII (پی پی-212، خانیوال-8) is a Constituency of Provincial Assembly of Punjab.

== General elections 2024 ==
Provincial election 2024: PP-212 Khanewal-VIII
Party	Candidate	Votes	%	±%
Independent	Muhammad Asghar Hayat Haraj	42,347	33.58	
Independent	Syed Hussain Jahania Gardezi	38,112	30.22	
Independent	Ghulam Murtaza (Note: Filed nomination papers as PTI candidate ECP allowed him to run as an independent)	12,331	9.78	
PPP	Rubina Hamid Abbas Gardezi	10,174	8.07	
PML(N)	Irfan Ahmad	9,234	7.32	
JUI (F)	Muhammad Ahmad Anwar	8,384	6.65	
TLP	Noaman Jabbar	2,236	1.77	
Others	Others (thirteen candidates)	3,285	2.61	
Turnout		130,064	56.81	
Total valid votes		126,103	96.95	
Rejected ballots		3,961	3.05	
Majority		4,235	3.36	
Registered electors		228,930		
hold				

== General elections 2018 ==
Provincial election 2018: PP-204 Khanewal-II
Party	Candidate	Votes	%	±%
Independent	Syed Hussain Jahanian Gardezi	51,074	45.91	
PTI	Abbas Zafar Haraj	33,042	29.70	
PML(N)	Irfan Ahmad	18,301	16.45	
PPP	Muhammad Naheed	3,474	3.12	
Independent	Malik Muhammad Ashraf	2,534	2.28	
JUI (F)	Abdul Majeed Anwar	605	0.54	
Others	Others (nine candidates)	2,217	2.00	
Turnout		114,318	57.79	
Total valid votes		111,247	97.31	
Rejected ballots		3,071	2.69	
Majority		18,032	16.21	
Registered electors		197,812		

== General elections 2013 ==
Provincial election 2013: PP-213 Khanewal-II
Party	Candidate	Votes	%	±%
Independent	Hussain Jahania Gardezi	36,616	40.03	
PML(N)	Rana Irfan Ahmad	34,101	37.28	
PTI	Shahbaz Ahmad Khan	7,922	8.66	
PPP	Haji Qasim Raza	5,044	5.51	
MDM	Muhammad Abdul Rahman Jami	4,721	5.16	
Independent	Asad Abbas Shah Bukhari	1,374	1.50	
SIC	Shokat Ali	361	0.39	
Others	Others (fifteen candidates)	1,343	1.47	
Turnout		95,063	59.74	
Total valid votes		91,482	96.23	
Rejected ballots		3,581	3.77	
Majority		2,515	2.75	
Registered electors		159,132		

== General elections 2008 ==
Contesting candidates	Party affiliation	Votes polled

== See also ==
- PP-211 Khanewal-VII
- PP-213 Multan-I
