= Mohri Pur =

Town in Punjab, Pakistan with historical significance

Coordinates: 30°31′06″N 71°53′10″E

- Town
- Etymology: Baba Mohri
- Nickname: Mohri Wala
- Interactive map of Mohri Pur
- Country: Pakistan
- District: Khanewal
- Tehsil: Kabirwala
- Founder: Baba Mohri

Area
  - Total: 10 km^{2} (3.9 sq mi)

Dimensions
  - Length: 4 km (2.5 mi)
  - Width: 4 km (2.5 mi)

Population (2013)
  - Estimate: 18,000−25,000
- Time zone: GMT+5
  - Summer (DST): PST GMT+5
- Postal code: 58250
- Website: https://www.facebook.com/mohripur/

Mohri Pur is a town situated in Kabirwala Tehsil, Khanewal District in southern Punjab, Pakistan. It is named after a person named "Baba Mohri", who first came to the area long ago.

Before the 1947 partition of India, besides Muslims, some Hindus, and followers of other faiths lived in Mohri Pur, but since the creation of Pakistan only Muslims have lived there. The population was approximately 18,000-25,000 at the end of 2017. The town has some private facilities, including schools and medical clinics. The literacy rate is more than 50%, higher in neighbouring areas. Most youth have at least a high school education.

In the past 20 years, the Hiraj and Syed Group has controlled local politics. Mohri Pur is one of the few areas of Pakistan where females are not permitted to vote. One lady attempted to vote in May 2013; she received admiration from the media but criticism from the locals. Continued infighting and feuding has killed many young people in the town, though villagers have tried to stamp out violence.
