= Kohiwala =

- Village
- Location within Punjab, Pakistan Location within Pakistan
- Coordinates: 30°20′55″N 71°46′19″E
- Country: Pakistan
- Province: Punjab
- District: Khanewal

Population
  - Total: 16,677

Kohiwala is a village in Khanewal district of Punjab, Pakistan approximately 10 km from Kabirwala.
