= Makhdoom Pur Pahuran =

Makhdum Pur Pahuran مخدوم پور پہوڑاں
- Location in Pakistan
- Coordinates: 30.461°N 72.041°E

Population (2023)
  - Total: 29,065

Makhdum Pur Pahuran (Urdu: مخدُوم پُور پہوڑاں), is an ancient town in the district of Khanewal, Punjab, Pakistan. This city is situated between Tulamba and Kabirwala.

The specialty of this city is making bedsheets and clothes of various kinds. This city has five main bazars, a railway station, bus station, municipal office, health clinic, police station and post office. Gurdwara Makhdoom Pur Pahoran is a religious place for Sikhs.

== Demographics ==
80% of the population speak the Jhangvi dialect Rajputi of Punjabi and Urdu Ranghari. Some people also speak English.

== Education ==
Almost 60% of the younger generation is educated. There are several schools and colleges in Makhdoom Pur Pahuran.

== Religion ==
The population is predominantly Muslim and there are several mosques in the town. After the independence of Pakistan in 1947, the minority Hindus and Sikhs migrated to India while many Muslims refugees from India settled in Makhdoom Pur Pahuran.

According to legends, Sikh founder Guru Nanak visited the Makhdoom Pur Pahuran and Gurdwara Makhdoom Pur Pahoran located in the city. The gurdwara has now been transformed to a school.

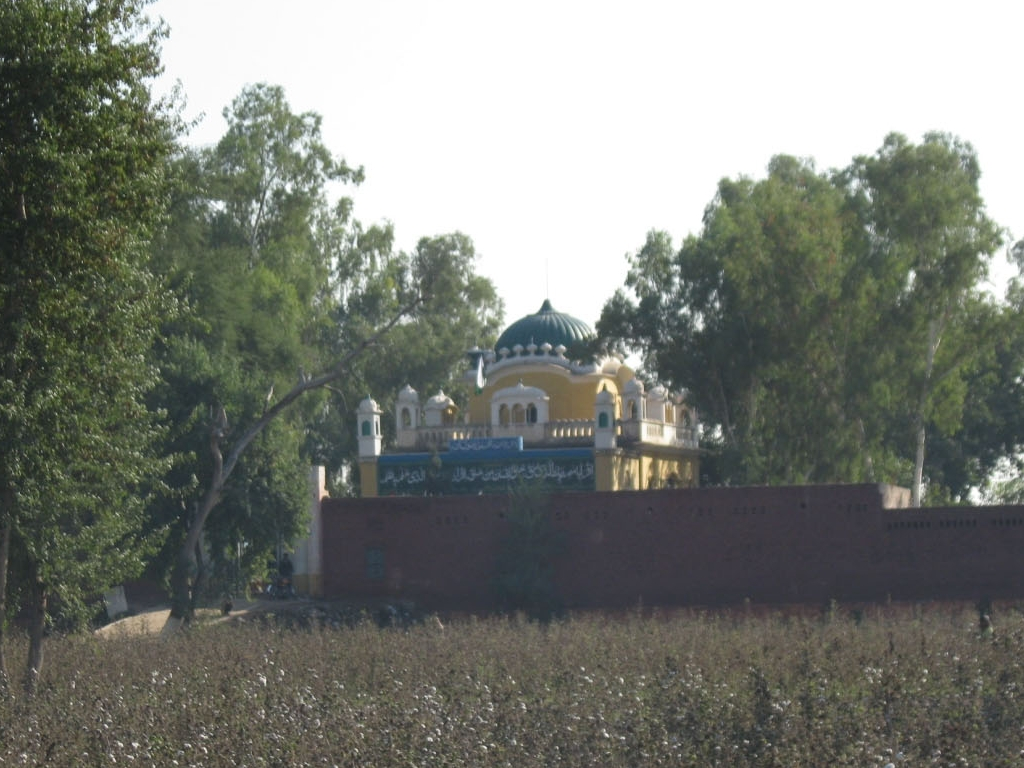
Gurdwara Makhdoom Pur Pahoran
