= Komal Joya =

Pakistani Urdu poetess

- کومل جوئیہ
- Born: Shaziya Ali; 9 November 1983 (age 43); Kabirwala, Punjab, Pakistan
- Occupation: Poetess
- Writing career
- Language: Urdu
- Genre: Ghazal
- Notable works: Aisa Lagta Hai Tujhko Kho Dungi (2013); Haath Pe Aayi Dastak (2022)

Komal Joya (Urdu: کومل جوئیہ; born on 9 November 1983) is a contemporary Pakistani Urdu poetess.

Komal Joya was born as Shaziya Ali on 9 November 1983 in Kabirwala, Khanewal District, Punjab, Pakistan. She completed her early education in her hometown and began writing poetry during her school years.
