= Gurdwara Makhdoom Pur Pahoran =

- گردوارہ مخدوم پور پہوڑاں
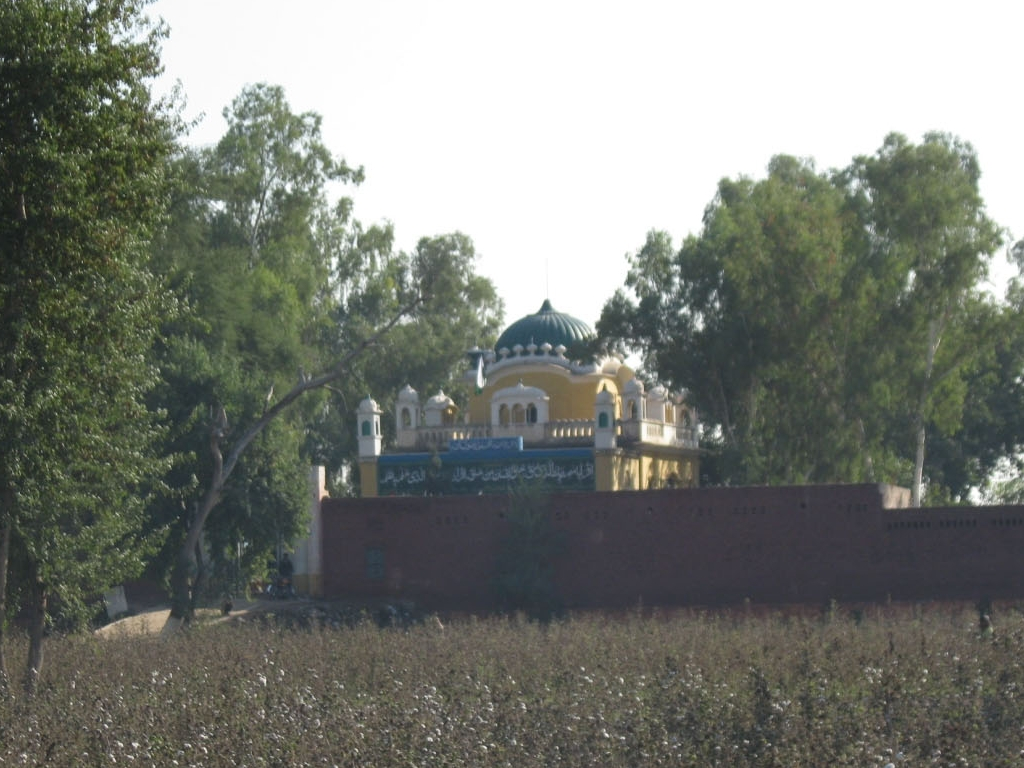
- Gurdwara Makhdoom Pur Pahoran

- Location in Pakistan

General information
- Type: Gurdwara
- Coordinates: 30.45307°N 72.04903°E

Gurdwara Makhdoom Pur Pahoran also commonly known as Gurdwara Tulamba Sahib, (Punjabi: گردوارہ مخدوم پور پہوڑاں) is a gurdwara situated at Makhdoom Pur Pahoran, a town between Tulamba and Kabirwala.

== History ==
A narrative tells that Guru Nanak set out from Pakpattan and reached a place near Tulamba where Sajjan Thug had set up a trap in the form of a caravan inn. He used to rob the travellers and made an attempt to trap Guru Nanak but failed. Guru Nanak created this Shabd here; Bronze is bright and shiny, but when it is rubbed, its blackness appears. Washing it, its impurity is not removed, even if it is washed a hundred times. Hearing this Shabd, Sajjan became a friend of Guru. Sajjan's inn was converted into a Gurdwara to commemorate this event.

Bhai Jodh Singh, disciple and Army General (Battle of Gurusar) of Sat Guru Har Gobind Ji was a resident of this village; this Gurdwara was built by one of his descendants in Samvat 1970. Following the partition in 1947, a new gurdwara was set up in Panipat Haryana by his descendants (Bhayana clan).

== Status ==
The boundary of the gurdwara runs around in area of two ghumaon with Gurasthan at its centre: There used to be a big pool (made of marble) west of it that has now been filled with soil and levelled. Rooms for the stay of Sangat have been built along the boundary wall. There are green trees, plants and flowers all around. At present, Govt Higher Secondary School is housed in this building and Gurasthan is made the principal's office. In May 5th.2026 Gruasthan is evacuated and office is shifted in a new office room to maintain the religious respect. The inner design of the dome is still the same as it was centuries ago and so are the tiles of the floor, yet other walls and buildings are regularly whitewashed.
