= Sarai Sidhu =

City in Punjab, Pakistan

Sarai Sidhu سرائے سِدُھو
- City
- Location in Pakistan Sarai Sidhu (Pakistan)
- Coordinates: 30°33′0″N 72°1′58″E
- Country: Pakistan
- Province: Punjab
- District: Khanewal
- Tehsil: Kabirwala
- Union councils: 3

Government
  - Type: Municipality

Population (2023)
  - Total: 49,860
- Time zone: UTC+5 (PKT)
  - Summer (DST): UTC+6 (PDT)
- Postal code: 58190

Sarai Sidhu (Punjabi: سرائے سِدُھو, Urdu: سرائے سِدُھو) is a village in Kabirwala Tehsil, Khanewal District of the Punjab province of Pakistan. It is located at the bank of Ravi River.

== Location ==
Sarai Sidhu's geographical coordinates are 30°33'0" North, 72°1'58" East. It is located 2 km from the Ravi River and 18 km north of the Abdul Hakeem.

== Colleges and schools ==
- Govt. Associate College, Sarai Sidhu
- Govt. Associate College for Women, Sarai Sidhu
- Govt High School, Sarai Sidhu
