= Mahni Sial =

- Village
- Location within Punjab, Pakistan Location within Pakistan
- Coordinates: 30°17′23″N 71°47′10″E
- Country: Pakistan
- Province: (Punjab, Pakistan) Punjab
- District: Khanewal
- Division (Tehsil): Kabirwala

Government
  - Chairman: Elections to be Held
- Elevation: 128 m (420 ft)
- Time zone: UTC+5 (PST)
- Area code: +92
- National Constituency: NA-151
- Provisional Constituency: PP-218

Mahni Sial (Urdu: ماہنی سیال) is a village and union council in Kabirwala Tehsil, Khanewal District, Punjab, Pakistan. It is located close to Khanewal-Multan Highway.

A civilian and a soldier killed during the 2025 Indian aggression against Pakistan were buried in Mahni Sial and 8-Kassi Kot Molchand areas.
