= Raipur, Pakistan =

Raipur رائے پور
- village
- Location of Raipur in Punjab, Pakistan Raipur (Pakistan)
- Coordinates: 30°30′10″N 71°55′30″E
- Country: Pakistan
- Pakistan: Punjab
- District: Khanewal
- Tehsil: Kabirwala

Raipur (Urdu: رائے پُور), (Punjabi: رائے پور) is a village in the Kabirwala Tehsil of Khanewal District in Punjab, Pakistan. It is famous as the birthplace of Indian American Nobel Laureate Har Gobind Khorana.

== Geography ==
The village is situated in the Kabirwala Tehsil, Khanewal District in the Punjab, Pakistan, having the average elevation of 128 metres.
