= Kot Islam =

Kot Islam is a sub-tehsil in Khanewal District, Punjab, Pakistan located on the main Jhang-Multan Road. Its old name was Mansa Manglani. Its surrounding areas are Bagar Sargana, Abdul Hakeem, Qatal Pur and 25 Pul. Ch Rafique Arain is the chairman and Mehar Ali Hiraj the vice-chairman of Kot Islam union council. In this sub-tehsil, there are Govt Girls and boys high school, a sports ground. River Ravi is also located in the area. The main population consists of the main clans i.e Sial, Sahu, Arain, Qureshi, Mughal, etc. However other clans like Bhatti, Khokhar and Rajput are also prominent. Kot Islam was included in NA-150 after new delimitation of constituencies by the Election Commission of Pakistan. People of Kot Islam have been demanding a post office, colleges for boys and girls, a hospital of a minimum of 50 beds, water filtration plant, a technical college and other basic facilities.
