= PP-210 Khanewal-VI =

Constituency of the Punjabi Provincial Legislature, Pakistan

- Constituency for the Provincial Assembly of Punjab
- Region: Jahanian Tehsil of Khanewal District

Current constituency
- Created from: PP-219 Khanewal-VIII (2002-2018); PP-210 Khanewal-VIII (2018-2023)

PP-210 Khanewal-VI (پی پی-210، خانیوال-6) is a Constituency of Provincial Assembly of Punjab.

== General elections 2024 ==
Provincial election 2024: PP-210 Khanewal-VI
Party	Candidate	Votes	%	±%
Independent	Khalid Javed (Note: Filed nomination papers as PTI candidate but ECP allowed him to run as an Independent)	54,680	39.82	
PML(N)	Atta Ur Rehman	47,343	34.48	
IPP	Karam Dad Wahla	19,427	14.15	
TLP	Alamgir	8,700	6.34	
Others	Others (ten candidates)	7,171	5.21	
Turnout		139,355	57.76	
Total valid votes		137,321	98.54	
Rejected ballots		2,034	1.46	
Majority		7,337	5.34	
Registered electors		241,249		
hold				

== General elections 2018 ==
Provincial election 2018: PP-210 Khanewal-VIII
Party	Candidate	Votes	%	±%
PML(N)	Atta Ur Rahman	48,923	40.26	
PTI	Khalid Javed	45,651	37.57	
Independent	Karam Dad Wahla	23,097	19.01	
TLP	Ghulam Mustafa	2,863	2.36	
Others	Others (five candidates)	988	0.82	
Turnout		123,306	61.72	
Total valid votes		121,522	98.55	
Rejected ballots		1,784	1.45	
Majority		3,272	2.69	
Registered electors		199,777		

== General elections 2013 ==
Provincial election 2013: PP-219 Khanewal-VIII
Party	Candidate	Votes	%	±%
PML(N)	Karam Dad Wahla	46,986	48.54	
PTI	Mian Javed Jahanian	34,333	35.47	
Independent	Rana Fiaz Ahmed	6,940	7.17	
PPP	Jawad Aslam Randhawa	3,068	3.17	
MQM-P	Iftikhar Akbar Randhawa	2,996	3.10	
Independent	Pervaiz Hameed	1,020	1.05	
Others	Others (eleven candidates)	1,447	1.49	
Turnout		99,122	62.73	
Total valid votes		96,790	97.65	
Rejected ballots		2,332	2.35	
Majority		12,653	13.07	
Registered electors		158,016		

== General elections 2008 ==
Contesting candidates	Party affiliation	Votes polled

== See also ==
- PP-209 Khanewal-V
- PP-211 Khanewal-VII
