= Tomb of Shah Rukn-e-Alam =

14th-century monument in Multan, Pakistan

- مقبرۂ شاہ رکن عالم
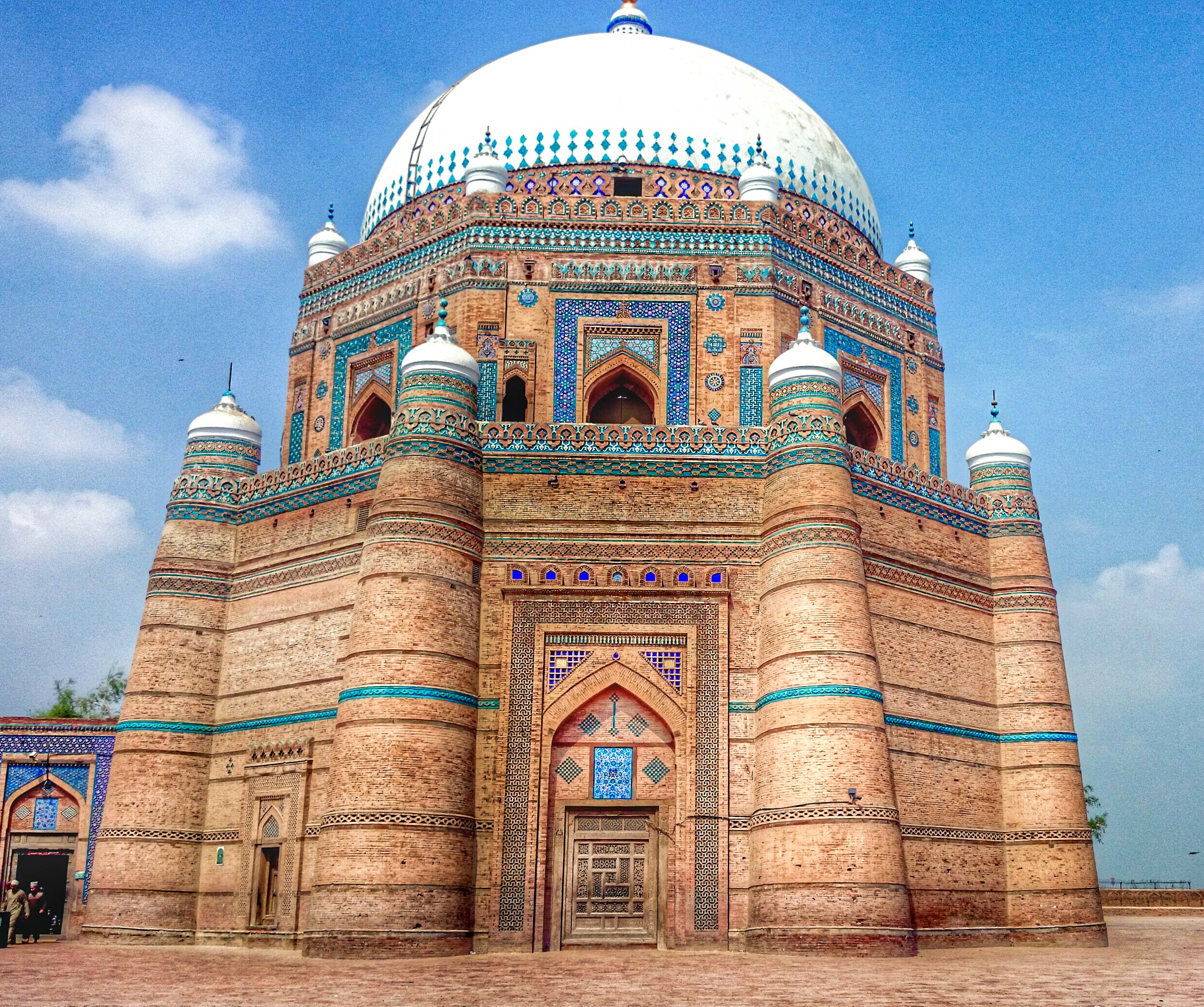
- The shrine of Rukn-e-Alam is one of southern Punjab's most important Sufi shrines
- Interactive map of Tomb of Shah Rukn-e-Alam
- Location: Multan, Punjab, Pakistan
- Coordinates: 30°11′56″N 71°28′17″E
- Type: Sufi shrine
- Completion date: 1324 CE

The tomb of Shah Rukn-e-Alam is the mausoleum of the 14th century Sufi saint Shah Rukn-e-Alam located in Multan, Punjab, Pakistan, at the northwestern edge of the Multan Fort. The shrine is considered to be the earliest example of Tughluq architecture, and is one of the most impressive shrines in the Indian subcontinent. The shrine attracts over 100,000 pilgrims to the annual urs festival that commemorates his death.

== History ==
The mausoleum was built between 1320 and 1324 CE by Ghiyath al-Din Tughluq in the pre-Mughal architectural style. The tomb is considered the earliest example of Tughluq architecture, and pre-dates Tughluq monuments in Delhi.

The tomb was built when Ghiyath al-Din served as governor of Dipalpur, and likely was intended to serve as a tomb for himself, before he became Emperor of the Delhi Sultanate. Rukn-e-Alam had initially been buried in the Shrine of Bahauddin Zakariya, however, the present tomb was gifted by Muhammad bin Tughluq to the descendants of Rukn-e-Alam, who had his remains interred in the shrine in 1330.

== Layout ==
The shrine's layout is typical of Suhrawadi tombs, with three entrances, a western-facing mihrab, and an original main entrance on the southern axis that featured a small vestibule. The main entrance has since been shifted to the east, in an attempt to align the shrine's axes with Mecca, in accordance with orthodox interpretations of Islam.

== Architecture ==
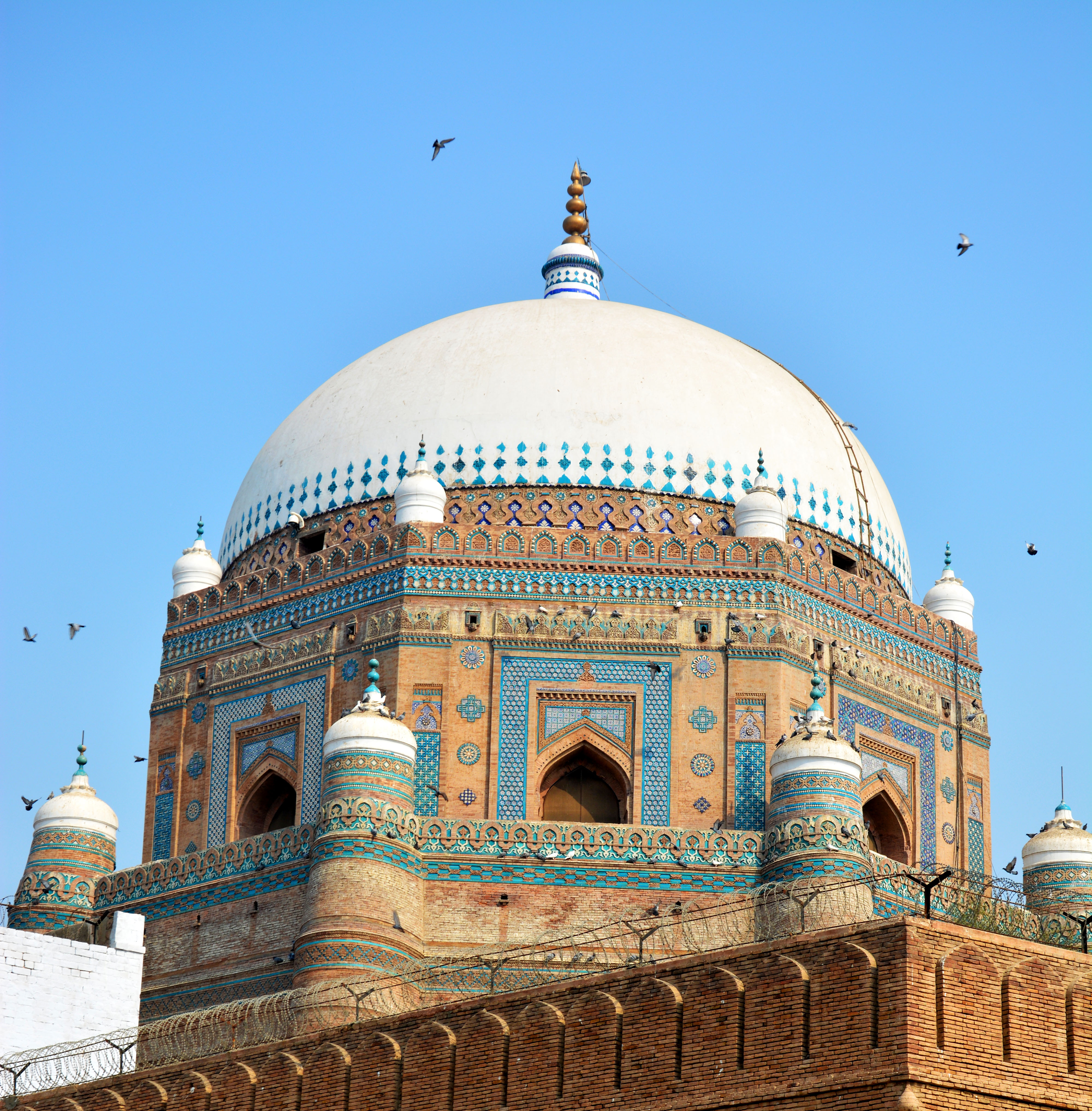
The mausoleum features buttresses in each of its 8 corners, and incorporates elements of Tughluq military architecture.

The shrine represents the culmination of Multani funerary architecture that began with the Shrine of Khalid Walid near Kabirwala.

=== Mausoleum ===
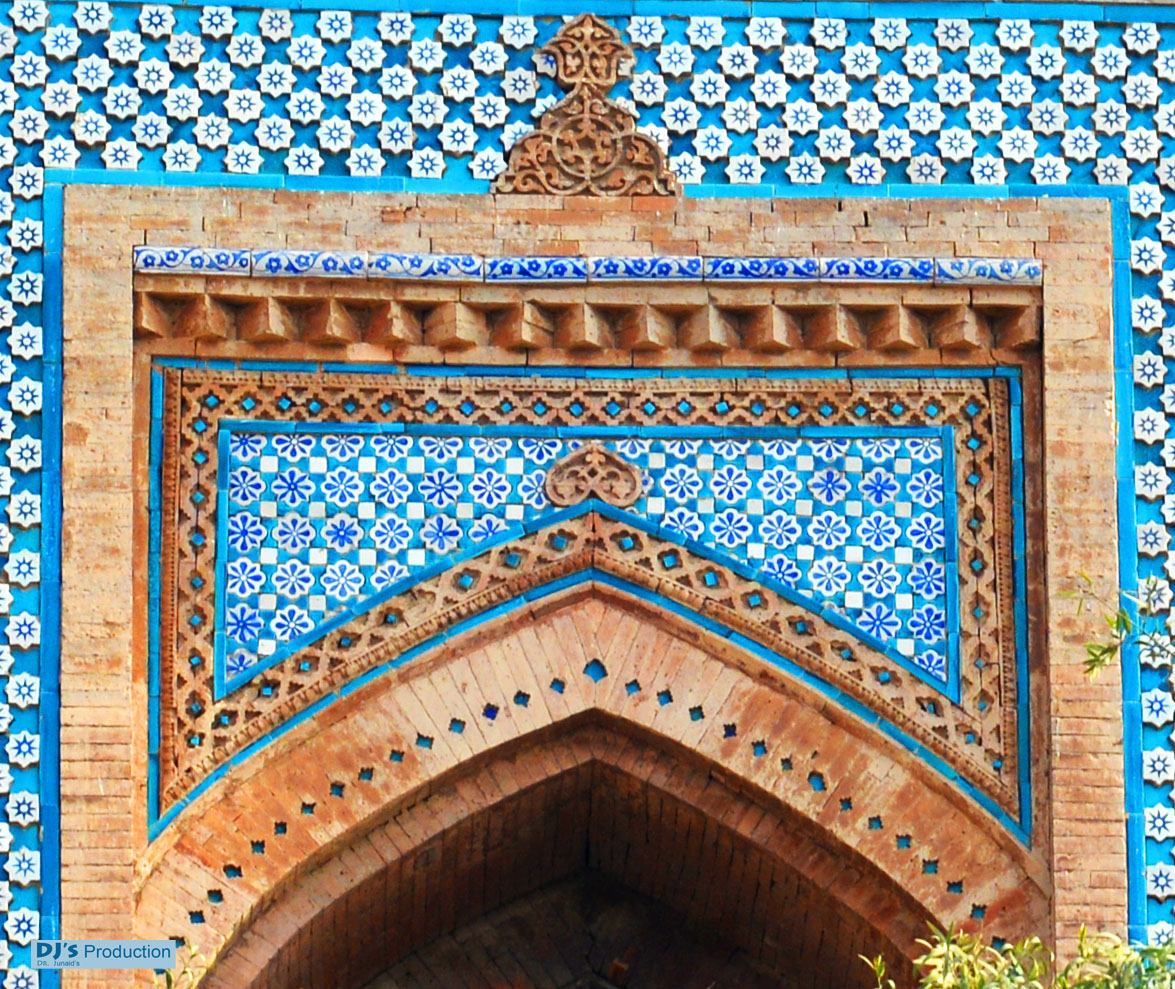
The masuoleum decorative elements.

The mausoleum is a three-tiered structure. Though the second octagonal tier is typical of Multan, the first tier in the shape of an octagon differs from the nearby Shrine of Bahauddin Zakariya and other earlier shrines which rests upon a square shaped base.

The first tier is 15 metres in diameter, and features walls 4 feet thick. The first tier features bands of timber that create a visual break in the exterior brickwork. The octagonal first tier is buttressed by small minaret-shaped towers in each of its 8 corners that provide support to the structure, and narrow as they rise and surpass the height of the first tier.

A second octagon rests upon the first tier that features small domes in each of the eight corners of the building. A third tier rests above the second, and is formed by a dome of 15 meters in diameter. The entire structure is 35 meters tall, with sloping walls. The dome is capped by a structure similar to an amalaka found on Hindu temples.

=== Decorative elements ===
The mausoleum is built entirely of red brick, bounded with beams of shisham wood, which have turned black over the centuries. The exterior is elaborately ornamented with carved wooden panels, carved brick, string-courses and battlements. Buttresses, turrets, and crenellations at the top of the shrine reflect the influence of Tughluq military architecture on even non-military buildings.

The exterior is further embellished with regional-style tile-work in floral, arabesque, and geometric motifs with dark blue, azure, and white tiles - all of which contrast the deep red finely polished bricks. The white dome is decorated with blue tile-work along its lower perimeter.

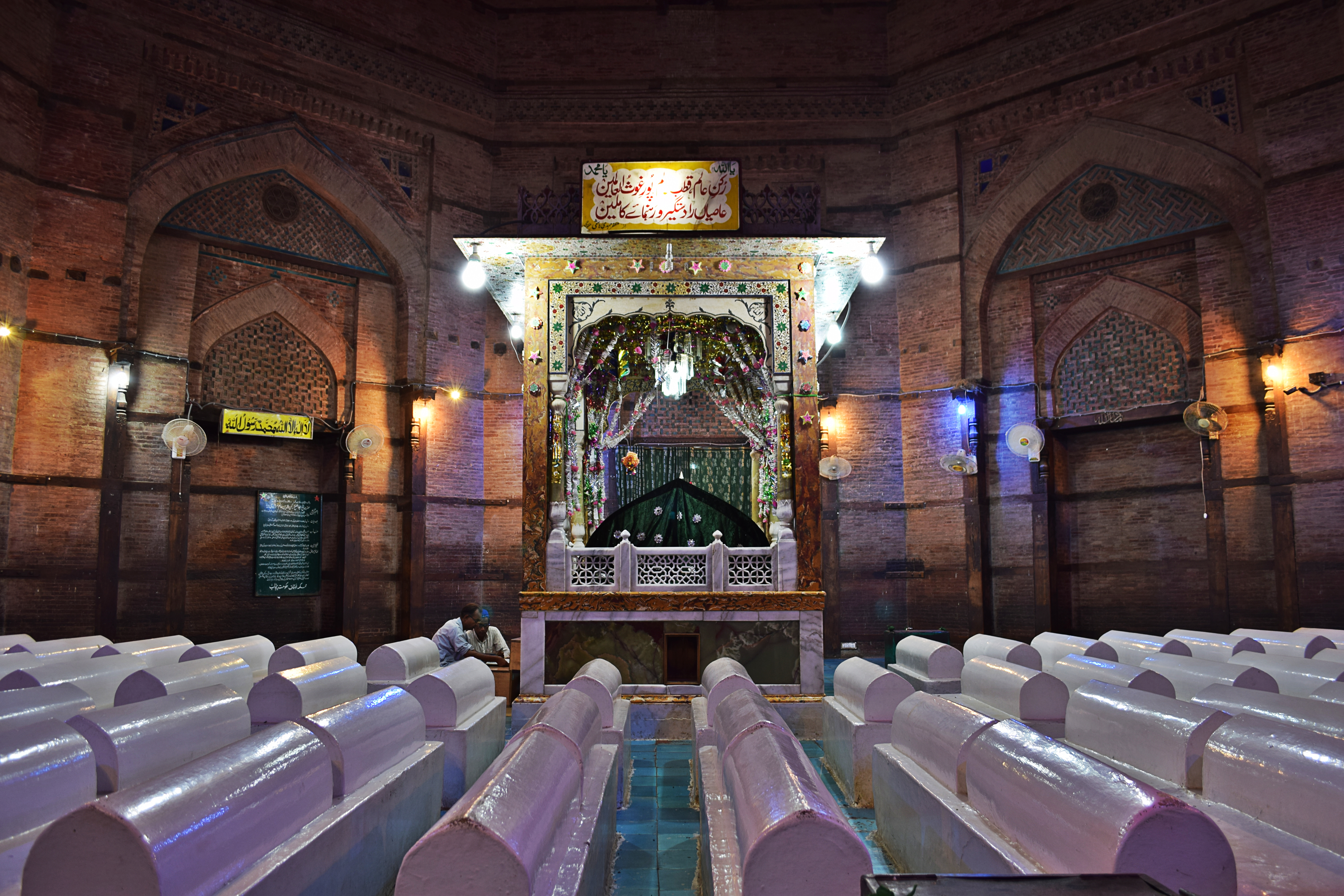
Shah Rukn-e-Alam's grave is surrounded by 72 graves of his descendants and devotees.

=== Interior ===
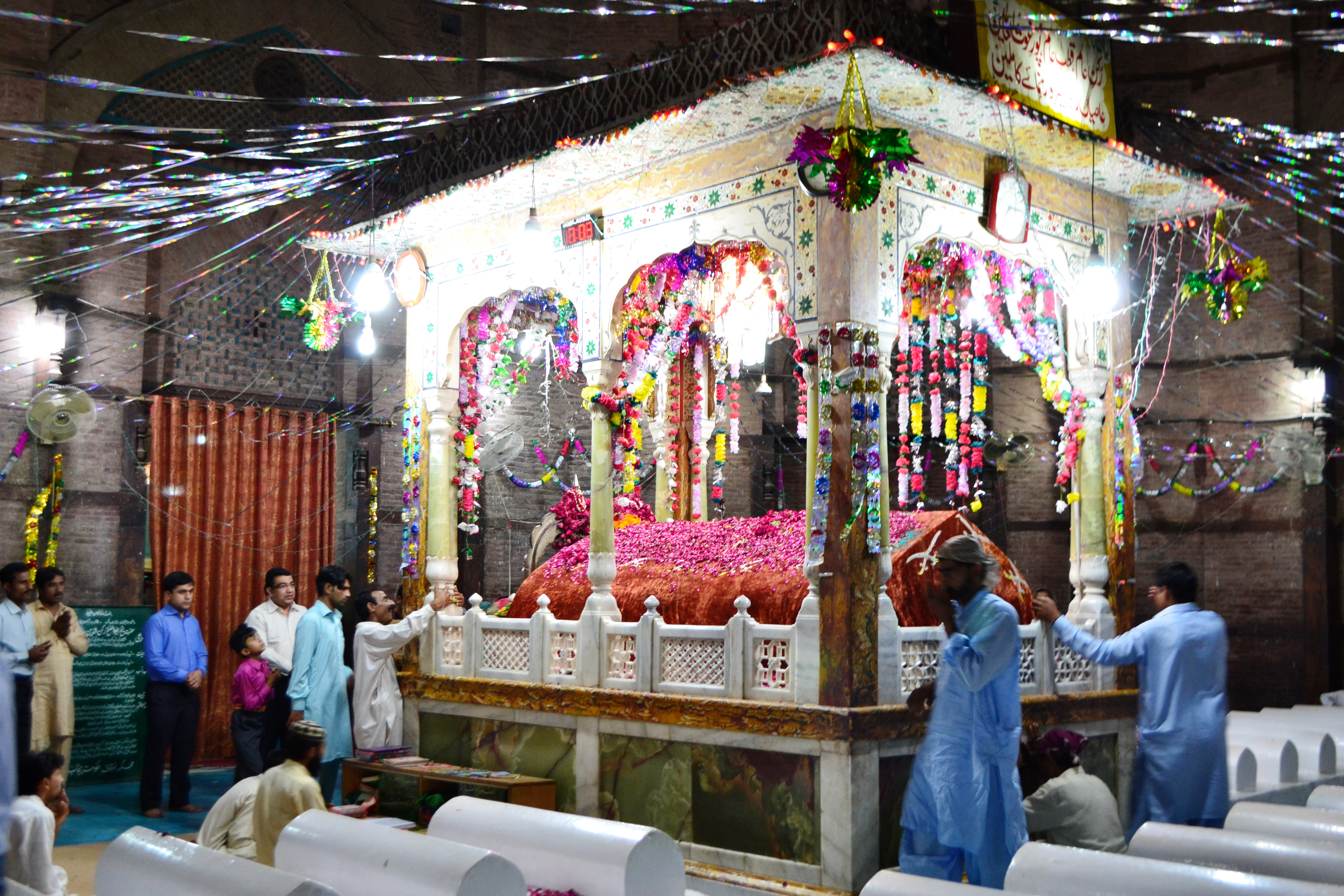
Inside the Shrine of Shah Rukn-e-Alam

The shrine's vast interior features no internal buttresses, nor any interior structural elements to support the interior space, which results in a vast interior space. The interior was initially decorated with elaborate tile work, which was subsequently covered in plaster, though the vast interior of the mausoleum is now largely bare. Niches at the ground level serve to enlarge the interior space further.

The carved wooden mihrab is considered to be one of the earliest examples of its genre. The sarcophagus of Rukn-e-Alam is slightly off-centre, and is surrounded by the graves of 72 of his relatives, which allude to the 72 martyred companions of Muhammad's grandson, Imam Hussein, at the Battle of Karbala in 680 CE.

== Conservation ==
In the 1970s, the mausoleum was thoroughly repaired and renovated by the Auqaf Department of the Government of Punjab. The entire glittering glazed interior is the result of new tiles and brickwork done by the Kashigars, or tile makers, of Multan.

The tomb is on the tentative list as a UNESCO World Heritage Site.

== Gallery ==
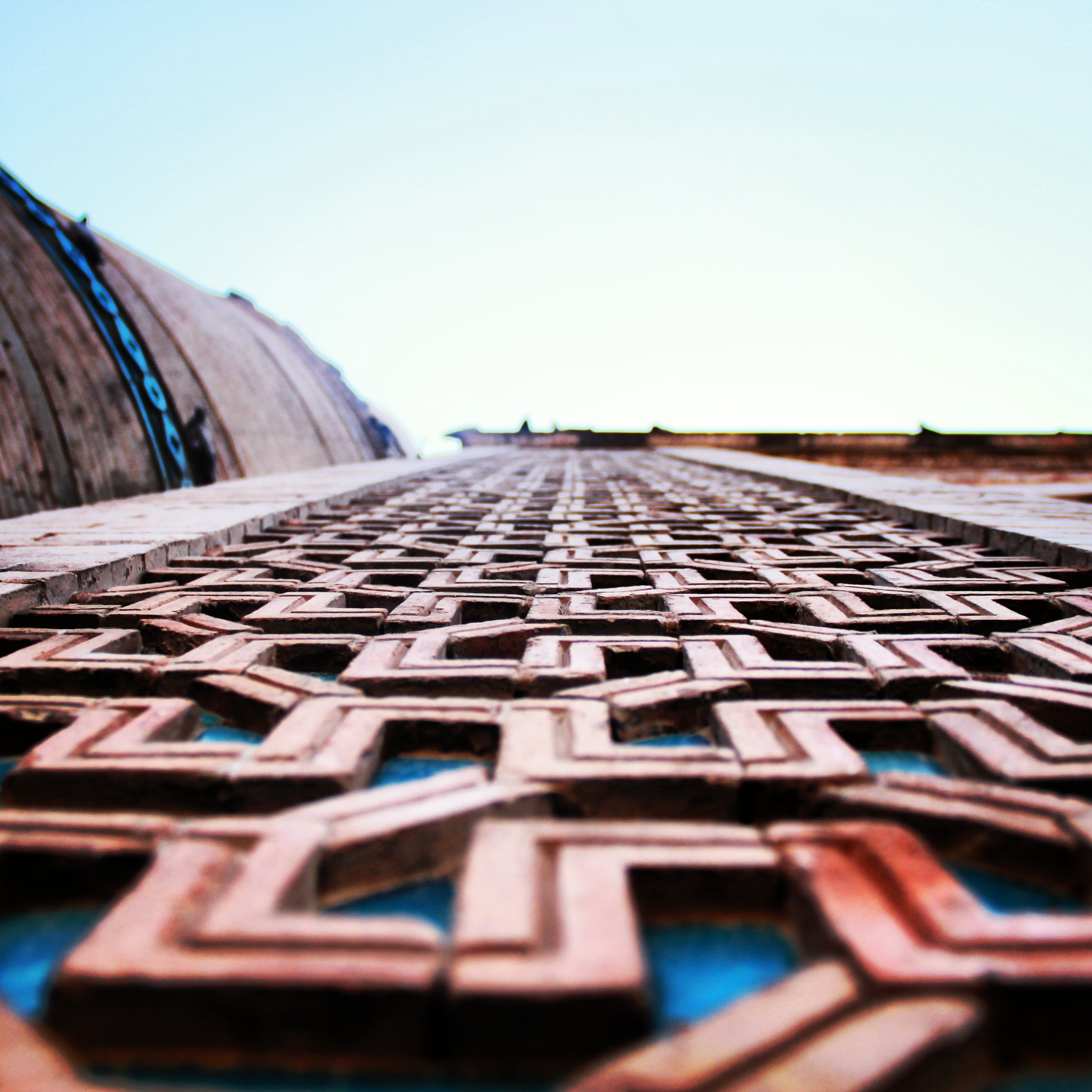
Detail of the shrine's carved brickwork

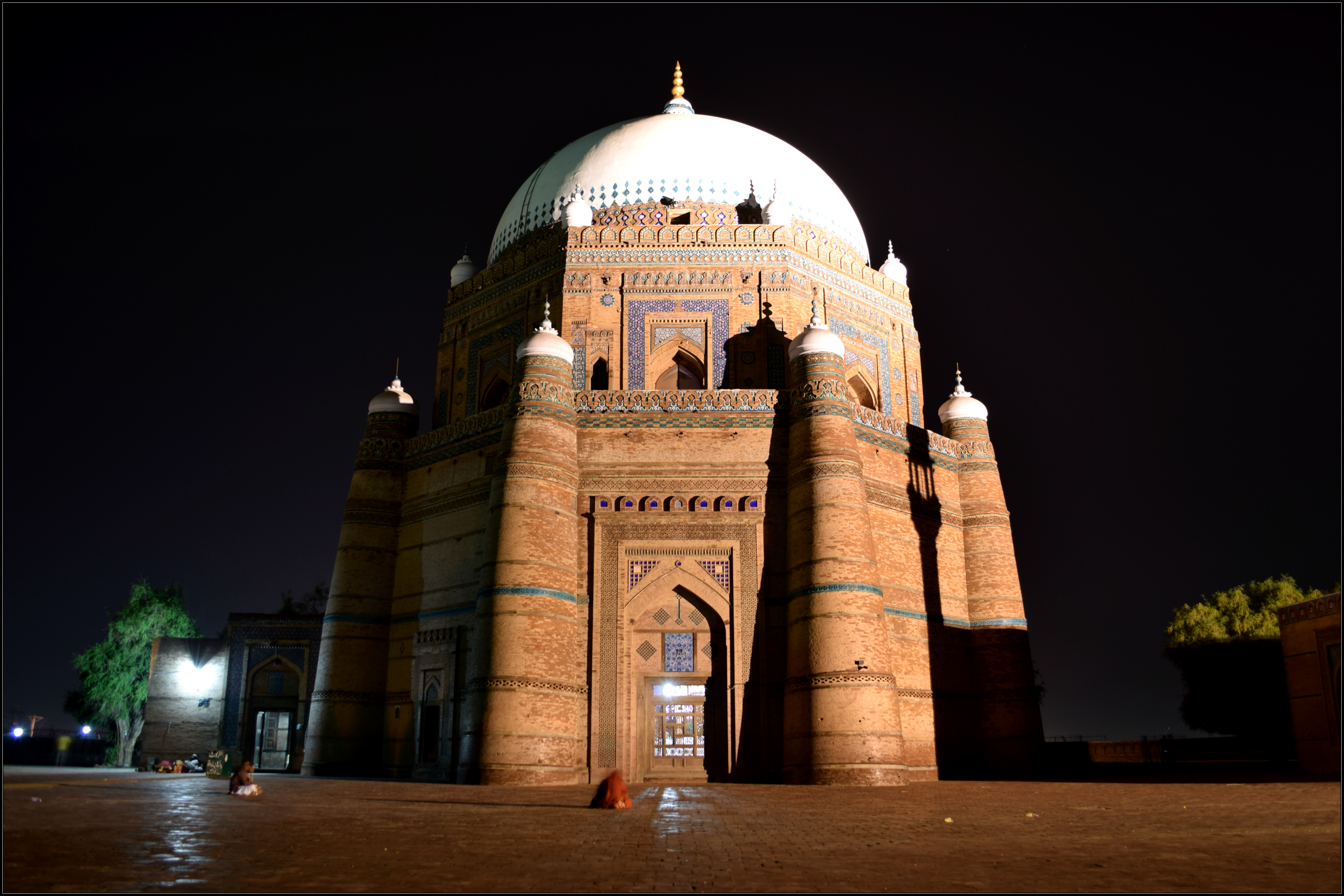
The shrine at night

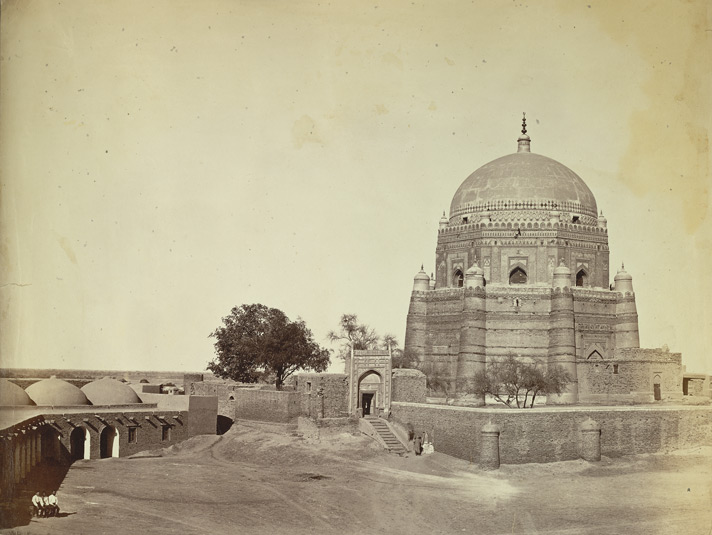
The tomb in 1865

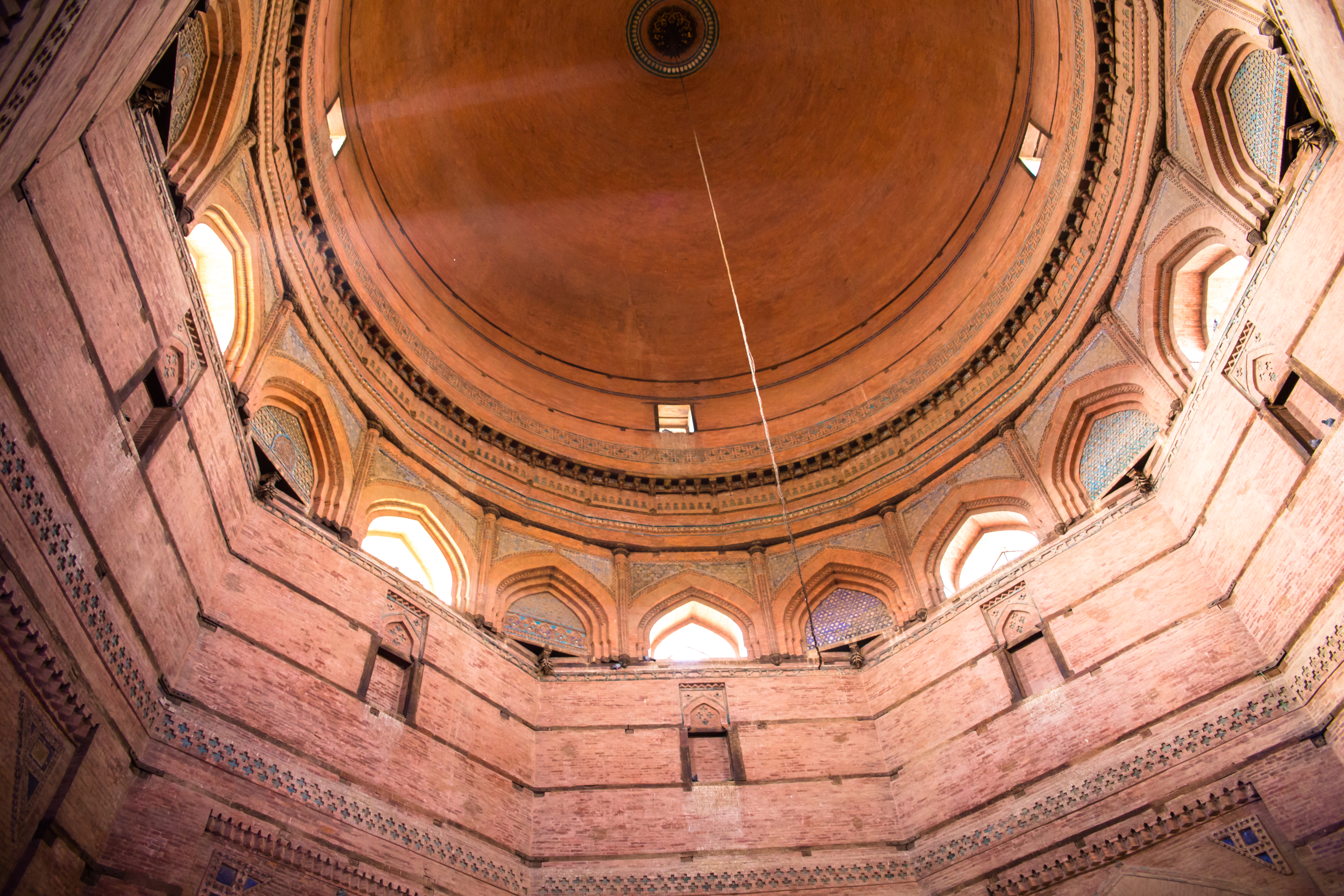
Underside of the shrine's dome

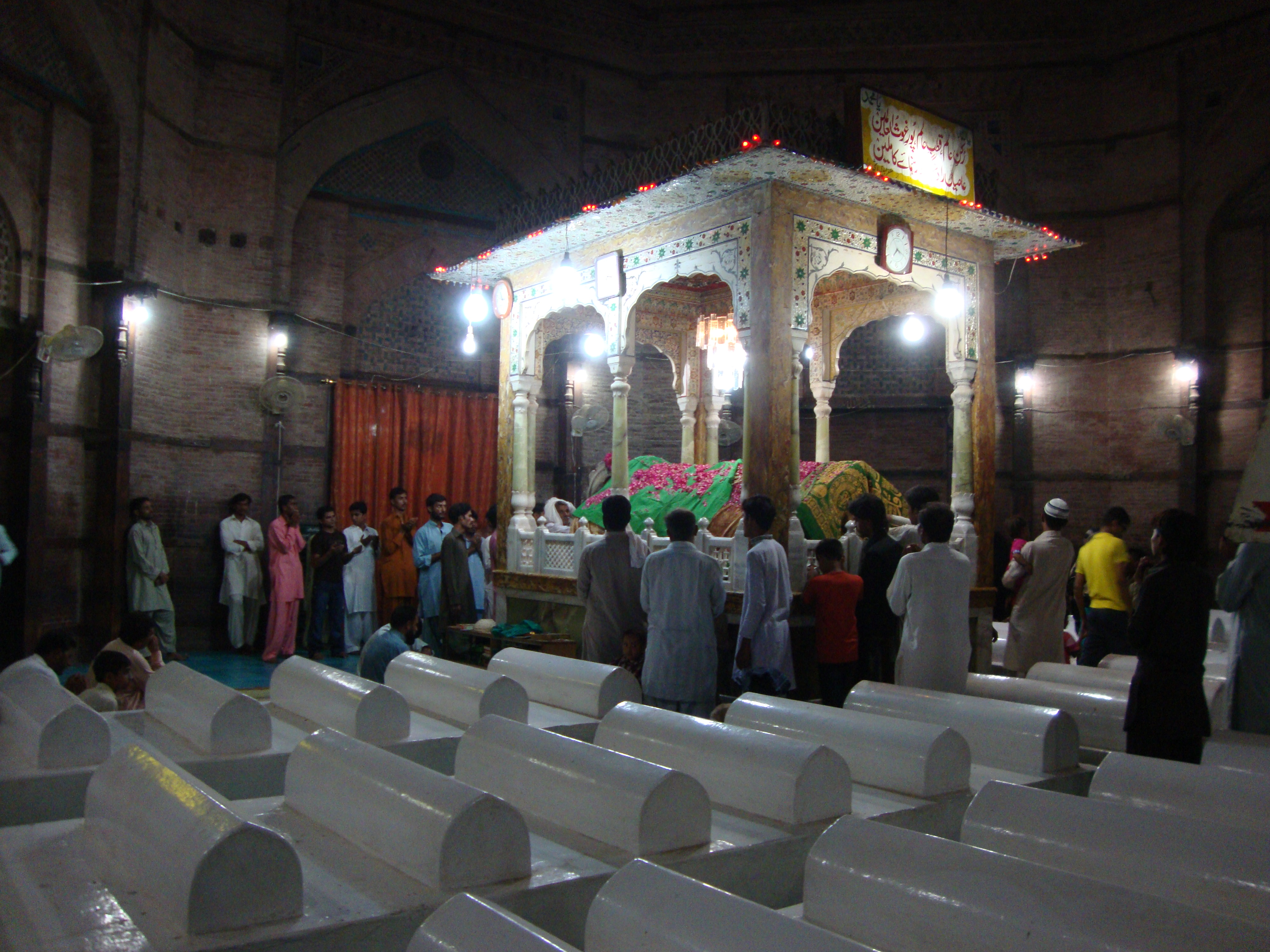
Devotees inside the shrine

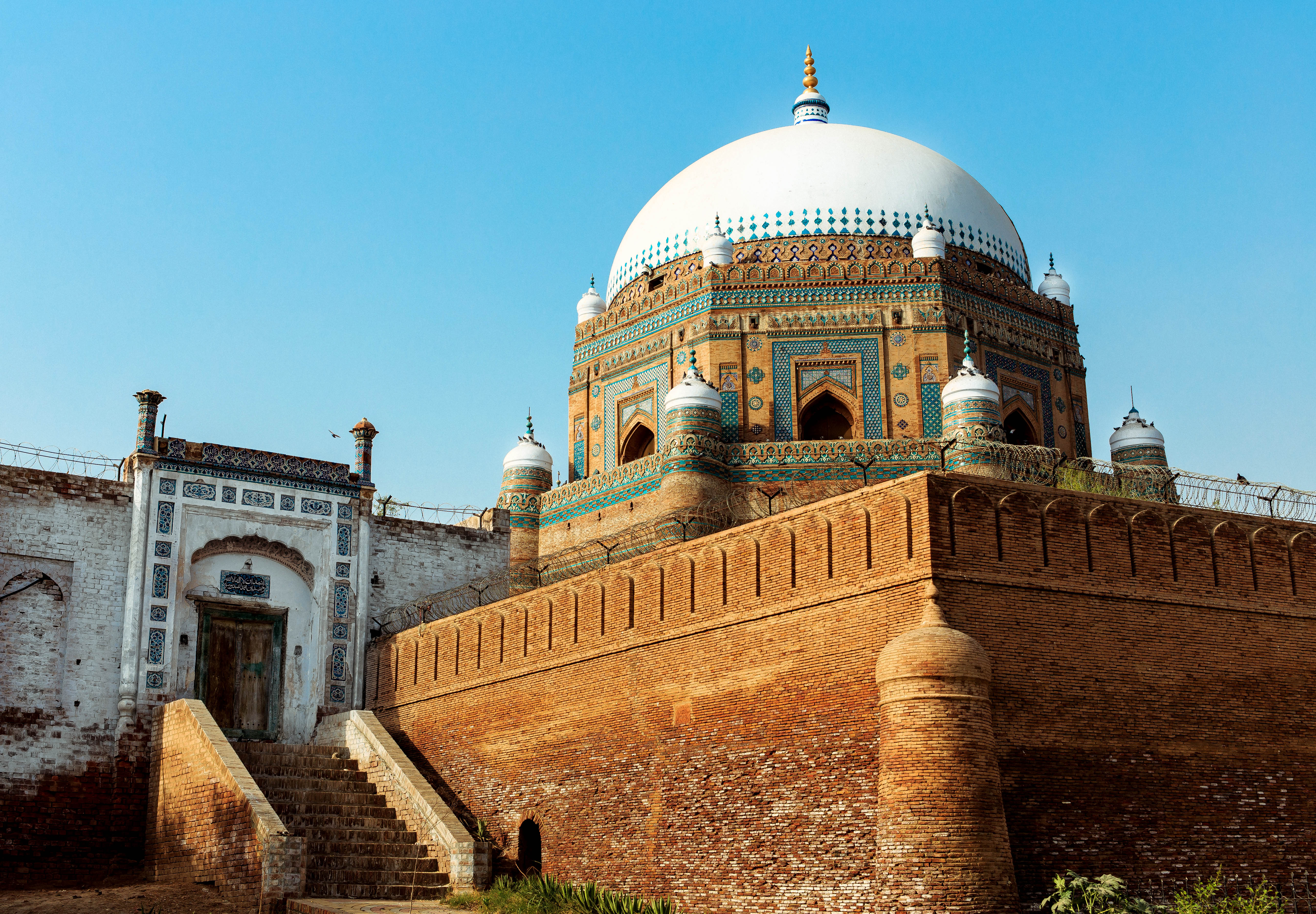
External view of the shrine

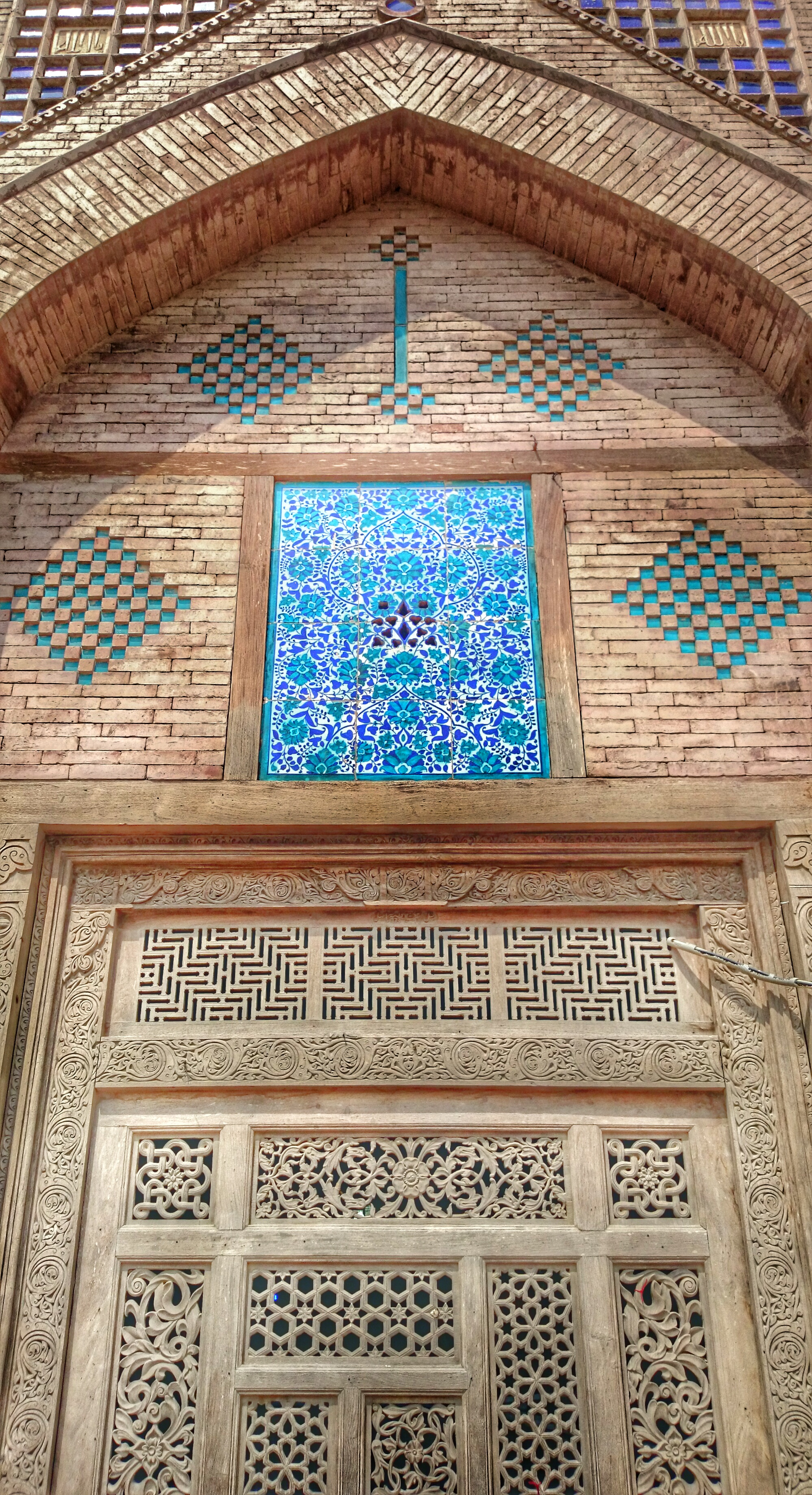
The shrine's exterior is embellished with a variety of decorative elements

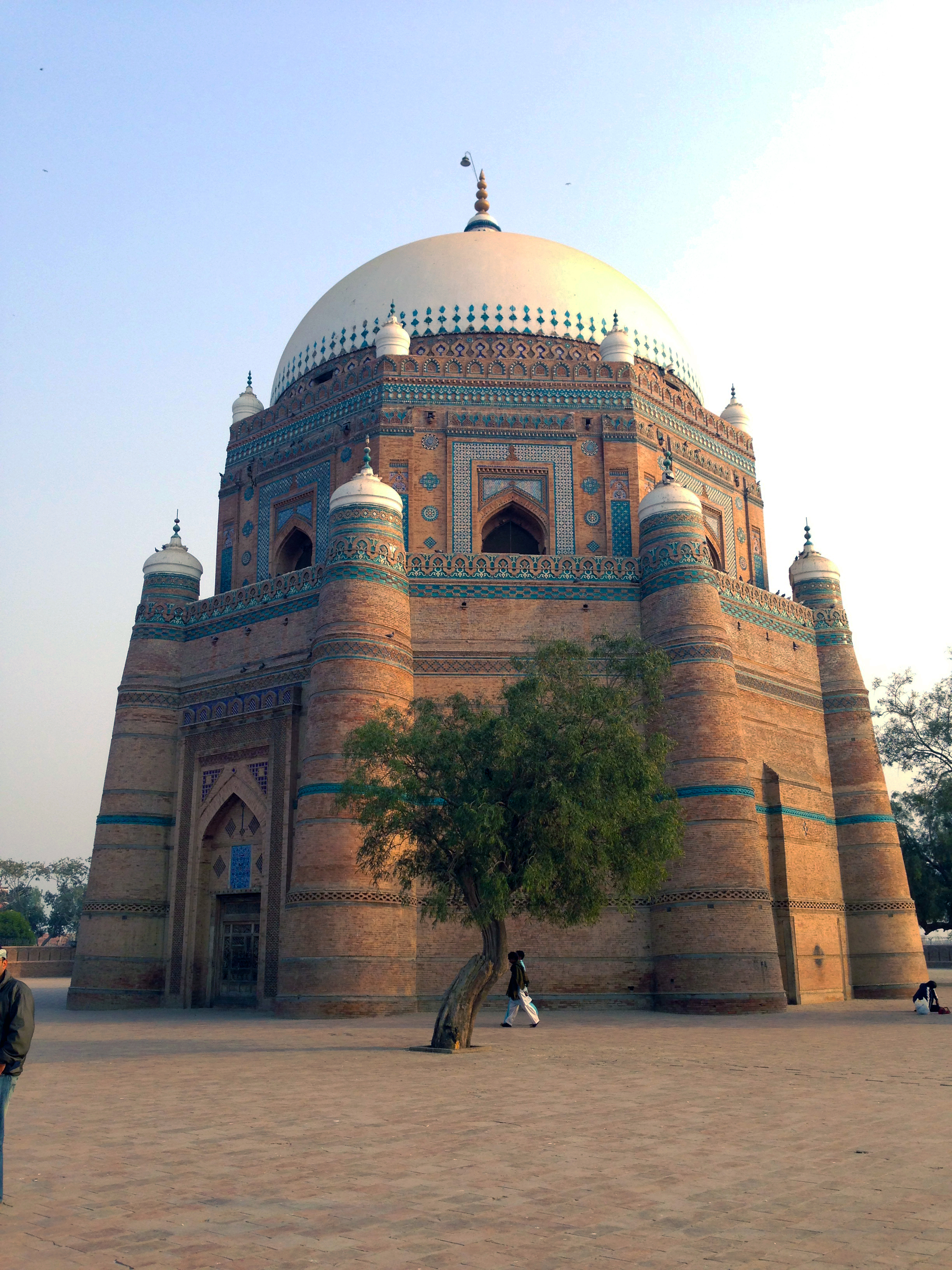
A view of the shrine from its courtyard
