= PP-211 Khanewal-VII =

Constituency of the Punjabi Provincial Legislature, Pakistan

- Constituency for the Provincial Assembly of Punjab
- Region: Khanewal Tehsil (partly) including Khanewal city of Khanewal District

Current constituency
- Created from: PP-214 Khanewal-III (2002-2018); PP-206 Khanewal-IV (2018-2023)

PP-211 Khanewal-VII (پی پی-211، خانیوال-7) is a Constituency of Provincial Assembly of Punjab.

== General elections 2024 ==
Provincial election 2024: PP-211 Khanewal-VII
Party	Candidate	Votes	%	±%
PML(N)	Rana Muhammad Saleem	53,599	47.05	
Independent	Imran Pervez (Note: Filed nomination papers as PTI candidate but ECP allowed him to run as an Independent)	35,194	30.89	
Independent	Sheikh Muhammad Ali	8,494	7.46	
PPP	Masood Majeed Khan	6,714	5.89	
TLP	Ghulam Ghous	6,217	5.46	
Others	Others (twenty one candidates)	3,702	3.25	
Turnout		115,937	49.91	
Total valid votes		113,920	98.26	
Rejected ballots		2,017	1.74	
Majority		18,405	16.16	
Registered electors		232,292		
hold				

== General elections 2018 ==
Provincial election 2018: PP-206 Khanewal-IV
Party	Candidate	Votes	%	±%
PML(N)	Nishat Ahmad Khan	51,478	45.02	
PTI	Rana Muhammad Saleem	47,917	41.91	
PPP	Syed Wasiq Sarjees Haider	6,620	5.79	
TLP	Muhammad Amir Sohail	5,773	5.05	
AAT	Mudassar Aalam	1,499	1.31	
Others	Others (nine candidates)	1,051	0.92	
Turnout		116,448	57.18	
Total valid votes		114,338	98.19	
Rejected ballots		2,110	1.81	
Majority		3,561	3.11	
Registered electors		203,661		

== General elections 2013 ==
Provincial election 2013: PP-214 Khanewal-III
Party	Candidate	Votes	%	±%
PML(N)	Nishat Ahmad Khan Daha	34,465	33.41	
PML(Q)	Rana Muhammad Saleem	21,657	20.99	
PTI	Imran Pervez	16,021	15.53	
Independent	Shafiq Ur Rehman	14,204	13.77	
Independent	Muhammad Hussain Bhatti	8,778	8.51	
Independent	Rao Abdul Ghaffar	4,073	3.95	
Others	Others (eleven candidates)	3,971	3.85	
Turnout		106,391	59.19	
Total valid votes		103,169	96.97	
Rejected ballots		3,222	3.03	
Majority		12,808	12.42	
Registered electors		179,755		

== General Elections 2008 ==
Contesting candidates	Party affiliation	Votes polled

== See also ==
- PP-210 Khanewal-VI
- PP-212 Khanewal-VIII
