= Chak 138/10-R =

Chak No. 138/10-R
- Village
- Chak No. 138/10-R
- Location within Pakistan
- Coordinates: 30.0144°N 71.729°E
- Country: Pakistan
- Province: Punjab
- District: Khanewal

Government
  - Nazim: Ch. Ikram-ul-Ghani
  - Naib Nazim: Rana Tanveer
- Time zone: UTC+5 (Pakistan Standard Time)
- Calling code: 065
- Number of Union councils: 1

Chak No. 138/10-R is a village situated in the Khanewal District of Punjab Province, Pakistan. The village is known for its educational institutions, commercial establishments, and significant industrial presence.

== History and Demographics ==
The village is primarily inhabited by the ARAIN caste, who migrated from India in 1947. They originally came from villages in areas such as Buttar wala, Dollywalia, Kadokany, Patiala and Ferozepur. This migration has contributed to the village's cultural and social landscape.

== Geography ==
Chak No. 138/10-R is located in the fertile region of Punjab, characterized by its agricultural landscape and close proximity to the Indus River basin. The village benefits from the irrigation system of the region, which supports its agricultural activities.

== Infrastructure and Economy ==
Chak No. 138/10-R features a range of commercial establishments including nine bakery shops, one utility store, and three private colleges, catering to the educational and daily needs of its residents.

The village is also home to [Evergreen Sires](http://www.evergreensires.com), the largest animal semen production facility in South Punjab. This facility plays a crucial role in the local and regional agricultural sector by providing high-quality semen for livestock breeding.

All roads in the village are carpeted, which enhances connectivity and supports both the residential and industrial activities in the area.

== Education ==
The [Government Higher Secondary School for Boys](http://bisemultan.edu.pk/institutes.php) and the [Government Girls High School](http://bisemultan.edu.pk/institutes.php) are the primary educational institutions serving the village. These schools are well-regarded and contribute significantly to the educational advancement of the local community.

== Famous Persons ==
- Mr. Khalid Javed PP-210 (Khanewal-VI)
- Dr. Rehmat Ali Arian ((Late)
- Sir. Abul Slam Shah (Late)
- Prof. Shamsul Islam Shah (Late)
- Sir. Zafar Iqbal (Late)
- Sir. Kashif Israr (Late)
- NK- Tanveer Ahmad Shaheed (PAK Army)
- Mr. Faiq Anwar Arain (Senior Software Engineer Lahore)
