= Tulamba =

Pakistani town

Tulamba تلَمبہ
- Town
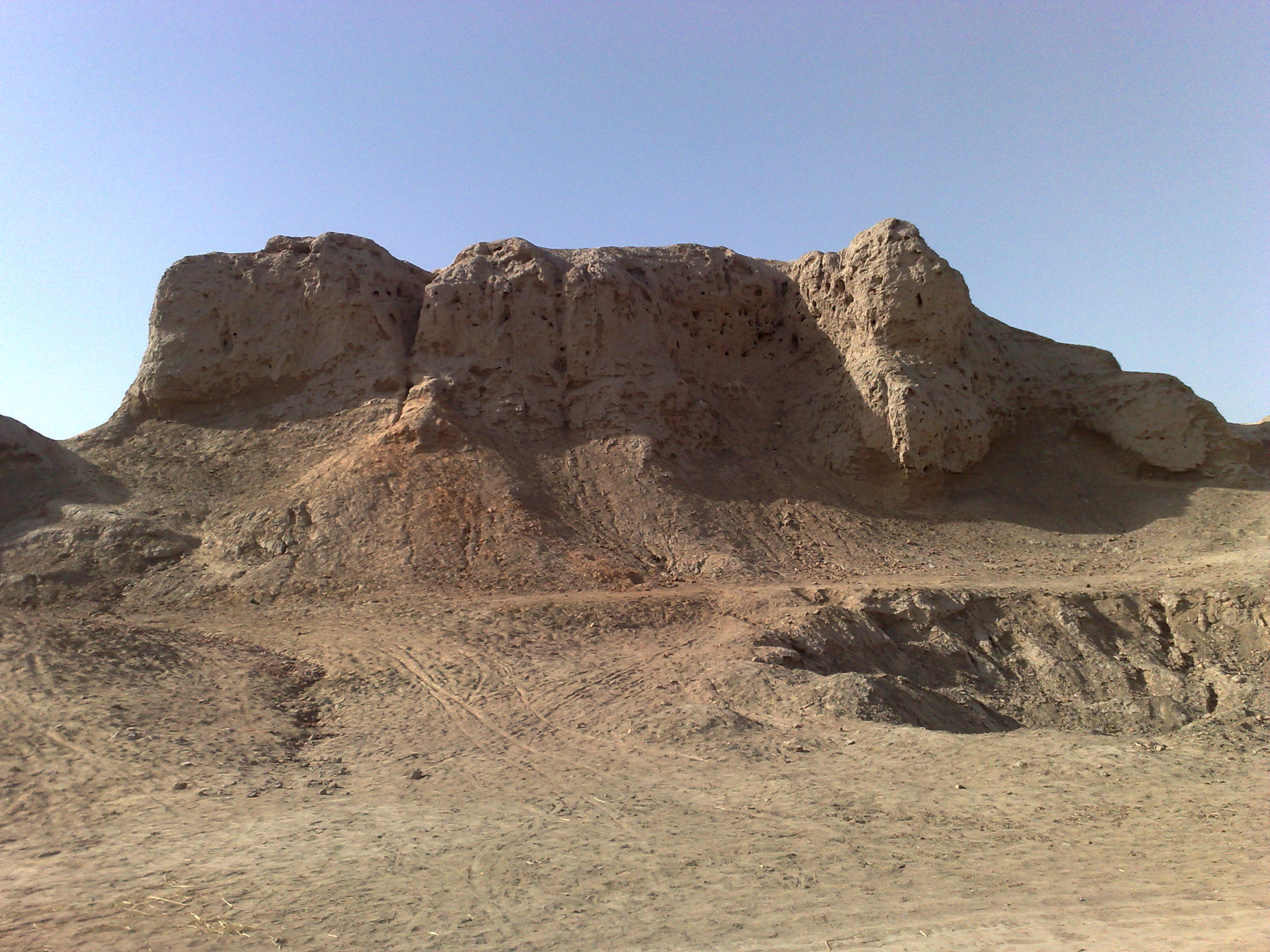
- Ruins at Tulamba

- Location within Pakistan
- Coordinates: 30.525485°N 72.239766°E
- Country: Pakistan
- Province: Punjab

Population
  - Estimate (2018): 70,000
- Time zone: UTC+4 (PST)
- Postal code: 58080

Tulamba (also Tulambah) (Urdu: تلَمبہ) is a small town in Punjab, Pakistan. Tulamba is situated on the eastern bank of the Ravi River, between the cities of Abdul Hakeem and Mian Channu. Prior to 1985, Tulamba was administered as part of the district of Multan, but in 1985 it was included in Mian Channu Tehsil of the newly formed Khanewal District. Tulamba's population is nearly 50,000. The spoken language is Rachnavi Punjabi. A native of Tulamba is referred to as a Tulmabvi.

== History ==
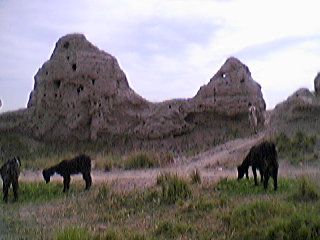
Ruins of Tulamba

Map of Tulamba

Tulamba is more than 2,500 years old. Archaeological digs have uncovered four distinct layers, belonging to the Hindu, Buddhist, Muslim, Sikh civilisations. The coins of several prior governments have been excavated here.

Tulamba saw the influence of several Mahajanapada of ancient India, mainly Gandhara, Kamboja and Magadha. By 400-300 BCE, the region came under the influence of several Magadha dynasties of eastern India. The first was that of the Nanda Empire of ancient India from 300 BCE, and with the rise of Chandragupta Maurya, the region came under the complete control of the Mauryan Empire. After the victory of the Mauryan Empire against the Greeks in the Seleucid–Mauryan war, much of the region came under the rule of Chandragupta Maurya of ancient India. Chandragupta and Seleucus made a peace settlement in 304 BCE. Selecucus Nucator ceded the satrapies, including those in Chitral to the expanding Mauryan Empire. The alliance was solidified with a marriage between Chandragupta Maurya and a princess of the Seleucid Empire. The outcome of the arrangement proved to be mutually beneficial. The border between the Seleucid and Mauryan Empires remained stable in subsequent generations, and friendly diplomatic relations are reflected by the ambassador Megasthenes, and by the envoys sent westward by Chandragupta's grandson Ashoka. Afterward, the region was briefly and nominally controlled by the Shunga Empire. However, with the decline of the Shungas, the region passed to local Hindu and Buddhist rulers, and interrupted by foreign rulers. Many of these foreign rulers, like the Indo-Parthians, Sakas, and Kushans converted to Hinduism and Buddhism, and promoted these Indian religions throughout Central and South Asia. The region reached its height under the Buddhist ruler Kanishka the Great. After the fall of the Kushans, the region came under the control of the Gupta Empire of ancient India. During the period, Hindu and Buddhist art and architecture flourished in the area.

Tulamba was listed in the Ain-i-Akbari as a pargana in sarkar Multan, counted as part of the Bari Doab. It was assessed at 1,200,778 dams in revenue and supplied a force of 800 cavalry and 5,000 infantry.

The ruins of the older city are 1 kilometre (0.62 mi) from the current city. They are in generally poor condition due to rain and neglect, although their bricks are still visible. When Dr. Sayyed Zahid Ali Wasti visited Tulamba in 1967, he saw the ruins spread over an area of several miles, including a walled fort with a high tower and a three-thousand-year-old protective trench around the fort. He described the walls as beautifully plastered with mud, and floors that were not solid. Most of what he described in 1967 is now outdated as the ruins have since been further destroyed and eroded.

According to early archeologists from the Archaeological Survey of India, during the British Indian Empire, they found strong fortresses left from the previous Hindu and Buddhist civilisations. There was a giant city, which was in use during the Hindu Shahi era, protected by a fort, which was over 1,000 square feet. The outer rampart was of earth, and it was 200 feet thick walls and 20 feet high.

It is also known that the Moghul Emperor Timur came to the city of Tulamba in 1398 A.D. The Memoirs of Emperor Timur mention: "When I had dismissed the ambassadors I crossed the Indus, on Tuesday, the 12th of Muharram A.H. 801 (24th Sept., A.D. 1398).... When all my troops had crossed in safety, I marched forward, and when I arrived at the city of Tulamba, I pitched my camp on the bank of the river. Tulamba is about seventy miles from Multan. On the same day, the Sayyids, and 'Ulama, and Sheikhs, and chief men and rulers of Tulamba came out to meet me. As sincerity was clearly written on their foreheads, every one of them according to his rank was distinguished by marks of my princely favour."

=== Religious significance ===
Guru Nanak, the first Sikh Guru, came here during his travels. Guru Har Rai, the Seventh Sikh Master, sent a masand (preacher) to preach Sikhism to the local people of this area.

The Islamic history of Tulamba began when Muhammad bin Qasim came to Tulamba on his way to Multan. The place he passed is now known as Qasim Bazar.

=== Military history ===
The people of Tulamba have encountered many armies in the city's history as a result of its geographic position. Armies coming from the north and west had to pass through Tulamba to get to the strategic city of Multan. Alexander the Great came to Tulamba when he invaded the Indian sub-continent. At that time Tulamba was ruled by the Moi people, who fought Alexander's forces.

The ancestor of the Mughals, Taimur-e-Lang, also invaded Tulamba, at that time called Tulma.Timurid forces firstly sacked Tulamba and then Multan by October 1398.

Sher Shah Suri built a fort in the center of the city. The boundary wall and some parts of the original building are still present. The fort is now occupied by the girls higher secondary school and the offices of the town committee.

== Geography and climate ==
Tulamba is situated on the eastern edge of the Ravi River, at a distance of 100 kilometres (62 mi) from Multan.

The climate of Tulamba is variable. The summer season is very hot, followed by a series of heavy rains. The winter season is very cold and often foggy.

== Culture ==
Tulamba is a formal city. The normal dress is the shalwar kameez, with the dhoti also popular. Older people wear the pagri or safa on their head. All the houses are built with solid bricks and concrete. The lifestyle is modern, and the use of electric and electronic equipments are common.

The main occupations are farming and trading. Many people work for the government or in the private sector.

Popular sports are dhappi (volleyball) football, cricket, hockey and kabaddi.

== Sites of interest ==
The ruins of the ancient city are situated on the edge of the modern city. The Sidhnai Canal and a point on the edge of the Ravi River are also used for recreation. Other sites of interest are Darbar Mamon Sheer Bukhari and Darbar Rehmat Ali Shah.

== Educational institutions ==
Tulamba is home to many educational facilities, including Government higher secondary schools for girls and boys, a Government High School for boys, a government college for woman, two government middle schools, and a primary school. The first private school, Star Modal Middle School Tulamba, was established in 1985, The Educators school, a project of Beacon house School System, established in March 2013 which is the largest educational network of Pakistan.

Additional facilities include Minhaj Model school, established in 1997, a divisional public school, and Husnain grammar school.

About twenty private schools are present in various locations, most of them being are English or Islamic. The Islamic educational institutes located in Tulamba are Madrisa Qadria, Darbar Rehmat Ali Shah, Imam Bargah Hussainia, and Daraluloom Syed Niaz Ahmed Shah Sahin.

== Transport ==
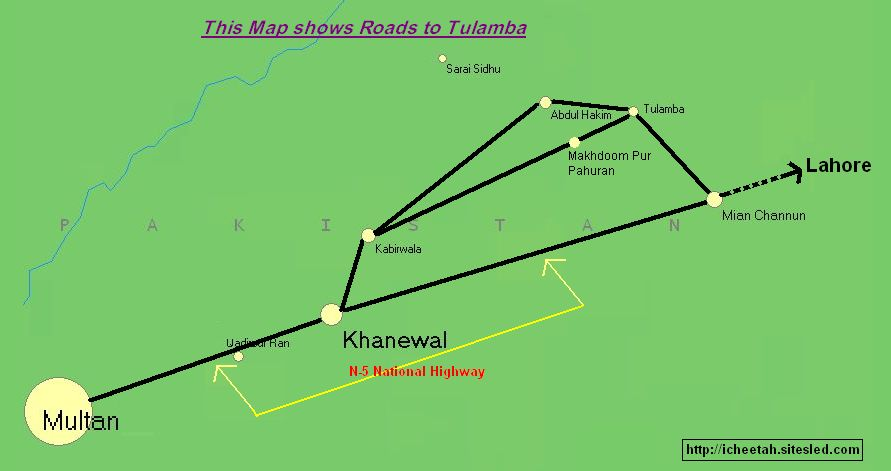
RoadMap to Tulamba

The N-5 National Highway, a 15 minutes drive from Tulamba, provides the primary road link for Tulamba, giving easy access to Multan and Lahore.

Multan can also be reached through Abdul Hakeem, as well as through Makhdoom Pur and Kabirwala.

The M-4 Motorway has been constructed now and it can be accessed via Abdul Hakim its interchange is 17 km away from city.

== Facilities ==
The facilities of fresh water, electricity, gas, telephone and internet are available in Tulamba. A government hospital and six private hospitals are located in the city, as well as a veterinary hospital to treat livestock, and an artificial insemination centre situated at Thana Road.

== Agriculture ==
The land around Tulamba is very fertile, especially in Kalupitra situated 8 kilometres (5.0 mi) west of Tulamba. The main crops are rice, wheat, corn, sugar cane, cotton, and vegetables such as tomato, carrot, potato, radish, cabbage, onion, brinjal, and okra. The people of Kalupitra are fond of agricultural farming, though cattle farming is also popular, with many varieties of buffalo and cows kept.

== Notable people ==
- Maulana Tariq Jameel, Islamic scholar (b. 1953)
