= Kabirwala Tehsil =

Kabirwala Tehsil تحصِيل كبِيروالا
- Tehsil
- Interactive map of Kabirwala Tehsil
- Country: Pakistan
- Region: (Punjab, Pakistan) Punjab
- District: Khanewal

Population (2017)
  - Tehsil: 959,861
  - Urban: 150,114
  - Rural: 809,747
- Time zone: UTC+5 (PST)
- Postal code: 58200
- Website: http://www.mckabirwala.lgpunjab.org.pk

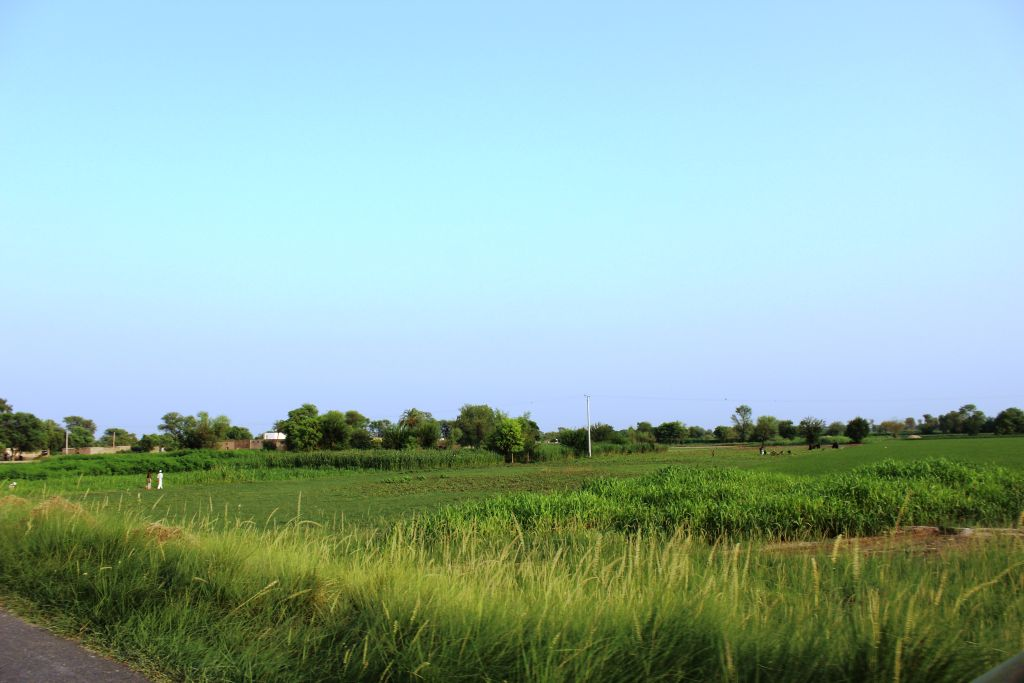
Agricultural landscape in the Kabirwala Tehsil, Khanewal District.

Kabirwala (Urdu: تحصِيل كبِيروالا) is a tehsil, or administrative subdivision, of Khanewal District in the Punjab province of Pakistan.

== Administration ==
It is administratively subdivided into around three dozen Union Councils, two of which form the tehsil capital Kabirwala.

The 37 Union Councils of Kabirwala tehsil are:

- Abdul Hakim-I
- Abdul Hakim-II
- Ali pur
- Bagar Sargana
- Baqir Pur
- Chak Haidar Abad
- Chak Naurang Shah
- Daduana
- Dharkhana
- Hashmat Mirali
- Haveli Koranga
- Husain Abad
- Ibrahimpur
- Jasso Kanwain
- Jodh Pur
- Kabirwala-I
- Bati Bangla
- Kabirwala-II
- Kot Bahadur
- Kot Islam
- Kund Sargana
- Mahni Sial
- Maan Kot
- Mari Sahu
- Mangan Wala
- Moula Pur
- Mamdal
- Nabi Pur
- Narhal Bani Hashim, Gudaray
- Okan Wala
- Qatal Pur
- Salar Wahin Nau (Thaheeman wala)
- Sardar Pur
- Sham Kot
- Sarai Sidhu
- Umeed Garh
- Haji Pur

== Towns ==
- Mohri Pur
- Sarai Sidhu

== Notable people ==
- Syed Hussain Jahania Gardezi is a Pakistani politician, who has served as a provincial minister of Punjab for management and professional development.
- Chaudhary Muzammil Bandesha is a Pakistani politician and Ciy president of Pakistan Tehreek-e-Insaf
