= Har Gobind Khorana =

Indian-American molecular biologist (1922–2011)

Har Gobind Khorana HonFRS
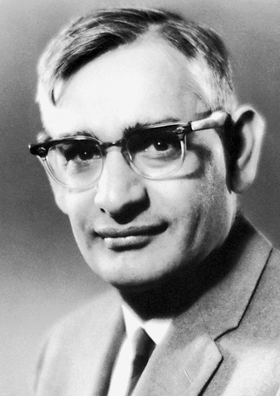
- Born: 9 January 1922; Raipur, Kabirwala Tehsil, Khanewal Punjab, British India (present-day Punjab, Pakistan)
- Died: 9 November 2011 (aged 89); Concord, Massachusetts, U.S.
- Citizenship: United States
- Education: Punjab University (BS, MS); University of Liverpool (PhD)
- Known for: First to demonstrate the role of nucleotides in protein synthesis
- Spouse: Esther Elizabeth Sibler (died 2001)
- Awards: Nobel Prize in Medicine (1968); Gairdner Foundation International Award (1980); Louisa Gross Horwitz Prize; Albert Lasker Award for Basic Medical Research; Padma Vibhushan; Willard Gibbs Award (1974)
- Scientific career
- Fields: Molecular biology
- Workplaces: MIT (1970–2007); University of Wisconsin–Madison (1960–70); University of British Columbia (1952–60); University of Cambridge (1950–52); Swiss Federal Institute of Technology, Zurich (1948–49)
- Doctoral advisor: Roger J.S. Beer
- Doctoral students: Shiladitya DasSarma

Har Gobind Khorana (9 January 1922 – 9 November 2011) was an Indian-American biochemist. While on the faculty of the University of Wisconsin–Madison, he shared the 1968 Nobel Prize for Physiology or Medicine with Marshall W. Nirenberg and Robert W. Holley for research that showed the order of nucleotides in nucleic acids, which carry the genetic code of the cell and control the cell's synthesis of proteins. Khorana and Nirenberg were also awarded the Louisa Gross Horwitz Prize from Columbia University in the same year.

Born in Raipur, Punjab (during the British Raj), Khorana served on the faculties of three universities in North America. He became a naturalized citizen of the United States in 1966, and received the National Medal of Science in 1987.

== Biography ==
Har Gobind Khorana was born during the British Raj to Ganpatrai Khorana and Krishna Devi, in Raipur, a village near Multan, Punjab, British India, in a Punjabi Hindu (arora punjabi family). The exact date of his birth is not certain but he believed that it might have been 9 January 1922; this date was later shown in some documents, and has been widely accepted. He was the youngest of five children. His father was a patwari, a village agricultural taxation clerk in the British Indian government. In his autobiography, Khorana wrote this summary: "Although poor, my father was dedicated to educating his children and we were practically the only literate family in the village inhabited by about 100 people." The first four years of his education were provided under a tree, a spot that was, in effect, the only school in the village." He did not even own a pencil until age 6.

He attended D.A.V. (Dayanand Anglo-Vedic) High School in Multan and Government College, in Lahore. Later, he studied at the Punjab University in Lahore, with the assistance of scholarships, where he obtained a bachelor's degree in 1943 and a Master of Science degree in 1945.

Khorana lived in British ruled India until 1945, when he moved to England to study organic chemistry at the University of Liverpool on a Government of India Fellowship. He received his PhD in 1948 advised by Roger J. S. Beer. The following year, he pursued postdoctoral studies with Professor Vladimir Prelog at ETH Zurich in Switzerland. He worked for nearly a year on alkaloid chemistry in an unpaid position.

His family moved to Delhi from Multan as refugees during the partition of India and Khorana was never to visit his place of birth after that. During a brief period in 1949, he was unable to find a job in Delhi. He returned to England on a fellowship to work with George Wallace Kenner and Alexander R. Todd on peptides and nucleotides. He stayed in Cambridge from 1950 until 1952.

He moved to Vancouver, British Columbia, with his family in 1952 after accepting a position with the British Columbia Research Council at University of British Columbia. Khorana was excited by the prospect of starting his own lab, a colleague later recalled. His mentor later said that the council had few facilities at the time but gave the researcher "all the freedom in the world". His work in British Columbia was on "nucleic acids and synthesis of many important biomolecules" according to the American Chemical Society.

In 1960 Khorana accepted a position as co-director of the University of Wisconsin–Madison's Institute for Enzyme Research He became a professor of biochemistry in 1962 and was named Conrad A. Elvehjem Professor of Life Sciences in 1964. While at Wisconsin, "he helped decipher the mechanisms by which RNA codes for the synthesis of proteins" and "began to work on synthesizing functional genes". During his tenure at this university, he completed the work that led to sharing the Nobel Prize in 1968. The Nobel web site states that it was "for their interpretation of the genetic code and its function in protein synthesis". Har Gobind Khorana's role is stated as follows: he "made important contributions to this field by building different RNA chains with the help of enzymes. Using these enzymes, he was able to produce proteins. The amino acid sequences of these proteins then solved the rest of the puzzle."

He became a US citizen in 1966. Beginning in 1970, Khorana was the Alfred P. Sloan Professor of Biology and Chemistry at the Massachusetts Institute of Technology and later, a member of the Board of Scientific Governors at The Scripps Research Institute. He retired from MIT in 2007.

Har Gobind Khorana married Esther Elizabeth Sibler in 1952. They had met in Switzerland and had three children, Julia Elizabeth, Emily Anne, and Dave Roy.

== Research ==
Ribonucleic acid (RNA) with two repeating units (UCUCUCU → UCU CUC UCU) produced two alternating amino acids. This, combined with the Nirenberg and Leder experiment, showed that UCU genetically codes for serine and CUC codes for leucine. RNAs with three repeating units (UACUACUA → UAC UAC UAC, or ACU ACU ACU, or CUA CUA CUA) produced three different strings of amino acids. RNAs with four repeating units including UAG, UAA, or UGA, produced only dipeptides and tripeptides thus revealing that UAG, UAA, and UGA are stop codons.

Their Nobel lecture was delivered on 12 December 1968. Khorana was the first scientist to chemically synthesize oligonucleotides. This achievement, in the 1970s, was also the world's first synthetic gene; in later years, the process has become widespread. Subsequent scientists referred to his research while advancing genome editing with the CRISPR/Cas9 system.

=== Subsequent research ===
After years of work, he was the first in the world to complete the total synthesis of a functional gene outside a living organism in 1972. He did this by extending the above to long DNA polymers using non-aqueous chemistry and assembled these into the first synthetic gene, using polymerase and ligase enzymes that link pieces of DNA together, as well as methods that anticipated the invention of polymerase chain reaction (PCR). These custom-designed pieces of artificial genes are widely used in biology labs for sequencing, cloning and engineering new plants and animals, and are integral to the expanding use of DNA analysis to understand gene-based human disease as well as human evolution. Khorana's invention(s) have become automated and commercialized so that anyone now can order a synthetic oligonucleotide or a gene from any of a number of companies. One merely needs to send the genetic sequence to one of the companies to receive an oligonucleotide with the desired sequence.

After the middle of the 1970s, his lab studied the biochemistry of bacteriorhodopsin, a membrane protein that converts light energy into chemical energy by creating a proton gradient. Later, his lab went on to study the structurally related visual pigment known as rhodopsin.

A summary of his work was provided by a former colleague at the University of Wisconsin: "Khorana was an early practitioner, and perhaps a founding father, of the field of chemical biology. He brought the power of chemical synthesis to bear on deciphering the genetic code, relying on different combinations of trinucleotides."

== Awards and honors ==
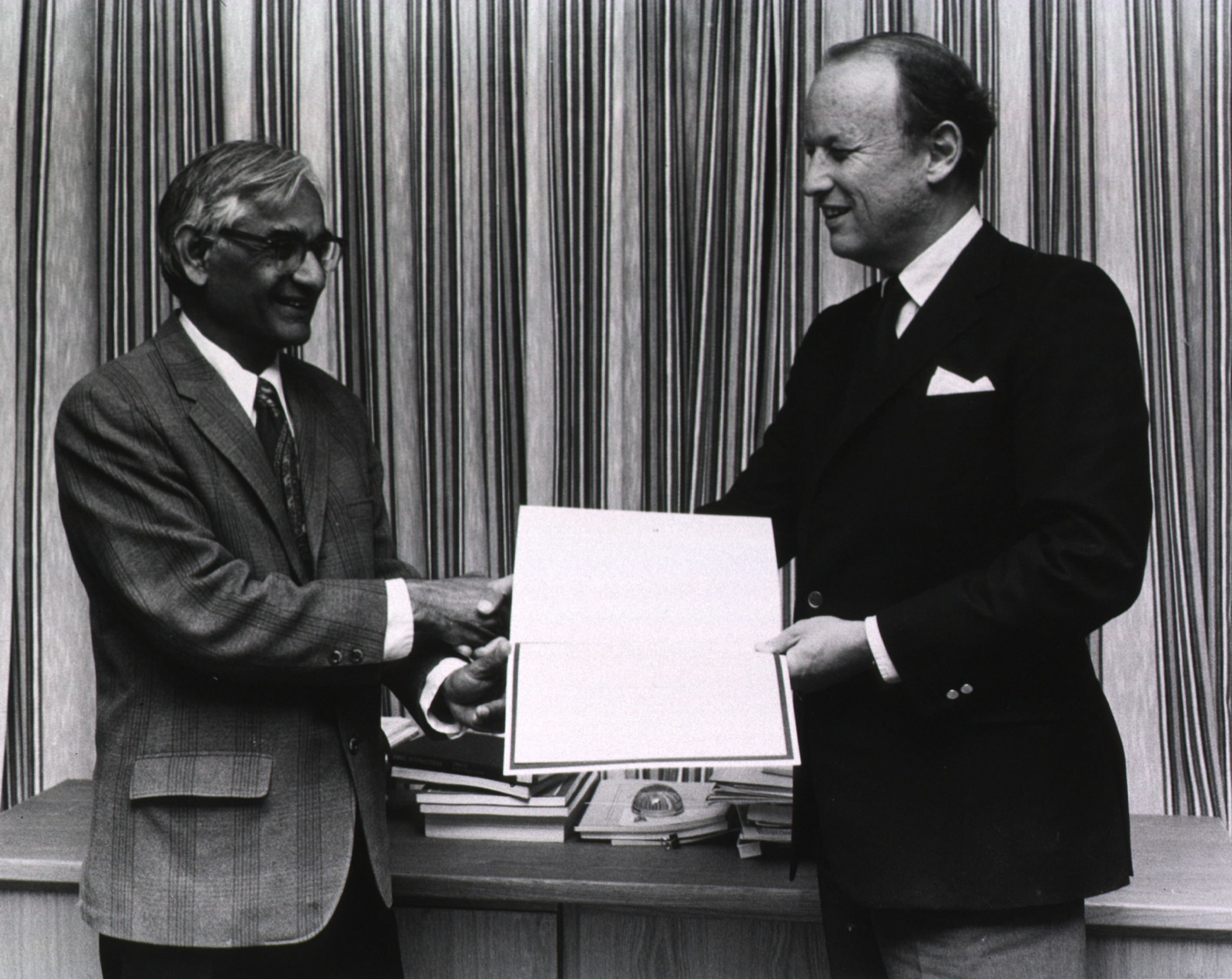
Har Gobind Khorana receiving NIH lecture award

In addition to sharing the Nobel Prize, Khorana was elected a member of the United States National Academy of Sciences in 1966, a member of the American Academy of Arts and Sciences in 1967, a member of the American Philosophical Society in 1973, and a Foreign Member of the Royal Society (ForMemRS) in 1978. The Indian government awarded Khorana the Padma Vibhushan in 1969.

In 2009, Khorana was hosted by the Khorana Program and honored at the 33rd Steenbock Symposium in Madison, Wisconsin.

Other honors included the Louisa Gross Horwitz Prize from Columbia University and the Lasker Foundation Award for Basic Medical Research, both in 1969, the Golden Plate Award of the American Academy of Achievement in 1971, the Willard Gibbs Medal of the Chicago section of the American Chemical Society, in 1974, the Gairdner Foundation Annual Award, in 1980 and the Paul Kayser International Award of Merit in Retina Research, in 1987.

On 9 January 2018, a Google Doodle celebrated the achievements of Har Gobind Khorana on what would have been his 96th birthday.

The "Khorana Program" by Government of India's Department of Biotechnology, the University of Wisconsin–Madison, Wisconsin–India Science and Technology Exchange Program (WINStep Forward/WSF) and the Indo-US Science and Technology Forum is a scholarship instituted in his name, since 2007 it has offered Indian students research opportunities at certain US universities. The mission of the Khorana Program is to build a seamless community of scientists, industrialists, and social entrepreneurs in the United States and India. The program is focused on three objectives: Providing graduate and undergraduate students with a transformative research experience, engaging partners in rural development and food security, and facilitating public-private partnerships between the U.S. and India. The WINStep Forward adopted administration responsibilities for the Khorana program in 2007. WINStep Forward was jointly created by Drs. Aseem Ansari and Ken Shapiro at the University of Wisconsin–Madison. WINStep Forward also administers the nationally competitive S. N. Bose Programs for Indian and American students, respectively, to promote both fundamental and applied research not only in biotechnology but broadly across all STEM (science, technology, engineering, and mathematics) fields, including medicine, pharmacy, agriculture, wildlife and climate change.

A park in the Wesbrook Village in the UBC is named after Khorana.

== Death ==
Khorana died on 9 November 2011, in Concord, Massachusetts, at the age of 89. His wife, Esther, and daughter, Emily Anne, had died earlier, but Khorana was survived by his other two children. Julia Elizabeth later wrote about her father's work as a professor: "Even while doing all this research, he was always really interested in education, in students and young people."
