= Shrine of Khalid Walid =

Pakistani sufi shrine

- مقبره خالد وليد
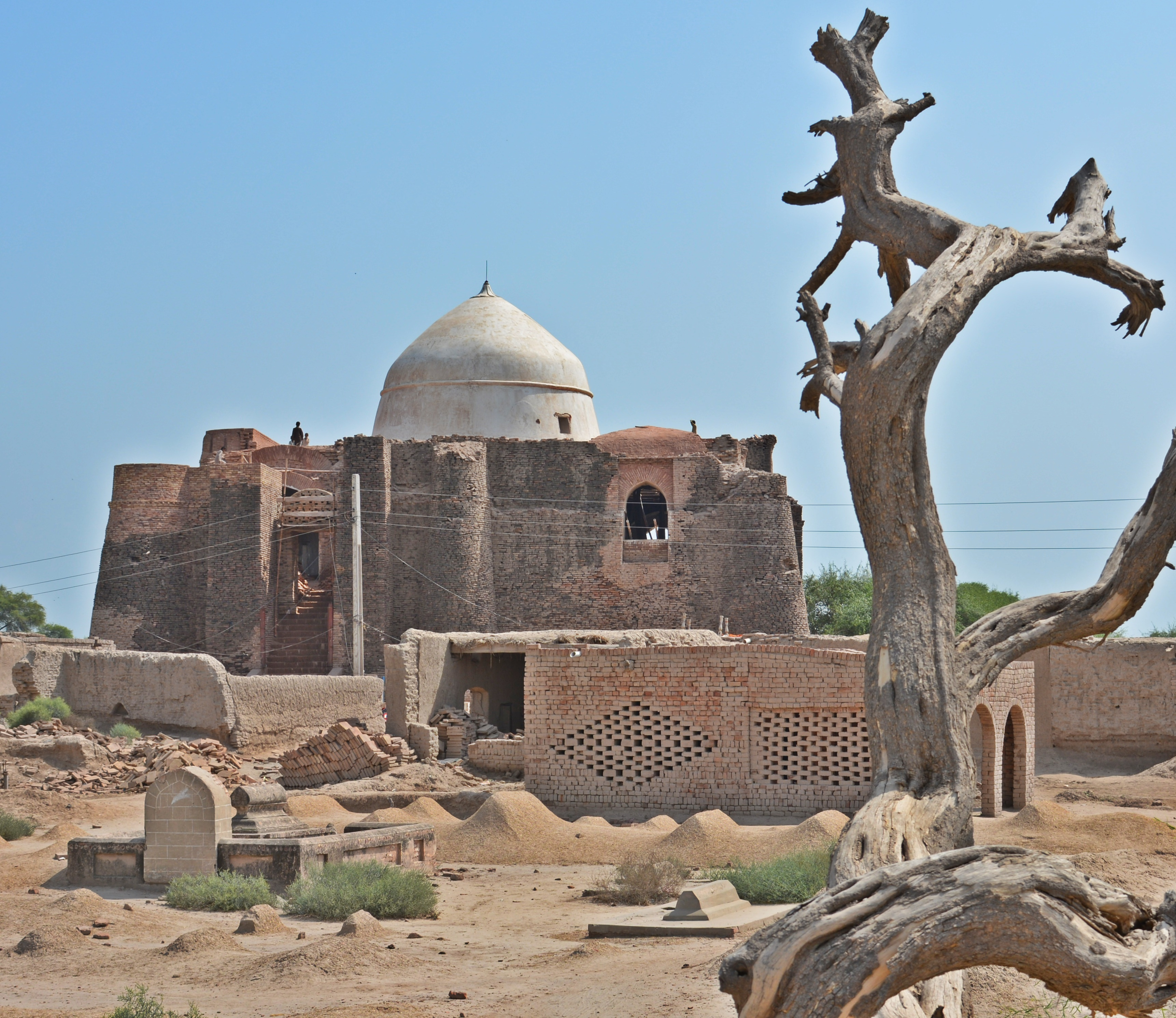
- The shrine may be the earliest Muslim funerary monument in South Asia.
- Interactive map of Shrine of Khalid Walid
- Location: near Kabirwala, Punjab, Pakistan
- Coordinates: 30.4768°N 71.7232°E
- Type: Sufi shrine
- Completion date: late 12th-early 13th century

The Shrine of Khalid Walid (Urdu: مقبره خالد وليد) is a Sufi shrine located in the village of Nawan Shehr, near the city of Kabirwala, in Punjab, Pakistan. The shrine is dedicated to the 12th-century warrior-saint Khaliq Walid, popularly known as Khalid Walid (not to be confused with the 7th-century Muslim Arab military commander Khalid ibn Walid). The shrine dates from the period of the medieval Delhi Sultanate, and may be the earliest Muslim funerary monument in South Asia. The shrine represents the first stage of evolution of funerary monuments in southern Punjab which would later culminate with the Tomb of Shah Rukn-e-Alam in Multan.

== History ==
The tomb dates from between the last quarter of the 12th century, and the early decades of the 13th century. The shrine bears an inscription stating that it was built by Ali bin Karamakh, who served as Governor of Multan during the reign of Muhammad of Ghor. The tomb was rediscovered and identified as the shrine of Khalid Walid by Dr Ahmad Nabi Khan and Kamil Khan.

== Architecture ==
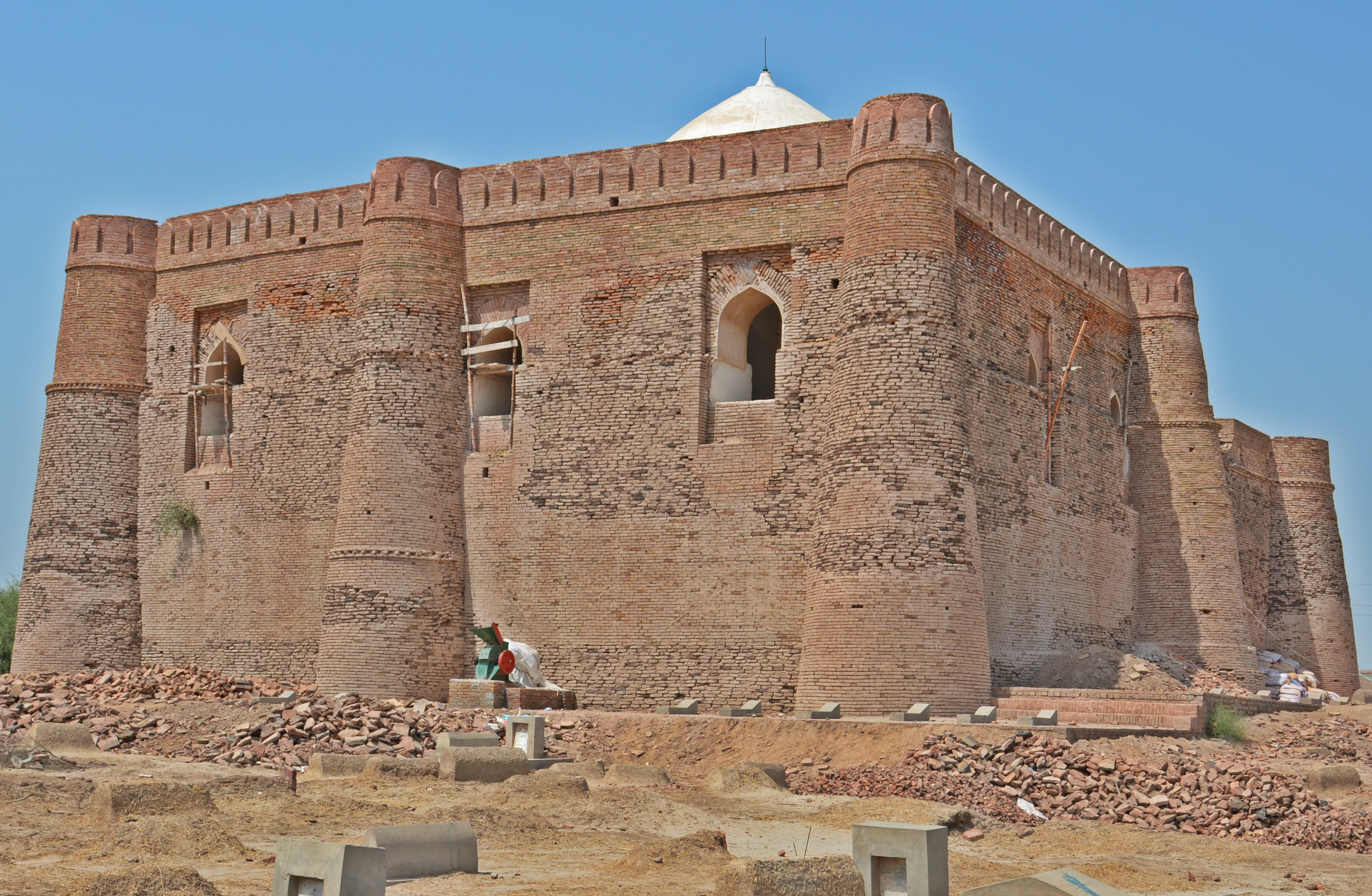
The shrine features elements of military architecture, such as bastions and crenellations.

=== Exterior ===
The shrine assumes the form of a fortified rectangle measuring 70 by 90 feet, and is capped by a low and sloped dome, with an exterior made of plain brick and inward sloping walls that may derive from Seljuk architecture from Central Asia. The use of wooden bands horizontally across the shrine, and use of both glazed and cut brick also represents the influence of Central Asian Seljuk architecture.

The shrine reflects elements of military architecture, with semicircular bastions in each of the shrine's corners, as well as in the middle of 3 of the 4 walls. The western wall of the shrine features a small projection, indicating the location of the mihrab. The roofline is decorated with crenellations - a feature commonly employed in fortified structures such as the Rohtas Fort. Similar influence of military architecture is found at the Tomb of Shah Rukn-e-Alam in Multan.

=== Interior ===
The shrine's interior is square shaped, measuring 24 feet on each side, with an entrance on each side that opens to vaulted galleries, and rectangular-shaped chambers on the east and west side of the shrine. The interior space is divided into a series of galleries. The shrine's interior walls are decorated with cut-brick designs. The shrine is notable for its exceptional mihrab made of cut and molded brick, decorated with Kufic calligraphy, capped with a hood similar to a baldachin. Decorative cut-brick patterns on the ornate mihrab differ from patterns on the rest of the shrine.
