= Abdul Hakeem, Pakistan =

Abdul Hakeem عبدُالحكِيم
- City
- Abdul Hakim railway station

- Location within Punjab, Pakistan Location within Pakistan
- Coordinates: 30°33′0″N 72°7′58″E
- Country: Pakistan
- Province: Punjab
- District: Khanewal District
- Tehsil: Kabirwala Tehsil
- Time zone: UTC+5 (PST)
  - Summer (DST): UTC+6 (PST (DST))
- Area code: 06524

Abdul Hakeem (also known as Abdul Hakim), (Urdu: عبدُالحکِیم), is a city in Kabirwala Tehsil, Khanewal District in the Punjab province of Pakistan.

== Location ==
The city is situated 10 kilometres from Tulamba, 3 km from the Ravi River and 28 km from Mian Channu. The tomb of Saint Abdul Hakeem is located in the city centre near Multan Road.

== Famous events ==
The famous event in the city is the yearly Urs of the saint Abdul Hakeem, held every year from 21 to 23 June. Thousands of the saint's followers visit the tomb during the Urs, and a grand Lok Mela takes place where the festivities include the Lucky Irani Circus.

== Colleges and schools ==
Abdul Hakeem has a number of schools and colleges including Dar-e-Arqam School, F.G. Public Schools, and Army Public School. The city has high schools for girls and boys and a degree college for both genders. There is also a vocational training centre for boys and girls. Now Virtual University of Pakistan's Abdul Hakim Campus (PABH01), Punjab group of colleges and Superior College also offer educational options for the students.

== Emergency medical services ==
In Abdul Hakeem City, is a rural health center run by the government of Punjab, and some private clinics, these clinics have the facility of many medical services e.g. dialysis, operations and gynaecology.

== History ==
Abdul Hakeem is also one of the historical city in the region. The city is named after Sufi Saint of Silsila Qadria descent Hazrat Sultan Abdul Hakim (R.A) who came to this place, settled here. The shrine of Sultan Abdul Hakeem is located in the start of City. The city is more than 300 years old.

== Economy ==
Important in the city is a 450 MW Rousch thermal power plant working at Sidhnai Barrage in Abdul Hakeem. The city has an old head-work on the historical river Ravi, and a canal named Fazil Shah and a small link canal that are used for irrigation.

The city has the one out of the 3 railway station situated in Kabirwala Tehsil, which is named 'Abdul Hakim', other 2 are named as #Dirkhana and 'Jan Muhammad Wala', while the other 3 Tehsils of Khanewal have one railway station each.

The population of the city depends on agriculture, and there are wheat، rice and cotton factories and flour mills in the city.

== Politics ==
The residents of this city do not adhere to any one political party. Every new election here is won by a different party.

== Transport ==
The latest development in the city is the junction interchange of the two motorways by CPEC, M3 (Lahore) & M4 (Pindi Bhattian) which will merge the two motorways and will lead to Shujabad near Multan and connect to M5 which will lead further to Sukkur (M6).

The Abdul Hakeem inter change on the Lahore Abdul Hakeem Motorway leads the traffic to Lahore and Islamabad.
