= Syed Hussain Jahania Gardezi =

Pakistani politician

Provincial Minister of Punjab for Agriculture
- In office 14 September 2020 – April 2022

Member of the Provincial Assembly of the Punjab
- In office 15 August 2018 – 14 January 2023
- Constituency: PP-204 Khanewal-II
- In office 29 May 2013 – 31 May 2018
- Constituency: PP-213 (Khanewal-II)

Personal details
- Born: 6 November 1956 (age 70) Multan, Punjab, Pakistan
- Party: PMLN (2025-present)
- Other political affiliations: IPP (2023-2025); PTI (2018-2023); PML(N) (2013-2018); IND (2008); PML(Q) (2008-2002); PPP (1990-1993)

Punjab Assembly Lahore

Syed Hussain Jahania Gardezi is a Pakistani politician who was the Provincial Minister of Punjab for Agriculture, in office from 13 September 2019 till April 2022. He had been a member of the Provincial Assembly of the Punjab from August 2018 till January 2023.

Previously, he was a Member of the Provincial Assembly of the Punjab between 1993 and May 2018.

== Early life and education ==
He was born on 6 November 1956 in Multan.

He has a degree of Matric which he obtained in 1980 from University of Agriculture Faisalabad. He has received a Diploma (L.G) from Foreign Ministry Institute, Denmark in 1993.

== Political career ==
He ran for the seat of the Provincial Assembly of the Punjab as a candidate of Pakistan Democratic Alliance from Constituency PP-174 (Khanewal-I) in the 1990 Pakistani general election but was unsuccessful. He received 19,005 votes and lost the seat to a candidate of Islami Jamhoori Ittehad (IJI).

He was elected to the Provincial Assembly of the Punjab as an independent candidate from Constituency PP-174 (Khanewal-I) in the 1993 Pakistani general election. He received 16,191 and defeated a candidate of Pakistan Peoples Party (PPP). During his tenure as member of the Provincial Assembly of the Punjab, he served as Provincial Minister of Punjab for Cooperatives.

He was re-elected to the Provincial Assembly of the Punjab as a candidate of National Alliance from Constituency PP-213 (Khanewal-II) in the 2002 Pakistani general election. He received 26,462 votes and defeated a candidate of Pakistan Muslim League (Q) (PML-Q). In January 2003, he was inducted into the provincial Punjab cabinet of Chief Minister Chaudhry Pervaiz Elahi and was made Provincial Minister of Punjab for Non-formal Urban Education. In 2006, he was made Provincial Minister of Punjab for Food. During his tenure as member of the Provincial Assembly of the Punjab, he also served as Provincial Minister of Punjab for Local Government.

He ran for the seat of the Provincial Assembly of the Punjab as a candidate of PML-Q from Constituency PP-213 (Khanewal-II) in the 2008 Pakistani general election but was unsuccessful. He received 22,379 votes and lost the seat to a candidate of PPP.

He was re-elected to the Provincial Assembly of the Punjab as an independent candidate from Constituency PP-213 (Khanewal-II) in the 2013 Pakistani general election. He joined Pakistan Muslim League (N) in May 2013.

He was re-elected to Provincial Assembly of the Punjab as an independent candidate from Constituency PP-204 (Khanewal-II) in the 2018 Pakistani general election.

On 28 July 2018, he joined Pakistan Tehreek-e-Insaf (PTI).

On 12 September 2018, he was inducted into the provincial Punjab cabinet of Chief Minister Sardar Usman Buzdar. On 13 September 2018, he was appointed Provincial Minister of Punjab for Management and Professional Development.

As of 16 September 2019, he has been serving as the Provincial Minister for Agriculture in Punjab.
