= Kabirwala =

City in Punjab, Pakistan

Kabirwala كبِير والا
- City
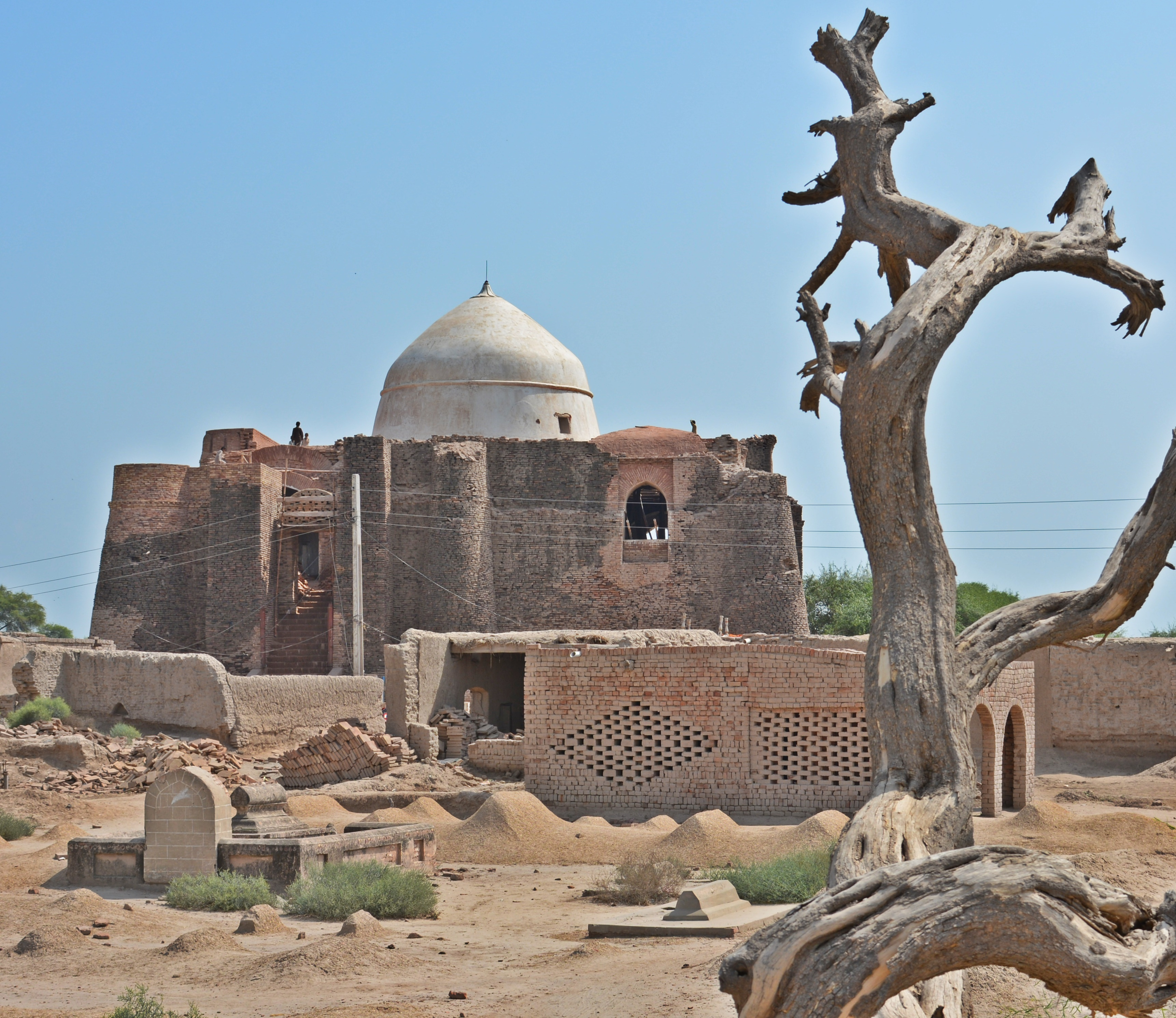
- The 12th-century shrine of the warrior-saint Khalid Walid is located near Kabirwala

- Location within Punjab, Pakistan Location within Pakistan
- Coordinates: 30.20°N 70.43°E
- Country: Pakistan
- Province: Punjab
- District: Khanewal
- Tehsil: Kabirwala

Government
  - Type: Municipal Committee

Population (2023)
  - City: 91,932
  - Rank: 139th in Pakistan
- Time zone: UTC+5 (PST)
- Number of Union councils: 8

Kabirwala (Urdu: کبِیروالا, Punjabi كبِير والا) is a city of Khanewal District in the Punjab province of Pakistan. The city is the headquarters of Kabirwala Tehsil, an administrative subdivision of Khanewal District. The population of the town of Kabirwala was 91,932, according to the 2023 Population Census of Pakistan, with the overall population of Kabirwala tehsil being 1,119,229.

== Location ==
Kabirwala's geographical coordinates are 30°20'10" North, 70°43'30" East. It is one of four tehsils in Khanewal District. Kabirwala lies 10 km north of the district capital Khanewal on the Multan-Jhang road. Kabirwala is a city north 40 km from Multan city.

== History ==
The city is named Kabirwala after Baba Pir Kabir, who lived in the area. Kabirwala was part of Multan until restructuring made the largest sub division of Khanewal district. Sirai Sidhu, a historic city, used to be the tehsil headquarters of the whole district Khanewal, before 1937. During British rule, Kabirwala was the northernmost tehsil of Multan District, Punjab – the boundaries were larger than today lying between 30°5' and 30°45'N. and 71°35' and 72°36' E., with an area of 1,603 square miles (4,150 km^{2}). The population in 1901 was 130,507 compared with 113,412 in 1891. It then contained the town of Tulamba (population in 1901 – 2526) and 320 villages, including Kabirwala, the headquarters. The land revenue and cesses in 1913-4 amounted to 520,000. The Ravi runs through the northern portion of the tehsil to its junction with the Chenab in the north-west corner. The north and west portions were irrigated by the Sidhnai Canal, while the south consisted of uncultivated Bar Jungle.

During the period of British rule it existed as a sub-division of the Multan district and had an annual revenue of over half a million Rupees.

== Demographics ==
Population

Historical population

Year	Pop.	±%
1972	12,287	—
1981	22,141	+80.2%
1998	47,455	+114.3%

Year	Pop.	±%
2017	74,699	+57.4%
2023	91,932	+23.1%

According to the 2023 census, Kabirwala city has a population of 91,932.

Religion and Culture

The Kabirwala area is a land of diverse religions and culture. Along with the tombs of Muslim Sufi saints, there are also Hindu places of worship. The Kabirwala city being the seat of Baba Pir Kabir, the historic tomb of Khalid Walid, in Mauza Khati Chore along Multan – Sarai Sidhu Road, 24 km to the west of Kabirwala city is located. The tomb of the saint Abdul Hakim is also located in this area in a sub tehsil city of Abdul Hakim. The tomb of the saint Ali Sher Bhutta Naqshbandi is also located in this city. The mausoleum was built very recently on the site where Ali Sher used to meet his disciples and help people, both locals and those from further afield.

Languages

Languages of Kabirwala city (2023 Census)
1. Punjabi (51.1%)
2. Saraiki (37.3%)
3. Urdu (11.0%)
4. Others (0.60%)

== Production, processing and trade ==
Nestlé has chosen Kabirwala as the site for its largest Asian milk processing plant, on the same road, having purchased the Kabirwala Dairy Limited in the 1990s. Reportedly, the plant has a processing capacity of two million litres of milk a day, which is set to rise to three million in the near future. Nestlé, through the network of its milk collection centres spread all over the province of Punjab, collects milk from over 140,000 dairy farmers.

== Communication and transport ==
Kabirwala is located at the crossroads of several important routes. It links south with north of Pakistan. All the transport from the Sindh province, Dera Ghazi Khan, Muzaffargarh, Rahim Yar Khan, Bahawalpur, Multan to the Jhang, Sargodha and Islamabad has to pass through Kabirwala. There are two bus stands; the old one is located at the western edge of the city along the Multan Road, and the new one is located on the southern edge of the city along the Khanewal Road. Apart from the offices of bus companies, these bus stands also house the offices of trucking, logistics, and cargo companies.

== Notable people ==
- Har Gobind Khorana, the joint winner of the Nobel Prize for Medicine (1968) was born here in 1922.
- Fakhar Imam, was the 11th Speaker of the National Assembly of Pakistan.
