= Khanewal District =

District in Punjab, Pakistan

Khanewal District ضلع خانیوال
- District of Punjab
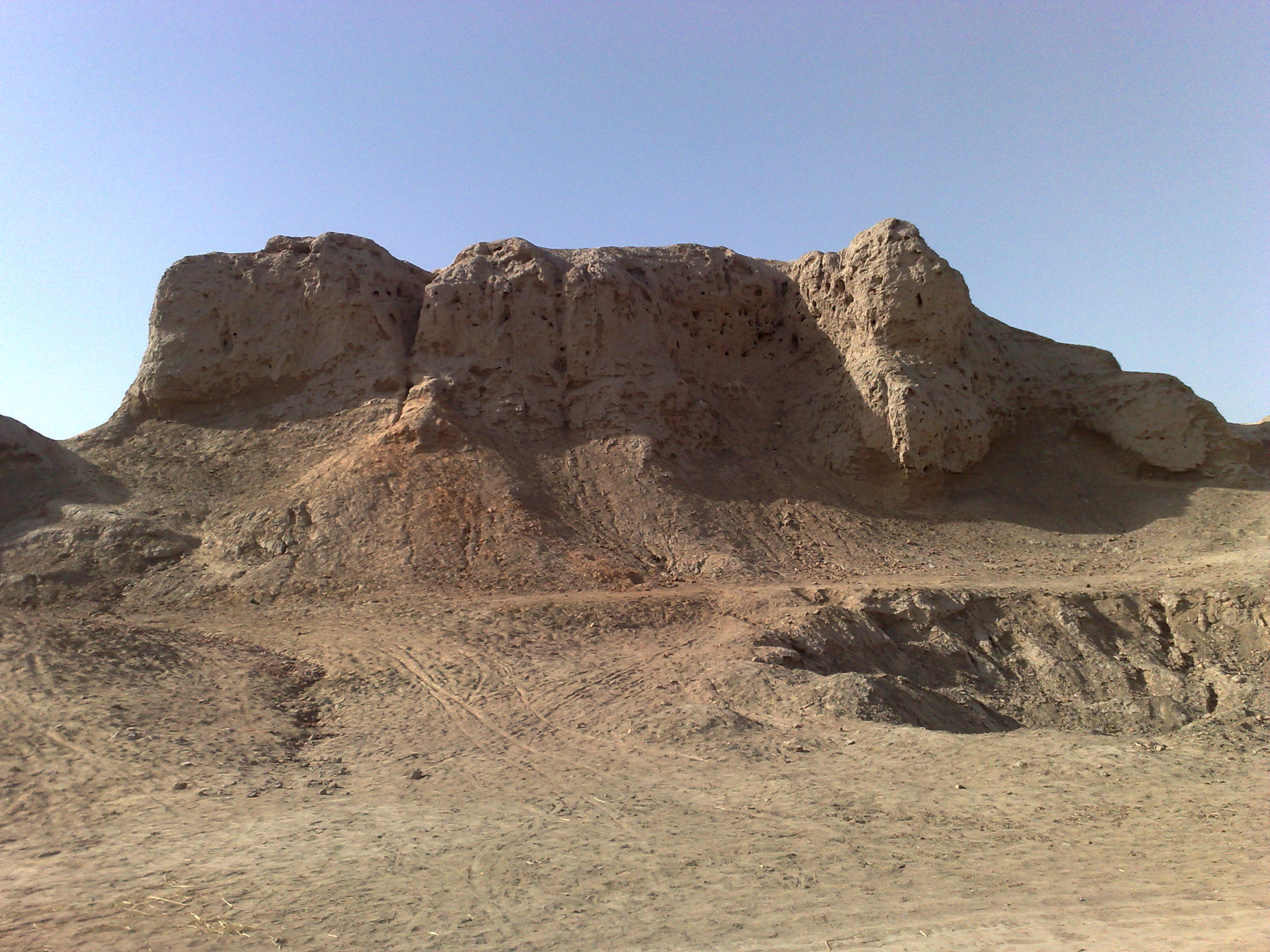
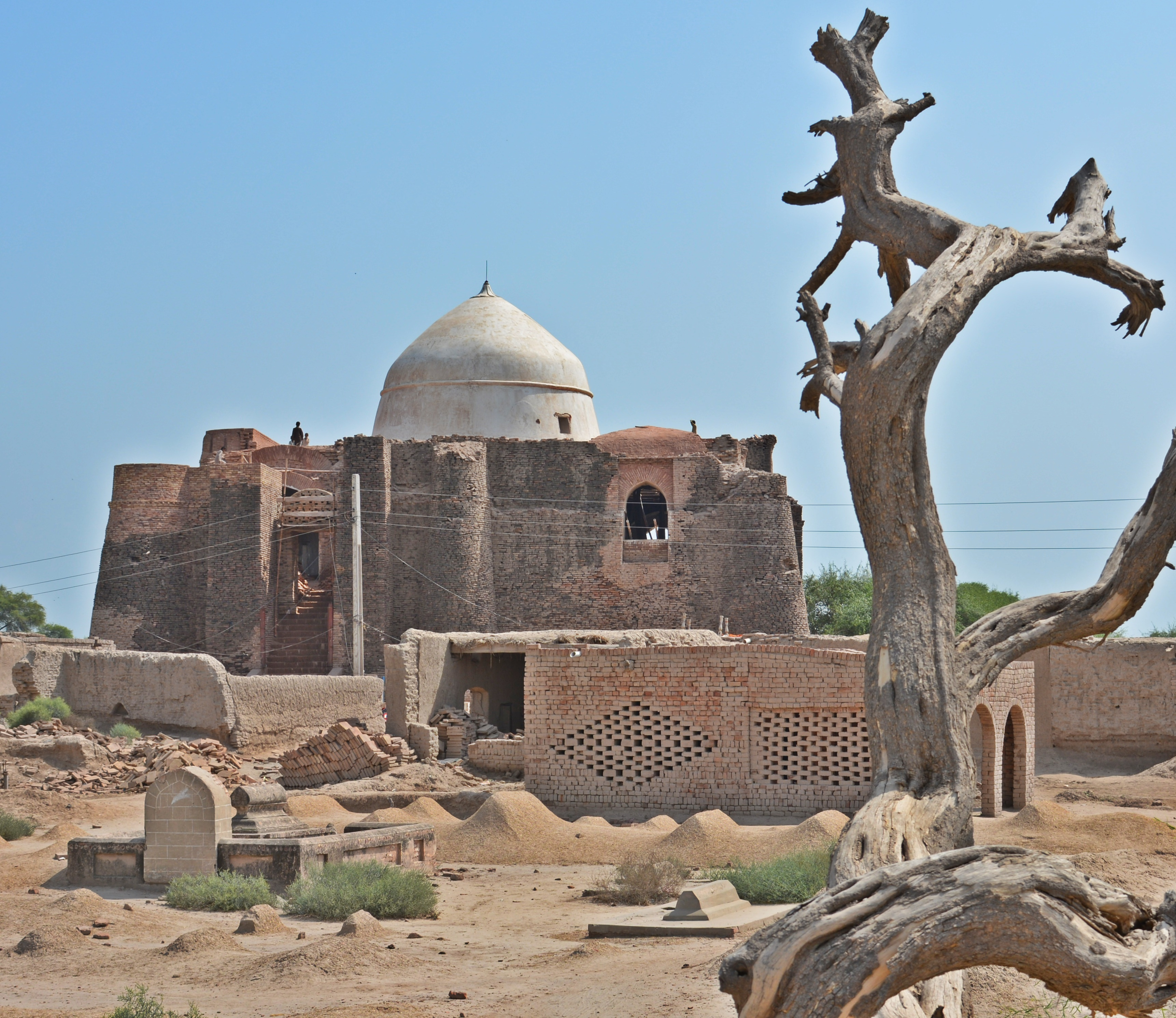
- Top: Ruins of Old Tulamba; Bottom: Shrine in Kabirwala

- Location of Khanewal District (highlighted in orange) in Punjab
- Country: Pakistan
- Province: Punjab
- Division: Multan
- Headquarters: Khanewal

Government
  - Type: District Administration
  - Deputy Commissioner: Salim Hamind Sindhu
  - District Police Officer: Rana Umar Farooq
  - District Health Officer: Dr. Abdul Majeed District Education Officer

Area
  - District of Punjab: 4,349 km^{2} (1,679 sq mi)

Population (2023)
  - District of Punjab: 3,364,077
  - Density: 773.5/km^{2} (2,003/sq mi)
  - Urban: 716,786
  - Rural: 2,647,291

Literacy
  - Literacy rate: Total: (60.97%); Male: (69.26%); Female: (52.18%)
- Time zone: UTC+5 (PST)
- Area code: 065
- Number of Tehsils: 4
- Website: khanewal.punjab.gov.pk

Khanewal District (Urdu and Punjabi: ضلع خانیوال Zilā khānēvāla) is a district of the Punjab province of Pakistan. According to the 1998 census of Pakistan, the district had a population of 2,068,490, of which 17.42% was urban. Khanewal is located at latitude and longitude 30°18' and 71°55'0E respectively with an altitude of 128 metres.

== Administrative divisions ==
For the purpose of administration, District Khanewal is divided into 4 tehsils i.e. Khanewal, Mian Channu, Jahanian and Kabirwala and 168 union councils including 114 rural and 54 urban whose elected representatives formulate the district and Tehsil councils.

The district comprises 4 constituencies of the National Assembly and 7 of the Provincial Assembly of the Punjab. The district contains four tehsils which are as following:

Tehsil	Area (km²)	Pop. (2023)	Density (ppl/km²) (2023)	Literacy rate (2023)	Union Councils
Jahanian	549	384,822	700.95	65.65%	...
Kabirwala	1,804	1,119,229	620.42	54.13%	...
Khanewal	784	987,445	1,259.50	63.60%	...
Mian Channu	1,212	872,581	719.95	64.39%	...

== Geography ==
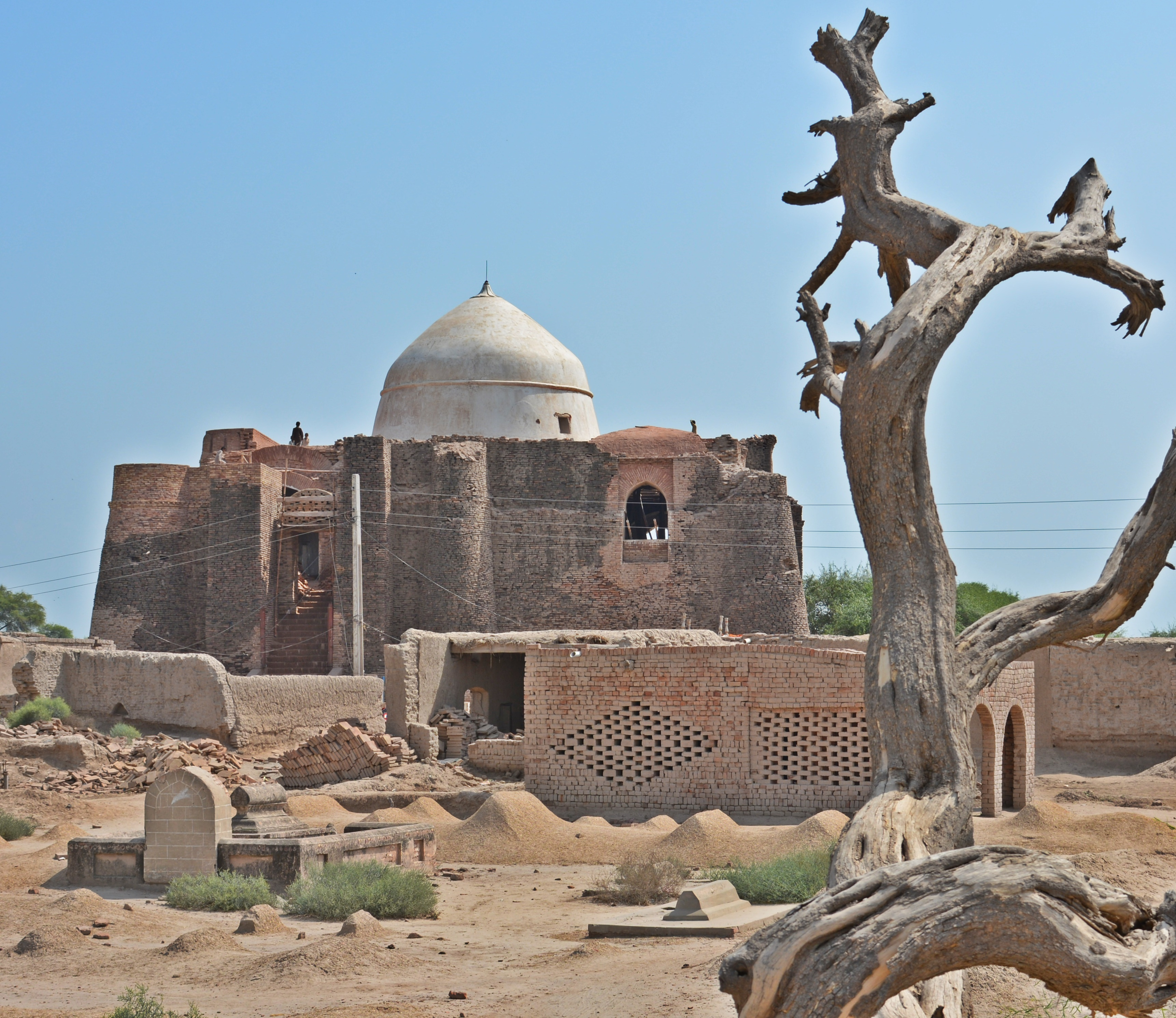
The shrine of Khalid Walid near Kabirwala.

Khanewal district is located at an average elevation of 130 metres above sea level with highest elevation of 252 metres at the town of Attari. This district is situated in the center of the country at an almost equal distance from Karachi and Peshawar and on the main routes of the railway and the Grand Trunk Road. It is also connected to Lahore Multan motorway. The district is bounded on the north by Jhang District and Toba Tek Singh District; on the south by Vehari District; on the east by Sahiwal District and on the west by Multan.

== Climate ==
Climate data for Khanewal District
Month	Jan	Feb	Mar	Apr	May	Jun	Jul	Aug	Sep	Oct	Nov	Dec	Year
Record high °C (°F)	28.3 (82.9)	32.0 (89.6)	39.0 (102.2)	45.0 (113.0)	46.9 (116.4)	48.0 (118.4)	48.2 (118.8)	45.0 (113.0)	42.5 (108.5)	40.6 (105.1)	36.0 (96.8)	29.0 (84.2)	48.2 (118.8)
Mean daily maximum °C (°F)	21.0 (69.8)	23.2 (73.8)	28.5 (83.3)	35.5 (95.9)	40.4 (104.7)	42.3 (108.1)	39.2 (102.6)	38.0 (100.4)	37.2 (99.0)	34.6 (94.3)	28.5 (83.3)	22.7 (72.9)	32.6 (90.7)
Daily mean °C (°F)	12.7 (54.9)	15.4 (59.7)	21.0 (69.8)	27.5 (81.5)	32.4 (90.3)	35.5 (95.9)	33.9 (93.0)	33.0 (91.4)	31.0 (87.8)	26.4 (79.5)	19.7 (67.5)	14.1 (57.4)	25.2 (77.4)
Mean daily minimum °C (°F)	4.5 (40.1)	7.6 (45.7)	13.5 (56.3)	19.5 (67.1)	24.4 (75.9)	28.6 (83.5)	28.7 (83.7)	28.0 (82.4)	24.9 (76.8)	18.2 (64.8)	10.9 (51.6)	5.5 (41.9)	17.9 (64.1)
Record low °C (°F)	−2.2 (28.0)	−1 (30)	3.3 (37.9)	9.4 (48.9)	13.5 (56.3)	20.0 (68.0)	21.1 (70.0)	21.1 (70.0)	16.7 (62.1)	8.9 (48.0)	0.6 (33.1)	−1.1 (30.0)	−2.2 (28.0)
Average precipitation mm (inches)	7.2 (0.28)	9.5 (0.37)	19.5 (0.77)	12.9 (0.51)	9.8 (0.39)	12.3 (0.48)	61.3 (2.41)	32.6 (1.28)	10.8 (0.43)	1.7 (0.07)	2.3 (0.09)	6.9 (0.27)	186.8 (7.35)
Mean monthly sunshine hours	222.3	211.6	250.8	273.3	293.5	266.8	265.0	277.6	277.6	274.9	255.0	229.2	3,097.6
Source: NOAA (1961–1990)

== Demographics ==
Historical population
Year	Pop.	±% p.a.
1951	635,482	—
1961	774,701	+2.00%
1972	1,067,993	+2.96%
1981	1,369,766	+2.80%
1998	2,068,490	+2.45%
2017	2,920,233	+1.83%
2023	3,364,077	+2.39%

As of the 2023 census, Khanewal district has 526,196 households and a population of 3,364,077. The district has a sex ratio of 106.48 males to 100 females and a literacy rate of 60.97%: 69.26% for males and 52.18% for females. 907,441 (26.98% of the surveyed population) are under 10 years of age. 716,786 (21.31%) live in urban areas.

Religion in Khanewal district (2023)
Religion	Percent
Islam	98.15%
Christianity	1.81%
Other or not stated	0.04%

Religion in contemporary Khanewal District
Religious group	1941		2017		2023	
Religious group	Pop.	%	Pop.	%	Pop.	%
Islam	340,197	75.49%	2,869,424	98.26%	3,301,411	98.15%
Hinduism (Note: 1941 census: Including Ad-Dharmis)	70,775	15.7%	297	0.01%	304	0.01%
Sikhism	30,176	6.7%	—N/a	—N/a	46	0%
Christianity	9,361	2.08%	49,430	1.69%	60,920	1.81%
Ahmadi	—N/a	—N/a	965	0.03%	748	0.02%
Others (Note: Including Jainism, Buddhism, Zoroastrianism, Judaism, or not stated)	155	0.03%	117	0%	160	0%
Total Population	450,664	100%	2,920,233	100%	3,363,589	100%
Note: 1941 census data is for Khanewal and Kabirwala tehsils of Multan District, which roughly corresponds to contemporary Khanewal district. District and tehsil borders have changed since 1941.

Languages of Khanewal district (2023)
1. Punjabi (70.4%)
2. Saraiki (19.4%)
3. Urdu (8.05%)
4. Pashto (1.09%)
5. Others (1.04%)

At the time of the 2023 census, 70.41% of the population spoke Punjabi, 19.41% Saraiki, 8.05% Urdu and 1.09% Pashto as their first language.

According to the census of 1998, Punjabi is the most widely spoken first language, accounting for 81% of the population. Urdu was the native language of 7.8% (although almost all of the inhabitants of the district use it as a second language), Saraiki is native to 5.8% and Pashto – to 1.1%.

The main tribes and clans include: Niazi Afghans, Daduana, Khichi, Kamboh, Matyana, Gujjar, Doltana, Sahu, Rajputs (Rana), Rajpoot Dhudhi, Awan, Sheikh, Jatt, Bucha, Nikyana Sial, Siyal, Arain, Bhati, Baloch, Khokhars Mayo Solgi (Jutt) and Toru.

== Education ==
The education system in Khanewal district is formulated along specific modern, religious, cultural, social, psychological, commerce and scientific injunctions. The current literacy rate of district is 39.9%. The standard national system of education is mainly inspired from the British system. The system also aims to imbibe a secular outlook among the students with the awareness of the rich cultural heritage of Pakistan. Khanewal district has wide range of schools, colleges and universities that caters to diverse streams.

The system is divided into five levels: primary (grades one through five); middle (grades six through eight); high (grades nine and ten, leading to the Secondary School Certificate); intermediate (grades eleven and twelve, leading to a Higher Secondary School Certificate); and university programs leading to graduate and advanced degrees.

Khanewal district, like majority of the districts in Pakistan has both public and private educational institutions from primary to university level. Most educational institutions are gender based from primary to university level.

All academic education institutions are the responsibility of the provincial governments. The federal government mostly assists in curriculum development, accreditation and some financing of research.

== Notable people ==
- Syed Hussain Jahania Gardezi, Pakistani politician, who is currently serving as 'Provincial Minister of Punjab for Management and Professional Development'
- Tasawar Hayat, Pakistani scientist.
- Syed Fakhar Imam, Ex. Speaker National Assembly of Pakistan
- Tariq Jamil, Islamic Scholar
- Har Gobind Khorana, Indian American Nobel Prize winner for Medicine.
- Ghulam Haider Wyne, Ex. Chief Minister of Punjab

== Villages ==
- Chak 96/10-R
- Chak 138/10-R
- Chak 15/9-R Sahuan Wala
- Chak 14/9-R Batian Wala
- Chak 7/9-R Rehman Garh
- Chak 14/8-R Gulabad
- Chak 17/9-R Janat Pur
- Chak 13/9-R Dangra Wala
- Chak 16/9-R
- Chak 8/9-R Qasba
- Chak 9/9-R Sargana Wala
- Chak 4/9-R Daulat Pur
- Chak 5/9-R Yaroo Wala
- Malikpur
- 5 kassi

Chak no 133/10-r Rana Abdul Ghaffar s/o Siraj ul din Numberdar

== See also ==
- Khanewal
- Khanewal Tehsil
- Khanewal Junction railway station
