= 2010 Toulouse Olympique season =

- Challenge Cup: Round 4, knocked out by St. Helens

Team information
- Chairman: Carlos Zalduendo
- Coach: Gilles Dumas
- Captain: Éric Anselme
- Stadium: Stade des Minimes
- Avg. attendance: 1,905 (Average Home attendance as of 18 April 2010)
← 2009	2011 →

2010 is the second year of participation to the Championship for the TO. The team loses few players with Damien Couturier, Matthieu Almarcha, Jean-Christophe Borlin and Olivier Pramil leaving. On the other hand, they keep Yoan Tisseyre and Carlos Mendes Varela arrived in the summer 2009 and who played few games last season. They also sign Simon Worrall from the Leeds Rhinos on loan for one year and Vincent Duport from the Catalans Dragons. They also welcome Romain Mencarini from the UTC (Catalans Dragons reserve team in the French Championship).

== Table ==
2010 Co-operative Championship
Pos	Team	Pld	W	D	L	PF	PA	PD	BP	Pts	Qualification or relegation
1	Featherstone Rovers	20	18	0	2	735	334	+401	2	56	Qualified for the Play-offs
2	Halifax	20	16	0	4	684	509	+175	2	50	Qualified for the Play-offs
3	Leigh Centurions	20	12	1	7	580	403	+177	5	43	Qualified for the Play-offs
4	Barrow Raiders	20	12	1	7	607	449	+158	1	39	Qualified for the Play-offs
5	Widnes Vikings	20	11	0	9	619	488	+131	5	38	Qualified for the Play-offs
6	Sheffield Eagles	20	10	1	9	503	555	−52	1	33	Qualified for the Play-offs
7	Batley Bulldogs	20	7	0	13	479	488	−9	8	29	
8	Toulouse Olympique	20	8	0	12	486	649	−163	3	27	
9	Dewsbury Rams	20	6	0	14	454	503	−49	8	26	
10	Whitehaven (R)	20	4	0	16	281	707	−426	4	16	Relegation position
11	Keighley Cougars (R)	20	4	1	15	362	703	−341	−4	10 (Note: Keighley had 5 bonus points, but started the season on −9 points for going into administration.)	Relegation position

Updated to match(es) played on 25 August 2010 (1:12pm). Source:
Rules for classification: 1st on competition points; 2nd on match points difference.
Competition points: For win = 3; For draw = 2; For loss by 12 points or fewer = 1.
(R) Relegated

== Fixtures and results ==
Competition	Round	Opponent	Result	Score	Home/Away	Venue	Attendance	Date		Photos
Friendly		Catalans Dragons	Loss	22–46	Home	Stade des Minimes	4,128	23 January 2010	Highlights Full	1
Friendly		Limoux Grizzlies	Loss	28–18	Away	Stade de l'Aiguille	900	30 January 2010		
Friendly		Saint-Gaudens Bears	Win	14–26	Away	Stade Jules Ribet		19 February 2010		1
Co-operative Championship	1	Dewsbury Rams	Win	26–22	Home	Stade des Minimes	850	27 February 2010	Highlights	1 2
Challenge Cup	3	Keighley Cougars	Win	26–35	Away	Cougar Park	543	6 March 2010	Highlights	
Co-operative Championship	2	Whitehaven	Loss	34–20	Away	Recreation Ground	1,181	13 March 2010		
Co-operative Championship	3	Keighley Cougars	Win	34–26	Home	Stade des Minimes	1,823	20 March 2010		
Co-operative Championship	4	Barrow Raiders	Loss	16–48	Home	Stade des Minimes	1,500	27 March 2010		
Co-operative Championship	5	Leigh Centurions	Loss	6–36	Home	Stade des Minimes	1,225	2 April 2010		
Co-operative Championship	6	Halifax	Loss	50–6	Away	The Shay	1,750	5 April 2010		
Co-operative Championship	7	Widnes Vikings	Win	36–42	Away	Stobart Stadium Halton	2,793	10 April 2010		
Challenge Cup	4	St. Helens	Loss	56–16	Away	GPW Recruitment Stadium	4,043	17 April 2010		
Co-operative Championship	8	Featherstone Rovers			Away	Post Office Road		22 April 2010		
Co-operative Championship	9	Batley Bulldogs	Win	20–12	Home	Stade des Minimes	2,500	1 May 2010		
Co-operative Championship	10	Sheffield Eagles			Away	Bramall Lane		15 May 2010		
Co-operative Championship	11	Featherstone Rovers			Home	Stade des Minimes		22 May 2010		
Co-operative Championship	12	Batley Bulldogs			Away	Mount Pleasant		29 May 2010		
Co-operative Championship	13	Whitehaven			Home	Stade des Minimes		26 June 2010		
Co-operative Championship	14	Dewsbury Rams			Away	The Tetley's Stadium		4 July 2010		
Co-operative Championship	15	Sheffield Eagles			Home	Stade des Minimes		10 July 2010		
Co-operative Championship	16	Keighley Cougars			Away	Cougar Park		24 July 2010		
Co-operative Championship	17	Barrow Raiders			Away	Craven Park		31 July 2010		
Co-operative Championship	18	Widnes Vikings			Home	Stade des Minimes		7 August 2010		
Co-operative Championship	19	Leigh Centurions			Away	Leigh Sports Village		14 August 2010		
Co-operative Championship	20	Halifax			Home	Stade des Minimes		21 August 2010		

== Match Reports ==
=== Co-operative Championship Round 1: vs. Dewsbury ===
Round 1: 28 February 2010; Co-operative Championship 2010	Toulouse Olympique	(10) 26–22 (12)	Dewsbury Rams	Toulouse, France
14:30 GMT	Tries: R Bromley (2); S Planas (1); V Duport (1); J Tisseyre (1); Goals: N Wynn (3)		Tries: S Turner (2); M Emmett (1); A Bostock (1); Goals: P Walker (3)	Stadium: Stade des Minimes; Attendance: 850; Referee: Peter Brook (Field)

Toulouse Kick Start the season!

In a perfect start to the season Rory Bromley bagged a brace of tries for Toulouse in their 26–22 Co-operative Championship win over the Dewsbury Rams. Vincent Duport, Johan Tisseyre and Sebastien Planas all scored against the West Yorkshire outfit and Olympique came from 22 to 14 down to clinch the victory. Scott Turner scored two second-half tries for the hapless Rams, but these could do nothing to alter the overall result.

=== Co-operative Championship Round 2: vs. Whitehaven ===
Round 2: 13 March 2010; Co-operative Championship 2010	Whitehaven	(10) 34–20 (20)	Toulouse Olympique	Whitehaven, Cumbria
18:00 GMT	Tries: I Mort (1); C Rudd (1); D Skee (1); C Sice (2); R Fox (1); Goals: C Rudd (5)		Tries: R Bromley (1); B Ormeno (1); S Planas (1); A Maria (1); Goals: N Wynn (2)	Stadium: Recreation Ground; Attendance: 1,181; Referee: Jamie Leahy (Field)

Toulouse squander their lead

Whitehaven opened their Co-operative Championship campaign with a 34–20 victory over Toulouse at the Recreation Ground in Cumbria. Toulouse Olympique held an impressive 20–10 lead at the break, but let it slip away thanks to tries from a transformed Whitehaven outfit. Dylan Skee and Carl Rudd crossed for the home side in the first half, Whitehaven then hit back after the break with tries from Carl Sice (2), Reece Fox and Ian Mort. Carl Rudd kicked 5 conversions for the home team. Toulouse tries came from Rory Bromley, Antoni Maria, Bruno Ormeno and Julien Lasserre and four points from the boot of Nathan Wynn.

=== Co-operative Championship Round 3: vs. Keighley ===
Round 3: 20 March 2010; Co-operative Championship 2010	Toulouse Olympique	(14) 34–26 (4)	Keighley Cougars	Toulouse, France
17:00 GMT	Tries: R Bromley (1); C Bienes (1); J Lasserre (1); C Gay (2); K Larroyer (1); Goals: N Wynn (5)		Tries: G Duffy (1); D Jones (1); J Feather (1); C Baines (1); O Pursglove (1); Goals: D Jones (3)	Stadium: Stade des Minimes; Attendance: 1,823; Referee: Warren Turley (Field)

Olympique beat the Cougars

Toulouse outscored Keighley by six tries to five in a 34–26 Co-operative Championship victory in Toulouse, France. Cedric Gay scored two times for Olympique while Clement Bienes, Rory Bromley, Sebastien Planas and Kevin Larroyer all crossed the try line for a try apiece. To add to this display of teamwork Nathan Wynn kicked five goals. The Cougars came back with a strong second half display, tries came from Danny Jones (1), Oliver Pursglove(1), Gavin Duffy (1), Chris Baines (1) and James Feather (1), but walked away as the losers

=== Co-operative Championship Round 4: vs. Barrow ===
Round 4: 27 March 2010; Co-operative Championship 2010	Toulouse Olympique	(16) 16–48 (16)	Barrow Raiders	Toulouse, France
18:00 GMT	Tries: C Gay (1); A Maria (1); K Larroyer (1); Goals: N Wynn (2)		Tries: A Ballard 1; A Blackwood (1); L Harrison (1); A Henderson (1); M James (1); Z Luisi (1); L Campbell (3); Goals: J Rooney (6)	Stadium: Stade des Minimes; Attendance: 1,500; Referee: Gareth Hewer (Field)

Disappointment for Toulouse in Raiders victory

A second-half hat-trick of tries from substitute Liam Campbell helped defending champions Barrow Raiders to a 48–16 win over Toulouse. Olympique were level at 16–16 at half-time thanks to tries from Antoni Maria, Cedric Gay and Kevin Larroyer and two goals from Nathan Wynn in response to Raiders touchdowns from Matt James, Andrew Henderson and Zeb Luisi. However, the visitors cut loose in the second half, scrum half Campbell scoring a 16-minute treble and other tries coming from Liam Harrison, Anthony Blackwood and Andy Ballard, while Jamie Rooney took his goal tally to six from nine attempts.

=== Co-operative Championship Round 5: vs. Leigh ===
Round 5: 2 April 2010; Co-operative Championship 2010	Toulouse Olympique	(0) 6–36 (18)	Leigh Centurions	Toulouse, France
19:00 GMT	Tries: P Pelo (1); Goals: N Wynn (1)		Tries: S Donlan (1); N Stanton (1); D McConnell (1); M Leuluai (1); D Armitstead (1); A Higson (1); Goals: M Nanyn (6)	Stadium: Stade des Minimes; Attendance: 1,225; Player of the Match: John Duffy (Leigh Centurions)

Big loss for Olympique

The fans left disappointed, the Super League hopefuls showed little of the form that has earned them impressive victories earlier in the season. Leigh followed up their 48–10 win at Halifax with a 36–6 victory over Toulouse in the south of France to stay just a point behind Featherstone in the Co-operative Championship table. Even without Tyrone McCarthy, Lee Mitchell and Matty Blythe, who were all recalled by Warrington, the Centurions had little trouble collecting a fourth successive win. Macgraff Leuluai, Dave McConnell, David Armitstead, Nicky Stanton, Stuart Donlan and Adam Higson scored the visitors' tries and Mick Nanyn kicked all six conversions. Substitute Patellsio Pelo scored a consolation try for Toulouse just before the end.

=== Co-operative Championship Round 6: vs. Halifax ===
Round 6: 5 April 2010; Co-operative Championship 2010	Halifax RLFC	(16) 50–6 (6)	Toulouse Olympique	Halifax, West Yorkshire
18:00 GMT	Tries: S Royston (3); L Paterson (2); R Worrincy (1); J Hayley (2); F Watene (1); Goals: L Paterson (7)		Tries: R Bromley (1); Goals: N Wynn (1)	Stadium: the Shay; Attendance: 1,725

Halifax trounce Toulouse

Halifax overpowered Toulouse Olympique 50–6 in the Cooperative Championship game at The Shay. Halifax's Shad Royston claimed a hat-trick; Lee Paterson and James Haley also grabbed doubles and Rob Worrincy and Frank Watene also touched down for the West Yorkshire side. Paterson added seven goals for 'Fax while the French side's solitary try came from Rory Bromley.

=== Co-operative Championship Round 7: vs. Widnes ===
Round 7: 10 April 2010; Co-operative Championship 2010	Widnes Vikings	(12) 36–42 (30)	Toulouse Olympique	Widnes, Cheshire
18:00 GMT	Tries: P Flynn (1); A Thackeray (3); B Davies (1); M Strong (1); T Coyle (1); Goals: S Grady (5)		Tries: V Duport (3); N Wynn (2); M Griffi (1); S Payan (1); Goals: N Wynn (7)	Stadium: Stobart Stadium; Attendance: 2,793

Stunning result for Toulouse

Toulouse claimed Widnes' scalp as they ran out 42–36 winners in an enjoyable Co-operative Championship encounter at the Stobart Stadium on Saturday. Widnes had a late surge in the closing stages with Anthony Thackeray scoring a hat-trick in the final 20 minutes alone. But the French side had done enough in the first hour with tries from Mathieu Griffi, Vincent Duport (two), Nathan Wynn (two) and Sebastien Payan sealing success.

=== Carnegie Challenge Cup round 4: vs. St Helens ===
Round 4: 17 April 2010; Carnegie Challenge Cup 2010	St Helens	(26) 56–16 (10)	Toulouse Olympique	St. Helens, Merseyside
	Tries: A Gardner (1); C Dean (1); G Wheeler (2); C Flannery (2); T Puletua (1); A Dixon (1); M Fa'asavalu (2); Goals: J Foster (8)		Tries: V Duport (1); C Varela (1); Mendes (1); M Mitchell (1); Goals: N Wynn (2)	Stadium: GPW Recruitment Stadium; Attendance: 4,043

Toulouse knocked out of Challenge Cup

Toulouse made a spirited and enthusiastic challenge but where eventually overcome by the favourites from the Engage Super League. The Icelandic volcanic cloud meant the Toulouse had to endure a 24-hour coach and ferry journey to St Helens. Toulouse playing some slick football in the first half to initially shock the Saints and showed no sign of travel fatigue when they took the lead in their first set, with the bounce of the ball bamboozling Leon Pryce to allow centre Vincent Duport to collect and score. The teams were very close for much of the first half before Flannery raced through for the try that effectively killed off the French resistance two minutes before the break After the break St Helens piled on the tries before the unstoppable Fa'asavalu charged over for his second, to bring up the half-century as the Frenchmen tired. Toulouse grabbed a late consolation try when Martin Mitchell barged over.

Saints assistant coach Kieron Purtill paid tribute to the travel-weary French side; "They played some nice football, they have some internationals in there. They will ruffle a few feathers in the Championship and put a package together to apply for Super League so we knew what they were capable of."

=== Co-operative Championship Round 9: vs. Batley ===
Round 9: 1 May 2010; Co-operative Championship 2010	Toulouse Olympique	(14) 20–12 (4)	Batley Bulldogs	Toulouse, France
20:00 GMT	Tries: C Varela Mendes (2); M Griffi (1); Goals: N Wynn (4)		Tries: M Toohey (1); K Lythe (1); Goals: P Handforth (2)	Stadium: Stade des Minimes; Attendance: 2,500

Back into winning ways

Carlos Mendes Varela crossed for two first-half tries to rouse Toulouse to a 20–12 victory over Batley on Saturday night.

Mendes Varela touched down twice just before the interval, with Nathan Wynn converting on both occasions to ensure Toulouse held a 14–4 half-time lead.

After the break the Bulldogs closed the gap to just two points, Mark Toohey and Kris Lythe scored a try each but neither was converted.

Toulouse held on though and Mathieu Griffi's converted try nine minutes from the end preserved the victory.

=== Co-operative Championship Round 8: vs. Featherstone ===
Round 8: 6 May 2010; Co-operative Championship 2010	Featherstone Rovers	(18) 24–26 (10)	Toulouse Olympique	Featherstone, West Yorkshire
19:30 GMT	Tries: I Hardman (2); Z Hardaker (2); Goals: K Briggs (4)		Tries: R Bromley (1); S Planas (1); V Duport (1); M Mitchell (1); J Tisseyre (1); Goals: N Wynn (3)	Stadium: Post Office Road; Attendance: 2,233

Toulouse smash Rovers' unbeaten run

Toulouse rallied from a 14-point deficit in the second half to win 26–24 and condemn Featherstone to their first loss in the 2010 Co-operative Championship season.

Featherstone had looked on course for a ninth consecutive victory when Zak Hardaker's second try of the night was converted by Kyle Briggs resulting in a 24–10 lead after 46 minutes.

The French side fought back with tries from Martin Mitchell and Rory Bromley. Vincent Duport levelled the scores with barely three minutes remaining and Nathan Wynn held his nerve to kick the winning points and seal an unforgettable win.

=== Co-operative Championship Round 10: vs. Sheffield ===
Round 10: 15 May 2010; Co-operative Championship 2010	Sheffield Eagles	(16) 38–24 (12)	Toulouse Olympique	Sheffield, South Yorkshire
15:00 GMT	Tries: R Barnett (1); T Ropati (1); A Groom (1); C Cook (3); A Rowe (1); Goals: B Lindsay (1); M Stringer (4)		Tries: R Bromley (1); S Houles(1); V Duport (1); M Griffi(1); Goals: N Wynn (4)	Stadium: Don Valley Stadium; Attendance: 979

Cook claims hat-trick for Eagles

Craig Cook scored a second-half hat-trick as Sheffield Eagles overcome Toulouse 38–24 in the Co-operative Championship.

Sheffield led 16–12 at half-time after tries from Tangi Ropati, Aaron Groom and Richie Barnett, with Sylvain Houles and Vincent Duport replying for Toulouse.

Alex Rowe scored for Sheffield before Craig Cook his scored his second half hat trick, Toulouse scored through Rory Bromley and Mathieu Griffi.

== 2010 Transfers ==
Transfers for 2010 (In)

Nat	Name	Transferred from
(France)	Vincent Duport	Catalans Dragons
(France)	Romain Mencarini	UTC
(France)	Julien Lasserre	Bourgoin xv
(France)	Yoan Tisseyre	Lézignan Sangliers
(England)	Simon Worrall	Leeds Rhinos

Transfers for 2010 (Out)

Nat	Name	Transferred to
(France)	Matthieu Almarcha	Limoux
(France)	Jean-Christophe Borlin	St Gaudens
(France)	Joris Canton	Released
(France)	Damien Couturier	RU
(France)	Nicolas Delgal	Released
(France)	Olivier Pramil	RC Lescure-Arthes XIII, Elite 2

== 2010 squad ==
	Player	Age	Height (m)	Weight (kg)	Position	Former club	Arrived	Appearances	Points	International
1	(Australia) Rory Bromley	41	1.81	87	Fullback	Redcliffe Dolphins	2009	18	48	-
2	(France) Julien Lasserre	40	1.82	87	Winger	bourgoin xv	2009	16	12	-
3	(France) Sébastien Planas	42	1.82	90	Centre	Toulouse Olympique	2007	36	48	Yes
4	(France) Vincent Duport	38	1.84	95	Centre	Catalans Dragons	(substituted on) 2010	0	0	Yes
5	(France) Carlos Mendes Varela	41	1.88	100	Winger	Lyon Villeurbanne	(substituted on) 2009 (July)	4	8	-
6	(France) Constant Villegas	39	1.87	89	Stand off	Toulouse Olympique	2007	24	36	Yes
7	(Australia) Nathan Wynn	39	1.86	92	Scrum half	Sydney Bulls	2009	17	172	-
8	(Australia) Brendan Worth	42	1.86	103	Prop	Penrith Panthers	2009	19	0	-
9	(New Zealand) Martin Mitchell	40	1.74	88	Hooker	Parramatta Eels reserve	2009	18	24	-
10	(France) Mathieu Griffi	43	1.87	101	Prop	Catalans Dragons	2009	18	20	Yes
11	(Australia) Timothy Wynn	41	1.86	100	Second row	Wentworthville Magpies	2009	18	12	-
12	(England) Simon Worrall	41	1.83	90	Second row	Leeds Rhinos	(substituted on) 2010	0	0	-
13	(France) Eric Anselme	48	1.87	95	Loose forward	Leeds Rhinos	2009	17	16	Yes
14	(France) Antoni Maria	39	1.89	99	Second row	St Gaudens	2009	19	16	-
15	(France) Jérôme Gout	40	1.76	101	Prop	Toulouse Olympique	2007	18	4	-
16	(France) Sylvain Houles	45	1.87	96	Loose forward	Wakefield Trinity Wildcats	2007	33	8	Yes
17	(France) Cédric Gay	44	1.75	79	Hooker	St Gaudens	2007	18	32	-
18	(France) Yoan Tisseyre	37	1.76	86	Second row	Toulouse Olympique	(substituted on) 2009 (July)	3	8	-
19	(France) Romain Mencarini	37	1.82	97	Prop	Catalans Dragons reserve	(substituted on) 2010	0	0	-
20	(France) Bruno Ormeno	43	1.82	84	Centre	Toulouse Olympique	2007	19	24	-
21	(France) Nicolas Fauré	42	1.91	104	Prop	Toulouse Olympique	2007	30	8	-
22	(France) Clément Bienes	36	1.82	87	Winger	Toulouse Olympique academy	2009	3	4	-
-	(France) Yohann Gigord	37	1.76	86	Hooker	Toulouse Olympique academy	(substituted on) 2010	0	0	-
-	(France) Mourad Kriouache	35	1.72	75	Half	Toulouse Olympique academy	(substituted on) 2010	0	0	-
-	(France) Kevin Larroyer	36	1.81	91	Second row	Toulouse Olympique academy	(substituted on) 2010	0	0	-
-	(France) Cyrile Moliner	36	1.88	92	Second row	St Gaudens	(substituted on) 2010	0	0	-
-	(France) Andrei Olari	37	1.78	76	Half	Toulouse Olympique academy	(substituted on) 2010	0	0	-
-	(France) Antoine Reveillon	36	1.87	94	Second row	Toulouse Olympique academy	(substituted on) 2010	0	0	-
-	(France) Jocelyn Vauvelle	35	1.72	75	Winger	Toulouse Olympique academy	(substituted on) 2010	0	0	-
-	(France) Remi Vignaud	34	1.87	90	Centre	St Gaudens	(substituted on) 2010	0	0	-
-	(France) Geoffrey Zava	35	1.86	91	Second row	Toulouse Olympique academy	(substituted on) 2010	0	0	-
-	(France) Teli Pelo	42	1.82	102	Winger	Ramonvillea	2009	3	0	-

- Sources : www.championshipstats.rlfans.com, to13.com, as of January 2010.
