= 2009 Toulouse Olympique season =

- Co-operative Championship rank: 10th
- 2009 record: Wins: 9; losses: 11
- Points scored: For: 556 (8th); against: 582 (8th)

Team information
- Chairman: Carlos Zalduendo
- Coach: Gilles Dumas
- Captain: Éric Anselme
- Stadium: Stade des Minimes
- Avg. attendance: 2,372

Top scorers
- Tries: Rory Bromley (12); Damien Couturier (12)
- Goals: Nathan Wynn (76)
- Points: Nathan Wynn (172)
| ← 2008 | 2010 → |

2009 was the first year of participation to the Championship for the Toulouse Olympique rugby league club. Toulouse was allowed special dispensation to field five overseas players in their first season. The new Toulouse team was composed of 9 full-time players, 13 part-time players and 10 members of the Toulouse academy. With a largely renewed team and a lack of preseason (only friendly with the Dragons cancelled due to the weather), the TO started its season with a series of defeat. Its first match in the Championship proved to be too much of a challenge with a hammering 70-0 at Widnes in front of Sky cameras. However, after the victory away against Batley, the TO accumulated victories and looked on track for a top 4 spot.

The match against Featherstone at home in June however marked another turning point in the season. With the injury of the play maker Nathan Wynn and several referee decisions going against the team, the TO lost the match. Without Wynn, at the crucial time where the team was to be opposed to the favourite of the Championship, the TO lost 4 games in a row. With Wynn coming back a win away at Featherstone was a short lived success. An unexpected defeat at home against Gateshead in battle for relegation removed almost any chance left of making the playoffs. Without much stakes left in the Championship (given the absence of relegation for the TO in its first 3 seasons in Championship), Toulouse lost also two of its last 3 matches at Leigh and Halifax.

The final ranking of Toulouse, 10 out of 11, does not represent fairly the quality of a team who won 9 out of 20 matches in a very competitive division where the final champion, Barrow, won only 13 of its matches.

== Fixtures and results ==
| Competition | Round | Opponent | Result | Score | Home/Away | Venue | Attendance | Date | | Photos |
|---|---|---|---|---|---|---|---|---|---|---|
| Challenge Cup | 3 | Sheffield Eagles | Loss | 22-6 | Away | Don Valley Stadium | 1,554 | 08/03/2009 | | 1 |
| Co-operative Championship | 1 | Widnes Vikings | Loss | 70-0 | Away | Halton Stadium | 5,074 | 12/03/2009 | | 1 |
| Co-operative Championship | 2 | Sheffield Eagles | Loss | 12-18 | Home | Stade des Minimes | 1,923 | 21/03/2009 | Full match | 1, 2 |
| Co-operative Championship | 3 | Whitehaven | Loss | 40-26 | Away | Recreation Ground | 1,225 | 28/03/2009 | Match extract | 1 |
| Co-operative Championship | 5 | Batley Bulldogs | Win | 22-60 | Away | Mount Pleasant | 662 | 13/04/2009 | | 1 |
| Co-operative Championship | 6 | Leigh Centurions | Win | 46-10 | Home | Stade Ernest-Argeles | 2,000 | 18/04/2009 | Full match | 1 |
| Co-operative Championship | 7 | Doncaster | Win | 18-48 | Away | Keepmoat Stadium | 1,089 | 26/04/2009 | | 1 |
| Co-operative Championship | 8 | Whitehaven | Win | 38-18 | Home | Stade des Minimes | 2,300 | 02/05/2009 | Match extract | 1 |
| Co-operative Championship | 10 | Barrow Raiders | Win | 22-14 | Home | Stade des Minimes | 2,900 | 16/05/2009 | Full match | 1 |
| Co-operative Championship | 11 | Sheffield Eagles | Loss | 58-12 | Away | Don Valley Stadium | 809 | 23/05/2009 | | 1, 2 |
| Co-operative Championship | 12 | Gateshead Thunder | Win | 16-52 | Away | Gateshead International Stadium | 516 | 07/06/2009 | | 1, 2, 3 |
| Co-operative Championship | 13 | Batley Bulldogs | Win | 32-24 | Home | Stade des Minimes | 2,176 | 13/06/2009 | Full match | 1 |
| Co-operative Championship | 14 | Featherstone Rovers | Loss | 16-32 | Home | Stade Ernest-Argeles | 2,000 | 27/06/2009 | Full match | 1 |
| Co-operative Championship | 15 | Barrow Raiders | Loss | 30-22 | Away | Craven Park | 2,456 | 02/07/2009 | | |
| Co-operative Championship | 16 | Halifax | Loss | 16-54 | Home | Stade des Minimes | 2,697 | 18/07/2009 | Full match | 1, 2, 3 |
| Co-operative Championship | 17 | Widnes Vikings | Loss | 24-32 | Home | Stade Ernest-Argeles | 3,206 | 25/07/2009 | Full match | 1 |
| Co-operative Championship | 18 | Featherstone Rovers | Win | 18-34 | Away | Chris Moyles Stadium | 1,346 | 01/08/2009 | Match extract | |
| Co-operative Championship | 19 | Gateshead Thunder | Loss | 20-48 | Home | Stade des Minimes | 1,386 | 08/08/2009 | Match highlights | 1 |
| Co-operative Championship | 20 | Leigh Centurions | Loss | 26-6 | Away | Leigh Sports Village | 1,502 | 15/08/2009 | | 1 |
| Co-operative Championship | 21 | Doncaster | Win | 52-6 | Home | Stade des Minimes | 1,200 | 22/08/2009 | | |
| Co-operative Championship | 22 | Halifax | Loss | 34-18 | Away | Shay Stadium | 2,128 | 05/09/2009 | | 1 |

== League table ==
2009 Co-operative Championship
| Pos | Team | Pld | W | D | L | PF | PA | PD | BP | Pts | Qualification |
|---|---|---|---|---|---|---|---|---|---|---|---|
| 1 | Barrow Raiders | 20 | 13 | 0 | 7 | 632 | 361 | +271 | 5 | 44 | Qualified for the play-offs |
| 2 | Halifax | 20 | 13 | 0 | 7 | 714 | 476 | +238 | 4 | 43 | Qualified for the play-offs |
| 3 | Sheffield Eagles | 20 | 11 | 0 | 9 | 635 | 447 | +188 | 9 | 42 | Qualified for the play-offs |
| 4 | Widnes Vikings | 20 | 11 | 0 | 9 | 649 | 438 | +211 | 6 | 39 | Qualified for the play-offs |
| 5 | Whitehaven | 20 | 12 | 0 | 8 | 565 | 567 | −2 | 3 | 39 | Qualified for the play-offs |
| 6 | Featherstone Rovers | 20 | 12 | 0 | 8 | 619 | 524 | +95 | 1 | 37 | Qualified for the play-offs |
| 7 | Gateshead Thunder | 20 | 9 | 2 | 9 | 610 | 657 | −47 | 3 | 32 | |
| 8 | Batley Bulldogs | 20 | 8 | 2 | 10 | 536 | 620 | −84 | 6 | 32 | |
| 9 | Leigh Centurions | 20 | 9 | 0 | 11 | 426 | 572 | −146 | 5 | 32 | Relegated |
| 10 | Toulouse Olympique XIII | 20 | 9 | 0 | 11 | 556 | 582 | −26 | 3 | 30 (Note: Toulouse were exempt from relegation.) | |
| 11 | Doncaster | 20 | 1 | 0 | 19 | 257 | 955 | −698 | −4 | −1 (Note: Doncaster had 5 bonus points, but lost 9 competition points for entering administration.) | Relegated |

Source: www.cooperativechampionship.co.uk and Rugby-League.com
Rules for classification: 1st on league points; 2nd on match points difference.

== 2009 Squad and players' statistics ==
| | Player | Appearances | Tries | Goals | Drop | Points | Position | Former club | International | Status | Note |
|---|---|---|---|---|---|---|---|---|---|---|---|
| 1 | (Australia) Rory Bromley | 18 | 12 | 0 | 0 | 48 | Fullback | Redcliffe Dolphins | - | Full-time |
| 2 | (France) Sébastien Payan | 16 | 3 | 0 | 0 | 12 | Winger | Catalans Dragons | - | Part-time |
| 3 | (France) Sébastien Planas | 18 | 8 | 0 | 0 | 32 | Centre | Toulouse Olympique | Yes | Full-time |
| 4 | (France) Damien Couturier | 20 | 12 | 12 | 0 | 72 | Centre | Toulouse Olympique | - | Full-time |
| 5 | (France) Julien Lasserre | 19 | 9 | 2 | 0 | 46 | Fullback | Toulouse Olympique | - | Part-time |
| 6 | (France) Constant Villegas | 19 | 8 | 0 | 0 | 32 | Stand off | Toulouse Olympique | Yes | Part-time |
| 7 | (Australia) Nathan Wynn | 17 | 5 | 76 | 0 | 172 | Scrum half | Sydney Bulls | - | Full-time |
| 8 | (Australia) Brendan Worth | 19 | 0 | 0 | 0 | 0 | Prop | Penrith Panthers | - | Full-time |
| 9 | (New Zealand) Martin Mitchell | 18 | 6 | 0 | 0 | 24 | Hooker | Parramatta Eels reserve | - | Full-time |
| 10 | (France) Mathieu Griffi | 18 | 5 | 0 | 0 | 20 | Prop | Catalans Dragons | Yes | Full-time |
| 11 | (Australia) Timothy Wynn | 18 | 3 | 0 | 0 | 12 | Second row | Wentworthville Magpies | - | Full-time |
| 12 | (France) Mathieu Almarcha | 16 | 3 | 0 | 0 | 0 | Second row | Toulouse Olympique | - | Part-time |
| 13 | (France) Eric Anselme | 17 | 4 | 0 | 0 | 16 | Loose forward | Leeds Rhinos | Yes | Full-time |
| 14 | (France) Antoni Maria | 19 | 4 | 0 | 0 | 16 | Second row | St Gaudens | - | Toulouse academy |
| 15 | (France) Jérôme Gout | 0 | 0 | 0 | 0 | 0 | Prop | Toulouse Olympique | - | Part-time | Injured all season |
| 16 | (France) Olivier Pramil | 10 | 1 | 0 | 0 | 4 | Prop | New York Knights | - | Part-time |
| 17 | (France) Yohan Barthau | 6 | 0 | 0 | 0 | 0 | Second row | St Gaudens | - | Toulouse academy |
| 18 | (France) Adrien Viala | 7 | 2 | 0 | 0 | 8 | Winger | Toulouse Olympique | - | Part-time |
| 19 | (France) Nicolas Delgal | 2 | 0 | 0 | 0 | 0 | Scrum half | RC Albi XIII | - | Toulouse academy |
| 20 | (France) Sylvain Houles | 16 | 1 | 0 | 0 | 0 | Loose forward | Toulouse Olympique | - | Part-time |
| 21 | (France) Bruno Ormeno | 10 | 4 | 0 | 0 | 16 | Centre | Toulouse Olympique | - | Part-time |
| 22 | (France) Nicolas Fauré | 13 | 2 | 0 | 0 | 8 | Prop | Toulouse Olympique | - | Part-time |
| 23 | (France) Cédric Gay | 9 | 4 | 0 | 0 | 0 | Hooker | Toulouse Olympique | - | Part-time |
| - | (France) Clément Bienes | 3 | 1 | 0 | 0 | 0 | Winger | Toulouse Olympique | - | Toulouse academy |
| - | (France) Kevin Liguoro | 1 | 2 | 0 | 0 | 0 | Winger | Toulouse Olympique | - | Toulouse academy |
| - | (France) Teli Pelo | 3 | 0 | 0 | 0 | 0 | Winger | Ramonvillea | - |
| - | (France) Jean-Christophe Borlin | 12 | 1 | 0 | 0 | 4 | Prop | St Gaudens | Yes | | Arrived in May |
| - | (France) Yoan Tisseyre | 3 | 2 | 0 | 0 | 0 | Second row | Lezignan | - | | Arrived in the summer |
| - | (France) Carlos Mendes Varela | 4 | 2 | 0 | 0 | 0 | Winger | Lyon | - | | Arrived in the summer |
| - | (France) Florian Quintilla | 3 | 0 | 0 | 0 | 0 | Second row | Catalans Dragons | - | | On loan one month |

- Source : www.championshipstats.rlfans.com, FFR13. Are only included players who played at least one game in the season.
