= Marquis of Falces =

Marquis of Falces (marqués de Falces) is a Navarrese title of nobility created in 1513 for the counts of Santisteban de Lerín.

- Alonso Carrillo de Peralta 1st Marquis of Falces, son (grandson?) of Pedro de Peralta y Ezpeleta,
- Antonio Carrillo de Peralta y de Velasco, 2nd Marquis of Falces (d. 1545)
- Gastón de Peralta, 3rd Marquis of Falces (d. 1587)
- Antonio Peralta y Velasco, 4th Marquis of Falces (d. 1596)
- Ana María Carrillo de Peralta y Velasco, V marquesa de Falces, condesa de Santisteban de Lerín (d. 1640)
- Diego Felix de Peralta y Croÿ, VI marqués de Falces (1618–1682)
- José Martín de Peralta y Velasco, VII marqués de Falces, conde de Santisteban de Lerín * 1670
- Rosa María de Santa Isabel de Peralta y Velasco, VIII marquesa de Falces, condesa de Santisteban de Lerín * c. 1673
- María Teresa de Castejón Peralta y Velasco, IX marquesa de Falces, condesa de Santisteban de Lerín y de Agramonte * 1694
- Manuel de Montalvo y Hurtado de Amezaga, marqués de Torreblanca y X de Falces, Conde de Santisteban de Lerín * 1734
- José Nicolás de Montalvo y Álvarez de las Asturias-Bohorques, marqués de Torreblanca, XI marqués de Falces * 1760
- María de la Cabeza de Tavira y Montalvo, XII marquesa de Falces (1809–1838)
- José Carlos Velluti y Tavira, XIII marqués de Falces, IV marqués del Cerro de la Cabeza (1831–1896)
- José María Velluti Zbikowsky, XIV marqués de Falces, V marqués del Cerro de la Cabeza (b. 1886, d. after 1959)
- Pedro Fernando Félix María Velluti y Murga, 15th Marqués de Falces (1912–1987)
- Olga Velluti y Murga, 16th Marquesa de Falces, and José Ramón Suárez del Otero y Velluti, 17th Marqués de Falces: see Tizona#History
