= Antonio Carrillo de Peralta y de Velasco, 2nd Marquis of Falces =

Antonio Carrillo de Peralta y de Velasco, II Marquis of Falces, deceased in 1545, Marcilla, Navarra, Spain, was the son of Navarrese Conetable of the kingdom of Navarre Alonso Carrillo - Acuña y de Peralta, 1st Marquis of Falces, 2nd Count Consort of Santisteban de Lerín, Sieur Consort of Peralta, Falces, Carcer, and other Navarrese places, deceased and buried at Marcilla, Navarre, in 1534.

His grandfather, the Count of Agosta, Sicily, Troylos Carrillo de Acuña, had married, through the influences of his father, 22 November 1467, Navarrese lady Juana de Peralta y de Brabante. Grandmother Juana de Peralta y de Brabante, was the daughter of the 1st Count of Santisteban de Lerin, Navarre, influential Mossen Pierres de Peralta II who had married, 27 November 1440, in the Navarrese Royal Palace of Olite Flemish Princess, Anne de Brabante. Ambitious Troylos Carrillo was however a "son of the sin", mother unknown, of powerful and politically troublesome Archbishop of Toledo, between 1446 and 1482, Alfonso Carrillo de Acuña, of Portuguese and Castilian ancestors, the great grandfather of this II Marquis of Falces.

The II Marquis of Falces mother was famous Ana de Velasco y de Padilla, who after receiving in 1516, while alone in her castle of Marcilla, the visit of Hernando del Villar, in charge by Regent of Spain, the Catholic Church Cardinal Francisco Jiménez de Cisneros, O.F.M. (in his lifetime, known as Ximénes de Cisneros), (1436 – November 8, 1517) of demolishing the Navarrese castles resisting the Artillery of the time, 1512, when Upper Navarre was "incorporated" to what is now Spain by King of Aragon, Sicily, Catalunya and Navarre, Ferdinand II of Aragon, was ransomed by her hidden soldiers after a copious dinner and told to leave, immediately, in a haughty and clear manner, her town and her castle. She was a niece of Pedro Fernández de Velasco y Manrique de Lara, 6th Conetable de Castile, circa 1472, 2nd Count of Haro, (born circa 1425 - Conquest of Granada, 1492).

Antonio Carrillo de Oeralta y de Velasco, (+1545), married Ana del Bosquete, from Lower Navarre, now in France, being father and mother, between others, named Ana, Pedro, Juan, Gabriel, Antonio and Leonor, of Viceroy of Mexico, 1566 - 1568, Gastón de Peralta, marqués de Falces, (1510 - 1595).
