= Gout (disambiguation) =

Gout is a medical ailment. It can also refer to:

== Surname ==
- Alberto Gout (1913–1966), Mexican screenwriter, producer and film director
- Christianne Gout, Mexican dancer and actress
- Gout Gout (born 2007), Australian track and field athlete
- Henri Gout (1876–1953), French politician
- Jean-Louis Gout, French mathematician, president of University of Pau and the Adour Region, France
- Jérôme Gout (born 1986), French former rugby league footballer
- Leopoldo Gout

== Other ==
- Jatropha podagrica, a plant commonly known as the Gout Plant or Gout Stalk
- "Gout", a track of the debut 1994 album Put Your Hands Down of Penal Colony

== See also ==
- Gout-Rossignol, commune in France
- Gouts, a commune in France
- List of people known as the Gouty
