= Toledo steel =

High quality steel alloy

Toledo steel, historically known for being exceptionally hard, is from Toledo, Spain, which has been a traditional sword-making, metal-working center since about the Roman period, and came to the attention of Rome when used by Hannibal in the Punic Wars. It soon became a standard source of weaponry for Roman legions.

Toledo steel was famed for its high quality alloy.

== History ==
The name "Toledo steel" comes from the city where these special steel products were most-notably crafted: Toledo, Spain. Toledo steel forging techniques were developed from ancient customs associated with culture in the Iberian Peninsula, and used to forge many different types of weapons over the course of many centuries. In simple terms, the Toledo steel technique consisted of a steel blade that enveloped a wrought iron strip, thus preventing the steel from bending or cracking. As such, the strong and durable Toledo steel weapons were said to have had a "soul of iron".

In ancient Iberia, blacksmiths in Toledo applied their unique method of forging to the production of falcatas. Numerous tribes of ancient Hispania were known to use these weapons, especially those of southern Iberia. They were designed to inflict wounds thought to be more fatal than other weapons of the time.

Falcatas produced in Toledo were highly prized by Carthaginian general Hannibal Barca. These falcatas soon saw much greater use when Hannibal chose to outfit his Carthaginian soldiers with them during the Second Punic War. Over the course of the Second Punic War, Rome also gained an appreciation for the quality of Toledo, later making Toledo a standard source of weaponry for Roman legions.

The two swords carried by El Cid, Tizona and Colada, were forged in Toledo. Around that time, the Moors of Iberia adapted the forging of their scimitars to include the advanced techniques found in Toledo.

The peak of Toledo steel production was seen in the 15th and 16th centuries, and by the end of the Reconquista, Toledo was considered to be the greatest sword-making centre in the world. And while Toledo steel set the standard for excellence of European weapons, there were also very few locales that surpassed Toledo in terms of production volume (for example Solingen or Passau in Germany).

As armies began to replace swords with firearms, the blacksmithing tradition at large began its decline. In an attempt to preserve the techniques, methods, and quality of Toledo steel production, Carlos III ordered creation of the Royal Sword Factory in Toledo (Real Fábrica de Espadas de Toledo) in 1761.

As of 2021 there are only two artisan steel-producing workshops remaining in Toledo.

== Production ==
The production process of Toledo steel had been kept a secret until the 20th century. Toledo steel is two different types of steel, one high and one low in carbon content, that are forged together. Since the steels that were being forged together had different carbon content, one is considered soft steel and the other is hard steel. Because both hard and soft steel are forged together, Toledo steel has material properties of both hard and soft steel. The actual process of making Toledo steel was very difficult and long. Because of this, Toledo steel weapons were rare. The process had to be followed very strictly, regarding time, temperatures, etc., or, otherwise, the product would not be of the highest quality. Then the steel was cooled in either water or oil for a certain amount of time. In the early production days of Toledo steel the timing was done using prayers and psalms. As blacksmiths crafted these weapons, they would recite the same prayers, in the same rhythm, to make sure the timing was the same every time. Because of the intricacies of the production and the rarity of the product, the average blacksmith could only create about 2–3 Toledo steel weapons per year. Hydraulic systems were introduced at the end of the 19th century to greatly increase the production of Toledo steel products, and production went up by 200% towards the end of the 19th century.

== Material properties ==
Toledo steel consists of two steels of different carbon contents welded together by hot forging. Because the steels had different carbon contents, one of the steels was soft and flexible but not suitable for an edge, the other was hard to provide a superior edge but with the undesirable characteristic of being brittle. Welding the soft and hard steels together gave the composite material beneficial characteristics of both the soft and hard metals. Compared to other mainstream steels at the time it was hard enough and flexible enough to be efficient in war. The reason for the success of Toledo steel is due to the fact that the steel uses a combination of mechanical properties of materials of extremely different chemical compositions.

== See also ==
- Damascus steel
- Wootz steel
- Noric steel
- Bulat steel
- Tamahagane steel
