= Fresh Verdicts on Joan of Arc =

1996 anthology on Joan of Arc

- Editor: Bonnie Wheeler, Charles Wood
- Subject: Joan of Arc
- Publication date: 1996
- ISBN: 0-8153-3664-0

Fresh Verdicts on Joan of Arc (edited by Bonnie Wheeler and Charles Wood) is an anthology of scholarly essays on Joan of Arc. First published by Garland publishing in 1996 (ISBN 0-8153-3664-0), it is 336 pages long.

Bonnie Wheeler is the Director of the Medieval Studies Program at Southern Methodist University. Charles Wood is emeritus professor of history at Dartmouth College.

The essays in the book are arranged in roughly chronological order, beginning with studies and investigations in Joan's own time and proceeding to those of later years.

== Contents ==
- Preface (by Charles T. Wood)
- Joan of Arc's Sword in the Stone (by Bonnie Wheeler). A brief discussion of Joan's sword, obtained from the church of Sainte-Catherine-de-Fierbois and its relation to other famous swords with mystic powers such as those of King Arthur (Excaliber), Roland (Durendal), El Cid (Tizona and Colada), Charlemagne (Joyeuse), and others. Wheeler discusses how such swords serve the functions of identifying, authenticating, or legitimizing the possessor, and she discusses specifically what Joan's sword meant to her (Joan) and her contemporaries, including the judges at the condemnation trial.
- A Woman as Leader of Men: Joan of Arc's Military Career (by Kelly DeVries). Kelly DeVries, author of Joan of Arc: A Military Leader, addresses as his main concern the question as to why the French soldiers followed Joan? After a brief outline of Joan's military career, he argues that Joan, in contrast to other non-noble military leaders who secured a following by offering the rewards of plunder, Joan relied on her spiritual and religious example to motivate her soldiers.
- Joan of Arc's Mission and the Lost Record of Her Interrogation at Poitiers (by Charles T. Wood) The lost record of the examination at Poitiers is the biggest gap in the biographical record of Joan of Arc. Charles Wood examines this matter in an attempt to discover why the records of that examination went missing, or whether in fact they were deliberately destroyed. He speculates as to why this might have been done, and how their suppression might have been undertaken out of political considerations at the time of (or before) the rehabilitation trial in the 1450s.
- True Lies: Transvestism and Idolatry in the Trial of Joan of Arc (by Susan Schibanoff)
- Was Joan of Arc a "Sign" of Charles VII's Innocence (by Jean Fraikin)
- Transcription Errors in the Texts of Joan of Arc's History (by Olivier Bouzy)
- "I Do Not Name to You the Voice of St. Michael": The Identification of Joan of Arc's Voices (by Karen Sullivan)
- Readers of the Lost Arc: Secrecy, Secularity, and Speculation in the Trial of Joan of Arc (by Steven Weiskopf)
- Joan of Arc and Christine de Pizan: The Symbiosis of Two Warriors in the Ditie de Jehanne d'Arc (by Christine McWebb)
- Christine de Pizan's Pro-Joan Propaganda (by Anne D. Lutkus and Julia M. Walker)
- Speaking of Angels: A Fifteenth-Century Bishop in Defence of Joan of Arc's Mystical Voices (by Jane Marie Pinzino)
- Martin Le Franc's Commentary on Jean Gerson's Treatise on Joan of Arc (by Gertrude H. Merkle)
- Why Joan of Arc Never Became an Amazon (by Deborah Fraioli)
- Joan of Arc's Last Trial: The Attack of the Devil's Advocates (by Henry Ansgar Kelly)
- Jeanne Au Cinema (by Kevin J. Harty)
- The "Joan Phenomenon" and the French Right (by Nadia Margolis)
- Epilogue: Joan of Arc or the Survival of a People (by Régine Pernoud)
- Appendix: Joan of Arc and Her Doctors (by Marie-Véronique Clin)
- Appendix: Aspects of Material Culture in the Paris Region at the Time of Joan of Arc (by Nicole Meyer Rodrigues)
