= Pedro de Peralta y Ezpeleta =

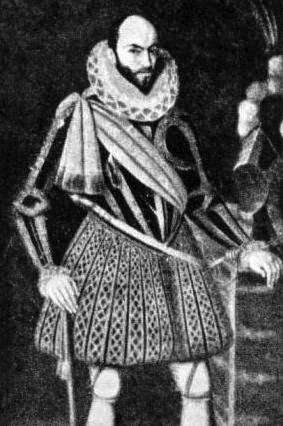
Pedro de Peralta y Ezpeleta

Pedro de Peralta y Ezpeleta (1421–1492), also known as Pierres de Peralta the Younger, was a Navarrese nobleman, politician and military leader, active in the Navarrese Civil War (1451–1455). He was the first Count of Santisteban de Lerín, Baron of Marcilla, and lord of Peralta, Funes, Cárcar, Andosilla, Marcilla, Falces, Undiano, Azagra and Caparroso.

He was the son of Pedro Martínez de Peralta and Ruiz de Azagra (also known as Pierres de Peralta the Elder) and Juana de Ezpeleta y Garro, daughter of the Baron de Ezpeleta of the family of the lords of Ezpeleta and Gallipienzo, and sister of Beltrán de Ezpeleta, first Viscount of Valderro.

He married twice, in 1440 with Anne of Brabant, illegitimate daughter of Anthony of Burgundy and in 1462 Isabel de Foix y de Albret of the royal family of Navarre (house Foix-Grailly).

He maintained close relations with the House of Trastámara and the Catholic Monarchs, and he received titles in exchange for his agreement to the marriage of Isabel I of Castile to Ferdinand II of Aragon in 1469. Ferdinand in 1513 created de Peralta's grandson Alonso Carrillo de Peralta the first marquis of Falces. The marquesses of Falces would reside in Marcilla Castle, built by Pierres the Elder, for the next five centuries.
