= Carlos Mendes =

Carlos Mendes may refer to:

- Carlos Mendes (soccer), American soccer player and manager
- Carlos Mendes (singer), Portuguese singer
- Carlos Mendes Gomes, Guinea-Bissau footballer
- Carlos Mendes Varela, Portuguese-born French rugby league player
