= Tizona =

Name of one of the swords carried by El Cid

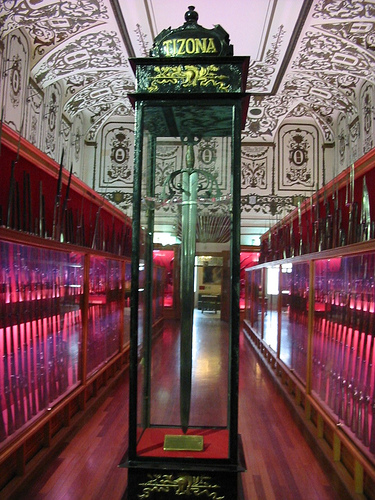
The Tizona sword while on exhibit in the Museo del Ejército (Salón de Reinos) in Madrid

Tizona (also Tizón) is the name of one of the swords carried by Rodrigo Díaz de Vivar, El Cid, according to the Cantar de Mio Cid. The name of the second sword of El Cid is Colada.

A sword identified as Tizona was given by Ferdinand II of Aragon to Pedro de Peralta, count of Santisteban de Lerín in c. 1470. This sword was long kept in Marcilla Castle, later in the Army Museum in Madrid and since 2007 in the Museo de Burgos.

== Name ==
The name used in the Cantar de Mio Cid is Tizón. The form Tizona has been in use since the late medieval period (14th century). The blade inscription on the Marcilla sword, presumably of the 13th or 14th century, has the form TIZONA.

The older form of the name, tizón, is a word for "firebrand" (leño encendido, from Latin titionem). Sebastián de Covarrubias (1611) recognizes this as the plausible origin of the name Tizona, but also adduces possible derivation from τυχωνα, the name of the lance of Severus Alexander, or from τύχη "fortuna".

James I of Aragon (r. 1213–1276) according to the Llibre dels fets had a sword named Tisó. The description of this sword makes no reference to El Cid, suggesting that tizon "firebrand" was in use as a generic term for "sword" (cf. the same use of English brand). The extended (feminine) form tizona, by reference to El Cid's sword, could later also stand in as a poetic synonym of "sword" in general.

== Literary tradition ==
According to the Cantar de Mio Cid, El Cid won the sword from its previous owner, King Yucef in Valencia. Afterward, it was given by El Cid to his sons-in-law, the Infantes de Carrión but eventually returned into the possession of El Cid.

In the poem, Tizona's power depends on the wielder, and it frightens unworthy opponents. When the infantes of Carrión had Tizona, they underestimated the power of the sword, due to their cowardice, but when Pero Vermúdez was going to fight Ferrán González and unsheathed Tizona (a gift from El Cid), Ferrán González yelled and surrendered, cowering in terror at the sight of Tizona (verses 3642-3645):

Él dexó la lança, e mano al espada metió; cuando lo vio Ferrán González, conuvo a Tizón, que antes qu'el golpe esperasse, dixo: -¡Vençido sói!-	"He [Pero Vermúdez] let go the lance and took the sword in hand; when Ferrán González saw that, he recognized Tizona and before the expected blow said, "I am defeated!"

According to legend, after his death in 1099, the body of El Cid was seated in full armour and in the monastery church of San Pedro de Cardeña, and there with the sword Tizona struck down a Jew who plucked the dead hero's beard. The monks revived the stunned Jew, who let himself be baptized and under the name Diego Gil became the servant of El Cid's squire Gil Diaz.

== Artefact ==
=== Description ===
The Tizona sword was long owned by the Marquesses of Falces and kept in their Marcilla Castle; now in the Museo de Burgos, the sword has a length of 93.5 centimetres (36.8 in) long and a mass of 1.15 kilograms (2.5 lb). The broad blade is of type XIII, typical of c. the 12th century, with a narrow fuller running along less than half of the blade's length. The hilt is later, added in the time of the Catholic Monarchs, with the elaborate curved crossguard typical of the "Hispano-Moorish" style of the period.

Its blade carries acid etched inscriptions in the fullers on either side:

YO SOY LA TIZONA ~ FUE : FECHA ~~ ENLAERA : DE : MILE : QVARENTA (Yo soy la Tizona [que] fue hecha en la era de mil e quarenta, "I am the Tizona, who was made in the year 1040")
AVE : MARIA GRATIA ~~ PLENA DOMINVSSMECVN (Ave Maria gratia plena; dominus mecum [sic], "Hail Mary, full of grace; the Lord be with me")

Debate on the sword's authenticity concerns the blade. If authentic, both the hilt and the inscription would have been added later (the inscription possibly in the 13th to 14th century, the hilt in the 15th century). The date "1040" given in the description is traditionally identified as given in the Hispanic Era (38 BC), i.e. designating the year AD 1002. The name Tizona itself suggests a late medieval date, as early references use the name Tizón, with Tizona being recorded only from the 14th century.

Menéndez Pidal considered the entire sword to be a 16th-century forgery. By contrast, Bruhn de Hoffmeyer (1988) said that the blade may be identical to the sword listed as La Colada in the 1503 inventory. A 2001 examination performed by the Complutense University of Madrid concluded that the blade may indeed date from the 11th century.

Álvaro Soler del Campo, curator at the Museo del Ejército, points out that the sword is formed of three joined pieces and that their typology is the same as that of the handle, adornment, and the inscription, from the era of the Catholic Monarchs.

=== History ===
A sword identified as Tizona is listed in the treasure stock of the house of Castille, transferred by The 1st Duque de Trujillo, recovered in 1452 and placed in a 1503 inventory of the Alcázar of Segovia. The 1503 inventory reads "a sword called Tizona, that belonged to El Cid; it has a channel in each side, with gilded lettering; it has a hilt, and cross, and a block of silver, and in relief castles and lions and a small golden lion on each part of the cross; and has a scabbard of red leather lined with green velvet." This does not fit the description of the extant sword exhibited as Tizona, but the suggestion has been made that the sword listed as Colada in the same inventory may be the same now known as Tizona (Bruhn de Hoffmeyer 1988)

According to Prudencio de Sandoval's Historia de los reyes de Castilla y León (1615), Ferdinand II of Aragon gave a sword identified as Tizona to Pedro de Peralta y Ezpeleta, first Count of Santisteban of Lerín (also cited as Antonio Carrillo de Peralta, 2nd Marqués de Falces), for services rendered in the negotiations that led to his marriage with Isabel of Castile in 1469. This sword remained in the possession of the Marqueses of Falces, from at least the 17th century kept in the Palacial Castle of Marcilla.

Marcilla Castle was plundered by the Republicans in the Spanish Civil War, but it was recovered by the Nationalist faction upon taking Figueres. The sword was properly stored in a crate, with a note "Comrade, respect this sword, it is the sword of El Cid" (Camarada, respeta esta espada, es la espada del Cid). The sword was moved to the Museo del Ejército in Madrid and was on display there during 1944–2007, while remaining the property of the Marquesses of Falces. The 14th Marqués in 1959 bequeathed ownership of the sword in equal parts to his two children, Pedro and Olga Velluti. The siblings in 1980 confirmed the sword's loan to the Museo del Ejército. Pedro Velluti y Murga, 15th Marqués de Falces (1912-1987), died in 1987. In a will made two years earlier, he made Salustiano Fernández and his wife Jacinta Méndez his sole beneficiaries, "for lacking forced heirs and having a sister [Olga] who abandoned him to his Luck, which could not have been better." Salustiano Fernández, an Asturias fisherman, and his wife had cared for the blind Marqués prior to his death. The marquessate passed to Olga Velluti, who became The 16th Marquesa de Falces. However, in 1997, she transferred the peerage to her son, José Ramón Suárez del Otero y Velluti, who thus became The 17th Marqués de Falces.

In 1999, The 17th Marqués de Falces announced his intention of selling the sword. The Ministry of Culture began a process of estimating the value of the artefact. The sword was declared Bien de Interés Cultural in January 2003. In October 2003, the Ministry offered EUR 1.5 million, and The 17th Marqués de Falces accepted the offer. However, a 2007 report cast doubt on the sword's authenticity, and the Ministry withdrew its offer, reducing the estimated value to EUR 200,000 – 300,000. The study in question was authored by Jose Godoy, who concluded that the sword was a "false relic". The Marqués de Falces voiced his disappointment to the Spanish press, stating "I would dare to say that that man has never seen the sword in his life". The sword was eventually sold in 2007/8, for a reported price of EUR 1.6 million, by the autonomous community of Castile and León and the Cabinet of Commerce and Industry of Burgos, and since then has been on display in the Museum of Burgos alongside other presumed relics of El Cid. In 2011, a lawsuit was filed by the two daughters of Salustiano Fernández, demanding to be paid half of the purchase price, assuming that the sword after 1959 had been co-owned by Pedro, 15th Marqués de Falces, and his sister, Olga Velluti. The lawsuit went on to the Tribunal Supremo (Supreme Court of Spain), which in 2016 finally ruled The 17th Marqués de Falces the sole owner of the sword. This judgement reversed two previous verdicts which declared the plaintiffs co-owners of the sword. The Tribunal Supremo decision was based on the uninterrupted ownership of the sword from 1987 by Olga Velluti, 16th Marquesa de Falces, following the death of her brother, The 15th Marqués de Falces, "for more than the six-year period established by the Civil Code [of 1955]".
