= Himno Istmeño =

National anthem of Panama

Himno Nacional de Panamá
English: National anthem of Panama
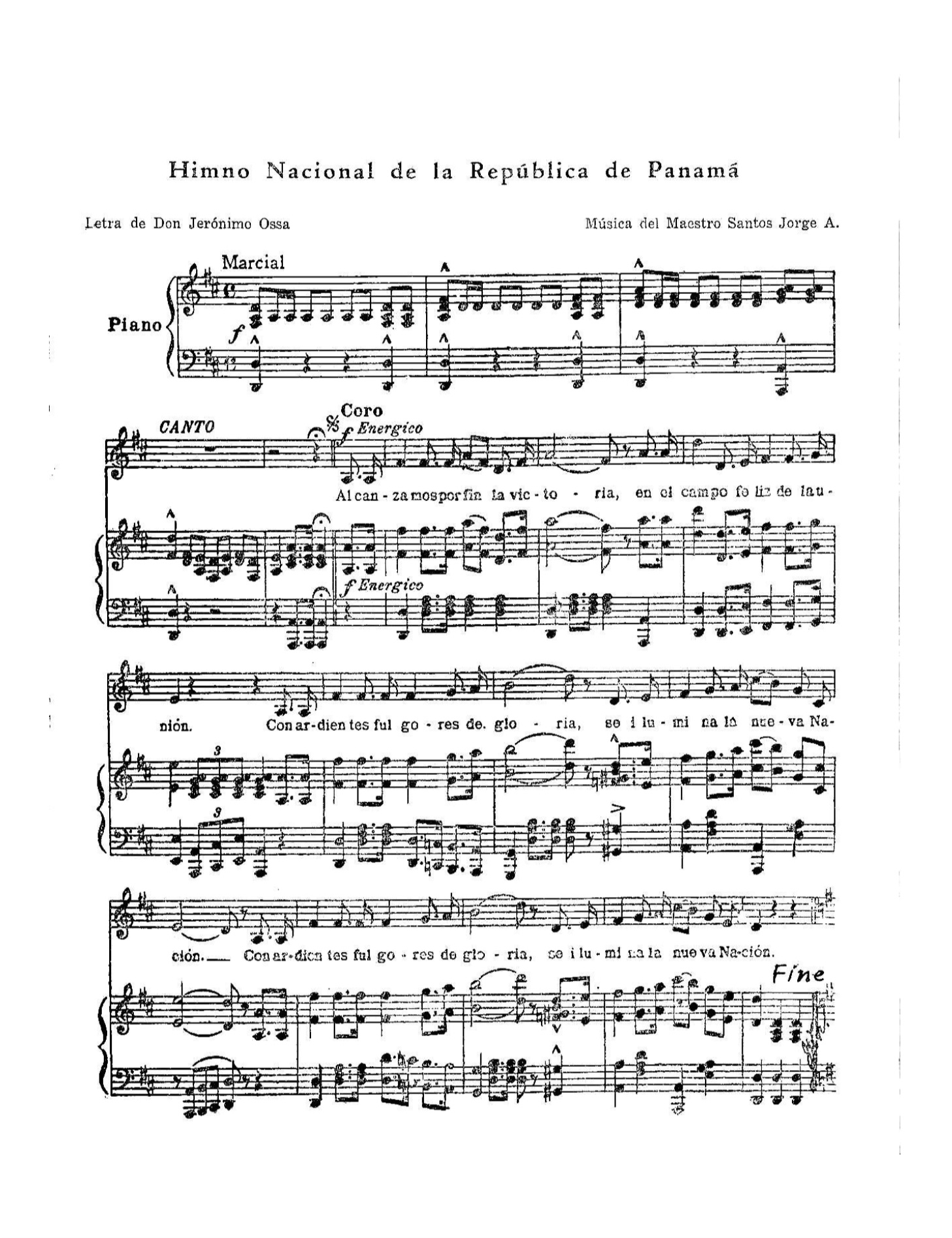
- Sheet music of the national anthem of Panama
- National anthem of Panama
- Also known as: Alcanzamos por fin la victoria (English: At last we reached victory)
- Lyrics: Jeronimo de la Ossa, 1903
- Music: Santos A. Jorge, 1903
- Adopted: 1906

Audio sample
- U.S. Navy Band instrumental version (chorus and one verse): file; help

"Himno Istmeño" (English: "Isthmian Hymn") is the national anthem of Panama (Spanish: Himno Nacional de Panamá). The music was composed by Santos A. Jorge, and the lyrics were written by Jeronimo de la Ossa. It is also known by its incipit, "Alcanzamos por fin la victoria" ("At last we reached victory").

The song is directed to the average, working-class Panamanian, with such lyrics as "Ahead the shovel and pick; At work without any more dilation".

== History ==
In 1897, Spanish-born musician Santos Jorge composed the "Himno Istmeño", which was initially a student song but reached levels of popularity among the population. Jorge had composed the official music for the anthem, but it had no lyrics, so he told his friend Jerónimo Ossa to write lyrics for it. However, this song is not the same as the one currently performed, since it underwent some changes. No records are found of how or by whom the changes were made to the original anthem.

Upon independence from Colombia in 1903, William I. Buchanan, the United States' first ambassador and minister plenipotentiary to Panama, was to present credentials to the Provisional Junta of Government, and there was no anthem to perform, as required by usual protocol. Jorge suggested that his anthem be used for such an occasion, which was accepted, since the song was supported by the general public. Jorge asked his friend Jerónimo Ossa to write lyrics, to which he agreed and wrote the lyrics for the Panamanian national anthem.

In 1906, the National Assembly adopted the anthem in accordance with Law 39 and provisionally, since it was decided to hold a contest to choose a new composition. The Panamanian people chose it again. Later, in the 1941 Constitution, an article was included that definitively adopted the National Anthem as a symbol of the nation.

In 2012, the National Anthem was recorded digitally for the first time, since there was no digital version of it. The new recording was made at the National Theatre of Panama with the National Symphony Orchestra, the Musica Viva Choir and the Polyphonic Choir of Panama, under the direction of Maestro Jorge Ledezma. It was made available to the general public to be downloaded free of charge.

== Lyrics ==
Spanish original

Coro:
Alcanzamos por fin la victoria
En el campo feliz de la unión;
𝄆 Con ardientes fulgores de gloria
¡Se ilumina la nueva nación! 𝄇

I
Es preciso cubrir con un velo
Del pasado el calvario y la cruz;
Y que adorne el azul de tu cielo
De concordia la espléndida luz.

El progreso acaricia tus lares.
Al compás de sublime canción,
Ves rugir a tus pies ambos mares
Que dan rumbo a tu noble misión.

Coro

II
En tu suelo cubierto de flores
A los besos del tibio terral,
Terminaron guerreros fragores;
Sólo reina el amor fraternal.

Adelante la pica y la pala,
Al trabajo sin más dilación,
Y seremos así prez y gala
De este mundo feraz de Colón.

Coro

English translation

Chorus:
At last we reached victory
In the joyous field of the union;
𝄆 With ardent fires of glory
A new nation shines bright. 𝄇

I
It is necessary to cover with a veil
The past time of Calvary and cross;
Let now the blue skies be adorned with
The splendid light of the concord.

Progress caresses your path.
To the rhythm of a sublime song,
You see both your seas roar at your feet
Giving you a path to your noble mission.

Chorus

II
In your soil covered with flowers
To the kisses of the warm terrestrial breeze,
Warrior roars have ceased;
Only fraternal love reigns.

Ahead the shovel and pick,
At work without any more dilation,
and we will be as such at work and gala
of this fruitful world of Columbus.

Chorus
