= Peralta, Navarre =

Peralta Azkoien (Basque)
- Peralta / Azkoien
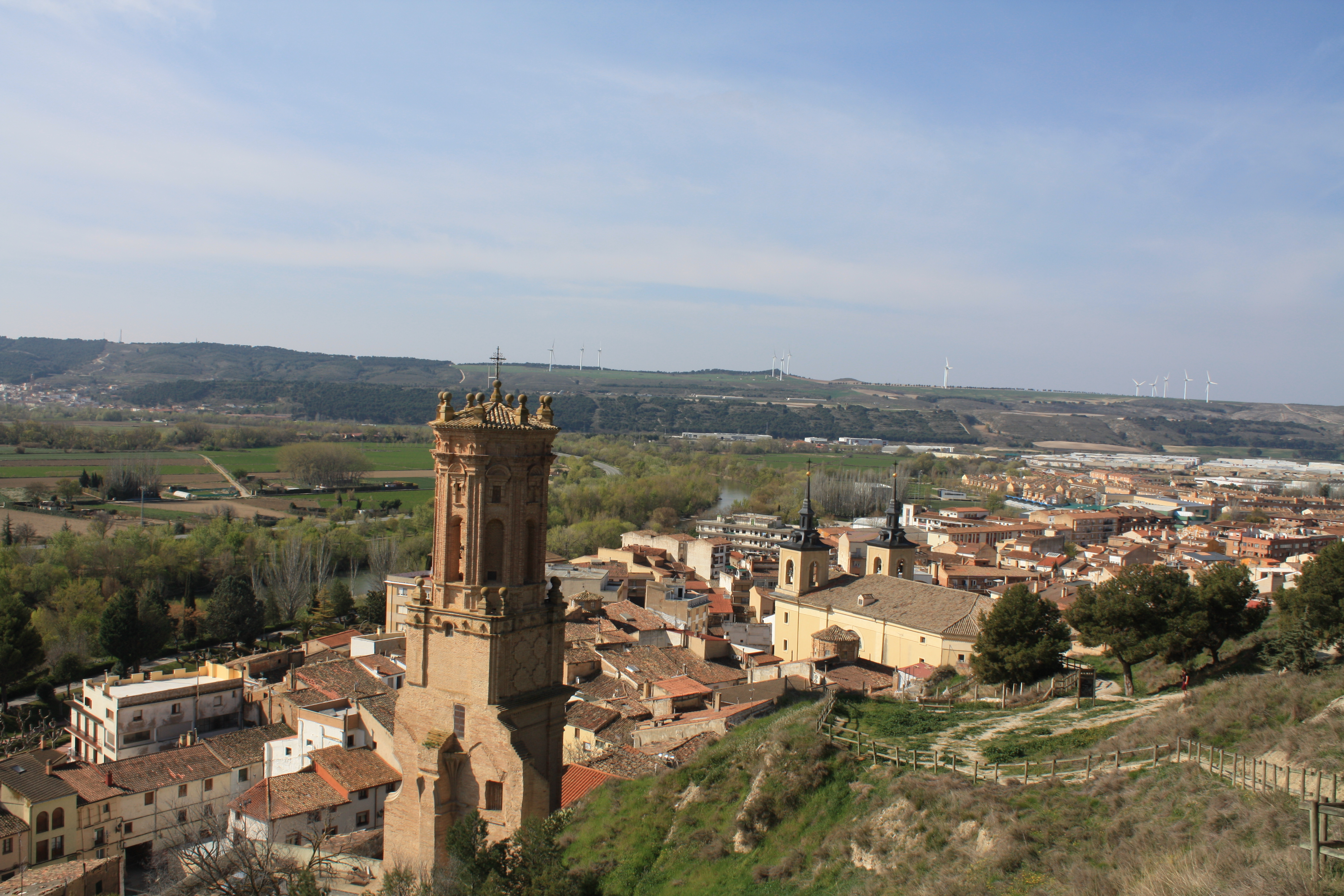

- Flag Coat of arms

- Location within Navarre Location within Spain
- Coordinates: 42°19′59″N 1°48′00″W
- Country: Spain
- Autonomous Community: Navarre
- Province: Navarre
- Merindad: Olite

Area
  - Total: 88.4 km^{2} (34.1 sq mi)

Population (2025-01-01)
  - Total: 6,071
  - Density: 68.7/km^{2} (178/sq mi)
- Website: www.aytoperalta.com

Peralta (Basque: Azkoien) is a town and municipality located in the province and autonomous community of Navarre, northern Spain. It is located 59.5 km from Pamplona, and is on the River Arga, a tributary of the Aragon River which itself flows into the Ebro. The population in 2020 was 5951 (INE) inhabitants. Peralta is one of twenty-seven municipalities that make up the Merindad de Olite in the southern part of Navarre.

== Symbology ==
=== Flag ===
The flag's description:
It's formed by a cloth of 2/3 proportion, red with the shield of the municipality in the center.

=== Shield ===
The Escutcheon of the municipality of Peralta has the following blazon:
A bridge of gold arches on a river, with a tower of the same material

== Geography ==
=== Location ===
It's located in the south part of the Foral Community of Navarre. It has an area of 89 km^{2} and has its limit with Falces (North), Marcilla (East), Funes (South) and Azagra (West)

=== Relief and hydrology ===
It's located in a zone formed by calize. Its river is River Arga.

== Demography ==
From:INE Archive

== Notable citizens ==
- Miguel Irigaray Gorría (1850-1903), politician
- Emilio Rodríguez Irazusta (1860-1919), inventor of the National Identity Document, a square is dedicated to him near to the church.
- Santos Jorge, musician and composer of national anthem of Panama.
- Carlos Zalduendo, France rugby league International, former president of the French Rugby League Federation et former president of Toulouse Olympique.

== Heritage ==
=== Religious Monuments ===
- Church of San Juan Evangelista.
- Bell tower: 18th-century tower. It was part of the original Church of San Juan Evangelista. It is the symbol of the town.
- Basilica of San Miguel (17th century). It was part of the Capuchin convent (17th century).[19]
- Hermitage of San Silvestre (17th century).
- Hermitage of San Pedro, in the municipality of Arlas. The current one was inaugurated in 1997; it replaced the original one, which was in ruins.
- Hermitage of Santa Lucía, located in the town center, is in ruins.
- Hermitage of the Virgen del Pero, located next to the bridge; its floor plan has been excavated.

=== Civil Monuments ===
- Watchtower: located at the top of the town. Dating from the mid-10th century.
- Portil de Lobos: Entrance gate to the pre-Romanesque enclosure located at the top of the hill.
- Baroque palace: from the 18th century, located on Calle Mayor.
- Gothic bridge over the Arga River.
