= Santos Jorge =

Panamanian composer of the national anthem (1870–1941)

Santos Jorge Amatriaim (1870–1941), composed the music for the Panamanian national anthem "Himno Istmeno".

Santos Jorge was born in Peralta, Navarre, Spain in November 1870. After studying music at the Conservatorio de Madrid, he moved to the Isthmus of Panama (then part of Colombia) in 1889 where he taught music. In 1892, he became the director of the military band of the Colombia Battalion.

He composed the music for the "Isthmian Hymn" (words written by Jeronimo de la Ossa).
