= David Malo (footballer) =

Spanish footballer

Personal information
- Full name: David Malo Azagra
- Date of birth: 21 August 1980 (age 46)
- Place of birth: Marcilla, Spain
- Height: 1.74 m (5 ft 8 1/2 in)
- Position: Right-back

Youth career
- Osasuna

Senior career*
Years	Team	Apps	(Gls)
1999–2001	Peña Sport	35	(4)
2001–2002	Eibar B	30	(0)
2002	Eibar	4	(0)
2002–2004	Real Unión	48	(2)
2004–2005	Peña Sport	34	(1)
2005–2006	Alfaro	38	(1)
2006–2007	Sant Andreu	37	(1)
2007–2009	Alicante	56	(0)
2009–2012	Ponferradina	70	(0)
2012–2014	Palamós	61	(3)
Total		413	(12)
- * Club domestic league appearances and goals

David Malo Azagra (born 21 August 1980 in Marcilla, Navarre) is a Spanish former professional footballer who played as a right-back.
