= Church of San Juan Evangelist (Peralta) =

Roman Catholic church in Navarre, Spain

The church of San Juan Evangelista de Peralta located in Peralta (Navarre, Spain) is a Catholic temple, neoclassical style, built in the first third of the 19th century. The main altarpiece stands out inside, built between 1766 and 1771 and considered one of the most excellent examples of the second half of the 18th century in Navarre, work of the Aragonese sculptor José Ramírez de Arellano, who had participated in the works of the chapel of the Basilica of Pilar in Zaragoza.

== The old parish ==
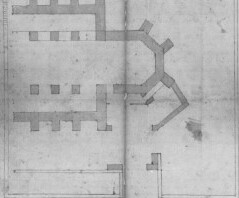
Plan of the old parish (1666)

At the end of the 16th century, a church dedicated to Saint John the Baptist was built at the foot of the Rock, where the medieval settlement had been established under the protection of the castle. Previously, there were churches, of which there is little information and only unclear archaeological remains.

The church was in a transitional style from Gothic to Renaissance. It had a central nave and two side naves, four pillars defining the naves and supporting the vault, a polygonal apse, and buttresses on the exterior. A plan drawn up in 1666 for the construction of the sacristy provides an idea of its layout.

In the 18th century, the Baroque tower was built and remains well restored today. By the end of the 18th century, the church, damaged by the earthworks on the hillside, was in ruins, so it was decided to build a new one on the plain, on Calle Mayor, which offered a safer and more accessible location for the local residents. The altarpieces and other furnishings from the old parish church were used for the new church.[1] While the new church was being built, worship was held in the chapel of the Capuchin convent.

== The new parish ==
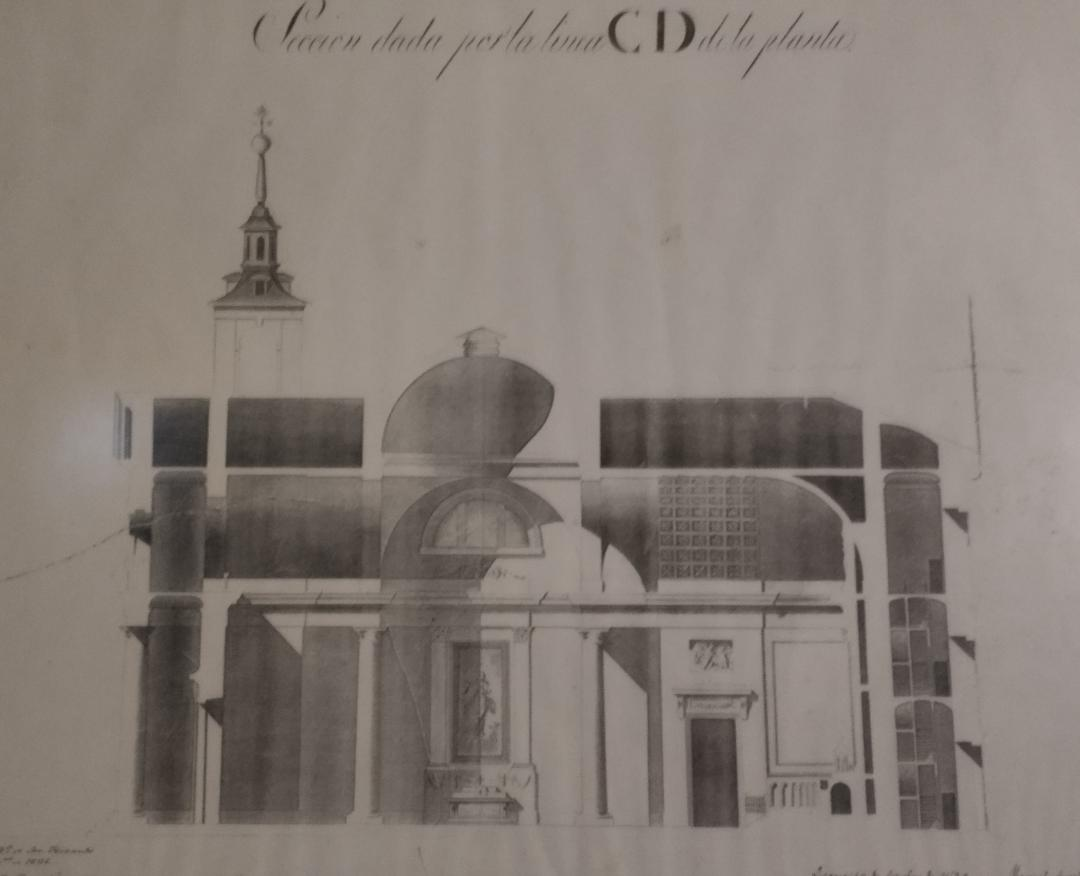
Section of the temple signed by the architect M.A. Chávarri

At the beginning of the 19th century, the current parish church was built, which like its predecessor was dedicated to Saint John the Evangelist. Thus, between 1826 and 1833, in accordance with the project of the architect Manuel Ángel Chávarri, who lived in Vitoria, a large temple was built in the neoclassical style, which was the prevailing style in religious and civil architecture of that time.

The façade is of the purest classicism. It has two sections: the lower one, made of ashlar stone, leads from a small staircase to a large, lintelled doorway with two large, set-back Tuscan columns supporting the entablature, which is emphasized only by a sober cornice. The weak foundation of the building, due to the failure of the foundations, is evident in the shifting of the central ashlars.

The large door leads to a small portico with two small side doors that allow access to the temple; the large central door is used for solemn ceremonies, such as processions.

In the second, upper body, made of plastered brick, there is only a semicircular arched window - a thermal window -, similar to those on the side facades.

The ensemble is completed by a triangular pediment with an oculus for the clock.

Architect Chávarri's project included two bell towers flanking the façade, thus giving it greater width. They could not be built at the time—it should be remembered that this coincided with the beginning of the First Carlist War—and were finally erected in 2002, in accordance with the original design.

The neoclassical austerity that prevails on the façade explains why there are no figurative ornamental motifs anywhere, nor, of course, sculptures.

=== Plant ===
The façade door leads into an atrium or vestibule; here, the large central door is used for solemn ceremonies, and the two smaller side doors are for the faithful. These doors lead into a small space that ultimately leads to the central nave. The left door also leads to the choir staircase, and the right door leads to the baptismal chapel. Its location is reminiscent of the original baptistery, which stood outside the church and was accessible only to those already baptized.

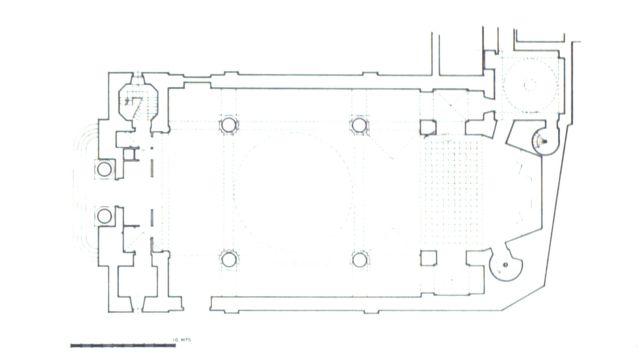
Plant of the Church of San Juan Evangelista, showing the different entrances to the temple

The building is spacious, with a wide central nave measuring 40 metres and two very narrow side naves, which seem to be designed more as corridors; in total it is 18 metres wide. On each side, the naves are defined by two large Tuscan columns, polychromed to resemble marble.

To properly accommodate the main altarpiece of the old parish church, a polygonal apse was designed instead of the semicircular one inspired by classical architecture. It is preceded by a large semicircular arch with coffered ceilings, in the Roman style, while the apse is closed off with a quarter-sphere vault. The four lintelled windows located at the head of the church were opened around 2000.

In the transept there is a lowered dome supported by pendentives.

Lighting comes from semicircular windows – “thermal windows” – in the classical style, which open into the façade and side walls.

A cornice runs along the temple and defines the lower part of the upper part, where the windows are located. The text that runs along the cornice is modern and comes from the Gospel of St. John.

The sacristy is located at the head of the church, on the Gospel side, to the visitor's left. Like the rest of the building, it is neoclassical in style; it has a square floor plan and is covered by a dome.

=== Main altarpiece ===
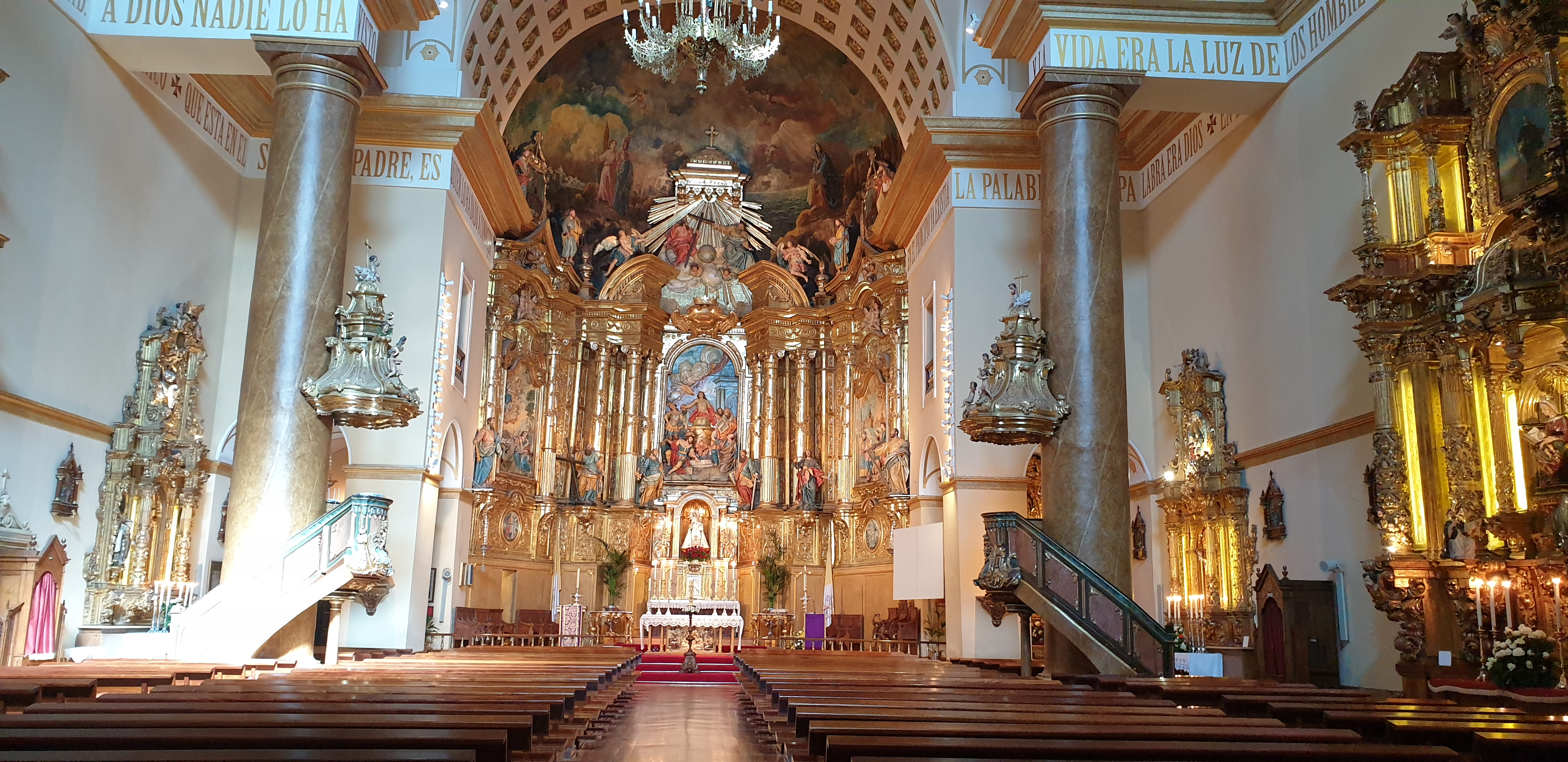
Presbytery, central and lateral naves, and Tuscan columns

The main altarpiece, built between 1766 and 1771—as already mentioned, it came from the previous parish church—is the work of the renowned Aragonese sculptor José Ramírez de Arellano, who, among other notable works, had participated in the construction of the chapel of the Basilica of El Pilar in Zaragoza. García Gainza considers this altarpiece to be "one of the most excellent examples of the second half of the 18th century in Navarre."

It is designed to highlight the miraculously thwarted martyrdom of the temple's patron saint, as shown in the large high relief in the center of the altarpiece. To focus attention on this point, eight large columns, along with the entablature and split pediment that crown it, have been arranged in converging perspective. In front of the columns are the round sculptures of Saint Andrew, Saint Peter, Saint Paul, and Saint James.The objects that identify them—cross, keys, etc.—were added later. Los objetos que los identifican -cruz, llaves, etc.- son añadidos posteriores.

Above the tabernacle, protected by a small temple, is the 18th-century statue of the Virgin of Nieva. In this century, the Dominican convent in Pamplona spread devotion to this Marian devotion throughout Navarre. She is the patron saint of Peralta. As was common at that time, when sufficient resources were available, it was decided to expand the main altarpiece with the construction of two side altarpieces. In March 1772, the work was commissioned to Diego de Camporredondo, based in Calahorra, who had been working for the parishes of the Zona Media and Ribera de Navarra for thirty years. The artistic result of his work is notably inferior to that of Ramírez de Arellano. This contract cost Camporredondo his life, as he died on the town's bridge in an altercation with Fermín Ochoa, a doctor from Peralta, who was outraged that the commission had not been given to his brother José, a sculptor living in Madrid.

The altarpiece on the right side depicts the apocryphal episode of Saint John of Ephesus, who was saved from death by poisoning himself with the cup he holds, which had been offered to him by Aristodemus, high priest of the Temple of Artemis. To demonstrate its deadly power, two men condemned to capital punishment had been forced to drink from it, which is why their corpses appear at the bottom of the relief.

The altarpiece on the left reproduces the vision of Saint John on the island of Patmos described in his Book of Revelation: “He saw a woman clothed with the sun, the moon under her feet, and on her head a crown of twelve stars” and a seven-headed dragon that “with its tail was dragging a third of the stars of the sky and hurling them to earth.” In the lower right corner is the eagle, symbol of the Evangelist, holding the inkwell in its beak. Saint John’s writing quill is a later addition. Sculptures of the apostles Philip and Thomas appear at the outer ends of both altarpieces.

=== Side altarpieces ===
In the left nave, from the entrance to the temple to the presbytery, there is:

- Crucifix (16th century), flanked by Solomonic columns
- Altarpiece of San Blas, Baroque, 18th century
- Altarpiece of the Immaculate Conception, 18th century. The image of the Virgin is modern.

In the nave on the right are:

- Baptismal chapel. The font has been moved to the head of the right aisle. It is made of pink marble and dates from the time the parish church was built, as do two holy water fonts at the entrance.
- Altarpiece of the Virgin of the Rosary, was commissioned in 1745. The image of the Virgin that presides over it is from the 16th century.
- Altarpiece of Saint Joseph, in Rococo style, dated 1757
- Altarpiece of the Heart of Jesus, Baroque, 18th century. The central sculpture is modern.
- At the head, as mentioned above, there is a baroque altarpiece (18th century) dedicated to Saint Peter, but presided over by a modern image of Saint Francis Xavier.

=== Choir ===
The wrought iron railing, the stalls, the lectern and the crucifix that tops it come from the old parish church.

The organ dates from the late 18th century, features horizontal pipes tapering toward the center and is decorated with Rococo-style paintings and sculptures. Its notable features include "its 50-note keyboard (unique in Navarre), 32-foot counters, and two trumpets (inner and outer)."

== Bibliography ==
- Fernández Gracia, R. “La actividad de Diego de Camporredondo en Navarra y el trágico fin de su vida en 1772”, Kalakorikos, 1996, n. 1, pp. 109-124.
- García Gainza, M.C. Catálogo Monumental de Navarra. T. III. Olite. Pamplona, Institución Príncipe de Viana, 1986, pp. 390-392.
- González Velasco, C. La villa de Peralta de Navarra. Fuentes para su historia, tradiciones y leyendas. Peralta, Ayuntamiento, 2024.
- Idoate Ezquieta, C. “Un plano de la antigua iglesia de San Juan Evangelista de Peralta”, Revista Príncipe de Viana, 1982, n. 166-167, pp. 583-586.
- Larumbe Martín, M. El academicismo y la arquitectura del siglo XIX en Navarra. Pamplona, Gobierno de Navarra, 1990.
- Navarra. Guía y mapaPamplona, Caja de Ahorros de Navarra, 1986.
- Segura Jiménez, J.A. Diego de Camporredondo y el arte barroco y rococó en Calahorra y su comarca. Logroño, Instituto de Estudios Riojanos, 1994.
