= Pedro Iturralde =

Spanish musician (1929–2020)

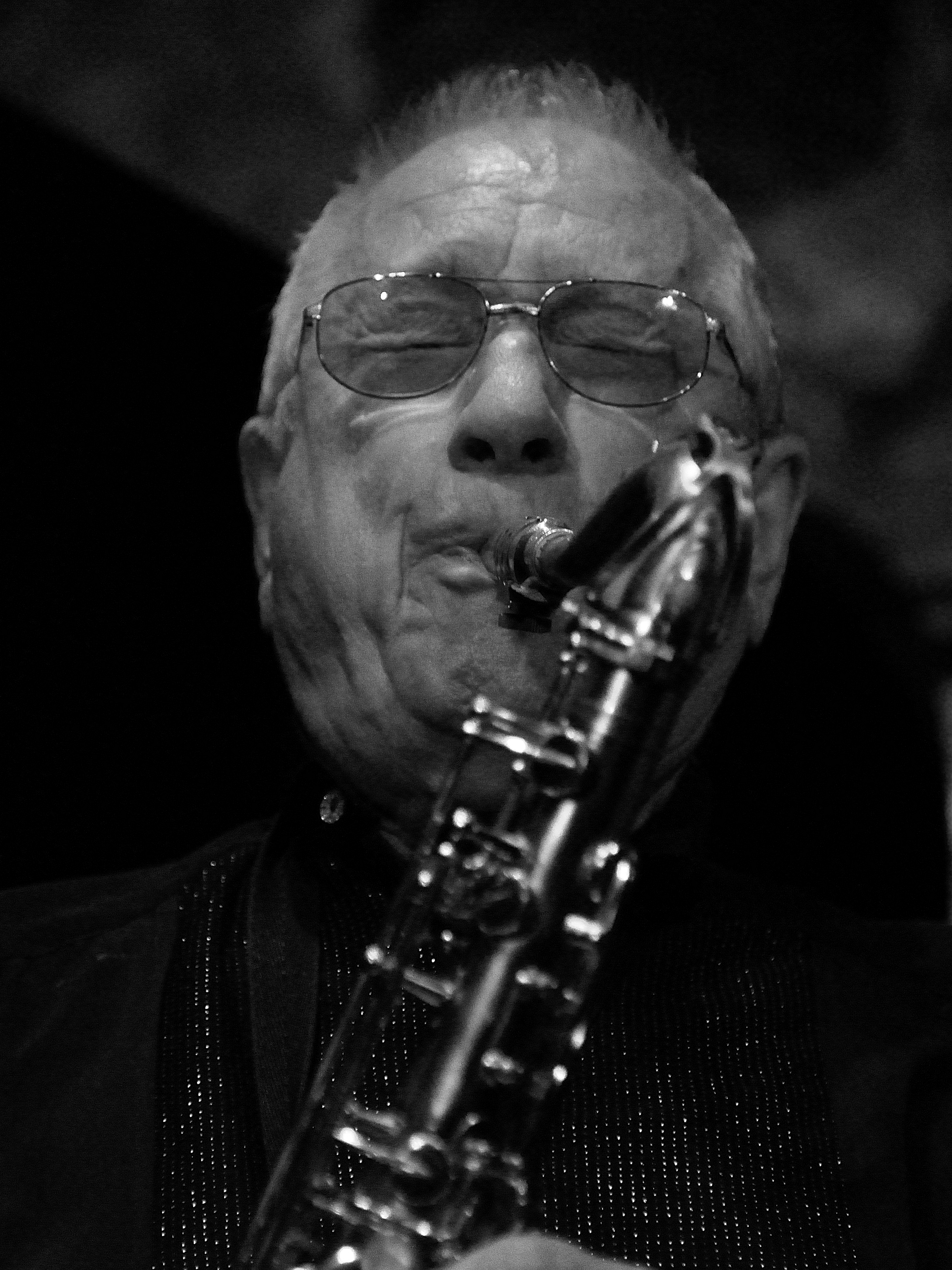
- Iturralde performing in 2013

Background information
- Born: Pedro Iturralde Ochoa; 13 July 1929; Falces, Spain
- Died: 1 November 2020 (aged 91) Madrid, Spain
- Genres: Jazz
- Occupations: Musician, composer
- Instruments: Saxophone, clarinet, flute

Pedro Iturralde Ochoa (13 July 1929 – 1 November 2020) was a Spanish jazz saxophonist, teacher and composer.

== Biography ==
Iturralde was born in Falces on 3 July 1929. He began his musical studies with his father and performed in his first professional engagements on saxophone at age eleven. He graduated from the Royal Conservatory of Music in Madrid, where he studied clarinet, piano, and harmony.

He went on to lead his own jazz quartet at the W. Jazz Club in Madrid, experimenting with the combined use of flamenco and jazz, and making recordings for the Blue Note label. In 1972 he undertook further study in harmony and arranging at the Berklee College of Music in Boston. He taught saxophone at the Madrid Royal Conservatory from 1978 until his retirement in 1994.

He appeared in Spain and abroad as a soloist with the Spanish National Orchestra under the baton of Rafael Frühbeck de Burgos, Sergiu Celibidache, Igor Markevitch, and others.

When he was 20 years old he composed Czárdás for saxophone. He dedicated the present version of the work, orchestrated by his brother Javier, to a friend, saxophonist Theodore Kerkezos.

He made recordings with the renowned flamenco guitarists Paco de Lucía (Columbia YS-2072-H, 1967 and Hiaspavox, 1968), Pepe de Antequerra (Columbia YS-2072-H, 1967) and Paco Cepero (CBS, 1975). He also recorded with jazz vocalist Donna Hightower on her I'm In Love with Love album (Columbia, 1974) and arranged/conducted on her El Jazz y Donna Hightower album (Columbia, 1975).

He died in Madrid on 1 November 2020.

== Discography ==
=== As leader ===
- Jazz Flamenco (Hispavox, 1967)
- Jazz Flamenco 2 (Hispavox, 1968)
- Flamenco Studio (CBS, 1976)
- Los Ojos de Eva (Hispavox, 1982)
- Fabuloso (Hispavox, 1982)
- Una Noche en el Central (Nueva Década, 1994)
- Memorias (Sonograf, 1998) – with Feeling Sax Ensemble
- Etnofonías (Dado Dada, 1999)

With Pedro Iturralde Quartet

- Pedro Iturralde Quartet (Hispavox/Fresh Sound Records, 1986) – with Hampton Hawes

With Pedro Iturralde Quintet

- Flamenco-Jazz (SABA, 1968) – with Paco de Lucía

=== As composer ===
- Juan M. Jiménez, Esteban Ocaña and Claude Delangle: Complete Music for Saxophone and Piano (Naxos, 2016)
