= Abrego (surname) =

Ábrego is a Spanish surname. Notable people with the surname include:

- Anyolí Ábrego (born 1987),Panamian model
- Cris Abrego, American television producer and businessman
- Francisco de Abrego (d. 1574), Roman Catholic bishop
- Gabriel Martínez-Ábrego (born 1998), Mexican motorcycle racer
- Gaspar Flores de Abrego (1781–1836), American politician
- Johnny Abrego (born 1962), American baseball player
- Jorge Abrego (born 1964), Salvadoran football player
- Joshua Abrego (born 1986), Mexican football player
- Juan García Ábrego (born 1944), Mexican drug lord
- Kilmar Armando Abrego Garcia (born 1995), Salvadoran immigrant to the United States
- Mercedes Abrego (d. 1813), Colombian revolutionary
