= Marcilla =

Town in Navarra, Spain

Coordinates: 42°20′N 1°44′W

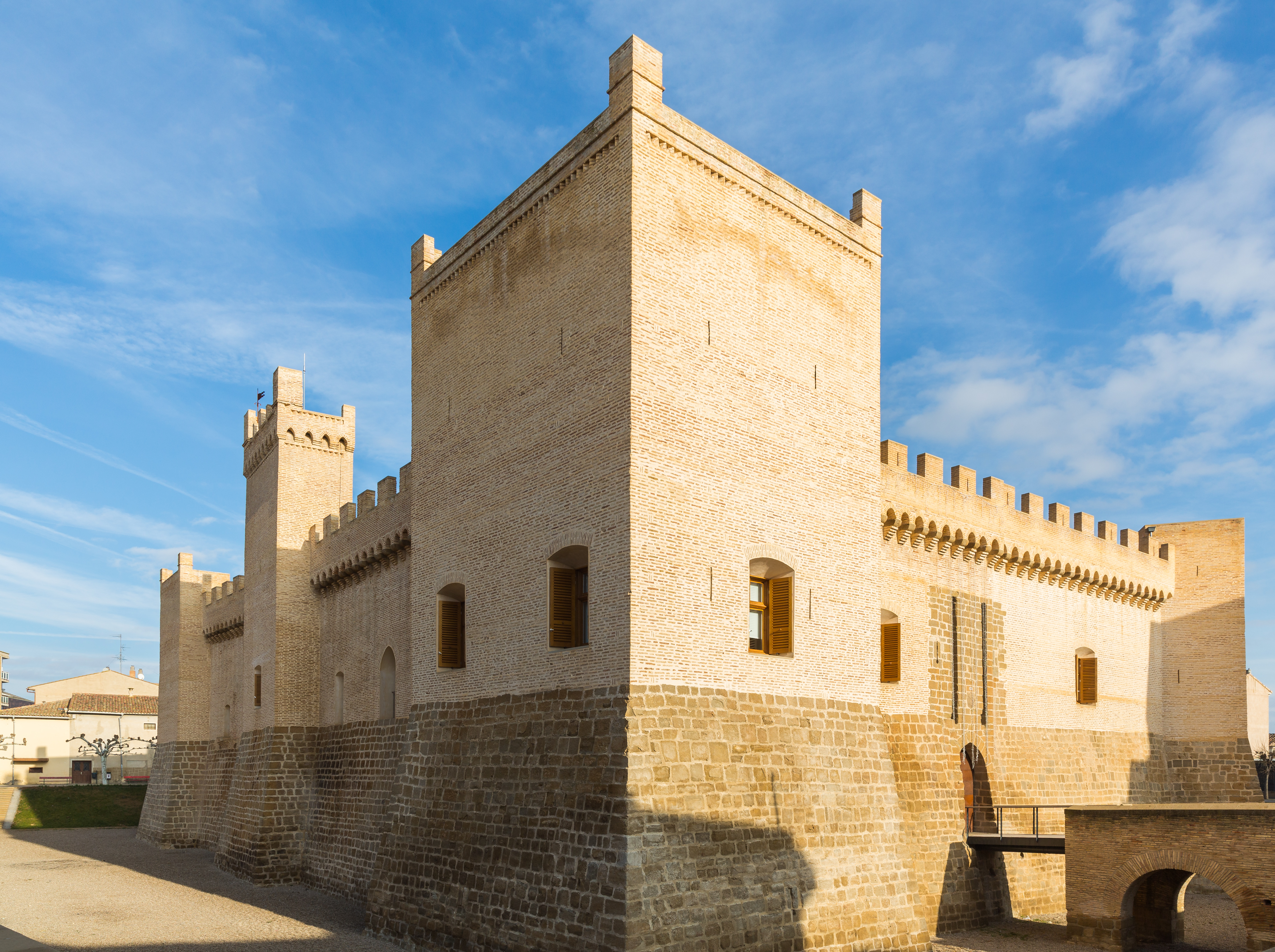
The restored Palacial Castle of Marcilla (2015 photograph).

Marcilla (Basque: Martzilla) is a town and municipality located in the province and autonomous community of Navarre, northern Spain. Its population was at 2,821 inhabitants as of 2016.

Marcilla castle was built by Pedro de Peralta y Ezpeleta, father of Pedro de Peralta y Ezpeleta, in the 15th century. It was the seat of the marquises of Falces for some four centuries, who here kept Tizona , the reputed sword of El Cid (now in Museo de Burgos). The castle was restored during 2009–2012.

== Notable people ==
- David Malo Azagra, retired footballer
