= Romain Mencarini =

French rugby league footballer

Personal information
- Born: 4 August 1989 (age 36) France
- Height: 1.80 m (5 ft 11 in)
- Weight: 101 kg (15 st 13 lb)

Playing information
- Position: Prop
Club
Years	Team	Pld	T	G	FG	P
2007–2014	Saint-Esteve XIII Catalan	87	4	0	0	16
2014	Palau XIII Broncos	15	0	0	0	0
2015–18	Lézignan Sangliers	52	3	0	0	12
2018	RC Baho XIII	1	0	0	0	0
2019–	Saint-Esteve Catalan	2	0	0	0	0
	Total	157	7	0	0	28
- Source: As of 11 January 2021

Romain Mencarini is a French rugby league player currently playing for Saint-Esteve XIII Catalan in the Elite One Championship. He previously played for Lézignan Sangliers and Palau Broncos in Elite One Championship. He plays prop.

== Playing career ==
=== Saint-Estève XIII Catalan ===
On 27 Aug 2019 it was reported that he had re-signed for Saint-Estève XIII Catalan in the Elite One Championship
