= Jeronimo de la Ossa =

Panamanian writer of the anthem (1847–1907)

"Himno Istmeño" (Instrumental - brass band)
"Himno Istmeño" was adopted in 1906. This is an instrumental version by the United States Navy Band.

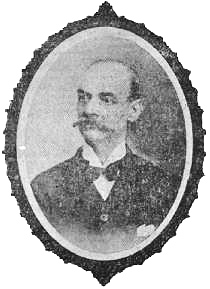
Jeronimo de la Ossa

Jerónimo de la Ossa ( Panama City, April 9, 1847 - Panama City, 1907) was a Panamanian romantic poet, lyricist, and diplomat. He wrote the lyrics of the national anthem of Panama Himno Istmeño. His brother was Jose Francisco de la Ossa, the mayor of Panama City.

He studied in Chile, where he graduated as a civil engineer. He represented at the Chilean consulate in Panama and worked for the French Canal Company. He was the first president of the Sociedad El Progreso del Isthmo.

His poems were characterized by their simplicity and humility. His work is scattered in the various weekly newspapers and magazines of the time, however his best verses were composed when he was a student.

The importance of this poet is primarily in being the author of the lyrics of the National Anthem of Panama, where a pronounced patriotic accent is denoted. He also wrote the poem "The Source of Paradise." Today, Jerónimo Ossa is considered one of the great poets of the 20th century.
