= Simon Worrall =

English rugby league footballer

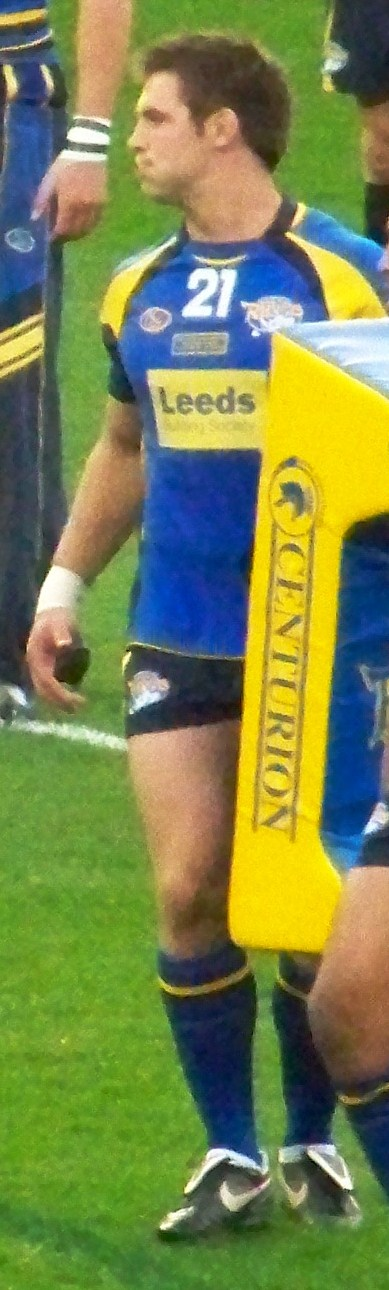

Personal information
- Born: 10 October 1984 (age 41) Doncaster, South Yorkshire, England
- Height: 6 ft 0 in (1.83 m)
- Weight: 14 st 2 lb (90 kg)

Playing information

Rugby union
Club
Years	Team	Pld	T	G	FG	P
2006–07	Leeds Tykes	2	0	0	0	0

Rugby league
- Position: Second-row
Club
Years	Team	Pld	T	G	FG	P
2007–09	Leeds Rhinos	25	1	0	0	4
2007 (loan)	→Doncaster	4	0	0	0	0
2010 (loan)	→Toulouse Olympique	7	0	0	0	0
	Total	36	1	0	0	4
- Source: As of 25 May 2021

Simon Worrall is a former English rugby league footballer for Leeds Rhinos and rugby union for Leeds Carnegie.

His usual position was second row or at loose-forward.

He made his début in a win over Harlequins RL in March 2008.
