= List of people known as the Gouty =

The Gouty is an epithet applied to:

- Bermudo II of León (c. 953–999), King of Galicia and of León
- Piero di Cosimo de' Medici (1416–1469), de facto ruler of Florence from 1464 to 1469
