= Gilles Dumas =

French rugby coach and former player

Personal information
- Born: 14 December 1962 (age 63) Saint-Gaudens, Haute-Garonne, Occitania, France

Playing information
- Position: Fullback, Scrum-half, Stand-off
Club
Years	Team	Pld	T	G	FG	P
	Saint-Gaudens
Representative
Years	Team	Pld	T	G	FG	P
1986–93	France	27	7	27	1	83

Coaching information
Club
Years	Team	Gms	W	D	L	W%
2008–13	Toulouse Olympique
–	Saint-Gaudens
	Total	0	0	0	0
Representative
Years	Team	Gms	W	D	L	W%
1998–03	France	24	10	0	14	42
- Source: As of 12 October 2023

Gilles Dumas is a French rugby league football coach and former player. He is the coach of French Elite One Championship club, Saint-Gaudens Bears and previously Toulouse Olympique. He previously coached the French national team while coaching Saint Gaudens in the Elite 1 Championship in the 1990s and 2000s. Dumas was a France national representative goal-kicking fullback, scrum- or stand-off half back in his playing days during the 1980s and 1990s.

== Playing career ==
In early 1986 Dumas was selected to play for the France national rugby league team at fullback in a match against Great Britain for the 1985–88 World Cup tournament, scoring a try and kicking a goal on his national debut. During the 1986 Kangaroo tour of Great Britain and France Dumas played for France in both Test matches against Australia, the first at fullback and the second from the bench. Playing as a scrum half but eventually settling into the stand-off position, he continued representing France in matches for the 1989–92 World Cup tournament as well.

== Coaching career ==
Dumas starting coaching the France national rugby league team in 1998. He coached the French in their campaign for the 2000 World Cup. Dumas was national coach for the 2001 French rugby league tour of New Zealand and Papua New Guinea. During the 2002 New Zealand rugby league tour of Great Britain and France he coached the France national team as they hosted the Kiwis. During the 2003 Kangaroo tour of Great Britain and France Dumas coached the France national team as they hosted the Australians.

In May 2008, Dumas was appointed head coach of Toulouse Olympique ahead of the 2009 season, the club's first participating in the RFL Championship. From June 2013, he worked alongside assistant coaches Sylvain Houlès and Adam Innes, before departing the club in December 2013.
