= Sylvain Houles =

French RL coach and former France international rugby league footballer

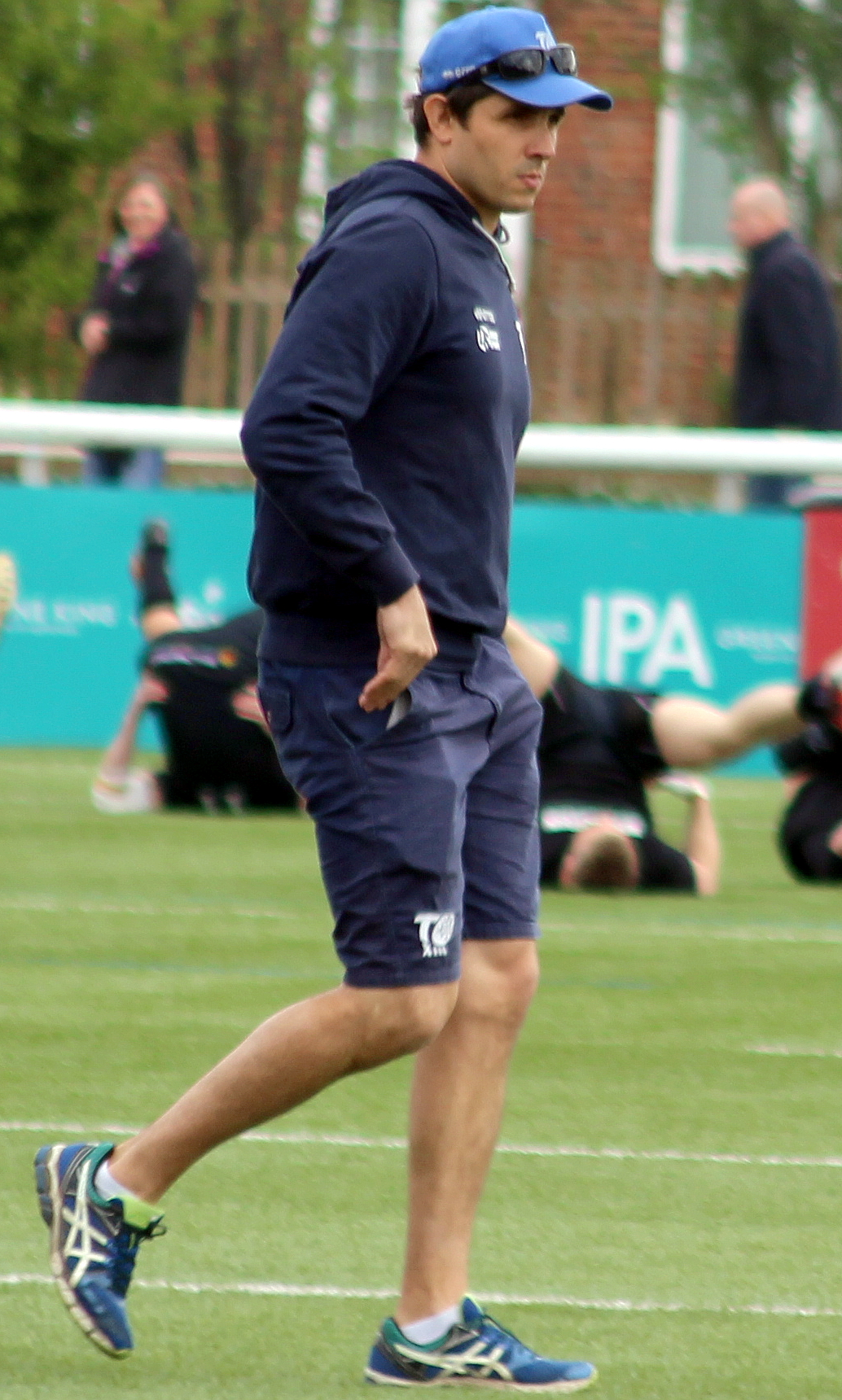

Personal information
- Born: 3 August 1981 (age 45) France
- Height: 6 ft 2 in (1.87 m)
- Weight: 15 st 2 lb (96 kg)

Playing information
- Position: Wing, Centre, Loose forward
Club
Years	Team	Pld	T	G	FG	P
1999	XIII Catalan
2000	Huddersfield Giants	7	1	0	0	4
2001–02	London Broncos	30	12	0	0	48
2003	Dewsbury Rams	6	3	0	0	12
2003–05	Wakefield Trinity Wildcats	10	1	0	0	4
2007–08	Toulouse Olympique	17	1	0	0	4
2009–12	Toulouse Olympique	57	5	0	0	20
	Total	127	23	0	0	92
Representative
Years	Team	Pld	T	G	FG	P
2001–07	France	2	0	0	0	0

Coaching information
Club
Years	Team	Gms	W	D	L	W%
2013–	Toulouse Olympique	234	157	3	74	67
- Source: As of 3 November 2026

Sylvain Houles (French pronunciation: [silvɛ̃ ul]; born 3 August 1981) is a French professional rugby league coach who is the head coach of Toulouse Olympique in the Super League and a former professional rugby league footballer.

== Playing career ==
As a player, Houles was a French international who toured New Zealand and Papua New Guinea in 2001 and appeared in the Super League for the Huddersfield Giants, the London Broncos and the Wakefield Trinity Wildcats. He also played in the Championship for the Dewsbury Rams and Toulouse Olympique. His position of choice was initially on the wing or in the centre, but in his later career he played as a loose forward.

== Coaching career ==
Houles combined playing with an assistant coach role in his later career. He was appointed assistant coach at Toulouse Olympique in May 2013, working alongside Gilles Dumas. He was named head coach in December 2013.

On 10 October 2021, Houles coached Toulouse to victory over Featherstone in the Million Pound Game which saw the club promoted to the Super League for the first time in their history.

Toulouse Olympique would go on to be relegated the following season from the Super League after finishing bottom of the table. Houles would later comment saying that the relegation had done "untold damage" to the club.

In the 2025 RFL Championship season, Houles guided Toulouse to a 2nd-placed finish and victory in the grand final against York.
