= Timothy Wynn =

Australian rugby league footballer (born 1985)

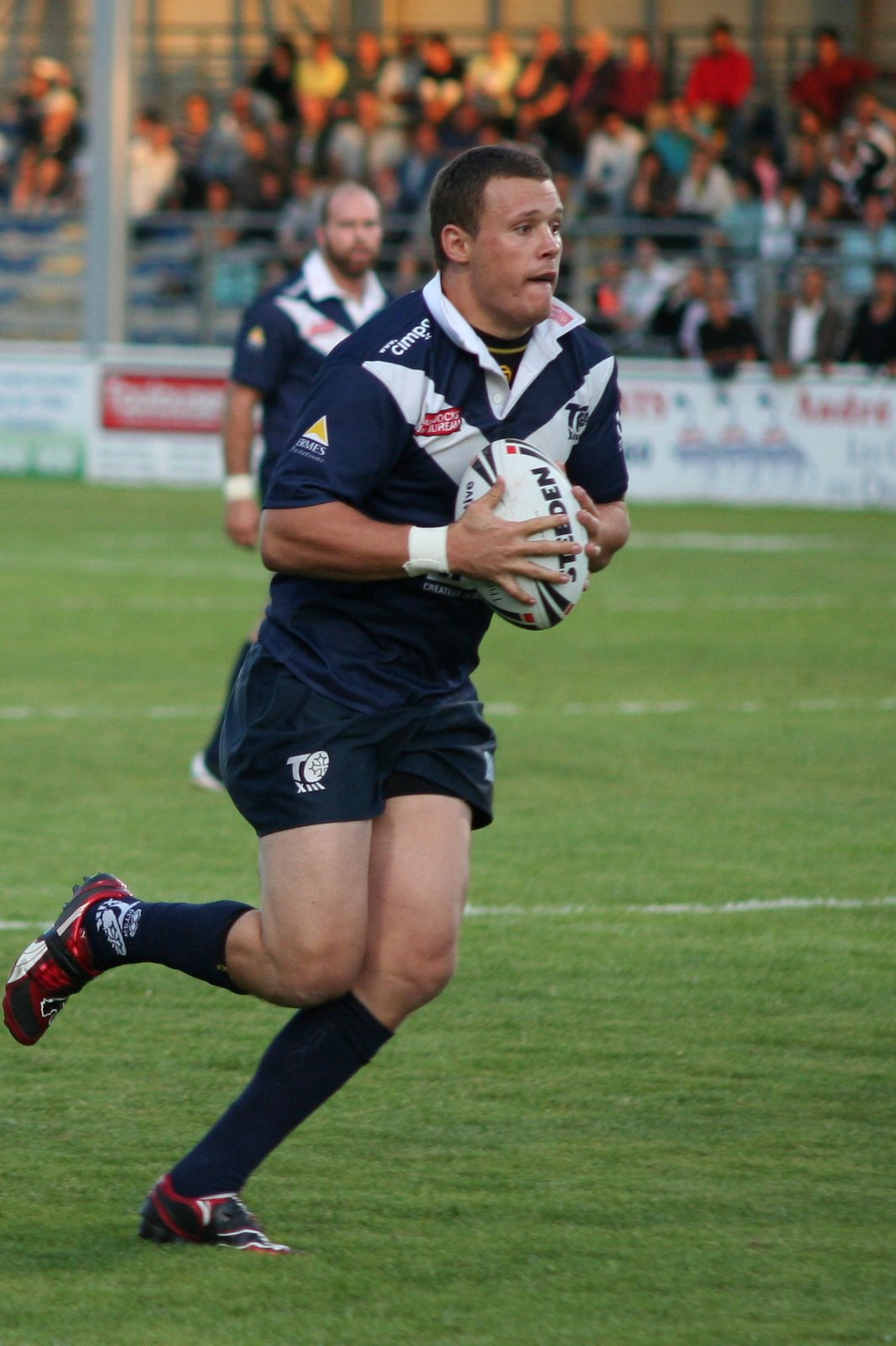

Personal information
- Born: 1 May 1985 (age 41) Australia
- Height: 189 cm (6 ft 2 in)
- Weight: 105 kg (16 st 7 lb)

Playing information
- Position: Second-row
Club
Years	Team	Pld	T	G	FG	P
2008–2009	Wentworthville
2009–2010	Toulouse Olympique	18	3			12
	Total	18	3	0	0	12
- Source: As of 11 January 2010

Timothy Wynn (born 19 July 1985) is a former Australian professional rugby league footballer for French club Toulouse Olympique in the Co-operative Championship. He is the son of Peter Wynn famous for his achievement at Parramatta Eels. Timothy Wynn started as a junior at the Parramatta Eels (NSW Cup and Jersey Flegg Cup) in 2007 and he also played at Seven Hills JCB (A grade). The next year, in 2008 at the Wentworthville Magpies in the Western suburbs of Sydney, in the Jim Beam Cup. He primarily plays as a second row.
