= Nathan Wynn =

Australian rugby league player (born 1986)

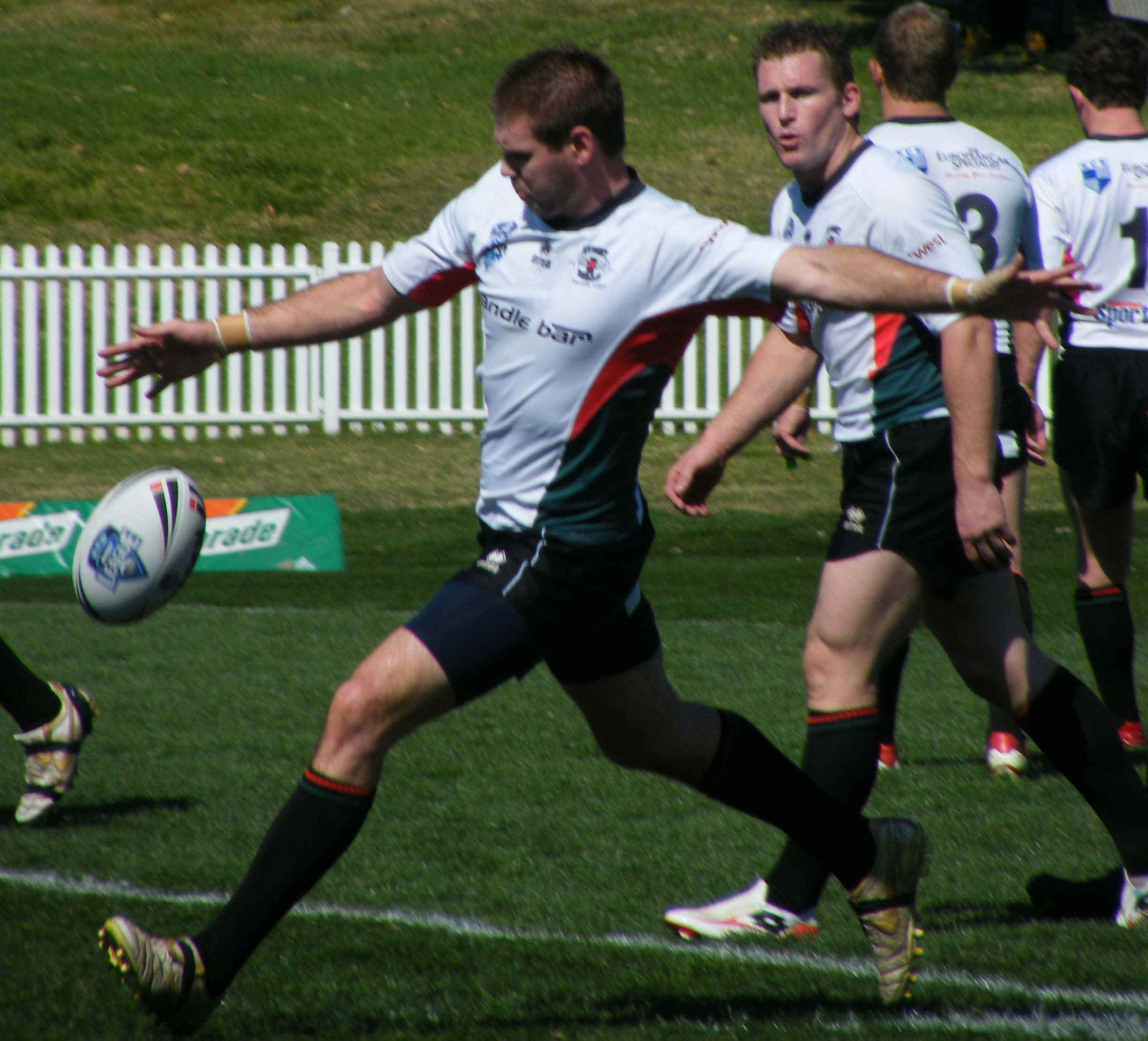
- Wynn playing for the Sydney Bulls

Personal information
- Born: 10 January 1986 (age 40) Australia
- Height: 1.86 m (6 ft 1 in)
- Weight: 92 kg (14 st 7 lb)

Playing information
- Position: Halfback
Club
Years	Team	Pld	T	G	FG	P
2007–08	Sydney Bulls	13	14	168	0	392
2009–10	Toulouse Olympique	17	5	76	0	172
2010–13	FC.Lézignan	44	13	167	3	389
	Total	74	32	411	3	953
- Source: As of 17 February 2018

Nathan Wynn is a former rugby league footballer. His team position was Scrum Half. He played for Canterbury Bulldogs, Sydney Bulls and St George Illawarra Dragons, who won the 2005 Jersey Flegg Cup. In the 2009 season he was key playmaker for Toulouse Olympique in RFL Championship. Ahead of the 2010–11 season he joined for FC Lézignan XIII, who went on to retain the Lord Derby Cup and the Elite 1 championship that year. At the end of the 2012–13 season he left Lézignan to return to Australia.
