= Yoan Tisseyre =

France international rugby league footballer

Personal information
- Born: 8 May 1989 (age 36) France
- Height: 1.77 m (5 ft 10 in)
- Weight: 92 kg (14 st 7 lb)

Playing information
- Position: Second-row
Club
Years	Team	Pld	T	G	FG	P
2007–09	Lézignan Sangliers	29	12	0	0	48
2009–10	Toulouse Olympique	3	2	0	0	8
2011–20	Lézignan Sangliers	154	33	0	0	136
2020–	Limoux Grizzlies	22	2	0	0	8
Representative
Years	Team	Pld	T	G	FG	P
2010	France	1	0	0	0	0
- Source: itsrugby.fr championshipstats.rlfans.com As of 25 October 2022

Yoan Tisseyre (born 8 May 1989), is a French professional rugby league footballer who currently plays for XIII Limouxin in the Elite One Championship. and has represented France, as a second-row. He previously played for FC Lezignan and Toulouse Olympique Championship.

== Playing career ==
=== Limoux Grizzlies ===
On 30 Jun 2020 it was reported that he had signed for Limoux Grizzlies in the Elite One Championship

== International ==
He made his sole international appearances from the bench in the 11-12 loss to Wales on 23 Oct 2010
