= Colada =

One of the swords of Spanish knight El Cid

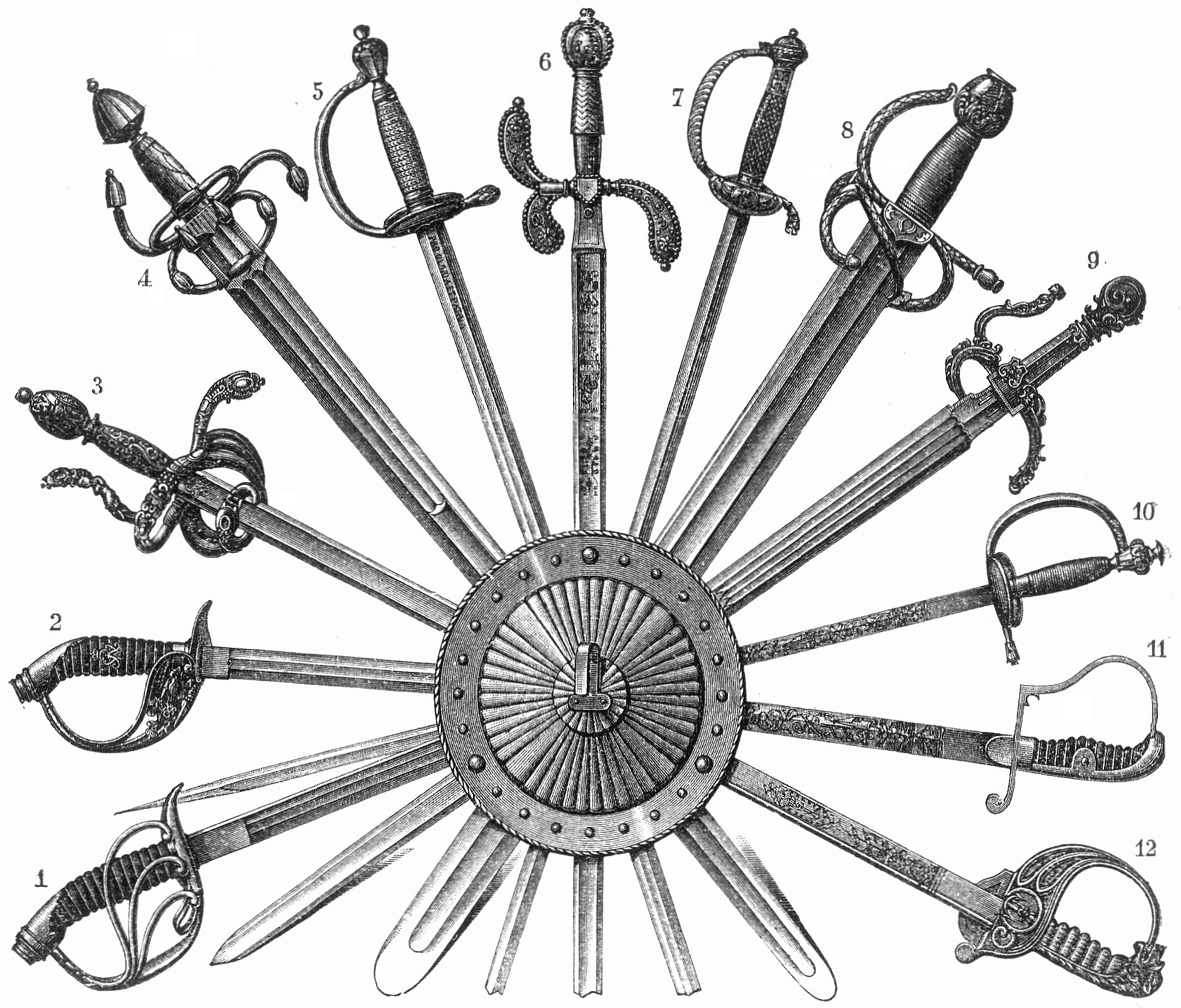
Set of swords, Colada is no. 8

Colada is one of the two best-known swords, along with Tizona, of El Cid. Won in combat from the Count of Barcelona, the sword was presented (along with Tizona) to his sons in law. According to the heroic verses of the Cantar de mio Cid, after his sons-in-law beat his daughters and then abandoned them on the side of the road, El Cid asked for his gifts to be returned. Afterward, he bestowed the sword upon one of his knights, Martín Antolínez.

Though its authenticity is doubted, a blade named Colada and traditionally identified with that of El Cid, with the addition of a 16th-century hilt, is preserved in the Royal Palace of Madrid. It is necessary to add that El Cid's sword is displayed in the Museum as the "Tizona" Sword, the name Colada could have easily been appointed by popular culture since bards of the time shared stories of folklorical nature which were far from being based on historical facts.

According to Sebastián de Covarrubias, Colada clearly means a sword made from "acero colado" ("cast steel"), a process of alloyed steel without impurities.

As with Tizona, Colada appears in the epic poem Cantar de mio Cid as a sword that frightens unworthy opponents if wielded by a brave warrior. El Cid gives the sword to Martín Antolínez as a present, and he uses it in the duel against the infante Diego González.

Verses 3648-3665: Martin Antolinez mano metio al espada. Relumbra tod el campo: tanto es limpia e clara. Diol vn colpe, de trauiessol tomaua. El casco de somo apart gelo echaua. Las moncluras del yelmo todas gelas cortaua. Alla leuo el almofar, fata la cofia legaua. La cofia e el almofar todo gelo leuaua. Raxol los de la cabeça, bien a la carne legaua. Lo vno cayo en el campo e lo al suso fincaua. Quando este colpe a ferido Colada la preçiada. Vio Diego Gonçalez que no escaparie con el alma. Boluio la rienda al cauallo por tornasse de cara. Esora Martin Antolinez reçibiol con el espada: Un colpel dio de plano, con lo agudo nol tomaua. Ya Gonçalez espada tiene en mano, mas non la ensayaua. Esora el ynfante tan grandes voces daua: -¡Valme, Dios glorioso, Señor, cúriam deste espada!-	Translation; Martín Antolínez took his sword in hand, it lights up all the field, it is so clean and bright, he gave him a blow, he hit him a glancing blow, it broke away the top of the helmet, it cut away all the helmet straps, it tore off the mailed hood, and reached the coif, the coif and the hood all were ripped away, it cut the hairs on his head, and it reached well into the flesh, one part fell to the ground and the other remained. When precious Colada has struck this blow, Diego González saw that he would not escape with his soul, he turned his horse to face his opponent. At that moment Martín Antolínez hit him with his sword, he struck him broadside, with the cutting edge he did not hit him. Diego González has sword in hand, but he does not use it, at that moment the infante began to shout, -Help me, God, glorious Lord, and protect me from this sword!-

== See also ==
- Lobera
