= Nicolas Fauré =

French rugby league player (b.1984)

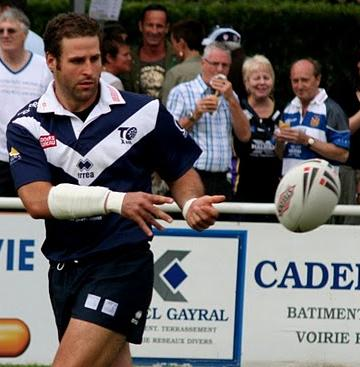

Personal information
- Born: 30 May 1984 (age 40); France
- Height: 1.91 m (6 ft 3 in)
- Weight: 104 kg (16 st 5 lb)

Playing information
- Position: Prop
Club
Years	Team	Pld	T	G	FG	P
2007–08	Toulouse Olympique	17	0	0	0	0
2009–17	Toulouse Olympique	38	2	0	0	8
	Total	55	2	0	0	8
- Source: As of 5 January 2010

Nicolas Fauré is a French professional rugby league footballer He played for Toulouse Olympique in the RFL Championship, as a prop.
