= Olivier Pramil =

Former France international rugby league footballer

Personal information
- Born: 4 June 1979 (age 47) France
- Height: 6 ft 0 in (184 cm)
- Weight: 16 st 1 lb (102 kg)

Playing information
- Position: Prop, Second-row
Club
Years	Team	Pld	T	G	FG	P
1996–????	New York Knights
????–2009	Toulouse Olympique
2005(loan)	→Hull Kingston Rovers	1	0	0	0	0
2010–??	RC Lescure-Arthes XIII
	Total	1	0	0	0	0
Representative
Years	Team	Pld	T	G	FG	P
2002–04	France	13

Olivier Pramil (born June 4, 1979) is a French professional rugby league footballer currently playing for RC Lescure-Arthes XIII. He has previously played for the New York Knights rugby league team in the AMNRL and Toulouse Olympique in the Co-Operative Championship as well as the France national rugby league team. His position is at Prop or Second-row.

== Playing career ==
=== RC Lescure-Arthes XIII ===
On 21 Oct 2009 it was reported that he had signed for RC Lescure-Arthes XIII in the Elite Two Championship

=== International ===
He made his début in a 2002 Mediterranean Cup match v Lebanon, coming off the inter-change bench on 2 Nov 2002; France lost 6-36
