= Carlos Zalduendo =

France international rugby league footballer

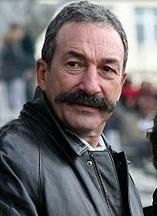
- Zalduendo at the France-Australia match in the Four Nations, 2009

Personal information
- Full name: Carlos Zalduendo
- Born: 17 August 1952 (age 73) Peralta, Navarre, Spain

Playing information
- Position: Prop, Second-row, Hooker
Club
Years	Team	Pld	T	G	FG	P
1969–80	Toulouse Olympique	0	0	0	0	0
1980–82	Villeneuve Leopards	0	0	0	0	0
1982–84	Saint-Gaudens	0	0	0	0	0
	Total	0	0	0	0	0
Representative
Years	Team	Pld	T	G	FG	P
1971–82	France	25	0	0	0	0
- As of 23 Aug 2021
- Title: Chairman of Toulouse Olympique

Carlos Zalduendo (French: Charles Zalduendo) (born in Peralta, 17 August 1952) is a French former rugby league footballer and the chairman of the Toulouse Olympique club.

Between 2012 and 2016, he was president of the French Rugby League Federation.

He is also a former police inspector (later police officer, after the 1995 reform which made obsolete the dichotomy between plainclothes and uniformed agents).

== Biography ==
He was the youngest of a family with five sons. He arrived in France at the age of 5 years. His father was a bricklayer who settled in Artix, near Pau, while his mother settled in Saint-Jean-Pied-de-Port. During his childhood, he dominated three languages, Spanish, Basque and French. Wanting to become a curate, he attended the Gimont seminar from the seventh to the fourth year and then, the Christ Roi in Toulouse until the first year. Parallelly, he practiced many sports activities such as track and field, handball and rugby union, attending the Section Paloise's club. Scouted at the age of 16 by the Toulouse Olympique talent scout, he engaged himself and quickly demonstrated real attitude to play for Toulouse Olympique in First Division at the age of 17 and become a French international at age 17. As rugby league could not afford him a living, he parallelly sat and passed a police inspector competitive exam in Toulouse and occupied this activity between 1975 and 2007, appreciating the "feeling of usefulness" of said profession, attending the criminal justice, vice unit and liquor licence services. He allied for his entire rugby league player career with his police inspector work.

== Playing career ==
He played for Toulouse (1969–80), Villeneuve-sur-Lot (1980–82) and Saint-Gaudens (1982–84). During his playing career, he was selected 25 times to play for the France national team and beat Australia twice in 1978. He was twice French Champion with Toulouse in 1973 and 1975.

After his playing career, he became vice-president of the French Rugby League Federation between 1985 and 1994 and took the presidency of the Toulouse Olympique club in 1995 until 2012.

As chairman of Toulouse Olympique, he created the association "La Table Ovale" in 1995 by placing a partner network around Toulouse Olympique, to allow the club to join the Super League.

== Honours ==
- French Rugby League Championship
  - Champion of France in 1973 and 1975 (Toulouse)
  - Runner-up in 1981 (Villeneuve-sur-Lot)
  - Runner-up in 1976 (Toulouse)
