= Santisteban =

Santisteban is a Spanish-language surname. Notable people with the surname include:

- Anna Santisteban (1914–2003), Puerto Rican businesswoman
- Juan Santisteban (born 1936), Spanish footballer and manager
- Fernando Silva Santisteban (1929–2006), Peruvian historian, anthropologist, and academic

== See also ==
- Santisteban del Puerto, city in the province of Jaén, Spain
