= Carlos Mendes Varela =

Portuguese rugby league player (b.1984)

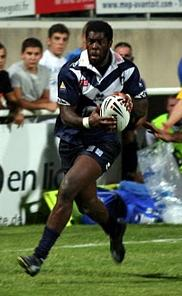

Personal information
- Born: 28 December 1984 (age 41) Seixal, Portugal
- Height: 1.88 m (6 ft 2 in)
- Weight: 100 kg (15 st 10 lb)

Playing information
- Position: Wing
Club
Years	Team	Pld	T	G	FG	P
2008–09	Lyon Villeurbanne	17	4	0	0	16
2009	Toulouse Olympique	4	2	0	0	8
	Total	21	6	0	0	24
- Source: As of 4 January 2010

Carlos Mendes Varela (born 28 December 1984) is a Portuguese-born French professional rugby league footballer. Arrived in France at 12, he took the French nationality and played in 2008 for the France A team (reserve of the national team). His position is winger or centre. He is currently playing for Toulouse Olympique in the Co-operative Championship competition in France and England. Prior to his signing with Toulouse he was playing at Lyon in the French first division.

== Background ==
Carlos Mendes Varela was born in Seixal, Portugal and is of Cape Verdean descent. He moved to France at the age of 12.
