= Jérôme Gout =

French rugby league player (b.1986)

Personal information
- Born: 13 May 1986 (age 40) France
- Height: 1.76 m (5 ft 9 in)
- Weight: 101 kg (15 st 13 lb)

Playing information
- Position: Prop
Club
Years	Team	Pld	T	G	FG	P
2007–13	Toulouse Olympique	18	2	0	0	4
- Source: As of 12 October 2023

Jérôme Gout is a French former professional rugby league footballer who played in the 2000s and 2010s. He played for the Toulouse Olympique in the RFL Championship, as a prop. He did not play any game during the first season of Toulouse in Championship in 2009 due to a knee injury. He was back in the playing squad for the 2010 season.
