= Falces =

Town in Navarre, Spain

Coordinates: 42°23′N 1°48′W

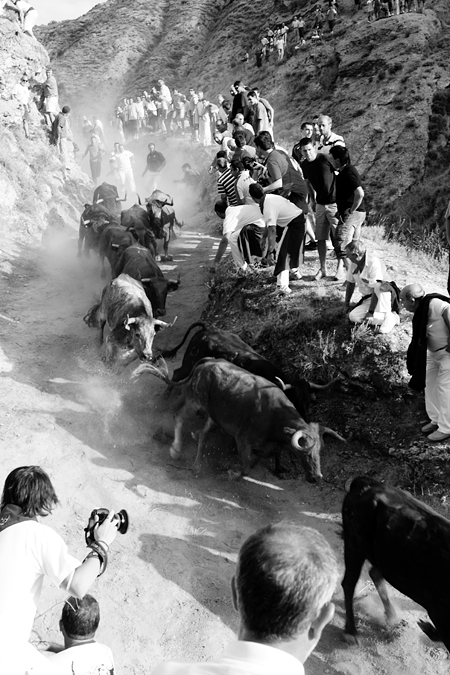
Running of the bulls in Falces (2009).

Falces is a town and municipality located in the province and autonomous community of Navarre, northern Spain. In Basque the town is called Faltzes. It has a population of around 2500 inhabitants. It is well known for the famous "encierro del pilon", which is a running of the bulls made even more dangerous due to it being run down a narrow road of a steep hill.

The composer Pedro Iturralde was born here.
