= Lerín =

Settlement in Navarre, Spain

Coordinates: 42°29′N 1°58′W

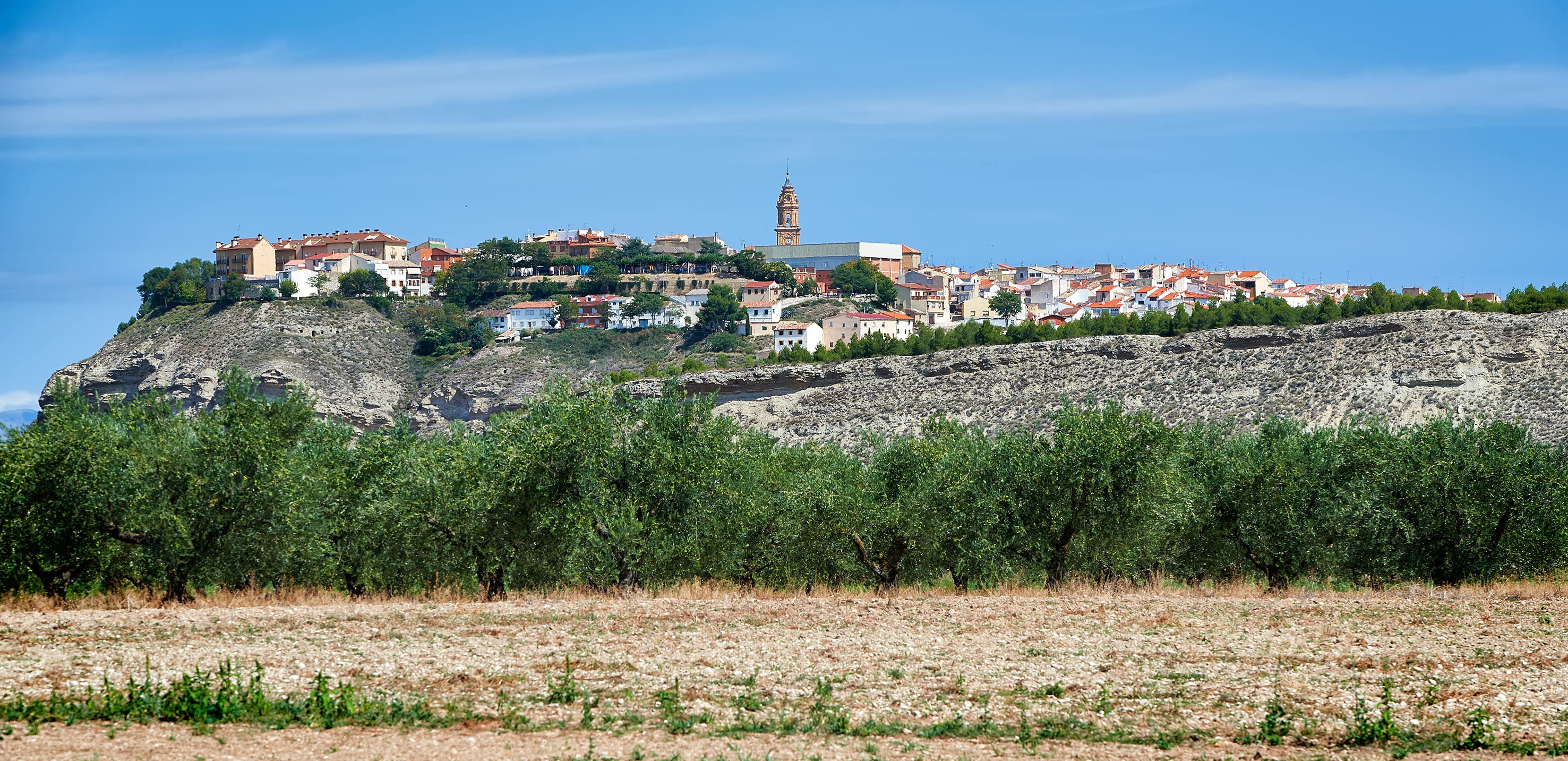
View of Lerín

Lerín is a town and municipality located in the province and autonomous community of Navarre, northern Spain.
