= Wynne =

Wynne is a surname of Welsh origin. This is a list of notable people with the surname, sorted by profession:

== Art, literature, and music ==
- Bill Wynne (1922–2021), American photographer and writer
- David Wynne (composer) (1900–1983), Welsh composer
- David Wynne (sculptor) (1926–2014), British sculptor
- Frank Wynne (born 1962), Irish translator and writer
- Ed Wynne (born 1961), British musician and son of sculptor David Wynne
- Ed Wynne (saxophonist), musician with the Doobie Brothers
- Gladys Wynne, Irish watercolour artist
- Giustiniana Wynne (1737–1791), Anglo-Venetian author, aka Countess Orsini-Rosenberg of Austria
- Madeline Yale Wynne (1847−1918), American artist, teacher, and philanthropist
- Michael Wynne (playwright), British playwright
- Nick Wynne (born 1943), American historian, educator, writer
- Philippé Wynne (1941–1984), American R&B vocalist
- Richard Wynne (c.1821–1895), Australian arts benefactor, established Wynne Prize
- Sina Wynne Holwerda (born 1997), American rapper known professionally as Wynne

== Athletes ==
- Ian Wynne (born 1973), British flatwater canoeist
- John Wynne (ice hockey) (born 1971), Canadian ice hockey defenceman
- Marvell Wynne (baseball player) (born 1959), American baseball outfielder
- Marvell Wynne (soccer) (born 1986), American football player
- Susan Wynne (fl. 1987–94), American figure skater

== Law, military, and politics ==
- Sir Arthur Singleton Wynne (1846–1936), British army general from Ireland
- Edward Wynne (chancellor) (1681–1755), Welsh lawyer and landowner
- Edward Wynne (colonial governor) (fl. 1621–26), early Newfoundland colonist, proprietary governor of the Ferryland colony from 1621 to 1626
- Edward Wynne (jurist) (1734–1784), English lawyer and scholar
- Edward Wynne-Pendarves (1775–1853), British politician
- Greville Wynne (1919–90), British spy
- Kathleen Wynne (born 1953), Canadian politician - Premier of Ontario
- Khalid Shameem Wynne (1953–2017), Pakistani four-star general and Chairman of the Joint Chiefs of Staff Committee
- Michael Wynne (born 1944), American businessman, Secretary of the United States Air Force (2005-2008)
- Robert Wynne (1851–1922), American politician
- Robert Wynne (Virginia politician) (1622–75), Virginia colonial politician, Speaker of the Virginia House of Burgesses
- William Watkin Edward Wynne (1801–1880), Welsh politician and antiquarian

== Other ==
- Angus G. Wynne (1914–1979), American businessman, founder of Six Flags theme parks
- Arthur Wynne (1862–1945), English-American inventor of the crossword puzzle
- Arthur Beavor Wynne (1837–1906), Irish geologist
- Billy Wynne (1919-2000), Church of Ireland cleric & founder of the Samaritans in Ireland
- Ellis Wynne (1671–1734), Welsh clergyman
- Emanuel Wynne (fl. c. 1700), French pirate
- Henry John Wynne (1864–1950), New Zealand engineer
- Ivor Wynne (1918–1970), Welsh-Canadian educator and university administrator
- Jane Wynne (1944–2009), English paediatrician
- Jay Wynne (1968–2025), British television & radio weather forecaster
- Lyman Wynne (1925–2007), American psychiatrist and psychologist
- Mary Lloyd Wynne (1813-1895), Welsh mycologist
- Owen Wynne (disambiguation), several people of this name
- Robert Wynne (1833-1912), Church of Ireland cleric and author

== See also ==
- Wynne (disambiguation)
- Wynn (disambiguation)
- Wyn, a surname
- Wyne (disambiguation)
