= PP-208 Khanewal-IV =

Constituency of the Punjabi Provincial Legislature, Pakistan

- Constituency for the Provincial Assembly of Punjab
- Region: Mian Channu Tehsil (partly) including Mian Channu city of Khanewal District

Current constituency
- Created from: PP-217 Khanewal-VI (2002-2018); PP-208 Khanewal-VI (2018-2023)

PP-208 Khanewal-IV (پی پی-208، خانیوال-4) is a Constituency of Provincial Assembly of Punjab.

== General elections 2024 ==
Provincial election 2024: PP-208 Khanewal-IV
Party	Candidate	Votes	%	±%
PML(N)	Babar Hussain Abid	48,539	37.28	
Independent	Muhammad Jamshaid Shoukat	46,311	35.57	
Independent	Sikandar Hayat Khan Bosan	10,577	8.12	
Independent	Muhammad Yousaf Khan (Note: Filed nomination papers as PTI candidate but ECP allowed him to run as an Independent)	7,085	5.44	
PPP	Shahid Bashir	6,555	5.03	
TLP	Usman Ali	4,791	3.68	
Others	Others (fourteen candidates)	6,354	4.88	
Turnout		133,675	53.84	
Total valid votes		130,212	97.41	
Rejected ballots		3,463	2.59	
Majority		2,228	1.71	
Registered electors		248,261		
hold				

== General elections 2018 ==
General Elections were held on 25 July 2018. Rana Babar Hussain won this seat with margin of 2,377 votes on PMLN ticket defeat PTI Muhammad Jamshaid Shoukat.

Provincial election 2018: PP-208 Khanewal-VI
Party	Candidate	Votes	%	±%
PML(N)	Babar Hussain Abid	55,067	46.46	
PTI	Muhammad Jamshaid Shoukat	52,690	44.46	
Independent	Muhammad Yousaf Khan	5,718	4.82	
TLP	Shabbir Anmad	3,251	2.74	
Others	Others (four candidates)	1,799	1.51	
Turnout		120,273	59.08	
Total valid votes		118,525	98.55	
Rejected ballots		1,748	1.45	
Majority		2,377	2.00	
Registered electors		203,576		

== By-election 2013 ==
General Elections were held on 11 May 2013 but Due to death of Candidate, Election in constancy PP-217 postponed & By Election held on 22 august 2013. Rana Babar Hussain won this seat with margin of 29,388 votes on PMLN ticket defeat PTI Maqsood Alam & PPP-P Ahmar Hussain Cheema.

By-election 2013: PP-217 Khanewal-VI
Party	Candidate	Votes	%	±%
PML(N)	Rana Babar Hussain	49,402	57.66	
PTI	Maqsood Alam	20,014	23.36	
PPP	Ahmar Hussain Cheema	13,905	16.23	
Others	Others (twenty candidates)	2,355	2.75	
Turnout		86,782	45.97	
Total valid votes		85,676	98.73	
Rejected ballots		1,106	1.27	
Majority		29,388	34.30	
Registered electors		188,776		

== General elections 2008 ==
General Elections were held on 18 February 2008. Rana Babar Hussain won this seat with margin of 8709 votes on PPP-P ticket defeat PMLQ Pir Zahoor Hussain Qureshi & PMLN Abdul Razziq Choudhary.

Contesting candidates	Party affiliation	Votes polled

== See also ==
- PP-207 Khanewal-III
- PP-209 Khanewal-V
