= Wynn (surname) =

Wynn is a surname of Welsh origin. Wynn and its variant Wynne are derived from the Welsh word for white (Gwyn). The name may sometimes be a form of Winn.

Notable people with the surname include:

== A ==
- Albert Wynn (born 1951), American politician
- Anthony Wynn (born 1962), American writer
- Arthur Wynn (1910–2001), British civil servant and Soviet spy
- Aubry Wynn, English footballer

== B ==
- Barry Wynn (born 1945), American businessman
- Benjamin Wynn, American composer, sound designer and producer
- Bert Wynn (1901–1966), English trade unionist
- Bessie Wynn (1876–1968), American actress and singer
- Big Jim Wynn (1912–1977), American saxophonist
- Bob Wynn (1940–2005), American professional golfer
- Brandon Wynn (born 1988), American artistic gymnast

== C ==
- Colt Wynn (born 1985), American professional bodybuilder

== D ==
- Dan Wynn (1920–1995), American photographer
- Danny Wynn (born 1983), American soccer player
- David Wynn (1972–2015), Canadian police constable
- DeShawn Wynn (born 1983), American gridiron football player
- DeWayne Wynn, American politician
- Dexter Wynn (born 1981), American football player
- Dick Wynn (1892–1919), English footballer
- Dylan Wynn (born 1993), American gridiron football player

== E ==
- Early Wynn (1920–1999), American baseball player
- Ed Wynn (1886–1966), American actor and comedian
- Edouard Wynn (fl. 1891–1904), English football pioneer
- Edward Wynn (1889–1956), Anglican bishop
- Elaine Wynn (1942–2025), American billionaire businesswoman and philanthropist
- Ellis Wynn, Sixteenth century English member of Parliament
- Emanuel Wynn, 17th-century French pirate
- Evan Wynn (born 1962), American politician

== F ==
- Frank B. Wynn (1859–1922), American psychiatrist and conservationist

== G ==
- Garrison W. Wynn (born 1961), American motivational speaker
- George Wynn (1886–1966), Welsh footballer
- Glyn Wynn, Welsh soldier and politician
- Glynn Wynn (1772–1809), English politician
- Graeme Wynn (born 1959), Australian rugby league footballer

== H ==
- Henri Wynn, English footballer
- Henry Wynn (1945–2024), British statistician
- Henry Wynn (politician) (1602–1671), Welsh politician
- Hugh Wynn (1897–1936), American film editor

== I ==
- Isaiah Wynn (born 1995), American football player

== J ==
- James Andrew Wynn (born 1954), American judge
- James Wynn (actor), British actor, author and film-maker
- Jarius Wynn (born 1986), American football player
- Jeffrey C. Wynn (born 2000), American geologist, geophysicist
- Jessica Keenan Wynn (born 1986), American actress
- Jimmy Wynn (1942–2020), American baseball player
- Jimmy Wynn (footballer) (1910–1986), English footballer
- Jody Wynn (born 1974), American basketball coach
- Jordan Wynn (born 1990), American football player and coach

== K ==
- Karen Wynn (born 1962), Canadian psychologist
- Keenan Wynn (1916–1986), American actor
- Kerry Wynn (born 1991), American football player
- Khari Wynn (born 1981), American guitarist

== L ==
- LaMetta Wynn (1933–2021), American politician

== M ==
- Malcolm Wynn (born 1948), English cricketer
- Mark Wynn (born 1963), British theologian
- Mary Wynn (1902–2001), American actress
- Maurice Wynn (died 1580), Welsh courtier and politician
- May Wynn (1928–2021), American dancer, actress
- Michael H. Wynn (born 1953), American podiatrist
- Milton Wynn (born 1978), American football player

== N ==
- Nan Wynn (1915–1971), American singer and actress
- Nathan Wynn (born 1986), Australian rugby league player
- Ned Wynn (1941–2020), American actor and screenwriter

== P ==
- Peter Wynn (born 1957), Australian rugby league footballer
- Peter Wynn (mathematician) (1931–2017), English mathematician
- Phail Wynn (c.1948–2018), American academic administrator

== R ==
- Renaldo Wynn (born 1974), American football player
- Richard Wynn (1656–1719) (1655–1719), English politician
- Robert Wynn (United States Army soldier) (1921–2000), American military personnel
- Robert Wynn (MP) (died 1598), Welsh member of parliament
- Ron Wynn, American music critic
- Ron Wynn (footballer) (1923–1983), Welsh footballer

== S ==
- Samuel Wynn (1891–1982), Australian Jewish community leader, restaurateur, merchant and Zionist
- Shane Wynn (born 1992), American football player
- Spergon Wynn (born 1978), American gridiron football player
- Steve Wynn (musician) (born 1960), American musician
- Steve Wynn (born 1942), American casino mogul and art collector

== T ==
- Terry Wynn (born 1946), British politician
- Thomas A. Wynn, American immunologist
- Thomas G. Wynn (born 1949), American archaeologist
- Tim Wynn (born 1970), American film composer
- Timothy Wynn (born 1985), Australian rugby league footballer
- Toby Wynn (born 1975), American women's college basketball coach
- Tracy Keenan Wynn (born 1945), American screenwriter

== V ==
- Valree Fletcher Wynn (1922–2021), American academic

== W ==
- Will Wynn (American football) (1949–2013), American football player
- Will Wynn (born 1961), American businessman and politician
- William H. Wynn (1932–2002), American labor leader
- William J. Wynn (1860–1935), American politician
- William Wynn (poet) (1709–1760), Welsh poet
- William Wynn (footballer) (1876–1944), Welsh footballer
- Willie Wynn (1917–1992), American baseball player

== See also ==
- Wynn (disambiguation)
- Wynn (given name)
- The Wynn baronets, baronetcies of the County of Carnarvon
