= Wyne =

Wyne may refer to:

== People ==
=== Surname ===
- Ehsan Wyne (born 1938), Pakistani lawyer and political figure
- Ghulam Haider Wyne (1940–1993), Pakistani politician and Chief Minister of Punjab
- Wyne Lay (born 1994), Burmese singer-songwriter and model
- Begum Majeeda Wyne, Pakistani politician, wife of Ghulam Haider Wyne
- Zaneta Wyne (born 1990), American soccer player

=== Other ===
- Wyne Su Khine Thein (born 1986), Burmese singer and actress
- Wyne (film director), Burmese filmmaker Tun Zaw Win (born 1973)

== Radio stations ==
- WYNE-LP, a low-power radio station (95.9 FM) licensed to serve Wayne, New Jersey, United States
- WZTE, a radio station (1530 AM) licensed to serve North East, Pennsylvania, United States, which held the call sign WYNE from 2004 to 2013
- WHBY, a radio station (1150 AM) licensed to serve Kimberly, Wisconsin, United States, which held the call sign WYNE until 1992

== Other uses ==
- Wyna (river), a river in Switzerland also known as the Wyne
- Wyne (tribe), a Jat Muslim tribe of Pakistan

== See also ==
- Wyn, a surname
- Wynne (disambiguation)
- Wine (disambiguation)
