= Win =

Win or WIN most likely refers to:

- A victory

Win, Winning, WIN or Winner may also refer to:

== Arts and entertainment ==
=== Film ===
- Win!, a 2016 American film

=== Literature ===
- Win (novel), 2021 novel by Harlan Coben
- WIN (pacifist magazine)
- WIN (wrestling magazine), US

=== Music ===
- Win (band), a Scottish band
- "Win" (song), by Jay Rock
- "Win", a song by Ateez from the album Treasure EP.Fin: All to Action
- "Win", a song by Brian McKnight from the album Gold
- "Win", a song by David Bowie from the album Young Americans
- "Win", a song by Stefflon Don and DJ Khaled from the mixtape Secure
- Worldwide Independent Network (WIN), a coalition of independent music bodies, see Independent record label#Worldwide Independent Network (WIN))

=== Television and radio ===
- Win Radio, a Philippine radio network
  - 91.5 Win Radio, its flagship station
- Win FM, an Indian radio station
- WIN Television, an Australian television network
  - WIN Corporation, the owner of WIN Television
  - WIN News, the news service for WIN Television
  - WIN (TV station)

== People ==
- Win (Burmese diplomat)

=== Surnamed Win ===
- Win Aung, multiple people
- Aye Aye Win (born 1953), Burmese journalist
- Everjoice Win (born 1965), Zimbabwean feminist activist
- Ne Win (1910–2002), Burmese military commander
- Soe Win (disambiguation), multiple people
- Nyan Win (born 1953), foreign minister of Myanmar since 2004
- Win Zaw (born 1982), Burmese politician currently serving as a House of Nationalities MP
- Win Myint (born 1951), president of Myanmar from 2018 to 2021

=== Given or nickname Win ===
- Win Butler (born 1980), American-Canadian musician
- Win Elliot (1915–1998), American sportscaster and game show host
- Win Gatchalian (born 1974), Filipino politician
- Win Headley (born 1949), American football player
- Win Lyovarin (born 1956), Thai writer
- Win Mercer (1894–1902), American baseball pitcher
- Win Rockefeller (1948–2006), American politician, farmer, and businessman
- Win Rosenfeld (born 1978), American screenwriter and producer
- Win (born 1999), stage name of Thai actor Win Metawin

== Science and technology ==
- Microsoft Windows, computer operating systems
- Win4Lin, software
- Wireless Intelligent Network

== Sport ==
- Win (baseball), a statistical credit given to a pitcher
- Win (horse), a racehorse

== Transportation ==
- Winchester railway station, England, code
- Windsor railway station, Melbourne
- Winona (Amtrak station)Winona, Minnesota, US, code
- Winton Airport in Queensland, Australia, IATA code

== Other uses ==
- We Invest in Nationhood, Guyanese political party
- Win, a type of bet offered by UK bookmakers
- WIN, chemical compounds (like WIN 55,212-2) by Sterling Drug
- WIN Party, a small New Zealand political party, 2004–2006
- WIN/GIA (or WIN/Gallup International), the Worldwide Independent Network/Gallup International Association, of market research firms, 2010–2017
- "Whip inflation now", a mid-1970s American economic plan
- Wolność i Niezawisłość ("Freedom and Independence Association"), Poland, 1945–1952

== See also ==
- WINS (disambiguation)
- Winn (disambiguation)
- Winner (disambiguation)
- Winning (disambiguation)
- Wyn, a surname
- Wynn (disambiguation)
