= Rana Babar Hussain Abid =

Pakistani politician

Member of the Provincial Assembly of the Punjab
- Incumbent
- Assumed office 24 February 2024
- Constituency: PP-208 Khanewal-VI
- In office August 2013 – 31 May 2018
- Constituency: PP-217 (Khanewal-VI)
- In office 9 April 2008 – December 2012
- Constituency: PP-217 (Khanewal-VI)
- In office 15 August 2018 – 14 January 2023
- Constituency: PP-208 Khanewal-VI

Personal details
- Born: 18 August 1973 (age 53) Khanewal, Punjab, Pakistan
- Party: PMLN (2008-present)

Rana Babar Hussain Abid is a Pakistani politician who has been a member of the Provincial Assembly of the Punjab from PP-208 Mian Channu from February 2024 till date. Previously, he was a Member of the Provincial Assembly of the Punjab from April 2008 to December 2012 and again from August 2013 to May 2018, and again from August 2018 to January 2023.

== Early life and education ==
He was born on 18 August 1973 in Mian Channu.

He received a degree of Bachelor of Commerce from Hailey College of Commerce and a degree of Master of Business Administration which he received in 1996 from Philippine School of Business Administration.

== Political career ==
He was elected to the Provincial Assembly of the Punjab as a candidate of the Pakistan Peoples Party (PPP) from Constituency PP-217 (Khanewal-VI) in the 2008 Pakistani general election. He received 39,938 votes and defeated Zahoor Hussain Qureshi.

In December 2012, he quit the PPP and joined the Pakistan Muslim League (N) (PML-N). He also resigned from his Punjab Assembly seat.

In 2013, he was allocated a PML-N ticket to contest the 2013 general election from Constituency NA-217 (Khanewal-VI). However, the election in the constituency was postponed after the death of a candidate.

He was re-elected to the Provincial Assembly of the Punjab as a candidate of PML-N from Constituency PP-217 (Khanewal-VI) in by-polls held in August 2013.

He was re-elected to the Provincial Assembly of the Punjab as a candidate of PML-N from Constituency PP-208 (Khanewal-VI) in the 2018 Pakistani general election.
