= Winner =

Winner(s) or The Winner(s) may refer to:

- Champion, the victor in a game or contest
- The successful social class in winner and loser culture

== Film ==
- The Winner (1926 film), an American silent film starring Billy Sullivan
- The Winner (1962 film), a French film by François Reichenbach
- The Winners (1973 film) or My Way, a South African film
- The Winner (1995 film), a Chinese film by Huo Jianqi
- The Winner (1996 film), an American comedy by Alex Cox
- Winner (2003 film), an Indian Tamil film starring Prashanth
- The Winner (2011 film), an American-Polish co-production by Wiesław Saniewski
- The Winner (2014 film), a Hungarian film by Dávid Géczy
- The Winner (2016 film), a Nepalese action film
- Winner (2017 film), an Indian Telugu film
- Winners (2022 film), a British Persian-language drama film
- Winner (2024 film), an American-Canadian black comedy film
- Winners (2024 film), a German film

== Television ==
- Winners (1977 TV series), a 1977 American series
- Winners (American TV series), a 1991 American series
- Winners (Australian TV series), a 1985 anthology series
- The Winner (TV series), a 2007 American comedy series
- The Winners (Australian TV series), two Australian rules football highlight shows
- The Winners (Canadian TV series), a Canadian biographical miniseries
- "Winner" (Better Call Saul), the final episode of the fourth season of Better Call Saul
- "Winner" (Not Going Out), a 2009 episode
- "The Winner", an episode of The Brady Bunch
- "The Winner", an episode of Welcome to Paradox
- Winner, a character from the fifth season of Battle for Dream Island, an animated web series

== Literature ==
- The Winner (novel), a novel by David Baldacci
- Winners (collection), a collection of short stories by Poul Anderson
- The Winners (novel) (Los premios), a novel by Julio Cortázar
- Winner (newspaper), a sports newspaper in Australia between 1914 and 1917

== Music ==
- The Winner Records, a UK record label
- Winner (band), a K-pop boy band formed in 2013

=== Albums ===
- Winner (Renée Geyer album) (1978)
- Winner (Big Boss Man album), a 2005 album by Big Boss Man
- Winners (Brothers Johnson album) (1981)
- Winners (Kleeer album) (1979)
- The Winner (album), a 2010 album by Michael Trent

=== Songs ===
- "Winner" (Conan Gray song)
- "Winner" (Jamie Foxx song)
- "Winner" (Kid British song)
- "Winner" (Pet Shop Boys song)
- "Winner" (Rythem song)
- "Winner" (Systems in Blue song)
- "Winners" (song), by Mohombi
- "Winner", by Karina Pasian from First Love
- "The Winner", by Badfinger (written by Joey Molland) from Ass
- "The Winner", by Badfinger (written by Joe Tansin) from Airwaves
- "Winner", by Haley Blais from Wisecrack
- "The Winner", by Bobby Bare
- "Winner", by Chris Brown from Chris Brown
- "The Winner", by Coolio from the Space Jam film soundtrack
- "The Winner", by The Crystal Method from Tweekend
- "Winner", by Kerser from A Gift & a Kers
- "Winners", by Arthur Prysock (written by Joe Raposo) for the film Maurie, later covered by Frank Sinatra on Ol’ Blue Eyes Is Back
- "The Winner", by Status Quo from Quid Pro Quo
- "Winner", by Stephanie Mills from Stephanie

== Places ==
- Winner, Minnesota, an abandoned townsite
- Winner, Missouri, an unincorporated community
- Winner, South Dakota, a city

== Other uses ==
- Winner (card game), a shedding card game
- Winner (surname), a family name
- Winners, a Canadian retail chain
- Ligat Winner, an Israeli basketball league
- Imidacloprid or Winner, an insecticide
- Barry Horowitz or The Winner, professional wrestler
- Winner (tennis), a forcing shot

== See also ==
- Win (disambiguation)
- Winning (disambiguation)
