= Wyne (surname) =

Tribe in Pakistan

Wyne or Wynne (Punjabi: وائیں) is a tribal surname in Punjab, Pakistan, associated with the Kashmiris.

== Notable people ==
- Begum Majeeda Wyne (fl. 2013 – 2018) Pakistani politician and former member of National Assembly of Pakistan
- Ghulam Haider Wyne former Chief Minister of Punjab, Pakistan from 1990 to 1993
- General Khalid Shameem Wynne, Pakistan Armed Forces
- Ehsan Wyne, a politician from Punjab, Pakistan
