= Wyness =

Wyness is a Scottish surname, a patronymic form of the surname Winn. Notable people with the surname include:

- Dennis Wyness (born 1977), Scottish footballer
- Keith Wyness (born 1958), Scottish businessman and football executive
