= Wynne (disambiguation) =

Wynne is a surname of Welsh origin

Wynne may also refer to:

- Wynne (given name)
- Wynne Prize, an Australian art prize
- Wynne, Arkansas, a city in the USA
- Wynne High School, Arkansas
- Wyne (tribe), Pakistani clan, also spelled Wynne
- Wynee, the first Native Hawaiian from the Hawaiian Islands to traveled abroad

== See also ==
- Wynn (disambiguation)
- Wyne (disambiguation)
