= General Wynne =

General Wynne may refer to:

- Arthur Wynne (British Army officer) (1846–1936), British Army general
- Khalid Shameem Wynne (1953–2017), Pakistan Army four-star general
- Owen Wynne (British Army officer) (1665–1737), British Army lieutenant general

== See also ==
- David W. Winn (1923–2009), U.S. Air Force brigadier general
- Richard Winn (1750–1818), South Carolina Militia general
