= Wijn =

Wijn or de Wijn is a Dutch surname. Notable people with the surname include:

- Astrid de Wijn, Dutch physicist
- Elsje de Wijn (1944–2026), Dutch actress
- Jan Wijn (1934–2022), Dutch pianist
- Joop Wijn (born 1969), Dutch politician
- Piet Wijn (1929–2010), Dutch comics creator
- Sander de Wijn (born 1990), Dutch field hockey player

== See also ==
- Wyn
