= Wynne (given name) =

The given name Wynne may refer to:

- Wynne (rapper) (Sina Wynne Holwerda; born 1997), American rapper
- Wynne Arboleda (born 1976), Filipino basketball player
- Wynne Bradburn (1938–2008), New Zealand cricketer
- Wynne Chin (born c. 1960), American professor of management information systems
- Wynne Crompton (1907–1988), Welsh footballer
- Wynne Edwin Baxter (1844–1920), English lawyer, translator, antiquarian and botanist
- Wynne Ellis (1790–1875), wealthy British haberdasher, politician and art collector
- Wynne Evans (born 1972), Welsh singer and actor
- Wynne F. Clouse (1883–1944), U.S. Representative from Tennessee
- Wynne Gibson (short for "Winifred"; 1898–1987), American actress
- Wynne Godley (1926–2010), British economist and critic of the British government
- Wynne Greenwood (born 1977), American queer feminist performance artist
- Wynne Grey Rogers (1874–1946), Justice of the Louisiana Supreme Court
- Wynne Melville Jones (born 1947), Welsh artist
- Wynne Neilly (born 1989/90), Canadian photographer
- Wynne Paris (born 1964−2021), American new-age and worldbeat musician
- Wynne Prakusya (born 1981), Indonesian tennis player
- Wynne Pyle (1881–1971), American concert pianist
- Wynne Samuel (1911–1989), Welsh politician

== See also ==
- Wynne (surname)
