= Muhammad Azmat Ullah Shah =

- محمد عظمت اللہ شاہ
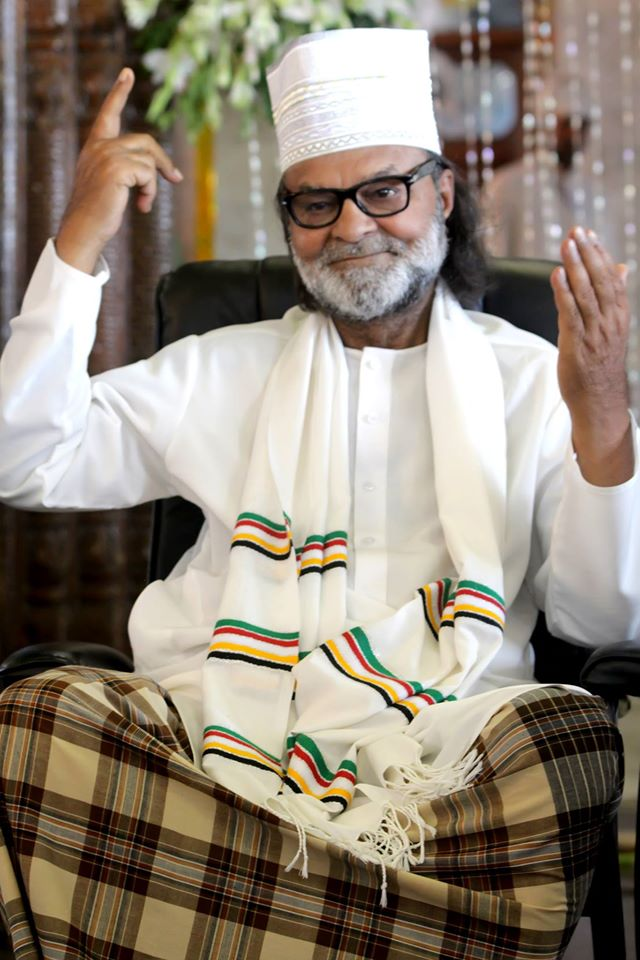
- Born: Muhammad Azmat-Ullah-Shah; November 1, 1945; Battal, Khyber Pakhtunkhwa, Pakistan
- Died: September 25, 2016 (aged 70); Cardiff, South Wales, United Kingdom
- Resting place: Naqeebabad Shareef, Kasur, Pakistan
- Organization: Pakistan Army
- Known for: Promoting discipline, love, peace, and tolerance in accordance to Quran & Sunnah
- Children: 8

Khawaja Sufi Muhammad Azmat Ullah Shah (November 1, 1945 – September 25, 2016) was a renowned Sufi spiritual leader and a retired Lieutenant Colonel of the Pakistan Armed Forces. He was the son and mureed (follower) of the eminent Khawaja Faqeer Sufi Muhammad Naqeeb Ullah Shah, and later became the leader of the Naqeebi spiritual chain, Silsila Aliya Naqeebiya. He practised and taught Islam through the simplest, yet most practical ways and was known for his unrivalled promotion of discipline, love and peace, through enlightening individuals to find and realise their true selves. He regularly emphasised that those who could not love, respect and thank other fellow human beings could not love, respect and thank Allah.

== Early life ==
Khawaja Sufi Muhammad Azmat Ullah Shah was born on 1 November 1945. He passed matriculation from Quetta board of Secondary Education in 1962 followed by successful completion of Intermediate education (Higher Secondary Education) from Islamia College Kasur.

He received education in sharia and enlightenment under the supervision of his Shaikh and late father, the grand sheikh of Naqeebia Spiritual chain.

While his father was his Pir o Murshed, his mother was a Sufiah, she made great sacrifices and guided her kids as per Sunnah.

== Pakistan Army ==
Khawaja Sufi Muhammad Azmat Ullah Shah joined the Pakistan Army in 1962. After the successful completion of his professional training in the Military Academy, he served in the Pakistan Army, Frontier Forces.

During his service he earned the rank of Lieutenant Colonel, having fought in the Soviet–Afghan War.

In 1994, his shaikh nominated him as his successor and following his Shaikh's passing, he became the custodian of his Shrine and Astana at "Naqeeb Abad Sharif" in Kasur, Pakistan. After his retirement from Pakistan Army in 1994, he served masses through education of peace, tolerance and discipline as 1st Custodian/ Sajada and leader of Silsila Aliya Naqeebia.

== Religious career ==
Shah was an esteemed spiritual leader with millions of followers worldwide, and the leader of the Naqeebi spiritual chain. He was Sajjada Nashin (custodian and trustee) of Astana Aliya Naqeebia, Naqeebabad Sharif near Kasur, Pakistan by 2005. In 2012, he announced his support for Imran Khan.

His life was about reaching out to people and helping them understand the meaning of this life and the hereafter. He offered a philosophy of love, peace and discipline. His followers remember him with love and respect. He taught his followers to be focused. He said that people should act with focus and passion while remembering Allah with each breath.

Azmat ul Auliya explained Deen Islam simply and clearly.

His followers tell about his spiritual connection with his followers. They speak of him guiding them spiritually to attain peace, connect with soul, and about the meaning of this life and the hereafter.

Every Dargah/ Shrine serves food to the masses. At Astana Aliya Naqeebia, Muhammad Azmat Ullah Shah made this a religious duty for his chain. Langer (food) served at this shrine of Naqeebia Chain is called Shahi Langer which means food of highest quality fit for kings. Langer at Astana Aliya Naqeebia is available in huge quantities. Each week has a menu that includes vegetables, pulses, rice, meat, curry, tea, milk, sweets, sharbats and pickles.

In 2004 he visited Wales where he was honored at Cardiff City Hall. He was a member of Nazaria-i-Pakistan Trust.

== Spiritual gatherings ==
Silsila Aliya Naqeebia creates year round spiritual gatherings. This chain has no day without spiritual gathering. People from across Pakistan come to Astana e Aliya Naqeebia, Naqeebabad Sharif Kasur, Pakistan on the 27th night of each lunar month. This is called Sattaisvien Sharif, which means blessed 27th of each month. Followers recite Darood o Salam, Hamd o Naat, Quran o Hadees and then Zikr o Khatam Sharif. Every Sataisvien Sharif Mehfil e Sama (sufi music and poetry) makes followers cry and tremble with fear of Allah. Many attendees Mehfil e Sama lose themselves in the music and poetry, while crying and reciting Kalma Tayaba they do Raqs (whirling Dervishes). They explain this Kaifiyat/Condition as "connecting with soul and celestial energy and losing themselves in that moment of Tuabah (asking forgiveness ), realization of true self, letting go of all worldly thoughts, worries and status".

== Legacy ==
Azmat ul Auliya died in Britain on September 26, 2016, of kidney disease. He was buried at Astana-e-Aliya Naqeeb Abad, Kasur. His funeral service was attended by many people, including Raja Pervaiz Ashraf and Rana Muhammad Iqbal Khan. He is buried next to his father.

Naqeeb e Sani and Azmat e Sani succeeded him.
