= Emmanuel Nicholas =

Sri Lankan Tamil

Emmanuel Nicholas is a Sri Lankan Tamil, who was born in Sri Lanka on 2 January 1939.

Nicholas, a De La Salle Christian Brother, was 27 when he left Sri Lanka for Pakistan, to teach mathematics and science at La Salle High School Multan. He taught there until 1968. His students included Yousuf Raza Gillani who become prime minister of Pakistan in March 2008.

As a De La Salle Brother, he considers his mission in life is to educate the poor in the slums and rural outbacks. When St. Vincent's school, in Mian Channu on the Multan-Lahore road, wanted a principal in 1968, Nicholas volunteered for the job. Mian Channu was a Christian village of about 600 families and the school was built for their children.

Nicholas also considered former President Zia ul-Haq to be a close friend.

He also attended Fordham University in New York City, where he earned a master's degree in counseling.

In 1979, he left Pakistan to return to his native Sri Lanka. The President of Pakistan conferred the civil award of Tamgha-e-Imtiaz (Medal of Pakistan) on Bro. Emmanuel in recognition of his outstanding and meritorious services for the education sector in Pakistan. He received the award at the High Commission of Pakistan, Colombo, on 23 March 2012.

Back in Sri Lanka, he is working to improve the quality of life in a shantytown on the outskirts of Colombo, particularly to reduce maternal and infant deaths. The De La Salle Brothers care for 450 children from ages 3 to 5 in preschool programs, 135 young women in training for jobs like sewing and catering, and 175 young men learning trades like agriculture and auto mechanics. Raising funds to carry out these programs is not easy. They get little financial help from the government, but people in business and international foundations do support . He needs $8,000 each month to continue his work.
