= Thomas Wynn =

Thomas Wynn may refer to:

- Thomas Wynn, 1st Baron Newborough (1736–1807), British politician
- Thomas Wynn, 2nd Baron Newborough (1802–1832), British peer
- Thomas A. Wynn, immunologist
- Thomas G. Wynn, cognitive archaeologist
- Sir Thomas Wynn, 1st Baronet, Welsh politician
