= Wynn (given name) =

Wynn is a given name and nickname. People with the first name Wynn include:

- Wynn Bruce (1971–2022), American climate activist who self-immolated
- Wynn Bullock (1902–1975), American photographer
- Wynn Chamberlain (1927–2014), American artist, filmmaker and author
- Wynn Edwards (1842–1900), American farmer and politician
- Wynn Everett (born 1978), American actress
- Wynn Handman (born 1922), American theatre director
- Wynn Harmon (born 1960) American stage and screen actor
- Wynn Hawkins (born 1936), American baseball player and executive
- Wynn Mercere, American fantasy author
- Wynn Normington Hugh-Jones (born 1923), British diplomat and politician
- Wynn Roberts (actor), Australian television actor
- Wynn Roberts (biathlete) (born 1988), American athlete
- Wynn Schwartz (born 1950), American psychologist
- Wynn Speece (1917–2007), American radio personality
- Wynn Stewart (1934–1985), American country music singer-songwriter and guitarist
- Wynn Underwood (1927–2005), American attorney and politician
- Wynn Varble, contemporary American country music performer and songwriter

== See also ==
- Wynn (surname)
- Wynn (disambiguation)
- Win (disambiguation)
