= NA-146 Khanewal-III =

Constituency of the National Assembly of Pakistan

- Constituency for the National Assembly of Pakistan
- Region: Mian Channu Tehsil of Khanewal District
- Electorate: 519,486

Current constituency
- Party: PTI
- Member: Zahoor Hussain Qureshi
- Created from: NA-158 Khanewal-III (2002-2018) NA-152 Khanewal-III (2018-2023)

NA-146 Khanewal-III (این اے-146، خانیوال-۳) is a constituency for the National Assembly of Pakistan. Constituency old Numbers NA-152 (2018-2023) & NA-158 (2002-2018).

== Election 2002 ==
General elections were held on 10 October 2002 in NA-158. Pir Muhammad Aslam Bodla of PPP won by 73,481 votes.

General election 2002: NA-158 Khanewal-III
Party	Candidate	Votes	%	±%
PPP	Aslam Bodla	73,481	48.97	
PML(Q)	Syed Fakhar Imam	56,462	37.63	
PML(N)	Farhat Ullah Khan	18,094	12.06	
Others	Others (three candidates)	2,027	1.34	
Turnout		153,248	52.78	
Total valid votes		150,064	97.92	
Rejected ballots		3,184	2.08	
Majority		17,019	11.34	
Registered electors		290,329		

== Election 2008 ==
General elections were held on 18 February 2008 in NA-158. Pir Muhammad Aslam Bodla of PML-Q won by 57,777 votes.

General election 2008: NA-158 Khanewal-III
Party	Candidate	Votes	%	±%
PML(Q)	Aslam Bodla	57,777	37.13	
PPP	Pir Haider Zaman Qureshi	56,821	36.52	
PML(N)	Farhat Ullah Khan	39,357	25.29	
Others	Others (two candidates)	1,649	1.06	
Turnout		159,741	60.84	
Total valid votes		155,604	97.41	
Rejected ballots		4,137	2.59	
Majority		956	0.61	
Registered electors		363,562		
PML(Q) gain from PPP				

== Election 2013 ==
General elections were held on 11 May 2013 in NA-158. Pir Muhammad Aslam Bodla of PML-N won by 94,050 votes and became the member of National Assembly.

General election 2013: NA-158 Khanewal-III
Party	Candidate	Votes	%	±%
PML(N)	Aslam Bodla	94,050	46.74	
PTI	Zahoor Hussain Qureshi	72,126	35.84	
PPP	Pir Haider Zaman Qureshi	28,237	14.03	
Others	Others (twelve candidates)	6,821	3.39	
Turnout		205,962	63.65	
Total valid votes		201,234	97.70	
Rejected ballots		4,728	2.30	
Majority		21,924	10.90	
Registered electors		323,568		
PML(N) gain from PML(Q)				

== Election 2018 ==
General elections were held on 25 July 2018.

General election 2018: NA-152 Khanewal-III
Party	Candidate	Votes	%	±%
PTI	Zahoor Hussain Qureshi	109,257	47.08	
PML(N)	Aslam Bodla	99,137	42.72	
PPP	Haider Zamman Qureshi	12,027	5.18	
TLP	Muhammad Shafiq Ur Rehman	8,412	3.63	
Independent	Muhammad Ashraf	1,855	0.80	
MMA	Ghulam Haider	1,358	0.59	
Turnout		236,412	58.92	
Total valid votes		232,046	98.15	
Rejected ballots		4,366	1.85	
Majority		10,120	4.36	
Registered electors		401,227		

== Election 2024 ==
General elections were held on 8 February 2024. Zahoor Hussain Qureshi won the election with 112,777 votes.

General election 2024: NA-146 Khanewal-III
Party	Candidate	Votes	%	±%
PTI	Zahoor Hussain Qureshi (Note: Filed nomination Pao as PTI candidate but ECP allowed him to run as an independent)	112,777	41.28	
PML(N)	Aslam Bodla	104,875	38.39	▼4.33
Independent	Muhammad Imran Shah	15,437	5.65	▼41.43
TLP	Hafiz Muhammad Imran Siddiq	12,863	4.71	▲1.08
PPP	Shahid Bashir	12,004	4.39	▼0.79
Others	Others (fifteen candidates)	15,251	5.58	
Turnout		280,076	53.91	▼5.01
Total valid votes		273,207	97.55	
Rejected ballots		6,869	2.45	
Majority		7,902	2.89	
Registered electors		519,486		

== See also ==
- NA-145 Khanewal-II
- NA-147 Khanewal-IV
