= Wyn (disambiguation) =

Wyn is a Welsh surname and given name.

Wyn or WYN can also refer to:

- Wyn (letter), letter of the Old English alphabet
- Wyandot language, Iroquoian language
- Wyndham Airport, airport near Wyndham, Western Australia, Australia
