= William Wynn =

William, Will, Willie, or Bill Wynn or Wynne may refer to:

== Law and politics ==
- William Wynne (lawyer) (c. 1692–1765), Welsh lawyer and historian
- William Wynne (judge) (1729–1815), English judge and academic
- William Wynne (Irish politician) (c 1764–1855), Irish politician, MP for Sligo Borough
- William Watkin Edward Wynne (1801–1880), Welsh politician, MP for Merionethshire
- William J. Wynn (1860–1935), US Representative from California
- W. R. M. Wynne (William Robert Maurice Wynne, died 1909), Welsh politician, MP for Merionethshire
- Will Wynn (born 1961), American politician in Austin, Texas

== Sports ==
- Bill Wynne (1869–1951), American baseball pitcher
- William Wynn (footballer) (1876–1944), Welsh international footballer
- Willie Wynn (1917–1992), American baseball player
- Will Wynn (American football) (born 1949), American football defensive end
- William Wynne (hurdler) (born 1990), American hurdler

== Others ==
- William Wynne (historian) (c. 1671–1704), Welsh priest and historian
- William Wynn (poet) (c. 1709–1760), Welsh priest and poet
- Bill Wynne (1922–2021), American dog trainer and photojournalist
- William H. Wynn (1932–2002), American trade unionist

== Other uses ==
- Williams-Wynn baronets, English baronetcy

== See also ==
- Billy Wynne (disambiguation)
- William Winn (1945–2006), American educational psychologist
