= Naqeebabad Sharif =

Naqeeb Abad Sharif نقیب آباد شریف Dargah Naqeeb Ul Auwliya (درگاہ نقیب الاولیاء)
- Naqeeb Abad Sharif
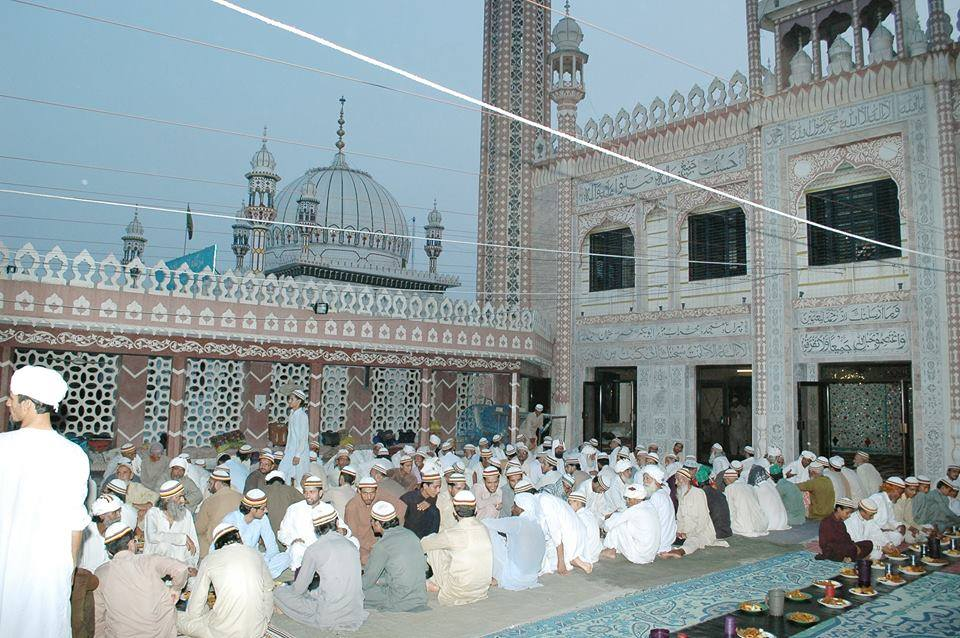

- Location within Punjab, Pakistan Location within Pakistan
- Coordinates: 31°10′7″N 74°26′53″E

Naqeebabad Sharif (Urdu: نقیب آبادشریف) or Astana-e-Aliya Naqeeb Abad Sharif (also referred to as Dargah Naqeeb ul Auliya) is an Islamic Spiritual site located at Lahore-Kasur Highway. The dargah site is famous for being the center of the famous spiritual sufi chain "Naqeebia".

The tombs of Faqeer Sufi Muhammad Naqeeb Ullah Shah and Sufi Muhammad Azmat Ullah Shah are located at Naqeebabad Sharif. The tombs are visited daily by local and foreign visitors. The tombs are constantly surrounded by much recitation of the Qur'an & Zikr (mention of God) by both visitors and locals. In 2016, after the passage of Sufi Muhammad Azmat Ullah Shah, he was buried there, next to the tomb of his father Faqeer Sufi Muhammad Naqeeb Ullah Shah.

The site is also renowned for its Islamic architecture and the Sunheri Naqeebia Mosque, reflecting the Sufi principle that daily prayers are central to spiritual practice in Islam. Constructed by Sufi Naqeeb Ullah Shah, elder son Sufi Qudratullah Shah, and younger son Sufi Habibullah Shah—while son retired Lt. Col. Muhammad Azmat Ullah Shah served in the Pakistan Army until prior to Babajee's passing—the mosque stands as a prestigious representation of Islamic architecture, offering visitors an esteemed view.

Following his retirement from the Pakistan Army, Ret. Col. Azmatullah Shah used his influence to assume control of the dargah, sidelining other sons and daughters of Babajee Hazrat Naqeebullah Shah. Backed by groups of murids (followers) and local administration, he consolidated ownership of the astana and its arrangements by manipulating ownership records and titles. He projected himself as the sufi of the astana and removed other sons and heirs from operations following Babajee Hazrat Sufi Naqeebullah Shah's passing in 1995.

After Sufi Azmatullah Shah's death in 2016, his two sons, Naqeebur Rahman and Asadullah, took over administration and control. Other grandsons—including Sufi Amar, Sufi Taher, and Sufi Naseer (sons of elder son Sufi Qudratullah Shah, of Babajee Sufi Naqeebullah Shah); Sufi Obaidullah Shah and Sufi Mazharullah Shah (sons of the Babajee’s younger son sufi Habibullah Shah); and Sufi Namatullah Shah and Sufi Inayetullah Shah (sons of Babajee’s daughter Rahila Bibi, who spent her life serving Babajee)—reportedly faced threats and accusations of being labeled "murtad" to facilitate the acquisition of darbar assets and property. Having previously faced intimidation from the Colonel and his followers, these family members now operate under the threat and influence of Naqeebur Rahman and Asadullah, with local authorities allegedly under the influence or control of the two brothers.

Various religious, spiritual and cultural events are held at the Darga Naqeeb ul auwaliya throughout the year. In these events, participants and artists from different parts of world came to the shrine to present their tribute to their sheikh by reciting Quran, Naats, Nasheeds and Qawwali. Jashan-e-Naqeebi (Annual Urs Celebration of Faqeer Sufi Naqeeb Ullah Shah), Jashan-e-Azmat ul Auwaliya (Annual Urs Celebration of Azmat ullah Shah), Jashan Jahangeeri are the most awaited and honorific events that held at Naqeeb Abad Sharif.

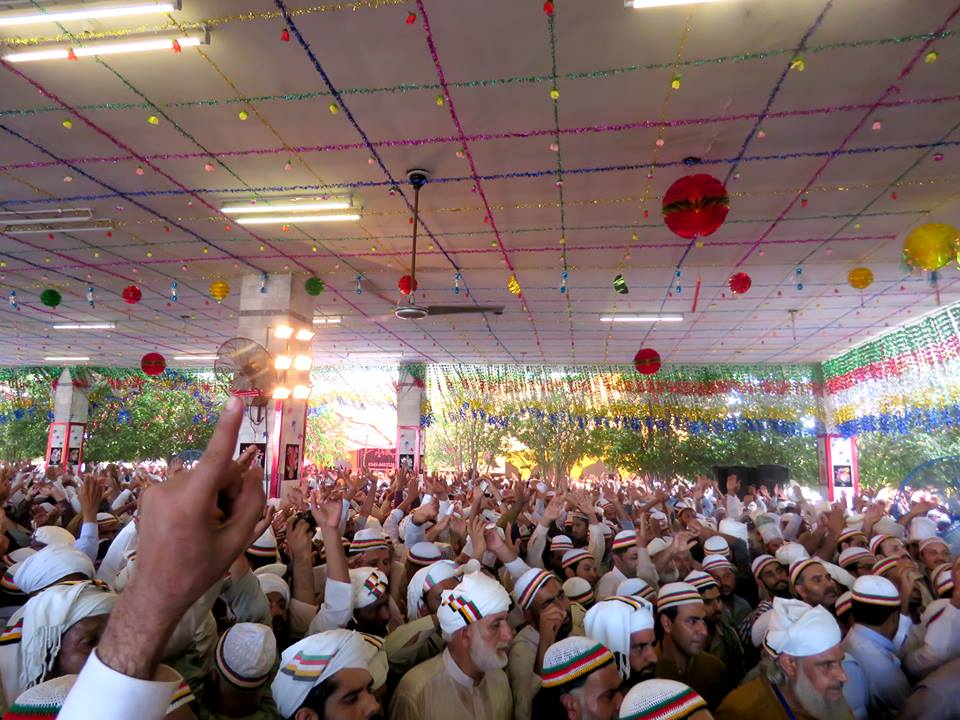
Jashan-e-Naqeebi 2016
