= Wynns =

Wynns or Wynn's can refer to:

== Businesses ==
- Wynn's, subsidiary of Illinois Tool Works
- Wynns (wine), Australian winery

== People ==
- Austin Wynns (born 1990), American baseball player
- Jill Wynns, American politician
- Mahala Wynns (born 1948), Turks and Caicos Islands politician
- Thomas Wynns (1764–1825), American politician

== See also ==
- Wynn (disambiguation)
