= WYNN =

WYNN may refer to:

- WYNN (AM), a radio station (540 AM) licensed to Florence, South Carolina, United States
- WYNN-FM, a radio station (106.3 FM) licensed to Florence, South Carolina, United States
- NASDAQ symbol for Wynn Resorts

== See also ==
- Wynn (disambiguation)
