= La Salle Higher Secondary School, Multan =

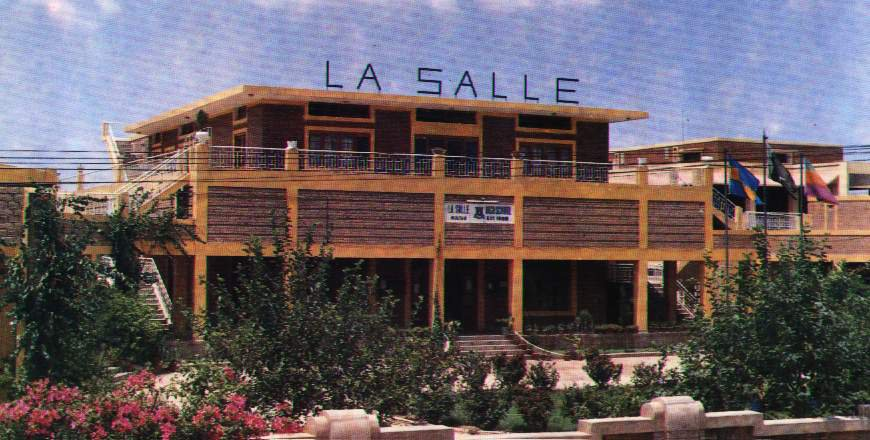
- La Salle Higher Secondary School, Multan in 1980

Location
- Chungi No. 9, Bosan Road; Multan, Punjab; Pakistan
- Coordinates: 30°12′38″N 71°28′13″E

Information
- Type: Private higher secondary school
- Religious affiliation: Roman Catholic
- Denomination: Christian Brothers
- Established: 1960; 66 years ago
- Founder: Bishop F.B Cialeo, OP
- Local authority: Catholic Board of Education, Multan
- Administration: Catholic Board of Education
- Principal: Bro. Qamar iqbal, FSC (2024 - onwards)
- Affiliations: Roman Catholic Diocese of Multan
- Website: www.lasalle.edu.pk

The La Salle Higher Secondary School, Multan is a private, Catholic higher secondary school run by the Institute of the Brothers of the Christian Schools in Multan, Punjab, Pakistan. It was founded by Bishop F.B Cialeo, OP in 1960.

== History ==
In the 1940s Bishop F.B Cialeo, OP, first Bishop of Multan requested the La Salle Brothers to run this school in Multan.

The La Salle High School Multan is one of the missionary institutions that were initiated by St. John Baptist De La Salle (the founder of the La Sallian community).

Rev. Bro. Lawrence Manuel, FSC was the longest serving principal of La Salle Higher Secondary School, Multan, i.e. from 1986 to 2007. The current principal is Bro. Shahzad George Gill, FSC.

The principal of the school said that Christian educational institutions have contributed a lot in nurturing the country's leadership. He was responding to Punjab Chief Minister Shahbaz Sharif's 9 June 2008 promise to make Punjab a 100 percent literate province by 2010.

The school's most prominent alumnus is Yousaf Raza Gilani, ex-prime minister of Pakistan. Brother Emmanuel Nicholas who taught Gilani in the 1960s, was reunited with his student during a South Asian Association for Regional Cooperation meeting in Colombo in March 2008. In 2011, he recommended to the President of Pakistan that Bro. Emmanuel be given the Tamgha-i-Pakistan (Medal of Pakistan) for services he had rendered towards the uplift of the poor in Pakistan. The medal was awarded to him on 23 March 2012, at the Pakistan High Commission in Colombo.

== Other branches ==
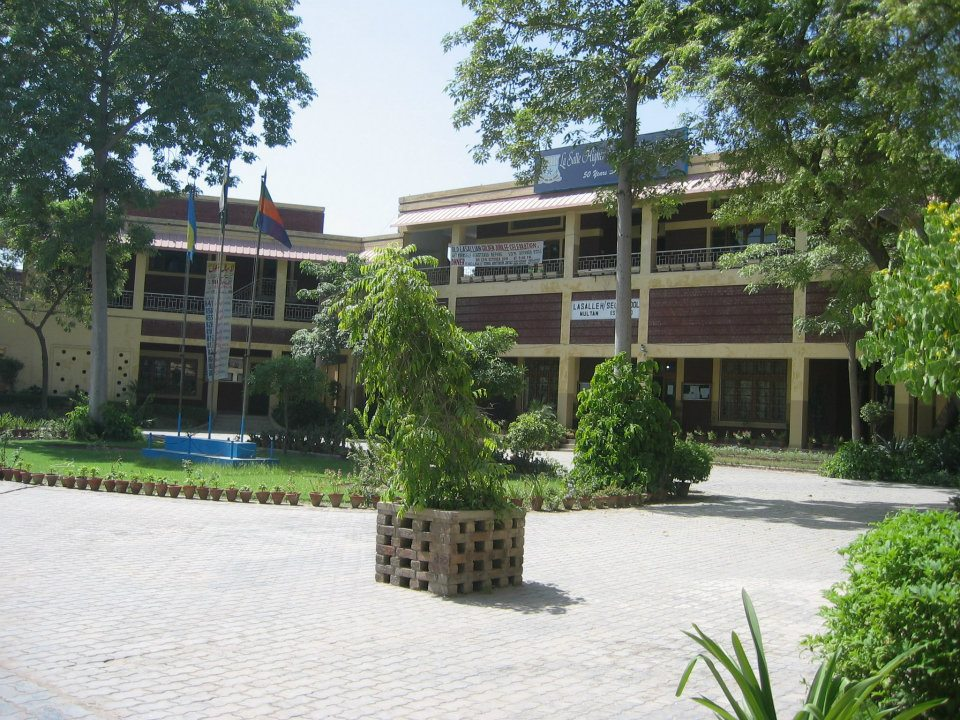
La Salle Higher Secondary School, Multan in 2012

The other branches of the school in Pakistan are as follows:

=== Multan ===
- La Salle Higher Secondary School, Chungi No. 9, Bosan Road, Multan
- Hostel (Oliver Hall)
- Alban Girls High School Multan
- Youth Centre
- La Salle colony, Behind Rasheedbad Multan

=== Faisalabad ===
- La Salle High School, People's Colony 1, Faisalabad
- La Salle Urdu School
- Benildus Boys Hostel
- La Salle Middle School Sant Singh Wala
- La Salle School Gokhowal
- St Catherine's Primary
- La Salle Railway Colony

=== Karachi ===
- Don Bosco Home for Boys, c/o St. Patrick's Cathedral, Shahrah-e-Iraq, Karachi - 74400

=== Khushpur ===
- La Salle House, Chak 51 G.B., Khushpur, District Faisalabad
- Catechist Training Centre
- Catholic Hostel for Boys
- La Salle High School
- Benildus Literacy Centre

=== Sindh ===
- Marie Adelaide Rehabilitation Centre, Umeed Goth, Sinjhoro 68220, Dist. Sanghar, Sindh

== House system ==
There is a three-house system in the school. All houses participate in the activities and competitions of the school. Students are sorted into the houses by dividing roll/admission numbers with 3. The application of this house system can be seen particularly on the Sports Day.

- Jinnah House (Green)
- Iqbal House (Red)
- Liaquat House (Blue)

== Principals ==
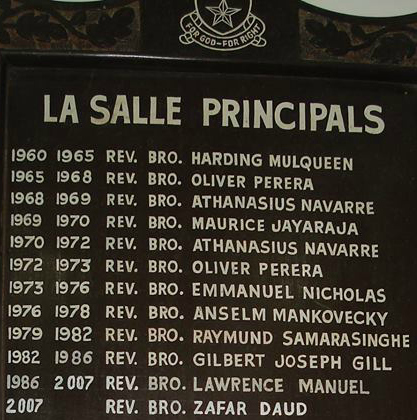
Names & Tenure of Principals in La Salle Higher Secondary School, Multan

The following individuals have served as principal of La Salle Higher Secondary School, Multan:

Ordinal	Officeholder	Term start	Term end	Time in office	Notes
1	Rev. Bro. Harding Mulqueen	1960	1965	4–5 years	
2	Rev. Bro. Oliver Perera	1965	1968	2–3 years	
3	Rev. Bro. Athanasius Navarre	1968	1969	0–1 years	
4	Rev. Bro. Maurice Jayaraja	1969	1970	0–1 years	
−	Rev. Bro. Athanasius Navarre	1970	1972	1–2 years	
−	Rev. Bro. Oliver Perera	1972	1973	0–1 years	
5	Rev. Bro. Emmanuel Nicholas	1973	1976	2–3 years	
6	Rev. Bro. Anselm Mankovecky	1976	1978	1–2 years	
7	Rev. Bro. Raymund Samarasinghe	1979	1982	2–3 years	
8	Rev. Bro. Gilbert Joseph Gill	1982	1986	3–4 years	
9	Rev. Bro. Lawrence Manuel	1986	2007	20–21 years	
10	Rev. Zafar Doud	2007	2017	9–10 years	
11	Rev. Br. Shahzad George Gill, FSC	2017	incumbent	8–9 years	

== Co-curricular ==
- Athletics
- Sports including cricket, BasketBall, Table Tennis, Badminton, Football.
- Board Games (includes Chess)
- Dance
- Handwriting
- Movie Club
- Music (includes Singing)
- Nature Watch
- Poetry
- Science Club
- Art
- Bazm-e-Adab
- Chess Society
- Computer Society
- Debating Society (English)
- Debating Society (Urdu)
- Dramatics Club (English)
- Dramatics Club (Urdu)
- History
- Islamic Society
- Literary
- Mathematics
- Quiz
- Science Society

== Notable alumni ==
- Yousaf Raza Gilani, Prime Minister of Pakistan from 2008 to 2012
- Ashiq Hussain Qureshi, Pakistani first-class cricketer
