= 2022 India–Pakistan missile incident =

Accidental firing of a missile

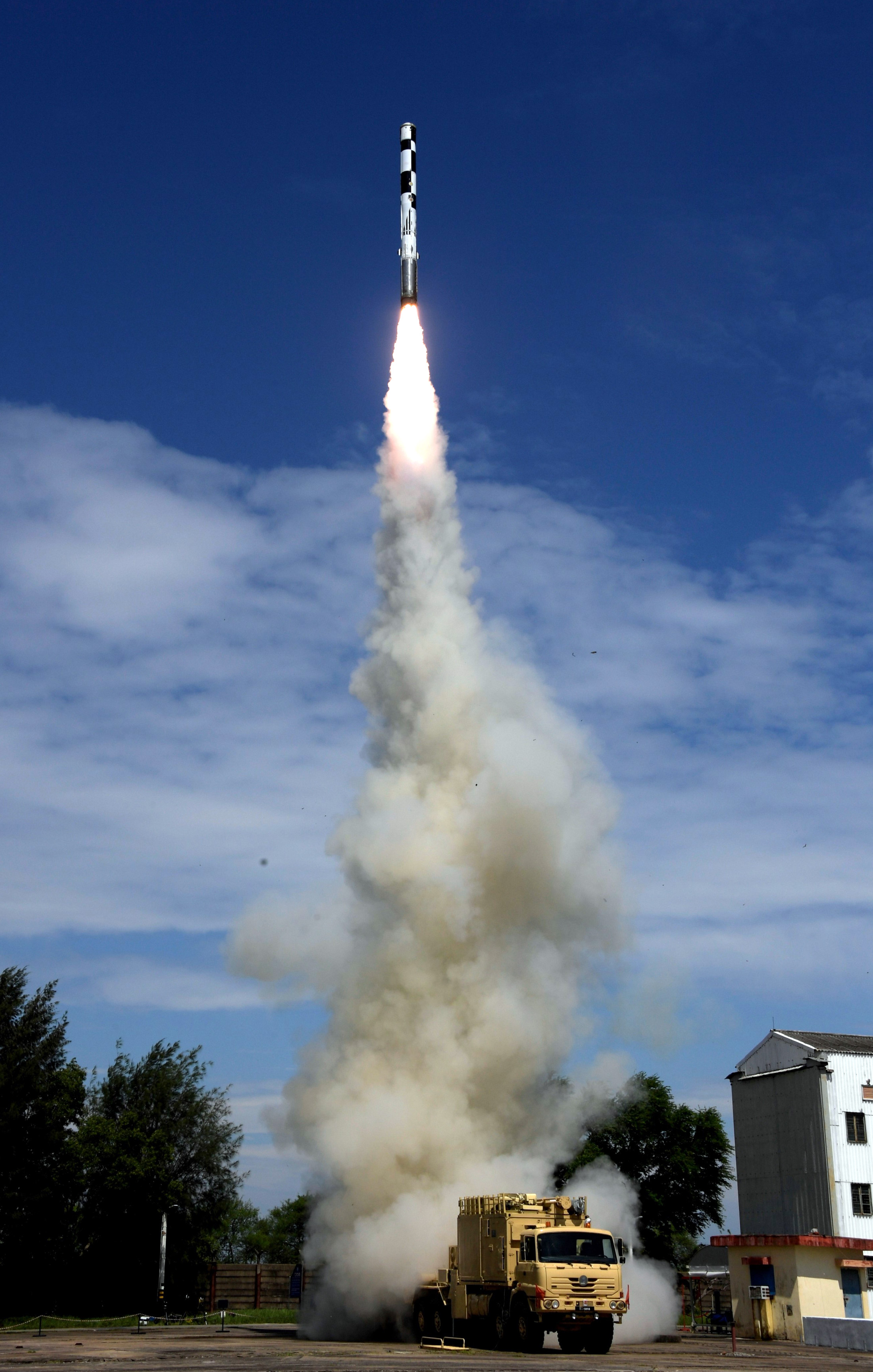
- A BrahMos missile similar to the one involved in the incident.
- Date: 9 March 2022 (4 years ago)
- Cause: Claimed by India to be the result of a malfunction
- Participants: India; Pakistan
- Outcome: Pakistan publicly condemns India

On 9 March 2022, India accidentally fired a BrahMos missile originating from Ambala, Haryana that crashed into Mian Channu, Khanewal District, Punjab, Pakistan.

== Incident ==
On 9 March 2022, at 6:43 pm, Air Defence Operations Center of the Pakistan Air Force (PAF) picked up a high-speed flying object inside Indian territory. "From its initial course, the object suddenly maneuvered towards Pakistani territory and violated Pakistan's air space, ultimately falling near Mian Channu at 6:50 pm", according to Director General Maj Gen Babar Iftikhar of the Inter-Services Public Relations (ISPR).

The crash near Mian Channu, Khanewal District, in Punjab, Pakistan, caused damage to civilian property but no casualties. The missile travelled 124 kilometers inside Pakistani territory in three minutes and 44 seconds, according to Air Vice Marshall Tariq Zia of PAF. Pakistan Air Force identified the missile's point of origin near Ambala, Haryana and it crossed into Pakistan from Suratgarh, Rajasthan.

Earlier media reports suggested that an aircraft had crashed in the area.

== Reaction ==
=== Pakistan ===
Pakistan strongly condemned the incident and the military spokesperson said that Pakistan Air Force had "initiated requisite tactical actions" in response as it tracked the missile from its point of origin in India to its point of impact. Warning India against recurrence of such incident in the future, it demanded the Indians explain what caused the accident. The military spokesperson added that the accidental firing of the missile "reflects very poorly on their [the Indians'] technological prowess and procedural efficiency". Pakistan also lamented the threat the missile incident had posed to the safety of many international and domestic passenger flights.

On 11 March 2022, the Foreign Office of Pakistan summoned the Indian envoy to register Pakistan's protest over the unprovoked airspace violation by an Indian origin "super-sonic flying object", saying such "irresponsible incidents" reflected India's "disregard for air safety and callousness towards regional peace and stability".

On 12 March 2022, the Foreign Office of Pakistan issued a statement demanding "a joint probe to accurately establish the facts surrounding the incident" while rejecting New Delhi's decision to hold an internal inquiry.

=== India ===
In a delayed admission of the accidental missile launch 48 hours after the incident, the Indian Defense Ministry said on 11 March 2022 that "a technical malfunction led to the accidental firing of a missile" and that it was "deeply regrettable". India also said that they have ordered a high-level Court of Enquiry to look into the incident. While still unconfirmed by both the Indian and Pakistani authorities, sources said that the missile that was accidentally fired was a BrahMos. Times of India claimed that conventional missiles like the BrahMos also don't have "self-destruct mechanisms" like the ones supposedly available on India's strategic or nuclear missiles. However, such assertions came from the media and not the Indian authorities.

On 23 August 2022, 3 Indian Air Force officers were primarily held responsible for the incident for "deviation from the Standard Operating Procedures" and their services were terminated by the Indian government with immediate effect.

The Pakistani Ministry of Foreign Affairs later issued a statement rejecting the Indian investigations. Stating that "systemic loopholes and technical lapses of serious nature in handling of strategic weapons cannot be covered up beneath the veneer of individual human error", Pakistan maintained its demand for a joint investigation of the incident in the spirit of transparency.

=== China ===
China's Foreign Ministry spokesman Zhao Lijian called for "a thorough investigation" into the incident while urging India and Pakistan to "strengthen information sharing" and establishing "a notification mechanism in time to avoid the recurrence of such incidents and to prevent miscalculation".

=== United States ===
US State Department Spokesperson Ned Price while responding to a question about the incident, said that "we have no indication" that India's missile launch into Pakistan was "anything other than an accident".

== See also ==
- Pokhran missile incident
