= Pokhran missile incident =

- Time: 25 March 2023
- Location: Jaisalmer district
- Type: Misfiring of missiles

On 25 March 2023, the Indian Army misfired three surface-to-air missiles during an exercise in the Pokhran ranges in the western Jaisalmer district of Rajasthan, India. The missiles were misfired due to a technical glitch following which an investigation was initiated into the incident. One of the missiles fell in Ajaysar Village, Ajmer; however, there was no loss of life or property.

== See also ==
- 2022 India–Pakistan missile incident
