= WINS =

WINS may refer to:

- Windows Internet Name Service
- Wireless integrated network sensors
- WINS, off-course betting facilities operated by Japan Racing Association
- WINS (AM), an all-news radio station in New York City
- WINS-FM, a radio station in New York City
- WINS (solution stack), a set of software subsystems
- Women in Natural Sciences, an educational program in the UD
- World Institute for Nuclear Security
- SM&A, stock ticker symbol WINS

== See also ==
- Win (disambiguation)
- WINZ (disambiguation)
