= Mian Channu =

City in Pakistan

Mian Channu مياں چنوں
- City
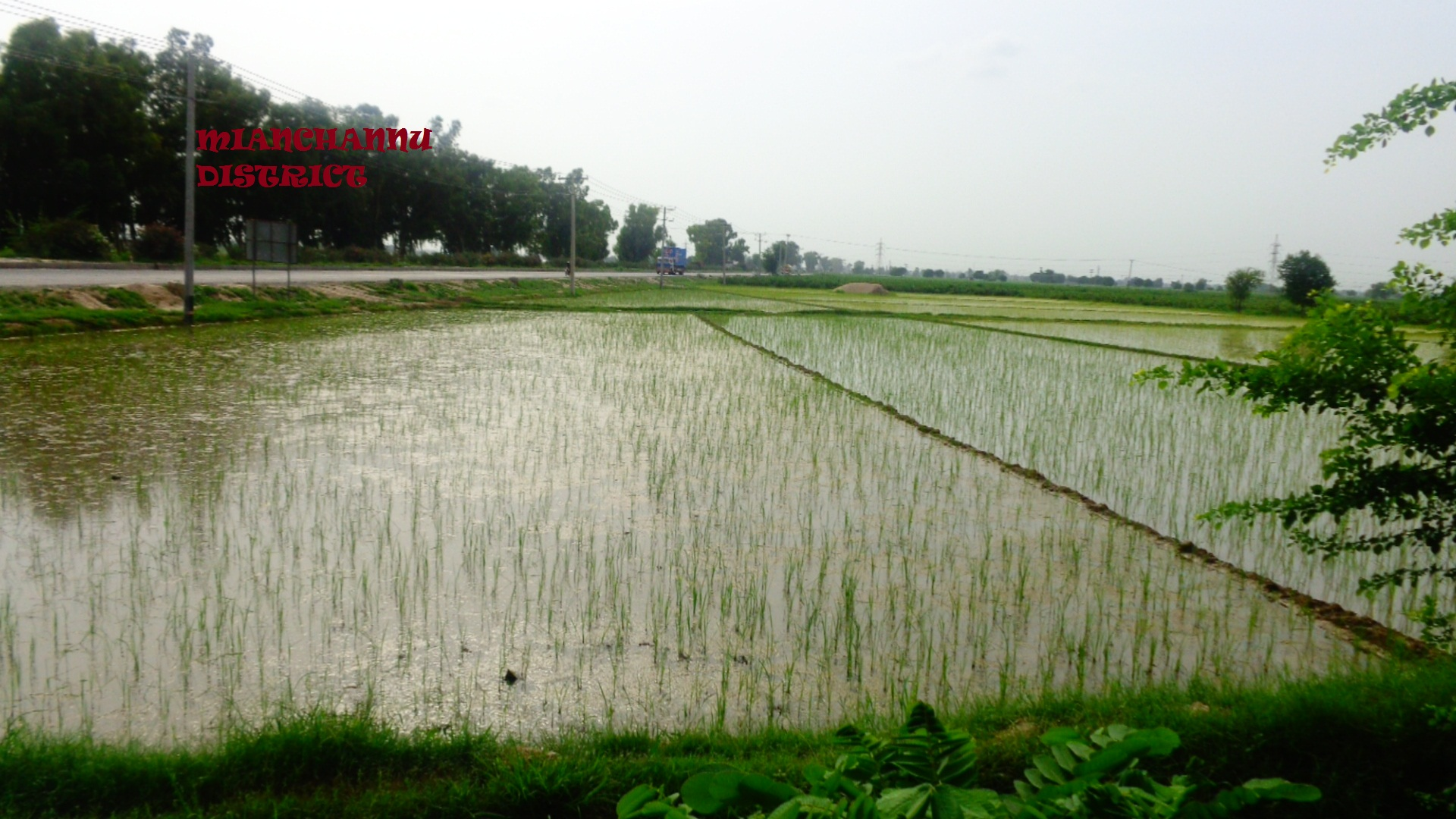
- Rice fields in Mian Channu

- Location within Punjab, Pakistan Location within Pakistan
- Coordinates: 30.27°N 72.22°E
- Country: Pakistan
- Province: Punjab
- District: Khanewal

Government
  - Type: Municipal Committee
  - Chief Officer: Mr. Rehman Latif
  - Assistant Commissioner: Ishfaq Ahmed

Population (2023 census)
  - City: 140,112
  - Rank: 84th in Pakistan
- Time zone: UTC+5 (PST)

Mian Channu (Note: Alternative spelled as Mian Chunnun; Punjabi pronunciation: [ˈmiːjä̃ː t͡ʃɐ̃nˈnũː], Urdu pronunciation: [ˈmɪjɑ̃ː t͡ʃʊ̃nˈnũː]) (Urdu / Punjabi: مِياں چَنُّوں), is the capital city of Mian Channu Tehsil in Khanewal District, Punjab province of Pakistan.

== Etymology ==
The city was named after a Sufi saint, Baba Mian Channu, who lived in the area and was buried there.

An urban legend exists about the name's preservation during British rule: the colonial administration attempted to rename the city, painting all signs with the new name. However, an unknown vandal repeatedly changed the signs back to "Mian Channu." Despite continued efforts by the administration, the original name remained.

Mian Channu provides various services and residential areas for its inhabitants, as well as facilities for tourists.

== History ==
Mian Channu was part of the wider Multan region after the Islamic conquest of Punjab region in the 8th century CE by the Umayyads. Mian Channu was considered a village, and by 1938, it was considered a town of Multan region. Its limits were last extended in the year 1950. Since then, no extension has been made, and the development of the town from 1947 to 1961 remained slow. A municipal council was established in 1975, as Mian Channu had grown into small urban centre by that time. After that, the town began developing, and major growth has been taking place, from 1972 to 1984. The trend of growth in this period has largely been along G.T Road, and in the northern direction.

It has been the headquarters of the Mian Channu Tehsil of Khanewal District since 1985, and is administratively subdivided into three Union councils.

For more than a century, Mian Channu was part of Multan District. With the raising of status of Mian Channu to a tehsil headquarters, and the creation of Khanewal District on 1 July 1985, Mian Channu Tehsil became a part of Khanewal District.

An accidentally fired BrahMos missile from India that landed in Mian Channu in 2022, is referred to as the 2022 India–Pakistan missile incident.

== Demographics ==
Population

Historical population
Year	Pop.	±% p.a.
1951	12,071	—
1961	19,888	+5.12%
1972	31,935	+4.40%
1981	40,609	+2.71%
1998	64,859	+2.79%
2017	90,157	+1.75%
2023	140,112	+7.62%

According to 2023 census, Mian Channu had a population of 140,112. Mian Channu has approximately 90,130 residents per the 2017 census, and is located on the Grand Trunk Road (250 km southwest of Lahore, and 1,050 km northeast of Karachi), and the KLP (Karachi, Lahore, Peshawar) railway line.

- Faisal Town, residential area

Languages

Languages of Mian Channu MC (2023 Census)
1. Punjabi (91.5%)
2. Urdu (6.60%)
3. Pashto (0.60%)
4. Others (1.30%)

== omy ==
The city is one of the major contributor to agricultural production. Cotton, wheat, and mangoes are the major agricultural products. Major crops of the town are wheat, grain, peas, barley are the important crops of Rabi season, while Kharif crops are cotton, sugarcane, jawar, bajra, oil seeds which are shipped by rail and road to other parts of the country.

The city is also known for their local specialty, Khushi Barfi (خوشی کی برفی), which is a milk-based sweet with a fudge-like consistency.

== Notable people ==
- Ghulam Haider Wyne - Pakistani Politician (Former Chief Minister Punjab)
- Arshad Nadeem - Olympic Gold Medalist Athlete (Javelin thrower)
- Maulana Tariq Jameel - Pakistani Islamic television preacher, scholar.
- Iftikhar Thakur - Pakistani actor and stand-up comedian.
- Pir Muhammad Aslam Bodla - Pakistani Politician
- Rana Babar Hussain - Pakistani Politician
- Begum Majeeda Wyne - Pakistani Politician
- Rana Usman Ali Babar - Pakistani-American
- Humza Yousaf - former First Minister of Scotland and Leader of the Scottish National Party (SNP)
