= Winning =

Winning may refer to:

- Victory

== Film ==
- Winning (film), a 1969 movie starring Paul Newman
- Winning: The Racing Life of Paul Newman, a 2015 documentary by Adam Carolla and Nate Adams

== Music ==
- Winning (band), a Bangladeshi rock band
- Winning, an album by Ten Foot Pole, 2022

=== Songs ===
- "Winning" (song), by Russ Ballard, 1976; covered by Santana, 1981
- "Winnin'", by Chief Keef from Back from the Dead, 2012
- "Winning", by Chris Rea from Wired to the Moon, 1984
- "Winning", by Ciara featuring Big Freedia from CiCi, 2023
- "Winnin", by City Girls from City on Lock, 2020
- "Winning", by Emily Haines and the Soft Skeleton from Knives Don't Have Your Back, 2006
- "Winning", by Gentle Giant from The Missing Piece
- "Winning (A song by Charlie Sheen)", by the Gregory Brothers

== Other uses ==
- Winning (book), a 2005 management book by Jack Welch
- Winning Appliances, an Australian retailer

== People with surname ==
- Charles Winning (1889–1967), Australian cricketer
- David Winning (born 1961), Canadian and American film director, producer, screenwriter
- Thomas Winning (1925–2001), Scottish Roman Catholic cardinal

== See also ==
- Charlie Sheen, who used the word as a catchphrase
- Win (disambiguation)
- Winner (disambiguation)
