= Ashiq Hussain Qureshi =

Pakistani first-class cricketer (1949–2019)

Nawab Ashiq Hussain Qureshi
- عاشق حسین قریشی
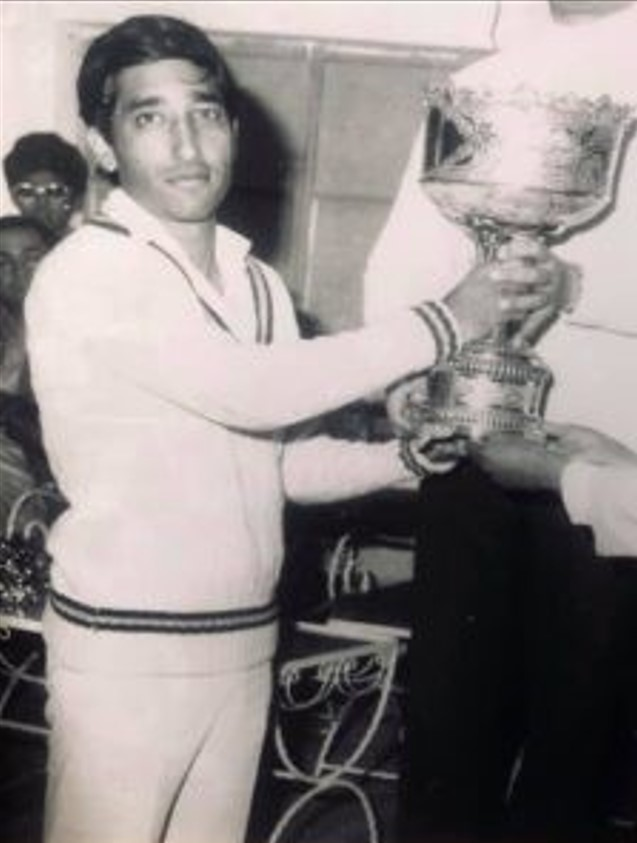
- Qureshi after winning a trophy, 1969

Founder and Chief Executive Officer Pakistan Veterans Cricket Association
- In office 22 September 2006 – 31 October 2019

Personal details
- Born: 28 November 1949 Multan, Pakistan
- Died: 31 October 2019 (aged 69) Lahore, Pakistan
- Resting place: Premises of Shrine of Bahauddin Zakariya
- Children: 4
- Parent: Sadiq Hussain Qureshi (father)
- Relatives: Liaqat Hayat Khan (maternal grandfather); Sajjad Hussain Qureshi (paternal uncle); Mansoor Ali Khan Pataudi (maternal cousin); Iftikhar Ali Khan Pataudi (maternal uncle); Shah Mahmood Qureshi (cousin); Aamir Hussain Qureshi (cousin); Zain Qureshi (nephew); Zahoor Hussain Qureshi (nephew)
- Education: La Salle Higher Secondary School, Multan; Aitchison College; Pakistan Military Academy
- Known for: First to support Imran Khan in building SKMCH; Founder of Sports for Life; Co-Founder and Board Member of Shaukat Khanum Memorial Cancer Hospital; Co-Founder of Pakistan Tehreek-e-Insaf; Co-Founder of Namal Institute
- Awards: Chevalier de l'Ordre national du Mérite (2018)

Military service
- Branch/service: Pakistan Army
- Years of service: 1971–1972
- Rank: Captain
- Unit: 5th Horse (Probyn's Horse)
- Battles/wars: Indo-Pakistani War of 1971
- Cricket career

Cricket information

Domestic team information
- Years: Team
- 1984: Pakistan Railways

Career statistics
Competition	FC
Matches	1
Runs scored	5
Batting average	–
100s/50s	0/0
Top score	5*
Balls bowled	84
Wickets	1
Bowling average	40.00
5 wickets in innings	0
10 wickets in match	0
Best bowling	1/27
Catches/stumpings	0/–
- Source: CricketArchive, 26 January 2024

Ashiq Hussain Qureshi (Note: Urdu: عاشق حسین قریشی) (28 November 1949 – 31 October 2019) was a Pakistani aristocrat, military officer, first-class cricketer and administrator, philanthropist, and Pir.

Born to Sadiq Hussain Qureshi, a former Governor and Chief Minister of Punjab, Qureshi was educated at Aitchison College, where he was a classmate and teammate of Imran Khan on the under-19 cricket team.

He later enrolled into the Pakistan Military Academy and was commissioned into the Pakistan Army as an armoured corps officer in 1971. He resigned as a Captain and pursued a career in the Foreign Service of Pakistan, ultimately serving as a first secretary.

Subsequently, he resigned from the foreign service to set up a factory of Pepsi Cola in Pakistan and formed The Pepsi Cola Lahore Club cricket team, which emerged victorious in 14 out of 18 national club cricket tournaments spanning the 1980s to the 1990s.

In 1983, Qureshi joined the Lahore-based P&T Gymkhana, later becoming its chairman. Under him, the club produced four international umpires, including Aleem Dar, and Pakistani international cricketer and coach Abdul Razzaq. Qureshi encouraged the youth and veterans to play sports and was known for being a close friend of Imran Khan, assisting him in forming the Pakistan Tehreek-e-Insaf, Imran Khan Foundation, Namal Institute, and being the first to support Khan on building Shaukat Khanum Memorial Cancer Hospital and Research Centre, serving as a member of the hospital's Board of Governors since its inception until his death, and establishing Pakistan Veterans Cricket Association across Pakistan becoming its vice president and later chief executive officer. He is further known for being the first to greet Khan after Pakistan won the 1992 Cricket World Cup. Ashiq's nephew writes that Ashiq's home was littered with trophies from across the country to the extent that his aunt Farzana used some as flower pots.

His name is commemorated in a cricket championship known as the Bahawalpur Division Nawab Ashiq Hussain Qureshi Inter District CCA Challenge Trophy 2021–22. On 21 September 2022, the Pakistan Cricket Board in collaboration with the Southern Punjab cricket team (Pakistan) unveiled the Nawab Ashiq Hussain Trophy 2021–22.

== Early life and education ==
Ashiq Hussain Qureshi was born on 28 November 1949 and was one of the three sons of Sadiq Hussain Qureshi and Begum Haseen Bano Qureshi of the Pataudi family. A landed gentry family, Qureshi's grandmother Begum Abida Sultana was the sister of Iftikhar Ali Khan and married to Liaqat Hayat Khan.

Ashiq was named after his paternal grandfather, President of the Unionist Party (Punjab), Nawab Major Ashiq Hussain Qureshi.

He was educated at La Salle Higher Secondary School, Multan and Aitchison College where he was a classmate of Imran Khan. He was interested in cricket from an early age and was a member of Pakistan Under-19 cricket team.

== Personal life ==
Ashiq and his wife Farzana have four daughters Mahnaz, Mehreen, Sadaf, and Nida.

His cousin Shah Mahmood Qureshi is the former Foreign Minister of Pakistan.

== Military career ==
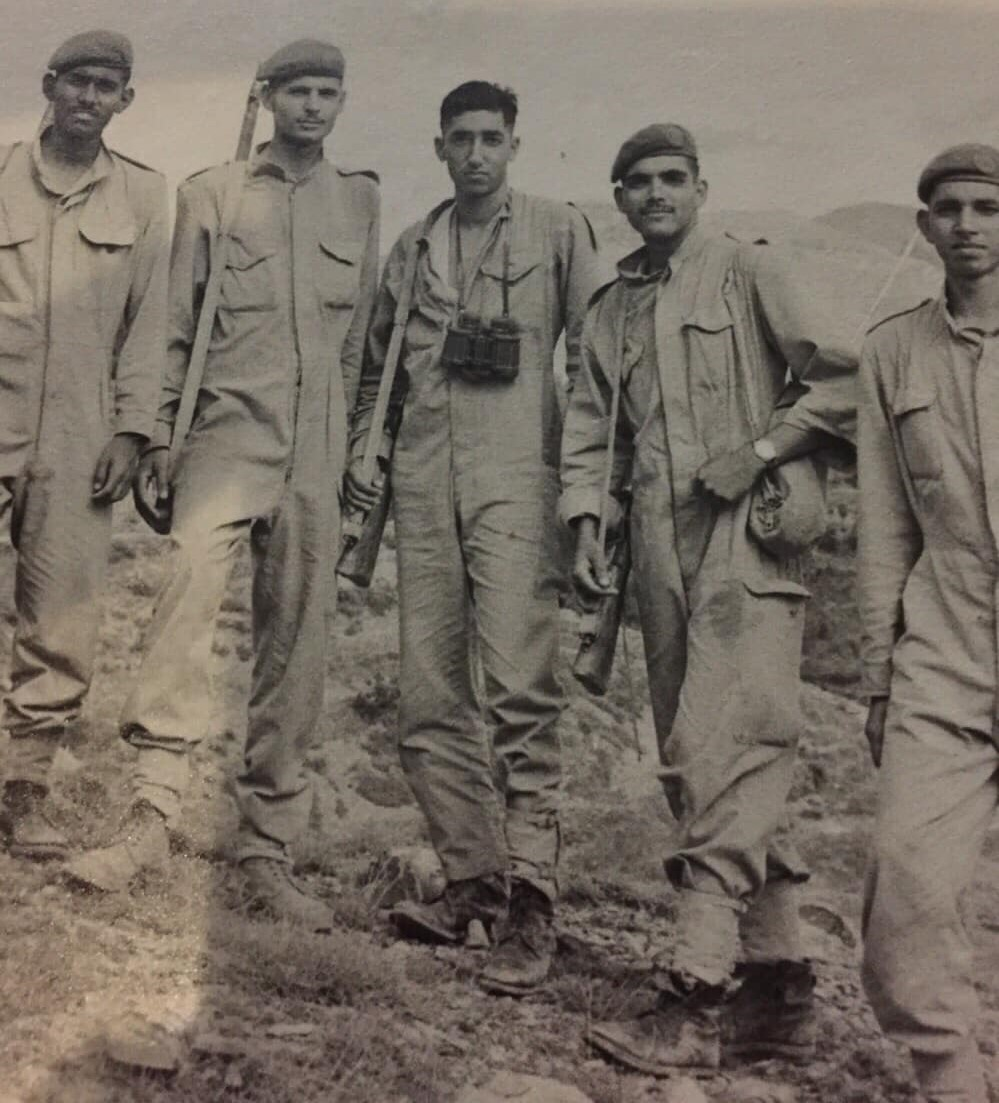
Gentlemen Cadet Qureshi (middle) with his colleagues undergoing training at PMA Kakul (1970)

Qureshi was commissioned into the 5th Horse (Probyn's Horse) of the Pakistan Army after graduating from the 45th course of the Pakistan Military Academy in August 1971.

== Diplomatic career ==
He retired as a Captain, opting for a career in the Foreign Service of Pakistan as a diplomat. He relinquished charge of the role of second secretary junior grade at the Pakistani embassy in London on 3 February 1978. (Note: Following his resignation, he took 26 days of earned leave, beginning on 6 February 1978. Permission was granted for him to include weekends in his leave, specifically on February 4–5 and March 4–5, 1978.)

Following his return to Pakistan in 1978, he focused on utilising cricket for societal transformation, establishing the P&T Gymkhana cricket club in Lahore. Under him, the club produced four international umpires including Aleem Dar and first-class cricketer Abdul Razzaq.

For a decade, he held the position of France's Honorary consul general in Lahore for which he received the French honor Ordre national du Mérite in 2018.

== Cricket career (1960s–1980s) ==
Qureshi played Under-19 cricket for Pakistan and met Imran Khan when they were both studying at Aitchison College. They were then selected for the Combined Lahore and Multan Schools team at Sahiwal against the touring team of Middlesex and Surrey schools.

Qureshi made his first-class cricket debut with Pakistan Railways against United Bank Limited (UBL) in the Quaid-e-Azam Trophy match held from 11 to 14 May 1984. He batted 5 not out in the second innings of Pakistan Railways and dismissed Mansoor Akhtar with a leg before wicket (lbw) in the second innings of UBL.

Qureshi played in the National Twenty20 (T20) Veterans cricket cup for the Lahore Lions against Islamabad Panthers in 2009 where he won the toss as skipper.

Beyond cricket, Qureshi was an athlete, holding multiple records at various levels. He was also an active philanthropist, contributing significantly to the establishment and functioning of Imran Khan's Shaukat Khanum Hospital, and heading Imran Khan Foundation which set up a college working with the University of Bradford to sponsor underprivileged students and providing relief to thousands affected by disasters across the country since 2000.

In his later years, he played a pivotal role in the establishment of veterans cricket in Pakistan, leading the over 50's side to the World Cup final. He is also remembered for his iconic photograph being the first to greet captain Imran Khan after Pakistan's 1992 Cricket World Cup victory in Melbourne.

== Cricket executive (1999–2019) ==
He briefly worked in the Pakistan Cricket Board as the Director Grass Root Cricket Development in 1999.

He was the Vice President of the Pakistan Veterans Cricket Association in 2001 becoming its chief executive officer on 22 September 2006 until his death.

In June 2019, he was the manager of the Pakistan Super Veterans (Over 60) cricket team touring England.

Five days before his death, he attended the inauguration of the Federal Board of Revenue (FBR)-Railways Veterans Cricket Championship at Railway Stadium.

== Death, reactions and funeral ==
At ten o'clock in the evening on 31 October 2019, Qureshi was rushed to the hospital after he felt pain in his chest and passed away on the way there. His funeral was held at the race course park of Lahore which was attended by friends and family including Shah Mehmood Qureshi, government officials, and Ehsan Mani, the Chairman of the Pakistan Cricket Board.

His body was flown to Multan where he was buried at the premises of the Shrine of Bahauddin Zakariya.

Prime Minister Imran Khan offered condolences to his family and said, "devastated by the death of one of my oldest friends Ashiq Qureshi last night. He was always there during my many setbacks in life. Was the first to stand by me when I decided to build SKMT & was a PTI founder member. Above all, he will be missed as a gentleman & great human being".

Aitchison College Principal Michael Thomson released a letter to the media and said: "Our dear Ashiq, You have left us far too early. Your enthusiasm and positive approach to life was our encouragement. Dear friend, when we opened the new Jafar Memorial Ground, it was as you envisaged, but minus the joy of seeing your face and listening to your prophetic words. It was you who led the way and you who filled us with the resolve to take on all challenges regardless of obstacles. Now, we pray for your everlasting peace and question not the Almighty who needs you more than us, but that we miss you desperately. Dear Ashiq, rest in peace until we meet again. Great servant of youth and Aitchison College, and your nation."

== Awards and decorations ==

Tamgha-e-Diffa (Defence Medal) 1971 War Clasp	Sitara-e-Harb 1971 War (War Star 1971)	Tamgha-e-Jang 1971 War (War Medal 1971)	Ordre national du Mérite (National Order of Merit) Knight (Chevalier)

== Foreign Honours ==
Foreign honours
France	National Order of Merit (Knight)
