= WINZ =

WINZ may refer to:

- WINZ (AM), a radio station in Miami, Florida
- WZTU, an FM radio station in Miami, Florida, formerly known as WINZ-FM
- Department of Work and Income, formerly known as Work and Income New Zealand (WINZ), an agency within the Ministry of Social Development (New Zealand)
- Victor Winz, a professional chess player

== See also ==
- WINS (disambiguation)
- Winze, a type of mining shaft
