= Winn =

Winn may refer to:

== Places ==
In the United States:

- Winn, Maine, a town in Penobscot County
- Winn, Michigan, an unincorporated community
- Winn Parish, Louisiana

== Other uses ==
- Winn (surname) (including a list of people with the name)
- WINN, an American radio station
- MV Dennis Winn, a passenger-cargo ship in commission in the fleet of the U.S. Fish and Wildlife Service from 1948 to 1960
- Winn-Dixie, supermarket chain based in Jacksonville, Florida whose NASDAQ stock symbol is "WINN"
- Winn Adami, a character in the science fiction television series Star Trek: Deep Space Nine

== See also ==
- Winn-Dixie 250, NASCAR Busch Series race
- Because of Winn-Dixie, a 2000 children's novel by Kate DiCamillo
  - Because of Winn-Dixie, a 2005 film adaptation of the novel
- Wynn (disambiguation)
