= Emerson University, Multan =

Public university in Multan, Pakistan

- Former names: Government College, Multan (1920–1933); Government Emerson College, Multan (1933–2021)
- Motto: Learn to Earn
- Type: Public
- Established: 13 April 1920; 106 years ago (as Government College, Multan); 15 February 2021; 5 years ago (as Emerson University)
- Affiliations: Higher Education Commission
- Chancellor: Governor of Punjab (ex officio)
- Vice-Chancellor: Dr. Hassaan Khaliq Qureshi
- Students: c. 7,000
- Location: Bosan Road, near Gol Bagh, Multan, Punjab, Pakistan; 30°13′16″N 71°26′42″E
- Campus: Urban
- Language: English
- Website: eum.edu.pk

Emerson University, Multan (formerly Government Emerson College, Multan) is a public-sector university in Multan, Punjab, Pakistan. The institution traces its origins to 1920 and was reconstituted as a degree-awarding university in 2021 under the Emerson University Multan Act 2021 (Punjab Act VIII of 2021).

== History ==
The institution was founded on 13 April 1920 as Government College, Multan, with its first campus at Chowk Katchery in the city. It was renamed Government Emerson College in 1933 in honour of Sir Herbert William Emerson (1881–1962), the then Governor of Punjab in British India, who had earlier served as Deputy Commissioner of Multan.

The college was relocated in 1963 to a new and larger campus on Bosan Road, accommodating an expanded enrolment that included postgraduate study. The original Chowk Katchery site was subsequently allocated to the Government College for Women, which later became part of the Government Women University, Multan.

Following the passage of the Emerson University, Multan Ordinance VI of 2021, the Government of Punjab's Higher Education Department issued a notification on 15 February 2021 reconstituting Government Emerson College, Multan as Emerson University, Multan under Section 3(1) of the ordinance. The reconstitution was subsequently consolidated by the Provincial Assembly of the Punjab through Punjab Act VIII of 2021, which provided the university's statutory framework. The university is recognised by the Higher Education Commission of Pakistan. Some teaching staff at the predecessor college protested the reconstitution at the time, arguing that a separate new university should have been established rather than upgrading an existing institution.

== Academics ==
Emerson University offers undergraduate and postgraduate programmes — including BS (four-year), M.Phil. and PhD degrees — across the arts and humanities, social sciences, natural sciences, management sciences and computer science. Intermediate-level programmes are not being offered.

== Notable alumni ==
- Tassaduq Hussain Jillani, 21st Chief Justice of Pakistan
- Samar Mubarakmand, nuclear physicist
- Nawabzada Nasrullah Khan, politician
- Makhdoom Sajjad Hussain Qureshi, former Governor of Punjab
- Inzamam-ul-Haq, cricketer and former captain of the Pakistan national cricket team
- Syed Jamshed Ali, former judge of the Supreme Court of Pakistan
- Faiz Mohammad Khan, medical physicist specialising in radiation oncology
- Mazhar Kaleem, novelist
- Tauqeer Nasir, actor and former director-general of the Pakistan National Council of the Arts
- Muhammad Ali, Lollywood actor
- Mohsin Naqvi, Urdu poet
- Irshad Hussain, chemist and nanomaterials scientist
- Khalid Masood Khan, poet and columnist
- Ehsan Wyne, lawyer and politician
