= La Salle Brothers, Pakistan =

- Type: Religious order
- Theology: Roman Catholicism
- Polity: De La Salle Brothers
- Governance: La Salle District of Australia, New Zealand, Pakistan and Papua New Guinea
- Structure: Mission
- Head of Mission: Br. Ambrose Payne
- Region: Pakistan
- Origin: 1960; 66 years ago
- Communities: Faisalabad, Khushpur, and Multan
- Primary schools: 1
- Secondary schools: 8
- Tertiary institutions: 1
- Other names: Institute of the Brothers of the Christian Schools, Pakistan
- Official website: www.delasalle.org.au/schools-and-ministries/pakistan.html

La Salle Brothers, Pakistan, formally the Institute of the Brothers of the Christian Schools in Pakistan, is a Roman Catholic religious order for men. The De La Salle Brothers was founded in France in 1679 by Saint Jean-Baptiste de la Salle, who is also the Patron of Christian Teachers. The order was founded for setting up gratuitous schools where the children of workmen and the poor would learn reading, writing and arithmetic, and would also receive a Christian education through catechisms and other forms of instruction appropriate for forming good Christians.

== History ==
The La Salle Brothers were established in Pakistan in 1960.

The La Salle Brothers also set up the St. Patrick's Technical School in Karachi in 1968 and Brother Norman Wray was its Principal for 15 years.

In 1999, the De La Salle brothers in Pakistan had two formation houses, in the Faisalabad and Lahore. In the last few years brothers from Sri Lanka, Malaysia, Malta and the United States have joined the brothers in Pakistan.

In 2010 the De La Salle Brothers celebrated their 50th anniversary in Pakistan. Brother Shahzad Gill was the Superior of the Pakistan Province. Many political figures, members of Parliament, and even Prime Minister Yousaf Raza Gillani, studied in Christian Brothers schools. It is an education based on the values of respect for others, rights, freedom, and individual responsibility, which helps to form leaders who are now guiding the nation.

== Schools ==
Today, the Christian Brothers' schools are in all the main cities of Pakistan, including the following locations:

- La Salle High School, Faisalabad
- La Salle Urdu School, Faisalabad
- La Salle Middle School, Sant Singh Wala
- La Salle School, Gokhowal
- St Catherine’s Primary School
- Don Bosco Home for Boys, Karachi
- La Salle High School, Multan
- La Salle Higher Secondary, Multan
- Alban Academy
- John Paul II Hostel for Boys, Rawalpindi
- Marie Adelaide Rehabilitation Centre, Sindh

== Organisation ==
In 2011 the Brothers formed a new district under the Australia, New Zealand and Papua New Guinea alliance. In 2012, Pakistan officially became part of the Australia, New Zealand and Papua New Guinea District. Br. Ambrose Payne heads the mission in Pakistan.

On 23 March 2012, the President of Pakistan conferred the civil award of Tamgha-e-Pakistan (Medal of Pakistan) on La Salle Brother Emmanuel Nicholas in recognition of his outstanding and meritorious services to the education sector in Pakistan.

In 2020 there were 16 young men undergoing training to be De La Salle Brothers in Pakistan. Training takes place at Miguel House, Faisalabad and usually lasts four years.

On 7 April 2020 the De La Salle Community in Multan celebrated the Tercentenary of Saint John Baptist De La Salle. The Chief Guest, Bishop Benny Mario Travas of Multan led the Mass attended by members of the community, the students and teachers of the school.
