= Zahoor Hussain Qureshi =

Pakistani politician

Member of the National Assembly of Pakistan
- In office 29 February 2024 – 26 October 2024
- Constituency: NA-146 Khanewal-III
- In office 13 August 2018 – 10 August 2023
- Constituency: NA-152 (Khanewal-III)

Personal details
- Born: 10 December 1973 (age 52) Khanewal, Punjab, Pakistan
- Party: PPP (2026-present)
- Other political affiliations: PTI (2013-2024)
- Relatives: Ashiq Hussain Qureshi (uncle); Shah Mehmood Qureshi (uncle); Zain Qureshi (Cousin)

Zahoor Hussain Qureshi (ظہور حسین قریشی) is a Pakistani politician who has been a member of the National Assembly of Pakistan since February 2024 and previously served in this position from August 2018 till January 2023 from the NA-152 constituency of Tehsil Mian Channu and Khanewal district. He was also made Parliamentary Secretary for Ministry of Power.

== Political career ==
He contested the 2013 Pakistani general election from NA-158 Khanewal-III as a candidate of Pakistan Tehreek-e-Insaf (PTI), but was unsuccessful. He received 71,807 votes and was defeated by Aslam Bodla, a candidate of Pakistan Muslim League (N) (PML(N)).

He was elected to the National Assembly of Pakistan from Constituency NA-152 (Khanewal-III) as a candidate of PTI in the 2018 Pakistani general election. He received 109,257 votes and defeated Aslam Bodla, a candidate of PML(N).

On 27 September 2018, Prime Minister Imran Khan appointed him as Federal Parliamentary Secretary for power.

He was re-elected to the National Assembly from NA-146 Khanewal-III as an independent candidate in the 2024 Pakistani general election. He received 112,777 votes and defeated Aslam Bodla, a candidate of PML(N).

== More Reading ==
- List of members of the 15th National Assembly of Pakistan
