= Astrid de Wijn =

Dutch applied physicist

De Wijn in 2017

Astrid Silvia de Wijn is a Dutch applied physicist who works in Norway as a professor in the Department of Mechanical and Industrial Engineering at the Norwegian University of Science and Technology (NTNU).

== Research ==
De Wijn describes her research area as "applied nonequilibrium statistical mechanics". It has included studies in the tribology of nanoscale surfaces and in the viscosity of complex fluids and gases, including the behavior of quick clay, phase transitions caused by too-careful driving in traffic jams, and nanoscale models of the material behavior that causes friction.

== Education and career ==
As a student in the Netherlands, de Wijn competed in the 1995 and 1996 International Physics Olympiads, earning an honourable mention and bronze medal. She studied for her Ph.D. with Henk van Beijeren at the Institute for Theoretical Physics of the Utrecht University, and finished her doctorate there in 2004.

She became a postdoctoral researcher at the Max Planck Institute for the Physics of Complex Systems in Dresden, Germany, from 2005 to 2006 with Velisa Vesovic in the Department of Earth Science and Engineering at Imperial College London from 2007 to 2008, with the support of a Dutch Research Council (NWO) Veni award at Radboud University Nijmegen from 2008 to 2011, and also at the University of Amsterdam in 2011.

Beginning in 2012 she became a researcher and part-time lecturer in the Department of Physics at Stockholm University in Sweden. In 2016 she took an associate professor position in Mechanical and Industrial Engineering at NTNU, while keeping a part-time researcher position at Stockholm University for four more years. In 2021 she was promoted to full professor at NTNU.

== Recognition ==
De Wijn is a member of the Royal Norwegian Society of Sciences and Letters, elected in 2023.
