= Winn (surname) =

Winn is a surname. Notable people with the name include:

- A. M. Winn (1810–1883), American politician
- Alan Winn (born 1996), American soccer player
- Alexander Winn (born 1986), American machinima filmmaker
- Anona Winn (1904–1994), Australian-born actress
- Ashley Winn (born 1985), American footballer
- Beatrice Winn Berlin (1922–1999) American printmaker, painter, and teacher
- Billy Winn (1909–1938), American racing driver
- Billy Winn (American football) (born 1989), American football player
- Bruce Winn (1959–2012), American ceramist
- Chris Winn (1926–2017), English rugby union player and cricketer
- Cole Winn (born 1999), American baseball player
- Coralie Winn, Australian-born New Zealand urban arts director
- Courtland Winn (1863–1940) American politician, lawyer, and civic leader
- Craig Winn, American author and businessman
- David Winn (born 1966), American animator and writer
- David W. Winn (1923–1990), United States Air Force general
- Deron Winn (born 1989), American mixed martial artist and freestyle wrestler
- Dresser Winn (born 1998), American football player
- Edward Winn (1937–1995), American third-party presidential candidate
- George Winn (1897–1969), American baseball player
- George Winn (American football) (born 1990), American football player
- Godfrey Winn (1906–1971), British journalist, writer and actor
- Grover C. Winn (1886–1943), American lawyer and politician
- H. Richard Winn, American neurosurgeon
- Haley Winn (born 2003), American ice hockey player
- Jack Winn (1898–1974), American football player
- Jane Frances Winn (1855–1927), American journalist
- Jean Winn, English table tennis player
- Jim Winn (born 1959), American baseball pitcher
- John Winn (1921–2015), British soldier
- Julian Winn (born 1972), Welsh cyclist
- Keaton Winn (born 1998), American baseball pitcher for the San Francisco Giants
- Kitty Winn (born 1944), American theatre and film actress
- Larry Winn (1919–2017), American politician
- Marcus Winn (born 1982), American football defensive back
- Marie Winn (1936–2024), American journalist, author, and bird-watcher
- Masyn Winn (born 2002), American baseball player
- Matt Winn (1861–1949), American horse racing personality
- Norman Winn (1900–1972), English footballer
- Paul Winn, Canadian human rights activist and lawyer
- Peter Winn, American historian
- Peter Winn (footballer) (born 1988), English footballer
- Philip D. Winn (1925–2017), American politician and diplomat
- Randy Winn (born 1974), American baseball outfielder
- Raynor Winn (born 1962), British writer
- Red Winn (born 1896, date of death unknown), American poker player
- Richard Winn (1750–1818), American merchant, surveyor, and politician from South Carolina
- Robert W. Winn (1895–1948), American politician from Missouri
- Rodger Winn (1903–1972), British judge
- Ross Winn (1871–1912), American anarchist writer and publisher
- Rowland Winn (disambiguation), several people
- Ryan Winn (born 1976), American comic book artist
- Sabine Winn (1734–1798), Swiss textile artist
- Sheridan Winn, British journalist and novelist
- Sherry Winn (born 1961), American handball player
- Steve Winn (born 1981), Welsh rugby union player
- Steve Winn (footballer) (born 1959), English footballer
- Ted Winn, American singer
- Tim Winn (born 1977), American basketball player
- Thomas E. Winn (1839–1925), American politician
- Valdenia Winn (born 1950), American politician
- Vincent Winn (born 1966), English cricketer
- William Winn (1945–2006), American educational psychologist and professor

== See also ==
- Wynn (surname)
