= Aslam Bodla =

Pakistani politician (born 1952)

- اسلم بودلہ

Member of the National Assembly of Pakistan
- In office 2002 – 31 May 2018
- Constituency: NA-158 (Khanewal-III)

Personal details
- Born: 15 March 1952 (age 74)
- Party: PMLN (2013-present)
- Other political affiliations: PML(Q) (2008); PPP (1988-2007)

Aslam Bodla (Urdu: اسلم بودلہ; born 15 March 1952) is a Pakistani politician who was a member of the National Assembly of Pakistan, from 1993 too 1988 and again from 2002 to May 2018.

== Early life ==
Bodla was born on 15 March 1952.

== Political career ==
He ran for the seat of the National Assembly of Pakistan as a candidate of Pakistan Peoples Party (PPP) from Constituency NA-123 (Khanewal-III) in the 1988 Pakistani general election but was unsuccessful. He received 55,419 votes and lost the seat to Ghulam Haider Wyne.

He ran for the seat of the National Assembly as a candidate of Pakistan Democratic Alliance (PDA) from Constituency NA-123 (Khanewal-III) in the 1990 Pakistani general election but was unsuccessful. He received 54,856 votes and lost the seat to Ghulam Haider Wynn.

He was elected to the National Assembly as a candidate of PPP from Constituency NA-123 (Khanewal-III) in the 1993 Pakistani general election. He received 72,658 votes and defeated Begum Majeeda Wyne.

He ran for the seat of the National Assembly as a candidate of PPP from Constituency NA-123 (Khanewal-III) in the 1997 Pakistani general election but was unsuccessful. He received 36,932 votes and lost the seat to Begum Majeeda Wyne.

He was elected to the National Assembly as a candidate of PPP from Constituency NA-158 (Khanewal-III) in the 2002 Pakistani general election. He received 73,481 votes and defeated Fakhar Imam. In the same election, he ran for the seat of the Provincial Assembly of the Punjab from Constituency PP-218 (Khanewal-VII) as a candidate of PPP but was unsuccessful. He received 27,866 votes and lost the seat to Abdul Razzaq Khan.

He was re-elected to the National Assembly as a candidate of Pakistan Muslim League (Q) (PML-Q) from Constituency NA-158 (Khanewal-III) in the 2008 Pakistani general election. He received 57,777 votes and defeated Pir Haider Zaman Qureshi, a candidate of PPP.

He was re-elected to the National Assembly as a candidate of Pakistan Muslim League (N) (PML-N) from Constituency NA-158 (Khanewal-III) in the 2013 Pakistani general election. He received 94,050 votes and defeated Peer Zahoor Hussain Quraishi, a candidate of Pakistan Tehreek-e-Insaf (PTI).
