= Win! =

- Directed by: Justin Webster
- Produced by: Richard Brown
- Starring: Claudio Reyna; David Villa; Frank Lampard; Jason Kreis
- Cinematography: Josué Andavert
- Release date: April 14, 2016 (Tribeca Film Festival)
- Running time: 102 Minutes

Win! is an all-access, vérité film about a former player turned sporting director, a coach and a team of diverse football players given the mission to create a professional soccer team from scratch in New York City. Manchester City FC, an English club with ambitions to spread a style of “beautiful” football around the globe, joined up with the New York Yankees and handed the job of Sporting Director of New York City FC to Claudio Reyna, former captain of the US National team. When Reyna selected Jason Kreis as the team's first coach, a race began to find players in the months before the inaugural season. Global soccer stars like David Villa and Frank Lampard join a growing squad of American rising stars, to face the highs and lows, joys and sacrifices, disappointments and triumphs of the first season. Playing in front of their home fans in Yankee Stadium, at a time when soccer has never been more popular in the US, they fight to win the hearts of New Yorkers.

The film had its World Premiere at the 2016 Tribeca Film Festival.
