= Soe Win =

Soe Win is the name of:

- Soe Win (prime minister) (1947–2007), Prime Minister of Burma
- Soe Win (general), deputy commander-in-chief of the Tatmadaw (Myanmar Armed Forces)
- Soe Win (minister) (born 1938), Minister for Planning and Finance of Myanmar (Burma)
- Soe Win (prince) (born 1947), Burmese diplomat
- Soe Win (MP) (born 1957), Burmese politician
- Soe Win (bodyguard) (1961–2020), the bodyguard and close confidant of the State Counsellor of Myanmar, Aung San Suu Kyi
