= Wynn (disambiguation) =

Wynn is a letter in the Old English alphabet.

Wynn may also refer to:

- Wynn (given name)
- Wynn (surname)
- Wynn Resorts
  - Wynn Las Vegas, in Las Vegas, Nevada, U.S.
  - Wynn Macau, in Macau, People's Republic of China
- Wynn's, an automotive company owned by Illinois Tool Works

== See also ==
- WYNN (disambiguation)
- Wynne (disambiguation)
- Wyn, a surname
- Wyne (disambiguation)
- Wynns (disambiguation)
- Winn (disambiguation)
