= The Winners (Canadian TV series) =

- Genre: Biography
- Country of origin: Canada
- Original language: English
- No. of seasons: 1
- No. of episodes: 10

Production
- Executive producer: Stanley Colbert
- Producer: Laura Phillips
- Running time: 30 minutes

Original release
- Network: CBC Television
- Release: 17 January – 2 September 1982

The Winners is a Canadian biographical television miniseries that aired on CBC Television in 1982.

== Premise ==
This series, sponsored by Shell Canada, presented docudramas of Canadian heroes.

== Scheduling ==
The half-hour episodes were originally broadcast on Sundays at 5:30 p.m. from 17 January to 28 March 1982. It was rebroadcast later that year on Sunday evenings from 15 July to 2 September.

== Episodes ==
1. Athol Murray, founder of Notre Dame College, Saskatchewan, portrayed by Donnelly Rhodes ("The Winners"); Gordon Ruttan (writer), Brian Walker (director)
2. Emily Murphy, portrayed by Martha Henry, co-starring Douglas Campbell, William Hutt, Gerard Parkes and Douglas Rain; John Kent Harrison (writer), Martin Lavut (director)
3. H.R. MacMillan - Norman Klenman (writer), Lawrence S. Mirkin (director)
4. Pauline Johnson, portrayed by Fern Henry - Munroe Scott (writer), Martha Coolidge (director)
5. J.A. Bombardier, portrayed by Yvon Ponton, James Brown (writer), Jean Lefleur (director)
6. Charlotte Whitton, portrayed by Kate Lynch; Carol Bolt (writer), Graham Parker (director)
7. John Wesley Dafoe - Fiona McHugh (writer), Scott Hylands (director)
8. Marion Hilliard, portrayed by Chapelle Jaffe, co-starring Peter Dvorsky, Janet-Laine Green, Lois Maxwell and Mary Pirie; Fiona McHugh (writer), Zale Dalen (director)
9. Reginald Fessenden, portrayed by Alan Scarfe; George Robertson (writer), Richard Gilbert (director)
10. Vilhjalmur Stefansson, portrayed by Michael J. Reynolds co-starring John Friesen and Eric Peterson; George Robertson and Alan Scarfe (writers)
