= Nazaria-i-Pakistan Trust =

Pakistani non-parochial national organization

Idara Nazaria-i-Pakistan (INP)
- Idara Nazaria-i-Pakistan Logo

- NPT active in Pakistan
- Abbreviation: NPT
- Formation: 15 July 1992; 34 years ago
- Type: Government organization
- Purpose: Academic-research institution for promoting the Ideology of Pakistan
- Headquarters: Lahore, Pakistan
- Region served: Pakistan
- Official language: Urdu, English
- Chairman of the Board: Majid Nizami
- Affiliations: Ministry of Finance
- Staff: 115
- Website: nazariapak.info
- Remarks: Non-parochial institution

Idara Nazaria-i-Pakistan (Urdu: ادارہ نظریہِ پاکستان , lit. 'Pakistan Ideology Trust') is a non-parochial national academic cum research institution for promoting the Ideology of Pakistan as declared by Quaid-i-Azam Mohammad Ali Jinnah and Allama Mohammad Iqbal. Nazaria-i-Pakistan was established in July 1992 by former Chief Minister of Punjab Ghulam Haider Wyne (Late). To perform this role the trust aims at those objectives for which Pakistan was established, recalling sacrifices rendered to achieve it, and creating awareness among people, particularly youth, about its ideological basis and its Islamic cultural heritage.

== Trust activities ==
The trust has multi-faceted objectives, such as preservation of the spirit and memory of the Pakistan Movement and propagation and projection of the Ideology of Pakistan; to work on national unity and to promote the ideology of Pakistan.

== Leadership ==
Below is a list of current and former chairmen's of the Nazaria-i-Pakistan Trust.

Name	Serving year
Mr. Ghulam Haider Wyne (Late)	1992 – 1999 (Founder)
Dr. Majid Nizami (Late)	1999 – 2014
Muhammad Rafiq Tarar (Late)	2014 – 2022
Mian Farooq Altaf	March 2022 – April 2022
Chief Justice (r) Shiekh Ijaz Nisar	2022 – present
