= Winner (surname) =

Winner is a surname. Notable people with the surname include:

- Albertine Winner (1907–1988), British physician and medical administrator
- Charley Winner (1924–2023), American football coach
- David Winner (author) (born 1956), English author and journalist
- David Winner (soccer) (born 1971), retired American soccer goalkeeper
- Joseph Winner (1837–1918), American composer
- Langdon Winner (born 1944), American philosopher of technology
- Lauren Winner (born 1976), American writer and educator
- Michael Winner (1935–2013), English film director, television personality, and food critic
- Reality Winner (born 1991), American accused of leaking intelligence documents
- Septimus Winner (1827–1902), American songwriter
