= Owen Wynne =

Owen Wynne may refer to:

- Owen Wynne (civil servant) (1652–1700), Welsh civil servant in England
- Owen Wynne (British Army officer) (1665–1737), British general and Irish MP
- Owen Wynne (1687–1756), Irish MP for Sligo Borough from 1713 to 1756
- Owen Wynne (1723–1789), Irish MP for Sligo County 1749–78, for Sligo Borough 1776–89
- Owen Wynne (1755–1841), Irish MP for Sligo Borough from 1790 to 1806 and 1820–30
- Owen Wynne (cricketer) (1919–1975), South African cricketer who played in 6 Tests from 1948 to 1950

== See also ==
- Sir Owen Wynn, 3rd Baronet
