= Wyn =

Wyn is a Welsh surname and given name. Notable people with the name include:

people with the surname:

- A. A. Wyn (1898–1967), American magazine publisher
- Aled Wyn Davies (born 1974), Welsh tenor
- Alun Wyn Davies, Welsh rugby player
- Alun Wyn Jones (born 1985), Welsh rugby player
- Cerith Wyn Evans (born 1958), conceptual artist, sculptor and film maker
- Dyfed Wyn-Evans (born 1969), Welsh baritone
- Owain Wyn Evans (born 1984), Welsh meteorologist, and drummer
- Eirug Wyn (1950–2004), Welsh satirical novelist
- Eliseus Williams (Eifion Wyn) (1867–1926), Welsh language poet
- Elizabeth Wyn Wood (1903–1966), Canadian sculptor fromn Orillia
- Emyr Wyn Lewis (born 1982), Welsh rugby player
- Eurig Wyn (1944–2019), Welsh politician
- Geraint Wyn Davies (born 1957), Welsh-Canadian actor
- Hedd Wyn (1887–1917), Welsh poet and farmer
- Ieuan Wyn Jones, (born 1949), Welsh politician
- Llewelyn Wyn Griffith (1890–1977), Welsh novelist
- Nesta Wyn Ellis, Welsh politician and writer
- Owen Wyn Owen (1925–2012), automobile restorer and mechanic
- Percy Wyn-Harris (1903–1979), English mountaineer, political administrator, and yachtsman
- Watcyn Wyn (1844–1905), Welsh schoolmaster and poet

people with the given name:

- Wyn Belotte (born 1984), Canadian soccer player
- Wyn Calvin (1925–2022), Welsh comedian and entertainer
- Wyn Cooper (born 1957), American poet
- Wyn Davies (born 1942), Welsh football player
- Wyn Davies (conductor) (born 1952), Welsh conductor
- Ieuan Wyn Jones (born 1949), Welsh politician
- Wyn Morris (1929–2010), Welsh conductor
- Wyn Roberts, Baron Roberts of Conwy (1930–2013), Welsh politician

== See also ==
- Wijn
- Wynn (disambiguation)
- Wynne (disambiguation)
- Win (disambiguation)
