= Ehsan Wyne =

Pakistani lawyer (born 1938)

Ehsan Wyne (born 3 May 1938) is a Pakistani lawyer, political activist and secretary general of the Awami National Party. He received his bachelor's degree from Government Emerson College Multan, and did LLB from SM Law College, Karachi. An active member of the National Awami Party since 1968, he was arrested numerous times due to his opposition to the military governments of Ayub Khan and Zia-ul Haq. In 2002-2003 he briefly served as Awami National Party acting president after the party leadership resigned following its shock defeat in the 2002 general elections.
