= David W. Winn =

United States Air Force general

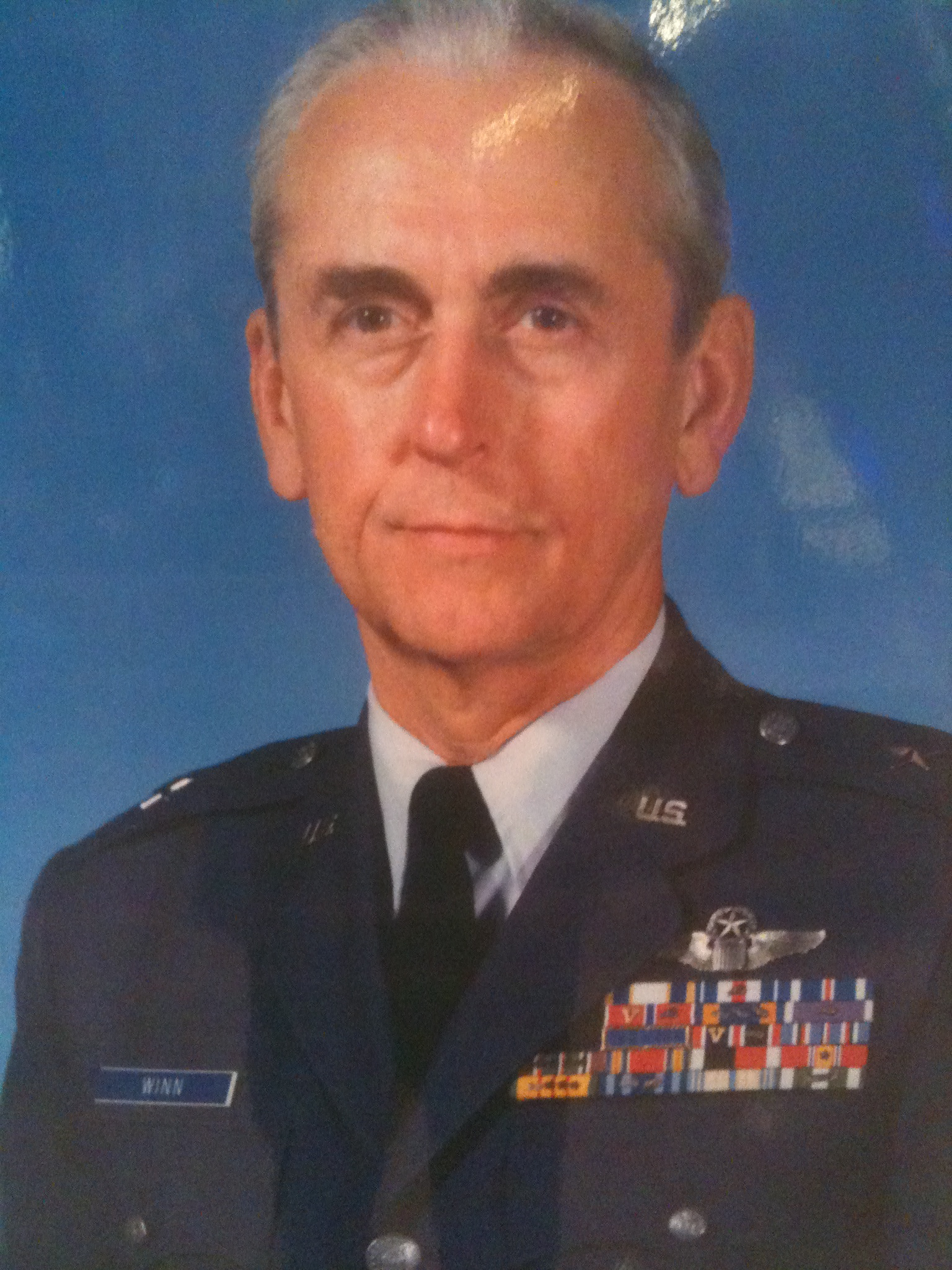
- Born: July 20, 1923; Austin, Minnesota
- Died: September 25, 2009 (aged 86)
- Military career
- Allegiance: United States of America
- Branch: United States Air Force
- Rank: Brigadier general

David W. Winn (July 20, 1923 – September 25, 2009) was a brigadier general in the United States Air Force.

== Biography ==
Winn was born in Austin, Minnesota, in 1923. He would attend Carroll College, the University of Minnesota, and George Washington University. Winn died on September 25, 2009.

== Career ==
Winn originally enlisted in the United States Army Air Forces in 1942. He was commissioned an officer the following year. During World War II he served with the Twelfth Air Force. Following the war he was assigned to the 109th Fighter Squadron. Later in his career he was assigned to the Office of the Joint Chiefs of Staff. In 1966, he entered the National War College. Later he served in the Vietnam War with the 355th Tactical Fighter Wing. He was captured in North Vietnam on 9 August 1968 and remained a prisoner of war for 1678 days until his release on 14 March 1973.

He was assigned to the Headquarters of the North American Air Defense Command in 1974. Winn's retirement was effective as of July 1, 1978.

Awards he received include the Distinguished Service Medal, the Silver Star with oak leaf cluster, the Distinguished Flying Cross, the Bronze Star Medal with valor device and oak leaf cluster, the Purple Heart with two oak leaf clusters, the Air Medal with three silver oak leaf clusters and two bronze oak leaf clusters, and the Distinguished Unit Citation.
