= William Wynn (footballer) =

Welsh footballer

Personal information
- Date of birth: 1876
- Place of birth: Wales
- Date of death: 1944 (aged 67–68)

Senior career*
| Years | Team | Apps | (Gls) |
- Shrewsbury Town

International career
| 1903 | Wales | 1 | (0) |
- * Club domestic league appearances and goals

William Wynn (1876 – 1944) was a Welsh international footballer. He was part of the Wales national football team, playing one match on 28 March 1903 against Ireland. At club level, he played for Shrewsbury Town.

== See also ==
- List of Wales international footballers (alphabetical)
