= Wynne (rapper) =

American rapper (born 1997)

- Born: Sina Wynne Holwerda; April 25, 1997 (age 29); Lake Oswego, Oregon, U.S.
- Education: University of Oregon (BA)
- Occupation: Rapper
- Years active: 2016–present
- Musical career
- Origin: Portland, Oregon, U.S.
- Genre: Hip hop
- Instrument: Vocals
- Label: EYRST
- Website: sinawynne.com

Sina Wynne Holwerda (born April 25, 1997), known mononymously as Wynne, is an American rapper. Born and raised in Lake Oswego, Oregon, she began rapping at age 12 and moved to Portland in 2016, where she began performing in cyphers. Videos of her freestyling went viral on various social media platforms from 2016 to 2018. She subsequently released her debut mixtape, If I May (2019), and two extended plays, Do My Own Stunts (2021) and Some Like It Hot (2023).

== Early life ==
Sina Wynne Holwerda was born on April 25, 1997, in Lake Oswego, Oregon to a mother who works as an attorney and a father who works as an investment manager. She was also raised in Lake Oswego, which she has called "very white" and "very separated". She has an older brother. When she was nine years old, he introduced her to rappers such as 50 Cent, Eminem, Jay-Z, and Lupe Fiasco, who she said gave her a "a window to the outside world". At age 12, she began writing poetry, and she started rapping in fourth grade, eventually rapping at a talent show in seventh grade. In high school, she read books about the history of hip hop, including Gospel of Hip Hop by KRS-One and Vibe History of Hip Hop. She studied music at the University of Oregon while working as a rapper. Despite her parents telling her she could drop out of college after witnessing her success as a rapper during her first year, she stayed due to her classes about social justice. After graduating, she moved to Portland.

== Career ==
Wynne began rapping as part of Portland's hip hop scene in 2016 in cyphers. A video of her freestyling over the beat of the 21 Savage song "Bank Account" went viral later that year after she posted it on Twitter and it was reposted on Instagram by Snoop Dogg. After posting the same video the next year, she gained over 70,000 followers, signed a publishing deal, and became managed by Courtney Stewart. She was also signed to Genius for distribution. Her 2017 songs "Cvtvlyst" and "Open Letter to Donald Trump" had progressive slants. In 2018, another video of her performing at the Portland rap showcase Mic Check went viral on Facebook when users mistakenly believed she was the daughter of rapper Eminem. Her singles "Buzzer" and "Don't Touch" were released in September and October 2018, respectively.

Her debut mixtape, If I May, was released on October 24, 2019. It was preceded by the singles "The Thesis", which features Portland rappers Dame D.O.L.L.A., KayelaJ, Vursatyl, and Illmaculate, and "Ego Check", a collaborative single with JID. In 2020, before the COVID-19 pandemic, she toured with EarthGang on its Welcome to Mirrorland Tour alongside Mick Jenkins and Spillage Village member Jurdan Bryant. Her collaborative extended play (EP) with producer Christo, Do My Own Stunts, was released in November 2021 on Portland record label EYRST Records. Its single "Carrot Cake" was released earlier that month. Her next EP, Some Like It Hot, was released in July 2023 with its lead single, "Jaw Morant", released in April of that year. Later that year, she embarked on the U.S. Some Like It Hot Tour, her first headlining tour.

== Musical style ==
PJ Somervelle of The Line of Best Fit wrote that Wynne had "fast flows and cadences" with lyrics "combining politics, humour and sports analogies". Vibe's Armon Sadler wrote in 2023 that Wynne had a "sexual image" and "very confident lines". Patrick Lyons of the Willamette Week wrote that Wynne "deliver[s] mile-a-minute rhymes in a dizzying array of flows".

== Discography ==
=== Mixtapes ===
List of mixtapes, with selected details
Title	Mixtape details
If I May	Released: October 24, 2019; Label: Self-released; Format: LP, digital download, streaming
