= Thomas A. Wynn =

American immunologist

Thomas A Wynn is an immunologist specializing in macrophage-mediated fibrosis in helminth infections.

He received a PhD in the department of microbiology and immunology at the University of Wisconsin-Madison Medical School He then did post-doctoral work with Dr. Alan Sher in the laboratory of parasitic diseases at the National Institute of Allergy and Infectious Diseases. He is now a senior investigator in NIAID.

Wynn is a fellow of the American Academy of Microbiology and has received the Oswaldo Cruz Medal of the Oswaldo Cruz Foundation and the Bailey K. Ashford Medal of the American Society of Tropical Medicine and Hygiene

== Selected publications ==
His most cited paper is Wynn (2008). "Cellular and molecular mechanisms of fibrosis". Journal of Pathology. 214 (1): 199–210. doi:10.1002/path.2277. ISSN 1096-9896. PMC 2693329. PMID 18161745. According to Google Scholar, it has received 1960 citations as of March, 2016.

Other papers include."

- Wynn, Thomas A; Ramalingam, Thirumalai R (2012). "Mechanisms of fibrosis: therapeutic translation for fibrotic disease". Nature Medicine. 18 (7): 1028–1040. doi:10.1038/nm.2807. ISSN 1078-8956. PMC 3405917. PMID 22772564.
