= Ghulam Haider Wyne =

Pakistani politician (1940–1993)

Ghulam Haider Wyne غلام حیدر وائیں MPA

10th Chief Minister of Punjab
- In office 8 November 1990 – 25 April 1993
- President: Ghulam Ishaq Khan
- Prime Minister: Mian Nawaz Sharif
- Governor: Mian Muhammad Azhar
- Preceded by: Mian Nawaz Sharif
- Succeeded by: Manzoor Wattoo
- Constituency: Mian Channu, Punjab, Pakistan
- Majority: Islami Jamhoori Ittehad

Leader of the Opposition
- In office 3 December 1988 – 6 June 1989

Member of the National Assembly of Pakistan
- In office 1988–1990
- In office 1990–1993

Member of the Provincial Assembly of the Punjab
- In office 1985–1988

Personal details
- Born: Ghulam Haider Wyne; 1940 Amritsar, Punjab, British India
- Died: 29 September 1993 (aged 52–53) Mian Channu, Punjab, Pakistan
- Resting place: Mian Channu
- Party: Pakistan Muslim League (Nawaz)
- Other political affiliations: Islami Jamhoori Ittehad
- Spouse: Begum Majeeda Wyne
- Occupation: Politician
- Profession: Political Worker

Ghulam Haider Wyne (Note: Punjabi/Urdu: غلام حیدر وائیں) (1940 – 29 September 1993) was a Pakistani politician who served as the tenth chief minister of Punjab from 1990 to 1993. He was a senior leader of Islami Jamhoori Ittehad, and later the Pakistan Muslim League (N).

== Early life ==
Wyne's family migrated from India to Pakistan in 1947 after the independence of Pakistan. He began his career as a typist at Ghazi Industries, Mian Channu.

== Political career ==
He was the Leader of the Opposition (Pakistan) and former chief minister of Pakistan's most populous province Punjab (Pakistan). He held chief minister's position from 1990 to 1993, when President Ghulam Ishaq Khan dissolved the Provincial Assembly of the Punjab and removed his government in 1993 from Punjab along with Nawaz Sharif's government in Pakistan.

Ghulam Haider had risen from an ordinary political worker to the opposition leader in the National Assembly of Pakistan and later the Chief Minister of Punjab, Pakistan. He regretted that the nation had not followed the principles of Quaid-i-Azam and the objectives for which he had established Pakistan could not be achieved. He was a down to earth politician who had devoted his life to the welfare of the nation. He led a simple and honourable life in an ordinary house in the ghettos of Mian Channu. He never plundered national wealth like some other politicians. Once he presented a few copies of daily Nawa-i-Waqt which were kept in an old iron box and said he had carried these copies from Amritsar while migrating to Pakistan. He visited England to collect donations for his school projects.

== Nazaria-i-Pakistan Trust ==
Ghulam Haider Wyne was the founder and the first chairman of Nazaria-i-Pakistan Trust (NPT) which he established in July 1992. He provided over 40 kanal government land to the Nazaria-i-Pakistan Trust near Johar Town Lahore. He set up over 18 educational institutions in the small city of Mian Channu. For his contributions in promoting education, he is still remembered as Sir Syed Ahmad Khan of Mian Channu.

== Assassination ==
Ghulam Haider Wyne was murdered in retaliation for the killing of a bandit leader during his premiership. He was ambushed by members of the slain bandit leader's clan near Mian Channu during his election campaign on 29 September 1993. Zaman, his convicted killer was executed in jail, in October 2015.

In October 2004, an event was organized by the Nazaria-i-Pakistan Foundation and Pakistan Movement Workers Trust in Lahore where Justice Javed Iqbal and veteran journalist Majid Nizami paid tributes to Ghulam Haider Wyne.

A road near Mian Channu city was named after Ghulam Haider Wyne by Punjab Chief Minister Shahbaz Sharif in October 2009.

== Notes ==
Political offices
Preceded by Nawaz Sharif	Chief Minister of Punjab; 8 November 1990 – 25 April 1993	Succeeded by Manzoor Wattoo
