= Begum Majeeda Wyne =

Pakistani politician

Member of the National Assembly of Pakistan
- In office 1 June 2013 – 31 May 2018
- Constituency: Reserved seat for women

Personal details
- Party: Pakistan Muslim League (N)
- Spouse: Ghulam Haider Wyne

Begum Majeeda Wyne (Urdu: بیگم مجیدہ وائیں) is a Pakistani politician who was a member of the National Assembly of Pakistan from 1997 to 1999 and again from June 2013 to May 2018.

== Family ==
She was the wife of Ghulam Haider Wyne, former Chief Minister of Punjab.

== Political career ==
She ran for the seat of the National Assembly of Pakistan as a candidate of Pakistan Muslim League (N) (PML-N) from Constituency NA-123 (Khanewal-III) in the 1993 Pakistani general election but was unsuccessful. She received 50,454 votes and lost the seat to Aslam Bodla.

She was elected to the National Assembly as a candidate of PML-N from Constituency NA-123 (Khanewal-III) in the 1997 Pakistani general election. She received 68,701 votes and defeated Aslam Bodla.

She was re-elected to the National Assembly as a candidate of PML-N on reserved seats for women from Punjab in the 2013 Pakistani general election.
