= Mian Channu Tehsil =

Administrative subdivision in Khanewal District, Punjab, Pakistan

Mian Channu Tehsil تحصِيل مِياں چنُّوں
- Tehsil
- Location in Pakistan
- Country: Pakistan
- Region: (Punjab, Pakistan) Punjab
- District: Khanewal
- Capital: Mian Channu
- Towns: 11
- Union councils: 36

Area
  - Tehsil: 1,212 km^{2} (468 sq mi)

Population (2017 Census of Pakistan)
  - Tehsil: 761,955
  - Density: 628.68/km^{2} (1,628.3/sq mi)
  - Urban: 122,095
  - Urban density: 16.02/km^{2} (41.5/sq mi)
  - Rural: 639,860
- Time zone: UTC+5 (PST)
  - Summer (DST): UTC+5 (PDT)
- Area code: +92-65

Mian Channu (Urdu: تحصِيل مِياں چنُّوں) is an administrative subdivision (tehsil) of Khanewal District in the Punjab province of Pakistan. Its capital is Mian Channu city.

== Administration ==
The tehsil of Mian Channu is administratively subdivided into 29 union councils:

- Chak No. 94/15L
- Chak No. 98/15L
- Chak No. 16/8-BR
- Chak No. 14/8ar
- Chak No. 13/8ar
- Chak No. 12/8ar
- Chak No. 11/8ar
- Chak No. 10/8ar
- Chak No. 09/8ar
- Chak No. 100/15L Arain Wala
- Chak No. 105/15L Vanjari
- Chak No. 108/15L
- Chak No. 115/15L
- Chak No. 123/7-ER Chishtian Wala
- Chak No. 124/15L
- Chak No. 126/15L
- Chak No. 129/15L
- Chak No. 131/15L Lakanwala
- Chak No. 134/16L
- Chak No. 137/16L
- Chak No. 14/8-AR
- Chak No. 42/15L UC-66 (newly added UC)
- Chak No. 44/15L
- Chak No. 45/15L
- Chak No. 57/15L
- Chak No. 61-A/15L
- Chak No. 7/8-AR
- Chak No. 72-73/15L
- Chak No. 74/15L
- Chak No. 78/15L
- Chak No. 84/15L
- Chak No. 92/15L
- Chak No. 93/15L
- Chak No. 64/15L Chandi Wali
- Ghogatta Panjoana
- Mian Channu-1
- Jarahi Khanewal
- Mian Channu-I
- Mian Channu-II
- Mian Channu-III
- Noori Suhag
- Rotla Khanewal / Rotla
- Tulamba
- Chak No. 2.8/BR
- Chak No. 20.8/BR
- Chak No 132/16,L

Large rural populations include the villages 102/15 L (most populous village in Mian Channu tehsil), 98/15 L, 96/15 L and 105/15 L (Vanjari).
