= Asghar Hayat =

Pakistani politician

Barrister Muhammad Asghar Hayat Hiraj
- محمد اصغر حیات ہراج

Member of the Provincial Assembly of the Punjab
- Incumbent
- Assumed office 24 February 2024
- Constituency: PP-212 Khanewal-VIII

Personal details
- Party: PMLN (2024–present)
- Relations: Raza Hayat Hiraj (brother); Muhammad Akbar Hayat Hiraj (brother)
- Parent: Mahr Khizar Hayat Hiraj
- Education: Lincoln's Inn
- Profession: Barrister; politician

Muhammad Asghar Hayat Hiraj (Urdu: محمد اصغر حیات ہراج) is a Pakistani politician who serves as a Member of the Provincial Assembly of Punjab.

== Family ==
He was born to Mahr Khizar Hayat Hiraj and is brother of Raza Hayat Hiraj and Muhammad Akbar Hayat Hiraj. His brother, Raza Hayat Hiraj, was a Member of the National Assembly of Pakistan from 2002 to 2018 and has won the 2024 Pakistani general election from Constituency NA-144 Khanewal-I. His brother Muhammad Akbar Hayat Hiraj was a Member of the Provincial Assembly of Punjab from 2013 to 2018 and has won the 2024 Pakistani general election from Constituency PP-205 (Khanewal-I).

His uncle, Sardar Allah Yar Hiraj, father of Hamid Yar Hiraj, served as a Member of the Provincial Assembly of Punjab from 1985 to 1996. Hamid Yar Hiraj has also served as a Member of the Provincial Assembly of Punjab from 2018 to 2023 and of the National Assembly of Pakistan from 2002 to 2013. His other uncle, Iqbal Hiraj, served as a Member of the Provincial Assembly of West Pakistan from 1962 to 1969 and as a Member of the National Assembly of Pakistan from 1988 to 1990 and again from 1993 to 1996.

== Political career ==
He participated in the 2024 Punjab provincial election as an independent candidate from Constituency PP-212 Khanewal-VIII and won by securing 42,305 votes, while the runner-up Syed Hussain Jahania Gardezi got 38,099 votes. He joined PML-N on 14 February 2024. He took oath as member of the Punjab Assembly on 23 February 2024.
