= Muhammad Akbar Hayat Hiraj =

Pakistani politician

- محمد اکبر حیات ہراج

Member of the Provincial Assembly of the Punjab
- Incumbent
- Assumed office 24 February 2024
- Constituency: PP-205 Khanewal-I

Member of the Provincial Assembly of the Punjab
- In office 29 May 2013 – 31 May 2018
- Constituency: PP-212 (Khanewal-I)

Personal details
- Born: 18 April 1970 (age 56) Multan, Punjab, Pakistan
- Party: PPP (2025-present)
- Other political affiliations: PMLN (2024-2025); PTI (2018-2023); PMLN (2013-2018)
- Relations: Raza Hayat Hiraj (brother); Asghar Hayat (brother)
- Parent: Mahr Khizar Hayat Hiraj
- Education: Government College University, Lahore; Quaid-i-Azam University; American InterContinental University

Muhammad Akbar Hayat Hiraj (Urdu: محمد اکبر حیات ہراج; born 18 April 1970) is a Pakistani politician who serves as a Member of the Provincial Assembly of Punjab.

== Early life and education ==
He was born on 18 April 1973 in Multan to Mahr Khizar Hayat Hiraj.

He graduated in 1993 from Government College, Lahore. He holds a Master of Science degree in International Relations, obtained in 1996 from Quaid-e-Azam University, and a Master of Business Administration degree, received in 2001 from American InterContinental University.

== Career ==
He served as Assistant Director in the Intelligence Bureau during 1996-97 and also worked as a consultant in PEMRA during 2002-04.

== Politics ==
He served as Tehsil Nazim of Kabirwala during 2004-09.

=== 2013 Elections ===
He participated in the 2013 Punjab provincial election as an independent candidate from Constituency PP-212 (Khanewal-I). He joined Pakistan Muslim League (N) in May 2013.

=== 2018 Elections ===
He participated in the 2018 Punjab provincial election as a candidate of Pakistan Tehreek-e-Insaf from Constituency PP-203 (Khanewal-I) and secured 47,267 votes but lost to Syed Khawar Ali Shah.

=== 2024 Elections ===
He participated in the 2024 Punjab provincial election as an independent candidate from Constituency PP-205 (Khanewal-I) and won by securing 63,128 votes. He joined PML-N on 14 February 2024. He took oath as member of the Punjab Assembly on 23 February 2024.

== Family ==
His brother, Raza Hayat Hiraj, was a Member of the National Assembly of Pakistan from 2002 to 2018 and has won the 2024 Pakistani general election from Constituency NA-144 Khanewal-I. His uncle, Sardar Allah Yar Hiraj, father of Hamid Yar Hiraj, served as a Member of the Provincial Assembly of the Punjab from 1985 to 1996.
