= Raza Hayat Hiraj =

Pakistani politician (born 1965)

Muhammad Raza Hayat Harraj
- محمد رضا حیات ہراج

Ministry of Defence Production (Pakistan)
- Incumbent
- Assumed office 5 March 2025
- President: Asif Ali Zardari
- Prime Minister: Shehbaz Sharif

Member of the National Assembly of Pakistan
- Incumbent
- Assumed office 29 February 2024
- Constituency: NA-144 Khanewal-I
- In office 2013–2018
- Succeeded by: Syed Fakhar Imam
- Constituency: NA-156 (Khanewal-I)
- In office 2008–2013
- Constituency: NA-156 (Khanewal-I)
- In office 2002–2008
- Constituency: NA-156 (Khanewal-I)

Ministry of Housing and Works (Pakistan)
- In office 3 May 2011 – 19 June 2012
- President: Asif Ali Zardari
- Prime Minister: Yusuf Raza Gilani

Ministry of Overseas Pakistanis and Human Resource Development
- In office 25 April 2006 – 15 November 2007
- President: Pervez Musharraf
- Prime Minister: Shaukat Aziz

Minister of State for Parliamentary Affairs
- In office 23 November 2002 – 24 April 2006
- President: Pervez Musharraf
- Prime Minister: Zafarullah Khan Jamali

Minister of State for Human Rights
- In office 23 November 2002 – 26 June 2004
- President: Pervez Musharraf
- Prime Minister: Zafarullah Khan Jamali

Personal details
- Born: 21 July 1965 (age 61)
- Party: IPP (2026-present)
- Other political affiliations: PMLN (2024-2026); PTI (2018-2024); PMLN (2013-2018); PML(Q) (2008-2013); PPP (2002-2008)
- Parent: Mahr Khizar Hayat Hiraj
- Relatives: Muhammad Akbar Hayat Hiraj (brother); Asghar Hayat (brother)
- Education: University of Leicester
- Occupation: Politician

Barrister Muhammad Raza Hayat Harraj (Urdu: محمد رضا حیات ہراج; born 21 July 1965) is a Pakistani politician who is the MNA from NA-144 (Khanewal-I) for the 16th National Assembly of Pakistan and has been a member of the National Assembly of Pakistan from 2002 to May 2018. He has served as Pakistan's Minister for Defense Production since 5 March 2025.

== Early life and education ==
Muhammad Raza Hayat Hiraj was born on 21 July 1965 to Mahr Khizar Hayat Hiraj. He received his LLB degree from the University of Leicester in 1992.

== Political career ==
=== First term (2002–2008) ===
He was elected to the National Assembly of Pakistan as a candidate for the Pakistan Peoples Party (PPP) from Constituency NA-156 (Khanewal-I) in the 2002 Pakistani general election. He received 86,438 votes and defeated Fakhar Imam, a candidate of Pakistan Muslim League (Q) (PML-Q). He became part of Pervez Musharraf's cabinet and served as Minister of State for Information Technology, Law, Justice, Human Rights, Parliamentary Affairs, and Overseas Pakistanis.

On 13 October 2003, he articulated Pakistan's stance during the plenary session of the United Nations General Assembly regarding equitable representation and the expansion of Security Council membership. He said: "Pakistan firmly believes that objectives of reform and expansion of the Security Council should be to promote greater democracy, and participation, and transparency, and accountability, in the work of the Security Council".

=== Second term (2008–2013) ===
He was re-elected to the National Assembly as a candidate of PML-Q from Constituency NA-156 (Khanewal-I) in the 2008 Pakistani general election. He received 71,381 votes and defeated Syed Fakhar Imam, a candidate of PPP.

In April 2011, he introduced a private constitutional amendment bill in the National Assembly seeking the disqualification of parliamentarians and bureaucrats holding dual nationalities or possessing assets or bank accounts outside Pakistan. Article 62 and 63 elaborate on the conditions under which a person can be removed.

In August 2011, he said there were disparities in resource allocation between central and South Punjab and demanded a new province.

=== Third term (2013–2018) ===
He was re-elected as a member of the National Assembly as an independent candidate from Constituency NA-156 (Khanewal-I) in the 2013 Pakistani general election. He received 79,675 votes and defeated Syed Fakhar Imam, a candidate of Pakistan Muslim League (N) (PML-N). Syed Fakhar Imam accused him of rigging the election and initiated a rigging petition against him in the Election Commission of Pakistan.

In May 2013, he joined PML-N. He served as Minister of Housing and Works from 3 May 2011 to 19 June 2012.

In March 2018, he quit PML-N and joined Pakistan Tehreek-e-Insaf. He participated as a candidate of PTI from Constituency NA-156 (Khanewal-I) in the 2018 Pakistani general election and secured 92,039 votes but lost in a rematch with Syed Fakhar Imam, who as an independent candidate secured 101,520 votes.

=== Fourth term (2024–present) ===
In the 2024 Pakistani general election, he participated as an independent candidate from Constituency NA-144 Khanewal-I against Syed Abid Imam, the son of Syed Fakhar Imam and Abida Hussain. He won with 118,999 votes, while Syed Abid Imam secured 78,269 votes. He joined PML-N on 14 February 2024. He took oath on 29 February 2024. On 7 March 2025, he was appointed Minister for Defence Production.
