= Daha (clan) =

Pakistani community and surname

Daha ڈاہا
- Location: Kabirwala, Khanewal, and Multan
- Parent tribe: Parmar
- Language: Saraiki, Punjabi, Urdu
- Religion: Islam
- Surnames: Daha

Daha (Urdu: ڈاہا) is a Rajput clan of Agnivanshi descent, found in Kabirwala, Khanewal, and Multan. The name Daha is used as a surname for this clan. The clan name is also used by Jats.

== History ==
They are Parmar and claim descent from Maharaja Sri Khand. In the twentieth generation from him came Daha, son of Rana Dohej, and it is after Daha that his descendants are known by the patronymic Daha. The Dahas remained Hindu for thirty-two generations until one of their progenitors accepted Islam and took the name Taqi Khan. The family held positions of considerable distinction during both the Mughal and Sikh periods. Hasan Khan, the thirteenth in line of descent from Singar Khan, was exempt from the road taxes of Makhdoompur and Sheikh Malka, as well as the river taxes at the Beas. His grandson, Ziadat Khan I, was appointed to the chief administrative charge of Kot Kamalia, Tulamba, Tibbi, and Luddan. During the tenure of Sawan Mal and Karam Narain, he was granted a share of the revenue generated from these territories. In addition, he held land revenue assignments in Sheikh Malka, Khanewal, and Khairpur. At the commencement of British rule in Punjab, the head of the family was Khan Shah Muhammad Khan, the son of Ziadat. He rendered assistance to the British during the Indian Rebellion of 1857 and, in recognition of his support, was appointed zaildar and Divisional Durbari. He was awarded a sanad accompanied by a cash grant of Rs. 50 by Robert Montgomery.

The original home of the Dahas was in Dhar State, from where they migrated to Derawar in Bahawalpur State, then to a place near Pakpattan, and eventually settled in Khanewal. Singar Khan, a descendant of Taqi Khan, was the first member of the family to settle in Khanewal.

== Notable people ==
=== Politics ===
- Nishat Khan Daha
- Muhammad Khan Daha
