= Abida Hussain =

Pakistani politician, diplomat and socialite

Minister of Food and Agriculture
- In office 21 February 1997 – 12 October 1999
- Prime Minister: Nawaz Sharif
- Preceded by: Yousuf Talpur
- Succeeded by: Sikandar Hayat Bosan
- Constituency: NA-87

Minister of Population Control and Census
- In office 21 July 1997 – 12 October 1999
- Deputy: Ahsan Iqbal (Dy Chair. of the PLANCOM)
- Preceded by: Julius Salik
- Succeeded by: Omar Asghar Khan

Pakistan Ambassador to the United States
- In office 26 November 1991 – 24 April 1993
- Appointed by: Nawaz Sharif
- President: Ghulam Ishaq Khan
- Preceded by: Najmuddin Shaikh
- Succeeded by: Dr. Maliha Lodhi

Personal details
- Born: Syed Abida Hussain; 1948 (age 77–78) (Note: According to the launching ceremony of Abida Hussain's book in Delhi in 2016, the Telegraph India noted and quoted her age 68 in 2016. While, earlier, the political taboloid, The Nation reported her age 66 in 2014.) Jhang, Punjab, Pakistan
- Citizenship: Pakistani
- Party: PPP (2023-2025)
- Other political affiliations: PMLN (2022-2023); PTI (2018-2022); PMLN (2013-2018); PPP (2008-2013); PML-Q (2001-2008); PMLN (1997-1999); PPP (1993-1996); PMLN (1990-1993); Islami Jamhoori Ittehad (1988-1990); Pakistan Muslim League (1985-1988)
- Spouse: Fakhar Imam
- Relations: Jugnu Mohsin (cousin)
- Children: Sughra Imam (Daughter)
- Parent: Syed Abid Hussain Shah (father)
- Education: Bahauddin Zakariya University (B.A. in Poly Sci.)
- Profession: Landlord, diplomat

Syeda Abida Hussain–Imam (سيدہ عابدہ حسین b. 1948) is a Pakistani conservative politician, diplomat and socialite on the platform of the Pakistan Muslim League (N).

Born into a feudal family in Pakistan, she served as the Pakistan Ambassador to the United States from 1991 to 1993, and the Minister of Food and Agriculture Population Control in the second administration of Nawaz Sharif from 1997 until being removed in 1999.

She is known for her political views that reflect fiscal conservatism on economical issues as well as for her conservation of the environment and wildlife of Pakistan.

== Biography ==
=== Early life and family background ===
Abida Hussain was born in Jhang, Punjab in Pakistan, into a wealthy family that owned farmhouses, cattle ranges and ranches in 1948. Her father, landlord Syed Abid Hussain Shah, was an honorary Colonel in the Indian Army and a politician who was elected on the platform of the Muslim League for a seat in the Constituent Assembly of India in 1945–47. He first served as a cabinet minister in the Ministry of Talents of the Prime Minister, Mohammad Ali Bogra in 1954–55, and later as a cabinet minister in the administration of Feroze Khan in 1958.

Hussain received a British-style education at Convent of Jesus and Mary in Lahore where she qualified for her Cambridge exams and later completed her O and A-Level qualifications from Surval Montreux in Switzerland. She spent additional semesters studying history in Florence in Italy but did not obtain her degree and returned to Pakistan after being arranged to marry Fakhar Imam, her cousin, who was a bureaucrat at that time.

After the military takeover in 1999 and the presidential ordinance enforced in 2002, Abida was disqualified from participating in national politics due to the lack of submitting proof of a baccalaureate degree to the Election Commission, which is a requirement. In 2002, she went to attend the undergraduate program in Economics at the Bahauddin Zakariya University (BZU) but switched her major, and graduated with B.A. in Political Science in 2008.

=== Personal life ===
Abida Hussain is married to Fakhar Imam who is also a politician on PML(N)'s platform. She is a Shia muslim.

Her daughter, Sughra, pursued her footsteps and is also a politician on the PML(N)'s platform and currently tenuring in the Provincial Assembly of the Punjab.

== Public service in Pakistan ==
=== Mayor of Jhang ===
After her father's death in 1971, Abida Hussain entered national politics on the platform of the Pakistan Peoples Party (PPP) and won Jhang constituency during the general elections held in 1970. After being elected to the Provincial Assembly of Punjab, she was appointed chairperson of the People's Workers Programme, and sat as a backbencher. In 1974–75, she was opposed to the nationalization of industries and land reforms initiated by Prime Minister Zulfikar Ali Bhutto, causing strains with her in the party.

In 1977, she lost her party's constituency nomination to Haider Bharwana. In 1979, she was elected Mayor of Jhang, becoming the first woman to head a city government, and was re-elected in 1983.

When the 1985 general election was announced, she joined the Pakistan Muslim League (PML) and stood in Constituency NA-87 against clergy member, Rehmatullah Bharwana; she was noted as the first women to be elected to the National Assembly on a general seat. In 1988, she sided with the conservative faction led by Fida Mohammad Khan, and joined the PML(N) led by its President Fida Mohammad.

In the 1990 general election, she fought the election against the influential cleric, Haq-Nawaz Jhangvi, who later founded the violent LeJ after losing the elections for Constituency NA-87 to Abida Hussain. After her name was placed on a hit list by the LeJ, Prime Minister Nawaz Sharif became concerned for her safety, and immediately appointed her as the Pakistan Ambassador to the United States effective immediately in 1990.

=== Pakistan Ambassador to the United States ===
On 26 November 1991, Abida Hussain took the charge of the plenipotentiary of the Pakistan Embassy in the Washington, D.C. in the United States— she was the first woman diplomat to be appointed as the Pakistan Ambassador to the United States. Her appointment came at the troublant time for the foreign relations with the United States, due to Americans placing the military embargo on the Pakistan's military. She acted as Pakistan's principle negotiator with the United States Department of State, and described the meetings with the American officials stressful due to Americans keep demanding the rollback of the clandestine atomic bomb program.

At the time of her launch of her autobiography, she later identified the issue of nuclear weapons was the principal source of distress between bilateral ties of Pakistan and the United States. Hussain has written in her memoir that the "conversations and negotiations with the American functionaries and the American politicians were quite rough. Because they would make only one demand: "Roll back your [atomic] program". And, since I was quite clear that we cannot do that, our conversations were not friendly." In talks with Sharif in Islamabad, Abida Hussain recommended cancelling of the acquisitions of the F-16s fighter jets and have funds refunded from the United States government, which Sharif was also of the same view point.

Abida later levelled accusations on the American contractor, General Dynamics, of bribing her after making the suggestions as the contractor wanted Pakistan to continue funding the F-16 program for the Pakistan Air Force until the contract ended. She also maintained that the chair of the board of directors of the General Dynamics, offered her to pay off her children's expensive education in Harvard and Yale, and also offered an estate in Washington, D.C.: she rejected the offers and confided her conversation Sharif in 1993.

In an interview with The Telegraph in 2016 in India, Abida Hussain claimed that, U.S. Vice President Al Gore mistook her twice as her deputy chief was the ambassador. After the general elections held in 1993, Prime Minister Benazir Bhutto recalled her from her diplomatic assignment, and posted Dr. Maliha Lodhi, a career officer, as the Pakistan Ambassador to the United States.

=== Minister of Food and Census in Sharif administration ===
After returning to Pakistan, Abida Hussain worked towards the agriculture, and sat in the opposition bench in the Parliament, and credited Sharif of agriculture revolution by introducing effective tube wells during the election campaign of Nawaz Sharif in 1997.

In 1994, she was implicated of receiving financial funding from the intelligence community, and testified in the case hearings in 2016 at the Supreme Court of Pakistan that "we (conservatives) were led to believe that it was an election fund for members of the government."

After successfully defending her constituency during the general elections held in 1997, Abida Hussain joined the second administration of Sharif as the Minister of Food and Agriculture and later becoming the Ministry of Population Control and Census. She was later rumored to be appointed in the United Nations as Permanent Representative of Pakistan but this appointment was never considered.

In 1998, she notably oversaw the successful and peaceful nationwide census in all over the country. When India conducted the nuclear tests in May 1998, Abida Hussain became one of the war hawk in the party, ultimately calling to break policy of deliberate ambiguity, and conduct the atomic tests in response to India. Over the Kargil front in 1999, she sided with Prime Minister Sharif, and ultimately suggesting to call for the meeting with the Chairman joint chiefs Gen. Pervez Musharraf over this issue.

After the military takeover of the federal government in 1999, Abida was imprisoned in Adiala Prison along with the leadership of the PML(N), and an inquiry was opened on her financial wealth that ultimately called her "a major defaulter."

Although, she was later released in 2002 with no inquiry actions taken against her. Abida Hussain later testified that the inquiries were drop due to her agreeing on a deal with the Musharraf administration to defect to the splinter faction under Shujaat Hussain, that would allow her to take participation in the general elections that were held in 2002. Despite agreeing on a deal with Musharraf's administration, she was disqualified to take further participation in general elections held in 2002, mainly due to failure to submit the proof of baccalaureate degree.

=== Political positions and views ===
Abida Hussain's political views reflects the fiscal conservatism on economic issues, and environmental conservatism on wildlife issues in her country, as she opposed to the issue of nationalization of corporate industry by the government as it did not suit well with the conservative industrialists. She also sided with Sharif's over many national security issues, and called for the civilian control of the military after 1999.

In 2002, Abida Hussain was disqualified from participating in the national politics by the Election Commission due to her lack of proof to submit the baccalaureate degree after the controversial new executive order signed by Musharraf. The new order eventually forced her to attend the university for the college degree to ensure the survival of her political career. In 2006, she conditionally agreed to join the Pakistan Peoples Party after disagreement arises with the PML(N) over the policy issues. In 2007, she harboured doubts on Musharraf' promises on giving security to Benazir Bhutto and reportedly Bhutto to avoid attending the political rally in National Park in Rawalpindi, which Bhutto attended and was assassinated. In 2008, Abida and her husband, Fakhar, reportedly lost the general election, and reportedly seek their retirement after Abida and Fakhar left the PPP in 2012.

During the general election, in 2013, Abida Hussain supported the PML-N candidate in Jhang by-elections, and ran her daughter's successful campaign to be elected for the Provincial Assembly of the Punjab on the platform of the PML(N). She reportedly quit the politics and currently overseeing the horse racing and breeding in her constituency. In 2016, she spoke very high of Nawaz Sharif, whom she considered to be self-made man and leader in politics, and paid tribute to Sharif for the services his done for his country's environment and agriculture.

== Bibliography ==
- Hussain, Syeda Abida (2015). Power Failure: The Political Odyssey of a Pakistani Woman (1st ed.). Karachi, Pakistan: Oxford University Press. p. 707. ISBN 9780199401574.
- Hussain, Syeda Abida (2007). Special Star: Benazir Bhutto's Story. Oxford University Press. ISBN 9780199407576.

== See also ==
- Democratic movements in Pakistan
  - Civilian control of the military
  - Civil-military relations
  - Khakistocracy
  - Movement to impeach Pervez Musharraf
  - General Musharraf vs. Federation of Pakistan, et.al.
- Post Cold War era
- Women in politics
- Pakistan Muslim League (N)

Diplomatic posts
Preceded by Najmuddin Shaikh	Pakistan Ambassador to the United States; November 1991 – March 1993	Succeeded by Maliha Lodhi
