= Khanewal =

Khanewal خانیوال (Punjabi)
- City
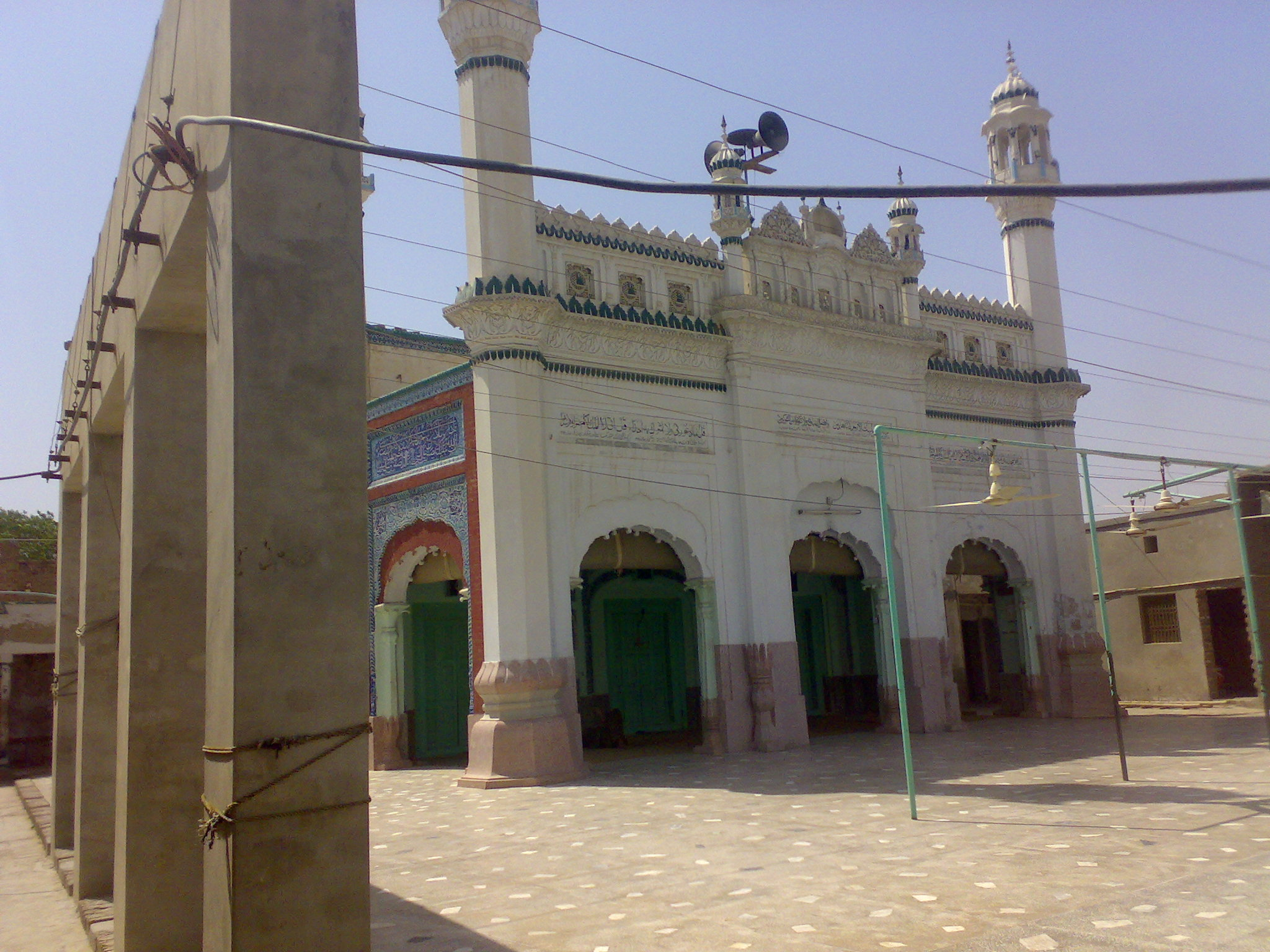

- Location within Punjab, Pakistan Location within Pakistan
- Coordinates: 30°18′N 71°56′E
- Country: Pakistan
- Province: (Punjab, Pakistan) Punjab
- Division: Multan
- District: Khanewal

Government
  - Type: Municipal Committee
  - Deputy Commissioner: Iftikhar Sherazi

Area
  - City: 243 km^{2} (94 sq mi)
- Elevation: 129 m (423 ft)

Population (2023)
  - City: 281,890
  - Rank: 33rd in Pakistan
  - Density: 1,150/km^{2} (3,000/sq mi)
- Time zone: UTC+5 (PST)
- Number of towns: 1
- Number of Union councils: 6

Khanewal (Note: Punjabi, Urdu: خانیوال) is a city and the capital of Khanewal District in Punjab, Pakistan. Khanewal also contains Khanewal Junction railway station, which is Pakistan's third largest railway junction. It is the 36th largest city of Pakistan by population.

== Etymology ==
According to one theory, Khanewal is named after the earliest settlers here who belonged to the Daha clan (a clan of Panwar Rajput) and used ‘Khan’ in their names. That is how the city came to be known as ‘khan-e-wal’ and later became Khanewal.

== History ==
Khanewal area was populated by Zayadat Khan, the forefather of the Daha family. It is said that he was originally from Dharwar but then migrated to Bahawalpur. After trying his luck in Bahawalpur, he moved to Pakpattan. Then in the 1820s, he moved to this region after getting employment under Dewan Sawan Mall. As an employee, he was made responsible for collection and payments from Talamba, Kamalia and Laden. He got famous in the region as Khan and thus this area was named Khanewala. This theory is also supported by an old book named Raesa e Punjab Page. As per that document, the first person to populate this region was Sangar Khan.

Sangar Khan was the 34th descendant of Tikkey Khan, the first Muslim in the Daha family. Sangar Khan is said to have moved to Khanewal (Khanewal Pakistan) from Pak Pattan. It is said that he built a castle in the area. The family lived here for a long time and Hasan Khan, the 37th descendant of Tikkey Khan, became one of the most prominent businessmen in the region. Hasan Khan was awarded Sanad by Pathan Government in 1768. According to this book, Khanewal was first populated in 1050 AD.

=== Mughal Era ===
The earliest settlers of the Khanewal were Daha and Khatters who use Khan in their names. Under the Mughal Era, the region of Khanewal was flourished and was notable for trade and commerce. After Mughal's decline, the Sikh Empire occupied the region, and Muslims faced many Sikh rule restrictions.

=== British Era ===
British rulers ruled the area till Pakistan's independence due to the junction of Khanewal-Wazirabad railway junction and considered British rulers’ well-planned town. Khanewal contained a population of Hindus and Sikhs who migrated to India after the partition. The people became Muslims dominantly due to missionary Sufi Saints.

It was declared a district in 1985 by taking two tehsils from District Multan, Kabirwala, and Mian Channu. The city is the capital of Khanewal District.

=== Early Development in Khanewal ===
In 1843, the British government in India decided to build railway tracks all over the country. An experimental train track was built from Bombay to Calcutta in 1843 which ended up being a huge success. In 1858 they approved a rail track connecting Multan-Lahore-Amritsar. Workers from all the villages rushed to get hired. After seven years of continuous work, the rail track finally opened on April 24, 1865. There were train stop stations all along the track connecting several cities and villages.

Khanewal was called Khanewalah at that time. The train track from Lahore to Multan was slightly arched upwards from Khanewal to Multan. Since most of the track was in a straight line and those were the early days of the train system, the railway department decided to build up a flag station at Khanewal, Punjab. Flag stations are smaller stations along a railway line where the train only stops if someone waves a flag.

Railway tracks were fascinating for locals all over India. People used to gather around the train tracks to see the train moving. With a flag station in Khanewal, people from all the surrounding villages started visiting khanewal just to see the train stop there for some time. That is when someone realized the opportunity and built the first inn (Dhaba) in Khanewal called the Railway Inn. It was built in 1860 and gradually became a prominent gathering point for people from the surrounding villages.

The railway's department initially allowed the locals to work on flag stations but this led to operational challenges. Therefore, they decided to hire trained staff from the United Kingdom and post them all over India to operate the railway network. Small quarters for British staff were built in Khanewalah in 1861. These British employees built the first graveyard in khanewal in 1865 which is still in its place and it is called Gora Qabarstan of Kohna Khanewal.

=== Subsequent Development in Khanewal ===
Subsequently, the British government decided to link Karachi to these major cities of Punjab. Multan railway station represented the lowest end of the northern railway system while Lodhran station was the highest station on the map for the southern railway line. However, later on, it was realized that the distance from Khanewal flag station to Lodhran (90 km) is shorter than Multan to Lodhran station (135 km). Therefore, keeping cost constraints and timeline in mind, it was decided to install a chord line from Khanewal to Lodhran as well.

Therefore, in 1874, more staff from the railway department was sent to stay in Khanewal and oversee the construction of the Khanewal Lodhran Chord line. In order to support the staff stationed in Khanewal, the railway department pushed the government to improve the area. As a consequence, the government opened two schools in Khanewal. First, Government Primary School # 6 was opened in early 1876 in Kohna Khanewal and then MC Primary School # 7B was opened. Since Khanewal would become a junction where the railway line from Lahore splits in two ways, Multan and Lodhran, the railway department decided to build a small station here in 1876. In order to support communications, a post and telegraph office was also built (current PTCL office) during the same year.

Work slowly continued and after 9 years in 1885, the Khanewal Lodhran Chord line became operational. Khanewal station became more important after getting the status of a junction. Moreover, the railway department needed more competent staff stationed here to make sure junction operations are properly managed. With the increase in economic activity, people from Kabirwala gradually started coming to Khanewal (still called Khanewalah among locals) for work. In 1886, a new separate post office was built in Khanewal Punjab.

After the success of the Khanewal Lodhran chord line in 1885, the railway department started working on the next phase to connect Layllpur (now called Faisalabad) with Khanewal. Work on another railway track from Khanewal to Layllpur was initiated in 1890 and on 4 April 1900, Khanewal-Toba Tek Singh was opened. This made Khanewal the biggest junction in India at that time. By this time the railway station of Khanewal was converted from a small flag station to a bigger developed station. It was one of the biggest stations in Northern India and was regarded highly with stations like Lahore, Multan and the Karachi Railway Station.

However, despite being a bigger railway station, the economic activity in the city was low. The city looked more like a desert with sand everywhere around it. The population of this region was only driven by the railway employees who lived on the Kohna Khanewal side of the railway track. Other than that, there was no agriculture or any economic activity in the area. There were no blocks, no civil lines, and no Gharibabad. All of it was sand dunes and it was still considered a small village that was a part of Kabirwala Tehsil. The people living in Kabirwala were still considered to have a higher social status than Khanewal.

=== Historical Event Timeline of Khanewal from 1712 to 1947 ===
Historical Event Timeline of Khanewal
| Year | Event Occurred |
|---|---|
| 1712 | Khan (Daha) tribe moves to Khanewal |
| 1820 | Khan family settles in Khanewal; First mosque of Khanewal (Jamia Masjid Kohna Khanewal) Built |
| 1858 | Rail track from Multan to Lahore built |
| 1860 | Railway inn built in Khanewal |
| 1865 | Khanewal was just a Flag Station; Gora Qabarstan built in Khanewal |
| 1876 | First School of Khanewal (Govt. Primary School # 6) built; Second School of Khanewal (MC Primary School # 7) built; Railway Station Khanewal inaugurated; Post and telegraph office Khanewal built. |
| 1886 | First separate Post Office Khanewal built in Kohna Khanewal |
| 1900 | Khanewal Railway Station Building completed; Jamia Masjid Kohna Khanewal rebuilt with bricks; Railway branch line from Khanewal to Laylpur opened. |
| 1901 | Khanewal was still part of Kabirwala Tehsil; Its name was Khanewalah |
| 1903 | Sham Muhammad Khan Daha (a famous politician of that era) awarded Sanad by the British Government |
| 1904 | Railway Colony Khanewal built; Locoshed quarters built; Railway Rest House made bigger; Canal Rest House built; Railway Waterworks built |
| 1906 | Digging for Lower Bari Doab Canal started; William Roberts (owner of RCA) was principal of Bombay College at this time |
| 1908 | Lower Bari Doab Canal Office and quarter built; |
| 1911 | Khanewal given status of a City; Sham Muhammad Khan Daha again awarded Sanad; First extension of Canal Office started |
| 1912 | Khanewal started developing; Allotment of plots in Khanewal started; First hospital of Khanewal (Railway hospital) built; First officer of Canal Office assigned to Khanewal; William Roberts of RCA became principal of Agriculture College of Faisalabad |
| 1913 | Lower Bari Doab Canal completed and inaugurated |
| 1916 | Water Works for Khanewal Built; Waste disposal point built near Gao Shala |
| 1917 | Khanewal given the status of Tehsil; Primary School # 3 started; MC Primary School # 2B built in locoshed; the Second mosque of Khanewal built in locoshed; Northern Western Railway shed built; Ghalla Mandi Built; Qulli Bazar was just made of dhabas at this time; Work started on Tehsil Office building; T-Chowk Water Works started; Police Stated – City Thana built; Civil Lines structured in plots |
| 1918 | Arya Samaj Mandir built; Gurdwara Singh Saba built |
| 1919 | Kulli bazar completed – Auction of shops started; Banson-wala bazar built; Building of tehsil office Khanewal complete; Tehsil police chowki built; Graves from this year can still be seen in Old Qabarstan |
| 1920 | 6 Lac acre land was allotted in Khanewal; Santan Dharam Mandir built in Chowk Sanglawala, Gurdwara Block # 4 built; Santan Dharam Mandir in Block 6 built; Jamia Masjid Gharibabad built; Gudrwara Bazar Built; Changar Muhalla populated; Muhalla Gharibabad populated; Civil Club Khanewal built; First Mela Moveshian in Khanewal |
| 1921 | NAC High School for Boys built; MC Primary School 1B built inside the NAC high School; NAC High School for Girls built; Nandi Anglo Vernacular High School opened; Population of Khanewal was 5,647 only; Reley Brother Cotton and Ginning Factory built; British Cotton and Ginning Association (BCGA) Factory was given 7,221 acre of land in Khanewal; William Roberts left Agricultural College of Faisalabad to build the BCGA Factory in Khanewal |
| 1922 | Chapel House (Girga Ghar) built in Khanewal; Land for Jamia Majid Block 11 bought |
| 1923 | British Cotton and Ginning Association Factory (BCGA) started operations |
| 1924 | Railway South Cabin opened in Khanewal; Extra Assistant Commissioner Court opened in Khanewal; SCO Canal Office Court opened; |
| 1925 | First admission in the NCA middle School; Jamia Masjid Block 11 built; Sikh Sabha library built in Block 3; Quarter Bhangian built; Gol Bagh built in Khanewal; New gate of Gurdwara Block 4 built from Machi Bazar; New design on Jamia Masjid Kohna Khanewal |
| 1926 | Municipal Library built in Khanewal; the First bank of Khanewal (Central Co-operative Bank) opened in Khanewal; Chaman Lal Cotton Factory built |
| 1927 | First admission in NAC high School for Boys |
| 1928 | First Electric House (Bijli ghar) built in Khanewal by Railway; 149 Pole lamps installed in Khanewal; Civil Veterinary Hospital built |
| 1929 | Khalsa High School built; Dharam Shala built in Lakar Mandi Khanewal; Hera Lal Petrol Agent started selling Petrol in Khanewal |
| 1930 | Kutiya Rehel-e-Hunood built; Cinema Radhu Palace built; NAC High School for Boys, NAC Middle School for Boys, Nandi Anglo Vernacular School moved to Government High School for Boys building; Post and Telegraph Office changed to Telephone Exchange Khanewal; |
| 1931 | Tuneja Cotton and Ginning Factory started operations in Khanewal; First map of Jamia Masjid Block 11 approved |
| 1932 | Kutiya Rehel-e-Hunood completed; Jamia Mosque Gharibabad built with solid brick |
| 1933 | Islamia High School building completed; Railway Police Station built; First printing press of Khanewal Jagdish Printing Press built |
| 1934 | William Roberts became member of Punjab Provincial Assembly |
| 1935 | Geerbat Ghat built in Khanewal; Jamia Masjid Ahlehadees built; Northern India Electric Supply came to Khanewal |
| 1936 | Work on Central Co-operative Bank building started; Hostel of Islamia High School built; William Roberts left Punjab Provincial Assembly |
| 1937 | Chistiya Bijli Ghar built; First petrol pump of Khanewal built (Prem Nath sub Agent Berma Shell Oil Company); Sarai Bhoja Ram built |
| 1939 | Foundation Stone of Central Co-operative bank laid |
| 1940 | First Amam Bargah of Khanewal built in Block 11; Markazi Jamia Masjid Ahlehadees foundation stone laid; Kacheri Bazar built; Sutesh Cotton Factory-built; 248 students in Government High School for Boys |
| 1941 | Second map of Jamia Masjid approved |
| 1942 | Markazi Jamia Masjid building work started; Anjuman Islamia Primary School built; Nani Anglo Vernacular Primary School given status of High School |
| 1945 | Doctor Bhutta opened Homeopathic Clinic in Khanewal; Police Choki moved from NAC High School for Girls to Block 4; Municipal Committee Office moved to Government Girls High School Hostel |
| 1946 | Land for Church in Khanewal purchased; Amam Bargah Block 11 expanded |
| 1947 | Khanewal became part of Pakistan; Municipal Library moved to Gerbatt Ghat; Sodagar Chand Hotel opened in Sarai Bhoja Ram; Post Office Khanewal moved to Block 4 House 60 |

== Geography ==
Historically The land where Khanewal is currently situated was barren originally and was called Gunji Bar or Kabirwala Bar. Bar is a geographical term used to describe elevated land on the sides of rivers. Initially, this area used to be the Southern shore of the river Ravi. At that time Ravi used to flow from east to west of Multan city. With the passage of time, the river kept changing its flow, the river soil turned this piece of land into vegetated land.

=== Climate ===
Climate data for Khanewal
| Month | Jan | Feb | Mar | Apr | May | Jun | Jul | Aug | Sep | Oct | Nov | Dec | Year |
|---|---|---|---|---|---|---|---|---|---|---|---|---|---|
| Record high °C (°F) | 28.3 (82.9) | 32.0 (89.6) | 39.0 (102.2) | 45.0 (113.0) | 46.9 (116.4) | 49.0 (120.2) | 49.2 (120.6) | 45.0 (113.0) | 42.5 (108.5) | 40.6 (105.1) | 36.0 (96.8) | 29.0 (84.2) | 49.2 (120.6) |
| Mean daily maximum °C (°F) | 21.0 (69.8) | 23.2 (73.8) | 28.5 (83.3) | 35.5 (95.9) | 40.4 (104.7) | 42.3 (108.1) | 39.2 (102.6) | 38.0 (100.4) | 37.2 (99.0) | 34.6 (94.3) | 28.5 (83.3) | 22.7 (72.9) | 32.6 (90.7) |
| Daily mean °C (°F) | 12.7 (54.9) | 15.4 (59.7) | 21.0 (69.8) | 27.5 (81.5) | 32.4 (90.3) | 35.5 (95.9) | 33.9 (93.0) | 33.0 (91.4) | 31.0 (87.8) | 26.4 (79.5) | 19.7 (67.5) | 14.1 (57.4) | 25.2 (77.4) |
| Mean daily minimum °C (°F) | 4.5 (40.1) | 7.6 (45.7) | 13.5 (56.3) | 19.5 (67.1) | 24.4 (75.9) | 28.6 (83.5) | 28.7 (83.7) | 28.0 (82.4) | 24.9 (76.8) | 18.2 (64.8) | 10.9 (51.6) | 5.5 (41.9) | 17.9 (64.1) |
| Record low °C (°F) | −2.2 (28.0) | −1 (30) | 3.3 (37.9) | 9.4 (48.9) | 13.5 (56.3) | 20.0 (68.0) | 21.1 (70.0) | 21.1 (70.0) | 16.7 (62.1) | 8.9 (48.0) | 0.6 (33.1) | −1.1 (30.0) | −2.2 (28.0) |
| Average precipitation mm (inches) | 7.2 (0.28) | 9.5 (0.37) | 19.5 (0.77) | 12.9 (0.51) | 9.8 (0.39) | 12.3 (0.48) | 61.3 (2.41) | 32.6 (1.28) | 10.8 (0.43) | 1.7 (0.07) | 2.3 (0.09) | 6.9 (0.27) | 186.8 (7.35) |
| Mean monthly sunshine hours | 222.3 | 211.6 | 250.8 | 273.3 | 293.5 | 266.8 | 265.0 | 277.6 | 277.6 | 274.9 | 255.0 | 229.2 | 3,097.6 |
Source: NOAA (1961–1990)

== Demographics ==
Population

Historical population

| Year | Pop. | ±% p.a. |
|---|---|---|
| 1951 | 37,915 | — |
| 1961 | 49,093 | +2.62% |
| 1972 | 67,746 | +2.97% |
| 1981 | 89,090 | +3.09% |

| Year | Pop. | ±% p.a. |
|---|---|---|
| 1998 | 133,986 | +2.43% |
| 2017 | 227,059 | +2.82% |
| 2023 | 281,890 | +3.67% |

According to 2023 census, Khanewal had a population of 281,890. The population of Khanewal district was 2,068,000 in the 1998 Census. In the 2005 Economic Survey the population was reported at 2,376,000 with a growth rate of 2.4%. In 2015 the population of Khanewal was estimated to be 2,941,000.

Languages

Languages of Khanewal MC(2023)
1. Punjabi (54.4%)
2. Urdu (37.3%)
3. Saraiki (7.40%)
4. Others (0.90%)

According to the census of 2023, Punjabi is the most widely spoken first language of Khanewal, accounting for 54.4% of the population. Urdu was the native language of 37.3%, Saraiki of 7.4% and 0.9% others.

== Education ==
The education system in Khanewal is formulated along specific modern, religious, cultural, social, psychological, commerce and scientific injunctions. The current literacy rate of khanewal is 39.9%. The standard national system of education is mainly inspired from the British system. The system also aims to imbibe a secular outlook among the students with the awareness of the rich cultural heritage of Pakistan. Khanewal has a wide range of schools, colleges and universities that caters to diverse streams.

The system is divided into five levels: primary (grades one through five); middle (grades six through eight); high (grades nine and ten, leading to the Secondary School Certificate); intermediate (grades eleven and twelve, leading to a Higher Secondary School Certificate); and university programs leading to graduate and advanced degrees.

Khanewal, like majority of the cities in Pakistan has both public and private educational institutions from primary to university level. Most educational institutions are gender based from primary to university level.

All academic education institutions are the responsibility of the provincial governments. The federal government mostly assists in curriculum development, accreditation and some financing of research.

=== Universities in Khanewal ===
- University College of Management and Sciences (UCMS) - Khanewal
- Virtual University of Pakistan

== Notable people ==
- Shabbir Ahmad Pakistani Test Cricketer
- Iftikhar Anjum, Pakistani cricketer
- Muhammad Khan Daha, (Member National Assembly of Pakistan)
- Nishat Khan Daha, (Member Punjab Provincial Assembly)
- Ahmed Faheem, footballer
- Tasawar Hayat, Mathematician
- Syed Fakhar Imam, Ex. Speaker National Assembly of Pakistan
- Arshad Nadeem, Olympic athlete (Javelin throw)

== See also ==
- Khanewal Junction railway station
