= NA-145 Khanewal-II =

Constituency of the National Assembly of Pakistan

- Constituency for the National Assembly of Pakistan
- Region: Khanewal Tehsil (partly) including Khanewal City and Kabirwala Tehsil (partly) of Khanewal District
- Electorate: 461,408

Current constituency
- Party: Pakistan Muslim League (N)
- Member: Muhammad Khan Daha
- Created from: NA-157 Khanewal-II

NA-145 Khanewal-II (این اے-145، خانیوال-۲) is a constituency for the National Assembly of Pakistan.

== Election 2002 ==
General elections were held on 10 October 2002. Hamid Yar Hiraj an independent candidate won by 74,905 votes.

General election 2002: NA-157 Khanewal-II
| Party | Candidate | Votes | % | ±% |
|---|---|---|---|---|
| PML(Q) | Hamid Yar Hiraj | 74,905 | 53.51 | |
| PML(N) | Razwan Ahmed Khan Daha | 52,517 | 37.51 | |
| MMA | Sahibzada Muhammad Aziz-Ur-Rehman Hamdi | 12,572 | 8.98 | |
| Turnout | | 142,578 | 46.90 | |
| Total valid votes | | 139,994 | 98.19 | |
| Rejected ballots | | 2,584 | 1.81 | |
| Majority | | 22,388 | 16.00 | |
| Registered electors | | 303,984 | | |

== Election 2008 ==
General elections were held on 18 February 2008. Hamid Yar Hiraj of PML-Q won by 58,819 votes.

General election 2008: NA-157 Khanewal-II
| Party | Candidate | Votes | % | ±% |
|---|---|---|---|---|
| PML(Q) | Hamid Yar Hiraj | 58,819 | 42.76 | |
| PML(N) | Muhammad Khan Daha | 58,231 | 42.34 | |
| PPP | Syed Faisal Imam | 19,756 | 14.36 | |
| Independent | Sohail Sikandar Khan Daha | 761 | 0.54 | |
| Turnout | | 142,243 | 52.97 | |
| Total valid votes | | 137,567 | 96.71 | |
| Rejected ballots | | 4,676 | 3.29 | |
| Majority | | 588 | 0.42 | |
| Registered electors | | 268,515 | | |
| PML(Q) gain from Independent | | | | |

== Election 2013 ==
General elections were held on 11 May 2013. Muhammad Khan Daha of PML-N won by 96,162 votes and became the member of National Assembly.

General election 2013: NA-157 Khanewal-II
| Party | Candidate | Votes | % | ±% |
|---|---|---|---|---|
| PML(N) | Muhammad Khan Daha | 96,162 | 48.53 | |
| PML(Q) | Hamid Yar Hiraj | 65,407 | 33.01 | |
| PTI | Abid Mahmood | 27,842 | 14.05 | |
| Others | Others (seven candidates) | 8,744 | 4.41 | |
| Turnout | | 203,409 | 60.81 | |
| Total valid votes | | 198,155 | 97.42 | |
| Rejected ballots | | 5,254 | 2.58 | |
| Majority | | 30,755 | 15.52 | |
| Registered electors | | 334,495 | | |
| PML(N) gain from PPP | | | | |

== Election 2018 ==
General elections were held on 25 July 2018.

General election 2018: NA-151 Khanewal-II
| Party | Candidate | Votes | % | ±% |
|---|---|---|---|---|
| PML(N) | Muhammad Khan Daha | 111,325 | 47.53 | |
| PTI | Ahmad Yar Hiraj | 109,796 | 46.89 | |
| TLP | Muhammad Amir Sohail | 8,987 | 3.84 | |
| AAT | Badar Muhammad Chaudry | 2,173 | 0.93 | |
| PRHP | Muhammad Akram | 1,412 | 0.60 | |
| Independent | Abid Mehmmod | 368 | 0.16 | |
| Independent | Muhammad Umar Draz Khalid | 115 | 0.05 | |
| Turnout | | 237,802 | 58.72 | |
| Total valid votes | | 234,176 | 98.48 | |
| Rejected ballots | | 3,626 | 1.52 | |
| Majority | | 1,529 | 0.65 | |
| Registered electors | | 404,946 | | |

== Election 2024 ==
General elections were held on 8 February 2024. Muhammad Khan Daha won the election with 102,952 votes.

General election 2024: NA-145 Khanewal-II
| Party | Candidate | Votes | % | ±% |
|---|---|---|---|---|
| PML(N) | Muhammad Khan Daha | 102,952 | 42.52 | ▼5.01 |
| PTI | Abid Mahmood (Note: Filed nomination papers as PTI candidate but ECP allowed him to run as an independent) | 56,217 | 23.22 | ▼23.67 |
| Independent | Hamid Yar Hiraj | 53,132 | 21.95 | |
| TLP | Muhammad Wakeel | 14,766 | 6.10 | ▲2.26 |
| PPP | Rana Abdul Rehman Khan | 10,583 | 4.37 | |
| Others | Others (nine candidates) | 4,457 | 1.84 | |
| Turnout | | 247,263 | 53.59 | ▼5.13 |
| Total valid votes | | 242,107 | 97.91 | |
| Rejected ballots | | 5,156 | 2.09 | |
| Majority | | 46,735 | 19.30 | ▲18.65 |
| Registered electors | | 461,408 | | |

== See also ==
- NA-144 Khanewal-I
- NA-146 Khanewal-III
