= PP-207 Khanewal-III =

Constituency of the Punjabi Provincial Legislature, Pakistan

- Constituency for the Provincial Assembly of Punjab
- Region: Mian Channu Tehsil (partly) including Tulamba town of Khanewal District

Current constituency
- Created from: PP-216 Khanewal-V (2002-2018); PP-207 Khanewal-V (2018-2023)

PP-207 Khanewal-III (پی پی-207، خانیوال-3) is a Constituency of Provincial Assembly of Punjab.

== General elections 2024 ==
Provincial election 2024: PP-207 Khanewal-III
Party	Candidate	Votes	%	±%
PML(N)	Amir Hayat Hiraj	60,418	42.03	
Independent	Syed Abbas Ali Shah (Note: Filed nomination papers as PTI candidate but ECP allowed him to run as an independent)	58,840	40.93	
TLP	Muhammad Nadeem	6,470	4.50	
PPP	Muhammad Imran Haider	6,365	4.43	
Independent	Kanwar Tahseen Ashraf	5,933	4.13	
Others	Others (eleven candidates)	5,734	3.98	
Turnout		147,140	54.25	
Total valid votes		143,760	97.70	
Rejected ballots		3,380	2.30	
Majority		1,578	1.10	
Registered electors		271,225		
hold				

== General elections 2018 ==
Provincial election 2018: PP-207 Khanewal-V
Party	Candidate	Votes	%	±%
PTI	Syed Abbas Ali Shah	43,227	38.26	
PML(N)	Amir Hayat Hiraj	40,341	35.71	
Independent	Pervaiz Akhtar	19,234	17.03	
PPP	Muhammad Imran Haider	5,422	4.80	
TLP	Muzaffar Hussain	2,929	2.59	
Others	Others (eight candidates)	1,821	1.61	
Turnout		115,851	58.60	
Total valid votes		112,974	97.52	
Rejected ballots		2,877	2.48	
Majority		2,886	2.55	
Registered electors		197,701		

== General elections 2013 ==
Provincial election 2013: PP-216 Khanewal-V
Party	Candidate	Votes	%	±%
PML(N)	Amir Hayat Hiraj	34,208	39.98	
PTI	Sayyad Abbas Ali Shah	21,577	25.22	
Independent	Shahzad Khakwani	11,076	12.94	
PPP	Mahar Muhammad Imran Haider Sanpal	10,855	12.69	
Independent	Muhammad Afzal Khan Dullu	2,466	2.88	
MQM-P	Shamoon Kesar Bhatti	1,842	2.15	
Independent	Muhammad Ashraf	1,443	1.69	
Others	Others (nine candidates)	2,097	2.45	
Turnout		89,121	62.24	
Total valid votes		85,564	96.01	
Rejected ballots		3,557	3.99	
Majority		12,631	14.76	
Registered electors		143,178		

== General elections 2008 ==
Contesting candidates	Party affiliation	Votes polled

== See also ==
- PP-206 Khanewal-II
- PP-208 Khanewal-IV
