= Tasawar Hayat =

Pakistani mathematician

- تصور حیات
- Born: Tasawar Hayat; 1 January 1969 (age 57); Khanewal
- Citizenship: Pakistan
- Education: Quaid-i-Azam University, Islamabad
- Scientific career
- Workplaces: Quaid-i-Azam University, Islamabad
- Website: https://math.qau.edu.pk/faculty/dr-tasawar-hayat/

Tasawar Hayat (born 1 January 1969) is a Pakistani mathematician who is a Professor of Mathematics at the Quaid-i-Azam University. He is known for his work in the area of mathematical fluid mechanics.

== Biography ==
Born in Khanewal, Hayat received his early education from there. He is an alumnus of University of Islamabad, better known as Quaid-i-Azam University, where he received BSc in mathematics in 1988. With his bachelor's degree, he secured a silver medal awarded by the university's board of graduation. He completed his M.Phil. in 1994, followed by the MSc in mathematics in 1992 and a PhD in mathematics, under the supervision of Saleem Asghar in 1999 from the same institution.

Having joined Quaid-i-Azam University as a junior research assistant, Hayat engaged his research in wave mechanics, Fluid mechanics, and non-Newtonian fluid mechanics. He became a senior research assistant in 1995, and a lecturer in mathematics in 1998. In 2001, he went to Germany where he became an AVH Fellow at the Technische Universität Darmstadt.

After completing his research, Hayat returned to Pakistan, where he joined his alma mater to become an assistant professor of mathematical sciences. In 2005, he was promoted as an associate professor in mathematics department of Quaid-i-Azam University (QAU) and, in 2007, had promoted as a distinguished HEC National Professor.

His research is engaged to the fields of wave motion, acoustic, electromagnetic and elastic waves, fluid mechanics, relativity, and biomechanics. At QAU, he is a distinguished member of Fluid Mechanics Group, where he is currently supervising the postgraduate studies.

== Awards and recognition ==
- Fellow of The World Academy of Sciences (2010)
