= Nishat Khan Daha =

Pakistani politician (1948–2021)

Member of the Provincial Assembly of the Punjab
- In office 2 May 2008 – 23 October 2021
- In office 20 July 2005 – 2 May 2008

Personal details
- Born: 15 January 1948 Khanewal, Pakistan
- Died: 23 October 2021 (aged 73) Khanewal, Pakistan
- Cause of death: Protracted illness
- Party: Pakistan Muslim League (N)

Punjab Assembly Lahore

Nishat Ahmad Khan Daha (15 January 1948 – 23 October 2021) was a Pakistani politician, businessman and an agriculturist from District Khanewal of the Punjab.

== Early life ==
Nishat Ahmad Khan Daha belonged to a Political Daha Family and was born to Khan Hazarey Khan Daha, an agriculturist and a businessman, on 15 January 1948 in Khanewal. The Daha Rajputs are the earliest settlers of Khanewal, therefore the name of Khanewal is due to "Daha Rajput" family because they used ‘Khan’ in their names. Khanewal is named after the earliest settlers here who belonged to the caste "Daha Rajput" caste and used ‘Khan’ in their names. That is how the city came to be known as ‘khan-e-wal’.

He did his F.A. from Forman Christian College Lahore in 1964 and graduated in 1969 from the University of Sargodha and has the degree of Bachelor in Arts.

== Political career ==
Daha started his career in local politics. He was first elected as Chairman Khanewal unopposed from 1987 to 1993, then again as Tehsil Nazim Khanewal from 2001 to 2005. In both terms he contested as an Independent candidate. He was elected to the Provincial Assembly of the Punjab as a candidate of Pakistan Peoples Party from Constituency PP-214 (Khanewal-III) in 2008 Pakistani general election. He received 44,525 votes and defeated a candidate of Pakistan Muslim League (Q). During his tenure as Member of the Punjab Assembly, he served as Parliamentary Secretary for Mines and Minerals from 2009 to 2011.

He was re-elected to the Provincial Assembly of the Punjab as a candidate of Pakistan Muslim League (N) (PML-N) from Constituency PP-214 (Khanewal-III) in the 2013 Pakistani general election.

He was re-elected to Provincial Assembly of the Punjab as a candidate of PML-N from Constituency PP-206 (Khanewal-IV) in the 2018 Pakistani general election.

He had travelled to UK, USA, China, Thailand and Malaysia.

His elder brother, Zahoor Ahmad Khan Daha (1938-2006) contested election successfully in 2002 as an independent candidate and later on joined Pakistan Muslim League (Q) and served as Member of Punjab Assembly during 2002-06 and also functioned as Parliamentary Secretary for Finance during 2003–06. He studied from London, UK and was also a Chartered Accountant.

Another relative of his, Haji Irfan Ahmad Khan Daha, served as Member, Provincial Assembly of the Punjab for four consecutive terms during 1988–90, 1990–93, 1993–96, 1997-98 and also functioned as Parliamentary Secretary for Finance during 1990-93 and as Minister for Transport during 1997–98.

His uncle, Major (R) Aftab Ahmad Khan Daha (1924-2005) remained Member of National Assembly for four consecutive terms during 1988–90, 1990–93, 1993–96 and 1997–99 and also functioned as Parliamentary Secretary for Information.

Another relative, Muhammad Iqbal Rais Khan Daha, served as Member, Provincial Assembly of the Punjab from 2002 to 2007 and also functioned as Chairman, Standing Committee on Mines & Minerals on 5 September 2003.

Muhammad Khan Daha, son of Haji Irfan Ahmad Khan Daha, ran for the seat of the National Assembly of Pakistan as a candidate of Pakistan Muslim League (N) (PML-N) from Constituency NA-157 (Khanewal-II) in the 2008 Pakistani general election but was unsuccessful. He received 58,231 votes and lost the seat to Hamid Yar Hiraj. He was elected to the National Assembly as a candidate of PML-N from Constituency NA-157 (Khanewal-II) in 2013 Pakistani general election. He was re-elected to the National Assembly as a candidate of PML-N from Constituency NA-151 (Khanewal-II) in 2018 Pakistani general election.

Masood Majeed Khan Daha, nephew of Nishat Ahmad Khan Daha previously served as Chairman Municipal Committee Khanewal from 2015 to 2020. He was elected as Chairman unopposed from the Platform of Pakistan Muslim League-N. As on 2023, Masood Daha has joined Pakistan Peoples Party.

Taimur Khan Daha, son of Haji Rizwan Ahmad Khan Daha served as Vice-Chairman Zila Council Khanewal from 2015 to 2020.
