= Syed Abbas Ali Shah =

Pakistani politician

Member of the Provincial Assembly of the Punjab
- In office 15 August 2018 – 14 January 2023
- Constituency: PP-207 Khanewal-V

Personal details
- Party: PTI (2018-present)

Syed Abbas Ali Shah is a Pakistani politician who had been a member of the Provincial Assembly of the Punjab from August 2018 till January 2023.

Syed Abbas Ali Shah has completed his highschool from Aitchison College, Lahore. He has been politically active for quite a while and is the parliamentary secretary for law and parliamentary affairs.

== Political career ==
He was elected to the Provincial Assembly of the Punjab as a candidate of Pakistan Tehreek-e-Insaf from Constituency PP-207 (Khanewal-V) in the 2018 Pakistani general election.
