= Sughra Imam =

Pakistani politician

Minister for Social Welfare
- In office 24 November 2003 – 18 June 2004

Personal details
- Born: 14 November 1972 (age 53) Lahore, Pakistan
- Other political affiliations: Pakistan Peoples Party
- Parent(s): Syed Fakhar Imam and Syeda Abida Hussain

Syeda Sughra Imam (Punjabi, Urdu: سیدہ صغرہ امام) is a Pakistani politician who was elected from the platform of the Pakistan Peoples Partyserved from Punjab on a reserve seat for women.

== Early life and education ==
Syeda Sughra Imam belongs to a political family. She is the daughter of two politicians, Syed Fakhar Imam and Syeda Abida Hussain. She was born on November 14, 1972, in Lahore.

== Political career ==
After graduation, she worked at the US based foreign policy think tank, the Council on Foreign Relations, New York City, and as a consultant to the United Nations Development Programme and other NGOs. She served as chairperson, Zila Council, Jhang during 1998-99, and has been elected as Member Provincial Assembly of the Punjab in General Elections 2002. She elected both times by joining the Pakistan Peoples Party.
