= PP-205 Khanewal-I =

Constituency of the Punjabi Provincial Legislature, Pakistan

- Constituency for the Provincial Assembly of Punjab
- Region: Kabirwala Tehsil (partly) including Sarai Sidhu Town of Khanewal District

Current constituency
- Created from: PP-212 Khanewal-I (2002-2018); PP-203 Khanewal-I (2018-2023)

PP-205 Khanewal-I (پی پی-205، خانیوال-1) is a constituency of the Provincial Assembly of Punjab.

== General elections 2024 ==
Provincial elections for the Punjab Assembly were held on 8 February 2024. Muhammad Akbar Hayat Hiraj, an independent candidate, won from PP-205 Khanewal-I by 63,154 votes, while Syed Khawar Ali Shah was the runner-up with 40,725 votes.

Provincial election 2024: PP-205 Khanewal-I
Party	Candidate	Votes	%	±%
Independent	Muhammad Akbar Hayat Hiraj	63,154	45.26	
Independent	Syed Khawar Ali Shah	40,725	29.18	
PML(N)	Syed Muhammad Murtaza Hussain	22,665	16.24	
Independent	Muhammad Abdullah Nawaz Merah (Note: Filed nomination papers as PTI candidate but ECP allowed him to run as an Independent)	9,040	6.48	
TLP	Shahbaz Hussain	2,031	1.46	
Others	Others (eight candidates)	1,930	1.38	
Turnout		143,532	61.15	
Total valid votes		139,545	97.22	
Rejected ballots		3,987	2.78	
Majority		22,429	16.08	
Registered electors		234,719		
hold				

== General elections 2018 ==
Provincial elections for the Punjab Assembly were held on July 25, 2018.Syed Khawar Ali Shah, an independent candidate, won from PP-203 Khanewal-I by 48,672 votes, while Muhammad Akbar Hayat Hiraj, contesting from Pakistan Tehreek-e-Insaf, was the runner-up with 47,267 votes.

Provincial election 2018: PP-203 Khanewal-I
Party	Candidate	Votes	%	±%
Independent	Syed Khawar Ali Shah	48,672	43.95	
PTI	Muhammad Akbar Hayat Haraj	47,267	42.68	
PML(N)	Syed Muhammad Murtaza Hussain	9,309	8.41	
Independent	Zahoor Ahmad	1,585	1.43	
PPP	Jaffar Hussain	1,379	1.25	
AAT	Muhammad Saleem Akhtar Shad	1,156	1.04	
Others	Others (four candidates)	1,368	1.23	
Turnout		113,598	62.15	
Total valid votes		110,736	97.48	
Rejected ballots		2,862	2.52	
Majority		1,405	1.27	
Registered electors		182,793		

== General elections 2013 ==
Provincial elections for the Punjab Assembly were held on 11 May 2013. Muhammad Akbar Hayat Hiraj, an independent candidate, won from PP-212 Khanewal-I by 39,156 votes, while Syed Mukhtar Hussain Shah was the runner-up with 31,770 votes.

Provincial election 2013: PP-212 Khanewal-I
Party	Candidate	Votes	%	±%
Independent	Muhammad Akbar Hayat Harraj	39,156	40.78	
PML(N)	Syed Mukhtar Hussain Shah	31,770	33.09	
PTI	Syed Muhammad Nasir Ali Shah	12,708	13.24	
MDM	Zahore Ahamd	4,871	5.07	
Independent	Mehmood Ali	4,191	4.36	
Independent	Syed Ali Akbar Shah	1,601	1.67	
Others	Others (twelve candidates)	1,721	1.79	
Turnout		100,515	64.70	
Total valid votes		96,018	95.53	
Rejected ballots		4,497	4.47	
Majority		7,386	7.69	
Registered electors		155,360		

== General elections 2008 ==
Contesting candidates	Party affiliation	Votes polled

== See also ==
- PP-204 Sahiwal-VII
- PP-206 Khanewal-II
