= NA-144 Khanewal-I =

Constituency of the National Assembly of Pakistan

- Constituency for the National Assembly of Pakistan
- Region: Kabirwala Tehsil (partly) including Kabirwala city of Khanewal District
- Electorate: 463,649

Current constituency
- Party: Pakistan Muslim League (N)
- Member: Raza Hayat Hiraj
- Created from: NA-156 Khanewal-I

NA-144 Khanewal-I (این اے-144، خانیوال-۱) is a constituency for the National Assembly of Pakistan.

== Election 2002 ==
General elections were held on 10 October 2002. Raza Hayat Hiraj of PPP won by 86,438 votes.

General election 2002: NA-156 Khanewal-I
Party	Candidate	Votes	%	±%
PPP	Raza Hayat Hiraj	86,438	57.27	
PML(Q)	Syed Fakhar Imam	59,637	39.51	
Others	Others (three candidates)	4,865	3.22	
Turnout		153,988	52.91	
Total valid votes		150,940	98.02	
Rejected ballots		3,048	1.98	
Majority		26,801	17.76	
Registered electors		291,062		

== Election 2008 ==
General elections were held on 18 February 2008. Raza Hayat Hiraj of PML-Q won by 71,381 votes.

General election 2008: NA-156 Khanewal-I
Party	Candidate	Votes	%	±%
PML(Q)	Raza Hayat Hiraj	71,381	48.44	
PPP	Syed Fakhar Imam	58,271	39.54	
PML(N)	Syed Khawar Ali Shah	12,911	8.76	
Others	Others (four candidates)	4,799	3.26	
Turnout		151,216	61.08	
Total valid votes		147,362	97.45	
Rejected ballots		3,854	2.55	
Majority		13,110	8.90	
Registered electors		247,583		
PML(Q) gain from PPP				

== Election 2013 ==
General elections were held on 11 May 2013. Raza Hayat Hiraj won by 79,695 votes as independent candidate and became the member of National Assembly, latter, he joined PML-N.

General election 2013: NA-156 Khanewal-I
Party	Candidate	Votes	%	±%
Independent	Raza Hayat Hiraj	80,179	42.65	
PML(N)	Syed Fakhar Imam	69,749	37.11	
PTI	Syed Khawar Ali Shah	20,837	11.09	
MDM	Abdul Khaliq Rehmani	13,598	7.23	
Others	Others (ten candidates)	3,614	1.92	
Turnout		195,564	62.18	
Total valid votes		187,977	96.12	
Rejected ballots		7,587	3.88	
Majority		10,430	5.54	
Registered electors		314,492		
Independent gain from PML(Q)				

== Election 2018 ==
This analysis provides a detailed overview of the NA-150 Khanewal-I election results for 2018. Syed Fakhar Imam won by 101,520 votes as an independent candidate and became a member of the National Assembly. Later, he joined PTI.

General election 2018: NA-150 Khanewal-I
Party	Candidate	Votes	%	±%
Independent	Syed Fakhar Imam	101,520	45.54	
PTI	Raza Hayat Hiraj	92,039	41.36	
PML(N)	Saeed Sargana	18,116	8.13	
Independent	Abdul Khaliq Rehmani	5,557	2.49	
PPP	Ijaz Ahmed Khan	4,517	2.03	
Independent	Muhammad Khawar Tasaduq	446	0.20	
Independent	Rana Muhammad Imran	443	0.20	
Independent	Abdul Majeed Anwar	188	0.08	
Turnout		228,358	59.99	
Total valid votes		222,846	58.52	
Rejected ballots		5,512	2.48	
Majority		9,481	4.26	
Registered electors		380,605		

== Election 2024 ==
This analysis provides a detailed overview of the NA-144 Khanewal-I election results for 2024, highlighting the vote share of each candidate, changes from the previous election, turnout statistics, and the majority percentage. Raza Hayat Hiraj won the election with 119,133 votes.

General election 2024: NA-144 Khanewal-I
Party	Candidate	Votes	%	±%
PML(N)	Raza Hayat Hiraj	119,133	44.83	
Independent	Syed Abid Hussain Imam	78,384	29.50	
PML(Q)	Syed Muhammad Mukhtar Hussain	28,838	10.85	▲2.72
Independent	Muhammad Ahsan	22,049	8.30	
PPP	Muhammad Zaman	7,330	2.76	▲0.73
TLP	Muhammad Mushtaq	4,826	1.82	
IPP	Syed Fakhar Imam	1,016	0.38	▼45.16
Independent	Aamir Raza	990	0.37	
PTI	Shahbaz Ahmad Khan (Note: Filed nomination papers as PTI candidate but ECP allowed him to run as an Independent)	839	0.32	▼41.04
JI	Manzoor Hussain	818	0.31	
PMML	Abdul Rauf	498	0.19	
Independent	Sultan Ahmad	457	0.17	
PRHP	Abdul Khaliq Rehmani	279	0.10	
Independent	Irfan Ahmad	260	0.09	
Turnout		273,749	59.04	▼0.96
Total valid votes		265,717	97.07	
Rejected ballots		8,032	2.93	
Majority		40,749	15.34	
Registered electors		463,649		

== See also ==
- NA-143 Sahiwal-III
- NA-145 Khanewal-II
