= Hamid Yar Hiraj =

Pakistani politician

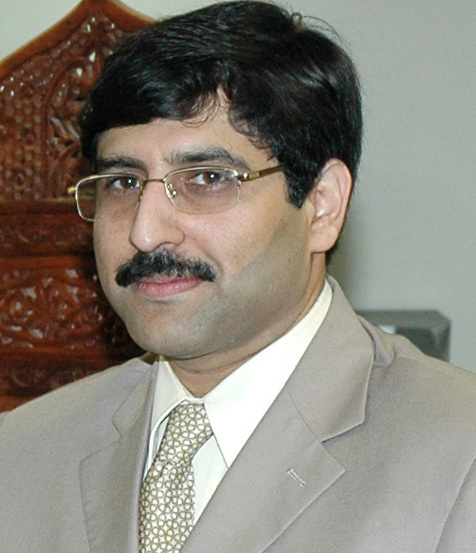

Member of the Provincial Assembly of the Punjab
- In office 2018–2023
- Constituency: PP-205 Khanewal-III

Member of the National Assembly of Pakistan
- In office 2002–2013
- Constituency: NA-157 (Khanewal-II)

Personal details
- Party: TLP (2025-present)
- Other political affiliations: PTI (2016–2023); PML(Q) (2008-2013)

Hamid Yar Hiraj is a Pakistani politician who had been a member of the National Assembly of Pakistan from 2002 to 2013. He also served as Member of the Provincial Assembly of the Punjab from August 2018 to January 2023.

== Early life and education ==
He was born on 10 December 1972.

He received his BSc and MSc degrees from the University of Pennsylvania in 1995 and an MA degree in legal studies from Columbia University USA in 1999.

== Political career ==
He was elected to the National Assembly of Pakistan from Constituency NA-157 (Khanewal-II) as an independent candidate in the 2002 Pakistani general election. He received 74,905 votes and defeated Rizwan Ahmad Khan Daha, a candidate of Pakistan Muslim League (N) (PML-N). In November 2002, he was inducted into the federal cabinet of Prime Minister Mir Zafarullah Khan Jamali and was appointed Minister of State for Health where he continued to serve until June 2004. In June 2004, he was inducted into the federal cabinet of Prime Minister Shaukat Aziz and was appointed Minister of State for Commerce and Trade where he served until the completion of the government's tenure in November 2007.

He was re-elected to the National Assembly from Constituency NA-157 (Khanewal-II) as a candidate of Pakistan Muslim League (Q) (PML-Q) in the 2008 Pakistani general election. He received 58,819 votes and defeated PMLN-N candidate Muhammad Khan Daha. On 22 November 2010, Sardar Hamid Yar Hiraj was appointed a Federal Minister, Chairman Earthquake Reconstruction & Rehabilitation Authority (ERRA), by Prime Minister Syed Yousuf Raza Gillani. He served at the post until the completion of the government's tenure in March 2013.

He ran for the seat of the National Assembly from Constituency NA-157 (Khanewal-II) as a candidate of (PML-Q) in the 2013 Pakistani general election but was unsuccessful. He received 65,407 votes and lost the seat to Muhammad Khan Daha.

After the 2013 general election, he quit PML-Q and later joined Pakistan Tehreek-e-Insaf on 20 October 2016.

He was elected as a member of the Provincial Assembly of the Punjab as a candidate of Pakistan Tehreek-e-Insaf (PTI) from Constituency PP-205 (Khanewal-III) in the 2018 Pakistani general election. He received 57,203 votes and defeated PML-N candidate Ch Fazal ur Rehman.
