= Julius Salik =

Pakistani minority rights activist

Julius Salik also known as J. Salik, is a Pakistani Christian and activist for minority rights based in Islamabad. In 1996, he founded the World Minorities Alliance to advocate for the social status of minorities, initially religious minorities in Pakistan – including Buddhism, Christians, Hindus, and Sikhs. That same year, he was nominated by Prime Minister Benazir Bhutto for the Nobel Peace Prize.
