= PP-206 Khanewal-II =

Constituency of the Punjabi Provincial Legislature, Pakistan

- Constituency for the Provincial Assembly of Punjab
- Region: Kabirwala Tehsil (partly) including Abdul Hakeem town and Khanewal Tehsil (partly) of Khanewal District

Current constituency
- Created from: PP-215 Khanewal-IV (2002-2018); PP-205 Khanewal-III (2018-2023)

PP-206 Khanewal-II (پی پی-206، خانیوال-2) is a Constituency of Provincial Assembly of Punjab.

== General elections 2024 ==
Provincial election 2024: PP-206 Khanewal-II
Party	Candidate	Votes	%	±%
PML(N)	Usama Fazal	46,806	36.57	
Independent	Ahmad Yar Hiraj	39,130	30.57	
Independent	Syed Muhammad Hasnain Shah (Note: Filed nomination papers as PTI candidate but ECP allowed him to run as an Independent)	18,632	14.56	
TLP	Muhammad Arshad Chaudhary	9,889	7.73	
Independent	Rana Ubaid Afzal	7,880	6.16	
PPP	Wahab Ali Sultan	2,869	2.24	
Others	Others (six candidates)	2,787	2.17	
Turnout		131,230	57.28	
Total valid votes		127,993	97.53	
Rejected ballots		3,237	2.47	
Majority		7,676	6.00	
Registered electors		229,116		
hold				

== General elections 2018 ==
Provincial election 2018: PP-205 Khanewal-III
Party	Candidate	Votes	%	±%
PTI	Hamid Yar Hiraj	57,203	48.02	
PML(N)	Chaudhary Fazal Ur Rehman	54,290	45.58	
TLP	Muhammad Mushtaq	2,769	2.33	
MMA	Husni Mubarak	1,928	1.62	
PPP	Muhammad Saddique	1,455	1.22	
PRHP	Muhammad Akram	1,198	1.01	
Independent	Muhammad Azhar Iqbal	272	0.23	
Turnout		121,326	60.28	
Total valid votes		119,115	98.18	
Rejected ballots		2,211	1.82	
Majority		2,913	2.44	
Registered electors		201,285		

== General elections 2013 ==
Provincial election 2013: PP-215 Khanewal-IV
Party	Candidate	Votes	%	±%
PML(N)	Ch. Fazal Ur Rehman	45,039	47.73	
PML(Q)	Ahmad Yar Hiraj	39,050	41.38	
PTI	Muhammad Khan	5,213	5.52	
Independent	Husni Mubarak	3,381	3.58	
Others	Others (six candidates)	1,684	1.78	
Turnout		96,757	62.53	
Total valid votes		94,367	97.53	
Rejected ballots		2,390	2.47	
Majority		5,989	6.35	
Registered electors		154,740		

== General elections 2008 ==
Contesting candidates	Party affiliation	Votes polled

== See also ==
- PP-205 Khanewal-I
- PP-207 Khanewal-III
