= Environment of Pakistan =

This article discusses topics related to the environment of Pakistan.

== Pollution ==
Pollution is the introduction of contaminants into the natural environment that cause adverse change. Pollution can take the form of chemical substances or energy, such as noise, heat or light. Pollutants, the components of pollution, can be either foreign substances/energies or naturally occurring contaminants. Pollution is often classed as point source or nonpoint source pollution.

=== Coast Pollution ===
Pakistan's coastline, which stretches over 1,046 km, is facing severe pollution due to a combination of industrial, port, municipal, and transportation activities in the area. The coastline is being overwhelmed with water-borne pollution being discharged in the shipping process into the marine environment. A recent study found that some of the marine life was contaminated with lead, which if consumed by humans through seafood, has been linked to anemia, kidney failure and brain damage. In fact, the study also discovered that even the mangrove forests protecting the feeder creeks from sea erosion as well as a source of sustenance for fishermen are threatened by this pollution.

=== Air pollution ===
The Air pollution is the release of chemicals and particulates into the atmosphere. Common gaseous pollutants include carbon monoxide, sulfur dioxide, chlorofluorocarbons (CFCs) and nitrogen oxides produced by industry and motor vehicles. Photochemical ozone and smog are created as nitrogen oxides and hydrocarbons react to sunlight. Particulate matter, or fine dust is characterized by their micrometre size PM_{10} to PM_{2.5}. The air in Karachi is rapidly polluted by automobile smoke, especially Rickshaws and Buses, industrial emissions, open burning of garbage, house fires, and other particles but the government and environment organizations seems non-serious to tackle the issue timely.

==== Rickshaws ====
The two-stroke engines on rickshaws and motorcycles are one of the major polluters of air in Karachi and the rest of Pakistan. The two-stroke engines as well as defective or unturned vehicles are major polluters with carbon dioxide emissions. Two-stroke engines as well as defective vehicles using substandard lubricant are major emitters of sulfur dioxide and smoke. Automobiles operating on compressed natural gas and liquefied petroleum gas are major air polluters.

=== Light pollution ===
The Light pollution includes light trespass, over-illumination and astronomical interference.

=== Littering ===
Littering is the criminal throwing of inappropriate man-made objects, unremoved, onto public and private properties.

=== Noise pollution ===
Noise pollution which encompasses roadway noise, aircraft noise, industrial noise as well as high-intensity sonar. The noise for Karachi came to 80 dB (A), the General Noise Index x (G.N.I.) to 460, and the noise pollution level (N.P.L.) to 99 dB (A). These values are significantly higher (P less than 0.01) than the available international data.

=== Soil contamination ===
Soil contamination occurs when chemicals are released by spill or underground leakage. Among the most significant soil contaminants are hydrocarbons, heavy metals, MTBE, herbicides, pesticides and chlorinated hydrocarbons.

=== Radioactive contamination ===
Radioactive contamination resulting from 20th century activities in atomic physics, such as nuclear power generation and nuclear weapons research, manufacture and deployment. (See alpha emitters and actinides in the environment)

=== Thermal pollution ===
Thermal pollution is a temperature change in natural water bodies caused by human influence, such as use of water as coolant in a power plant.

=== Visual pollution ===
Visual pollution, which can refer to the presence of overhead power lines, motorway billboards, scarred landforms (as from strip mining), open smunicipal solid waste or space debris.

=== Water pollution ===
Water pollution id by the discharge of wastewater from commercial and industrial waste (intentionally or through spills) into surface waters; discharges of untreated domestic sewage, and chemical contaminants, such as chlorine, from treated sewage; release of waste and contaminants into surface runoff flowing to surface waters (including urban runoff and agricultural runoff, which may contain chemical fertilizers and pesticides); waste disposal and leaching into groundwater; eutrophication and littering.

==== Tanning ====
Pakistan exports Leather product using Leather production processes including tanning. In addition to the other environmental impacts of leather, the production processes have a high environmental impact, most notably due to:

- the heavy use of polluting chemicals in the tanning process
- air pollution due to the transformation process (hydrogen sulfide during dehairing and ammonia during deliming, solvent vapours).

One tonne of hide or skin generally leads to the production of 20 to 80 m3 of turbid and foul-smelling wastewater, including chromium levels of 100–400 mg/L, sulfide levels of 200–800 mg/L and high levels of fat and other solid wastes, as well as notable pathogen contamination. Pesticides are also often added for hide conservation during transport. With solid wastes representing up to 70% of the wet weight of the original hides, the tanning process comes at a considerable strain on water treatment installations.

== Climate ==
most part of Pakistan lies in the arid to semi arid climatic zone. However there is a lot of variation observed in Pakistan due to different relief features, from lofty mountains to low-lying areas. for the most part the climate of Pakistan is divided into four major climatic zones

1 High land climate zone (including all the mountainous regions of Pakistan's western and northern mountains) 2 low land climatic zone (including all the plain areas of Pakistan comprising the whole Indus plain except the Indus delta) 3 arid climate zone ( this zone includes the south eastern deserts like Cholistan, Nara and Tharparker ) 4 coastal climate zone ( including the coastal stripe from Makran coast to Karachi coast and Sindh coastal areas of Pakistan)

== Environmental policy ==
Environmental affairs in Pakistan are managed and regulated by the Ministry of Environment (Pakistan), headed by the Minister for Environment (Pakistan).

== See also ==
- List of environmental issues
- Pakistan Environmental Protection Agency
