= Syed Khawar Ali Shah =

Pakistani politician

Member of the Provincial Assembly of the Punjab
- In office 15 August 2018 – 14 January 2023
- Constituency: PP-203 Khanewal-I

Personal details
- Party: PTI (2013-present)

Syed Khawar Ali Shah is a Pakistani politician who had been a member of the Provincial Assembly of the Punjab from August 2018 till January 2023.

== Political career ==
He was elected to the Provincial Assembly of the Punjab as an independent candidate from PP-203 (Khanewal-I) in the 2018 Punjab provincial election.

He joined the Pakistan Tehreek-e-Insaf (PTI) following his election.

He ran for a seat in the Provincial Assembly from PP-203 Khanewal-I as a candidate of the PTI in the 2024 Punjab provincial election.
