= Syed Fakhar Imam =

Pakistani politician

- سید فخر امام
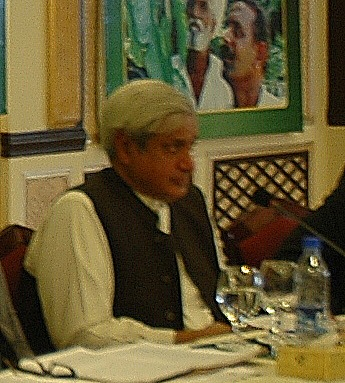
- Imam in 2012

Federal Minister for National Food Security and Research
- In office 6 April 2020 – 10 April 2022
- President: Arif Alvi
- Prime Minister: Imran Khan
- Preceded by: Khusro Bakhtiar
- Succeeded by: Tariq Bashir Cheema

Chairman of Parliamentary Special Committee on Kashmir
- In office 1 March 2019 – 6 April 2020
- Succeeded by: Shehryar Khan Afridi

Federal Minister for Education
- In office 9 November 1990 – 18 July 1993
- President: Ghulam Ishaq Khan
- Prime Minister: Nawaz Sharif

Federal Minister for Law
- In office 9 November 1990 – March 1991
- President: Ghulam Ishaq Khan
- Prime Minister: Nawaz Sharif

Federal Minister for Parliamentary Affairs
- In office November 1990 – March 1991
- President: Ghulam Ishaq Khan
- Prime Minister: Nawaz Sharif

Leader of the Opposition
- In office June 1986 – May 1988

9th Speaker of the National Assembly of Pakistan
- In office 22 March 1985 – 29 May 1986
- Deputy: Wazir Ahmed Jogezai

Federal Minister for Local Government and Rural Development
- In office 9 March 1981 – 8 December 1983

Member of the National Assembly of Pakistan
- In office 13 August 2018 – 10 August 2023
- Constituency: NA-150 Khanewal-I
- In office 1997–1999
- Constituency: Khanewal
- In office 1990–1993
- Constituency: NA-121 Khanewal-I
- In office 1985–1988
- Constituency: NA-111 Multan-I
- In office 9 March 1981 – 24 March 1985
- Constituency: Martial Law Government

Personal details
- Born: 18 December 1942 (age 83)
- Party: PTI (2023-present)
- Other political affiliations: PMLN (2022-2023); PTI (2018-2022); PMLN (2013-2018); PPP (2008-2013); PML-Q (2001-2008); PMLN (1997-1999); PPP (1993-1996); PMLN (1990-1993); Islami Jamhoori Ittehad (1988-1990); Pakistan Muslim League (1985-1988)
- Spouse: Abida Hussain
- Children: Syeda Sughra Imam, Syeda Umme Kulsum, Syed Abid Hussain Imam
- Relatives: Syed Abid Hussain Shah (father-in-law)

Syed Fakhar Imam (Urdu: سید فخر امام; born 18 December 1942) is a Pakistani politician and statesman who has held several positions in the Government of Pakistan, including the Minister for Parliamentary Affairs, the Minister for Law and the Minister for Education, and most recently as Federal Minister for National Food Security and Research, from April 2020 to April 2022. He was preceded by Malik Meraj Khalid, serving as the 11th speaker of the National Assembly of Pakistan from 1985 to 1986. Imam has previously worked as the Chairman of Pakistan's Parliamentary Special Committee on Kashmir.

He was elected to the national assembly as independent party candidate and subsequently joined Pakistan Tehreek-i-Insaf (PTI).

== Early life and education ==
Imam was born on December 18, 1942, in Lahore. He belongs to Qatalpur, Khanewal District. His father, Syed Imam Shah AliGarh graduate (1933), served in British Army as Recruiting Officer and was a leading landlord of his area. Imam studied at Aitchison College, Lahore, then joined Clifton College, an English public school before turning to study agriculture at the University of California, Davis.

== Early career ==
From 1968 to 1969, he served in Central Superior Services of the Government of Pakistan to gain an understanding of the bureaucracy; not intending to make it his life's work. From 1970-1974, he worked in the private sector. In 1975, he served as Honorary Secretary for Board of Control for Cricket in Pakistan. He was elected as the Chairman of Punjab Cricket Association from 1976 to 1977.

== Political career ==
In 1980, he began his political career when he was elected as the Chairman District Council, Multan and was appointed Federal Minister for Local Government and Rural Development in 1981 and resigned as a matter of honor, in December 1983 when he lost his local district council election of Multan District by one vote. From 1981 to 1982, Imam served as the Chairman of the Local Government Commission.

Imam served as Chairman of the Sports Committee to promote the spirit of sports among youth and the educational institutions of Pakistan.

In the non-party General Elections in February 1985, he was elected to the National Assembly from Multan District.

=== 11th speaker of National Assembly ===
On February 25, 1985, then-president Zia Ul Haq arranged non-party general elections and was confident of getting his favorite speaker, Khawaja Safdar and the father of Khawaja Asif elected to run the House.

On March 22, 1985, by 119 votes to 111 votes, Imam defeated Safdar the chosen candidate for Chief Martial Law Administrator by Zia Ul Haq and Prime Minister Muhammad Khan Junejo, what was widely seen as the biggest upset victory.

Two months later, at the conclusion of the budget debate, Imam shocked the assembly when deemed martial law "illegal and without lawful authority" since funds needed to administer it were not reflected in the budget.

On May 26, 1986, Rana Nazir Ahmad moved a no-confidence motion against Imam and 152 Members of the National Assembly voted to remove Imam while he received only 72 votes which resulted in removing him from the office. After removing him from office, he served as the leader of the opposition in the National Assembly.

== Federal Minister for National Food Security and Research ==
President Arif Alvi administered oath to Imam as Federal Minister for National Food Security on April 6, 2020 in a ceremony held at the Aiwan-e-Sadr.

== Personal life ==
Imam is married to Syeda Abida Hussain who served as the Minister of Population Control and Census and Minister of Food and Agriculture in the government of Nawaz Sharif and Pakistan's ambassador to the US from 1991 to 1993. They have three children, Syeda Umme Kulsum, an entrepreneur, and Syeda Sughra Imam and Syed Abid Hussain Imam who are politicians.

Political offices
Preceded by Malik Meraj Khalid	Speaker of the National Assembly; 1985–1986	Succeeded by Hamid Nasir Chattha
Preceded by Muhammad Saifullah	Leader of the Opposition; 1985–1988	Succeeded by Ghulam Haider Wyne
