= Muhammad Khan Daha =

Pakistani politician

- محمد خان ڈاھا

Member of the National Assembly of Pakistan
- Incumbent
- Assumed office 29 February 2024
- Constituency: NA-145 Khanewal-II
- In office 13 August 2018 – 10 August 2023
- Constituency: NA-151 (Khanewal-II)
- In office 1 June 2013 – 31 May 2018
- Constituency: NA-157 (Khanewal-II)

Personal details
- Born: 1 August 1970 (age 56)
- Party: PMLN (2008-present)

Muhammad Khan Daha (Urdu: محمد خان ڈاھا; born 1 August 1970) (s/o Irfan Khan Daha) is a Pakistani politician who has been a member of the National Assembly of Pakistan since February 2024 and previously served in this position from August 2018 till August 2023 and from June 2013 to May 2018.

== Early life ==
He was born on 1 August 1970 in a political family.

== Political career ==
He ran for the seat of the National Assembly of Pakistan as a candidate of Pakistan Muslim League (N) (PML-N) from Constituency NA-157 (Khanewal-II) in the 2008 Pakistani general election but was unsuccessful. He received 58,231 votes and lost the seat to Hamid Yar Hiraj.

He was elected to the National Assembly as a candidate of PML-N from Constituency NA-157 (Khanewal-II) in the 2013 Pakistani general election. He received 96,162 votes and defeated Hamid Yar Hiraj.

He was re-elected to the National Assembly as a candidate of PML-N from NA-151 (Khanewal-II) in the 2018 Pakistani general election. He received 111,325 votes and defeated Ahmad Yar Hiraj, a candidate of Pakistan Tehreek-e-Insaf (PTI).

He was re-elected to the National Assembly as a candidate of PML-N from NA-145 Khanewal-II in the 2024 Pakistani general election. He received 102,952 votes and defeated Abid Mahmood, an Independent politician candidate supported by PTI.
