= List of members of the 4th Assembly of Gilgit-Baltistan =

Members of the Gilgit-Baltistan Assembly (2026-present)

4th Gilgit-Baltistan Assembly
←	3rd Gilgit-Baltistan Assembly

Overview
- Legislative body: Gilgit-Baltistan Assembly
- Jurisdiction: Pakistan
- Meeting place: Gilgit-Baltistan Assembly Building, Jutial
- Term: 22 June 2026 –
- Election: 2026 Gilgit Baltistan Assembly election
- Government: Government of Gilgit-Baltistan
- Website: Official website

Gilgit-Baltistan Assembly
- Members: 33
- Speaker: Nazir Ahmed; Imran Nadeem
- Deputy Speaker: Malik Kifayatur Rehman
- Chief Minister: Amjad Hussain Azar
- Leader of the Opposition: Hafiz Hafeezur Rehman
- Governor: Syed Mehdi Shah
- Party control: PPP

The 4th Assembly of Gilgit-Baltistan was elected in the 2026 elections held on 7 June 2026. 30 of 33 members were sworn in on the morning of 22 June 2026.

== Party position ==
The below table shows the standings of each political party and independents.

Party	Members			Total
Party	General Seats	Reserved for Women	Reserved for Technocrats	Total
PPP	12	3	1	16
PMLN	6	2	1	9
IPP	4	1	1	6
MWM	1	0	0	1
IND (Note: The sole independent in the Assembly, Syed Sohail Abbas Shah, was elected as an independent supported by Pakistan Tehreek-e-Insaf (PTI). PTI could not nominate candidates to the 2026 elections because the Election Commission Gilgit-Baltistan prohibited the PTI election symbol.)	1	0	0	1
Total	24	6	3	33

== List of Members of the 4th Assembly of Gilgit Baltistan ==
Members of the 4th Assembly of Gilgit Baltistan are as follows:

Sr no.	Constituency	Name of Member	Party	Assumed office	Notes
1	GBA-1 Gilgit-I	Amjad Hussain Azar	PPP	22 June 2026	Chief Minister (2026—present)
2	GBA-2 Gilgit-II	Hafeezur Rehman	PML(N)	22 June 2026	Leader of the Opposition (2026—present)
3	GBA-3 Gilgit-III	Syed Sohail Abbas Shah	IND	22 June 2026	
4	GBA-4 Nagar-I	Muhammad Ali Akhtar	PPP	22 June 2026	
5	GBA-5 Nagar-II	Zulfiqar Ali Murad	PPP	22 June 2026	
6	GBA-6 Hunza	Naik Nam Karim	PPP (Note: Karim was elected as an independent supported by PTI, but later joined PPP.)	22 June 2026	
7	GBA-7 Skardu-I	Syed Tauqeer Mehdi	PPP	22 June 2026	
8	GBA-8 Skardu-II	Muhammad Kazim Maisam	MWM	22 June 2026	
9	GBA-9 Skardu-III	Fida Muhammad Nashad	PPP	N/A	Nashad was elected to the 4th Assembly, but was disqualified before he could take oath.
9	GBA-9 Skardu-III	Akhtar Abbas	PPP	8 September 2026	
10	GBA-10 Skardu-IV	Raja Nasir Ali Khan	PPP	22 June 2026	
11	GBA-11 Kharmang	Iqbal Hassan	PPP	22 June 2026	
12	GBA-12 Shigar	Imran Nadeem	PPP	22 June 2026	Speaker (2026—present)
13	GBA-13 Astore-I	Rana Farman Ali	PML(N)	22 June 2026	
14	GBA-14 Astore-II	Rana Muhammad Farooq	PML(N)	22 June 2026	
15	GBA-15 Diamer-I	Muhammad Dilpazir	IPP (Note: 4 members were elected as independents, but joined IPP after the election.)	13 July 2026	
16	GBA-16 Diamer-II	Imam Malik	IPP	22 June 2026	Malik was initially declared the winner from his constituency on 19 June 2026, defeating Attaullah Shah. However, an election tribunal later suspended this notification on 11 September 2026, ordering the returning officer to verify and count postal ballots. In the final count, Malik lost to Shah by 13 votes.
	GBA-16 Diamer-II	Attaullah Shah	PPP	22 September 2026.	Malik was initially declared the winner from his constituency on 19 June 2026, defeating Attaullah Shah. However, an election tribunal later suspended this notification on 11 September 2026, ordering the returning officer to verify and count postal ballots. In the final count, Malik lost to Shah by 13 votes.
17	GBA-17 Diamer-III	Muhammad Naseem	PPP	13 July 2026	
18	GBA-18 Diamer-IV	Malik Kifayatur Rehman	PML(N)	22 June 2026	Deputy Speaker (2026—present)
19	GBA-19 Ghizer-I	Syed Jalal Ali Shah	PPP	22 June 2026	
20	GBA-20 Ghizer-II	Abdul Jahan	PML(N)	22 June 2026	
21	GBA-21 Ghizer-III	Aman Ali	IPP	22 June 2026	
22	GBA-22 Ghanche-I	Muhammad Ibrahim Sanai	PML(N)	22 June 2026	
23	GBA-23 Ghanche-II	Anwar Ali	IPP	22 June 2026	
24	GBA-24 Ghanche-III	Asad Shafiq	IPP	22 June 2026	
25	Reserved for Women	Kalsoom Jahangir	PPP	22 June 2026	
26	Reserved for Women	Sadia Danish	PPP	22 June 2026	
27	Reserved for Women	Sobia Jabeen	PPP	22 June 2026	
28	Reserved for Women	Sajida Begum	PML(N)	22 June 2026	
29	Reserved for Women	Jennifer Bahadur	PML(N)	22 June 2026	
30	Reserved for Women	Dilshad Bano	IPP	22 June 2026	
31	Technocrats	Muhammad Sharif	PPP	22 June 2026	
32	Technocrats	Sahib Khan	PML(N)	22 June 2026	
33	Technocrats	Muhammad Ali	IPP	22 June 2026	
