= 2026 Gilgit Baltistan Assembly election =

Pakistani regional election

- 7 June 2026

24 of the 33 seats in the Gilgit-Baltistan Assembly (Note: Six seats are reserved for women, three seats are reserved for technocrats.) 17 seats needed for a majority
- Registered: 960,496
- Turnout: 57.69%

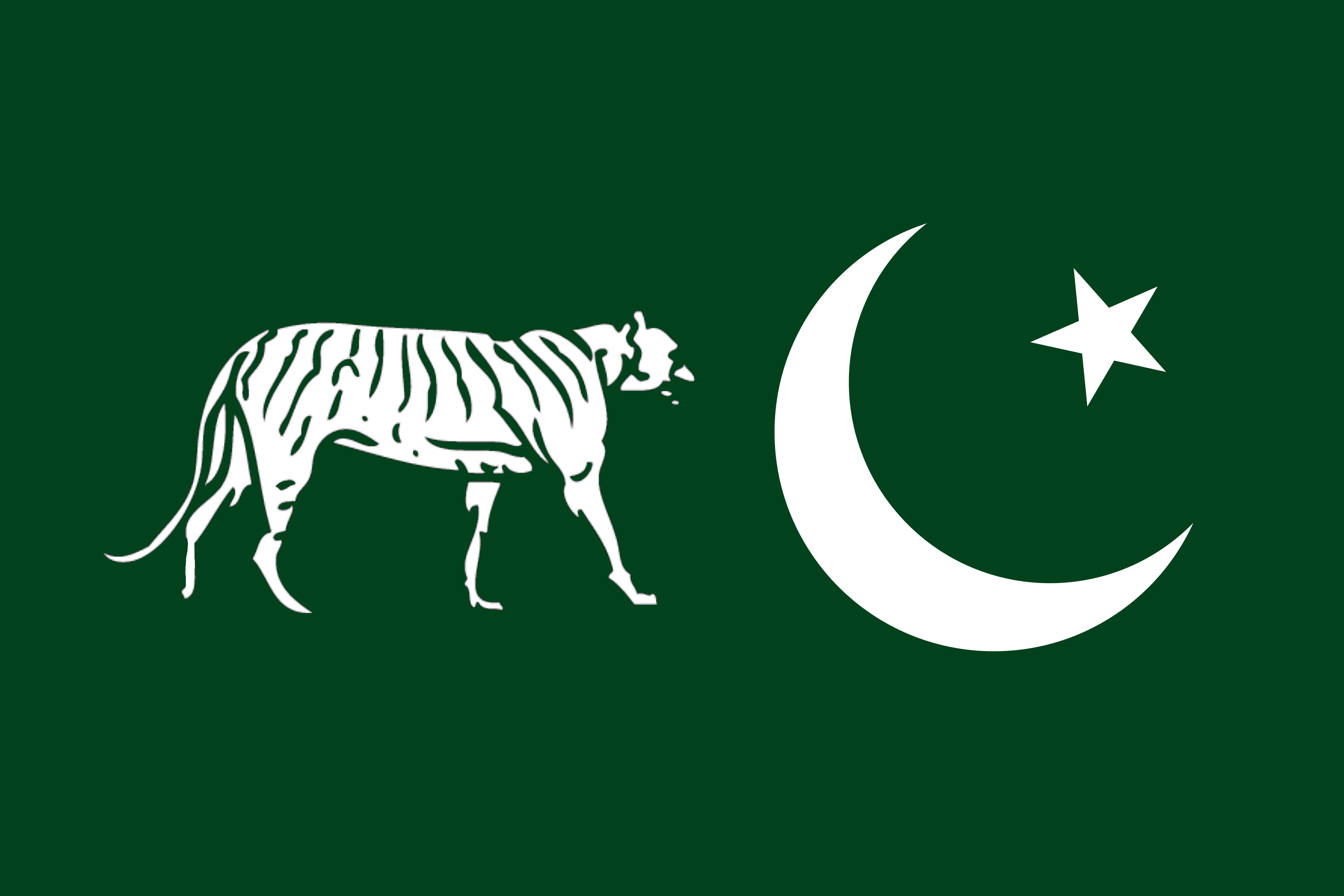

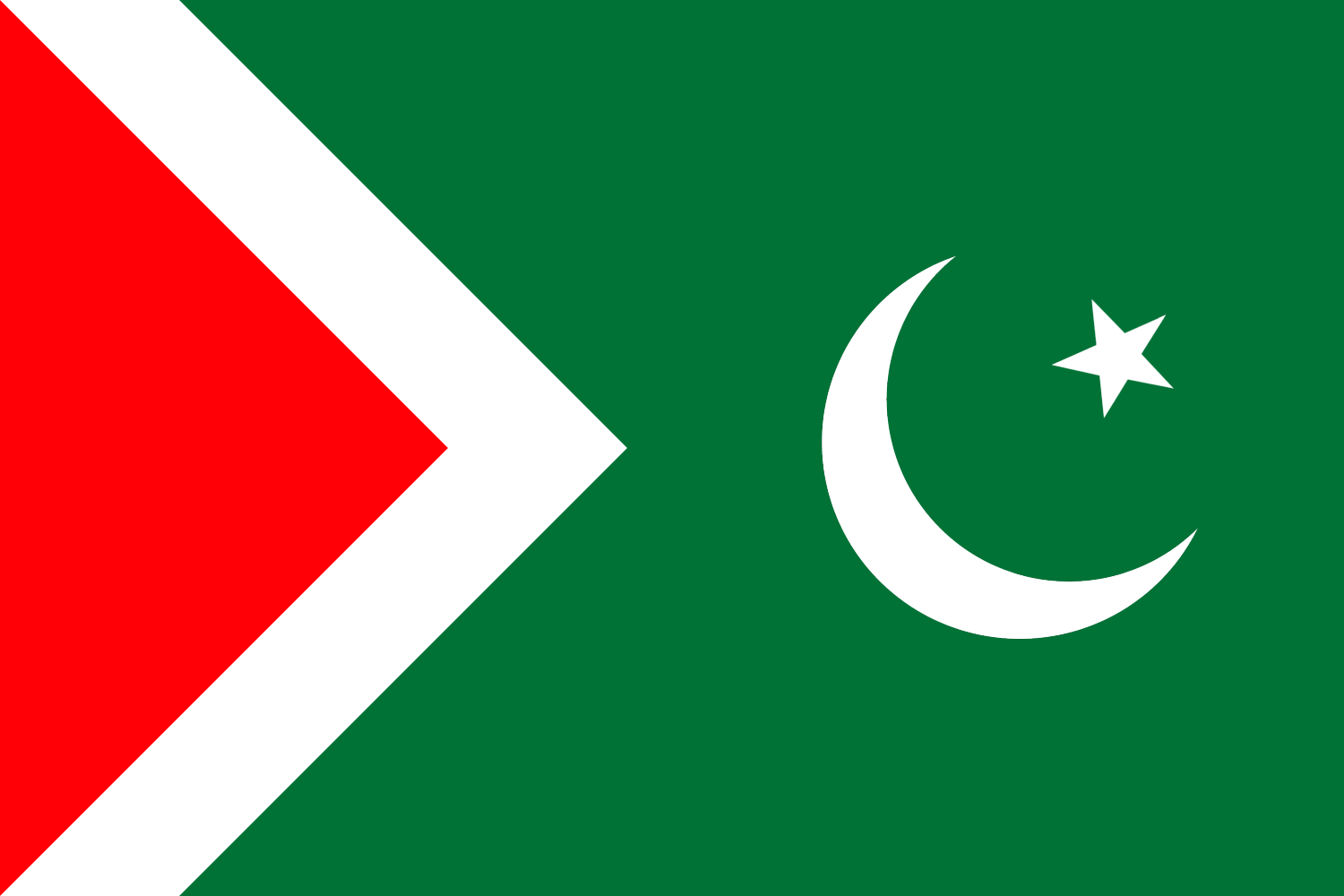

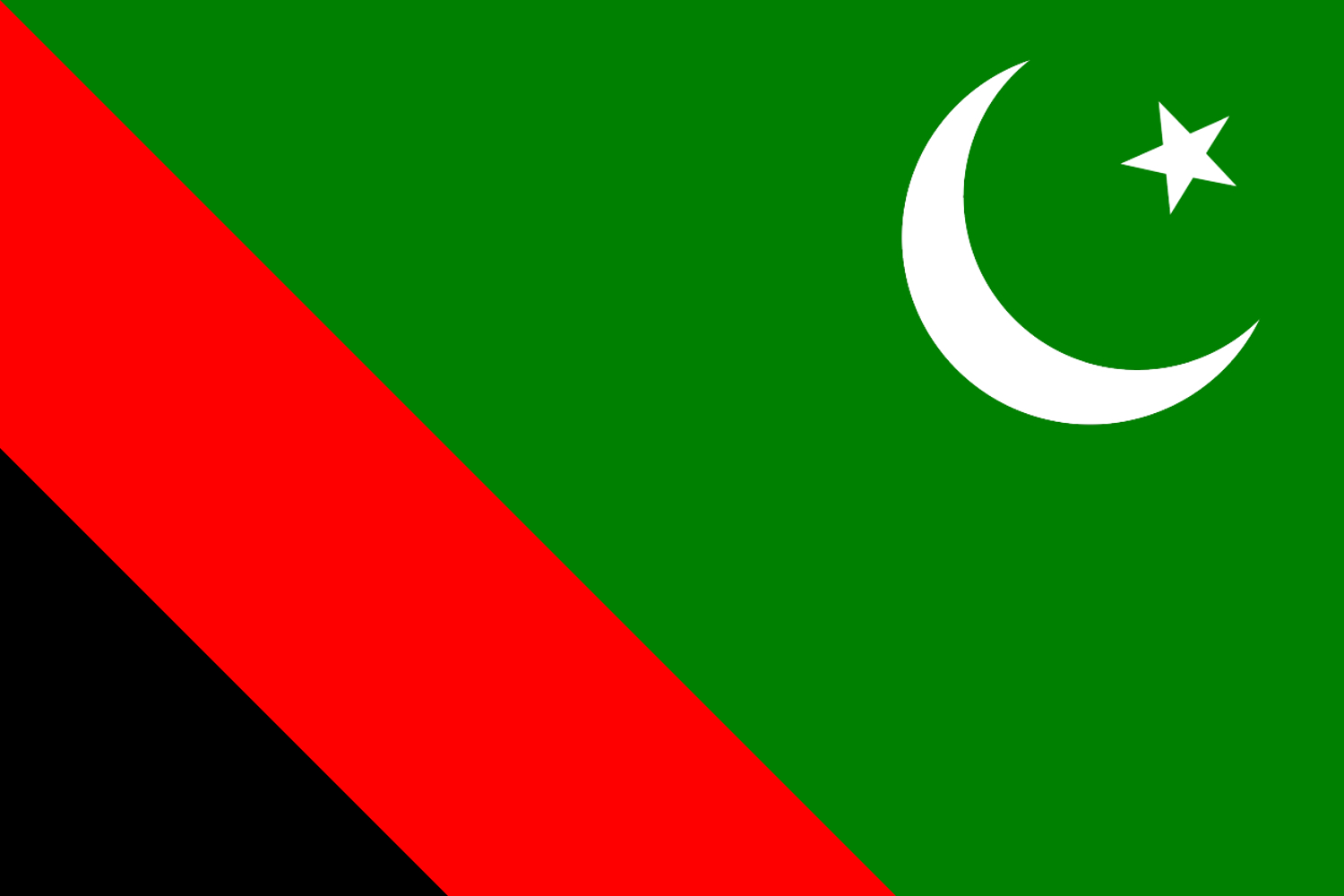
	First party	Second party	Third party
Leader	Amjad Hussain Azar	Hafiz Hafeezur Rehman	Gulbar Khan
Party	PPP	PML(N)	IPP
Leader since	9 December 2015	6 February 2015	30 May 2022
Leader's seat	Gilgit-I	Gilgit-II	Diamer-IV (lost re-election)
Last election	5 seats	3 seats	New party
Seats before	5	3	0
Seats won	14	9	7 (Note: Five MLAs were elected as independents, but joined IPP after the election.)
Seat change	▲9	▲6	▲7
Popular vote	163,149	120,546	41,958
Percentage	29.94%	22.12%	7.70%
	Fourth party	Fifth party
Leader	Khalid Khurshid	Muhammad Kazim Maisam
Party	PTI independents (Note: PTI members who contested in the general election ran as independent candidates aligned with the party because the Election Commission Gilgit-Baltistan prohibited the PTI election symbol.)	MWM
Leader's seat	Did not contest	Skardu-II
Last election	22 seats	1 seat
Seats before	21	1
Seats won	2 (Note: Naik Nam Karim, the PTI-supported independent who won from GBA-6 Hunza, joined PPP after the election.)	1
Seat change	▼19	Steady
Popular vote	36,773	22,756
Percentage	6.75%	4.18%
- Constituency map of the Gilgit Baltistan Assembly, showing winning parties.
Chief Minister before election
Yar Muhammad
Independent
Elected Chief Minister
Amjad Hussain Azar
PPP

On 7 June 2026, elections were held in Gilgit Baltistan, Pakistan, to appoint the 24 members of the 4th Gilgit-Baltistan Assembly, the highest body of the Government of Gilgit-Baltistan.

According to official results, the Pakistan People's Party (PPP) won ten general seats while Pakistan Muslim League (N) (PML(N)) emerged to be the second largest party with six general seats. Independent candidates supported by Pakistan Tehreek-e-Insaf (PTI) won two general seats and Majlis Wahdat-e-Muslimeen (MWM) won one general seat. Other independent candidates garnered five general seats. These five independents later joined Istehkam-e-Pakistan Party (IPP). Moreover, one of the PTI-supported independents later joined PPP. After the allotment of reserved seats and re-polling held in two constituencies, the party standings were as follows: 15 seats for PPP, 9 seats for PML(N), 7 seats for IPP, and 1 seat each for MWM and PTI-supported independents.

== Background ==
=== 2020 elections ===
Following the elections in 2020, the Pakistan Tehreek-e-Insaf (PTI) emerged as the largest party after winning 16 of the 24 general seats in the Gilgit-Baltistan Assembly, and securing a two-thirds supermajority in the assembly after six women representatives (four who went to the PTI) and the three technocrats (two who went to the PTI) were added with a final total of 22 out of 33 seats. Khalid Khurshid was elected as the Chief Minister of Gilgit-Baltistan. The PTI became the first party in the history of Gilgit-Baltistan to secure a two-thirds majority.

=== Election of Gulbar Khan ===
On 4 July 2023, a three-member bench of the Gilgit-Baltistan Chief Court disqualified Khurshid following a court case that revealed his law degree from London to be fake. The case against Khursheed was filed by Ghulam Shahzad Agha, a member of the Pakistan People's Party (PPP) who argued that his degree was fraudulent. As a result of his disqualification, he was de-seated and the PTI government in Gilgit-Baltistan was dissolved.

On 13 July 2023, Gulbar Khan, another PTI member of the Assembly, was elected as Chief Minister after securing 19 votes, including three each from the Pakistan Muslim League (N) PML(N) and Pakistan People's Party (PPP), and one from the Jamiat Ulema-e-Islam (F) (JUI(F)). The remaining twelve votes were from PTI members, who subsequently formed a forward bloc in the assembly. Khan's cabinet included two members each from the PML(N) and PPP, one from the JUI(F), and nine from the PTI forward bloc.

== Timeline ==
- 24 November 2025: The Gilgit-Baltistan Assembly completed its 5-year tenure at midnight. Elections must be held no more than 60 days after this date. Prime Minister Shehbaz Sharif and President Asif Ali Zardari appointed Yar Muhammad, a retired Justice of the Gilgit-Baltistan Chief Court, as the region's caretaker Chief Minister.
- 26 November 2025: Governor Syed Mehdi Shah administered the oath of office to Yar Muhammad.
- 2 December 2025: The Election Commission of Gilgit-Baltistan (ECGB) announced the schedule of the 2026 elections, setting 24 January 2026 as the date when polling will be held.
- 18 December 2025: After consultation with 20 political parties at a multi-party conference, the ECGB announced that the elections would be delayed due to harsh weather conditions in the region.
- 6 January 2026: The caretaker cabinet of Chief Minister Yar Muhammad was sworn in, consisting of twelve ministers and two advisors.
- 11 February 2026: Former Gilgit-Baltistan governor Raja Jalal Hussain Maqpoon joined IPP.
- 11 April 2026: The ECGB announced the new election schedule, setting 7 June 2026 as the date when polling will be held.
- 7 June 2026: Polls opened.

== Seats held before elections ==
The table below lists the ten political parties that fielded at least three candidates (out of a possible 24 constituencies) or held seats at the end of the term of the 3rd Gilgit-Baltistan Assembly.

Name		National Leader	Claimed Ideology(ies)	Total seats at start of the 3rd Gilgit-Baltistan Assembly	Total seats at the end of the 3rd Gilgit-Baltistan Assembly (Note: One seat was vacant at the end of the assembly's term.)	Symbol
PPP	Pakistan Peoples Party پاکستان پیپلز پارٹی	Bilawal Bhutto Zardari	Social Democracy; Social liberalism	5 / 33	5 / 33	Arrow
PML(N)	Pakistan Muslim League (Nawaz) پاکستان مسلم لیگ (نواز)	Nawaz Sharif	Conservatism; Economic liberalism Federalism	3 / 33	3 / 33	Tiger
IPP	Istehkam-e-Pakistan Party استحکام پاکستان پارٹی	Aleem Khan	Populism; Islamic Democracy	0 / 33	0 / 33	Eagle
PTI	Pakistan Tehreek-e-Insaf پاکستان تحريکِ انصاف	Gohar Ali Khan	Populism; Islamic Democracy; Welfarism	22 / 33	20 / 33	Bat (Miscellaneous)
MWM	Majlis Wahdat-e-Muslimeen مجلس وحدتِ مسلمین	Raja Nasir Abbas Jafri	Pan-Islamism; Welfarism; Populism	1 / 33	1 / 33	Tent
ITP	Islami Tehreek Pakistan اسلامی تحریک پاکستان	Syed Sajid Ali Naqvi	Shia Islamism	0 / 33	1 / 33	Two swords
JUI(F)	Jamiat Ulema-e-Islam (Fazl) جمیعت علمائے اسلام (فضل)	Fazl-ur-Rahman	Islamism; Clericalism; Conservatism	1 / 33	1 / 33	Book
BNF(N) (Note: Represented by Nawaz Khan Naji. Although Naji is the leader of Balawaristan National Front (Naji), he ran as an independent in the elections and served as an independent member in the assembly.)	Balawaristan National Front (Naji) بلاورستان نيشنل فرنٹ (ناجی)	Nawaz Khan Naji	Gilgit-Baltistan Autonomy	1 / 33	1 / 33	Revolver
MQM(P)	Muttahida Qaumi Movement (Pakistan) متحدہ قومی موومنٹ (پاکستان)	Khalid Maqbool Siddiqui	Liberalism; Muhajir Nationalism; Secularism	0 / 33	0 / 33	Kite
PML(Q)	Pakistan Muslim League (Quaid e Azam) پاکستان مسلم لیگ (قائد اعظم)	Shujaat Hussain	Conservatism; Pakistani Nationalism	0 / 33	0 / 33	Tractor
AWP	Awami Workers Party عوامی ورکرز پارٹی	Akhtar Hussain	Democratic socialism Progressivism	0 / 33	0 / 33	Light bulb
JIP	Jamaat-e-Islami Pakistan جماعت اسلامی پاکستان	Hafiz Naeem ur Rehman	Pan-Islamism; Islamic democracy Social conservatism	0 / 33	0 / 33	Scales

== Results ==
The two tables below show the results of the elections. The first table shows the results for the elections across all 24 constituencies, and shows each political party's standing after independents joining different parties and the allotment of reserved seats. The second table shows more detailed results for each of the 24 constituencies.

Party	Votes	%	Seats						
Party	Votes	%	Contested	Won (General)	Reserved (Women)	Reserved (Technocrats)	Independents joined	Total	+/-
PPP	163,149	29.94%	23	10	3	1	1	15 / 33	▲10
PML(N)	120,546	22.12%	22	6	2	1	0	9 / 33	▲6
IPP	41,958	7.70%	19	0	1	1	5	7 / 33	▲7
PTI	36,773	6.75%	15	2	0	0	-1	1 / 33	▼19
MWM	22,756	4.18%	7	1	0	0	0	1 / 33	Steady
ITP	22,352	4.10%	10	0	0	0	0	0 / 33	Steady
JUI(F)	14,342	2.63%	9	0	0	0	0	0 / 33	▼1
BNF(N)	7,075	1.30%	1	0	0	0	0	0 / 33	▼1
AWP	3,832	0.70%	4	0	0	0	0	0 / 33	Steady
PRHP	2,290	0.42%	1	0	0	0	0	0 / 33	Steady
JI	1,420	0.26%	6	0	0	0	0	0 / 33	Steady
PML(Q)	1,093	0.20%	12	0	0	0	0	0 / 33	Steady
Pakistan Nazriyati Party	790	0.15%	11	0	0	0	0	0 / 33	Steady
MQM(P)	434	0.08%	6	0	0	0	0	0 / 33	Steady
PMML	134	0.03%	1	0	0	0	0	0 / 33	Steady
TLP	77	0.01%	1	0	0	0	0	0 / 33	Steady
ANP	53	0.01%	1	0	0	0	0	0 / 33	Steady
PAT	22	0.004%	1	0	0	0	0	0 / 33	Steady
SIC	19	0.004%	1	0	0	0	0	0 / 33	Steady
Pakistan Awami League	17	0.003%	1	0	0	0	0	0 / 33	Steady
TTP	7	0.001%	1	0	0	0	0	0 / 33	Steady
IND	105,834	19.42%	236	5	0	0	-5	0 / 33	Steady
Valid ballots/Total seats	544,973	98.36%	389	24	6	3	0	33	-
Rejected ballots	9,093	1.64%							
Cast ballots	554,066	-							
Registered voters/turnout	960,496	57.69%							

=== By constituency ===
Constituency		Winner				Runner-up				Margin	Registered Voters	Votes Cast	Voter Turnout	Source(s)
District	Name	Candidate	Party	Votes	%	Candidate	Party	Votes	%	Margin	Registered Voters	Votes Cast	Voter Turnout	Source(s)
Gilgit	GBA-1	Amjad Hussain	PPP	11,287	37.89	Muhammad Shafiq Ud Din	PML(N)	6,472	21.73	4,815	45,792	30,723	67.09	
Gilgit	GBA-2	Hafeezur Rehman	PML(N)	14,788	44.31	Jamil Ahmad	PPP	9,319	27.92	5,469	56,019	33,375	59.58	
Gilgit	GBA-3	Syed Sohail Abbas Shah	PTI	8,060	26.97	Aftab Haider	PPP	7,665	25.65	395	52,522	30,529	58.13	
Nagar	GBA-4	Muhammad Ali Akhtar	PPP	7,973	42.22	Muhammad Ayub Waziri	ITP	6,805	36.03	1,168	29,970	19,239	64.19	
Nagar	GBA-5	Zulfiqar Ali Murad	PPP	2,780	25.50	Riaz Akbar	MWM	2,562	23.50	218	18,300	11,214	61.28	
Hunza	GBA-6	Naik Nam Karim	PTI	6,429	29.35	Imtiaz Ul Haque	PPP	5,499	25.10	930	52,237	22,628	43.32	
Skardu	GBA-7	Syed Tauqeer Mehdi	PPP	4,622	32.49	Raja Jalal Hussain Maqpoon	IPP	4,134	29.27	488	22,056	14,545	65.95	
Skardu	GBA-8	Muhammad Kazim Maisam	MWM	10,816	37.19	Syed Muhammad Ali Shah	PPP	10,251	35.25	565	53,022	29,803	56.21	
Skardu	GBA-9	Fida Muhammad Nashad (Note: On 9 July 2026, before he could be sworn in, Nashad was disqualified by the Supreme Appellate Court Gilgit-Baltistan.)	PPP	6,578	39.06	Wazir Muhammad Saleem	IND	6,353	37.73	225	33,649	17,622	52.37	
Skardu	GBA-10	Raja Nasir Ali Khan	PPP	6,773	29.87	Muhammad Khan Wazir	IPP	5,098	22.48	1,675	34,927	23,482	67.23	
Kharmang	GBA-11	Iqbal Hassan	PPP	6,143	34.10	Syed Mohsin Rizvi	PML(N)	4,847	26.91	1,296	34,670	18,620	53.71	
Shigar	GBA-12	Imran Nadeem	PPP	13,222	42.53	Raja Azam Khan Amacha	ITP	8,977	28.87	4,245	46,594	34,663	74.39	
Astore	GBA-13	Rana Farman Ali	PML(N)	8,058	37.02	Shahida Khursheed	PTI	7,256	33.33	802	44,056	22,260	50.53	
Astore	GBA-14	Rana Muhammad Farooq	PML(N)	7,058	35.15	Syed Muhammad Abbas	PPP	5,891	29.34	1,167	37,219	20,078	53.95	
Diamer	GBA-15	Muhammad Dilpazir	IND	6,033	20.56	Wali ur Rehman	JUI(F)	4,639	15.81	1,374	45,225	29,557	65.36	
Diamer	GBA-16	Ataullah	PPP	6,320	26.34	Imam Malik	IND	6,296	26.24	24	46,282	24,024	51.91	
Diamer	GBA-17	Muhammad Naseem	PPP	10,716	45.63	Rehmat Khaliq	JUI(F)	6,989	29.76	3,668	41,045	23,771	57.91	
Diamer	GBA-18	Malik Kifayatur Rehman	PML(N)	6,081	48.25	Gulbar Khan	IPP	5,447	43.22	634	27,368	12,678	46.32	
Ghizer	GBA-19	Syed Jalal Ali Shah	PPP	9,331	34.06	Zafar Muhammad	PML(N)	7,460	27.23	1,871	45,885	28,121	61.29	
Ghizer	GBA-20	Abdul Jahan	PML(N)	7,153	24.01	Nazir Ahmed	PPP	7,034	23.61	119	52,733	30,172	57.22	
Ghizer	GBA-21	Aman Ali	IND	9,978	39.48	Muhammad Ayub Shah	PPP	6,685	26.45	3,293	43,075	25,476	59.14	
Ghanche	GBA-22	Muhammad Ibrahim Sanai	PML(N)	10,136	47.18	Ashiq Hussain	PPP	9,498	44.21	638	36,778	21,483	58.41	
Ghanche	GBA-23	Anwar Ali	IND	13,161	67.20	Abdul Hameed	IND	4,148	21.18	9,013	35,924	19,586	54.52	
Ghanche	GBA-24	Asad Shafiq	IND	7,763	50.51	Muhammad Ismail	PPP	5,311	34.56	2,452	25,148	15,600	62.03	

=== Reserved seats ===
On 20 June 2026, the ECGB notified successful candidates on reserved seats for women and technocrats.

Reserved seat	Candidate	Party
Women	Kulsoom Jahangir	PPP
Women	Sadia Danish	PPP
Women	Sobia Jabeen	PPP
Women	Sajida Begum	PML(N)
Women	Jennifer Bahadur	PML(N)
Women	Dilshad Bano	IPP
Technocrats	Muhammad Sharif	PPP
Technocrats	Sahib Khan	PML(N)
Technocrats	Muhammad Ali	IPP

== Aftermath ==
As no party received an overall majority of 17 seats, negotiations were required to form a government. On 20 June 2026, in a press conference led by Amjad Hussain Azar and Hafiz Hafeezur Rehman, Pakistan People's Party (PPP) and Pakistan Muslim League (N) (PML(N)) announced a power-sharing agreement. Under the agreement, PPP would secure the offices of Chief Minister and Speaker, while PML(N) would secure the offices of Governor, Deputy Speaker, and Leader of the Opposition. Both parties would support the other in votes for the elected offices of Chief Minister, Speaker, and Deputy Speaker. On 21 June 2026, Istehkam-e-Pakistan Party (IPP) also announced its support for PPP, with former Chief Minister Gulbar Khan, the party's president in Gilgit-Baltistan, said that they "will join the PPP-led alliance".

On the morning of 22 June 2026, 30 newly elected members of the 4th Gilgit-Baltistan Assembly were sworn in by outgoing Speaker Nazir Ahmed. Due to ongoing legal and electoral proceedings, results for three general seats were still pending. Ahmed adjourned the assembly and returned at 4:00PM to announce the election schedule for the positions of Speaker and Deputy Speaker, giving candidates until 5:15PM to file nomination papers. Imran Nadeem of PPP and Malik Kifayatur Rehman of PML(N) had filed nomination papers for the position of Speaker and Deputy Speaker, respectively. Since no other candidate filed nomination papers, both were elected unopposed. Ahmed administered the oath of office to Nadeem, and Nadeem did so to Rehman. Nadeem then announced the election schedule for the position of Chief Minister, setting 07:40 pm as the nomination deadline. No other candidate but Amjad Hussain Azar filed nomination, and therefore, Nadeem announced at 08:00 pm that Azar was elected unopposed. Nadeem also announced Hafiz Hafeezur Rehman as the Leader of the Opposition, as opposition members had requested so.

On 6 July, Azar was administered the oath of office by Governor Syed Mehdi Shah in Gilgit.

On 9 July, before he could be sworn in, Fida Muhammad Nashad, the winning candidate of PPP from GBA-9 Skardu-III was disqualified by the Supreme Appellate Court Gilgit-Baltistan.

On 12 July, re-polling was held at one polling station in GBA-15 Diamer-I and eight polling stations in GBA-17 Diamer-III. Resultingly, Muhammad Dilpazir, an independent candidate who later joined IPP, won from GBA-15, and Muhammad Naseem, a candidate of PPP, won from GBA-17.

== See also ==
- 2026 Azad Kashmiri general election
