= List of members of the 3rd Assembly of Gilgit-Baltistan =

The 3rd Assembly of Gilgit Baltistan was elected on 15 November 2020 polls held across the province of Gilgit Baltistan. The party position and the distribution of reserved seats is shown below. The new session of the Gilgit-Baltistan Assembly had summoned on 25 November 2020. The assembly stood dissolved on 24 November 2025.

== Party Position ==
The below table shows party standings at the time of the assembly's dissolution.

Party	Members			Total
Party	General Seats	Reserved for Women	Reserved for Technocrats	Total
PTI	14	4	2	20
PPP	3	1	1	5
PML(N)	2	1	0	3
ITP	1	0	0	1
BNF	1	0	0	1
MWM	1	0	0	1
JUI(F)	1	0	0	1
Vacant	1	0	0	1
Total	23	6	3	33

== List of Members of the 3rd Assembly of Gilgit Baltistan ==
Members of the 3rd Assembly of Gilgit Baltistan are as follows:

Sr no.	Constituency	Name of Member	Party	Notes
1	GBA-1 Gilgit-I	Amjad Hussain Azar	PPP	Leader of the Opposition (November 2020 to July 2023)
2	GBA-2 Gilgit-II	Jameel Ahmed	PPP	
3	GBA-3 Gilgit-III	Syed Sohail Abbas Shah	PTI	
4	GBA-4 Nagar-I	Muhammad Ayub Waziri	ITP	
5	GBA-5 Nagar-II	Javed Ali Manwa	PTI†	
6	GBA-6 Hunza	Abaid Ullah Baig	PTI	
7	GBA-7 Skardu-I	Raja Zakaria Khan Maqpoon	PTI	
8	GBA-8 Skardu-II	Muhammad Kazim Maisam	MWM	Leader of the Opposition (July 2023 to November 2025)
9	GBA-9 Skardu-III	Wazir Muhammad Saleem	PTI†	
10	GBA-10 Skardu-IV	Raja Nasir Ali Khan Maqpoon	PTI†	
11	GBA-11 Kharmang	Syed Amjad Ali Zaidi	PTI	Speaker (November 2020 to June 2023)
12	GBA-12 Shigar	Raja Azam Khan Amacha	PTI	
13	GBA-13 Astore-I	Khalid Khurshid	PTI	Chief Minister (November 2020 to July 2023). Disqualified and de-seated on 4 July 2023.
13	GBA-13 Astore-I	Vacant		A by-election was held on 9 September 2023, but its results were annulled.Another by-election was never scheduled or held.
14	GBA-14 Astore-II	Shamsul Haq	PTI	
15	GBA-15 Diamer-I	Shah Baig	PTI†	
16	GBA-16 Diamer-II	Muhammad Anwar	PML(N)	
17	GBA-17 Diamer-III	Rehmat Khaliq	JUI(F)	
18	GBA-18 Diamer-IV	Gulbar Khan	PTI	Chief Minister (July 2023 to November 2025)
19	GBA-19 Ghizer-I	Nawaz Khan Naji	BNF(N)†	
20	GBA-20 Ghizer-II	Nazir Ahmed	PTI	Speaker (since June 2023); Deputy Speaker (November 2020 to June 2023)
21	GBA-21 Ghizer-III	Ghulam Muhammad	PML(N)	
22	GBA-22 Ghanche-I	Mushtaq Hussain	PTI†	
23	GBA-23 Ghanche-II	Abdul Hameed	PTI†	
24	GBA-24 Ghanche-III	Muhammad Ismail	PPP	
25	Reserved for Women	Kaneez Fatima	PTI⥾	
26	Reserved for Women	Surriya Muhammad Zaman	PTI	
27	Reserved for Women	Dilshad Bano	PTI	
28	Reserved for Women	Kulsoom Ilyas	PTI	
29	Reserved for Women	Sadia Danish	PPP	Deputy Speaker (July 2023 to November 2025)
30	Reserved for Women	Sanam Bibi	PML(N)	
31	Technocrats	Akbar Ali	PTI⥾	
32	Technocrats	Fazal Raheem	PTI	
33	Technocrats	Ghulam Shahzad	PPP	

†Elected as an Independent but joined the party after the election. ⥾Basic Member of Majlis Wahdat-e-Muslimeen
