= Government of Gilgit-Baltistan =

State government in Pakistani-administered Kashmir

Government of Gilgit-Baltistan: حکومتِ گلگت بلتستان; Hukūmat-e-Gilgit Baltistān
- Territorial Government
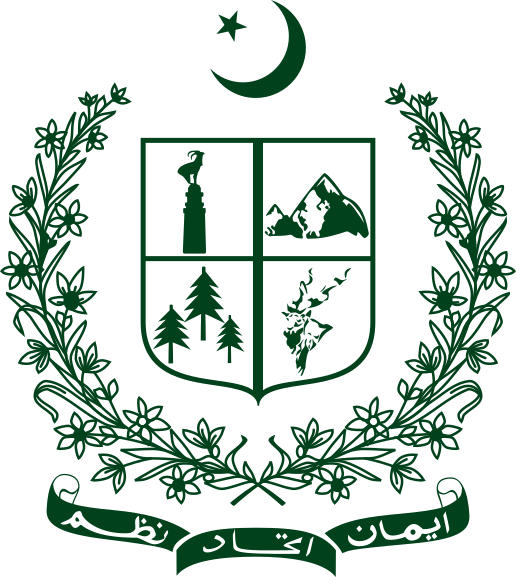
- Coat of arms of Gilgit-Baltistan
- Formation: 28 August 2011
- Constitutional instrument: Gilgit-Baltistan Empowerment and Self-Governance Order
- Territory: Gilgit-Baltistan
- Country: Pakistan
- Website: gilgitbaltistan.gov.pk

Legislative branch
- Legislature: Gilgit-Baltistan Assembly
- Speaker: Imran Nadeem
- Deputy Speaker: Malik Kifayatur Rehman
- Assembly members: 33 members
- Meeting place: Gilgit-Baltistan Assembly Building (Jutial, Gilgit)

Executive branch
- Governor: Syed Mehdi Shah
- Chief Minister: Amjad Hussain Azar
- Chief Secretary: Abrar Ahmed Mirza
- Headquarters: Gilgit
- Main organ: Cabinet

Judicial branch
- Court: Supreme Appellate Court Gilgit-Baltistan
- Chief Justice: Sardar Muhammad Shamim Khan
- Seat: Gilgit
- Appeals from: District courts of Gilgit-Baltistan

The Government of Gilgit-Baltistan (Urdu: حکومتِ گلگت بلتستان, romanized: Hukūmut-e-Gilgit Baltistān) is the government of the administrative territory of Gilgit-Baltistan, Pakistan. Its powers and structure are set out in the Gilgit-Baltistan Order 2018, which superseded the 2009 Gilgit-Baltistan Empowerment and Self-Governance Order, according to which ten districts come under its authority and jurisdiction. The government includes the cabinet, selected from members the Gilgit-Baltistan Assembly, and the non-political civil staff within each department. The province is governed by a unicameral legislature with the head of government known as the Chief Minister. The Chief Minister, invariably the leader of a political party represented in the Assembly, selects members of the cabinet. The Chief Minister and cabinet are thus responsible for the functioning of government and are entitled to remain in office so long as it maintains the confidence of the elected Assembly. The head of state of the province is known as the Governor. The terms Government of Gilgit-Baltistan or Gilgit-Baltistan Government are interchangeably used in official documents. The seat of government is in Gilgit, thus serving as the capital of the territory.

== History ==
=== Background ===
Following the first Kashmir war, the control of the territory now comprising Gilgit-Baltistan was transferred to the federal government in 1949 by the provisional government of Azad Kashmir set up by Pakistan. According to Pakistani analyst Ershad Mahmud, there were two reasons why administration was transferred: the region was inaccessible from Azad Kashmir, and because both the governments of Azad Kashmir and Pakistan were aware that the people of the region were in favour of joining Pakistan in a potential referendum over Kashmir's final status. The Indian journalist Paul Sahni sees this as an effort by Pakistan to legitimise its rule over Gilgit-Baltistan.

In August 1972, the Gilgit Agency, Baltistan — which, alongside Indian-administered Ladakh was formerly of the Ladakh Wazarat — and the hill states of Hunza and Nagar were amalgamated to form the Federally Administered Northern Areas, or Northern Areas for short. The territory was renamed Gilgit-Baltistan and granted self-government in 2009.

According to the International Crisis Group, the Karachi Agreement remains highly unpopular in Gilgit-Baltistan as Gilgit-Baltistan was not a party to it, even while it was its own fate was being decided. Following it and until 1970s, the Northern Areas were regulated by the Frontier Crimes Regulations; set up in colonial period, they treated tribal people harshly, levying collective fines and punishments. People had no right to legal representation or appeal. Members of tribes had to obtain prior permission from the police to travel anywhere, and had to keep the police informed about their movements. The people of Gilgit-Baltistan were deprived of rights enjoyed by citizens of Pakistan and Azad Kashmir. A position of 'Deputy Chief Executive' was created to act as the local administrator, but the real powers still rested with the 'Chief Executive', who was the Federal Minister of KANA. "The secretaries were more powerful than the concerned advisors," in the words of one commentator. In spite of various reforms packages over the years, the situation is essentially unchanged. Meanwhile, public rage in Gilgit-Baltistan "[grew] alarmingly." Prominent "antagonist groups" have mushroomed protesting the absence of civic rights and democracy. The Pakistani government has debated granting provincial status to Gilgit-Baltistan.

A primary reason for this state of affairs was the remoteness of Gilgit-Baltistan. Another factor was that the whole of Pakistan itself was deficient in democratic norms and principles, therefore the federal government did not prioritise democratic development in the region. There was also a lack of public pressure as an active civil society was absent in the region, with young educated residents usually opting to live in Pakistan's urban centers instead of staying in the region. The Government of Pakistan abolished State Subject Rule in Gilgit-Baltistan in 1974, which had prevented people from outside Gilgit Baltistan to buy land in the territory. In 1993, an attempt was made by the High Court of Azad Jammu and Kashmir to annex Gilgit-Baltistan but was quashed by the Supreme Court of Pakistan after protests by the locals of Gilgit-Baltistan, who feared domination by the Kashmiris. In 1994, a Legal Framework Order (LFO) was created by the KANA Ministry to serve as the de facto constitution for the region.

In the late 1990s, the President of Al-Jihad Trust filed a petition in the Supreme Court of Pakistan to determine the legal status of Gilgit-Baltistan. In its judgement of 28 May 1999, the Court directed the Government of Pakistan to ensure the provision of equal rights to the people of Gilgit-Baltistan, and gave it six months to do so. Following the Supreme Court decision, the government took several steps to devolve power to the local level. However, in several policy circles, the point was raised that the Pakistani government was helpless to comply with the court verdict because of the strong political and sectarian divisions in Gilgit-Baltistan and also because of the territory's historical connection with the still disputed Kashmir region, and that this prevented the determination of Gilgit-Baltistan's real status.

Gilgit-Baltistan has been a member state of the Unrepresented Nations and Peoples Organization since 2008. According to Antia Mato Bouzas, the PPP-led Pakistani government has attempted a compromise through its 2009 reforms between its traditional stand on the Kashmir dispute and the demands of locals, most of whom may have pro-Pakistan sentiments. While the 2009 reforms have added to the self-identification of the region, they have not resolved the constitutional status of the region within Pakistan.

As relayed by 2010 news reports, the people of Gilgit-Baltistan desire representation as a separate province within Pakistan. In July 2015, the then Prime Minister of Azad Jammu & Kashmir (AJK), Chaudhry Abdul Majid, opposed the move, preferring instead integration within a Kashmir province. Many of the people of Gilgit-Baltistan have, however, expressed desires for Pakistani citizenship and a constitutional status for their region as distinct from Kashmir.

=== Gilgit-Baltistan Empowerment and Self-Governance Order 2009 ===
While administratively controlled by Pakistan since 1947, Gilgit-Baltistan has not yet been formally integrated into the Pakistani federation state and does not participate in constitutional political affairs. On 29 August 2009, the Gilgit-Baltistan Empowerment and Self-Governance Order 2009 was passed by the Government of Pakistan and later signed by the President. The order granted self-rule to the people of Gilgit-Baltistan, by creating, among other things, an elected Gilgit-Baltistan Legislative Assembly and a Gilgit-Baltistan Council. Gilgit-Baltistan thus gained de facto province-like status without constitutionally becoming part of Pakistan.

=== The Gilgit-Baltistan Order 2018 ===
In 2018, the federal cabinet passed The Gilgit-Baltistan Order 2018, which notably relegated the roles formally exercised by the Gilgit-Baltistan Council to the elected Assembly, although it still delegated much executive powers to the office of Prime Minister of Pakistan.

=== The 26th Amendment for the Provisional Provincial status ===
In September 2020, the then Pakistani prime minister Imran Khan announced that Gilgit-Baltistan would attain provisional provincial status after the 2020 Gilgit-Baltistan Assembly election.

The Law Ministry of Pakistan recently finalised the draft of the 26th Amendment to the Constitution, submitting it to the prime minister for review. The proposed legislation is aimed at awarding GB provisional provincial status, and is expected to be presented in parliament for debate. If passed by a two-thirds majority in parliament, Gilgit-Baltistan would likely be given the status of province through an amendment in Article 1 of the Constitution. The 26th Amendment would empower Gilgit-Baltistan as per the other provinces of Pakistan without jeopardizing Pakistan's stance about the Kashmir conflict.

As of now the work on the legislation about the provisional provincial status has been slowed down due to the recent political unrest in Pakistan.

== Executive ==
The government of Gilgit Baltistan consists of an elected body, with the Governor as the constitutional head. The Chief Minister is elected by the Assembly to serve as the head of the provincial government in Gilgit-Baltistan. Whereas, the Chief Secretary, Gilgit-Baltistan is usually an officer of grade BPS-21 or 22 from the Pakistan Administrative Service, who acts as an administrative head of the Gilgit-Baltistan.

=== Departments ===
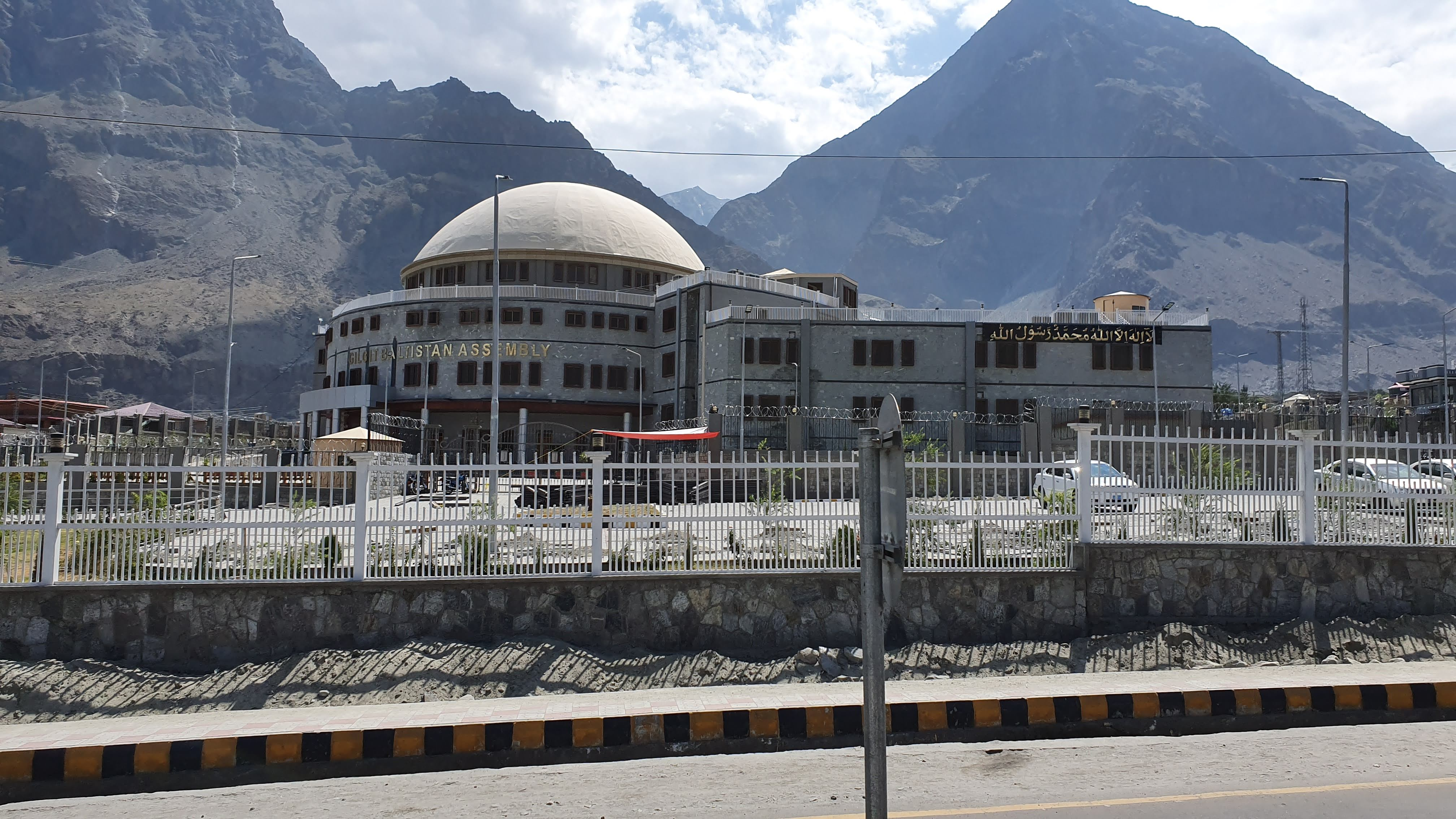
Gilgit Baltistan Assembly building

The Executive consists of several departments. Each or two of these departments mix up to form a ministry. Each of the ministry is headed by the elected minister or a technocrat appointed by the Chief Minister and a provincial secretary of BPS-20 grade officer of the Pakistan Administrative Service.

- Home & Prisons Department
- Finance Department
- Law and Prosecution Department
- Services and General Administration, Information and Cabinet Department
- Revenue, Usher and Zakat, Excise and Taxation and Cooperative Department
- Food and Agriculture, Fisheries and Animal Husbandry Department
- Forest, Wildlife and Environment Department
- Education, Social Welfare and Women Development
- Health and Population Welfare Department
- Works Department
- Local Government, Rural Development and Census Department
- Water and Power Department
- Tourism, Sports, Culture and Youth Department
- Mineral Development, Industries, Commerce & Labour Department
- Planning and Development Department

== Cabinet ==
Amjad Hussain Azar took oath as the Chief Minister on 6 July 2026. On 22 July, his recommendations for the cabinet was approved by the Governor and the Assembly issued a formal notification.

Name	Portfolio	Party	Constituency	From
Amjad Hussain Azar	Chief Minister of Gilgit-Baltistan	PPP	Gilgit-I	6 July 2026
Muhammad Ali Akhtar	Finance	PPP	GBA-4 Nagar-I	27 July 2026
Iqbal Hassan	Health	PPP	GBA-11 Kharmang	27 July 2026
Raja Nasir Ali Khan Maqpoon	Forests, Wildlife, Parks, and Environment Agriculture, Fisheries, and Animal Husbandry	PPP	GBA-10 Skardu-IV	27 July 2026
Syed Jalal Ali Shah	Planning and Development	PPP	GBA-19 Ghizer-I	27 July 2026
Muhammad Naseem	Communication and Works	PPP	GBA-17 Diamer-III	27 July 2026
Syed Tauqeer Mehdi	TBD	PPP	GBA-7 Skardu-I	5 August 2026
Naik Nam Karim	Tourism, Sports, Culture, and Heritage	PPP	GBA-6 Hunza	27 July 2026
Syed Sohail Abbas Shah	Local Government and Rural Development	MQM-P	GBA-5 Nagar-II	31 August 2026
Muhammad Dilpazir	TBD	IPP	GBA-15 Diamer-I	5 August 2026
Aman Ali	TBD	IPP	GBA-21 Ghizer-III	5 August 2026
Asad Shafiq	TBD	IPP	GBA-24 Ghanche-III	5 August 2026
Anwar Ali	TBD	IPP	GBA-23 Ghanche-II	5 August 2026

== Legislature ==
The Gilgit-Baltistan Assembly is a 33-seat unicameral legislative body. It has 24 directly elected members, 6 reserved seats are for women and 3 reserved seats are for technocrats. The current Assembly is the fourth elected assembly of the region, that came into being as a result of the 2026 Gilgit Baltistan Assembly election.

Since the proclamation of 2009 Gilgit-Baltistan Empowerment and Self Governance Order there have been three assemblies that successfully completed their constitutional tenures. The first assembly lasted from 2009 to 2015 in which PPP was in power. The second assembly lasted from 2015 to 2020 in which PMLN government was in power. The third assembly lasted from 2020 to 2025, in which PTI was initially in power, but, after its fall, was followed by a coalition government between PPP, PML(N), and a forward bloc of PTI. The fourth assembly began in 2026, and PPP is currently in power.

== Gilgit-Baltistan Council ==
The Gilgit-Baltistan Council has been established as per Article 33 of Gilgit-Baltistan (Empowerment & Self Governance) Order, 2009. Its chairman is the Prime Minister of Pakistan while the Governor of Gilgit-Baltistan is the Vice-Chairman. It can legislate on 53 subjects as provided in Schedule III of the Order. Other members include Chief Minister of Gilgit-Baltistan, six members which are nominated by Prime Minister of Pakistan and six members which are elected by Gilgit-Baltistan Legislative Assembly. The 2018 Gilgit-Baltistan Order relegated the role previously exercised by the Council to the Assembly.

== Judiciary ==
In the light of a verdict by Supreme Court of Pakistan in the case filed by Wahab Al Kahiri, Justice Shehbaz Khan and others through Al-Jehad Trust Versus Federation of Pakistan, as per orders of Supreme Court of Pakistan, the Government of Pakistan established Northern Areas Court of Appeals at Gilgit vide Gazette of Pakistan, extraordinary, part II dated 8 November 1999 with Appellate Jurisdiction. The Court started function on 27 September 2005, when the Chairman and members were appointed. On 15 December 2007 by virtue of amendments in the Northern Areas Governance order 1994, the nomenclature of the Court was re-designated as Northern Areas Supreme Appellate Court and its jurisdiction was also enlarged by conferring original and appellate jurisdiction. It was also given the status equal to the Supreme Court of Azad Jammu and Kashmir. It was renamed as Supreme Appellate Court Gilgit-Baltistan in 2009.

=== Supreme Appellate Court Gilgit-Baltistan ===
On 9 September 2009, the Supreme Appellate Court was conferred the similar jurisdiction equal to the Supreme Court of Pakistan by promulgating Gilgit-Baltistan (Empowerment and Self Governance Order) 2009. The Supreme Appellate Court consists of a chief judge and two judges. The permanent seat of the court is at Gilgit, but the court also sits from time to time at Skardu Branch Registry.

=== Gilgit-Baltistan Chief Court ===
Gilgit-Baltistan Chief Court is the court of appeal and is equivalent to other provincial high courts according to Gilgit-Baltistan Empowerment and Self-Governance Order 2009.

== See also ==
- Government of Punjab, Pakistan
- Government of Khyber Pakhtunkhwa
- Government of Sindh
- Government of Azad Kashmir
- Government of Balochistan, Pakistan

== Sources ==
- "Discord in Pakistan's Northern Areas" (PDF). Asia Report. Brussels: International Crisis Group. 2 April 2007. N°131. Archived from the original (PDF) on 20 May 2016.
- Mahmud, Ershad (2008). "The Gilgit-Baltistan Reforms Package 2007: Background, Phases and Analysis". Policy Perspectives. 5 (1): 23–40. JSTOR 42909184.
- Sahni, Paul (2009). "The Ceasefire Line and Line of Control in Jammu and Kashmir: Evolution of a border". In K. Warikoo (ed.). Himalayan Frontiers of India: Historical, Geo-Political and Strategic Perspectives. Routledge. pp. 67–77. ISBN 978-1-134-03294-5.
- Bansal, Alok (2007). "In Pursuit of Forced Assimilation: Sectarian and Ethnic Marginalisation in Gilgit-Baltistan". India Quarterly: A Journal of International Affairs. 63 (2): 56–80. doi:10.1177/097492840706300203. S2CID 153450836.
- Singh, Priyanka (2013). Gilgit Baltistan: Between Hope and Despair. New Delhi: Institute for Defence Studies and Analyses. ISBN 978-93-82169-13-0. Archived from the original on 12 March 2016.
- Raman, B. (2009). "The Northern Areas of Jammu and Kashmir". In K. Warikoo (ed.). Himalayan Frontiers of India: Historical, Geo-Political and Strategic Perspectives. Routledge. pp. 78–88. ISBN 978-1-134-03294-5.
- Behera, Navnita Chadha (2007). Demystifying Kashmir. Pearson Education India. ISBN 978-81-317-0846-0. Archived from the original on 17 January 2023.
