= List of people from Gilgit-Baltistan =

Following is a list of notable people from Gilgit-Baltistan, Pakistan:

== Authors ==
- Nasir al-Din Nasir Hunzai, Burushaski writer
- Ghulam Hassan Lobsang, Balti writer
- Yusuf Hussain Abadi, Balti writer
- Nazir Ahmad Bulbul, Wakhi writer

== Aviation ==
- Amen Aamir

== Royalty ==
- Ali Sher Khan Anchan, ruler of Skardu
- Gohar Aman, ruler of Yasin
- Mohammad Jamal Khan, Mir of Hunza
- Mir Shaukat Ali Khan, Mir of Nagar
- Dadi Jawari, ruler of Gilgit

== Religious leaders ==
- Mir Mukhtar Akhyar
- Abdul Rahim Yugovi
- Syed Muhammad Shah Noorani

== Journalists ==
- Muhammad Bilal Khan

== Military ==
- Shah Rais Khan, known for his role in First Indo-Pakistani War
- Babar Khan, known for his role in First Indo-Pakistani War
- Mirza Hassan Khan, known for his role in First Indo-Pakistani War
- Lalak Jan, recipient of Pakistan's highest military award Nishan-e-Haider

== Politicians ==
- Shama Khalid, governor of Gilgit-Baltistan
- Wazir Baig, governor of Gilgit-Baltistan
- Karam Ali Shah, governor of Gilgit-Baltistan
- Jalal Hussain Maqpoon, governor of Gilgit-Baltistan
- Syed Mehdi Shah, governor of Gilgit-Baltistan
- Mir Ghazanfar Ali Khan, governor of Gilgit-Baltistan
- Sher Jehan Mir, Chief Minister of Gilgit-Baltistan
- Hafiz Hafeezur Rehman, Chief Minister of Gilgit-Baltistan
- Mir Afzal, Chief Minister of Gilgit-Baltistan
- Khalid Khurshid, Chief Minister of Gilgit-Baltistan
- Gulbar Khan, Chief Minister of Gilgit-Baltistan
- Yar Muhammad, Chief Minister of Gilgit-Baltistan
- Syed Yahya Shah, politician from Nagar
- Nawaz Khan Naji, politician from Ghizer

== Sports ==
- Ali Sadpara, mountaineer
- Sajid Sadpara, mountaineer
- Sirbaz Khan, mountaineer
- Samina Baig, mountaineer
- Meherban Karim, mountaineer
- Muhammad Karim, mountaineer
- Muhammad Karim, skier
- Amir Mehdi, mountaineer
