= List of members of the 1st Assembly of Gilgit-Baltistan =

The 1st Assembly of Gilgit-Baltistan was elected on 12 November 2009 by polls held across the province of Gilgit-Baltistan. That Assembly completed a full five-year term from December 2009 to 2015.

Members of the assembly took oath on 10 December 2009.

== Party position ==
Party	Members
Pakistan People's Party	20
Jamiat Ulema Islam F	4
Pakistan Muslim League Q	3
Pakistan Muslim League N	2
Independents	2
Muttahida Qaumi Movement	1
Balwaristan National Front	1
Total	33

== List of members of the 1st Assembly of Gilgit-Baltistan. ==
Members of the 1st Assembly of Gilgit-Baltistan are shown below

Sr no.	Constituency	Name of member	Party	Notes
1	GBLA-1	Syed Raziuddin Rizvi	IND	
2	GBLA-2	Deedar Ali	IND	
3	GBLA-3	Aftab Haider	PPP	
4	GBLA-4	Muhammad Ali Akhtar	PPP	
5	GBLA-5	Mirza Hussain	PML Q	
6	GBLA-6	Wazir Baig	PPP	Speaker
7	GBLA-7	Syed Mehdi Shah	PPP	Chief Minister
8	GBLA-8	Sheikh Nisar	PPP	
9	GBLA-9	Wazir Shakil Ahmed	PPP	
10	GBLA-10	Wazir Hassan	PPP	
11	GBLA-11	Syed Muhammad Ali Shah Rizvi	PPP	
12	GBLA-12	Raja Muhammad Azam Khan	MQM	
13	GBLA-13	Abdul Hameed Khan	PPP	
14	GBLA-14	Muhammad Naseer	PPP	
15	GBLA-15	Bashir Ahmed Khan	PML Q	
16	GBLA-16	Janbaz Khan	PML N	
17	GBLA-17	Gulbar Khan	JUI F	
18	GBLA-18	Rehmat Khaliq	JUI F	
19	GBLA-19	Nawaz Khan Naji	BNF	
20	GBLA-20	Ali Madad Sher	PPP	
21	GBLA-21	Muhammad Ayub Shah	PPP	
22	GBLA-22	Muhammad Jaffer	PPP	
23	GBLA-23	Mufti Muhammad Abdullah	PML N	
24	GBLA-24	Engr Muhammad Ismail	PPP	
25	Reserved for women	Sadia Danish	PPP	
26	Reserved for women	Gul Mira	PPP	
27	Reserved for women	Yasmin Nazar	PPP	
28	Reserved for women	Shereen Fatima	PPP	
29	Reserved for women	Mehnaz Wali	JUI F	
30	Reserved for women	Amna Ansari	PML Q	
31	Reserved for Technocrats and Professionals	Jamil Ahmed	PPP	Deputy speaker
32	Reserved for Technocrats and Professionals	Ghulam Hussain	PPP	
33	Reserved for Technocrats and Professionals	Molana Sarwar Shah	JUI F	
