= Elections in Gilgit-Baltistan =

Pakistani administrative territory elections

Elections in Gilgit-Baltistan, an administrative territory of Pakistan, are held under Gilgit-Baltistan Order 2018. The Election Commission Gilgit-Baltistan is responsible of conducting elections in Gilgit-Baltistan. Since 2009, four provincial elections have been conducted.

The Gilgit-Baltistan Assembly is the unicameral legislature of Gilgit-Baltistan. It consists of 33 members, elected on twenty-four general seats, six seats reserved for women, and three for technocrats.

Gilgit-Baltistan does not have representation in the Parliament of Pakistan because of its link to Kashmir conflict, although bills have been submitted in the Senate of Pakistan to give it an interim provincial status.

== Assembly Elections ==
Assembly Elections are conducted in every five years. Since 2009, four elections have been conducted. Results of each elections with maps are shown below:

2009 Gilgit-Baltistan Assembly election
Party	General	Women	Technocrats	Total	+/-
Pakistan Peoples Party	12	4	2	20	new
Jamiat Ulema Islam F	2	1	1	4	new
Pakistan Muslim League (Q)	2	1	0	3	new
Pakistan Muslim League (N)	2	0	0	2	new
Independents	2	0	0	2	new
Muttahida Qaumi Movement Pakistan	1	0	0	1	new
Balwaristan National Front	1	0		1	new
Total	24	6	3	33	

2015 Gilgit-Baltistan Assembly election
Party	General	Women	Technocrats	Total	+/-
Pakistan Muslim League (N)	15	4	2	21	▲19
Islami Tehreek Pakistan	2	1	1	4	▲4
Majlis Wahdat-e-Muslimeen	2	1	0	3	▲3
Pakistan Tehreek-e-Insaf	1	0	0	1	▲1
Pakistan Peoples Party	1	0	0	1	▼19
Jamiat Ulema Islam F	1	0	0	1	▼3
Independents	1	0	0	1	▼1
Balwaristan National Front	1	0	0	1	
Total	24	6	3	33	

2020 Gilgit-Baltistan Assembly election
Party	General	Women	Technocrats	Total	+/-
Pakistan Tehreek-e-Insaf	16	4	2	22	▲21
Pakistan Peoples Party	3	1	1	5	▲4
Pakistan Muslim League (N)	2	1	0	3	▼18
Majlis Wahdat-e-Muslimeen	1	0	0	1	▼2
Jamiat Ulema Islam F	1	0	0	1	Steady
Balwaristan National Front	1	0	0	1	Steady
Total	24	6	3	33	
