= Cabinet of Gilgit-Baltistan =

Government cabinet in Pakistan

Office	Name	Party	Term
Chief Minister	Amjad Hussain Azar	PPP	6 July 2026 – Present
Minister for Finance	Muhammad Ali Akhtar	PPP	27 July 2026 – Present
Minister for Health	Iqbal Hassan	PPP	27 July 2026 – Present
Minister for Forests, Wildlife, Parks, and Environment; Minister for Agriculture, Fisheries, and Animal Husbandry	Raja Nasir Ali Khan Maqpoon	PPP	27 July 2026 – Present
Minister for Planning and Development	Syed Jalal Ali Shah	PPP	27 July 2026 – Present
Minister for Communication and Works	Muhammad Naseem	PPP	27 July 2026 – Present
Minister for Water and Power Department	Syed Tauqeer Mehdi	PPP	5 August 2026 – Present
Minister for Tourism, Sports, Culture, and Heritage	Naik Nam Karim	PPP	27 July 2026 – Present
Minister for Local Government and Rural Development	Zulfiqar Ali Murad	PPP	27 July 2026 – Present
Minister for Home, Police and Prisons	Muhammad Dilpazir	IPP	5 August 2026 – Present
Minister for School Education	Aman Ali	IPP	5 August 2026 – Present
Minister for Minerals, Industries, Labour and Commerce; Minister for Higher, Technical and Special Education	Asad Shafiq	IPP	5 August 2026 – Present
Minister for Agriculture, Livestock and Fisheries	Anwar Ali	IPP	5 August 2026 – Present

The Cabinet of Gilgit-Baltistan is the cabinet of the government of Gilgit-Baltistan in Pakistan. The cabinet consists of twelve ministers, and the chief minister of Gilgit-Baltistan.
