= Muhammad Kazim Maisam =

Pakistani politician from Gilgit-Baltistan

- محمد کاظم میثم

Leader of the Opposition of the Gilgit Baltistan Assembly
- In office 19 July 2023 – 24 November 2025
- Preceded by: Amjad Hussain Azar
- Succeeded by: Hafiz Hafeezur Rehman

Member of the Gilgit Baltistan Assembly
- Incumbent
- Assumed office 22 June 2026
- Preceded by: Himself
- Constituency: GBA-8 Skardu-II
- In office 25 November 2020 – 24 November 2025
- Preceded by: Imtiaz Haider Khan
- Succeeded by: Himself
- Constituency: GBA-8 Skardu-II

Provincial Minister for Agriculture
- In office 2 December 2020 – 4 July 2023
- Chief Minister: Khalid Khurshid
- Succeeded by: Muhammad Anwar

Provincial Minister for Food
- In office 2 February 2023 – 4 July 2023
- Chief Minister: Khalid Khurshid
- Succeeded by: Ghulam Muhammad

Personal details
- Party: MWM (2020-present)

Muhammad Kazim Maisam (Urdu: محمد کاظم میثم) is a Pakistani politician who has been a member of the Gilgit Baltistan Assembly since June 2026. He previously served in this role from November 2020 to November 2025.

== Political career ==
Maisam contested the 2020 Gilgit-Baltistan Assembly election on 15 November 2020 from GBA-8 Skardu-II on the ticket from Majlis Wahdat-e-Muslimeen (MWM). He won the election by the margin of 976 votes over the runner-up Muhammad Ali Shah of Pakistan Peoples Party (PPP). He garnered 7,988 votes while Shah received 7,012 votes.

On 2 December 2020, he was inducted into the cabinet of Chief Minister Khalid Khurshid as the Minister for Agriculture. On 2 February 2023, he was also made the Minister for Food.

On 19 July 2023, he was unanimously elected as the Leader of the Opposition in the Gilgit-Baltistan Assembly. The position had become vacant as Amjad Hussain Azar, the previous Leader of the Opposition, had joined the government after the appointment of Gulbar Khan as the Chief Minister.

He was re-elected to the Gilgit-Baltistan Assembly from GBA-8 Skardu-II as a candidate of MWM in the 2026 Gilgit Baltistan Assembly election. He received 10,816 votes and defeated Syed Muhammad Ali Shah, a candidate of PPP.
