= Syed Sohail Abbas Shah =

Pakistani politician from Gilgit-Baltistan

- سید سہیل عباس شاہ

Member of the Gilgit Baltistan Assembly
- Incumbent
- Assumed office 22 June 2026
- Constituency: GBA-3 Gilgit-III
- In office 25 November 2020 – 24 November 2025
- Constituency: GBA-3 Gilgit-III

Provincial Minister for Health, Law & Parliamentary Affairs
- In office 2 December 2020 – 18 May 2024
- Chief Minister: Khalid Khurshid; Gulbar Khan

Personal details
- Born: Gilgit
- Party: PTI (2020-present)

Syed Sohail Abbas Shah is a Pakistani politician who has been a member of the Gilgit Baltistan Assembly since June 2026, and also held this role from November 2020 to November 2025. He was the Minister of Law & Parliamentary Affairs and Board of Revenue in Government of Gilgit Baltistan from December 2020 until his resignation in May 2024.

== Political career ==
Shah contested the 2020 Gilgit-Baltistan Assembly by-election on 22 November 2020 from GBA-3 Gilgit-III on the ticket of the Pakistan Tehreek-e-Insaf (PTI). He won GBA-3 Gilgit-III by the margin of 2,195 votes over the Independent runner up Muhammad Iqbal. He garnered 6,873 votes while Iqbal received 4,678 votes. The election for this GBA-3 Gilgit-III was held one week after the rest of the region due to the death of Shah's father, Syed Jaffar Shah, on 11 October 2020. His father was the president of PTI's Gilgit-Baltistan chapter, and was contesting the election from GBA-3 Gilgit-III as a candidate of PTI.

He was appointed to Chief Minister Khalid Khurshid's cabinet as a Provincial Minister for Law & Parliamentary Affairs and Board of Revenue on 2 December 2020. After the election of fall of Khurshid's government and election of Gulbar Khan as Chief Minister, Shah was re-appointed as the Provincial Minister for Law, Health, and Parliamentary Affairs. He resigned from this position on 18 May 2024.

He was re-elected to the Gilgit-Baltistan Assembly from GBA-3 Gilgit-III as an independent candidate supported by PTI in the 2026 Gilgit Baltistan Assembly election. He received 8,060 votes and defeated Aftab Haider, a candidate of Pakistan People's Party (PPP).
