= Dilshad Bano =

Pakistani politician from Gilgit-Baltistan

- دلشاد بانو

Member of the Gilgit-Baltistan Assembly
- Incumbent
- Assumed office 22 June 2026
- Constituency: Reserved seat for women
- In office 25 November 2020 – 24 November 2025
- Constituency: Reserved seat for women

Minister for Women's Development, Gilgit-Baltistan
- In office 18 July 2023 – 24 November 2025
- Chief Minister: Gulbar Khan

Personal details
- Party: Istehkam-e-Pakistan Party (2026-present)
- Other party: Pakistan Tehreek-e-Insaf (2020-2025)

Dilshad Bano is a Pakistani politician who has served as a member of the Gilgit-Baltistan Assembly since June 2026, and previously served in this role from November 2020 to November 2025. She also served as the region's Minister for Women's Development from July 2023 to November 2025.

== Political career ==
Bano was elected to the Gilgit-Baltistan Assembly on a reserved seat for women as a candidate of Pakistan Tehreek-e-Insaf (PTI) in the 2020 Gilgit-Baltistan Assembly election.

On 18 July 2023, she was sworn into the cabinet of Chief Minister Gulbar Khan, and was given the portfolio of Women's Development.

On 7 September 2025, her PTI membership was terminated for "forming a forward bloc and voting against the party" in the election of Gulbar Khan as Chief Minister.

On 11 February 2026, she joined Istehkam-e-Pakistan Party (IPP).

She was re-elected to the Gilgit-Baltistan Assembly on a reserved seat for women as a candidate of IPP in the 2026 Gilgit Baltistan Assembly election.
