= Sobia Jabeen =

Pakistani politician from Gilgit-Baltistan

- ثوبیہ جبین

Member of the Gilgit-Baltistan Assembly
- Incumbent
- Assumed office 22 June 2026
- Constituency: Reserved seat for women
- In office 24 June 2015 – 23 June 2020
- Constituency: Reserved seat for women

Personal details
- Party: Pakistan People's Party (2023-present)
- Other political affiliations: Independent (2026); Pakistan Tehreek-e-Insaf (2020-2023); Pakistan Muslim League (N) (2015-2020)

Sobia Jabeen is a Pakistani politician who has served as a member of the Gilgit-Baltistan Assembly since June 2026, and previously served in this role from June 2015 to June 2020. She also served as the Minister for Women's Development, Youth Affairs, and Culture from July 2015 to April 2019.

== Political career ==
Jabeen was elected to the Gilgit-Baltistan Assembly on a reserved seat for women as a candidate of Pakistan Muslim League (N) (PML(N)) in the 2015 Gilgit-Baltistan Assembly election.

On 7 July 2015, she was sworn into the cabinet of Chief Minister Hafiz Hafeezur Rehman as the Minister for Women's Development, Youth Affairs, and Culture. Rehman removed her from her position due to "excessive absences" from official meetings and a "lack of interest" in government affairs. However, ten days prior, she, along with two other ministers, criticized the government, calling it a "one-man show" by Rehman.

On 8 September 2020, she joined Pakistan Tehreek-e-Insaf (PTI).

She was re-elected to the Gilgit-Baltistan Assembly on a reserved seat for women as a candidate of Pakistan People's Party (PPP) in the 2026 Gilgit Baltistan Assembly election. In the same election, she contested a general seat from GBA-18 Diamer-IV as an independent candidate, but was unusccessful. She received 42 votes and was defeated by Malik Kifayatur Rehman, a candidate of PML(N).
