= Election Commission Gilgit-Baltistan =

Constitutional body in Gilgit-Baltistan, Pakistan

Election Commission, Gilgit-Baltistan انتخابی ماموریہ گلگت بلتستان
- ECGB

Agency overview
- Formed: 2009; 17 years ago
- Jurisdiction: Gilgit-Baltistan
- Headquarters: Gilgit, Gilgit-Baltistan
- Motto: Free, Fair, Impartial
- Agency executives: Raja Shah Baz Khan, Chief Election Commissioner; Abid Raza, Member
- Website: ecgb.gov.pk/index.htm

The Election Commission Gilgit-Baltistan (Urdu: انتخابی ماموریہ گلگت بلتستان; ECGB) is an independent, autonomous, permanent and constitutionally established body responsible for organizing and conducting elections to the Gilgit-Baltistan Legislative Assembly and local governments, Gilgit-Baltistan Council, as well as the delimitation of constituencies and preparation of electoral rolls.

== History ==
Gilgit-Baltistan Election Commission was established as a unique and constitutional institution after the Gilgit-Baltistan's Empowerment and Self Governance Order 2009, was published. On October 20, 2009, Rahim Nawaz Khan Durrani became the first Chief Election Commissioner of Gilgit-Baltistan.

== Function and duties ==
The Gilgit-Baltistan's Empowerment and Self Governance Order 2009 defines and establishes the roles and responsibilities of the Election Commission Gilgit-Baltistan (ECGB), which gives the commission the following responsibilities:

- Preparation and yearly evaluation of voting data for the Gilgit-Baltistan Legislative Assembly elections
- Filling temporary vacancies in the legislative assembly or house as well as organizing and conducting elections for the Gilgit-Baltistan Legislative Assembly.
- Planning and holding elections for local body government institutions is required.
- Tribunals for elections must be appointed.
- Upon receiving a referral from the Speaker or the leader of the political party, as appropriate, to decide instances of legislative assembly members' disqualification under the Gilgit-Empowerment Baltistan's and Self Governance Order 2009.
- To plan and execute the 2009 Gilgit-Baltistan Empowerment and Self-Government Order's provisions for the election of the Gilgit-Baltistan Council.
- Referendums must take place as and when ordered by the Governor of Gilgit-Baltistan.

== Organogram ==
The ECGB consists of the Chief Election Commissioner, who shall act as the chairman and one member. The Prime Minister of Pakistan appointed the Chief Election Commissioner under any applicable rules and guidelines, on the advice of the Governor of Gilgit-Baltistan and in consultation with the Chief Minister of Gilgit-Baltistan.

=== Chief Election Commissioner ===
The Chief Election Commissioner, who has been appointed by the Prime Minister of Pakistan, must take an oath in the manner described in the First Schedule before taking office before the Chief Judge of Gilgit-Baltistan. The Chief Election Commissioner holds office for a term of three years starting on the day he assumes his duties. The Prime Minister of Pakistan may choose to extend the Chief Election Commissioner's term for an additional year.

=== Current composition ===
No.	Name	Office	Tenure
1	Khana Shah Baz Khan	Chief Election Commissioner	
2	Abid Raza	Member	

== Judicial review ==
Judicial review may be requested in the Chief Court of Gilgit Baltistan and Supreme Appellate Court of Gilgit-Baltistan in the event that an Election Commission Gilgit-Baltistan decision has a jurisdictional flaw, was made in bad faith, or is coram non judice, which means it was made outside of the court's jurisdiction.

== See also ==
- Election Commission of Pakistan
- Azad Jammu & Kashmir Election Commission
- Government of Gilgit-Baltistan
- Gilgit-Baltistan Council
