= Jennifer Bahadur =

Pakistani politician from Gilgit-Baltistan

- جینیفر بہادر

Member of the Gilgit-Baltistan Assembly
- Incumbent
- Assumed office 22 June 2026
- Constituency: Reserved seat for women

Personal details
- Party: Pakistan Muslim League (N)

Jennifer Bahadur is a Pakistani politician who has served as a member of the Gilgit-Baltistan Assembly since June 2026.

== Political career ==
Bahadur was allocated a reserved seat for women in the Gilgit-Baltistan Assembly as a candidate of the Pakistan Muslim League (N) (PML(N)) following the 2026 Gilgit Baltistan Assembly election
