= Rana Shamim =

Pakistani jurist

Rana Muhammad Shamim
- رانا محمد شمیم

Chief Judge of the Appellate court of the Supreme Appellate Court Gilgit-Baltistan
- In office August 2015 – 2018

Chief Justice of Sindh High Court
- In office unknown–unknown

Personal details
- Occupation: Judge

Rana Muhammad Shamim (Urdu: رانا محمد شمیم) is a former Pakistani judge who served as chief judge of the Appellate court of the Supreme Appellate Court Gilgit-Baltistan from August 2015 to 2018. He has also been the Chief Justice of Sindh High Court.
