= GBA-3 Gilgit-III =

Constituency for the Gilgit Baltistan Assembly

- Constituency for the Gilgit Baltistan Assembly
- District: Gilgit District
- Electorate: 34,103

Current constituency
- Created: 2009

GBA-3 Gilgit-III is a constituency of Gilgit Baltistan Assembly currently represented by the Syed Sohail Abbas Shah of Pakistan Tehreek-e-Insaf.

== Members ==
Election	Member	Party	Votes received
2009	Aftab Haider	Pakistan Peoples Party	6,214
2015	Doctor Muhammad Iqbal	Pakistan Muslim League (N)	7,852
2020	Syed Sohail Abbas Shah	Pakistan Tehreek-e-Insaf	6,807
2026	Syed Sohail Abbas Shah	Independent (Note: PTI members who contested in the general election ran as independent candidates aligned with the party because the Election Commission Gilgit-Baltistan prohibited the PTI election symbol.)	8,060

== Election results ==
Aftab Haider of Pakistan Peoples Party won by 6,214 votes.

2009 election
Party	Candidate	Votes	%
PPPP	Aftab Haider	6,214	30.05
MQM	Capt(Rtd.) Hadi Hussain	4,064	19.65
Independent	Capt(Rtd.) Muhammad Shafi	3,826	18.51
	Others	7,112	34.39
Turnout		20,676	60.68
PPP win (new seat)			

=== 2015 ===
Doctor Muhammad Iqbal of Pakistan Muslim League (N) won by getting 7,852 votes.

2015 election
Party	Candidate	Votes	%	±%
PML (N)	Doctor Muhammad Iqbal	7,852	36.14	
ITP	Muhammad Shafi Khan	4,555	20.96	
PPP	Aftab Haider	4,207	19.36	
MWM	Allama Nayyar Abbas Mustfavi	3,612	16.62	
JUI-F	Saeed Ur Rehman	839	3.86	
PTI	Sher Ghazi	619	2.85	
MQM	Capt(Rtd.) Hadi Hussain	44	0.2	
Majority		3297		
Turnout		21,728	63.71	
PML(N) gain from PPP		Swing		

=== 2020 ===
Syed Sohail Abbas Shah, a candidate of Pakistan Tehreek-e-Insaf (PTI), received 6807 votes and won his seat in the 3rd Gilgit Baltistan Assembly.

Party	Candidate	Votes
Pakistan Tehreek-e-Insaf	Syed Sohail Abbas Shah	6807
Independent	Muhammad Iqbal	4855
Pakistan Muslim League (Q)	Muhammad Shafi	4754
Pakistan Peoples Party	Aftab Haider	3799
Pakistan Muslim League (N)	Zulfiqar Ali Tatu	2726
Independent	Sanan Ahmad	1821
Independent	Sher Ghazi	1136
Independent	Muhammad Nafees	256
Pak Sarzameen Party	Maulana Akbar Hussain	180

=== 2026 ===
General elections were held on 7 June 2026. Syed Sohail Abbas Shah, an independent candidate supported by PTI, won the election with 8,060 votes.

Election 2026: GBA-3 Giglit-III
Party	Candidate	Votes	%	±%
PTI	Syed Sohail Abbas Shah	8,060	26.97	
PPP	Aftab Haider	7,665	25.65	
PML(N)	Muhammad Iqbal	7,356	24.62	
IPP	Muhammad Shafi	6,007	20.10	
Others	Others (eighteen candidates)	783	2.62	
Valid ballots		29,881	97.88	
Rejected ballots		648	2.12	
Turnout		30,529	58.13	
Majority		395	1.32	
Registered electors		52,522		
PTI hold				
