= Yar Muhammad =

Pakistani jurist

- یار محمد

Chief Minister of Gilgit-Baltistan
- Caretaker
- In office 26 November 2025 – 5 July 2026
- Governor: Syed Mehdi Shah
- Preceded by: Gulbar Khan
- Succeeded by: Amjad Hussain Azar

Personal details
- Party: PML(N) (2026–present)

Yar Muhammad is a Pakistani jurist who served as the Caretaker Chief Minister of Gilgit-Baltistan from 26 November 2025 to 5 July 2026. He was appointed to this interim role following the dissolution of the Gilgit-Baltistan Assembly in November 2025. He previously served as a Justice of the Gilgit-Baltistan Chief Court.

Yar Muhammad hails from Astore. He obtained his Bachelor of Laws from Karachi and has practiced law in Gilgit-Baltistan for over 15 years. He was appointed Caretaker Chief Minister by Prime Minister Shehbaz Sharif and President Asif Ali Zardari to oversee the 2026 Gilgit-Baltistan elections.
