= Sher Jehan Mir =

Pakistani politician

- شیر جہاں میر

1st Caretaker Chief Minister of Gilgit-Baltistan
- In office 12 December 2014 – 26 June 2015
- Governor: Karam Ali Shah; Barjees Tahir
- Preceded by: Syed Mehdi Shah
- Succeeded by: Hafiz Hafeezur Rehman

Personal details
- Born: Sher Jehan Mir; 1954 (age 71–72) Gilgit, Gilgit-Baltistan, Pakistan
- Occupation: Retired banker

Sher Jehan Mir (Urdu: شیر جہاں میر) is a Pakistani politician and banker. He formerly served as the first caretaker Chief Minister of Gilgit-Baltistan from 12 December 2014 to 26 June 2015. He had also been nominated for the office of Governor of Gilgit-Baltistan in December 2007.

Currently, he is the chairman of the Gilgit-Baltistan Rural Support Program, which is an initiative for poverty alleviation. As a banker, he has also represented Pakistan at multiple forums, including the Bankers Conference in Japan in 1986.
