= Supreme Appellate Court Gilgit-Baltistan =

Highest court of appeal, Gilgit Baltistan, Pakistan

- Established: 2009
- Jurisdiction: Gilgit Baltistan
- Location: Principal seat:Gilgit; District registry:Skardu
- Authorised by: Gilgit-Baltistan (Empowerment and Self Governance Order) 2009
- Appeals from: Gilgit-Baltistan Chief Court
- Website: sacgb.gov.pk

Chief Justice
- Currently: Sardar Muhammad Shamim Khan
- Since: 05 November, 2022

The Supreme Appellate Court Gilgit-Baltistan is the highest court of appeal in the region of Gilgit Baltistan, Pakistan. It consists of a chief justice and two other judges. The court was established in 2009 under Gilgit-Baltistan (Empowerment and Self Governance Order) 2009 and has a status similar to the Supreme Court of Azad Jammu and Kashmir. The Permanent Seat of the Court is at Gilgit, but the court also sits from time to time at Skardu Branch Registry.

The appointment of the chairmen and members of the court on 27 September 2005 marked the beginning of the court's operations. Due to changes made to the Northern Areas Governance Order of 1994, the court's nomenclature was changed on 15 December to Northern Areas Supreme Appellate Court. Original and appellate jurisdiction were also granted, and the court was given status equal to the Supreme Court of Azad Jammu and Kashmir. Gilgit-Baltistan Empowerment and Self Governance Order 2009, which was published on 9 September, also gave the Supreme Appellate Court the same jurisdiction as the Supreme Court of Pakistan.

== Court composition ==
Under Gilgit-Baltistan Empowerment and Self-Governance Order 2009 Gilgit-Baltistan Supreme Appellate Court was established with a chief justice and two other judges. The chief judge and judges are appointed for a period of three years by the prime minister of Pakistan. There is a fixed number of justices at three and, as of current, there are currently two judges and one chief justice in Supreme Appellate Court Gilgit-Baltistan.

=== Chief Justice of GB and justices ===
Justices of the Supreme Appellate Court of Gilgit-Baltistan

Designation	Name	Appointment	Retirement	Court of precedence	Notes
Chief Justice	Sardar Muhammad Shamim Khan	5 November 2022			
Judge	Wazir Shakeel Ahmed	February 1, 2020	June 30, 2023	District Courts Skardu	
Chief Justice	Arshad Hussain Shah	May 08, 2019	2022		
Judge	Javed Iqbal	2018	2019		
Chief Justice	Rana Muhammad Shamim	2015	2018		
Judge	Shahbaz Khan	March 15, 2016	September 20, 2016		Deceased

=== Former Judges ===
==== Former Chief Justice ====
- Justice Qazi Ehsanullah Qureshi (2005-2008)
- Justice Muhammad Nawaz Abbasi (2009-2012)
- Justice Rana Muhammad Arshad (2012-2015)
- Justice Rana Muhammad Shamim (2015-2018)

==== Former Judges ====
- Justice Altaf Hussain (2005-2008)
- Justice Syed Tahir Ali Shah (2005-2008)
- Justice Syed Jaffar Shah (2009-2012)
- Justice Muhammad Yaqoob Khan (2009-2012)
- Justice Raja Jalal-ud-Din (2013-2016)
- Justice Muzaffar Ali (2013-2016)

== Jurisdiction ==
According to Articles 75, 76, 80, & 92 of the Government of Gilgit-Baltistan Order, 2018, the Supreme Appellate Court has the authority to decide cases in its original, appellate, review, and advisory jurisdictions.

=== Original jurisdiction ===
Without limiting the provisions of section 86, the Supreme Appellate Court shall have the authority to issue a declaratory order of the kind described in said section if it determines that a matter involving the enforcement of any fundamental right granted by Chapter I of Part II of this Order is one of general public importance. A Bench made up of at least two judges, to be appointed by the Chief Judge, shall hear an application made pursuant to subsection (1).

=== Review jurisdiction ===
Subject to the terms of an Act of the Assembly and any rules made by the Supreme Appellate Court, the Supreme Appellate Court shall have the authority to review any decision made or order issued by it.

=== Advisory jurisdiction ===
The Supreme Appellate Court of Gilgit-Baltistan may be consulted on any legal issue that the Prime Minister or Governor deems to be of public importance at any time. The prime minister or governor may submit the issue for consideration to the court. The prime minister or, as the case may be, the governor will receive a report from the Gilgit-Baltistan Supreme Appellate Court on any question that has been so referred.

== See also ==
- Gilgit-Baltistan Chief Court
- Supreme Court of Pakistan
- Gilgit-Baltistan Legislative Assembly
- Gilgit-Baltistan Council
