= Raja Nasir Ali Khan Maqpoon =

Pakistani politician from Gilgit-Baltistan

- راجا ناصر علی خان مقپون

Member of the Gilgit Baltistan Assembly
- Incumbent
- Assumed office 22 June 2026
- Constituency: GBA-10 Skardu-IV
- In office 25 November 2020 – 24 November 2025
- Constituency: GBA-10 Skardu-IV

Minister for Tourism, Culture, Youth Affairs, and Sports, Gilgit-Baltistan
- In office 2 December 2020 – 4 July 2023
- Chief Minister: Khalid Khurshid

Personal details
- Party: PPP (2025-present)
- Other political affiliations: PTI (2020-2025)

Raja Nasir Ali Khan Maqpoon is a Pakistani politician who has been a member of the Gilgit Baltistan Assembly since June 2026, and also held this role from November 2020 to November 2025. He was also the Minister of Tourism, Culture, Youth Affairs, and Sports from December 2020 to July 2023.

== Political career ==
Maqpoon contested the 2020 Gilgit-Baltistan Assembly election on 15 November 2020 from GBA-10 (Skardu-IV) as an Independent candidate. He won the election by the margin of 1,323 votes over the runner up Wazir Hassan of Pakistan Tehreek-e-Insaf (PTI). He garnered 4,667 votes while Hassan received 3,344 votes. After winning the election, Maqpoon joined PTI.

He was sworn into the cabinet of Chief Minister Khalid Khurshid as the Minister for Tourism, Culture, Youth Affairs, and Sports on 2 December 2022. He remianed in this role till the fall of Khurshid's government on 4 July 2023.

His party membership was terminated on 8 September 2025.

He joined the Pakistan People's Party (PPP) on 5 December 2025.

He was re-elected to the Gilgit-Baltistan Assembly from GBA-10 Skardu-IV as a candidate of PPP in the 2026 Gilgit Baltistan Assembly election. He received 6,773 votes and defeated Muhammad Khan Wazir, a candidate of Istehkam-e-Pakistan Party (IPP).

On 27 July 2026, he was sworn into the cabinet of Chief Minister Amjad Hussain Azar as the Minister for Forests, Wildlife, Parks, and Environment and the Minister for Agriculture, Fisheries, and Animal Husbandry.
