= GBA-8 Skardu-II =

Constituency for the Gilgit Baltistan Assembly

- Constituency for the Gilgit Baltistan Assembly
- District: Skardu District
- Electorate: 34,222

Current constituency
- Created: 2009
- Party: Majlis Wahdat-e-Muslimeen
- Member: Muhammad Kazim Maisam

GBA-8 Skardu-II is a constituency of Gilgit Baltistan Assembly which is currently represented by Muhammad Maisam Kazim of MWM.

== Members ==
Election	Member	Party	Votes received
2009	Sheikh Nisar	Pakistan Peoples Party	8,077 votes
2015	Imtiaz Haider Khan	Majlis Wahdat-e-Muslimeen	10,411 votes
2020	Muhammad Kazim Maisam	Majlis Wahdat-e-Muslimeen	7,998 votes
2026	Muhammad Kazim Maisam	Majlis Wahdat-e-Muslimeen	10,816 votes

== Election results ==
=== 2009 ===
Sheikh Nisar of PPP became member of assembly by getting 8,077 votes.

2009: Skardu-II
Party	Candidate	Votes	%
PPPP	Sheikh Nisar	8,077	44.61
Independent	Syed Muhammad Ali Shah	5,036	27.45
Independent	Ghulam Nabi	4,608	25.12
MQM	Nisar Khan	205	1.18
Turnout		18,344	47.57
PPP win (new seat)			

=== 2015 ===
Kacho Imtiaz Haider Khan of MWM won this seat by getting 10,411 votes.

2015: Skardu-II
Party	Candidate	Votes	%
MWM	Kacho Imtiaz Haider Khan	10,411	42.58
PML-N	Syed Mohammad Ali Shah	4,841	19.83
ITP	Syed Mohammad Abbas Rizvi	2,945	12.04
PPPP	Nisar Hussain Sarbaz	2,485	10.16
PTI	Muhammad Zakir	445	1.82
Independent	Farman Ali	381	1.56
Turnout		24,453	71.45
MWM gain from PPP		Swing	

=== 2020 ===
General elections were held on 15 November 2020. Muhammad Kazim Maisam, a candidate of Majlis Wahdat-e-Muslimeen (MWM), won the election with 7,988 votes.

=== 2026 ===
General elections were held on 7 June 2026. Muhammad Kazim Maisam, a candidate of MWM, won re-election with 10,816 votes.

Election 2026: GBA-8 Skardu-II
Party	Candidate	Votes	%	±%
MWM	Muhammad Kazim Maisam	10,816	37.19	
PPP	Syed Muhammad Ali Shah	10,251	35.25	
PML(N)	Imtiaz Haider Khan	4,581	15.75	
ITP	Nisar Hussain	2,110	7.26	
Independent	Mumtaz Ali Haideri	1,067	3.67	
Others	Others (nine candidates)	256	0.88	
Valid ballots		29,081	97.58	
Rejected ballots		722	2.42	
Turnout		29,803	56.21	
Majority		565	1.94	
Registered electors		53,022		
MWM hold				
