= Jutial =

- Town
- Jutial
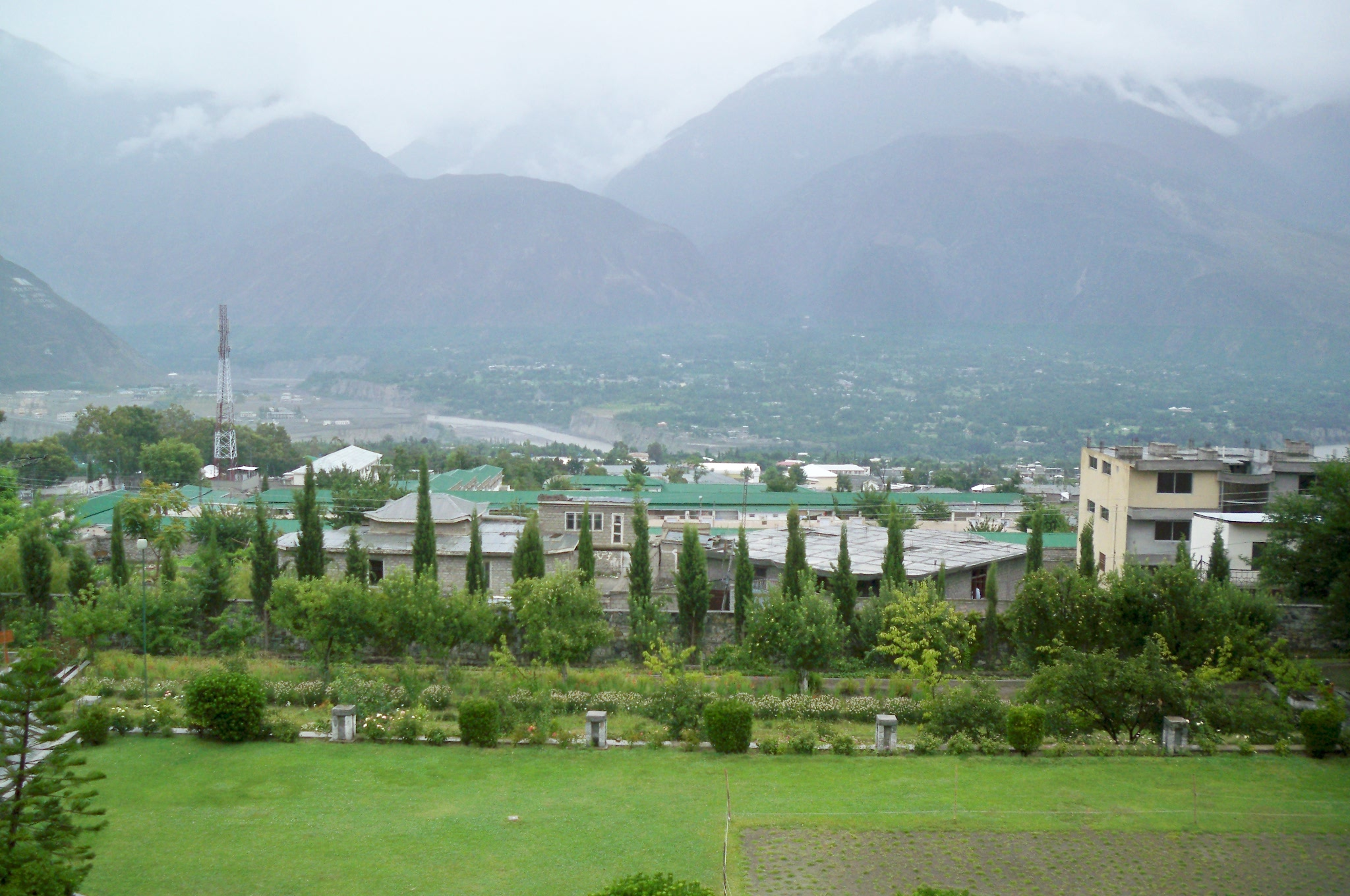
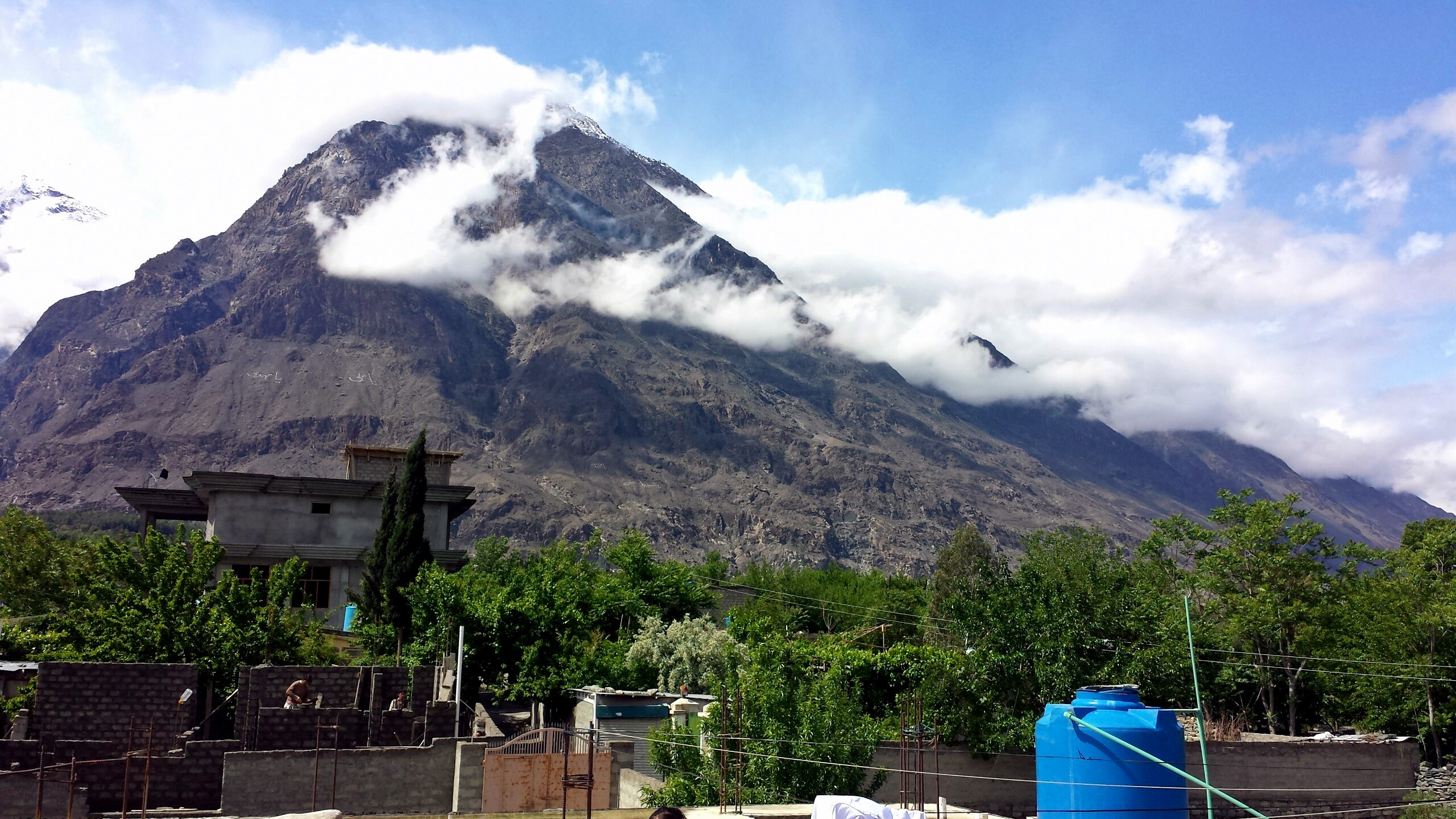
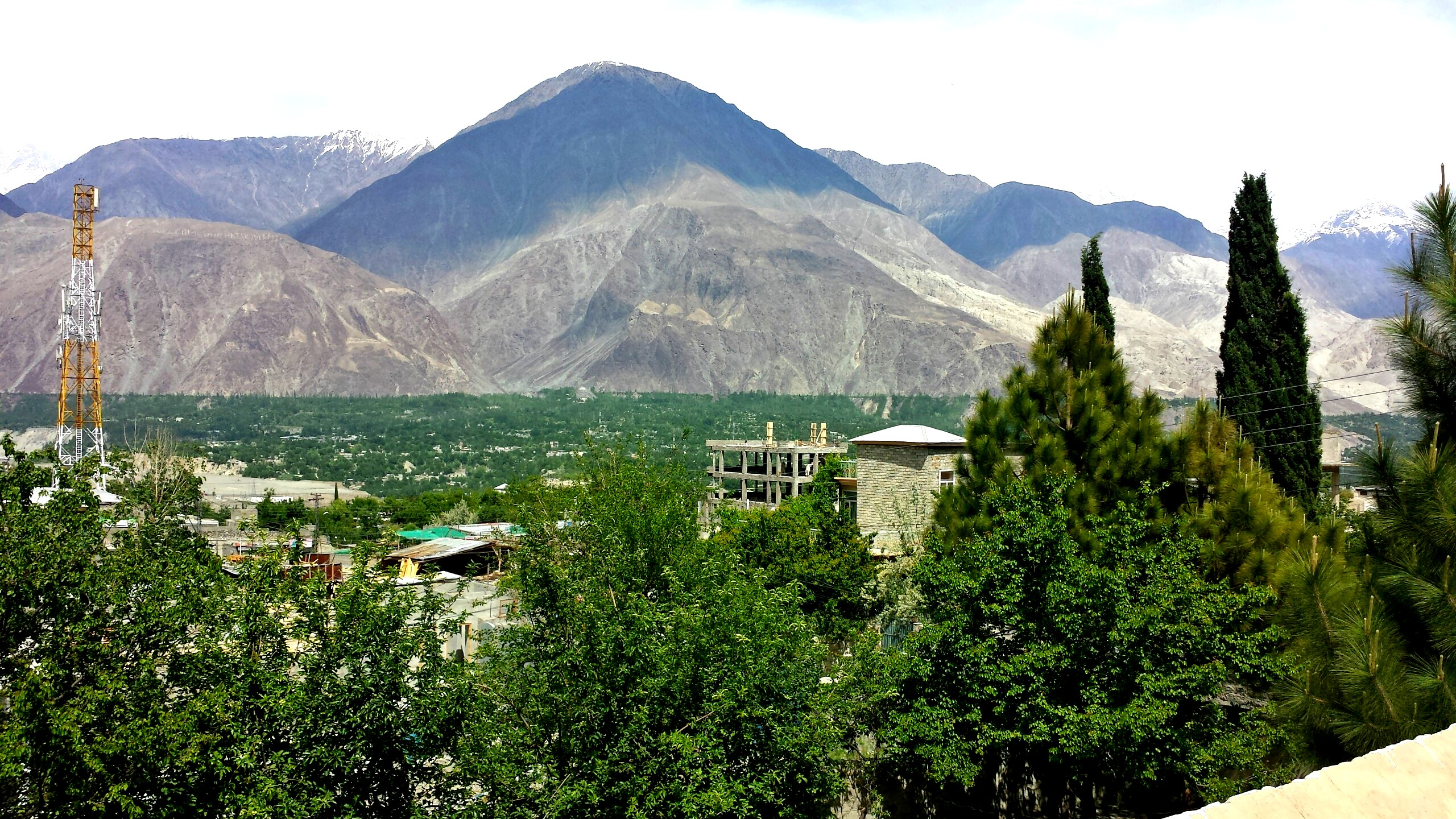
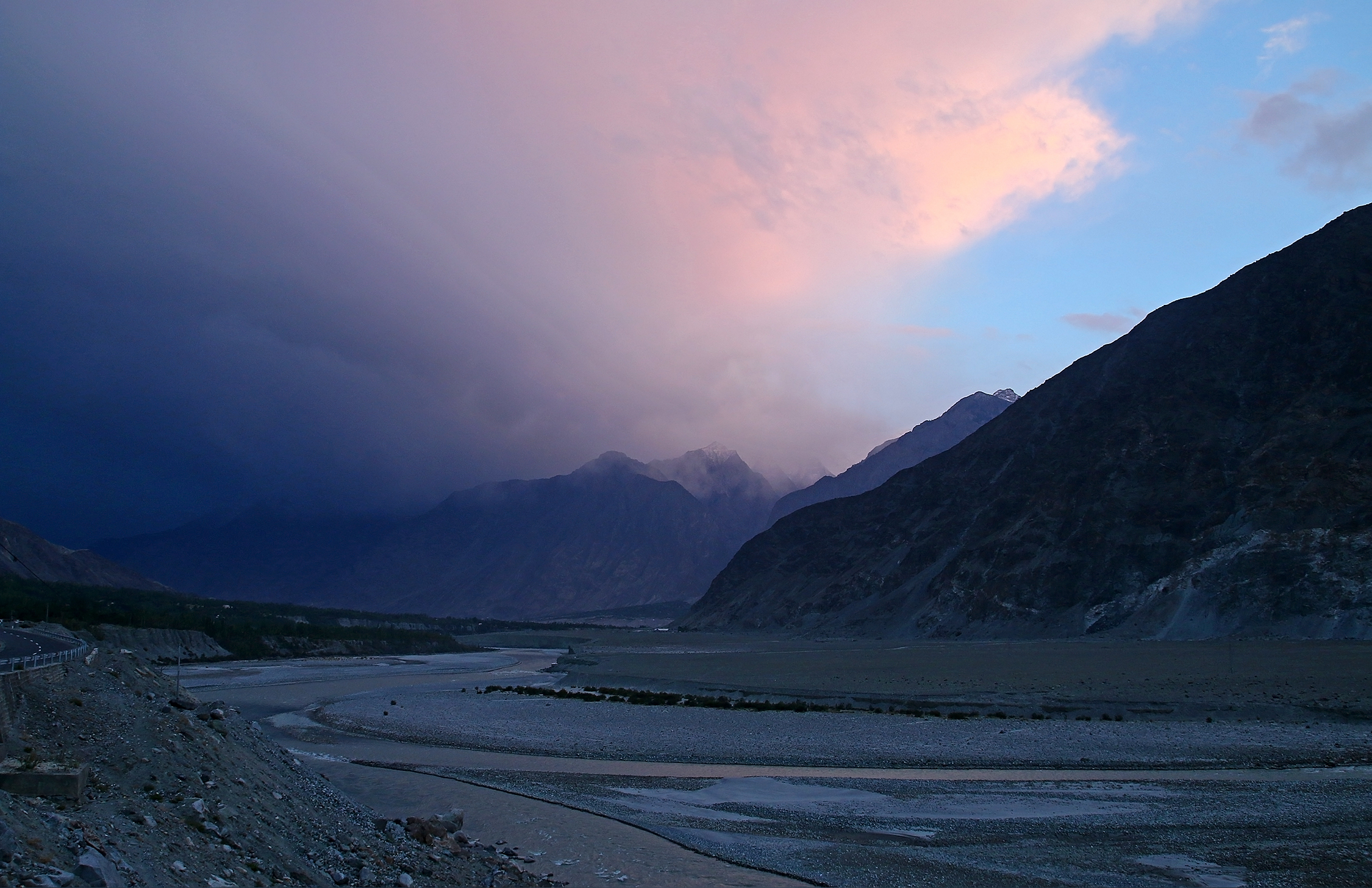
- Interactive map of Jutial
- Location within Gilgit Baltistan Location within Pakistan
- Coordinates: 35°54′30″N 74°21′30″E
- Country: Pakistan
- Region: (Gilgit-Baltistan) Gilgit Baltistan
- District: Gilgit District
- Time zone: UTC+5:00 (PST)
- Official Language: Urdu
- Native language: Shina
- Languages: 90.1% Shina; 9.9% (others)

Jutial is a developed residential scheme project in the city of Gilgit of Gilgit-Baltistan province in Pakistan, a new city neighborhood with a large population.

It is divided into sectors and sub-sectors. It contains the Gilgit-Baltistan Legislative Assembly, Gilgit-Baltistan Secretariat, FCNA (Force Commander Northern Areas). Also the Serena Hotel is located in Jutial.
