= Governor of Gilgit-Baltistan =

Appointed head of the province of Gilgit-Baltistan, Pakistan

- گورنر گلگت بلتستان
- Incumbent; Syed Mehdi Shah since 15 August 2022
- Government of Gilgit-Baltistan
- Style: The Honorable (formal)
- Reports to: President of Pakistan
- Residence: Governor's House
- Seat: Gilgit
- Nominator: Prime Minister of Pakistan
- Appointer: President of Pakistan
- Term length: 5 years
- Constituting instrument: Gilgit Baltistan Governance order 2009
- Formation: 16 September 2009; 17 years ago
- First holder: Qamar Zaman Kaira (acting)
- Website: gilgitbaltistan.gov.pk

The governor of Gilgit-Baltistan is the appointed head of state of the provincial government in Gilgit-Baltistan, Pakistan. The governor is appointed by the prime minister of Pakistan and is generally considered to hold a largely ceremonial role. However, throughout Pakistan’s history, the powers of provincial governors have expanded significantly whenever provincial assemblies were dissolved and administrative authority shifted directly to the governors.

The current governor is Syed Mehdi Shah, who assumed office on 15 August 2022.

== Powers of Governor ==
The governor exercises a range of executive, legislative, judicial, and emergency powers within Gilgit-Baltistan. Executive powers include making appointments, ordering removals, issuing official directives, and administering oaths. Legislative powers relate to matters involving the Gilgit-Baltistan Legislative Assembly. Judicial powers concern the functioning and oversight of the Supreme Appellate Court and the Chief Court of Gilgit-Baltistan. In addition, the governor holds emergency powers that may be invoked during a state of emergency in the region.

== Executive Powers ==
The governor is the ceremonial and appointed head of state of Gilgit-Baltistan. All executive powers are exercised on his behalf by the government, consisting of the chief minister and the cabinet. He is constitutionally bound to act on the advice of the chief minister or the cabinet. There shall be a cabinet of ministers, headed by the chief minister, to aid and advise the governor in the exercise of his functions. The chief minister is required to keep the governor informed about matters of administration and all legislative proposals intended for presentation before the Assembly.

The governor serves as the vice chairman of the Gilgit-Baltistan Council. He appoints ministers on the advice of the chief minister and appoints the caretaker cabinet on the advice of the caretaker chief minister. He may direct the chief minister to seek a vote of confidence from the Assembly; if the chief minister fails to obtain it, the governor may remove him and appoint a chief minister who commands the majority support of the Assembly.

The governor appoints the advocate general on the advice of the chief minister and appoints the auditor general on the advice of the prime minister. He also advises the prime minister on the appointment of the Chief Election Commissioner of Gilgit-Baltistan and the chairman of the Gilgit-Baltistan Public Service Commission. In addition, he may issue rules necessary for carrying out the purposes of the Order.

The governor announces the date of the general election for the Legislative Assembly, to be held no later than ninety days after its dissolution. He administers oaths to the chief minister, the cabinet, the caretaker chief minister, and the caretaker cabinet.

== Legislative Powers ==
The governor assents to bills passed by the Legislative Assembly. A bill may also become an act if it is deemed to have received assent after the passage of a prescribed period of time. The governor summons and prorogues sessions of the Legislative Assembly and dissolves the Assembly on the advice of the chief minister.

The governor may also dissolve the Assembly at his discretion, subject to the prior approval of the president, when a vote of no confidence has been passed against the chief minister and no other member of the Assembly is able to command the confidence of the majority, as determined in a session convened specifically for that purpose in accordance the Gilgit-Baltistan Empowerment and Self-Governance Order.

All proceedings of the Assembly are conducted according to rules of procedure framed by the Assembly and approved by the governor. The speaker may resign from office by submitting a written resignation addressed to the governor.

The governor may promulgate ordinances when the Assembly is not in session, acting on the advice of the chief minister or the cabinet. The annual budget, once passed by the Assembly, is presented to the governor for authentication through his signature.

== Judicial Powers ==
The chief judge of the Supreme Appellate Court is appointed by the prime minister on the advice of the governor, while the other judges are appointed by the chairman on the advice of the governor after obtaining the views of the chief judge. Similarly, the chief judge of the Chief Court is appointed by the prime minister on the advice of the governor, and the other judges are appointed by the chairman on the governor’s advice after seeking the chief judge’s views.

The governor also appoints the acting chief judge of the Supreme Appellate Court and the acting chief judge of the Chief Court. On the advice of the prime minister, he may remove any judge in accordance with the recommendations of the Supreme Judicial Council.

If at any time the governor wishes to obtain the opinion of the Gilgit-Baltistan Supreme Appellate Court on a question of law that he considers to be of public importance, he may refer the matter to the Court for its opinion. The governor also administers the oath of office to the chief judge of the Supreme Appellate Court and the chief judge of the Chief Court.

== Emergency Powers ==
The prime minister of Pakistan may issue a proclamation of emergency upon receiving a report from the governor indicating that, due to war, external aggression, or other circumstances, the government cannot be carried on in accordance with the provisions of the Gilgit-Baltistan Order. With the approval of the prime minister, the governor may directly exercise the executive authority of the government during the period of emergency.

The proclamation of emergency must be laid before the Legislative Assembly, which shall be summoned by the prime minister on the advice of the governor to meet within thirty days of its issuance.

The prime minister may also impose a financial emergency if the economic life, financial stability, or credit of Gilgit-Baltistan, or any part of it, is threatened, after consultation with the governor.

== List of governors ==
The following is the list of governors who have served since Gilgit-Baltistan was granted provincial status on 29 August 2009, when the federal cabinet approved the Gilgit-Baltistan (Empowerment and Self-Governance) Order 2009.

N	Name	Entered office	Left office	Party
1	Qamar Zaman Kaira (acting)	16 September 2009	22 March 2010	Pakistan People's Party
2	Shama Khalid	23 March 2010	16 September 2010	Pakistan People's Party
3	Wazir Baig (acting)	17 September 2010	26 January 2011	Pakistan People's Party
4	Pir Karam Ali Shah	27 January 2011	15 February 2015	Pakistan People's Party
5	Chaudhry Muhammad Barjees Tahir (acting)	16 February 2015	24 November 2015	Pakistan Muslim League (N)
6	Mir Ghazanfar Ali Khan	24 November 2015	14 September 2018	Pakistan Muslim League (N)
7	Raja Jalal Hussain Maqpoon	30 September 2018	11 April 2022	Pakistan Tehreek-e-Insaf
8	Syed Mehdi Shah	15 August 2022	Incumbent	Pakistan People's Party

== See also ==
- Chief Minister (Gilgit-Baltistan)
- Government of Gilgit-Baltistan
- Gilgit-Baltistan Legislative Assembly
- List of current Pakistani governors
- List of current Pakistani chief ministers
