= GBA-10 Skardu-IV =

Constituency for the Gilgit Baltistan Assembly

- Constituency for the Gilgit Baltistan Assembly
- District: Skardu District
- Electorate: 21,806

Current constituency
- Created: 2009
- Party: Pakistan People's Party
- Member: Raja Nasir Ali Khan Maqpoon

GBA-10 Skardu-IV is a constituency of Gilgit Baltistan Assembly which is currently represented by Raja Nasir Ali Khan of Pakistan People's Party.

== Members ==
Election	Member	Party	Votes received
2009	Wazir Hussain	Pakistan Peoples Party	3,578 votes
2015	Capt. (r) Sikandar	Islami Tehreek Pakistan	5,039 votes
2020	Raja Nasir Ali Khan	Pakistan Tehreek-e-Insaf (Note: Maqpoon was elected as an independent, but later joined PTI.)	5,124 votes
2026	Raja Nasir Ali Khan	Pakistan Peoples Party	6,773 votes

== Election results ==
=== 2009 ===
Wazir Hussain of PPP became member of assembly by getting 3,578 votes.

=== 2015 ===
Captain Sikandar of Islami Tehreek Pakistan won this seat by getting 4,949 votes.

2015: Skardu-IV
Party	Candidate	Votes	%
ITP	Capt. (r) Sikander	4,949	32.44
MWM	Raja Nasir Ali Khan Maqpoon	4,933	32.34
PPP	Wazir Hassan	3,057	20.04
PML-N	Ghulam Abbas	1,522	9.98
Independent	Manzoor Hussain	383	2.51
Independent	Jalil Haider	148	0.97
MQM	Ali Hassan	134	0.88
PTI	Najaf Ali	118	0.77
APML	Syed Abbas Almosvi	10	0.07
Turnout		15254	69.95
Tehreek-Jaafria Pakistan gain from [[PPP|PPP]]		Swing	

=== 2020 ===
General elections were held on 15 November 2020. Raja Nasir Ali Khan Maqpoon, and independent candidate, won the election with 4,811 votes. He later joined Pakistan Tehreek-e-Insaf (PTI).

=== 2026 ===
General elections were held on 7 June 2026. Raja Nasir Ali Khan Maqpoon, a candidate of Pakistan People's Party (PPP), won the election with votes.

Election 2026: GBA-2 Giglit-II
Party	Candidate	Votes	%	±%
PPP	Raja Nasir Ali Khan Maqpoon	6,773	29.87	
IPP	Muhammad Khan Wazir	5,098	22.48	
PML(N)	Wazir Hassan	4,529	19.97	
MWM	Mushtaq Hussain	3,260	14.38	
ITP	Wazir Ijaz Hussain	1,149	5.07	
Independent	Muhammad Sharif	815	3.59	
Independent	Wajahat Ali	514	2.27	
Independent	Wazir Muhammad Kazim	320	1.41	
Others	Others (five candidates)	209	0.92	
Valid ballots		22,676	96.57	
Rejected ballots		806	3.43	
Turnout		23,482	67.23	
Majority		1,675	7.39	
Registered electors		34,927		
PPP gain from Independent				
