= Gilgit-Baltistan Chief Court =

High court of the Gilgit-Baltistan

- Established: 2009 (17 years ago)}
- Jurisdiction: Gilgit-Baltistan
- Location: Gilgit
- Authorised by: Gilgit-Baltistan (Empowerment and Self Governance Order) 2009
- Appeals to: Gilgit-Baltistan Supreme Appellate Court
- Appeals from: District Courts of Gilgit-Baltistan
- Judge term length: Until 62 years of age
- Website: www.gbcc.gov.pk

Chief Justice
- Currently: Mr. Justice Ali Baig
- Since: 30-11-2017

The Gilgit-Baltistan Chief Court is the court of appeals in the region of Gilgit-Baltistan, Pakistan. The decisions of the court are appealed to Supreme Appellate Court Gilgit-Baltistan. The court acts under 2009 Gilgit-Baltistan Empowerment and Self-Governance Order and has the equal status as of other high courts of Pakistan. The Permanent Seat of the Court is at Gilgit, but the Court also sits from time to time at Skardu Branch Registry.

== History ==
Prior to 1972, Gilgit Baltistan was known as Northern Areas and ruled under the infamous FCR, which was abolished in 1972. The Ministry of Kashmir Affairs and Gilgit-Baltistan introduced some judicial and administrative reforms and courts were established. These were given more power over time as per the order of the Supreme Court of Pakistan under the Al-Jehad Trust versus the Federation of Pakistan case. In 2009, under Gilgit-Baltistan (Empowerment and Self Governance Order) 2009 the court in its current form was established.

== Judges ==
The Court is composed of one Chief Judge and four other judges appointed by Gilgit-Baltistan Council.

=== Current Composition ===
- Chief Justice Justice Malik Nawaz Haq (2020 - to date)
- Justice Ali Baig (2017 - to date)

== Former Judges ==
=== Former Chief Judges ===
- Justice Sahib Khan
- Justice Muhammad Alam
- Justice Wazir Shakeel Ahmed (Elevated to Supreme Appellate Court Gilgit-Baltistan)

=== Former Judges ===
- Justice Muhammad Umer

== See also ==
- Gilgit-Baltistan Judicial Academy
- Government of Gilgit-Baltistan
- Gilgit-Baltistan District Courts
