= Amjad Hussain Azar =

Pakistani politician from Gilgit-Baltistan

- امجد حسین آزر

Chief Minister of Gilgit-Baltistan
- Incumbent
- Assumed office 6 July 2026
- Governor: Syed Mehdi Shah
- Preceded by: Yar Muhammad (caretaker)

Leader of the Opposition of the Gilgit-Baltistan Assembly
- In office 30 November 2020 – 13 July 2023
- Preceded by: Muhammad Shafi
- Succeeded by: Muhammad Kazim Maisam

President of PPP, Gilgit-Baltistan
- Incumbent
- Assumed office 9 December 2015
- President: Asif Ali Zardari
- Chairman: Bilawal Bhutto Zardari
- Preceded by: Syed Mehdi Shah

Member of the Gilgit Baltistan Assembly
- Incumbent
- Assumed office 22 June 2026
- Constituency: GBA-1 Gilgit-I
- In office 25 November 2020 – 24 November 2025
- Preceded by: Jafarullah Khan
- Constituency: GBA-1 Gilgit-I

Member of the Gilgit-Baltistan Council
- In office 3 April 2010 – 25 April 2016
- Prime Minister: Yousaf Raza Gillani; Raja Pervaiz Ashraf; Nawaz Sharif

Personal details
- Born: 1975 (age 50–51)
- Party: PPP (2015-present)

Amjad Hussain Azar is a Pakistani politician who has been the Chief Minister of Gilgit-Baltistan since 6 July 2026. He had also been the Leader of the Opposition of the Gilgit-Baltistan Assembly since November 2020 to July 2023. He also served as a member of the first Gilgit-Baltistan Council from April 2010 to April 2015.

== Political career ==
On 18 March 2010, Azar was elected to the first Gilgit-Baltistan Council as a candidate of Pakistan People's Party (PPP). On 3 April 2010, he was sworn in by Prime Minister Yousaf Raza Gillani.

He contested the 2015 Gilgit-Baltistan Assembly election from GBA-1 Gilgit-I as a candidate of PPP, but was unsuccessful. He received 6,297 votes and was defeated by Jafarullah Khan, a candidate of Pakistan Muslim League (N) (PML(N)).

On 9 December 2015, former President Asif Ali Zardari, who was co-chairman of PPP, appointed Azar as the President of party's Gilgit-Baltistan chapter.

He contested the 2020 Gilgit-Baltistan Assembly election on 15 November 2020 from GBA-1 Gilgit-I and GBA-4 Nagar-I on the ticket of the PPP. He won GBA-1 Gilgit-I by the margin of 3,393 votes over the Independent runner up Sultan Raees. He garnered 10,875 votes while Raees received 7,482 votes. He won GBA-4 Nagar-I by the margin of 498 votes over the runner up Muhammad Ayub Waziri of Islami Tehreek Pakistan. He garnered 6,104 votes while Waziri received 5,606 votes. After the election, he chose to vacate GBA-4 (Nagar-I) and took oath as the member from GBA-1 (Gilgit-I).

On 30 November 2020, he unsuccessfully ran for the post of Chief Minister of Gilgit-Baltistan. He received nine votes and his opponent, Khalid Khurshid received twenty-two votes to be elected the Chief Minister. On the same day, he was appointed as the Leader of the Opposition in the Gilgit-Baltistan Assembly.

On 11 July 2023, he tendered his resignation as a member of the Gilgit-Baltistan Assembly to the Speaker of the Assembly, Nazir Ahmed. He resigned due to internal differences with the PPP's senior leadership which arose due to the Chief Minister election caused by Khurshid's disqualification. His resignation was later rejected by Ahmed, due to it being tendered in haste.

Azar was re-elected to the Gilgit-Baltistan Assembly from GBA-1 Gilgit-I as a candidate of PPP in the 2026 Gilgit Baltistan Assembly election. He received 11,287 votes and defeated Muhammad Shafiq Ud Din, a candidate of PML(N).

He took oath as a member on 22 June 2026, and was elected unopposed to the position of Chief Minister on the same day. On 6 July 2026, he was sworn in as the chief minister of Gilgit-Baltistan in a ceremony in Gilgit.
