= Khalid Khurshid =

Pakistani politician (born 1980)

Muhammad Khalid Khurshid Khan
- محمد خالد خورشید خان

3rd Chief Minister of Gilgit Baltistan
- In office 1 December 2020 – 4 July 2023
- President: Arif Alvi
- Prime Minister: Shehbaz Sharif; Imran Khan
- Governor: Raja Jalal Hussain Maqpoon; Syed Mehdi Shah
- Preceded by: Mir Afzal (caretaker)
- Succeeded by: Gulbar Khan

Member of the Gilgit Baltistan Assembly
- In office 25 November 2020 – 4 July 2023
- Preceded by: Rana Farman Ali
- Succeeded by: Rana Farman Ali
- Constituency: GBA-13 (Astore-I)

President of PTI Gilgit-Baltistan
- Incumbent
- Assumed office 30 May 2022
- Chairman: Imran Khan; Gohar Ali Khan

Personal details
- Born: 17 November 1980 (age 45) Rattu, Gilgit-Baltistan, Pakistan
- Party: PTI (2018-present)
- Other political affiliations: IND (2008-2015)
- Education: University of London
- Profession: Politician
- Website: khalidkhurshid.com

Muhammad Khalid Khurshid Khan (Urdu: محمد خالد خورشید خان; born 17 November 1980) is a politician who served as the President of PTI Gilgit-Baltistan from May 2022 to December 2023 and as the Chief Minister of Gilgit-Baltistan, a territory in Northern Pakistan (de facto province) until he was disqualified from his post on 4 July 2023 by the Gilgit-Baltistan Chief Court. He was also a member of the Gilgit Baltistan Assembly from 25 November 2020 until his disqualification.

== Early life and education ==
Khursid was born on 17 November 1980 in Rattu, Astore District of Northern Areas territory. He belongs to a Shina Muslim family belonging to the Machoque tribe. He matriculated from Public School and College, Gilgit and did his graduation from Lahore, Punjab. He received degree in law from University of London, England.

== Political career ==
His political career started in the 2009 elections when he lost his first election for Gilgit-Baltistan Legislative Assembly as an independent candidate from GBA-13 Astore-I. He received 2,667 votes, placing third, and lost to Abdul Hameed Khan, another independent candidate.

He ran as an independent candidate again from the same constituency in the 2015 Gilgit-Baltistan Assembly election, but was unsuccessful. He received 4,019 votes and was defeated by Rana Farman Ali, a candidate of the Pakistan Muslim League (N) (PML(N)).

He joined the Pakistan Tehreek-e-Insaf (PTI) on 28 July 2018. In 2019 appointed President of the PTI's Astore-Diamer Division.

Khurshid contested the 2020 Gilgit-Baltistan Assembly election on 15 November 2020 from GBA-13 (Astore-I) on the ticket of the PTI. He won the election by a margin of 1,719 votes. He garnered 5,297 votes, defeating Rana Farman Ali of the PML(N) received 4,033 votes. The PTI had nominated Khalid Khurshid Khan as its candidate for the Chief Minister of Gilgit-Baltistan on 27 November 2020. On 30 November 2020, he was elected as Chief Minister of Gigit-Baltistan.

Under the GB Investment Program, Khalid partnered with the private sector and academia to attract new investors to invest in Gilgit-Baltistan and succeeded in signing thirty two MOU with various investors at Dubai Expo.

On 4 July 2023, he was disqualified following a court case that revealed his law degree from London to be fake. The case against Khursheed was filed by Ghulam Shahzad Agha, a member of the Pakistan People's Party (PPP) who argued that his degree was fraudulent. The court verdict was delivered by a three-member bench is considered as a politically engineered judgement to oust PTI from government. Despite facing challenges from multiple fronts, including a case in the Election Commission of Gilgit-Baltistan and a no-confidence motion in the assembly, Khursheed's disqualification was ultimately determined by the court. As a result of his disqualification, the PTI government in Gilgit-Baltistan was dissolved.

On 21 December 2023, he was also disqualified from the party’s regional presidency.

On 31 December 2024, an anti-terrorism court in Gilgit-Baltistan sentenced him to 34 years in prison for threatening security institutions.

== Personal life ==
Khalid belongs to an influential political family of Gilgit Baltistan. His father Justice (retd.) Muhammad Khurshid Khan won his seat with a big margin in first ever elections from Astore 1, GBLA 13, held in Gilgit Baltistan in 1973. He later on joined the judiciary and retired as Chief Justice of the Chief Court of Gilgit-Baltistan in November 2004. His uncle, Haji Muhammad Inayat Khan, served as the chairman of District Council of Diamer for three consecutive terms from 1981 to 1994.

One of his brother, Atif Khurshid, was an International Civil Servant, worked for the United Nations Children's Fund as a social policy head and is currently working as the CEO of the Social Benefit and Income Support at the Ministry of Human Resource and Social Development, Kingdom of Saudi Arabia. Khalid's eldest brother, Dr. Arif Khurshid, is a surgeon in the Kingdom of Saudi Arabia. Khalid's younger brother, Hanif Ullah Khan, is a civil servant currently posted as Deputy Inspector General (DIG) of Police. Khalid's sister, Ayesha Khurshid is deputy chief in Gilgit Baltistan's Planning and Development Department.

Khalid is married into an influential Pirzada, Syed family of village Gudai, district Astore. Khalid's father in law Pirzada Muhammad Alam (late) was a well reputed civil servant. Khalid's wife, Mrs. Riffat Alam is a professor at Karakoram International University heading the Media Sciences Department.

Khalid is a disciple of acclaimed religious scholar Pir Mian Shafi Jhagvi of Neelum District in Azad Kashmir.

== Assassination attempt ==
Khurshid was going to participate in a by-election campaign with his colleagues when they were blocked and fired upon in Chowgam area of Astore District. He and his associates remained safe in the incident the Pakistan Tehreek-e-Insaf said that the Khalid Khurshid survived an assassination attempt when his vehicle was ambushed during an election campaign the party condemned the attack and demanded immediate arrest of those responsible, It claimed that Khalid Khurshid's security was unlawfully revoked by the Gilgit Baltistan government.

“Former Prime Minister Imran Khan has also survived multiple assassination attempts and had his security detail removed, despite court orders,” the party said. “Pakistan continues its unfortunate slide from tourism to terrorism; along with unprecedented economic meltdown and unbridled fascism,” it added. “If any harm comes to anyone in PTI, including Khalid Khurshid Khan, the government will be held responsible,” the party added.
