= Gulbar Khan =

Pakistani politician from Gilgit-Baltistan

- گلبر خان

Chief Minister of Gilgit-Baltistan
- In office 13 July 2023 – 24 November 2025
- Governor: Syed Mehdi Shah
- Preceded by: Khalid Khurshid
- Succeeded by: Yar Muhammad (caretaker)

Member of the Gilgit-Baltistan Assembly
- In office 25 November 2020 – 24 November 2025
- Preceded by: Imran Wakeel
- Succeeded by: Malik Kifayatur Rehman
- Constituency: GBA-18 Diamer-IV
- In office 10 December 2009 – 9 December 2014
- Succeeded by: Muhammad Wakeel
- Constituency: GBA-18 Diamer-IV

Personal details
- Party: IPP (2026-present)
- Other political affiliations: PTI (2020-2023); JUI (F) (2009-2020)

Gulbar Khan (Urdu: گلبر خان) is a Pakistani politician who had been a member of the Gilgit Baltistan Assembly from November 2020 to November 2025. He served as the Chief Minister of Gilgit-Baltistan from July 2023 to November 2025.

== Political career ==
Khan was elected to the Gilgit-Baltistan Assembly from GBA-18 Diamer-IV as a candidate of Jamiat Ulema-e-Islam (F) (JUI(F)) in the 2009 Gilgit-Baltistan Assembly election. He received 2,741 votes and defeated Malik Muhammad Miskeen, an independent candidate.

He contested the 2015 Gilgit-Baltistan Assembly election from GBA-18 Diamer-IV as a candidate of JUI(F), but was unsuccessful. He received 2,438 votes and was defeated by Muhammad Wakeel, a candidate of PML(N).

He contested a 2016 by-election from GBA-18 Diamer-IV as a candidate of JUI(F), but was unsuccessful. He received 2,334 votes and was defeated by Imran Wakeel, a candidate of PML(N).

He contested the 2020 Gilgit-Baltistan Assembly election on 15 November 2020 from GBA-18 (Diamer-IV) on the ticket of Pakistan Tehreek-e-Insaf. He won the election by the margin of 807 votes over the runner-up Independent Malik Kifayatur Rehman. He garnered 6,793 votes while Rehman received 5,986 votes.

On 13 July 2023, he was elected as Chief Minister after securing 19 votes, including three each from the Pakistan Muslim League (N) PML(N) and Pakistan People's Party (PPP), and one from the Jamiat Ulema-e-Islam (F) (JUI(F)). The remaining twelve votes were from PTI members, who subsequently formed a forward bloc in the assembly. His cabinet included two members each from the PML(N) and PPP, one from the JUI(F), and nine from the PTI forward bloc.

His party membership was terminated on 8 September 2025.

He joined the Istehkam-e-Pakistan Party (IPP) on 11 February 2026.

He contested the 2026 Gilgit Baltistan Assembly election from GBA-18 Diamer-IV as a candidate of IPP, but was unsuccessful. He received 5,447 votes and was defeated by Malik Kifayatur Rehman, a candidate of PML(N).
