= Syed Mehdi Shah =

Chief Minister of Gilgit Baltistan

- سید مہدی شاہ

8th Governor of Gilgit-Baltistan
- Incumbent
- Assumed office 15 August 2022
- Nominated by: Prime Minister of Pakistan
- President: Arif Alvi; Asif Ali Zardari
- Prime Minister: Shehbaz Sharif; Anwaar ul Haq Kakar; Shehbaz Sharif
- Chief Minister: Khalid Khurshid; Gulbar Khan; Yar Muhammad (caretaker); Amjad Hussain Azar
- Preceded by: Raja Jalal Hussain Maqpoon

1st Chief Minister of Gilgit-Baltistan
- In office 11 December 2009 – 11 December 2014
- President: Asif Ali Zardari
- Prime Minister: Yusuf Raza Gillani
- Governor: Qamar Zaman Kaira; Shama Khalid; Wazir Baig; Karam Ali Shah
- Preceded by: Position established
- Succeeded by: Sher Jehan Mir (caretaker)

Personal details
- Born: Skardu, Gilgit-Baltistan, Pakistan
- Party: PPP (1971-Present)
- Children: Syed Tauqeer Mehdi (son)
- Occupation: Politician

Syed Mehdi Shah (Urdu: سید مہدی شاہ) is a Pakistani politician who is currently serving as the 8th Governor of Gilgit-Baltistan since 15 August 2022. Previously, he served as the first Chief Minister of Gilgit-Baltistan from 2009 to 2014. He has also served as the President of the Pakistan People's Party at Gilgit-Baltistan.

Mehdi Shah hails from Skardu. He contested in the 2020 Gilgit-Baltistan Assembly election from the constituency GBA-7 (Skardu-I), but lost to Raja Zakaria Khan Maqpoon.
