= Gilgit-Baltistan Assembly =

Unicameral legislature of Gilgit-Baltistan

Gilgit-Baltistan Assembly گلگت بلتستان اسمبلی
- 4th Gilgit-Baltistan Assembly

Type
- Type: Unicameral

Leadership
- Speaker: Imran Nadeem, PPP since 22 June 2026
- Deputy Speaker: Malik Kifayatur Rehman, PML(N) since 22 June 2026
- Chief Minister: Amjad Hussain Azar, PPP since 22 June 2026
- Leader of the Opposition: Hafiz Hafeezur Rehman, PML(N) since 22 June 2026

Structure
- Seats: 33
- Political groups: Government (22): PPP (16); IPP (6); Opposition (11): PML(N) (9); MWM (1); IND (Note: The sole independent in the Assembly, Syed Sohail Abbas Shah, was elected as an independent supported by Pakistan Tehreek-e-Insaf (PTI). PTI could not nominate candidates to the 2026 elections because the Election Commission Gilgit-Baltistan prohibited the PTI election symbol.) (1)

Elections
- Voting system: Mixed member majoritarian: 24 members elected by FPTP; 6 seats for women and 3 seats for Technocrats and Professionals through PR
- Last election: 7 June 2026
- Next election: No later than 6 August 2031

Meeting place
- Gilgit-Baltistan Assembly Building, Jutial

Website
- Assembly website

Constitution
- Gilgit-Baltistan Empowerment and Self-Governance Order

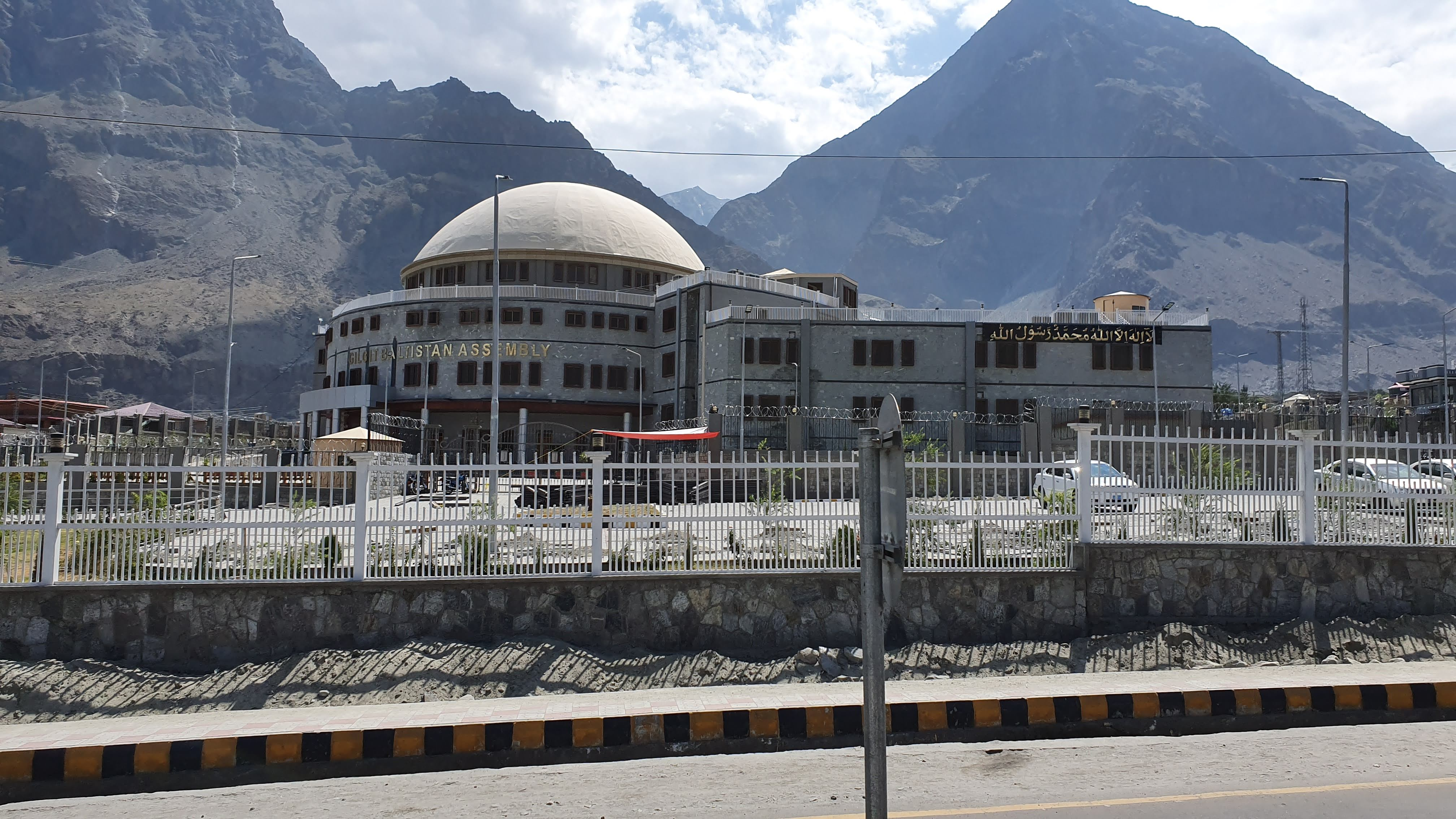
Gilgit Baltistan Assembly building, Gilgit

The Gilgit-Baltistan Assembly (GBA), formerly known as Gilgit-Baltistan Legislative Assembly (GBLA), is a unicameral legislature of elected representatives of the Pakistani territory (de facto province) of Gilgit-Baltistan which is located in Jutial neighbourhood in the city of Gilgit, the capital of Gilgit-Baltistan.

It was established under the Gilgit-Baltistan Empowerment and Self-Governance Order in 2009 which granted the region self-rule and an elected legislature, having a total of 33 seats, with 24 general seats, 6 seats reserved for women and 3 reserved for Technocrats and Professionals.

The third Gilgit-Baltistan Elections was held on 15 November 2020.

== History ==
The Gilgit-Baltistan Legislative Assembly was formed as a part of the Gilgit-Baltistan Empowerment and Self-Governance Order in 2009 which granted the region self-rule and an elected legislative assembly. The first Gilgit-Baltistan Assembly elections were held on 12 November 2009 which Pakistan Peoples Party won by 20 seats.

== List of Assemblies ==
| Order | Terms |
|---|---|
| First Assembly | November 2009 to April 2015 |
| Second Assembly | June 2015 to June 2020 |
| Third Assembly | November 2020 to November 2025 |
| Fourth Assembly | June 2026 to present |

== Speakers of Gilgit-Baltistan Assembly ==
| No. | Names | Successive term of each |
|---|---|---|
| 1 | Mir Wazir Baig | 11 December 2009 to 23 June 2015 |
| 2 | Haji Fida Muhammad Nashad | 24 June 2015 to 25 November 2020 |
| 3 | Amjad Zaidi | 26 November 2020 to 7 June 2023 |
| 4 | Nazir Ahmed | 7 June 2023 to 22 June 2026 |
| 5 | Imran Nadeem | 22 June 2026 to present |

== Chief Ministers of Gilgit-Baltistan ==
| Sr no. | Name of Chief Minister | Entered office | Left office | Political Party/Notes |
|---|---|---|---|---|
| 1 | Syed Mehdi Shah | 11 December 2009 | 11 December 2014 | PPP |
| . | Sher Jehan Mir | 12 December 2014 | 26 June 2015 | Caretaker |
| 2 | Hafiz Hafeezur Rehman | 26 June 2015 | 23 June 2020 | PMLN |
| . | Mir Afzal | 24 June 2020 | 30 November 2020 | Caretaker |
| 3 | Muhammad Khalid Khurshid Khan | 30 November 2020 | 4 July 2023 | PTI |
| 4 | Gulbar Khan | 13 July 2023 | 24 November 2025 | PTI |
| . | Yar Muhammad | 26 November 2025 | 6 July 2026 | Caretaker |
| 5 | Amjad Hussain Azar | 6 July 2026 | Incumbent | PPP |

== List of Opposition Leaders ==
| Sr no. | Name of Opposition Leader | Entered office | Left office | Political Party/Notes |
|---|---|---|---|---|
| 1 | Bashir Ahmad | 11 December 2009 | 11 December 2014 | PML(Q) |
| 2 | Shah Baig | 2 July 2015 | 14 November 2017 | JUI(F) |
| 3 | Capt.(R) Muhammad Shafi | 14 November 2017 | 23 June 2020 | ITP |
| 4 | Amjad Hussain Azar | 30 November 2020 | 13 July 2023 | PPP |
| 5 | Muhammad Kazim Maisam | 19 July 2023 | 24 November 2025 | MWM |
| 6 | Hafiz Hafeezur Rehman | 22 June 2026 | | PML(N) |

== Elections ==
=== 2009 Elections ===
In the 2009 elections, Pakistan Peoples Party had won 20 seats, Jamiat Ulema-e-Islam (Fazl) with 4 and Pakistan Muslim League (Q) with 3 seats.

| Party | Elected | Reserved | Total |
|---|---|---|---|
| Pakistan Peoples Party | 14 | 6 | 20 |
| Jamiat Ulema-e-Islam (F) | 2 | 2 | 4 |
| Pakistan Muslim League (Q) | 2 | 1 | 3 |
| Pakistan Muslim League (N) | 2 | 0 | 2 |
| Balawaristan National Front | 1 | 0 | 1 |
| Muttahida Qaumi Movement | 1 | 0 | 1 |
| Others | 2 | 0 | 2 |
| Total | 24 | 9 | 33 |

=== 2015 Elections ===
In the 2015 elections, Pakistan Muslim League (N) won 22 seats, Islami Tehreek Pakistan with 4 and Majlis Wahdat-e-Muslimeen with 3 seats.

| Party | Elected | Reserved | Total |
|---|---|---|---|
| Pakistan Muslim League (N) | 16 | 6 | 21 |
| Islami Tehreek Pakistan | 2 | 2 | 4 |
| Majlis Wahdat-e-Muslimeen | 2 | 1 | 3 |
| Pakistan Peoples Party | 1 | 0 | 1 |
| Pakistan Tehreek-e-Insaf | 1 | 0 | 1 |
| Balawaristan National Front | 1 | 0 | 1 |
| Jamiat Ulema-e-Islam (F) | 1 | 0 | 1 |
| Total | 24 | 9 | 33 |

=== 2020 Elections ===
| Party | Elected | Reserved | Total |
|---|---|---|---|
| Pakistan Tehreek-e-Insaf | 16 | 6 | 22 |
| Pakistan Peoples Party | 3 | 2 | 5 |
| Pakistan Muslim League (N) | 2 | 1 | 3 |
| Majlis Wahdat-e-Muslimeen | 1 | 0 | 1 |
| Jamiat Ulema-e-Islam (F) | 1 | 0 | 1 |
| Independent | 1 | 0 | 1 |
| Total | 24 | 9 | 33 |

=== 2026 Elections ===
| Party | Elected | Reserved | Total |
|---|---|---|---|
| Pakistan Peoples Party | 11 | 4 | 15 |
| Pakistan Muslim League (N) | 6 | 3 | 9 |
| Istehkam-e-Pakistan Party | 5 | 2 | 7 |
| Pakistan Tehreek-e-Insaf | 1 | 0 | 1 |
| Majlis Wahdat-e-Muslimeen | 1 | 0 | 1 |
| Total | 24 | 9 | 33 |

== See also ==
- Gilgit-Baltistan Council
- Government of Gilgit-Baltistan
