= Chief Minister of Gilgit-Baltistan =

Head of government of administrative territory of Gilgit Baltistan

Chief Minister of Gilgit Baltistan (GB)
- Incumbent; Amjad Hussain Azar since 6 July 2026
- Government of Gilgit-Baltistan
- Style: His Excellency
- Member of: Gilgit-Baltistan Assembly; Cabinet of Gilgit Baltistan
- Reports to: Governor of Gilgit-Baltistan; Gilgit-Baltistan Assembly
- Residence: Chief Minister House Gilgit
- Seat: Gilgit
- Appointer: Gilgit Baltistan Assembly
- Term length: 5 years
- Constituting instrument: Gilgit-Baltistan Empowerment and Self-Govenance Order 2009
- Formation: 2009
- First holder: Syed Mehdi Shah
- Website: www.cmgb.gov.pk

The chief minister of Gilgit Baltistan is elected by the Gilgit Baltistan Assembly to serve as the head of the provincial government in Gilgit-Baltistan for a five-year term.

== List of chief ministers ==
No.	Name of Chief Minister	Entered office	Left office	Political party	Ref.
1	Syed Mehdi Shah	11 December 2009	11 December 2014	PPP	
2	Sher Jehan Mir	12 December 2014	26 June 2015	Caretaker	
3	Hafiz Hafeezur Rehman	26 June 2015	23 June 2020	PML-N	
4	Mir Afzal	24 June 2020	30 November 2020	Caretaker	
5	Khalid Khurshid	1 December 2020	4 July 2023	PTI	
6	Gulbar Khan	13 July 2023	24 November 2025	PTI forward block	
7	Yar Muhammad	26 November 2025	5 July 2026	Caretaker	
8	Amjad Hussain Azar	6 July 2026		PPP	

== See also ==
- Government of Gilgit-Baltistan
- Cabinet of Gilgit-Baltistan
- Gilgit-Baltistan Assembly
- Governor of Gilgit-Baltistan
- List of current Pakistani chief ministers
- List of current Pakistani governors
