= List of members of the 2nd Assembly of Gilgit-Baltistan =

The 2nd Assembly of Gilgit Baltistan was elected on 8 June 2015 by polls held across the province of Gilgit Baltistan. This assembly completed its full five year term on 23 June 2020 and dissolved on the same date.

Members of the assembly took oath on 24 June 2015.

== Party position ==
Party	Members
Pakistan Muslim League N	21
Islami Tehreek Pakistan	4
Majlis Wahdat-e-Muslimeen	3
Pakistan People's Party	1
Pakistan Tehreek-e-Insaf	1
Balawaristan National Front	1
Jamiat Ulema-e-Islam F	1
Independent politician	1
Total	33

== List of Members of the 2nd Assembly of Gilgit Baltistan ==
Members of the 2nd Assembly of Gilgit Baltistan are as follows:

Sr no.	Constituency	Name of Member	Party	Notes
1	GBLA-1	Jafarullah Khan	PML N	Deputy Speaker
2	GBLA-2	Hafiz Hafeezur Rehman	PML N	Chief Minister
3	GBLA-3	Dr Muhammad Iqbal	PML N	
4	GBLA-4	Dr Muhammad Ali Haider	ITP	Died in Feb 2017
4	GBLA-4	Javed Hussian	PPP	Elected in July 2017
5	GBLA-5	Dr Rizwan Ali	MWM	
6	GBLA-6	Mir Ghazanfar Ali Khan	PML N	Resigned in 2016
6	GBLA-6	Shah Salim Khan	PML N	Elected in 2016 Disqualified in 2018
6	GBLA-6	Vacant		
7	GBLA-7	Akbar Khan Taban	PML N	Finance Minister
8	GBLA-8	Kacho Imtiaz Haider Khan	MWM	
9	GBLA-9	Fida Muhammad Nashad	PML N	Speaker
10	GBLA-10	Capt. (r) Sikander	ITP	
11	GBLA-11	Iqbal Hassan	PML N	
12	GBLA-12	Imran Nadeem	PPP	
13	GBLA-13	Farman Ali	PML N	
14	GBLA-14	Barkat Jamil	PML N	
15	GBLA-15	Shah Baig	JUI F	
16	GBLA-16	Janbaz Khan	PML N	
17	GBLA-17	Haidar Khan	PML N	
18	GBLA-18	Muhammad Wakeel	PML N	Died in 2016
18	GBLA-18	Imran Wakeel	PML N	Elected in 2016
19	GBLA-19	Nawaz Khan Naji	BNF	
20	GBLA-20	Fida Khan	IND	
21	GBLA-21	Raja Jahanzaib	PTI	
22	GBLA-22	Muhammad Ibrahim Sanai	PML N	Minister for education
23	GBLA-23	Ghulam Hussain	PML N	
24	GBLA-24	Mohammad Shafiq	PML N	
25	Reserved for Women	Shereen Akhtar	PML N	
26	Reserved for Women	Nasreen Bano	PML N	
27	Reserved for Women	Rani Atiqa Ghazanfar	PML N	
28	Reserved for Women	Sobia Jabeen Muqadam	PML N	
29	Reserved for Women	Rehana Abbadi	ITP	
30	Reserved for Women	Bibi Saleema	MWM	
31	Reserved for Technocrats	Aurungzaib Khan Advocate	PML N	
32	Reserved for Technocrats	Major (R) Muhammad Amin	PML N	
33	Reserved for Technocrats	Caption (R) Muhammad Shafi	ITP	Opposition Leader
