= Rana Farman Ali =

Pakistani politician from Gilgit-Baltistan

- رانا فرمان علی

Member of the Gilgit-Baltistan Assembly
- Incumbent
- Assumed office 22 June 2026
- Preceded by: Khalid Khurshid
- Constituency: GBA-13 Astore-I
- In office 24 June 2015 – 23 June 2020
- Succeeded by: Khalid Khurshid
- Constituency: GBA-13 Astore-I

Minister for Excise and Taxation, Gilgit-Baltistan
- In office 7 July 2015 – 23 July 2020
- Chief Minister: Hafiz Hafeezur Rehman

Personal details
- Party: Pakistan Muslim League (N)

Rana Farman Ali is a Pakistani politician who has served as a member of the Gilgit-Baltistan Assembly since June 2026, and previously served in this role from June 2015 to June 2020. He also served as the Minister for Excise and Taxation from 7 July 2015 to 23 June 2020.

== Political career ==
Ali contested the 2009 Gilgit-Baltistan Assembly election from GBA-13 Astore-I as a candidate of Pakistan Muslim League (N) (PML(N)), but was unsuccessful. He received 3,546 votes and was defeated by Abdul Hameed Khan, an independent candidate.

He was elected to the Gilgit-Baltistan Assembly from GBA-13 Astore-I as a candidate of PML(N) in the 2015 Gilgit-Baltistan Assembly election. He received 5,942 votes and defeated Khalid Khurshid, an independent candidate.

He was sworn into the cabinet of Chief Minister Hafiz Hafeezur Rehman as the Minister for Excise and Taxation.

He contested the 2020 Gilgit-Baltistan Assembly election from GBA-13 Astore-I as a candidate of PML(N), but was unsuccessful. He received 3,528 votes and was defeated by Khalid Khurshid, a candidate of Pakistan Tehreek-e-Insaf (PTI).

He contested a 2023 by-election from GBA-13 Astore-I as a candidate of PML(N), but was unusccessful. He received votes and was defeated by Muhammad Khurshid Khan, a candidate of PTI. The result of this by-election was later annulled by the Election Commission Gilgit-Baltistan, which remarked that the PTI and PML(N) candidates had violated the Election Act.

He was re-elected to the Gilgit-Baltistan Assembly from GBA-13 Atore-I as a candidate of PML(N)in the 2026 Gilgit Baltistan Assembly election. He received 8,058 votes and defeated Shahida Khurshid, an independent candidate supported by PTI.
