= Zulfiqar Ali Murad =

Pakistani politician from Gilgit-Baltistan

- ذولفقار علی مراد

Member of the Gilgit-Baltistan Assembly
- Incumbent
- Assumed office 22 June 2026
- Preceded by: Javed Ali Manwa
- Constituency: GBA-5 Nagar-II

Personal details
- Party: Pakistan People's Party

Zulfiqar Ali Murad is a Pakistani politician who has served as a member of the Gilgit-Baltistan Assembly since June 2026, and previously served in this role from December 2009 to December 2014. He represents the Pakistan People's Party (PPP).

== Political career ==
Murad contested the 2009 Gilgit-Baltistan Assembly election from GBA-5 Gilgit-V as a candidate of the PPP but was unsuccessful, receiving 1,739 votes and losing to Mirza Hussain of the Pakistan Muslim League (Q) (PML(Q)).

He contested the 2015 Gilgit-Baltistan Assembly election from GBA-5 Hunza-Nagar-II as a candidate of the PPP but was again unsuccessful, placing fourth with 1,337 votes; the seat was won by Rizwan Ali of Majlis Wahdat-e-Muslimeen (MWM).

He contested the 2020 Gilgit-Baltistan Assembly election from GBA-5 Nagar-II as an independent candidate but was unsuccessful, receiving 2,149 votes and losing to Javed Ali Manwa, also an independent.

He was elected to the Gilgit-Baltistan Assembly from GBA-5 Nagar-II as a candidate of PPP in the 2026 Gilgit Baltistan Assembly election. He received 2,780 votes and defeated Riaz Akbar, a candidate of MWM.

On 27 July 2026, he was sworn into the cabinet of Chief Minister Amjad Hussain Azar as the Minister for Local Government and Rural Development.
