= Attaullah Shah =

Pakistani politician from Gilgit-Baltistan

- عطاء اللہ شاہ

Member of the Gilgit-Baltistan Assembly
- Incumbent
- Assumed office 22 September 2026
- Preceded by: Imam Malik (Note: Malik was notified as the returned candidate in the 2026 elections, but was later de-notified due to a challenging petition by Shah. After the postal ballots were counted, Shah was notified as the winner. The member of the Assembly before the elections was Muhammad Anwar)
- Constituency: GBA-16 Diamer-II

Personal details
- Party: Pakistan People's Party (2026-present)
- Other political affiliations: Independent (2015–2026)

Attaullah Shah is a Pakistani politician who has served as a member of the Gilgit-Baltistan Assembly since September 2026.

== Political career ==
Shah contested the 2015 Gilgit-Baltistan Assembly election as an independent candidate from GBA-16 Diamer-II. He received 3,068 votes and was defeated by Janbaz Khan, a candidate of Pakistan Muslim League (N) (PML(N)).

He contested the 2020 Gilgit-Baltistan Assembly election as an independent candidate from GBA-16 Diamer-II. He received 4,314 votes and was defeated by Muhammad Anwar, a candidate of PML(N).

He was elected to the Gilgit-Baltistan Assembly from GBA-16 Diamer-II as a candidate of Pakistan People's Party (PPP) in the 2026 Gilgit Baltistan Assembly election. On 19 June 2026, Imam Malik, an independent candidate, was declared the winner by the returning officer, receiving 6,320 votes to Shah's 6,296. However, after a successful petition by Shah, an election tribunal, on 11 September, ordered the returning officer of the constituency to verify and count postal ballots. After doing so, Shah was declared the winner, having received 6,618 votes and defeating Malik by a slim margin of 13 votes. On 22 September, he was sworn in as a member of the Assembly.
