= Muhammad Naseem (Pakistani politician) =

Pakistani politician from Gilgit-Baltistan

- محمد نسیم

Member of the Gilgit-Baltistan Assembly
- Incumbent
- Assumed office 13 July 2026
- Preceded by: Rehmat Khaliq
- Constituency: GBA-17 Diamer-III

Personal details
- Party: Pakistan People's Party

Muhammad Naseem is a Pakistani politician who has been a member of the Gilgit-Baltistan Assembly since July 2026.

== Political career ==
Naseem contested the 2015 Gilgit-Baltistan Assembly election from GBA-17 Diamer-III as an independent candidate, but was unsuccessful. He received 43 votes and was defeated by Haider Khan, a candidate of Pakistan Muslim League (N) (PML(N)).

He was elected to the Gilgit-Baltistan Assembly from GBA-17 Diamer-III as a candidate of Pakistan People's Party (PPP) in the 2026 Gilgit Baltistan Assembly election. On election day, which was 9 June 2026, he initially received 8,954 votes and defeated Rehmat Khaliq, a candidate of Jamiat Ulema-e-Islam (F). On 19 June, the Supreme Appellate Court Gilgit-Baltistan (SACGB) accepted a petition by Khaliq, and suspended the election results. On 6 July, after concluding the case, the SACGB ordered re-polling to be held at eight polling stations. On 12 July, re-polling was held, and Naseem won with 10,716 votes. He was sworn in on 13 July 2026.

On 27 July 2026, he was sworn into the cabinet of Chief Minister Amjad Hussain Azar as the Minister for Communication and Works.
