= Sadia Danish =

Pakistani politician

- سعدیہ دانش

Deputy Speaker of the Gilgit-Baltistan Assembly
- In office 17 July 2023 – 24 November 2025
- Speaker: Nazir Ahmed
- Preceded by: Nazir Ahmed
- Succeeded by: Malik Kifayatur Rehman

Member of the Gilgit-Baltistan Assembly
- Incumbent
- Assumed office 22 June 2026
- Constituency: Reserved seat for women
- In office 25 November 2020 – 24 November 2025
- Constituency: Reserved seat for women
- In office 10 December 2009 – 9 December 2014
- Constituency: Reserved seat for women

Minister for Information, Gilgit-Baltistan
- In office 9 November 2013 – 9 December 2014
- Chief Minister: Syed Mehdi Shah

Advisor for Tourism, Sports, and Youth Affairs, Gilgit-Baltistan
- In office 2010 – 9 December 2014
- Chief Minister: Syed Mehdi Shah

Personal details
- Party: PPP (2009-present)

Sadia Danish (Urdu: سعدیہ دانش) is a Pakistani politician, who has been a member of the Gilgit-Baltistan Assembly since June 2026, and also served in this position from November 2020 to November 2025 and from December 2009 to December 2014. In 2023, she was unanimously elected as Deputy Speaker of the Gilgit-Baltistan Assembly, becoming the first woman elected to the post. She also served as Minister of Information and Tourism from 2009 to 2014.

== Biography ==
Sadia Danish is a native of Gilgit. She joined the Pakistan People's Party (PPP), later serving as the party's secretary of information and as a provincial president of their women's wing. In the 2009 Gilgit-Baltistan Assembly election, she was the head of the campaign of the women's wing.

She was elected for the PPP as a reserved women's seat member of the first Gilgit-Baltistan Assembly in the 2009 election, remaining there until 2014. During her first term as MLA, she served as Advisor for Torusim, Youth Affairs and Sports from 2010 to 2014, and as Minister for Information from November 2013 to 2014. She was a member of National Commission on the Status of Women, having been the Gilgit Baltistan member in 2013.

She was re-elected to the Gilgit-Baltistan Assembly on a reserved seat for women in the 2020 Gilgit-Baltistan Assembly election. In the same election, she contested a general seat from GBA-18 Diamer-IV as a candidate of PPP, but was unsuccessful. She received 185 votes and was defeated by Gulbar Khan, a candidate of Pakistan Tehreek-e-Insaf (PTI).

On 17 July 2023, speaker Nazir Ahmed announced that Danish was unanimously elected as the Assembly's deputy speaker, as the sole nominee for the post on behalf of the ruling coalition; there was no nomination from any of the other MLAs, including the opposition. She is the first woman elected to the post, with The Nation calling it a "landmark development". After becoming deputy speaker, she announced her intention to focus on women empowerment in the province. She ceased to be Deputy Speaker when the Assembly was dissolved on 24 November 2025.

She was re-elected to the Gilgit-Baltistan Assembly in the 2026 Gilgit Baltistan Assembly election as a candidate of PPP on a reserved seat for women.
