= Aman Ali (Pakistani politician) =

Pakistani politician from Gilgit-Baltistan

- امان علی

Member of the Gilgit-Baltistan Assembly
- Incumbent
- Assumed office 22 June 2026
- Preceded by: Ghulam Muhammad
- Constituency: GBA-21 Ghizer-III

Personal details
- Party: Istehkam-e-Pakistan Party (2026-present)
- Other political affiliations: Independent politician (2015-2026)

Aman Ali is a Pakistani politician who has served as a member of the Gilgit-Baltistan Assembly since June 2026.

== Political career ==
Ali contested the 2015 Gilgit-Baltistan Assembly election from GBA-21 Ghizer-III as an independent candidate, but was unsuccessful. He received 7 votes, tied for second-last, and was defeated by Raja Jahanzaib, a candidate of Pakistan Tehreek-e-Insaf (PTI).

He was elected to the Gilgit-Baltistan Assembly from GBA-21 Ghizer-III as an independent candidate in the 2026 Gilgit Baltistan Assembly election. He received 9,978 votes and defeated Muhammad Ayub Shah, a candidate of Pakistan People's Party (PPP). He later joined Istehkam-e-Pakistan Party (IPP).
