= Jafarullah Khan =

Pakistani politician

- جعفر الله خان

Deputy Speaker of the Gilgit-Baltistan Legislative Assembly
- In office 25 June 2015 – 23 June 2020
- Speaker: Fida Muhammad Nashad
- Preceded by: Jamil Ahmad
- Succeeded by: Nazir Ahmed

Member of the Gilgit-Baltistan Legislative Assembly
- In office 24 June 2015 – 23 June 2020
- Preceded by: Raziuddin Rizvi
- Succeeded by: Amjad Hussain Azar
- Constituency: GBA-1 Gilgit-I
- Majority: 874 (4.43%)

Personal details
- Party: Pakistan Muslim League (N)
- Education: University of Agriculture, Faisalabad; Jama Millia College, Karachi

Jafarullah Khan is a Pakistani politician and a member of Pakistan Muslim League-N (PML-N). He served as a Member of the Gilgit-Baltistan Legislative Assembly and as its Deputy Speaker from June 2015 to June 2020.

== Education ==
Jafarullah Khan attended Jama Millia College in Karachi and subsequently studied at the University of Agriculture, Faisalabad.

== Political career ==
He contested the 2009 Gilgit-Baltistan Assembly election from GBA-1 Gilgit-I a candidate of Pakistan Muslim League (N) (PML(N)), but was unsuccessful. He received 8,858 votes and was defeated by Syed Raziuddin Rizvi, an independent candidate.

He was elected to the Gilgit-Baltistan Assembly from GBA-1 Gilgit-I as a candidate of PML(N) in the 2015 Gilgit-Baltistan Assembly election. He received 7,171 votes and defeated Amjad Hussain Azar, a candidate of Pakistan People's Party (PPP).

Following the election, Khan was elected Deputy Speaker of the Gilgit-Baltistan Assembly unopposed on 25 June 2015, alongside Speaker Fida Muhammad Nashad, also of PML(N). The Majlis Wahdat-e-Muslimeen candidate withdrew in his favour. He served in both roles until the expiry of the assembly's term in June 2020.

He contested the 2020 Gilgit-Baltistan Assembly election from GBA-1 Gilgit-I as a candidate of PML(N), but was unsuccessful. He was defeated by Amjad Hussain Azar, a candidate of PPP.
