= Muhammad Ibrahim Sanai =

Pakistani politician from Gilgit-Baltistan

- محمد ابراہیم ثنائی

Member of the Gilgit-Baltistan Assembly
- Incumbent
- Assumed office 22 June 2026
- Preceded by: Mushtaq Hussain
- Constituency: GBA-22 Ghanche-I
- In office 24 June 2015 – 23 June 2020
- Preceded by: Muhammad Jaffar
- Succeeded by: Mushtaq Hussain
- Constituency: GBA-22 Ghanche-I

Minister for Education and Information, Gilgit-Baltistan
- In office 7 July 2015 – 23 June 2020
- Chief Minister: Hafiz Hafeezur Rehman

Personal details
- Party: Pakistan Muslim League (N) (2009–2020; 2026–present)
- Other political affiliations: Pakistan Tehreek-e-Insaf (2020–2026)

Muhammad Ibrahim Sanai is a Pakistani politician who has served as a member of the Gilgit-Baltistan Assembly since June 2026, and previously served in this role from June 2015 to June 2020. He also served as the Minister for Education and Information from July 2015 to June 2020.

== Political career ==
Sanai was elected to the Northern Areas Legislative Council for NA-22 Ghanche-I in the 2004 elections as a candidate of Pakistan Muslim League (Q) (PML(Q)).

He served as the NALC's Advisor on Public Works from 2004 to 2009.

He contested the 2009 Gilgit-Baltistan Assembly election from GBA-22 Ghanche-I as a candidate of Pakistan Muslim League (N) (PML(N)), but was unsuccessful. He received 5,876 votes and was defeated by Muhammad Jaffar, a candidate of Pakistan People's Party (PPP).

He was elected to the Gilgit-Baltistan Assembly from GBA-22 Ghanche-I as a candidate of PML(N) in the 2015 Gilgit-Baltistan Assembly election. He received 11,382 votes and defeated Amina Bibi Ansari, a candidate of Pakistan Tehreek-e-Insaf (PTI).

He was sworn into the cabinet of Chief Minister Hafiz Hafeezur Rehman as the Minister for Education and Information.

He contested the 2020 Gilgit-Baltistan Assembly election from GBA-22 Ghanche-I as a candidate of PTI, but was unsuccessful. He received 4,945 votes and was defeated by Mushtaq Hussain, an independent candidate.

He was re-elected to the Gilgit-Baltistan Assembly from GBA-22 Ghanche-I as a candidate of PML(N) in the 2026 Gilgit Baltistan Assembly election. He received 10,136 votes and defeated Ashiq Hussain, a candidate of PPP.
