= Rana Muhammad Farooq =

Pakistani politician from Gilgit-Baltistan

- رانا محمد فاروق

Member of the Gilgit-Baltistan Assembly
- Incumbent
- Assumed office 22 June 2026
- Preceded by: Shamsul Haq Lone
- Constituency: GBA-14 Astore-II

Personal details
- Party: Pakistan Muslim League (N)

Rana Muhammad Farooq is a Pakistani politician who has served as a member of the Gilgit-Baltistan Assembly since June 2026.

== Political career ==
He contested the 2020 Gilgit-Baltistan Assembly election from GBA-14 Astore-II as a candidate of Pakistan Muslim League (N) (PML(N)), but was unsuccessful. He received 3,554 votes and was defeated by Shamsul Haq Lone, a candidate of Pakistan Tehreek-e-Insaf (PTI).

He was re-elected to the Gilgit-Baltistan Assembly from GBA-14 Astore-III as a candidate of PML(N) in the 2026 Gilgit Baltistan Assembly election. He received 7,058 votes and defeated Syed Muhammad Abbas, a candidate of Pakistan People's Party (PPP).
