= Ghulam Muhammad (Gilgit-Baltistan politician) =

Pakistani politician from Gilgit-Baltistan

- غلام محمد

Member of the Gilgit Baltistan Assembly
- In office 25 November 2020 – 24 November 2025
- Preceded by: Raja Jahanzaib
- Succeeded by: Aman Ali
- Constituency: GBA-21 (Ghizer-III)

Provincial Minister of Food and Tourism
- In office 18 July 2023 – 24 November 2025
- Chief Minister: Gulbar Khan
- Preceded by: Muhammad Kazim Maisam

Personal details
- Party: Pakistan Muslim League (N) (2015-present)
- Other political affiliations: Pakistan People's Party (2009-2015)

Ghulam Muhammad is a Pakistani politician who had been a member of the Gilgit Baltistan Assembly from November 2020 to November 2025.

== Political career ==
Muhammad contested the 2009 Gilgit-Baltistan Assembly election from GBA-21 Ghizer-III as a candidate of Pakistan People's Party (PPP), but was unsuccessful. He received 4,905 votes and was defeated by Muhammad Ayub Shah, an independent candidate.

He contested the 2015 Gilgit-Baltistan Assembly election from GBA-21 Ghizer-III as a candidate of Pakistan Muslim League (N) (PML(N)), but was unsuccessful. He received 5,602 votes and was defeated by Raja Jahanzaib, a candidate of Pakistan Tehreek-e-Insaf (PTI).

He contested the 2020 Gilgit-Baltistan Assembly election on 15 November 2020 from GBA-21 Ghizer-III on the ticket from PML(N). He won the election by the margin of 904 votes over the runner up Muhammad Ayub Shah of PPP. He garnered 4,334 votes while Shah received 3,430 votes.

He contested the 2026 Gilgit Baltistan Assembly election from GBA-21 Ghizer-III as a candidate of PML(N), but was unsuccessful. He received 5,626 votes and was defeated by Aman Ali, an independent candidate.
