= Ayub Waziri =

Pakistani politician from Gilgit-Baltistan

- محمد ایوب وزیری

Member of the Gilgit-Baltistan Assembly
- In office 23 September 2021 – 24 November 2025
- Preceded by: Amjad Hussain
- Succeeded by: Muhammad Ali Akhtar
- Constituency: GBA-4 Nagar-I

Personal details
- Party: Islami Tehreek Pakistan

Muhammad Ayub Waziri is a Pakistani politician who served as a member of the Gilgit-Baltistan Assembly from September 2021 to November 2025.

== Political career ==
Waziri contested the 2020 Gilgit-Baltistan Assembly election from GBA-4 Nagar-I as a candidate of Islami Tehreek Pakistan (ITP), but was unsuccessful. He received 4,291 votes and was defeated by Amjad Hussain, a candidate of the Pakistan People's Party (PPP), who received 4,716 votes.

Hussain also contested and won GBA-1 Gilgit-I in the same election and opted to retain that seat, vacating GBA-4 Nagar-I and triggering a by-election. Waziri was elected to the seat as the ITP candidate in that 2021 by-election, receiving 5,341 votes and defeating Agha Zulfiqar Ali of the Pakistan Tehreek-e-Insaf (PTI). He was sworn in as a member of the Assembly on 23 September 2021.

Waziri contested the 2026 Gilgit Baltistan Assembly election from GBA-4 Nagar-I as the ITP candidate, receiving 6,597 votes. He was defeated by Muhammad Ali Akhtar of the PPP, who received 7,654 votes.
