= Muhammad Ayub Shah =

Pakistani politician

- محمد ایوب شاہ

Member of the Gilgit-Baltistan Council
- Incumbent
- Assumed office 12 November 2021

Member of the Gilgit-Baltistan Assembly
- In office 10 December 2009 – 9 December 2014
- Succeeded by: Raja Jahanzaib
- Constituency: GBA-21 (Ghizer-III)

Personal details
- Party: PPP (2009-present)

Muhammad Ayub Shah (Urdu: محمد ایوب شاہ) is a Pakistani politician who is currently serving as a member of the Gilgit-Baltistan Council since 12 November 2021. He also served as a member of the Gilgit-Baltistan Assembly from 2009 to 2014. He belongs to Pakistan Peoples Party.

== Political career ==
He was elected to the Gilgit-Baltistan Assembly from GBA-21 Ghizer-III as an independent candidate in the 2009 Gilgit-Baltistan Assembly election. He received 5,272 votes and defeated Ghulam Muhammad, a candidate of Pakistan People's Party (PPP). After the election, he joined PPP.

He contested the 2015 Gilgit-Baltistan Assembly election from GBA-21 Ghizer-III as a candidate of PPP, but was unsuccessful. He received 4,081 votes and was defeated by Raja Jahanzaib, a candidate of Pakistan Tehreek-e-Insaf (PTI).

He contested the 2020 Gilgit-Baltistan Assembly election from GBA-21 Ghizer-III as a candidate of PPP, but was unsuccessful. He received 3,430 votes and was defeated by Ghulam Muhammad, a candidate of Pakistan Muslim League (N) (PML(N)).

On 12 November 2021, he was elected to the Gilgit-Baltistan Council as a candidate of PPP.

He contested the 2026 Gilgit Baltistan Assembly election from GBA-21 Ghizer-III as a candidate of PPP, but was unsuccessful. He received 6,685 votes and was defeated by Aman Ali, an independent candidate.
