= Muhammad Dilpazir =

Pakistani politician from Gilgit-Baltistan

- محمد دلپذیر

Member of the Gilgit-Baltistan Assembly
- Incumbent
- Assumed office 13 July 2026
- Preceded by: Shah Baig
- Constituency: GBA-15 Diamer-I

Personal details
- Party: Istehkam-e-Pakistan Party (2026-present)
- Other political affiliations: Independent (2015-2026)

Muhammad Dilpazir is a Pakistani politician who has been a member of the Gilgit-Baltistan Assembly since July 2026.

== Political career ==
Dilpazir contested the 2015 Gilgit-Baltistan Assembly election from GBA-15 Diamer-I as an independent candidate, but was unsuccessful. He received 19 votes and was defeated by Shah Baig, a candidate of Jamiat Ulema-e-Islam (F) (JUI(F)).

He contested the 2020 Gilgit-Baltistan Assembly election from GBA-15 Diamer-I as an independent candidate, but was unsuccessful. He received 2,517 votes and was defeated by Shah Baig, another independent candidate.

He was elected to the Gilgit-Baltistan Assembly from GBA-15 Diamer-I as an independent candidate in the 2026 Gilgit Baltistan Assembly election. On election day, which was 9 June 2026, he initially received 5,962 votes and defeated Wali ur Rehman, a candidate of Jamiat Ulema-e-Islam (F). On 19 June, the Supreme Appellate Court Gilgit-Baltistan (SACGB) accepted a petition by Rehman, and suspended the election results. On 6 July, after concluding the case, the SACGB ordered re-polling to be held at one polling station. On 12 July, re-polling was held, and Dilpazir won with 6,033 votes.

On 16 June 2026, after initially being declared the victor, he joined Istehkam-e-Pakistan Party (IPP). He was sworn in on 13 July 2026.
