= Muhammad Ali Akhtar =

Pakistani politician from Gilgit-Baltistan

- محمد علی اختر

Member of the Gilgit-Baltistan Assembly
- Incumbent
- Assumed office 22 June 2026
- Preceded by: Muhammad Ayub Waziri
- Constituency: GBA-4 Nagar-I
- In office 10 December 2009 – 9 December 2014
- Succeeded by: Muhammad Ali Haidar
- Constituency: GBA-4 Gilgit-IV

Minister for Finance, Gilgit-Baltistan
- Incumbent
- Assumed office 27 July 2026
- Chief Minister: Amjad Hussain Azar

Minister for Finance, Revenue, and Cooperatives, Gilgit-Baltistan
- In office 24 April 2010 – 9 December 2014
- Chief Minister: Syed Mehdi Shah

Personal details
- Party: Pakistan People's Party

Muhammad Ali Akhtar is a Pakistani politician who has served as a member of the Gilgit-Baltistan Assembly since June 2026, and previously served in this role from December 2009 to December 2014. He also served as the region's Minister for Finance from April 2010 to December 2014.

== Political career ==
Akhtar was elected to the Gilgit-Baltistan Assembly from GBA-4 Gilgit-IV as a candidate of Pakistan People's Party (PPP) in the 2009 Gilgit-Baltistan Assembly election. He received 3,885 votes and defeated Muhammad Ali, an independent candidate.

On 24 April 2010, he was sworn into the cabinet of Chief Minister Syed Mehdi Shah as the Minister for Finance, Revenue and Cooperatives. He served in this position until the end of the assembly's term on 9 December 2014.

He contested the 2015 Gilgit-Baltistan Assembly election from GBA-4 Hunza-Nagar-I as an independent candidate, but was unsuccessful. He received 11 votes and was defeated by Muhammad Ali Haidar, a candidate of Islami Tehreek Pakistan (ITP).

He was re-elected to the Gilgit-Baltistan Assembly from GBA-4 Nagar-I as a candidate of PPP in the 2026 Gilgit Baltistan Assembly election. He received 7,973 votes and defeated Muhammad Ayub Waziri, a candidate of ITP.

On 27 July 2026, he was sworn into the cabinet of Chief Minister Amjad Hussain Azar as the Minister for Finance.
