= Shamsul Haq Lone =

Pakistani politician from Gilgit-Baltistan

Shams ul Haq Lone
- شمس الحق لون

Member of the Gilgit Baltistan Assembly
- In office 25 November 2020 – 24 November 2025
- Preceded by: Barkat Jamil
- Succeeded by: Rana Muhammad Farooq
- Constituency: GBA-14 (Astore-II)

Provincial Minister of Interior
- In office 18 July 2023 – 24 November 2025
- Chief Minister: Gulbar Khan

Personal details
- Born: 10 December 1976 (age 49) Astore, Gilgit-Baltistan
- Party: IPP (2026-present)
- Other political affiliations: PTI (2020-2025)

Shams ul Haq Lone (born 10 December 1976) is a Pakistani politician who had been a member of the Gilgit Baltistan Assembly from November 2020 to November 2025.

== Political career ==
Lone contested the 2020 Gilgit-Baltistan Assembly election on 15 November 2020 from GBA-14 Astore-II on the ticket of Pakistan Tehreek-e-Insaf. He won the election by the margin of 2,469 votes over the runner up Muzaffar Ali of Pakistan Peoples Party. He garnered 5,354 votes while Ali received 2,885 votes.

His party membership was terminated on 8 September 2025.

He joined the Istehkam-e-Pakistan Party (IPP) on 11 February 2026.

He contested the 2026 Gilgit Baltistan Assembly election from GBA-14 Astore-II as a candidate of IPP, but was unsuccessful. He received 5,144 votes, placing third, and was defeated by Rana Muhammad Farooq, a candidate of Pakistan Muslim League (N) (PML(N)).
