= Javed Ali Manwa =

Pakistani politician from Gilgit-Baltistan

Javaid Ali Manwa

Member of the Gilgit Baltistan Assembly Incumbent
- In office 25 November 2020 – 24 November 2025
- Preceded by: Rizwan Ali
- Succeeded by: Zulfiqar Ali Murad
- Constituency: GBA-5 (Nagar-II)

Minister for Finance Gilgit-Baltistan
- In office December 2020 – July 2023
- Preceded by: Haji Akber Taban
- Succeeded by: Engr.Muhammad Ismail

Personal details
- Born: Nagar Khas District Nagar
- Party: PML(N) (2026-present)
- Other political affiliations: PTI (2020-2023)

Javaid Ali Manwa is a Pakistani politician from Gilgit Baltistan, who had been a member of the Gilgit Baltistan Assembly from November 2020 to November 2025. He had been the Minister for Finance during first part of tenure in the Assembly, till the Cabinet dissolved owing to disqualification of the Chief Minister GB by the court.

Mr. Manwa went for the opposition benches, after the PTI forward block led coalition government field in on July 13, 2023.

Mr. Manwa held the portfolio of Chairman Standing Committee on Home and Prisons department along with additional portfolios of Services and GAD along with Law reforms and Parliamentary Affairs.

== Political career ==
Manwa contested the 2020 Gilgit-Baltistan Assembly election on 15 November 2020 from GBA-5 Nagar-II as an Independent candidate. He won the election by the margin of 720 votes over the runner up Rizwan Ali of Majlis Wahdat-e-Muslimeen. He garnered 2,570 votes while Ali received 1,850 votes. After winning the election, Manwa joined Pakistan Tehreek-e-Insaf.

On 6 July 2023, he announced his resignation from the basic membership of the PTI, alluding to the 2023 Pakistani protests as the reason.

He contested the 2026 Gilgit Baltistan Assembly election from GBA-5 Nagar-II as a candidate of Pakistan Muslim League (N) (PML(N)), but was unsuccessful. He received 1,987 votes, placing fourth, and was defeated by Zulfiqar Ali Murad, a candidate of Pakistan People's Party (PPP).
