= Abdul Hameed (Pakistani politician) =

Pakistani politician from Gilgit-Baltistan

Haji Abdul Hameed
- عبد الحمید

Member of the Gilgit Baltistan Assembly
- In office 25 November 2020 – 24 November 2025
- Preceded by: Ghulam Hussain
- Succeeded by: Anwar Ali
- Constituency: GBA-23 (Ghanche-II)

Provincial Minister of Local Government
- In office 18 July 2023 – 24 Nov 2025
- Governor: Syed Mehdi Shah
- Chief Minister: Gulbar Khan

Personal details
- Party: PPP (2024-present)
- Other political affiliations: PTI (2020-2024)

Abdul Hameed is a Pakistani politician who had been a member of the Gilgit Baltistan Assembly from November 2020 to November 2025.

== Political career ==
Hameed contested the 2020 Gilgit-Baltistan Assembly election on 15 November 2020 from GBA-23 Ghanche-II as an Independent candidate. He won the election by the margin of 370 votes over the runner up Amina Ansari of Pakistan Tehreek-e-Insaf (PTI). He garnered 3,666 votes while Ansari received 3,296 votes. After winning the election, Hameed joined PTI.

He joined the Pakistan People's Party (PPP) on 20 April 2024.

His membership of PTI was terminated on 8 September 2025.

He contested the 2026 Gilgit-Baltistan Assembly election from GBA-23 Ghanche-II as an independent candidate, but was unsuccessful. He received 4,148 votes and was defeated by Anwar Ali, an independent candidate.
