= Haider Khan (Pakistani politician) =

Pakistani politician from Gilgit-Baltistan

Member of the Gilgit Baltistan Assembly
- In office 24 June 2015 – 23 Juen 2020
- Preceded by: Rehmat Khaliq
- Succeeded by: Rehmat Khaliq
- Constituency: GBA-17 Diamer-III

Personal details
- Party: Pakistan Tehreek-e-Insaf (2020-present)
- Other political affiliations: Pakistan Muslim League (N) (2015-2020)

Haider Khan is a Pakistani politician who had been a member of the Gilgit Baltistan Assembly from June 2015 to June 2020.

== Political career ==
Khan was elected to the Gilgit-Baltistan Assembly from GBA-17 Diamer-III as a candidate of Pakistan Muslim League (N) (PML(N)) in the 2015 Gilgit-Baltistan Assembly election. He received 4,184 votes, and defeated Rehmat Khaliq, a candidate of Jamiat Ulema-e-Islam (F) (JUI(F)).

He contested the 2020 Gilgit-Baltistan Assembly election on 15 November 2020 from constituency GBA-17 Diamer-III on the ticket of Pakistan Tehreek-e-Insaf (PTI), but was unsuccessful. He was defeated by Rehmat Khaliq, a candidate of JUI(F).
