= GBA-4 Nagar-I =

Constituency for the Gilgit Baltistan Assembly

- Constituency for the Gilgit Baltistan Assembly
- District: Nagar District
- Electorate: 18,805

Current constituency
- Created: 2009
- Party: Pakistan People's Party
- Member: Muhammad Ali Akhtar
- Created from: GBA-4 Hunza-Nagar I

GBA-4 Nagar-I is a constituency of Gilgit Baltistan Assembly which is currently represented by the Muhammad Ali Akhtar of Pakistan People's Party.

== History ==
Before 2015, the constituency was in the Hunza-Nagar District. In 2015, when Nagar was made a separate district, GBA-4 was made its constituency.

== Members ==
Election	Member	Party	Votes received
2009	Muhammad Ali Akhtar	Pakistan People's Party	3,890
2015	Muhammad Ali Haidar	Islami Tehreek Pakistan	5,039
2017	Javed Hussain	Pakistan People's Party	6,888
2020	Amjad Hussain Azar (Note: Azar never took the oath as a member of this constituency, as he vacated it in favour of GBA-1 Gilgit-I, which he also won in the 2020 election.)	Pakistan People's Party	6,104
2021	Muhammad Ayub Waziri	Islami Tehreek Pakistan	5,422
2026	Muhammad Ali Akhtar	Pakistan People's Party	7,973

== Election results ==
=== 2009 ===
Muhammad Ali Akhtar of Pakistan Peoples Party became member of assembly by getting 3,885 votes.

2009 election
Party	Candidate	Votes	%	±%
PPP	Muhammad Ali Akhtar	3,890	34.26	
Independent	Muhammad Ali	3,717	32.74	
Independent	Fida Hussain	2,126	18.72	
MQM	Muhammad Hassan	821	7.23	
Independent	Fida Ali	746	6.57	
Others		53	0.46	
Majority		173	1.52	
Turnout		11,353	53.54	
PPP win (new seat)				

=== 2015 ===
Doctor Muhammad Ali Haidar of Islami Tehreek Pakistan won by getting 5,039 votes.

2015 election
Party	Candidate	Votes	%	±%
ITP	Doctor Muhammad Ali Haidar	5,039	37.16	
PPP	Kashif Ali	4,091	30.17	
MWM	Ali Muhammad	3,014	22.22	
PML-N	Haji Fida Hussain	1,361	10.04	
PTI	Muhammad Javid	46	0.34	
Independent	Muhammad Ali Akhtar	11	0.08	
Majority		948	6.99	
Turnout		13,562	72.11	
ITP gain from PPP		Swing		

=== 2017 by-election ===
Doctor Muhammad Ali Haidar died of cardiac arrest in February 2017. Javed Hussain of PPP won by securing 6,888 votes.

=== 2020 ===
In the 2020 elections, Amjad Hussain Azar of PPP won 6,104 seats and won his seat. He later vacated it in favour of GBA-1 Gilgit-I.

=== 2021 by-election ===
ITP's Muhammad Ayub Waziri had won by securing 5,422 votes, defeating PTI's Agha Zulfiqar Ali who got 5,085 votes.

By-election 2021: GBA-4 Nagar-I
Party	Candidate	Votes	%	±%
ITP	Muhammad Ayub Waziri	5,422	36.12	
PTI	Agha Zulfiqar Ali	5,085	33.88	
PPP	Javid Hussain	4,348	28.97	
MWN	Rizwan Ali	117	0.78	
PML-N	Arif Hussain	8	0.06	
Independent	Abbas Ali	22	0.15	
Independent	Ali Muhammad	5	0.03	
Independent	Fida Ali	4	0.02	
Majority		337	1.43	
Turnout		15,011	63.88	
ITP gain from PPP		Swing		

=== 2026 ===
General elections were held on 7 June 2026. Muhammad Ali Akhtar, a candidate of PPP, won the election with 7,973 votes.

Election 2026: GBA-4 Nagar-I
Party	Candidate	Votes	%	±%
PPP	Muhammad Ali Akhtar	7,973	42.22	
ITP	Muhammad Ayub Waziri	6,805	36.03	
Independent	Ali Muhammad	3,336	17.66	
PML(N)	Imtiaz Hussain	694	3.67	
Others	Others (seventeen candidates)	78	0.41	
Valid ballots		18,886	98.17	
Rejected ballots		353	1.83	
Turnout		19,239	64.19	
Majority		1,168	6.18	
Registered electors		29,970		
PPP gain from ITP				
