= GBA-14 Astore-II =

Constituency for the Gilgit Baltistan Assembly

- Constituency for the Gilgit Baltistan Assembly
- District: Astore District
- Electorate: 33,378

Current constituency
- Created: 2009
- Party: Pakistan Muslim League (N)
- Member: Rana Muhammad Farooq

GBA-14 Astore-II is a constituency of Gilgit Baltistan Assembly, which is currently being held by Rana Muhammad Farooq of Pakistan Muslim League (N).

== Members ==
Election	Member	Party	Votes received
2009	Muhammad Naseer	Pakistan People's Party	1,915 votes
2015	Barkat Jamil	Pakistan Muslim League (N)	3,994 votes
2020	Shamsul Haq Lone	Pakistan Tehreek-e-Insaf	5,237 votes
2026	Rana Muhammad Farooq	Pakistan Muslim League (N)	7,058 votes

== Election results ==
=== Election 2009 ===
Muhammad Naseer of Pakistan People's Party (PPP) won this seat with 1,915 votes.

=== Election 2015 ===
Barkat Jamil of Pakistan Muslim League (N) (PML(N)) won this seat with 3,994 votes.

=== Election 2020 ===
Shamsul Haq Lone of Pakistan Tehreek-e-Insaf (PTI) won this seat with 5,237 votes.

=== Election 2026 ===
General elections were held on 7 June 2026. Rana Muhammad Farooq, a candidate of PML(N), won the election with 7,058 votes.

Election 2026: GBA-14 Astore-II
Party	Candidate	Votes	%	±%
PML(N)	Rana Muhammad Farooq	7,058	35.15	
PPP	Syed Muhammad Abbas	5,891	29.34	
IPP	Shamsul Haq Lone	5,144	25.62	
Independent	Barkat Jamil	915	4.56	
Others	Others (twenty-nine candidates)	1,070	5.33	
Valid ballots		20,078	100.00	
Rejected ballots		0	0.00	
Turnout		20,078	53.95	
Majority		1,167	5.81	
Registered electors		37,219		
PML(N) gain from PTI				
