= Imam Malik (Pakistani politician) =

Pakistani politician from Gilgit-Baltistan

Member of the Gilgit-Baltistan Assembly
- In office 22 June 2026 – 11 September 2026
- Preceded by: Muhammad Anwar
- Succeeded by: Attaullah Shah
- Constituency: GBA-16 Diamer-II

Personal details
- Party: Istehkam-e-Pakistan Party (2026-present)
- Other political affiliations: Independent (2026)

Imam Malik is a Pakistani politician who has served as a member of the Gilgit-Baltistan Assembly since June 2026.

== Political career ==
Malik was elected to the Gilgit-Baltistan Assembly from GBA-16 Diamer-II as an independent candidate in the 2026 Gilgit Baltistan Assembly election. He received 6,320 votes and defeated Attaullah Shah, a candidate of Pakistan People's Party. He later joined Istehkam-e-Pakistan Party (IPP). The Election Commission Gilgit-Baltistan (ECGB) notified him as the returned candidate on 19 June 2026, even though the final consolidated results were not published. Shah and his supporters also alleged that postal ballots had not been counted yet. After a petition filed by Shah, an election tribunal suspended Malik's victory notification on 11 September, and ordered the returning officer of the constituency to verify and count all postal ballots. After doing so, the returning officer notified the new results on 13 September, which saw Malik receiving 6,605 votes and being defeated by Shah, who received 6,618 votes. Malik later submitted an appeal of this decision to the Supreme Appellate Court Gilgit-Baltistan, but it was rejected on 18 September.
