= Malik Kifayatur Rehman =

Pakistani politician from Gilgit-Baltistan

- ملک کفایت الرحمان

Deputy Speaker of the Gilgit-Baltistan Assembly
- Incumbent
- Assumed office 22 June 2026
- Preceded by: Sadia Danish

Member of the Gilgit-Baltistan Assembly
- Incumbent
- Assumed office 22 June 2026
- Preceded by: Gulbar Khan
- Constituency: GBA-18 Diamer-IV

Personal details
- Party: Pakistan Muslim League (N) (2026-present)
- Other party: Independent (2020)

Malik Kifayatur Rehman is a Pakistani politician who has served as the Deputy Speaker of the Gilgit-Baltistan Assembly since 22 June 2026, and also as a member of the Assembly from that date. He is the son of Malik Muhammad Miskeen, a former Speaker of the Northern Areas Legislative Council.

== Political career ==
Rehman contested the 2015 Gilgit-Baltistan Assembly election from GBA-18 Diamer-IV as an independent candidate, but was unsuccessful. He received 3,544 votes and was defeated by Gulbar Khan, a candidate of Pakistan Tehreek-e-Insaf (PTI).

He was elected to the Gilgit-Baltistan Assembly from GBA-18 Diamer-IV as a candidate of Pakistan Muslim League (N) (PML(N)) in the 2026 Gilgit Baltistan Assembly election. He received 6,081 votes and defeated former Chief Minister Gulbar Khan, a candidate of Istehkam-e-Pakistan Party (IPP).

In the morning of 22 June 2026, he took the oath of office to become a member of the Assembly. In the evening of the same day, he was elected unopposed as the Deputy Speaker of the Assembly.
