= Jamil Ahmad (Gilgit-Baltistan politician) =

Pakistani politician from Gilgit-Baltistan

- جمیل احمد

Member of the Gilgit-Baltistan Assembly
- In office 21 August 2023 – 24 November 2025
- Preceded by: Fatehullah Khan
- Succeeded by: Hafiz Hafeezur Rehman
- Constituency: GBA-2 Gilgit-II
- In office 10 December 2009 – 9 December 2014
- Constituency: Reserved seat for technocrats

Deputy Speaker of the Gilgit-Baltistan Assembly
- In office 11 December 2009 – 9 December 2014
- Speaker: Wazir Baig
- Preceded by: Position established
- Succeeded by: Jafarullah Khan

Personal details
- Party: Pakistan People's Party

Jamil Ahmad is a Pakistani politician who had served as a member of the Gilgit-Baltistan Assembly from August 2023 to November 2025, and previously served in this role from December 2009 to December 2014. He also served as the Deputy Speaker of the Assembly from December 2009 to December 2014.

== Political career ==
Ahmad was elected to the Gilgit-Baltistan Assembly on a reserved seat for technocrats as a candidate of Pakistan People's Party (PPP) in the 2009 Gilgit-Baltistan Assembly election. In the same election, he contested a general seat from GBA-2 Gilgit-II as a candidate of PPP, but was unsuccessful. He received 4,782 votes and was defeated by Deedar Ali, an independent candidate.

On 11 December 2009, he was elected as the Deputy Speaker of the Assembly.

He contested the 2015 Gilgit-Baltistan Assembly election from GBA-2 Gilgit-II as a candidate of PPP, but was unsuccessful. He received 7,176 votes and was defeated by Hafiz Hafeezur Rehman, a candidate of Pakistan Muslim League (N) (PML(N)).

He contested the 2020 Gilgit-Baltistan Assembly election from GBA-2 Gilgit-II as a candidate of PPP, but was unsuccessful. He received 6,694 votes and was defeated by Fatehullah Khan, a candidate of Pakistan Tehreek-e-Insaf (PTI), who received 6,696 votes. After a re-count, it was announced that Khan had received 6,860 votes and Ahmad received 6,764 votes. Ahmad challenged these results and on 18 August 2023, an election tribunal ruled in his favour. He was sworn in as a member of the Assembly on 21 August 2023. Khan challenged this decision in the Supreme Appellate Court Gilgit-Baltistan and on 28 October 2023, the court restored his membership and directed the election tribunal to make a fresh decision. On 23 October 2024, the tribunal once again declared Ahmad's victory over Khan, with National Database and Registration Authority declaring over 1,700 postal ballots in favour of Khan as "fake".

He contested the 2026 Gilgit Baltistan Assembly election from GBA-2 Gilgit-II as a candidate of PPP, but was unsuccessful. He received 9,319 votes and was defeated by Hafiz Hafeezur Rehman, a candidate of PML(N).
