= Rehmat Khaliq =

Pakistani politician from Gilgit-Baltistan

- رحمت خالق

Member of Gilgit-Baltistan Assembly
- In office 25 November 2020 – 24 November 2025
- Preceded by: Haider Khan
- Succeeded by: Muhammad Naseem
- Constituency: GBA-17 Diamer-III
- In office 10 December 2009 – 9 December 2014
- Succeeded by: Haider Khan
- Constituency: GBA-17 Diamer-III

Personal details
- Party: JUI (F) (2009-present)

Rehmat Khaliq is a Pakistani politician who had been a member of the Gilgit Baltistan Assembly from November 2020 to November 2025 and from December 2009 to December 2014.

== Political career ==
Khaliq was elected to the Gilgit-Baltistan Assembly from GBA-17 Diamer-III as a candidate of Jamiat Ulema-e-Islam (F) (JUI(F)) in the 2009 Gilgit-Baltistan Assembly election. He received 4,403 votes and defeated Haider Khan, a candidate of Pakistan Muslim League (N) (PML(N)).

He contested the 2015 Gilgit-Baltistan Assembly election from GBA-17 Diamer-III as a candidate of JUI(F), but was unsuccessful. He received 3,689 votes and was defeated by Haider Khan, a candidate of PML(N).

He contested the 2020 Gilgit-Baltistan Assembly election on 15 November 2020 from GBA-17 Diamer-III on the ticket from JUI(F). He won the election by the margin of 263 votes over the PTI candidate Haider Khan. He secured 5,389 votes and Khan secured 5,126 votes.

He contested the 2026 Gilgit Baltistan Assembly election from GBA-17 Diamer-III as a candidate of JUI(F), but was unsuccessful. He received 5,286 votes and was defeated by Muhammad Naseem, a candidate of Pakistan People's Party (PPP).

== See also ==
- List of Deobandis
