= Fatehullah Khan =

Pakistani politician from Gilgit-Baltistan

- فتح الله خان

Member of the Gilgit Baltistan Assembly
- In office 25 November 2020 – 24 October 2024
- Preceded by: Hafiz Hafeezur Rehman
- Succeeded by: Jamil Ahmad
- Constituency: GBA-2 (Gilgit-II)

Provincial Minister of Planning and Development
- In office 18 July 2023 – 24 October 2024
- Chief Minister: Gulbar Khan

Personal details
- Party: IPP (2026-present)
- Other political affiliations: PTI (2020-2023)

Fatehullah Khan is a Pakistani politician who has been a member of the Gilgit Baltistan Assembly since November 2020.

== Political career ==
Khan contested the 2020 Gilgit-Baltistan Assembly election on 15 November 2020 from constituency GBA-2 (Gilgit-II) on the ticket of Pakistan Tehreek-e-Insaf. He won the election by the margin of 2 votes over the runner up Jamil Ahmad of Pakistan Peoples Party. He garnered 6,696 votes while Ahmed received 6,694 votes. A recount was conducted, after which his victory margin increased to 96 votes.

His party membership was terminated in 2023.

On 24 October 2024, he was de-seated after an election tribunal declared Ahmad as the winner from his constituency.

He joined the Istehkam-e-Pakistan Party on 11 February 2026.
