= Raja Jalal Hussain Maqpoon =

Politician in Gilgit-Baltistan

- راجہ جلال حسین مقپون

7th Governor of Gilgit-Baltistan
- In office 30 September 2018 – 11 April 2022
- President: Arif Alvi
- Prime Minister: Imran Khan
- Chief Minister: Hafiz Hafeezur Rehman; Mir Afzal; Khalid Khurshid
- Preceded by: Mir Ghazanfar Ali Khan
- Succeeded by: Syed Mehdi Shah

Personal details
- Born: Raja Jalal Hussain Maqpoon; 20 May 1971 (age 55) Skardu, Gilgit-Baltistan,
- Party: IPP (2026-present)
- Other political affiliations: PTI (2020-2026)
- Profession: Politician

Raja Jalal Hussain Maqpoon (Urdu: راجہ جلال حسین مقپون) is a Pakistani politician who served as the 7th Governor of Gilgit-Baltistan from 2018 to 2022.

== Political career ==
Maqpoon contested the 2015 Gilgit-Baltistan Assembly election as a candidate of Pakistan Tehreek-e-Insaf (PTI) from GBA-7 Skardu-I, but was unsuccessful. He came in second receiving 3,330 votes and losing the seat to Akbar Khan, a candidate of Pakistan Muslim League (N) (PML(N)), who received 3,331 votes.

He was appointed the governor of Gilgit-Baltistan by President Arif Alvi on the advice of Prime Minister Imran Khan after the resignation of Mir Ghazanfar Ali Khan. On 30 September 2018, he took the oath of office as Governor. On 11 April 2022, he resigned.

He joined the Istehkam-e-Pakistan Party (IPP) on 11 February 2026.

He contested the 2026 Gilgit Baltistan Assembly election from GBA-7 Skardu-I as a candidate of IPP, but was unsuccessful. He received 4,134 votes and was defeated by Syed Tauqeer Mehdi, a candidate of Pakistan People's Party (PPP).

== See also ==
- List of current Pakistani governors
