= Shah Baig =

Pakistani politician from Gilgit-Baltistan

- شاہ بیگ

Member of the Gilgit Baltistan Assembly
- In office 25 November 2020 – 24 November 2025
- Succeeded by: Muhammad Dilpazir
- Constituency: GBA-15 Diamer-I
- In office 24 June 2015 – 23 June 2020
- Preceded by: Bashir Ahmad
- Constituency: GBA-15 Diamer-I

Leader of the Opposition of the Gilgit Baltistan Assembly
- In office 2 July 2015 – 14 November 2017
- Preceded by: Bashir Ahmad
- Succeeded by: Muhammad Shafi

Personal details
- Party: IPP (2026-present)
- Other political affiliations: PTI (2020-2025); JUI(F) (2015-2020); MQM (2009-2015)

Shah Baig is a Pakistani politician who had been a member of the Gilgit Baltistan Assembly from November 2020 to November 2025 and from June 2015 to June 2020. He had also been the Leader of the Opposition in the Gilgit Baltistan Assembly from July 2015 to November 2017.

== Political career ==
Baig contested the 2009 Gilgit-Baltistan Assembly election from GBA-15 Diamer-I as a candidate of Muttahida Qaumi Movement (MQM), but was unsuccessful. He received 1,753 votes and was defeated by Basheer Ahmed Khan, a candidate of Pakistan Muslim League (Q) (PML(Q)).

Baig was elected to the Gilgit-Baltistan Assembly from GBA-15 Diamer-I as a candidate of Jamiat Ulema-e-Islam (F) (JUI(F)) in the 2015 Gilgit-Baltistan Assembly election. He received 3,713 votes and defeated Fidaullah, a candidate of Pakistan People's Party (PPP).

He contested the 2020 Gilgit-Baltistan Assembly election on 15 November 2020 from GBA-15 (Diamer-I) as an Independent candidate. He won the election by the margin of 168 votes over the Independent runner up Muhammad Dilpazir. He garnered 2,685 votes while Dilpazir received 2,517 votes. After winning the election, Baig joined Pakistan Tehreek-e-Insaf.

His party membership was terminated on 8 September 2025.

He joined Istehkam-e-Pakistan Party (IPP) on 11 February 2026.

He contested the 2026 Gilgit-Baltistan Assembly election from GBA-15 Diamer-I as a candidate of IPP, but was unsuccessful. He received 3,384 votes, placing fifth, and was defeated by Muhammad Dilpazir, an independent candidate.
