= Anwar Ali (Pakistani politician) =

Pakistani politician from Gilgit-Baltistan

- انور علی

Member of the Gilgit-Baltistan Assembly
- Incumbent
- Assumed office 22 June 2026
- Preceded by: Abdul Hameed
- Constituency: GBA-23 Ghanche-II

Personal details
- Party: Pakistan Tehreek-e-Insaf (2026-present)
- Other political affiliations: Independent (2026)

Anwar Ali is a Pakistani politician who has served as a member of the Gilgit-Baltistan Assembly since June 2026.

== Political career ==
Ali was elected to the Gilgit-Baltistan Assembly from GBA-23 Ghanche-II as an independent candidate in the 2026 Gilgit Baltistan Assembly election. He received 13,161 votes and defeated Abdul Hameed, an independent candidate. He later joined Istehkam-e-Pakistan Party (IPP).
