= Mushtaq Hussain =

Pakistani politician from Gilgit-Baltistan

- مشتاق حسین

Member of the Gilgit Baltistan Assembly
- In office 25 November 2020 – 24 November 2025
- Preceded by: Muhammad Ibrahim Sanai
- Succeeded by: Muhammad Ibrahim Sanai
- Constituency: GBA-22 (Ghanche-I)

Personal details
- Party: IPP (2026-present)
- Other political affiliations: PTI (2020-2025)

Mushtaq Hussain is a Pakistani politician who has been a member of the Gilgit Baltistan Assembly from November 2020 to November 2025.

== Political career ==
Mushtaq contested the 2020 Gilgit-Baltistan Assembly election on 15 November 2020 from GBA-22 (Ghanche-I) as an Independent candidate. He won the election by the margin of 1,106 votes over the runner up Muhammad Ibrahim Sanai of Pakistan Tehreek-e-Insaf (PTI). He garnered 6,051 votes while Sanai received 4,945 votes. After winning the election, Mushtaq joined PTI.

His party membership was terminated on 8 September 2025.
