= GBA-2 Gilgit-II =

Constituency for the Gilgit Baltistan Assembly

- Constituency for the Gilgit Baltistan Assembly
- Region: Gilgit District
- Electorate: 33,733

Current constituency
- Created: 2009
- Party: Pakistan Muslim League (N)
- Member: Hafiz Hafeezur Rehman

GBA-2 Gilgit-II is a constituency of Gilgit Baltistan Assembly which is currently represented by Hafiz Hafeezur Rehman of Pakistan Muslim League (N).

== Members ==
Election	Member	Party	Votes received
2009	Deedar Ali	Independent then joined Islami Tehreek Pakistan (Note: Elected as an independent, but later joined ITP.)	5,241 votes
2015	Hafiz Hafeezur Rehman	Pakistan Muslim League (N)	10,739 votes
2020	Fatehullah Khan	Pakistan Tehreek-e-Insaf	6860 votes
2023	Jamil Ahmad	Pakistan People's Party	N/A
2026	Hafiz Hafeezur Rehman	Pakistan Muslim League (N)	14,788 votes

== 2009 election ==
Deedar Ali an independent politician became member of assembly by getting 5241 votes. He later joined Islami Tehreek Pakistan (ITP).

2009: Gilgit-II
Party	Candidate	Votes	%
Independent	Deedar Ali	5,486	25.34
PPPP	Jamil Ahmad	4,782	22.09
PML-N	Hafiz Hafeezur Rehman	4,563	21.08
MQM	Altaf Hussain	281	1.27
PML (Q)	Muhammad Aslam	2,180	10.07
Turnout		21,646	35.05
Independent gain from PPP		Swing	

== 2015 election ==
Hafiz Hafeez Ur Rehman of Pakistan Muslim League (N) won this seat by getting 10,739 votes and became Chief Minister of Gilgit Baltistan.

2015: Gilgit-II
Party	Candidate	Votes	%
PML-N	Hafiz Hafeez Ur Rehman	10,739	48.29
PPPP	Jamil Ahmad	7,176	32.27
PTI	Fatehullah Khan	2,561	11.51
JI	Habib Ur Rehman	844	3.79
APML	Karim Khan	583	2.62
Independent	Faqeer Shah	683	3.62
MQM	Tariq Hussain	278	1.25
Independent	Parveen Ghazi	16	0.07
MWM	Muhammad Mazhar Abbas	08	0.03
PAT	Shukat Alam	03	0.01
JUI-F	Moulana Mujahid	01	0.00
Turnout		22,237	65.92
PML(N) gain from [[Independent|Independent]]		Swing	

== 2020 election ==
General elections were held on 15 November 2020. Fatehullah Khan, a candidate of Pakistan Tehreek-e-Insaf, won the election with 6,860 votes.

Party	Candidate	Votes
Pakistan Tehreek-e-Insaf	Fatehullah Khan	6860
Pakistan Peoples Party	Jamil Ahmad	6764
Pakistan Muslim League (N)	Hafiz Hafeezur Rehman	5820
Pakistan Muslim League (Q)	Nasir Mir	1540
Independent	Ghulab Shah	1455
Jamaat-e-Islami Pakistan	Habib ur Rehman	825
Independent	Ashfaq Hussain	704
Islami Tehreek Pakistan	Faqeer Shah	494

Ahmad challenged these results and on 18 August 2023, an election tribunal ruled in his favour. He was sworn in as a member of the Assembly on 21 August 2023. Khan challenged this decision in the Supreme Appellate Court Gilgit-Baltistan and on 28 October 2023, the court restored his membership and directed the election tribunal to make a fresh decision. On 23 October 2024, the tribunal once again declared Ahmad's victory over Khan, with National Database and Registration Authority declaring over 1,700 postal ballots in favour of Khan as "fake".

== 2026 election ==
General elections were held on 7 June 2026. Hafiz Hafeezur Rehman, a candidate of Pakistan Muslim League (N), was elected with 14,788 votes.

Election 2026: GBA-2 Giglit-II
Party	Candidate	Votes	%	±%
PML(N)	Hafiz Hafeezur Rehman	14,788	44.31	
PPP	Jamil Ahmad	9,319	27.92	
IPP	Fatehullah Khan	4,061	12.17	
PTI	Ateeq Pirzada (Note: PTI members who contested in the general election ran as independent candidates aligned with the party because the Election Commission Gilgit-Baltistan prohibited the PTI election symbol.)	2,020	6.05	
Independent	Mir Muhammad Jalal-ud-Din	776	2.33	
Independent	Jibran Rasheed Khan	653	1.96	
Independent	Ajmal Hussain	626	1.88	
JUI (F)	Asif Khan	536	1.61	
Others	Others (thirty-three candidates)	596	1.79	
Valid ballots		33,375	100.00	
Rejected ballots		0	0.00	
Turnout		33,375	59.58	
Majority		5,469	15.67	
Registered electors		56,019		
PML(N) gain from PTI				
