= GBA-21 Ghizer-III =

Constituency for the Gilgit Baltistan Assembly

- Constituency for the Gilgit Baltistan Assembly
- District: Gupis-Yasin and Ghizer
- Region: Ghizer
- Electorate: 27,577

Current constituency
- Created: 2009
- Party: Istehkam-e-Pakistan Party
- Member: Aman Ali

GBA-21 Ghizer-III is a constituency of Gilgit Baltistan Assembly which is currently represented by Aman Ali of Istehkam-e-Pakistan Party.

== Members ==
Election	Member	Party	Votes received
2009	Muhammad Ayub Shah	Pakistan People's Party (Note: Muhammad Ayub Shah was elected as an independent, but later joined PPP.)	3,206 votes
2015	Raja Jahanzaib	Pakistan Tehreek-e-Insaf	7,252 votes
2020	Ghulam Muhammad	Pakistan Muslim League (N)	4,609 votes
2026	Aman Ali	Istehkam-e-Pakistan Party (Note: Aman Ali was elected as an independent, but later joined IPP.)	9,978 votes

== Election results ==
=== 2009 ===
Muhammad Ayub Shah, an Independent politician, became a member of the Assembly by getting 3,206 votes. He later joined Pakistan People's Party (PPP).

=== 2015 ===
Raja Jahanzaib of PTI won this seat by getting 7,252 votes.

2015: Ghizer-III
Party	Candidate	Votes	%
PTI	Raja Jahanzaib	7,252	39.17
PML-N	Ghulam Muhammad	5,602	30.26
PPP	Muhammad Ayub Shah	4,081	22.04
APML	Jamsheed khan	887	4.79
PAT	Nadir Khan	304	1.64
MQM	Abdul Khaliq	150	0.81
Independents & Others		231	1.25
JUI-F	Muhammad Aziz	06	0.03
Turnout		18,513	67.13
PTI gain from Independent		Swing	

=== 2020 ===
General elections were held on 15 November 2020. Ghulam Muhammad, a candidate of Pakistan Muslim League (N) (PML(N)), won the election with 4,334 votes.

=== 2026 ===
General elections were held on 7 June 2026. Aman Ali, an independent candidate, won the election with 9,978 votes. He later joined Istehkam-e-Pakistan Party (IPP).

Election 2026: GBA-21 Ghizer-III
Party	Candidate	Votes	%	±%
Independent	Aman Ali	9,978	39.48	
PPP	Muhammad Ayub Shah	6,685	26.45	
PML(N)	Ghulam Muhammad	5,626	22.26	
PTI	Raja Jahanzaib (Note: PTI members who contested in the general election ran as independent candidates aligned with the party because the Election Commission Gilgit-Baltistan prohibited the PTI election symbol.)	943	3.73	
AWP	Muhammad Aslam	764	3.02	
JUI (F)	Wazir Hussain	379	1.50	
Independent	Gohar Shah	298	1.18	
Independent	Piyar Ali	178	0.70	
MQM-P	Shah Riaz	117	0.46	
Others	Others (eleven candidates)	303	1.20	
Valid ballots		25,271	99.20	
Rejected ballots		205	0.80	
Turnout		25,476	59.14	
Majority		3,293	13.03	
Registered electors		43,075		
Independent gain from PML(N)				
