= Mir Afzal =

Pakistani politician

Caretaker Chief Minister of Gilgit-Baltistan
- In office 24 June 2020 – 1 December 2020
- Governor: Raja Jalal Hussain Maqpoon
- Preceded by: Hafiz Hafeezur Rehman
- Succeeded by: Khalid Khurshid

Personal details
- Born: Mir Afzal Gilgit, Gilgit-Baltistan, Pakistan
- Occupation: Retired IGP

Mir Afzal (Urdu: میر افضل) was the caretaker Chief Minister of Gilgit-Baltistan from 24 June to 1 December 2020, and a retired Deputy Inspector General DIG in Gilgit-Baltistan Police. He belongs to Bunji in Astore District, in Gilgit-Baltistan.
