= GBA-17 Diamer-III =

Constituency for the Gilgit Baltistan Assembly

- Constituency for the Gilgit Baltistan Assembly
- District: Diamer District
- Electorate: 25,622

Current constituency
- Created: 2009
- Party: Pakistan People's Party
- Member: Muhammad Naseem

GBA-17 Diamer-III is a constituency of Gilgit Baltistan Assembly which is currently represented by Muhammad Naseem of Pakistan People's Party.

== Members ==
Election	Member	Party	Votes received
2009	Rehmat Khaliq	Jamiat Ulema-e-Islam (F)	4,403 votes
2015	Haider Khan	Pakistan Muslim League (N)	4,184 votes
2020	Rehmat Khaliq	Jamiat Ulema-e-Islam (F)	5,074 votes
2026	Muhammad Naseem	Pakistan People's Party	10,716 votes

== Election results ==
=== 2009 ===
Rehmat Khaliq of JUI-F became a member of the assembly in 2009 elections.

=== 2015 ===
Haider Khan of Pakistan Muslim League (N) won this seat by getting 4,184 votes.

=== 2020 ===
General elections were held on 15 November 2020. Rehmat Khaliq, a candidate of Jamiat Ulema-e-Islam (F) (JUI(F)), won the election.

=== 2026 ===
General elections were held on 7 June 2026. Muhammad Naseem, a candidate of Pakistan People's Party (PPP), won the election with 8,954 votes.

Election 2026: GBA-17 Diamer-III
Party	Candidate	Votes	%	±%
PPP	Muhammad Naseem	10,716	45.63	
JUI (F)	Rehmat Khaliq	6,989	29.76	
Independent	Abdul Kareem	4,000	17.03	
PML(N)	Muhammad Zaman	1,344	5.72	
PTI	Haji Kaman Khan (Note: PTI members who contested in the general election ran as independent candidates aligned with the party because the Election Commission Gilgit-Baltistan prohibited the PTI election symbol.)	187	0.80	
Independent	Raj Alam	107	0.46	
Others	Others (eight candidates)	140	0.60	
Valid ballots		23,483	98.57	
Rejected ballots		288	1.43	
Turnout		23,771	57.91	
Majority		3,727	15.87	
Registered electors		41,045		
PPP gain from JUI (F)				
