= Wazir Baig =

Pakiistani politician (b. 1942)

- وزیر بیگ

Speaker of the Gilgit Baltistan Legislative Assembly
- In office 11 December 2009 – 26 June 2015
- Deputy: Jamil Ahmad
- Preceded by: Position established
- Succeeded by: Fida Muhammad Nashad

3rd Governor of Gilgit Baltistan (Acting)
- In office 17 September 2010 – 26 January 2011
- Preceded by: Shama Khalid
- Succeeded by: Karam Ali Shah

Member of the Gilgit Baltistan Legislative Assembly
- In office 10 December 2009 – 10 December 2014
- Succeeded by: Mir Ghazanfar Ali Khan
- Constituency: GBLA-6 Gilgit-VI

Personal details
- Born: Hunza, Pakistan
- Party: Pakistan Peoples Party (PPP)

Mir Wazir Baig is a Pakistani politician from Gilgit-Baltistan who served as the first speaker of the Gilgit-Baltistan Assembly. He also served as the governor of Gilgit-Baltistan in 2010.

== Political career ==
Mir Wazir Baig was born in 1942 in Hunza, Pakistan. He started his political career as the president of the Hunza Students Movement aimed at putting an end to the rule of mirs. He demanded that people should be allowed to meet President Fazal Elahi Chaudhry during his visit to Hunza. Upon this Wazir Baig was tortured and was kept in prison till president completed the visit. Wazir Baig along with his supporters kept raising voice against the cruelties of the mir which came to an end in 1974 when Zulfikar Ali Bhutto dissolved the state. Wazir Baig started his career by joining Pakistan Peoples Party. He won his seat GBLA-6 and was elected as the first speaker of Gilgit Baltistan Assembly. Later on in September 2010, Wazir was appointed the Governor of Gilgit Baltistan.
