= GBA-23 Ghanche-II =

Constituency for the Gilgit Baltistan Assembly

- Constituency for the Gilgit Baltistan Assembly
- District: Ghanche District
- Electorate: 23,286

Current constituency
- Created: 2009
- Party: Istehkam-e-Pakistan Party
- Member: Anwar Ali

GBA-23 Ghanche-II is a constituency of Gilgit Baltistan Assembly which is currently represented by Anwar Ali of Istehkam-e-Pakistan Party.

== Members ==
Election	Member	Party	Votes received
2009	Mufti Muhammad Abdullah	Pakistan Muslim League (N)	4,240 votes
2013	Sultan Ali Khan	Pakistan Muslim League (N)	3,764 votes
2015	Ghulam Hussain	Pakistan Muslim League (N)	6,657 votes
2020	Abdul Hameed	Pakistan Tehreek-e-Insaf (Note: Abdul Hameed was elected as an independent, but later joined PTI.)	3,774 votes
2026	Anwar Ali	Istehkam-e-Pakistan Party (Note: Anwar Ali was elected as an independent, but later joined IPP.)	13,161 votes

== Election results ==
=== 2009 ===
Mufti Muhammad Abdullah of Pakistan Muslim League (N) (PML(N)) became member of assembly by getting 4,240 votes.

=== 2013 by-election ===
A by-election was held on 6 October 2013 due to the death of Mufti Muhammad Abdullah, the previous member from this seat. Sultan Ali Khan, a candidate of PML(N)), won the election with 4,207 votes, defeating Ghulam Hussain, a candidate of Pakistan People's Party (PPP), who received 3,764 votes.

=== 2015 ===
Ghulam Hussain of PML(N) won this seat again by getting 6,657 votes.

2015: Ghanche-II
Party	Candidate	Votes	%
PML(N)	Ghulam Hussain	6,657	50.91
PTI	Amina Bibi Ansari	5,710	43.67
MQM	Zuhair Ahmad Khan	227	1.74
PPP	Shereen Fatima	182	1.39
PAT	Khadim Hussain	140	1.07
Independents		119	0.91
Turnout		13,035	55.98
PML(N) hold		Swing	

=== 2020 ===
Abdul Hameed, an Independent candidate, won this seat by getting 3,657 votes. He later joined Pakistan Tehreek-e-Insaf (PTI).

2020: Ghanche-II
Party	Candidate	Votes	%
Independent	Abdul Hameed	3,657	28.15
PTI	Amina Bibi Ansari	3,210	24.05
Independent	Asif Advocate	2,527	20.74
PPP	Ghulam Ali Haideri	2,182	17.03
Others	Others	2,320	18.71
Turnout		13,635	53.76
Independent gain from PML(N)		Swing	

=== 2026 ===
General elections were held on 7 June 2026. Anwar Ali, an independent candidate, won the election with 13,161 votes. He later joined Istehkam-e-Pakistan Party (IPP).

Election 2026: GBA-23 Ghanche-II
Party	Candidate	Votes	%	±%
Independent	Anwar Ali	13,161	67.20	
Independent	Abdul Hameed	4,148	21.18	
JI	Rehmatullah	991	5.06	
PTI	Abdur Rahim (Note: PTI members who contested in the general election ran as independent candidates aligned with the party because the Election Commission Gilgit-Baltistan prohibited the PTI election symbol.)	838	4.28	
PPP	Amina Bibi Ansari	342	1.75	
Independent	Mumtaz Ali	95	0.49	
Independent	Tahir Ali	11	0.06	
Valid ballots		19,586	100.00	
Rejected ballots		0	0.00	
Turnout		19,586	54.52	
Majority		9,013	46.02	
Registered electors		35,924		
Independent gain from Independent				
