= GBA-22 Ghanche-I =

Constituency for the Gilgit Baltistan Assembly

- Constituency for the Gilgit Baltistan Assembly
- District: Ghanche District
- Electorate: 24,721

Current constituency
- Created: 2009
- Party: Pakistan Muslim League (N)
- Member: Muhammad Ibrahim Sanai

GBA-22 Ghanche-I is a constituency of Gilgit Baltistan Assembly which is currently represented by Muhammad Ibrahim Sanai of Pakistan Muslim League (N).

== Members ==
Election	Member	Party	Votes received
2009	Muhammad Jaffer	Pakistan Peoples Party	3,772 votes
2015	Muhammad Ibrahim Sanai	Pakistan Muslim League (N)	11,382 votes
2020	Mushtaq Hussain	Pakistan Tehreek-e-Insaf (Note: Hussain was elected as an independent, but later joined PTI.)	5,360 votes
2026	Muhammad Ibrahim Sanai	Pakistan Muslim League (N)	10,136 votes

== Election results ==
=== 2009 ===
Muhammad Jaffer of PPP became member of assembly by getting 3,772 votes.

=== 2015 ===
Muhammad Ibrahim Sanai of PML-N won this seat by getting 11,382 votes.

2015: Ghanche-I
Party	Candidate	Votes	%
PML-N	Muhammad Ibrahim Sanai	11,382	85.95
PTI	Amina Bibi Ansari	1,860	14.05
Turnout		13,242	53.57
PML(N) gain from PPP		Swing	

=== 2020 ===
General elections were held on 15 November 2020. Mushtaq Hussain, an independent candidate, won the election with 6,051 votes. He later joined Pakistan Tehreek-e-Insaf (PTI).

=== 2026 ===
General elections were held on 7 June 2026. Muhammad Ibrahim Sanai, a candidate of PML(N), won the election with 10,136 votes.

Election 2026: GBA-22 Ghanche-I
Party	Candidate	Votes	%	±%
PML(N)	Muhammad Ibrahim Sanai	10,136	47.18	
PPP	Ashiq Hussain	9,498	44.21	
Independent	Ibrahim	1,060	4.93	
Independent	Shakoor Ali	777	3.62	
Others	Others (three candidates)	12	0.06	
Valid ballots		21,483	100.00	
Rejected ballots		0	0.00	
Turnout		21,483	58.41	
Majority		638	2.97	
Registered electors		36,778		
PML(N) gain from Independent				
