= GBA-5 Nagar-II =

Constituency for the Gilgit Baltistan Assembly

- Constituency for the Gilgit Baltistan Assembly
- District: Nagar District
- Electorate: 11,989

Current constituency
- Created: 2009
- Seats: Zulfiqar Ali Murad
- Party: Pakistan People's Party
- Created from: GBA-5 Hunza-Nagar-I

GBA-5 Nagar-II is a constituency of Gilgit Baltistan Assembly which is currently represented by Zulfiqar Ali Murad of Pakistan People's Party.

== History ==
Before 2015, the constituency was in the Hunza-Nagar District. In 2015, when Nagar was made a separate district, GBA-5 was made its constituency.

== Members ==
Election	Member	Party	Votes received
2009	Mirza Hussain	Pakistan Muslim League (Q)	1,890 votes
2015	Rizwan Ali	Majlis Wahdat-e-Muslimeen	2,141 votes
2020	Javed Ali Manwa	Pakistan Tehreek-e-Insaf (Note: Manwa was elected as an independent, but later joined PTI.)	2,570 votes
2026	Zulfiqar Ali Murad	Pakistan People's Party	2,780 votes

== Election results ==
=== 2009 ===
Mirza Hussain of PML(Q) became member of assembly by getting 1,890 votes.

2009 election
Party	Candidate	Votes	%	±%
PML(Q)	Mirza Hussain	1,890	35.60	
PPP	Zulfiqar Ali Murad	1,739	32.76	
Independent	Kalb Ali	794	14.96	
Independent	Prince Barkat Ali	390	07.35	
MQM	Abdul Karim	384	7.23	
Independent	Sajjad Hussian	111	2.09	
Majority		151	2.84	+2.84
Turnout		13,562	38.85	+38.85
PML(Q) win (new seat)				

=== 2015 ===
Rizwan Ali of Majlis-e-Wahdat-e-Muslimeen won this seat by getting 2,141 votes.

2015 election
Party	Candidate	Votes	%	±%
MWM	Doctor Rizwan Ali	2,141	29.03	
Independent	Prince Qasim Ali Khan	1,546	20.97	
PML-N	Haji Qalab Ali	1,376	18.66	
PPP	Zulfiqar Ali Murad	1,304	17.68	
PTI	Mirza Hussain	1,001	13.57	
ITP	Sheikh Mirza Ali	5	0.67	
APML	Muhammad Issa	1	0.01	
Majority		948	6.99	
Turnout		7,374	61.51	
MWM gain from PML(Q)		Swing		

=== 2020 ===
Javed Ali Manwa won his seat in the Gilgit Baltistan Assembly by securing 2,562 votes. He later joined Pakistan Tehreek-e-Insaf (PTI).

=== 2026 ===
General elections were held on 7 June 2026. Zulfiqar Ali Murad, a candidate of PPP, won the election with 2,780 votes.

Election 2026: GBA-5 Nagar-II
Party	Candidate	Votes	%	±%
PPP	Zulfiqar Ali Murad	2,780	25.50	
MWM	Riaz Akbar	2,562	23.50	
Independent	Jahangir Shah	2,359	21.64	
PML(N)	Javed Ali Manwa	1,987	18.22	
ITP	Prince Qasim Ali	572	5.25	
Independent	Safdar Hussain Manwa	494	4.53	
Others	Others (seventeen candidates)	149	1.37	
Valid ballots		10,903	97.23	
Rejected ballots		311	2.77	
Turnout		11,214	61.28	
Majority		218	2.00	
Registered electors		18,300		
PPP gain from Independent				
