= GBA-13 Astore-I =

Constituency for the Gilgit Baltistan Assembly

- Constituency for the Gilgit Baltistan Assembly
- District: Astore District
- Electorate: 33,378

Current constituency
- Created: 2009
- Party: Pakistan Muslim League (N)
- Member: Rana Farman Ali

GBA-13 Astore-I is a constituency of Gilgit Baltistan Assembly which is currently represented by Rana Farman Ali of Pakistan Muslim League (N) (PML(N)).

== Members ==
Election	Member	Party	Votes received
2009	Abdul Hameed Khan	Pakistan People's Party (Note: Hameed was elected as an independent, but later joined PPP.)	3,771 votes
2015	Rana Farman Ali	Pakistan Muslim League (N)	5,942 votes
2020	Khalid Khurshid	Pakistan Tehreek-e-Insaf	6,089 votes
2026	Rana Farman Ali	Pakistan Muslim League (N)	8,058 votes

== Election results ==
=== Election 2009 ===
Abdul Hameed Khan, an independent candidate, became a member of the assembly by getting 3,771 votes. He later joined PPP.

General election 2009: Astore-I
Party	Candidate	Votes	%
Independent	Abdul Hameed Khan	3,771	37.77
PML(N)	Rana Farman Ali	3,546	35.52
Independent	Khalid Khurshid	2,667	26.71
Turnout		9,984	
Independent win (new seat)			

=== Election 2015 ===
Rana Farman Ali of Pakistan Muslim League (N) won this seat by getting 5,942 votes.

General election 2015: Astore-I
Party	Candidate	Votes	%	±%
PML(N)	Rana Farman Ali	5,942	36.95	▲1.43
Independent	Khalid Khurshid	4,019	24.99	▼1.72
PPP	Abdul Hameed Khan	3,808	23.68	▼14.09
Independent	Ghulam Abbas	1,750	10.88	
MWM	Ghulam Akbar	453	2.82	▲2.82
PTI	Sanaullah	49	0.31	▲0.31
JUI (F)	Inayatullah Mir	4	0.03	▲0.03
Others	Others (four candidates)	56	0.35	
Turnout		16,081	58.06	
Registered electors		27,699		
PML(N) gain from Independent		Swing		

=== Election 2020 ===
Khalid Khurshid of the Pakistan Tehreek-e-Insaf (PTI) won this seat by receiving 6,089 votes.

General election 2020: Astore-I
Party	Candidate	Votes	%	±%
PTI	Khalid Khurshid	5,297	32.50	▲32.19
PML(N)	Rana Farman Ali	4,033	24.75	▼12.20
PPP	Abdul Hameed Khan	3,546	21.75	▼1.93
Independent	Ghulam Abbas	2,251	13.81	▲2.93
Others	Others (eight candidates)	1,172	7.19	
Turnout		16,298	48.83	▼9.23
Majority		1,264	7.76	
Registered electors		33,378		
PTI gain from PML(N)				

=== By-election 2023 ===
A by-election was held on 9 September 2023 due to the disqualification of Chief Minister Khalid Khurshid, the previously elected member from this constituency. Results had shown Khalid Khurshid's father, Muhammad Khursheed Khan of the PTI had won, receiving 6,664 votes.

By-election 2023: Astore-I
Party	Candidate	Votes	%	±%
PTI	Muhammad Khursheed Khan	6,664	37.66	▲5.16
PML(N)	Rana Farman Ali	5,414	30.60	▲5.85
PPP	Abdul Hameed Khan	4,458	25.20	▲3.45
Others	Others (eleven candidates)	1,177	6.65	
Turnout		17,976	53.86	▲5.03
Total valid votes		17,693	98.43	
Rejected ballots		283	1.57	
Majority		1,250	7.06	▼0.70
Registered electors		33,378		
PTI hold				

On 4 January 2024, the Election Commission of Gilgit-Baltistan declared the by-election null and void. The Chief Election Commissioner had remarked in his decision that the PTI and PML(N) candidates had violated the Election Act.

=== Election 2026 ===
General elections were held on 7 June 2026. Rana Farman Ali, a candidate of Pakistan Muslim League (N) (PML(N)), won the election with 8,058 votes.

Election 2026: GBA-13 Astore-I
Party	Candidate	Votes	%	±%
PML(N)	Rana Farman Ali	8,058	37.02	▲6.42
PTI	Shahida Khursheed (Note: PTI members who contested in the general election ran as independent candidates aligned with the party because the Election Commission Gilgit-Baltistan prohibited the PTI election symbol.)	7,256	33.33	▼4.33
PPP	Fahad Hanif Khan	6,185	28.41	▲3.21
Others	Others (ten candidates)	270	1.24	
Valid ballots		21,769	97.79	
Rejected ballots		491	2.21	
Turnout		22,260	50.53	▼6.33
Majority		802	3.68	
Registered electors		44,056		
PML(N) gain from PTI				
