= Muhammad Anwar (politician) =

Pakistani politician from Gilgit-Baltistan

- محمد انور

Member of the Gilgit Baltistan Assembly
- Incumbent
- Assumed office 25 November 2020
- Preceded by: Janbaz Khan
- Succeeded by: Imam Malik
- Constituency: GBA-16 (Diamer-II)

Personal details
- Party: PML(Q) (2026-present)
- Other political affiliations: PMLN (2020-2026)

Muhammad Anwar is a Pakistani politician who has been a member of the Gilgit Baltistan Assembly since November 2020.

== Political career ==
Anwar contested the 2020 Gilgit-Baltistan Assembly election on 15 November 2020 from GBA-16 (Diamer-II) on the ticket from Pakistan Muslim League (N). He won the election by the margin of 669 votes over the Independent runner up Attaullah. He garnered 6415 votes while Attaullah received 5746 votes.
