= GBA-16 Diamer-II =

Constituency for the Gilgit Baltistan Assembly

- Constituency for the Gilgit Baltistan Assembly
- District: Diamer District
- Electorate: 27,935

Current constituency
- Created: 2009
- Party: Pakistan People's Party
- Member: Attaullah Shah

GBA-16 Diamer-II is a constituency of Gilgit Baltistan Assembly which is currently represented by Imam Malik of Istehkam-e-Pakistan Party.

== Members ==
Election	Member	Party	Votes received
2009	Janbaz Khan	Pakistan Muslim League (N)	2,403 votes
2015	Janbaz Khan	Pakistan Muslim League (N)	3,327 votes
2020	Muhammad Anwar	Pakistan Muslim League (N)	4,813 votes
2026 (Note: Imam Malik was initially notified as the winner of the election and took oath as a member of the Assembly. However, on 11 September 2026, an election tribunal suspended his notification and ordered the counting of postal ballots in the constituency. After these ballots were counted, Attaullah Shah was notified as the winner of the election, defeating Malik by 13 votes.)	Imam Malik	Istehkam-e-Pakistan Party (Note: Imam Malik was elected as an independent, but later joined IPP.)	6,320 votes
2026	Attaullah Shah	Pakistan People's Party	6,618 votes

== Election results ==
=== 2009 ===
Janbaz Khan of Pakistan Muslim League (N) became member of assembly by getting 2,403 votes.

=== 2015 ===
Janbaz Khan of Pakistan Muslim League (N) won this seat again by getting 3,327 votes.

2015: Diamir-II
Party	Candidate	Votes	%
PML-N	Janbaz Khan	3,327	21.83
Independent	Abdul Aziz	3,109	20.40
Independent	Attaullah	2,918	19.15
PPP	Dilbar Khan	2,011	13.19
PTI	Atiqullah	1,486	9.75
Independents & others		2,387	15.67
Turnout		15,238	54.55
PML(N) hold		Swing	

=== 2020 ===
General elections were held on 15 November 2020. Muhammad Anwar, a candidate of PML(N), won the election 4,813 votes.

=== 2026 ===
General elections were held on 7 June 2026. Imam Malik, an independent candidate, was initially declared the victor with 6,320 votes. He later joined Istehkam-e-Pakistan Party (IPP). However, on 11 September 2026, after a petition filed by Attaullah Shah, the runner-up from Pakistan People's Party (PPP), an election tribunal suspended Malik's membership and ordered the returning officer to verify and count postal ballots. On 14 September, Shah was declared the winner with 6,618 votes, defeating Malik by a margin of 13 votes.

Election 2026: GBA-21 Ghizer-III
Party	Candidate	Votes	%	±%
PPP	Attaullah Shah	6,618	26.04	
Independent	Imam Malik	6,605	25.99	
PML(N)	Muhammad Anwar	6,161	24.25	
IPP	Atiqullah	5,633	22.17	
Others	Others (ten candidates)	393	1.55	
Valid ballots		25,410	98.87	
Rejected ballots		290	1.13	
Turnout		25,700	55.53	
Majority		13	0.05	
Registered electors		46,282		
PPP gain from PML(N)				
