= GBA-15 Diamer-I =

Constituency for the Gilgit Baltistan Assembly

- Constituency for the Gilgit Baltistan Assembly
- District: Diamer District
- Electorate: 26,789

Current constituency
- Created: 2009
- Party: Istehkam-e-Pakistan Party
- Member: Muhammad Dilpazir

GBA-15 Diamer-I is a constituency of Gilgit Baltistan Assembly which is currently represented by Muhammad Dilpazir of Istehkam-e-Pakistan Party.

== Members ==
| Election | Member | Party | Votes received |
|---|---|---|---|
| 2009 | Bashir Ahmed | Pakistan Muslim League (Q) | 2,356 votes |
| 2015 | Haji Shah Baig | Jamiat Ulema-e-Islam (F) | 3,713 votes |
| 2020 | Haji Shah Baig | Pakistan Tehreek-e-Insaf (Note: Baig was elected as an independent, but later joined PTI.) | 2,779 votes |
| 2026 | Muhammad Dilpazir | Istehkam-e-Pakistan Party (Note: Muhammad Dilpazir was elected as an independent, but later joined IPP.) | 6,033 votes |

== Election results ==
=== 2009 ===
Bashir Ahmed Pakistan Muslim League (Q) became member of assembly by getting 2,356 votes.

=== 2015 ===
Haji Shah Baig of Jamiat Ulema-e-Islam (F) won this seat by getting 3,713 votes.

2015: Diamir-I
| Party | Candidate | Votes | % |
|---|---|---|---|
| JUI-F | Haji Shah Baig | 3,713 | |
| PPP | Fida Ullah | 3,557 | |
| PTI | Noshad Alam | 3,534 | |
| PML-N | Ghandal Shah | 44,000 | |
| Independents | | | |
| Turnout | | | |
| JUI (F) gain from PML(Q) | | Swing | |

=== 2020 ===
General elections were held on 15 November 2020. Haji Shah Baig, an independent candidate, won the election with 2,685 votes. He later joined Pakistan Tehreek-e-Insaf (PTI).

=== 2026 ===
General elections were held on 7 June 2026. Muhammad Dilpazir, an independent candidate, won the election with 6,033 votes. He later joined Istehkam-e-Pakistan Party (IPP).

Election 2026: GBA-15 Diamer-I
| Party | Candidate | Votes | % | ±% |
|---|---|---|---|---|
| Independent | Muhammad Dilpazir | 6,033 | 20.56 | |
| JUI (F) | Wali ur Rehman | 4,639 | 15.81 | |
| PPP | Bashir Ahmed Khan | 4,110 | 14.01 | |
| Independent | Aurang Zeb | 3,793 | 12.93 | |
| IPP | Shah Baig | 3,353 | 11.43 | |
| PML(N) | Abdul Wajid | 3,271 | 11.15 | |
| PTI | Nowshad Alam (Note: PTI members who contested in the general election ran as independent candidates aligned with the party because the Election Commission Gilgit-Baltistan prohibited the PTI election symbol.) | 2,480 | 8.45 | |
| Independent | Ashiqullah | 902 | 3.07 | |
| PML(Q) | Noor ul Hubul Haq Ala | 637 | 2.17 | |
| Others | Others (eleven candidates) | 120 | 0.41 | |
| Valid ballots | | 29,338 | 99.26 | |
| Rejected ballots | | 219 | 0.74 | |
| Turnout | | 29,557 | 65.36 | |
| Majority | | 1,394 | 4.74 | |
| Registered electors | | 45,225 | | |
| Independent gain from Independent | | | | |
