= Hafiz Hafeezur Rehman =

Pakistani politician (born 1969)

Hafiz Hafeez ur Rehman
- حافظ حفیظ الرحمان
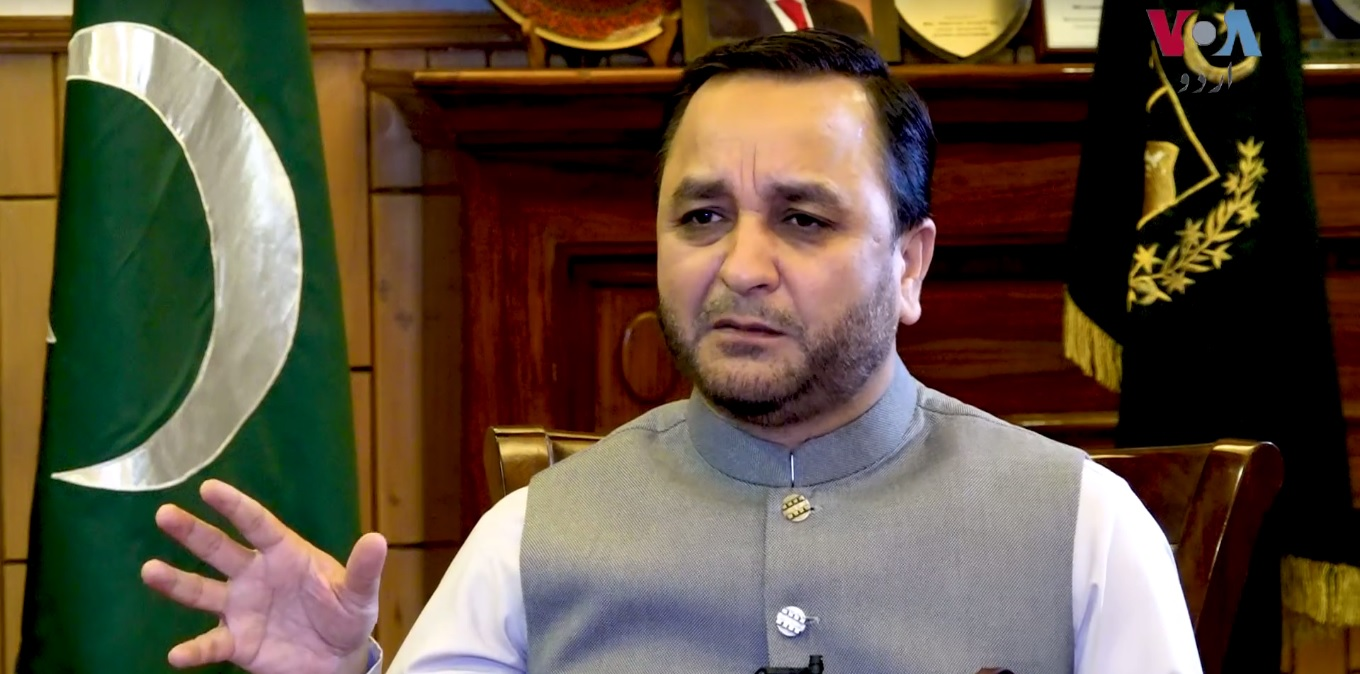
- Rehman as the Chief Minister

2nd Chief Minister of Gilgit-Baltistan
- In office 26 June 2015 – 23 June 2020
- Governor: Barjees Tahir; Mir Ghazanfar Ali Khan; Raja Jalal Hussain Maqpoon
- Preceded by: Sher Jehan Mir (caretaker)
- Succeeded by: Mir Afzal (caretaker)

Leader of the Opposition of the Gilgit-Baltistan Assembly
- Incumbent
- Assumed office 22 June 2026
- Preceded by: Muhammad Kazim Maisam

President of PMLN, Gilgit-Baltistan
- Incumbent
- Assumed office 6 February 2015
- President: Nawaz Sharif; Shehbaz Sharif; Nawaz Sharif

Member of the Gilgit-Baltistan Assembly
- Incumbent
- Assumed office 22 June 2026
- Preceded by: Jamil Ahmad
- Constituency: GBA-2 Gilgit-II
- In office 24 June 2015 – 23 June 2020
- Preceded by: Deedar Ali
- Succeeded by: Fatehullah Khan
- Constituency: GBA-2 Gilgit-II

Personal details
- Born: January 1969 Gilgit Gilgit-Baltistan, Pakistan
- Party: PMLN (2009-present)
- Profession: Politician

Hafiz Hafeezur Rehman (Urdu: حافظ حفیظ الرحمان) is a Pakistani politician who served as the 2nd Chief Minister of Gilgit-Baltistan, a territory in Northern Pakistan (de facto province) and also leader of Pakistan's conservative political party PML-N, in Gilgit-Baltistan. He served in office from 26 June 2015 to 23 June 2020. He also currently serves as the Leader of the Opposition, since 22 June 2026.

== Early life ==
Rehman was born in Kashtore neighbourhood of Gilgit, Northern Areas territory, where he received his early education in Gilgit City where he passed secondary school certification and then attended Jamia Farida madrassa in Lahore, Punjab, for religious education. His elder brother Saif Rehman had been like a political alma mater for him, who played the key role in establishing Pakistan Muslim League-N in Gilgit-Baltistan. In 2003, Saif Rehman who was serving as education, finance and revenue adviser in the then set-up, was assassinated in his hometown Kashrote near Gilgit city by his own close cousin.

== Political career ==
Rehman had his political training in an informal way. Before joining Pakistan Muslim League (N) (PML(N)), he had been attached with Jamiat Ulama-e-Islam (F) (JUI(F)). It was his brother's assassination that brought him into the formal political landscape of Gilgit-Baltistan.

He contested the 2009 Gilgit-Baltistan Assembly election from GBA-2 Gilgit-II as a candidate of PML(N), but was unsuccessful. He received 4,170 votes, placing third, and was defeated by Deedar Ali, an independent candidate.

He was elected to the Gilgit-Baltistan Assembly from GBA-2 Gilgit-II as a candidate of PML(N) in the 2015 Gilgit-Baltistan Assembly election. He received 10,739 votes and defeated Jamil Ahmad, a candidate of Pakistan People's Party (PPP).

On 26 June 2026, he was elected unopposed as the 2nd Chief Minister of Gilgit-Baltistan.

He contested the 2020 Gilgit-Baltistan Assembly election from GBA-2 Gilgit-II as a candidate of PML(N), but was unsuccessful. He received 5,723 votes, placing third, and was defeated by Fatehullah Khan, a candidate of Pakistan Tehreek-e-Insaf (PTI).

He was re-elected to the Gilgit-Baltistan Assembly from GBA-2 Gilgit-II as a candidate of PML(N) in the 2026 Gilgit Baltistan Assembly election. He received 14,788 votes and defeated Jamil Ahmed, a candidate of PPP.

He took oath as a member of the Assembly on 22 June 2026. He was appointed as the Leader of the Opposition on the same day.

== See also ==
- Politics of Pakistan
