= GBA-18 Diamer-IV =

Constituency for the Gilgit Baltistan Assembly

- Constituency for the Gilgit Baltistan Assembly
- District: Diamer District
- Electorate: 25,622

Current constituency
- Created: 2009
- Party: Pakistan Muslim League (N)
- Member: Malik Kifayatur Rehman

GBLA-18 Diamer-IV is a constituency of Gilgit Baltistan Assembly of the Darel District which is currently represented by Malik Kifayatur Rehman of Pakistan Muslim League (N).

== Members ==
Election	Member	Party	Votes received
2009	Gulbar Khan	Jamiat Ulema-e-Islam (F)	2,741 votes
2015	Muhammad Wakeel	Pakistan Muslim League (N)	3,527 votes
2016	Imran Wakeel	Pakistan Muslim League (N)	3,914 votes
2020	Gulbar Khan	Pakistan Tehreek-e-Insaf	4,401 votes
2026	Malik Kifayatur Rehman	Pakistan Muslim League (N)	6,081 votes

== Election results ==
=== 2009 ===
Gulbar Khan of JUI-F became member of assembly in 2009 elections.

=== 2015 ===
Muhammad Wakeel of Pakistan Muslim League (N) (PML(N)) won this seat by getting 3,622 votes.

2015: Diamir-IV
Party	Candidate	Votes	%
PML-N	Muhammad Wakeel	3,761	52.04
JUI F	Gulbar Khan	2,438	33.74
PPP	Shakrat Khan	828	11.46
PTI	Dilbar Khan	88	1.22
Independents & Others		112	1.55
Turnout		7,227	46.03
PML(N) gain from JUI (F)		Swing	

=== 2016 ===
In May 2016 Muhammad Wakeel died of cardiac arrest. Imran Wakeel, a candidate of PML(N), was elected on 12 July 2016 By-polls by securing 3,917 votes.

=== 2020 ===
General elections were held on 15 November 2020. Gulbar Khan, a candidate of Pakistan Tehreek-e-Insaf (PTI), won the election with 4,059 votes.

=== 2026 ===
General elections were held on 7 June 2026. Malik Kifayatur Rehman, a candidate of PML(N), was elected with 6,081 votes.

Election 2026: GBA-18 Diamer-IV
Party	Candidate	Votes	%	±%
PML(N)	Malik Kifayatur Rehman	6,081	48.25	
IPP	Gulbar Khan	5,447	43.22	
JUI (F)	Abdur Rasheed	581	4.61	
PTI	Muhammad Ayub (Note: PTI members who contested in the general election ran as independent candidates aligned with the party because the Election Commission Gilgit-Baltistan prohibited the PTI election symbol.)	424	3.36	
Others	Others (six candidates)	70	0.56	
Valid ballots		12,603	99.41	
Rejected ballots		75	0.59	
Turnout		12,678	46.32	
Majority		634	5.03	
Registered electors		27,368		
PML(N) gain from PTI				
