= GBA-1 Gilgit-I =

Constituency for the Gilgit Baltistan Assembly

- Constituency for the Gilgit Baltistan Assembly
- District: Gilgit District
- Electorate: 45,792

Current constituency
- Created: 2009
- Party: Pakistan People's Party
- Member: Amjad Hussain Azar

GBA-1 Gilgit-I is a constituency of Gilgit Baltistan Assembly which is currently represented by the Amjad Hussain Azar of Pakistan Peoples Party who is the current Chief Minister of Gilgit-Baltistan.

== Members of Assembly ==
Election	Member	Party	Votes received
2009	Syed Raziuddin Rizvi	Pakistan People's Party (Note: Rizvi was elected as an independent, but later joined PPP.)	10,012 votes
2015	Jafarullah Khan	Pakistan Muslim League (N)	7,171 votes
2020	Amjad Hussain Azar	Pakistan Peoples Party	11,178 votes
2026	Amjad Hussain Azar	Pakistan Peoples Party	11,287 votes

== Election 2009 ==
Syed Raziuddin Rizvi an independent politician became member of assembly by getting 10012 votes. He later joined Pakistan People's Party (PPP).

== Election 2015 ==
Jafarullah Khan of Pakistan Muslim League (N) won by getting 7171 votes and became Deputy Speaker of the Assembly.

2015 election
Party	Candidate	Votes	%	±%
Pakistan Muslim League (N)	Jafarullah Khan	7,171	36.39	
Pakistan Peoples Party	Amjad Hussain Azar	6,297	31.96	
Independent	Syed Nizam Ud Din Shah	2,285	11.59	
Majlis-e-Wahdat-e-Muslimeen	Muhammad Ilyas Siddiqui	2,109	10.70	
Majority		874	4.43	
Turnout		19,703	64.48	
PML(N) gain from PPP		Swing		

== Election 2020 ==
Amjad Hussain Azar won by 11178 votes and became the opposition leader.

Party	Candidate	Votes
Pakistan Peoples Party	Amjad Hussain Azar	11178
Independent	Maulana Sultan Rais	8356
Pakistan Tehreek-e-Insaf	Johar Ali	2000
Pakistan Muslim League (N)	Jafarullah Khan	85

== Election 2026 ==
A general election was held on 7 June 2026. Amjad Hussain Azar won the election with 11,287 votes.

Election 2026: GBA-1 Giglit-I
Party	Candidate	Votes	%	±%
PPP	Amjad Hussain Azar	11,287	37.89	
PML(N)	Muhammad Shafiq Ud Din	6,472	21.73	
MWM	Muhammad Ilyas Saddiqi	3,655	12.27	
Independent	Asif Khan	2,694	9.04	
PRHP	Himayat Ullah Khan	2,290	7.69	
Independent	Jarrar Hussain	1,535	5.15	
IPP	Sultan Rais	988	3.32	
Others	Others (sixteen candidates)	866	2.91	
Valid ballots		29,787	96.95	
Rejected ballots		936	3.05	
Turnout		30,723	67.09	
Majority		4,815	16.16	
Registered electors		45,792		
PPP hold				
