= 2020 Gilgit-Baltistan Assembly election =

Elections in Pakistani-administered area

2020 Gilgit-Baltistan Assembly Election
- November 15, 2020 (Note: Except the election in the General Constituency of GBA-3 (Gilgit-III), where the election was postponed due to the death of a major candidate and was held on November 22.)

All 33 seats in the Gilgit-Baltistan Legislative Assembly 17 seats needed for a majority
- Registered: 745,362
- Turnout: 48.12%

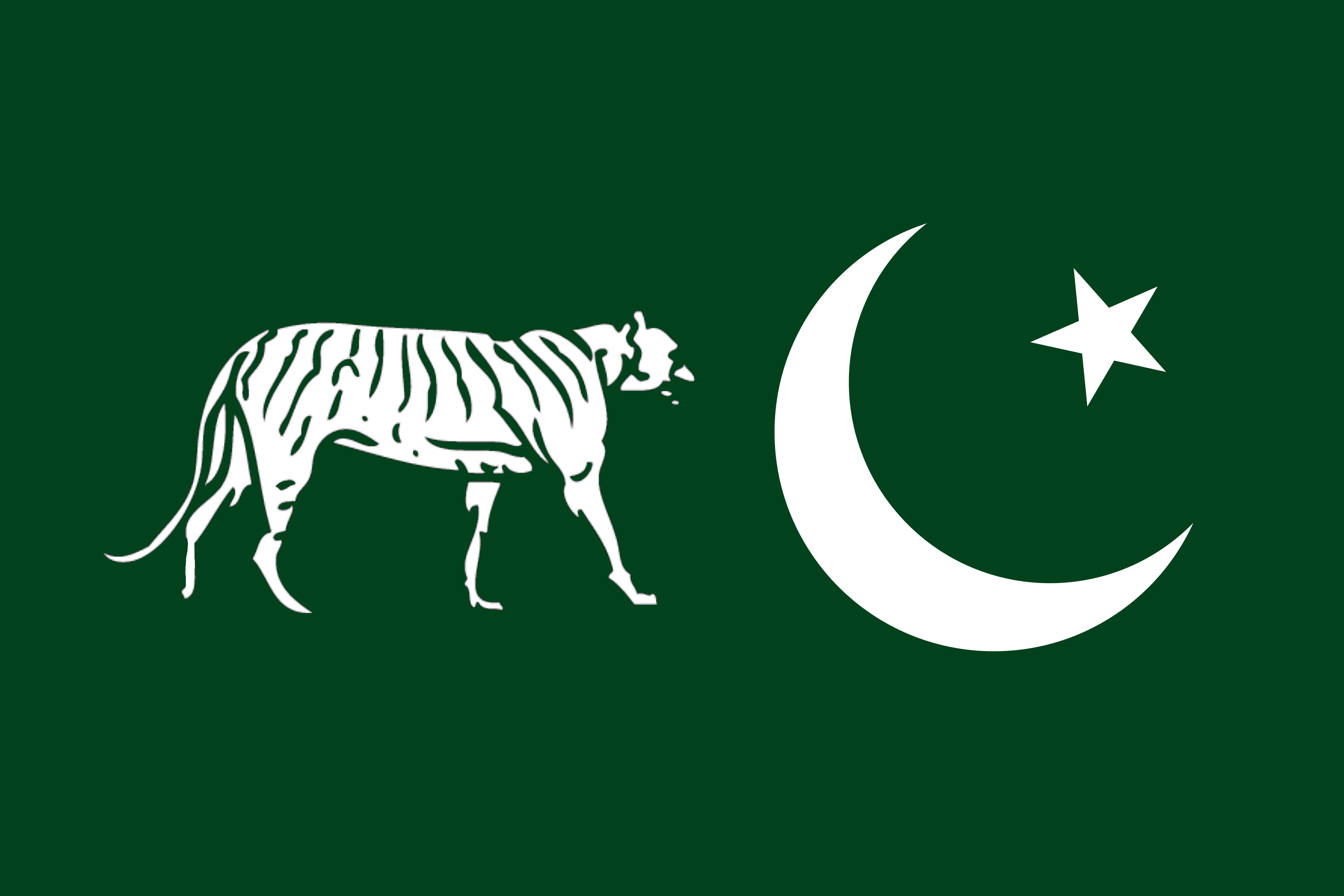
	First party	Second party	Third party
Leader	'Khalid Khurshid’	Amjad Hussain Azar	Hafiz Hafeezur Rehman
Party	PTI	PPP	PML(N)
Leader's seat	Astore-I (won)	Gilgit-I (won); Nagar-I (won)	Gilgit-II (lost)
Last election	1 seat, 11.11%	1 seat, 18.26%	21 seats, 34.17%
Seats won	22 (Note: Six MLAs were elected as independents, but joined PTI after the election.)	5	3
Seat change	▲21	▲4	▼18
Popular vote	-	-	-
Percentage	-	-	-
Swing	-	-	-
- Gilgit Baltistan Assembly Constituencies and winning parties
Chief Minister before election
Hafiz Hafeezur Rehman
PML(N)
Elected Chief Minister
Khalid Khurshid
PTI

The 2020 Gilgit-Baltistan Assembly elections were held on 15 November 2020. Elections were held in 24 constituencies, each electing one member to the 3rd Gilgit-Baltistan Legislative Assembly. 330 candidates contested these elections, either representing one of the political parties of Gilgit-Baltistan (at the time of the 2020 elections) or being an independent candidate.

The elections were originally scheduled to be held on 18 August 2020, but were postponed in July due to the COVID-19 pandemic, which severely affected Gilgit-Baltistan.

The Pakistan Army was not called in to preside over the polls at the Election, with Mir Afzal, the Caretaker Chief Minister of Gilgit-Baltistan, giving a statement that the caretaker government had the capacity to hold free, fair, and transparent elections in Gilgit-Baltistan.

Opinion polling taken before the election had shown the Pakistan Muslim League (Nawaz), the ruling party prior to the 2020 election, being the third-most-popular political party in Gilgit-Baltistan, falling from its earlier position of making the province's government and having the largest vote-bank. The Pakistan Tehreek-e-Insaf, which ruled nationally, led in the polls and the Pakistan Peoples Party had been shown as the second-most-popular political party.

745,362 voters in Gilgit-Baltistan had the ability to exercise their right to vote in the elections and will be able to vote across nearly 1,234 polling places across the province. This showed an increase of 126,998 new voters since 2015, when only 618,364 people were registered to vote. 405,365 of the people registered to vote are male and 339,997 are female (which shows a gender gap of 9%).

The elections were postponed in the constituency GBA-3 (Gilgit-III), due to the PTI candidate in that constituency, who was the provincial party leader, dying of COVID-19 in early October. The election there were held on November 22, seven days after the election throughout the rest of Gilgit-Baltistan.

Preliminary and unofficial results showed the Pakistan Tehreek-e-Insaf being all set to form the next government in Gilgit-Baltistan. They had won eleven general seats, Independent politicians had won seven seats, the Pakistan Peoples Party had won three seats, the Pakistan Muslim League (Nawaz) had won two seats, and the Majlis Wahdat-e-Muslimeen had won one seat.

In late November 2020, the final results revealed that the PTI won a two-thirds majority of seats (22 of 33). The PPP and PML-N won five and three seats, respectively.

Full results by districts were published on November 24. The latter two parties made claims of election fraud and supporters staged demonstrations to protest against the alleged rigging.

== Background ==
=== 2015 elections ===
Following the elections in 2015, Pakistan Muslim League (N), emerged as the largest party winning 15 of the 24 general seats in the Gilgit-Baltistan Assembly, and securing a supermajority in the assembly after the three technocrat (two who went to PML(N)) and six women representatives (four who went to PML(N)) were added with a final total of 21 out of 33 seats. Hafiz Hafeezur Rehman was elected as the Chief Minister of Gilgit-Baltistan.

== Timeline ==
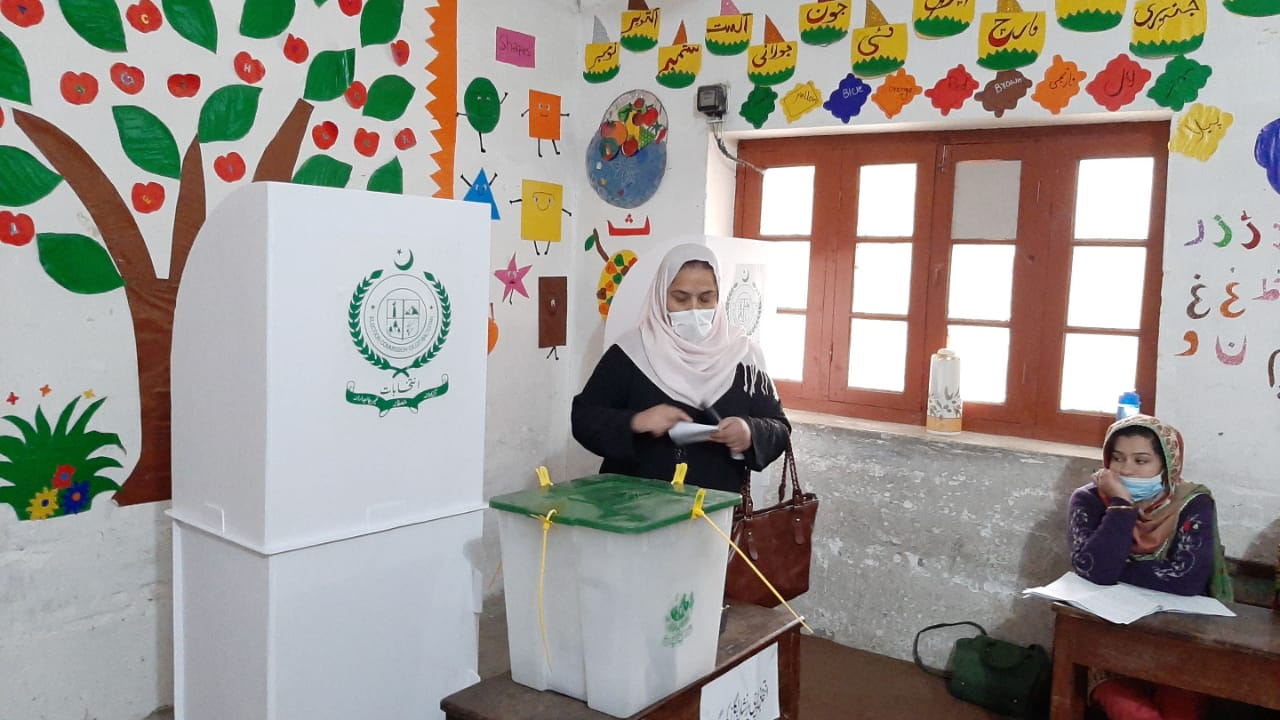
Woman casting her vote during the election

- April 30, 2020: The Supreme Court of Pakistan allows the federal government to form a caretaker government in late June 2020 and hold a general election in Gilgit-Baltistan less than sixty days after the formation of the caretaker government.
- June 24, 2020: The members of the second assembly of Gilgit-Baltistan complete their full five-year terms and the assembly is dissolved. Mir Afzal is sworn in as the Chief Minister of Gilgit-Baltistan, serving as a caretaker.
- June 27, 2020: The President of Pakistan, Dr. Arif Alvi releases a statement scheduling the date August 18, 2020 to be the date of polling in the 2020 Gilgit-Baltistan Assembly election.
- July 2, 2020: An election schedule is issued by the Gilgit-Baltistan Election Commission confirming August 18, 2020 to be the date of polling.
- July 11, 2020: The Gilgit-Baltistan Election Commission postpones the upcoming election and suspends the previously published schedule in light of the COVID-19 pandemic. New dates of polling in October 2020 are deliberated upon.
- September 23, 2020: The President of Pakistan, Dr. Arif Alvi gives approval to the proposed polling date of November 15, 2020 for the 2020 Gilgit-Baltistan Assembly election.
- September 24, 2020: A detailed election schedule is issued by the Gilgit-Baltistan Election Commission confirming the new date of polling, November 15, 2020.
- October 3, 2020: The Caretaker Chief Minister of Gilgit-Baltistan Mir Afzal states that the Pakistan military's help will not be required in holding free and fair elections throughout Gilgit-Baltistan.
- October 19, 2020: The final revised list of the candidates running in each constituency is published by the Election Commission of Gilgit-Baltistan.
- October 20, 2020: Election Symbols are allotted to political parties and candidates.
- November 13, 2020: Official electoral rolls and lists of polling stations are released.
- November 15, 2020: Elections held in all general seats of Gilgit-Baltistan except GBA-3 (Gilgit-III).
- November 22, 2020: Election held in GBA-3 (Gilgit-III).
- November 24, 2020: Final results are revealed.

== Parties ==
The table below lists the ten political parties that fielded at least three candidates (out of a possible 24 constituencies) or won at least one assembly seat in the 2020 Gilgit-Baltistan Assembly election, and gives a detailed overview of their characteristics. Parties are initially ordered by their voteshare in the 2015 Gilgit-Baltistan Assembly Election.

Name		National Leader	Claimed Ideology(ies)	Voteshare in 2015	General Assembly Seats won in the 2015 election	Total seats in the 2nd Gilgit-Baltistan Assembly (Note: One member was an independent politician)	Total seats in the 3rd Gilgit-Baltistan Assembly (Note: One member was an independent politician)	Symbol
PML(N)	Pakistan Muslim League (Nawaz) پاکستان مسلم لیگ (نواز)	Shehbaz Sharif	Conservatism; Economic liberalism Federalism	34.17%	15 / 24	21 / 33	3 / 33	Tiger
PPP	Pakistan Peoples Party پاکستان پیپلز پارٹی	Bilawal Bhutto; Zardari	Social Democracy; Secularism; Social liberalism	18.26%	1 / 24	1 / 33	5 / 33	Arrow
PTI	Pakistan Tehreek-e-Insaf پاکستان تحريکِ انصاف	Imran Khan	Populism; Islamic Democracy; Welfarism	11.11%	1 / 24	1 / 33	22 / 33	Bat
MWM	Majlis Wahdat-e-Muslimeen مجلس وحدتِ مسلمین	Allama Raja; Nasir Abbas	Pan-Islamism; Welfarism; Populism	10.50%	2 / 24	3 / 33	1 / 33	Tent
ITP	Islami Tehreek Pakistan اسلامی تحریک پاکستان	Syed Sajid; Ali Naqvi	Shia Islamism	4.88%	2 / 24	3 / 33	0 / 33	Two Swords
JUI(F)	Jamiat Ulema-e-Islam (Fazl) جمیعت علمائے اسلام (فضل)	Fazl-ur-Rahman	Islamism; Clericalism; Conservatism	2.94%	1 / 24	3 / 33	1 / 33	Book
BNF (Note: Represented by Nawaz Khan Naji. Although Naji is the leader of Balawaristan National Front (Naji), he ran as an independent in the elections.)	Balawaristan National Front (Naji) بلاورستان نيشنل فرنٹ (ناجی)	Nawaz Khan Naji	Gilgit-Baltistan; Autonomy	1.39%	1 / 24	1 / 33	1 / 33	Revolver
APML	All Pakistan Muslim League آل پاکستان مسلم لیگ	Pervez Musharraf	Pakistani Nationalism; Islamic Democracy; Atlanticism	1.18%	0 / 24	0 / 33	0 / 33	Eagle
MQM(P)	Muttahida Qaumi Movement (Pakistan) (متحدہ قومی موومنٹ (پاکستان	Khalid Maqbool Siddiqui	Liberalism; Muhajir Nationalism; Secularism	0.16%	0 / 24	0 / 33	0 / 33	Kite
PSP	Pak Sarzameen Party پاک سرزمین پارٹی	Syed Mustafa; Kamal	Pakistani Nationalism	Did Not Contest 2015 Elections			0 / 33	Dolphin
PML(Q)	Pakistan Muslim League (Quaid e Azam) پاکستان مسلم لیگ (قائد اعظم)	Shujaat Hussain	Conservatism; Pakistani Nationalism	Did Not Contest 2015 Elections			0 / 33	Tractor

== Opinion Polls ==
In the run up to the 2020 Gilgit-Baltistan elections, various organisations have carried out opinion polling to gauge voting intention throughout Gilgit-Baltistan. The results of such polls are displayed in this section. The date range for these opinion polls are from the previous general election, held on 8 June 2015, to the present day.

=== Voting Intention ===
The table below shows the results of polls taken which asked the people of Gilgit-Baltistan which political party they would vote for in the 2020 election.

Polling firm	Last date of polling	Link	PML(N)	PPP	PTI	JUI(F)	Indep.	Other	Lead	Margin of error	Sample size	Polling method
Pulse Consultant	8 November 2020	HTML	14%	26%	35%	4%	12%	9%	+9%	N/A	1,423	Field Interviews
Gallup Pakistan	6 November 2020	HTML	14%	24%	27%	4%	12%	19%	+3%	±2-3%	~1,000	Unknown
2015 Election	8 June 2015	ECGB	34.17%	18.40%	11.11%	4.45%	31.87%		+15.77%	N/A	379,032	Final Election Results

== Results ==
The two tables below show the results of the 2020 Gilgit-Baltistan Assembly Election by Political Party. The first table shows the results for the elections provincewide, through all 24 constituencies, and shows each political party's standing. The second table shows more detailed results for each of the 24 general constituencies.

On November 24, 2020, full results were published on the official Pakistani elections sites. PTI received 10 additional seats, earning it a historic two-thirds majority in the Assembly. Independent candidates won 7 seats; Six of the independent candidates joined PTI after the election and the party already had a seat adjustment arrangement with the MWM. PPP got one seat reserved for women and one seat reserved for technocrats, whereas PMLN only got one reserved seat for women. The PPP party refused to accept the results and claimed election fraud.

=== Provincewide ===
Party	Votes	%	Seats				
Party	Votes	%	General	Women	Technocrats	Total	+/–
PTI			16	4	2	22	+21
PPP			3	1	1	5	+4
PMLN			2	1	0	3	–18
MWM			1	0	0	1	–2
AML			0	0	0	0	0
ITP			0	0	0	0	–4
JUI (F)			1	0	0	1	0
MQM-P			0	0	0	0	New
PML(Q)			0	0	0	0	New
PSP			0	0	0	0	New
BNF			1	0	0	1	0
TLP			0	0	0	0	New
Total			24	6	3	33	0
Registered voters/turnout	745,362	–					

=== By Constituency ===
Constituency		Winner				Runner-up				Margin	Registered Voters	Votes Cast	Voter Turnout
District	Name	Candidate	Party	Votes	%	Candidate	Party	Votes	%	Margin	Registered Voters	Votes Cast	Voter Turnout
Gilgit	GBA-1	Amjad Hussain Azar	PPP	11,178		Sultan Rais	IND	8,356		2,822	35,992		
Gilgit	GBA-2	Fatehullah Khan	PTI	6,698	27.16%	Jamil Ahmad	PPP	6,694	27.14%	4	41,108	24,661	60.00%
Gilgit	GBA-3	Syed Sohail Abbas Shah	PTI	6,873		Muhammad Iqbal	IND	4,678		2,195	41,360	26,461	63.98%
Nagar	GBA-4	Amjad Hussain Azar	PPP	4,716		Muhammad Ayub Waziri	ITP	4,291		425	23,171	14,837	64.03%
Nagar	GBA-5	Javed Ali Manwa	IND	2,570		Rizwan Ali	MWM	1,850		720	14,001		
Hunza	GBA-6	Abaid Ullah Baig	PTI	5,710		Noor Muhammad	IND	4,683		2,014	43,603	23,060	52.89%
Skardu	GBA-7	Raja Muhammad Zakaria Khan Maqpoon	PTI	5,565		Syed Mehdi Shah	PPP	4,113		1,452	17,127		
Skardu	GBA-8	Muhammad Kazim Maisam	MWM	7,842	35.35%	Syed Muhammad Ali Shah	PPP	6,904	31.12%	938	39,567	22,182	56.06%
Skardu	GBA-9	Wazir Muhammad Saleem	IND	6,286		Fida Muhammad Nashad	PTI	5,187		1,099	25,562		
Skardu	GBA-10	Raja Nasir Ali Khan Maqpoon	IND	4,811	27.18%	Wazir Hassan	PTI	3,439	19.43%	1,372	26,839	17,702	65.96%
Kharmang	GBA-11	Syed Amjad Ali Zaidi	PTI	5,733		Syed Muhsin Rizvi	IND	2,016		3,717	26,869		
Shigar	GBA-12	Raja Azam Khan Amacha	PTI	10,674		Imran Nadeem	PPP	8,886		1,788	36,183	24,804	68.55%
Astore	GBA-13	Muhammad Khalid Khurshid Khan	PTI	4,836		Abdul Hamid Khan	PPP	3,117		1,719	33,378	16,298	48.83%
Astore	GBA-14	Shamsul Haq	PTI	5,354		Muzaffar Ali	PPP	3,473		1,881	29,023	15,513	53.45%
Diamer	GBA-15	Shah Baig	IND	2,713		Muhammad Dilpazir Khan	IND	2,309		404	35,185	22,237	63.20%
Diamer	GBA-16	Muhammad Anwar	PML(N)	4,813		Attaullah	IND	2,576		2,237	35,405	21,458	60.61%
Diamer	GBA-17	Rehmat Khaliq	JUI(F)	5,389		Haider Khan	PTI	5,126		263	29,955	12,870	42.96%
Diamer	GBA-18	Gulbar Khan	PTI	6,793		Malik Kifayatur Rehman	IND	5,986		807	18,907	9,669	51.14%
Ghizer	GBA-19	Nawaz Khan Naji	BNF(N)	6,208		Syed Jalal Ali Shah	PPP	4,967		1,241	37,808		
Ghizer	GBA-20	Nazir Ahmed	PTI	5,592		Khan Akbar Khan	PML(Q)	3,815		1,777	42,533		
Ghizer	GBA-21	Ghulam Muhammad	PML(N)	4,334		Muhammad Ayub Shah	PPP	3,430		904	34,973	20,053	57.34%
Ghanche	GBA-22	Mushtaq Hussain	IND	6,051		Muhammad Ibrahim Sanai	PTI	4,945		1,106	29,104	17,169	58.99%
Ghanche	GBA-23	Abdul Hameed	IND	3,666		Amina Ansari	PTI	3,296		370	27,522	15,393	55.93%
Ghanche	GBA-24	Engr Mohammad Ismail	PPP	6,239		Syed Shamsuddin	PTI	5,361		845	20,187	12,251	60.69%
