= 2009 Gilgit-Baltistan Assembly election =

Election in Gilgit-Baltistan

- 12 November 2009

All 33 seats in the Gilgit-Baltistan Legislative Assembly 17 seats needed for a majority
- Turnout: 60.70%

	First party	Second party	Third party
Leader	Syed Mehdi Shah	Rehmat Khaliq	Bashir Ahmad
Party	PPP	JUI (F)	PML(Q)
Leader's seat	Skardu-I(won)	Diamer-IV (won)	Diamer-I (won)
Seats won	18	4	3
Popular vote	72,851	-	-
Percentage	33.08%	15.26%	9.97%
- Map of Gilgit-Baltistan showing Assembly Constituencies and winning parties
Deputy Chief Executive before election
Mir Ghazanfar Ali Khan
PML(Q)
Elected Chief Minister
Syed Mehdi Shah
PPP

Elections were held on 12 November 2009 in Gilgit-Baltistan to elect the first Gilgit-Baltistan Assembly.

== Background ==
The region of Gilgit-Baltistan was formerly known as Northern Areas. The Northern Areas were formed by joining Gilgit Agency and Baltistan regions in 1970 but the Northern Areas were ruled directly from Islamabad. In 2009 the Government of Pakistan passed an Autonomy Order known as Gilgit-Baltistan Empowerment and Self-governance Order, 2009 which was signed by the President of Pakistan Asif Ali Zardari in September 2009.

== Parties and candidates ==
264 candidates out of which 99 from 10 different political parties and 165 independent candidates contested for 24 seats across Gilgit-Baltistan.

Party	Seats Contested
PPP	23
MQM-L	20
PML-N	15
PML-Q	14
GBDA	10
JUI-F	6
BNF	4
ANP	3
JI	2
PTI	2
IND	165

== Campaign and polling ==
Voting took place on 12 November 2009 on Morning 9 AM to 4 PM without any break. 1022 polling stations were set up across Gilgit-Baltistan out of which 200 polling stations were considered sensitive. 5000 law enforcement personnel was hired for security.

== Result ==
The two tables below show the results of the elections. The first table shows the results for the elections across all 24 constituencies, and shows each political party's standing after independents joining different parties and the allotment of reserved seats. The second table shows the winner of each of the 24 constituencies, 6 reserved seats for women, and 3 reserved seats for technocrats.

Party	Seats				
Party	General	Women	Technocrats	Independents joined	Total
PPP	12	4	2	3	21
JUI(F)	2	1	1	0	4
PML(Q)	2	1	0	0	3
PML(N)	2	0	0	0	2
MQM	1	0	0	1	1
ITP	0	0	0	1	1
IND	4	0	0	-4	0
Total seats	23 (Note: The Assembly contains 24 general seats, but elections were postponed on GBA-19 Ghizer-I.)	6	3	0	32

=== By constituency ===
Constituency		Winner		Source
District	Name	Candidate	Party	Source
Gilgit	GBA-1	Raziuddin Rizvi	IND (Note: Raziuddin Rizvi was elected as an independent, but later joined PPP.)	
Gilgit	GBA-2	Deedar Ali	IND (Note: Deedar Ali was elected as an independent, but later joined Islami Tehreek Pakistan (ITP).)	
Gilgit	GBA-3	Aftab Haider	PPP	
Gilgit	GBA-4	Muhammad Ali Akhtar	PPP	
Gilgit	GBA-5	Mirza Hussain	PML(Q)	
Gilgit	GBA-6	Wazir Baig	PPP	
Skardu	GBA-7	Syed Mehdi Shah	PPP	
Skardu	GBA-8	Sheikh Nisar Hussain Sarbaz	PPP	
Skardu	GBA-9	Wazir Shakeel Ahmed	PPP	
Skardu	GBA-10	Wazir Hassan	PPP	
Skardu	GBA-11	Syed Mohammad Ali Shah	PPP	
Skardu	GBA-12	Raja Azam Khan Amacha	MQM	
Astore	GBA-13	Abdul Hameed Khan	IND (Note: Abdul Hameed Khan was elected as an independent, but later joined PPP.)	
Astore	GBA-14	Mohammad Naseer	PPP	
Diamer	GBA-15	Bashir Ahmed	PML(Q)	
Diamer	GBA-16	Janbaz Khan	PML(N)	
Diamer	GBA-17	Rehmat Khaliq	JUI(F)	
Diamer	GBA-18	Gulbar Khan	JUI(F)	
Ghizer	GBA-19	Elections postponed due to death of MQM candidate		
Ghizer	GBA-20	Ali Madad Sher	PPP	
Ghizer	GBA-21	Muhammad Ayub Shah	IND (Note: Muhammad Ayub Shah was elected as an independent, but later joined PPP.)	
Ghanche	GBA-22	Mohammad Jaffer	PPP	
Ghanche	GBA-23	Maulana Mohammad Abdullah	PML(N)	
Ghanche	GBA-24	Mohammad Ismail	PPP	
Reserved seats for women		Sadia Danish	PPP	
Reserved seats for women		Gul Meera	PPP	
Reserved seats for women		Shireen Fatima	PPP	
Reserved seats for women		Yasmin Nazar	PPP	
Reserved seats for women		Mehnaz Wali	JUI(F)	
Reserved seats for women		Amina Ansari	PML(Q)	
Reserved seats for technocrats		Mutabiat Shah	PPP	
Reserved seats for technocrats		Jamil Ahmad	PPP	
Reserved seats for technocrats		Maulana Sarwar Shah	JUI(F)	

== Aftermath ==
The assembly members took oath on 10 December 2009 and Syed Mehdi Shah of PPP became the 1st Chief Minister of Gilgit-Baltistan unopposed. Moreover, Wazir Baig and Jamil Ahmad, both of PPP, were elected as Speaker and Deputy Speaker, respectively.
