= 2015 Gilgit-Baltistan Assembly election =

Pakistani territorial election

2015 Gilgit-Baltistan Assembly Election
- June 8, 2015

All 33 seats in the Gilgit-Baltistan Assembly 17 seats needed for a majority
- Registered: 618,364
- Turnout: 61.29%
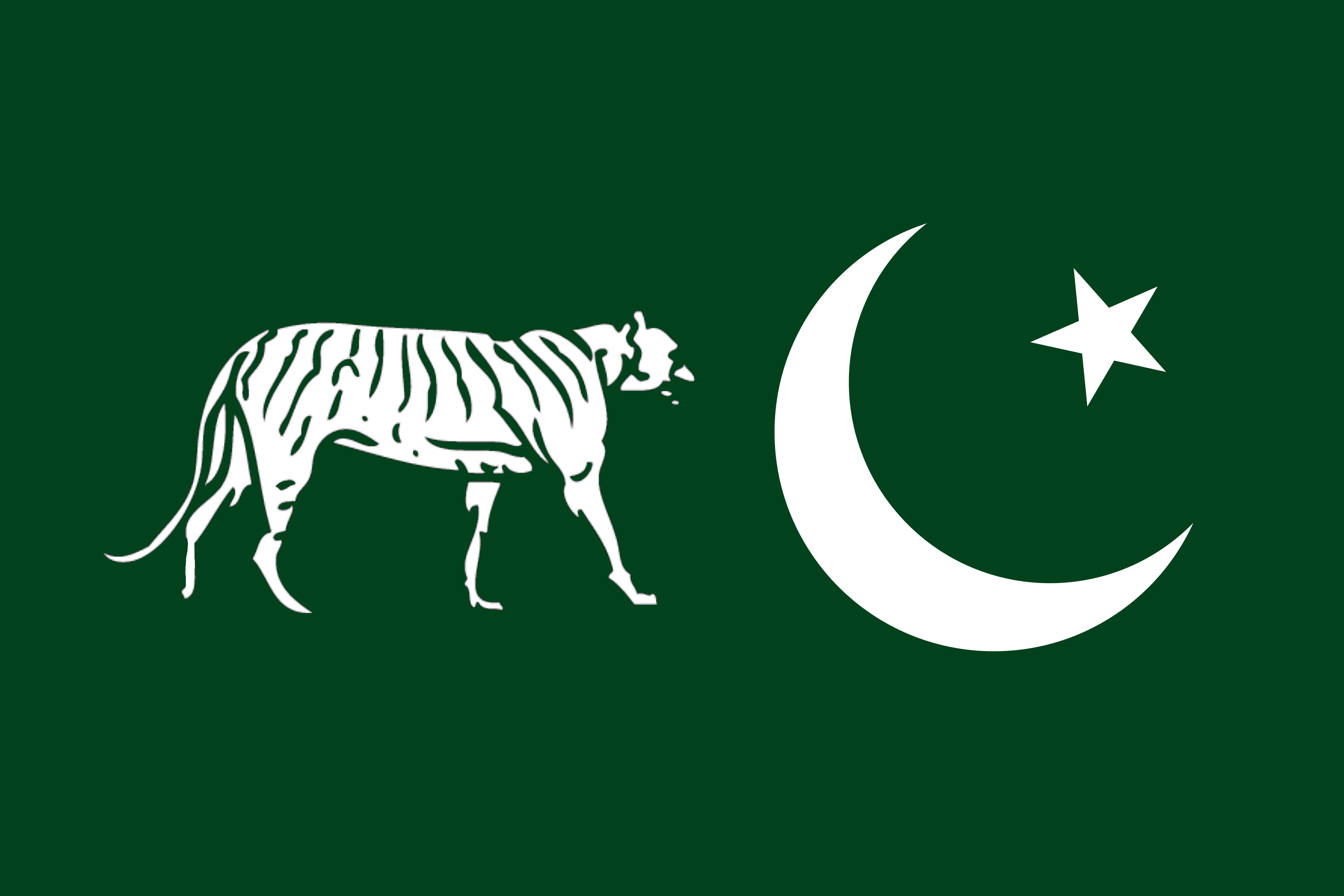

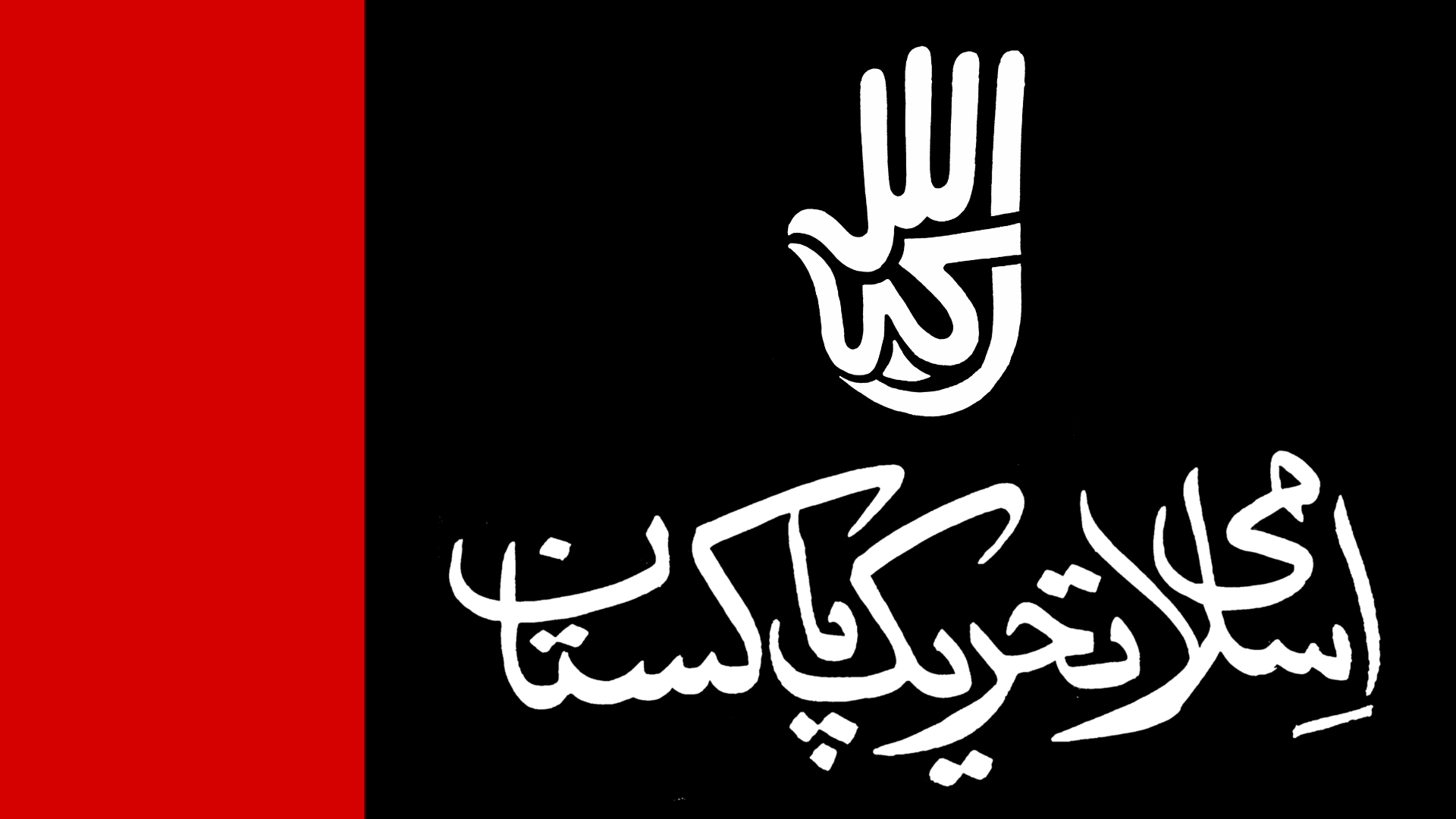

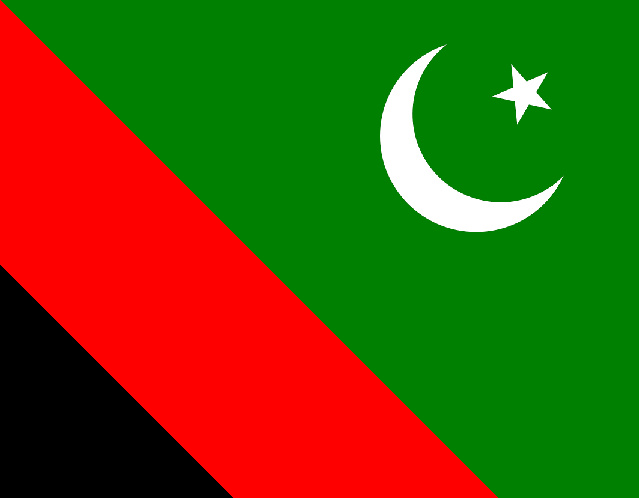

| | First party | Second party | Third party |
|---|---|---|---|
| Leader | Hafiz Hafeezur Rehman | Syed Ahmed Iqbal Rizvi | Syed Sajid Ali Naqvi |
| Party | PML(N) | ITP | MWM |
| Leader's seat | Gilgit-II (won) | Did not contest | Did not contest |
| Last election | 2 seats | 0 seats | 0 seats |
| Seats won | 21 | 4 | 3 |
| Seat change | ▲19 | ▲4 | ▲3 |
| Popular vote | 129,526 | 18,491 | 39,800 |
| Percentage | 34.17% | 4.88% | 10.50% |
| | Fourth party | Fifth party |
| Leader | Syed Mehdi Shah | Not declared |
| Party | PPP | PTI |
| Leader's seat | Skardu-I (lost) | - |
| Last election | 20 seats | Did not contest |
| Seats won | 1 | 1 |
| Seat change | ▼19 | ▲1 |
| Popular vote | 69,216 | 42,101 |
| Percentage | 18.26% | 11.11% |
- Map of Gilgit Baltistan showing Assembly Constituencies and winning parties
Chief Minister before election
Syed Mehdi Shah
Pakistan Peoples Party
Elected Chief Minister
Hafiz Hafeezur Rehman
Pakistan Muslim League (Nawaz)

The 2015 Gilgit-Baltistan Assembly elections were held on 8 June 2015. Elections were held in 24 constituencies, each electing one member to the 2nd Gilgit-Baltistan Assembly. 269 candidates contested these elections, either representing one of the political parties of Gilgit-Baltistan (at the time of the 2020 elections) or being an independent candidate.

618,364 voters in Gilgit-Baltistan had the ability to exercise their right to vote in the elections and were able to vote across the province. 329,475 of the people registered to vote were male and 288,889 were female (a gender gap of 8%).

== Background ==
In 2009, the Government of Pakistan passed "The Gilgit-Baltistan Empowerment and Self-governance Order, 2009, and the President of Pakistan Asif Ali Zardari. This order renamed the Northern Areas as "Gilgit-Baltistan" and gave it a limited amount of internal autonomy within Pakistan and self-governance by allowing the people of Gilgit-Baltistan to have elections, where they could elect members of the "Gilgit-Baltistan Legislative Assembly". The position "Chief Minister of Gilgit-Baltistan" was also made. The Assembly would have five-year-long terms.

The first Gilgit-Baltistan elections were held in 2009, and the Pakistan Peoples Party, who then ruled at the federal level as well, won the election by a large margin and formed the government, and Syed Mehdi Shah became the first Chief Minister of Gilgit-Baltistan.

== Campaign and Polling ==
495 candidates from different political parties and Independents submitted their nomination papers out of which 50 nominations were rejected. 445 candidates took part in elections. Parties like Pakistan Muslim League (N), Pakistan Tehreek-e-Insaf and Pakistan Peoples Party stood candidates on all 24 assembly seats.

Polling took place on June 8, 2015 without any break from morning 8 am to evening 4 pm. Total number of 1143 polling stations were set up across the province. Out of 1143 polling stations, 282 were declared highly sensitive, while 269 polling stations were declared sensitive. About 5500 Military Soldiers along with 4356 policemen were deployed to perform security duties to make peaceful polling across the province.

== Results ==
The two tables below show the results of the elections. The first table shows the results for the elections across all 24 constituencies, and shows each political party's standing after independents joining different parties and the allotment of reserved seats. The second table shows the winner of each of the 24 constituencies, 6 reserved seats for women, and 3 reserved seats for technocrats.

| Party | Votes | % | Seats | | | | | |
| Party | Votes | % | General | Women | Technocrat | Independents joined | Total | +/- |
|---|---|---|---|---|---|---|---|---|
| Pakistan Muslim League (N) | 129,526 | 34.17 | 15 | 4 | 2 | 1 | 22 | +20 |
| Pakistan People's Party | 69,216 | 18.26 | 1 | 0 | 0 | 0 | 1 | -20 |
| Pakistan Tehreek-e-Insaf | 42,101 | 11.11 | 1 | 0 | 0 | 0 | 1 | +1 |
| Majlis Wahdat-e-Muslimeen | 39,800 | 10.50 | 2 | 1 | 0 | 0 | 3 | +3 |
| Islami Tehreek Pakistan | 18,491 | 4.88 | 2 | 1 | 1 | 0 | 4 | +3 |
| Jamiat Ulema-e-Islam (F) | 11,148 | 2.94 | 1 | 0 | 0 | 0 | 1 | -3 |
| Balawaristan National Front | 5,259 | 1.39 | 0 | 0 | 0 | 1 | 1 | - |
| All Pakistan Muslim League | 4,485 | 1.18 | 0 | 0 | 0 | 0 | 0 | - |
| Jamaat-e-Islami Pakistan | 3,237 | 0.85 | 0 | 0 | 0 | 0 | 0 | - |
| Muttahida Qaumi Movement | 591 | 0.16 | 0 | 0 | 0 | 0 | 0 | -1 |
| Other parties | 5,842 | 1.54 | 0 | 0 | 0 | 0 | 0 | 0 |
| Independents | 49,336 | 13.02 | 2 | 0 | 0 | -2 | 0 | - |
| Total | 379,032 | 100.00 | 24 | 6 | 3 | 0 | 33 | - |
| Registered voters/turnout | 618,364 | 61.30 | | | | | | |

=== By constituency ===
| Constituency | | Winner | | | | Runner-up | | | | Margin | Registered Voters | Votes Cast | Voter Turnout |
| District | Name | Candidate | Party | Votes | % | Candidate | Party | Votes | % | Margin | Registered Voters | Votes Cast | Voter Turnout |
|---|---|---|---|---|---|---|---|---|---|---|---|---|---|
| Gilgit | GBA-1 | Jafarullah Khan | PML(N) | 7,171 | 36.38% | Amjad Hussain Azar | PPP | 6,297 | 31.95% | 874 | 30,397 | 19,710 | 64.84% |
| Gilgit | GBA-2 | Hafeezur Rehman | PML(N) | 10,739 | 48.18% | Jamil Ahmad | PPP | 7,176 | 32.20% | 3,563 | 34,225 | 22,288 | 65.12% |
| Gilgit | GBA-3 | Muhammad Iqbal | PML(N) | 7,852 | 35.38% | Muhammad Shafi | ITP | 4,555 | 20.52% | 3,297 | 34,413 | 22,193 | 64.49% |
| Hunza–Nagar | GBA-4 | Muhammad Ali Haidar | ITP | 5,039 | 36.90% | Javed Hussain | PPP | 4,091 | 29.96% | 948 | 18,818 | 13,657 | 72.57% |
| Hunza–Nagar | GBA-5 | Rizwan Ali | MWM | 2,171 | 28.43% | Prince Qasim Ali | IND | 1,547 | 20.26% | 624 | 11,992 | 7,635 | 63.67% |
| Hunza–Nagar | GBA-6 | Mir Ghazanfar Ali Khan | PML(N) | 8,242 | 41.18% | Baba Jan | AWP | 4,641 | 23.19% | 3,601 | 36,417 | 20,013 | 54.96% |
| Skardu | GBA-7 | Muhammad Akbar | PML(N) | 3,331 | 29.09% | Raja Jalal Hussain Maqpoon | PTI | 3,330 | 29.08% | 1 | 16,484 | 11,452 | 69.47% |
| Skardu | GBA-8 | Kacho Imtiaz Haider | MWM | 10,411 | 48.41% | Syed Muhammad Ali | PML(N) | 4,841 | 22.51% | 5,570 | 34,281 | 21,508 | 62.74% |
| Skardu | GBA-9 | Fida Muhammad Nashad | PML(N) | 6,201 | 49.74% | Wazir Muhammad Saleem | MWM | 5,730 | 45.96% | 471 | 20,580 | 12,468 | 60.58% |
| Skardu | GBA-10 | Muhammad Sikandar | ITP | 4,949 | 32.44% | Raja Nasir Ali Khan Maqpoon | MWM | 4,933 | 32.34% | 16 | 21,806 | 15,254 | 69.95% |
| Skardu | GBA-11 | Iqbal Hassan | PML(N) | 5,165 | 40.86% | Syed Amjad Ali Zaidi | PTI | 4,985 | 39.44% | 180 | 21,958 | 12,640 | 57.56% |
| Skardu | GBA-12 | Imran Nadeem | PPP | 10,422 | 46.05% | Raja Azam Khan Amacha | PML(N) | 9,930 | 43.88% | 492 | 30,413 | 22,632 | 74.42% |
| Astore | GBA-13 | Rana Farman Ali | PML(N) | 5,942 | 36.95% | Khalid Khurshid | IND | 4,019 | 24.99% | 1,923 | 27,699 | 16,081 | 58.06% |
| Astore | GBA-14 | Barkat Jamil | PML(N) | 3,994 | 25.49% | Abdul Sami | JI | 2,379 | 15.18% | 1,615 | 24,452 | 15,667 | 64.07% |
| Diamer | GBA-15 | Shah Baig | JUI(F) | 3,713 | 22.87% | Fidaullah | PPP | 3,557 | 21.91% | 156 | 27,080 | 16,232 | 59.94% |
| Diamer | GBA-16 | Janbaz Khan | PML(N) | 3,622 | 26.95% | Abdul Aziz | IND | 3,162 | 23.53% | 460 | 27,937 | 13,441 | 48.11% |
| Diamer | GBA-17 | Haider Khan | PML(N) | 4,184 | 36.46% | Rehmat Khaliq | JUI(F) | 3,689 | 32.15% | 495 | 25,622 | 11,475 | 44.79% |
| Diamer | GBA-18 | Muhammad Wakeel | PML(N) | 3,761 | 52.04% | Gulbar Khan | JUI(F) | 2,438 | 33.73% | 1,323 | 15,700 | 7,227 | 46.03% |
| Ghizer | GBA-19 | Nawaz Khan Naji | IND | 5,259 | 26.99% | Shakeel Ahmed | PML(N) | 5,158 | 26.48% | 101 | 31,256 | 19,482 | 62.33% |
| Ghizer | GBA-20 | Fida Khan | IND | 4,991 | 22.87% | Sultan Madad | PML(N) | 3,362 | 15.41% | 1,629 | 34,400 | 21,820 | 63.43% |
| Ghizer | GBA-21 | Raja Jehanzaib | PTI | 7,252 | 39.17% | Ghulam Muhammad | PML(N) | 5,602 | 30.26% | 1,650 | 27,577 | 18,513 | 67.13% |
| Ghanche | GBA-22 | Muhammad Ibrahim Sanai | PML(N) | 11,382 | 85.95% | Amina Bibi Ansari | PTI | 1,860 | 14.05% | 9,522 | 34,721 | 13,242 | 38.14% |
| Ghanche | GBA-23 | Ghulam Hussain | PML(N) | 6,657 | 51.07% | Amina Bibi Ansari | PTI | 5,710 | 43.81% | 947 | 23,286 | 13,035 | 55.98% |
| Ghanche | GBA-24 | Mohammad Shafiq | PML(N) | 5,226 | 45.98% | Muhammad Ismail | PPP | 5,193 | 45.68% | 33 | 16,850 | 11,367 | 67.46% |
| Reserved seats for women | | Sobia Jabeen | PML(N) | | | | | | | | | | |
| Reserved seats for women | | Nasreen Bano | PML(N) | | | | | | | | | | |
| Reserved seats for women | | Rani Attiqa Ghazanfar | PML(N) | | | | | | | | | | |
| Reserved seats for women | | Shireen Akhtar | PML(N) | | | | | | | | | | |
| Reserved seats for women | | Rehana Ibadi | ITP | | | | | | | | | | |
| Reserved seats for women | | Bibi Saleema | MWM | | | | | | | | | | |
| Reserved seats for technocrats | | Aurangzeb Khan | PML(N) | | | | | | | | | | |
| Reserved seats for technocrats | | Muhammad Amin | PML(N) | | | | | | | | | | |
| Reserved seats for technocrats | | Muhammad Shafi | ITP | | | | | | | | | | |

== Aftermath ==
The newly elected assembly members took oath on 24 June 2015. On 25 June, Fida Muhammad Nashad and Jafarullah Khan, both of PML(N), were elected unopposed as Speaker and Deputy Speaker, respectively. Moreover, on 26 June 2015, Hafiz Hafeezur Rehman, also of PML(N), was elected as the 2nd Chief Minister of Gilgit Baltistan unopposed. He took oath on the same day.
