= Balawaristan =

Historic region of Pakistan

Coordinates: 35°35′N 75°9′E

Balawaristan (Urdu: بلاورستان, lit. 'Land of heights'), is a term coined by Nawaz Khan Naji, founder of the Pakistani political party Balawaristan National Front (BNF), for a proposed autonomous province or a sovereign state consisting of Gilgit-Baltistan, Chitral and Kohistan regions in Pakistan as well as the Indian-controlled Ladakh. Although the name, first used in 1989, does not have any historical basis, it sounds similar to Baloristan, which has been documented in Chinese and medieval Islamic sources to describe Baltistan and Gilgit Valley from the 8th century CE.

BNF activists affirm that Balawaristan is not a part of Kashmir and has a unique identity. They also consider the people of Gilgit Baltistan to be the fourth party in the Kashmir dispute, the other three being Pakistan, India and Kashmir.

== Etymology ==
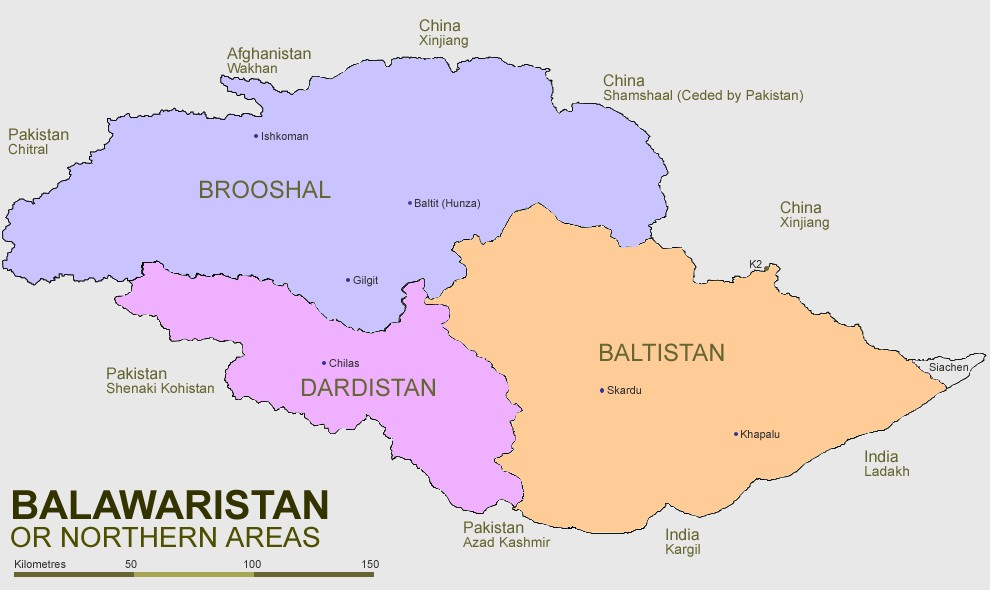
A proposed map of Balawaristan, showing its proposed three regions: Baltistan, Dardistan and Brooshal

Historically, the Baltistan region was called Great Bolor and Dardistan and parts of Brushal (e.g. Gilgit Valley) were called Little Bolor; collectively the two were called Bolor or Boloristan. Great Bolor is known to have sent ambassadors to the Chinese court in the 8th century. The Mons, an Indo-Aryan group, made the region as a hub of Buddhism. Chinese historian Faxian mentioned it as Pololo or Palolo, Tibetans called it Nang-khod, where Arab historians mentioned it as Baloristan.

== Political status movements ==
In more recent times, the name Balawaristan is found used by Gilgiti political party like Balawaristan National Front led by Nawaz Khan Naji. The party is seeking to declare Gilgit-Baltistan as the fifth province of Pakistan. The party has been represented in the Gilgit-Baltistan Assembly by a single member, the aforementioned Nawaz Khan Naji, between 2011 and 2025.

The Balawaristan National Students Organisation, in April 2008, raised a demand for Balawaristan to be constituted into the fifth province of Pakistan.

== Proposed flags ==

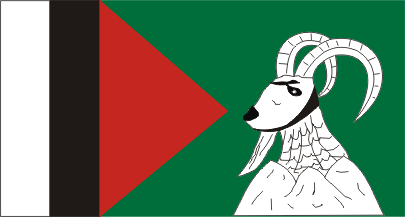

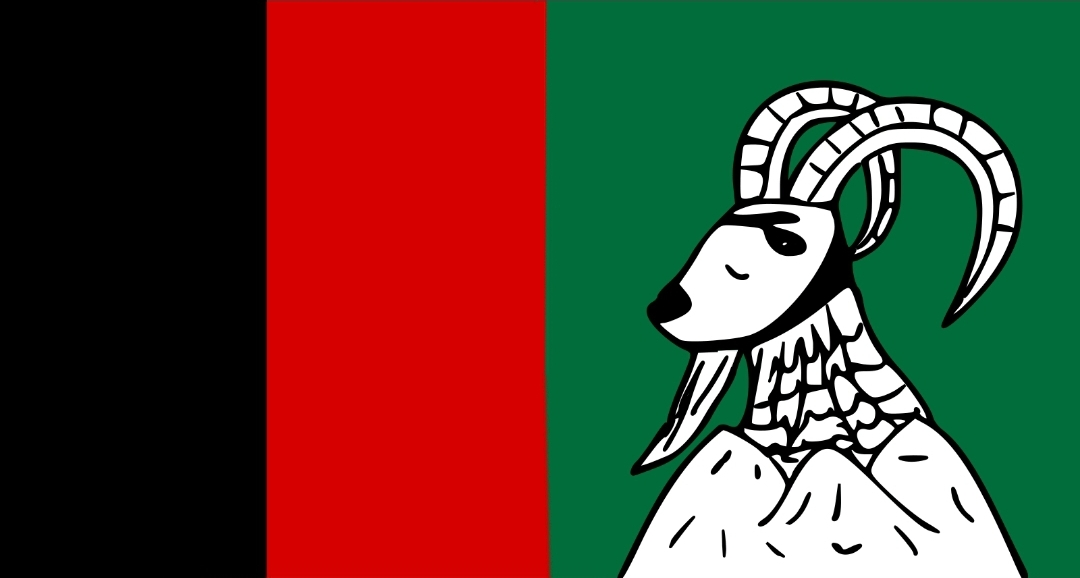

== See also ==
- Shinaki
- Bolor-Tagh
- Gilgit-Baltistan United Movement
- Insurgency in Jammu and Kashmir
- Karakoram Province

== Bibliography ==
- Sökefeld, Martin (1999). "Balawaristan and Other Imaginations: A Nationalist Discourse in the Northern Areas of Pakistan" (PDF). In van Beek, Martijn; Bertelsen, Kristoffer Brix; Pedersen, Poul (eds.). Ladakh: Culture, History, and Development Between Himalaya and Karakoram. Aarhus: Aarhus University Press. pp. 350–368. ISBN 978-81207-2210-1.
- Bodla, Sohaib (2014). "Making a Nation in High Mountains: Balawars and Balawaristan Nationalism in Ghizer District of Gilgit Baltistan" (PDF). Ethnoscripts. 16 (1). University of Hamburg: 125–139. ISSN 2199-7942.
- Dad, Aziz Ali (2016). Baldauf, Ingeborg; Conermann, Stephan; Kreutzmann, Hermann; Nadjmabadi, Shahnaz; Reetz, Dietrich; Schetter, Conrad; Sökefeld, Martin; Bech Hansen, Claus Erik; Hornidge, Anna-Katharina; Mielke, Katja; Nokkala, Nelli (eds.). "Boundaries and Identities: The Case of Gilgit-Baltistan" (PDF). Crossroads Asia Working Papers Series (34). Department of Political and Cultural Change, University of Bonn. ISSN 2192-6034. OCLC 1186074593.
- Sökefeld, Martin (2012). "Secularism and the Kashmir dispute". In Nils Ole Bubandt; Martijn Van Beek (eds.). Varieties of Secularism in Asia: Anthropological Explorations of Religion, Politics and the Spiritual. Routledge. pp. 101–120. ISBN 978-1-136-66864-7.
