= Karam Ali Shah =

Pakistani politician (c.1934–2020)

- کرم علی شاہ

Governor of Gilgit-Baltistan
- In office 26 January 2011 – 16 February 2015
- President: Asif Ali Zardari; Mamnoon Hussain
- Chief Minister: Syed Mehdi Shah; Sher Jehan Mir (caretaker)
- Preceded by: Wazir Baig (acting)
- Succeeded by: Barjees Tahir (acting)

Member of the Gilgit-Baltistan Assembly
- In office 10 December 2009 – 26 January 2011
- Succeeded by: Nawaz Khan Naji
- Constituency: GBA-19 Ghizer-I

Personal details
- Born: Chatorkhand, Northern Areas, Pakistan
- Died: 4 August 2020
- Party: Pakistan People's Party
- Children: Syed Jalal Ali Shah (son)
- Profession: Politician

Pir Karam Ali Shah (died 4 August 2020) was a Pakistani politician from Chatorkhand in the Ishkoman Valley in Ghizer District, Gilgit-Baltistan who served as the Governor of Gilgit-Baltistan from 2011 to 2015. He also served as the first Deputy Chief Executive of the Northern Areas Legislative Council.

== Political career ==
Shah was elected unopposed to the Northern Areas Advisory Council in 1970.

Shah served as the first Deputy Chief Executive of the Northern Areas Legislative Council in the 1990s.

He was elected to the Northern Areas Legislative Council (NALC) as a candidate of PPP in the 1999 elections.

He was re-elected to the NALC from NA-19 Puniyal-Ishkomen as a candidate of PPP in the 2004 elections. He defeated Nawaz Khan Naji, a candidate of Balawaristan National Front (BNF).

He was elected to the Gilgit-Baltistan Assembly from GBA-19 Ghizer-I as a candidate of PPP in the 2009 Gilgit-Baltistan Assembly election. Elections in this constituency were postponed to 22 December 2009 due to the death of a candidate.

He was appointed as the Governor of Gilgit-Baltistan on 26 January 2011, by President of Pakistan, Asif Ali Zardari. He replaced Shama Khalid, the former governor, who had died of cancer four month prior He remained in this position until 16 February 2015, when he was replaced by Barjees Tahir.

== Death ==
He died on 4 August 2020.

== See also ==
- List of current Pakistani governors
