= Karakoram (disambiguation) =

Karakoram most commonly refers to the Karakoram, a major mountain range in Asia.

Karakoram may also refer to:

== Geography and environment ==
- Karakoram fault system, fault system in Karakoram range
- Karakoram Pass, mountainous pass in Karakoram range
- Karakoram Wildlife Sanctuary, sanctuary in Ladakh, India
- Karakoram–West Tibetan Plateau alpine steppe, ecoregion in Asia
- Trans-Karakoram Tract, territory administered by China
- Karakoram National Park, national park in Pakistan

== Infrastructure and transport ==
- Karakoram Express, passenger train in Pakistan
- Karakoram Highway, highway in Pakistan and China

== Institutions and organizations ==
- Karakoram International University, university in Pakistan
- Karakoram Cooperative Bank, bank in Pakistan
- Karakoram (band), Pakistani rock band

== Other uses ==
- Karakoram Province, proposed province in Pakistan

== See also ==
- Karakorum, capital of Mongol Empire
- Karakorum Government, short-lived state in modern-day Russia
