= GBA-19 Ghizer-I =

Constituency for the Gilgit Baltistan Assembly

- Constituency for the Gilgit Baltistan Assembly
- District: Ghizer District
- Region: Ghizer
- Electorate: 31,256

Current constituency
- Created: 2009
- Party: Pakistan People's Party
- Member: Syed Jalal Ali Shah

GBA-19 Ghizer-I is a constituency of Gilgit Baltistan Assembly which is currently represented by Syed Jalal Ali Shah of Pakistan People's Party.

== Members ==
Election	Member	Party	Votes received
2009	Karam Ali Shah	Pakistan People's Party	-
2011	Nawaz Khan Naji	Balawaristan National Front	8,299 votes
2015	Nawaz Khan Naji	Balawaristan National Front (Note: Elected as an independent, assembly records indicate he joined Balawaristan National Front afterwards.)	5,229 votes
2020	Nawaz Khan Naji	Balawaristan National Front (Naji) (Note: Naji is the leader of Balawaristan National Front (Naji), but contested and served as an independent.)	6,468 votes
2026	Syed Jalal Ali Shah	Pakistan People's Party	9,331 votes

== Election results ==
=== 2009 ===
Karam Ali Shah, a candidate of the Pakistan People's Party (PPP) won the 2009 elections. The election for this seat was postponed to 22 December 2009 due to the death of a candidate.

=== 2011 ===
A by-election was held in 2011, due to Karam Ali Shah, the previous member from this seat, becoming the governor. Nawaz Khan Naji, a candidate and the leader of the Balawaristan National Front (BNF) was elected.

=== 2015 ===
Nawaz Khan Naji, an independent candidate and leader of BNF, won this seat again by getting 5,259 votes. Assembly records indicate he later joined BNF.

2015: Ghizer-I
Party	Candidate	Votes	%
Independent	Nawaz Khan Naji	5,259	26.99%
PML-N	Shakeel Ahmad	5,158	26.98%
Independent	Zaffar Muhammad	5,135	26.35%
PTI	Niamat Shah	1,667	8.55%
APML	Syed Madad Shah	1,010	5.18%
PPP	Badr-U-Din	909	4.66%
Independents & Others		344	1.76%
Turnout		19,482	62.33%
Balawaristan National Front hold		Swing	

=== 2020 ===
General elections were held on 15 November 2020. Nawaz Khan Naji, an independent candidate and leader of Balawaristan National Front (Naji) (BNF(N)), won the election with 6,208 votes.

=== 2026 ===
General elections ere held on 7 June 2026. Syed Jalal Ali Shah, a candidate of Pakistan People's Party (PPP) won the election with 9,331 votes.

Election 2026: GBA-19 Ghizer-I
Party	Candidate	Votes	%	±%
PPP	Syed Jalal Ali Shah	9,331	34.06	
PML(N)	Zafar Muhammad	7,460	27.23	
Independent	Nawaz Khan Naji	7,075	25.82	
IPP	Atif Salman	1,589	5.80	
PTI	Sher Azeem Khan (Note: PTI members who contested in the general election ran as independent candidates aligned with the party because the Election Commission Gilgit-Baltistan prohibited the PTI election symbol.)	1,272	4.64	
Others	Others (three candidates)	671	2.45	
Valid ballots		27,398	97.43	
Rejected ballots		723	2.57	
Turnout		28,121	61.29	
Majority		1,871	6.83	
Registered electors		45,885		
PPP gain from Independent				
