= Balawaristan National Front (Naji) =

Political party in Gilgit Baltistan, Pakistan

Balawaristan National Front بلاورستان نيشنل فرنٹ
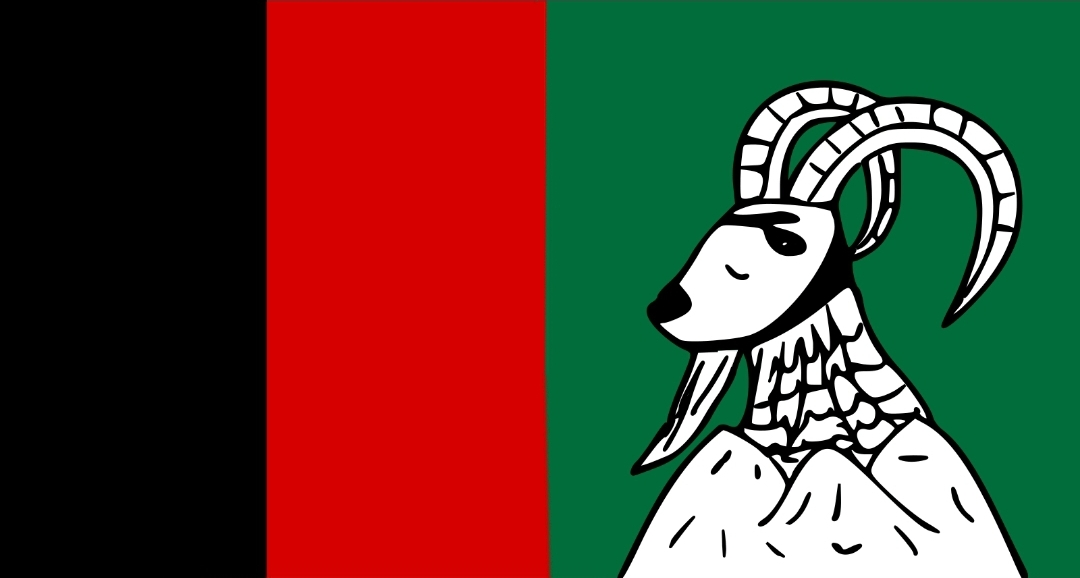
- Abbreviation: BNF
- Leader: Nawaz Khan Naji
- Spokesperson: Shafqat Inqilabi
- Founder: Nawaz Khan Naji
- Founded: 28 December 1989; 36 years ago
- Preceded by: Balawaristan National Front
- Headquarters: Ghizer, Pakistan
- Ideology: Autonomy for Gilgit-Baltistan; Self-determination; Anti-taxation
- Religion: Islam
- Colors: Green
- Gilgit-Baltistan Legislative Assembly: 1 / 33

Election symbol
- Revolver

Party flag

The Balawaristan National Front (Urdu: بلاورستان نيشنل فرنٹ , romanized: Balāwaristān Naishanal Franṭ abbr. BNF), more commonly known as the BNF, is a Pakistani political party of Gilgit-Baltistan. It was founded by Nawaz Khan Naji in 1989. The party calls for Gilgit-Baltistan to be given autonomy while still remaining a part of the Pakistani federation, and to be declared the fifth province of Pakistan.

The party is led by Nawaz Khan Naji and has been represented in the Gilgit-Baltistan Legislative Assembly by a single member, the aforementioned Nawaz Khan Naji, since 2011.

The party has high amounts of support in Ghizer District, where the founder of BNF Naji is from, and from smaller isolated pockets throughout the rest of Gilgit-Baltistan.

== Ideology ==
=== Gilgit-Baltistan autonomy ===
The main struggle of BNF is the autonomy for Gilgit-Baltistan. It calls for autonomy for Gilgit-Baltistan while being a part of Pakistan. It believes that Gilgit-Baltistan is a disputed territory. The BNF believes that Gilgit-Baltistan is a distinct entity and is separate from the rest of the Kashmir region. It also believes that the rulings of the Supreme Court of Pakistan should not be effective in Gilgit-Baltistan on account of it being disputed. The main aim of the BNF is to make Gilgit-Baltistan a self-governing, autonomous, constitutionally-recognized region within Pakistan, similar to Azad Kashmir, until the Kashmir Plebiscite.

=== Economics ===
The BNF has expressed support for the China-Pakistan Economic Corridor.

=== Anti-taxation ===
The BNF believes that Gilgit-Baltistan should be considered a "tax-free zone" and that the Federal Board of Revenue has no right to collect taxes from Gilgit-Baltistan, because Gilgit-Baltistan is currently a disputed territory.

=== Self-determination ===
The BNF also believes in self-determination, and believes that the final say of Gilgit-Baltistan's status belongs with the people of Gilgit-Baltistan.

== History ==
The Balawaristan National Front was formed by Nawaz Khan Naji, Mohammad Rafiq and Shujaat Ali and Abdul Hamid Khan, but has broken into two parties since then, the BNF(H) and BNF(N). This was because Abdul Hamid Khan had far more extreme views and was much more strongly nationalist than Naji, who restricted his demands to autonomy. The BNF(H) was banned by the government of Pakistan.

== Electoral history ==
In 2011, the BNF fielded Nawaz Khan Naji, in Constituency GBA-19 (Ghizer-I) in order to win the by-poll that was occurring there. He won with 8,299 votes, and over 3,000 more votes than his closest competitor, Karim Ahmed Shah of the PML(N). After his victory, Naji was reported as having said "We have contested elections in the past but it is our first win in the legislative assembly".

Upon taking the oath of office on June 6, 2011, Naji promised to remain faithful to the state of Pakistan, and reaffirmed his belief that while his party wished to see Gilgit-Baltistan be a separate state, the final status of Gilgit-Baltistan had to be decided by the people of Gilgit-Baltistan rather than just one person or party.

Although he was the only nationalist member of the Gilgit-Baltistan Legislative Assembly, he was welcomed in and was given support by other members after he took his oath. One member of the assembly, Independent politician Deedar Ali, said (while talking about Naji): "If others try to sideline a member in the assembly, we will support him".

Naji once again ran in the 2015 Gilgit-Baltistan Assembly election to represent his constituency, GBA-19 (Ghizer-I), this time as an Independent politician, and won the contest with 5,259 votes (26.99% of the vote), narrowly edging out the PML(N)'s candidate, Shakeel Ahmed. After winning the election, he switched his official party allegiance to "Balawaristan National Front".

The BNF did not officially field any candidates once again in the 2020 Gilgit-Baltistan Assembly election, but Naji once again ran to represent his constituency, GBA-19 (Ghizer-I), in 2020. Preliminary and unofficial results have shown Naji is the winner in this constituency once again, winning 6,208 votes, over 1,000 more votes than his closest competitor, Pir Jalal Ali Shah of the Pakistan Peoples Party, who received 4,967 votes. He still claims himself as the leader of the BNF(N) on all social media websites, though, and certain news outlets have reported this as a victory for the BNF(N), even though he officially has run as an independent candidate.

== Leaders ==
List of Chairman of Balawaristan National Front
Order	Image	Presidents	Year	Rationale
1		Nawaz Khan Naji	1989–present	First term

== See also ==
- Nawaz Khan Naji
- Kashmir Conflict
- Gilgit-Baltistan
- Balawaristan
