= Syed Jalal Ali Shah =

Pakistani politician from Gilgit-Baltistan

- سید جلال علی شاہ

Member of the Gilgit-Baltistan Assembly
- Incumbent
- Assumed office 22 June 2026
- Preceded by: Nawaz Khan Naji
- Constituency: GBA-19 Ghizer-I

Minister for Planning and Development, Gilgit-Baltistan
- Incumbent
- Assumed office 27 July 2026

Personal details
- Party: Pakistan People's Party
- Parent: Karam Ali Shah (father)

Syed Jalal Ali Shah is a Pakistani politician who has served as a member of the Gilgit-Baltistan Assembly from GBA-19 Ghizer-I since taking oath on 22 June 2026, following his election to the seat earlier that month. He is the son of Karam Ali Shah, the former Governor of Gilgit-Baltistan and first Deputy Chief Executive of the Northern Areas Legislative Council.

== Political career ==
Shah contested the 2020 Gilgit-Baltistan Assembly election from GBA-19 Ghizer-I as a candidate of the Pakistan People's Party (PPP), but was unsuccessful. He received 4,967 votes and was defeated by Nawaz Khan Naji, an independent candidate, by a margin of 1,241 votes.

He was elected to the Gilgit-Baltistan Assembly from GBA-19 Ghizer-I as a PPP candidate in the 2026 Gilgit Baltistan Assembly election, defeating Zafar Muhammad of the Pakistan Muslim League (N). The Gilgit-Baltistan Election Commission initially withheld the result for this constituency, along with six others, pending objections, before declaring Shah the winner.

On 27 July 2026, he was among seven PPP members sworn into the Gilgit-Baltistan cabinet of Chief Minister Amjad Hussain Azar; an eighth PPP nominee, Syed Tauqeer Mehdi, was unable to attend the ceremony after Baltistan Road was blocked. Portfolios were allotted separately following the oath-taking. Shah was subsequently given the portfolio of Minister for Planning and Development.
