= Hisham Shamieh =

Syrian translator

- هشام شامية
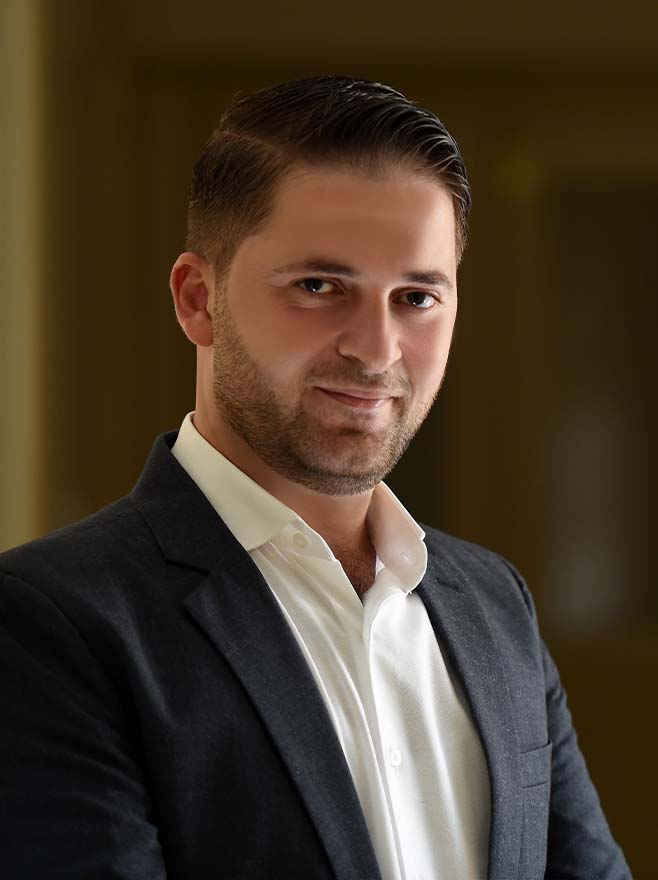
- Born: 1985 (age 40–41); Damascus, Syria
- Occupation: Translator
- Known for: Arabic translations of religious and historical studies

Hisham Shamieh (Arabic: هشام شامية) is a Syrian translator specializing in pre-Islamic Arabian history, comparative religion, political thought, and critical studies of Islamic origins and religious discourse. His translations are cataloged by libraries and include Arabic editions of scholarly works on early Islamic history, Qur’anic textual scholarship, and Islamic historiography. His works are produced in collaboration with publishers in the Arab region. His translations have been cited in peer-reviewed research and specialized outlets.

== Career ==
After studying English–Arabic translation at the University of Damascus, Shamieh transitioned to full-time literary translation after the outbreak of the Syrian civil war, he participated in a Syria-based cultural initiative focused on translating works on religion, history, and free thought. Shamieh has worked on Arabic editions of academic studies in early Islamic history, Qur’anic textual research, and religious historiography. He is listed as a translator with Naqesh Publications and as a member/translator with the Academic Center for Research.

== Reception and impact ==
Shamieh’s Arabic translations have been cited or used in scholarly venues, including: a 2023 article by Mominoun Without Borders on historical-anthropological approaches to Qur’anic studies; a 2024 peer-reviewed paper (University of Kufa / IASJ) listing The Concept of Allah and Divine Counterparts in Pre-Islamic Arabia among primary sources; a 2024 article from the Tafsir Center for Qur’anic Studies on manuscript methodology; and a 2025 IASJ paper on Islamic historiography and textual criticism.

== Selected translations ==
- Muhammad at Mecca (W. Montgomery Watt) — Dar al-Takween, 2025. ISBN 9789933702717.
- Living My Life (Emma Goldman) — Naqesh Publications & Dar Shleer, 2024. ISBN 9783989190511.
- Revolutions in Reverse: Essays on Politics, Violence, Art, and Imagination (David Graeber) — Naqesh Publications, 2023. ISBN 9783989190108.
- Twilight of Democracy: The Seductive Lure of Authoritarianism (Anne Applebaum) — Arabic ed., 2022. ISBN 9789921712605.
- Philology of Islam: The Qur’an, Islam, the Caliphate (selected studies by Theodor Nöldeke) — Academic Center for Research, 2024. ISBN 9781990131295.
- Sex and Eroticism in Mesopotamian Literature (Gwendolyn Leick) — Academic Center for Research, 2022. ISBN 9781990131370.
- The Idea of Idolatry and the Emergence of Islam (G. R. Hawting) — Academic Center for Research, 2021. ISBN 9781990131110.
- Islam’s Hidden Origins (Volker Popp) — Arabic ed., 2021.
- Polytheists and Judeo-Christian Groups in the Quran (Patricia Crone) — Academic Center for Research, 2019.
- The Church in the Shadow of the Mosque (Sidney H. Griffith) — Academic Center for Research, 2018.
- Divinity and Tribes: Studies in Pre-Islamic Arabian Religion (multi-author volume) — Academic Center for Research, 2019. ISBN 9781927946879.
- The Concept of Allah and Divine Counterparts in Pre-Islamic Arabia (multi-author volume) — Academic Center for Research, 2020. ISBN 9781927946824.
- Muʿāwiya ibn Abī Sufyān: From Arabia to Empire (R. Stephen Humphreys) — Academic Center for Research, 2022.
- Pre-Islamic Mecca: A Historical Reconstruction (multi-author volume) — Academic Center for Research, 2019. ISBN 9781927946763.
- The Origins and Early Development of Shiʿa Islam (S. H. M. Jafri) — Dar wa Maktabat Adnan, 2024. ISBN 9789922732398.

== Memberships and affiliations ==
Hisham Shamieh is listed as a contributor at Naqesh Publications and the Academic Center for Research.

== See also ==
- Islamic historiography
- List of translators
- Patricia Crone
- G. R. Hawting
- Theodor Nöldeke
- Emma Goldman
