= Karakoram Province =

Karakoram Province is a proposed autonomous region for the Shi'a Islam-majority areas of northern Pakistan. According to the movement for autonomy in the 1980s, it was to span most of the Karakoram mountain range, covering Gilgit District, Kurram Agency and the Shia majority areas of Punjab and the North-West Frontier Province. However, the Zia Regime violently opposed any religious based movement for autonomy.

== Groups supporting autonomy for Karakoram Province ==
- Gilgit Baltistan United Movement
- Balawaristan National Front
