= Abdul Hamid Khan (Gilgit-Baltistan activist) =

Pakistani politician (born 1953)

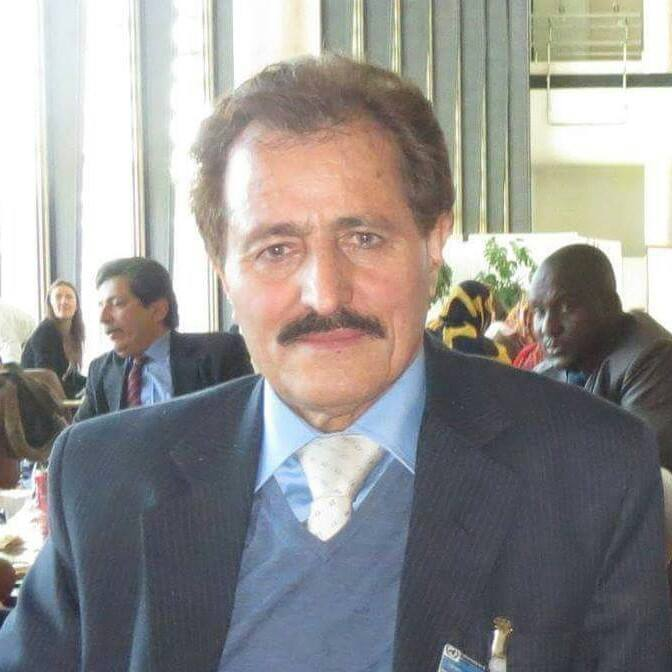
Abdul Hamid Khan

Abdul Hamid Khan is the chairman of the Balawaristan National Front (Hameed group) (BNF-H), a sub-nationalist organisation. In 1995, he founded the Balawaristan National Front Hameed Group (BNF-H), which sought autonomy for Gilgit-Baltistan and opposed the construction of hydroelectric dams there. In 1999, Abdul Hameed Khan left Pakistan. He spent 20 years living in India and Belgium. However, after spending 20 years living abroad, Abdul Hamid unconditionally surrendered to Pakistani security officials on 8 February 2019. His organisation, BNF-H, was banned by National Counter Terrorism Authority (NACTA) on 26 February 2019.

== Self-imposed exile ==
In 1999, Abdul Hamid Khan went to Nepal and later moved to India. According to Pakistani officials, Abdul Hamid was recruited by the Research & Analysis Wing (RAW). In India he met Col Arjun and Joshi. During his stay in India, he lived in a luxury apartment in New Delhi. Later on, Abdul Hamid's family, including three sons, were moved to India and were admitted to various schools and colleges in Dehradun, where a huge investment was made by RAW for 11 years (1999 to 2007 and 2015 to 2018). Abdul Hamid was provided with all kinds of Indian ID documents and was facilitated to run business.

According to Pakistani officials, Abdul Hamid Khan was moved to Brussels in 2007 so that he could appear at international forums and take part in anti-Pakistani activities. One of his actions was to send letters to the international financial institutions to make the case that no funds should be provided to Pakistan for building six proposed dams in Gilgit-Baltistan or places like Khyber Pakhtunkhwa's Kohistan and Chitral districts that the BNF-H claims to be historically part of Gilgit-Baltistan.

== Surrender ==
Abdul Hamid Khan unconditionally surrendered on 8 February 2019. Later on, the head of BNF-H student wing, Sher Nadir Shahi, also surrendered to the Pakistani security forces on 29 March 2019. Shahi was accused of trying to recruit people in Gilgit-Baltistan to join BNF-H. Abdul Hameed Khan was also the mentor of Sher Nadir Shahi.

Following their surrender Pakistani security forces conducted a major intelligence-based operation in May 2019. The operation busted the local chapter of BNF-H. In the operation, 14 more member of BNF-H were arrested. BNF-H members possessed huge cache of arms which was also captured by the security forces during the operation.

Pakistan security officials claim that Abdul Hameed Khan and Sher Nadir Shahi had links with the Research and Analysis Wing (RAW), the Indian intelligence agency,. Furthermore, security officials disclosed that BNF-H had made long-term plans to sow chaos in Gilgit-Baltistan at the behest of RAW by brainwashing the people through secessionist and anti-state propaganda and also to conduct terrorist attacks against the state. According to Pakistani officials, RAW invested heavily in Abdul Hamid Khan, providing him with more than one billion Indian rupees. Out of the one billion Indian rupees, 700 million rupees were sent to Pakistan through different channels. The money was used to finance anti-Pakistani activities.

In 2020, he returned to Pakistan and ended his 23 year old exile after issuing an apology and claiming, "During my exile, 25,000 Euros was paid to me monthly by RAW to create unrest and instability in Gilgit-Baltistan. However, I used the money to support students by paying their tuition fees, and other needy people."
