= Gilgit-Baltistan United Movement =

- Abbreviation: GBUM
- Chairperson: Manzoor Parwana
- General Secretary: Muhammad Iqbal
- Founder: Manzoor Hussain Parwana
- Headquarters: Skardu Baltistan
- Ideology: Autonomous Gilgit Baltistan

The Gilgit-Baltistan United Movement (GBUM) is a political movement of Gilgit-Baltistan based in Skardu, Pakistan. It demands a fully autonomous state consisting of Gilgit and Baltistan, formerly known as the Northern Areas.

The GBUM states that the Gilgit-Baltistan regions, formerly known as the Northern Areas, should be denoted "Gilgit-Baltistan" and that the Northern Areas Legislative Council should be given the status of an "Independent Constitutional Assembly" and given similar rights granted to the existing Azad Kashmir Legislative Assembly.

== Claim to recover a past independence ==
According to the GBUM, the region enjoyed a brief period of independence between November 1, 1947, when the suzerainty of the Dogra rulers of the Kashmir princely state ceased to exist, and November 16, 1947, when the Pakistani tribal forces and Pakistani Army soldiers invaded the region. According to British Major William Brown, there was a secret plan among the Gilgit Scouts to set up a "Republic of Gilgit-Astor" when they ousted the armed forces of the Maharajah of Kashmir's armed forces on November 1, 1947.

== Gilgit–Baltistan Democratic Alliance (GBDA) ==
Before the GBUM, there was a Gilgit-Baltistan Democratic Alliance (GBDA), promoting the same claims, together with the Balawaristan National Front (claiming the independence of a larger political entity, Balawaristan).
