= Freiheit (1879) =

German anarchist journal

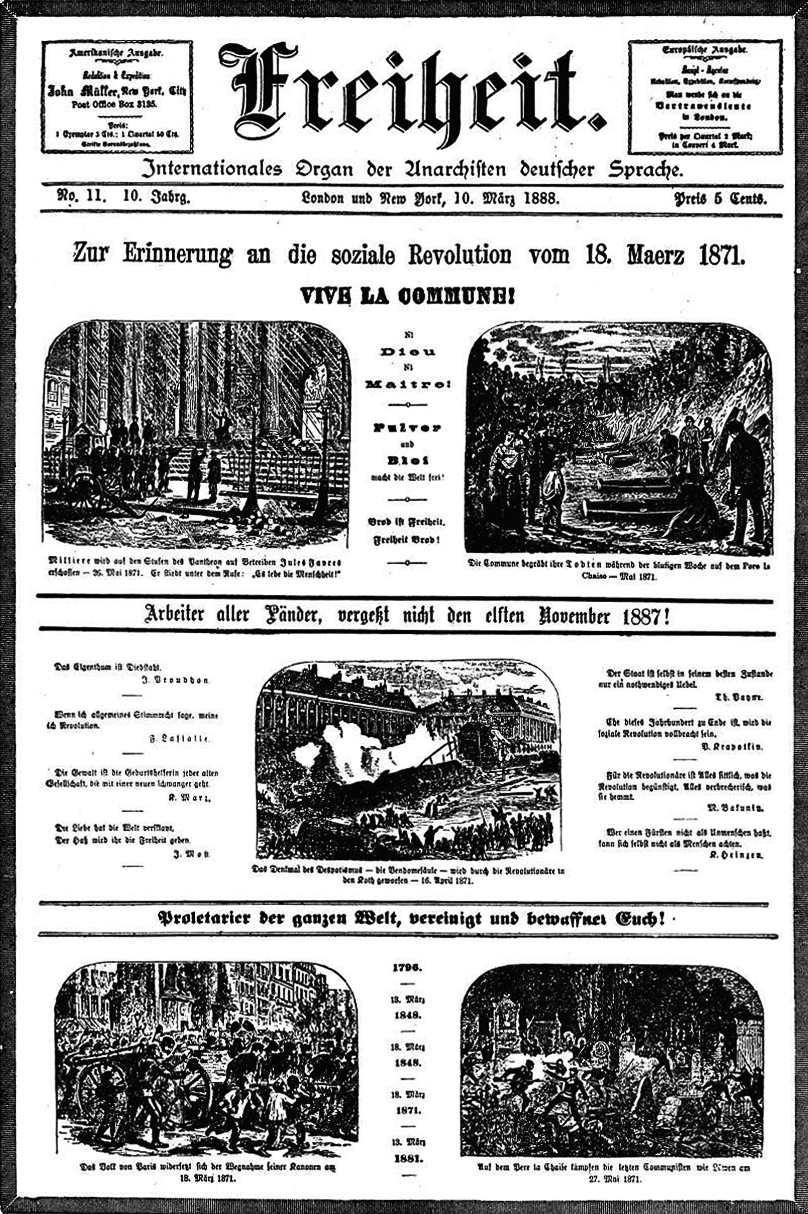
- Titlepage of Freiheit, March 10, 1888
- Founder: Johann Most
- Editor: Johann Most (1879–1881); Frank Kitz (1881); Victor Dave (1881–1882); Johann Most (1884–1905); Helene Minkin (1905–1907); Max Baginski (1907–1910)
- Founded: January 14, 1879
- Ceased publication: August 13, 1910
- Political alignment: Anarchism
- Language: German
- City: London (1879–1882); New York (1882–1910)
- Country: United Kingdom (1879–1882); United States (1882–1910)
- Circulation: c. 5,000
- OCLC number: 173828288

Freiheit (German for Freedom) was a long-running anarchist journal established by Johann Most in 1879. It was known for advocacy of attentat, or propaganda of the deed—revolutionary violence that could inspire people to revolution.

Most began the German-language journal in London, aiming it at expatriate Germans and Austrians. He brought the publication with him when he immigrated to the United States just a few years later in 1882.

Freiheit, and Most, were not shy about criticizing fellow anarchists, and work published in Freiheit often fomented controversies in anarchist circles. For instance, Most and Benjamin Tucker carried out a well-publicized disagreement in the pages of their respective journals, and although Tucker championed Most's revolutionary philosophy later, the schism never healed.

Some years later, Emma Goldman and Alexander Berkman became involved with the Freiheit group, only to leave after conflicts with Most arose. When Berkman, inspired by Most's theory of the attentat, was imprisoned for the attempted assassination of Henry Clay Frick, Most criticized Berkman's action. Goldman was infuriated and publicly took a horse-whip to Most at his lecture, demanding a proof or a retraction.

The journal's publication occasionally faltered when Most was imprisoned—at least once, for writings he published in Freiheit—but fellow anarchists kept the journal afloat during those times.

When its charismatic founder and editor died in 1905, the publication began to fail. Freiheit ceased publication in 1910 after 28 years.

== Editors ==
1879: Johann Most
1881: Frank Kitz
1881: Victor Dave
1884: Johann Most
1905: Helene Minkin
1907: Max Baginski

== Other sources consulted ==
- Emma Goldman, Living My Life
- Wendy McElroy, "The Schism Between Individualist and Communist Anarchism", Journal of Libertarian Studies, v.15, n.1 (Fall 2000).
- George Woodcock, Anarchism: A History of Libertarian Ideas and Movements (2004)
- "Lights Out in the City of Light" -- Anarchy and Assassination at the Pan-American Exposition, University of Buffalo Library exhibition.
- Sharon Rudahl, A Dangerous Woman
- Frank Harreck-Haase, Der Agitator – Das Leben des Johann Most, 1. Band – Der Sozialist, Chemnitz, 2017, ISBN 978-3-00-056998-2 (in German)
- Frank Harreck-Haase, Der Agitator – Das Leben des Johann Most, 2. Band – Der Anarchist, Chemnitz, 2019, ISBN 978-3-00-060890-2 (in German)

== See also ==
- List of anarchist periodicals
