= Chatorkhand =

Village in Gilgit-Baltistan, Pakistan

- Village
- Location within Gilgit Baltistan Location within Pakistan
- Coordinates: 36.3514°N 73.8502°E
- Country: Pakistan
- Administrative unit: Gilgit-Baltistan
- District: Ghizer
- Time zone: UTC+5:00 (PST)

Chatorkhand is a village in Pakistan. It is situated in Ghizer district of Gilgit-Baltistan. It is the headquarter of Ishkoman tehsil.

== Geography ==
Chatorkhand is located at an elevation of 6850 feet above sea level. It is about 80 km northwest of Gilgit city and lies in Ishkoman Valley. It is the largest settlement in the valley.

== Landmarks ==
The village has a small bazaar and several teahouses. Other facilities include schools for girls and boys.

== Terrain and tourism ==
Chatorkhand area attracts tourism because of its mountainous terrain. Trekking is a popular activity here and is considered less strenuous than in the more challenging terrain elsewhere in Gilgit-Baltistan. The village has lodging and boarding facilities for trekkers and other tourists.

== See also ==
- Ishkoman Valley
- Ghizer
- Gilgit-Baltistan
