= Identity documents of India =

Documents proving an individual's identity in India

Identity documents of India are the documents which are used to prove identity in India.

While there is no single mandatory document, the following documents are used in lieu of a national identity.

== List of identity documents of India ==
- Aadhaar Card, issued by Unique Identification Authority of India
- PAN Card, issued by the Income Tax Department
- Voter ID Card issued by the Election Commission of India
- Indian Passport, issued by Ministry of External Affairs of the Republic of India
- Driving license in India issued by the respective state governments (Ministry of Road Transport & Highways (MoRTH) Government of India)
- ABHA Card issued by the National Health Agency
- OCI Card (Overseas Citizenship of India), issued by Ministry of External Affairs of the Republic of India
- Ration card issued by the Government of India
- Identity Certificate for non-citizens or stateless people
- A Birth certificate issued by the Registry of Births and Deaths (RBD) or from a Municipality within the provisions of the RBD Act
- Transfer/School leaving/Matriculation Certificate
- Service Identity Card issued by State/Central Government, Public Sector Undertakings, local bodies or public Limited Companies
- Copy of an extract of the service record of the applicant (only in respect of Government servants) or the Pay Pension Order (in respect of retired Government Servants), duly attested/certified by the officer/in-charge of the Administration of the concerned Ministry/Department of the holder
- Policy Bond issued by Public Life Insurance Corporations/Companies
- Scheduled Caste/Scheduled Tribe/Other Backward Classes Certificates
- Freedom Fighter Identity Cards
- Arms Licenses
- Property Documents such as Pattas, Registered Deeds etc.
- Railway Identity Cards
- Student Photo Identity Cards issued by Government Recognized Educational Institutions in respect of full time courses
- Gas Connection Bill
- Bank/ Kisan/ Post Office Passbooks
- Photo Bank ATM Card
- Photo Credit Card
- Pensioner Photo Card
- Certificate of Identify having photo issued by Gazetted Officer or Tehsildar on letterhead
- Unique Disability ID (UDID) Card / Disability medical certificate issued by the respective State / UT
- Marriage Certificate
- Proof of Marriage document issued by the Registrar
- Gazette Notification
- Legal Name Change Certificate
- Land revenue certificate
- Land Certificate

Identity documents are used for multiple purposes:

- For domestic and international travel
- To obtain a mobile phone SIM card
- To apply for a passport
- To obtain government benefits
- In certain cases when asked to do so by law-enforcement officers

== Issues ==
A large number of people remain without identity documents - poor people especially. In order to include them, identity requirements for Aadhaar have been reduced, however biometric facilities have been provided to reduce or eliminated duplication, so while it may be possible to obtain the card under a false name, it is less likely to be able to obtain another Aadhaar card under a different (or real) name, though there have been cases where the biometrics has been circumvented.

There was a criticism that India has too many identity systems, and they are not consistently accepted. As a solution, GOI introduced Aadhaar Cards in 2012, which is most widely accepted identification document in India and can be easily obtained by any person of any age group.
