= Nawaz Khan Naji =

Pakistani politician from Gilgit-Baltistan

- نواز خان ناجی

Member of the Gilgit-Baltistan Assembly
- In office 25 November 2020 – 24 November 2025
- Succeeded by: Syed Jalal Ali Shah
- Constituency: GBA-19 Ghizer-I
- In office 24 June 2015 – 23 June 2020
- Constituency: GBA-19 Ghizer-I
- In office 6 June 2011 – 9 December 2014
- Preceded by: Karam Ali Shah
- Constituency: GBA-19 Ghizer-I

Personal details
- Born: Ghizer, Gilgit-Baltistan
- Party: Independent; Balawaristan National Front (Naji)
- Profession: Politician

Nawaz Khan Naji is a Pakistani politician who had served as a member of the Gilgit-Baltistan Assembly from 2011 to 2025. Born in Sherqilla village, Ghizer District, Naji graduated in political science from University of Karachi, Sindh. He came back to Gilgit-Baltistan and founded his own nationalist political party, Balawaristan National Front, on 28 December 1989.

== Political career ==
Naji was elected to the Gilgit-Baltistan Assembly in a 2011 by-election from GBA-19 Ghizer-I as a candidate of Balawaristan National Front (BNF). He received 8,299 votes and defeated Karim Khan, a candidate of Pakistan Muslim League (N) (PML(N)). He took the oath of office on 6 June 2011.

He was re-elected to the Gilgit-Baltistan Assembly from GBA-19 Ghizer-I as an independent candidate in the 2015 Gilgit-Baltistan Assembly election. He received 5,2,59 votes and defeated Shakeel Ahmed, a candidate of PML(N). Assembly records indicate he later joined BNF.

Although Naji claims to be the head of Balawaristan National Front (Naji), he contested in the 2020 Gilgit-Baltistan Assembly election on 15 November 2020 from GBA-19 Ghizer-I as an independent candidate. He won the election by the margin of 1,241 votes over the runner up Syed Jalal Ali Shah of Pakistan People's Party (PPP). He garnered 6,208 votes while Shah received 4,967 votes.

He contested the 2026 Gilgit Baltistan Assembly election from GBA-19 Ghizer-I as an independent candidate, but was unsuccessful. He received 7,075 votes, placing third, and was defeated by Syed Jalal Ali Shah, a candidate of PPP.
