= Boloristan =

Bolor or Boloristan was the ancient name of the region roughly corresponding to present-day Gilgit-Baltistan and Chitral in Pakistan, stretching from Kafiristan in east to Ladakh to the west. The name continued to be used in one form or other until 18th-century.

== Historical references ==
The name first occurs in the writings of Chinese pilgrims, in the form of Po-lu-lo. According to 7th century Chinese monk, Xuanzang, the country of Po-lu-lo was located in the midst of the great Snowy Mountains. It stretched from east to west, and was narrow from north to south. The region produced wheat and pulse, gold and silver, and had large quantity of gold. The climate was cold. The people were rough and rude in character, and wore clothes made of wool. Their writing script was nearly like those of India, but their language was somewhat different.

A 9th century Arab source refers to the region as Balad-i Bolur. According to the 10th-century Hudud al-'Alam, Bolor was a vast region whose ruler was known as Bolurin-shah. Al-Biruni noted that notable towns in Bolur were Gilgit, Asawira (identified with Astore) and Shiltas (identified with Chilas).

According to Marco Polo, Bolor was inhabited by people following paganism. According to Tarikh-i-Rashidi of Mirza Haidar Dughlat in 16th century, Baluristan was bounded on the east by the provinces of Kashghar and Yarkand; on the north by Badakhshan; on the west by Kabul and Laghman; and on the south by the dependencies of Kashmir. Its whole extent consisted of mountains, valleys, and defiles, and the population was numerous.

In the 17th century, Khushal Khattak referred to region as Baluristan in his Swatnama, mentioning that it lay north of Swat Valley.

In the 17th-century Tarikh-i-Kashgar, Bolor was mentioned as referring to Chitral. By 18th-century, Qing dynasty records mention arrival of an embassy from Bolur, referring to Chitral, in 1764.
