= The Science of Revolutionary Warfare =

1885 revolutionary manual by Johann Most

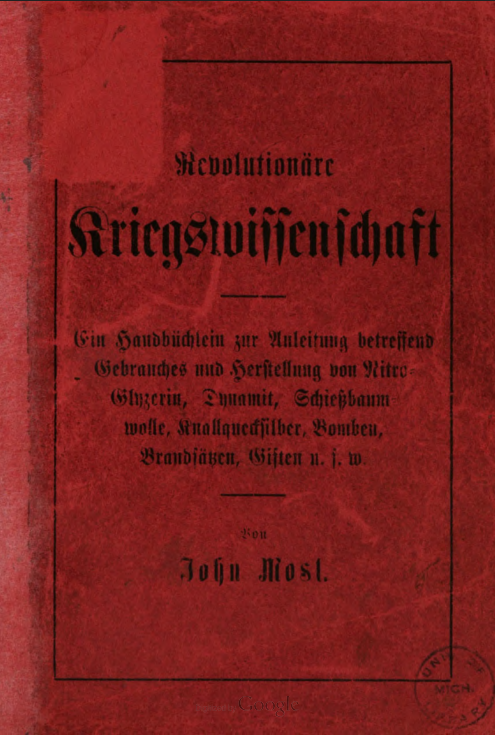
- Author: Johann Most
- Language: German
- Subject: Anarchism; Propaganda by the deed
- Publication date: 1885
- Publication place: Germany, United States of America

The Science of Revolutionary Warfare (in German: Revolutionäre Kriegswissenschaft) is a revolutionary manual written by the anarchist militant Johann Most in 1885. Being the first revolutionary manual in history, it is a work in which the author sought to promote the idea of propaganda by the deed, but also and especially to provide methods for carrying it out, such as manufacturing explosives, poisons, incendiary materials, invisible ink, or other "recipes". Most distinguished himself by drawing most of his information from publicly available sources of his time and by trying to offer affordable and practical methods for his contemporaries.

The work innovated on numerous points of revolutionary and terrorist strategy but became a textbook case representing anarchist terrorism, which served to criminalize all anarchists. For instance, it was used during the trial following the Haymarket Square massacre to accuse anarchists of belonging to a terrorist conspiracy. This difficult legacy, coupled with the very approximate nature of the methods used to make explosives like dynamite, gave this text a particular status among anarchists.

The text was updated by the Italian anarchist Luigi Galleani in La Salute è in voi (1906), a work aiming to address the issues raised by Most's manual and propose more effective approaches.

== History ==
In the 19th century, anarchism emerged and took shape in Europe before spreading. Anarchists advocate a struggle against all forms of domination perceived as unjust including economic domination brought forth by capitalism. They are particularly opposed to the State, seen as the organization that legitimizes a good number of these dominations through its police, army and propaganda.

In the late 1870s, anarchists developed the strategy of propaganda of the deed, aiming to disseminate anarchist ideas directly through action, bypassing discourse, and to ignite the Revolution through actions that would incite the people to revolt. Figures in the anarchist movement such as Peter Kropotkin, Errico Malatesta, Andrea Costa, and Carlo Cafiero extensively developed this strategy. In 1879, it was adopted by the congress of the Jura Federation in La Chaux-de-Fonds. It gained renewed centrality at the International Congresses of Paris and London in May and July 1881.

Generally, and particularly in Germany and the United States, one of the first major proponents and theorists of this strategy was Johann Most (1846-1906). The anarchist was convinced of the relevance of using this strategy, and in the newspaper he organized, Freiheit, he very strongly advocated for the use of propaganda of the deed starting in 1880. For example, he offered recipes for creating various kinds of bombs, incendiary devices, poisons, and so on. In one of the statements noted by Andrew R. Carlson as indicative of this support, he declared:

We will murder those who must be killed in order to be free... We do not dispute over whether it is right or wrong. Say what you will, do what you do, but the victor is right. Comrades of Freiheit, we say murder the murderers. Rescue mankind through blood, iron, poison, and dynamite.

In 1884, after discreetly engaging himself in a pyrotechnics factory, he learned how to make dynamite and planned to send it to several anarchist groups in Europe—but he was quickly dissuaded by the impossibility of the task. He therefore resolved to compile some of the literature he had written on the subject of propaganda of the deed, assembling it into this seventy-four-page work.

== The Science of Revolutionary Warfare ==
=== Goals ===
The text's goal is to reach the largest possible number of people, providing them with a manual accessible even to the poorest, enabling them to become politicized and fight. Most, like other anarchists, believed that the working class and peasants learning science, especially chemistry, was an effective way to combat the state's unequal armaments. In this regard, a bomb, poison or these methods were seen as tools to bridge the gap between the state's weaponry and that of the oppressed.

=== Contents ===
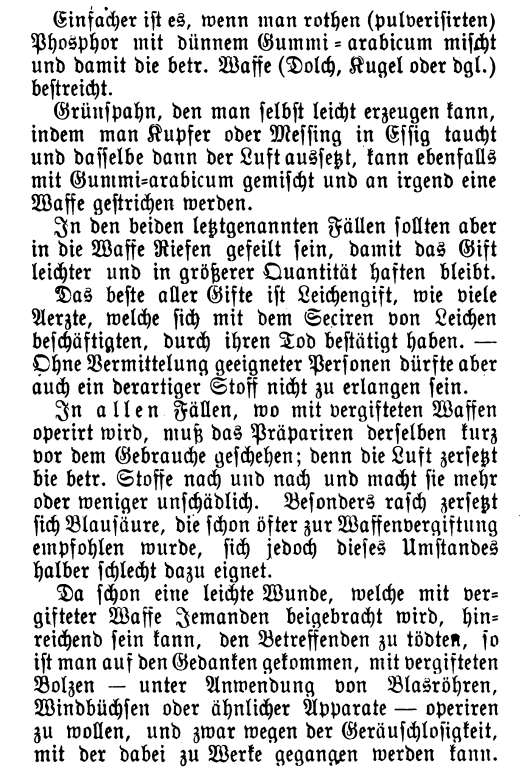
One of the parts of The Science of Revolutionary Warfare giving poison ideas, including cyanide, among others

The text was published in 1885 and bore the full title of The Science of Revolutionary Warfare: A Manual of Instruction in the Use and Preparation of Nitroglycerine, Dynamite, Gun-Cotton, Fulminating Mercury, Bombs, Fuses, Poisons, etc.

Among all the "recipes" in the book, the author stood out for his focus on offering methods using affordable and readily available raw materials, making it some sort of "DIY guide". Most also included information he gleaned from official publications, such as reports on explosions, and used mostly public processes to avoid censorship.

Among these "recipes", one finds a number for making various products, including explosives like dynamite. Most himself stated in the work that his methods for dynamite were approximate and that it was better to steal it directly, which ensured its reliability, an advice followed by other anarchists who used the manual. He also provided advice on how to discreetly set fire to one's own residence to collect insurance money.

The book wasn't limited to explosives; it also provided ways to make invisible ink, flammable products sometimes compared to Molotov cocktails, and numerous methods for using poison, including creating it and applying it to bullets, blades, or nails. Finally, it focused on the possibility of poisoning the wealthy by adding certain products to their food, for instance, if the person were serving the dishes.

== Legacy and nuances ==
=== General influences ===
The Science of Revolutionary Warfare is the first revolutionary manual in history. While other manuals for making explosives existed before it in scientific and specialized literature, Most innovated on several points. This includes not only his presentation style but also some of the recipes and ideas he developed, which are sometimes considered avant-garde for their time.

=== Influence, criminalization, and criticisms among anarchists ===
Johann Most's The Science of Revolutionary Warfare was indeed used by some anarchists in the early 1880s and 1890s, but its methods for producing explosives were quickly noted for being highly approximate. For example, Emma Goldman stated that she and Alexander Berkman attempted to follow the book's instructions for making bombs without success.

Although it was the first anarchist work of its kind, it was quickly denounced within anarchist circles, not only for these practical problems but also because it became a textbook case representing anarchist terrorism. This served to criminalize all anarchists, even those who didn't support propaganda of the deed, by allowing the invocation of "anarchist terrorist literature". For instance, during the trial following the Haymarket Square massacre, the book was used by the U.S. police to justify their actions and criminalize the victims. Most himself was gradually viewed with increasing distance by a number of anarchists. He never truly subscribed to anarcho-communism, and his stances were sometimes criticized, especially as the strategy of propaganda of the deed itself began to be questioned. As a result, the work holds an ambiguous legacy among anarchists.

Despite this, it was also adopted as a model by certain anarchists, such as Luigi Galleani, author of La Salute è in voi in 1906, an updated version of Most's work intended to make it more relevant and effective.

== Bibliography ==
- Baker, Zoe (2023), Means And Ends: The Revolutionary Practice of Anarchism in Europe and the United States (PDF), Chico, CA: AK Press Distribution, ISBN 978-1-84935-498-1
- Carlson, Andrew R. (1972), Anarchism in Germany (PDF), The Scarecrow Press, ISBN 0-8 108-0484-0
- Eisenzweig, Uri (2001). Fictions de l'anarchisme [Fictions of anarchism] (in French). France: C. Bourgois. ISBN 2-267-01570-6.
- Gage, Beverly (2009), The Day Wall Street Exploded: A Story of America in Its First Age of Terror, Oxford: Oxford University Press (OUP), ISBN 978-0-19-514824-4
- Jourdain, Edouard (2013). L'anarchisme [Anarchism]. Paris: La Découverte. ISBN 978-2-7071-9091-8.
- Larabee, Ann (2015), The Wrong Hands : Popular Weapons Manuals and Their Historic Challenges to a Democratic Society, Oxford: Oxford University Press (OUP)
- Most, Johann (1978). The Science of Revolutionary Warfare. The Combat Bookshelf. Phoenix, AZ: Desert Publications. ISBN 978-0879472115.
- Ward, Colin (2004). Anarchism: A Very Short Introduction. Oxford University Press (OUP).
