= Karakoram Cooperative Bank =

Cooperative financial institution in Gilgit-Baltistan, Pakistan

Karakoram Cooperative Bank Limited
- Formerly: Northern Areas Provincial Cooperative Bank Limited
- Type: Cooperative bank
- Industry: Financial services
- Founded: 1956
- Headquarters: Shahrah-e-Quaid-e-Azam, Jutial, Gilgit, Pakistan
- Number of locations: More than 50 branches (2025)
- Area served: Gilgit-Baltistan
- Key people: Maqsad Ali (Acting General Manager)
- Number of employees: Approximately 850 (2025)
- Website: kcb.com.pk

Karakoram Cooperative Bank Limited (KCBL) is a cooperative financial institution headquartered in Gilgit, Gilgit-Baltistan, Pakistan. Established in 1956 as the Northern Areas Provincial Cooperative Bank Limited, it provides deposit, credit and other financial services throughout Gilgit-Baltistan.

In 2025, Business Recorder described KCBL as the largest cooperative bank in Gilgit-Baltistan, with more than 50 branches and approximately 16,000 micro, small and medium enterprise borrowers.

KCBL is a non-scheduled financial institution. It has nevertheless maintained a longstanding institutional relationship with the State Bank of Pakistan (SBP) in connection with proposed licensing, regulatory requirements and banking infrastructure.

== History ==
KCBL was established in 1956 under the Cooperative Societies Act, 1925, as the Northern Areas Provincial Cooperative Bank Limited. According to the bank, it remained affiliated with the Federal Bank for Cooperatives from 1977 until 2002.

The institution subsequently expanded across Gilgit-Baltistan, including into areas with limited access to conventional banking facilities.

A 2021 judgment of the Gilgit-Baltistan Chief Court described KCBL as a financial institution providing credit and other services throughout the region and discussed its governance structure, shareholders and regulatory transition.

In 2020, then chief executive officer and general manager Syed Ghulam Muhammad said KCBL operated 48 branches, maintained approximately 279,000 customer accounts and employed around 750 people.

At the time, discussions were reported between the Government of Gilgit-Baltistan and the State Bank of Pakistan concerning the proposed future banking status of KCBL.

By 2025, independent reporting described the bank as having more than 50 branches and around 16,000 MSME borrowers.

== Government shareholding and governance ==
Government involvement in KCBL's governance predates the later acquisition of substantial government shareholding. Under the institution's governance arrangements, the Chief Secretary of Gilgit-Baltistan is ex-officio chairman of the Board of Directors.

A dispute concerning the constitution of KCBL's Board of Directors and appointment of its general manager reached the Gilgit-Baltistan Chief Court through proceedings brought by shareholders.

The shareholders challenged the nomination of directors and the proposed recruitment of a chief executive/general manager. Among other arguments, they contended that shareholders had not approved the board through an annual general meeting and that senior officers of KCBL should have been considered for the position.

The Chief Court rejected the challenge. It held that the relevant KCBL bylaws permitted nomination of directors under the prescribed procedure and that appointment of the general manager was to be based on professional qualification, experience, conduct and performance rather than seniority alone.

=== Government acquisition of shares ===
The same 2021 litigation dealt with proposals to alter KCBL's ownership and regulatory structure.

The judgment recorded correspondence between the Government of Gilgit-Baltistan and the State Bank of Pakistan concerning proposed licensing and the establishment of a regulated banking institution based on KCBL.

The court referred to conditions communicated by the State Bank that were required to be fulfilled before the proposed licensing process could proceed. The arrangements contemplated majority government ownership of KCBL.

The Chief Court directed the Chief Secretary and Finance Secretary of Gilgit-Baltistan to accelerate compliance with the conditions required by the State Bank. It further directed that government funds allocated for the purpose be used to acquire shares in KCBL and ordered the Chief Secretary, on behalf of the Government of Gilgit-Baltistan, to purchase at least 80 per cent of the institution's shares.

Subsequent government financial legislation documented substantial government investment in KCBL.

The Gilgit-Baltistan Finance Act 2024 specifically referred to dividends earned on Rs800 million in KCBL shares held by the government and required the dividends to be deposited into the Gilgit-Baltistan Consolidated Fund.

=== Government representation on the board ===
As of 2026, KCBL's published Board of Directors included a number of senior Gilgit-Baltistan government officials.

The Chief Secretary is chairman, while senior officials including the Additional Chief Secretary, Finance Secretary, Director General Anti-Corruption Gilgit-Baltistan and Registrar of Cooperatives were represented on the board.

This governance structure gives senior government officials substantial formal representation in KCBL's Board of Directors.

== Employees and human resources ==
KCBL has become a significant financial-sector employer in Gilgit-Baltistan.

In 2020, the bank reported approximately 750 employees.

In December 2023, KCBL announced the regularisation of contingent employees and approval of promotions that it said had remained pending for several years.

The bank also announced increases in employee salaries, benefits and performance-related bonuses and plans to use professional testing for management-trainee recruitment.

By December 2025, a KCBL tender for employee health-insurance coverage described the institution as having approximately 850 employees.

== Relationship with the State Bank of Pakistan ==
KCBL is not currently a scheduled bank. An audit report of the Auditor General of Pakistan described it as a non-scheduled and un-rated bank while examining the placement of public funds with the institution.

KCBL's non-scheduled status is distinct from its institutional dealings with the State Bank of Pakistan.

The 2021 Gilgit-Baltistan Chief Court judgment documented correspondence involving KCBL, the Government of Gilgit-Baltistan and the State Bank concerning proposed licensing and restructuring of the institution.

The court directed government authorities to fulfil conditions required by the State Bank and to coordinate with SBP as part of the proposed licensing process.

KCBL has subsequently continued to incorporate SBP-related requirements into aspects of its operational development.

In December 2025, KCBL issued a tender for the procurement and implementation of an SBP-compliant Core Banking System.

These records demonstrate that KCBL's status as a non-scheduled cooperative institution does not mean an absence of institutional dealings with the State Bank. They do not, however, establish that the SBP policy rate automatically determines KCBL's customer lending rates.

== Operations and lending ==
KCBL provides savings, deposit and lending facilities across Gilgit-Baltistan.

According to the bank, lending includes agricultural and commercial credit for cooperative societies, traders, contractors and other businesses. Financing has also been provided for activities including transport, fish farming, poultry, garments and other small-scale enterprises.

In November 2025, KCBL partnered with Karandaaz Pakistan and the National Credit Guarantee Company Limited to launch Samarkar, a credit-risk facility intended to expand financing for women-led micro, small and medium enterprises in Gilgit-Baltistan.

The programme targeted enterprises in sectors including agriculture, handicrafts, tourism and small-scale trade.

== Advance Salary Scheme ==
KCBL operates an Advance Salary Scheme for salaried employees and pensioners.

The scheme is available to eligible employees and pensioners of government, semi-government, non-governmental and autonomous organisations.

As of 2026, the published product terms provided financing of up to Rs3 million for periods of three to five years, repayable through 36 or 60 instalments.

The bank's public product page does not state a numerical interest rate. Instead, it describes the applicable rate as "As per KCBL's Policy and SOC". It also states that borrower life insurance applies and that repayments are deducted at source.

== Interest-rate controversy and public response ==
In a public video circulated on Facebook, Acting General Manager Maqsad Ali addressed criticism concerning KCBL's lending rates and discussed the distinction between KCBL's status as a cooperative, non-scheduled institution and scheduled commercial banks regulated by the State Bank of Pakistan.

The statement generated extensive criticism in the public comment thread attached to the video. Commenters questioned the clarity of the explanation and challenged the distinction drawn between KCBL's lending-rate decisions and State Bank monetary policy. A recurring criticism was that KCBL had increased lending rates during periods in which the State Bank had increased its policy rate, while customers expected corresponding reductions when the policy rate subsequently declined.

Other commenters called for reductions in the markup charged under KCBL lending schemes and some threatened to move their accounts or boycott the institution.

The criticism took place against the background of KCBL's formal status as a non-scheduled bank and its continuing institutional dealings with the State Bank over proposed licensing and regulatory requirements.

KCBL's published Advance Salary Scheme does not publicly specify a numerical current interest or markup rate, referring customers instead to the bank's policy and Schedule of Charges.

== Leadership ==
=== Sher Jehan Mir ===
Banker Sher Jehan Mir headed KCBL before entering public office.

In December 2014, Prime Minister Nawaz Sharif appointed Mir caretaker Chief Minister of Gilgit-Baltistan. Dawn reported at the time that Mir was chief executive officer of KCBL, formerly known as the Northern Areas Provincial Cooperative Bank.

During Mir's tenure as caretaker chief minister, his political neutrality was questioned by the Pakistan Tehreek-e-Insaf.

In February 2015, PTI chairman Imran Khan alleged that Mir had links with the ruling Pakistan Muslim League (N). Mir denied the allegation and said that he was not affiliated with any political party.

In March 2015, PTI representatives challenged appointments in the caretaker administration and alleged that Mir and other officials were closely associated with PML-N.

=== Syed Ghulam Muhammad ===
Syed Ghulam Muhammad later was chief executive officer and general manager of KCBL.

In 2020, he represented the bank during discussions concerning possible SME-bank status and expansion of its operations.

His subsequent removal from office became the subject of prolonged litigation before the courts of Gilgit-Baltistan.

=== Maqsad Ali ===
Maqsad Ali was in KCBL's senior management before becoming acting head of the institution.

KCBL communications previously identified him as Head of Operations.

By September 2024, KCBL was identifying Ali as Acting Chief Executive Officer. That month he led a senior delegation from the bank in a meeting with Gilgit-Baltistan Chief Minister Gulbar Khan, who pledged government support for KCBL.

In November 2025, Business Recorder identified Maqsad Ali as KCBL's chief executive officer while reporting on the launch of the Samarkar financing initiative.

As of September 2026, KCBL's official management page listed him as Acting General Manager.

His public statement concerning KCBL's relationship to State Bank policy and lending rates subsequently generated criticism on social media.

== Legal proceedings and incidents ==
=== Astore branch embezzlement case ===
In October 2022, six employees of KCBL's Astore branch, including the branch manager, were arrested over the alleged embezzlement of approximately Rs120 million from the bank.

The employees were subsequently released on bail.

In February 2023, Dawn reported that only a small proportion of the funds had been recovered and that senior administration and police officials had reviewed the investigation.

=== Syed Ghulam Muhammad employment litigation ===
KCBL became involved in prolonged employment litigation with former chief executive officer and general manager Syed Ghulam Muhammad concerning his removal from office.

According to Pamir Times, a division bench of the Gilgit-Baltistan Chief Court ruled in October 2024 in Muhammad's favour, declaring his removal unlawful, procedurally defective and mala fide and ordering his reinstatement.

The authorities challenged that judgment before the Supreme Appellate Court of Gilgit-Baltistan and obtained a stay order.

During the pendency of the appeal, Muhammad was dismissed again through an order dated 10 March 2025. He challenged the second dismissal before the Chief Court, which suspended it on 2 June 2025.

In a judgment dated 15 December 2025, the Chief Court again set aside Muhammad's dismissal. Pamir Times reported that the court described the dismissal as null and void, arbitrary, mala fide and without lawful authority and directed that Muhammad be reinstated with back benefits and entitlements.

The report further stated that the court found that allegations of corruption and misconduct relied upon against Muhammad lacked a legal basis.

On 13 May 2026, the Chief Court directed the respondents to implement its December 2025 judgment and submit a compliance report.

The respondents included the chairman of KCBL's Board of Directors/Chief Secretary Gilgit-Baltistan, Registrar of Cooperative Societies, Acting General Manager of KCBL and the bank's human-resources manager.

== See also ==
- Banking in Pakistan
- State Bank of Pakistan
- Gilgit-Baltistan
- Chief Minister of Gilgit-Baltistan
