= Muslim historiography =

Muslim historiography may refer to:

- Tarikh, the Arabic, Persian and Turkic word for historiography
- Historiography of early Islam
- List of Muslim historians

== See also ==
- History of Islam
