= Johann Most =

German-American anarchist (1846–1906)

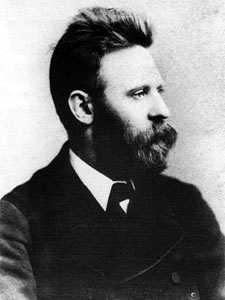
- Most, c. 1890

Member of Reichstag from Chemnitz
- In office 5 February 1874 – 11 June 1878

Personal details
- Born: February 5, 1846 Augsburg, Kingdom of Bavaria
- Died: March 17, 1906 (aged 60) Cincinnati, Ohio, US
- Party: Social Democratic
- Occupation: Politician; journalist

Johann Joseph "Hans" Most (February 5, 1846 – March 17, 1906) was a German-American Social Democratic and then anarchist politician, newspaper editor, and orator. He is credited with popularizing the concept of "propaganda of the deed" in the United States. Most became a widely noted controversial figure when he published literature on how to make and use bombs, and was imprisoned several times for advocacy of violent anarchism.

== Early years ==
According to biographer Frederic Trautmann, Johann Joseph Most was born out of wedlock to a governess and a clerk in Augsburg, Bavaria. Most's mother died of cholera when he was very young. Most was subjected to physical abuse by his stepmother and a schoolteacher; his aversion to religion earned him more beatings at school. To the end of his life he was "a militant atheist with the zeal of a religious fanatic" who "knew more Scripture than many clergymen knew".

Most developed frostbite on the left side of his face as a young child. For several years thereafter, flesh rotted and infection spread, with the primitive medicine of the day unable to treat the condition. His condition worsened and he was diagnosed with terminal cancer. As a last-gasp measure a surgeon was called in. A two-inch section of his jawbone was removed, resulting in permanent disfigurement.

At the age of twelve, Most organized a strike of students against a particularly hated teacher, resulting in his expulsion from school. This ended his brief period of formal education, forcing him into the workforce as a youth. He was apprenticed to a bookbinder, for whom he had to bind books from dawn until sunset, a condition which Most later likened to slavery. At the age of 17 he became a journeyman bookbinder and plied his trade from town to town and job to job, working in 50 cities in six countries from 1863 to 1868. In Vienna he was fired and placed on a blacklist for having staged a strike. Unemployable in his trade, he learned to make wooden boxes for hats, cigars, and matches, which he sold on the street until police brought an end to his trade for lacking a license.

== Political career ==
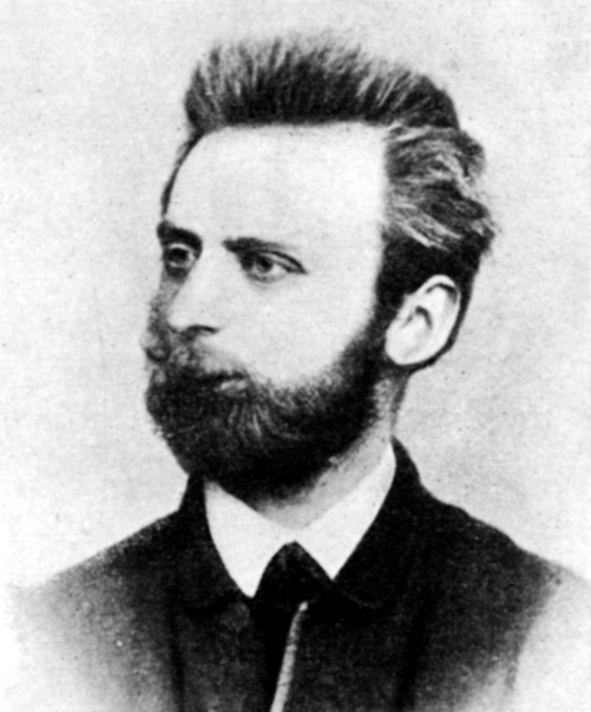
Most aged 33, 1879

As the 1860s drew to a close, Most was won over to the ideas of international socialism, an emerging political movement in Germany and Austria. He saw in the doctrines of Karl Marx and Ferdinand Lassalle a blueprint for a new egalitarian society and became a fervid supporter of Social Democracy, as the Marxist movement was known in the day.

Most engaged himself as editor of socialist newspapers in Chemnitz and Vienna, both were suppressed by the authorities, he also worked as editor of the Berliner Freie Presse (Berlin Free Press). He was a dedicated advocate of revolutionary socialism, sharing the views expressed by Wilhelm Liebknecht in an 1869 speech where he had said; "Socialism cannot be realized within the present state. Socialism must overturn the present state." In 1873, he wrote a summary of Marx's Das Kapital. At Liebknecht's request, Marx and Friedrich Engels made some corrections to Most's text for a second edition published in 1876, despite the fact that the pair did not believe the pamphlet represented a satisfactory summary of Marx's work.

In the 1874 German federal election, Most was elected to represent the Chemnitz constituency as a Social Democratic Workers' Party of Germany deputy in the Reichstag, in which he served until 1878. He was repeatedly arrested for his verbal attacks on patriotism, religion, ethics and for his gospel of terrorism, preached in prose and in many songs such as those in his Proletarier-Liederbuch (Proletarian Songbook). Some of his experiences in prison were recounted in the 1876 work, Die Bastille am Plötzensee: Blätter aus meinem Gefängniss-Tagebuch (The Bastille on Plötzensee: Pages from my Prison Diary).

After advocating violent action, including the use of explosives, as a mechanism to bring about revolutionary change, Most was forced into exile by the government. He first traveled to France but was forced to leave at the end of 1878, settling in London instead. There he founded his own newspaper, Freiheit (Freedom), with the first issue coming off the press on January 4, 1879. Convinced by his own experiences of the futility of parliamentary action, he began to espouse the doctrine of anarchism, which led to his expulsion from the German Social Democratic Party in 1880. In March 1881, he expressed his delight in the pages of Freiheit over the assassination of Tsar Alexander II of Russia and advocated its emulation; for this he was imprisoned by British authorities for a year and a half.

== Life in the United States ==
Anything that can tear up the side of a mountain should definitely be effective against a high society party attended by royalty or capitalist exploiters (monopolists).

— Johann Most, Science of Revolutionary Warfare

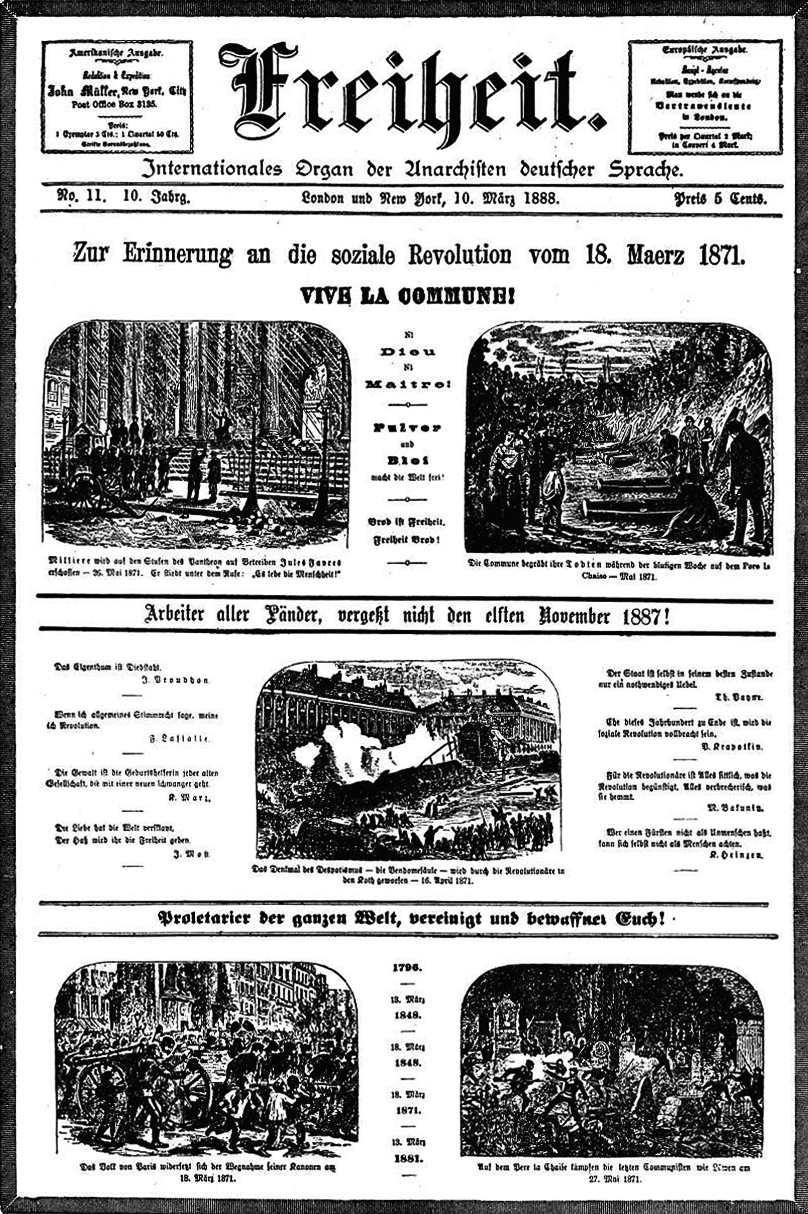
Cover of Freiheit (German for "freedom")

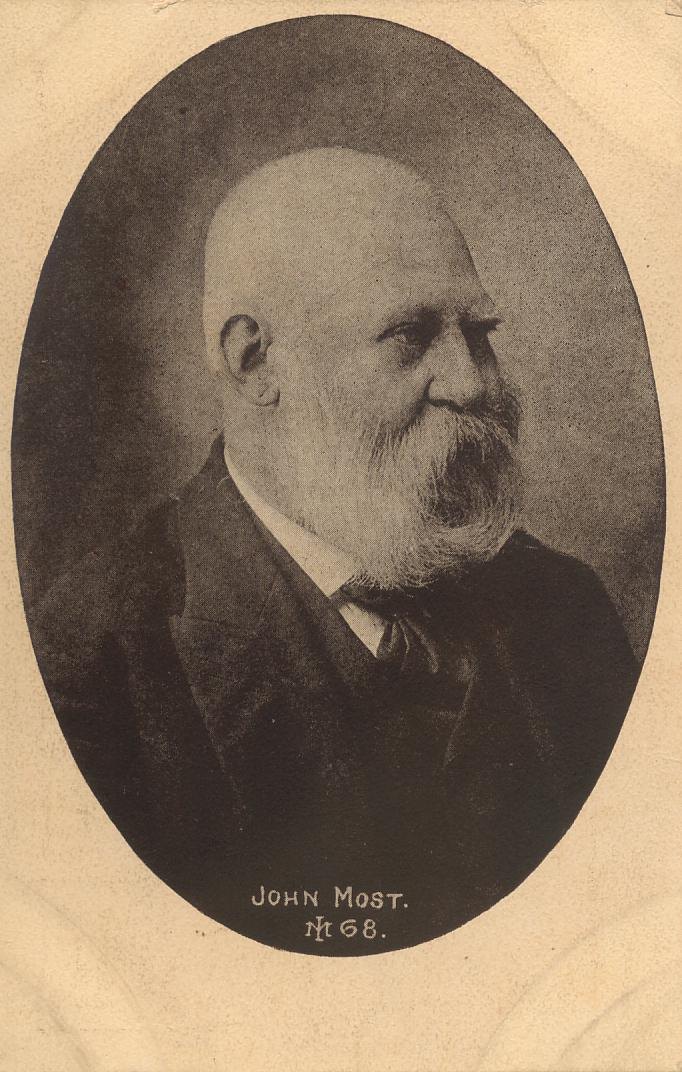
Most in his later years

Encouraged by news of labor struggles and industrial disputes in the United States, Most emigrated to the US upon his release from prison in 1882. He promptly began agitating in his adopted land among other German émigrés. Among his associates was August Spies, one of the anarchists hanged for conspiracy in the Haymarket Square bombing, in whose desk police found an 1884 letter from Most promising a shipment of "medicine," his code word for dynamite.

Most resumed the publication of the Freiheit in New York. He was imprisoned in 1886, again in 1887, and in 1902, the last time for two months for publishing after the assassination of President McKinley an editorial in which he argued that it was no crime to kill a ruler. He said: "Whoever looks at America will see: the ship is powered by stupidity, corruption, or prejudice." Most initially advocated traditional collectivist anarchism, but later embraced anarchist communism. Most was famous for stating the concept of the "propaganda of the deed" (Attentat): "The existing system will be quickest and most radically overthrown by the annihilation of its exponents. Therefore, massacres of the enemies of the people must be set in motion."

Most is best known for a pamphlet published in 1885: The Science of Revolutionary Warfare, a how-to manual on the subject of bomb-making which earned the author the moniker "Dynamost". A gifted orator, Most propagated these ideas throughout Marxist and anarchist circles in the United States and attracted many adherents, most notably Emma Goldman and Alexander Berkman. Inspired by Most's theories of attentat, Goldman and Berkman, enraged by the deaths of workers during the Homestead strike, put words into action with Berkman's attempted assassination of Homestead factory manager Henry Clay Frick in 1892. Berkman and Goldman were soon disillusioned as Most became one of Berkman's most outspoken critics. In Freiheit, Most attacked both Goldman and Berkman, implying Berkman's act was designed to arouse sympathy for Frick.

Goldman's biographer Alice Wexler suggests that Most's criticisms may have been inspired by jealousy of Berkman. Goldman was enraged, and demanded that Most prove his insinuations. When he refused to respond, she confronted him at next lecture. After he refused to speak to her, she lashed him across the face with a horsewhip, broke the whip over her knee, then threw the pieces at him. She later regretted her assault, confiding to a friend, "At the age of twenty-three, one does not reason."

Most was in Cincinnati, Ohio, to give a speech when he fell ill. He was diagnosed with erysipelas. The doctors could do little for him, and he died a few days later.

== Personal life ==
His grandson was Boston Celtics radio play-by-play man Johnny Most.

== Works ==
Note: This list includes only titles published in German or English. Some of Most's writings were translated into Italian, Spanish, Russian, Yiddish, French, Polish, and other languages.

- Neuestes Proletarier-Liederbuch von Verschiedenen Arbeiterdichtern (Latest Proletarian Songbook by Various Worker-Poets). Chemnitz: Druck und Verlag der Genossenschafts-Buchdruckerei, 1873.
- Kapital und Arbeit: Ein Populärer Auszug aus "Das Kapital" von Karl Marx (Capital and Labor: A Popular Excerpt from "Capital" by Karl Marx). Chemnitz: G. Rübner, n.d. [1873]. Revised 2nd edition, 1876.
- Die Pariser Commune vor den Berliner Gerichten: Eine Studie über Deutschpreussische Rechtszustände. (The Paris Commune in Front of Berlin Courts: A Study of German-Prussian Legal Conditions). Brunswick, Germany: Bracke Jr., 1875.
- Die Bastille am Plötzensee: Blätter aus meinem Gefängniss-Tagebuch (The Bastille on Plötzensee: Pages from my Prison Diary). Brunswick, Germany: W. Bracke, 1876.
- Der Kleinbürger und die Socialdemokratie: Ein Mahnwort an die Kleingewerbtreibenden (The Petty-Bourgeois and Social-Democracy: A Warning to Small Businessmen). Augsburg: Verlag der Volksbuchhandlung, 1876.
- Gewerbe-Ordnung für das Deutsche Reich: Mit Erläuterung der für den Arbeiter wichtigsten Bestimmungen (The Industrial Code of the German Empire: With Commentary on the Most Important Provisions for the Worker). Leipzig: Verlag der Genossenschaftsbuchdruckerei, 1876.
- Freizügigkeits-Gesetz, Impf-Gesetz, Lohnbeschlagnahme-Gesetz, Haftpflicht-Gesetz: Mit Erläuterung der für den Arbeiter wichtigsten Bestimmungen (The Law on Freedom of Movement, the Law on Vaccination, the Law on Wage Attachment, the Law on Liability: With Commentary on the Most Important Provisions for the Worker). Leipzig: Verlag der Genossenschaftsbuchdruckerei, 1876.
- "Taktika" contra "Freiheit": Ein Wort zum Angriff und zur Abwehr ("Tactics" versus "Freedom": A Word on Attack and Defence). London: Freiheit, n.d. [c. 1881].
- Revolutionäre Kriegswissenschaft: Eine Handbüchlein zur Anleitung Betreffend Gebrauches und Herstellung von Nitro-Glycerin, Dynamit, Schiessbaumwolle, Knallquecksilber, Bomben, Brandsätzen, Giften usw., usw. (The Science of Revolutionary Warfare: A Little Handbook of Instruction in the Use and Preparation of Nitroglycerine, Dynamite, Gun-Cotton, Fulminating Mercury, Bombs, Fuses, Poisons, Etc., Etc.). New York: Internationaler Zeitung-Verein, c. 1883.
- Die Freie Gesellschaft: Eine Abhandlung über Principien und Taktik der Kommunistischen Anarchisten: Nebst Einem Polemischen Anhang (The Free Society: An Essay on the Principles and Tactics of the Communist Anarchists: With a Polemical Appendix). New York: self-published, 1884.
- August Reinsdorf und die Propaganda der That (August Reinsdorf and Propaganda of the Deed). New York: self-published, 1885.
- Acht Jahre hinter Schloss und Riegel. Skizzen aus dem Leben Johann Most's. (Eight years Under Lock and Key: Sketches from the Life of Johann Most). New York: self-published, 1886.
- Die Hoelle von Blackwells Island (The Hell of Blackwells Island). New York: self-published, 1887.
- An das Proletariat (To the Proletariat). New York: J. Müller, 1887.
- Die Eigenthumsbestie (The Property Beast). New York: J. Müller, 1887. English: The Beast of Property: Total Annihilation Proposed as the Only Infallible Remedy: The Curse of the World which Defeats the People's Emancipation. New Haven, CT: International Workingmen's Ass'n, Group New Haven, n.d. [c. 1890].
- Die Gottespest (The God Pestilence), New York: J. Müller, 1887. English: The Deistic Pestilence and Religious Plague of Man, n.d. [1880s]. Reissued as The God Pestilence.
- The Accusation! A Speech Delivered by John Most, at Kramer's Hall, New York, on November 13, 1887, in Denunciation of the Judicial Butchery of the Chicago Anarchists: For Delivering Which, He Has Been Sentenced to Twelve Month's Imprisonment by Judge Cowing. London: International Publishing Co., n.d. [c. 1887].
- Vive la Commune. New York: J. Müller, 1888.
- Der Stimmkasten (The Ballot Box). New York: J. Müller, 1888.
- The Social Monster: A Paper on Communism and Anarchism. New York: Bernhard and Schenck, 1890.
- The Free Society: Tract on Communism and Anarchy. New York: J. Müller, 1891.
- Zwischen Galgen und Zuchthaus (Between Gallows and Penitentiary). New York: J. Müller, 1892.
- Anarchy Defended by Anarchists. With Emma Goldman. New York: Blakely Hall, 1896.
- Down with the Anarchists! This is the War-Cry Raised by President Roosevelt and Echoed by the Congress of the United States. Now, Then, Hear the Other Side! The Anarchists will Take the Floor. Listen!. New York: John Most, n.d. [c. 1905].
- Memoiren, Erlebtes, Erforschtes und Erdachtes (Memoirs: Experiences, Explorations, and Thoughts). In 4 volumes. New York: Selbstverlag des Verfassers, 1903–1907.

== Primary sources ==
=== Anarchist press ===
- Johann Most by La Vengeance Anarchiste (6 March 1883)

== Bibliography ==
- Goyens, Tom (2007). Beer and revolution: The German anarchist movement in New York City, 1880–1914. Champaign: University of Illinois Press. ISBN 978-0-252-03175-5.
- Nomad, Max (1961) [1939]. "The Preacher: Johann Most, Terrorist of the Word". Apostles of Revolution. New York: Collier Books. pp. 257–299. LCCN 61018566. OCLC 984463383.
- Trautmann, Frederic (1980). The Voice of Terror: A Biography of Johann Most. Westport, Connecticut: Greenwood Press. ISBN 0-313-22053-0. ISSN 0147-1066. LCCN 79-8279.

Reichstag of the German Empire
Preceded by Richard Ludwig	Reichstag Deputy for Chemnitz; 1874–1878	Succeeded by Louis Wilhelm Vopel

Media offices
Preceded by New publication	Editor of Freiheit; 1879–1881	Succeeded by Frank Kitz
Preceded by Victor Dave	Editor of Freiheit; 1884–1905	Succeeded by Helene Minkin
