= Balawaristan National Front =

Political organization in Pakistan

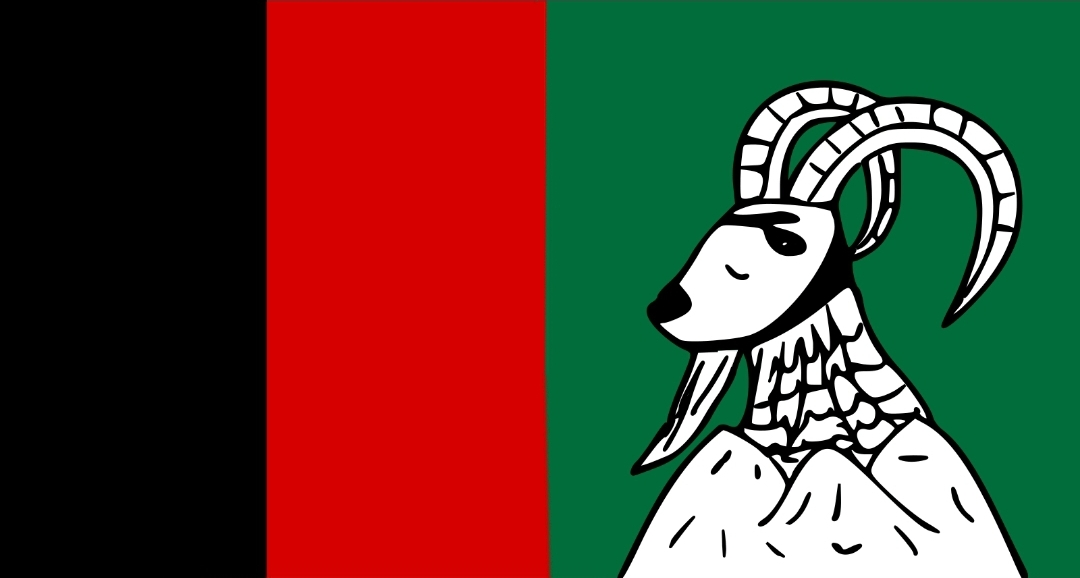
- Dissolved: 1980s
- Succeeded by: BNF (Hameed); BNF-N
- Ideology: Balawaristani nationalism

The Balawaristan National Front is a defunct political party which sought Independence for Gilgit-Baltistan, claimed as Balawaristan, as well as claims in certain regions of the Indian-Administered Kashmir, Kargil and Ladakh, as part of its historical territory.

== Background ==
Balawaristan is a historic name for the Gilgit-Baltistan region of Pakistan. The party considers Baltistan a part of Balawaristan as well. The Balawaristan National Front was formed by Abdul Hamid Khan, Mohammad Rafiq, Shujaat Ali and Nawaz Khan Naji, but has broken into two parties since then, the BNF(H) and BNF(N). This was because Abdul Hamid Khan had far more extreme views and was much more strongly nationalist than Naji, who restricted his demands to autonomy.

In 2009 as part of Gilgit-Baltistan Empowerment and Self-Governance Order, 2009, the region was granted self-rule with an elected legislature for the first time in its history, despite protests from India (which regards the region as disputed territory).

== Political positions ==
=== BNF-H ===
The BNF-H branch is a non functional branch which did not want to join India or Pakistan. In a letter dated November 24, 2004 party Chairman BNF (Hameed Group) Abdul Hamid Khan presented a peace proposal for Kashmir to President Musharraf and Manmohan Singh. This was however not accepted by any party.

On April 25, 2007 European Union published a report entitled 'on Kashmir: present situation and future prospects'. Section 2 of the noted the absence of democracy in Gilgit Baltistan region and in section 32 deplored the human rights violations in this region. Partly as a result of this, President Pervez Musharraf announced a package for the Northern Areas.

A 2-day conference on Gilgit Baltistan was held on April 8–9, 2008 at the European Parliament in Brussels under the auspices of International Kashmir Alliance. Here several members of the European Parliament (MEPs) expressed concern over the human rights violation in Gilgit Baltistan and urged the government of Pakistan to establish democratic institutions and rule of law in this area of northern Kashmir. Abdul Hamid Khan, Chairman Balawaristan National Front speaking at the same conference said "no democratically elected representative (from Gilgit Baltistan) was included when Karachi Agreement was signed between Pakistan and Muslim Conference leaders in 1949."

BNH-H was later banned by the government of Pakistan for having connections to the Indian intelligence, Research and Analysis Wing (RAW) and involvement in destabilising activities in GB, while its leader was distancing himself from the faction.

=== BNF-N ===
The Balawaristan National Front also wants to give the people of Gilgit Baltistan representation in the Pakistani National Assembly and Senate, and to extend the jurisdiction of the Supreme Court to the region.

The party is represented in the 33-seat Gilgit Baltistan Legislative Assembly by a single member, Nawaz Khan Naji.

On November 3, 2003, Nawaz Khan Najee (the party's supreme head) participated in a rally demanding United Nations intervention regarding the status of Gilgit and Baltistan.

The party later decided to field two candidates for the 33 member assembly, but neither was voted into power. However, the package, for the first time in the history of Gilgit-Baltistan, addressed the political grievances of the local population who had felt discriminated against as they were ineligible to vote in Pakistani elections (Pakistan regards the area as a disputed territory - and any attempts to incorporate the region into the Pakistani state would jeopardize its claim vis-a-vis India). The people of the region were granted self-rule, citizenship within Pakistan, and an elected legislature to administer the region.

The party fielded two candidates in the 2009 elections for the legislative assembly of Gilgit-Baltistan - though neither candidate was elected to the 33-seat assembly, which is dominated by mainstream Pakistani parties such as PPP, PML, and JUI. However, in a special by-election in 2011, BNF founder Nawaz Khan Naji won the seat from LA-22 (Ghizar-I), with 46.4% of ballots cast in his favor.

In June 2015, BNF won the elections for Ghizer District beating PML-N by 92 votes. BNF collected 5,195 votes compared to PML-N of 5,102 votes. Nawaz Khan Najee was elected the CM of District.

Later on in 2015 Gilgit Baltistan Legislative Assembly elections, Nawaz Khan Naji again won a seat in Legislative Assembly by winning from GBLA-19.

In 2017, Nawaz Khan Naji expressed support for China Pakistan Economic Corridor (CPEC).

== See also ==
- Gilgit-Baltistan United Movement
- Kashmir conflict
