= Jafaria Students Organization Pakistan =

Shiite Muslim students organisation in Pakistan

Jafaria Students Organization Pakistan جعفریہ اسٹوڈنٹس آرگنائزیشن پاکستان
- Founded: 1997
- Headquarters: Islamabad, Pakistan
- Religion: Shiite Islam
- National affiliation: Shia Ulema Council and Tehrik-e-Jafaria
- Colors: Red and Black

Website
- http://jsopakistan.org/

Jafaria Students Organization (Urdu: جعفریہ اسٹوڈنٹس آرگنائزیشن پاکستان) is a Shiite Muslim students organisation in Pakistan.it has a country wide presence.Provinces including Azad Kashmir and Gilgit-Baltistan it has "around 100 plus units in Pakistan. It's also Part of Tehrik-e-Jafaria and Shia Ulema Council in Pakistan.

== Purpose ==
The objective of the Organisation is to build the lives of the young generation in accordance with the teachings of the Quran, Prophet Muhammad and his progeny, so that they may become good and pious human beings, to defend the sanctity of the religion of Islam as well the geographical and ideological boundaries of the god gifted Pakistan.

== History ==
Jafaria Students Organization (Urdu: جعفریہ اسٹوڈنٹس آرگنائزیشن پاکستان) is a Shiite Muslim students' organisation in Pakistan. It was founded by Syed Iftikhar Hussain Naqvi and Sajid Raza Thaheem after splitting from Imamia Students Organization over differences with Maulana Syed Sajid Ali Naqvi.

== List of Central Presidents of Jafaria Students Organization Pakistan ==
List of Central Presidents of Jafaria Students Organization Pakistan
No.	Name (Birth–death)	Took office	Left office	Note(s)
1	Syed Iftikhar Hussain Naqvi	1997	1999	Syed Iftikhar Hussain Naqvi is the Founder Of Jafaria Students Organization Pakistan
2	Munwer Abbas Sajdi	1999	2000	
3	Munwar Abbas Sajdi	2000	2001	
4	Syed Gulam Sarwer Shah Naqvi	2001	2002	
5	Syed Asad Kazmi	2002	2003	
6	Munwer Abbas Sajdi	2003	2005	Munwer Abbas Sajdi is the first man to elected the 3rd time as President of Jafaria Students Organization Pakistan
7	Syed Altaf Hussain Kazmi	2006	2008	
8	Syed Azadar Hussain Naqvi	2008	2010	
9	Syed Javed Zaidi	2010	2012	
10	Sajid Ali Samar	2012	2014	
11	Wafa Abbas	2014	2016	
12	Hassan Abbas	2016	2017	
13	Ghazanfar Abbas Sajdi	2017	2018	
13	Syed Zeeshan Haider Shamsi	2018	2021	
14	Syed Rashid Hussain Naqvi	2021	2023	
15	Muhammad Akbar	2023	Present	

== See also ==
- Shia Ulema Council
- Tehreek-e-Jafaria
- Arif Hussain Hussaini
- Talib Jauhari
- Sipah-e-Muhammad Pakistan
- Imamia Students Organisation
- Majlis Wahdat-e-Muslimeen
