= Saeed Bharam =

- Born: Ahmed Saeed; February 23, 1971 (age 55)
- Status: Imprisoned
- Other name: Saeed
- Occupation: Central Leader Former Member Raabta Committee MQM-L
- Known for: MQM-L militant wing / Party leader
- Political party: MQM-P
- Convictions: Murder of Abrar Hussain Zaidi (25-year sentence, 2017)
- Criminal charges: Assassination, arson, Corruption, and terrorism
- Penalty: multiple charges pending
- Time at large: 2008-2016

Saeed Bharam (also known as Ahmed Saeed) Pakistani politician affiliated with the Muttahida Qaumi Movement, and a former member of the party's Raabta (Coordination) Committee. He is also alleged lead MQM's purported militant wing.

In March 2016, Bharam was arrested in Dubai and subsequently extradited to Pakistan. Following his return, he has been implicated in multiple cases involving allegations of orchestrating targeted killings, land grabbing, corruption, and terrorism in Karachi.

== Political involvement ==
Bharam is purported to have held a leadership position within MQM's militant apparatus, overseeing “target killing teams” allegedly directed from abroad. During a judicial statement in October 2016, he confessed that assassination orders came from London, including figures such as Altaf Hussain. He admitted to coordinating operations involving known Militants like Saulat Mirza and Ajmal Pahari.

== Arrest and extradition ==
He was arrested in March 2016 in Dubai, United Arab Emirates, and extradited to Pakistan shortly afterward. Upon arrival in Karachi, he was taken into custody by Pakistan Rangers for preventive detention.

Law enforcement later arrested his brother in Dubai and seven alleged accomplices in coordinated raids.

== Criminal charges ==
=== Targeted killing of Abrar Hussain Zaidi (2009) ===
Bharam was convicted in the high-profile murder of MQM-H activist Abrar Hussain Zaidi, who was shot dead on 1 October 2009. In June 2017, an Anti-Terrorism Court sentenced him to 25 years’ imprisonment. Bharam admitted to ordering the killing of Zaidi on the instructions of MQM leadership.

=== Tahir Plaza arson attack (2008) ===
He was also implicated in the 9 April 2008 arson attack on Tahir Plaza allegedly ordering it, which resulted in the deaths of six lawyers and civilians. Eyewitnesses later identified his accomplices as having deliberately set the blaze and fired shots inside the plaza.

=== Confessions to multiple killings & organized crime ===
Bharam confessed in May 2016 to his involvement in ordering over 50 murders, the 1997 bombing of the Garden police station, extortion, land grabbing, and politically motivated assassinations.

=== Other cases ===
He is under investigation for the murder of KESC managing director Shahid Hamid and other Karachi officials. Bharam is also allegedly linked to the 2006 assassination of Karachi Central Jail deputy superintendent Amanullah Niazi.

== Trial and convictions ==
- 2017: Sentenced to 25 years for murder of Abrar Hussain Zaidi.
- 2023–2024: Ongoing proceedings in Tahir Plaza case; eyewitness testimonies have been recorded.
- Ongoing: Multiple other cases of ordering targeted killings, land crimes, and extortion remain in court.

== See also ==
- Muttahida Qaumi Movement
- Targeted killings in Karachi
- Saulat Mirza
- Ajmal Pahari
