= Shaheed Muhammad Ali Naqvi =

Pakistani Shia leader (1952–1995)

Dr. Shaheed Syed Muhammad Ali Naqvi

Personal life
- Born: 28 September 1952 Ali Raza Abad, Lahore, Pakistan
- Died: 7 March 1995 (aged 42) Yateem Khana Chowk, Lahore
- Cause of death: Assassination (Gunshot wound)
- Resting place: Graveyard Ali Raza Abad, Lahore
- Citizenship: Pakistan
- Known for: Founder of Imamia Students Organization Pakistan
- Occupation: MBBS Doctor
- Website: register.isopakistan.org

Religious life
- Religion: Islam
- Denomination: Twelver Shia
- Founder of: Imamia Students Organization Pakistan

Shaheed Dr Syed Muhammad Ali Naqvi (28 September 1952 – 7 March 1995) was a prominent Pakistani Shia leader, medical practitioner, and community organizer from Lahore. He is widely recognized as the principal founder of the Imamia Students Organization (ISO) Pakistan, the largest student organization for Shia youth in Pakistan. He was also a key figure in the formation of Tehreek-e-Jafaria Pakistan (TJP) and a close associate of Allama Arif Hussain Hussaini. He played an instrumental role in shaping Shia student activism, anti-imperialist awareness, and socio-religious reforms in Pakistan.

== Early life and education ==
Dr. Syed Muhammad Ali Naqvi was born in Ali Raza Abad, Lahore on 28 September 1952. He received his early education in Lahore and spent parts of his childhood in East Africa, where his father served as a preacher. He completed his higher secondary education at Government College, Lahore before enrolling at King Edward Medical University, where he earned his Bachelor of Medicine, Bachelor of Surgery (MBBS) degree.

== Founding of ISO Pakistan and activism ==
On 22 May 1972, while studying at King Edward Medical College, Dr. Naqvi alongside fellow Shia students founded the Imamia Students Organization (ISO Pakistan) to unify Shia youth, promote religious literacy, and provide educational and social assistance. Under his leadership, ISO grew into a nationwide network across Pakistani universities, colleges, and schools.

He was a follower of Ruhollah Khomeini and the ideology of the Islamic Revolution, advocating for Islamic unity and social justice while organizing anti-imperialist rallies and educational workshops across the country.

== Political activism and major events ==
During his student life and medical practice, Dr. Muhammad Ali Naqvi was deeply involved in grassroots political organizing and public mobilizations in Pakistan:

- 1980 Islamabad Demonstration: In July 1980, when the Shia community organized a massive sit-in in Islamabad against the enforcement of the Zakat and Ushr Ordinance under General Zia-ul-Haq's regime, Dr. Naqvi played a crucial role on the ground in organizing logistics, student volunteers, and medical first-aid teams.
- Formation of Tehreek-e-Jafaria: Dr. Naqvi was key in connecting student activism with national religious leadership, working closely with Allama Arif Hussain Hussaini to organize political awareness rallies across Punjab and Khyber Pakhtunkhwa during the 1980s.
- Establishing Free Healthcare: Alongside political rallies, he operated healthcare clinics and free medical outreach programs in Lahore for underprivileged communities.

== Death ==
On the morning of 7 March 1995, Dr. Syed Muhammad Ali Naqvi was targeted in a sectarian ambush while traveling in his car near Yateem Khana Chowk in Lahore on his way to Sheikh Zayed Hospital. Armed assailants on motorcycles intercepted his vehicle and opened fire, instantly killing Dr. Naqvi alongside his companion and bodyguard, Muhammad Taqi. He was laid to rest in his ancestral graveyard at Ali Raza Abad,Lahore,
