= Jawad Naqvi =

Pakistani Islamic scholar (born 1952)

Allama Syed Jawad Naqvi
- سید جواد نقوی
- Naqvi in 2022

Principal of Jamia Urwa tul Wusqa
- Incumbent
- Assumed office 2005

Principal of Jamia Jafari

Personal life
- Born: 1 February 1963 (age 63) Haripur, NWFP, Pakistan
- Main interest(s): Islamic philosophy, Quranic exegesis, Islamic logic
- Notable work(s): Islam-e-Naab, Inqlab-e-Islami, Wilayat-e-Faqīh, Insan Shanasi, Afkar-e-Imam Khomeini
- Education: Qom Seminary, Iran
- Known for: Religious preaching
- Occupation: Islamic scholar, preacher
- Website: islamimarkaz.com

Religious life
- Religion: Islam
- Denomination: Twelver Shia
- Jurisprudence: Ja'fari
- Creed: Usuli

Muslim leader
- Influenced by: Muhammad Iqbal Imam Khomeini Hassan Hassanzadeh Amoli Abdollah Javadi Amoli Mufti Jafar Hussain Ayatollah Khamenei Mohammad-Taqi Mesbah-Yazdi Arif Hussain Hussaini
- Influenced: Liaqat Baloch Kamal Kharazi Zahid Ur Rashdi Abul Khair Muhammad Zubair Muhammad Ali Mirza Shehanshah Hussain Naqvi Abdul Khabeer Azad Masroor Abbas Ansari Ghulam Rasool Noori

Allama Syed Jawad Naqvi (Note: Urdu: سید جواد نقوی) (born 1963) is a Pakistani Islamic scholar, religious leader and Preacher who is the founder and chancellor of Jamia Urwat-ul-Wusqa in Lahore and many Islamic schools. A leading Shia theorist of Pakistan and worldwide, Naqvi founded the monthly religious magazine Masharab-e-Naab.

Naqvi delivers dialogue-filled sermons. He propagates theories of Wilayat-i Faqih, and is often called the representative of the Wilayat in Pakistan.

== Early life and education ==
Naqvi was born on 1 February 1963 in a Village named Thipra Syedan (ٹھپرہ سیداں) in Haripur Hazara District, Pakistan. He has studied religious philosophy, theology and Shia jurisprudence in Islamic seminaries in Pakistan and Iran. Among his teachers were Abdollah Javadi-Amoli and Mohammad-Taqi Mesbah-Yazdi.

== Career ==
Naqvi is the principal of Jamia Urwa-tul-Wusqa and Jamia Jaffria, seminaries in Lahore and Gujranwala respectively. He is also the principal of Jamia Ummul Kitaab in Lahore, head of Deen-ul-Qayyim Online Islamic school and Siraat Education School System. Naqvi is also the editor of the monthly magazine Masharab-e-Naab. He is a staunch supporter of the Islamic Revolution of Iran. In many of his speeches he propagates the hard-line version of Wilayat-i Faqih. He stands for unity of sects in Pakistan under his banner.

He has authored several works in Urdu.

=== Jamia Urwa-tul-Wusqa ===
Naqvi is the founder and principal of Islamic seminaries Jamia Urwa-tul-Wusqa, Jamia Jaffria, and Jamia Ummul-Kitab. He also runs Jamia Deen-ul-Qayim Virtual Islamic Seminary.

=== Islamic Awakening Movement ===
In 2012–2013, Naqvi led a movement to condemn blasphemy of Muhammad named ″Tehreek e Baidari e Ummat e Mustafa SAWW″, which he launched on 7 October 2012 held in Lahore.

== Views ==
In a 2012 report by Hudson Institute, he has been described as pro-Iran and to be financially supported by Iran. Alex Vatanka writes in an article titled "The Guardian of Pakistan's Shia" published by Hudson Institute, a strategic think-tank based in Washington. It says:

"Accordingly, many of Pakistan's Shia religious figures have become highly vocal and partisan supporters of Khamenei. For example, Jawad, a prominent activist preacher and the head of a recently launched Shia seminary in Pakistan, idealizes the theocracy in the Islamic Republic of Iran and calls himself a devoted follower of Khamenei. He has additionally published articles as well as a book denouncing Iran's anti-clerical Green opposition movement.27 Not surprisingly, Jawad's seminary was reportedly established in part with financial support from the Iranian state."

In 2019, an article in The News described him of having "uniquely Iran-centered career".

However, Naqvi has denied that he has received any support from Iran. In the opening ceremony of Jamia Urwatu Wusqa he said that this project is fully supported by local Pakistani people. He said that none of his projects is supported by Iran or any other country and not a single penny has been received from outside Pakistan.

As recent as January 2020, he has been described as "a major supporter of Iran's theocracy" by Foreign Policy, an American news publication.

In 2013, Mohammadi Masjid stopped Jawad's sermons after there was scuffle occurred when Police prevented Jawad's security from entering the mosque, sparking mass protests outside the mosque. Allegedly his security guard was carrying unlicensed weapon. Police accused students of Jawad, for creating the chaos and roughing up the cameraman, the varsity condemned the irresponsible behavior of the police. Subsequently, Naqvi was banned by Punjab Chief Minister Shahbaz Sharif from lecturing at Mohammadi Masjid in Lahore.

=== On Iran's system ===
Naqvi believes that Iran's system is based on Quran. This is contrary to the opinion of his teacher, Iranian Ayatollah Javadi Amoli, who said in 2018:

The interest system of our banks is a war against God and his messenger (PBUH). You may name a year as a year of production and prosperity (the Iranian leader named the previous year the Year of Resistant Economy: Production and Employment), as long as there is interest on loan in banking system, nothing will improve."

Earlier in December 2016, Javadi Amoli said, Bank of Iran sucks blood of the people.

=== On Azadari of Muharram ===
In 2020, after his alleged comparison of Azadari with Tarawih during a lecture, Indian daily and weekly Urdu newspapers Sahafat and Nauroz published articles critical to him. Indian daily and Urdu newspaper Sahafat and Hindi newspaper Bhumitra again criticised his May 29, 2020 Friday sermon, for targeting Indian Shia leadership.

In July 2020 Naqvi criticised Imamia Students Organisation for not being the pride of Guardianship of the Islamic Jurist which sparked a reaction and a resolution by Imamia Students Organization against him.

== Notable works ==
Nakvi has written several books about Islam, including:

- Islam and Secularism
- Adaab-e-Fahm-e-Quran
- Aqdar-e-Ashura
- Fitna Akhruz Zaman
- Wahdat Ummat Ka Faramoush Rukn
- Rasm-i-Shabiri
- Hussain (pbuh)-Waris-e-Anbia
- Karbala ek hi rasta

== See also ==
- Mufti Jafar Hussain
- Arif Hussain Hussaini
- Mazhar Ali Azhar
