= Syed Tasawar Jawadi =

Pakistani Shia scholar (1976–2023)

Syed Tasawar Hussain Naqvi Jawadi
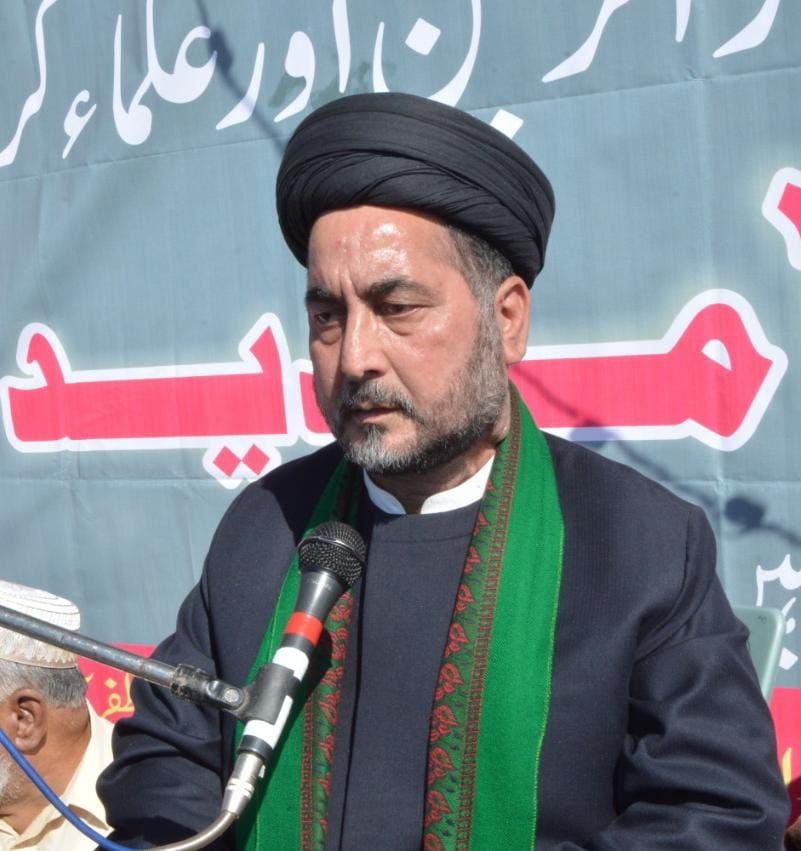
- حجةالاسلام سید تصور نقوی جوادی

Secretary General
- In office MWM
- In office 2011–2023

Member (Shia Representative)
- In office Azad Jammu & Kashmir Ulama wa Mushaikh Conclave
- In office 2022 – 2023 (Till Death)
- Official name: Syed Tasawar Jawadi

Personal life
- Born: 9 January 1976 Muzaffarabad
- Died: 13 June 2023 (aged 47) Muzaffarabad
- Cause of death: Assassination (Gunshot wound)
- Resting place: Markazi Imambargah Per Ilam Shah Bukhari Graveyard Muzaffarabad
- Home town: Muzaffarabad
- Citizenship: Pakistani-administered Azad Kashmir
- Era: 20th-century Islamic scholar
- Political party: Majlis Wahdat-e-Muslimeen
- Known for: Itihad Bain ul Muslimin
- Occupation: Islamic scholar

Religious life
- Religion: Islam
- Denomination: Twelver Shīʿā
- Founder of: Majlis Wahdat-e-Muslimeen Pakistan Azad Kashmir
- Website: https://www.mwmpak.org/

Syed Tasawar Hussain Naqvi Jawadi (Urdu: سید تصور حسین نقوی الجوادی; 9 January 1976 – 13 June 2023) was a Pakistani Shia scholar from Azad Kashmir, renowned for fostering unity among the Muslims of the region, served as the former President (Secretary General) of Majlis Wahdat-e-Muslimeen Pakistan, Azad Kashmir, Sub-Supervision Member of Imamia Students Organization Azad Kashmir Division and was a member of the Ulama Mushaikh Council of Azad Kashmir.

== Early life ==
Syed Tasawar Hussain Naqvi Jawadi was born on 9 January 1976 in a village of Muzaffarabad, Azad Kashmir. His family belongs to Naqvi branch of Syeds. Jawadi received his primary education at his hometown government primary school and later went on to Madrasa Shaheed Baqir Ul Saddar and Wifaq ul Madaris Al-Shia Pakistan where he completed his double MA.

== Positions ==
(2007) Jawadi and other Ulama and Leaders of Azad Kashmir, founded Jafferiya Ullamma Council Azad Kashmir and Jawadi was General Secretary of this party.

(2009) Tasawar Jawadi brought Majlis Wahdat-e-Muslimeen in Kashmir, laid and took the oathtakes from Raja Nasir Abbas Jafri as a Secretary General of Majlis Wahdat-e-Muslimeen Azad Jammu and Kashmir. After the completion of era of three years, Jawadi was again elected as Secretary General. He remained Secretary General four times.

(2022) He was selected as a Member of Ulama wa Mushaikh Council of Govt. of Azad Kashmir.

== Services ==
After completing his education, he started serving as a religious scholar in Terit Syedan area of Murree Tehsil, Rawalpindi. Later he came to Bagh Azad Kashmir from Terit Syedan and continued the services. In 1999, Jawadi got married and then continued religious services in different areas of Azad Kashmir. After the earthquake in 2005, he was associated with various welfare and religious parties. In 2009, he was elected as Secretary General of Majlis Wahdat Muslim Pakistan Azad Kashmir.

== Assassination ==
On February 15, 2017, a heinous attack unfolded on the Srinagar Highway in Muzaffarabad as Syed Tasawar Jawadi, a prominent advocate for Shia-Sunni unity and a symbol of peace, was ambushed by terrorists from Lashkar-e-Jhangvi while traveling with his wife. Critically injured, Tasawar Jawadi was initially treated at SKBZ-CMH Muzaffarabad before being transferred to CMH Rawalpindi for advanced medical care. Despite valiant efforts over an eight-month period, the injuries proved insurmountable.

On June 13, 2023, after years of resilience, Syed Tasawar Jawadi succumbed to his wounds, leaving behind a legacy of unity and harmony.

His funeral, a monumental event that echoed across Pakistan and Azad Kashmir, was led by Chairman Majlis Wahdat-e-Muslimeen Pakistan Raja Nasir Abbas Jafri and former Prime Minister of State of Azad Kashmir Attique Ahmed Khan. Government officials, ministers, and countless members of the public from Pakistan and Kashmir gathered to pay their respects. The funeral prayers were held with solemn reverence at the University Ground of University of Azad Jammu & Kashmir in Muzaffarabad, a testament to the indelible impact of his life’s work and vision for a united community.

== See also ==
- Majlis Wahdat-e-Muslimeen
- Imamia Students Organization
- Tehreek-e-Jafaria (Pakistan)
- Sipah-e-Muhammad Pakistan
- Raja Nasir Abbas Jafri
- Arif Hussain Hussaini
