= 2012 Rahim Yar Khan bombing =

Terrorist attack

- Location of Rahim Yar Khan District (in red) in the province of Punjab
- Location: Rahim Yar Khan, Punjab, Pakistan
- Date: 15 January 2012
- Deaths: 18
- Injuries: unknown

The 2012 Rahim Yar Khan bombing occurred on 15 January 2012, when a remote-controlled bomb exploded during a Shi'a Muslim procession in the city of Rahim Yar Khan in the southern region of Punjab province, Pakistan. Eighteen people were killed and dozens other injured, some critically, as a result of the attack.

== Attack ==
The attack was mostly likely a sectarian-motivated. The incident took place when hundreds of Shi'a Muslims were conducting a Chehlum procession to mourn and commemorate the martyrdom of Hussein bin Ali, in the Khanpur tehsil of Rahim Yar Khan district. The bomb had been planted beforehand near an electricity pylon and went off just when mourners approached a gathering square. According to an eyewitness, a loud explosion was heard when the bomb exploded, leaving debris and a cloud of dust. Many people died on the spot from the impact. Angry mourners became violent after the destruction and immediately revolted against police forces stationed near the area, demanding the culprits to be arrested. When the police failed to take control of the situation, paramilitary rangers were called in for support.

Those who were injured were quickly transported to local medical facilities such as the Shaikh Zayed Medical College Hospital. Chief Minister of Punjab Shahbaz Sharif announced a compensation of Rs. 500,000 each for the deceased victims and Rs. 100,000 each for those who were injured.

== Responsibility ==
No groups claimed responsibility for the attack. However, there were suspicions centred on the Lashkar-e-Jhangvi which has carried out several sectarian attacks before.

== Reactions ==
The bombing was condemned by President Asif Ali Zardari, Prime Minister Yousaf Raza Gillani as well as Punjab Chief Minister Shahbaz Sharif. Ansar Burney strongly condemned the incident and expressed grief over the loss of lives. Leaders of the Shi'a community, including those of Shia ulema council blamed the government for negligence. The Imamia Students Organisation also condemned the blast. Meanwhile, a local police deputy superintendent was suspended. Federal Minister of Interior Rehman Malik called for the formation of a committee to launch an investigation.

== See also ==
- Terrorist incidents in Pakistan in 2012
