= Imran Nadeem =

Pakistani politician from Gilgit-Baltistan

Imran Nadeem Shigri
- عمران ندیم

Speaker of the Gilgit-Baltistan Assembly
- Incumbent
- Assumed office 22 June 2026
- Governor: Syed Mehdi Shah
- Deputy: Malik Kifayatur Rehman
- Preceded by: Nazir Ahmed

Member of the Gilgit Baltistan Assembly
- Incumbent
- Assumed office 22 June 2026
- Preceded by: Raja Azam Khan Amacha
- Constituency: GBA-12 Shigar
- In office 24 June 2015 – 23 June 2020
- Preceded by: Raja Azam Khan Amacha
- Succeeded by: Raja Azam Khan Amacha

Member of the Northern Areas Legislative Council
- In office 1999–2004
- In office 2004–2009

Personal details
- Born: Gulab Pur Shigar
- Party: Pakistan Peoples Party
- Other political affiliations: Tehreek-e-Jafaria (Pakistan) (1999-2002); Pakistan Muslim League (Q) (2002-2009)
- Profession: Lawyer Politician

Imran Nadeem is a Pakistani politician who has been the Speaker of the Gilgit-Baltistan Assembly since 22 June 2026. He has also been a member of the Assembly since June 2026, and previously served in this role from June 2015 to June 2020.

== Political career ==
Nadeem was elected to the Northern Areas Legislative Council from as a candidate of Tehreek-e-Jafaria Pakistan (TJP) in the November 1999 elections.

He was re-elected to the NALC as a candidate of Pakistan Muslim League (Q) (PML(Q)) in the October 2004 elections.

Nadeem contested the 2009 Gilgit-Baltistan Assembly election from GBA-12 Skardu-VI as a candidate of Pakistan People's Party (PPP), but was unsuccessful. He received 8,791 votes and was defeated by Raja Azam Khan Amacha, a candidate of Muttahida Qaumi Movement (MQM).

He was elected to the Gilgit-Baltistan Assembly from GBA-12 Skardu-VI as a candidate of PPP in the 2015 Gilgit-Baltistan Assembly election. He received 10,422 votes and defeated Raja Azam Khan Amacha, a candidate of Pakistan Muslim League (N) (PML(N)).

He contested the 2020 Gilgit-Baltistan Assembly election from GBA-12 Shigar as a candidate of PPP, but was unsuccessful. He received 8,714 votes and was defeated by Raja Azam Khan Amacha, a candidate of Pakistan Tehreek-e-Insaf (PTI).

He was re-elected to the Gilgit-Baltistan Assembly from GBA-12 Shigar as a candidate of PPP in the 2026 Gilgit Baltistan Assembly election. He received 13,222 votes and defeated Raja Azam Khan Amacha, a candidate of Islami Tehreek Pakistan (ITP).

On 22 June 2026, he took oath as a member of the Assembly, and on the same day, was elected unopposed to office of Speaker.
