= Shehanshah Hussain Naqvi =

Pakistani Twelver Shia Scholar

Syed Shehanshah Hussain Naqvi
- سید شہنشاہ حسین نقوی
- Title: Hujjat-ul-Islam Wal Muslimeen

Personal life
- Born: 1974 (age 51–52)
- Other names: Arabic: السيد شهنشاه الحسين النقوي; Persian: سید شهنشاه حسین نقوی

Religious life
- Religion: Islam
- Denomination: Shīʿa
- School: Ithnā‘ashariyyah

Muslim leader
- Based in: Karachi, Pakistan

Allama Syed Shehanshah Hussain Naqvi (Urdu: علامہ سید شہنشاہ حسین نقوی) is a Pakistani Shia scholar.

== Education ==
Syed Shehanshah Hussain Naqvi received his Islamic education from Qom, Iran.

== Unity of the Islamic world ==
Syed Shehanshah Hussain Naqvi has underlined the need for the Muslims to forge unity, putting aside their differences to successfully fail the agendas of imperialist forces. He has emphasized the need for unity and fraternity among Sunni-Shia Muslims.

== Views ==
=== Political views ===
Syed Shehanshah Hussain Naqvi has said that the message of Hussainiyat the path of Imam Hussain ibne Ali is the headspring of freedom, independence, and peace. He supports the liberty of Kashmir and Palestine, and says that international organizations must play their role in stopping atrocities in Kashmir, Palestine, Bahrain, Yemen, Syria, Qateef, Afghanistan, Nigeria, and Rohingya. He believes no oppression can succeed against the spirit of Karbala, and that the oppressed will always be victorious. He claims that terrorism, injustice, corruption and obscenity are all un-Islamic forms of Yazeediyat and can be confronted by carrying the flag of Hussainiyat.

=== On extremism ===
Syed Shehanshah Hussain Naqvi was one of the Islamic scholars who openly condemned and spoke against terrorists and terrorism when it was at its peak in Pakistan and most Islamic scholars were reluctant to speak about it. He took a stance and urged the Government to crush every terrorist network

== Majalis in Pakistan ==
Syed Shehanshah Hussain Naqvi addresses many majalis every year in Pakistan. During the first ashra (10 days) of Muharram he addresses different majalis in Karachi. The prominent majalis of 1st ashra of Muharram in Karachi are:

- Nishtar Park
- Masjid e Babul Ilm
- Imam Bargah Baqiyat Ullah
- Aza Khana Zehra (s.a)
- Ali Muttaqi Jafri House (Mehfil e Shah e Shaheedan or Imambargah Shah e Shaheedan)
- Masjid e Imam E Zamana A.S Sindh University Jamshoro

== Majalis in foreign countries ==
Naqvi also addresses majalis worldwide Shia communities in different countries including India, United States, UK, Canada, Australia, Netherland and Italy etc.

== Political interactions ==
He talks about the responsibilities of a religious leader based on sayings of Imam Ali (AS).

Naqvi met with Prime Minister Imran Khan on 3 October 2019 in the Prime Minister Secretariat, Islamabad.

== See also ==
- Arif Hussain Hussaini
- Mufti Jafar Hussain
- Talib Jauhari
- Shia Ulema Council
- Syed Ali Raza Rizvi
- Allama Syed Tasawar Jawadi
- Majlis Wahdat-e-Muslimeen
