= Hassan Turabi =

Hassan Turabi is the name of:

- Allama Hassan Turabi (1940–2006), Pakistani cleric
- Hassan Al-Turabi (1932–2016), Sudanese political leader
