= Tissar =

- Village
- Tissar
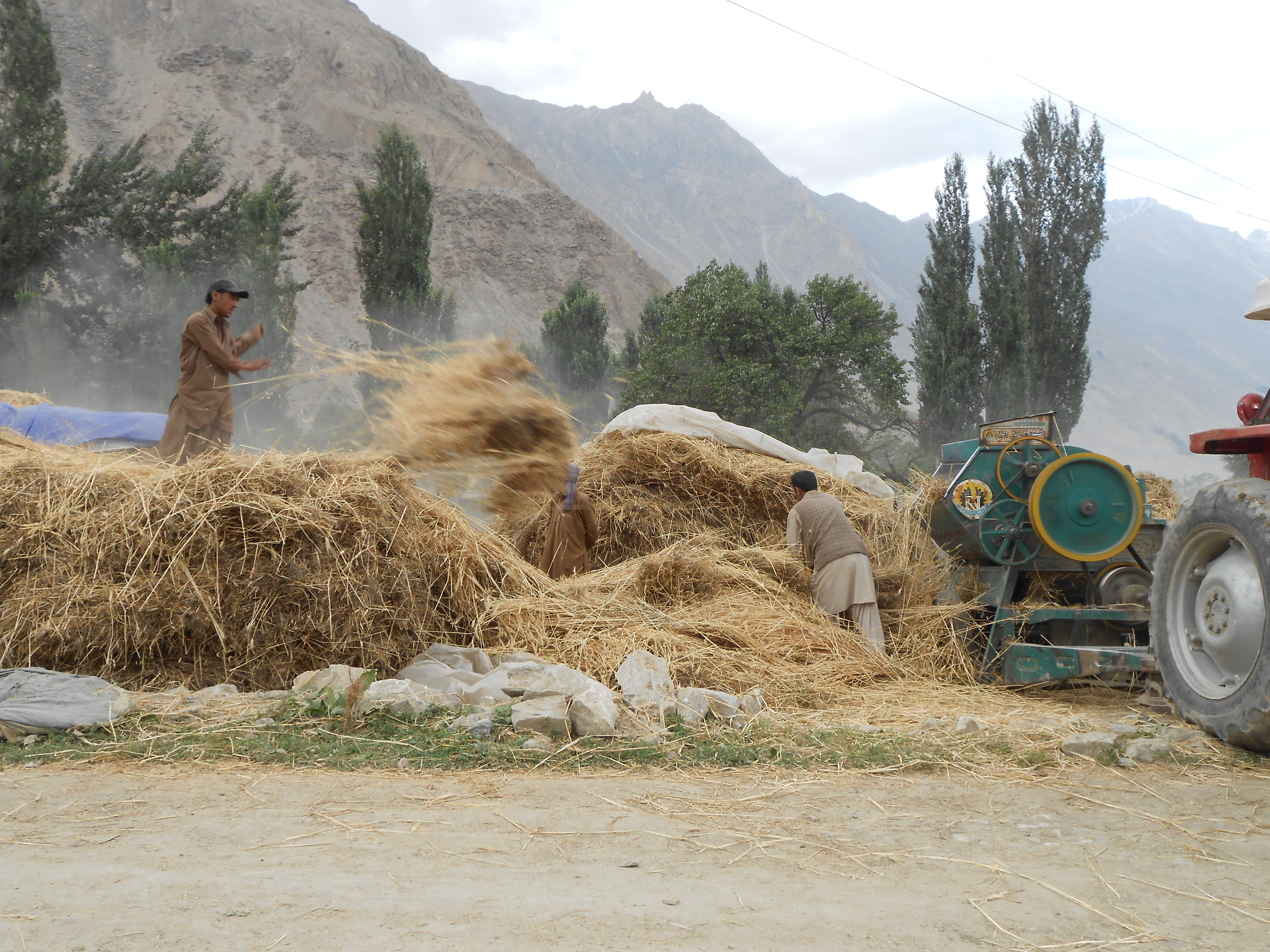
- Scenic view of Tissar During Harvesting Season
- Interactive map of Tissar
- Coordinates: 35.66773949381583°N 75.45261302542706°E
- Country: Pakistan
- Territory: Gilgit-Baltistan
- Division: Baltistan Division
- District: Shigar District
- Tehsil: Tissar Tehsil
- Time zone: UTC+5 (Pakistan Standard Time)
- Postal code: 16300
- Area code: 05815

Tissar (Urdu: تسر) is a village located in the Shigar District of Gilgit-Baltistan, Pakistan. Situated on the left bank of the Shigar River, it is approximately 72 kilometers from Skardu City. The village is part of the Shigar Valley, which stretches about 170 kilometers from Skardu to Askole and serves as a gateway to the high mountains of the Karakoram, including K2.

Tissar is located at an altitude of 7,793 feet above sea level. There are several government establishments including Tehsil office, Post Office, police station, a ten-bed hospital, two High Schools, and a Nadra office.

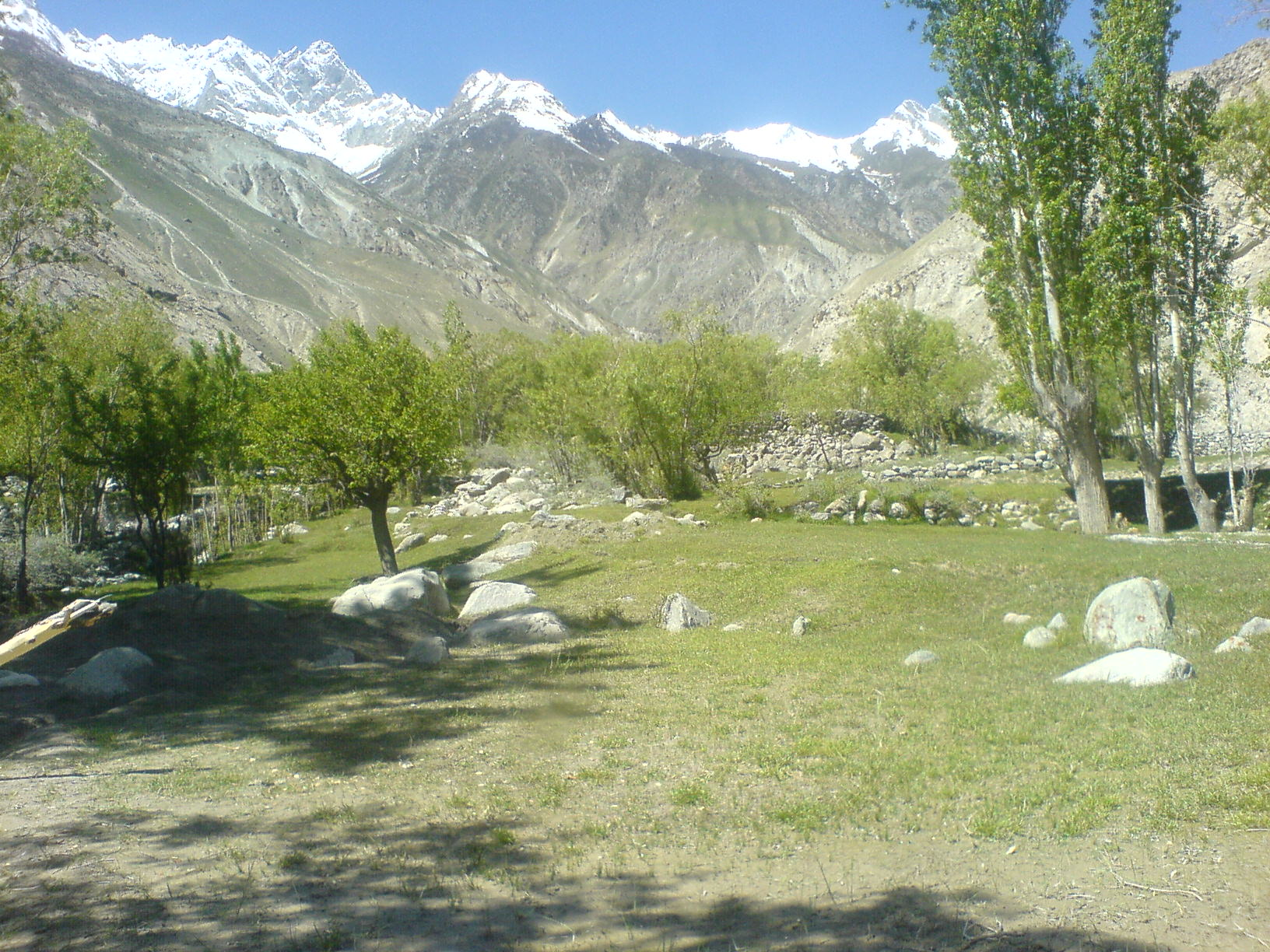

== Geography ==
Tissar is located in the Shigar Valley, surrounded by mountains.

The Chhotrun hot spring is located seven kilometers from Tissar.

=== Towns ===
- Payucho
- Multo
- Lagaf
- Thamacho
- GapKhur (Main)
- Qayimabad
- Arincho

== Education ==
Tissar is the main town of Tissar Tehsil of district Shigar. Tissar town is adequately equipped with education institutes. There is one high school for boys and one for girls. Govt boys high school tissar was established during the 1980s.

== Politics ==
Tissar is an administrative tehsil of shigar district and part of GBLA 12 Shigar in Gilgit Baltistan Assembly.

== Religion ==
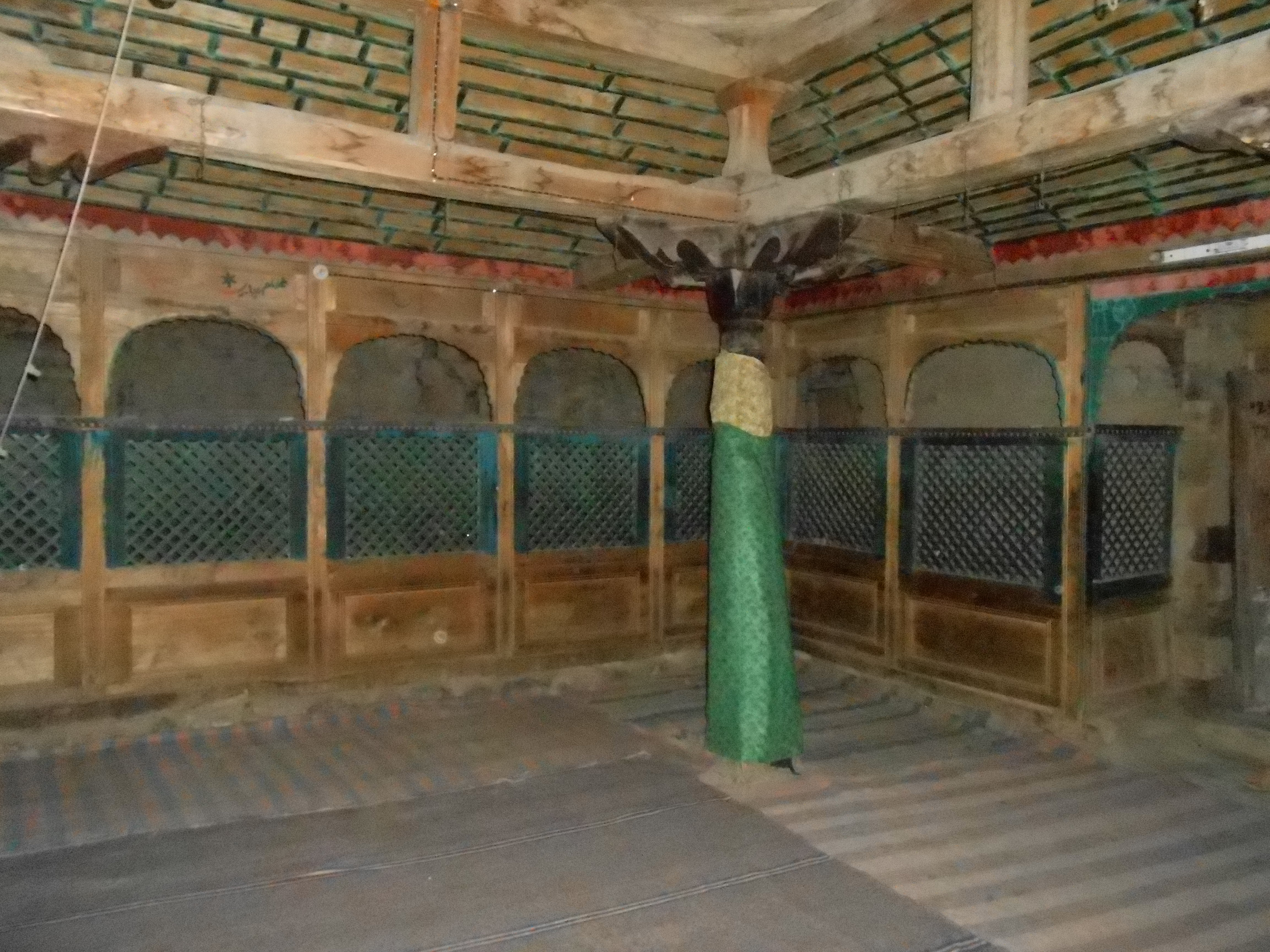

The town is predominantly inhabited by Shia Muslims, specifically adherents of the Twelver branch of Shia Islam. In 2015, five individuals from outside the region were arrested in Tissar on allegations of involvement with banned organizations.

== Culture and heritage ==
The village of Qaimabad, within Tissar, is home to Masjid-e-Zehra, a mosque with a square plan and verandahs on two sides. Constructed using timber and stone, it reflects the traditional architectural style of the region.

== Recent events ==
In July 2023, Muhammad Hassan, a porter from Tissar, died during an expedition on K2. His body was retrieved from the mountain and airlifted by a Pakistan Army helicopter to Dassu, near his village, in a rescue mission.

== Government infrastructure ==
- Police Station Tissar
- Govt Boys High School Tissar
