= Raja Azam Khan Amacha =

Pakistani politician from Gilgit-Baltistan

- راجا اعظم خان اماچا

Head of the House of Amacha
- Incumbent
- Assumed office 12 December 2021
- Preceded by: Raja Muhammad Ali Shah Saba

Member of the Gilgit Baltistan Assembly
- In office 25 November 2020 – 24 November 2025
- Preceded by: Imran Nadeem
- Constituency: GBA-12 Shigar
- In office 10 December 2009 – 9 December 2014
- Succeeded by: Imran Nadeem
- Constituency: GBA-12 Skardu-VI

Minister for Education Gilgit-Baltistan
- In office 30 November 2020 – 4 July 2023
- Governor: Raja Jalal Hussain Maqpoon; Syed Mehdi Shah
- Chief Minister: Khalid Khurshid

Personal details
- Born: Shigar Fort
- Party: ITP (2026-present)
- Other political affiliations: PTI (2018-2025); PMLN (2015-2018); MQM-L (2009-2014)
- Parent: Raja Muhammad Ali Shah Saba (father)
- Cabinet: Gilgit Baltistan Cabinet
- Website: rajaazamkhan.com

Raja Azam Khan Amacha is a Pakistani politician and had been a member of the Gilgit Baltistan Assembly from November 2020 to November 2025 and from December 2009 to December 2014. He became Head of the ruling family of the former princely state of Shigar after the death of his father Raja Muhammad Ali Shah Saba. He was the Pakistan Tehreek-e-Insaf (PTI) candidate for the position of Chief Minister of Gilgit-Baltistan.

== Political career ==
Amacha contested the 2009 Gilgit-Baltistan Assembly Election from GBA-12 Skardu-VI as a candidate of the Muttahida Qaumi Movement (MQM). He won the election with a margin of 1,753 votes over the runner-up Imran Nadeem of the Pakistan People's Party (PPP). He garnered 10,606 votes while Nadeem received 8,852 votes.

He contested the 2015 Gilgit-Baltistan Assembly Election from GBA-12 Skardu-VI as a candidate of the Pakistan Muslim League (N) (PML(N)) but was unsuccessful. He received 9,930 votes and lost to Imran Nadeem, a candidate of the PPP.

He contested the 2020 Gilgit-Baltistan Assembly election from GBA-12 Shigar as a candidate of the Pakistan Tehreek-e-Insaf (PTI). He won the election by a margin of 1,788 votes over the runner-up Imran Nadeem of the PPP. He garnered 10,674 votes while Nadeem received 8,886 votes.

On 5 July 2023, Amacha became the PTI's candidate for the position of the Chief Minister of Gilgit-Baltistan, which became vacant due to the disqualification of Khalid Khurshid, the previous Chief Minister.

His party membership was terminated on 8 September 2025.

He contested the 2026 Gilgit Baltistan Assembly election from GBA-12 Shigar as a candidate of Islami Tehreek Pakistan (ITP), but was unsuccessful. He received 8,977 votes and was defeated by Imran Nadeem, a candidate of PPP.
