= GBA-12 Shigar =

Constituency for the Gilgit Baltistan Assembly

- Constituency for the Gilgit Baltistan Assembly
- District: Shigar District
- Electorate: 30,402

Current constituency
- Created: 2009
- Party: Pakistan People's Party
- Member: Imran Nadeem
- Created from: GBA-12 Skardu-VI

GBA-12 Shigar-I is a constituency of Gilgit Baltistan Assembly. It is represented by Imran Nadeem of Pakistan People's Party.

== Members ==
Election	Member	Party	Votes received
2009	Raja Muhammad Azam Khan	Muttahida Qaumi Movement	5,039 votes
2015	Imran Nadeem	Pakistan Peoples Party	10,422 votes
2020	Raja Muhammad Azam Khan	Pakistan Tehreek-e-Insaf	10,621 votes
2026	Imran Nadeem	Pakistan Peoples Party	13,222 votes

== Election results ==
=== 2009 ===
Raja Muhammad Azam Khan of MQM became member of assembly by getting 10,520 votes. It was the only seat won by MQM in the 2009 election.

2015: Skardu-VI
Party	Candidate	Votes	%
MQM	Raja Muhammad Azam Khan	10,520	54.40
PPP	Imran Nadeem	8,818	45.59
Turnout		19,338	54.90
MQM win (new seat)			

=== 2015 ===
Imran Nadeem of PPP won this seat by getting 10,422 votes. It is only seat won by Peoples Party in the 2015 elections.

2015: Skardu-VI
Party	Candidate	Votes	%
PPP	Imran Nadeem	10,422	46.05
PML-N	Raja Azam Khan	9,930	43.88
MWM	Dr Muhammad Ali	2,183	9.65
PAT	Abid Hussain	97	0.43
Turnout		22,632	74.44
PPP gain from MQM		Swing	

=== 2020 ===
Raja Azam Khan Amacha of PTI won this seat by getting 10,621 votes.

2020: GBA-12 Shigar
Party	Candidate	Votes	%
PTI	Raja Azam Khan Amacha	10,621	
PPP	Imran Nadeem	8,919	
PML N	Muhammad Tahir	5,433	
PML Q	Muhammad Hassan	488	
Turnout			
PTI gain from PPP		Swing	

=== 2026 ===
General elections were held on 7 June 2026. Imran Nadeem, a candidate of Pakistan People's Party (PPP), won the election with 13,222 votes.

Election 2026: GBA-12 Shigar
Party	Candidate	Votes	%	±%
PPP	Imran Nadeem	13,222	42.53	
ITP	Raja Azam Khan Amacha	8,977	28.87	
PML(N)	Muhammad Tahir Unhar Shigri	6,298	20.26	
MWM	Muhammad Saeed	1,365	4.39	
PTI	Muhammad Hassan (Note: PTI members who contested in the general election ran as independent candidates aligned with the party because the Election Commission Gilgit-Baltistan prohibited the PTI election symbol.)	654	2.10	
Independent	Mehdi Ali	348	1.12	
Others	Others (four candidates)	228	0.73	
Valid ballots		31,092	98.20	
Rejected ballots		571	1.80	
Turnout		31,663	67.96	
Majority		4,245	13.65	
Registered electors		46,594		
PPP gain from PTI				
