= Arif Hussain Hussaini =

Pakistani politician

Arif Hussain al-Hussaini
- عارف حسين الحسينى

1st Leader of Tehrik-e-Jafaria Pakistan
- In office 29 August 1983 – 5 August 1988
- Preceded by: Mufti Jafar Hussain
- Succeeded by: Syed Sajid Ali Naqvi

Personal details
- Born: Syed Arif Hussain Hussaini; 25 November 1946 Parachinar, North-West Frontier Province, British India
- Died: 5 August 1988 (aged 41) Peshawar, North-West Frontier Province, Pakistan
- Manner of death: Assassination (gunshot wounds)
- Resting place: Allama Hussaini shrine, Peiwar Pass
- Party: Tehrik-e-Jafaria
- Children: 4
- Parent: Fazal Hussain Shah (father)
- Education: Madrasah-e-Jafaria
- Alma mater: Qom Seminary
- Profession: Revolutionary; Religious leader; Politician
- Ethnicity: Pashtun
- Tribe: Turi
- Title: Safeer-e-Inqilab-e-Islami; Shaheed-e-Millat-e-Jafaria; Khomanei-e-Pakistan
- Main interest(s): Islamic philosophy, Political Islam, hadith studies, Kifayat al-Usul, Guardianship of the Islamic Jurist, Uṣūl al-Fiqh, Tafsīr, Nahj al-Balagha
- Notable idea(s): Khomeinism, Wilayat al Faqih, Islamic Government
- Notable work(s): Leading the influence of Khomeinist Iranian Revolution in Pakistan; Islamic revival of Ja'fari school of Islamic jurisprudence in the Shia population of Pakistan.; Hussaini has written several books about Islam, including: Aabad e Karwan; Piyam e Noor

Religious life
- Denomination: Twelver Shīʿā
- Jurisprudence: Ja'fari
- Creed: Usuli
- Movement: Islamic revivalism

Senior posting
- Influenced by: Ruhollah Khomeini, Muhammad Hussain Najafi, Morteza Motahhari, Musa al-Sadr, Muhammad Husayn Tabataba'i, Ja'far al-Sadiq, Ayatollah Madani, Ayatollah Mortazavi, and Sheikh Ashraf Asphahani.
- Influenced: Syed Sajid Ali Naqvi, Allama Syed Jawad Naqvi, Allama Syed Shehanshah Naqvi, Muhammad Nawaz Irfani, Raja Nasir Abbas Jafri, Talib Jauhari, Allama Tasawar Jawadi

Arif Hussain Al Hussaini (Urdu: علامہ عارف حسين الحسينى; 25 November 1946 – 5 August 1988) was a Twelver Shīʿā Muslim scholar, Islamist ideologue, Islamic jurist, and Islamic revolutionary political leader of Shia Muslims in Pakistan. He is also known as Khomeini-e-Pakistan for his activities, which earned him the reputation of being one of the most prominent advocates for the Shia population of Pakistan and Islamic revival of the Ja'fari school of Islamic jurisprudence in the country. He condemned the ideas of secularism, liberalism and communism, which he understood to be the influence of Western and Soviet imperialism. He was assassinated in 1988 at aged 41.

== Family background and education ==
=== Family background ===
Allama Syed Arif Hussain al-Hussaini was born on 25 November 1946 in the village of Pewar, Kurram, Parachinar into the house of Fazal Hussain Shah. His family belongs to the Husseini branch of Syeds, which trace descent to the fourth Shi'a Imam, Zayn al-‘Ābidīn. The specific local branch name was Duparzai. He was fluent in Pashto, Dari, Urdu, Persian and Arabic.

=== Education ===
Hussaini received his primary education from his hometown state primary school and later went on to Parachinar to complete his matriculation. Later, he was admitted to the Madrasa Jafria Parachinar from where he went to the Iraqi city of Najaf for further studies. In Iraq, he studied under figures such as Aqai Lashkarani, Ayatollah Khomeini, Ayatollah Madani, Ayatollah Mortazavi, and Sheikh Ashraf Asphahani. In 1973, he returned home and married, and a year later went to the holy city of Qom, Iran to join the Hawza 'Ilmiyya. In 1975 and 1977, he performed the Hajj.

=== Najaf Period ===
After staying for a while in Parachinar Madrasa in 1967, Allama Arif ul Hussain al-Hussaini decided to further his religious studies and with his teacher Maulana Ghulam Hussain departed for Najaf where he met Imam Khomeini and many Shia religious figures in Iraq. “Madrasa Abdul Aziz Baghdadi" was where he began his early further Islamic education, then Hussaini was admitted to “Madrasa-e Shabbiriah." While Hussaini was studying in Najaf, Imam Khomeini also lived there in exile. Imam Khomeini used to lead maghribayn prayers at the Madrasa of Ayatollah Burujerdi in Najaf at a time when very few of his followers used to pray behind him due to the surveillance of Saddam's regime. Hussaini was the only Pakistani who came every evening to pray behind him. Because of this attachment to Imam Khomeini he was ordered to leave Najaf by Iraqi authorities, but before Hussaini left Iraq Khomeini gave him his Wikalat Nama, (a letter issued by a Marja to a student to issue fatwas and collect khums in his name).

=== Return to Pakistan ===
Hussaini returned to Pakistan in 1977 to mobilize the Shia community. That year, he became the first person to recite a majlis in Pashto, which is unusual given that the vast majority of Pashtuns are Sunni rather than Shia but indicates his stance as a strong promoter of Shia-Sunni unity. He also leveraged funding from the Shia Pakistani diaspora in the Persian Gulf to create the Alamdar Foundation in his hometown of Parachinar.

== Leadership of Tehrik-e-Jafaria Pakistan ==
In a meeting of 28 people called in Bhakkar, Punjab, Allama Syed Arif Hussain Al Hussaini was given the leadership of Tehrik-e-Jafaria Pakistan (TJP), five months after the death of Mufti Jafar Hussain on 10 February, 1984, in Bhakkar. An ideological split divided the movement into two groups: one headed by Hamid Moosavi, the follower of Ayatollah Shariatmadari; the other headed by Hussaini, the follower of Khomeini’s teachings. Under Hussaini, the party began to accept Sunni members, but it remained a Shia religious organisation. In 1986 Allama Syed Arif Hussain al-Hussaini and his party welcomed Ayatollah Sayyid Ali Khamenei to congratulate him on the success of Iran's Islamic revolution during his three-day visit to Pakistan. As leader of Tehrik-e-Jafaria Pakistan (TJP), Allama Syed Arif Hussain Al Hussaini founded and revived many Pakistani Shia organizations, including schools and charities, and continued to advocate for Muslim unity throughout his life, uniting them under one banner. He also organized the Quran-O-Sunnat Conference in 1987 alongside Sunni Scholars to convey the message of Islamic unity and Iran's Islamic revolution, It was attended by majority people of different sects from all over Pakistan. In 1988 following the assassination of Allama Syed Arif Hussain al- Hussaini the Supreme Council of Shiite clergy of Pakistan elected the Allama Syed Sajid Ali Naqvi as the leader of Tehrik-e-Jafaria Pakistan (TJP).

== Support for Iran during Iran-Iraq war ==
As The leader of Tehrik-e-Jafaria Pakistan (TJP), Allama Syed Arif Hussain Al Hussaini who was a former student and devotee of Ayatollah Khomeini and drawing inspiration from Iran, He sought to establish a sphere of influence by leveraging his connections within Pakistan, along with the favourable conditions and broader ideological climate created by the Iranian Revolution, Within Pakistani madrasahs, Hussaini promoted pro-Iranian revolutionary ideology through the madrasahs, encouraged students to pursue education in Iran, and worked to import Iran’s revolutionary model into Pakistan. He also aimed to spearhead efforts to transfer Iran’s revolutionary ideology into Pakistan, During the Iran–Iraq War (1980–1988), many Pakistani Shias (mainly TJP members) volunteered to fight against Saddam regime in Iraq for Iran under the guidance and leadership of Hussaini.

== Death ==
Allama Syed Arif Hussain al-Hussaini was assassinated in Peshawar on 5 August 1988 at the time of Fajr prayer. He was at the stairs of his seminary, coming down from his residence on the first floor, when two assailants opened fire on him. The assassins of Hussaini managed to escape but later twere reportedly arrested by the security forces. The attackers were allegedly affiliated with Sipah-e-Sahaba, an anti-Shia organization in Pakistan. Hussaini died of his wounds while being transported by ambulance to a local hospital. Hussaini’s death sparked a riot by around 500 supporters who threw stones at cars and buses in the eastern city of Lahore before riot police dispersed them with tear gas.

His body was taken from Peshawar to his native village of Peiwar by helicopter. The former President Zia-ul-Haq and special representatives of Imam Khomeini, Ayatullah Jannati, participated in his funeral rites. The Iranian government supported the construction of a mazar over his grave in Peshawar.

=== Alleged Involvement of Zia-ul-Haq ===
It is alleged that President Zia-ul-Haq was also involved in the assassination of Allama Syed Arif Hussain Al-Hussaini. Hussaini had been a staunch critic of the Zia regime and had opposed its Islamization policies. He claimed that the so-called Islamization policies of Zia benefitted America and its allies instead of Islam and Pakistan, and believed that Zia's policies could foment a regional sectarian conflict in the future. Shortly after the CIA-led Operation Cyclone, Hussaini openly voiced opposition to the Zia regime for supporting American-Israeli interference in the region and criticized the Soviet Union for destabilizing the region; however, he stated that Pakistan would continue to support the Afghan mujahideen against Soviet forces in Afghanistan without the help of America and its allies because he believed that Pakistan's collaboration with America and its allies was akin to betraying Palestine and vowed to organize against Zia-ul-Haq and his martial law. However, efforts to form a coalition against the regime were cut short by his assassination on 5 August 1988 at the hands of suspected Sipah-e-Sahaba assailants. Many of his colleagues believe that the Zia-ul-Haq government was also involved in the assassination of Hussaini, calling it a pre-planned murder because at that time Sipah-e-Sahaba was openly supported by the Zia regime. Scholars speculate that the popularity and influence of Allama Syed Arif Hussain al-Hussaini among Pakistani Muslims caused the Zia regime and CIA to coordinate his assassination to prevent an Iran-style Islamic Revolution, as he was commonly referred to as "Safeer-e-Inqilab-e-Islami" (ambassador of Islamic Revolution) by his followers.

== See also ==
- Mufti Jafar Hussain
- Muhammad Hussain Najafi
- Muhammad Nawaz Irfani
- Sheikh Rajab Ali
- Sheikh Ali Madad
- Sheikh Fida Hussain Muzahiri
