= Moosavi Peace Formula =

1997 Pakistani terrorism addressing plan

The Moosavi Peace Formula is a Pakistani plan to address the threat of terrorism that was put forth in 1997.

== History ==
In 1997, the Chief Justice of the Supreme Court of Pakistan Syed Sajjad Ali Shah took suo-moto notice and asked for suggestions for curbing terrorism. A high level delegation of Tehreek e Nifaz e Fiqah Jafariya (TNFJ) led by the then Vice President Allama Taajud Din Haidery met with the Ali Shah on 21 August 1997 and presented its anti-terrorism/peace formula, recommended by TNFJ chief Agha Syed Hamid Ali Shah Moosavi. Almost all the steps recommended in the formula were adopted by the Government of Pakistan’s anti-terrorism policies. Plans such as National Internal Security Policy (NISP 2014-2018) and the National Action Plan (Pakistan) (NAP) are among the examples. Moosavi Peace Formula also received significant amount of coverage and discussion mostly in the national print media including Daily Jang and Daily Nawa-e-Waqt of 22 August while Daily Dawn of 23 August 1997 besides others.

The Moosavi Peace Formula included a detailed account of the origins and root causes of terrorism. It also presented a detailed strategy and steps required to eradicate terrorism from Pakistan. This formula was presented to the Supreme Court by TNFJ leaders Allama Taj-ud-Din Haideri, Syed Mazhar ALi Shah Advocate, Syed Shujaat Ali Bukhari, Allama Qamar Zaidi and Allama Saqlain Bukhari.

== Major points ==
=== Root causes ===
- International Colonial Powers' fear related to Pakistan which leads them punishing Pakistan.
- India never accepted the existence of Pakistan and takes advantage of incidents occurring in occupied Kashmir.
- Activities of foreign secret agencies
- Distraction from the national issues, specifically the nuclear capability and Kashmir issue
- Illegal settlement of foreigners
- Different sections occupied by elements representing feudalism and dictatorship.
- Flourishing cultures of Ignorance, illiteracy, unemployment, Kalashnikov and drugs heroin
- Sectarian and linguistic groups finding shelter in government and opposition parties.
- Basing electoral politics on sectarian or linguistic discrimination.
- Media coverage of the religious and language extremists.
- Foreign funding of religious and political parties
- Appointments of incompetent people in civil administration.
- Confrontation between government and opposition.
- Hypocritical policies of politicians.

=== Key Recommendations ===
- Government must avoid begging from international colonial powers.
- Pakistan’s founding ideology must be presented to explain that Islam is a complete code of life, it ensures protection of human rights for all sections including minorities while considers all kinds of oppression as major sin.
- Government trying to have friendly relations with India, must demand from India to stop intervening in Pakistan and resolve the issue of Kashmir in accordance with the wishes of Kashmiris and United Nations resolutions.
- Government of Pakistan must protest to the home governments of the foreign agencies involved in creating unrest in Pakistan.
- Government must clarify to the world that Pakistan’s nuclear capability is aimed at strengthening Pakistan, while the issue of Kashmir is not only a problem of Pakistan but the entire Muslim Ummah therefore, Islamic world must pay attention to Kashmir issue. The Organisation of Islamic Cooperation (OIC) must be informed that Pakistan is being illegitimately punished on this issue and that the Islamic world must urge India in this regard. Government and opposition must adopt a joint strategy on Kashmir issue.
- Illegally settled foreigners must be deported to their homelands.
- Elements representing feudalism and dictatorship must be expelled from electoral politics for ten years.
- Bold and practical steps must be taken to resolve core issues including poverty, unemployment and insecurity.
- Government and opposition must demonstrate courage and separate themselves from the religio-political and sectarian groups participating in electoral politics.
- Government must ban participating in electoral politics on religious, sectarian or linguistic basis as it is devastating for the country. An anti-sectarian bill declare that Sunni and Shia are the established sects of Islam and calling any of them non-Muslim or attacking their worship places must be considered as an attack on Islam (Sha’air e Islam) and treated as a crime deserving punishment. Furthermore, all schools of thought must act in accordance with their ideologies and must not intervene in one another.
- Electronic and Print media must stop offering media coverage to extremist elements so that such elements can be discouraged.
- Foreign funding to religious and political parties operating in Pakistan must be protested against at diplomatic fronts. The Government must investigate how exactly some elements shifted overnight from extreme poverty to excessive richness. In this regard, Tehreek e Nifaz e Fiqah Jafariya (TNFJ) voluntarily presents itself for audit.
- Civil administration must be purified: justice and fair play must prevail.
- Government and Opposition must operate within their boundaries and demonstrate courage to respect and tolerate each other.
- Rulers and politicians must avoid hypocrisy. People of Pakistan must rely upon Almighty Allah only and condemn extremist and terrorist groups.

=== Hate material ===
The government banned several religious books, however the ban was mainly imposed based on complaints received against any book and law enforcement lacked a proper justification to declare a violation of the hate material law. The Moosavi peace formula also proposed comprehensive criteria and well-defined guidelines to declare any script as a violation. Guidelines and recommendations presented in this regard include:

- Fundamental books of any sect (including the Quran’s translations and interpretations) must be exempted from the ban.
- Books that mention the sayings and quotes of Mohammed and his Ahl-e-Bait must not be banned.
- Basic books of history such as Hayat ul Qaloob, Jilaa ul Ayoon, Anwar un Nomaniya must not be banned.
- Books written before partition must not be banned to avoid sectarian rifts.
- Any book written in response to another book must not be banned without banning the book to which it responds.
- Books written after 1977 to aggravate sectarianism can be banned. However, banning books that were written centuries ago cannot be justified.
- Punishment for the crime of disrespecting Mohamed should be permanent.
- In Fiqah Jafariya, the punishment of disrespecting Ahl-e-Bait is the death penalty.
- Some groups demanded to impose the death penalty. However, none of the courts during the eras of Mohamed or his companions announced death punishment for such cases.

== Other sources ==
- Daily Nawa-e-Waqt (Islamabad Edition, 22 August 1997)
- Daily Dawn (23 August 1997)
- Daily Jang Rawalpindi Edition, 22 August 1997)
