= Syed Hamid Ali Shah Moosavi =

Pakistani Islamic scholar (1936–2022)

Agha Syed Hamid Ali Shah al-Moosavi
- آغا سید حامد علی شاہ موسوی
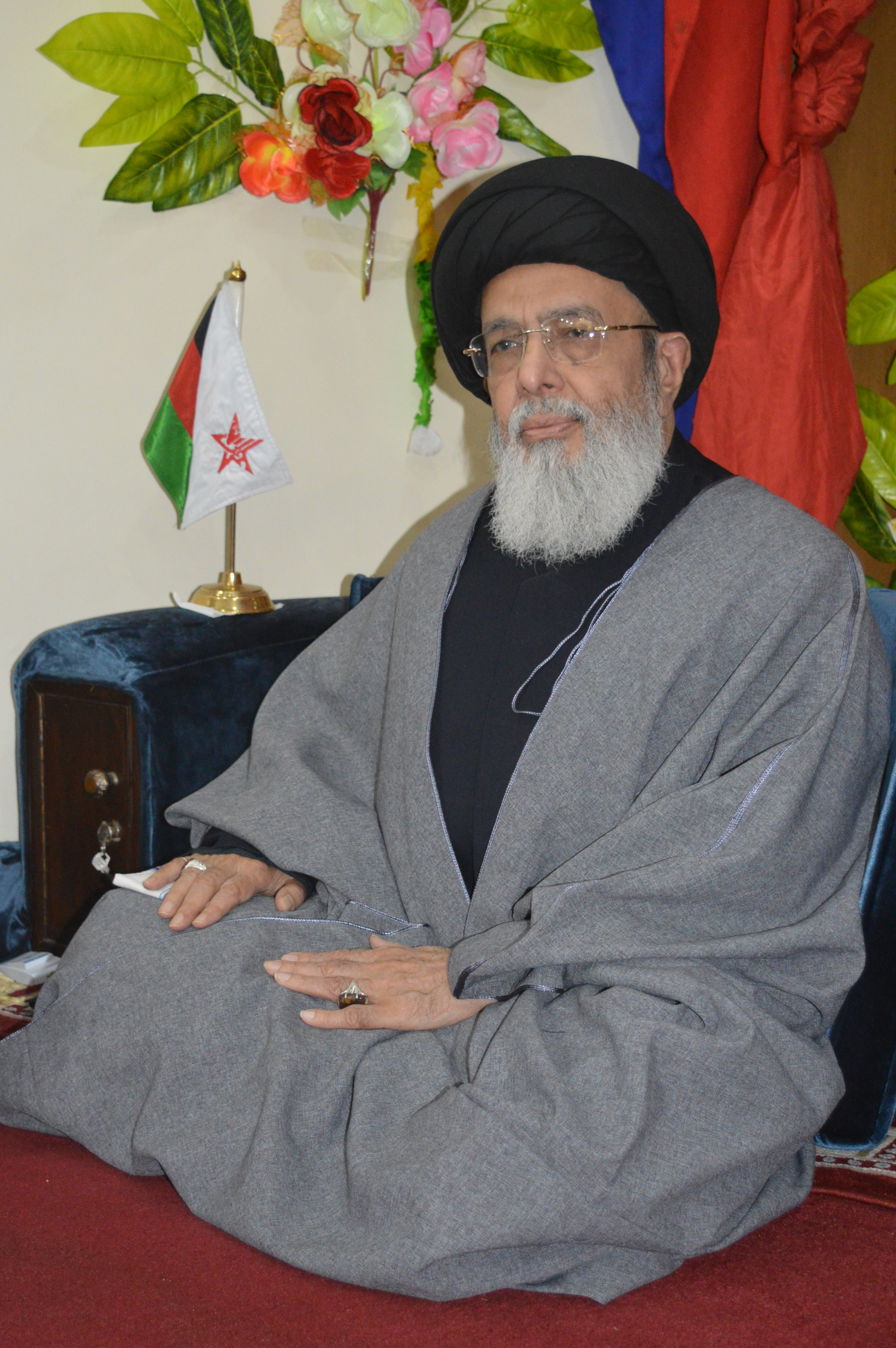
- Agha Syed Hamid Ali Shah Moosavi
- Title: Quaid-i-Millat-e-Jafariya (Spiritual Leader of the Pakistani Shiites) (Urdu: قائد ملت جعفریہ) Agha G Sarkar

Personal life
- Born: 12 May 1936 Tharparkar, Sind, British India
- Died: 25 July 2022 (aged 86)

Religious life
- Religion: Islam
- School: Twelver

Muslim leader
- Based in: Pakistan
- Post: Quaid-i-Millat-e-Jafariya
- Period in office: 10 February 1984 - 25 July 2022
- Predecessor: Mufti Jafar Hussain

Agha Syed Hamid Ali Shah Moosavi (Persian: آغا سید حامد علی شاہ موسوی; 12 May 1936– 25 July 2022) was the patron-in-chief of the supreme Shia ulama board and president of Tehrik-e-Nafaz-e-Fiqah-e-Jafaria (Arabic: تحریکِ نفاذِ فقہ جعفريه), the Shiite-law implementation movement. His family is descended from Imam Musa al Kadhim, the seventh imam of Twelver Shias. Moosavi became president of Tehrik-e-Nafaz-e-Fiqah-e-Jafaria of Pakistan after the death of Mufti Jafar Hussain.

After Agha Ji, the Supreme Council elected Agha Syed Hussain Muqaddsi as the head of Tehreek Nafeez Fiqh Jafaria Pakistan on October 21, 2022 according to the constitution. Agha Syed Hussain Muqaddsi was the student of Quaid Millat Jafaria Agha Syed Hamid Ali Shah Moosavi Al Najafi and he is a great religious scholar. Ayatollah Taqi Behjat, Mufti Shia, Ayatollah Kokbi, Ayatullah Saeed Ul Hakeem, Ayatullah Mohsin Ul Hakeem, and other great Ayatollahs are the teachers of Agha Syed Hussain Muqaddsi. https://www.thenews.com.pk/print/1003323-muqadasi-appointed-new-tnfj-chief

== Early Age ==
Agha Syed Hamid Ali Shah Moosavi was born in Goth Khan Sahib Syed Sher Shah situated in District Tharparkar of Sindh Province. His ancestral town is District Chakwal of Pakistan's Punjab Province. He got his early education from Govt. High School Karyala Chakwal.

Agha Syed Hamid Ali Shah Moosavi lost his father in very early age and he then moved to his native motherland Veryaamal, in District Chakwal. He got his early education from Middle School Karyala and early religious education from Maulana Ghulam Qambar Faazil Lucknow. Later he was admitted to Darul Uloom Muhammadiya Sargodha in 1954 and he remained there till he passed Faazil Arabi in 1960. In this Darul Uloom, he was taught Fasahat-o-Balaghat, logic, philosophy, Usool-i-Fiqh (Jurisprudence) and Fiqh from his teacher Naseer-ul-Millat Allama Naseer Hussain.

== Education at Najaf Iraq ==
In 1956 Agha Syed Hamid Ali Shah Moosavi went to Najaf al-ashraf Iraq for higher religious education on insistence of a great spiritual figure Peer Fazal Hussain Shah. Agha Moosavi participated in Dars-e-Kharij under the patronage of renowned teachers of Hoza Ilmiya. Some of them are Ayatollah Khomeni, Ayatollah Mufti Al-Shia, Ayatollah Syed Muhammad Ardbeli Al-Moosavi and Ayatullah Al-Uzma Syed Abul Qasim Al-Khoei.

== Representative of Muhsin al-Hakim ==
In 1967, Shiites from Rawalpindi and Islamabad asked Muhsin al-Hakim to send a representative to Pakistan. Earlier, Muhammad Saeed al-Hakim had visited Pakistan as a representative of Muhammad Ali al-Hakim. After Ali al-Hakim's death, Muhsin al-Hakim sent Moosavi to Rawalpindi as his representative. Abu al-Qasim al-Khoei, Ruhollah Khomeini, Abdullah Musawi Shirazi, Jawad Tabrizi, Mahmoud Hashemi Shahroudi and Mohammad al-Husayni al-Shirazi also named Moosavi their representative.

== Guidance from Muhammad Baqir al-Sadr ==
When Muhammad Zia-ul-Haq imposed martial law in Pakistan on 5 July 1977, he announced his intention to make Pakistan an Islamic state. Moosavi, wrote to Muhammad Baqir al-Sadr with an explanation of the regional situation and seeking guidance on protecting Shiite rights. Baqir al-Sadr stressed the need for the government to understand Islamic fundamentals and structure and endorsed Moosavi.

== Leadership of Pakistani Shiites ==
In December 1983, a delegation of Shia scholars asked Moosavi to accept the leadership of Tehrik-e-Nafaz-e-Fiqh-e-Jafariya (TNFJ). He accepted the leadership contingent on its endorsement by Pakistani Shiites, and a meeting was held in Dina on 9–10 February 1984. Allamahs Azher Hasan Zaidi, Zamir-ul-Hasan Najafi, Mirza Yousaf Hussain and Bashir Ansari Taxila presided over the convention.

== End of Mourning of Muharram ban ==
In 1984 Zia ul Haq imposed a ban on Husayn ibn Ali mourning processions by legislative amendment, and Moosavi opposed the ban. After the 1985 general election, Muhammad Khan Junejo became Prime Minister of Pakistan. Junejo began negotiations with TNFJ leaders, and an agreement was finalized on 21 May 1985 removing restrictions on religious processions.

== Moosavi Peace Formula ==
The Moosavi Peace Formula was announced in 1997 by TNFJ, when former Chief Justice of Pakistan Justice Sajjad Ali Shah took suo moto notice on continued Terrorism and TNFJ Delegation led by Allama Tajuddin Haideri presented suggestions to eradicate terrorism. Main point of Moosavi Peace Formula was to stop foreign funding of different religious organizations in Pakistan.

== Code of Azadari ==
The 17-point Moosavi Peace Formula was announced by Agha Hamid Moosavi before start of Muharram every year, and Moosavi has criticized non implementation of Pakistan's National Action Plan.
