= Muhammad Nawaz Irfani =

Allama Hujjat al-Islam Shaheed Quaid-e-Parachinar Muhammad Nawaz Irfani محمد نواز عرفانی

3rd Supreme Leader of Parachinar
- In office 18 June 2002 – 26 November 2014
- Preceded by: Sheikh Ali Madad
- Succeeded by: Fida Hussain Muzahiri

Personal details
- Born: 1 January 1970 Danyor, Gilgit
- Died: 26 November 2014 (aged 44) Islamabad, Pakistan; Buried Parachinar
- Party: Anjuman e Hussainia
- Children: Mehdi Irfani; Ali Hadi Irfani
- Education: Govt.School Danyor Gilgit; Jamia tul Muntazar Lahore; Hoza Elmia Qom
- Profession: Imam Mosque, Teacher
- Website: http://www.shaheedirfani.tk (Personal Website)

Muhammad Nawaz Irfani (Urdu: محمد نواز عرفانی, 1 January 1970 – 2014) was a Parachinar Pakistan Shia Muslim religious leader, revolutionary, and politician. He was succeeded by Fida Hussain Muzahiri.

== Early life ==
Muhammad Nawaz Irfani was born in Danyor, Gilgit. His early education was in the local school of the village. His family was Ismaili Shia, but his grandfather and father give priority to Twelver Shia Islam over Ismaili religion and linked with Shia Islam. As a result, they had to endure a lot of hardships and trouble.

== Educational life ==
Patiently for all offenses his father sent his dear son to Jamia tul Muntazar Lahore. There he got religious education and benefited from many scholars.

== Death ==
Allama Mohammad Nawaz Irfani was shot dead in Islamabad on Wednesday 26 November 2014. A large number of people from all walks of life attended the funeral, which was held after Friday prayers at the central Eidgah. Later, he was laid to rest at the Eidgah graveyard. The participants expressed shock and anguish over the killing of the Shia scholar and urged the government to arrest the culprits and award them exemplary punishment. Local tribes of Kurram Agency announced a 40-day mourning over the killing of Allama Irfani.

== See also ==
- Sheikh Rajab Ali
- Sheikh Ali Madad
- Arif Hussain Hussaini
