= Islam-e-Naab =

Islam-e-Naab اسلام ناب is a modern term which means "Pure Islam". It was highlighted in the modern era. Islam-e-Naab is the teachings of Khomeini. Imam Rahil gave this concept to the Islamic World in early revelation days. Islam-e-Naab rejects Tagotiyat, extremism, takfirism and terrorism but accepts Pan Islamic Unity, System of Wilayat, Universal Peace and Brotherhood. Islam-e-Naab respects other religions as well as other sects of Islam. This concept emerged after the Islamic Revolution in Iran in 1979. Allamah Syed Jawad Naqvi is significant for his unique style of preaching of Islam-e-Naab, the pure Islam, stepping away from the traditional practice among Shia Muslims Ulama of confronting Sunni Muslims beliefs and delivering dialogue-filled sermons.
