= Ali Hadi (politician) =

Pakistani politician

Member of the Provincial Assembly of Khyber Pakhtunkhwa
- Incumbent
- Assumed office 29 February 2024
- Constituency: PK-96 Kurram-II

Personal details
- Born: Kurram District, Khyber Pakhtunkhwa, Pakistan
- Party: PTI-P (2025-present)
- Other political affiliations: PTI (2024-2025)
- Parent: Muhammad Nawaz Irfani (father)

Ali Hadi is a Pakistani politician from Kurram District who has been a member of the Provincial Assembly of Khyber Pakhtunkhwa since February 2024. He is the son of Muhammad Nawaz Irfani, a Shia Muslim religious leader and politician from Parachinar.

== Career ==
He contested the 2024 general elections as an independent Candidate from PK-96 Kurram-II and secured 38,593 votes.
