= Sheikh Ali Madad =

Sheikh Ali Madad شیخ علی مدد

2nd Supreme Leader of Parachinar
- In office 1985 – 18 June 2002
- Preceded by: Sheikh Rajab Ali
- Succeeded by: Muhammad Nawaz Irfani

Personal details
- Born: Gilgit
- Died: 18 June 2002 Parachinar
- Party: Anjuman e Hussainia
- Profession: ٰImam Mosque, Teacher

Sheikh Ali Madad (Urdu: شیخ علی مدد) was a Parachinar Pakistani Shia Muslim religious leader and politician born in Gilgit. He died on 18 June 2002, and was succeeded by Muhammad Nawaz Irfani.

== See also ==
- Sheikh Rajab Ali
- Muhammad Nawaz Irfani
- Arif Hussain Hussaini
- Sheikh Fida Hussain Muzahiri
