= Tret, Murree =

Tret
- Union council
- Interactive map of Tret
- Country: Pakistan
- Province: Punjab
- District: Murree
- Tehsil: Murree

Population
  - Total: 30,184

Tret is a village and union council of Murree Tehsil in the Murree District of Punjab, Pakistan. It is located in the south of the tehsil at 33°49′60″N 73°16′60″E and is bounded to the north by Khyber Pakhtunkhwa, to the north-east by Ghora Gali, to the east by Numbal and to the south by Angoori. During the British rule, Tret housed a few army installations and a Dak Bungalow

According to the 1998 census of Pakistan it had a population of 14,184.

== Population ==
The majority of Tret population belongs to Shia sect.

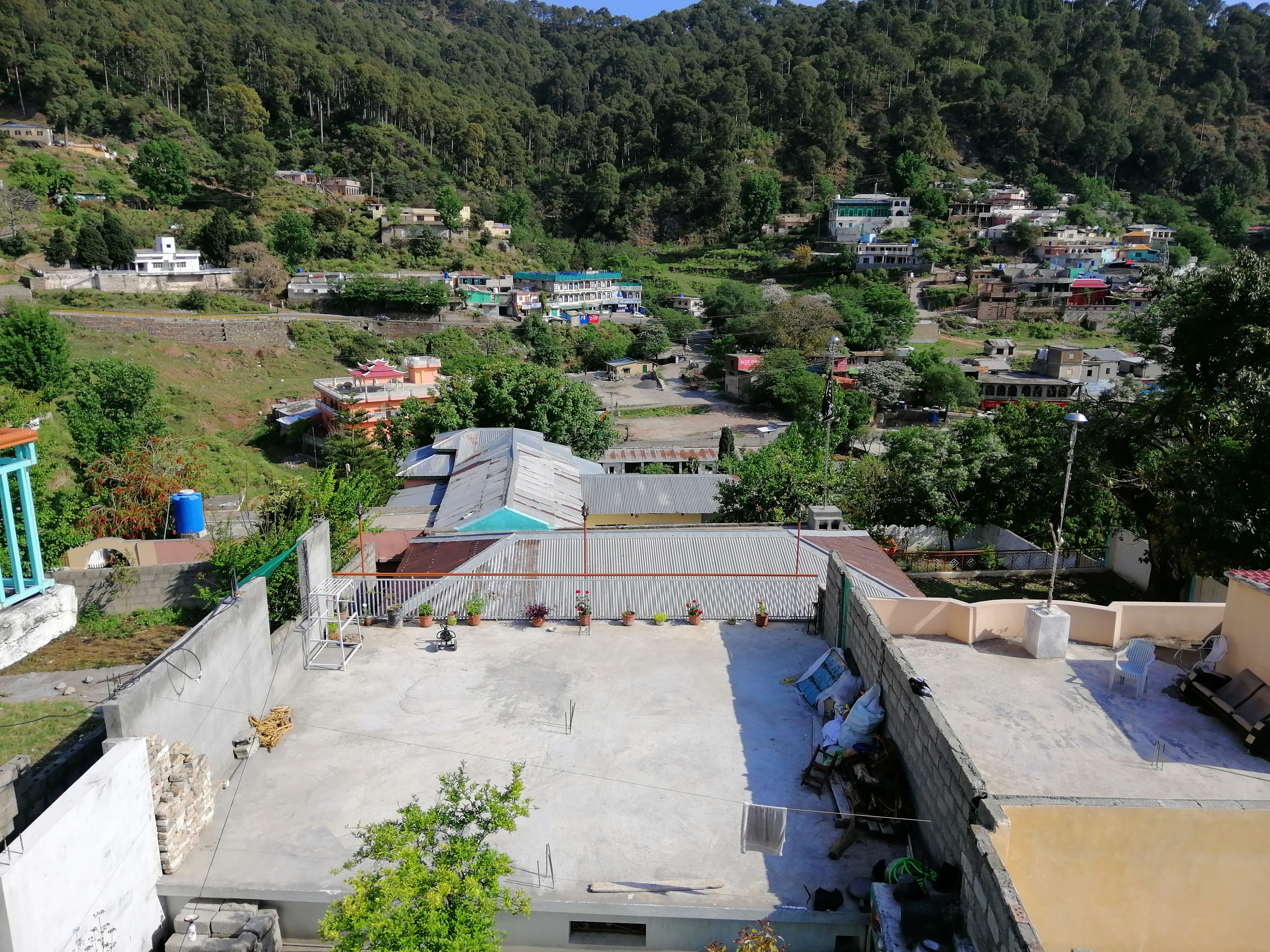
