= Ajmal Pahari =

Shahnawaz, alias Ajmal Pahari (Urdu: اجمل پہاڑی), is a target killer belonging to the Muttahida Qaumi Movement. On camera he confessed to involvement in at least 600 murders and to being a wanted militant in four murder cases to the Korangi, Liaquatabad, and Bilal Colony Police Stations that took place during 2004 to 2008. He also confessed that he got training from Indian Army officers for nearly six months.
