= Syed Sajid Ali Naqvi =

Pakistani Shia Islamic scholar

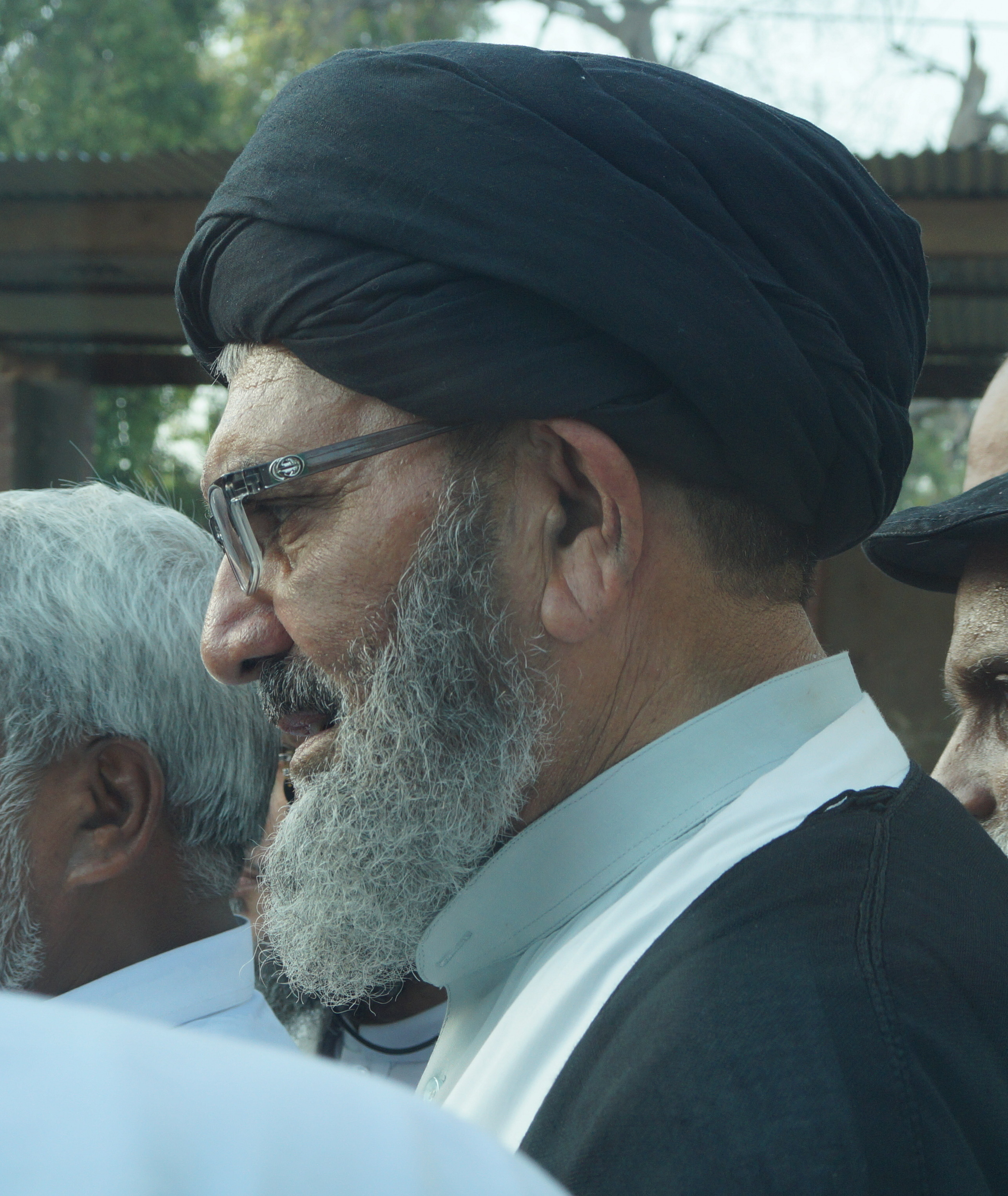

Leader of the Islami Tehreek Pakistan
- Incumbent
- Assumed office 2012
- Preceded by: Position established

Patron-in-Chief of Shia Ulema Council
- Incumbent
- Assumed office 1988
- Preceded by: Arif Hussain Hussaini

Personal details
- Born: 1 January 1940 (age 86) Attock, Pakistan
- Party: Islami Tehreek Pakistan
- Other political affiliations: TJP/Islami Tehreek/Shia Ulema Council
- Parent: Syed Mohammad Ali Shah
- Occupation: Islamic scholar & Politician

Syed Sajid Ali Naqvi (Urdu: سید ساجد علی نقوی) is a Pakistani Shia Islamic scholar from Rawalpindi, Pakistan. He is the founder and leader of Islami Tehreek Pakistan also Patron-in-Chief of Shia Ulema Council. His stated objective is to establish Islamic rule and he has advocated for the rights of Shias in Pakistan.

== Political history ==
=== Tehreek-e-Jafaria ===
He is also the head of one of the largest Shia Islam organizations in Pakistan the Tehreek-e-Jafaria. After a ban by 1995 regime, it continues to work under the name of Tehreek-e-Islami. Again the Tehreek-e-Islami was banned and a new party was formed with the name Shia Ulema Council. Naqvi also headed the religious wing of Tehreek-e-Islami i.e. the Shia Ulema Council. After the murder of Arif Hussain Hussaini in 1988, he was elected as the head of Quaid e Millat e Jaffaria of the Tehrik-e-Jafaria by the Supreme Council of Shia clergy of Pakistan.

=== Islami Tehreek Pakistan ===
He is currently the founder and leader of Islami Tehreek Pakistan.

== Arrest and release ==
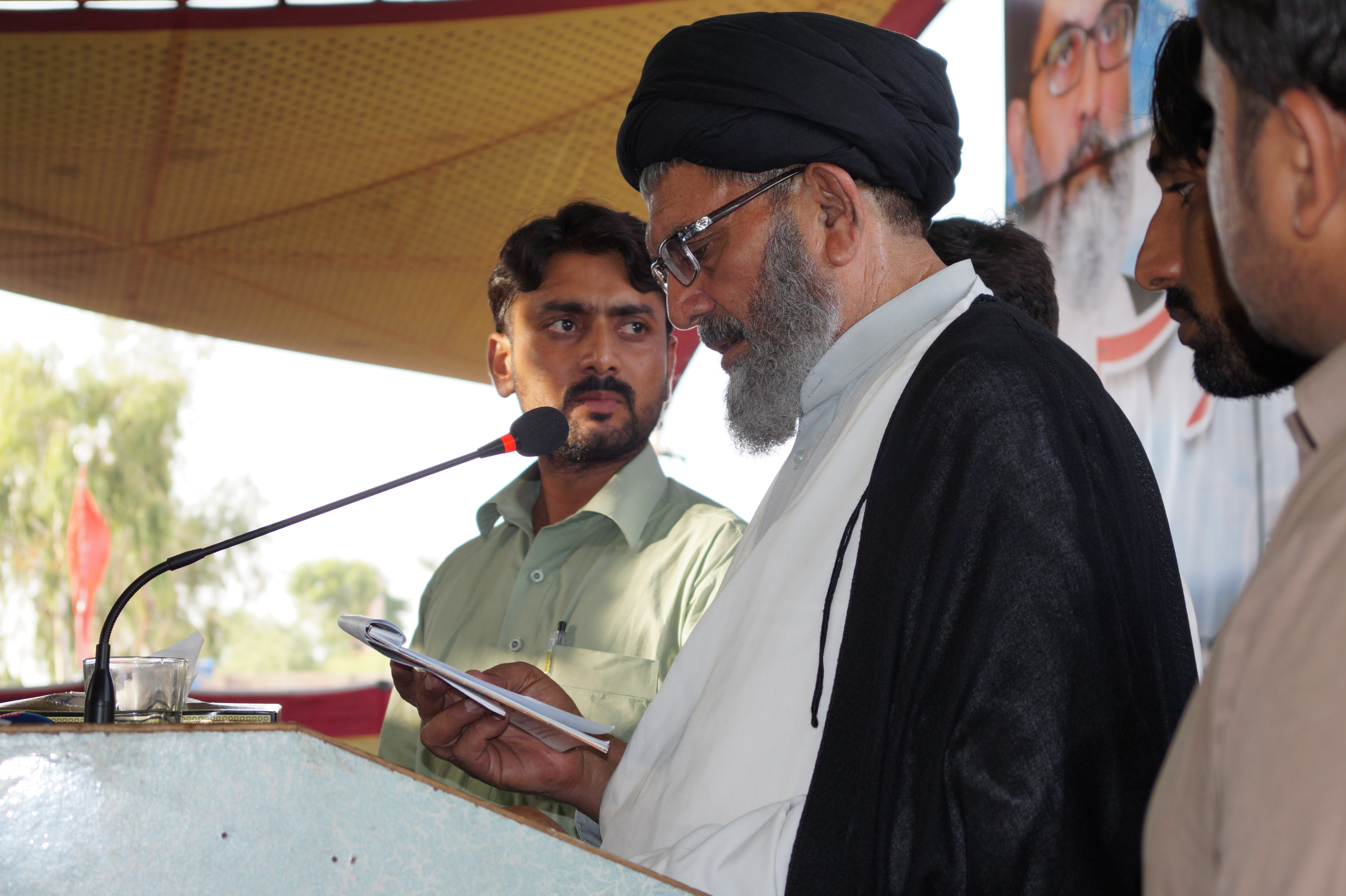
Sajid Ali Naqvi at a press conference in Multan

in November 2003 Pervez Musharraf regime arrested the Naqvi in charge of Azam Tariq murder case the leader of Sipah-e-Sahaba, an Islamic extremist anti-Shia Sunni Deobandi Islamist organization leader who was murdered in 2003 by a member of the Sipah-e-Muhammad a Shia militant organization in revenge for the Quetta mosque attack and the massacre of more than 50 Shia muslims by Sipah-e-Sahaba in 2003. The Thousands of his supporters warned the government that they would besiege the federal capital if the government did not release Naqvi within the next few weeks. The demonstrators staged a rally in Islamabad on Sunday to protest the detention of Naqvi and the killing of Shiite leaders.

Naqvi was released on bail from the Adiala Jail on Saturday. The Golra Police arrested him on November 16, in connection with the Azam Tariq murder case. After rejection of his bail petition in a special anti-terrorist court, Naqvi's lawyers went to the high court, which ordered his release. Naqvi's sons and the Muttahida Majlis-e-Amal leaders received him and he was taken to his home under tight security.

== See also ==
- Islami Tehreek Pakistan
