= Allama Hassan Turabi =

Assassinated Shia cleric

Allama Hassan Turabi (Urdu: علامہ حسن ترابی) was a Pakistani politician and prominent Shia Muslim cleric. He was the divisional president of the Shiite political party, Tehrik-e-Jafaria Pakistan in Karachi. He was assassinated by a Sunni Bangladeshi on 14 July 2006 following his return from an Muttahida Majlis-e-Amal-led anti-Israel protest regarding the 2006 Lebanon War and Palestine Issue.

== Early life ==
He was born in 1953 at Shigar district of Baltistan area of Western Ladakh. After completing his secondary education he got admission in a madressa at Skardu, he then migrated to Karachi and got his master's degree from University of Karachi. He also completed his religious education at Jama Imamia Nazimabad (Karachi).

He became the Khateeb of a shia Jamia Mosque at Mehmoodabad in Karachi in 1976 after completion of his education from Jama Imamia.

== Political career ==
He joined Tehrik-e-Nifaz-e-Fiqh-e-Jafaria in the early 80s and in almost 1989 he became the divisional president of organization. Due to his immense interest in national politics he became the provincial General Secretary of Tehrik.

The organization changed its name to Tehrik-e-Jafaria Pakistan. In 1999 this organization was banned by the Musharraf Government, so scholars of the organization formed another platform named Tehrik-e-Islami and after that, the current organization Shia Ulema Council. Turabi also held a strong position in Muttahida Majlis-e-Amal, the united front of six Islamic parties of Pakistan.

== Struggle for Muslim unity ==
He always made efforts for uniting Muslims of different schools of thought.

== Soldier of Wilayat-e-Faqeeh ==
He was the preacher and follower of "Guardianship of the Islamic Jurists" (Arabic: ولاية الفقيه Wilayat al-Faqih) school of thought and tried to work to preach the thoughts of Imam Khomeini and Ali Khamenei. Guardianship of the [Islamic] Jurists is a Twelver doctrine regarding Islamic leadership.

== Death ==
Karachi since 1980 has been the scene of bloody rivalry between Pakistan's Sunni Muslims and Shia Muslims .

Turabi was attacked in Karachi several times by what he believed to be the agents of the United States, whom he blamed along with Israel for inciting sectarian violence. The last unsuccessful attempt was made on 6 April 2006 near his residence at Abbas Town in which he escaped. This attack was accomplished by blasting a remotely controlled bomb hidden under a fruit cart as he climbed into his car outside his home. Two bodyguards and a passerby were hurt in that incident, and the car was severely damaged.

The final attempt made on 14 July 2006 succeeded. At a rally that was organized by Muttahida Majlis-e-Amal to protest Israel's role in the 2006 Israel-Lebanon conflict. When he reached his house in Abbas Town (Karachi), he got out of his jeep and was killed by 16-year-old (some sources say 25-year-old) Bangladeshi suicide bomber Abdul Karim, who was disguised as beggar. Kalim was wearing a 2.5 kg explosive (some sources say 1 kg) loaded jacket blew himself up when he approached Turabi at his house's main gate. Turabi's ten-year-old nephew Ali Imran and one guard also martyred, and three policemen were wounded in the attack at Abul Hassan Isphahani Road at Gulshan-e-Iqbal Town.

The bomber said in his video message that he is carrying out the attack on his own and that he is happy to do so, but the police had arrested Sultan alias Mahmood, Rahmatuallh, Mohammad Amin and Mufti Zakir Hussain Siddiqui for their alleged involvement in the case. Mohammad Khalid, Qari Abid and Mohammad Sadiq were declared absconders.
