= Tehreek-e-Jafaria (Pakistan) =

Political party (1979–2002)

Tehreek e Jafria Pakistan تحریکِ جعفریہ پاکستان
- Abbreviation: TJP
- Leader: Mufti Jafar Hussain # (1979–1983); Arif Hussain Hussaini X (1979–1988); Syed Sajid Ali Naqvi (1988–present)
- Founders: Syed Muhammad Dehlavi; Shaikh Muhammad Hussain Najafi; Arif Hussain Hussaini; Syed Munir Hussain Gilani; Allama Hassan Turabi
- Founded: 1979
- Preceded by: Shiite Demands Committee
- Headquarters: Islamabad
- Student wing: Jafaria Students Organization Pakistan
- Political wing: Shia Ulema Council
- Armed wing: Sipah-e-Muhammad Pakistan (allegedly)
- Ideology: Pakistan Shiite minority rights Ja'fari revivalism Shia Islamism; Clericalism; Wilayat al Faqih; Political Islam; Pan-Islamism; Religious conservatism Anti-imperialism; Anti-Western; Anti-Marxism; Factions: Pro-Khomeinism (Syed Arif Hussaini/Syed Sajid Naqvi faction officially since 1984); Pro-Shariatmadari (Agha Syed Hamid Mossavi faction historically)
- Political position: Big tent Factions: Right-wing to far-right
- Religion: Shia Islam
- National affiliation: Supreme Shia Ulema Board; Islami Tehreek Pakistan; Muttahida Majlis-e-Amal; Imamia Students Organization; Majlis Wahdat-e-Muslimeen
- Colors: Black, Red and Green
- Slogan: Allāhu ʾakbar Arabic: الله أكبر (lit. 'God is greatest')

Party flag

Website
- www.jafariapress.com

Tehreek-e-Jafaria Pakistan (Urdu: تحریکِ جعفریہ پاکستان, lit. 'Pakistan Movement of the Ja'fari'; TJP), formerly Tehreek Nifaz Fiqah-e-Jafaria Arif Hussaini Group (TNFJ-AH Group) or Tehreek Nifaz Fiqah-e-Jafaria Sajid Naqvi Group (TNFJ-SN Group) was a Shia political party in Pakistan from 1979 to 2002. Belonging to the Ja'fari school of Islamic jurisprudence, TNFJ (Arif Hussaini Group) was founded in 1979 by Arif Hussain Hussaini supported by Grand Ayatollah Muhammad Hussain Najafi Dhaku. Its creation coincided with the enforcement of controversial Islamic laws by then President of Pakistan, General Mohammad Zia-ul-Haq. At the same time, 1979 Iranian Revolution in Shi'a Iran added extra confidence and comfort in the movement.

In 1988, TJP under the leadership of Molana Sajid Naqvi contested in general elections but failed to win a single seat. After getting banned twice, it is current active under its political front known as the Shia Ulema Council, which working under the leadership of Syed Sajid Ali Naqvi.

Jafaria Students Organization Pakistan, founded in 1997, was the student wing of TJP now its operating under Shia Ulema Council, The present day political wing of TJP.

The TJP was largely inspired by the Iran's Islamic revolution.

== History ==
=== Foundation ===
It was founded by a committee of Shia ulema, and Syed Muhammad Dehlavi of Karachi was elected its first president. After his demise, Mufti Jafar Hussain was elected its president. After Mufti Jafar Hussain's demise, the young Arif Hussain al-Hussaini was asked by senior ulema like Marja' Grand Ayatollah Muhammad Hussain Najafi and Safdar Hussain Najafi to accept the leadership. After Arif Hussain's assassination, Sajid Naqvi was elected the next president. Hassan Turabi was the head of party in Sindh province, like Taqi Naqvi and Atemad ul Ulema Allama Sheikh Muhammad Shabi ul Hasnain Muhammadi (son of Sanad-ul-Ulema Grand Ayatollah Sheikh Muhammad Ejaz Hasan Muhammadi and grandson of Iftikar ul Ulema Grand Ayatollah Sheikh Muhammad Jaffar Hasan Muhammadi ) heads the party in Punjab.

=== Internal split and Deaths ===
After the death of Mufti Jafar Hussain, TNFH split into two groups: one headed by Hamid Moosavi, the follower of Ayatollah Shariatmadari; the other headed by Hussaini, the follower of Khomeini’s teachings, respectively due to ideological differences between the two leaders. Under Hussaini, the party began to accept Sunni members, but it remained a religious organisation. Arif Hussain Hussaini, a student of Ruhollah Khomeini who led the Iranian Revolution, was the group's leader. According to BBC News:

the creation of TeJ coincided with the Shia revolution in Iran and enforcement of controversial Islamic laws by the military ruler of Pakistan, General Zia-ul-Haq. The revolution in predominantly Shia Iran around the same time gave an added boost to the organisation. Its leader, Arif Hussain Hussaini was a student of the leader of Iran's Islamic Revolution, Ruhollah Khomeini.

Later in 1988, Arif Hussain Hussaini changed the name of his group from TNFJ-Arif Hussaini group to Tehreek-e-Jafaria (TJP) while Agha Syed Hamid Ali Shah Moosavi's group retained the name of TNFJ and has been operating under the same name since. After demise of Agha Syed Hamid Ali Shah Moosavi, Hussain Muqaddesi was elected as TNFJ Chief in October 2022. The TJP founder, Arif Hussain Hussaini was assassinated in 1988 by unknown attackers.

Arif Hussain Hussaini, the patron-in-chief of the TJP, was shot dead in Peshawar near his mosque/seminary while going to lead the morning prayer on August 5, 1988. Then T.J.P. was led by Hussaini's one of the foremost companions Syed Sajid Ali Naqvi.

On October 19, 2001, TJP leader Nazir Ahmed Abbas was shot and killed at his shop in the city of Vehari, located in the Punjab province.

Following the death of Zia-ul-Haq, support for the TJP fell, as Pakistani Shias went back to pre-Zia-ul-Haq political loyalties, with many no longer feeling under threat. Furthermore, the elections of moderate Benazir Bhutto also gave increased confidence to Shia Muslims and they were no longer under threat and the discrimination ended even though it still exist against the Pakistani Shias.

=== Sanctions ===
On January 12, 2002, the TJP was banned along with three terrorist organizations, by the government of Pakistan.

The TJP was banned twice by Pervez Musharraf's government and in January 2002, its leaders were arrested. The T.J.P. was banned again on November 5, 2011, while Pakistan's Shias experienced increasing attacks since 2005 by the Pakistani Taliban, Sipah-e-Sahaba, Lashkar-e-Jhangvi, Jundullah and Turkistan Islamic Party.

Although TJP had been designated as a "terrorist organisation", Qazi Hussain Ahmad, a senior member of Pakistani Parliament and the leader of Jamaat-e-Islami, Pakistan's oldest Islamist party, said the banned groups have no ties with the militants. He notes that one organization is part of the Muttahida Majlis-e-Amal, the major opposition alliance of religious parties, which also includes Ahmad's group against Pervaiz Musharraf.

In March 2024, Punjab Counter-Terrorism Department (CTD) claimed to have conducted 229 intelligence-based operations in different districts of Punjab to thwart incidents of terrorism, in which 228 suspects were picked and interrogated. Of them, 23 alleged terrorists were arrested with weapons, explosives and other prohibited materials. The suspects allegedly belong to the banned militant outfits Al-Qaeda, Tehreek-i-Taliban Pakistan, Baloch Liberation Army, Lashkar-i-Jhangvi, Sipah-e-Sahaba Pakistan, Tehreek-i-Jafaria Pakistan and Jaish-i-Mohammed.

In September 2024, according to a spokesman of Pakistan Counter Terrorism Department, CTD Punjab carried out 475 intelligence-based operations in different districts of Punjab in order to prevent terrorism attacks, during which 475 individuals were interrogated while 33 suspects possessing weapons, explosives, and other prohibited materials, were arrested. The arrested suspects belonged to banned organizations, isuch as Sipah-e-Sahaba Pakistan, Fitnal Khwarji (Pakistani Taliban), Lashkar-e-Jhangvi, the 133 Brigade, Tehreek-e-Jafaria Pakistan, Al-Qaeda, Jamaat-ul-Ahrar, [retired/former] Zainebiyoun Brigade and others. They had been arrested during operations conducted in: Gujranwala, Hafizabad, Mianwali, Bahawalpur, Nankana Sahib, Lahore, Khushab, Jhang, Attock, Sargodha, Sheikhupura, Faisalabad, Bahawalnagar, Rawalpindi, Bhakkar, Hafizabad, Narowal, Attock, Sahiwal and Rahim Yar Khan, according to the CTD Punjab spokesperson. As per a list provided by the CTD of the 33 suspects, eight of them, the highest number, had been arrested from Lahore. During the operations, 4,895 grams of explosives, 2 hand grenades, 2 IEDs (improvised explosive devices), 26 detonators, 73 feet of safety fuse wire, 4 pistols, 19 bullets, 17 pamphlets of banned organizations, 7 magazines, 15 boxes, 121 pamphlets, 156 stickers, 4 receipt books, 2 mobile phones and Rs 99,660 in cash had been recovered from the suspects.

== Ideology ==
According to TJP, Islam is and was the basic ideology of Pakistan; by deviating this ideology, a conspiracy was made to make Pakistan a sectarian state in the period of General Zia-ul-Haq, a dictator. At this stage, the formation of TNFJ was deemed necessary for the failure of this conspiracy.

The main objective of this organisation was to protect the rights of Shia Muslims of Pakistan and give them a voice in the Parliament of Pakistan. They do not advocate a Shia Islamic state and have cordial relations with Sunni organization including Sunni Ittehad Council, that is why they joined the coalition of religious political parties Muttahida Majlis-e-Amal that won 53 out of 272 elected members in legislative elections held on October 20, 2002.

== Coalition ==
It was a part of the Muttahida Majlis-e-Amal coalition of Islamist political parties that won 11.3% of the popular vote and 53 out of 272 seats in the legislative elections held on October 20, 2002. In May 2008, it was reported that Jamaat-e-Islami Pakistan's emir Qazi Hussain Ahmad was considered heading the six-party Muttahida Majlis-e-Amal. Qazi Hussain Ahmad said that he would consider rejoining the MMA after consulting with the executive council of his party and some other seniors. Jamiat Ulema-e-Islam (F)'s chief Fazl-ur-Rahman had tasked Sajid Naqvi of TJP with contacting Qazi Hussain Ahmad and bringing him round to rejoining the alliance.

== See also ==
- Jafaria Students Organization Pakistan
- Majlis Wahdat-e-Muslimeen
- Shia Ulema Council
- Imamia Students Organization
- List of Islamic political parties
- Liwa Zainebiyoun
- Sipah-e-Muhammad Pakistan
- Islami Tehreek Pakistan
