= Mufti Jafar Hussain =

Pakistani politician (1914–1983)

Principal of Howza ilmeya jamia jaffria
- In office 1979–1983
- Succeeded by: Syed Jawad Naqvi

Personal details
- Born: 1914 India
- Died: 1983 (aged 68) Pakistan

Mufti Jafar Hussain (Urdu: مفتی جعفر حسین; 1914 - 29 August 1983) was a Pakistani, Shia Islamic scholar.

== Life ==
His father Hakeem Charagh Deen took his son to his uncle Hakeem Shahab-ul-deen to teach his son the basics of Islam. His uncle started teaching him Quran and Arabic from the age of five until seven. He started learning Hadith and jurisprudence at the age of seven from other scholars. Then he went to Lucknow with Mirza Ahmad Ali Marhoom to learn more Islamic education at the Madrassa-e-nazmia, where he won prizes.

After getting education there for nine years he went to Houza-e-Najaf-e-ashraf, Iraq in 1935. There he gained much knowledge from many scholars including Syed Abu al-Hassan Esfahani for five years. Then he came to his city Gujranwala and started preaching the teachings of Islam. Howza ilmeya jamia jaffria is an Islamic University which was founded by Hussain in 1979. It is located in Gujranwala, Punjab, Pakistan. He was succeeded by Syed Jawad Naqvi as chancellor. Now, it is affiliated with Jamia Urwa-tul-Wusqa.

Mufti Jafar Hussain was a Pakistani Shia mujtahid and a political leader. He was elected as the President of Tehrik-e-Nifaz-e-Fiqh-e-Jafaria (later split into two groups, one headed by Arif Hussaini (Now banned Tehrik-e-Jafaria Pakistan TJP) while the second group headed by Hamid Ali Moosavi called (Tehrik-e-Nifaz-e-Fiqh-e-Jafaria TNFJ continues to function under the old nomenclature of TNFJ), after the demise of Syed Muhammad Dehlavi. He wrote a number of books, the most famous of which includes translation of Nahj al-Balagha and Al-Sahifa al-Sajjadiyya. He died on 29 August 1983.

On 18 May 1952 Chaudhry Zafr ullah Khan, the Foreign Minister, gave a talk in Karachi that hurt the feelings of some Muslims. As a reaction to this, an all parties conference was arranged. Mufti Jafar Hussain was a signatory on the invitation that was issued for the meet. He gave a very thought provoking speech during the conference and highlighted the points of view of his Sect. At the end of the deliberations the conference resolved that Ahmadiyya be deemed a non-Muslim minority, Chaudhry Zafr ullah Khan be removed from the position of Foreign Minister and also other Ahmadis working as important functionaries be relieved of their positions.

== See also ==
- Tehrik-e-Jafaria Pakistan
- Grand Ayatollah Muhammad Hussain Najafi
- Allama Arif Hussain Hussaini
