= Muttahida Qaumi Movement =

Muttahida Qaumi Movement (abbreviated MQM) is a name currently claimed by two competing Pakistani political factions:

- Muttahida Qaumi Movement – London, a political faction managed from London
- Muttahida Qaumi Movement – Pakistan, a political party in Pakistan
