= Islami Tehreek Pakistan =

Islami Tehreek Pakistan اسلامی تحریک پاکستان
- Abbreviation: ITP
- Leader: Syed Sajid Ali Naqvi
- Founder: Syed Sajid Ali Naqvi
- Founded: 2012; 14 years ago
- Headquarters: Islamabad, Pakistan
- Student wing: Jafaria Students Organization Pakistan
- Ideology: Islamism
- Religion: Shia Islam
- National affiliation: S.U.C; PDM; TTAP
- Colors: Green and White
- Gilgit-Baltistan Assembly: Assembly Dissolved

Election symbol
- Two Swords

Party flag
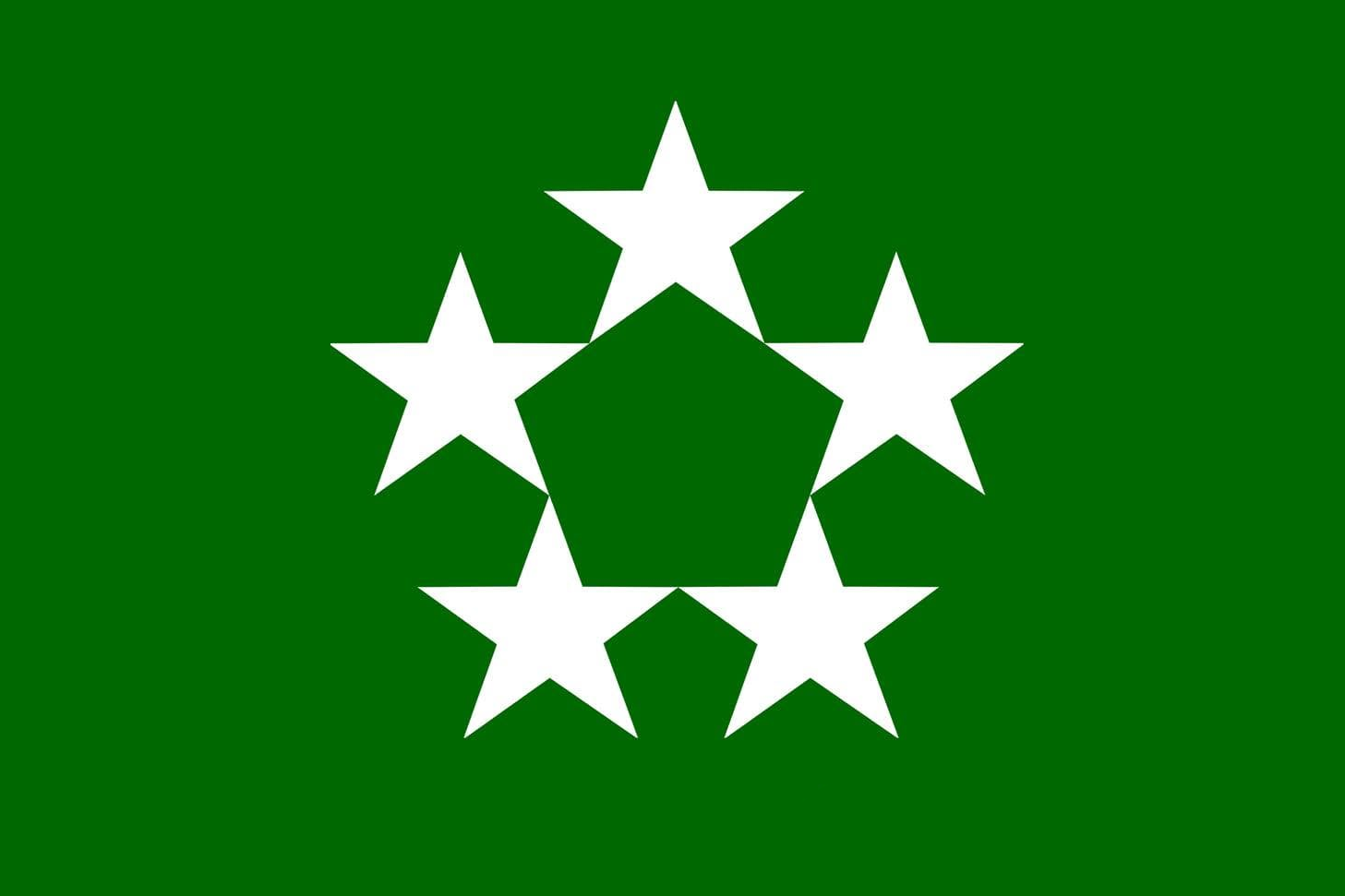
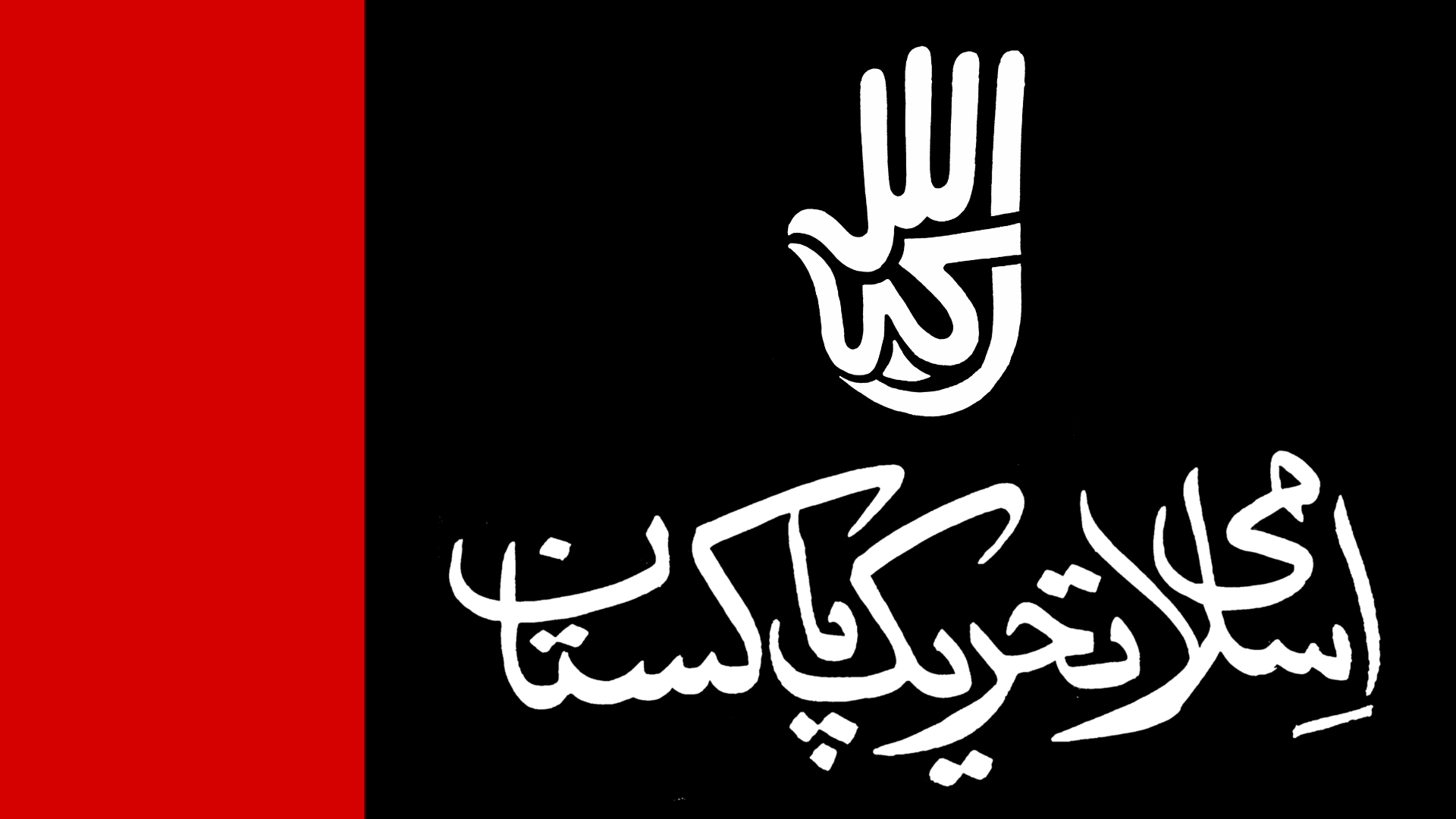
- Other flag

Website
- islamitehreekpakistan.com

Islami Tehreek Pakistan (ITP; Urdu: اسلامی تحریک پاکستان) is a Pakistani political party founded by Syed Sajid Ali Naqvi in 2012. The party's symbol are two swords. It is mostly active in the Gilgit-Baltistan region.

== History ==
Islami Tehreek Pakistan was founded in 2012. It took part in the 2015 Gilgit-Baltistan Assembly Elections. It won three seats and was the second major party in Gilgit-Baltistan before Pakistan Muslim League (N). The opposition leader Muhammad Shafi was from Islami Tehreek Pakistan at the point. It has also contested many candidates for the 2020 Gilgit-Baltistan Assembly Elections.

== Electoral history ==
=== 2015 GB Elections ===
Islami Tehreek Pakistan won three seats in the elections and one was reserved for technocrats. The reserved seat for technocrat was Muhammad Shafi who became the opposition leader at the time. ITP became the second major party in Gilgit-Baltistan.

=== 2020 GB Elections ===
For the 2020 elections, Islami Tehreek Pakistan partnered with Pakistan Tehreek-e-Insaf (PTI), and won one seat in Gilgit-Baltistan Assembly.

=== 2026 GB Elections ===
In the 2026 GB election, ITP announced its alliance with the Istehkam-e-Pakistan Party (IPP) led by Aleem Khan.
