= Shia Ulema Council =

Pakistani shiite-political organisation

Shia Ulema Council Pakistan
- شیعہ علماء کونسل پاکستان
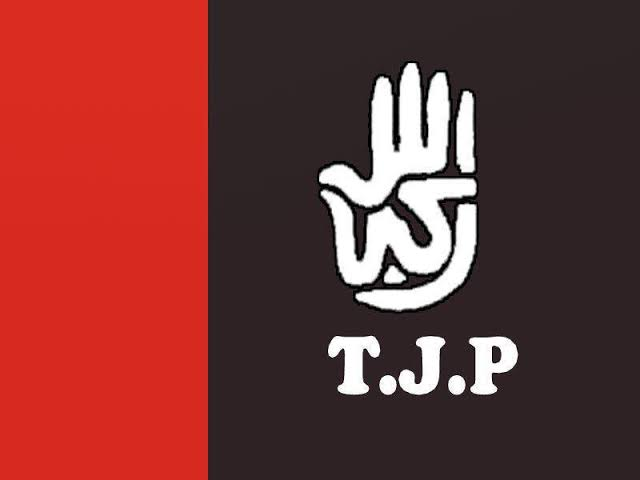
- Formation: 13 January 2002
- Purpose: Shia Islamism
- Headquarters: Islamabad, Pakistan
- Location: Pakistan
- Secretary General: Allama Shabbir Hasan Measumi
- Patron-in-Chief: Syed Sajid Ali Naqvi
- Additional Secretary General: Allama Syed Nazir Abbas Taqvi
- Deputy Secretary General: Allama Syed Sibtain Haider Sabzwari
- Affiliations: Tehreek-e-Jafaria; Islami Tehreek Pakistan
- Website: https://jafariapress.com

Shia Ulema Council (S.U.C) (Urdu: شیعہ علماء کونسل; English: Council of Shia Muslim Scholars) is a Shia Muslim religio-political organization in Pakistan and a board of Shia Muslim affiliated with the Islamic council of Iran. Its goal was to introduce Twelver Shia Islam as personal law for the Shia Muslims of Pakistan, so that no other school of thought may be forcefully imposed on them to follow. It is also known as Islami Tehreek or Tehrik-e-Jafaria in Pakistan.

== Leadership and Objectives ==
Shia Ulema Council is being led by Syed Sajid Ali Naqvi. The main objective of this party is to create an Islamic rule in the country according to the wishes of all factions of Islamic society of Pakistan.

The Shiite Muslim body of scholars, describes the scholarly education provided for Shia Muslims clergy in the schools around the center of Shia Islamic theology in Najaf, Iraq.

The main objective of this organisation was to protect the rights of Shia Muslims of Pakistan and give them a voice in the Parliament of Pakistan, they do not advocate a Shia Islamic state and have cordial relations with Sunni organization including Sunni Ittehad Council that is why they joined coalition of religious political parties i.e. Muttahida Majlis-e-Amal that won 53 out of 272 elected members in legislative elections held on 20 October 2002.

== Electoral history ==
Shia Ulema Council Pakistan participated in Election in 1988 after that Shia Ulema Council Pakistan regularly took part in elections. Shia Ulema Council Pakistan formerly Tehreek-e-Jafaria Pakistan participated in Gilgit Baltistan elections in the early 1990s and formed a government. Shia Ulema Council Pakistan formerly Tehreek-e-Jafaria Pakistan was a part of the Muttahida Majlis-e-Amal coalition of Islamist political parties that won 11.3% of the popular vote and 53 out of 272 seats in the legislative elections held on 20 October 2002.

== General Elections, 2013 ==
Election Commission of Pakistan Allot "Lock & Key" Symbol to "Islami Tehreek Pakistan" . During 2013 elections, the Shia Ulema Council Pakistan announced to allied itself with the Pakistan Peoples Party and won a number of seats, the candidates of the Pakistan Peoples Party are also representing the Shia Ulema Council Pakistan in the respective assemblies.

== Terrorist attacks on leaders, candidates & workers ==
Supreme Leader of Shia of Pakistan & President of SUC/TJP Allama Syed Arif Hussain Al Hussaini Hussaini was killed in Peshawar on 5 August 1988. After having prayed at a local Masjid, he was confronted by two gunmen and shot; The attackers escaped. Allama Arif Hussaini martyred of his wounds while being transported by ambulance to a local hospital.

=== January, 2014 ===
Muzaffargarh president of the Shia Ulema Council, Syed Altaf Hussain Bukhari, and his security guard were injured when unidentified assailants opened fire at them on 18 January 2014 at night when they were heading towards their home.

== See also ==
- Tehrik-e-Jafaria
- Majlis Wahdat-e-Muslimeen
- Imamia Students Organization
- Sipah-e-Muhammad Pakistan
