= Imamia Students Organization =

Pakistani Shiite Students Organization

Imamia Students Organization Pakistan
- امامیہ اسٹوڈنٹس آرگنائزیشن پاکستان
- "Come towards the good deed." (Arabic: حي على خير العمل)

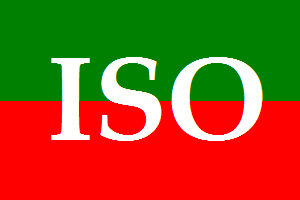
- Founded: 22 May 1972 (54 years ago)
- Founders: Dr. Shaheed Muhammad Ali Naqvi; Ayat ullah Syed Murtaza Hussain Sadar ul Fazil Molana Agha Ali Moosvi; Molana Safdar Hussain Najafi; Eng Syed Ali Raza Naqvi
- Founded at: University of Engineering & Technology, Lahore, Pakistan
- Type: Student organisation
- Headquarters: Al Mustafa House, Lahore, Pakistan
- Location: Pakistan
- Secretary General: Br. Abuzar Haider
- Supreme Leader of Iran: Ayatollah Syed Mojtaba Khamenei
- President: Br. Syed Amin al Hassan Shirazi
- Website: isopakistan.org (in English)

The Imamia Students Organization (ISO) (Urdu: امامیہ اسٹوڈنٹس آرگنائزیشن پاکستان) is a Shi'a Muslim student organization based in Pakistan. Founded on 22 May 1972, ISO promotes Islamic values, religious unity, student welfare, and ideological awareness among the youth. The organization has a significant presence in educational institutions across Pakistan and operates through a structured, tiered administrative model.

== History and Foundation ==
ISO was founded at the University of Engineering and Technology (UET), Lahore by Ayatollah Syed Murtaza Hussain Sadar ul Fazil, Molana Agha Ali Moosvi, Molana Safdar Hussain Najafi, and Muhammad Ali Naqvi (Shaheed). The founding vision was to organize Shi'a youth, particularly students, in a way that would preserve their religious identity, promote Islamic teachings, and counter secular and non-Islamic influences prevalent in educational institutions.

== Affiliations ==
Though ISO is non-political in its direct operations, it shares ideological alignment with organizations such as:

- Majlis Wahdat-e-Muslimeen (MWM)
- Shia Ulema Council
- Tehrik-e-Jafaria Pakistan (TJP)

These connections often manifest in joint religious and humanitarian events, though ISO retains an independent identity.
