= Gulbahar =

Neighbourhood in Karachi, Pakistan

Coordinates: 24.8964°N 67.02705°E

- Interactive map of Gulbahar
- Country: Pakistan
- City: Karachi

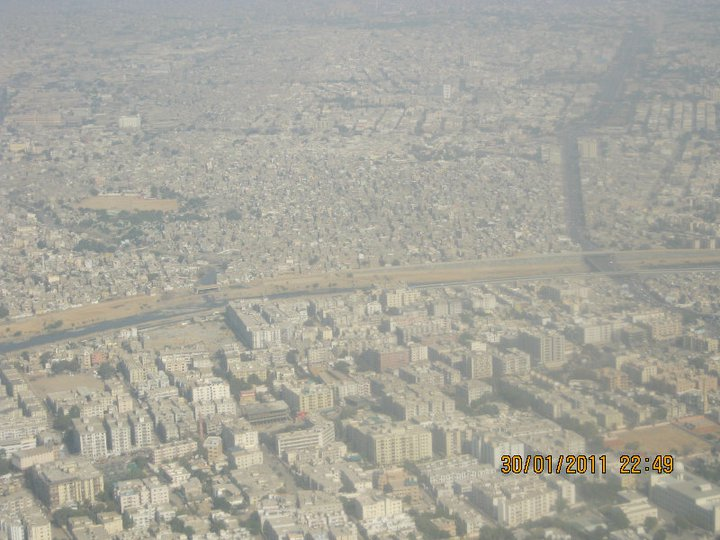
Liari Express Way, Gulbahar

Gulbahar or Gul Bahar (Urdu: گلبهار) is one of the neighborhoods of SITE Town in Karachi, Sindh, Pakistan.

Gulbahar Colony, known as Golimar, is a suburb of Karachi. This area is along the Lyari River and was mainly farmland before the settlement of Muslim refugees after the independence of Pakistan. There are several ethnic groups in Gulbahar including Urdu speakers, Sindhis, Kashmiris, Seraikis, Pakhtuns, Punjabis, Balochs, Memons. Ismaili Shia Muslims are present in large number in Gulbahar.

== Neighborhoods ==
There are following areas in Gulbahar:

- Ali Basti
- Ashrafabad
- Chowrangi Market
- Farooqabad
- Firdous Colony
- Haji Murid Goth
- Hassan Colony
- Jaffria Imambargah
- Khamosh Colony
- Lasbela
- Pasban Colony
- Qureshi Colony
- Rizvia Society
- Usmania Colony
- Waheedabad
- Zamindar Chowk

== Ismailis ==
Ismailis are present in large number in Gulbahar. Their main centres are located between Gulbahar Police Station and Lyari River.

== Sultanabad Colony ==
Sultanabad Colony No. 2, commonly known as Sultanabad Colony, is home to the Ismaili community. It has an Ismaili Jama'at Khana and an Ismaili Religious Education Centre.

== See also ==
- Golimar
- Jama'at Khana
