= GBA-7 Skardu-I =

Constituency for the Gilgit Baltistan Assembly

- Constituency for the Gilgit Baltistan Assembly
- District: Skardu District
- Electorate: 16,484

Current constituency
- Created: 2009
- Party: Pakistan People's Party
- Member: Syed Tauqeer Mehdi

GBA-7 Skardu-I is a constituency of Gilgit Baltistan Assembly which is currently being held by Syed Tauqeer Mehdi of Pakistan People's Party.

== History ==
In 2009, Syed Mehdi Shah won the constituency and became the first Gilgit Baltistan Chief Minister.

== Members ==
Election	Member	Party	Votes received
2009	Syed Mehdi Shah	Pakistan Peoples Party	6,997 votes
2015	Akbar Khan Taban	Pakistan Muslim League (N)	3,311 votes
2020	Raja Zakarya Maqoon	Pakistan Tehreek-e-Insaf	5,290 votes
2026	Syed Tauqeer Mehdi	Pakistan People's Party	4,622 votes

== Election results ==
=== 2009 ===
Syed Mehdi Shah of PPP became member of assembly by getting 6,997 votes.

2009: Skardu-I
Party	Candidate	Votes	%
PPPP	Syed Mehdi Shah	6,997	62.98
PML-Q	Prince Sher Yar Khan	1,360	12.24
MQM	Raja Zakaria Khan Maqpoon	1,276	11.49
Independent	Fida Muhammad Nashad	307	2.76
Others		1,476	13.29
Turnout		11,108	39.90
PPP win (new seat)			

=== 2015 ===
Akbar Khan Taban of Pakistan Muslim League (N) won this seat by getting 3,331 votes.

2015: Skardu-I
Party	Candidate	Votes	%
PML-N	M. Akbar Khan	3,331	28.48
PTI	Raja Jalal Hussain Maqpoon	3,330	28.47
PPPP	Syed Mehdi Shah	2,693	23.02
ITP	Gh, Shehzad Agha	925	7.91
MWM	Zahid Hussain	713	6.09
Independent	Muzzafar Hussain	265	2.27
APML	Kamal Hussain	179	1.53
Turnout		11,696	70.95
PML(N) gain from PPP		Swing	

=== 2020 ===
General elections were held on 15 November, 2020. Raja Zakaria Khan Maqpoon, a candidate of Pakistan Tehreek-e-Insaf (PTI), won the election with 5,290 votes.

=== 2026 ===
General elections were held on 7 June 2026. Syed Tauqeer Mehdi, a candidate of Pakistan People's Party (PPP), won the election with 4,622 votes.

Election 2026: GBA-7 Skardu-I
Party	Candidate	Votes	%	±%
PPP	Syed Tauqeer Mehdi	4,622	32.49	
IPP	Raja Jalal Hussain Maqpoon	4,134	29.06	
PML(N)	Muhammad Akbar Khan	3,424	24.07	
Independent	Wazir Hasnain Raza	632	4.44	
Independent	Muhammad Taqi	477	3.35	
PTI	Raja Zakaria Khan Maqpoon (Note: PTI members who contested in the general election ran as independent candidates aligned with the party because the Election Commission Gilgit-Baltistan prohibited the PTI election symbol.)	379	2.66	
Independent	Mubashir Hassan	266	1.87	
Independent	Muhammad Ilyas	197	1.38	
Others	Others (six candidates)	94	0.66	
Valid ballots		14,225	97.80	
Rejected ballots		320	2.20	
Turnout		14,545	65.95	
Majority		488	3.43	
Registered electors		22,056		
PPP gain from PTI				
