= Lasbela Bridge =

Bridge in Karachi, Pakistan

Coordinates: 24.8650°N 67.2042°E

Lasbela bridge (Urdu:پل لسبيله) is a road bridge located in the Lasbela neighbourhood of Liaquatabad Town in Karachi, Sindh, Pakistan. It spans the Lyari River and passes beneath the Lyari Expressway.

The name "Lasbela" is historically linked to the Las Bela (princely state) in present-day Balochistan. Prior to the independence of Pakistan in 1947, the ruler maintained an official residence or consular presence near the Lyari River in Karachi. As a result, the surrounding area came to be associated with it and became known as Lasbela. The bridge constructed in this locality was subsequently named Lasbela Bridge.

== See also ==
- Liaquatabad Town
- Jinnah Bridge
- Teen Hatti Bridge
- Napier Mole Bridge
- Sher Shah Bridge
