= Raja Nasir Abbas Jafri =

Member of the Senate of Pakistan from Punjab province

- راجہ ناصر عباس جعفری
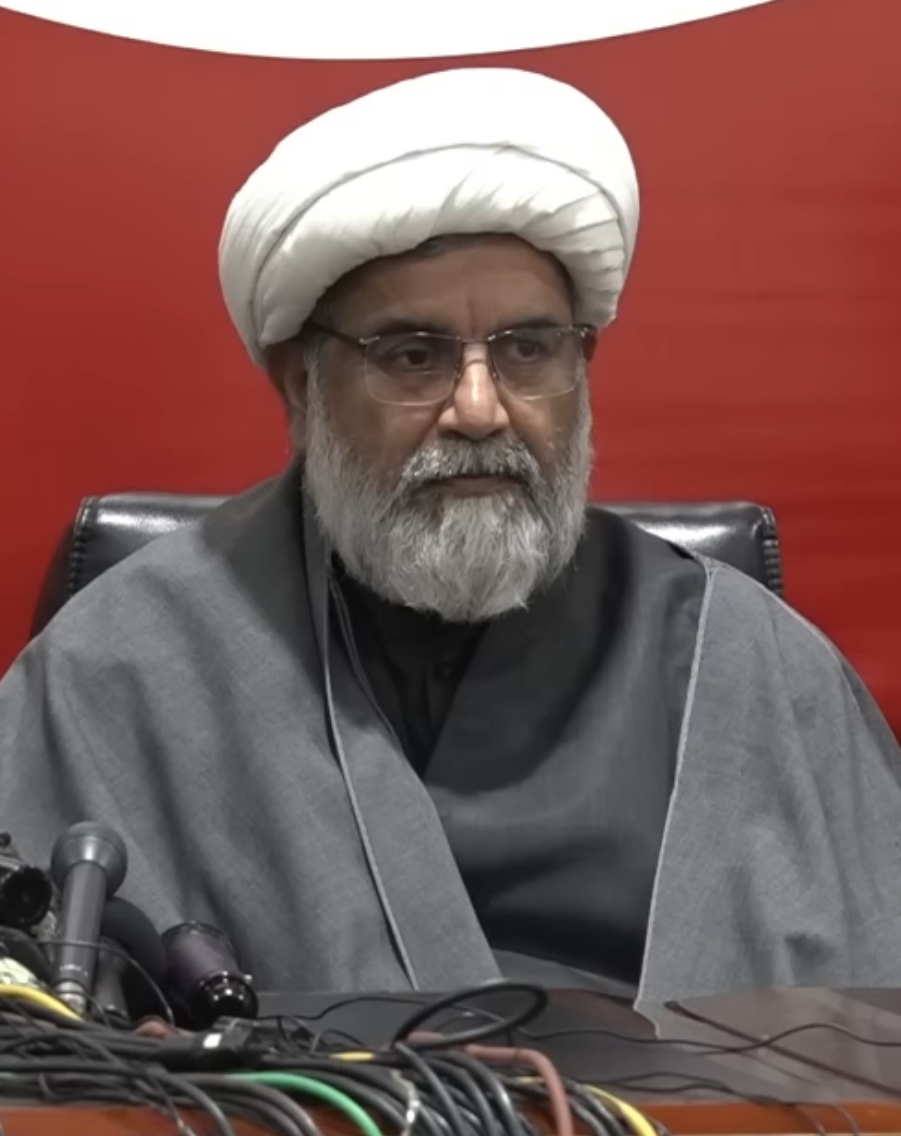

Leader of the opposition in the Senate of Pakistan
- Incumbent
- Assumed office 19 January 2026
- Preceded by: Shibli Faraz

Member of the Senate of Pakistan
- Incumbent
- Assumed office 9 April 2024
- Constituency: Punjab, Pakistan

Chairman of MWM
- Incumbent
- Assumed office 15 May 2022

Personal details
- Born: 15 September 1960 (age 66)
- Party: MWM (2009-present)
- Website: https://www.mwmpak.org

Raja Nasir Abbas Jafri (Urdu: راجہ ناصر عباس جعفری) is a Pakistani politician and member of the Senate of Pakistan from Punjab, Pakistan. He is a Shia Muslim cleric and Chairman of Muslimeen Pakistan. He is serving as the Leader of the opposition in the Senate of Pakistan nominated by Imran Khan, the Former Prime Minister of Pakistan since 19 January 2026.

== Political career ==
Jafri is a Shia Muslim cleric who advocates for good Shia-Sunni relations. He became involved in religious politics and has promoted Moderate Islam, Islamic Socialism, and Islamic Democracy, rather than terrorism or aspects of Islamic fundamentalism. Through his leadership of the Majlis Wahdat-e-Muslimeen (MWM), he has advocated for the rights of Shias in Pakistan.

Jafri has also been a staunch critic of the Tehreek-e-Taliban Pakistan (TTP), a major terrorist group, and has strongly opposed 'secret government talks' or peace talks with the TTP.

As leader of the MWM, he established positive relations with parties following other sects of Islam, particularly in 2014 when he formed a close alliance with the Sunni Ittehad Council (SIC), a Barelvi Sunni organization.

He also supported the emerging Pakistan Tehreek-e-Insaf (PTI) party led by Imran Khan in the 2013 elections, where he and Khan formed an alliance to promote peace and justice.

Jafri’s most prominent move in Pakistani politics came during the 2022-2023 political unrest when he sided with Imran Khan and the Pakistan Tehreek-e-Insaf. Since the early 2010s, he has actively protested against corruption and disunity among Pakistanis and Muslims, consistently supporting Imran Khan’s policies against corruption and rigging.

In the 2024 general election, he formed an alliance with PTI. He also noted that the selection of the Sunni Ittehad Council to represent PTI politicians rather than the MWM was not an issue, and that he, the MWM, the SIC, and the PTI were united in a bloc against corruption.

Jafri was elected unopposed from Punjab province during the 2024 Pakistani Senate election as a MWM candidate.

Jafari, along with Sunni scholars Participated in the Funeral of Hassan Nasrallah as a Pakistani representatives in Lebanon to pay condolence with Hezbollah and express support to Axis of Resistance against Israeli atrocities, His party MWM also held condolence events with various religious political parties in Pakistan across the country under the title "Ina Ala-al-Ehd," with live broadcasts of the burial ceremony from Beirut.
