= GBA-9 Skardu-III =

Constituency for the Gilgit Baltistan Assembly

- Constituency for the Gilgit Baltistan Assembly
- District: Skardu District
- Electorate: 20,559

Current constituency
- Created: 2009

GBA-9 Skardu-III is a constituency of Gilgit Baltistan Assembly which is currently vacant.

== Members ==
Election	Member	Party	Votes received
2009	Wazir Shakeel	Pakistan Peoples Party	6,432 votes
2013	Fida Muhammad Nashad	Pakistan Muslim League (N)	8,391 votes
2015	Fida Muhammad Nashad	Pakistan Muslim League (N)	6,246 votes
2020	Wazir Muhammad Saleem	Pakistan Tehreek-e-Insaf (Note: Saleem was elected as an independent, but later joined PTI.)	6,865 votes
2026	Fida Muhammad Nashad (Note: Nashad was elected to the 4th Gilgit-Baltistan Assembly, but was disqualified by the Supreme Appellate Court Gilgit-Baltistan on 9 July 2026, before he could be sworn in.)	Pakistan Peoples Party	6,578 votes

== Election results ==
=== 2009 ===
Wazir Shakil Ahmed of PPP became member of assembly by getting 6,432 votes.

=== 2013 by-election ===
A by-election was held on 6 October 2013 due to Wazir Shakil Ahmed, the previous member from this seat, being appointed as a judge. Fida Muhammad Nashad, a candidate of Pakistan Muslim League (N) (PML(N)), won the election with 8,391 votes.

=== 2015 ===
Fida Muhammad Nashad of PML(N) won this seat by getting 6,246 votes.

2015: Skardu-III
Party	Candidate	Votes	%
PML-N	Fida Muhammad Nashad	6,246	50.10
MWM	Wazir Muhammad Saleem	5,554	44.55
PPP	Ghulam Raza Haidri	462	3.71
ITP	Syed Mohammad Abbas Rizvi	48	0.39
PTI	Ali Kazim	13	0.10
APML	Syed Abbas Almosvi	13	0.10
Turnout		12,467	60.64
PML(N) gain from PPP		Swing	

=== 2020 ===
General elections were held on 15 November 2020. Wazir Muhammad Saleem, an independent candidate, won the election with 6,865 votes. He later joined Pakistan Tehreek-e-Insaf (PTI).

Fida Muhammad Nashad of PML(N) won this seat by getting 6,246 votes.

2020: Skardu-III
Party	Candidate	Votes	%	
Ind	Wazir Saleem	6,626	50.10	
PTI	Fida Nashad	5,518	45	
PPP	Wazir Waqar Ali	1,894		
Turnout		14000	60	10
Independent gain from PTI		Swing		

=== 2026 ===
General elections were held on 7 June 2026. Fida Muhammad Nashad, a candidate of Pakistan People's Party (PPP), won the election with 6,578 votes.

Election 2026: GBA-9 Skardu-III
Party	Candidate	Votes	%	±%
PPP	Fida Muhammad Nashad	6,578	39.06	
Independent	Wazir Muhammad Saleem	6,353	37.73	
PML(N)	Ajmal Hussain	2,718	16.14	
MWM	Wazir Azhar Mehdi	1,094	6.50	
Others	Others (eight candidates)	97	0.58	
Valid ballots		16,840	95.56	
Rejected ballots		782	4.44	
Turnout		17,622	52.37	
Majority		225	1.34	
Registered electors		33,649		
PPP gain from Independent				

Nashad was inititally barred from contesting the election by the returning officer for concealing his assets. This decision was upheld by an election tribunal, but after a successful challenge in the Gilgit-Baltistan Chief Court (GBCC), Nashad was allowed to run. After the election, Zakir Hussain, an unsuccessful independent candidate who tied for seventh place, went to the Supreme Appellate Court Gilgit-Baltistan (SACGB) challenged Nashad's eligibility to become a member of the Assembly. On 9 July 2026, the SACGB set aside the GBCC's order and disqualified Nashad. As a result, although being elected to the 4th Assembly of Gilgit-Baltistan, he did not take oath as a member.

=== 2026 by-election ===
A by-election was held on 5 September 2026 due to the disqualification of Fida Muhammad Nashad, the previous winner from this seat. Akhtar Abbas, a candidate of PPP and Nashad's son, won the by-election with 8,399 votes.

By-election 2026: GBA-9 Skardu-III
Party	Candidate	Votes	%	±%
PPP	Akhtar Abbas	8,500	49.17	▲10.11
Independent	Wazir Muhammad Saleem	8,370	48.38	▲9.65
PML(N)	Ajmal Hussain	444	2.60	▼13.54
Others	Others (ten candidates)	145	0.85	
Valid ballots		17,082	98.38	
Rejected ballots		281	1.62	
Turnout		17,363	51.79	▼0.58
Majority		305	1.79	▲0.45
Registered electors		33,526		
PPP hold				
