= Super Market =

Super Market may refer to:

- Super Market (Karachi)
- Super Market (Islamabad)

== See also ==
- Supermarket
