= Hameed Hussain =

Member of the National Assembly of Pakistan from Kurram (2024–2029)

- حمید حسین

Member of the National Assembly of Pakistan
- Incumbent
- Assumed office 29 February 2024
- Constituency: NA-37 Kurram

Personal details
- Party: MWM (2024-present)

Hameed Hussain (Urdu: حمید حسین), is a Pakistani politician who has been a member of the National Assembly of Pakistan since February 2024.

== Political career ==
Hussain won the 2024 Pakistani general election seat from NA-37 Kurram as a Majlis Wahdat-e-Muslimeen candidate. He received 58,650 votes while runners up Sajid Hussain Turi of Pakistan People’s Party Parliamentarians received 54,384 votes.
