= Tehreek Tahafuz Ayin =

Big-tent opposition alliance in Pakistan led by Pakistan Tehreek-e-Insaf

Tehreek Tahafuz Ayin e Pakistan تحریک تحفظ آئین
- Abbreviation: TTAP
- Leader: Mahmood Khan Achakzai
- Founded: 13 April 2024; 2 years ago
- Ideology: Populism
- Political position: Big tent

The Tehreek-e-Tahafuz-e-Ayeen-e-Pakistan (TTAP; Urdu: تحریک تحفظ آئین پاکستان, lit. 'Movement for the Protection of the Constitution of Pakistan'), sometimes called Tehreek Tahafuz Ayin, is a big tent political alliance of several political parties in Pakistan led by the Pakistan Tehreek-e-Insaf (PTI) founder Imran Khan, the largest party in the alliance, and is under the leadership of Mahmood Khan Achakzai. Currently, it consists of various parties that protest against alleged electoral fraud in the 2024 Pakistani general elections and to oppose the Second Shehbaz Sharif government.

== History ==
=== Formation ===
The alliance was founded after the 2024 Pakistani general elections, which were marred by allegations of rigging, vote fraud, manipulation and misconduct. Primarily, the PTI led the opposition movement and protested against alleged rigging in the elections, but soon invited many political parties to join its ranks. The PTI invited its long time close allies, the SIC led by Sahibzada Hamid Raza, the MWM led by Raja Nasir Abbas Jafri and the GDA led by Sindh-based leadership to protest against the Shehbaz Sharif government, due to it being ‘sitting on a stolen mandate.’

The PTI announced an alliance with Mahmood Khan Achakzai and his PkMAP to contest the validity of the election results. In Balochistan, the BNP(M) led by Akhtar Mengal criticized the government for its mishandling of the elections and formed an alliance with the PTI. Furthermore, the JI and the JUI(F) reported rigging. With these several parties forming a large opposition alliance led by the PTI, on Saturday, 13 April 2024, Omar Ayub announced the formation of the ‘Movement for the Protection of the Constitution’ alongside Akhtar Mengal and Mahmood Khan Achakzai. The movement was founded following several opposition meetings between parties which were mediated by Asad Qaiser, a PTI senior member.

The JUI(F) has not joined the alliance, despite being invited by PTI senior leaders Omar Ayub and Asad Qaiser, with JUI(F) leader Maulana Fazlur Rehman saying he sought guarantees prior to joining. In May 2024, JUI(F) and PTI agreed to launch a joint movement.

Other parties in February 2024 such as the Pashtunkhwa Milli Awami Party (PkMAP), Balochistan National Party-Mengal (BNP-M), the National Party (NP), and the Hazara Democratic Party (HDP) have led protests in Balochistan unrelated to the TTAP alliance.

=== Protests ===
In April 2024 the alliance began protests in Pishin, Balochistan, saying it would start a nation-wide drive. The Grand Democratic Alliance (GDA) and to a lesser extent, the Jamaat-e-Islami Pakistan (JIP) ran protests in Sindh two months prior in February.

In July 2025, TTAP leader Mahmood Khan Achakzai offered to hold talks with the prime minister Shehbaz Sharif for the formation of a unity government, saying it was "not the time to hurl abuses at each other but to unite for the country's sake". He also criticized the election commission's and judiciary's treatment of PTI.

== Member parties ==
Name		Flag	Leader	Main ideology	Political Position	Symbol
PTI	Pakistan Tehreek-e-Insaf		Imran Khan; Gohar Ali Khan	Big tent Populism	Centrism	Bat
PkMAP	Pashtunkhwa Milli Awami Party		Mahmood Khan Achakzai	Pashtun nationalism Regionalism; Left-wing populism	Centre-left politics to Left-wing politics	Tree
BNP(M)	Balochistan National Party (Mengal)		Akhtar Mengal	Baloch nationalism Democratic socialism Left-wing populism	Left-wing politics	Axe
SIC	Sunni Ittehad Council		Sahibzada Hamid Raza	Barelvism; Sunni Islam Islamism	Right-wing politics	Horse
MWM	Majlis Wahdat-e-Muslimeen		Raja Nasir Abbas Jafri	Islam and democracy Islamic socialism	Centre-right politics	Tent
GDA	Grand Democratic Alliance		Pir of Pagaro VIII	Anti-PPP; Regionalism	Big tent	Star
RJUI	Rabita Jamiat Ulema-e-Islam		Shuja ul Mulk	Islamism		Ring
