= Syed Amjad Ali Zaidi =

Pakistani politician from Gilgit-Baltistan

- سید امجد علی زیدی

Speaker of the Gilgit Baltistan Assembly
- In office 25 November 2020 – 7 June 2023
- Governor: Raja Jalal Hussain Maqpoon; Syed Mehdi Shah
- Deputy: Nazir Ahmed
- Preceded by: Haji Fida Muhammad Nashad
- Succeeded by: Nazir Ahmed

Member of the Gilgit Baltistan Assembly
- In office 25 November 2020 – 24 November 2025
- Preceded by: Iqbal Hassan
- Succeeded by: Iqbal Hassan
- Constituency: GBA-11 (Kharmang-I)

Provincial Minister of Housing
- In office 18 July 2023 – 24 November 2025
- Chief Minister: Gulbar Khan

Personal details
- Party: ITP (2026-present)
- Other party: PPP (2025-2026); PTI (2020-2025)

Syed Amjad Ali Zaidi is a Pakistani politician who had been the Speaker of the Gilgit Baltistan Assembly from November 2020 to June 2023. He has also been a member of the Gilgit Baltistan Assembly from November 2020 to November 2025.

== Political career ==
Zaidi contested the 2015 Gilgit-Baltistan Assembly election from GBA-11 Skardu-V as a candidate of Pakistan Tehreek-e-Insaf (PTI), but was unsuccessful. He received 4,985 votes and was defeated by Iqbal Hassan, a candidate of Pakistan Muslim League (N) (PML(N)).

He was elected to the Gilgit-Baltistan Assembly in the 2020 Gilgit-Baltistan Assembly election on 15 November 2020 from GBA-11 Kharmang as a candidate of PTI. He won the election by the margin of 3,945 votes over the runner-up Iqbal Hassan, an independent. He garnered 6,604 votes while Hussain received 2,659 votes.

He received eighteen votes to be elected as the Speaker of the Gilgit Baltistan Assembly on 25 November 2020, while his opponent, Ghulam Muhammad received only eight votes.

Even though agreeing to resign from the Speaker's office after two and a half years to allow the Deputy Speaker, Nazir Ahmed, to become Speaker, Zaidi refused to resign. As a result, a no-confidence motion against him was presented by provincial ministers Javed Ali Manwa and Raja Zakaria Khan Maqpoon. Zaidi ceased to be Speaker after the motion succeeded with 21 votes while only a single vote, which was Zaidi's, was cast against the motion. He was succeeded by Nazir Ahmed after the latter was elected unopposed.

His party membership was terminated on 8 September 2025.

He joined the Pakistan People's Party (PPP) on 5 December 2025.

He was not nominated as the PPP candidate for GBA-11 Kharmang and as a result, joined Islami Tehreek Pakistan (ITP) on 10 April 2026.

He contested the 2026 Gilgit Baltistan Assembly election from GBA-11 Kharmang as a candidate of ITP, but was unsuccessful. He received 2,339 votes, placing fourth, and was defeated by Iqbal Hassan, a candidate of PPP.
