= Wazir Muhammad Saleem =

Pakistani politician from Gilgit-Baltistan

- وزیر محمد سلیم

Member of the Gilgit Baltistan Assembly
- In office 25 November 2020 – 24 November 2025
- Preceded by: Fida Muhammad Nashad
- Succeeded by: Akhtar Abbas
- Constituency: GBA-9 (Skardu-III)

Personal details
- Born: Mehdi Abad
- Party: Independent (2026-present; 2020)
- Other political affiliations: Pakistan Tehreek-e-Insaf (2020-2026); Majlis Wahdat-e-Muslimeen (2015-2020)

Wazir Muhammad Saleem is a Pakistani politician who has been a member of the Gilgit Baltistan Assembly from November 2020 to November 2025.

== Political career ==
Saleem contested the 2015 Gilgit-Baltistan Assembly election from GBA-9 Skardu-III as a candidate of Majlis Wahdat-e-Muslimeen (MWM), but was unsuccessful. He received 5,730 votes and was defeated by Fida Muhammad Nashad, a candidate of Pakistan Muslim League (N) (PML(N)).

He contested the 2020 Gilgit-Baltistan Assembly election on 15 November 2020 from GBA-9 Skardu-III as an Independent candidate. He won the election by the margin of 1,099 votes over the runner up Fida Muhammad Nashad of Pakistan Tehreek-e-Insaf (PTI). He garnered 6,286 votes while Nashad received 5,187 votes. After winning the election, Saleem joined PTI.

He contested the 2026 Gilgit Baltistan Assembly election from GBA-9 Skardu-III as an independent candidate, but was unsuccessful. He received 6,353 votes and was defeated by Fida Muhammad Nashad, a candidate of Pakistan People's Party (PPP).

He contested a September 2026 by-election from GBA-9 Skardu-III as an independent candidate, but was unsuccessful. He received 8,094 votes and was defeated by Akhtar Abbas, a candidate of PPP.
