= GBA-11 Kharmang =

Constituency for the Gilgit Baltistan Assembly

- Constituency for the Gilgit Baltistan Assembly
- District: Kharmang District
- Electorate: 21,941

Current constituency
- Created: 2009
- Party: Pakistani People's Party
- Member: Iqbal Hassan
- Created from: GBA-11 Skardu-V

GBA-11 Kharmang is a constituency of Gilgit Baltistan Assembly which is currently represented by Iqbal Hassan of Pakistan People's Party (PPP).

== Members ==
Election	Member	Party	Votes received
2009	Syed Muhammad Ali Shah Rizvi	Pakistan Peoples Party	3,145 votes
2015	Iqbal Hassan	Pakistan Muslim League (N)	5,165 votes
2020	Syed Amjad Ali Zaidi	Pakistan Tehreek-e-Insaf	6,858 votes
2026	Iqbal Hassan	Pakistan People's Party	6,143 votes

== Election results ==
=== 2009 ===
Syed Muhammad Ali Shah Rizvi of PPP became member of assembly by getting 3,145 votes.

=== 2015 ===
Iqbal Hassan of PML-N won this seat by getting 5,165 votes.

2015: Skardu-V
Party	Candidate	Votes	%
PML-N	Iqbal Hassan	5,165	40.86
PTI	Syed Amjad Ali Zaidi	4,985	39.44
MWM	Shujaat Hussain Mesam	2,424	19.18
Independent	Kazim Saleem	24	0.19
ITP	Syed Akbar Shah	18	0.14
APML	Muzaffar Hussain	12	0.09
PPP	Niaz Ali	9	0.07
Independent	Ghulam Muhhamd Parvi	3	0.02
Turnout		12,640	57.61
PML(N) gain from PPP		Swing	

=== 2020 ===
General elections were held on 15 November 2020. Syed Amjad Ali Zaidi, a candidate of Pakistan Tehreek-e-Insaf (PTI), won the election with 6,898 votes.

=== 2026 ===
General elections were held on 7 June 2026. Iqbal Hassan, a candidate of Pakistan People's Party (PPP) won the election with 6,143 votes.

Election 2026: GBA-11 Kharmang
Party	Candidate	Votes	%	±%
PPP	Iqbal Hassan	6,143	34.10	
PML(N)	Syed Mohsin Rizvi	4,847	26.91	
Independent	Shujaat Hussain	3,673	20.39	
ITP	Syed Amjad Ali Zaidi	2,339	12.99	
PTI	Syed Mohsin Zaidi (Note: PTI members who contested in the general election ran as independent candidates aligned with the party because the Election Commission Gilgit-Baltistan prohibited the PTI election symbol.)	844	4.69	
Others	Others (six candidates)	167	0.93	
Valid ballots		18,013	96.74	
Rejected ballots		607	3.26	
Turnout		18,620	53.71	
Majority		1,296	7.19	
Registered electors		34,670		
PPP gain from PTI				
