= Qasimabad, Karachi =

Neighborhood of Karachi, Pakistan

Coordinates: 24.902°N 67.058°E

Qasimabad is a neighborhood in the Karachi Central District of Karachi, Pakistan. It was previously a part of Liaquatabad Town, which was disbanded in 2011.
