= Iqbal Hassan (Pakistani politician) =

Pakistani politician from Gilgit-Baltistan

- اقبال حسن

Member of the Gilgit-Baltistan Assembly
- Incumbent
- Assumed office 22 June 2026
- Preceded by: Syed Amjad Ali Zaidi
- Constituency: GBA-11 Kharmang
- In office 24 June 2015 – 23 June 2020
- Succeeded by: Syed Amjad Ali Zaidi
- Constituency: GBA-11 Skardu-V

Personal details
- Party: Pakistan People's Party (2026-present)
- Other political affiliations: Independent (2009; 2020); Pakistan Muslim League (N) (2015-2020)

Iqbal Hassan is a Pakistani politician who has served as a member of the Gilgit-Baltistan Assembly since June 2026, and previously served in this role from June 2015 to June 2020.

== Political career ==
Hassan contested the 2009 Gilgit-Baltistan Assembly election from GBA-11 Skardu-V as an independent canddiate, but was unsuccessful. He received 1,745 votes, placing third, and was defeated by Syed Muhammad Ali Shah, a candidate of Pakistan People's Party (PPP).

He was elected to the Gilgit-Baltistan Assembly from GBA-11 Skardu-V as a candidate of Pakistan Muslim League (N) (PML(N)). He received 5,184 votes and defeated Syed Amjad Ali Zaidi, a candidate of Pakistan Tehreek-e-Insaf (PTI).

He contested the 2020 Gilgit-Baltistan Assembly election from GBA-11 Kharmang as an independent candidate, but was unsuccessful. He received 2,659 votes and was defeated by Syed Amjad Ali Zaidi, a candidate of PTI.

He was re-elected to the Gilgit-Baltistan Assembly from GBA-11 Kharmang as a candidate of PPP in the 2026 Gilgit Baltistan Assembly election. He received 6,143 votes and defeated Syed Mohsin Rizvi, a candidate of PML(N).

On 27 July 2026, he was sworn into the cabinet of Chief Minister Amjad Hussain Azar as the Minister for Health.
