= Nazir Ahmed (Gilgit-Baltistan politician) =

Pakistani politician from Gilgit-Baltistan

- نذیر احمد

Speaker of the Gilgit Baltistan Assembly
- In office 7 June 2023 – 22 June 2026
- Governor: Syed Mehdi Shah
- Deputy: Sadia Danish
- Preceded by: Syed Amjad Ali Zaidi
- Succeeded by: Imran Nadeem

Member of the Gilgit Baltistan Assembly
- In office 25 November 2020 – 24 November 2025
- Preceded by: Fida Khan
- Succeeded by: Abdul Jahan
- Constituency: GBA-20 Ghizer-II

Deputy Speaker of the Gilgit Baltistan Assembly
- In office 25 November 2020 – 7 June 2023
- Speaker: Syed Amjad Ali Zaidi
- Preceded by: Jafarullah Khan
- Succeeded by: Sadia Danish

Personal details
- Party: PPP (2026-present)
- Other political affiliations: PTI (2020-2026)

Nazir Ahmed is a Pakistani politician who is the Speaker of the Gilgit Baltistan Assembly since June 2023. He had also been a member of the Gilgit Baltistan Assembly from November 2020 to November 2025. Prior to being elected Speaker, he served as the Deputy Speaker from November 2020 to June 2023.

== Political career ==
Ahmed contested the 2015 Gilgit-Baltistan Assembly election from GBA-20 Ghizer-II as an independent candidate, but was unsuccessful. He received 1,643 votes and was defeated by Fida Khan, an independent candidate.

He contested in the 2020 Gilgit-Baltistan Assembly election on 15 November 2020 from GBA-20 Ghizer-II on the ticket of the Pakistan Tehreek-e-Insaf (PTI). He won the election by a margin of 1,767 votes over the runner-up Khan Akbar Khan of the Pakistan Muslim League (Q) (PML(Q)). He garnered 5,582 votes while Khan received 3,815 votes.

He received twenty-two votes to be elected as the Deputy Speaker of the Gilgit Baltistan Assembly on 25 November 2020, while his opponent, Rehmat Khaliq, only revived nine votes.

On 7 June 2023, after a successful no-confidence motion against Syed Amjad Ali Zaidi, the then Speaker of the Gilgit Baltistan Assembly, Ahmed was elected as the new Speaker, unopposed.

On 24 April 2026, he left the PTI and joined the Pakistan People's Party (PPP).

He contested the 2026 Gilgit Baltistan Assembly election from GBA-20 Ghizer-II as a candidate of PPP, but was unsuccessful. He received 7,034 votes and was defeated by Abdul Jahan, a candidate of Pakistan Muslim League (N) (PML(N)).
