= NA-37 Kurram =

Constituency of the National Assembly of Pakistan

- Constituency for the National Assembly of Pakistan
- Region: Kurram District
- Electorate: 415,537

Current constituency
- Party: Majlis Wahdat-e-Muslimeen
- Member: Hameed Hussain
- Created from: NA-37 Tribal Area-II

NA-37 Kurram (این اے-37، کرم) is a constituency for the National Assembly of Pakistan mainly comprising Upper Kurram Subdivision of Kurram District in Khyber Pakhtunkhwa.

== Members of Parliament ==
=== 2002–2024: NA-37 Tribal Area-II ===
Election	Member	Party
2002	Doctor Sayed Javaid Hussain Mian	Independent
2008	Sajid Hussain Turi	Independent
2013	Sajid Hussain Turi	Independent

=== 2018: NA-46 Tribal Area-VII ===
Election	Member	Party
2018	Sajid Hussain	PPP

=== 2024: NA-37 Kurram ===
Election	Member	Party
2024	Hameed Hussain	MWM

== Election 2002 ==
General elections were held on 10 October 2002. Dr Sayed Javaid Hussain Mian an independent candidate won by 21,053 votes.

== Election 2008 ==
The result of general election 2008 in this constituency is given below.

=== Result ===
Sajid Hussain Turi succeeded in the election 2008 and became the member of National Assembly.

General Election 2008: Tribal Area-II
Party	Candidate	Votes	%
Independent	Sajid Hussain Turi	26,287	30
Independent	Doctor Syed Riaz Hussain	20,793	24
Independent	Syed Sajjad Hussain	20,267	23
Others	Others	19,743	23

== Election 2013 ==
General elections were held on 11 May 2013. Sajid Hussain an independent candidate won by 30,524 votes and became the member of National Assembly.

== Election 2018 ==
General elections were held on 25 July 2018.

General election 2018: NA-46 Tribal Area-VII
Party	Candidate	Votes	%	±%
PPP	Sajid Hussain Turi	21,461	29.26	
PTI	Syed Iqbal Mian	16,934	23.09	
Independent	Syed Irshad Hussain	16,933	23.09	
Independent	Ibrar Hussain	12,227	16.67	
Others	Others (twenty-one candidates)	5,782	7.89	
Turnout		74,472	43.17	
Total valid votes		73,337	98.48	
Rejected ballots		1,135	1.52	
Majority		4,527	6.17	
Registered electors		172,497		
PPP gain from Independent				

== Election 2024 ==
General elections were held on 8 February 2024. Hameed Hussain won the election with 58,661 votes.

General election 2024: NA-37 Kurram
Party	Candidate	Votes	%	±%
MWM	Hameed Hussain	58,661	38.18	▲38.14
PPP	Sajid Hussain Turi	54,792	35.66	▲6.40
JUI (F)	Asmat Ullah	24,892	16.20	N/A
Independent	Jamil Khan	10,868	7.07	
Others	Others (thirty candidates)	4,426	7.89	
Turnout		156,941	37.77	▼5.40
Total valid votes		153,639	97.90	
Rejected ballots		3,302	2.10	
Majority		3,869	2.52	
Registered electors		415,537		
MWM gain from PPP				

== See also ==
- NA-36 Hangu-cum-Orakzai
- NA-38 Karak
