= GBA-20 Ghizer-II =

Constituency for the Gilgit Baltistan Assembly

- Constituency for the Gilgit Baltistan Assembly
- District: Ghizer District
- Electorate: 34,400

Current constituency
- Created: 2009
- Party: Pakistan Muslim League (N)
- Member: Abdul Jahan

GBA-20 Ghizer-II s a constituency of Gilgit Baltistan Assembly which is currently represented by Abdul Jahan of Pakistan Muslim League (N) (PML(N)).

== History ==
The constituency was GBA-20 (Ghizer-II). In 2019, Gupis–Yasin was made a district.

== Members ==
Election	Member	Party	Votes
2009	Ali Madad Sher	Pakistan Peoples Party	3,206 votes
2015	Fida Khan	Pakistan Muslim League (N) (Note: Fida Khan was elected as an independent, but later joined PML(N).)	4,991 votes
2020	Nazir Ahmed	Pakistan Tehreek-e-Insaf	5,582 votes
2026	Abdul Jahan	Pakistan Muslim League (N)	7,153 votes

== Election results ==
=== 2009 ===
Ali Madad Sher of PPP became member of assembly by getting 3,206 votes.

=== 2015 ===
Fida Khan, an Independent politician won this seat by getting 4,991 votes. He later joined Pakistan Muslim League (N) (PML(N)).

2015: Ghizer-II
Party	Candidate	Votes	%
Independent	Fida Khan	4,991	22.87
PML-N	Sultan Madad	3,362	15.41
Independent	Nadir Khan	2,423	11.10
PPP	Ali Madad Sher	2,048	9.39
Independent	Abdul Karim	1,835	8.41
Independent	Nazir Ahmed	1,643	7.53
APML	Noor Wali Khan	1,529	7.01
PTI	Atta-ur-Rehman	1,286	5.89
Independent	Farman Wali	1,060	4.86
Independents & Others		1,643	7.53
Turnout		21,820	63.43
Registered electors		34,400	
Independent gain from PPP		Swing	

=== 2020 ===
General elections were held on 15 November 2020. Nazir Ahmed, a candidate of Pakistan Tehreek-e-Insaf (PTI), won the election with 5,582 votes.

=== 2026 ===
General elections were held on 7 June 2026. Abdul Jahan, a candidate of Pakistan Muslim League (N) (PML(N)), won the election with 7,153 votes.

Election 2026: GBA-20 Ghizer-II
Party	Candidate	Votes	%	±%
PML(N)	Abdul Jahan	7,153	24.01	
PPP	Nazir Ahmed	7,034	23.61	
Independent	Safdar Ali Sherazi	6,765	22.70	
PTI	Nadeem Ali (Note: PTI members who contested in the general election ran as independent candidates aligned with the party because the Election Commission Gilgit-Baltistan prohibited the PTI election symbol.)	2,642	8.87	
Independent	Musa Madad	2,543	8.53	
Independent	Noor Wali Khan	1,147	3.85	
JUI (F)	Syed Ikram ul Haq	700	2.35	
IPP	Khan Akbar Khan	596	2.00	
Independent	Arifullah	586	1.97	
PML(Q)	Bakhtawar Shah	298	1.00	
Pakistan Nazriyati Party	Islamud Din	202	0.68	
Others	Others (six candidates)	130	0.44	
Valid ballots		29,796	98.75	
Rejected ballots		376	1.25	
Turnout		30,172	57.22	
Majority		119	0.40	
Registered electors		52,733		
PML(N) gain from PTI				
