= Deportation of Rasha Alawieh =

Lebanese nephrologist deported by US CBP

Rasha Alawieh is a Lebanese assistant professor at Brown University. She was denied re-entry to the United States in March 2025 and deported to Lebanon, despite having a H-1B visa. U.S. Department of Defense officials justified Alawieh's denial for re-entry after "sympathetic photos and videos" of Hezbollah leader Hasan Nasrallah, Iran’s supreme leader Ali Khamenei, and Hezbollah militants were found "in her cell phone's deleted items folder", and may have been emailed by Alawieh from her phone.

A court order temporarily blocking her removal from Massachusetts was issued, but the government said that officers did not receive it until after her plane had departed. Some of the court documents remain sealed.

A U.S. Homeland Security spokeswoman said that upon being questioned Alawieh “openly admitted” her support for Nasrallah. The spokeswoman added that: "A visa is a privilege, not a right. Glorifying and supporting terrorists who kill Americans is grounds for visa issuance to be denied.” A spokeswoman for U.S. Customs and Border Protection also emphasized that a visa does not guarantee entry, and that "anyone found with extremist materials linked to a U.S.-designated terrorist group will be removed" or rendered inadmissible to the United States.

== Biography ==
Rasha Alawieh was born in 1990. She is a Lebanese transplant nephrologist who had worked as an assistant professor at Brown University. She is a Shia Muslim.

Alawieh obtained her medical degree from the American University of Beirut in 2015 and completed her residency at the AUB Medical Center in 2018. That year, she obtained a J-1 visa to enter the United States and completed fellowships at Ohio State University and the University of Washington. She completed the Yale Waterbury Internal Medicine Program in June 2024, the same month the United States government approved Alawieh's petition for an H-1B visa, sponsored by Brown Medicine. This visa was issued at the Lebanese consulate on March 11, 2025, and was valid through mid-2027.

== Denial of entry ==
Alawieh visited Lebanon in February 2025 to see relatives. While in Lebanon, she attended the funeral of Hassan Nasrallah, the former leader of Hezbollah. Hezbollah has been deemed a designated terrorist organization by the United States Department of State. On March 14, 2025, Alawieh had returned to the U.S. on a flight landing at Logan International Airport in Boston. She was detained at the airport. In her airport re-entry interview, she said she attended the funeral because of Nasrallah's religious position in the Shia community. She said her family in Lebanon was not in Hezbollah, but supported it. Alawieh admitted during questioning that she had sent some images of Hezbollah members.

That same day, her cousin, Yara Chehab, filed a petition alleging that Customs and Border Protection (CBP) was unlawfully detaining Alawieh "without any justification and without permitting them access to their counsel" for at least 36 hours after traveling to Lebanon to see relatives.

That evening, U.S. District Judge Leo Sorokin issued orders barring Alawieh's removal from Massachusetts without 48 hours notice to the court and scheduling for her to be brought to a hearing on March 17. Alawieh's attorney said that in violation of this order she was sent on a flight to Paris and was back in Lebanon on March 16. A lawyer with the firm working for Chehab said that she went to the airport on March 15 and told a CBP officer about the order before Alawieh's flight departed. Sorokin filed a second order that morning saying there was reason to believe CBP had willfully disobeyed his previous order and directed the government to provide a response ahead of the scheduled hearing.

A government lawyer said that officers did not receive the court order until after Alawieh had left the country, and submitted a sworn statement to that effect to the court from the CBP supervisor who had been on duty when she was deported.

On March 17, U.S. Department of Defense officials justified Alawieh's denial for re-entry due "sympathetic photos and videos" of Nasrallah, Ali Khamenei, and Hezbollah militants were found "in her cell phone's deleted items folder". A U.S. Homeland Security spokeswoman said that upon being questioned Alawieh, “openly admitted” her support for Nasrallah. She added that: "A visa is a privilege not a right. Glorifying and supporting terrorists who kill Americans is grounds for visa issuance to be denied.

== Reactions ==
In March 2025, the White House social media posted a photo of Donald Trump waving from a drive-thru window that was taken during his campaign stop at a Philadelphia McDonald's, with the statement, “Bye-bye Rasha” and a waving emoji, in a post widely interpreted to be mocking Alawieh.

Brown University advised all of its international community members to postpone travel, saying it was waiting for additional information from the US Department of State.

The Council on American–Islamic Relations (CAIR), a Muslim civil rights and advocacy group, called on the Trump administration to readmit Alawieh, stating "Deporting lawful immigrants like Dr. Alawieh without any basis undermines the rule of law and reinforces suspicion that our immigration system is turning into an anti-Muslim, white supremacist institution that seeks to expel and turn away as many Muslims and people of color as possible".
