= Abdul Jahan =

Pakistani politician from Gilgit-Baltistan

- عبد الجہاں

Member of the Gilgit-Baltistan Assembly
- Incumbent
- Assumed office 22 June 2026
- Preceded by: Nazir Ahmed
- Constituency: GBA-20 Ghizer-II

Minister for Education and Public Works, Gilgit-Baltistan
- In office 1 July 2020 – 1 December 2020
- Chief Minister: Mir Afzal

Minister for Food, Gilgit-Baltistan
- In office 24 January 2015 – 26 June 2015
- Chief Minister: Sher Jehan Mir

Personal details
- Party: Pakistan Muslim League (N)

Abdul Jahan Qarabash is a Pakistani politician who has served as a member of the Gilgit-Baltistan Assembly since June 2026.

== Political career ==
Qarabash served in the caretaker cabinet of Chief Minister Sher Jehan Mir as the Minister for Food.

He also served in the caretaker cabinet of Chief Minister Mir Afzal as the Minister for Education and Public Works.

He was elected to the Gilgit-Baltistan Assembly from GBA-20 Ghizer-II as a candidate of Pakistan Muslim League (N) (PML(N)) in the 2026 Gilgit Baltistan Assembly election. He received 7,153 votes and defeated Nazir Ahmed, a candidate of PPP.
