= Syed Tauqeer Mehdi =

Pakistani politician from Gilgit-Baltistan

- سید توقیر مہدی

Member of the Gilgit-Baltistan Assembly
- Incumbent
- Assumed office 22 June 2026
- Preceded by: Raja Zakaria Khan Maqpoon
- Constituency: GBA-7 Skardu-I

Personal details
- Party: Pakistan People's Party
- Parent: Syed Mehdi Shah (father)

Syed Tauqeer Mehdi is a Pakistani politician who has served as a member of the Gilgit-Baltistan Assembly since June 2026. He is the son of Syed Mehdi Shah, the current Governor and former Chief Minister of Gilgit-Baltistan.

== Political career ==
Mehdi was elected to the Gilgit-Baltistan Assembly from GBA-7 Skardu-I as a candidate of Pakistan People's Party (PPP) in the 2026 Gilgit Baltistan Assembly election. He received 4,622 votes and defeated Raja Jalal Hussain Maqpoon, a candidate of Istehkam-e-Pakistan Party (IPP). The Election Commission subsequently notified Mehdi as the elected member for the constituency.

== Cabinet ==
On 22 July 2026, Chief Minister Amjad Hussain named Mehdi as one of eight Pakistan People's Party members appointed to a 12-member provincial cabinet, alongside four members of the Istehkam-e-Pakistan Party. Mehdi was unable to attend the oath-taking ceremony at the Governor's House in Gilgit after a road was blocked, preventing him from travelling from Skardu; his father, Governor Syed Mehdi Shah, administered the oath to the other seven PPP cabinet members in his absence.
