= Akhtar Abbas =

Pakistani politician from Gilgit-Baltistan

- اختر عباس

Member of the Gilgit-Baltistan Assembly
- Incumbent
- Assumed office 8 September 2026
- Preceded by: Wazir Muhammad Saleem (Note: Fida Muhammad Nashad was the winner of the 2026 general elections from GBA-9 Skardu-III, but he was disqualified before he could be sworn in.)
- Constituency: GBA-9 Skardu-III

Personal details
- Party: Pakistan People's Party
- Parent: Fida Muhammad Nashad (father)

Akhtar Abbas is a Pakistani politician who has been a member of the Gilgit-Baltistan Assembly since September 2026.

== Political career ==
Abbas was elected to the Gilgit-Baltistan Assembly in a September 2026 by-election from GBA-9 Skardu-III as a candidate of Pakistan People's Party (PPP). He received 8,399 votes and defeated Wazir Muhammad Saleem, an independent candidate. The by-election was called due to the disqualification of Fida Muhammad Nashad, Abbas's father, for concealing his assets. Nashad won the general elections from GBA-9 Skardu-III, but he was disqualified before he could be sworn in.
