= Lasbela (Karachi) =

Neighborhood in Karachi

Coordinates: 24°53′N 67°02′E

Lasbela (Urdu: لسبيلہ) neighborhood is located in Jamsheed Town, Karachi in Pakistan. The Lasbela bridge is over Lyari River and one of the most important bridges in Karachi. This is the only bridge in Karachi to which the 2nd entrance of the mosque is connected and the name of this mosque is Jamia Masjid Quba and also the Green Line buses runs on it in a separate lane. sabri Hotel, Chishti Bakery, Aone Cloth House, Naseem Cloth Market

Jam of Lasbela from Lasbela State, had his official residence or consulate near the Lyari River before independence of Pakistan. The area got associated with Nawab of Lasbela and was known as Lasbela. The newly built bridge in the area over the Lyari River came to be known as Lasbela bridge.

There are several ethnic groups in Lasbela including Muhajirs, Sindhis, Punjabis, Kashmiris, Saraikis, Pakhtuns, Balochis, Memons, Bohras, Ismailis, etc. Over 99% of the population is Muslim.

== See also ==
- Lasbela bridge
- Liaquatabad Town
- Lasbela District
