= Fida Muhammad Nashad =

Politician in Pakistan

- فدا محمد ناشاد

2nd Speaker of the Gilgit Baltistan Legislative Assembly
- In office 25 June 2015 – 24 November 2020
- Deputy: Jafarullah Khan
- Preceded by: Wazir Baig
- Succeeded by: Syed Amjad Zaidi

Deputy Chief Executive of the Northern Areas Legislative Council
- In office 1999–2004
- Preceded by: Karam Ali Shah
- Succeeded by: Mir Ghazanfar Ali Khan

Member of the Gilgit Baltistan Legislative Assembly
- In office 24 June 2015 – 23 June 2020
- Preceded by: Himself
- Succeeded by: Wazir Muhammad Saleem
- Constituency: GBA-9 Skardu-III
- Majority: 471
- In office 22 October 2013 – 9 December 2014
- Preceded by: Wazir Shakeel Ahmed
- Succeeded by: Himself
- Constituency: GBA-9 Skardu-III
- Majority: 5,863

Member of the Northern Areas Legislative Council
- In office 2004–2009
- In office 1999–2004

Personal details
- Born: Skardu, Pakistan
- Party: Pakistan People's Party (2025-present)
- Other political affiliations: Pakistan Tehreek-e-Insaf (2020-2025); Pakistan Muslim League (N) (2009-2020); Pakistan Muslim League (Q) (2002-2009); Tehreek-e-Jafaria Pakistan (1999-2002); Independent (1999)
- Children: Akhtar Abbas (son)
- Education: University of Punjab

Fida Muhammad Nashad is a Pakistani politician from Gilgit-Baltistan who served as the 2nd Speaker of the Gilgit-Baltistan Assembly from June 2015 to November 2020. He also served a member of the Assembly from October 2013 to December 2014 and from June 2015 to June 2020. He was elected to the 4th Gilgit-Baltistan Assembly, but was disqualified before he could be sworn in.

He also served as a member of the Northern Areas Legislative Council from 1999 to 2004, and from 2004 to 2009. He also served as the Deputy Chief Executive of the Council from 1999 to 2004.

== Political career ==
He was elected to the Northern Areas Legislative Council as an independent candidate in the November 1999 elections. He later joined Tehreek-e-Jafaria Pakistan (TJP).

After the 1999 elections, he was elected as the Deputy Chief Executive of the NALC.

He was re-elected to the NALC from as a candidate of Pakistan Muslim League (Q) (PML(Q)) in the October 2004 elections.

On 6 October 2009, he joined Pakistan Muslim League (N) (PML(N)).

He contested the 2009 Gilgit-Baltistan Assembly election from GBA-9 Skardu-III as a candidate of PML(N), but was unsuccessful. He received 3,883 votes and was defeated by Wazir Shakeel Ahmed, a candidate of Pakistan People's Party (PPP).

He was elected to the Gilgit-Baltistan Assembly from GBA-9 Skardu-III as a candidate of PML(N) in a by-election held on 6 October 2013. He received 8,391 votes and defeated Abbas Mosavi, a candidate of All Pakistan Muslim League (APML). On 22 October 2013 he was sworn in as a member of the Assembly.

He was re-elected to the Gilgit-Baltistan Assembly from GBA-9 Skardu-III as a candidate of PML(N) in the 2015 Gilgit-Baltistan Assembly election. He received 6,201 votes and defeated Wazir Muhammad Saleem, a candidate of Majlis Wahdat-e-Muslimeen (MWM).

On 25 June 2015, he was elected unopposed as the Speaker of the Gilgit-Baltistan Assembly.

In 2020, prior to the 2020 elections, he joined Pakistan Tehreek-e-Insaf (PTI).

He contested the 2020 Gilgit-Baltistan Assembly election from GBA-9 Skardu-III as a candidate of PTI, but was unsuccessful. He received 5,236 votes and was defeated by Wazir Muhammad Saleem, an independent candidate.

On 23 January 2025, he met Bilawal Bhutto Zardari in Islamabad and announced his intention to join PPP.

He was re-elected to the Gilgit-Baltistan Assembly from GBA-9 Skardu-III as a candidate of PPP in the 2026 Gilgit Baltistan Assembly election. He received 6,578 votes and defeated Wazir Muhammad Saleem, an independent candidate. Prior to the election, the returning officer of the constituency rejected his candidacy for concealing his assets. Nashad challenged this decision in an election tribunal, but his challenge was rejected. He then challenged the decision in the Gilgit-Baltistan Chief Court (GBCC), which allowed him to contest the election. After the election, Zakir Hussain, another independent candidate who was defeated by Nashad, challenged his eligibility to become a member of the Assembly in the Supreme Appellate Court Gilgit-Balitstan (SACGB). On 9 July 2026, the SACGB set aside the GBCC's decision, and resultingly disqualified Nashad for concealing his assets. As a result, although being elected to the 4th Assembly of Gilgit-Baltistan, he did not take oath as a member. The resulting by-election was won by Akhtar Abbas, his son.

== Book ==
Fida Muhammad Nashad made a book Slachen which he presented to Pakistan's former president Mamnoon Hussain. He has four books, namely siachen a collection of articles on siachen glaciar, one travelogue book to Iran and Iraq and a poetry book.
