= Sajid Hussain Turi =

Pakistani politician

- ساجدحسین طوری

Member of the National Assembly of Pakistan
- In office 13 August 2018 – 10 August 2023
- Constituency: NA-46 (Tribal Area-VII)
- In office 17 March 2008 – 31 May 2018
- Constituency: NA-37 (Kurram Agency)

Personal details
- Born: 12 February 1977 (age 49) Larkana, Sindh, Pakistan
- Party: PPP (2008-present)

Sajid Hussain Turi (Urdu: ساجد حسین طوری; born 12 February 1977) is a Pakistani politician who had been a member of the National Assembly of Pakistan from August 2018 till August 2023. Previously, he was a member of the National Assembly from 2008 to May 2018. who is the current Federal Minister for Overseas Pakistanis and Human resources and development

== Early life ==
He was born on 12 February 1977.

He is the brother of Sajjad Hussain Turi.

== Political career ==
He was elected to the National Assembly of Pakistan as an independent candidate from Constituency NA-37 (Tribal Area-II) in the 2008 Pakistani general election. He received 26,287 votes and defeated an independent candidate Syed Riaz Hussain.

He was re-elected to the National Assembly as an independent candidate Constituency NA-37 (Tribal Area-II) in the 2013 Pakistani general election. He received 29,623 votes and defeated an independent candidate, Sayed Qaisar Hussain.

He was re-elected to the National Assembly as a candidate of Pakistan Peoples Party (PPP) from Constituency NA-46 (Tribal Area-VII) in the 2018 Pakistani general election. He received 21,461 votes and defeated Syed Iqbal Mian, a candidate of Pakistan Tehreek-e-Insaf.
