= Rizvia Society =

Coordinates: 24.8992°N 67.0289°E

Rizvia Society رضويه سوسائٹی
- Neighbourhood
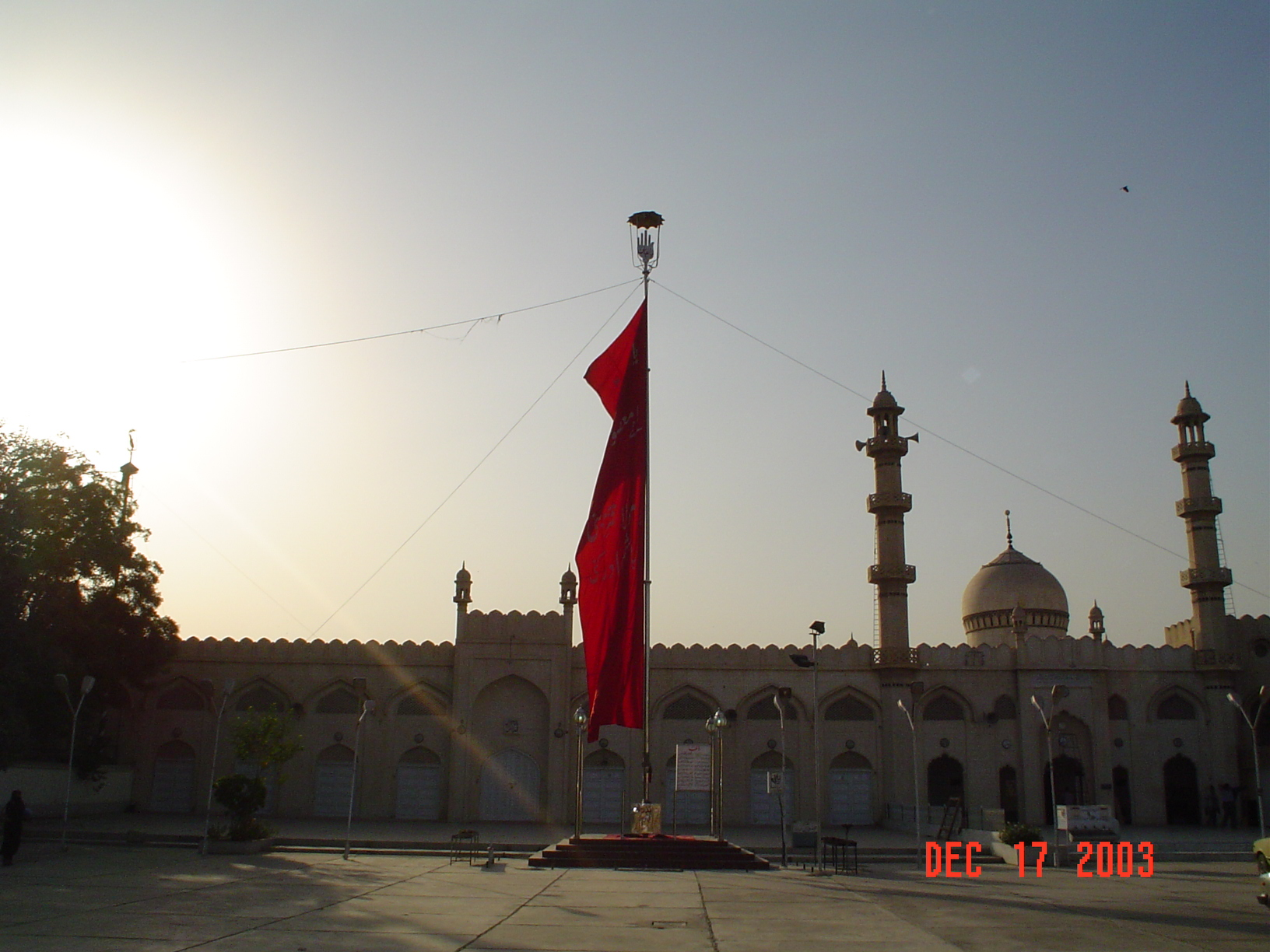
- Imambargah in Rizvia Society
- Interactive map of Rizvia Society رضويه سوسائٹی
- District: Karachi Central
- City: Karachi
- Country: Pakistan
- Time zone: UTC+5 (PST)
- Postal code: 75300

Rizvia Society is a neighborhood in the Karachi Central district of Karachi, Pakistan. It was previously a part of Liaquatabad Town, which was disbanded in 2011. This neighbourhood is predominantly populated by Shia Muslims.

After the independence of Pakistan in 1947, Rizvia Colony was made by a schoolteacher of Sindh Madressah, Maulana Aneesul Hasnain, along with Advocate Mohammad Shabbir Qizilbash and Mohammad Swaleh in 1948. Their concept was to provide plots exclusively to Shia sect Of Islam, and not to people of other sects.

The majority of population migrated after independence from areas of Awadh, especially Lucknow, state in UP.

The postal code for this area is 74600. This co-operative society has its own hospital and a school. The society has a board of trustees which look after the trust matters. This trust has its office in Central Mosque, which is also known as Shah-i-Karbala Mosque.

Three Shopping Centers:

- Rizvia Shopping Center
- Ishrat Arcade
- Bazar e Raza

The population of the region is predominantly Shia, and it is one of the oldest Shia neighbourhoods in Karachi.

== See also ==
- New Rizvia Society
