= Majlis Wahdat-e-Muslimeen =

Pakistani Shia political organization

Majlis Wahdat-e-Muslimeen مجلس وحدتِ مسلمین
- Abbreviation: MWM
- Leader: Raja Nasir Abbas Jafri
- Secretary-General: Iqrar Hussain
- Vice chairman: Muhammad Kazim
- Secretary Information: Zaheer Abbas Naqvi
- Leader in National Assembly of Pakistan: Hameed Hussain
- Leader in Senate of Pakistan: Raja Nasir Abbas Jafri
- Leader in Provincial Assembly of the Punjab: Asad Abbas
- Founder: Raja Nasir Abbas Jafri
- Founded: August 2, 2009; 17 years ago
- Headquarters: Islamabad, Pakistan
- Newspaper: Sada e Wahdat
- Student wing: Wahdat Student Wing
- Youth wing: Wahdat Youth Pakistan
- Women's wing: Wahdat Women Wing
- Trade union: Wahdat Worker's Wing
- Charity wing: Khair ul Amal Foundation
- Lawyers Wing: Wahdat Lawyers Forum
- Ideology: Islamic democracy; Islamic socialism; Islamism; Muslim unity; Shia–Sunni alliance
- Political position: Centre
- Religion: Shia Islam (majority); Sunni Islam (minority)
- National affiliation: TTAP
- Colors: Black, Red and green
- Senate of Pakistan: 1 / 96
- National Assembly of Pakistan: 1 / 336
- Provincial Assembly of Punjab: 1 / 371
- Gilgit-Baltistan Assembly: 1 / 33

Election symbol
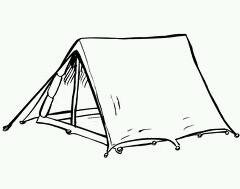
- Tent

Party flag
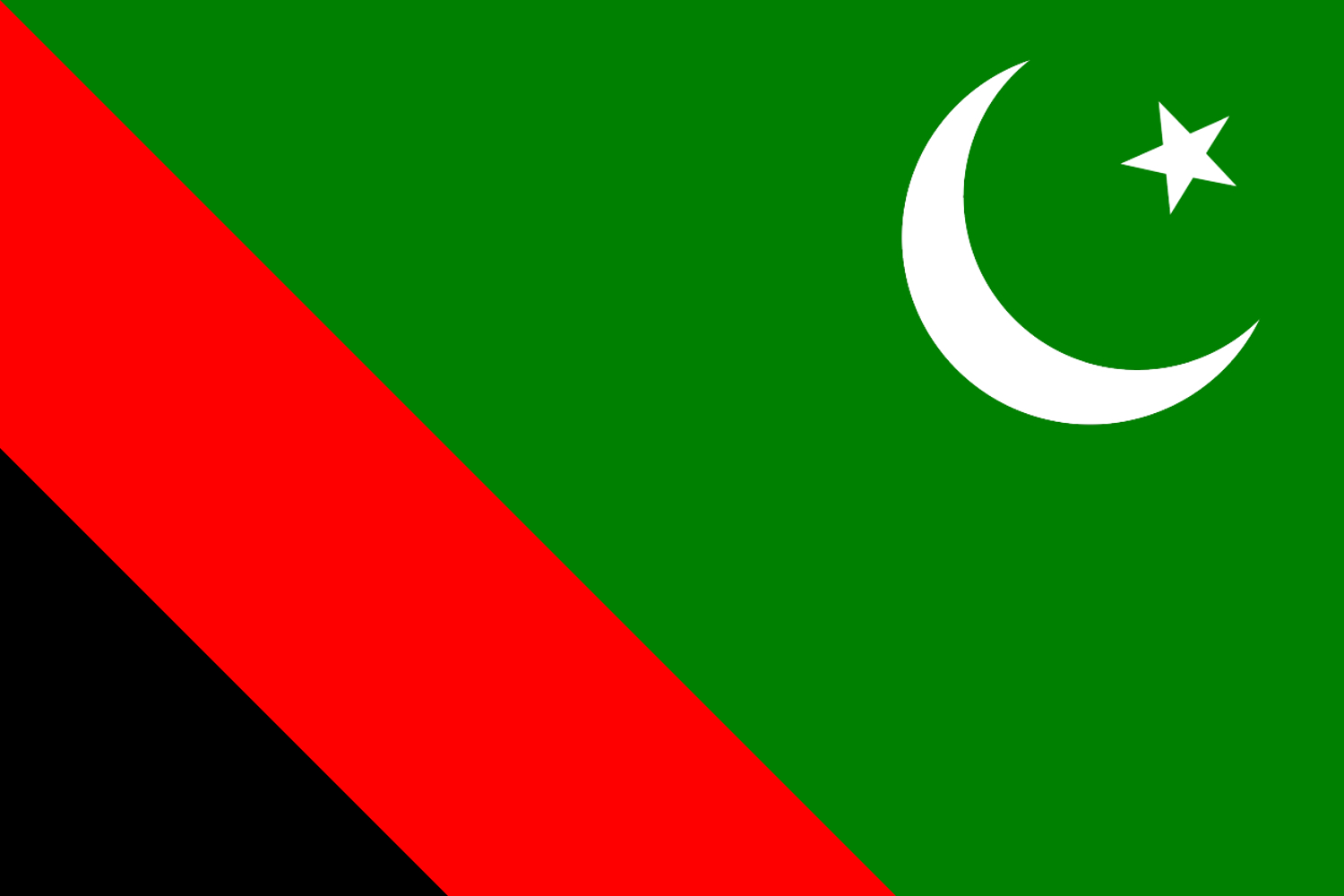

Website
- Official website

Majlis Wahdat-e-Muslimeen (MWM; Urdu: مجلس وحدتِ مسلمین, lit. 'Muslim Unity Assembly') is a Pakistani Shi'a Islamic political organization. Its headquarters are in Islamabad. MWM Pakistan works to establish an Islamic democratic welfare state, particularly emphasising Shi'a-Sunni unity.

== Party profile ==
=== Party objective, agenda and manifesto ===
The Majlis Wahdat-e-Muslimeen is a Shiite Muslim political and religious party of Pakistan whose main objective is to make a practical effort for the revival of Islam and the integrity and stability of Pakistan's nation, Party's main perspective is to speak against the oppression of Pakistan's Shia community, establish goodwill with the Sunni Muslim community, raise political and religious awareness among Muslims and to revive the teachings of the Quran in the society espousing Islamic socialism, MWM agenda envisions a religious Islamic republic that advocates individuals' welfare particularly emphasising Muslim unity through community co-operation, MWM wants to set Pakistan on a course to political stability, social harmony, and economic prosperity for all religious, ethnic and racial communities.

MWM has an agenda to blend traditional social and religious values and cultural and ethnic diversity of Pakistan into common goals and aspirations for a just society based on the Islamic principles and teachings of Mohammad Ali Jinnah, Mohammad Iqbal and Syed Arif Hussain al-Hussaini to fulfill the vision of Islamic democratic regime providing religious awareness, social security, welfare values and the rule of law in the country.

The party manifesto includes a desire to provide credible leadership, to restore Pakistan's political, religious and economic sovereignty, to establish a strong system of accountability and defense to combat corruption and terrorism.

== Foundation ==
Majlis Wahdat-e-Muslimeen was founded by a group of Shiite Muslim clergy and former members of the largest Shiite students' organization Imamia Students Organization on August 2, 2009, in Islamabad, Pakistan.

== Electoral performance ==
In an interview with The Express Tribune, MWM Karachi's political secretary, Syed Asghar Abbas Zaidi, said that the party's aims were to gain seats and to install an Islamic regime. The Election Commission of Pakistan designated the MWM as a political organization in 2013. The election commission allotted Majlis Wahdat-e-Muslimeen the tent as an electoral symbol.

=== 2013 general elections ===
The MWM announced in March 2013 that in the 2013 general elections, it would field more than 50 candidates on provincial seats and 20 on national seats, including 10 provincial slots and 11 national seats from Karachi.

=== 2015 GB elections ===
The MWM participated in the 2015 GB elections and successfully won 2 seats in the Gilgit-Baltistan Assembly.

=== 2020 GB elections ===
For the 2020 GB elections, MWM partnered with Pakistan Tehreek-e-Insaf and won 1 seat in the Gilgit-Baltistan Assembly.

=== 2024 general elections ===
The MWM participated in the 2024 Pakistani general election partnered with PTI and won 1 seat from NA-37 Kurram in National Assembly of Pakistan, The MWM also win 1 seat in Provincial Assembly of the Punjab.

=== 2024 Senate election ===
The Secretary-General Raja Nasir Abbas Jafri during the 2024 Pakistani Senate election elected as a member of Senate unopposed from the Punjab as a MWM candidate.

== Ties and Muslim unity ==
Majlis Wahdat-e-Muslimeen (MWM) supported Pakistan Tehreek-e-Insaf (PTI) in the 2013 Pakistani general elections, 2024 Pakistani general election and its the first religio-political organization which is openly supported by Imran Khan and his party.

Sunni-based Sunni Tehreek (ST), Pakistan Awami Tehreek (PAT), Sunni Ittehad Council (SIC) and Jamiat Ulema-e-Pakistan (JUP) are supporters of Shiite-based MWM to joinly promote unity, peace and has strongly opposed sectarian harmony in Pakistan. All of them are on one platform running against Tehreek-e-Taliban (TTP) a major terrorist group and its sub-groups Sipah-e-Sahaba Pakistan (SSP) and Lashkar-e-Jhangvi (LeJ), The MWM has been a staunch critic of the Tehreek-e-Taliban Pakistan (TTP), and has strongly opposed 'secret government talks' or peace talks with the TTP.

MWM and SIC held many gatherings across Pakistan to promote unity. Minorities including Christians and Hindus were invited to these gatherings. MWM says that they believe that unity is the only way out of sectarian tensions among the Muslims. The both parties has also openly criticized both the Taliban and the United States military involvement in Pakistan, while also heavily participating in anti-terrorism efforts, the MWM has likewise endorsed rule of law, Pakistani nationalism, non-sectarianism and popular sovereignty also has been a vocal critic of foreign interference in Pakistan's national affairs and opposed Pakistani establishment for allowing foreign actors to impose their will on the Pakistani people.

PAT President Dr Raheeq Abbasi expressed gratitude to the MWM leadership for its support to Tahir-ul-Qadri's revolutionary struggle.

The MWM's most prominent move in Pakistani politics came during the 2022-2023 political unrest when it sided with Imran Khan and his party Pakistan Tehreek-e-Insaf. Since the early 2010s, it has actively protested against corruption and disunity among Pakistanis and Muslims, consistently supporting Imran Khan’s policies against corruption. In the 2024 general election, PTI formed Tehreek Tahafuz Ayin (TTAP) an alliance with MWM and SIC united in a bloc against corruption and rigging in the country.

On 23 February 2025, The MWM delegation led by Allama Raja Nasir Abbas Jafari, along with Sunni scholars participated in the Funeral of Hassan Nasrallah as a special Pakistani representatives in Lebanon to pay condolence with Hezbollah and express support to Axis of Resistance against Israeli atrocities, MWM also held condolence events with various religious political parties in Pakistan across the country under the title "Ana Ali al-Ahd," with live broadcasts of the burial ceremony from Beirut.

== Terrorist attacks on party activist and leaders ==
On 28 April 2013, Hassan Kashmiri, MWM activist and a resident of Rizvia Society was gunned down by unidentified gunmen. Following his funeral, the mourning procession took his body to Wadi-e-Hussain graveyard. According to the Senior Superintendent of the Police, Imran Shoukat, as the procession was passing through the Liaquatabad area, some participants opened fired, killing two people. The MWM condemned the attack and denied that the participants had opened fire. The banned Sipah-e-Sahaba is blamed for the attack.

While police were busy with Kashmiri's case, an attack on a Shiite scholar near Liaquatabad No.10 left him injured and his police bodyguard dead. The Senior Superintendent of the Police, Amir Farooqi said that Syed Baqar Hussain Zaidi was heading towards Rizvia Society when four men on motorcycles opened fire.

On 22 August 2014, Mazhar Haider and his younger brother Irfan Haider sustained bullet wounds. They were rushed to hospital where doctors pronounced Irfan's death and admitted Mazhar with critical wounds. MWM spokesman said Mazhar was the MWM president of central district. It was a targeted attack conducted by Sipah-e-Sahaba.

On 15 February 2017, Allama Syed Tasawar Jawadi and his wife were gun shot at Siringar Highway Muzaffarabad by Sipah-e-Sahaba's terrorists. Allama Tasawar Jawadi was the Shiite scholar and was Secretary General of MWM Azad Kashmir (2009–2021). Allama Syed Tasawar Jawadi was given early treatment at SKBZ/CMH Muzaffarabad then referred to CMH Rwp. After 8 months of treatment, Allama Syed Tasawar Jawadi Allama was discharged from CMH Rwp.

== Other activities ==
=== Hunger strike protests over killing of party workers ===
In 2013, MWM announced a general strike after the killing of several of its workers.

A hunger strike by MWM chief commenced in May 2016, while camped in front of National Press Club Islamabad. It organized protests through banners, placards and demonstration led by religious leaders at almost all big cities of Pakistan on Friday 22 July 2016. MWM staged a sit-in at Numaish Chowrangi, Karachi and on The Mall outside the Punjab Assembly on same day.

=== Palestine Independence Aid Campaign ===
On 23 October 2023, The Majlis Wahdat-e-Muslimeen announced Palestine Independence Aid Campaign. The party installed Palestinian aid camps across Pakistan.

The MWM leader Allama Raja Nasir Abbas had praised the Hamas-led attack on Israel. On the same day MWM organized pro-Palestine rallies across the country. In one rally outside US Consulate Karachi, party workers burned US and Israeli Flags in support of the successful attacks of the Hamas and its allies on Israel and expresses solidarity with Palestinians.

Speaking at the main rally, Majlis-e-Wahdat Muslimeen Pakistan's Central Secretary General Syed Nasir Abbas Shirazi said that:

"The international community, which is criminally silent on Israeli atrocities, is now shocked by the Palestinian resistance. The brave Palestinian people have destroyed Israel's claim of invincibility, the responsibility of the entire situation is on the usurper Israel, whose pride has been crushed by the Mujahideen of the Palestinians".

== See also ==
- List of Islamic political parties
- Shia Ulema Council
- Tehrik-e-Jafaria
- Imamia Students Organization
- Sipah-e-Muhammad Pakistan
