= Usmania Colony =

Usmania Colony or Osmania Colony (Urdu: عثمانیہ کالونی) is a neighbourhood of Liaquatabad Town in Karachi, Sindh, Pakistan.

After the independence of Pakistan in 1947, Usmanai Colony was established by those who migrated from Moradabad. One of the official Hakims of the Government of Pakistan, Hakim Syed Zakir, is credited with conceiving Usmania Colony. Over 90% per cent of the Muslim refugees from Moradabad were provided land and houses in this neighbourhood.

There are several ethnic groups in Usmania Colony including Muhajirs, Punjabis, Sindhis, Kashmiris, Seraikis, Pakhtuns, Balochs, Memons, Bohras, Ismailis, etc. Over 99% of the population is Muslim. The population of Gulberg Town is estimated to be nearly one million.
