= New Rizvia Society =

Coordinates: 24.9507°N 67.1473°E

New Rizvia Society (also called Rizvia Society Phase-II) is a residential colony situated in Karachi near Safoora Goth, KDA Scheme No.33, opposite to Karachi Institute of Radiotherapy and Nuclear Medicine (KIRAN) Sindh, Pakistan. New Rizvia Society exclusively provides residential plots to Shia Muslims.

The society is properly secured by a complete boundary wall around it. Only one gate is open for entry and exit from Kiran Hospital Road, which is secured by highly trained and armed guards. As a nice and clean society, with proper roads, New Rizvia Society has proven to be popular amongst Shia Muslims, who like to live a bit outside the pollution of the inner city. You will find houses in the society ranging from 240 to 1000 square yards.

The society is in relative proximity to Jinnah International Airport, University of Karachi and Malir Cantonment. On one side of the society, after the Safooran Roundabout, you will find University Road, which leads into downtown Karachi 15 km away, while on the other side you will find the Super Highway, which leads to the city of Hyderabad 136 km away. At the head of University Road, you will find some shops and stores and good food places. There is also a Bank Al-Habib and a Soneri Bank Ltd to be found on Kiran Hospital Rd, as well as several other banks on University Road.

Many famous religious scholars like Hassan Zafar, Ali Safdar, Faisal Raza Abidi and others live there. The society also has a large Imam Bargah named Samarah in the middle of the society. In November 2016, an outspoken Pakistani Shia leader, and former member of the Senate of Pakistan, Faisal Raza Abidi, was arrested from his residence in New Rizvia Society, during a large-scale operation. While visiting distressed families of the March 2013 Karachi bombing, the Governor of Sindh suggested that residential arrangements be made in New Rizvia Society, for Abbas Town blast survivors.
