= Liaquatabad Town =

Town within the city of Karachi, Pakistan

Liaquatabad Town لیاقت آباد ٹاؤن
- Constituent Town of Karachi
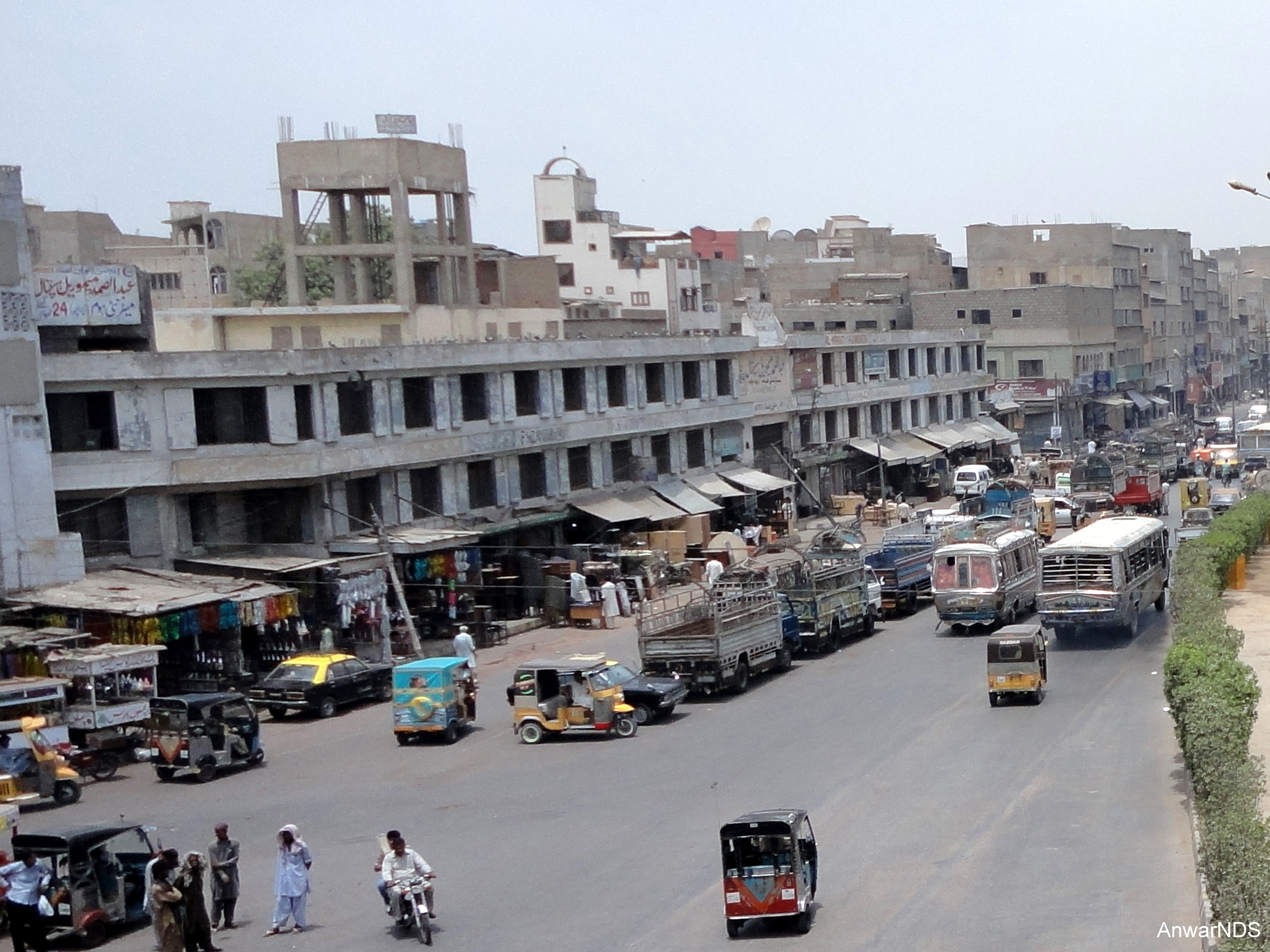
- A view of Liaquatabad, Karachi

- Liaquatabad Town was divided into 07 Union Committees
- Coordinates: 24.9002°N 67.0446°E
- Country: Pakistan
- Province: Sindh
- Nazimabad District: Karachi Division
- Established: 14 August 2001
- Disbanded: 2011
- Union Committees: 07: Moosa Colony Sharifabad Bundhani Colony Ibn-e-Sina Commercial Area Dakhana C-Area

Government
  - Type: Government of Karachi
  - Town Chairman: Faraz Haseeb
  - Constituensy: NA-249 Karachi Central-III
  - National Assembly Member: Ahmed Salim Siddiqui (Muttahida Qaumi Movement - Pakistan)

Area
  - Total: 6 km^{2} (2.3 sq mi)
- Elevation: 25 m (82 ft)
- Highest elevation: 72 m (236 ft)
- Lowest elevation: 9 m (30 ft)

Population (2023 Pakistani census)
  - Total: 547,706
  - Density: 91,284.33/km^{2} (236,425.3/sq mi)
- Time zone: UTC+05:00 (PKT)
  - Summer (DST): DST is not observed
- Postal code: 75900
- Area code: 021
- Office Location: Town Municipal Administration Liaquatabad Town, Shahrah-e-Ibne Sina, Gujar Nala, Nazimabad No.2, Karachi 74600

Liaquatabad Town (Urdu: لیاقت آباد ٹاؤن) lies in the central part of the city of Karachi, in Pakistan. Liaquatabad Town was formed in 2001 under the Local Government Ordinance 2001, and was subdivided into 11 union councils. The town system was disbanded in 2011, but later restored by the government in early 2022. Also Liaquatabad Town was re-organized as part of Karachi Central District in 2015.

== Town Municipal Committee ==
As per the Sindh Local Government Act, 2021, Sindh government replaced the previous seven District Municipal Corporations (DMCs) with 26 towns, each with its own municipal committee. Karachi Central District has five towns.

- New Karachi Town
- North Nazimabad Town
- Gulberg Town
- Liaquatabad Town
- Nazimabad Town

== History ==
The federal government introduced local government reforms in the year 2000, which eliminated the previous "third tier of government" (administrative divisions) and replaced it with the fourth tier (districts). The effect in Karachi was the dissolution of the former Karachi Division in 2001, and the merging of its five districts to form a new Karachi City-District with eighteen autonomous constituent towns including Liaquatabad Town. In 2011, the system was disbanded but remained in place for bureaucratic administration until 2015, when the Karachi Metropolitan Corporation system was reintroduced. In 2015, Liaquatabad Town was re-organized as part of Karachi Central district.

== Demography ==
There are several ethnic groups in Liaquatabad sub-division. The total population of Liaquatabad Sub-Division is 547,706, consisting of 289,338 males and 258,266 females as of the 2023 Pakistani census.

Languages

Languages of Liaquatabad Sub-Division (2023 census)
1. Urdu (89.1%)
2. Punjabi (3.17%)
3. Saraiki (1.72%)
4. Balochi (1.37%)
5. Sindhi (1.02%)
6. Pashto (0.43%)
7. others (3.15%)

Language	Rank	2023 census	Speakers
Urdu	1	89.10%	488,031
Punjabi	2	3.17%	17,412
Saraiki	3	1.72%	9,447
Balochi	4	1.37%	7,542
Sindhi	5	1.02%	5,599
Pashto	6	0.43%	2,409
Others	7	3.15%	17,266
All	8	100%	547,706

Religions

There are 539,707 Muslims, 6,164 Christians, 1,617 Hindus, 129 Ahmadiyya, 15 scheduled castes, 25 Sikhs, zero Parsis and 49 others of total population 547,706 of Liaquatabad sub-division.

Religions in Liaquatabad sub-division (2023)
Religion	Percent
Islam	98.53%
Christianity	1.12%
Hinduism	0.29%
Other	0.03%

== Union Committees ==
07 Union Committees of Liaquatabad in Town Municipal Corporation

Sub Sr Number	Councils Falling in District (Nazimabad)	Number of Union Committee	Name of UC in Town Municipal Corporation
1	TMC Liaquatabad	UC#01	Moosa Colony
2		UC#02	Sharifabad
3		UC#03	Bundhani Colony
4		UC#04	Ibn-e-Sina
5		UC#05	Commercial Area
6		UC#06	Dak khana
7		UC#07	C-Area

== Neighbourhoods ==
- Abbasi Shaheed
- Bandhani Colony
- Commercial Area
- Dak Khana
- Firdous Colony
- Mujahid Colony
- Tughlaqabad
- Liaquatabad
- Nazimabad
- Qasimabad
- Rizvia Society (R.C.H.S.) (Rizvia Co-operative Housing Society)
- Sharifabad
- Gharibabad
- Super Market
- Khamosh Colony
- Gulbahar
- Teen Hatti
- Usmania Colony

== Constituency ==
NA-249 Karachi Central-III

== See also ==
- Karachi Local Government
- Karachi
