= Super Market (Karachi) =

Neighbourhood in Karachi

Super Market سپر مارکیٹ
- Neighbourhood
- Country: Pakistan
- City: Karachi
- District: Karachi Central
- Time zone: UTC+5 (PST)
- Postal code: 75300

Super Market (Urdu: سپر مارکیٹ) is a neighborhood in the Karachi Central district of Karachi, Pakistan. It was previously a part of Liaquatabad Town, which was disbanded in 2011. This area is named after Supermarket in the area.

There are several ethnic groups in Super Market including Muhajirs, Sindhis, Hazarewal, Kashmiris, Seraikis, Pakhtuns, Balochis, Memons, Bohras, Ismailis, etc. Over 99% of the population is Muslim. The population of Liaquatabad Town is estimated to be nearly one million.
