= Raja Zakaria Khan Maqpoon =

Pakistani politician from Gilgit-Baltistan

- راجا زکریا خان مقپون

Member of the Gilgit Baltistan Assembly
- In office 25 November 2020 – 24 November 2025
- Succeeded by: Syed Tauqeer Mehdi
- Constituency: GBA-7 (Skardu-I)

Personal details
- Born: Maqpoon Royal Palace Skardu
- Party: PTI (2015_present)

Raja Muhammad Zakaria Khan Maqpoon is a Pakistani politician who has been a member of the Gilgit Baltistan Assembly from November 2020 to November 2025.

== Political career ==
Maqpoon contested the 2009 Gilgit-Baltistan Assembly election from GBA-7 Skardu-I as a candidate of Muttahida Qaumi Movement (MQM), but was unsuccessful. He received 1,190 votes, placing third, and was defeated by Syed Mehdi Shah, a candidate of Pakistan People's Party (PPP).

He contested the 2020 Gilgit-Baltistan Assembly election on 15 November 2020 from GBA-7 Skardu-I on the ticket of Pakistan Tehreek-e-Insaf (PTI). He won the election by the margin of 1,176 votes over the runner up, Syed Mehdi Shah of PPP, the former Chief Minister of Gilgit-Baltistan. He garnered 5,290 votes while Shah received 4,114 votes.

He contested the 2026 Gilgit-Baltistan Assembly election from GBA-7 Skardu-I as a PTI-supported independent, but was unsuccessful. He received 379 votes, placing sixth, and was defeated by Syed Touqeer Mehdi, a candidate of PPP.
