= Liaquatabad =

Coordinates: 24.9002°N 67.0446°E

- Suburb
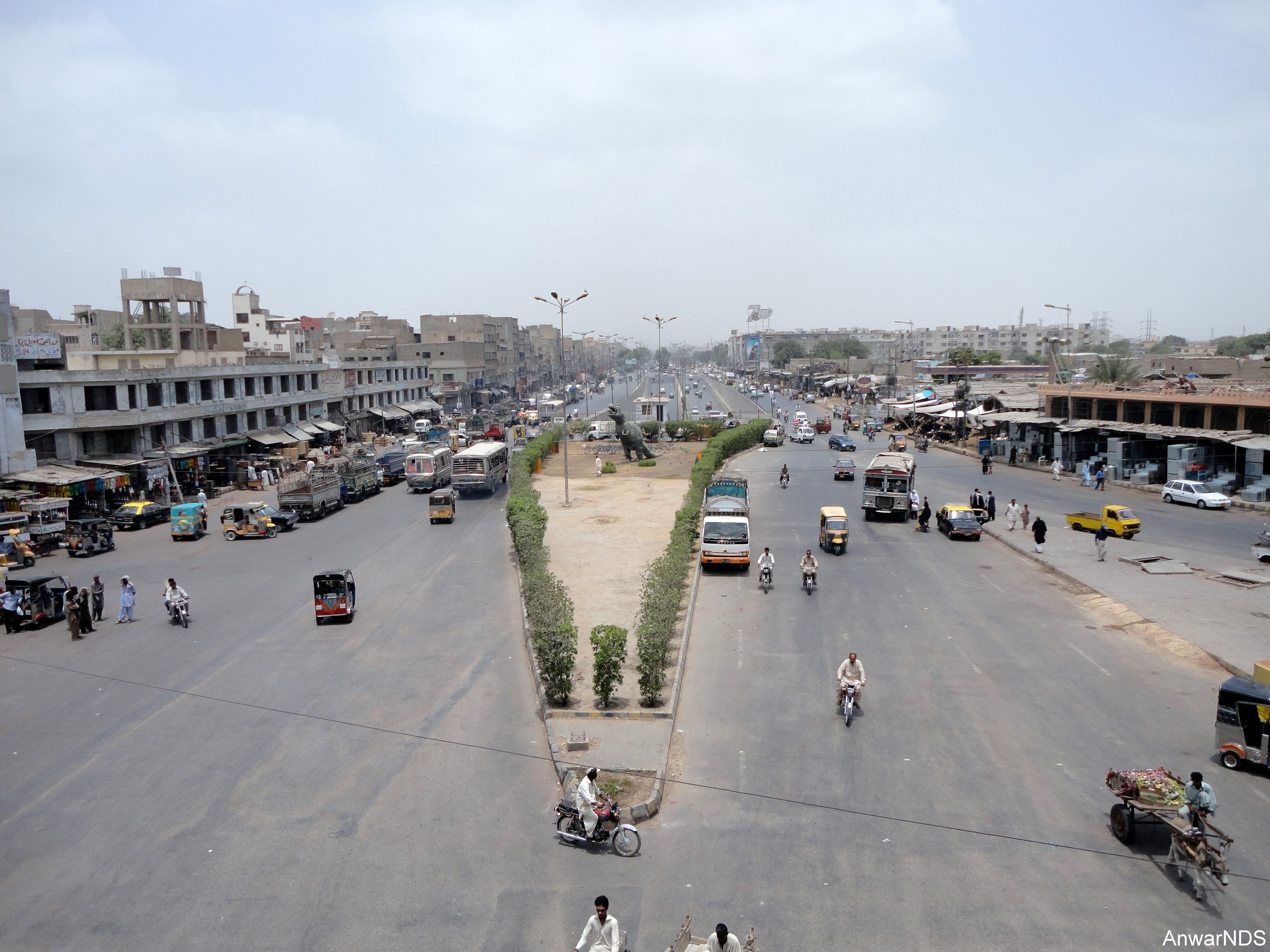
- A view of Liaquatabad, Karachi
- Interactive map of Liaquatabad
- Country: Pakistan
- Province: Sindh
- Established: 1947
- Named for: Liaquat Ali Khan

Liaquatabad (Urdu: لیاقت آباد), also known as Laloo Khait or Lalukhet , is a neighborhood in Liaquatabad Town, within Karachi, Sindh, Pakistan. Liaquatabad was named after Nawabzada Liaquat Ali Khan, the first Prime Minister of Pakistan.

Liaquatabad is a densely populated area surrounded by several commercial zones. Its markets are known for a range of products including furniture, clothing, shoes and jewellery.

== History ==
Liaquatabad, formerly known as Lalukhet because it was once the agricultural land along the Lyari River belonging to a man named Lalu. The land was purchased by Pakistan Public Works Department from Lalu to settle the Urdu speaking Muslim from India at the time of partition.

== Demographics ==
There are several ethnic groups in Liaquatabad including Muhajirs, Sindhis, Punjabis, Pakhtuns, Baloch, Memons, Bohras and Ismailis. The population of Liaquatabad Town is estimated to be nearly half a million people according to the 1998 census. Muhajirs constitute the overwhelming majority of the population of Liaquatabad. Liaquatabad is located in the centre of Karachi.
