= Teen Hatti Bridge =

Bridge in Karachi, Pakistan

Coordinates: 24°53′31″N 67°02′37″E

Teen Hatti is a bridge over the Lyari River in Karachi, Pakistan.

The origin of its name is uncertain, but the prevalent opinion is that long ago there were three roadside houses (in Goan "Hatti" means house) at or near the current bridge, hence the name "teen" (meaning "three" in Urdu) and "hatti" (meaning roadside houses in Urdu). According to another version, "Hatti" is a Punjabi word meaning "shop", not "house". Long ago old people said there were three shops. So this stop was named "teen hatti"
