= Funeral of Hassan Nasrallah =

2025 funeral in Beirut, Lebanon

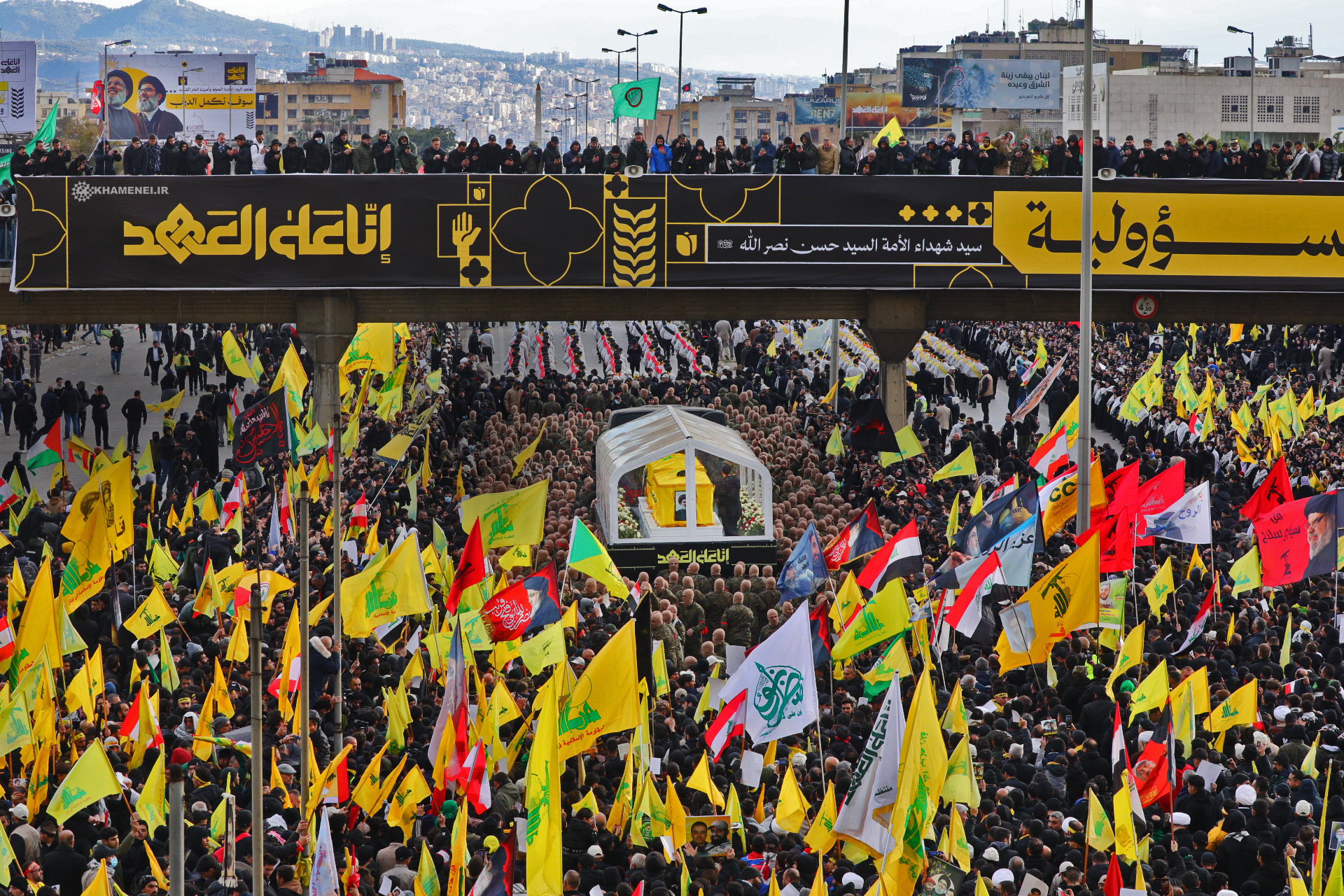
- Date: 23 February 2025
- Location: Camille Chamoun Sports City Stadium, Beirut, Lebanon
- Participants: 450,000–1,400,000 mourners Representatives of 79 countries

The funeral of Hassan Nasrallah, the third Secretary-General of Hezbollah, was held on 23 February 2025 at the Camille Chamoun Sports City Stadium in Beirut, Lebanon. Nasrallah was buried five months after he was assassinated by an Israeli airstrike on his bunker in Haret Hreik on 27 September 2024. The funeral also honoured Hashem Safieddine, who served as the de facto leader of Hezbollah following Nasrallah's death, before he, too, was assassinated by Israel on 3 October 2024. The Associated Press called the funeral the largest in Lebanon in two decades.

== Background ==
During the September 2024 Lebanon strikes, Nasrallah was killed in an Israeli airstrike on the headquarters of Hezbollah in Haret Hreik, Beirut on 27 September 2024. Nasrallah was temporarily buried in a secret location until the funeral, during which he was interred in a designated plot on Beirut's airport road, while Hashem Safieddine was buried in his hometown of Deir Qanoun al-Nahr.

Nasrallah was succeeded by his deputy Naim Qassem.

== Events ==
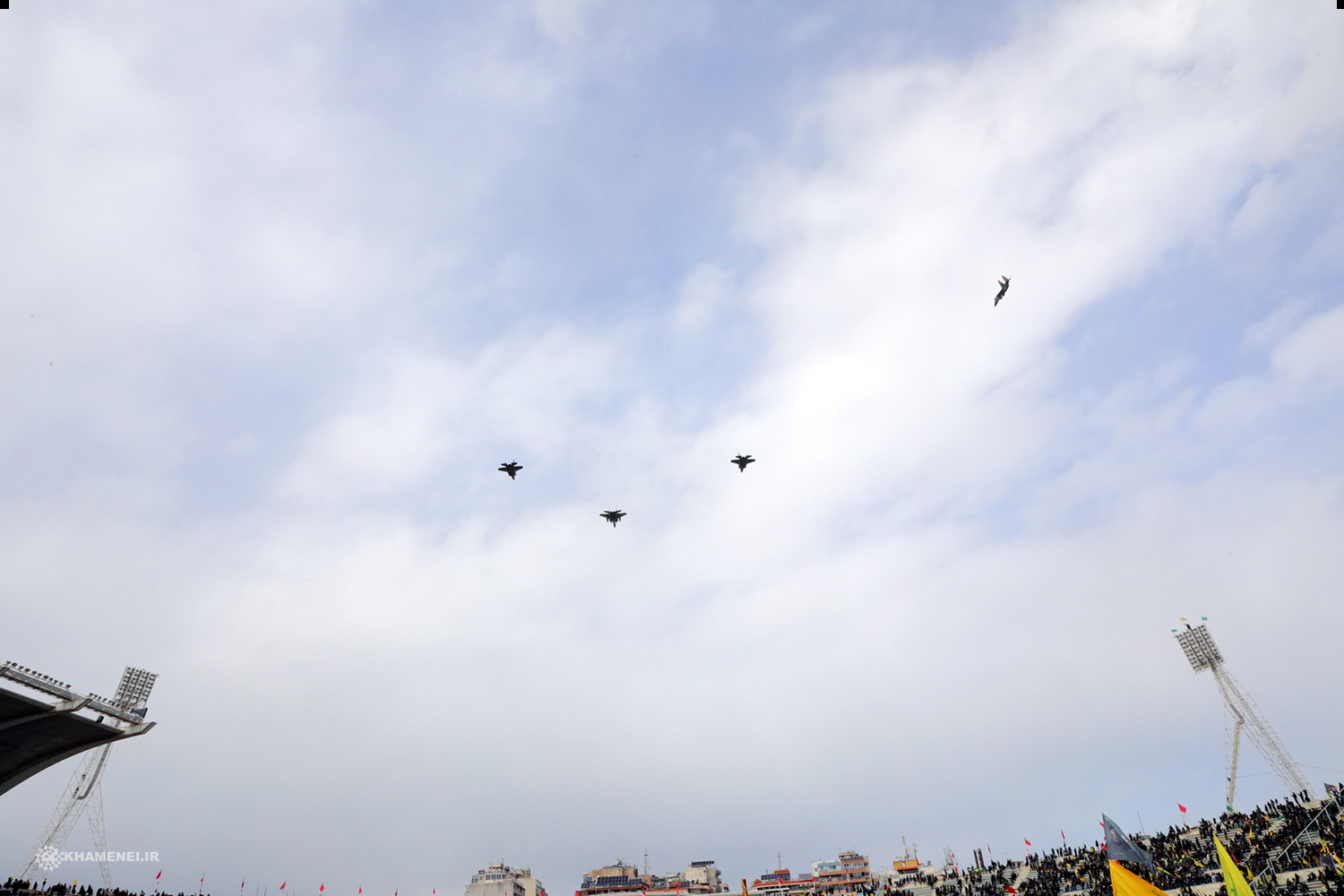
Israeli fighter jets flying low over the funeral.

Preparations for Nasrallah's funeral took several months. Al-Manar reported that a supreme committee, divided into ten sub-committees, was responsible for the ceremony. The abandoned Camille Chamoun Sports City Stadium was chosen to be the place of the event. According to reports, hundreds of thousands of people attended the mass funeral with "pictures of Nasrallah and Hezbollah flags". Representatives from 79 countries participated. The event garnered widespread media coverage, with both local and international news agencies providing extensive reporting. Between 450,000 and 1.4 million mourners attended the funeral.

During the funeral, Israeli F-15 and F-35 jets flew over the stadium.

== Attendees ==
Lebanese Prime Minister Nawaf Salam designated Labor Minister Mohammad Haidar to represent him at the funeral, while parliamentary speaker Nabih Berri represented president Joseph Aoun. Other prominent Lebanese politicians that participated included Marada Movement leader Suleiman Franjieh, former president Emile Lahoud, and head of the Lebanese Democratic Party Talal Arslan.

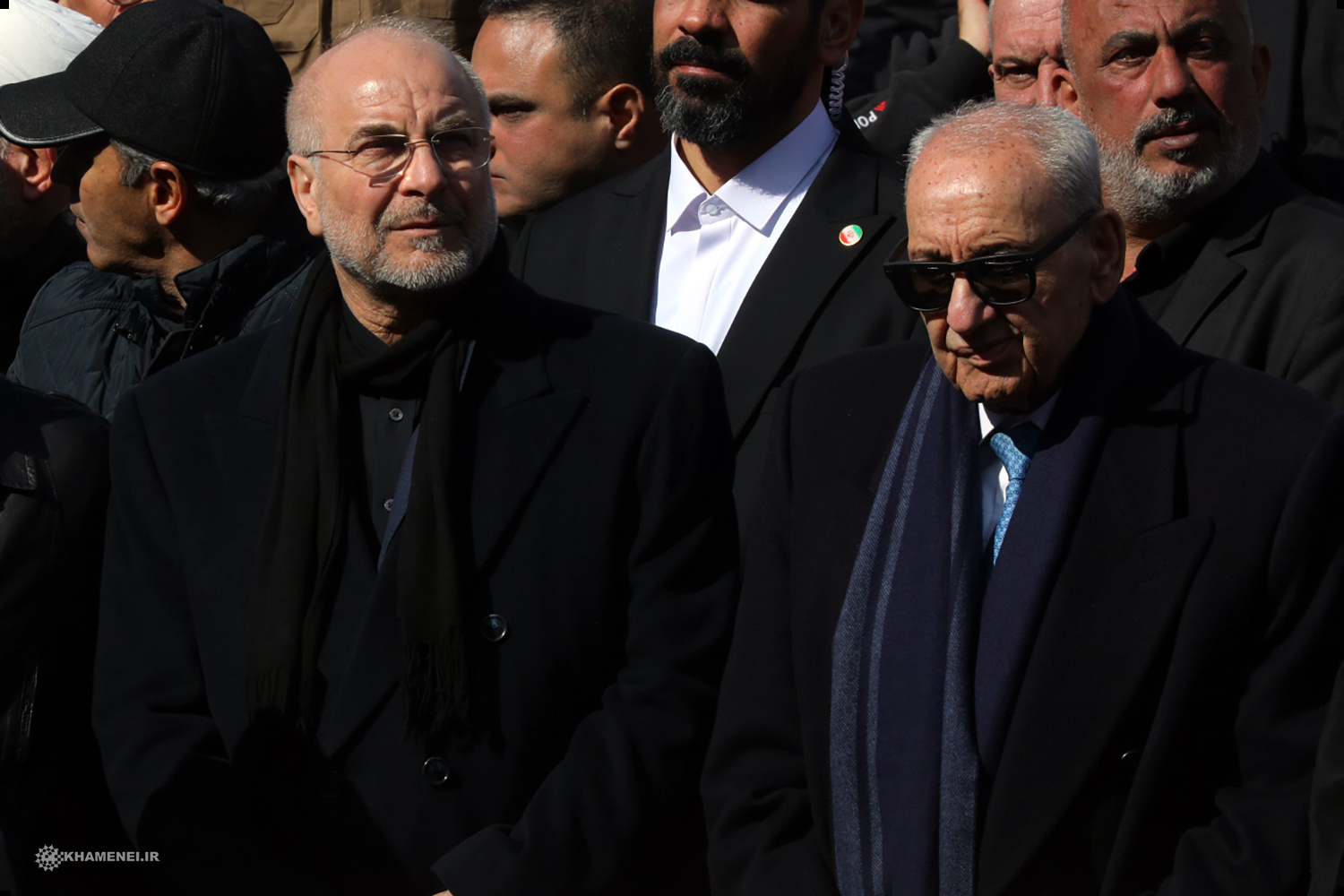
Mohammad Bagher Ghalibaf, Speaker of the Iranian Parliament, and Nabih Berri, Speaker of the Lebanese Parliament in attendance at the funeral of Hassan Nasrallah.

Iranian Foreign Minister Abbas Araqchi was part of a high-ranking Iranian delegation attending the funeral of Hassan Nasrallah. He condemned Israel for deploying its fighter jets at low altitudes over the Lebanese capital, Beirut, describing the action as a "terrorist act". Iranian Shura Council Speaker Mohammad Bagher Qalibaf attended and Foreign Minister Abbas Araqchi, represented the Iranian president.

Large delegations from Axis of Resistance groups such as the Houthis and the Popular Mobilization Forces including its leader Falih al Fayyadh attended the funeral.

Estimates of the number of attendees varied from 1.4 million people (The Lebanese National News Agency) to 450,000 (an anonymous Lebanese official told the Associated Press).

=== Americans ===
Jackson Hinkle and Haz Al-Din of the American Communist Party, an offshoot of the Communist Party USA, attended the funeral.

According to the United States Department of Homeland Security, professor Rasha Alawieh of Brown University traveled to Lebanon to attend the funeral. She was denied re-entry into the US, and despite having a H-1B visa and a court order temporarily blocking her explusion, she was deported as part of Trump-policy activist deportations.

== Logistics, security, and media coverage ==
The funeral took place at Beirut Sports City from 09:00 through 17:30 EET (UTC+2). Events included a funeral procession through Beirut, a memorial service at Hezbollah headquarters, speeches from political and religious figures, and a funeral prayer at a main mosque. The coffins were transported via Beirut's old and new airport roads under heightened security measures, including road closures and increased deployment of Lebanese security forces and Hezbollah personnel.

A higher committee for ceremonies comprises multiple subcommittees organizing security, field logistics, and international relations. Over 20,000 personnel are involved in coordinating the event. The media committee, led by Sheikh Nasser Akhdar, has ensured unprecedented media coverage, including:

- 400 local and international media institutions participating.
- 120 cameras stationed across 25 key locations for live coverage.
- Establishment of a specialized media center in the Ghobeiry Municipality cultural center.
- Live coverage in at least four languages.
- 15 designated locations for media coverage.
- Production of documentary films by over 30 local and international teams.
- A social media campaign under the slogan "We are committed to the covenant."

== Responses ==
The funeral attracted unprecedented media attention, particularly among Hezbollah supporters, who adopted the slogan "We are committed to the covenant." Many expressed the desire for Nasrallah's resting place to become a shrine. Meanwhile, Hezbollah's political opposition in the Lebanese Forces argued that his burial represented a symbolic end for Hezbollah, given the party's recent military and political struggles.

Several dozen American protestors held a funeral for Nasrallah in New York City, and were met with counter-protestors.

Air France and Emirates announced a preliminary cancellation of flights to Lebanon on the day of the funeral due to security concerns and potential disruptions in Beirut.

== Reactions ==
=== Domestic ===
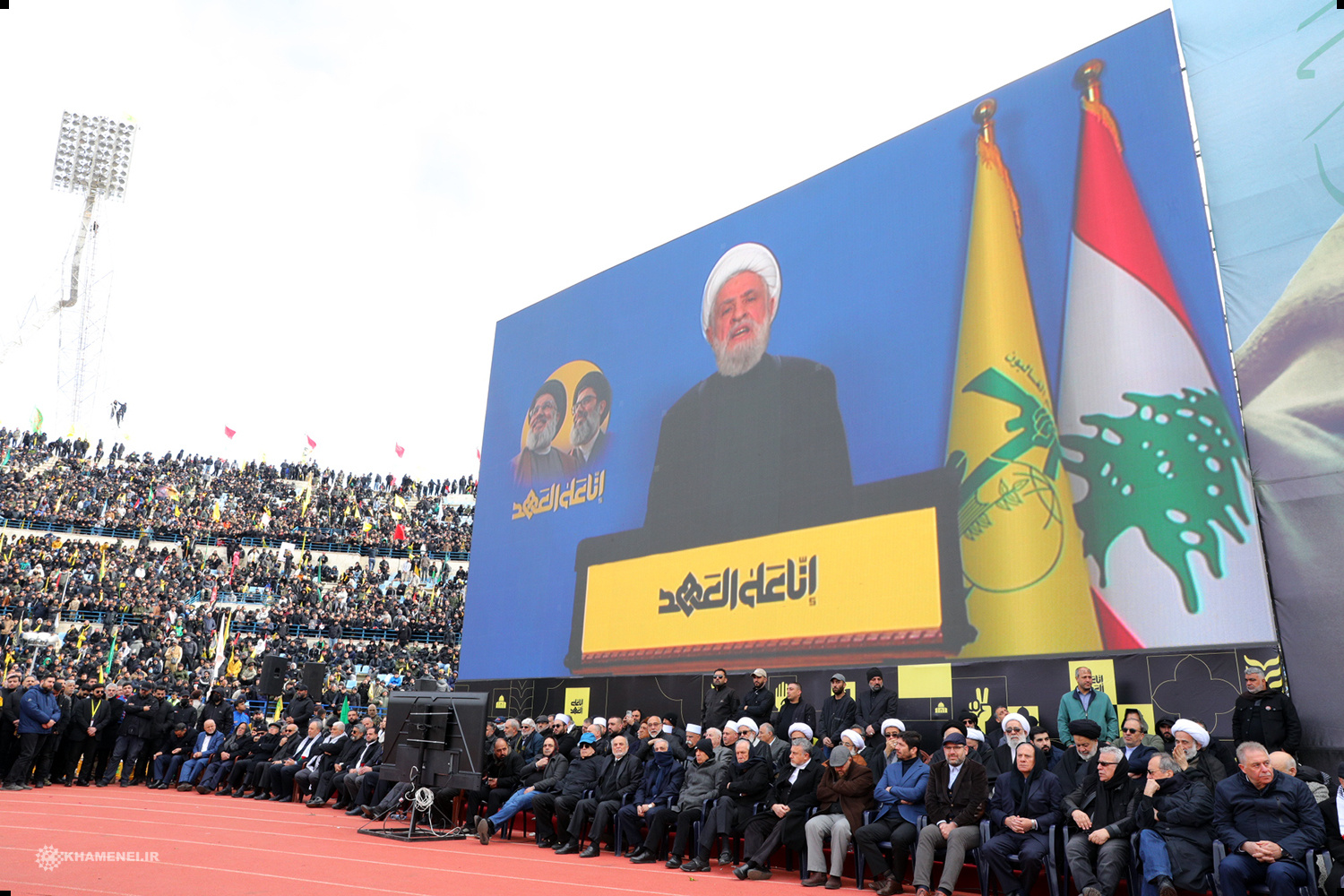
Hezbollah Leader Sheikh Naim Qassem delivers a pre-recorded speech

- Lebanon: Lebanese President Joseph Aoun met with an Iranian delegation led by Shura Council Speaker Mohammad Bagher Ghalibaf at the Presidential Palace, coinciding with the funeral. During the meeting, Aoun emphasized that Lebanon is weary of being drawn into external conflicts and that national unity is the best way to confront challenges and external threats. He also reaffirmed that Lebanon has borne a heavy cost in defending the Palestinian cause and remains committed to supporting a two-state solution. In response, Ghalibaf reiterated Iran's support for any decision made by Lebanon and expressed Tehran's willingness to contribute to the reconstruction efforts following the destruction the country has endured.
- Hezbollah: Secretary–General Naim Qassem spoke to the crowd in the stadium from an undisclosed location and stated that Hezbollah remains "strong".

=== International ===
- Iran: Iran confirmed its participation at the highest levels, with senior Iranian officials attending the funeral. Iranian Foreign Ministry spokesperson Esmail Baqaei stated that Tehran intends to demonstrate strong support for Hezbollah on this occasion.
- Yemen: Yemeni Information Minister Muammar al-Eryani called on the Lebanese government to arrest Houthi leaders who will participate in the funeral, stressing that their movements "are not just participation in the funeral ceremonies," but are part of an attempt to "reorganize the ranks of the Iranian axis" after the strikes it suffered. Al-Eryani explained that these movements are linked to attacks on commercial ships and oil tankers, which pose a threat to regional and international security. He called on Lebanon to take a firm stance and hand over the Houthis to the Yemeni government, stressing the need to prevent them from using Lebanon as a safe haven.
- Israel: The Israeli army spokesman for Arab media, Avichay Adraee, released a video in which he commented on the funeral of Hassan Nasrallah. In the video, he stated: "Today is the funeral of Hassan Nasrallah, and his entourage is in mourning. But let us pause for a moment and ask: What exactly are they mourning? Are they grieving for the man who turned Lebanon into a failed state? The one who sacrificed your future for Iran's interests? The one who destroyed the economy, divided the people, and dragged the country into pointless wars? Since Nasrallah took over Hezbollah's leadership, Lebanon has known nothing but collapse. The country has been taken hostage by the so-called 'Islamic Revolution' project." During the funeral, Israeli F-15 and F-35 jets flew over the stadium.

== Gallery ==
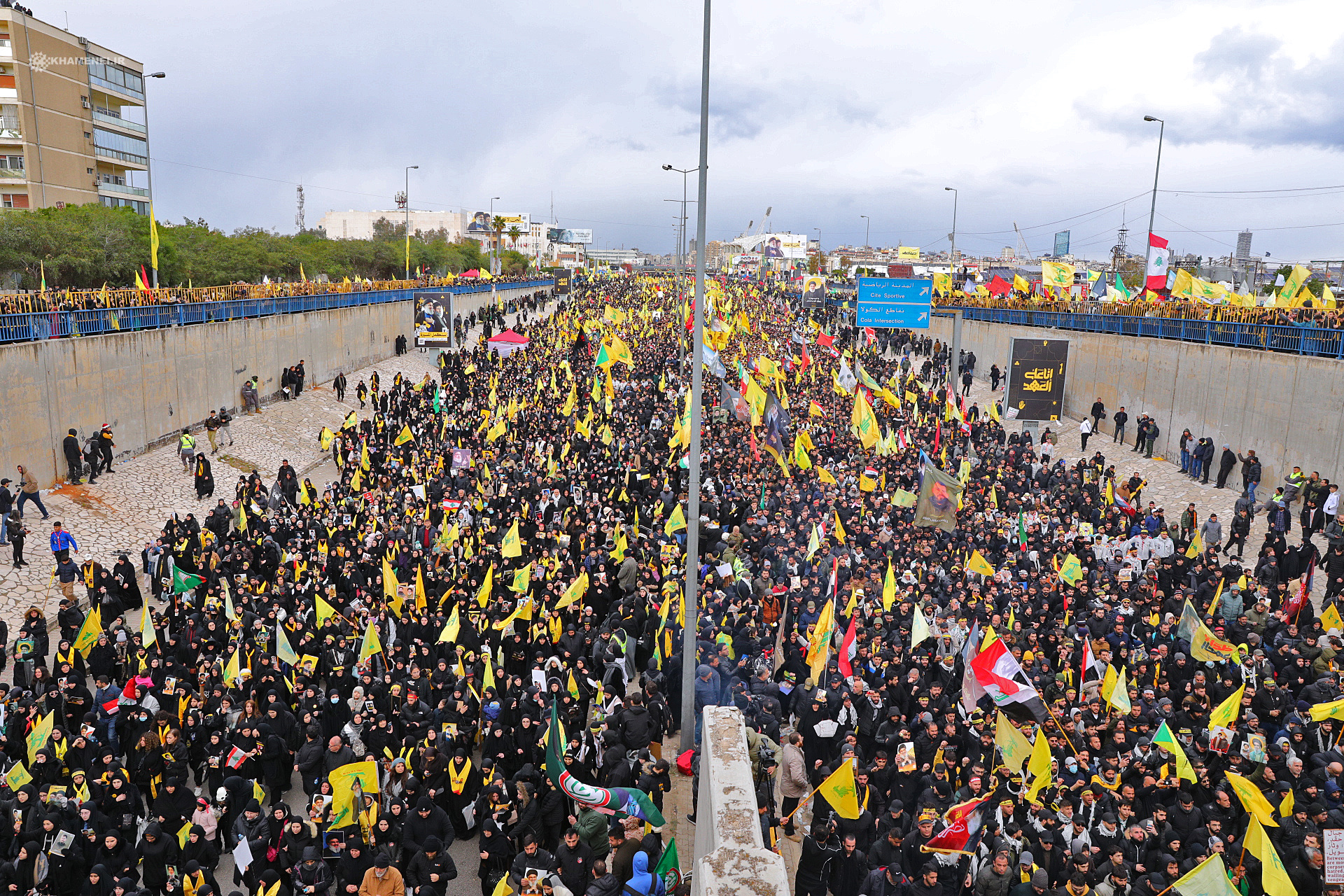
Thousands of people attending the funeral

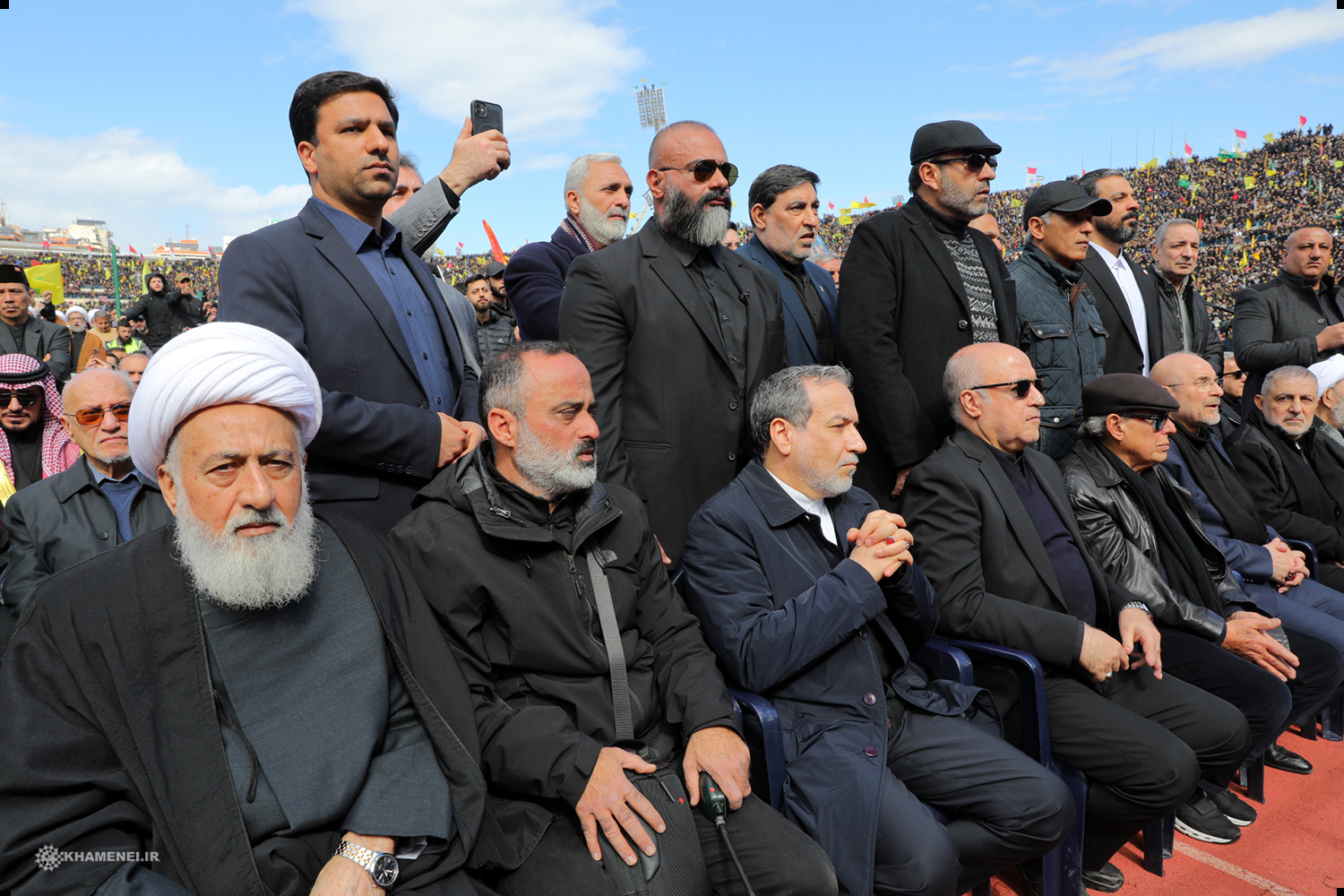
Lebanese and foreign dignitaries in attendance.

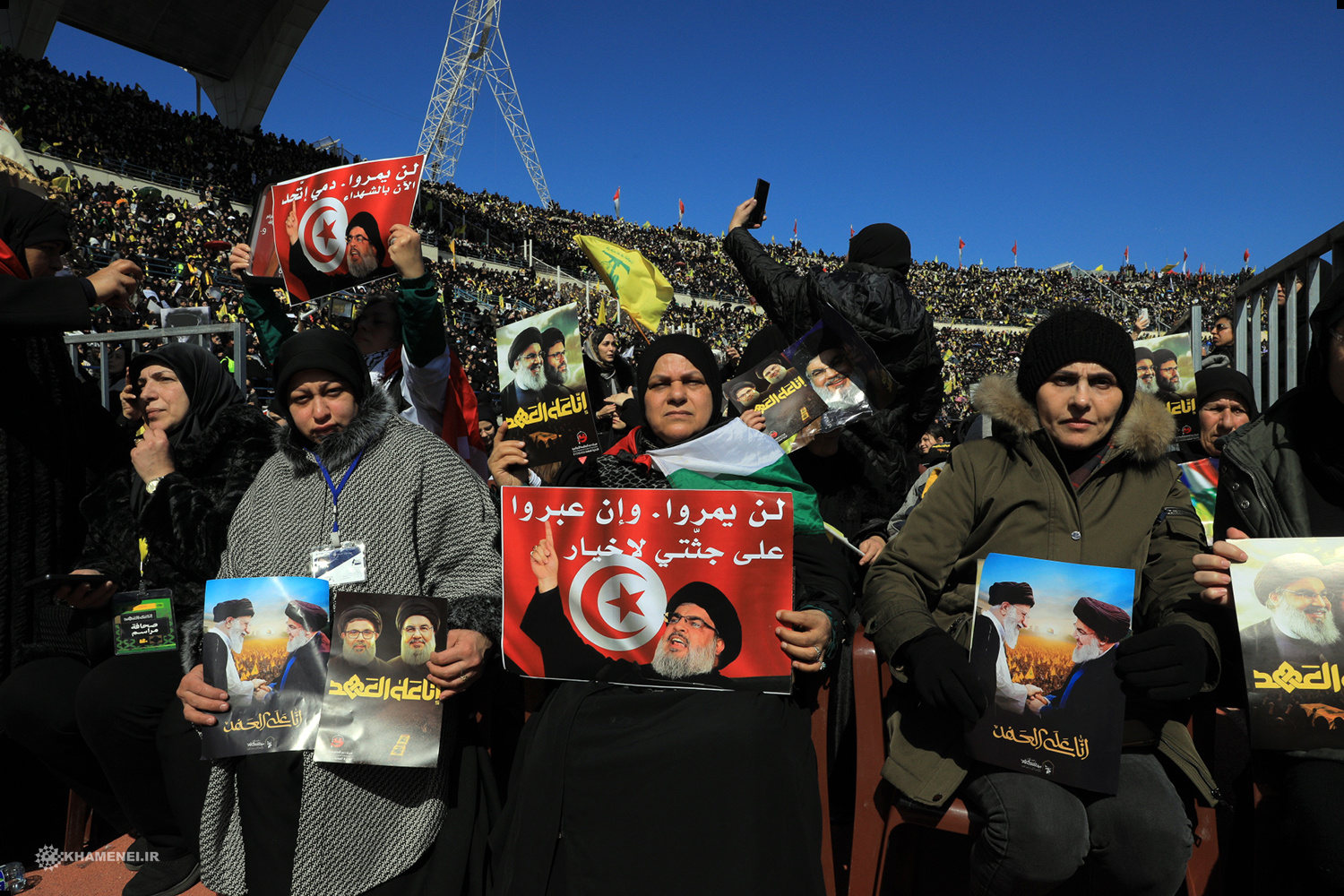
People from other countries

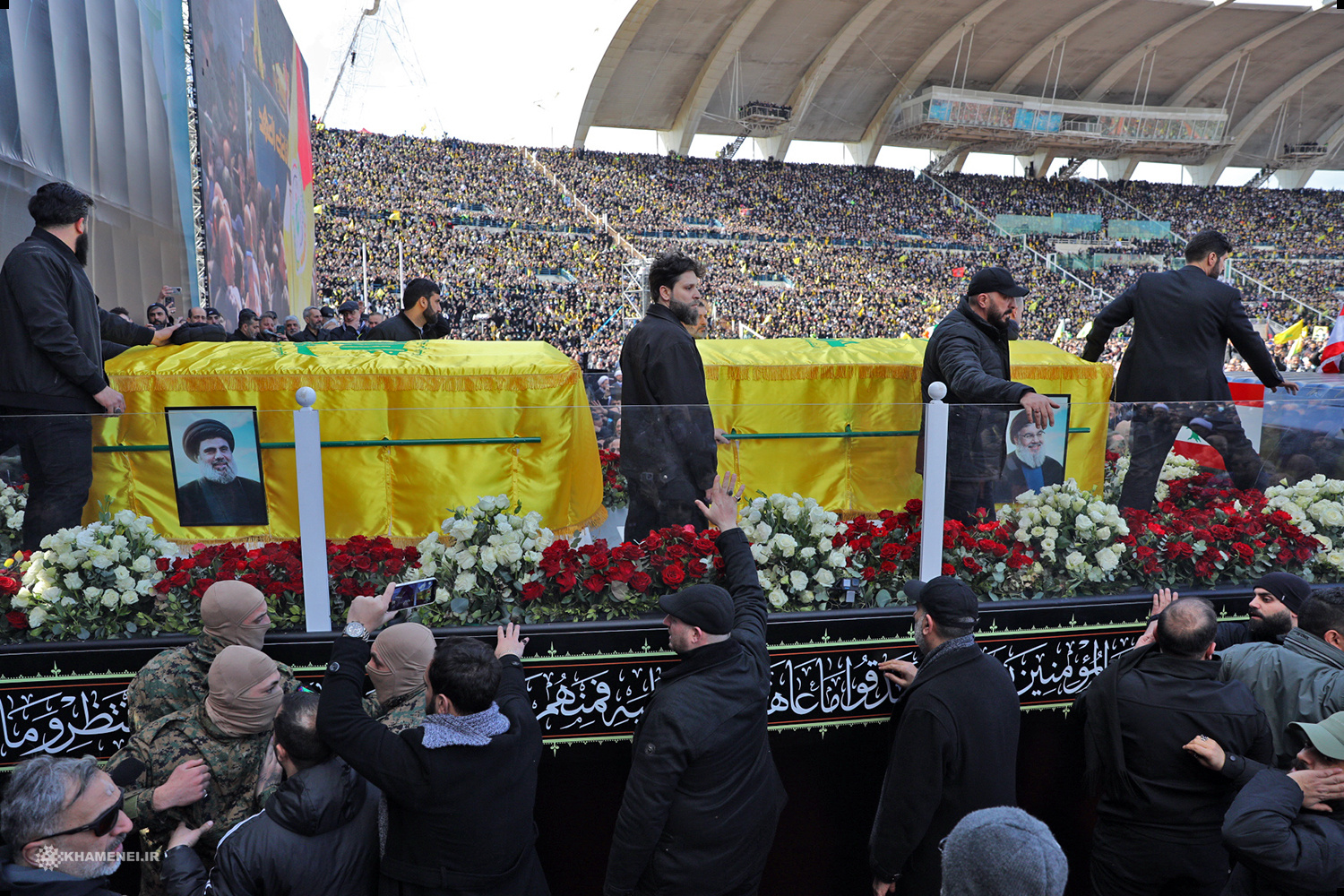
Coffins of Hashem Safieddine (left) and Hassan Nasrallah (right)

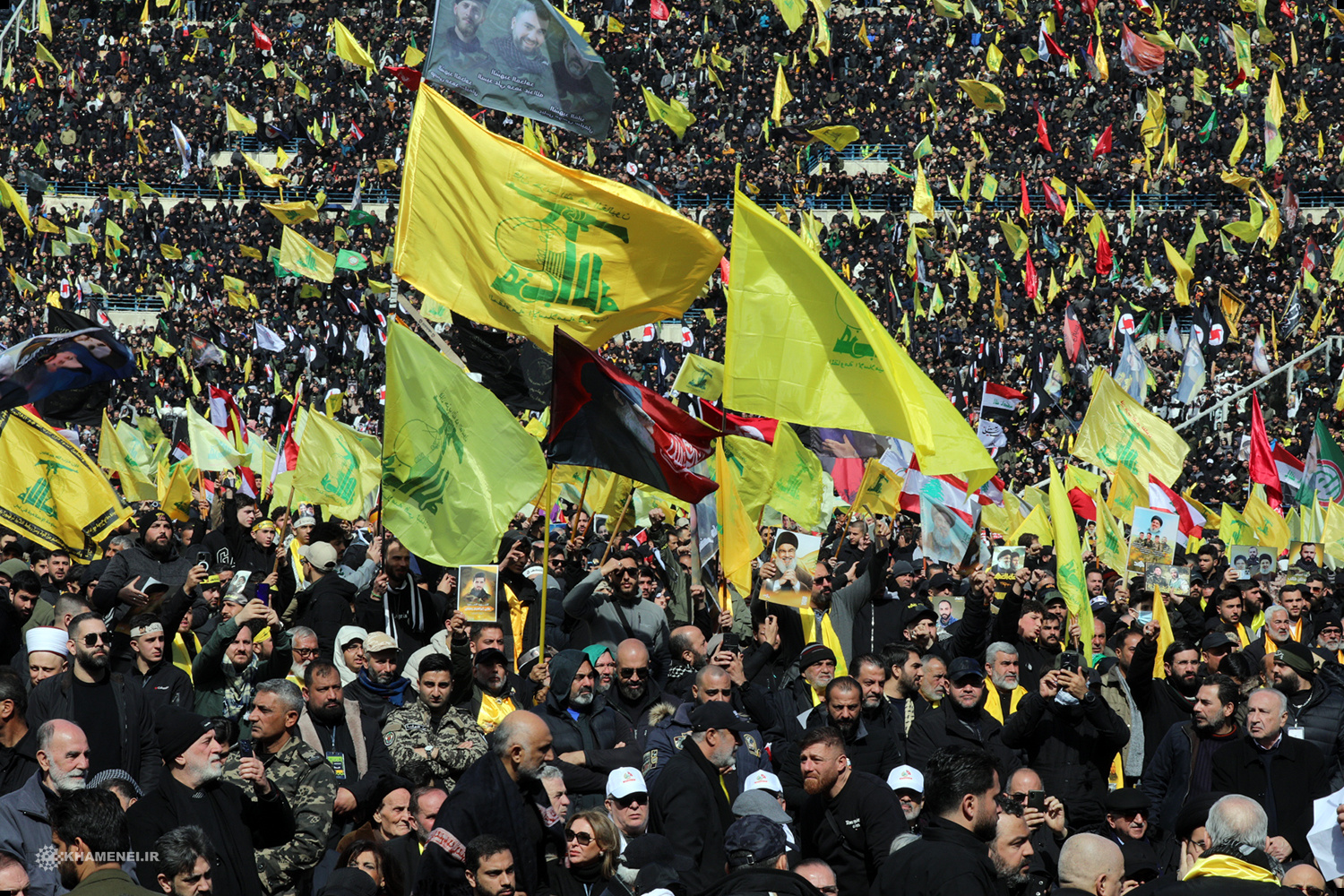
Thousands of people waving Hezbollah flags

== See also ==
- Funeral of Qasem Soleimani
- Death and state funeral of Ruhollah Khomeini
- State funeral of Ali Khamenei
- List of largest funerals
