= Alleged electoral manipulation in Pakistan =

Electoral fraud in Pakistan

Electoral fraud in Pakistan (Urdu: پاکستان میں انتخابی دھاندلی) has history intertwined with military interventions and legal obstacles against political dissenters, impacting the democratic process. Since its inception in 1947, Pakistan experienced alternating phases of democracy and authoritarianism, with the first general elections held only in 1970. The early governance was managed by a Constituent Assembly of Pakistan, tasked with both administrative functions and drafting a constitution.

== 1960 Pakistani referendum ==
On February 14, 1960, Pakistan held a referendum, which was President Muhammad Ayub Khan's first popular vote following the suspension of the parliamentary system in 1958. The lack of enthusiasm regarding the outcome was highlighted by the pre-emptive publication of Ayub Khan's inaugural plans by Dawn, several days before the official vote count was confirmed.

== 1977 Pakistani general election ==
The 1977 elections are widely regarded as rigged. Zulfikar Ali Bhutto, maintaining some aspects of the prior military regime, called for elections for the national and provincial assemblies on 7 and 10 March 1977, respectively. These elections were marred by allegations of manipulation, including the dissolution and replacement of the governments in Balochistan and North-West Frontier Province with PPP-led administrations.

A notable strategy, the Larkana plan, involved setting up a special election cell within the federal ministry to influence election outcomes, collaborating with district administrations for this purpose. This led to accusations of systematic rigging. The opposition, consolidated under the Pakistan National Alliance (PNA), faced obstacles as state resources and intelligence were allegedly used to skew results in favor of Bhutto and the PPP.

Due to these malpractices, several PPP candidates for both the National and Provincial Assemblies were declared winners unopposed. In a notable case, Jan Mohammad Abbasi, Bhutto's challenger in Larkana, was arrested before he could file his nomination, leading to Bhutto's uncontested victory. In the face of growing political unrest, the government's crackdown involved the arrest and detention of opposition candidates. The crisis escalated and it resulted in General Zia-ul-Haq deposing the elected government on 5 July 1977 and imposing martial law.

== 1985 Pakistani general election ==
The 1985 elections, initially slated for 1977, were postponed following Zia-ul-Haq's coup, pledging elections within 90 days. These elections, notably partyless, barred political parties from fielding candidates due to a constitutional amendment.

Observers such as Nusrat Javed have noted the contrast between the nonpartisan nature of the 1985 elections and the specific political obstacles encountered in the 2024 elections. Tahir Mehdi attributed the current trend where independent candidates align with political parties' post-election to the precedents set in 1985, suggesting this practice undermined parliamentary democracy and electoral integrity. Mazhar Abbas argued that the lack of party-based elections amounted to inherent pre-poll rigging, deepening societal divisions along feudal and caste lines.

== 1990 Pakistani general election ==
The manipulation of the 1990 election can be traced back to the pre-1988 electoral landscape, with the formation of the Islami Jamhoori Ittehad (IJI), a coalition of nine parties. This alliance, orchestrated by former ISI Chief Hamid Gul, aimed to counter prime minister Benazir Bhutto's political influence. Despite being rapidly assembled, the IJI failed to secure a victory in the 1988 elections.

By 1990, the IJI had strengthened its position, with its chairman, Ghulam Mustafa Jatoi, serving as the caretaker prime minister of Pakistan for the elections, aiming to influence the outcome.

In 2012, the Supreme Court of Pakistan recognized substantial evidence of rigging in the 1990 elections, implicating Ghulam Ishaq Khan, Mirza Aslam Beg, and Asad Durrani. The court also highlighted the illegal distribution of Rs 140 million from the state treasury to opposition politicians by Younas Habib, aimed at preventing a PPP victory.

The Supreme Court's ruling in the Asghar Khan case was a significant judicial acknowledgment of election rigging. Mazhar Abbas referred to the 1990 elections as "the mother of all rigging." In addition to financial manipulation, there were efforts to tarnish Benazir Bhutto's public image through character assassination and negative propaganda.

== 1997 Pakistani general election ==
In 1997, Nawaz Sharif won the election, securing 137 out of 217 National Assembly of Pakistan seats, while Benazir Bhutto's Pakistan People's Party (PPP) saw its seats dramatically reduce from 89 to 18. The PPP's decline was influenced by factors including the assassination of Benazir's brother Murtaza Bhutto, allegations of corruption against Benazir Bhutto's husband Asif Ali Zardari, and a crackdown on the PPP following the dismissal of Benazir Bhutto's government and subsequent actions against PPP affiliates.

Journalist and historian Nadeem F. Paracha and journalist Tahir Mehdi have highlighted the 1997 elections' controversial aspects. The crackdown on the PPP and the narrative of corruption against Zardari were key factors contributing to Sharif's overwhelming parliamentary majority. International observers from the European Union and the Commonwealth of Nations said the election met basic conditions but would not describe it as 'free and fair'.

== 2002 Pakistani general election ==
In 2002, Pakistan's political dynamics shifted when Pervez Musharraf, holding dual roles as Army Chief and President, conducted elections. The event was notable for the direct involvement of military influence in the electoral process, a contrast to previous instances of behind-the-scenes manipulation.

The elections resulted in a victory for the PML-Q, a party established shortly before the elections, consisting of politicians primarily drawn from traditional political parties such as the PPP and PML-N. To further control the political landscape, the Musharraf-led government introduced the Political Parties Order, 2002, imposing criteria that effectively disqualified the leadership of the PPP and the PML-N from participating in the elections. The administrative machinery, from the police to vote counters, was reportedly aligned with state interests, suggesting widespread rigging.

Journalist Zarrar Khuhro described the elections as heavily manipulated, with disenfranchisement disguised as electoral reform. One controversial reform was the requirement for candidates to hold graduate degrees, a stipulation that excluded many potential candidates due to the educational standards in Pakistan. However, an exception was made for religious scholars, equating madrassah certificates with graduate degrees, thereby favoring the pro-Musharraf alliance called Muttahida Majlis-e-Amal and introducing a bias in candidate eligibility.

== 2002 Pakistani referendum ==
The referendum was seen by many as a sham or fixed. Opposition parties including the PPP and the Pakistan Muslim League referred to Musharraf's decision to hold a referendum as inappropriate and urged citizens to boycott the vote. In response, the voting age was lowered from 21 to 18 and the number of polling stations significantly increased, whilst ID cards were not required for people to cast a vote.

== 2018 Pakistani general election ==
The 2018 elections were a turning point in Pakistan's political history, with the two dynastic parties, the PPP, and the PML(N) no longer winning the general election, with the PTI taking most of the seats.

Despite the PTI's chairman Imran Khan, calling the general elections the most "fairest" in the country's history, the opposition allege that the election was rigged in favour of the PTI. This is due to the fact that the Result Transmission System suddenly failed, allegedly to rig it in favour of the PTI.

PML-N supporters blame the army for orchestrating their defeat, and protests accused the army of "terrorism", including in Rawalpindi, not far from the army's headquarters.

== 2024 Pakistani general election ==
The 2024 elections happened amidst allegations of pre-poll rigging by the military establishment in favour of the coalition led by Nawaz Sharif's PML-N. It was also dubbed as the most rigged election in the history of Pakistan with social media users calling it the "generals' elections".

Prior to the election, the Election Commission of Pakistan (ECP) and the Supreme Court of Pakistan banned the usage of the PTI's electoral symbol, the cricket bat, forcing its members to run as 'independent' candidates.

On election day, the Pakistan Telecommunication Authority shut down internet access nationwide. The PTI accused the body of suppressing its presence on social media.

On the day after the elections, at 2 AM, the ECP was supposed to begin to release the provisional results for national and provincial constituencies. The first accounts showed the PTI winning overwhelmingly, achieving two thirds of the National and Punjab Provincial Assembly seats. In the early morning, the system crashed. The transmission of data was frozen when publicly released results reached around 60% to 85% of the vote tallying for most constituencies. When the system resumed, the updated accounts were found to be greatly inconsistent with the previous ones. The PML-N, the clear winner on 30 constituencies and still competing on 10 Punjab Assembly seats, suddenly came up winning in about 137 seats in total. On 16 February, in a press conference, PML-N spokeswoman Marriyum Aurangzeb stated that all Form 45s produced on social media as proof of fraud allegations were fake.

On 17 February, Commissioner of Rawalpindi Division, Liaquat Ali Chattha, called a press conference to declare he felt compelled by conscience to publicity confess his complicity on electoral rigging by returning officers under his command to manipulate results for at least 13 candidates. Furthermore, he blamed the Chief Justice and the ECP's Chief Commissioner as primarily responsible for the ongoing events and that they should be prosecuted. ECP officials denied the accusations classing then as unfounded and motivated by self-promotion, adding that a divisional commissioner had no direct role in the electoral process. However, on 22 February, Chattha, while under arrest, retracted his claims and apologized to the ECP, claiming that the PTI "offered strong position" for making the allegations and saying that Qazi Faiz Isa's position as Chief Justice "was taken to create mistrust in general public against him".

Foreign media, observer groups and other countries and organizations including the United States, the United Kingdom and the European Union have voiced their concerns about the fairness of the elections. The Balochistan Bar Association stated, amidst widespread multiparty protests in the province, that the 2024 elections were "a deep conspiracy against the supremacy of constitution and law".
