= 4 October 2024 Friday sermon =

Public prayer sermon

- Date: October 4, 2024
- Location: Grand Mosalla of Tehran
- Type: Khutbah
- Motive: October 2024 Iranian strikes against Israel
- Organised by: Ali Khamenei

The 4 October 2024 Friday sermon in Tehran took place at the Grand Mosalla mosque, attended by thousands of worshippers. The Supreme Leader of Iran, Ali Khamenei, delivered two sermons, in Persian and Arabic, lasting 40 minutes.

The sermon took place a few days after Iran's missile attack on Israel. The last time Khamenei delivered a Friday sermon was after the assassination of Qasem Soleimani in 2020. In his sermon, Khamenei described October 7 attacks as a legitimate action and expressed his support for Arab groups engaged in the conflict with Israel. The president of Iran, Masoud Pezeshkian, the head of the Parliament of Iran and senior military commanders, were seated in the front row of the ceremony.

== Background ==
On the morning of Friday, October 4, 2024, a ceremony was held at the Grand Mosalla mosque in Tehran to commemorate Seyyed Hassan Nasrallah, who was killed in Israeli attacks on southern Lebanon. Following this ceremony, Khamenei led the Friday prayers and delivered the two sermons. The prayers took place three days after Iran's missile attack on Israel. This attack was a response to Israel's recent actions in Lebanon and Palestine, as well as the killing of senior commanders from Iran, Hamas (Ismail Haniyeh), and Hezbollah.

== Content ==
In his Friday sermons, Khamenei praised Iran's missile attack in October 2024, describing it as a brilliant action. He referred to Israel as the wild dog of the United States. Khamenei emphasized that the primary issue he wanted to address is the unity of Islamic countries. He stated that all Islamic nations, from Afghanistan to Yemen and from Iran to Gaza and Lebanon, must unite against Israel. According to a state television report, Khamenei announced that if necessary, Iran would repeat the October attack.

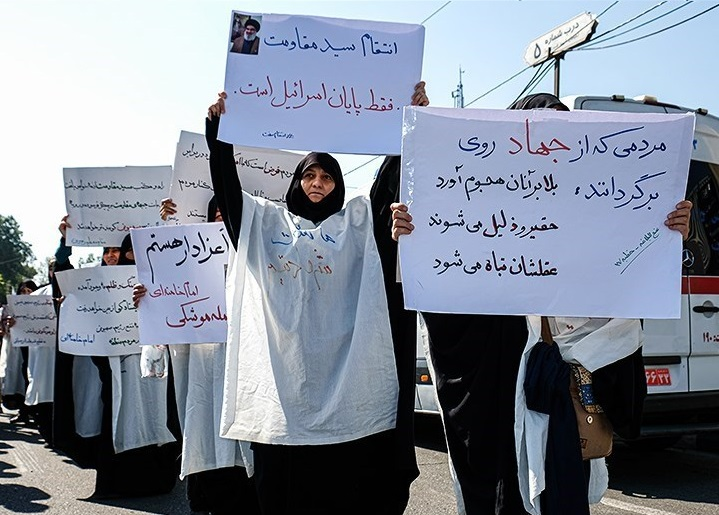

In a national television report, a woman dressed in white cloth—a symbol of death—held a child in her arms and stated, "We are not afraid of any threat."

== Reaction ==
The number of participants in the Friday prayer was estimated to be around a thousand Iranian individuals.

Al Jazeera English correspondent Resul Serdar reported that Khamenei conveyed a message to Israel by conducting Friday prayers during this critical period, indicating that the Iranian authorities were not seeking refuge. He believed that Khamenei's emphasis on unity, amidst the heightened possibility of war, served as a call for a coordinated response against Israel.

According to a BBC report, following the assassination of Sayyid Hassan Nasrallah, the leader of Hezbollah, there were indications that Ayatollah Khamenei had altered his location. However, by attending Friday prayers, Khamenei demonstrated that he had no intention of going into hiding.

The Guardian reported that the leader of Iran demonstrated the support of the Iranian people for the airstrike on Israel by gathering a large crowd at the Grand Mosalla mosque in Tehran. This show of solidarity followed the killing of Haniyeh, Hassan Nasrallah, and Abbas Nilforoushan, one of the commanders of the Iranian Revolutionary Guard Corps.

Sina Azdi, an adjunct professor at George Washington University and an expert on Iran's national security, stated that Ali Khamenei conveyed messages in his speech emphasizing solidarity with the authorities and Arab groups, as well as the necessity for domestic support in response to Iran's actions against Israel. Azdi noted that Khamenei's remarks suggest that Iran responds in a rational manner and will not act impulsively; however, in the event of an Israeli attack, Iran will certainly retaliate.
