= Grand Mosalla of Tehran =

Mosque in Tehran, Iran

Imam Khomeini Mosalla of Tehran
- مصلای امام خمینی تهران
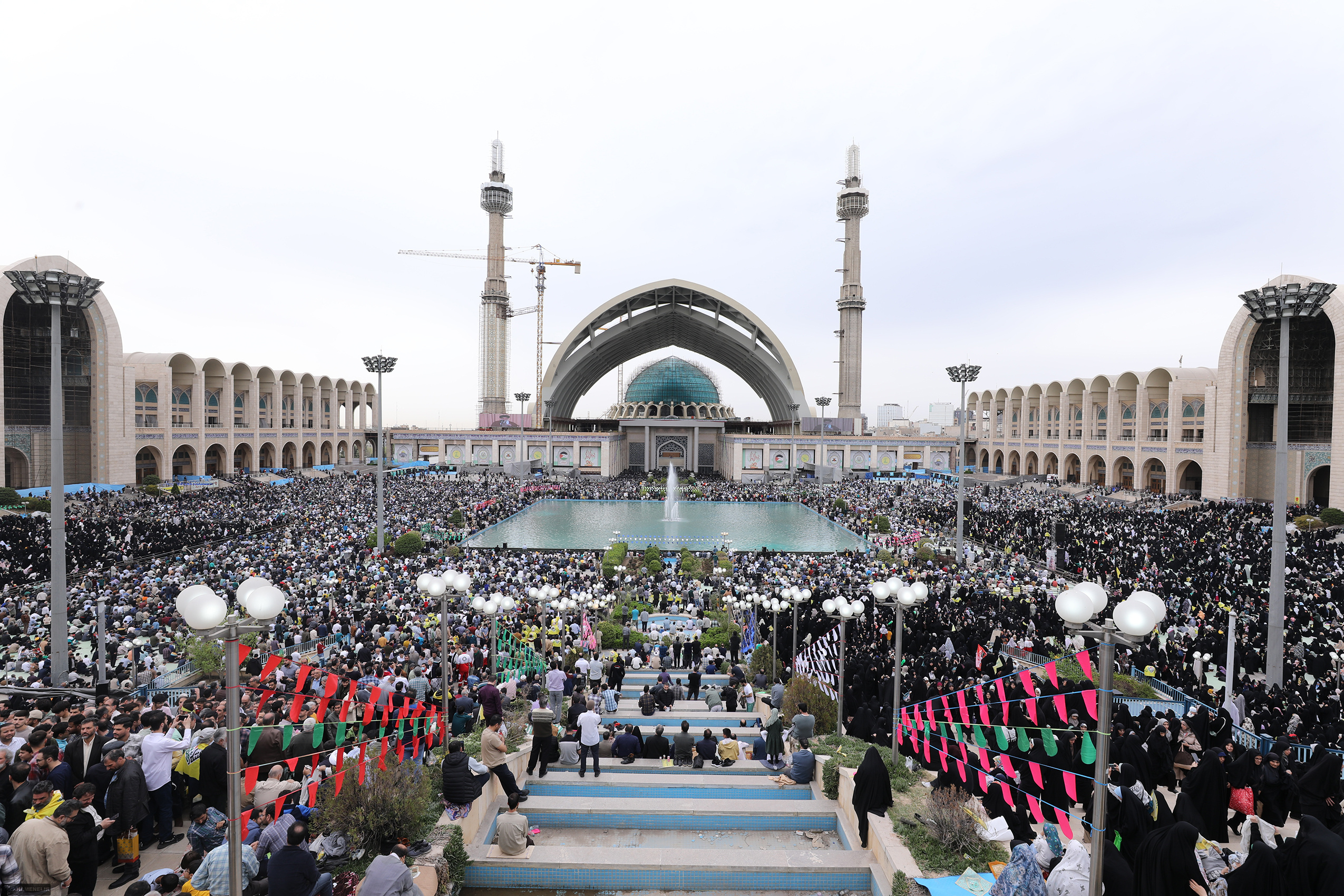
- The Mosalla in 2025

- Location of the incomplete mosque in Tehran

Religion
- Affiliation: Islam
- Ecclesiastical or organizational status: Friday mosque; Community center
- Status: Active; (despite incomplete)
- Named in honor of: Ruhollah Khomeini

Location
- Location: Abbas Abad, Tehran, Tehran Province
- Interactive map of Imam Khomeini Mosalla of Tehran
- Coordinates: 35°44′05″N 51°25′31″E

Architecture
- Architect: Parviz Moayed Ahd
- Type: Mosque architecture
- Style: Persian-Islamic
- Established: 1982
- Groundbreaking: 1990
- Completed: Under construction
- Construction cost: c.IR 100 trillion (as of 2017) (c.US$3 billion)

Specifications
- Interior area: 223,500 m^{2} (2,406,000 sq ft)
- Dome: One
- Dome height (outer): 63 m (207 ft)
- Dome dia. (outer): 54 m (177 ft)
- Minaret: Two (maybe more)
- Minaret height: 135 m (443 ft)
- Site area: c. 263 ha (650 acres)
- Materials: Concrete
- Elevation: 1,321 m (4,334 ft)

Website
- musalla.ir

The Grand Mosalla of Tehran, officially the Imam Khomeini Mosalla of Tehran (Persian: مصلای امام خمینی تهران), is a partially completed Friday mosque (jāmeh) and associated community complex, located near Abbas Abad in the city of Tehran, in the province of Tehran, Iran. The mosque is used for hosting weekly Friday prayer (jāmeh), as well as cultural, political, educational, worship activities, including book fairs, exhibitions, and religious ceremonies.

The Persian-Islamic style mosque has been under construction since the 1990s. Upon completion, the mosque will have the world's biggest iwan. When completed, the mosque will surpass the Masjid al-Haram in Mecca, as of April 2025, the world's largest mosque.

== History ==
The Grand Mosalla Mosque originated in a 1982 proposal to replace the University of Tehran as the primary location for weekly Friday prayer. A large section of land in Abbas Abad, the original site for the never-materialized pre-Revolution megaproject Shahestan Pahlavi, was allocated for the Grand Mosalla.

On 19 February 1985, a public announcement was issued, calling on talented and experienced designers to submit drafts for the mosque's design. The competition was held in 1986 with Mohammad Karim Pirnia, Mehdi Chamran, Bagher Ayatollahzadeh Shirazi, Ali Ghaffari, and Mehdi Hodjat as the jury members, and with the participation of 36 native and foreign individuals from Japan, Syria, Pakistan, and the Netherlands, as well as legal entities. On 1990, Dr. Parviz Moayed Ahd's design was confirmed for the Mosalla.

As of April 2025, more than 30 years after the design was finalized, the Grand Mosalla remained under construction, though finished sections of the building were in use. In 2017, the Financial Tribune called the condition of the project "dismal" and "unacceptable", and Governor General of Tehran Province Hussein Hashemi urged Tehran City Council to prioritize the mosque's completion.

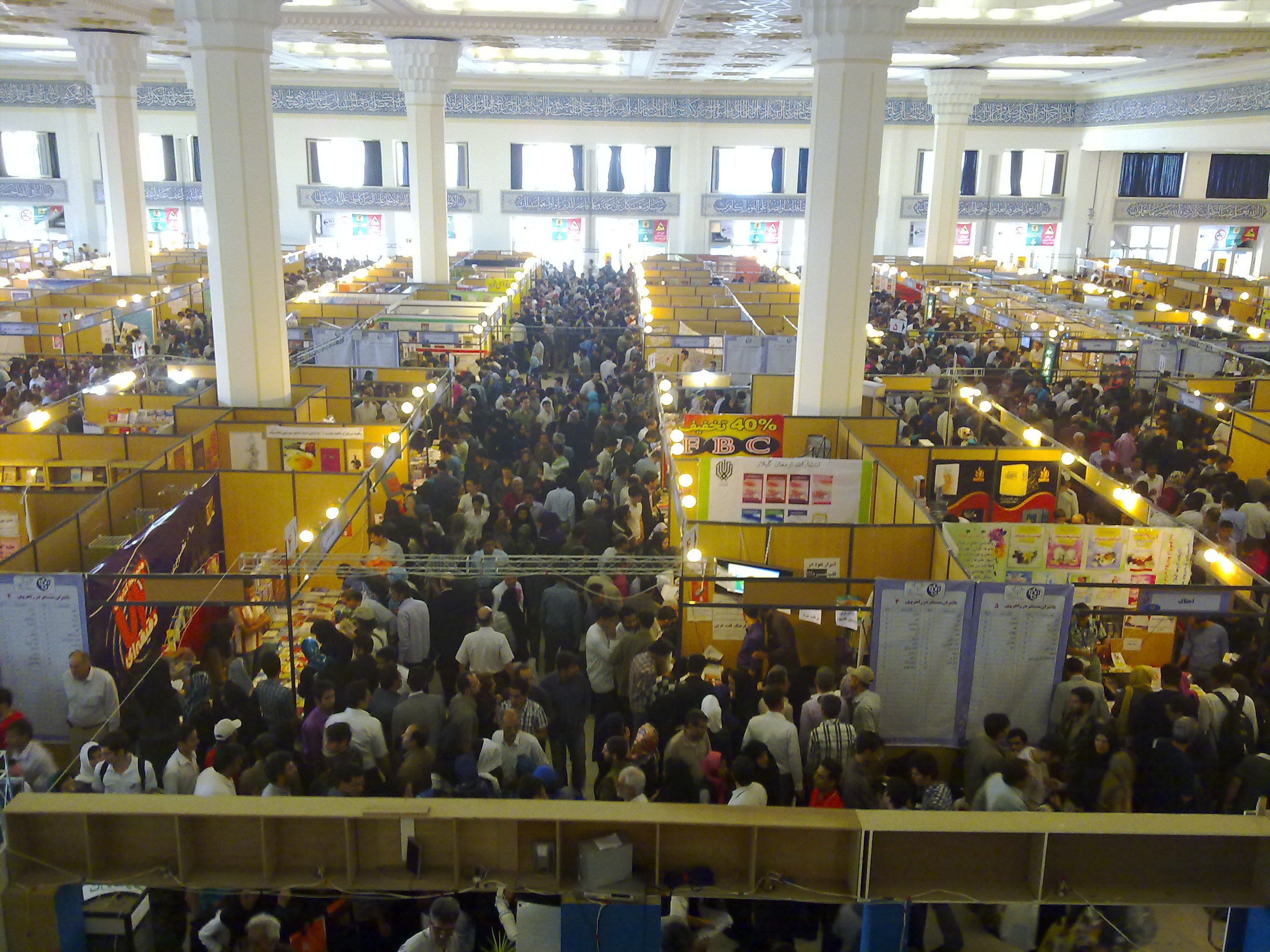
Shabestan of the Grand Mosalla during the 23rd Tehran International Book Fair

== Use ==
The Grand Mosalla Mosque is used for Friday prayer (jāmeh) and during Eid al-Fitr. Ayatollah Seyyed Ali Khamenei has led prayers at the mosque in 2024 and 2025 and the mosque was a focal point for worship following the sudden death of Iranian President, Ebrahim Raisi.

The mosque complex is also used as a community center and a venue for local and national events, including the Tehran International Book Fair, International Holy Quran Exhibition, International Exhibition of Investment Opportunities in Iran's Mines and Mining Industries, International Handicrafts Exhibition, and the Tehran Game Exhibition, among other events.

== Access ==
The Grand Mosalla Mosque is served by the Mosalla Imam Khomeini Metro Station, a Tehran Metro station located in the Grand Mosalla, next to the Qasem Soleimani Expressway. It also has a bus rapid transit station in Line 5: Science & Tech Terminal to Argentina Square Beihaghi Terminal.

== Gallery ==
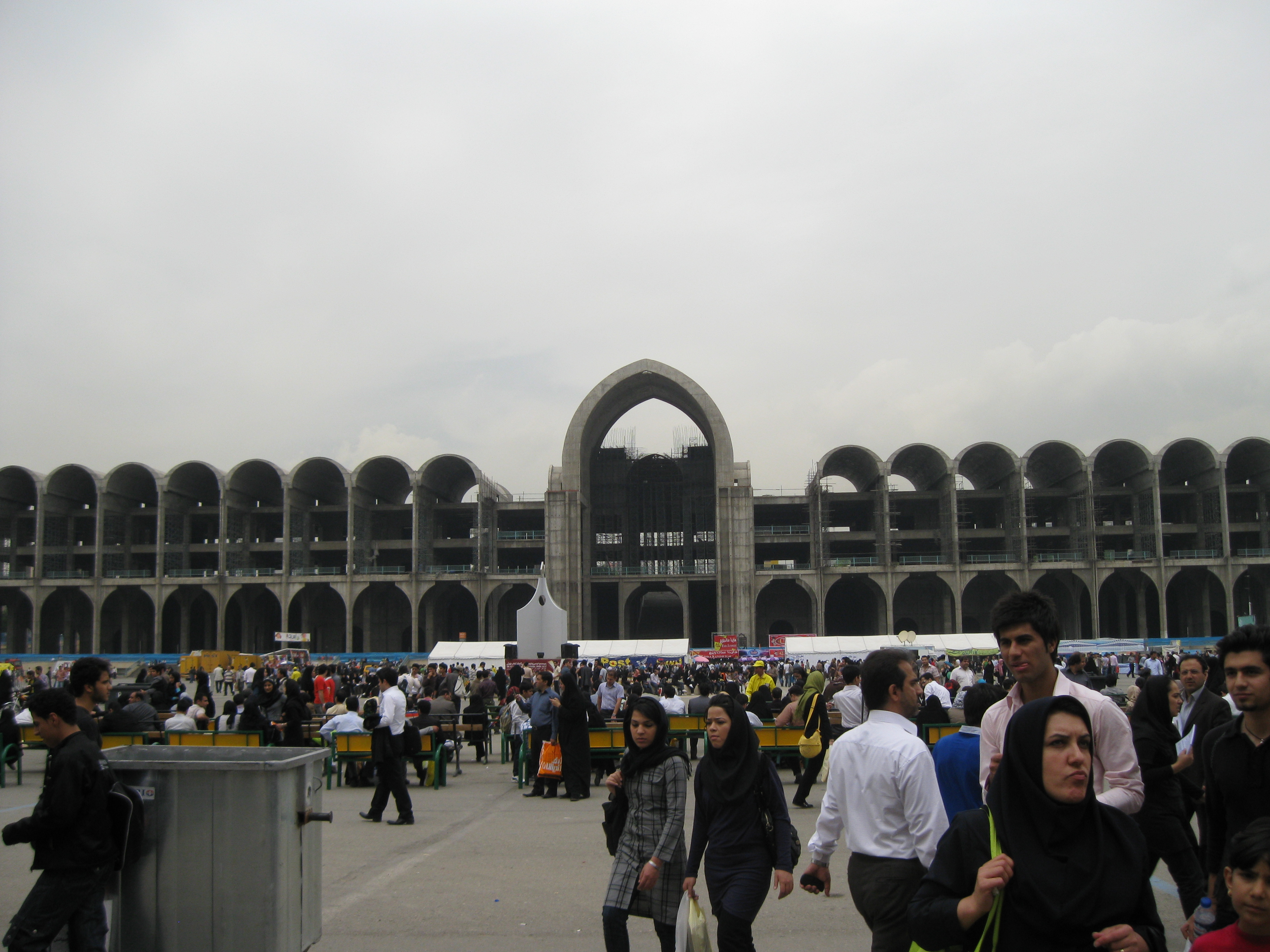

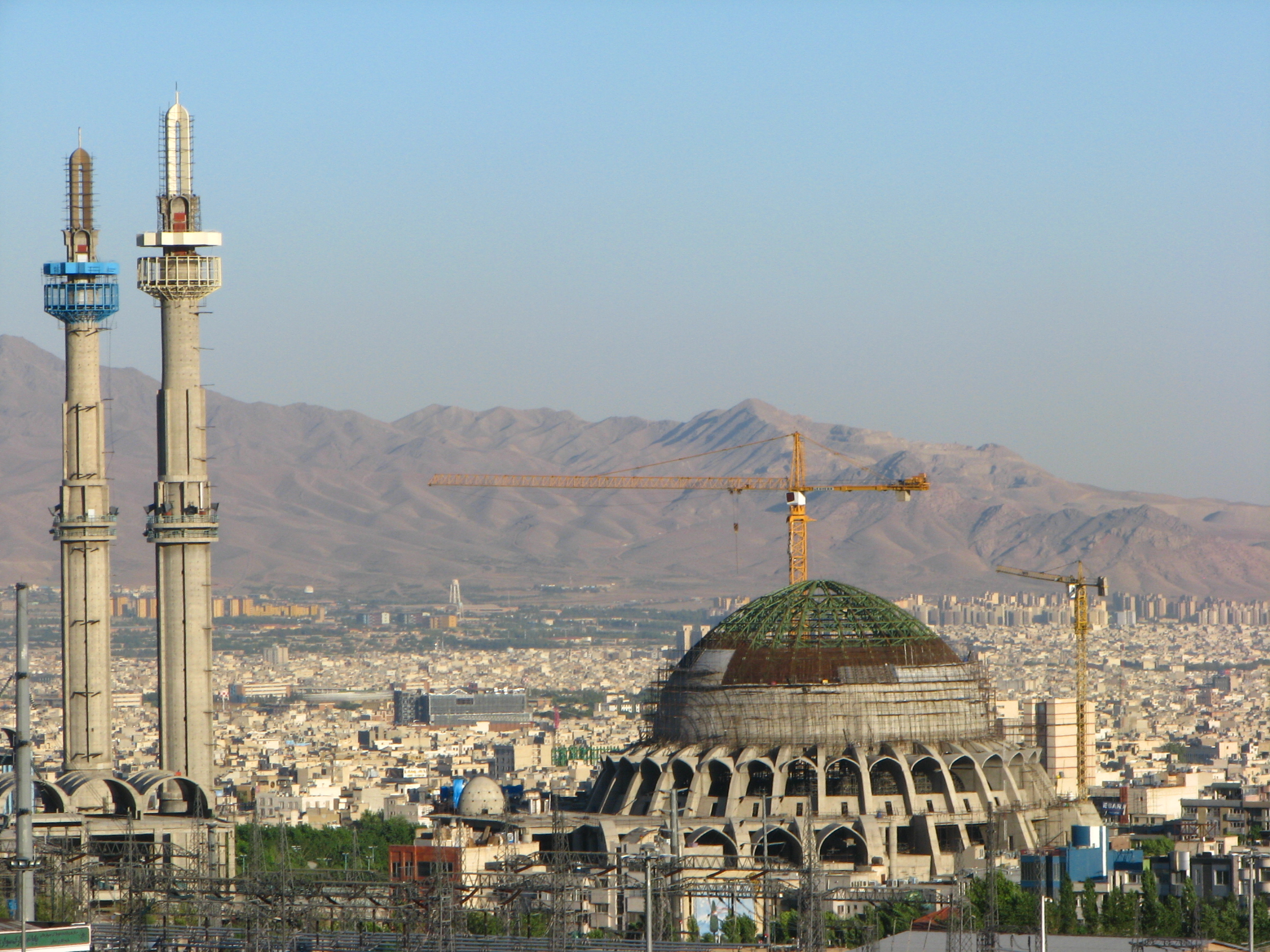

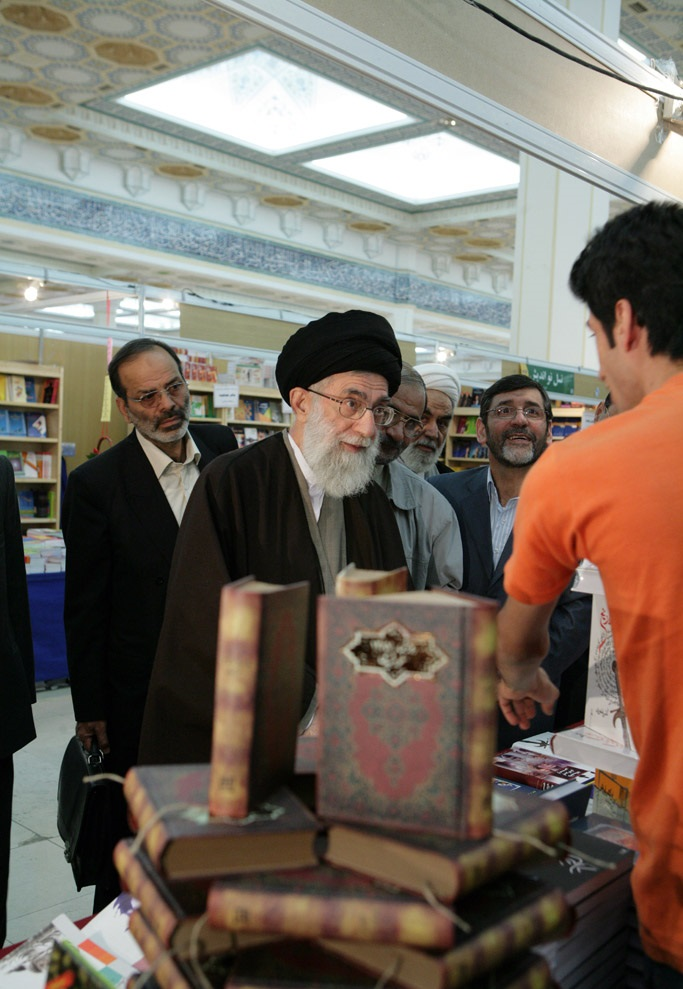

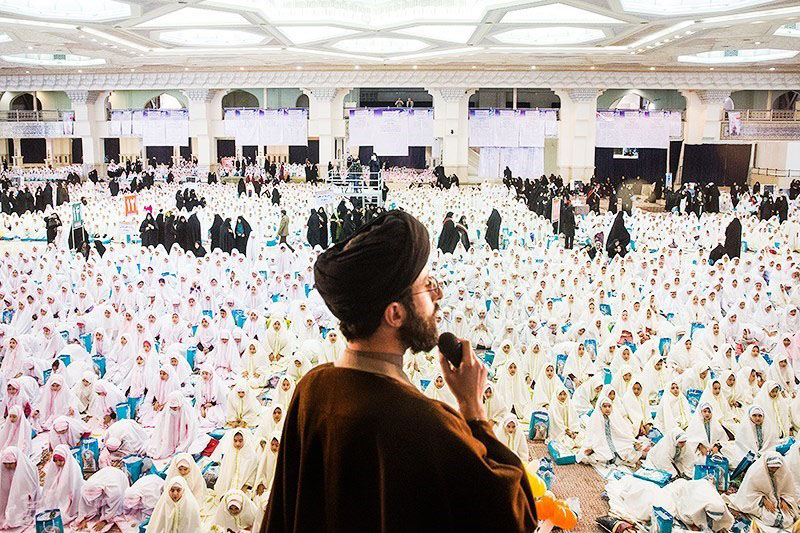

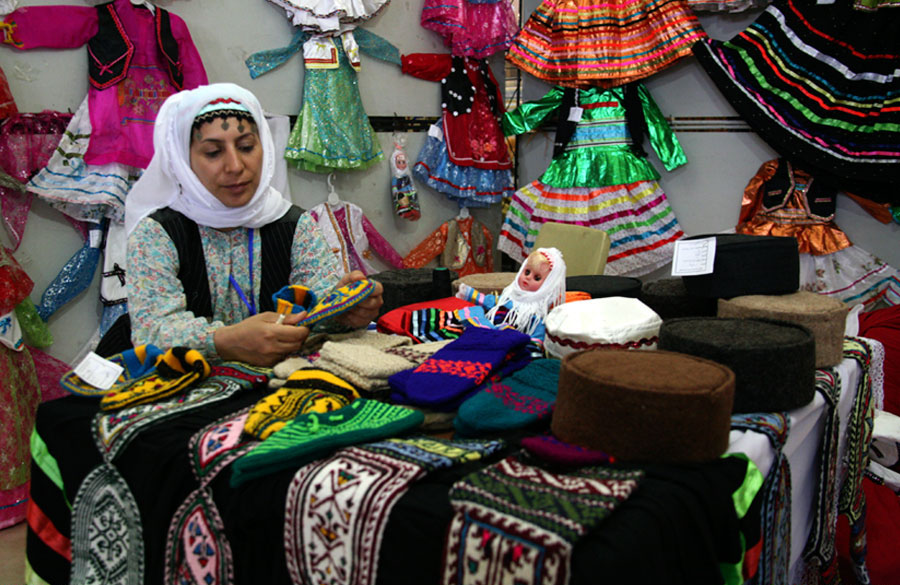

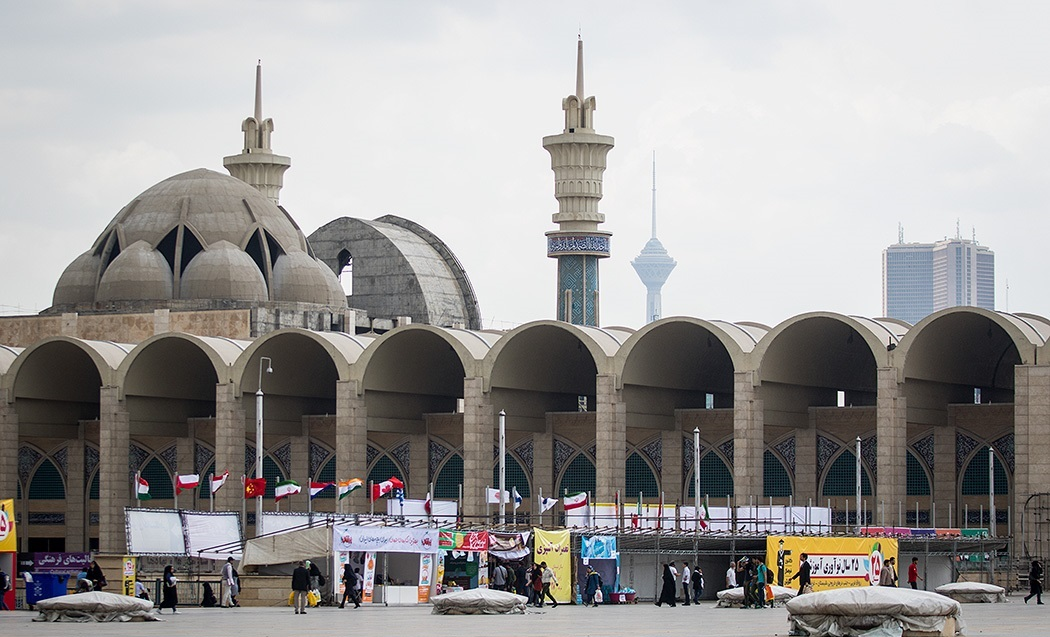

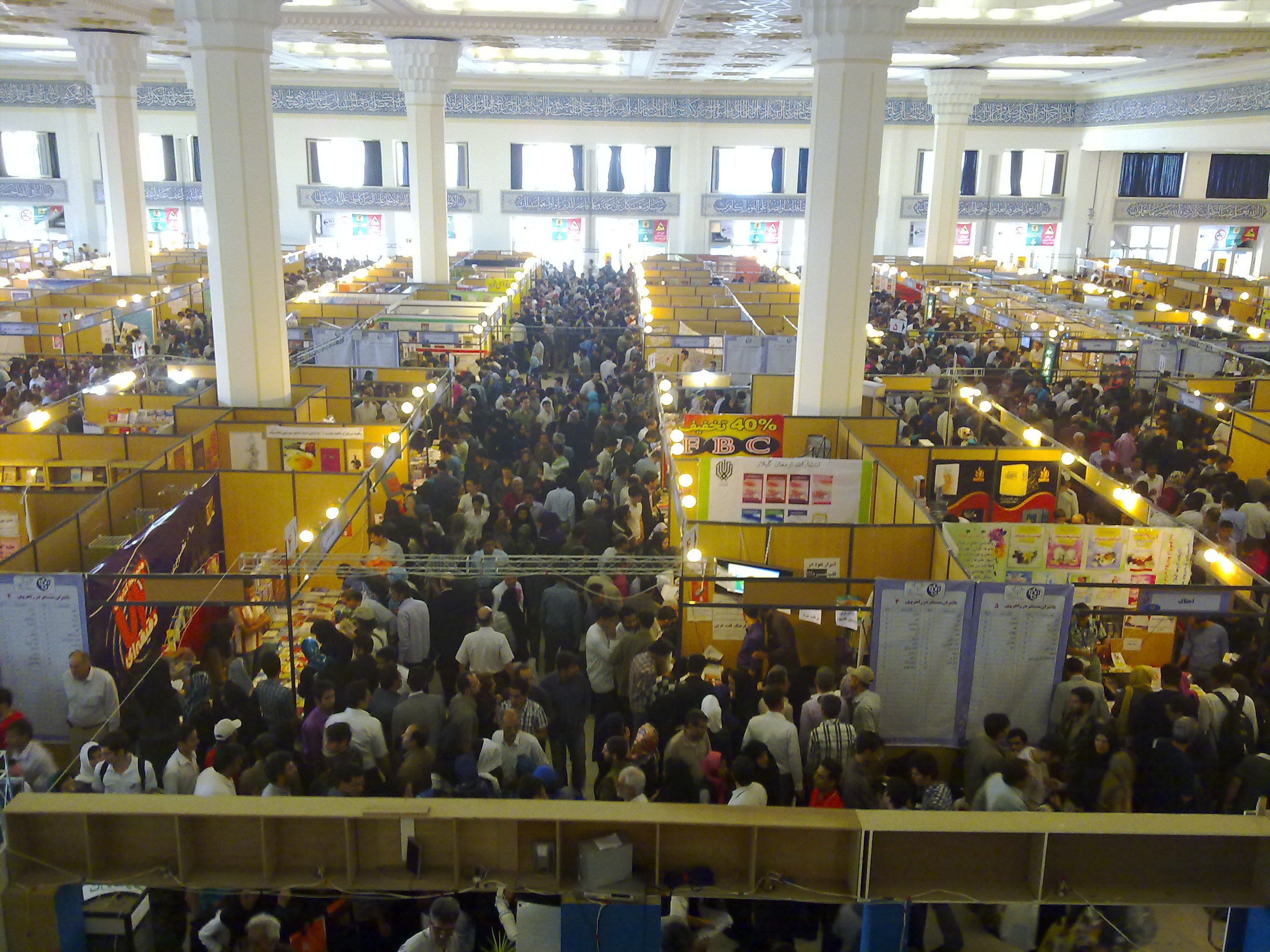

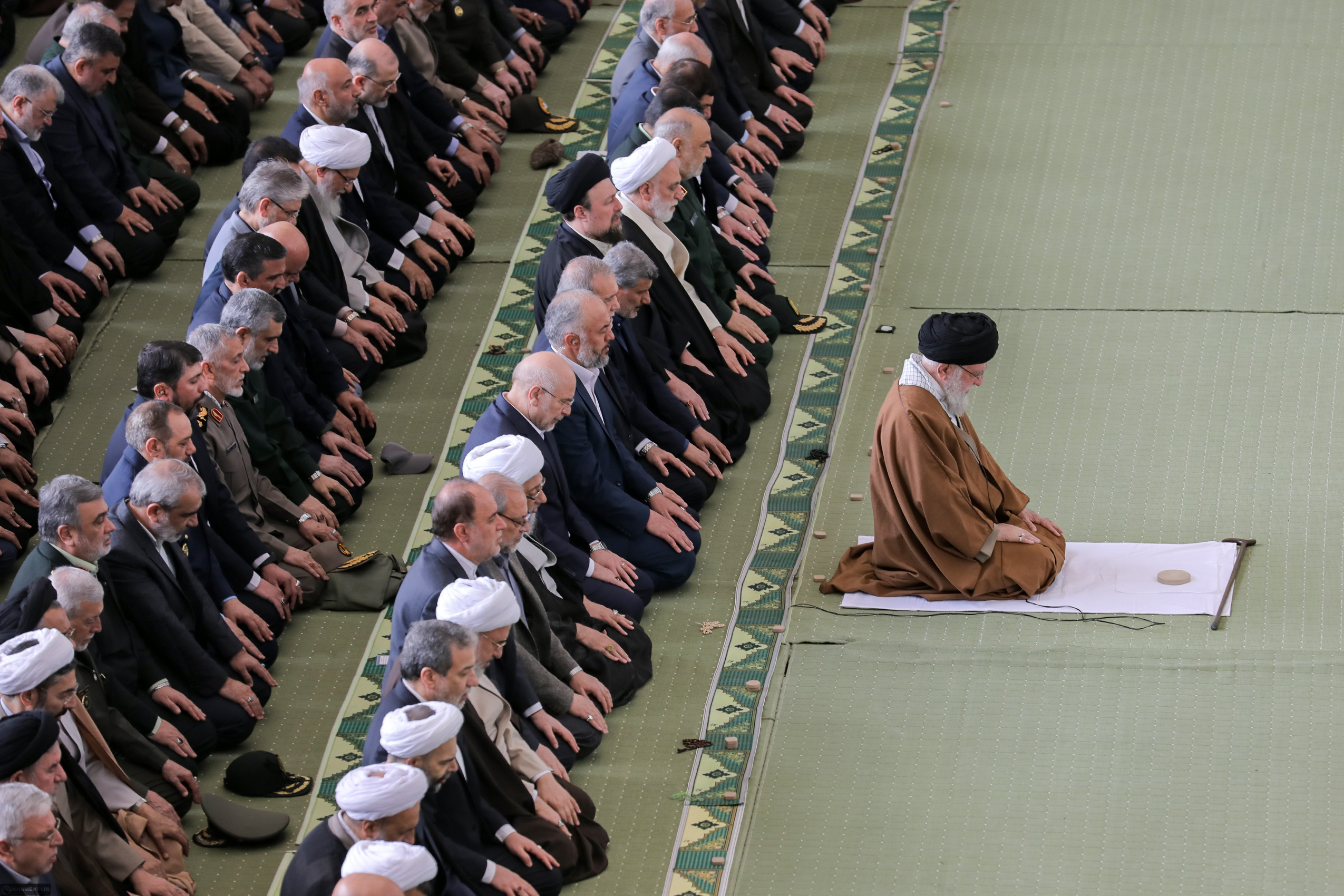
Ali Khamenei worshipping at the mosque during Eid al-Fitr in 2025

== See also ==
- Islam in Iran
- List of mosques in Iran
- List of largest mosques
- Jamaran Hussainiya, house of Ruhollah Khomeini
- Mausoleum of Ruhollah Khomeini
- State funeral of Ali Khamenei
