= State funeral of Ali Khamenei =

Funeral of the second Supreme Leader of Iran

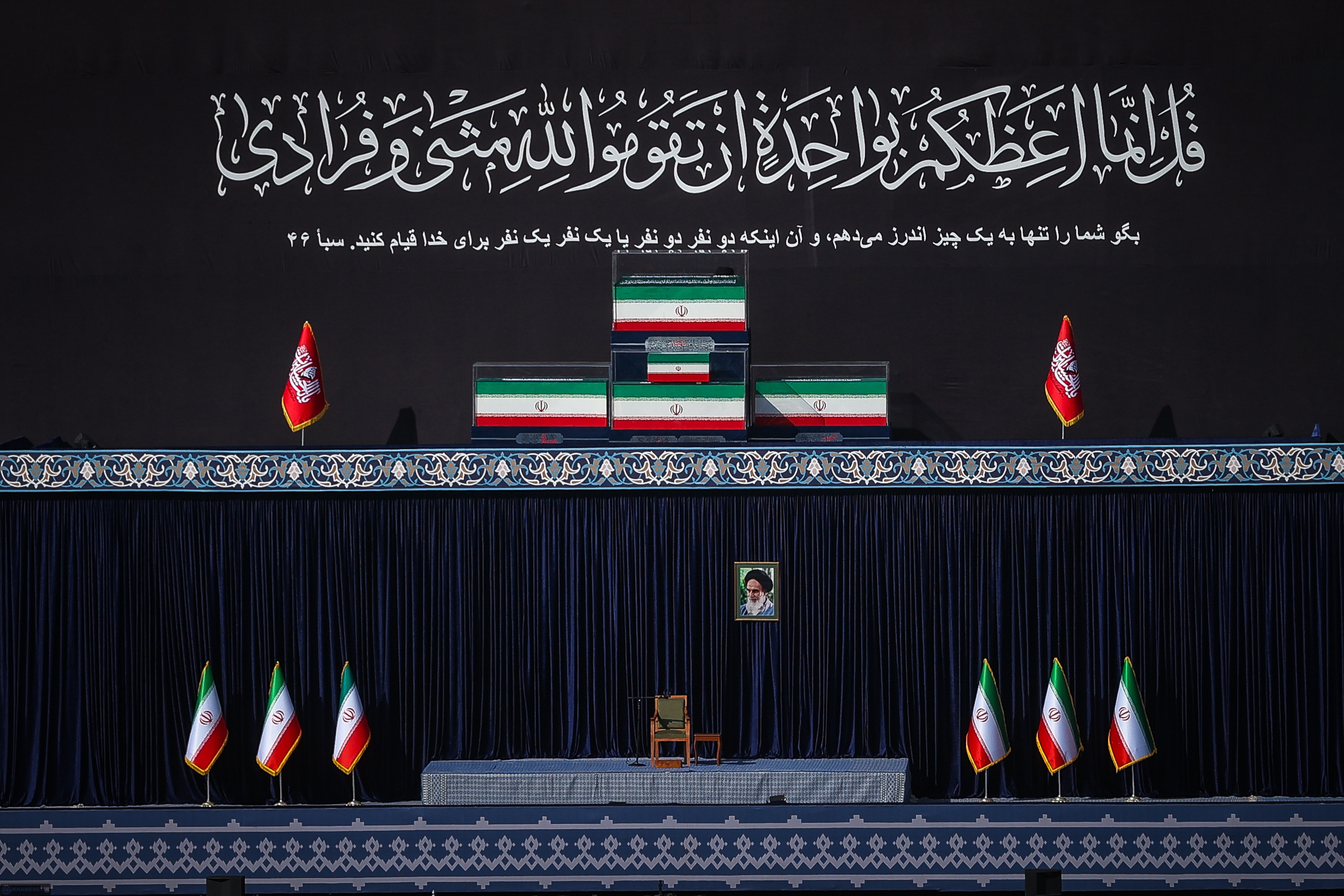
- Khamenei and his family members lying in state at the Grand Mosalla alongside Quranic verse Saba 46. "I advise you to do [only] one thing: stand up for [the sake of] Allah (God)—individually or in pairs."
- Date: 3–9 July 2026
- Location: Grand Mosalla, Tehran (lying-in-state) Imam Reza shrine, Mashhad (burial)
- Organised by: Ministry of Economic Affairs and Finance; IRGC Provincial Corps; Islamic Development Organization
- Participants: Iranian officials, clerics, and relatives (Note: in the absence of Mojtaba Khamenei, Iran's new supreme leader and Ali Khamenei's son); Officials from 30–100+ countries; Number of mourners: Fars: 41+ million mourners (including ~10 millions Iraqi; disputed); Al Jazeera: 12 million in Tehran
- Burial: Imam Reza shrine, Mashhad
- Victims: Ali Khamenei and 4 family members: Mesbah al-Hoda Bagheri Kani (son-in-law); Boshra Khamenei (daughter); Zahra Haddad-Adel (daughter-in-law); Zahra Mohammadi Golpayegani (granddaughter)

The state funeral of Ali Khamenei, the second supreme leader of Iran, took place from 3 to 9 July 2026, following his assassination in a US-Israeli attack on 28 February 2026. Several ceremonies were held in Tehran and Qom, alongside separate events in Iraq (Najaf and Karbala), before his burial at the Imam Reza shrine in Mashhad.

Major processions began on 3 July, with large rallies and foreign participants arriving. Hundreds of thousands of followers attended the first day of the funeral, and the Iranian government facilitated the event. The funeral procession in Tehran was attended by millions coming from all over Iran. The absence of Mojtaba Khamenei, Iran's new supreme leader and Ali Khamenei's son, from the funeral received global coverage, raising questions about his health and as to who is leading the country.

The funeral was originally scheduled to take place from 4 to 6 March but was postponed due to the 2026 Iran war.

Crowds carried banners of the slogan of the funeral, "We must rise" (Persian: باید برخاست, romanized: Bâyad barxâst), alongside a red clenched fist, symbolizing Iran's resistance against the United States and Israel. Mourners called for revenge, carrying banners threatening violence against Donald Trump and Benjamin Netanyahu, and chanting "Death to America" and "Death to Israel".

== Background ==
External videos
- Khamenei's death announcement on IRIB 1 – The Guardian
- Khamenei's death announcement on IRINN

Khamenei was killed by a joint US-Israeli airstrike at the onset of the Iran war on 28 February 2026 at 08:10 (IRST), at the Office of the Supreme Leader of Iran in Tehran. The Islamic Republic of Iran Broadcasting (IRIB) confirmed his death at around 05:00 (IRST) the following day. Members of Khamenei's immediate family, including his daughter, son‑in‑law, daughter‑in‑law, and grandchild, were also killed in the strikes.

== Prelude ==
The government announced a 40-day mourning period and a week-long public holiday. The public was expected to observe the body of Khamenei at the Imam Khomeini Prayer Hall at the Grand Mosalla of Tehran. It was reported in March that Khamenei would be buried in Mashhad, the city where he was born. The funeral was originally scheduled to take place from 4 to 6 March but was postponed due to the war. On 18 April, the Astan Quds Razavi foundation said that the burial location had not yet been decided.

On 9 April, the fortieth-day anniversary of Khamenei's death was marked with processions and ceremonies in Iran.

On 2 June, Iranian officials and state media announced that the funeral would take place over three days and would involve public ceremonies in several Iranian cities, including a 24-hour ceremony in Tehran. The funeral would be held on 4 July, corresponding to the 19th and 20th of Muharram and ending on 9 July, corresponding to the 24th of Muharram and the eve of the martyrdom anniversary of Imam Ali al-Sajjad, in Mashhad. Then, Khamenei and his family would be buried at the shrine of Imam Ali al-Rida according to Tasnim News.

According to statements from Iran's official commemorative committee and ISNA, the funeral and burial ceremonies for Khamenei were scheduled to include four members of his family been killed in the same attack: Mesbah al-Hoda Bagheri-Kani (son-in-law), Boshra Hosseini Khamenei (daughter), Zahra Haddad Adel (daughter-in-law), and Zahra Mohammad Golpayegani (granddaughter).

In the days following Khamenei's death, claims circulated on social media alleging that his body had been temporarily buried at the Shrine of Fatima Masumeh in Qom, before being transferred to Tehran for the funeral ceremonies. Officials at the shrine denied the claim. On 30 June, Iman Attarzadeh, spokesperson for the funeral committee, said that Khamenei's body and the bodies of his family members had been kept under protection in accordance with religious and legal requirements and that they had neither been buried nor placed in safekeeping.

The Iranian government arranged 50 million loaves of bread to be provided for the funeral. The governorate of Tehran province announced that the city of Tehran is preparing 5,000 mosques and 700 schools for pilgrims. Free fiber-optic internet access points were laid in 10 locations to accommodate users. Grocery supermarket stores were ordered to work 24 hours a day to accommodate pilgrims. The official motto and logo of the funeral was "Must rise". The SAIPA company prepared facilities to accommodate 2,000 Iraqi pilgrims.‌ One thousand tents were pitched inside Mellat Park for visitors and mourners by the Red Crescent. Tehran hotels offered 50% discounts during the funerals, and more than one thousand free cab vans in Tehran were tasked for the events.

Businesses, gyms, and the Tehran Grand Bazaar were reportedly closed for parts of this period. The authorities closed streets, airspace, and daily life in Tehran and Iran during the mourning events. U.S.-Iran negotiations over ending the war were paused for the funeral, though both sides separately said that some progress had been made.

== Timeline ==
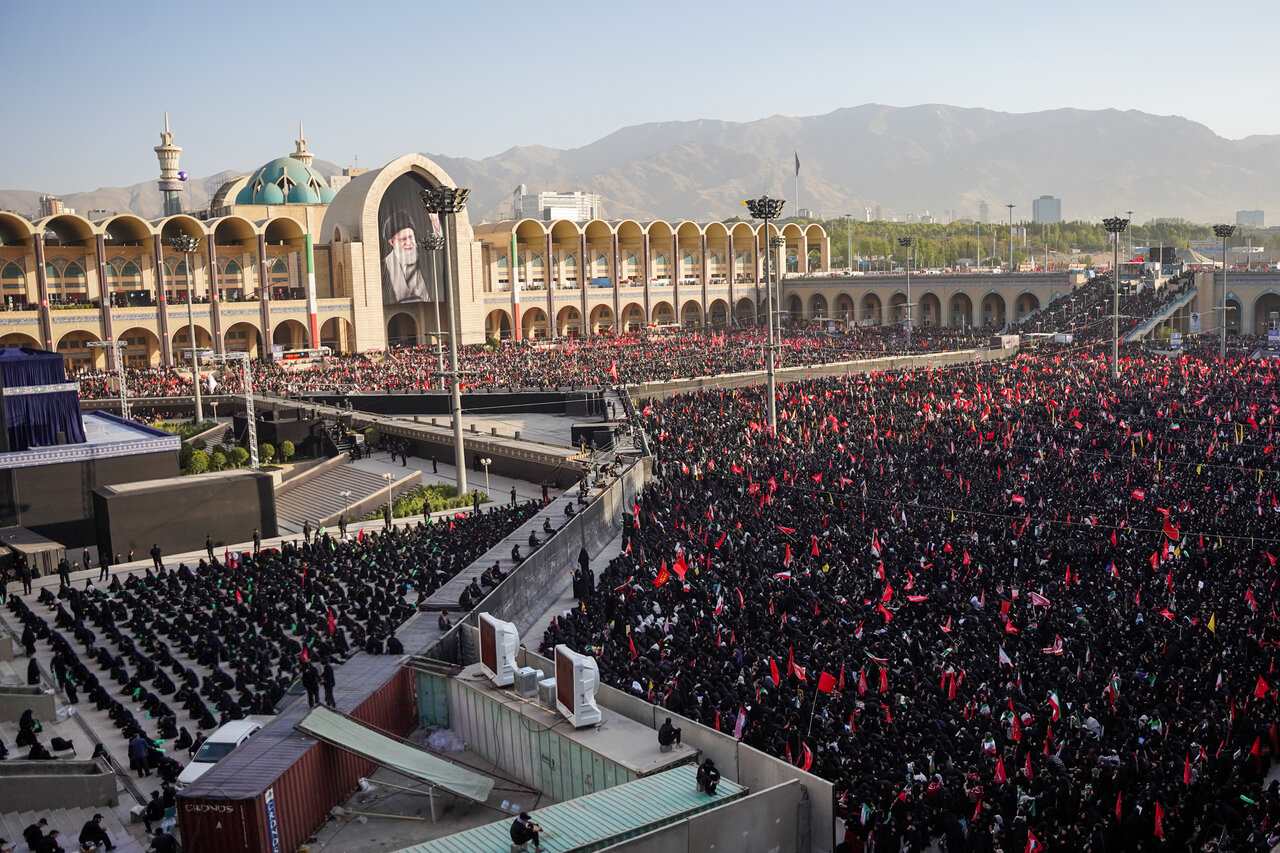
Farewell ceremony at the Grand Mosalla of Tehran

The national shutdown on 5 and 6 July 2026 was announced the previous day on state television.

Ceremonies scheduled times and venues
Date	City/Cities	Ceremony	Venue or route	Ref
3–5 July	Tehran	Farewell	Grand Mosalla of Tehran	
6 July	Tehran	Funeral procession	Damavand Street, Enqelab Street, Azadi Street, and Shahid Lashkari Expressway	
7 July	Qom	Funeral procession	From the Jamkaran Mosque to the Fatima Masumeh Shrine	
8 July	Najaf and Karbala	Funeral procession	Imam Ali Shrine and Imam Husayn Shrine	
9 July	Mashhad	Funeral procession	Imam Reza Street towards the Northeastern city's spiritual center	
9 July	Mashhad	Burial	Imam Reza Shrine	

According to reports from Iranian state media, farewell ceremonies were held in Tehran on 3, 4, and 5 July, followed by processions in both Tehran and Qom on 6 and 7 July, and a transfer of the body to Iraq on 8 July, before returning to Iran for final rites and burial in Mashhad at the shrine of the eighth Shia imam on 9 July. The Financial Times reported that the Iranian government prepared for between 12 and 15 million domestic participants over the six days of mourning. The events, originally scheduled for March, were postponed due to the war between Iran, the US and Israel. The significant delay between his death and the announcement of these dates fuelled widespread speculation, though it was believed that extensive security concerns and the potential for attacks played a major role in the timing. Authorities also faced the immense logistical challenge of managing such a large‑scale event safely, particularly in light of past tragedies such as the 2020 funeral of Qasem Soleimani, which resulted in a fatal crowd crush.

Building the perimeter walls around sites cost at least 60 billion toman. Some BRT bus lane stations' routes had to be destroyed. Around 2,000 people registered to volunteer to set up guest houses.

On July 9, two IRGC agents were killed at an IRGC checkpoint in Mashhad in a shooting incident, according to state media sites. Train services were suspended and travels were canceled after the Tehran-Mashhad railroad was destroyed in an airstrike after U.S. President Donald Trump ended a truce over IRGC missiles launches on three Arab countries and the Hormuz Strait attacks.

In June, in Revaq Keshvardoost, where the body was reportedly kept, Iranian hardliners staged a three-day sit-in protest against the Islamabad Memorandum with the US to end the war between the two countries and Israel. The mausoleum was subsequently shut down. Ali Abdollahi, commander of Iran's Khatam al-Anbiya Central Headquarters, warned the US not to carry out attacks during the funeral processions.

== Funeral proceedings ==
=== Funeral in Iran ===
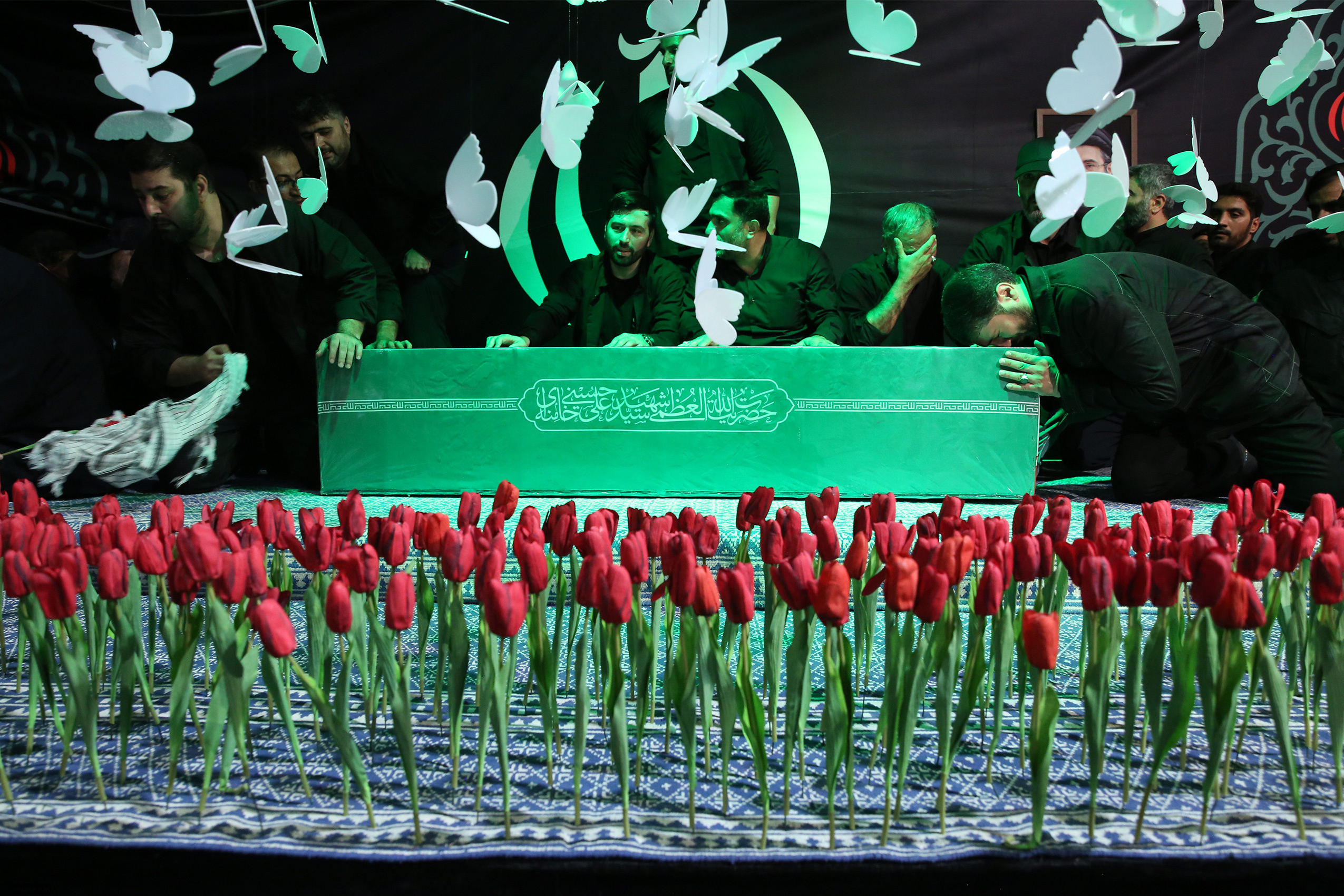
Farewell ceremony for Khamenei near the site of his assassination place

Khamenei's public funeral began on the morning of July 4 in Tehran at the Imam Khomeini Grand Mosalla, where thousands of mourners had gathered since early morning before the official ceremony was announced. Iranian state television announced that the official funeral would begin at around 6:00 a.m. local time. A large crowd gathered at the complex, while security measures were tightened and traffic restrictions were imposed throughout the capital. Senior Iranian and foreign officials attended the opening ceremony, with Qatari outlet Al Jazeera reporting that representatives of more than 50 foreign delegations were present and paid their respects. The dates of the funeral were allegedly chosen to coincide with the 250th American Independence Day.

Verses of the Quran were recited during the ceremony for different foreign delegations, with the passages varying for each group. Some Iranian media outlets described this practice as a deliberate selection rather than a routine recitation, suggesting that the verses carried political or diplomatic messages. Different passages were reportedly recited for various delegations, including a verse linked to the Battle of Badr for the Saudi delegation, a verse about the superiority of those who fight in God's cause for Turkey, different verses with distinct messages for Lebanon and Hezbollah, and a verse about loyalty to God's covenant for the Hamas delegation. Quranic verses read to dignitaries included verses from Al Imran; for the Qatari envoys, Al-Fath was read, meaning "God has forgiven you" which was used when Islamic prophet Muhammad made peace with the Quraysh tribe.

Mourners at the ceremony chanted slogans including "Death to America", "Death to Israel", and "Our word is one! Revenge! Revenge!" Banners displayed across Tehran during the funeral featured the slogan "We must rise" in Arabic, English, and Persian, alongside imagery of a clenched fist.

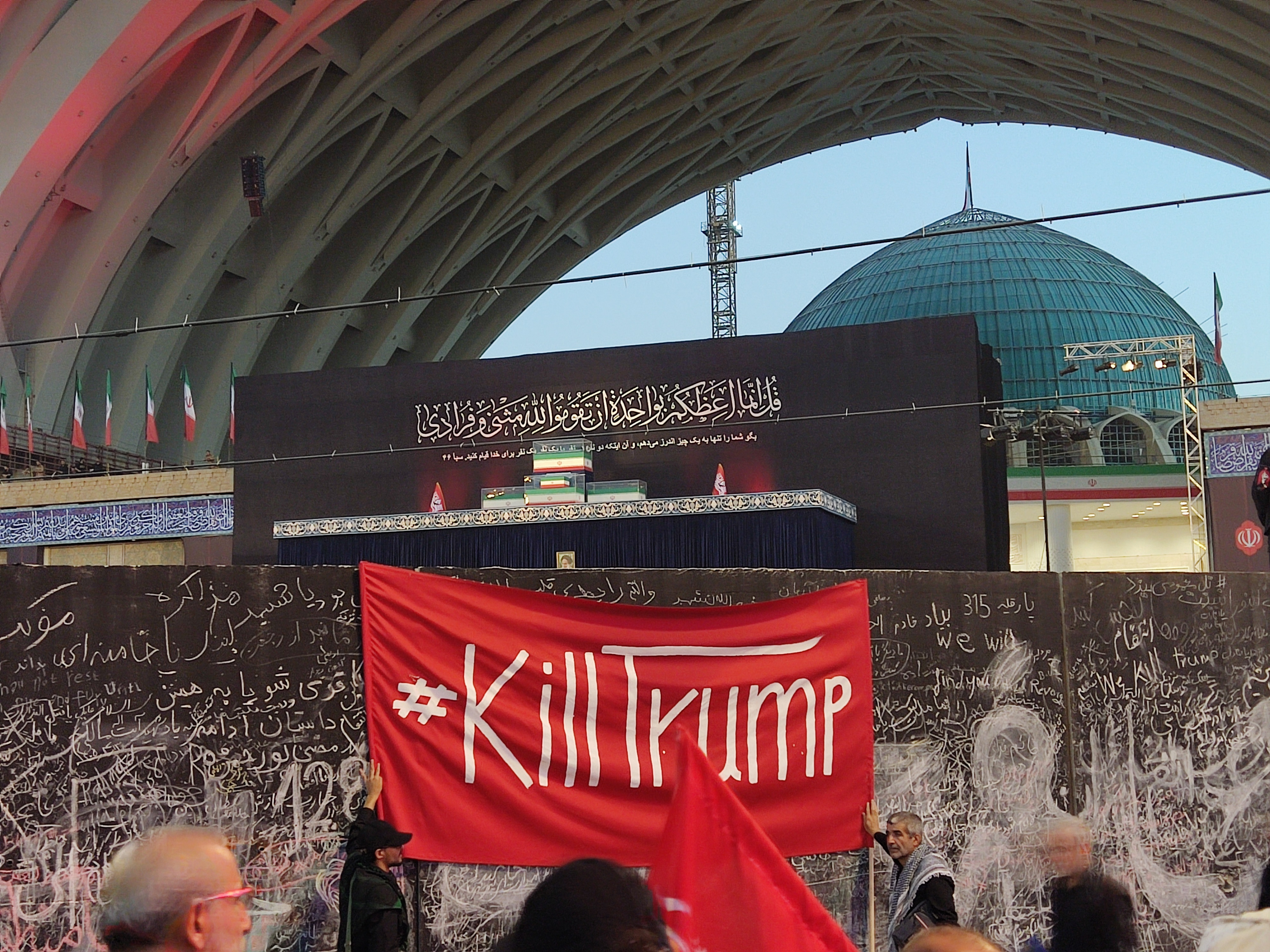
A banner reading "#Kill Trump" seen during the Khamenei's farewell ceremony at the Grand Mosalla, Tehran

At the funeral, which saw posters and graffiti calling for the death of Donald Trump and Israeli Prime Minister Benjamin Netanyahu, a poet demanded Trump's death in front of hundreds of thousands of Khamanei's followers who attended, even as Iran and the US negotiated a permanent end to the war between the two countries and Israel. The demand prompted cheers from the audience, as did his statement that "the world is no longer a good place for Trump."

In a report published on 4 July 2026, a spokesperson for the funeral committee announced that the farewell ceremony at the Imam Khomeini Grand Mosalla in Tehran would continue until dawn. He added that the funeral prayer was scheduled for 8 a.m. the following day and was expected to be attended by a large number of participants.

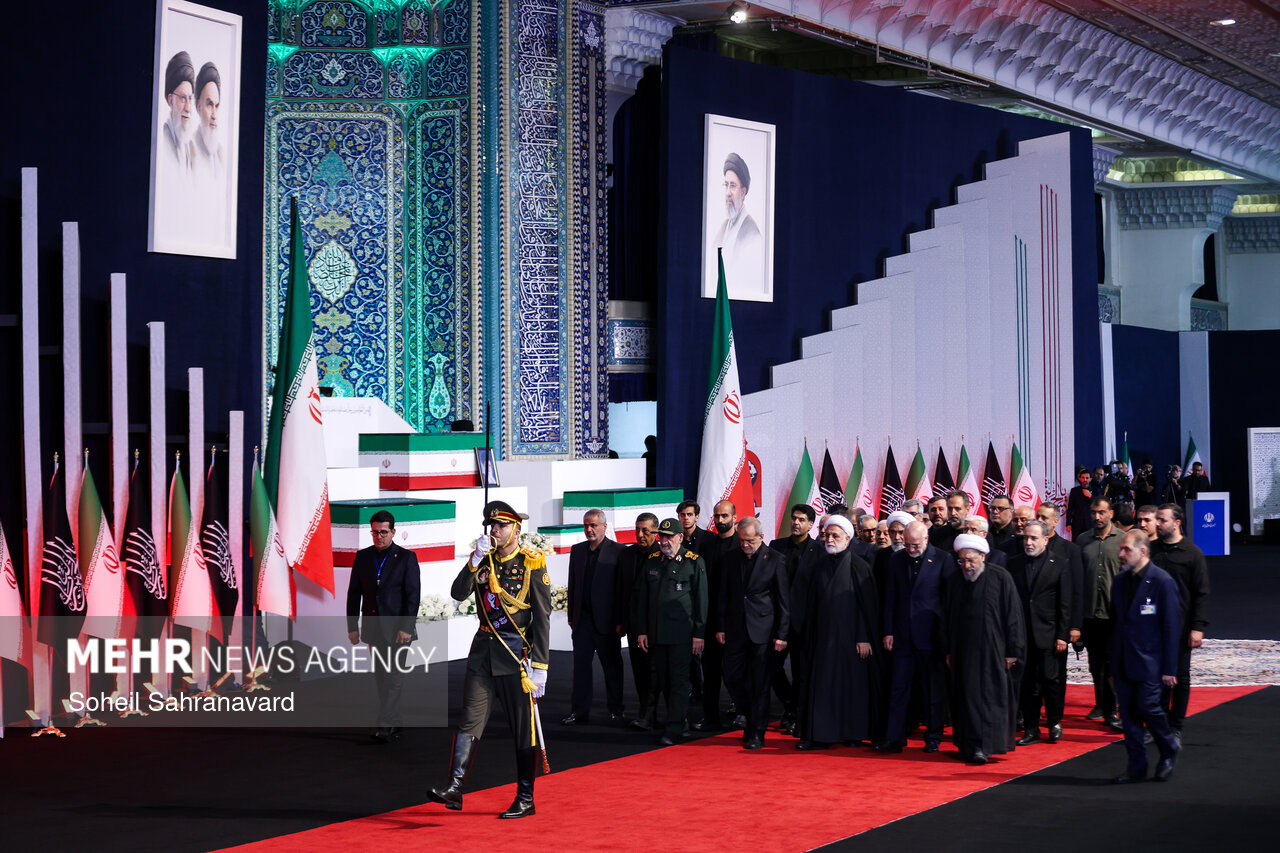
Iranian government officials walk past the caskets of Khamenei and his family

ABC News reported that a large crowd kept gathering at Tehran's Grand Mosalla religious complex despite the intense summer heat and road closures across the capital. Thousands of mourners wrote messages of grief on a black concrete wall separating the crowd from the platform where the coffins of Khamenei and family members killed alongside him were placed, covered with Iranian flags. The outlet noted that large numbers had gathered in Tehran, with the coffins remaining at the mosque until Sunday ahead of a planned 11-kilometre procession to Azadi Square on July 6, 2026. ABC also reported that some people travelled at least 750 km (470 mi) to attend the ceremony, while volunteers handed out food and water to help people cope with the heat. Mourners were seen crying in front of the coffins, and some called for revenge against the US and Israel.

The multi-day funeral entered its second day on Sunday, marked by huge crowds and chants calling for revenge following Khamenei's killing. It was reported that compared to the previous day, an even larger crowd gathered, with mourners dressed in black carrying banners and flags calling for revenge. The Iranian government provided transportation, food, and lodging.

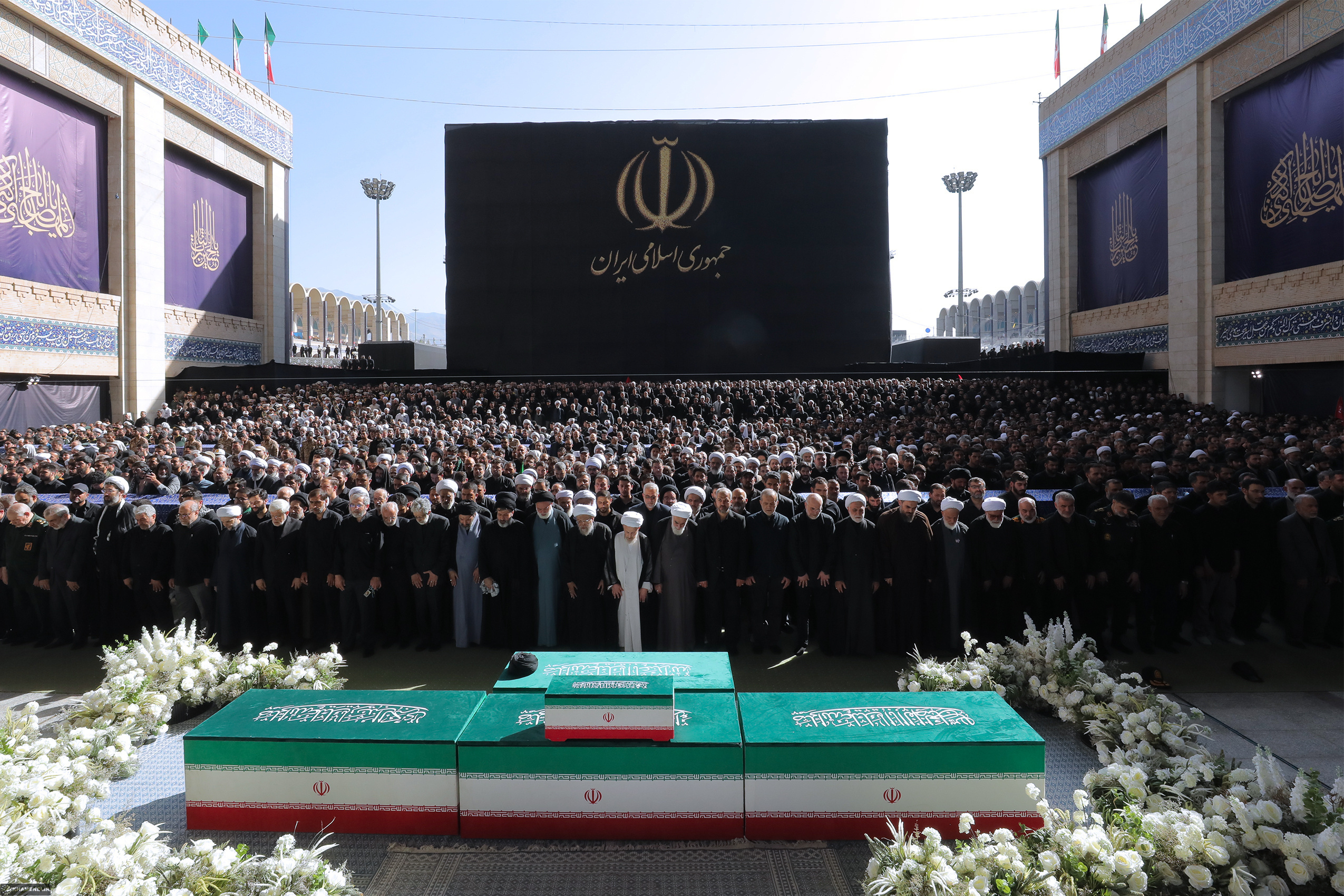
The funeral prayer for Ali Khamenei and his family in Tehran

On July 6, 2026, the third day of the funeral proceedings, the coffins of Ali Khamenei and members of his family were carried through Tehran as large crowds lined the streets and followed the route toward central areas, including Azadi Square. Reuters reported that during the procession, some mourners threw stones at a billboard showing Donald Trump. Along the route, banners and placards carried messages calling for vengeance against U.S. and Israeli officials, with some directly referencing Trump. Flags of the United States and Israel were reportedly burned at certain points. The Jerusalem Post also reported that mourners waved red flags, described as symbols of revenge.

The head of the funeral committee for the Leader of the Revolution and his family, expressing appreciation for the widespread public presence and cooperation, stated that efforts to transfer the body of the Leader of the Revolution to the city of Qom before the evening call to prayer are underway.

According to Mirtaj al-Dini, the Iranian head of "the Committee to Commemorate the Martyr Leader of the Revolution", the funeral arrangements for Khamenei's included steps such as: the Lailat al-Dafan prayer; holding public mourning, and mourning ceremonies in mosques and religious places, gatherings; public mourning at night, holding mourning ceremonies during Friday prayers across more than 900 cities in Iran.

On 7 July 2026, the fourth day of the funeral ceremonies, the proceedings continued in the city of Qom. Khamenei's body arrived in Qom on the evening of July 6, after the funeral procession in Tehran. The helicopter carrying his body and family members landed at the courtyard of the Jamkaran Mosque ahead of the farewell ceremony. The ceremony began at 6:00 a.m. at the mosque, where funeral prayers were led by Abdollah Javadi Amoli. Following the prayers, the procession moved along the Prophet Mohammad Boulevard toward the Shrine of Fatima Masumeh. Aerial footage broadcast by Iranian media showed the streets of Qom filled with large crowds of mourners, with reports describing the participation of millions of people in the farewell ceremony. Clerics and other attendees paid their respects at the coffins of Khamenei and the family members who were killed alongside him. Muslim delegations from Turkey, Iraq, Pakistan, and Afghanistan also attended.

The farewell ceremony in Qom concluded shortly after the noon prayer on Tuesday, July 7. The coffins of Khamenei and his family members were then transferred to Tehran for the next stage of the funeral proceedings in Iraq. The coffins were flown around the Shrine of Fatima Masumeh as a gesture of respect.

Other farewell ceremony programs include items among "Performing the night prayer of the burial", "Holding public mourning ceremonies", Implementing a national campaign to recite the Quran, pray, Environmental design of cities, squares, streets and public places. Installation of mourning flags, etc.

=== Funeral in Iraq ===
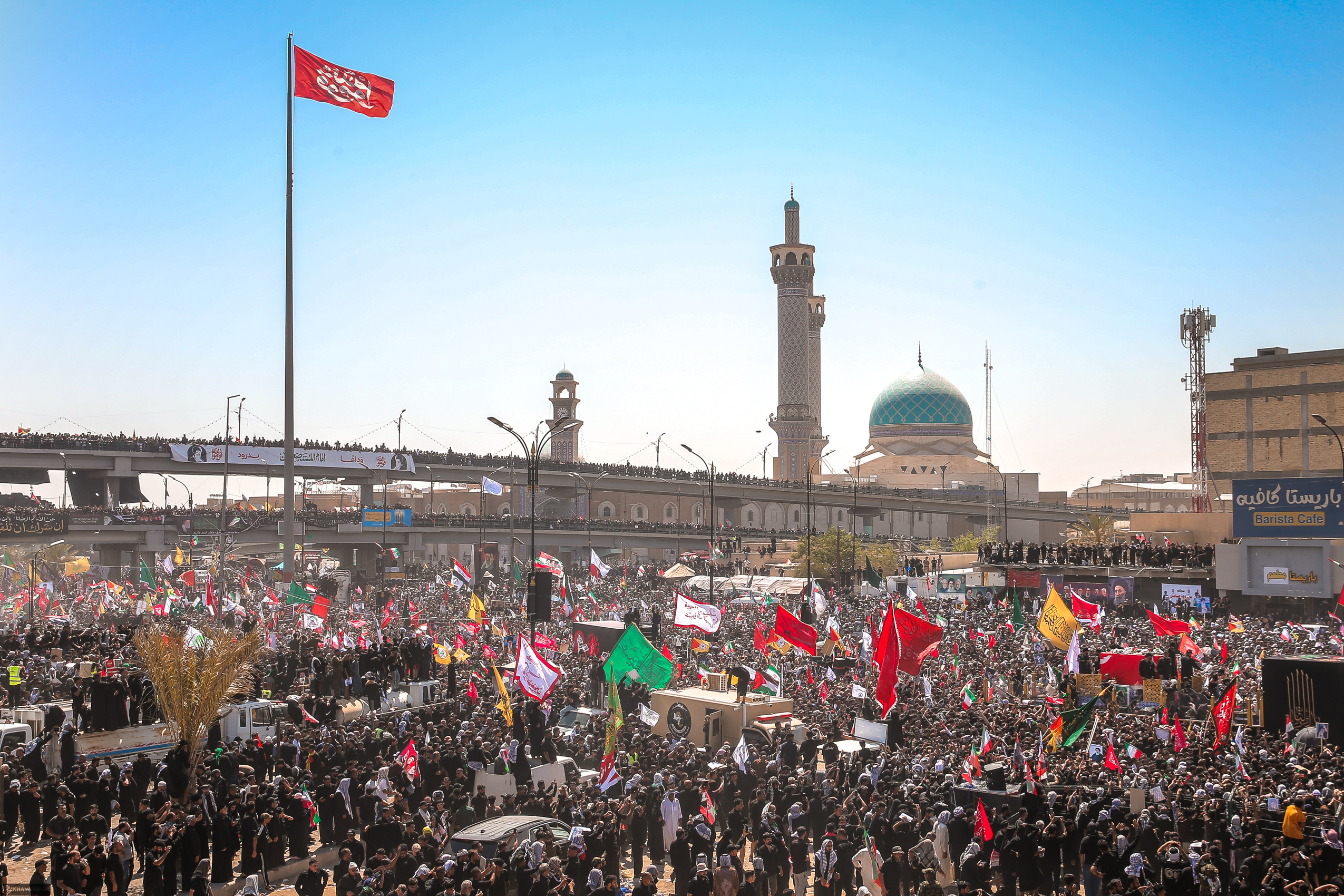
Mourners in Najaf

On 7 July 2026, after the funeral ceremonies in Qom had concluded, the coffin of Ali Khamenei arrived in the Iraqi city of Najaf. At Al Najaf International Airport, it was received by Iraqi Prime Minister Ali al-Zaidi, senior Iraqi officials, political leaders, and Shi'ite religious figures. Iranian President Masoud Pezeshkian, Foreign Minister Abbas Araghchi, and other senior Iranian officials also traveled to Najaf to attend the ceremonies. Khamenei's eldest son, Mostafa Hosseini Khamenei, was also present at Najaf International Airport during the reception ceremony. Thousands of mourners gathered across the city ahead of the funeral procession, carrying portraits of Khamenei, waving Iranian and Shi'ite flags, and taking part in mourning rituals.

On 8 July 2026, the fifth day of the funeral ceremonies, the public funeral procession in Najaf began at 6:00 a.m. local time. According to Saad Maan, spokesperson for the Supreme Committee for Funeral Ceremonies, the procession would continue to the city of Karbala at 4:00 p.m. local time. Khamenei’s coffin was carried through the streets of Najaf to the Shrine of Imam Ali, where funeral prayers were held. The prayers were led by Muhammad Taqi al-Hakim, a senior scholar at the Najaf seminary. Among those attending the funeral ceremonies in Najaf were Nigerian Shi'ite cleric Ibrahim Zakzaky, Iraqi Shi'ite cleric and political leader Muqtada al-Sadr, Iraqi politician and leader of the National Wisdom Movement Ammar al-Hakim, as well as Mohammad Reza al-Sistani and Mohammad Baqir al-Sistani, sons of Grand Ayatollah Ali al-Sistani.

The funeral procession in Najaf lasted for approximately seven hours, covering a six-kilometre route to the Shrine of Imam Ali amid large crowds of mourners. At the end of the procession, Khamenei's coffin and the coffins of his family members were carried around the shrine before the ceremony concluded.

According to Iraq's Popular Mobilisation Forces (PMF), more than 2.3 million people participated in the funeral procession, with the group stating that the number of mourners continued to increase as crowds arrived from across Iraq. Iraqi authorities declared Wednesday a public holiday for the funeral ceremonies, and a heavy security deployment was put in place as pilgrims and mourners arrived from across Iraq and neighboring countries. The funeral ceremonies in Najaf received extensive media coverage, with around 4,300 Iraqi and foreign journalists covering the event, including nearly 1,000 international journalists and approximately 3,300 Iraqi media workers, according to the Higher Committee for the Funeral Ceremonies.

Following the conclusion of the funeral ceremonies in Najaf, the funeral procession continued to Karbala. In Karbala, the procession began from Abu Mahdi al-Muhandis Street, passing through Republic Street before proceeding toward the shrines of Imam Husayn and Abbas ibn Ali. At the Imam Husayn Shrine, farewell prayers and religious rites were held. Abdul Mahdi al-Karbalai, the representative of Ali Sistani, led the funeral prayers for Khamenei at the Imam Husayn Shrine. The procession then continued through the Bayn al-Haramayn area to the Shrine of Abbas ibn Ali, where additional farewell ceremonies were held. Iraqi authorities temporarily closed the entrances to the Imam Husayn Shrine before Khamenei's body arrived, while security around the shrine complex was tightened. According to Al Mayadeen, authorities in Karbala recorded the attendance of around seven million mourners during the funeral procession. The procession in Karbala was followed by the return of Khamenei's body to Iran for burial in Mashhad. The transfer was delayed by several hours due to the extraordinary size of the crowds during the funeral processions, particularly in Karbala, according to organizers cited by Mehr News Agency.

In Iraq, Muqtada al-Sadr invited believers and pilgrims to participate in Ali Khamenei's funeral ceremonies and described Iraq as an important destination for religious visitors and the faithful.

=== Burial in Mashhad ===
Following the conclusion of the funeral processions in Iraq, Khamenei's coffin was returned to Iran for the final stage of the funeral ceremonies. Fighter jets escorted the aircraft carrying Khamenei's coffin and the bodies of his family members as it landed at Shahid Hasheminejad Airport. The aircraft carrying the coffins arrived at the airport in Mashhad at around 10:00 a.m. local time on 9 July 2026.

From the early hours of the morning, roads along the procession route were filled with mourners carrying Iranian flags, portraits of Ali Khamenei, black mourning banners, and handwritten tributes. Iranian media reported that millions of mourners attended the funeral procession in Mashhad, with large crowds from Iran and other countries gathering in the city. More than 4,700 foreign guests from 27 countries were reported to have attended. The final funeral procession for Ali Khamenei and his family members began at 2:00 p.m. local time on 9 July 2026 in Mashhad, Khorasan Razavi province. According to Mehr News Agency, Khamenei's coffin and the bodies of his family members entered Imam Reza Street in Mashhad, where the procession moved towards the Imam Reza shrine, where the burial ceremony was scheduled to take place. Mourners carried red flags symbolizing revenge and banners with anti-Trump slogans, including "We will kill Trump".

Due to overcrowding on Imam Reza Street in Mashhad, the coffin and the bodies of his family members were transferred by helicopter to the Imam Reza shrine. The governor of Mashhad, announcing on official Iranian television, estimated that 15 million people would attend the funeral. According to some estimates, the number of participants was twice that number. At the shrine, the funeral prayer for Ali Khamenei was performed by his eldest son, Mostafa Khamenei. After a private farewell ceremony was held, Ali Khamenei and his family members were buried at the Dar al-Zikr Riwaq within the shrine.

== Participants ==
IRGC chief general Ahmad Vahidi was spotted for the first time since the war in the funeral. Iranian authorities prepared for a funeral that could surpass the historic crowds of Ayatollah Khomeini's 1989 ceremonies. The event was expected to draw millions from across the region, including Iraq, Afghanistan and Pakistan with some Iraqi officials even suggesting a transfer of the body to Najaf or Karbala before the final burial. Some reports further extended the expected participation to Shia communities in Bangladesh and Yemen, describing the funeral as a transnational religious gathering with symbolic commemorations across the wider Islamic world.

According to the reportedly IRGC-adjacent, Fars News Agency, between 41 and 43 million people attended the six-day funeral ceremonies held across Tehran, Qom, Najaf, Karbala, and Mashhad. The estimates were based on public transportation records, mobile phone signal data, crowd-density calculations, and spatial measurements of the procession routes. Ihsan al-Awadi, chairman of the Iraqi committee overseeing the funeral ceremonies, said that preliminary unofficial estimates indicated that more than 10 million mourners attended the funeral processions in Najaf and Karbala. He added that the ceremonies concluded without any reported security breaches or major incidents. Persian-language fact-checker Factnameh disputed both claims, estimating the 40-hour Mosalla ceremony to have had between 600 thousand to 3 million participants; the claim for 10 million participants in Iraq was labelled as grossly exaggerated in the scale of Iraq's population.

The new supreme leader of Iran and son of Ali Khamenei, Mojtaba Khamenei, who has not been seen in public since his appointment, was not expected to attend the proceedings, raising questions about his health and as to who is leading the country. However, Khamenei's other three sons, Mostafa, Meysam and Masoud Khamenei, did attend.

Iran International, a UK-based news channel, accused several government bodies to require their employees to attend the ceremony in the lead-up to the funeral. In one case, the human resources department of Mobile Communications of Iran announced that all leave and remote work requests would be canceled during the week of the funeral. Another report claimed that employees in the municipality of the city's District 10 were ordered to attend. Critics described these alleged measures as an effort to create the appearance of broad public participation.

Mohammad Bagher Ghalibaf said in a statement that people should take part in the funeral, and that the nation's call for vengeance against the United States and Israel, following Khamenei's death, "must ring in the ears of the whole world."

The New Arab estimated over 10 million people gathered in Tehran for the funeral. Al Jazeera reported that at least 12 million people took to the streets of the capital to attend the funeral in Tehran. 11,000 buses were rerouted from cities including 400 from Qazvin, 500 from Central Province, 274 from Sistan and Baluchistan, and 200 Isfahan and Suburbs Bus Company buses to Tehran and Mashhad for the funeral's ceremonies rituals. Along with this, buses in Tehran operated around the clock. The North Eastern Railway Department of Iran announced that several additional train services were added to increase rail capacity for participants traveling to Tehran for the funeral ceremonies and to Mashhad for subsequent events. The department also allocated special capacity for the Semnan–Mashhad route during the ceremony period.

Tehran's municipal transport authority reported that public transportation services carried 23.7 million passengers during the three days of farewell and funeral ceremonies. According to the authority, 14,638,833 passengers used the metro, nearly 9 million trips were made by the bus network, and around 600,000 trips were completed by taxis.

=== International attendance ===
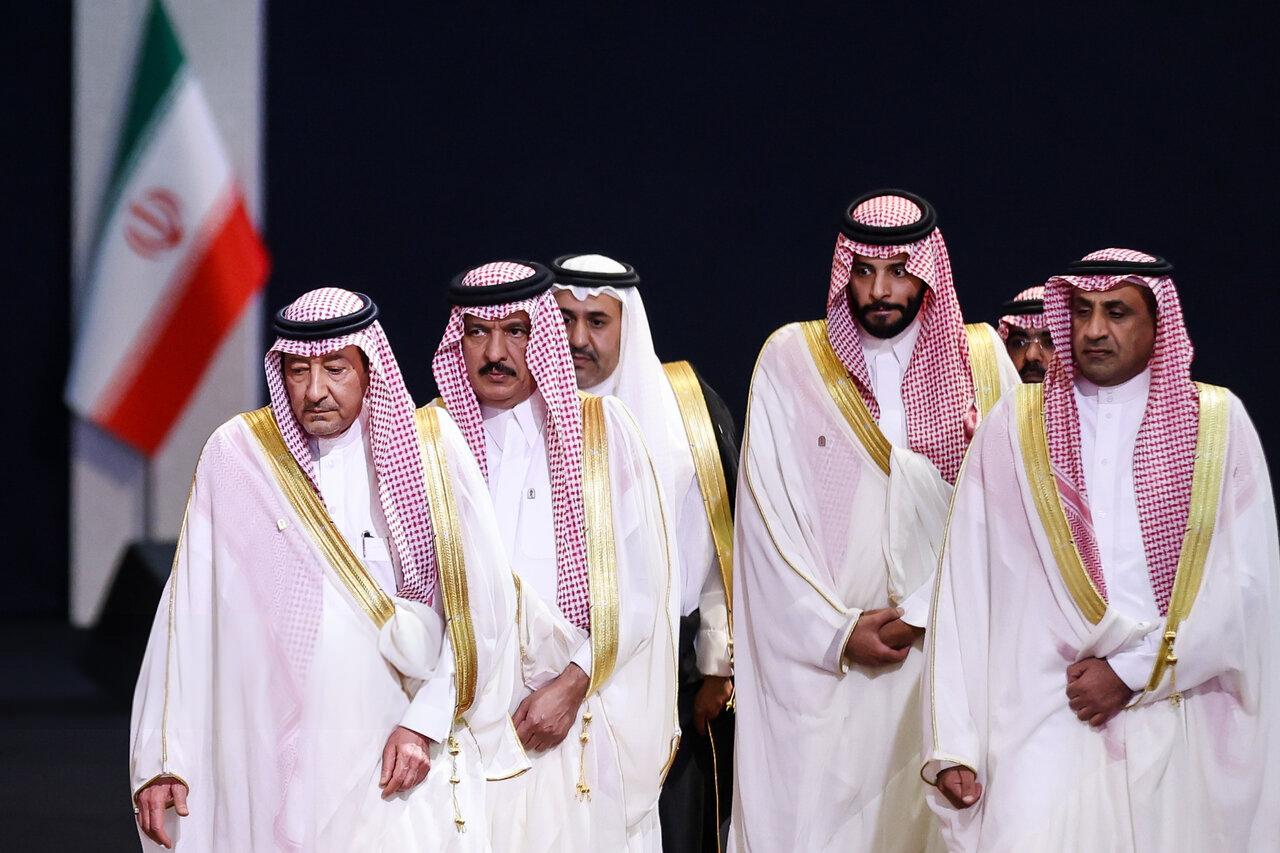
Officials from Saudi Arabia at the funeral

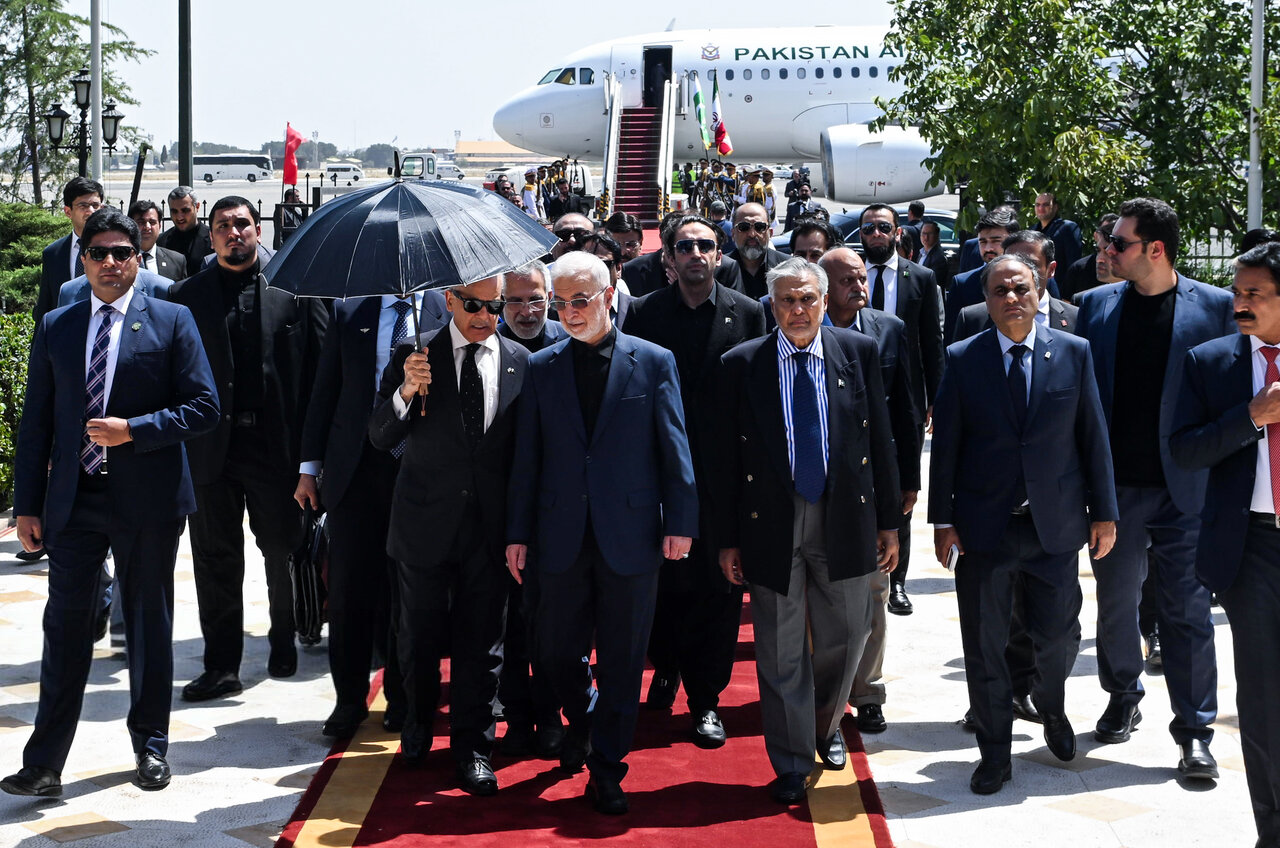
Shehbaz Sharif, Prime Minister of Pakistan attending Khamenei's funeral

According to the spokesman for the Iranian Foreign Ministry, neighboring countries of Iran would send high-ranking delegations to attend Ali Khamenei's funeral. According to him, at least eight heads of state and twelve parliament speakers would be present at the ceremony. He added: "A large number of countries will participate in this ceremony at the level of foreign ministers or other ministers or special representatives. Popular groups and personalities from about 100 countries will also participate in the ceremony". He also announced: "Official delegations, public figures, and members of parliament from Eastern Europe are also present at the ceremony, but we did not invite countries that took an official stance in support of the Israeli and American aggression."

Several of high-ranking international officials attended, representing around 30 nations. The delegation included several heads of state, such as the Presidents of Tajikistan, Georgia, and Iraq, alongside the Prime Ministers of Armenia and Pakistan. A number of countries were represented by their parliamentary speakers, including those from Azerbaijan, Bangladesh, Belarus, Egypt, Kyrgyzstan, Qatar, and Uzbekistan. Other nations sent their top diplomats, with Ministers of Foreign Affairs attending from Burkina Faso, Kazakhstan, Nicaragua, and Saudi Arabia, while Lebanon was represented by its Minister of National Defense and Serbia by its Minister of Information. Notable senior figures also included China's Vice Chairperson of the National People's Congress, Russia's Deputy Chairman of the Security Council, Turkey's Vice-President, and Afghanistan's Deputy Prime Minister. Additionally, the President of the Kurdistan Region of Iraq joined the gathering, along with the Deputy Speaker of Sri Lanka. Myanmar's president Tin Aung San attended, along with Mohamad Sabu, the Malaysian Minister of Agriculture and Food Security.

Despite this, news reports noted the absence of Western leaders and senior officials from the funeral, noting that the countries that did send representatives were largely represented by lower-level officials rather than heads of state or other senior leaders.

2,500 free visas were issued to Afghanistan. The Taliban-led government (Note: Since 2021, this government has been controlled by the Taliban as the Islamic Emirate of Afghanistan, which is recognized by one UN member state, Russia; while the rest of the international community recognizes the former Islamic Republic of Afghanistan as the legal government of the country without territorial control.) sent Foreign Minister Amir Khan Muttaqi to participate in the funeral, in addition, Afghan media reported that the first deputy prime minister for economic affairs, Abdul Ghani Baradar, would also attend the state funeral. Anti-Taliban organization National Resistance Front (NRF) led a delegation headed by leader Ahmad Massoud and also included Haji Muhammad Muhaqiq. On 19 June, Prime Minister of Pakistan Shehbaz Sharif confirmed his attendance at the funeral, on 3 July, Pakistani army chief Field Marshal Asim Munir and Interior Minister Mohsin Naqvi landed in Tehran to attend the funeral. Other dignitaries in attendance included He Wei, Vice Chairperson of the Standing Committee of the National People's Congress representing China, and former Russian president and prime minister Dmitry Medvedev.

On 29 June, reports confirmed that Governor of Bihar Lt Gen Syed Ata Hasnain and Minister of State for External Affairs Pabitra Margherita of India would attend the funeral ceremony in Iran. On 30 June, Ali Akbar Pourjamshidian, secretary of the National Funeral and Farewell Ceremony Committee, announced that an official ceremony for foreign dignitaries to pay their respects would be held in Tehran on 3 July. He stated that officials from more than 30 countries had requested to attend, while religious leaders and scholars representing more than 90 countries had also expressed their intention to participate. On 3 July, Saudi Arabian Foreign Minister Waleed A. Elkhereiji and a delegation attended the funeral. On 4 July, Reuters reported that Iraqi officials attended the funeral. It also reported that the families of Hezbollah leader Hassan Nasrallah and senior commander Imad Mughniyeh attended the ceremony. 1.7 million (Note: This figure is presumably rounded.) Iraqis registered for the free trip to Iran for the funeral.

Indonesia was represented by their ambassador of Iran and Turkmenistan, Rolliyansyah Soemirat. The decision to have the ambassador attending the funeral was criticized by the Indonesian public. Foreign minister Sugiono answered criticisms towards the lack of a high-level delegation, stating that the government has communicated to Iran regarding the decision due to scheduling conflicts of high-level officials. Regardless, Sugiono stated that a high-level delegation from Indonesia would attend the funeral on 9 July, led by himself and Speaker of the People's Consultative Assembly Ahmad Muzani.

Officials from Hamas and Yemen's Houthis also attended the funeral. The groups are members of the Axis of Resistance, an informal alliance that Iran has long supported primarily to counter the influence of Iran's rivals in the West Asia: the United States, Israel, Saudi Arabia, the United Arab Emirates, and sometimes Turkey.

== Reactions ==
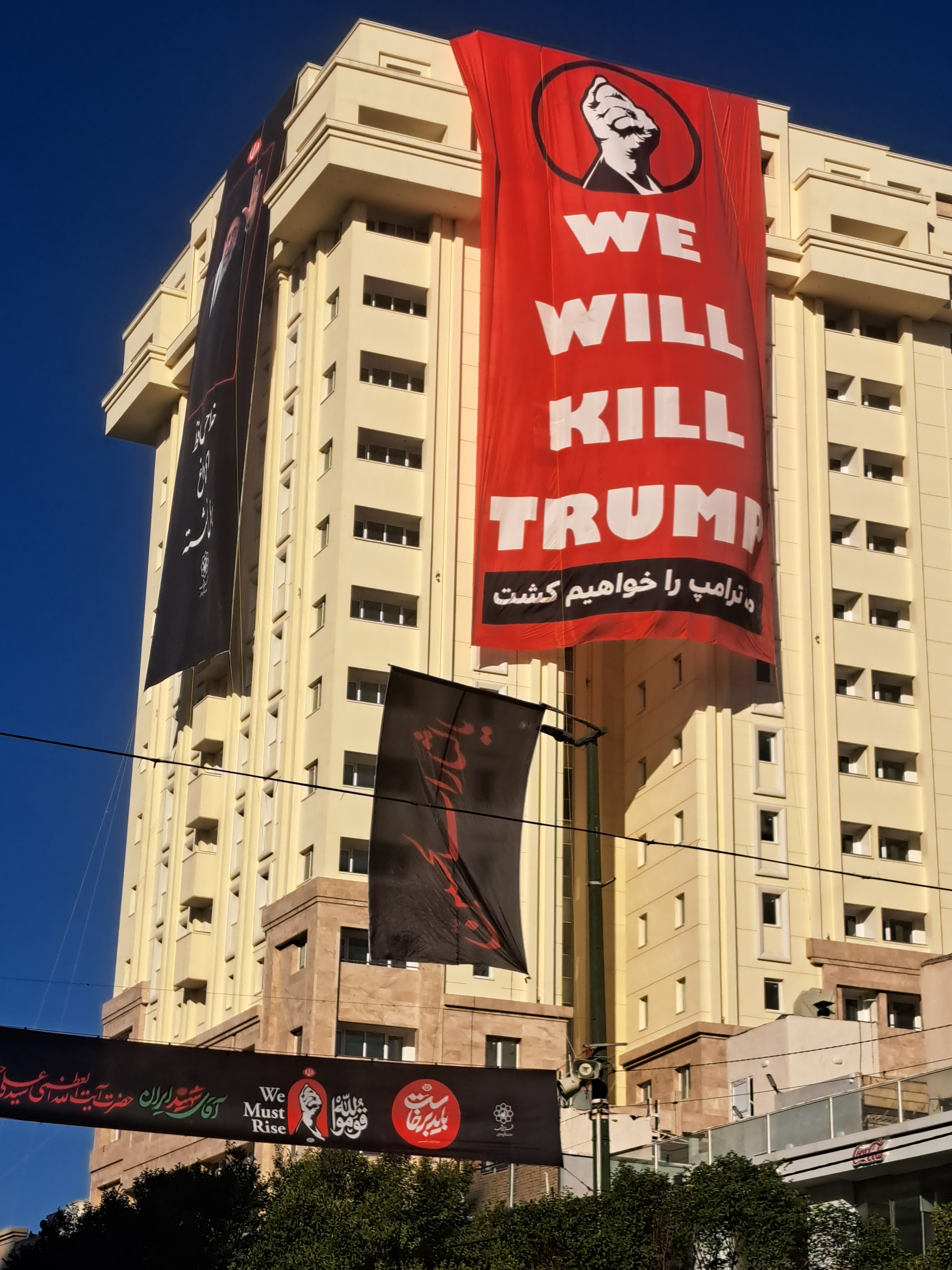
We Will Kill Trump banner on a building in Mashhad, 10 July

=== Legal ===
During the funeral, Iranian MP Amir-Hossein Sabeti introduced legislation to arrange the assassination of US President Donald Trump in revenge to the assassination of former Supreme Leader Ali Khamenei named "Revenge on Trump Bill". In 2025, Iran had put in place a $40 million USD bounty on Trump's head, a few weeks after the Twelve-Day War ended.

=== Foreign ===
Pakistani PM Shehbaz Sharif called Khamenei "great scholar to be remembered by millions."

A 10-dinar memorial postage stamp was announced in Iraq.

US President Donald Trump said the US could have "one shotted" killing regime officials attending the funeral, but doing so would have left no one to negotiate with, and that he was surprised to see Iranians crying at the funeral of Khamenei, stating that he had expected people to hate him, claiming that "maybe they are fake tears." He stated they have given Iran one week's time for the funeral and paused U.S.-Iran negotiations because they are not "bad people" and also as the Iranian regime is allegedly 'dying' to settle.

Israeli Defence Minister Israel Katz stated that Khamenei's funeral procession is taking place because, after threatening Israel's existence, he was "eliminated by Israel," adding that "the annihilator was annihilated." Katz warned that any future Iranian leaders who threaten Israel would also be dealt with. He criticized the chants against Trump, calling them "disgraceful" and reflecting the true character of the Iranian regime. Prime Minister Benjamin Netanyahu reacted to the funeral ceremony in Iran by saying: "Khamenei would be still in power had it not been for them and Iran's regime is standing because it has a few hundred thousand goons who kill, murder in broad daylight, and at night they murder their own people" and "Attacking Iran is like removing cancer from your body. If you don't remove the cancer, you'll die."

Former U.S. Secretary of State Mike Pompeo wrote on X that "the Iranian regime intentionally chose July 4 for the late Ayatollah's funeral, to show their hatred for everything America stands for."

=== Domestic ===
Senior IRGC advisor General Hamidreza Moghaddamfar said "there will not be peace between Islamic Republic and America" and called for retaliation "eye for an eye" as a historic necessity. Iranian President Masoud Pezeshkian said he did not say goodbye to Khamenei and that he "lives forever."

Iranian Parliament Speaker Mohammad Bagher Ghalibaf called for vengeance for blood of the former Supreme Leader and the liberation of Jerusalem.

During the second day of the farewell and funeral prayer ceremonies for the late leader, officials, commanders, and other participants told media outlets that preserving his ideological and political legacy was essential, stressing that the country's future should remain aligned with his teachings, statements, and guiding principles. On the sidelines of the ceremony, Masoud Pezeshkian said in an interview that he would continue the path of the late leader, adding: "I promise to continue the way of the martyred Imam." Amir Siari, Chief of Staff and Deputy Coordinator of the Iranian Army, stated that "we will continue to pursue the ideals of the Supreme Leader to the last drop of blood."

Following the funeral processions in Iraq on 8 July 2026, Iranian Foreign Minister Abbas Araghchi thanked the Iraqi government, people, and religious authorities for their role in hosting Khamenei’s funeral ceremonies. In a post on X, he expressed appreciation for Iraq’s hospitality and cooperation during the ceremonies.

=== Non-state actors ===
During the Tehran funeral ceremonies, Jawad Nasrallah, the son of former Hezbollah secretary-general Hassan Nasrallah, gave an interview to the Houthi-owned Al-Masirah website and said that the deaths of Ali Khamenei and his father had deepened feelings of revenge among supporters of the resistance movement. He also described the relationship between his father and Khamenei as a spiritual bond.

Yasser Mousavi, the son of former Hezbollah secretary-general Abbas al-Musawi, described Khamenei's funeral procession as a "global referendum" in an interview with the Iraqi Al-Ahed channel, He referred to Khamenei as a "father of the oppressed".

Al-Masirah said "A farewell that brought nations together... Delegations from 100 countries attended his ceremony."

Mohammed al-Bukhaiti, a spokesman for Yemen’s Houthis, said that the United States and Israel were responsible for Khamenei’s death, alleging that he was targeted because of his support for the liberation of Palestine. He described Khamenei as a symbol of resistance and freedom for nations seeking independence from US and Israeli influence.

Ibrahim al-Dailami, Yemen's ambassador to Iran, said in an interview with Al-Masirah that the unprecedented funeral procession for Ali Khamenei reflected the unity and resilience of the Iranian people. He said that the Iranian people and leadership had united "martyrdom and victory" in an exceptional display. He added that the funeral strengthened the unity of the resistance fronts and said that the fronts of jihad and resistance would strengthen their ties and reshape political alignments.

Nigerian Shia leader Ibrahim Zakzaky said in a message that the blood of Khamenei would bring down the Zionist regime. He described Khamenei as the successor to Ruhollah Khomeini and praised his leadership, courage, and commitment to the Islamic Revolution. Zakzaky also said that Mojtaba Khamenei would continue this path.

Ahmad al-Hamidawi, secretary-general of Kata'ib Hezbollah, said that the participation of millions of mourners in Ali Khamenei's funeral processions in Najaf and Karbala demonstrated support for the "Axis of Resistance," describing it as a "decisive popular referendum." He said that the group would remain committed to Khamenei's path and pledged allegiance to his successor. Hamidawi also called on Iraqi political leaders and government officials to respect what he described as the will of the Iraqi people and warned them against aligning with foreign agendas.

Former crown prince of the Pahlavi dynasty of Iran Reza Pahlavi stated that regardless of diplomats' decisions the Islamic Republic regime would fall and "Iran is mourning more than 40,000 sons and daughters slaughtered on January 8 and 9 by Khamenei, Ghalibaf, and their machinery of repression".

=== Media coverage ===
==== Local ====
Hard-line Iranian newspaper Kayhan called for the beheading of Donald Trump.

==== International ====
The Associated Press reported that hundreds of thousands of mourners attended the opening of the funeral ceremonies in Tehran, describing the event as a large-scale state funeral marked by mass participation, heavy security, and public expressions of grief.

The Wall Street Journal described the funeral as a major demonstration of political defiance toward the United States and Israel, reporting that Iranian authorities expected millions of participants.

France 24 reported that 15 million people were expected to attend, while The Guardian reported millions had participated.

Iran issued special visas and flew in 400 foreigner influencers to the funeral including Bushra Shaikh, Calla Walsh, and American political activist Jackson Hinkle. The BBC struck a deal with the Iranian regime allowing it to provide coverage of the processions on the condition that it would not be broadcast on BBC Persian. Iranian officials told The New York Times that Supreme Leader Mojtaba Khamenei was barred from attending, as they feared Israel could assassinate him during the funeral or track him afterwards, revealing his place of hiding.

BBC Persian reported the country is divided as people called Khamenei's family funeral "the end of the great murderer of Iran".

The refrigerated truck carrying Khamenei's body in Karbala drew attention in Finland as the vehicle had the branding of one of countries largest retailers, Kesko. The owner of Kesko told media that one of its transport partners had sold the truck abroad without removing the branding.

== Analysis ==
Palestinian analyst Abdel Bari Atwan called attacks on Iran during the funeral a morally low point for the US President. CNN reported that the state funeral of Ali Khamenei was a calculated geopolitical and ideological spectacle engineered to immortalize him as a symbol of resilience while projecting the Islamic Republic's defiance to the international community. The scale of the event aimed to demonstrate that the leadership had not only survived an existential conflict but remained a potent, borderless revolutionary force. By excluding Western officials from the invitation list, Iran emphasized its firm stance against Western policies, with officials characterizing the positions of European nations as being on the "wrong side of history".

It coincided with the Islamic month of Muharram, invoking the historic martyrdom of Husayn ibn Ali, to whom Khamenei traced his lineage, in resistance against tyranny. This narrative framed Khamenei's death as a vindication of his worldview, elevating his legacy to that of a martyred religious authority. Through state-coordinated media coverage, this imagery is used to unite the public against "oppression and arrogance", with officials declaring that the nation will not remain silent regarding the "blood of its Imam". Ultimately, by aligning the funeral with the 250th American Independence Day and highlighting the personal cost of the conflict through the display of family members' coffins, the organizers sought to solidify a legacy of martyrdom and unyielding resistance against the West.

The New Arab reported that Iran's funeral ceremony for Supreme Leader Ali Khamenei was used as a subtle diplomatic stage, with different Quranic verses recited for visiting delegations in ways that appeared to reflect each country's relationship with Tehran. Saudi Arabia was associated with a verse about opposing armies, suggesting rivalry; Qatar with a verse tied to divine favor and mediation, matching its intermediary role; Lebanon with a verse about obedience and authority, hinting at tensions over Hezbollah and state power; and Russia with a verse about humility and restraint. Overall, the article argues that the recitations were not just religious ritual but a coded form of foreign-policy messaging about alliances, tensions, and Iran's regional positioning.

== See also ==
- Funeral of Hassan Nasrallah
- List of largest funerals
