= Tabriz International Book Fair =

Annual book fair in Tabriz, Iran

Tabriz International Book Fair (Persian: نمایشگاه بین‌المللی کتاب تبریز) is an annual international book fair held in Tabriz, East Azerbaijan, Iran. Held in Tabriz International Exhibition Center, the event also provides an opportunity for publishers to discuss future cooperation. In terms of number of domestic and foreign publishers contract after than Tehran International Book Fair. Perennial Tabriz International Book Fair visits more than 750,000.

== 13th edition is 2015 ==
Source:

== See also ==
- Media of Iran
- Culture of Iran
- Education in Iran
- Iran International Exhibitions Company
- Intellectual property in Iran
- Tehran International Book Fair
