= Abbas Abad (Tehran) =

Large north-central neighborhood of Tehran, Iran

Abbas Abad Persian: عباس‌آباد
- Neighborhood
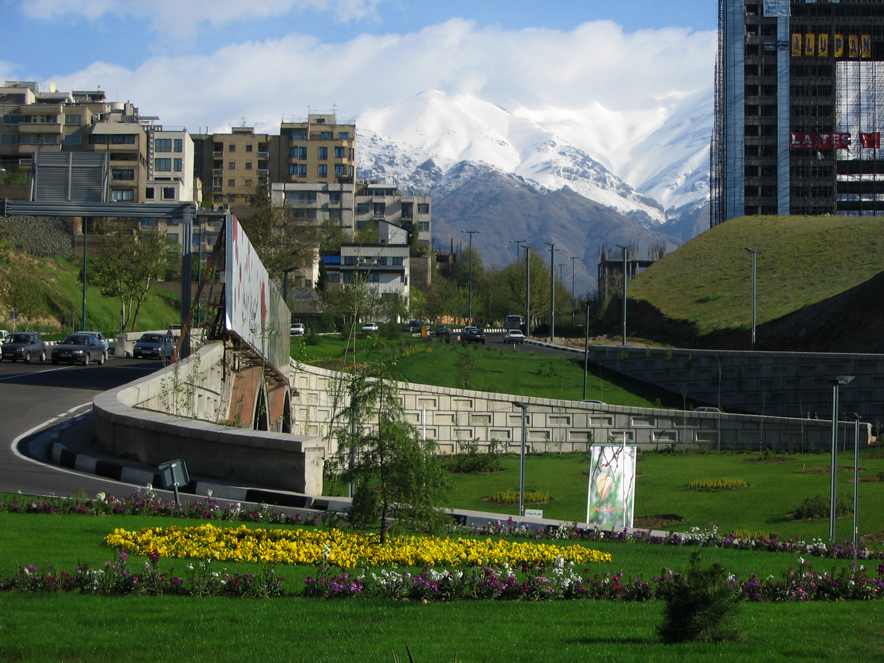
- Roadways in Abbas Abad with Tochal in the foreground

- Location in Tehran
- Coordinates: 35°44′08″N 51°26′08″E
- Country: Iran
- Region: Region 1
- Province: Tehran province
- City: Tehran
- Municipal District: Seventh
- Established: 1950s/1960s
- Time zone: UTC+3:30 (IST)

Abbās Ābād (Persian: عباس‌آباد) is a large north-central neighborhood of Tehran, Iran, designated within the Seventh Municipal District of the capital.

== History ==
Abbas Abad was originally conceived in the 1950s and 60's as a housing and residential center for members of various branches of the military, especially for the ground forces (although on a non-exclusive basis; for instance, in the 1970s the district also became home to a number of Armenian-Iranians). Later on, the district grew and its boundaries blended with other expanding nearby neighborhoods. The capital's first television broadcast stations (both for local and the first-ever trans-national television programming broadcast) were situated on Abbas Abad Hills.

By the early 70's, the district was experiencing exceptional growth, partly due to its location and the availability of land on still-barren Abbas Abad Hills, which eventually became the site for the never-materialized mega project of Shahestan Pahlavi (see Interesting Facts below). To fund further growth, the government in 1971 issued the largest urban development bond-offering to that date, worth approximately $110 million, with 9% annual interest rate and a 7-year maturity. These bonds were initially traded on Tehran Stock Exchange prior to their repurchase at maturity in 1978–79.

=== Urban planning ===
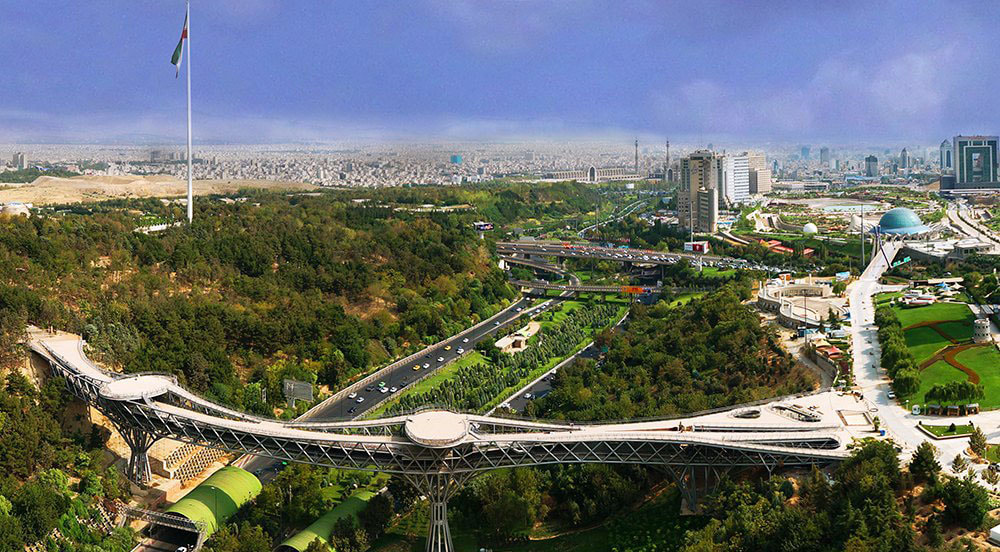
Aerial view of the Tabiat Bridge in 2016

The district's city planning grid was modern and geometric with perpendicular wide avenues (north-south, designated by names) and narrower side streets (east-west, designated by numbers), and most residential plots were subdivided into regular lots of 7 meters wide by 30 meters deep (7x30=210 m^{2}), or 14 meters wide by 30 meters deep (14x30=420 m^{2}, essentially double the size of the smaller, more common lots).

A number of novel and useful practices were used in the residential development of Abbas Abad, which was among the recent districts to be designed anew from the start (some other district were built around and upon older and more established locals, but most of Abbas Abad was built on undeveloped farmland). For example, the apartments on the northern lots of each street were set back to allow for a front-yard, and those on the southern side were to be built adjacent to the street to allow for a backyard, so each building would get the maximum privacy and use of natural sunlight (without much obstructions) while providing the necessary space for the planting of a garden, greenery and/or trees for each house (an essential part of Iranian and Persian architecture). The original building code allowed for the construction of two-family houses (two-floor apartments), although later on (mid- to late 1970s) the code was modified to allow construction of apartment complexes of up to five floors on the larger lots, with strict limits for the location and number of such apartments for each street and avenue.

== Present day development ==
In late 1980s and especially in the 1990s, Abbas Abad saw rapid redevelopment as construction codes were relaxed (similar to most other districts in Tehran) so to raise taxes and fees, allowing for the development of many apartment and even high-rise complexes (mainly due to a 1989 decree that required different parts of the government, including each municipality, to become financially self-sufficient). As such, Abbas Abad moved away from its somewhat uniform residential roots and became a corporate and business hub as well (although overcrowding became a disputed issue). Presently, many domestic and foreign firms are headquartered and have large business operations in the district, partly due to its convenient location as a mid-way point between the more affluent (and more residential) northern Tehran and older business districts to the south (including Grand Bazaar, Tehran), access to multiple intercity highways, and a metro (or subway) station (Mosallā).

=== Mosallā Complex ===
Currently, Iran's largest ceremonial mosque (partly finished, but still under construction) is located in Abbas Abad (Mosallā-e Tehran), and on several occasions, parts of it are used for cultural festivals or fairs as well. For example, for the past few years, the annual Tehran International Book Fair, usually held in May, took place there. This mosque remains mostly closed except for a few annual events.

== Street names ==
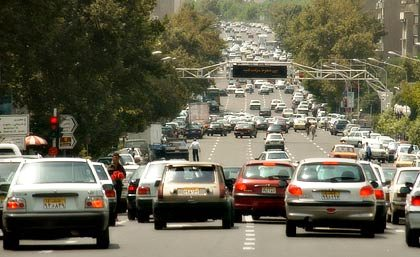
Highway in Abbas Abad

Below are the current and former names of some of the main thoroughfares in Abbas Abad:

- Shahid Beheshti (formerly known as Abbas Abad)
- Ghaem-Magham Farahani (formerly known as Shah Abbas)
- Shahid Saboonchi (formerly known as Mahnaz)
- Khorramshahr (formerly known as Apadana)
- Mirzayeh Shirazi (formerly known as Nader Shah)
- Shahid Mottahari (formerly known as Takhte-Tavous)
- Sohrevardi (formerly known as Farah)
- Shahid Ghandi (formerly known as Paleezi)
- Shahid Arabali (formerly known as Nobakht)
- Howayzeh (formerly known as Takesh)
- Shahid Yusefi (formerly known as Paasha)
- Shahid Zeynali (formerly known as Keyhan)
- Andishe Avenue
- Niloufar Avenue
- Takhti Square

== Interesting facts ==
Given that Abbas Abad was originally developed to house members of the military, some of the district's streets were named after high-ranking officials (retired or serving) of the time who had contributed to the planning and development of Abbas Abad. By the 1970s many of the avenues (running north–south) had names, while most of the streets (running east–west) were numbered.

In the mid-seventies and by the order of the government, a group of renowned planners and architects designed the multibillion-dollar Grand Abbas Abad Development Plan (to be called Shahestan-e Pahlavi — not unlike La Défense in Paris) to house embassies, government ministries, residential and commercial high rises over 550 hectares of open space (the first of its kind in the Middle East and the largest in Asia). The plan, however, never materialized due to a number of issues and events, most notably the Islamic revolution. The sole remnant of that mega-project is Jahan-e Koodak (now Haghani) highway, which was designed to function as its connecting road axis.

Another, more recent project that never materialized was by the Iranian Architect Farshid Moussavi, currently a Professor in Practice at Harvard's Graduate School of Design (Department of Architecture), who was commissioned to design a modern theater complex of 8 large-screen theaters for the district in 1997 (called The "Azadi Cineplex"), but its construction was not approved by the authorities of the Ministry of Culture.

== Diplomatic presence ==
As of 2024, the embassies of Australia, India and Indonesia, are located in Abbas Abad.
