= Ali Akbar Pourjamshidian =

Brigade general of the IRGC Ground Forces

- Native name: علی‌اکبر پورجمشیدیان
- Born: 1962 (age 63–64)

Ali Akbar Pourjamshidian (born 1962) is a brigadier general of the Islamic Revolutionary Guard Corps (IRGC ) who has been the Security and Law Enforcement Deputy of the Minister of Interior since October 2024. He also serves as the commander of the Hamzeh Seyed al-Shohada Base. Since 2016, he has been the Coordinating Deputy of the IRGC Ground Forces, and prior to that, he was the Deputy of Operations for this force. Pourjamshidian has a history of commanding the Ashura Corps of East Azerbaijan and participating in the Iran-Iraq War.

On September 30, 2024, he was appointed as the secretary of the National Security Council of Iran.

== Career ==
Pourjamshidian was among the senior IRGC commanders who were called to Syria as the battle for Aleppo became prolonged and difficult. When he was deployed to the Syrian war, he was the Deputy of Operations for the IRGC Ground Forces and operationally commanded many of the IRGC's divisions and combat brigades. In practice, he was responsible for operational planning at the highest level of the IRGC. In October 2016, by order of Mohammad Ali Jafari, the Commander-in-Chief of the Islamic Revolutionary Guard Corps, he replaced Abolghasem Foroutan as the Coordinating Deputy of the IRGC Ground Forces.

The U.S. Treasury Department has imposed sanctions on Pourjamshidian and more than ten senior Iranian officials and corporate entities who, it says, are connected to the "violent suppression" in Iran against the protests following the death of Mahsa Amini, as well as responsible for restrictions on internet access.

On 16 March 2026, the European union imposed sanctions on a large number of iranian officials, including Pourjamshidian.
