= Tehran International Book Fair =

Book fair in Tehran, Iran

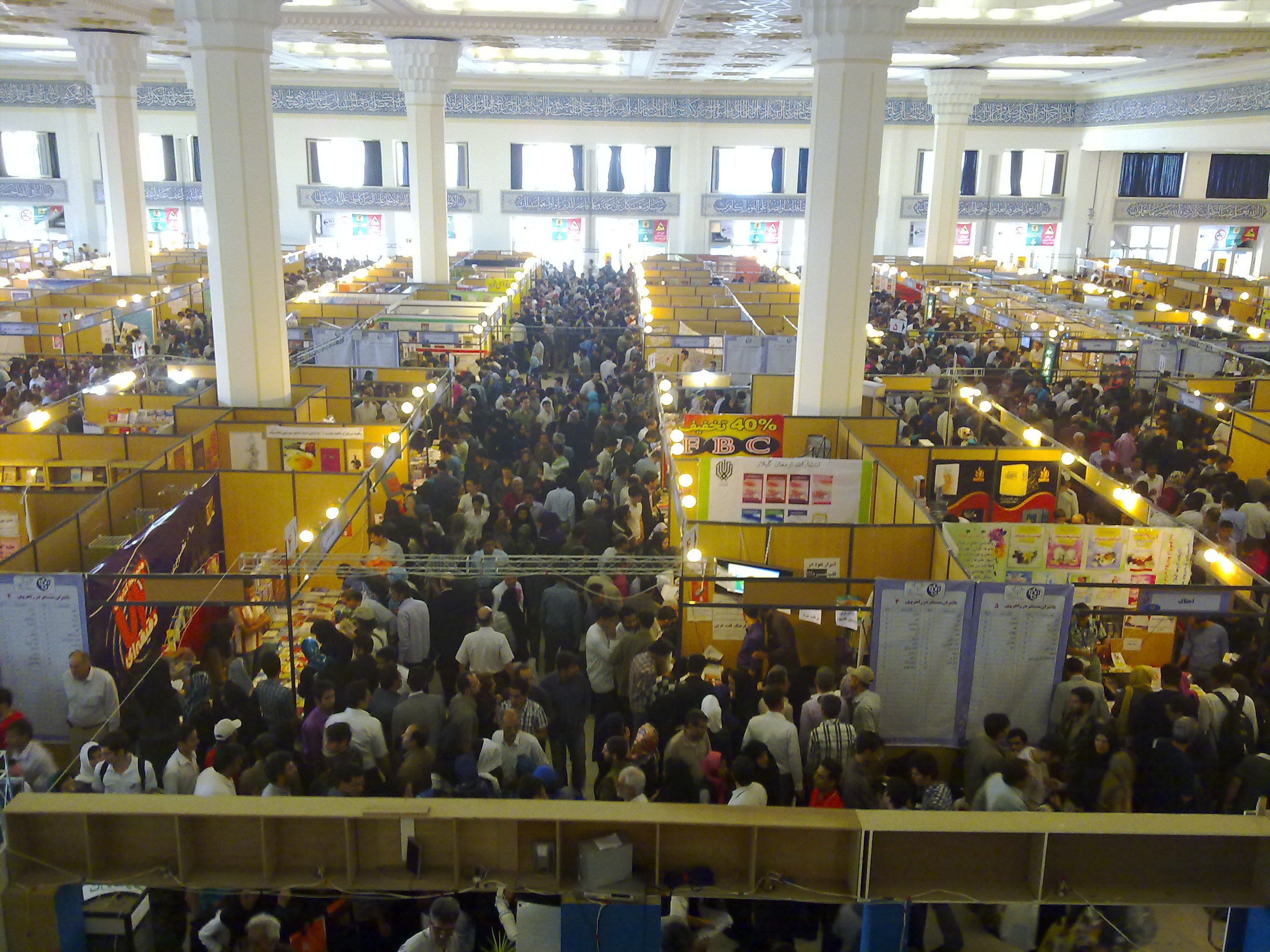
Main Hall for General books on the premises of the Iranian capital's Mosallā-e Tehran site

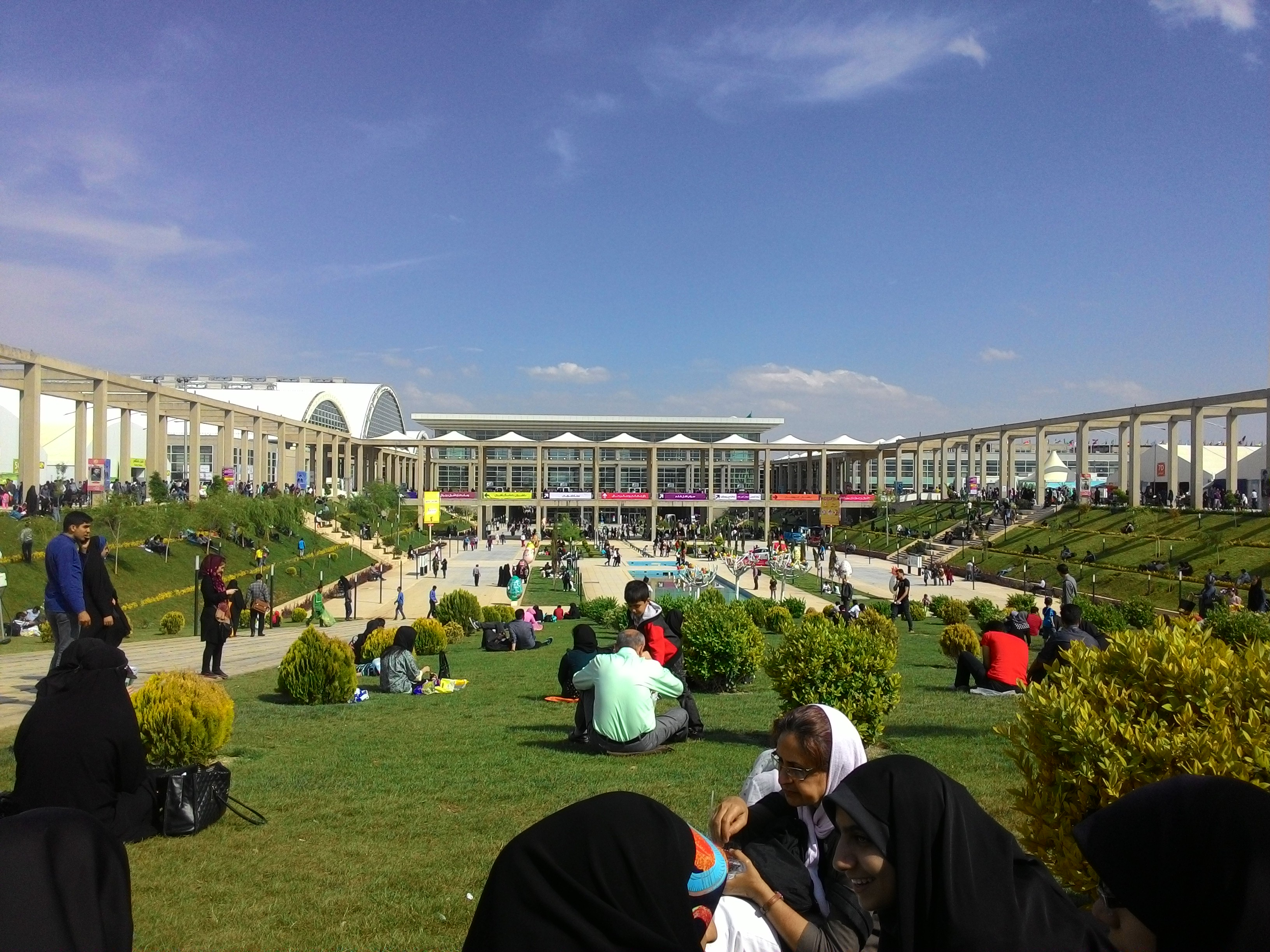
29th Tehran International Book Fair

Tehran International Book Fair (Persian: نمایشگاه بین‌المللی کتاب تهران) is an annual international book fair held in Tehran, Iran. The event is held in a 120,000 square meter venue at Tehran's Grand Prayer Grounds.

While this event showcases products like humanities, religion, philosophy, literature, social sciences, art and architecture, pure and applied science based books associated with this field etc., the Tehran Book Fair has been criticized by the Anti-Defamation League for its antisemitic and Holocaust denial literature, which notably featured the Russian forgery text of The Protocols of the Elders of Zion and books by white supremacist David Duke. The fair has also been criticized for censoring and banning books by the exiled opposition group the People's Mojahedin of Iran.

== See also ==
- Media of Iran
- Culture of Iran
- Education in Iran
- Propaganda in Iran
- Censorship in Iran
- Antisemitism in Iran
- Human rights in Iran
- Iran International Exhibitions Company
- Intellectual property in Iran
- Tabriz International Book Fair
