= Death and state funeral of Akbar Hashemi Rafsanjani =

Death and funeral of Iran's fourth president

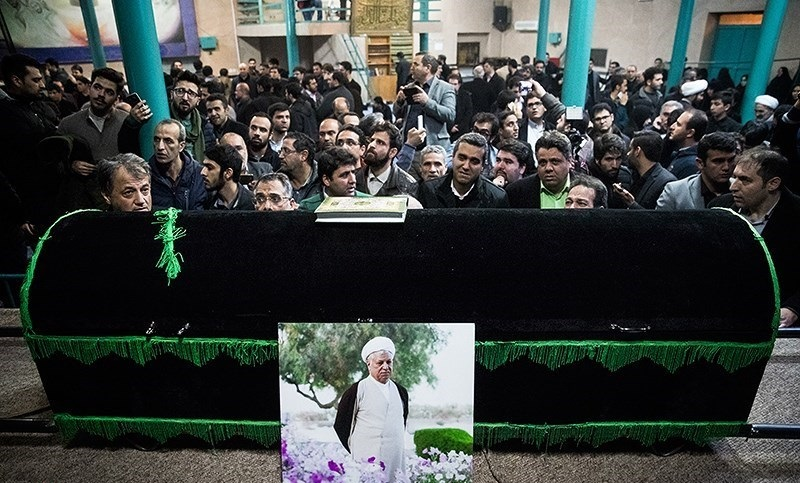
- Rafsanjani's body showing to the public in Jamaran Huseinieh, with a picture of him in center.
- Date: 9–11 January 2017
- Location: Jamaran, Tehran, Iran (Public viewing) Tehran University (State funeral) Mausoleum of Ruhollah Khomeini (Burial) Imam Khomeini Huseinieh (Memorial service)
- Website: hashemirafsanjani.ir

On 8 January 2017, Akbar Hashemi Rafsanjani, the fourth President of Iran and the country's Chairman of Expediency Discernment Council, died at the age of 82 after suffering a heart attack. He was transferred unconscious to a hospital in Tajrish, north Tehran. Attempts at cardiopulmonary resuscitation for more than an hour trying to revive him were unsuccessful and he died at 19:30 local time (UTC+3:30).

Iranian government observed a national mourning period of 3 days. Rafsanjani's body lay in state at Jamaran Huseinieh, near where his house was located. Thousands of the people and officials from Iran and other countries visited his body at Jamaran. A state funeral was held on 10 January 2017 which was attended by millions of people and his body was buried at the Mausoleum of Ruhollah Khomeini hours later.

== Funeral events ==
=== Lying in state ===
Rafsanjani's body lay in state at the Jamaran Huseinieh in north Tehran hours after his death from 9 to 10 January 2017. Approximately thousands mourners viewed his body over the two days. The crowds grew larger each day and thousands who queued on the final day could not be accommodated and were turned away. The ceremony was also attended by Rafsanjani's family, Iranian officials like President Hassan Rouhani and his cabinet, parliament members and its chairman Ali Larijani, Tehran Friday prayer Imam Mohammed Emami-Kashani, Chief of Staff for the Armed Forces Major General Mohammad Bagheri and Quds Forces commander Major General Qasem Soleimani, Ruhollah Khomeini's survivors (specially Hassan Khomeini), former parliament chairman and a close friend Ali Akbar Nateq-Nouri, former MP and presidential election rival Ahmad Tavakoli, former government members (Akbar Torkan, Mohsen Rafighdoost, Ahmad Madani, Abdullah Nouri, Manouchehr Mottaki etc.), public figures like cinema director Ebrahim Hatamikia, former national team and Persepolis head coach Ali Parvin, singer Majid Akhshabi and some foreign figures which included Iraqis Ibrahim al-Jafari and Ammar al-Hakim, as well as Iraq's ambassadors to Iran.

=== Place of burial ===
Hours after his death, his office announced that a state funeral would be held on 11 January in University of Tehran, with the place of burial being Mausoleum of Ruhollah Khomeini. It was previously announced he would be buried at Fatima Masumeh Shrine in Qom, but his family decided to change the place of burial.

=== State funeral ===
Thousands of the people and government officials attended the ceremony and Ali Khamenei performed the ritual prayer for the deceased (Salat al-Mayyit) in his funeral. Some foreign leaders like Afghanistan's Chief Executive Abdullah Abdullah, Kuwait's Deputy Prime Minister Sabah Al-Khalid Al-Sabah, Turkeministan Deputy Prime Minister Raşit Meredow, Iraqi foreign minister Ibrahim al-Jaafari, Georgian foreign minister Mikheil Janelidze, Azerbaijan parliament chair Ogtay Asadov, Malian national assembly president Issaka Sidibé, British Ambassador Nicholas Hopton, Lebanon's Nabih Berri and Armenian parliament speaker Galust Sahakyan also attended the event. The truck carrying Rafsanjani's coffin topped with his trademark white turban inched down Enqelab Street, one of the capital's main thoroughfares. Rafsanjani was buried next to the former supreme leader Ruhollah Khomeini.

There have been mentioned diverse statistics concerning the present population in the funeral, and it is estimated from 330,000 to 2,500,000. According to BBC: "Tens of thousands of Iranians attended the funeral of the former president, Akbar Hashemi Rafsanjan"; also, according to Iranian TV and governor of Tehran, 2.5 million attended his funeral. It is also can be named as the third largest funeral in Iran; namely after Seyyed Ruhollah Khomeini's funeral who was estimated 10 (to 17) million participants, and Qasem Soleimani's funeral with 7 million in Tehran as well as other cities.

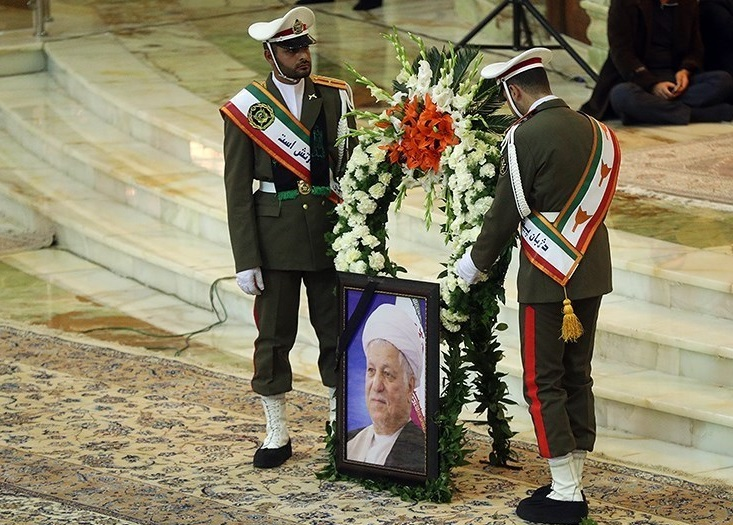
Iranian Army's starch guard paying tribute to Rafsanjani.

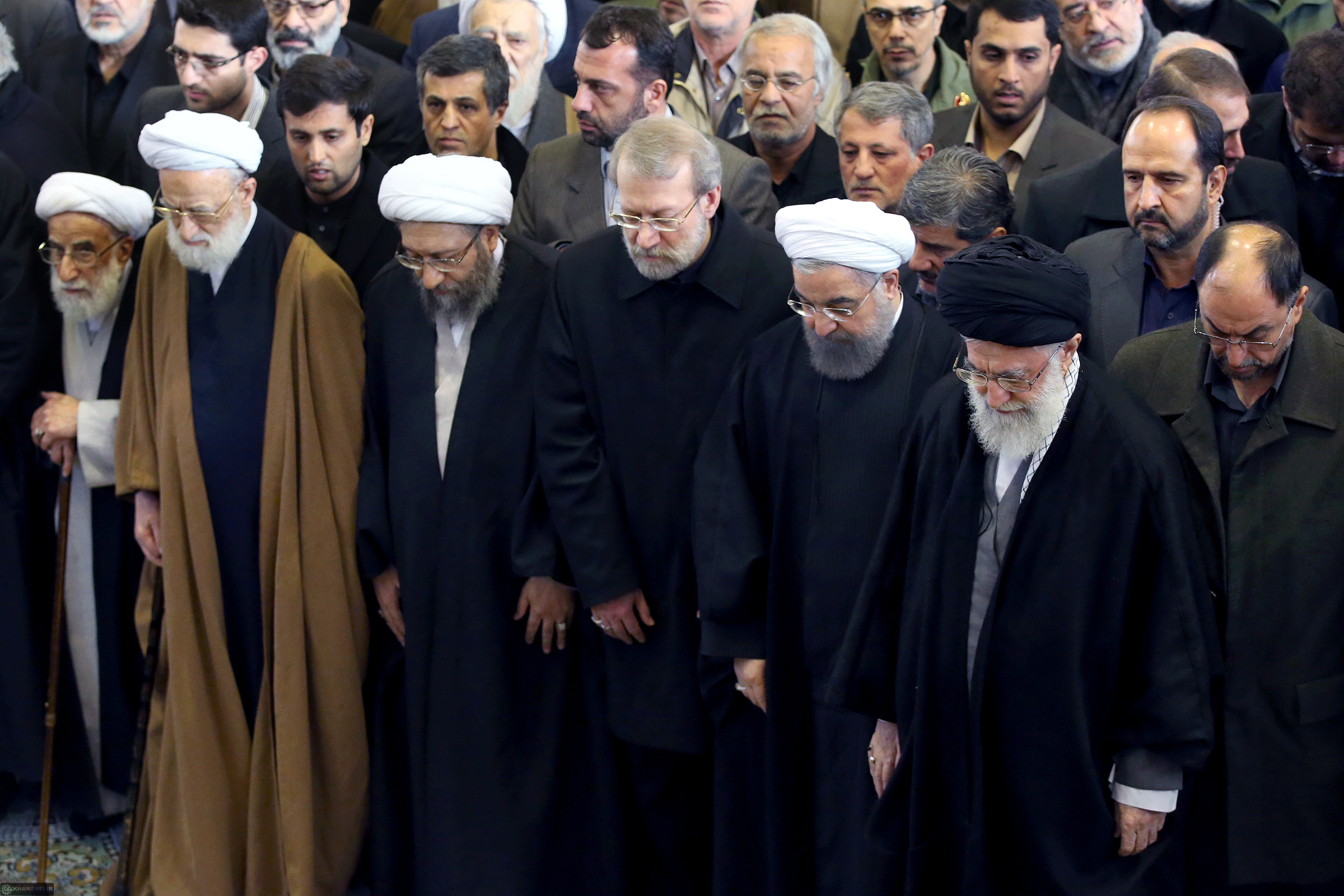
Iranian officials at the ceremony.

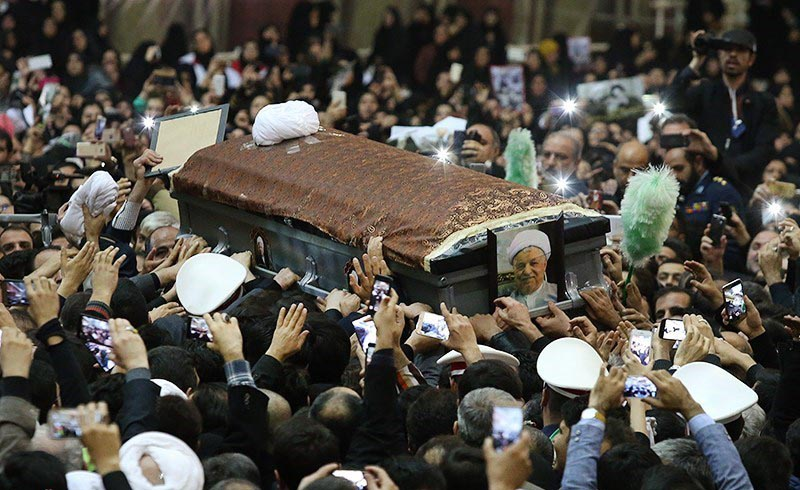
Rafsanjani's body at Mausoleum of Ruhollah Khomeini.

== Memorial services ==
=== Iran ===
The Office of the Supreme Leader of Iran announced that a memorial service will be held in Beit Rahbari by Ayatollah Ali Khamenei on 11 January in memorial of Hashemi Rafsanjani. It was attended by the survivors of Rafsanjani and governmental and foreign officials. Another memorial service was also held on the same day by the Rafsanjani family in the mosque of Azad University central building. Another ceremonies was held in different cities like Qom and Rafsanjani on 12 and 13 January. A ceremony was also held at Imam Reza Shrine The 7th Day (Haftom) ceremony was also held at Mausoleum of Ruhollah Khomeini on 15 January which crowds of the people attending.

=== Foreign states ===
Memorial services was held by Iran's embassy at Baghdad, Kabul, London, Beirut, Tokyo, Ankara and other cities.

A memorial service in honour of Rafsanjani was held on 14 January 2017 in Najaf's Imam Ali shrine which was attended by key Shiite clerics.

== Reactions ==
=== Iran ===
==== Persons ====
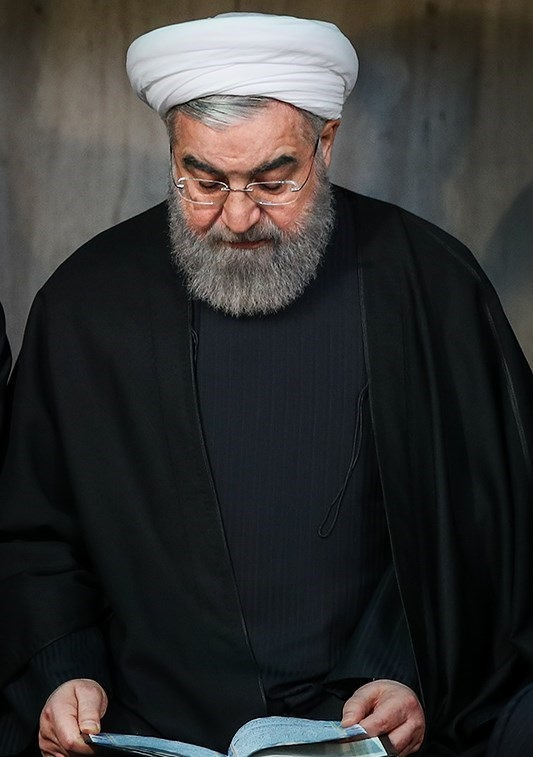
President Rouhani prays for Rafsanjani by reading Quran, Jamaran

- Ayatollah Ali Khamenei, Supreme Leader of Iran called Rafsanjani an "old friend and comrade" and said his loss is "difficult and life-decreasing." He hailed a "companion of struggle" despite their differences. He noted that Rafsanjani's loss was overwhelming and very hard to bear, adding that their cooperation and friendship had lasted for 59 years. However, during a speech on the day of Rafsanjani's death, using a play on Rafsanjani's first name Akbar, Khamenei stated that it would cause harm to the Islamic Republic if a “reprobate or misled brother” turned out to be the “bigger Satan” and played the role of the real Satan in misleading the people", further stating that "this person is our enemy, too". In the traditional prayer for the dead, Khamenei also noticeably omitted the sentence attesting that the deceased lived a life of "benevolence and goodness".
- President Hassan Rouhani praised Rafsanjani as a great man of the Islamic Revolution. "The soul of the great man of the revolution, symbol of patience and resistance, has gone to Heaven", saying Rouhani on his Twitter.
- At the start of a parliament session on the next day after Rafsanjani's death, parliament speaker Ali Larijani paid tribute to the late leader, describing Rafsanjani as "a man for hard days whose name has been always been tied to the revolution and it will always be so."
- Chairman of the Assembly of Experts Ayatollah Ahmad Jannati, Foreign Minister Mohammad Javad Zarif, Iran's Judiciary chief Ayatollah Sadeq Larijani, Secretary of Iran's Supreme National Security Council Ali Shamkhani, former presidents Mohammad Khatami and Mahmoud Ahmadinejad, Mohammad-Taqi Mesbah-Yazdi, Mahmoud Hashemi Shahroudi, Gholam-Ali Haddad-Adel, Mohsen Rezaee, Ali Akbar Velayati, Mohammad Reza Bahonar, Kamal Kharazi, Ali Movahedi-Kermani, Mohammad Yazdi, Yahya Rahim Safavi, Valiollah Seif and many more also expressed their condolences.
- Commanders of Iranian Army and Islamic Revolutionary Guard Corps also expressed their condolences for Rafsanjani's death.
- Opposition leader, Mir-Hossein Mousavi said "Understanding of the revolution without his impact is impossible."
- Zahra Mostafavi Khomeini, daughter of Ruhollah Khomeini said that Hashemi's death was "bitter than poison for me".
- Sadegh Zibakalam, a Tehran university professor and prominent reformist also described Rafsanjani as "patiently stood against extremism", and said he will remember in history as a hero like Amir Kabir [Iranian reformist chancellor slain in 1851] and Mohammad Mosaddegh".

==== Political parties ====
His death is described as a "blow" to the reformist movement of Iran. He headed the Expediency Council, a body which is intended to resolve disputes between the parliament and a hardline watchdog body, the Guardian Council.

- Combatant Clergy Association, a party that Rafsanjani was a member of it but abandoned his activities since 2009, issued a statement and praised Hashemi's role in the Islamic Revolution of Iran and describes his role as "unforgettable".
- Executives of Construction Party published a statement on their website, describes loss of Hashemi Rafsanjani—a spiritual leader of them—as a "big disaster" for people of Iran and those who are interested in the way of developing prosperity and freedom in Iran.
- Moderation and Development Party, the ruling party that Hashemi's daughter (Fatemeh) is one of its central committee members issued a statement and describes Hashemi as "Father of the Moderation". The party also stated that "We are confident that his way will be continued by the lovers of the moderation and those who welfare of the people are important for them", saying party's spokesperson.
- Pro-reformists NEDA Party describes Hashemi's death as a shock news which grieved Iranians.
- Principlist Islamic Coalition Party condolences the death of Hashemi Rafsanjani and said in their statement that Hashemi was a great opposition of Shah's capitulation and was a helper of Amani, Bokharayi, Niknejhad and Harandi (founders of the party who executed by Shah regime). Asadollah Badamchian, a high-ranking member of the party said in a TV show that Rafsanjani has helped a group of ICP in the assassination of then-prime minister Hassan Ali Mansur. The claim was rejected by Rafsanjani's office.
- Newly formed Union of Islamic Iran People Party stated Hashemi's death are worried them at "a time that we needs continuity of his role in politics and strengthen the authority of moderation and hope", both domestically and internationally.
- Islamic Labour Party and its trade union Worker House issued a statement and describes Hashemi as "Great superman of history" and "Amir Kabir of the time". The party also said that Hashemi was a great supporter of workers and construction.
- Freedom Movement, an opponent of Rafsanjani during his presidency, published a condolence message. The party said in their message that Hashemi role in various fields, especially in recent years will not be erased from historical memory of the Iranian people and his absence will be felt in the political and social arena. The party also said "It's very difficult to judge the men of the actions [politics]".

==== Other commentators ====
- Top Shiite cleric, Grand Ayatollah Ali Sistani, also extended his condolences to Iran over the demise of Hashemi Rafsanjani. Separate message was also sent by religious leaders like Grand Ayatollahs Nasser Makarem Shirazi, Hossein Vahid Khorasani, Hossein Noori Hamedani, Lotfollah Safi Golpaygani, Abdollah Javadi-Amoli, Yousef Saanei, Jafar Sobhani and others. Society of Seminary Teachers of Qom and Qom Seminary also announced memorial ceremonies in honour of Hashemi.
- Iranian newspapers across the political spectrum are paying tribute to Rafsanjani. Most front pages are splashed with pictures and captions highlighting his central role in Iranian politics. Many have used black as a background. "Iran mourns the death of contemporary Amir Kabir," moderate Arman-e Emruz announces, comparing Rafsanjani to the man widely considered to be Iran's first reformer and moderniser. An "irretrievable loss", moderate daily Iran laments, while reformist Aftab-e Yazd, under a picture of Rafsanjani's grieving children, affirms that "Iran is mourning". Even hard-line dailies are joining in the accolades. Javan notes his closeness to the founder of the Islamic republic, Ayatollah Ruhollah Khomeini, and Supreme Leader Ali Khamenei in its headline: "Man of tough days of fighting and friend of Imam and the Leader rushes to meet God." Hard-line Vatan-e-Emrooz describes him as "one of the pillars" and "a genuine figure" of Iran's Islamic Revolution.

=== International ===
==== Governments ====
===== Africa =====
- Algeria – President Abdelaziz Bouteflika expressed condolences over the demise of Iran's Expediency Council chief Ayatollah Hashemi Rafsanjani. In a message to his Iranian counterpart Hassan Rouhani, Bouteflika said the late Ayatollah played a crucial role in enhancing solidarity within the Islamic Ummah. He said history will stand witness to the bold and distinguished part he played in elevating the Islamic solidarity.
- Ethiopia – President Mulatu Teshome in a message to his Iranian counterpart Hassan Rouhani condoled the Iranian people and government on the demise of Ayatollah Akbar Hashemi Rafsanjani. In his message, Teshome expressed grief over the death of the late ayatollah and appreciated Hashemi for his effective role in the establishment of regional security.
- Ivory Coast – President of the Ivory Coast Alassane Ouattara condoled with President Rouhani on the death of the Expediency Council chief.
- Mauritania – President Mohamed Ould Abdel Aziz sent a condolence message to President Rouhani. Ruling party Union for the Republic also sent a condolence message.
- Senegal – President Macky Sall expressed deep sorrow and condolences to the Iranian president and nation over demise of the Ayatollah.
- South Africa – President Jacob Zuma issued a statement saying his nation "acknowledges President Rafsanjani's pioneering spirit in establishing stronger trade and political ties with African countries and South Africa."
- Zimbabwe – Vice President Phelekezela Mphoko voiced condolences over the demise of the Iranian Expediency Council Chairman Ayatollah Akbar Hashemi Rafsanjani to the Iranian government and nation. Rafsanjani. He signed a memorial book in Iran's embassy in Harare, capital of Zimbabwe, and paid homage to the late Ayatollah.

===== Asia =====
- (Islamic Republic of Afghanistan) Afghanistan – President Ashraf Ghani and the country's Chief Executive Abdullah Abdullah sent separate messages to the Iranian President Hassan Rouhani and expressed their sadness caused by the news. President Ghani said that Hashemi Rafsanjani, highly revered by his supporters, had played an influential role, during his presidency and in other positions, in numerous regional issues. On behalf of the people and the Government of Afghanistan, President Ashraf Ghani extends his deep condolences to his family, the Supreme Leader, the President, government and people of Iran.
- Armenia – President Serzh Sargsyan in a Twitter message condoled President Hassan Rouhani on the demise of the late Chairman of the Expediency Council Ayatollah Ali Akbar Hashemi Rafsanjani. He said Rafsanjani will be remembered by the Armenian people as a President of the neighboring country whose tenure in office was represented by the establishment of the initial interstate relations between the newly independent Armenia and Iran, which gave a new impetus to the centuries-long friendship of our two nations. "Based on the strong foundation, which was formed in those years, today we continue to expand and deepen our cooperation", said Sargsyan. Armenian Prime Minister Karen Karapetyan also condoled the Iranian ambassador to Armenia on the departure of Ayatollah Rafsanjani.
- Azerbaijan – President Ilham Aliyev offered condolences over the death of former Iranian president Ayatollah Ali Akbar Hashemi Rafsanjani to the Supreme Leader of the Islamic Republic of Iran Ayatollah Ali Khamenei. "I was deeply saddened by the news of the death of Ayatollah Ali Akbar Hashemi Rafsanjani, former president of the Islamic Republic of Iran, outstanding statesman, public and political figure," said President Aliyev in his letter of condolence. "Being the example of loyalty to his state and people through all his activities and way of life, Ayatollah Ali Akbar Hashemi Rafsanjani was also known as a wise and far-sighted politician. Ayatollah Ali Akbar Hashemi Rafsanjani made a significant contribution to the formation and the expansion of relations between the Islamic Republic of Iran and the Republic of Azerbaijan," he noted. President Aliyev also offered condolences to President of Iran Hassan Rouhani.
- Bahrain– King Hamad bin Isa Al Khalifa sent a condolence message to Iran saying that he was "praying to almighty God for his soul to rest in peace and inspire Iran's president, its people and his family." Bahraini Foreign Minister, Khalid bin Ahmed Al Khalifa, whose country has tense relations with Iran, voiced condolences on Twitter over Rafsanjani's death, as well.
- China – Foreign Minister Wang Yi sent a condolence message to his Iranian counterpart, Mohammad Javad Zarif, over the death of former Iranian President Akbar Hashemi Rafsanjani. The Chinese Foreign Ministry also published a statement and called Rafsanjani an "influential leader". Foreign Ministry spokesperson Lu Kang said that China extended its sympathy to the government and people of Iran, as well as Rafsanjani's relatives. Lu also spoke highly of Rafsanjani's contributions to bilateral ties between Iran and China during his presidency.
- Iraq – President Fuad Masum and Prime Minister Haider al-Abadi offered their condolences, while voicing their appreciation for Ayatollah Rafsanjani's efforts backing the people of Iraq. Former prime minister and current Vice President Nouri al-Maliki and Chairman of Iraqi National Coalition Ammar al-Hakim also sent condolence messages.
  - (Kurdistan Region) Iraqi Kurdistan – President Massoud Barzani sent messages of condolences to Supreme Leader of the Islamic Revolution Ayatollah Ali Khamenei and President Hassan Rouhani on the passing of Ayatollah Akbar Hashemi Rafsanjani. In his messages, Barzani expressed condolences on behalf of his nation to the Iranian people and government on the departure of the late Ayatollah. He also prayed for the peace of the soul of the deceased Ayatollah. Parliament Speaker Yousif Muhammed Sadiq also sent a message.
- India – Prime Minister Narendra Modi issued a message of condolence on the occasion of Ayatollah Hashemi Rafsanjani's demise. He prayed to almighty God for his soul to rest in peace and inspire Iran's president, its people and his family.
- Indonesia – President Joko Widodo said efforts made by Ayatollah Rafsanjani will remain in minds forever. He said that Ayatollah Rafsanjani's passing would be a great loss for the Iranian nation. Widodo condoled with the Iranian nation and the bereaved family of Ayatollah Rafsanjani on behalf of Indonesian nation.
- Japan – Prime Minister Shinzō Abe and Foreign Minister Fumio Kishida in separate messages extended condolences on the demise of Ayatollah Akbar Hashemi Rafsanjani. Abe in his message expressed sympathy on the sad occasion and hailed the achievements of the late chairman of the Expediency Council.
- Jordan – King Abdullah II sent a condolence message.
- Kazakhstan – Kazakh President Nursultan Nazarbayev in a message to his Iranian counterpart Hassan Rouhani condoled him and Ayatollah Khamenei on demise of Ayatollah Akbar Hashemi Rafsanjani.
- Kuwait – Emir Sabah Al-Ahmad Al-Jaber Al-Sabah, sent condolences over Rafsanjani's death, saying he "prayed to Allah the almighty to bestow blessings on the deceased."
- Lebanon – President Michel Aoun extended his condolences over the death of Rafsanjani to Iranian officials and the country's people. Prime Minister Saad Hariri also sent a message to Iranian President Rouhani, condoling him and the Iranian nation on the demise of Ayatollah Akbar Hashemi Rafsanjani. Hariri said that Iran lost a man, who was among the founders of the Islamic Republic of Iran and was an outstanding figure known for his moderate style. He used to forge interaction with countries on the basis of friendly relations, said Hariri. Condolence messages also came from pro-Iranian proxy Hezbollah, the group's secretary general Hassan Nasrallah describing Hashemi as a "fervent supporter of resistance". Senior Lebanese politician and Leader of the Druze Progressive Socialist Party Walid Jumblatt praised Hashemi Rafsanjani for his role played in Iran's domestic and foreign policies.
- Malaysia – Malaysian Foreign Minister Anifah Aman in a message to his Iranian counterpart Mohammad Javad Zarif said that the demise of Ayatollah Hashemi Rafsanjani is a really great loss for the Iranian people and government. '"I was saddened to hear the news of Ayatollah Akbar Hashemi Rafsanjani's demise. His sudden death is a really great loss for the Iranian people and government," the message said.
- Oman – Sultan Qaboos, the country's ruler, sent a message of condolence to Iran over Rafsanjani's death.
- Pakistan – Prime Minister Nawaz Sharif expressed deep grief over the death of Akbar Hashemi Rafsanjani, who took his last breath the previous day in Tehran. He said Rafsanjani was an influential figure not only in Iran but also a symbol of reconciliatory peace efforts at the international level.
- Palestine – Islamic Jihad Movement expressed sorrow over the death of Iran's former president issuing a message. A Hamas representative in Tehran also sent condolences and expressed grief over the demise. Palestinian embassy in Tehran also offered condolences in a statement. "The sad incident of the demise of Ayatollah Rafsanjani affected the sentiments of the Palestinian nation since they lost a great supporter," the message reads.
- Qatar – Emir Tamim bin Hamad Al Thani sent a message and condolences with the government and people of Iran.

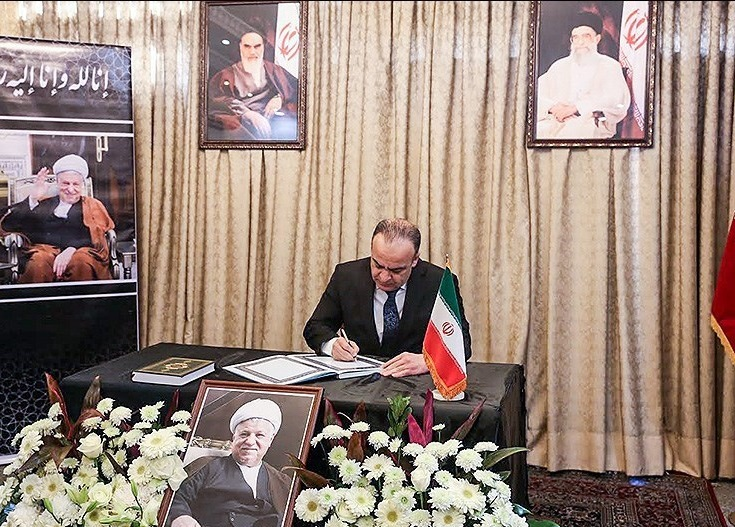
Syrian officials signs a memorial book for condolence in Iran's embassy at Damascus

- (Ba'athist Syria) Syria – President Bashar al-Assad expressed condolences over the passing of Iran's former president and chairman of the Expediency Council Ayatollah Akbar Hashemi Rafsanjani. In separate messages to Supreme Leader Ayatollah Ali Khamenei and Iranian President Hassan Rouhani, Assad said the news of Ayatollah Rafsanjani's passing caused great sadness. He also stressed that the late cleric "lived a life of struggle against injustice and oppression, and he was known for his bold positions and tireless efforts to preserve the dignity and freedom of the Iranian people."
- Tajikistan – Tajik President Emomali Rahmon sent a message of condolence to his Iranian counterpart Hassan Rouhani, saying he is grieving at the news of the demise of the "prominent figure" of the Islamic Republic of Iran.
- Turkey – President Recep Tayyip Erdoğan sent a condolence message to his Iranian counterpart Hassan Rouhani and described him as the person who "developed Iran and Turkey relations". Foreign Minister Mevlüt Çavuşoğlu in a message on his Twitter page extended his condolences on the demise of late Chairman of the State Expediency Council Ayatollah Akbar Hashemi Rafsanjani. "With much sorrow I received the news on the passing away of former Iranian President (Akbar) Hashemi Rafsanjani and I wish him God's blessing and condole with his bereaved family and the Iranian nation on his demise," Cavusoglu said in his Twitter message. Former President Abdullah Gül also extended his condolences on Ayatollah Rafsanjani's death. Minister of European Union Affairs Ömer Çelik also sent a message.
- United Arab Emirates – President and Prime Minister of the country, Emir Khalifa bin Zayed Al Nahyan of Abu Dhabi and Emir Mohammed bin Rashid Al Maktoum of Dubai sent a cable of condolences to Iran's President Hassan Rouhani, on the death of former President Ali Akbar Hashemi Rafsanjani. Abu Dhabi Crown Prince Sheikh Mohammed bin Zayed Al Nahyan sent his condolences over the loss of Rafsanjani and extended his sympathy to the Ayatollah's family. Writing on his official Twitter account, Minister of State for Foreign Affairs Anwar Mohammed Qarqash described Rafsanjani as "one of the voices of political realism and moderation".

===== Europe =====
- Belarus – President Alexander Lukashenko has expressed condolences to Iran President Hassan Rouhani, the people of Iran, the family and friends of former president of Iran Akbar Hashemi Rafsanjani in connection with his passing.
- Bosnia and Herzegovina – Bakir Izetbegović, Bosniak Member of the Presidency of Bosnia and Herzegovina sent a condolence message to the government and nation of Iran and called Rafsanjani a "hero of the peace".
- Bulgaria – Outgoing President Rosen Plevneliev has extended condolences to President Hassan Rouhani on the death of the late Ayatollah Akbar Hashemi Rafsanjani. In his message, President Plevneliev expressed his deep sorrow and condolences to Iranian president and nation over demise of the Ayatollah.
- Cyprus – House of Representatives President Demetris Syllouris has conveyed his condolences in a letter to his Iranian counterpart Ali Larijani, over the death of former Iranian president Ayatollah Hashemi Rafsanjani. In his letter, he noted that Rafsanjani leaves behind a heritage in Iran's modern history which is also set apart "by his massive contribution to his country`s progress and prosperity."
- Germany – Foreign Minister Frank-Walter Steinmeier condoled the demise of Ayatollah Hasehmi Rafsanjani. In a message to his Iranian counterpart Mohammad Javad Zarif, Steinmeier expressed condolences to the people and government of Iran over the sad occasion.
- Italy – Italian President Sergio Mattarella, in a message on Wednesday to his Iranian counterpart Hassan Rouhani, condoled him on the death of the late Chairman of Iran's Expediency Council Ayatollah Akbar Hashemi Rafsanjani. Mattarella also extended condolences on his behalf and on the behalf of the Italian nation to the bereaved family of Ayatollah Rafsanjani and the whole Iranian nation. He said that serving as Iran's president, Ayatollah Rafsanjani played a significant role in expansion of the Iran-Italy ties based on firm belief in a mutual feeling of belonging to two very old civilizations.
- Latvia – Raimonds Vējonis, President of Latvia sent a condolence message and called Rafsanjani as a person who tried to extend Tehran's relations with the world.
- Poland – President Andrzej Duda condolences with Iranian government and people over decease of Rafsanjani.
- Russia – President Vladimir Putin condolences the decease of Rafsanjani in a message to the Iranian President.
- Slovenia – President Borut Pahor offered his condolence to the Iranian president on a message.
- United Kingdom – Islamic Centre of England condoles Ayatollah Rafsanjani's demise. "We wish to express our sorrow and sadness for the demise of this great man who had a major role in the history of the Islamic movement in Iran."

===== North America =====
- Cuba – Raúl Castro, President of Cuba, sent a message to his counterpart Hassan Rouhani to express condolences after the death of Rafsanjani. In his message, the Cuban dignitary asked to extend his sympathies to the relatives of the late Iranian leader.
- Nicaragua – President Daniel Ortega and his wife Vice President Rosario Murillo offered their condolence on their inauguration day in their message to President Hassan Rouhani called the late Ayatollah Rafsanjani as an outstanding figure in brotherly country of Iran. The two senior officials wrote in their message "We express our deepest and the most sincere condolences to Your Excellency, family of the late Ayatollah Rafsanjani, Iranian government and nation."
- United States – A US Department of State official also referred to Ayatollah Rafsanjani as a "prominent figure" throughout the history of Iran in a statement. "We send our condolences to his family and loved ones," said the statement. White House press secretary Josh Earnest also said Rafsanjani was a "prominent figure" and a "consequential figure" in Iran's history. He said the United States was sending its condolences to the Iranian people, but Earnest declined to speculate on how Rafsanjani's death might affect future Iranian policy toward the United States.

===== South America =====
- Venezuela – Foreign Ministry, publishing an official statement on the occasion, announced that President Nicolás Maduro had offered his deep condolences on demise of Ayatollah Akbar Hashemi Rafsanjani to Supreme Leader Ayatollah Ali Khamenei and President Hassan Rouhani. The statement said Rafsanjani played important role in establishment of the Islamic Republic of Iran and had noticeable influence on Iran's economic development before the imperialist aggression. Government of Venezuela underlines its solidarity with Iranian government and nation and expresses its condolences on demise of Ayatollah Rafsanjani, the Venezuelan government's statement concluded.

==== Supranational organisations ====
- United Nations – UN resident coordinator in Iran, Gary Lewis posted a message on his Twitter account, saying, "Entire UN family in Iran extends sincere condolences on sad demise of Fmr Pres Hashemi Rafsanjani".
- International Atomic Energy Agency – Director General Yukiya Amano offered his condelence over the news with signing a book of honour in Iran's embassy at Geneva.
- UNESCO – Irina Georgieva Bokova, head of UNESCO in a message condoled President Hassan Rouhani over the demise of the late Chairman of the Expediency Council Ayatollah Akbar Hashemi Rafsanjani. "Due to his enormous contribution to realization of reformist and moderate political trends to serve as the basis for Iran's development and its international engagement, Ayatollah Rafsanjani will never be forgotten," the message reads. In her message, she announced UNESCO's commitment to continue close cooperation with Iran to reinforce ties.
- Group of 77 – A minute of silence was also declared at group's summit in Geneva in honour of Hashemi.

== Controversies ==
The funeral veered slightly off script when groups of mourners started shouting opposition slogans. The authorities were forced to raise the volume on the loudspeakers playing lamentation songs after some in the crowds took up cries of using name of former presidential candidate, Mir-Hossein Mousavi, who has been under house arrest since 2011. Some of the chants were aimed at Russia, Iran's ally in the Syrian conflict. Video clips on social media showed mourners shouting "Death to Russia" (which was also shouted during the 2009 Iranian presidential election protests after Russian President Dmitry Medvedev became the first foreign leader to congratulate Mahmoud Ahmadinejad on his re-election) and "the Russian Embassy is the den of espionage," as they passed the embassy's complex in the heart of Tehran. People also called for the release of hunger strikers in Iranian prisons.

State television, broadcasting the funeral live, airbrushed the protests, which were nevertheless allowed to proceed without police intervention.

=== Assassination allegations ===
In a 2025 interview, Faezeh Hashemi, Akbar Rafsanjani's daughter, alleged that he was assassinated, not by Russia or Israel, but by the highest echelons of power in the Islamic Republic, because "he sided with the people and spoke out" and "he was in their way- so he had to be removed". According to political analyst, Mehdi Mahdavi-Azad, in the months preceding his death, Rafsanjani openly stated that he had made a mistake in choosing Khamenei as supreme leader. Rafsanjani's other daughter, Fatemeh, stated that two months before his death she was approached by two individuals who threatened that he "would be killed in a way that would make it appear a natural death". The combination of suspicious circumstances surrounding his death has given additional clout to the allegations of foul play, these include delays in his transport to the hospital, blocked access to CCTV footage from his office and his supposed place of death, absence of post-mortem examinations despite the family's requests, and the disappearance of his diaries and will from his office soon after his death. According to Rafsanjani’s family, the Supreme National Security Council’s official report stated that his body contained radiation levels ten times the safe limit. The official investigation into the death of Rafsanjani was concluded by the Secretary of Iran's Supreme National Security Council at the time, Ali Shamkhani, who stated that it was "completely natural and without any ambiguity".

== See also ==
- Death and state funeral of Ruhollah Khomeini
