= List of largest funerals =

This list of notable funerals represents significant historical funerals, based on both the number of attendants and estimated television audience.

== List ==
Funeral	Date	Country	City	No. of attendees	Television audience
C. N. Annadurai	February 4, 1969	India	Madras	~15,000,000	
Ali Khamenei	July 3–6, 2026	Iran and Iraq	Tehran	~15,000,000	
Ali Khamenei	July 7, 2026	Iran and Iraq	Qom	~15,000,000	
Ali Khamenei	July 8, 2026	Iran and Iraq	Najaf and Karbala	~15,000,000	
Ali Khamenei	July 9, 2026	Iran and Iraq	Mashhad	~15,000,000	
Qasem Soleimani	January 5, 2020	Iran	Ahvaz and Mashhad	~7,000,000	
Qasem Soleimani	January 6, 2020	Iran	Tehran and Qom	~7,000,000	
Qasem Soleimani	January 7, 2020	Iran	Kerman	~7,000,000	
Gamal Abdel Nasser	October 1, 1970	United Arab Republic	Cairo	~5,000,000−7,000,000	
Dahiru Usman Bauchi	November 28, 2025	Nigeria	Bauchi	~4,000,000	
Pope John Paul II	April 8, 2005	Vatican City	Rome	~4,000,000	2,000,000,000
Umm Kulthum	February 5, 1975	Egypt	Cairo	~4,000,000	
Indira Gandhi	November 3, 1984	India	Delhi	~3,500,000	
Eva Perón	August 9, 1952	Argentina	Buenos Aires	~3,000,000	
Ayrton Senna	May 5, 1994	Brazil	São Paulo	~3,000,000	(in Brazil) at least 100,000,000
Chiang Kai-shek	April 10–16, 1975	Taiwan	Taipei	~2,500,000	
Puneeth Rajkumar	October 29, 2021	India	Bengaluru	~2,500,000	50,000,000
Ruhollah Khomeini	June 5–6, 1989	Iran	Mausoleum of Ruhollah Khomeini, Tehran	~2,000,000−10,000,000	
Victor Hugo	June 1, 1885	France	Paris	~2,000,000−3,000,000	
Ramon Magsaysay	March 22, 1957	Philippines	Manila	~2,000,000	
Benigno Aquino Jr.	August 31, 1983	Philippines	Santo Domingo Church and Manila Memorial Park – Sucat, Metro Manila	~2,000,000	
Berkin Elvan	March 12, 2014	Turkey	Istanbul	~2,000,000	
Joseph Stalin	March 7, 1953	USSR	Moscow	~2,000,000	
J. Jayalalithaa	December 6, 2016	India	Chennai	~2,000,000	
Kim Il-sung	July 19, 1994	North Korea	Pyongyang	~2,000,000	
Mahatma Gandhi	February 6, 1948	India	New Delhi	~2,000,000	
Ziaur Rahman	June 2, 1981	Bangladesh	Dhaka	~2,000,000	
Khaleda Zia	December 30, 2025	Bangladesh	Dhaka	~1,600,000−3,200,000	
Bal Thackeray	November 18–19, 2012	India	Shivaji Park, Mumbai	~1,500,000− 2,000,000	
Arthur Wellesley, 1st Duke of Wellington	November 18, 1852	United Kingdom	London	~1,500,000	
Ulysses S. Grant	August 8, 1885	United States	New York City	~1,500,000	
Jawaharlal Nehru	May 28, 1964	India	New Delhi	~1,500,000	
Robert F. Kennedy	June 8, 1968	United States	New York City, Washington, D.C.	~1,000,000−2,000,000	
Hassan Nasrallah	February 23, 2025	Lebanon	Camille Chamoun, Beirut	~1,300,000−1,700,000	
Juan Perón	July 2–4, 1974	Argentina	Buenos Aires	~1,135,000	
Hugo Chávez	March 6–8, 2013	Venezuela	Caracas	~1,000,000−3,000,000	
Ilia II of Georgia	March 22, 2026	Georgia	Tbilisi	~1,000,000	
Palmiro Togliatti	August 24, 1964	Italy	Rome	~1,000,000	
Akhtar Raza Khan	July 20, 2018	India	Bareilly	~1,000,000	12,500,000
Enrico Berlinguer	June 13, 1984	Italy	Rome	~1,000,000	
GP Koirala	March 20, 2010	Nepal	Kathmandu	~1,000,000	
Ibrahim Rugova	January 27, 2006	Kosovo	Prishtina	~1,000,000	
Johnny Hallyday	December 9, 2017	France	Paris	~1,000,000	15,000,000
M. Karunanidhi	August 8, 2018	India	Chennai	~1,000,000	
Mother Teresa	September 13, 1997	India	Calcutta	~1,000,000	at least 1,000,000
Muhammad Zia Ul Haq	August 19, 1988	Pakistan	Islamabad	~1,000,000	
Pope Shenouda III	March 20, 2012	Egypt	Cairo	~1,000,000	
Diana, Princess of Wales	September 6, 1997	United Kingdom	London and Althorp, Northamptonshire	~1,000,000 (2,000 at funeral service)	2,500,000,000
Queen Elizabeth II	September 19, 2022	United Kingdom	London	~1,000,000 (2,000 at funeral service)	29,000,000 in the UK
Queen Elizabeth the Queen Mother	April 9, 2002	United Kingdom	London	~1,000,000	
Mao Zedong	September 9–18, 1976	China	Beijing	~1,000,000	
Nelson Mandela (memorial service)	December 10–15, 2013	South Africa	Johannesburg, Pretoria, and Qunu	~1,000,000; 1,000 for Memorial Service	
Võ Nguyên Giáp	October 12–13, 2013	Vietnam	Hanoi	~1,000,000	
M.G. Ramachandran	December 25, 1987	India	Madras	~1,000,000	
Ovadia Yosef	October 7, 2013	Israel	Jerusalem	~850,000	
King Hussein of Jordan	February 8, 1999	Jordan	Amman	~800,000	
Pierre Gemayel	November 23, 2006	Lebanon	Beirut	~800,000	
Mir Osman Ali Khan	February 25, 1967	India	Hyderabad	~800,000	
Chaim Kanievsky	March 20, 2022	Israel	Bnei Brak	~750,000	
Zubeen Garg	September 21–22, 2025	India	Guwahati	~700,000–1,500,000	
Josip Broz Tito	May 8, 1980	Yugoslavia	Belgrade	~700,000	
Pedro Aguirre Cerda	November 28, 1941	Chile	Santiago	~700,000	
Mustafa Kemal Atatürk	November 11, 1938	Turkey	Ankara	~600,000−750,000	
Jerzy Popiełuszko	November 3, 1984	Polish People's Republic	Warsaw	~600,000−1,000,000	
Carter Harrison III	October 31–November 1, 1893	United States	Chicago	~500,000–1,060,000 (funeral procession); ~100,000 (public visitation of casket)	—N/a
John F. Kennedy	November 25, 1963	United States	Washington, D.C.	~550,000−1,000,000	41,500,000
Georgi Asparuhov	June 30–July 2, 1971	Bulgaria	Sofia	~550,000	
Tomáš Garrigue Masaryk	September 21, 1937	Czechoslovakia	Prague	~500,000−750,000	
Juan Gabriel	September 4–5, 2016	Mexico	Ciudad Juárez, Chihuahua and Mexico City	~500,000−1,000,000	
August Spies, George Engel, Adolph Fischer, and Albert Parsons (executed Haymarket Affair defendants)	November 13, 1887	United States	Chicago	~500,000	—N/a
Baruch Charney Vladeck	November 2, 1938	United States	New York City	~500,000-750,000	
B. R. Ambedkar	December 6, 1956	India	Mumbai	~500,000	
Carmen Miranda	August 12, 1955	Brazil	Rio de Janeiro	~500,000	
Buenaventura Durruti	November 23, 1936	Spain	Barcelona	~500,000	
Engelbert Dollfuss	July 30, 1934	Austria	Vienna	~500,000	
Michael Collins	August 28, 1922	Ireland	Dublin	~500,000	—N/a
Patriarch Pavle	November 19, 2009	Serbia	Rakovica Monastery, Belgrade	~500,000	
Sathya Sai Baba	April 24, 2011	India	Puttaparthi, Andhra Pradesh	~500,000	
Winston Churchill	January 30, 1965	United Kingdom	London	~500,000 (6,000 at funeral service)	350,000,000
Osman Hadi	December 20, 2025	Bangladesh	Dhaka	~500,000−1,000,000	
Necmettin Erbakan	March 1, 2011	Turkey	Istanbul	~400,000−2,000,000	
Pope Francis	April 21–26, 2025	Vatican City	Rome	~400,000	
Akbar Hashemi Rafsanjani	January 9–11, 2017	Iran	Tehran	~330,000−2,500,000	
Francisco Franco	November 22–23, 1975	Spain	Madrid	~300,000−500,000	
Fernando Poe Jr.	December 22, 2004	Philippines	Santo Domingo Church and Manila North Cemetery, Metro Manila	~300,000	
Giuseppe Verdi	February 27, 1901	Italy	Milan	~300,000	
Giuseppe Verdi	January 30, 1901	Italy	Milan	~10,000	
Martin Luther King Jr.	April 9, 1968	United States	Atlanta	~300,000	120,000,000
John Monash	October 11, 1931	Australia	Melbourne	~300,000	
Abdulbaki Erol	July 13, 2023	Turkey	Adıyaman	~250,000	
Hendrik Verwoerd	September 10, 1966	South Africa	Pretoria	~250,000	
Heydar Aliyev	December 15, 2003	Azerbaijan	Baku	~250,000	
Józef Piłsudski	May 18, 1935	Poland	Kraków	~250,000	
Sholem Aleichem	May 13, 1916	United States	New York City	~250,000	
Emperor Hirohito	February 24, 1989	Japan	Tokyo	~250,000	
Pelé	January 2–3, 2023	Brazil	Santos	~230,000	
Wali Rahmani	April 4, 2021	India	Munger	~200,000−500,000	
Pedro II of Brazil	December 9, 1891	France	Paris	~200,000−300,000	
Mohammed Burhanuddin	January 17, 2014	India	Raudat Tahera, Mumbai	~200,000	
Anton Cermak	March 8–10, 1933	United States	Chicago	hundreds of thousands: ~50,000 mourners for return of mayor's remains to city (March 8); ~25,000 spectators at funeral service in Chicago Stadium (March 10); ~50,000 marchers and "hundreds of thousands" of additional mourners at funeral procession (March 10)	
Burhan Wani	July 8, 2016	India	Pulwama	~200,000	
Hrant Dink	January 23, 2007	Turkey	Istanbul	~200,000	
Khadim Hussain Rizvi	November 21, 2020	Pakistan	Lahore	~200,000	
Kim Jong-il	December 28, 2011	North Korea	Pyongyang	~200,000	
Paul von Hindenburg	August 6–7, 1934	Nazi Germany	Tannenberg Memorial, Hohenstein in Ostpreußen	~200,000	(via radio, not television) at least 1,000,000
Wilhelm I	March 12–16, 1888	German Empire	Berlin	~200,000	
Rosa Luxemburg and Karl Liebknecht	June 13, 1919	Weimar Republic	Berlin	~200,000	
Jānis Čakste	March 18, 1927	Latvia	Rīga	~200,000	
Rafic Hariri	February 16, 2005	Lebanon	Beirut	~200,000	
Pope Benedict XVI	January 5, 2023	Vatican City	Rome	~200,000	
Roman Dmowski	January 7, 1939	Poland	Warsaw	~200,000	
Zoran Đinđić	March 15, 2003	FR Yugoslavia	Belgrade	~200,000	
Imre Nagy (reburial)	June 16, 1989	Hungary	Budapest	~150,000−250,000	
Yaakov Yisrael Kanievsky	August 12, 1985	Israel	Bnei Brak	~150,000−250,000	
Halid Bešlić	October 13, 2025	Bosnia and Herzegovina	Sarajevo	~150,000	over 1,000,000
Lech and Maria Kaczyński	April 18, 2010	Poland	Kraków	~150,000	~13,000,000
Abraham Lincoln	April 19 – May 3, 1865	United States	East and Midwest	~150,000	—N/a
Corazon Aquino	August 1–5, 2009	Philippines	Manila Cathedral and Manila Memorial Park – Sucat, Metro Manila	~122,000 (August 3 figures only)	
Stefan Wyszyński	May 31, 1981	Polish People's Republic	Warsaw	~120,000−500,000	
Moshe Feinstein	March 24, 1986	United States	New York City and Israel	~120,000−400,000	
Ronald Reagan	June 7, 2004	United States	Simi Valley, California and Washington, D.C.	~104,684	35,700,000
Uğur Mumcu	January 27, 1993	Turkey	Istanbul	~100,000−150,000	
Aleksandar Ranković	August 22, 1983	Yugoslavia	Belgrade	~100,000	
Alparslan Türkeş	April 8, 1997	Turkey	Ankara	~100,000	
Kostis Palamas	February 12, 1943	Greece	Athens	~100,000	
Édith Piaf	October 11, 1963	France	Père Lachaise Cemetery, Paris	~100,000	
Bob Marley	May 21, 1981	Jamaica	Kingston	~100,000	
Bobby Sands	May 7, 1981	UK	Belfast	~100,000	
Henry George	October 29, 1897	United States	New York City	~100,000	
Charles de Gaulle	November 12, 1970	France	Colombey	~100,000+	
Lee Kuan Yew	March 23–29, 2015	Singapore	Mandai	~1,500,000 (paid respects) ~100,000 (funeral cortege)	~9,000
Lorenzo Bandini	May 10, 1967	Italy	Reggiolo	~100,000	
Mahmut Ustaosmanoğlu	June 24, 2022	Turkey	Istanbul	~100,000	
Muhammad Ali (memorial service)	June 10, 2016	United States	Louisville, Kentucky	~100,000 (funeral procession); 15,000 (memorial service)	1,000,000,000
Robert Menzies	May 19, 1978	Australia	Melbourne	~100,000	
Turgut Özal	April 21, 1993	Turkey	Ankara	~100,000	
Gianni Agnelli	January 26, 2003	Italy	Turin	~10,000; ~100,000 paid their respects while he lay in state	
Yahya Ayyash	January 6, 1996	Palestine	Gaza	~100,000	
Yisroel Avrohom Portugal	April 2, 2019	United States	Brooklyn, New York City	~100,000	
Zubayer Ahmad Ansari	April 18, 2020	Bangladesh	Brahmanbaria	~100,000	
Bhupen Hazarika	November 5–9, 2011	India	Guwahati	~100,000	
Joel Teitelbaum	August 20, 1979	United States	Kiryas Joel	~100,000	
Simcha Bunim Alter	June 8, 1992	Israel	Mount of Olives	~100,000	
Nahum Meir Schaikewitz	November 26, 1905	United States	New York City	~100,000	
Charlie Kirk (memorial service)	September 21, 2025	United States	Glendale	~90,000−277,000	~5,200,000
George Best	December 3, 2005	United Kingdom	Belfast	~75,000−100,000	
Elvis Presley	August 16–18, 1977	United States	Memphis	~75,000	
Selena Quintanilla-Pérez	April 3, 1995	United States	Corpus Christi, Texas	~60,000	
Juliana of the Netherlands	March 30, 2004	Netherlands	Delft	~60,000 Also, 50,000 people paid their respects at the coffin while Juliana lay in state prior to the funeral.	3,246,000
Shane Warne	March 30, 2022	Australia	Melbourne	~55,000	1,500,000
Richard Nixon	April 26–27, 1994	United States	Richard Nixon Presidential Library and Museum, Yorba Linda, California	~54,000	28,300,000
Jaime Garzón	August 14, 1999	Colombia	Bogotá	~50,000	
Yisrael Alter	February 21, 1977	Israel	Mount of Olives	~50,000	
Meir Shapiro	October 29, 1933	Poland	Lublin	~50,000	
Batsheva Kanievsky	October, 2011	Israel	Bnei Brak	~50,000	
André Hazes	September 27, 2004	Netherlands	Amsterdam	~48,000	6,000,000 (5 million in the Netherlands and 1 million in Belgium)
Paweł Adamowicz	January 19, 2019	Poland	Gdańsk	~45,000	
Gershon Agron	November 2, 1959	Israel	Jerusalem	~40,000	
Ozjasz Thon	November 12, 1936	Poland	Kraków	~30,000	
Pim Fortuyn	May 10, 2002	Netherlands	Driehuis	~20,000−30,000	2,000,000
Ludwig van Beethoven	March 29, 1827	Austrian Empire	Vienna	~20,000	
Rico Yan	April 4, 2002	Philippines	Manila Memorial Park – Sucat, Parañaque	~20,000	
Moshe Teitelbaum	August 25, 2006	United States	Willamsburg and Kiryas Joel	~20,000	
Aharon Rokeach	August 18, 1957	Israel	Har HaMenuchot	~20,000	
Michael Jackson (memorial service)	July 7, 2009	United States	Staples Center, Los Angeles	~17,500	3,000,000,000
Hank Williams	January 4, 1953	United States	Montgomery	~15,000−25,000	
John Garfield	May 23, 1952	United States	New York	~10,000	
Raila Odinga	October 15, 2025	Kenya	Nairobi	~10,000	
Wisława Szymborska	February 9, 2012	Poland	Kraków	~8,000−10,000	
Czesław Miłosz	August 27, 2004	Poland	Kraków	~7,000−10,000	
Ibn Taymiyya	September 26, 1328	Syria	Damascus	~6,000−500,000	
