= We Are Armed with Allahu Akbar =

1979 song

ما مسلح به «الله اکبر»یم
English: We Are Armed with Allahu Akbar
- Personal anthem of the Supreme Leader of Iran Personal anthem of the President of Iran Organizational anthem of the Islamic Republic of Iran Broadcasting
- Lyrics: unknown, 1979
- Music: unknown, 1979
- Adopted: 1979

"We Are Armed with Allahu Akbar" (Persian: ما مسلح به «الله اکبر»یم, romanized: Mā mosallah be "Allāho Akbar"im) is the name of an Iranian 1979 Islamic revolutionary military march song performed by IRGC troops in front of Ayatollah Khomeini in Jamaran Hussainiya. For more than three decades, the song was played before each television newscast across all IRIB TV channels and hours, and still plays before IRIB's flagship 7 pm IRST (UTC+03:30) news bulletin on TV1 and IRINN. The song lyrics are partially composed of parts from Muhammad's speech for the victory of the Conquest of Mecca, saying "There is no deity but God, the one. He has fulfilled His promise, He held to his servant" (Arabic: لَا إِلَٰهَ إِلَّا ٱللَّٰهُ وَحْدَهُ، أَنْجَزَ وَعْدَهُ، وَنَصَرَ عَبْدَهُ).

== Lyrics ==
=== Khomeini era (1979–89) ===
Persian original

ما مسلّح به ٱلله اکبریم / بر صف دشمنان حمله می‌بریم

ما همه پیرو خط رهبریم / بر صف مشرکان حمله می‌بریم

لا الٰه لا الٰه لا الٰه الّا ٱلله / لا الٰه لا الٰه لا الٰه الّا ٱلله

وحدهُ وحدهُ وحدهُ وحده / انجزَ انجزَ انجزَ وعده

نصرَ نصرَ نصرَ عبده / لا شریک لا شریک لا شریکَ له

انجزَ وعده و نصرَ عبده / الله اکبر خمینی رهبر

Persian romanization

Mā mosallah be Allāho Akbarim / Bar saff-e došmanān hamle mibarim

Mā hame peyrov-e xatt-e rahbarim / Bar saff-e mošrekān hamle mibarim

Lā elāh lā elāh lā elāha ellā llāh / Lā elāh lā elāh lā elāha ellā llāh

Wahdahu wahdahu wahdahu wahda / Anjaza anjaza anjaza wa'da

Nasara nasara nasara abda / Lā šarik lā šarik lā šarika la

Anjaza wa'da wa nasara abda / Allāho Akbar Xomeyni rahbar

Persian IPA transcription

[mɒː mo.sæl.ˈlæh be ʔæl.lɒː.ˈhow ʔækʰ.ˈbæɾ.iːm / bæɾ ˈsæ.fe d̪oʃ.mæn.ˈɒːn hæm.ˈle ˈmiː.bæɾ.iːm]

[mɒː hæ.ˈme pʰej.ˈɾo.ve ˈxæ.t̪ʰe ræh.ˈbæɾ.iːm / bæɾ ˈsæ.fe moʃ.ɾekʰ.ˈɒːn hæm.ˈle ˈmiː.bæɾ.iːm]

[lɒː ʔe.ˈlɒːh lɒː ʔe.ˈlɒːh lɒː ʔe.lɒː.ˈhæ ʔel.læ‿l.ˈlɒːh / lɒː ʔe.ˈlɒːh lɒː ʔe.ˈlɒːh lɒː ʔe.lɒː.ˈhæ ʔel.læ‿l.ˈlɒːh]

[wæh.d̪æ.ˈhuː wæh.d̪æ.ˈhuː wæh.d̪æ.ˈhuː wæh.ˈd̪æ / ʔæn.d͡ʒæ.ˈzæ ʔæn.d͡ʒæ.ˈzæ ʔæn.d͡ʒæ.ˈzæ wæʔ.ˈd̪æ]

[næ.sæ.ˈɾæ næ.sæ.ˈɾæ næ.sæ.ˈɾæ ʔæb.ˈd̪æ / lɒː ʃæ.ˈɾiːkʰ lɒː ʃæ.ˈɾiːkʰ lɒː ʃæ.ɾiː.ˈkʰæ læ]

[ʔæn.d͡ʒæ.ˈzæ wæʔ.ˈd̪æ wæ næ.sæ.ˈɾæ ʔæb.ˈd̪æ / ʔæl.lɒː.ˈhow ʔækʰ.ˈbæɾ xo.mej.ˈniː ræh.ˈbæɾ]

English translation

We are armed with Allahu Akbar / We attack the enemy's lines

We are all followers of the Leader / We attack the polytheists' lines

There is no, there is no, there is no deity but Allah / There is no, there is no, there is no deity but Allah

He is the sole God, He is the sole God, He is the sole God, the sole / He fulfilled, He fulfilled, He fulfilled His promise

Succeeded, Succeeded, His servants succeeded / There is no partner, no partner, no partner for Him

He fulfilled his promise and His servant succeeded / Allah is greater, Khomeini is the Leader

=== Supreme Leader version ===
==== Khamenei era (1989–2026) ====
Persian original

ما مسلّح به ٱلله اکبریم / بر صف دشمنان حمله می‌بریم

ما همه پیرو خط رهبریم / بر صف مشرکان حمله می‌بریم

لا الٰه لا الٰه لا الٰه الّا ٱلله / لا الٰه لا الٰه لا الٰه الّا ٱلله

وحدهُ وحدهُ وحدهُ وحده / انجزَ انجزَ انجزَ وعده

نصرَ نصرَ نصرَ عبده / لا شریک لا شریک لا شریکَ له

انجزَ وعده و نصرَ عبده / الله اکبر خامنه‌ای رهبر

Persian romanization

Mā mosallah be Allāho Akbarim / Bar saff-e došmanān hamle mibarim

Mā hame peyrov-e xatt-e rahbarim / Bar saff-e mošrekān hamle mibarim

Lā elāh lā elāh lā elāha ellā llāh / Lā elāh lā elāh lā elāha ellā llāh

Wahdahu wahdahu wahdahu wahda / Anjaza anjaza anjaza wa'da

Nasara nasara nasara abda / Lā šarik lā šarik lā šarika la

Anjaza wa'da wa nasara abda / Allāho Akbar Xāmene’i rahbar

Persian IPA transcription

[mɒː mo.sæl.ˈlæh be ʔæl.lɒː.ˈhow ʔækʰ.ˈbæɾ.iːm / bæɾ ˈsæ.fe d̪oʃ.mæn.ˈɒːn hæm.ˈle ˈmiː.bæɾ.iːm]

[mɒː hæ.ˈme pʰej.ˈɾo.ve ˈxæ.t̪ʰe ræh.ˈbæɾ.iːm / bæɾ ˈsæ.fe moʃ.ɾekʰ.ˈɒːn hæm.ˈle ˈmiː.bæɾ.iːm]

[lɒː ʔe.ˈlɒːh lɒː ʔe.ˈlɒːh lɒː ʔe.lɒː.ˈhæ ʔel.læ‿l.ˈlɒːh / lɒː ʔe.ˈlɒːh lɒː ʔe.ˈlɒːh lɒː ʔe.lɒː.ˈhæ ʔel.læ‿l.ˈlɒːh]

[wæh.d̪æ.ˈhuː wæh.d̪æ.ˈhuː wæh.d̪æ.ˈhuː wæh.ˈd̪æ / ʔæn.d͡ʒæ.ˈzæ ʔæn.d͡ʒæ.ˈzæ ʔæn.d͡ʒæ.ˈzæ wæʔ.ˈd̪æ]

[næ.sæ.ˈɾæ næ.sæ.ˈɾæ næ.sæ.ˈɾæ ʔæb.ˈd̪æ / lɒː ʃæ.ˈɾiːkʰ lɒː ʃæ.ˈɾiːkʰ lɒː ʃæ.ɾiː.ˈkʰæ læ]

[ʔæn.d͡ʒæ.ˈzæ wæʔ.ˈd̪æ wæ næ.sæ.ˈɾæ ʔæb.ˈd̪æ / ʔæl.lɒː.ˈhow ʔækʰ.ˈbæɾ xɒːmeneˈʔiː ræh.ˈbæɾ]

English translation

We are armed with Allahu Akbar / We attack the enemy's lines

We are all followers of the Leader / We attack the polytheists' lines

There is no, there is no, there is no deity but Allah / There is no, there is no, there is no deity but Allah

He is the sole God, He is the sole God, He is the sole God, the sole / He fulfilled, He fulfilled, He fulfilled His promise

Succeeded, Succeeded, His servants succeeded / There is no partner, no partner, no partner for Him

He fulfilled his promise and His servant succeeded / Allah is greater, Khamenei is the Leader

==== Khamenei era (2026–present) ====
Persian original

ما مسلّح به ٱلله اکبریم / بر صف دشمنان حمله می‌بریم

ما همه پیرو خط رهبریم / بر صف مشرکان حمله می‌بریم

لا الٰه لا الٰه لا الٰه الّا ٱلله / لا الٰه لا الٰه لا الٰه الّا ٱلله

وحدهُ وحدهُ وحدهُ وحده / انجزَ انجزَ انجزَ وعده

نصرَ نصرَ نصرَ عبده / لا شریک لا شریک لا شریکَ له

انجزَ وعده و نصرَ عبده / الله اکبر خامنه‌ای رهبر

Persian romanization

Mā mosallah be Allāho Akbarim / Bar saff-e došmanān hamle mibarim

Mā hame peyrov-e xatt-e rahbarim / Bar saff-e mošrekān hamle mibarim

Lā elāh lā elāh lā elāha ellā llāh / Lā elāh lā elāh lā elāha ellā llāh

Wahdahu wahdahu wahdahu wahda / Anjaza anjaza anjaza wa'da

Nasara nasara nasara abda / Lā šarik lā šarik lā šarika la

Anjaza wa'da wa nasara abda / Allāho Akbar Xāmene’i rahbar

Persian IPA transcription

[mɒː mo.sæl.ˈlæh be ʔæl.lɒː.ˈhow ʔækʰ.ˈbæɾ.iːm / bæɾ ˈsæ.fe d̪oʃ.mæn.ˈɒːn hæm.ˈle ˈmiː.bæɾ.iːm]

[mɒː hæ.ˈme pʰej.ˈɾo.ve ˈxæ.t̪ʰe ræh.ˈbæɾ.iːm / bæɾ ˈsæ.fe moʃ.ɾekʰ.ˈɒːn hæm.ˈle ˈmiː.bæɾ.iːm]

[lɒː ʔe.ˈlɒːh lɒː ʔe.ˈlɒːh lɒː ʔe.lɒː.ˈhæ ʔel.læ‿l.ˈlɒːh / lɒː ʔe.ˈlɒːh lɒː ʔe.ˈlɒːh lɒː ʔe.lɒː.ˈhæ ʔel.læ‿l.ˈlɒːh]

[wæh.d̪æ.ˈhuː wæh.d̪æ.ˈhuː wæh.d̪æ.ˈhuː wæh.ˈd̪æ / ʔæn.d͡ʒæ.ˈzæ ʔæn.d͡ʒæ.ˈzæ ʔæn.d͡ʒæ.ˈzæ wæʔ.ˈd̪æ]

[næ.sæ.ˈɾæ næ.sæ.ˈɾæ næ.sæ.ˈɾæ ʔæb.ˈd̪æ / lɒː ʃæ.ˈɾiːkʰ lɒː ʃæ.ˈɾiːkʰ lɒː ʃæ.ɾiː.ˈkʰæ læ]

[ʔæn.d͡ʒæ.ˈzæ wæʔ.ˈd̪æ wæ næ.sæ.ˈɾæ ʔæb.ˈd̪æ / ʔæl.lɒː.ˈhow ʔækʰ.ˈbæɾ xɒːmeneˈʔiː ræh.ˈbæɾ]

English translation

We are armed with Allahu Akbar / We attack the enemy's lines

We are all followers of the Leader / We attack the polytheists' lines

There is no, there is no, there is no deity but Allah / There is no, there is no, there is no deity but Allah

He is the sole God, He is the sole God, He is the sole God, the sole / He fulfilled, He fulfilled, He fulfilled His promise

Succeeded, Succeeded, His servants succeeded / There is no partner, no partner, no partner for Him

He fulfilled his promise and His servant succeeded / Allah is greater, Khamenei is the Leader

=== President version ===
==== Raisi era (2021–2024) ====
Persian original

ما مسلّح به ٱلله اکبریم / بر صف دشمنان حمله می‌بریم

ما همه پیرو خط رئیس‌یم / بر صف مشرکان حمله می‌بریم

لا الٰه لا الٰه لا الٰه الّا ٱلله / لا الٰه لا الٰه لا الٰه الّا ٱلله

وحدهُ وحدهُ وحدهُ وحده / انجزَ انجزَ انجزَ وعده

نصرَ نصرَ نصرَ عبده / لا شریک لا شریک لا شریکَ له

انجزَ وعده و نصرَ عبده / الله اکبر رئیسی رئیس‌

Persian romanization

Mā mosallah be Allāho Akbarim / Bar saff-e došmanān hamle mibarim

Mā hame peyrov-e xatt-e raeiseham / Bar saff-e mošrekān hamle mibarim

Lā elāh lā elāh lā elāha ellā llāh / Lā elāh lā elāh lā elāha ellā llāh

Wahdahu wahdahu wahdahu wahda / Anjaza anjaza anjaza wa'da

Nasara nasara nasara abda / Lā šarik lā šarik lā šarika la

Anjaza wa'da wa nasara abda / Allāho Akbar Raeisi raeis

Persian IPA transcription

[mɒː mo.sæl.ˈlæh be ʔæl.lɒː.ˈhow ʔækʰ.ˈbæɾ.iːm / bæɾ ˈsæ.fe d̪oʃ.mæn.ˈɒːn hæm.ˈle ˈmiː.bæɾ.iːm]

[mɒː hæ.ˈme pʰej.ˈɾo.ve ˈxæ.t̪ʰe ræ.ˈes.haːm / bæɾ ˈsæ.fe moʃ.ɾekʰ.ˈɒːn hæm.ˈle ˈmiː.bæɾ.iːm]

[lɒː ʔe.ˈlɒːh lɒː ʔe.ˈlɒːh lɒː ʔe.lɒː.ˈhæ ʔel.læ‿l.ˈlɒːh / lɒː ʔe.ˈlɒːh lɒː ʔe.ˈlɒːh lɒː ʔe.lɒː.ˈhæ ʔel.læ‿l.ˈlɒːh]

[wæh.d̪æ.ˈhuː wæh.d̪æ.ˈhuː wæh.d̪æ.ˈhuː wæh.ˈd̪æ / ʔæn.d͡ʒæ.ˈzæ ʔæn.d͡ʒæ.ˈzæ ʔæn.d͡ʒæ.ˈzæ wæʔ.ˈd̪æ]

[næ.sæ.ˈɾæ næ.sæ.ˈɾæ næ.sæ.ˈɾæ ʔæb.ˈd̪æ / lɒː ʃæ.ˈɾiːkʰ lɒː ʃæ.ˈɾiːkʰ lɒː ʃæ.ɾiː.ˈkʰæ læ]

[ʔæn.d͡ʒæ.ˈzæ wæʔ.ˈd̪æ wæ næ.sæ.ˈɾæ ʔæb.ˈd̪æ / ʔæl.lɒː.ˈhow ʔækʰ.ˈbæɾ ɾæʔiːˈsiː ræ.ˈes]

English translation

We are armed with Allahu Akbar / We attack the enemy's lines

We are all followers of the President / We attack the polytheists' lines

There is no, there is no, there is no deity but Allah / There is no, there is no, there is no deity but Allah

He is the sole God, He is the sole God, He is the sole God, the sole / He fulfilled, He fulfilled, He fulfilled His promise

Succeeded, Succeeded, His servants succeeded / There is no partner, no partner, no partner for Him

He fulfilled his promise and His servant succeeded / Allah is greater, Raisi is the President

==== Pezeshkian era (2024–present) ====
Persian original

ما مسلّح به ٱلله اکبریم / بر صف دشمنان حمله می‌بریم

ما همه پیرو خط رئیس‌یم / بر صف مشرکان حمله می‌بریم

لا الٰه لا الٰه لا الٰه الّا ٱلله / لا الٰه لا الٰه لا الٰه الّا ٱلله

وحدهُ وحدهُ وحدهُ وحده / انجزَ انجزَ انجزَ وعده

نصرَ نصرَ نصرَ عبده / لا شریک لا شریک لا شریکَ له

انجزَ وعده و نصرَ عبده / الله اکبر پزشکیان رئیس‌

Persian romanization

Mā mosallah be Allāho Akbarim / Bar saff-e došmanān hamle mibarim

Mā hame peyrov-e xatt-e raeiseham / Bar saff-e mošrekān hamle mibarim

Lā elāh lā elāh lā elāha ellā llāh / Lā elāh lā elāh lā elāha ellā llāh

Wahdahu wahdahu wahdahu wahda / Anjaza anjaza anjaza wa'da

Nasara nasara nasara abda / Lā šarik lā šarik lā šarika la

Anjaza wa'da wa nasara abda / Allāho Akbar Pezeshkian raeis

Persian IPA transcription

[mɒː mo.sæl.ˈlæh be ʔæl.lɒː.ˈhow ʔækʰ.ˈbæɾ.iːm / bæɾ ˈsæ.fe d̪oʃ.mæn.ˈɒːn hæm.ˈle ˈmiː.bæɾ.iːm]

[mɒː hæ.ˈme pʰej.ˈɾo.ve ˈxæ.t̪ʰe ræ.ˈes.haːm / bæɾ ˈsæ.fe moʃ.ɾekʰ.ˈɒːn hæm.ˈle ˈmiː.bæɾ.iːm]

[lɒː ʔe.ˈlɒːh lɒː ʔe.ˈlɒːh lɒː ʔe.lɒː.ˈhæ ʔel.læ‿l.ˈlɒːh / lɒː ʔe.ˈlɒːh lɒː ʔe.ˈlɒːh lɒː ʔe.lɒː.ˈhæ ʔel.læ‿l.ˈlɒːh]

[wæh.d̪æ.ˈhuː wæh.d̪æ.ˈhuː wæh.d̪æ.ˈhuː wæh.ˈd̪æ / ʔæn.d͡ʒæ.ˈzæ ʔæn.d͡ʒæ.ˈzæ ʔæn.d͡ʒæ.ˈzæ wæʔ.ˈd̪æ]

[næ.sæ.ˈɾæ næ.sæ.ˈɾæ næ.sæ.ˈɾæ ʔæb.ˈd̪æ / lɒː ʃæ.ˈɾiːkʰ lɒː ʃæ.ˈɾiːkʰ lɒː ʃæ.ɾiː.ˈkʰæ læ]

[ʔæn.d͡ʒæ.ˈzæ wæʔ.ˈd̪æ wæ næ.sæ.ˈɾæ ʔæb.ˈd̪æ / ʔæl.lɒː.ˈhow ʔækʰ.ˈbæɾ pəzɛʃˈkiː.ɑːn ræ.ˈes]

English translation

We are armed with Allahu Akbar / We attack the enemy's lines

We are all followers of the President / We attack the polytheists' lines

There is no, there is no, there is no deity but Allah / There is no, there is no, there is no deity but Allah

He is the sole God, He is the sole God, He is the sole God, the sole / He fulfilled, He fulfilled, He fulfilled His promise

Succeeded, Succeeded, His servants succeeded / There is no partner, no partner, no partner for Him

He fulfilled his promise and His servant succeeded / Allah is greater, Pezeshkian is the President

== See also ==
- The Angelus (Irish broadcast) and RTÉ News: Six One: stemming from the Roman Catholic tradition of Angelus, the RTÉ in the Republic of Ireland airs the sound of Angelus bells every night at 6 pm IST on RTÉ One, before its evening news bulletin starts at 6:01 pm. The key difference is that the "We Are Armed with Allahu Akbar" song and its accompanying video sequence are incorporated into the title sequence of IRIB's 7 pm news bulletin, while RTÉ's broadcast of Angelus is technically separate from the Six One news.
