= Mohammad Mohammadi Golpayegani =

Iranian Shia Islamic cleric (born 1943)

Hujjat al-Islam Mohammad Mohammadi Golpayegani
- محمد محمدی گلپایگانی
- Golpayegani in 2026

Chief of Staff to the Supreme Leader
- Incumbent
- Assumed office c. 1989
- Supreme Leader: Ali Khamenei; Mojtaba Khamenei
- Preceded by: Mohammad-Reza Tavassoli

Personal details
- Born: 1943 (age 82–83) Golpayegan, Pahlavi Iran

Gholam Hossein Mohammadi (Persian: غلام حسین محمدی; born c. 1943), better known as Mohammad Mohammadi Golpayegani (Persian: محمد محمدی گلپایگانی), is an Iranian Shia cleric who has been the chief of staff of the Office of the Supreme Leader of Iran since 1989. He is also famous as "Hujjat al-Islam Golpayegani" was born in 1943 (1322 S.H.) in the city of Golpayegan, in Isfahan province.

His father, Abul Qasim Mohammadi Golpayegani, was well known as an Islamic scholar/commentator; he was also the Imam of Friday Prayer in Golpayegan, a city northwest of Isfahan. He was among the political warriors against Mohammad Reza Pahlavi, and also among the audience in the event of attack to Feyziyeh School. Mohammadi Golpayegani is a poet, too, and there have been published poems in his name in the press of Iran. "Persian Gulf" is regarded among his prominent poems that describes it according to his words.

One of his sons married Boshra Khamenei, daughter of Iran's second Supreme Leader Ali Khamenei. Boshra and Golpayegani's 14-month old granddaughter, Zahra Mohammadi Golpayegani, were killed in 2026 in the same strike that resulted in the assassination of Ali Khamenei.

== See also ==
- Office of the Supreme Leader of Iran
- Supreme Leader of Iran
- Ali Khamenei
- Ali Asghar Hejazi
