= Office of the Supreme Leader of Iran =

Official residence and workplace

Office of the Supreme Leadership Authority

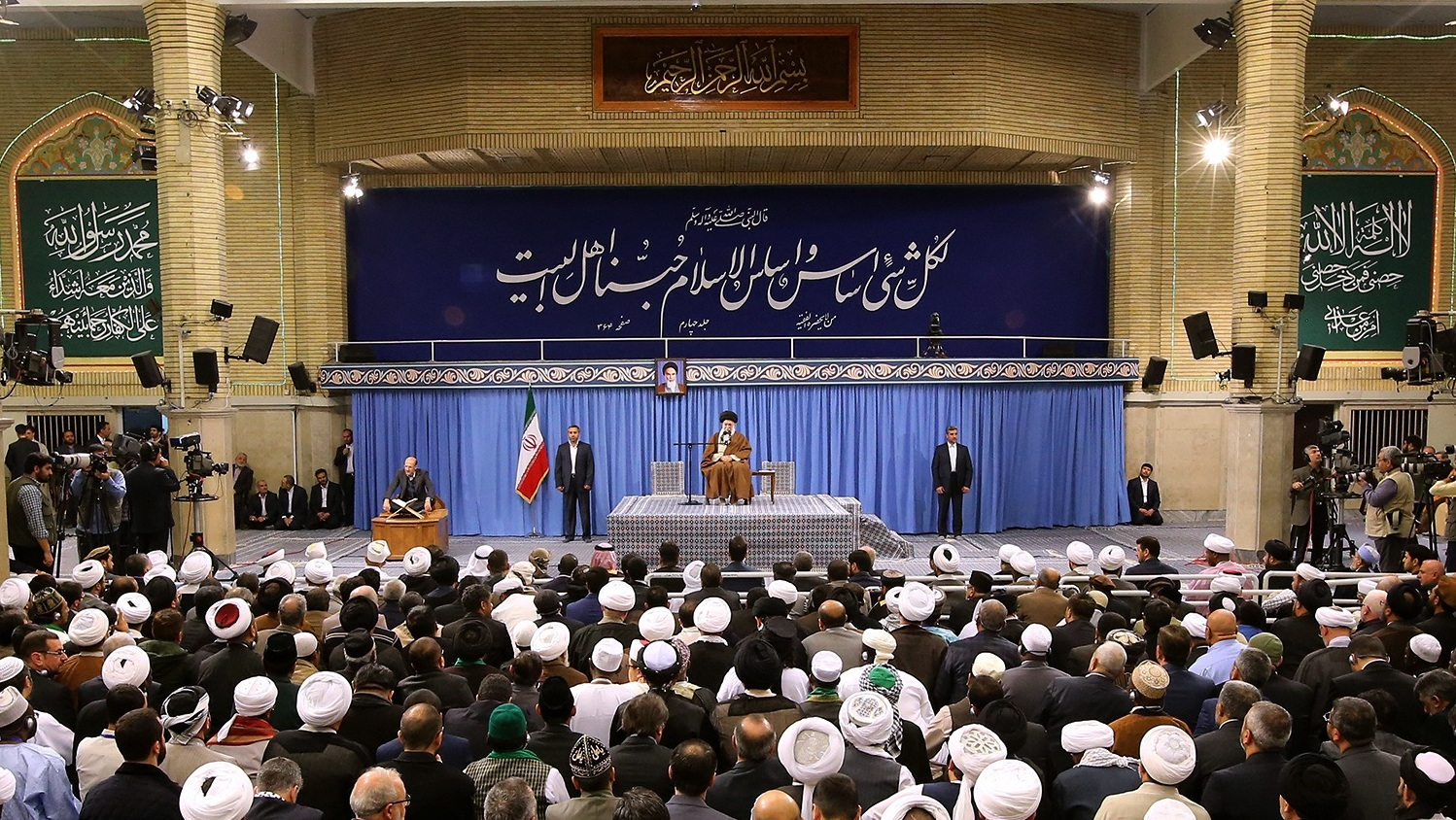
- Pictured here, the Imam Khomeini Hussainiya, part of the House of Leadership, was the place where the supreme leader usually met the public.

Agency overview
- Formed: July 1989
- Preceding agency: Jamaran Hussainiya
- Dissolved: 28 February 2026
- Status: Destroyed
- Headquarters: Tehran, Iran; 35°41′31″N 51°23′55″E
- Agency executives: Mojtaba Khamenei, Wakil; Mohammad Mohammadi Golpayegani, Chief of Staff; Vahid Haghanian, Chief Personal Aide and Deputy Chief of Staff; Ali Asghar Hejazi, Chief of Security Office; Chief of Military Office
- Website: www.leader.ir

The Office of the Supreme Leadership Authority (Persian: دفتر مقام معظم رهبری, Daftar-e Magham-e Moazzam-e Rahbari), also known in shortform as the House of the Leadership (Persian: بیت رهبری, Beit-e Rahbari), was the official residence, bureaucratic office and principal workplace of Ali Khamenei as supreme leader of Iran. It was destroyed in a series of airstrikes at the beginning of the 2026 Iran war, during which Khamenei was assassinated.

Its structure was a mixture of traditional Beit (religious office of Marja') and bureaucracy. The institution was located in central Tehran and was run by Mohammad Mohammadi Golpayegani. In 2026, it was estimated that 4,000 people were working at its headquarters and another 40,000 affiliated with the office throughout the Iranian government.

== Location ==
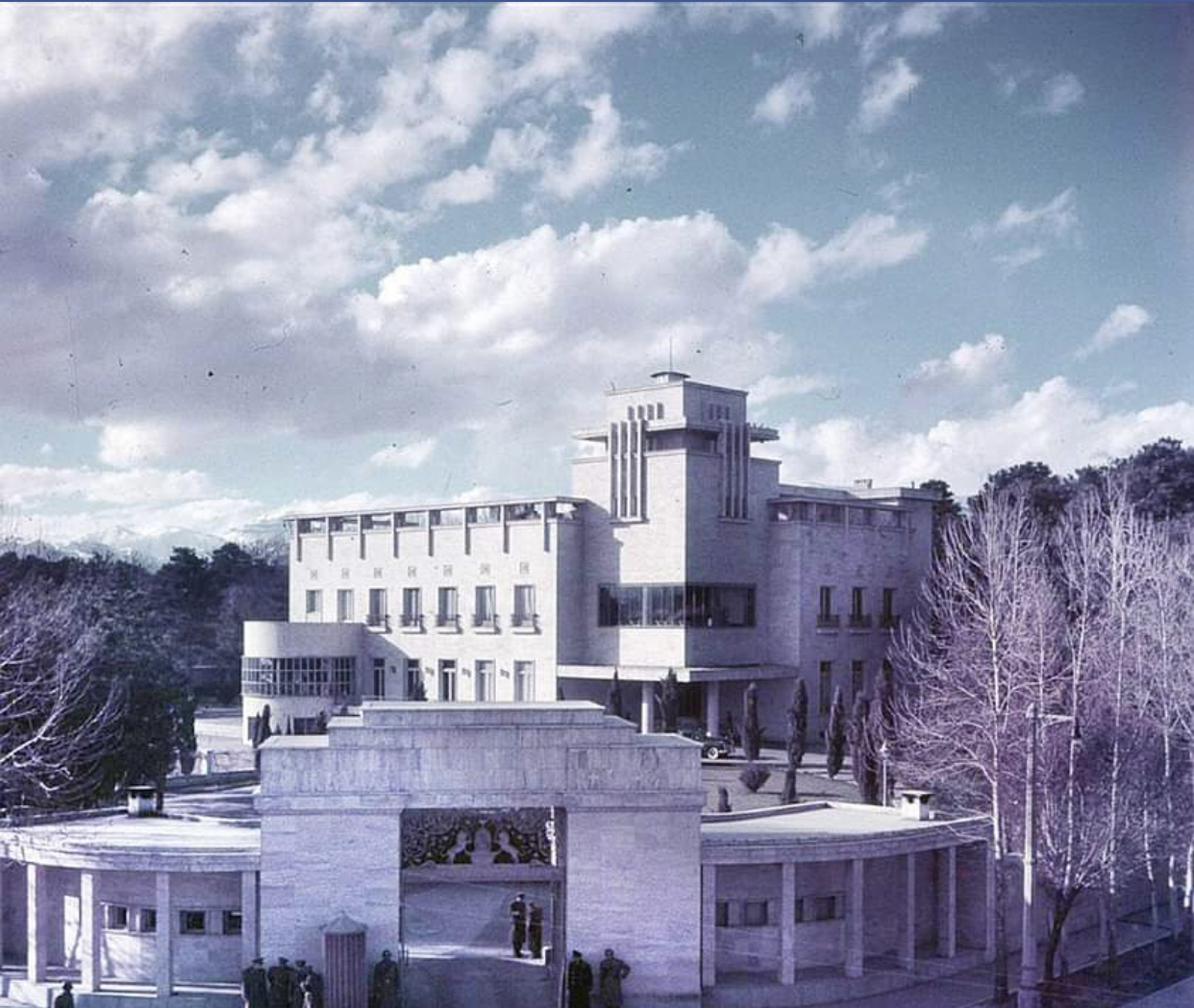
The location formerly housed the imperial Ekhtesassi Palace.

The Office of the Supreme Leader was built on the grounds of the former Ekhtesassi Palace, which served as Ali Khamenei's residence and office during his tenure as President of the Islamic Republic from 1981 to 1989. The palace was designed in 1938 by two Hungarian Jewish architects from Mandatory Palestine, Laszlo Fischer and Ferenc Bodanzky, who also designed the Ministry of Foreign Affairs building in the National Garden. Reza Shah personally selected the two to design the residence adjacent to his Marble Palace as a gift to the then-Crown Prince. Additional palaces were constructed in its vicinity for his siblings Shams (north, directly above), Ashraf (south, across the street) and Abdol Reza (east, across the street). It served as Mohammad Reza Shah's primary residence from 1938 until 1969, when the Imperial Court moved to the Niavaran Complex in northern Tehran.

== Overview ==
The Office of the Supreme Leader was used by the supreme leader to communicate and administer orders to various other military, cultural, economic, and political organizations. A number of political, military, and religious advisors worked under this office. These advisors have an influential role in decisions made throughout country.

According to Ali Motahari, a former member of parliament from Tehran, the influence of the Office of the Supreme Leader in the country's affairs was so great that "the parliament is effectively a branch of the Office of the Supreme Leader".

=== History ===
Traditionally in Shia Islam, an ayatollah has an office (bayt), often run by his son, to communicate and advise his followers on religious issues and to organize matters such as the collecting and distributing of charity. Ruhollah Khomeini's bayt had several dozen employees, operating largely traditionally. Under Ali Khamenei, the office grew to have thousands of employees, with offices devoted to making sure government ministries followed the leader's wishes, was known for being "secretive", and for consolidating power through security services — a way some thought of substituting for what Khamenei lacked in religious credentials. Khamenei had not achieved the rank of ayatollah at the time of his installation as supreme leader, and neither his son Mojtaba Khamenei, who became the third supreme leader after his father was assassinated.

== Sanctions ==
On 24 June 2019, U.S. president Donald Trump signed Executive Order 13876, in which the assets of the Office of the Supreme Leader of Iran, along with Ali Khamenei, were frozen following the incident near the Gulf of Oman in the days prior.

== See also ==
- Jamaran Hussainiya – Ruhollah Khomeini's residency in Jamaran – similar compound of the previous supreme leader
