= Asghar Hijazi =

Iranian cleric and politician

Seyyed Asghar Hijazi
- اصغر حجازی
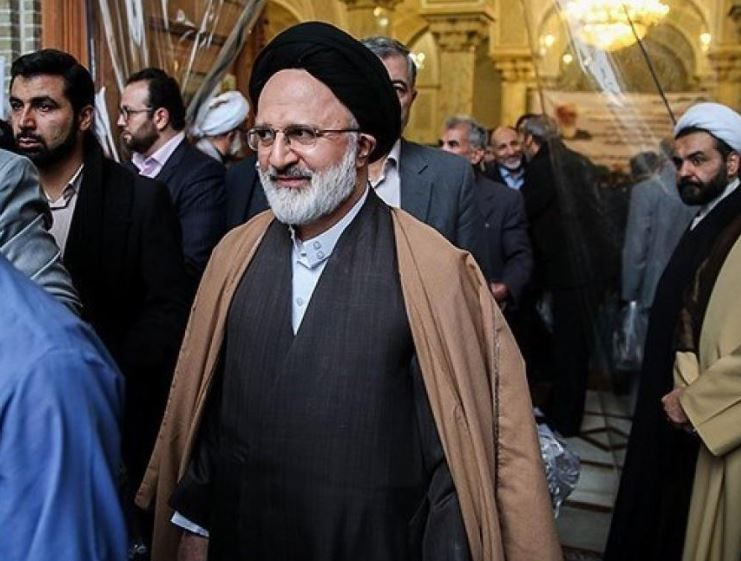
- Hijazi in 2017

Deputy Chief of Staff of the Supreme Leader of Iran

Political-Security Deputy of the Office of the Supreme Leader of Iran
- Appointed by: Ali Khamenei
- Preceded by: Position established

Personal details
- Born: Ali Asghar Mir Hijazi; September 8, 1946 (age 80) Hamadan or Isfahan, Iran
- Occupation: Cleric; politician

Ali Asghar Mir Hijazi (Persian: علی‌ اصغر میر حجازی) is an Iranian politician and cleric. He served as the deputy chief of staff to Ali Khamenei, the Supreme Leader of Iran, until 2026. He previously held the position of Deputy for Foreign Affairs in the Ministry of Intelligence of the Islamic Republic of Iran.

Hijazi played a key role in coordinating high-level affairs among Iran's branches of government, intelligence agencies (including the Ministry of Intelligence and parallel security institutions), and the implementation of state policies on behalf of the Supreme Leader. He is considered one of the most influential figures in the Office of the Supreme Leader of Iran.

Hijazi was placed under international sanctions by the European Union in March 2012 and by the United States Department of the Treasury in January 2020 for his alleged involvement in serious human rights violations in Iran.

== Early life and career ==
Asghar Hijazi was born on September 8, 1946, in either Hamadan or Isfahan. He is the son of Seyyed Javad Hijazi. In the early years of the Islamic Revolution, he was affiliated with the Islamic Republican Party. He joined the Islamic Republican Party during the 1979 Islamic Revolution. He gained political power and influence primarily through his affiliation with the Haghani Seminary of Qom, and was assisted by his uncle, Seyyed Sadegh Hejazi. Hejazi was the head of the Committee for the Purging and Sanitation of Government Offices, before being appointed by Ali Qoddusi as the political deputy of the Revolutionary Prosecutor's Office.

After the founding of the Ministry of Intelligence under then-President Khamenei, Hijazi was appointed Deputy for Foreign Affairs. Upon Khamenei's accession as Supreme Leader, Hijazi was named Deputy Chief of Staff in the Supreme Leader's office. He was regarded as a key behind-the-scenes intelligence figure within the Supreme Leader's inner circle, alongside Mohammad Mohammadi Golpayegani.

=== Role in press law intervention (2000) ===
On 6 August 2000, Ali Khamenei issued a letter to the Islamic Consultative Assembly demanding the withdrawal of a proposed reform to the Press Law. This was considered the first formal Hukm-i Hokumati ("ruling decree"). Hijazi was the person who officially delivered the letter to Mehdi Karroubi, then Speaker of Parliament.

=== Dispute with Mahmoud Ahmadinejad ===
According to some sources, Hijazi opposed the Supreme Leader's support for Mahmoud Ahmadinejad, even during Ahmadinejad's first term. As a result, Hijazi reportedly did not act as a liaison between the Leader and Ahmadinejad's government.

=== International sanctions ===
In April 2012, the European Union sanctioned 17 Iranian officials, including Hijazi, for their role in the suppression of citizens’ rights. He was banned from entering the EU and had his assets frozen.

On 30 May 2013, the United States Department of the Treasury sanctioned Hjjazi for serious human rights violations in the aftermath of the disputed 2009 Iranian presidential election. These sanctions included asset freezes and a travel ban.

=== Allegations of human rights violations and nepotism ===
According to multiple human rights organizations, Hijazi has been accused of overseeing repressive measures and suppressing protests under the direct order of the Supreme Leader.

In addition, Iranian media reported in November 2017 that Hijazi’s son, Seyyed Mohammad Hossein Hijazi, had been appointed to various public positions starting from the age of 19, including CEO of the Abbasabad Renovation Company. Critics accused Hijazi of using his influence to secure these roles. Others defended him, claiming the appointments were independent decisions made by municipal authorities.

=== Attempted assassination ===
Hijazi was reportedly targeted on 6 March 2026 in an Israeli attack during the 2026 Iran war, and claimed to have been assassinated. However, the United States later put a bounty of $10 million each on Hijazi and other Iranian officials, including Supreme Leader Mojtaba Khamenei, on 13 March. He has since been sighted at an official event in Mashhad on July 9, attending the burial ceremony of Ali Khamenei.

== See also ==
- Mohammad Mohammadi Golpayegani
- Office of the Supreme Leader of Iran
