= Jamaran Hussainiya =

Hussainiya in Tehran, Iranian national heritage site

Coordinates: 35.8180°N 51.4570°E

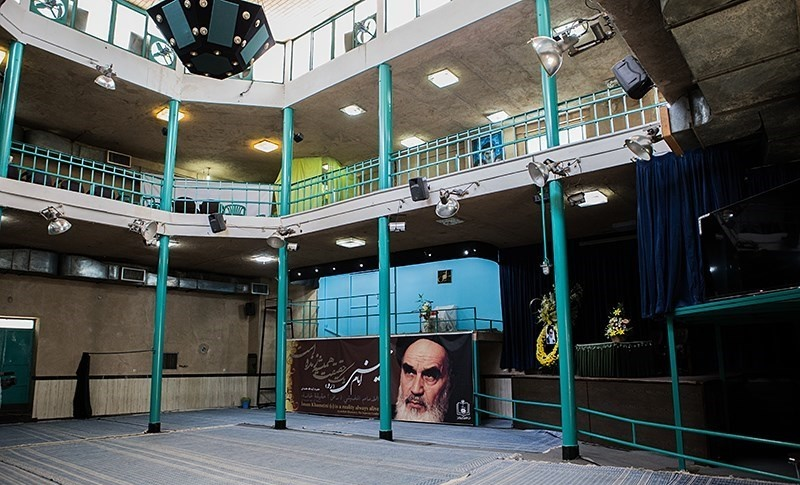
Jamaran Hussainiya, where Ayatollah Khomeini spoke during his leadership

Jamaran Hussainiya (Persian: حسینیه جماران) was the mansion of Ruhollah Khomeini, founder of the Islamic Republic of Iran, in Jamaran village. In January 1980, Khomeini traveled to Tehran to treat a heart ailment. The doctors told him the weather in Qom was not good for him. The mansion is situated next to the Hussainiya mosque in Jamaran village, the mansion being linked to the mosque by a metal platform. Khomeini often walked up a flight of stairs leading from his house to the balcony of the mosque, from which he often spoke.

== History ==
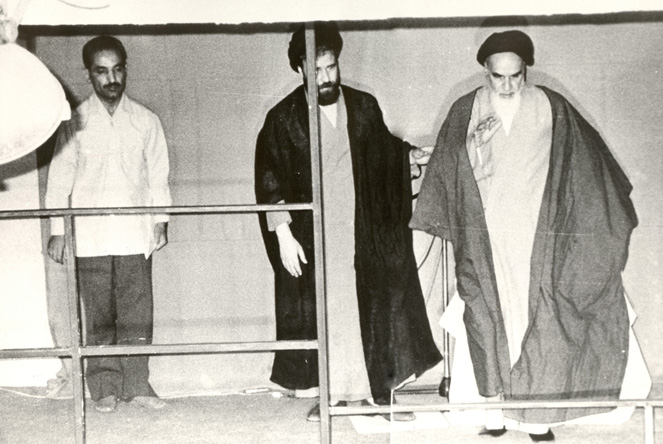
Ruhollah Khomeini along with Ahmad Khomeini and Mohammad-Ali Rajai in Jamaran Hussainiya, August 1981

On 23 January 1980, Ruhollah Khomeini went to Tehran from Qom to cure a heart ailment. He was hospitalized for thirty nine days, then he resided in the north Tehran suburb of Darband. It was not a suitable house for him. On 22 April, he took up residence in Jamaran on the suggestion of Seyyed Mahdi Imam Jamarani who was known as Imam Jamarani for leading prayers at the Jamarani mosque and spent the rest of his life there. The house was the birthplace of Imam Jamarani's mother, located near the mosque of Jamaran in Shaheed Husseinkiya street off Yasser Road. Khomeini delivered speeches and met foreign delegations at Jamaran Hussainiya.

The Jamaran village is on the foothills of the Alborz mountains and north of Tehran. This village is near Niavaran Palace where Mohammad Reza Pahlavi lived.

== Ruhollah Khomeini's room ==
Khomeini's house was placed next to the Hussainiya in Jamaran village. His room, located in front of house, was about 12 square meters. A small platform adjoined the room to the Hussainiya where he gave his speeches to audiences. Also, he met with Eduard Shevardnadze, first secretary of the Georgian Communist Party, and foreign minister of the Soviet Union at this room.

== In the news ==
To commemorate the death anniversary of Khomeini, Minister of Culture and Islamic Guidance, Ali Jannati and a number of his colleagues and artists visited the Jamaran Hussainiya.

== Gallery ==
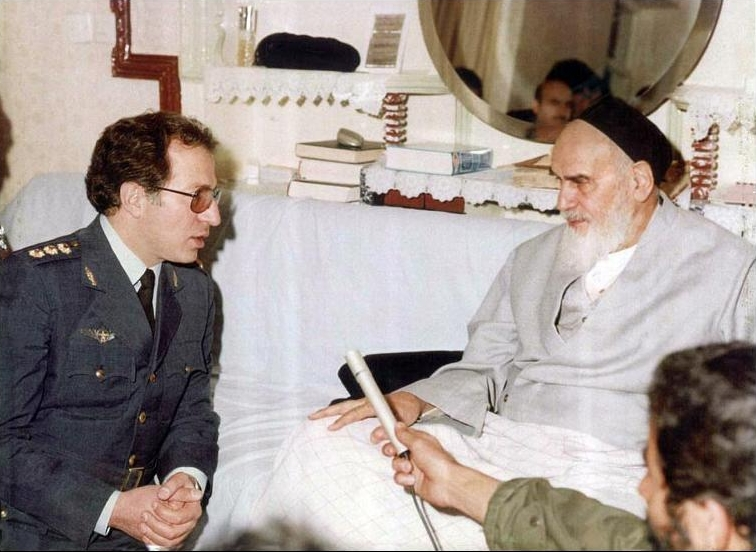
Major Javad Fakori meets Khomeini in Jamaran

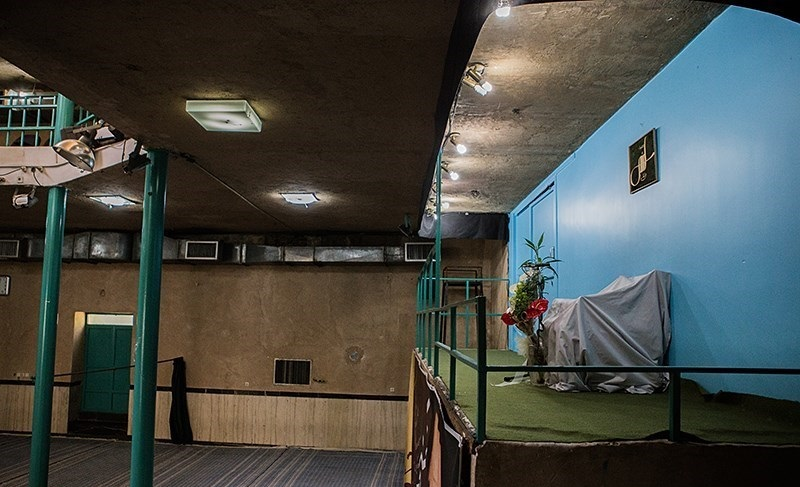
Jamaran Hussainiya in 2015

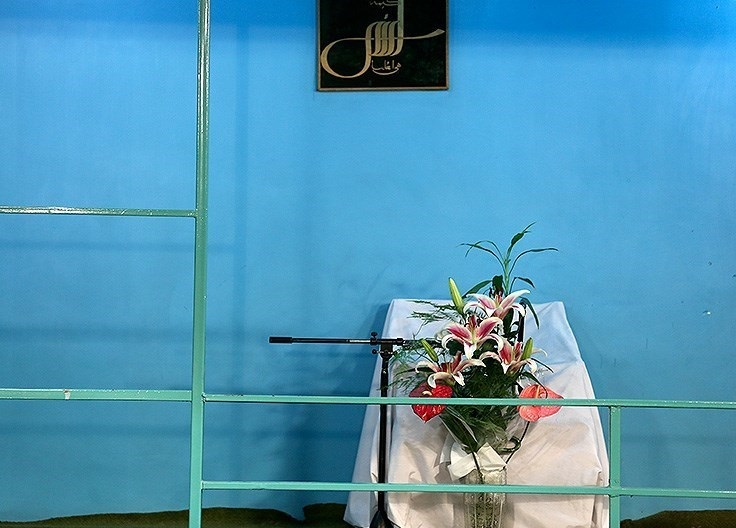
Khomeini's place

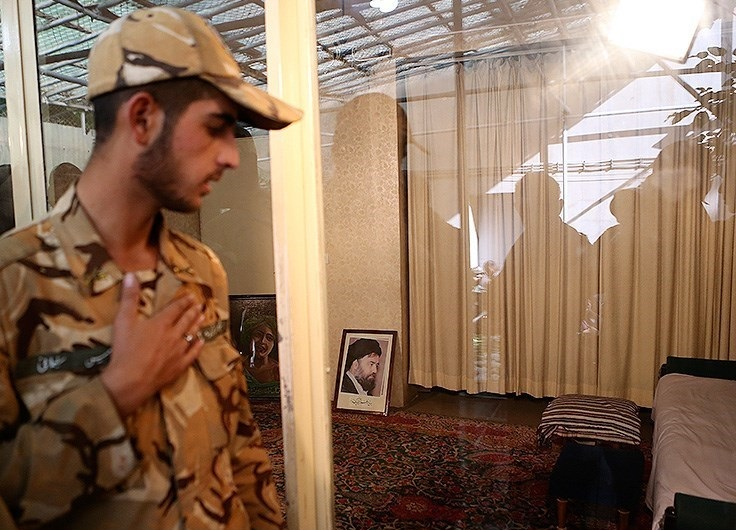
Khomeini's room

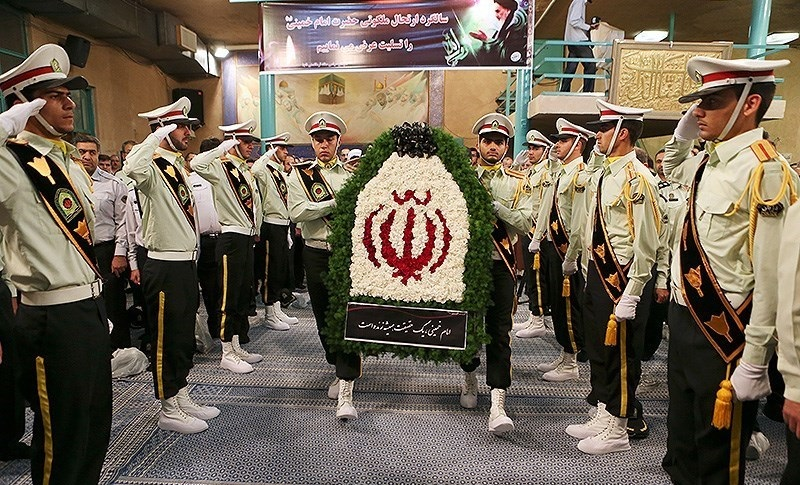
Hussainiya during anniversary of Khomeini's death

== See also ==
- Mausoleum of Ruhollah Khomeini
- Office of the Supreme Leader of Iran
- Imam Khomeini Mosalla, Tehran
