= Jamaran =

Neighbourhood in Tehran, Iran

Coordinates: 35°49′N 51°27′E

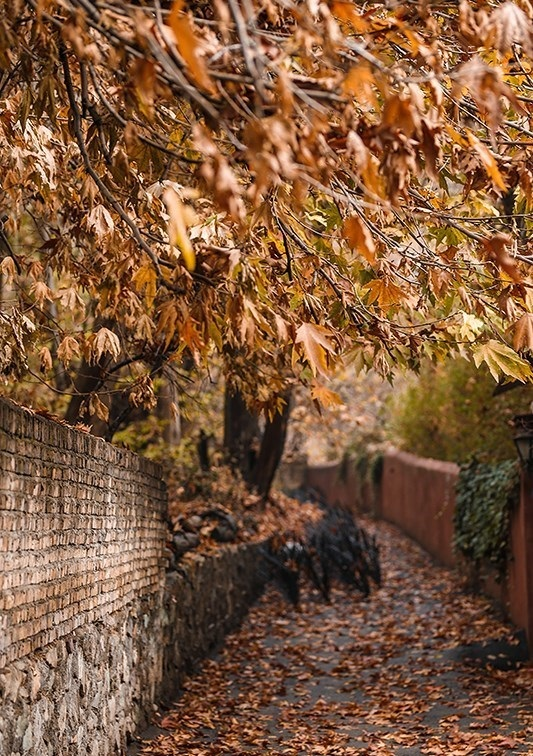
An alleyway in Jamaran.

Jamaran (Persian: جماران) is a neighbourhood located north of the city of Tehran in Iran.

Jamaran was once an independent village; it is now a part of the North Tehran region. It is best known for being the home of Ruhollah Khomeini. Khomeini's family and the Khomeini Foundation, with the approval of Iran's Supreme Leader, provided offices to Mohammed Khatami and the International Institute for Dialogue Among Cultures and Civilizations in one of Khomeini's Jamaran compounds.

Akbar Hashemi Rafsanjani also moved into the neighbourhood.
